= Hoàng Sa, Da Nang =

Coordinates: 16°32′05″N 111°36′30″E

Hoàng Sa Đặc khu Hoàng Sa
- Special Zone
- Hoàng Sa Special Zone
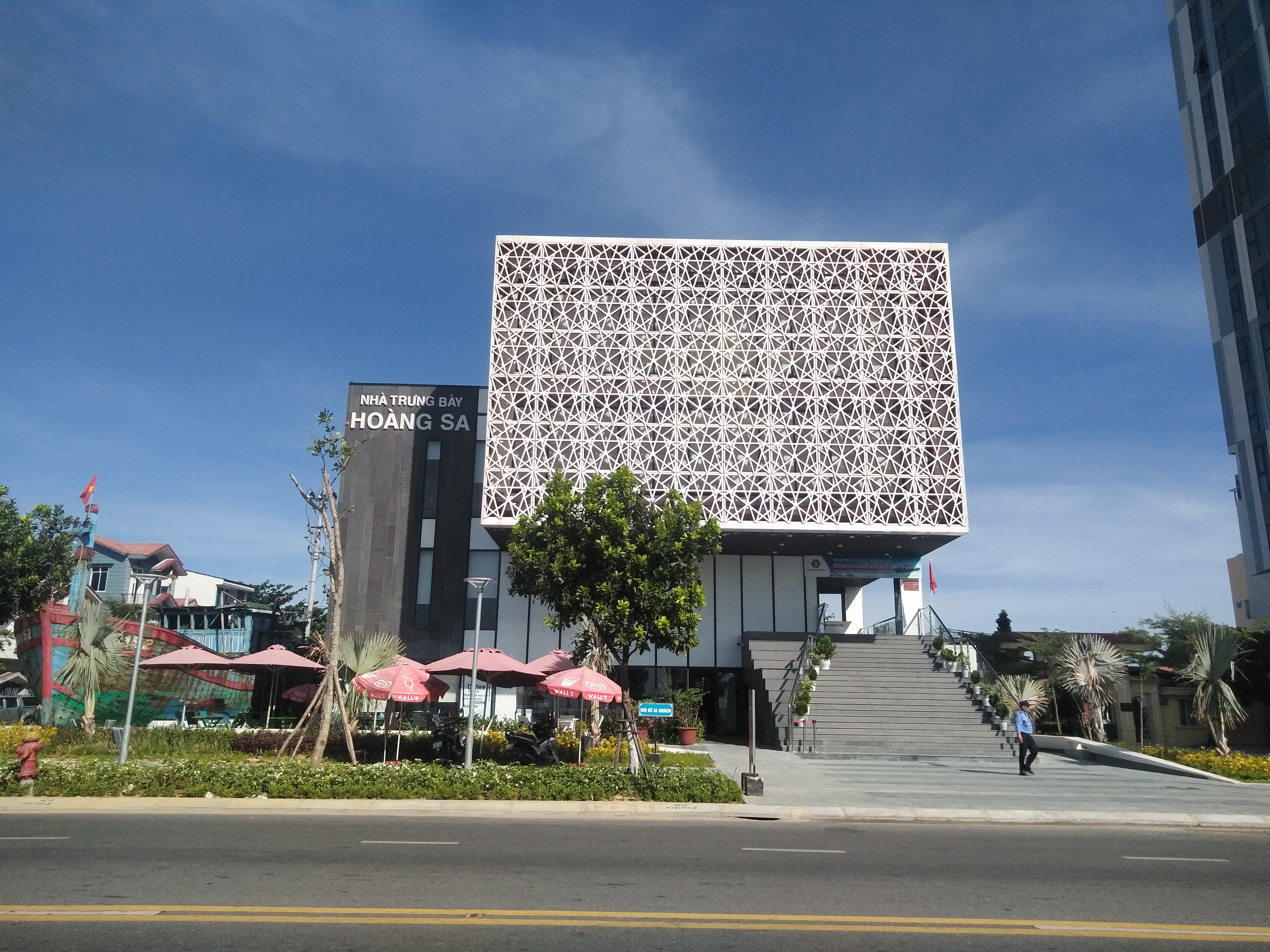
- Outside the Hoàng Sa Exhibition House.
- Interactive map of Hoàng Sa
- Country: Vietnam
- Region: North-Central and Central Coastal
- Municipality: Đà Nẵng
- Central hall: 132 Yên Bái St., Hải Châu Ward, Đà Nẵng City

Government
  - Type: Commune-level authority
  - People's Committee Chairman: Võ Công Chánh

Area
  - Total: 118 sq mi (305 km^{2})
- Time zone: UTC+7 (Indochina Time)
- ZIP code: 50000–509000 (Note: An official code from 31 December 2021, to present.)
- Website: hoangsa.danang.gov.vn

Hoàng Sa is Vietnam's designation and nominal special administrative zone. It is placed under the jurisdiction of Đà Nẵng city, in the North-Central and Central Coastal region of the country.

== History ==
The Hoàng Sa administrative unit covers an area of 305 km^{2} (118 sq mi) of the Paracel Islands, including the islands as follows: Pattle Island, North Reef, Robert Island, Discovery Reef, Passu Keah, Triton Island, Tree Island, North Island, Middle Island, South Island, Woody Island, Lincoln Island, Duncan Island, Bombay Reef, Observation Bank, West Sand, Vuladdore Reef and Pyramid Rock.

In 2009, Vietnam appointed an official, Đặng Công Ngữ, to be the first chairman of Hoàng Sa District. The incumbent is Võ Công Chánh, who was appointed on 5 May 2014. Vietnam does not control any of the islands it claims and the entire Paracel Islands archipelago is under the administration of the People's Republic of China after the Battle of the Paracel Islands in 1974 with the defeat of the Republic of Vietnam Military Forces.

In July 2012, China declared the Paracel Islands to be under the administration of Sansha prefecture in Hainan province.

Government of Vietnam established Hoàng Sa district in 1982 as part of Quảng Nam-Da Nang province. Since Quảng Nam and Da Nang were split in November 1996, the island district has belonged to Da Nang.

== See also ==
- Battle of the Paracel Islands
