= William Taylor Money =

Bombay Marine officer, merchant and politician

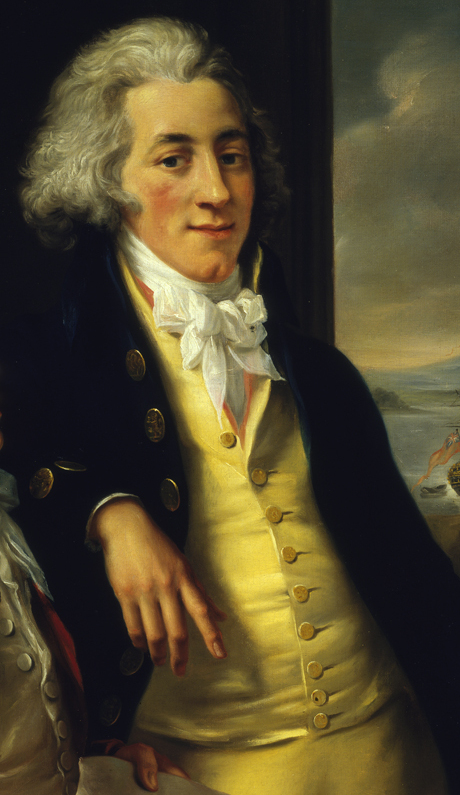
c. 1792 portrait of Money by John Francis Rigaud

Sir William Taylor Money, FRS (c. 4 September 1769 – April 1834) was a Bombay Marine officer, merchant and politician. Serving as a captain in the Bombay Marine, he commanded several merchantmen before being appointed superintendent of the Marine, where he oversaw the protection of East India Company (EIC) shipping routes in the Indian Ocean. Money later became a director of the EIC and a member of parliament, contributing to British commercial policies, naval strategy and scientific exploration. Money Island is named in his honor.

== Early life ==
He was the eldest son of Captain William Money of Wood End House, Walthamstow, a director of the East India Company for 1789–96, and Martha, the daughter of James Taylor.

== Career ==
Money was commissioned in the Bombay Marine as a lieutenant on Rose in 1786 and in 1793 he became captain of the General Goddard belonging to Sir Robert Wigram, 1st Baronet, his father's business partner. After a successful initial voyage he was given the command of other Wigram ships including the Walthamstow. On his retirement from sea in 1801 he became the Marine Superintendent at Bombay, a post he held until 1813.

During this period he served as president of the Asiatic Society of Bombay from 1815. He also gave his name to Money Island in the Paracel Islands group in the South China Sea which was named after him by the British naval surveyor Daniel Ross.

On his return to England he established a home in Streatham Park, Surrey and became a Director of the East India Company from 1818 to 1826. He entered Parliament as the member for Wootton Bassett from 1816 to 1820 and for Mitchell from 1820 to 1826. He gave up his Parliamentary seat in March 1826 when appointed consul to the Lombard states but died of cholera in Venice in April 1834.

He was elected a Fellow of the Royal Society in 1818. and invested a Knight of the Royal Guelphic Order in 1831.

== Private life ==
He had married Eugenia, the daughter of William Money of Homme House, Much Marcle, Herefordshire, with whom he had 7 sons and 2 daughters. He left all his property to his wife in trust for their children, but his estate in Java had to be sold to pay his debts. Several of his children and grandchildren also served in the Indian army or civil service.

Parliament of the United Kingdom
Preceded by Richard Ellison; Robert Rickards	Member of Parliament for Wootton Bassett; 1816–1820; With: Richard Ellison	Succeeded by Horace Twiss; Sir George Philips, Bt
Preceded by Sir George Staunton, Bt; William Leake	Member of Parliament for Mitchell; 1820–1826; With: Sir George Staunton, Bt	Succeeded by Sir George Staunton, Bt; Henry Labouchere
