= Coconut Princess =

Chinese cruise ship

Coconut Princess is a Chinese cruise ship operated by Hainan Strait Shipping Co. It connects Hainan island with the Paracel Islands. Service began in April 2013 and the trip took 20 hours, but was expected to be reduced to 6 hours by 2 September, with the home port changing from Haikou to Sanya. The cruise lasts four days. It has transported over 3,000 people in over 20 trips. It's the only maritime connection between the islands.
