= West Sand =

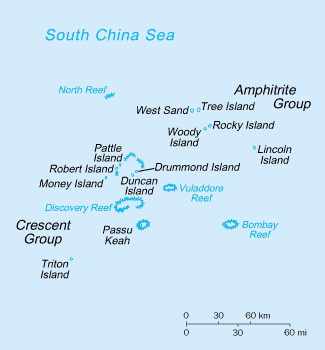

West Sand 16°58′39″N 112°12′43″E (Chinese: 西沙洲; pinyin: Xīshā-zhōu; Vietnamese: Cồn Cát Tây) is a sand cay located in the northwest of the Amphitrite Group of the Paracel Islands in the South China Sea. It is approximately 4 nautical miles (7.4 km) west of Tree Island.

West Sand is administered by the People's Republic of China. Being a part of the disputed Paracel Islands, the entity is also claimed by the Republic of China (Taiwan) and Vietnam.

In July 2014, the PRC announced an investment plan of 18 million yuan (about 2.92 million U.S. dollars) that "will be used to build desalination systems and grow trees on Xishazhou Island in the hope of turning the island into a new oasis". In April 2017, Xinhua published pictures of the current state of the forestation project, with trees going on most of the island.
