= Streptomyces xishensis =

Scientific classification
- Domain: Bacteria
- Kingdom: Bacillati
- Phylum: Actinomycetota
- Class: Actinomycetia
- Order: Streptomycetales
- Family: Streptomycetaceae
- Genus: Streptomyces
- Species: S. xishensis

Binomial name
- Streptomyces xishensis Xu et al. 2012

Type strain
- CCTCC AA 2010006, DSM 42022, YIM M 10378, YIMM10378

Species of bacterium

Streptomyces xishensis is a bacterium species from the genus of Streptomyces which has been isolated from marine sediments from the South China Sea near the Xisha Islands in China.

== See also ==
- List of Streptomyces species
