= Streptomyces abyssalis =

Scientific classification
- Domain: Bacteria
- Kingdom: Bacillati
- Phylum: Actinomycetota
- Class: Actinomycetia
- Order: Streptomycetales
- Family: Streptomycetaceae
- Genus: Streptomyces
- Species: S. abyssalis

Binomial name
- Streptomyces abyssalis Xu et al. 2012

Type strain
- CCTCC AA 2010008, DSM 42024, YIM M 10400, YIMM10400

Species of bacterium

Streptomyces abyssalis is a bacterium species from the genus Streptomyces which has been isolated from deep sea sediments in the South China Sea on the Xisha Islands in China.

== See also ==
- List of Streptomyces species
