= Antelope Reef =

Contested reef in the South China Sea

Coordinates: 16°27′N 111°35′E

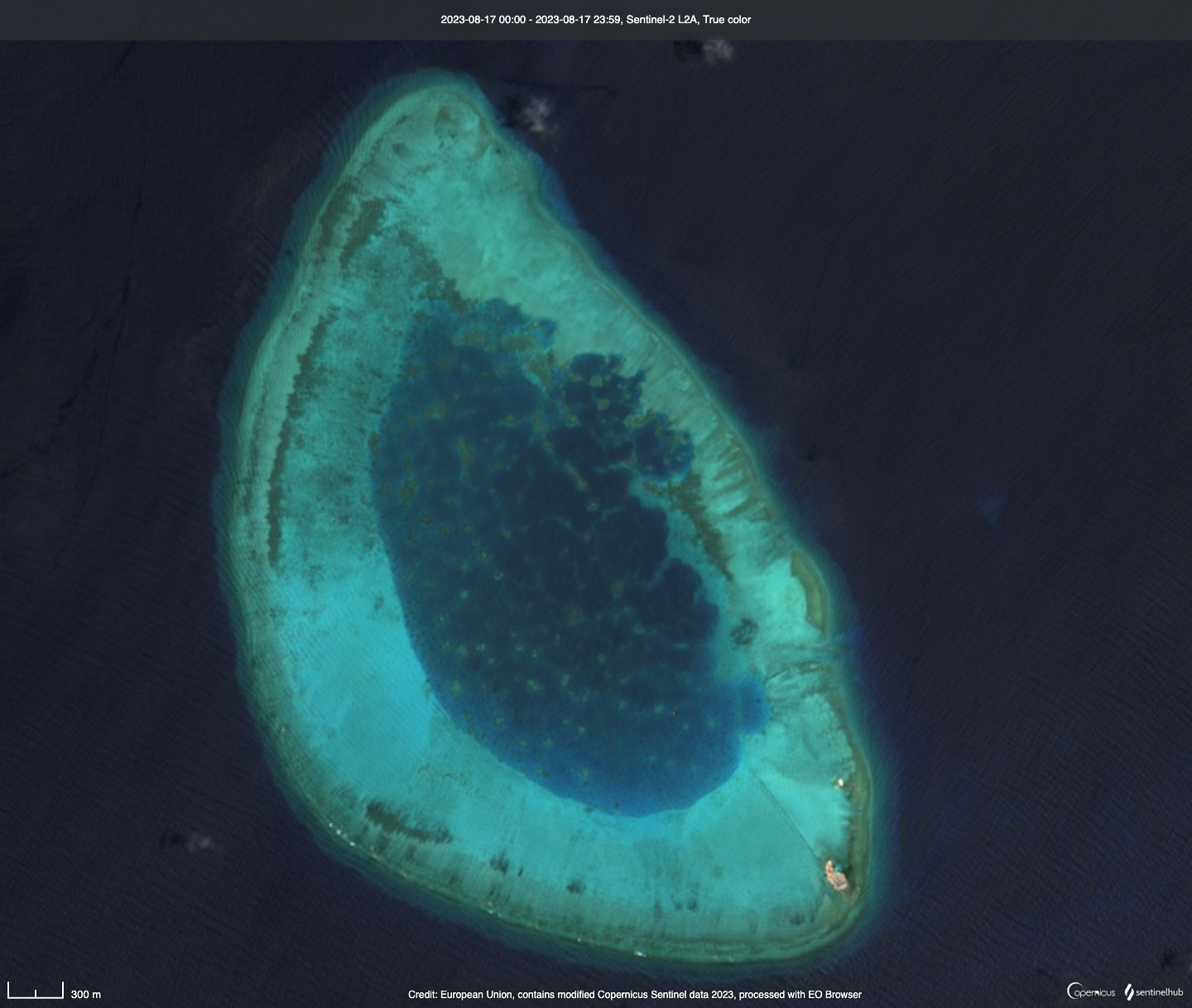
Satellite image of Antelope Reef

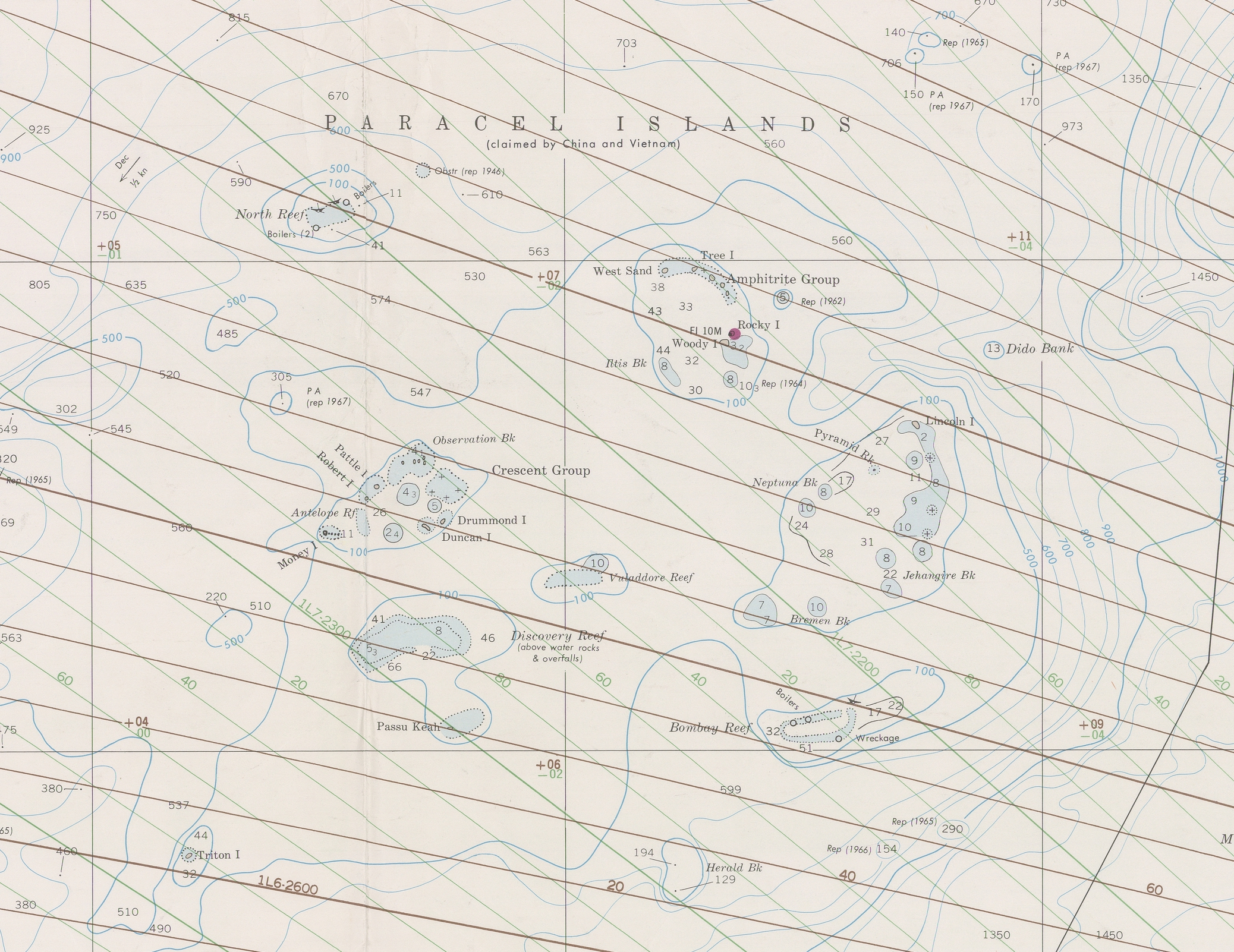
The Paracel Islands; Antelope Reef is to the left center.

Antelope Reef (Chinese name: Lingyang Jiao (羚羊礁); Vietnamese name: Đá Hải Sâm) is a small reef in the South China Sea contested by China, Vietnam, and Taiwan. It is part of the Crescent archipelago in the southwestern portion of the Paracel islands and is located approximately 162 nautical miles (300 km) from Sanya Port in China's Hainan province and 216 nautical miles (400 km) from Da Nang, Vietnam. It is named after the Antelope, a ship of the Bombay Marine (the navy of the East India Company), which surveyed the reef in 1808 under the command of Daniel Ross.

China had as of April 2026 reclaimed 1,490 acres (600 ha) and greatly expanded its military assets there, part of its claim on much of the South China Sea (vis. nine-dash line). The suddenness and scale of the illegal seizure and buildup, particularly after a pause of nearly a decade in such military engineering projects, surprised Western analysts.
