= Money Island, Paracel Islands =

Island in the South China Sea

Money Island
- Location within South China Sea
- Coordinates: 16.446225°N 111.507756°E

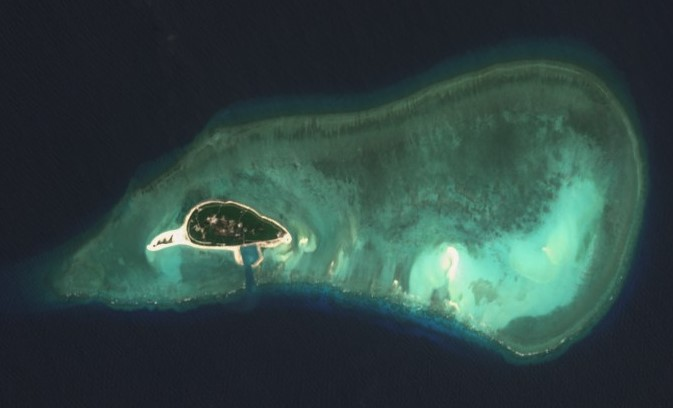
Money Island, viewed from Sentinel-2 in 2023

Money Island (Chinese: 金银岛; lit. 'money island'; Vietnamese: Đảo Quang Ảnh) is the southwesternmost island in the Crescent Group of the Paracel Islands archipelago. It rises to a height of 6 metres (20 ft) and is covered with brush. At the eastern side of the island lies an extensive reef, which contains a central lagoon, but the reef is mostly submerged at high tide. Inside the lagoon, the open areas range in depth from 7 to 20 metres (23 to 66 ft). The sand cay at the southeastern extremity of the reef is the reef's highest point. The channel between Money Island's reef and Antelope Reef is about 1.5 miles (2.4 km) wide. The reef continues around to the north side of the island. There is a small reef on the south side with a man-made channel cut through it to the beach.

Money Island was named after William Taylor Money, the superintendent of the Bombay Marine from 1803 to 1810. The name was conferred by the British naval officer and hydrographer Captain Daniel Ross, who surveyed the Paracel Islands. Ross's ship, Antelope, gave its name to the nearby Antelope Reef. The Chinese names (e.g. Jin Yin Dao for Money Island) are simple translations of the English names. The Vietnamese name Quang Ảnh dates from 1815 when the commander Phạm Quang Ảnh led the expedition to the islands in the reign of Emperor Gia Long.

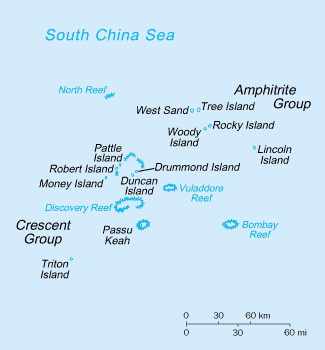
Money Island in Paracel Islands

Claims to the island, as part of the Paracels, have been made by the Republic of China (Taiwan) and Vietnam. While the island is uninhabited, patrols are conducted by the Navy of the People's Republic of China, who have built a fishermen's rest area there. It is believed that the south channel was cut by Chinese naval personnel.

== See also ==
- Paracel Islands
