= Bombay Reef =

Atoll in the South China Sea

Disputed atoll
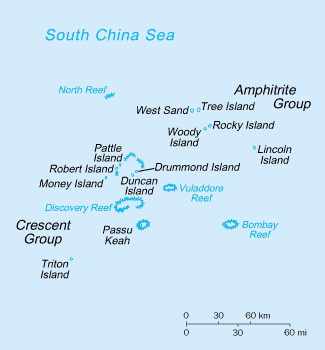
- Location of Bombay Reef within the Paracel Islands

- Location within South China Sea
- Other names: Chinese: 浪花礁; pinyin: Lànghuājiāo; Vietnamese: đá Bông Bay

Geography
- Location: South China Sea
- Coordinates: 16°02′41″N 112°31′06″E
- Archipelago: Paracel Islands
- Length: 10 mi (20 km)

Administration
- People's Republic of China

Claimed by
- Republic of China (Taiwan)
- Vietnam

Bombay Reef (Chinese: 浪花礁; pinyin: Lànghuājiāo, Vietnamese: đá Bông Bay) is an atoll of the Paracel Islands. In Chinese, the reef is alternatively known as "Pengbojiao" (Chinese: 蓬勃礁), or "Qilianyu(七连屿)" (literally "7 key lago") along with six other islands close by.

== Geography ==
The National Geospatial-Intelligence Agency's Sailing Directions describes Bombay Reef as "the southeasternmost known danger of the Paracel Islands, a steep-to reef 10 miles long E and W that surrounds a rock-strewn lagoon."

A lighthouse is located on the south-west end of the reef. It was built by the French in 1980.

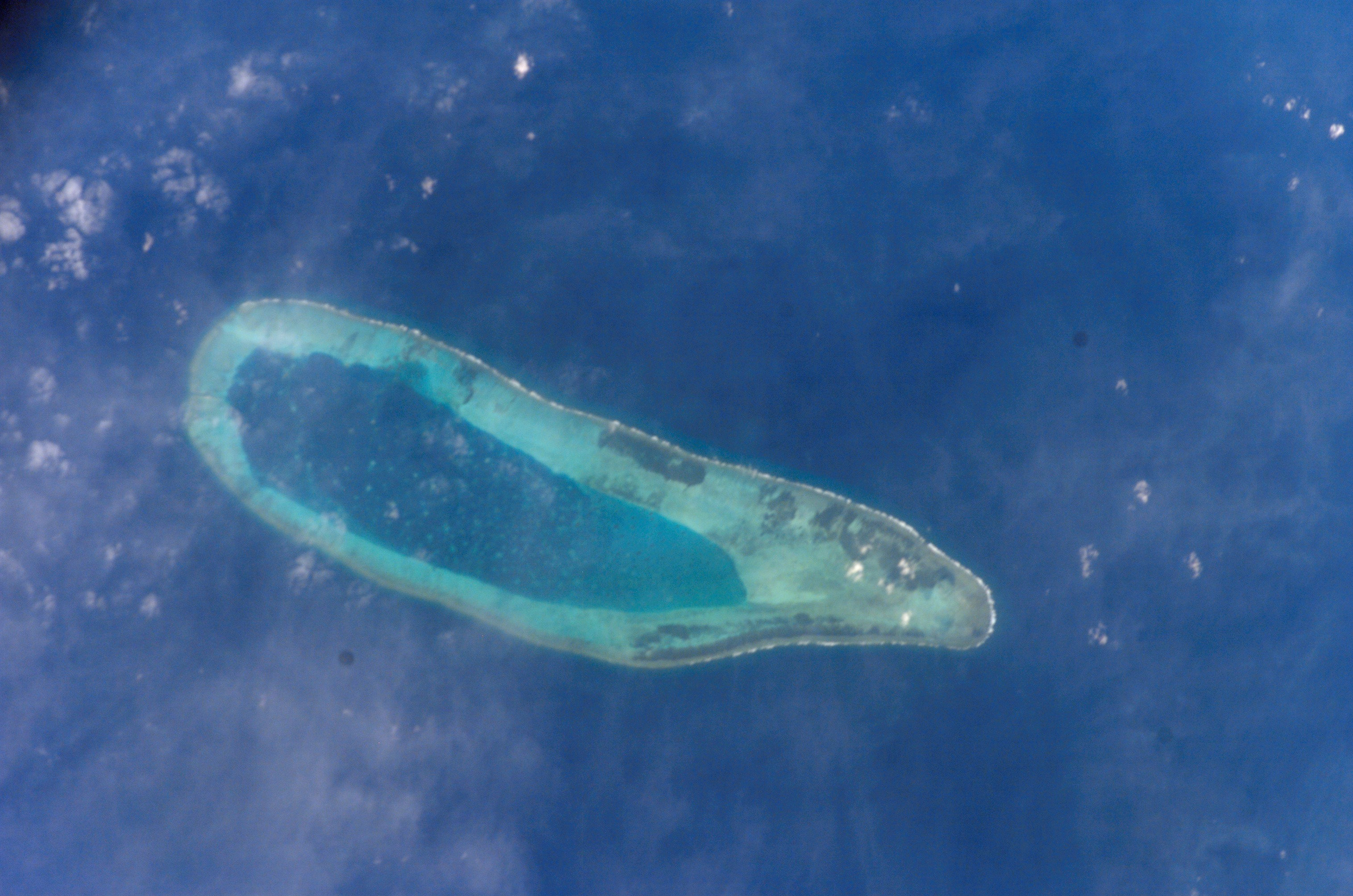
Bombay Reef (Paracel islands) as viewed from the International Space Station

== History ==
In the early hours of 20 December 1946, en route from Hong Kong to Singapore for decommissioning, HMS Aire ran aground on Bombay Reef. She was spotted by chance, three days later, by the passing HMS Bonaventure and the 85 crew, amongst them the ship's dog, were rescued with no serious casualties. As a River-class frigate, HMS Aire was sister ship to the famous superyacht Christina O.

In early May 1967 the 87-foot (27 m) steel sailing schooner Dante Deo, with six men and a six-year-old boy on board, was wrecked on Bombay Reef. The crew were rescued on 5 May 1967 by an amphibious aircraft operated by the 37th Air Rescue Squadron.

Bombay Reef is the site of numerous other shipwrecks, at least one of which is visible above water and on radar from 15 miles (24 km) away.

== Territorial claims ==
Lacking a native population, ownership of the Paracel Islands has been disputed since the early 20th century. In the aftermath of the First Indochina War until 1974 Vietnam occupied Pattle Island, approximately 60 nautical miles (110 km) away. Control has been enforced by the People's Republic of China since the Battle of the Paracel Islands.

Bombay Reef is administered and governed by the People's Republic of China and patrolled by the Chinese border police.

== See also ==
- Lincoln Island (东岛/đảo Linh Côn)
- Middle Island (中岛/đảo Trung)
- North Island (北礁/đảo Bắc)
- North Reef (北岛/đá Bắc)
- Rocky Island (石岛/đảo Đá)
- South Island (南岛/đảo Nam)
- Tree Island (赵述岛/đảo Cây)
- Triton Island (中建岛/đảo Tri Tôn)
- Woody Island
