= Tree Island, South China Sea =

Tree Island
- Village-level division
- Zhaoshu Community
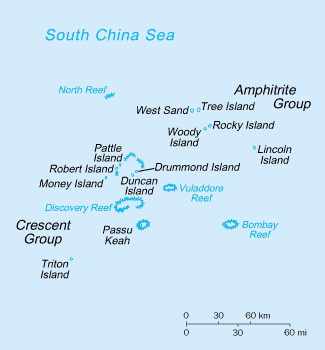
- Tree Island is located in the northeast of the Paracel Islands.

- Location within South China Sea
- Coordinates: 16°58′48″N 112°16′16″E
- Country: China
- Province: Hainan
- Prefecture-level city: Sansha
- County-level division: Xisha District
- Township-level division: Yongxing Dao Neighborhood Committee
- Time zone: UTC+8 (China)

For the "Tree Island" in Tuen Mun District, New Territories, Hong Kong, see Pak Chau.

Tree Island, also known as Zhaoshu Island, (Chinese: 赵述岛; Chinese: 趙述島; pinyin: Zhaoshu Dao; Vietnamese: Đảo Cây) is one of the main islands of the Paracel Islands group in the South China Sea. In 1947, the Chinese named the island Zhaoshu Dao to commemorate Zhao Shu (Chinese: 赵述) who accompanied Zheng He's expeditions in high seas (1405-1433). The area of the island is 22 hectares (54 acres) (0.22 km^{2}). It is under the administration of Hainan Province of China through the Zhaoshudao Village Committee. The island is also claimed by the Republic of China (Taiwan) and Vietnam.

== Other names ==
- The name Shu Dao (Chinese: 树岛; lit. 'tree island') is homologous to "Tree Island". It was coined [by the Republic of China] in 1935.
- The names An Dao (Chinese: 暗岛; lit. 'dark island'), Chuan'an Dao (Chinese: 船暗岛; lit. 'boat dark island'), and Chuanwan Dao (Chinese: 船晚岛; lit. 'boat evening island'), are traditionally used among the Hainanese fishermen as the island was discovered at night some centuries ago.

== Tourism ==
The island is open to tourists. Tourists may require political examination in Haikou of Hainan Province before taking a tour there, and can hire a fishing boat from Hainan. There is beach volleyball equipment and facilities located on the island; there are also the ruins of a Chinese temple dating back to the Ming dynasty.

== PRC's baselines declaration ==
The Declaration of the Government of the People's Republic of China on the baselines of the territorial sea (May 15, 1996): Three 3 points on Zhaoshu Dao (Tree Island) are the baseline points of the Chinese territorial sea:

- Zhaoshu Dao(1) 16° 59.9' N, 112° 14.7' E
- Zhaoshu Dao(2) 16° 59.7' N, 112° 15.6' E
- Zhaoshu Dao(3) 16° 59.4' N, 112° 16.6' E

== See also ==
- Paracel Islands
- North Island (北岛/đảo Bắc)
- Middle Island (中岛/đảo Trung)
- South Island (南岛/đảo Nam)
- Rocky Island (石岛/đảo Đá)
- Lincoln Island (东岛/đảo Linh Côn)
- Triton Island, (中建岛/đảo Tri Tôn)
- Bombay Reef (浪花礁/đá Bông Bay)
- North Reef (北礁/đá Bắc)
