= Rocky Island, South China Sea =

Rocky Island Shí Dǎo 石岛
- Town
- Shí Dǎo Island 石岛虚拟镇
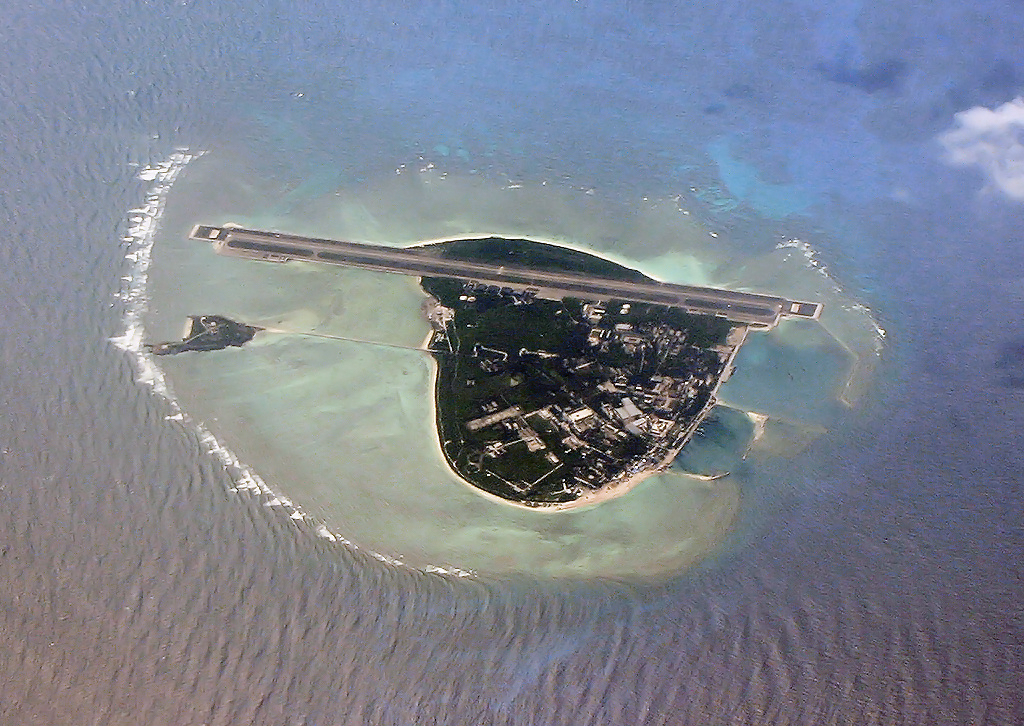
- Rocky Island (left) connected to Woody Island (right) in 2009.

- Location within South China Sea
- Coordinates: 16°50′40″N 112°20′50″E
- Country: China
- Province: Hainan
- City: Sansha

Government
  - Type: Town
  - Body: Yongxingdao Neighborhood Committee

Dimensions
  - Length: 0.4 km (0.25 mi)
  - Width: 0.22 km (0.14 mi)

Ethnicity
  - Chinese: 100%

Languages
  - Chinese: 100%
- Time zone: UTC+8 (China)
- Post code: 572000
- Dialing code: +86 0898

Rocky Island (simplified Chinese: 石岛; traditional Chinese: 石島; pinyin: Shí Dǎo; lit. 'stone island'; Vietnamese: Đảo Đá) is one of the Paracel Islands in the South China Sea. It is under the administration of the People's Republic of China and guarded by the PLA Navy. The island is also claimed by Taiwan and Vietnam.

== Geography ==
Until 2016–2017, Rocky Island was connected to Woody Island by an 800-metre (2,600 ft) concrete causeway. Land reclamation in 2016–2017 has joined the two islands by a larger area of land. The north part of causeway is now part of an infill construction project while the south end provides protection of the roadway from the sea.

== History ==
A signals intelligence station was built on Rocky Island in 1995, mainly because the island is the highest point in the Paracel Islands.

== See also ==
- Sansha
- South China Sea Islands
