= Daniel Ross (marine surveyor) =

British naval officer and hydrographer (1780–1849)

Captain Daniel Ross, FRS (11 November 1780 – 29 October 1849) was a British naval officer and hydrographer. Famous for his care and regard for scientific accuracy, he was known as "the Father of the Indian Surveys".

== Origins ==
Ross was the illegitimate son of Hercules Ross, a Scottish merchant in Jamaica, and Elizabeth Foord, a freed slave. The sportsman and pioneer photographer Horatio Ross was his half-brother.

== Career ==
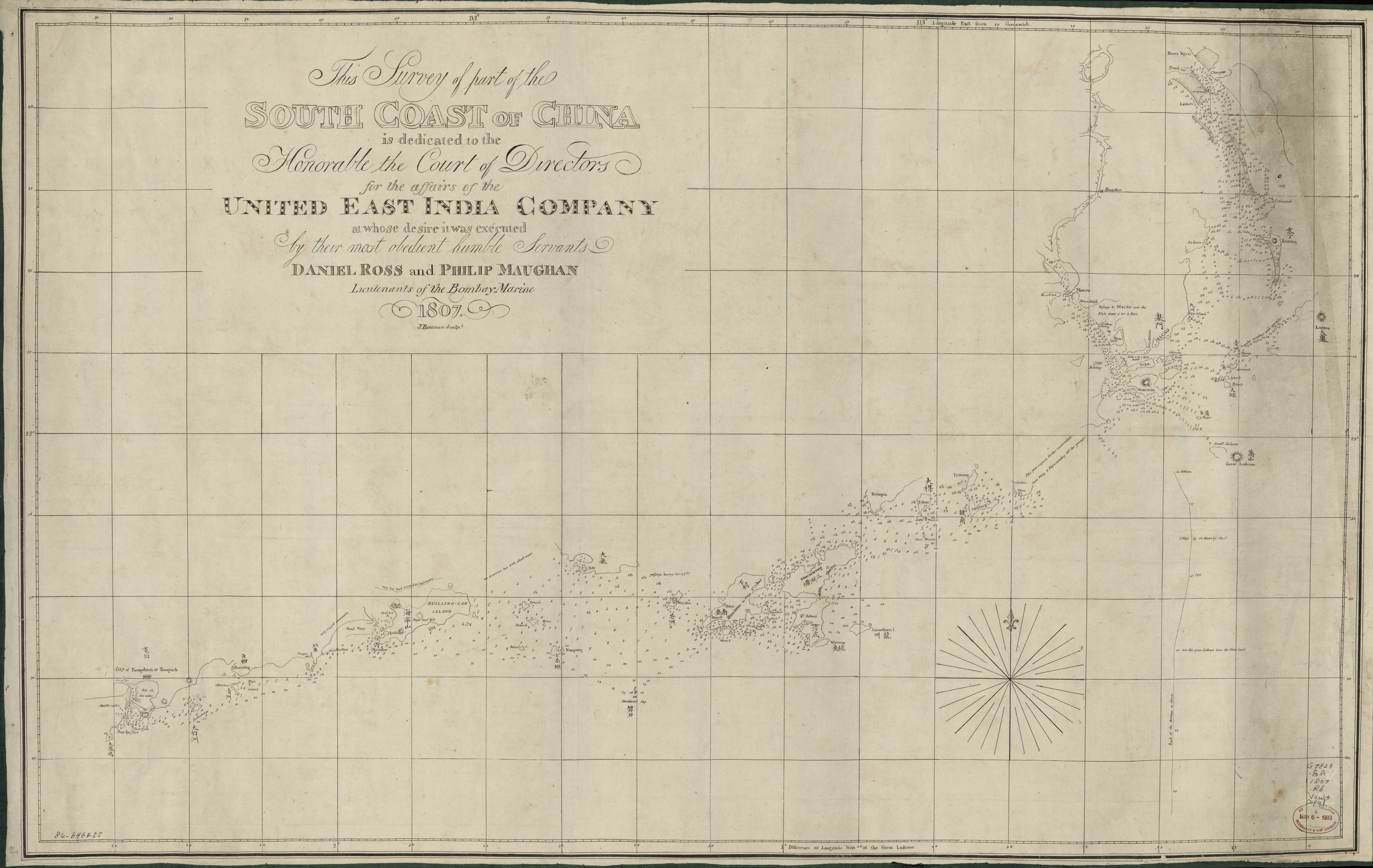
Survey of part of the south coast of China by Ross

Ross joined the Bombay Marine in 1795. Between 1806 and 1820 he was engaged in surveying the coast of China: he made surveys of part of the Bohai Sea and of Guangdong, as well as the South China Sea and the Paracel Islands. His election as a Fellow of the Royal Society in 1822 reflected the reputation which he had acquired during that period.

In 1823, Ross was appointed Marine Surveyor General at Calcutta and remained in that position until he resigned his appointment in November 1833. After his resignation he retired to Bombay, where he was Master Attendant, and was appointed President of the Geographical Society of Bombay in 1838. Following his retirement as president on grounds of ill-health in 1849, shortly before his death, the Bombay Geographical Society appointed him Honorary President. The minutes of the Society record that:

"Captain Ross had established for himself a European reputation of a high order, as one of the most practical and correct of Eastern Hydrographers; and the fortunes of many merchants, and the lives of many mariners, have been saved by the results of his patient and scientific labors."

== Family ==
In 1809 Ross married Maria Rosa Theresa Pepin. They had six children before she died in 1828.
