= Paracel Islands =

Disputed islands in the South China Sea

Disputed islands
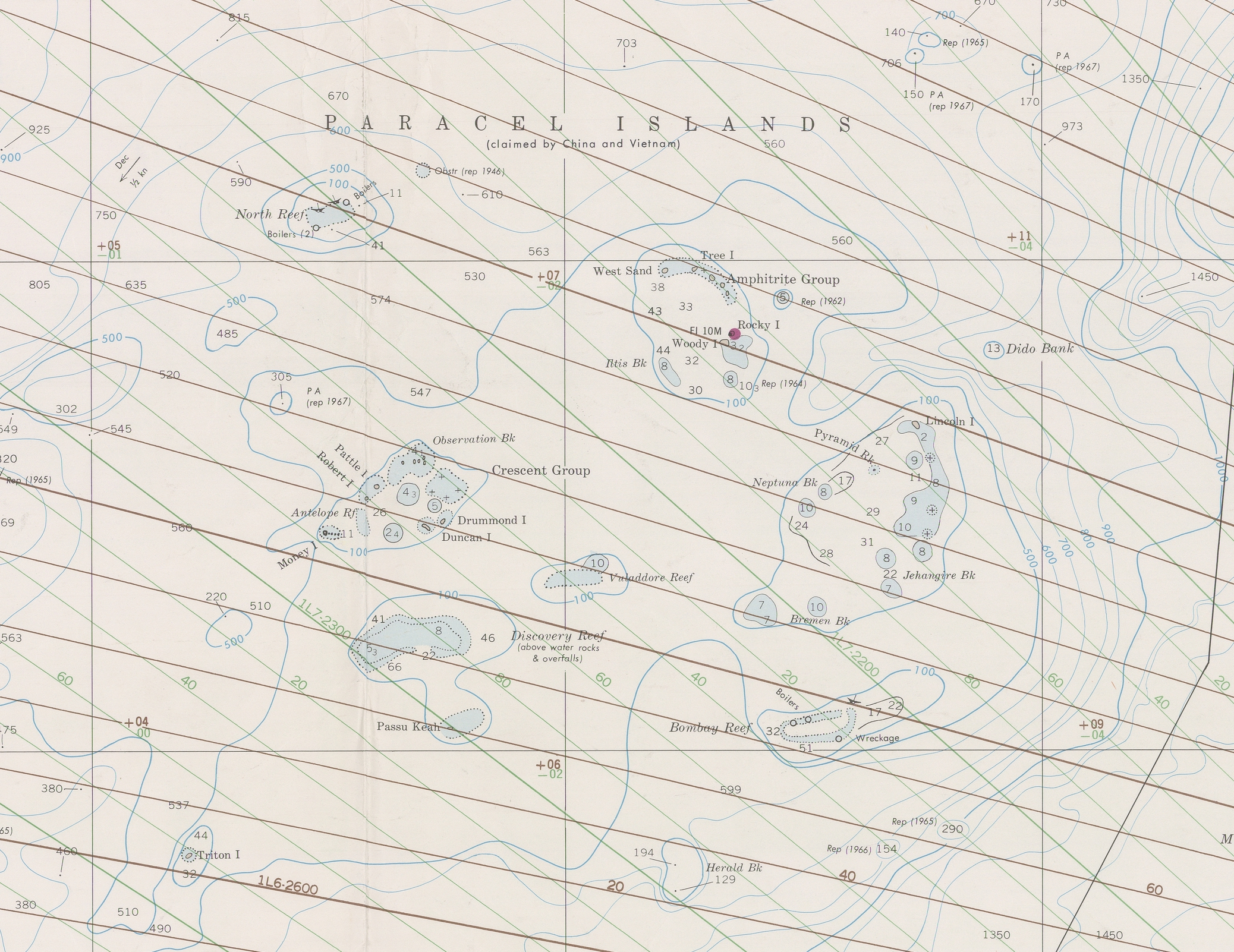
- Nautical chart of the Paracel Islands

- Location within South China Sea

Geography
- Location: South China Sea
- Coordinates: 16°40′N 112°20′E
- Total islands: Over 30
- Major islands: Woody, Rocky, Tree, Money, Robert, Pattle, Triton, Duncan, Lincoln, Drummond
- Area: 7.75 km^{2} (2.99 sq mi) (15,000 sq km ocean surface)
- Coastline: 518 km (321.9 mi)
- Highest elevation: 14 m (46 ft)
- Highest point: Rocky Island

Administration
- China (de facto since 1974 (Note: See the Battle of the Paracel Islands article.))
- Province: Hainan
- Prefecture-level city: Sansha
- District: Xisha District

Claimed by
- Taiwan
- Municipality: Kaohsiung
- Vietnam
- Municipality: Da Nang

Demographics
- Population: Over 1,000 (2014)

Additional information

Chinese name
- Simplified Chinese: 西沙群岛
- Traditional Chinese: 西沙群島
- Literal meaning: Western Sandy Archipelago
Transcriptions
Standard Mandarin
- Hanyu Pinyin: Xīshā Qúndǎo
- Wade–Giles: Hsi-sha Ch'ün-tao
Yue: Cantonese
- Jyutping: Sai^{1}-saa^{1} Kwan^{4}-dou^{2}
Southern Min
- Hainanese Romanization: Sa-so Kún-tō

Vietnamese name
- Vietnamese: Quần đảo Hoàng Sa
- Hán-Nôm: 群島黃沙

The Paracel Islands, also known as the Xisha Islands (simplified Chinese: 西沙群岛; traditional Chinese: 西沙群島; pinyin: xīshā qúndǎo; lit. 'West Sand Archipelago') and the Hoàng Sa Archipelago (Vietnamese: Quần đảo Hoàng Sa; Chữ Hán: 羣島黃沙, lit. 'Yellow Sand Archipelago'), are an archipelago in the South China Sea. It is under the control of the People's Republic of China, but its sovereignty in whole or in part is disputed by Taiwan and Vietnam.

The word paracel is of Portuguese origin, meaning placer (a submerged bank or reef), and appears on 16th-century Portuguese maps. The archipelago includes about 130 small coral islands and reefs, most grouped into the northeastern Amphitrite Group or the western Crescent Group. They are distributed over a maritime area of around 15,000 square kilometers (5,800 sq mi), with a land area of approximately 7.75 square kilometers (2.99 sq mi). The archipelago is located about 220 miles (350 km) southeast of Hainan Island, equidistant from the coastlines of the People's Republic of China (PRC) and Vietnam, and approximately one-third of the way between central Vietnam and the northern Philippines. A feature of the Paracel Islands is Dragon Hole, the second deepest blue hole (underwater sinkhole) in the world. Sea turtles and seabirds are native to the islands, which have a hot and humid climate, abundant rainfall and may experience annual typhoons. The archipelago is surrounded by productive fishing grounds and a seabed potentially containing unexplored oil and gas reserves.

== Geography ==
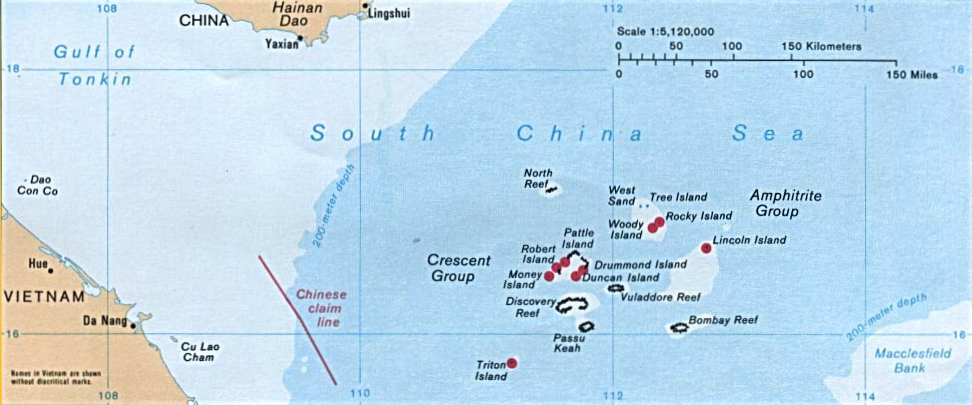
Location of the Paracel Islands showing the more significant PRC settlements

- Geographic coordinates: 16°40′N 112°20′E
- Coastline: 518 km (322 mi)
- Climate: tropical
- Elevation extremes:
  - Lowest point: South China Sea, sea level
  - Highest point: unnamed location on Rocky Island 14 m (46 ft)
- Natural resources: fish, coral reefs, possible reserves of oil and gas of unknown size
- Natural hazards: typhoons

=== Climate ===
The climate is different from nearby continental land masses with the lower air mass temperatures being 1 to 2 °C (1.8 to 3.6 °F) cooler than land at the same latitude, and with higher relative humidity due to the maritime air mass. The air mass over the Paracel Islands has about a 5 °C (9.0 °F) variation in annual temperature compared to the 2.2 °C (4.0 °F) observed over the Spratly Islands.

Climate data for Pattle Island
Month	Jan	Feb	Mar	Apr	May	Jun	Jul	Aug	Sep	Oct	Nov	Dec	Year
Record high °C (°F)	31.3 (88.3)	30.8 (87.4)	33.1 (91.6)	34.3 (93.7)	35.9 (96.6)	35.9 (96.6)	35.1 (95.2)	35.0 (95.0)	34.0 (93.2)	34.1 (93.4)	32.8 (91.0)	30.4 (86.7)	35.9 (96.6)
Mean daily maximum °C (°F)	25.7 (78.3)	26.7 (80.1)	28.5 (83.3)	30.6 (87.1)	32.1 (89.8)	31.8 (89.2)	31.5 (88.7)	31.0 (87.8)	30.4 (86.7)	29.2 (84.6)	27.7 (81.9)	26.8 (80.2)	29.3 (84.7)
Daily mean °C (°F)	23.2 (73.8)	23.9 (75.0)	25.5 (77.9)	27.5 (81.5)	29.1 (84.4)	29.2 (84.6)	28.9 (84.0)	28.7 (83.7)	28.0 (82.4)	27.0 (80.6)	25.7 (78.3)	24.9 (76.8)	26.8 (80.2)
Mean daily minimum °C (°F)	21.7 (71.1)	22.2 (72.0)	23.6 (74.5)	25.6 (78.1)	27.1 (80.8)	27.4 (81.3)	27.1 (80.8)	26.8 (80.2)	26.1 (79.0)	25.3 (77.5)	24.4 (75.9)	22.9 (73.2)	25.0 (77.0)
Record low °C (°F)	14.9 (58.8)	18.1 (64.6)	18.7 (65.7)	19.1 (66.4)	21.7 (71.1)	23.0 (73.4)	22.4 (72.3)	21.0 (69.8)	21.6 (70.9)	21.2 (70.2)	18.9 (66.0)	13.8 (56.8)	13.8 (56.8)
Average precipitation mm (inches)	13 (0.5)	12 (0.5)	23 (0.9)	44 (1.7)	74 (2.9)	117 (4.6)	225 (8.9)	162 (6.4)	216 (8.5)	241 (9.5)	152 (6.0)	30 (1.2)	1,308 (51.5)
Average precipitation days	7.5	5.5	4.8	2.4	6.7	7.1	7.8	9.0	11.4	13.3	14.0	7.9	97.2
Average relative humidity (%)	80.6	81.6	81.5	81.8	82.2	84.2	84.6	85.3	85.7	84.5	83.8	81.9	83.1
Mean monthly sunshine hours	207	226	248	276	298	245	238	245	193	223	191	199	2,788
Source: Vietnam Institute for Building Science and Technology

=== Amphitrite group ===
The Amphitrite group was named after the French frigate Amphitrite, which observed the islands while carrying a Jesuit mission to Canton in 1698–1700.

Lying in the northeast of the Paracel Islands at 16°53′N 112°17′E, the group consists of low, narrow islands with sand cays and enclosed shallow lagoons connected by reefs of rock. It is about 37 km (23 mi) northwest of Lincoln Island. The group approximately forms an ellipse with a north–south axis of 22 km (14 mi).

The northern section of the group comprises West Sand, Tree Island, and the Qilian Yu (七连屿, "seven sisters") sub-group: North Island, Middle Island, South Island, North Sand, Middle Sand, South Sand, and two small sands (New West Sand and New East Sand). The center of the group consists of Woody Island and Rocky Island, approximately 5 km (3 mi) south of the southern tip of the eastern extremity of the northern section. The southwest corner of the group is occupied by the Iltis Bank.

The largest island of the Paracels, Woody Island (which has an area of 213 ha (530 acres)), has over 1,000 residents including fishermen and their families, military personnel, and civilian administrators.

=== Crescent group ===
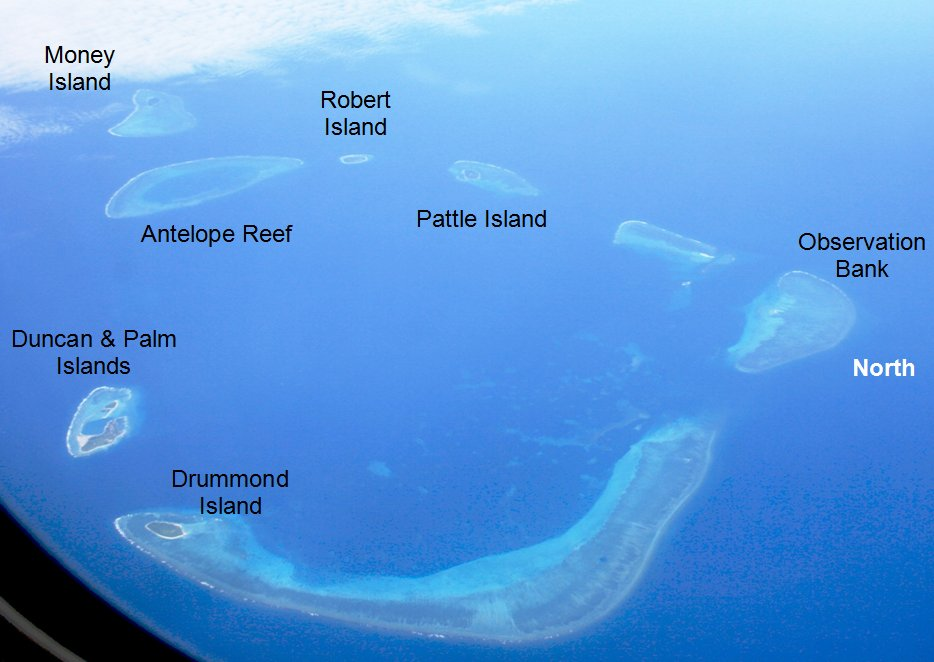
Aerial photo of the Crescent group

Lying about 70 km (43 mi) southwest of the Amphitrite group, at 16.5°N 111.7°E, the Crescent group consists of islands and reefs that form a crescent-like structure from west to east, enclosing a deep central lagoon. The group measures 31 by 15 km (19 by 9 mi) east-west and north–south. All of the islands in the group support vegetation except on their small cays.

The islands are named after former senior figures in the British East India Company (EIC). Three were members of the EIC's 'Select Committee' in Canton: James Drummond, Thomas Pattle and John William Roberts. Jonathan Duncan was Governor in Council of Bombay, and William Taylor Money was Superintendent of the Bombay Marine.

Money Island lies at the southwest extremity of the group, and has some small cays on the southern side. While the island's English name was named after William Taylor Money, the Chinese name is Jin Yin Dao, a literal translation of "money island".
Antelope Reef, submerged at high tide and containing a central lagoon, lies 2.4 km (1.5 mi) east of Money Island.
Northeast of this are Robert Island (also named Round Island) and Pattle Island, separated from each other by a 3.5 km (2.2 mi) wide deep channel. A weather station was built on Pattle Island (by the French) in 1932, and a lighthouse and radio station in 1937.
Northeast of this is Quanfu Dao ("All Wealth Island").
Observation Bank, also named Silver Islet, and the Lesser Silver Islet, are the northernmost of the group and contain a small cay.
Just south of them are Yagong Dao (He Duck) and Xianshe Yu (Salty Hut).

At the eastern side of the group lies a 12 km (7 mi) long boomerang shaped reef with Stone Islet at its north end and Drummond Island at its south end. Near the centre of the reef is Dragon Hole the second deepest known sinkhole in the world.

The Duncan Islands (16°27′N 111°43′E), consisting of Duncan Island and Palm Island, lie approximately 3 km (2 mi) west of Drummond Island and about 8 km (5 mi) east of Antelope Reef. Kuangzai Shazhou (Little Basket) lies about halfway between Palm Island and Antelope Reef.

=== Other features ===
Taking 16°40′N 112°20′E as the center of the Paracel Islands, then the Amphitrite Group is ENE, and the Crescent Group is West.

==== Southeast ====
- Bombay Reef: This elongated reef is situated at the southeastern corner of the Paracel Islands (16°N 112.5°E) and lies approximately 90 km (56 mi) southeast of the Crescent group. With most parts submerged, the reef measures approximately 18 by 5 km (11 by 3 mi) (E-W by N-S). Bombay Reef encloses a deep lagoon with rocks on its edge.

==== Eastern sub-group ====
- Bremen Bank: Located 24 km (15 mi) north of Bombay Reef (16.3°N 112.5°E), is the southwesternmost feature of this subgroup. This submerged shallow bank measures approximately 23 km (14 mi) in length from northeast to southwest. The shallowest area reaches a depth of about 12 meters (39 ft) and is located in the southwestern part of the bank.
- Jehangire Bank: East of the Bremen Bank at 16.3°N 112.7°E
- Neptuna Bank: North of the Bremen Bank at 16.5°N 112.5°E
- Pyramid Rock: NE of the Neptuna Bank at 16.6°N 112.6°E
- Lincoln Island: Surrounded by a coral reef, located 37 km (23 mi) southeast from the Amphitrite Group at 16.7°N 112.7°E, the island is covered with brushes and fairly high trees, including coconut palm trees. The depth increases sharply on the northern and eastern sides of the island but the southern and south western regions are shallow. An observation post on the western side was found by officers of the German government surveys in 1883. In 1948, Great Britain requested France for permission to use the feature for military exercises.

==== Northeast ====
- Dido Bank: Separate from, and NE of, the Eastern sub-group at 16°49′N 112°53′E

==== (ENE: Amphitrite group) ====
16°53′N 112°17′E

==== Northwest ====
- North Reef: Situated approximately 56 km (35 mi) north from the Crescent group and about 70 km (43 mi) west-northwest from the Amphitrite group at 17.1°N 111.5°E, the reef is the most northwesterly feature of the Paracel Islands. Most parts of the reef are submerged. There are rugged rocks are around the edge that are barely above water. There is a passage into the lagoon on the southwestern side of the reef.

==== Inner southwest ====
- Discovery Reef: Measuring approximately 27 km (17 mi) in length from east to west, and 7 km (4 mi) from north to south, the reef is located about 18 km (11 mi) south of the Crescent Group at 16.25°N 111.7°E. Completely submerged, the elongated ring structure is the largest single reef in the Paracel Islands. The reef has two large, deep openings into the lagoon on its southern side.
- Passu Keah: This small reef encloses a shallow lagoon and is located about 12 km (7 mi) south of the eastern side of Discovery Reef at 16.1°N 111.8°E, approximately 37 miles (60 km) east-northeast from Triton Island. The sand cay measures 9 km (6 mi) in length.

==== Outer southwest ====
- Triton Island: The sand cay supports vegetation and stands on a steep-sided coral reef measuring 1.5 km (1 mi) in length. This southwesternmost island of the Paracels is situated about 56 km (35 mi) from Discovery Reef at 15.8°N 111.2°E.

==== Central ====
- Vuladdore Reef: Located slightly south of the center of the group at 16.3°N 112°E, this mostly submerged reef is orientated east–west and measures approximately 12 km (7 mi) by 3 km (2 mi). Some small spiral rocks are to be seen on the reef.

=== List of entities ===
English name	Chinese name	Vietnamese name	Coordinates	Area (ha)	Height (m)	Location / notes
Amphitrite group	Xuande Qundao (宣德群島)	Nhóm An Vĩnh	16°53′N 112°17′E			ENE
Woody Island	Yongxing Dao (永興島)	Đảo Phú Lâm	16°50′N 112°20′E	210	?	Center of Amphitrite group
Rocky Island	Shidao (石島)	Đảo Đá	16°50′40″N 112°20′50″E	8	14	Connected to (NE of) Woody Is.
West Sand	Xisha Zhou (西沙洲)	Cồn Cát Tây	16°58′39″N 112°12′43″E	4	0	NW of Amphitrite group
Tree Island	Zhaoshudao (趙述島)	Đảo Cây	16°58′48″N 112°16′16″E	22	0	N of Amphitrite group
("Seven Sisters")	Qilian Yu Subgroup (七連嶼)					NE of Amphitrite Group
North Island	Bei Dao (北島)	Đảo Bắc	16°57′50″N 112°18′34″E	4	0	N1 of Seven Islets
Middle Island	Zhong Dao (中島)	Đảo Trung	16°57′18″N 112°19′28″E	13	0	N2 of Seven Islets
South Island	Nan Dao (南島)	Đảo Nam	16°56′47″N 112°20′04″E	17	0	N3 of Seven Islets
North Sand	Bei Shazhou (北沙洲)	Cồn Cát Bắc	16°56′16″N 112°20′30″E	2	0	N4 of Seven Islets
Middle Sand	Zhong Shazhou (中沙洲)	Cồn Cát Trung	16°56′03″N 112°20′37″E	5	0	N5 of Seven Islets
South Sand	Nan Shazhou (南沙洲)	Cồn Cát Nam	16°55′45″N 112°20′45″E	6	0	N6 of Seven Islets
(New West Sand)	Xixin Shazhou (西新沙洲)	-	16°55′N 112°19′E	0.2	0	N7a of Seven Islets (7W)
(New East Sand)	Dongxin Shazhou (东新沙洲)	-	16°55′24″N 112°20′45″E	0.4	0	N7b of Seven Islets (7E); South of South Sand
Iltis Bank	Yin Shuo Tan (銀铄滩)	Bãi Bình Sơn	16°46′N 112°13′E		-10	SW of Woody Island
Crescent group	Yongle Qundao (永樂群島)	Nhóm Lưỡi Liềm	16°30′N 111°40′E			
Money Island	Jinyin Dao (金銀島)	Đảo Quang Ảnh	16°26′52″N 111°30′30″E	36	6	W end of Crescent group
Antelope Reef	Lingyang Jiao (羚羊礁)	Đá Hải Sâm	16°27′N 111°35′E		0	W Crescent Group, S of Robert Is.
Robert Island (Round Island)	Ganquan Dao (甘泉島)	Đảo Hữu Nhật	16°30′20″N 111°35′07″E	30	8	W of Crescent group; Has a well
Pattle Island	Shanhu Dao (珊瑚島)	Đảo Hoàng Sa	16°32′02″N 111°36′25″E	31	9	N of Robert Island Has a well
(East Shanhu Shoal)	Shanhu Dong'ansha (珊瑚东暗沙)	Bãi Đèn Pha	16°32′00″N 111°37′42″E		0	E of Pattle Island
(All Wealth)	Quanfu Dao (全富島)	Đảo Ốc Hoa	16°34′29″N 111°40′24″E	2	0	NE of Pattle, SW of Observation Bank
Observation Bank (Silver Islet)	Yin Yu (銀嶼)	Bãi Xà Cừ	16°34′50″N 111°42′30″E	1	0	NE of Crescent group
(Lesser Silver Islet)	Yinyu Zi (銀嶼仔)	Bãi Tiểu Xà Cừ	16°34′45″N 111°42′15″E	0.2	0	SE of Silver Islet
(He Duck)	Yagong Dao (鴨公島)	Đảo Ba Ba	16°34′00″N 111°41′11″E	1	0	SW of Observation Bank
(Salty Hut)	Xianshe Yu (咸舍嶼)	(Đá Trà Tây?)	16°32′N 111°42′E		0	SW of Observation Bank, W of Stone Islet
(Stone Islet)	Shi Yu (石嶼)	(Đảo Lưỡi Liềm?)	16°30′N 111°46′E	0.2	0	E of Crescent group
Drummond Island	Jinqing Dao (晉卿島)	Đảo Duy Mộng	16°27′50″N 111°44′30″E	21	3	E of Crescent group
Duncan Island	Chenhang Dao (琛航島)	Đảo Quang Hòa	16°27′05″N 111°42′45″E	48	?	S of Crescent group
Palm Island	Guangjin Dao (廣金島)	Đảo Quang Hòa Tây	16°27′04″N 111°42′07″E	6	?	S of Crescent group
(Little Basket)	Kuangzai Shazhou (筐仔沙洲)	Đảo Sâm Cầm	16°26′49″N 111°36′24″E	1	0	SE of Antelope Reef
Eastern sub-group						
Bremen Bank	Binmei Tan (濱湄灘)	Bãi Châu Nhai	16°20′00″N 112°25′40″E		-11	Eastern sub-group
Jehangire Bank	Zhanhan Tan (湛涵灘)	Bãi Quảng Nghĩa	16°19′40″N 112°41′10″E		-12	Eastern sub-group
Neptuna Bank	Beibian Lang (北邊廊)	Bãi Thuỷ Tề	16°30′50″N 112°32′42″E		-15	Eastern sub-group
Pyramid Rock	Gaojian Shi (高尖石)	Hòn Tháp	16°34′36.5″N 112°38′32.5″E	4	5	Eastern sub-group
Lincoln Island	Dong Dao (東島)	Đảo Linh Côn	16°40′N 112°44′E	160	5	Eastern sub-group "Water can be found on the island"
Other features						
Discovery Reef	Huaguang Jiao (華光礁)	Đá Lồi	16°13′52″N 111°41′35″E		-4	Inner SW
Passu Keah	Panshi Yu (盤石嶼)	Đảo Bạch Quy	16°03′24″N 111°45′42″E	40	0	Inner SW, S of Discovery Reef
Herald Bank	Songtao Tan (嵩燾灘)	Bãi Ốc Tai Voi	15°43′N 112°13′E		-236	ESE
Bombay Reef	Langhua Jiao (浪花礁)	Đá Bông Bay	16°02′41″N 112°31′06″E		0	SE
Vuladdore Reef	Yuzhuo Jiao (玉琢礁)	Đá Chim Én	16°20′50″N 112°01′30″E		0	Central
Dido Bank	Xidu Tan (西渡灘)	Bãi Gò Nổi	16°49′N 112°53′E		-23	NE
North Reef	Bei Jiao (北礁)	Đá Bắc	17°05′25″N 111°30′13″E		0	NW
Triton Island	Zhongjian Dao (中建岛)	Đảo Tri Tôn	15°47′N 111°12′E	120	3	Outer SW

=== Satellite images ===
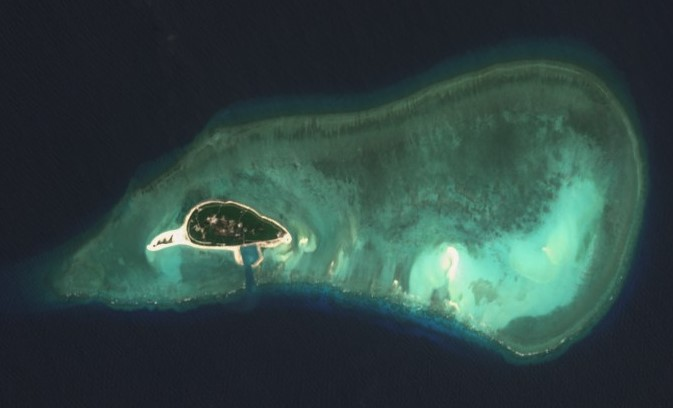
Money Island

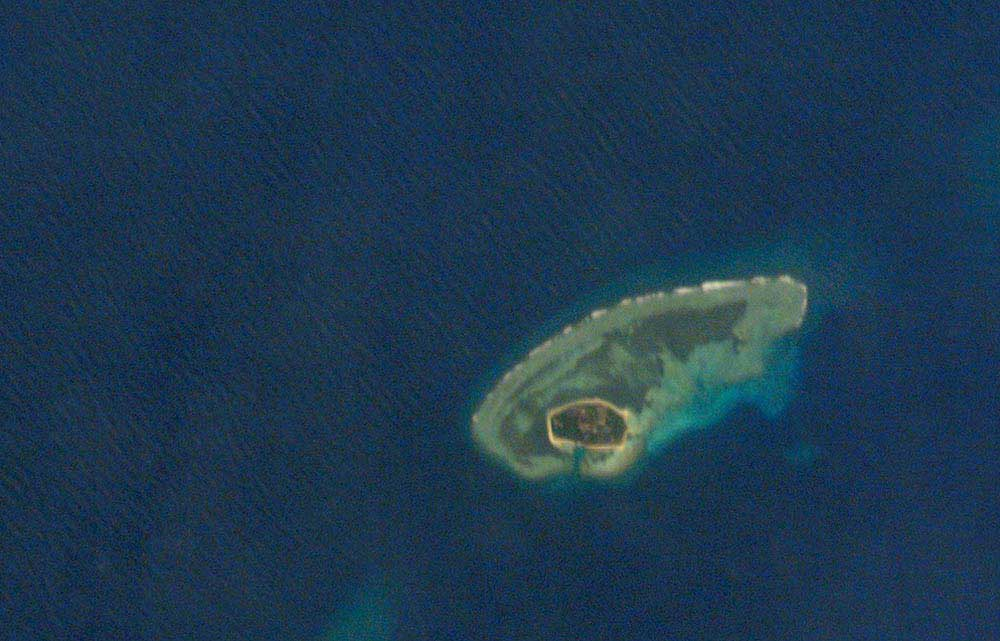
Pattle Island

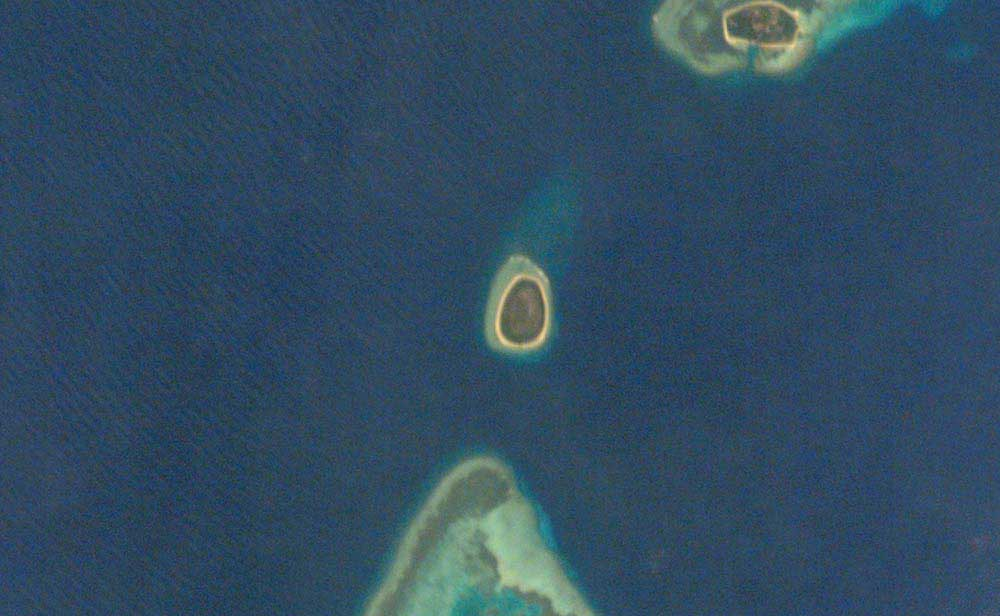
Robert Island

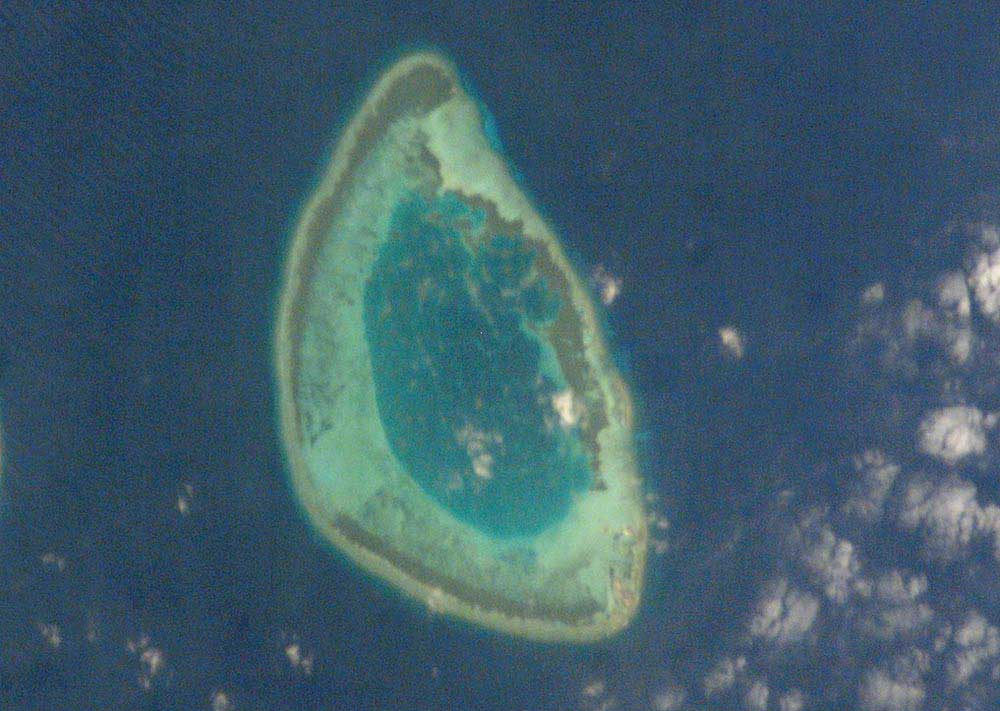
Antelope Reef

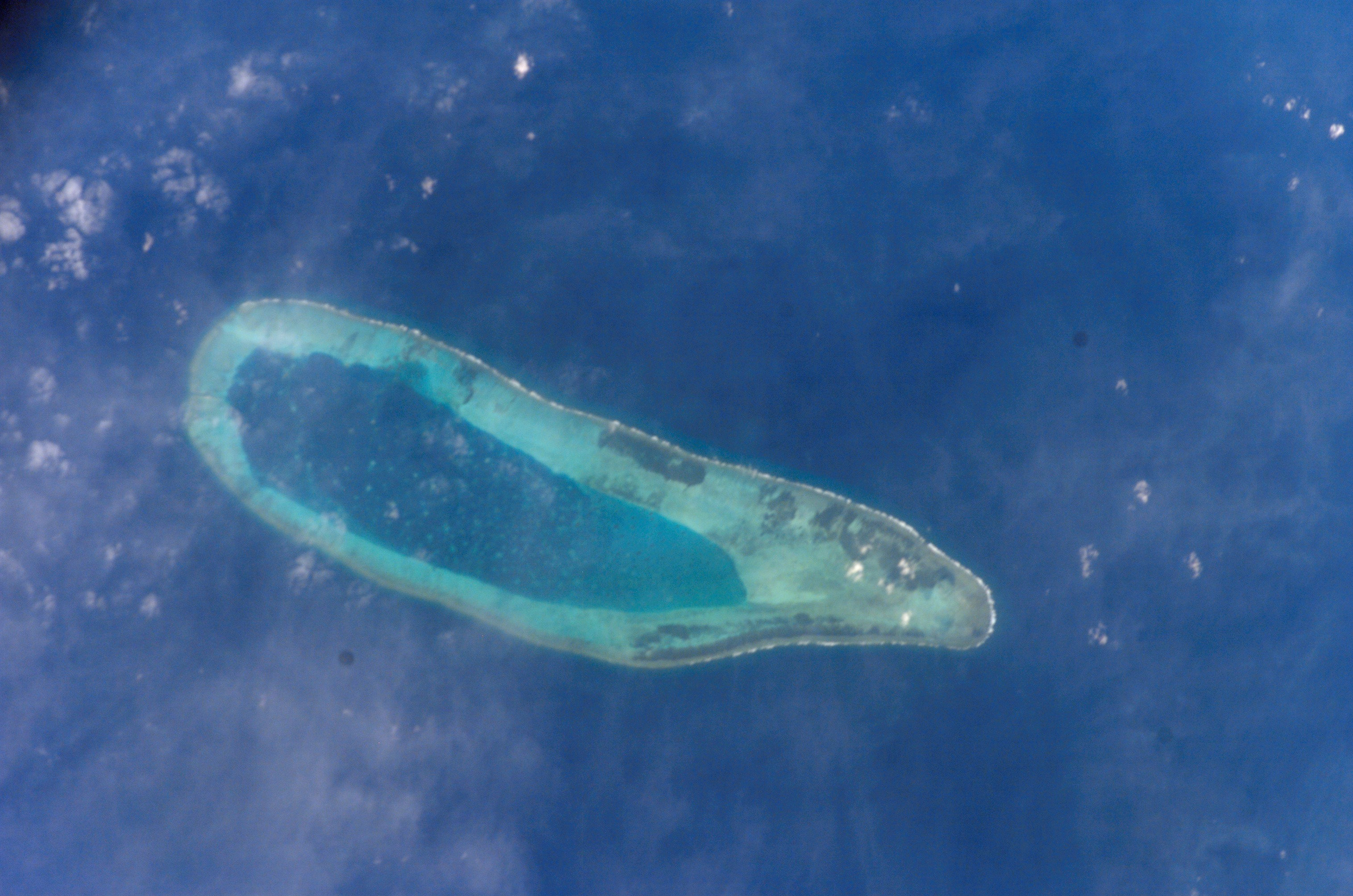
Bombay Reef

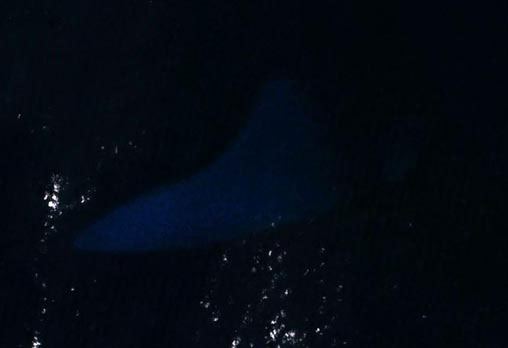
Bremen Bank

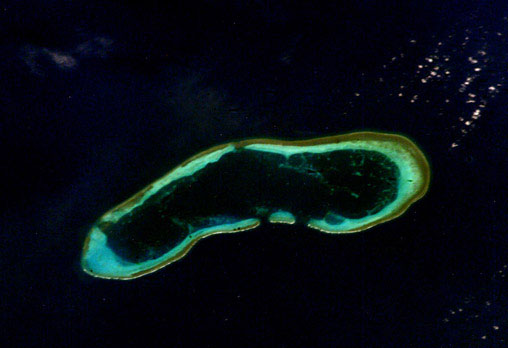
Discovery Reef

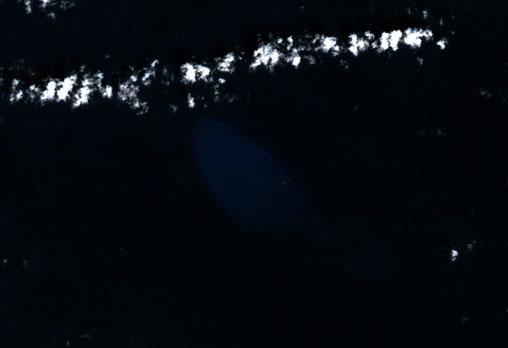
Iltis Bank

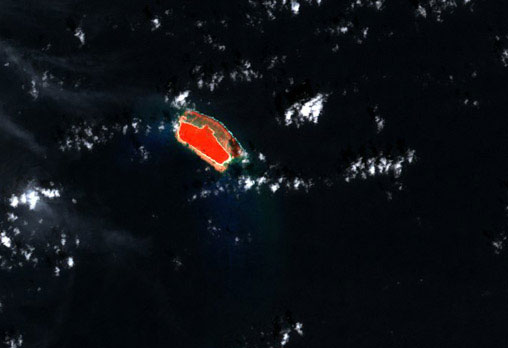
Lincoln Island

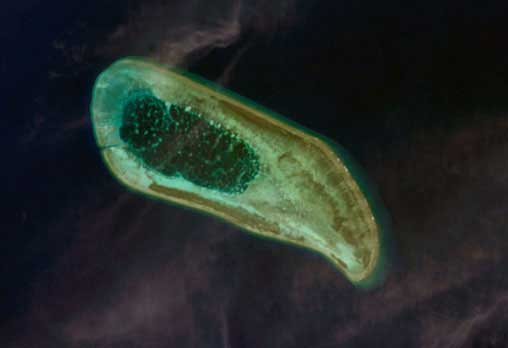
North Reef

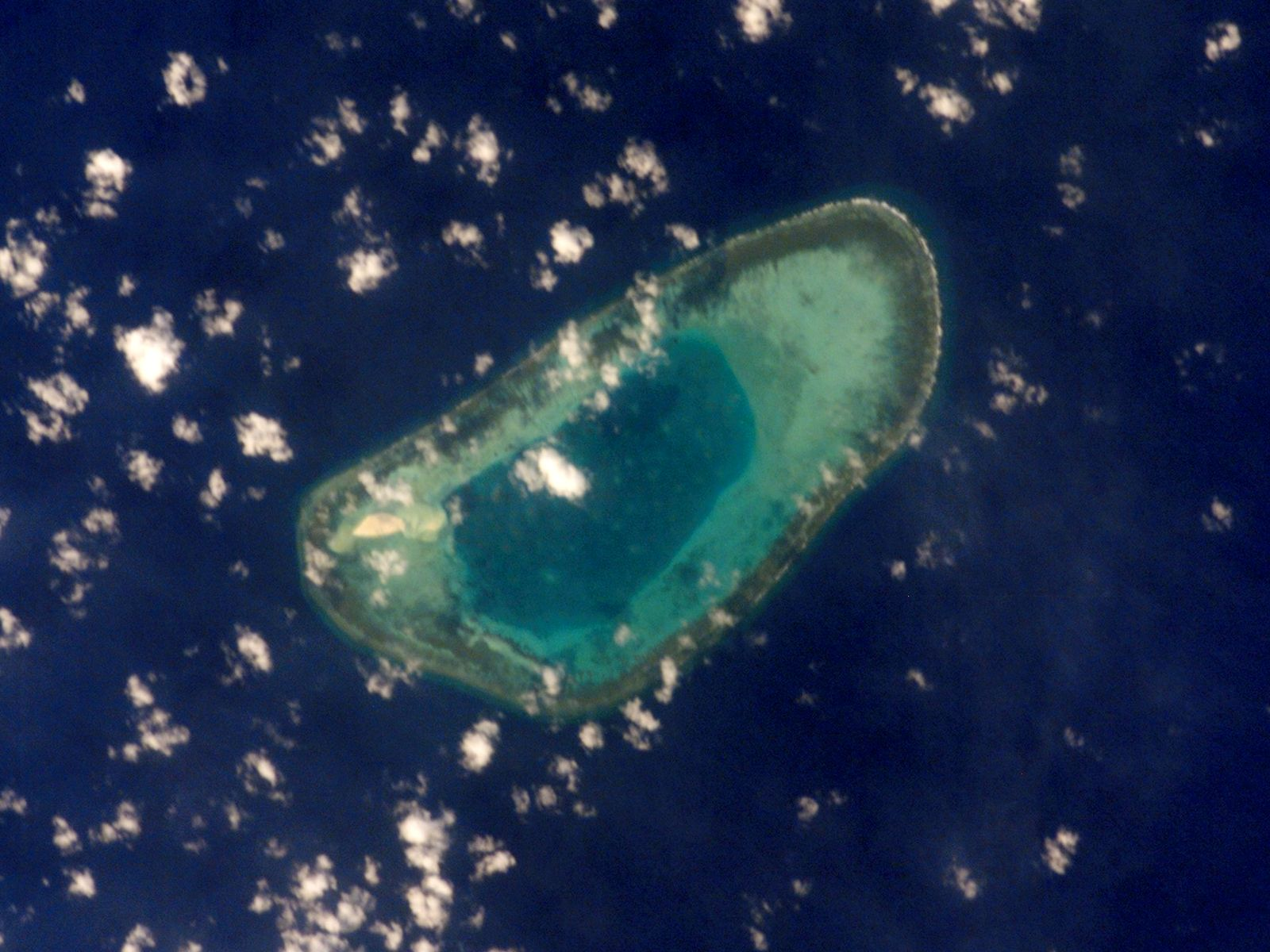
Passu Keah Reef

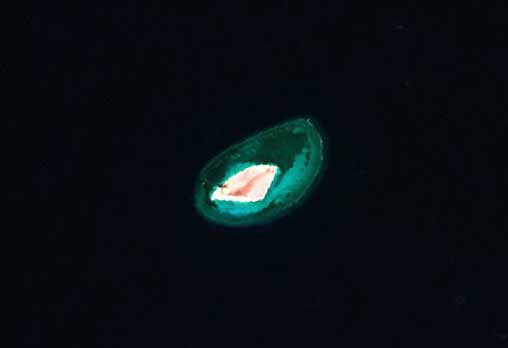
Triton Island

== Etymology ==
=== Chinese ===
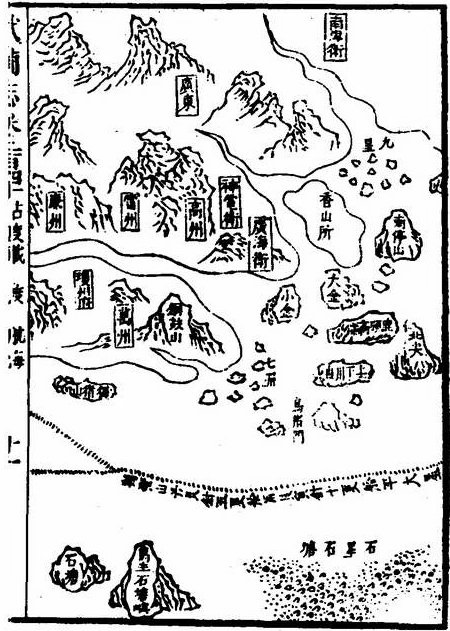
South China Sea islands along the bottom of the Mao Kun map

The Chinese wrote about large groups of maritime features in the area. Names such as changsha, shitang, shichuang and others were used. The Song dynasty book Zhu Fan Zhi mentions Qianli Changsha (千里長沙, lit. "Thousand-Mile Long Sands") and Wanli Shichuang (萬里石床 lit. "Ten-Thousand-Mile Rock Bed"). The Yuan dynasty travel book Daoyi Zhilüe describes Wanli Shitang (萬里石塘, lit. "Ten-Thousand Mile Rock Pool") as comprising three veins extending from Chaozhou to Borneo, Côn Sơn Island, and Java. The History of Yuan uses the terms Qizhouyang (七洲洋, lit. "Ocean of Seven Islands") and Wanli Shitang. In the Mao Kun map depicting 15th century Ming Treasure Voyages, groups of islands were named Shitang (石塘), Wansheng Shitangyu (萬生石塘嶼), and Shixing Shitang (石星石塘). Another Ming dynasty work, Haiyu (On the Sea), uses Wanli Shitang and Wanli Changsha. Qing dynasty maps and book Hai Lu (Illustrations of the Sea) refer to islands and other features as Changsha, Shitang, and Qizhouyang. A sea chart from the Daoguang era, Yiban Lu (Particular Illustrations) by Zheng Guangzu, uses Xisha (西沙, lit. "Western Sands/Shoals") to refer to the Paracels. Xisha became the standard name for the Paracels in the 20th century and was used in maps published by the Republic of China in 1935 and 1947.

=== European ===
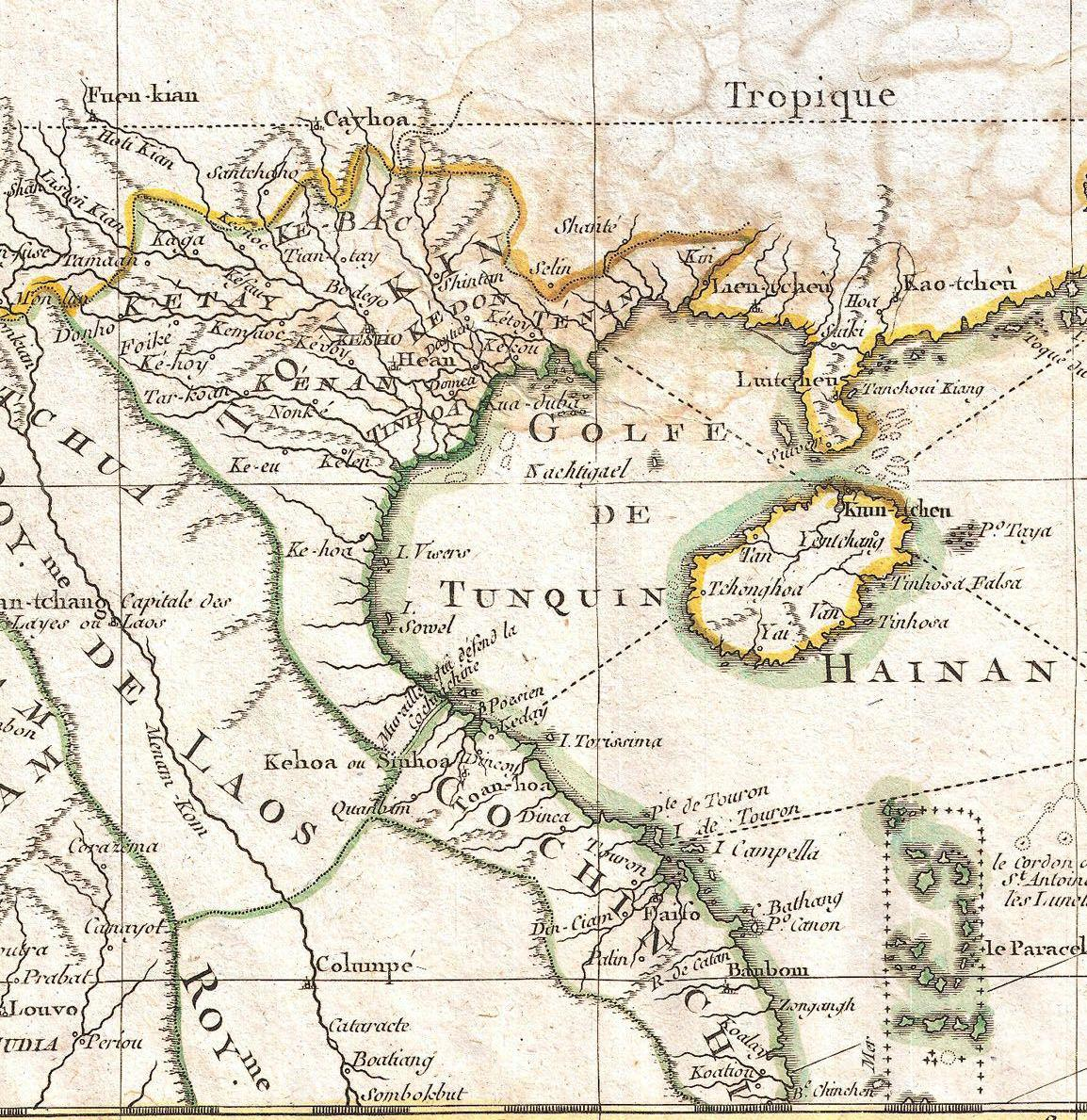
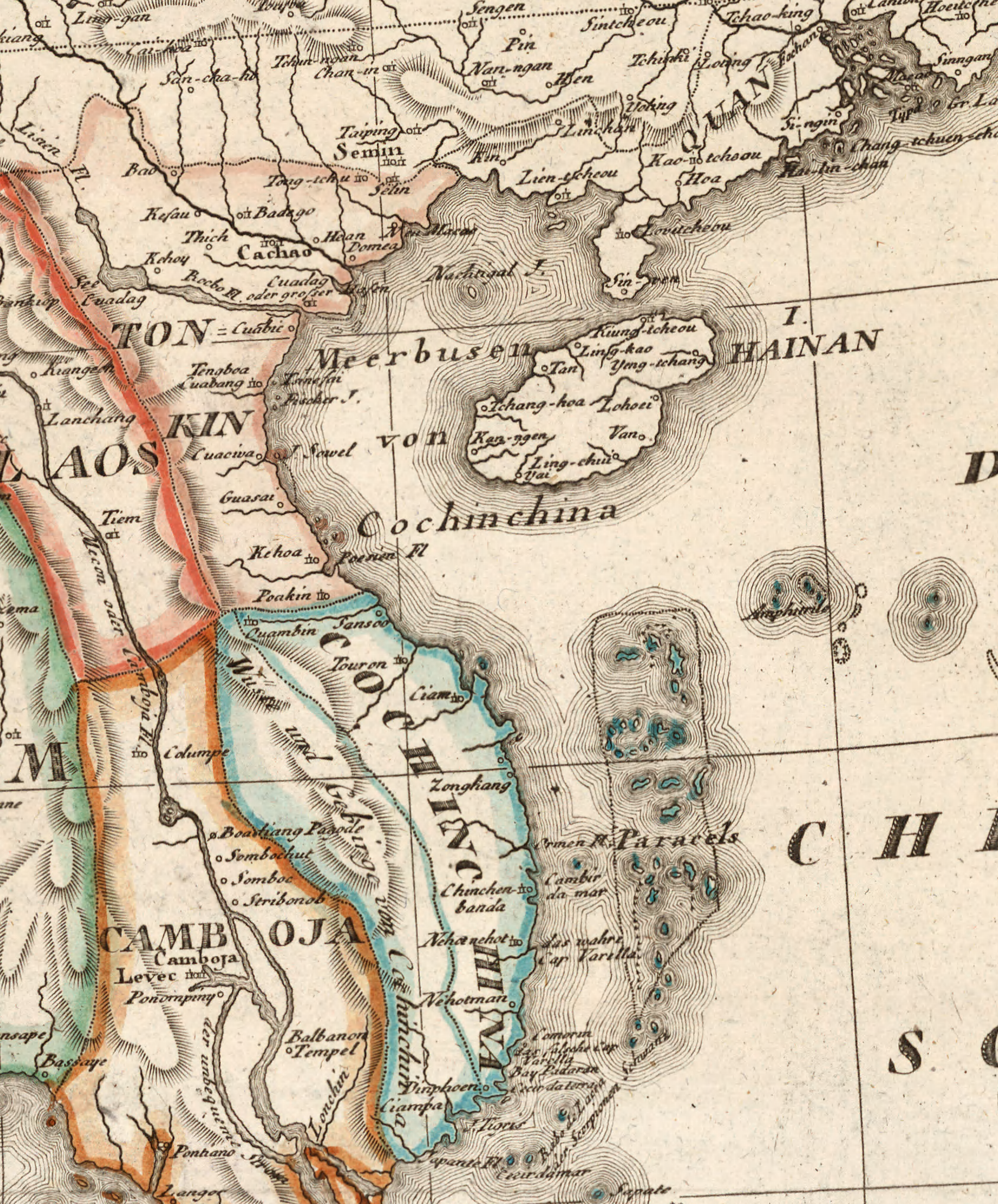
Paracel Islands misidentified in 18th-19th century European maps

Portuguese maps from the early 16th century marked a group of ilhas allagadas (lit. "flooded islands") in the area. They were later named y as del atabalero after the atabaque hand drum, due to the concial shape assigned to the entire group. The Paracels and the Spratlys were not distinguished separately at the time. From the mid-1500s Portuguese cartographers began referring to the group as Ilhas do Pracel, although y as del atabalero was still used for some time. The word Paracel is likely a variant of pracel or parcel, from the Spanish word placer used by Portuguese and Spanish navigators to designate shallow sandy seas or submerged banks, such as the Placer de los Roques.

Similar names entered Dutch and French maps, such as the 1617 Chart of Asia and eight city maps published by Willem Blaeu as well as the 1747 Kaart van de Kusten van Kochinchine, van Tunquin, en Gedeeltelyk van de Chineesse-kus / Carte des Costes de Cochin chine, Tunquin, et Partie de celles de la Chine (lit. "Map of the coasts of Cochinchina, Tonkin, and part of the Chinese coast") published by Pieter de Hondt/Pierre d'Hondt.

The 1634 Route through Quảng Nam map depicting Bãi Cát Vàng–the Golden Sandbank

Before the 19th century, the area was primarily known only as "dangerous grounds" in English sources. In the late 1700s and early 1800s, greater attention was paid to mapping the islands in detail, notably by hydrographers such as Alexander Dalrymple and James Horsburgh, the latter of whom concluded that most of the Paracel islands indicated in earlier European maps were mistakes of sailors who really saw the tops of coastal mountains. A better picture of the area emerged in British charts by the mid-1800s.

=== Philippine ===
Due to confusion, the Spratly Islands were referred to as the Paracels in the mid-1900s.

=== Vietnamese ===
The Vietnamese call the islands Hoang Sa, (黃沙, lit. Yellow Sands), and this name is found in Vietnamese documents dating back to 1483 and An Nam quốc họa đồ published in 1490. In the modern language system, it is written as Hoàng Sa or Cát Vàng. They all have the same meaning—the Yellow Sands or the Yellow Sandbank. Before the early 19th century, the Spratly Islands to the south were considered as part of the Hoàng Sa. It was not until the reign of Emperor Minh Mạng (1820–1841) that the Spratlys were distinctly designated as Vạn Lý Trường Sa (萬里長沙, lit. Ten-Thousand-Mile Long Sands).

== Infrastructure and natural resources ==
=== Infrastructure ===
China has historically had a presence in the islands and, as of 2016, was engaged in major infrastructure development to support its territorial claims over the archipelago, and as a result there has been, and continues to be, a lot of construction activity. In recent years Woody Island has acquired an upgraded airport, an upgraded sea port, and a city hall. There is a post office, hospital and a school on Woody Island.

=== Fresh water ===
There is limited supply of fresh water on the islands. In 2012, it was reported that China (PRC) planned to build a solar-energy-powered desalination plant on the islands. In 2016, it was reported that the first desalination plant was activated. This reduces the occupant's reliance on water supply coming in barrels by boat.

=== Electricity ===
Both wind and solar powered facilities exist, but most of the electricity is supplied by diesel generators. This led to considerations by the Chinese government to use floating nuclear power plants. It was reported in October 2020 that an experimental wave power generator was installed off Woody Island.

On land, in August 2020, Millennium Energy Viêtnam Co., Ltd, a member of Millennium Petroleum Corporation announced plans to develop a 600 ha, US$15 billion LNG project in the south Vân Phong area of the Khánh Hòa province, i.e. Nha Trang, near by Cam Ranh, with capacity of 9,600 MW, project which include a dock warehouse system, may be terminals, to provide gas to the power plant as well as distribute LNG in South-East Asia, supplied presumably by the offshore gas deposit along the coast of Quảng Nam province, discovered by ExxonMobil in October 2011, at 200 nautical miles (roughly 370 km), surrounded the Paracel Islands which China has control since 1974.

=== Communication ===
The Chinese postal zip code of the island is 572000, and the telephone area code is +86 (898). There is cellphone reception on the island.

=== Transport ===
There is an airport on Woody Island with a 2,400 meters (7,900 ft) long runway, which can handle take-offs and landings of Boeing-737s or planes of similar size. Flight services operate on the Haikou – Xisha route. There are three main roads on Woody Island as well as an 800 meters (2,600 ft) long cement causeway that connects Woody Island and Rocky Island. Extensive port facilities have been constructed on Duncan Island.

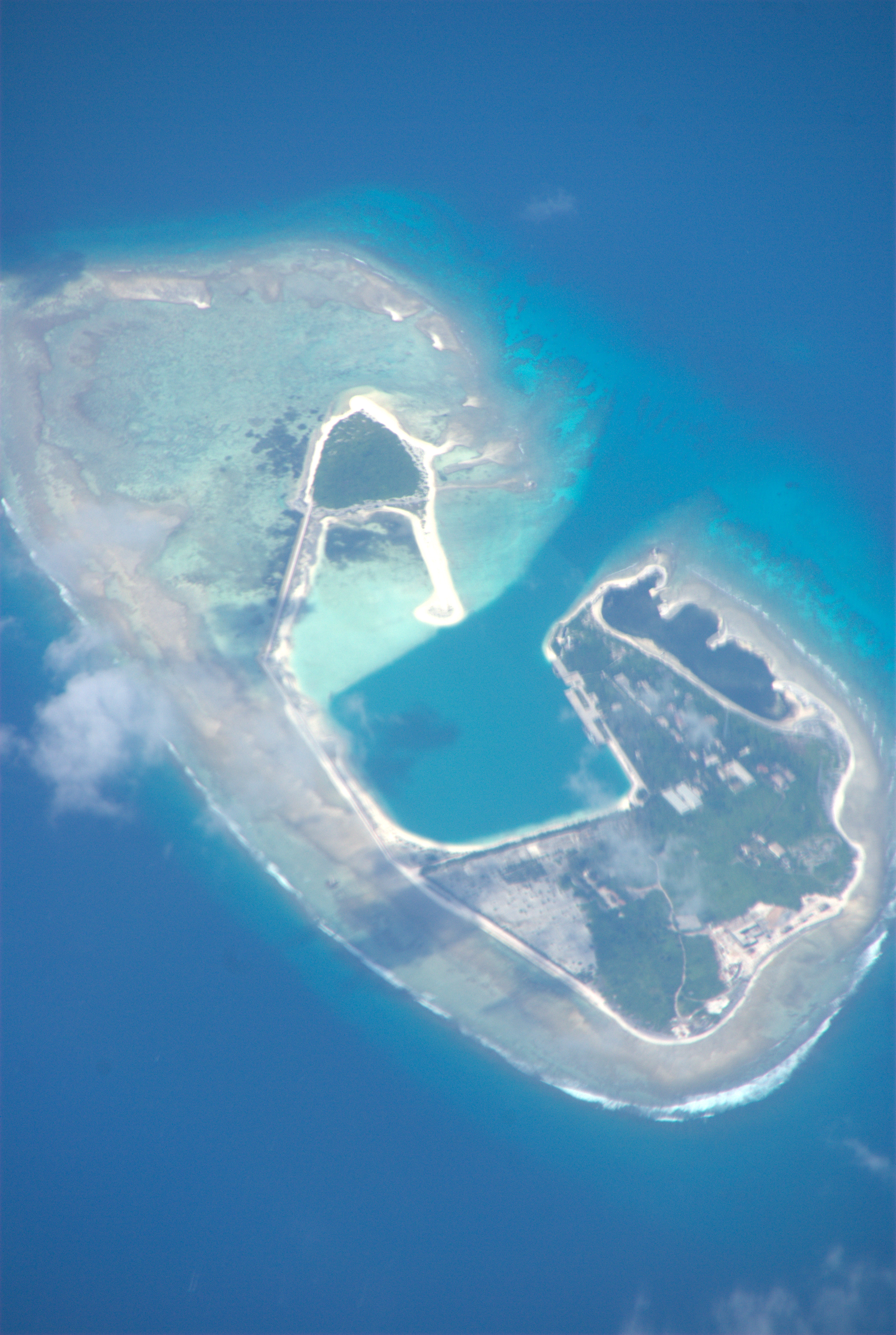
Harbor developments between the Duncan Islands (December 2012)

=== Ecology and tourism ===
Paracel Islands' geographical and ecological traits are often likened as "China's Maldives", however, controversial conflicts between environment conservation and human activities including military operations, developments, and tourism on Paracel Islands have become public concerns in recent years. Local ecosystem include endangered fish such as whale sharks, oceanic birds, marine mammals (at least historically) such as blue whales, fin whales, and Chinese white dolphins, and marine reptile species such as critically endangered green sea turtles, hawksbill sea turtles, and Leatherback sea turtles; however, direct damaging of the ecosystem by military group and tourists has been documented. Governmental actions to cease illegal tourism are ongoing.

The islands have been open for tourists since 1997. Chinese tourists can take a 20-hour ferry to the Islands, paying up to US$2,000 for a 5-day cruise, and wait for their applications to be accepted. The BBC article states that "Chinese tourism has strong political implications, as the Chinese tourists are being used as 'foot soldiers of China' by Beijing to further China's territorial claims there". The video also states "Vietnam is considered unlikely to send military vessels to stop them".

There are two museums on Woody Island; a Naval Museum and a Maritime Museum. In April 2012, the Vice-Mayor and officials from the Haikou Municipal Government made several announcements about developing new docking facilities and hotels within the Crescent Group - on Duncan and Drummond Islands specifically. Promotion of the naturally unspoilt reef system was cited as the driver for new tourism potential with other such reefs, such as the Great Barrier Reef in Australia, now placed under threat of extinction due to human activities. However, according to The China Post, this was denied by a PRC Government official in April 2012, due to sensitivities surrounding the islands.

== Territorial disputes ==
=== Claims ===
The ownership of the islands remains hotly contested. The People's Republic of China (PRC) on mainland China, Vietnam, and the Republic of China (ROC) on Taiwan all claim sovereignty. The PRC has controlled the entire archipelago since the Battle of the Paracel Islands in January 1974. In July 2012, China (PRC) established Sansha, Hainan Province, as administering the area. As of February 2017, 20 PRC outposts, including small harbours, built on reclaimed land have been reported in the Paracels. The majority of the Paracel islands lie within 200 nm of both China's and Vietnam's geographic baselines under the United Nations Convention on the Law of the Sea.

=== Historical perspectives ===
The nation states involved have differing historic perspectives as to sovereignty of the Paracel Islands with the Chinese claiming an interest since their discovery of the islands in the second century BC. A Vietnamese interest was crystallised in the view of one commentator by the planting of their flag in 1816. In 1836, the Vietnamese installed ten 5-meter steles with inscriptions that claimed the islands.

Between 1881 and 1883 the German navy surveyed the islands continuously for three months each year without seeking the permission of either France or China. No protest was issued by either government and the German government published the results of the survey in 1885. After the 1884–1885 Sino-French War, France officially gained control of Annam and Tonkin as protectorates and fully established French colonial rule in Vietnam by signing a number of treaties with the Chinese and Vietnamese governments, including the Tientsin Accord, Treaty of Huế (1884) and Treaty of Tientsin (1885), stipulating that China was to give up their claims of suzerainty over Vietnam.

In 1909 the Chinese sent an expedition to claim and map the islands in reaction to Japanese interest in exploiting the guano there. In the 1910s and 20s, the French accepted Chinese sovereignty of the Paracels. Around 1930 the French authorities began to push for a claim on behalf of Annam based on the protectorate's activities in the seventeenth century but were skeptical because Annam had done little to uphold its past claims.

In 1932 France formally claimed the Paracel Islands and in 1933 the Spratly Islands. Initially there seems to have been confusion in China at the time as the Paracel Islands were not recognised as a separate geographical entity and formal protests did not immediately follow. China and Japan both protested. In 1933, France seized the Paracels and Spratlys, announced their annexation, formally included them in French Indochina, and built a couple of weather stations on them, but did not disturb the numerous Chinese fishermen it found there. In 1939 during the Second Sino-Japanese War, Japan took over the Paracel Islands on the pretext of them being a Chinese territory and placed them under the administration of either Taiwan or Hainan, then under its control.

The Paracels and Spratlys were handed over to the Republic of China's control after the 1945 surrender of Japan, since the Allied powers had assigned the Republic of China to accept the Japanese surrender in the area. At the end of the war (Asian-Pacific Region), the ROC occupied the Paracels, Spratlys, and other islands in the South China Sea in October and November 1946. During the San Francisco Peace Conference of 1951, the USSR motioned for the Paracels and the Spratlys to be awarded to China, but the motion was rejected by a vote of 46 to 3. In the Geneva accord of 1954, Japan formally renounced all of its claims to, inter alia, the South China Sea islands that it had occupied during World War II. After World War II ended, the Republic of China was consistently the "most active claimant" of the islands. It garrisoned Woody Island, the main island of the Amphitrite group, and posted Chinese flags and markers on it. France tried, but failed, to force the ROC to leave, although the weather station on Prattle Island continued to be operated by French Indochina. The aim of the ROC was to block French claims. In December 1947, the ROC drew up a map showing its eleven-dotted line U-shaped claim to the entire South China Sea, including the Spratly and Paracel Islands as Chinese territory.

After the communists gained control of China in 1949 after victory in the Chinese Civil War, they occupied Woody Island. By 1955 South Vietnam had taken possession of the Crescent Group. North Vietnam's prime minister Phạm Văn Đồng recognized Chinese sovereignty over the Paracels in 1958. After winning the Vietnam war, North Vietnam retracted its recognition, saying it had done so to receive aid from China in fighting the Americans, according to Pham's discussion in June 1977 with China's Li Xiannan.

After the Battle of the Paracel Islands in January 1974, the People's Republic of China expelled the Vietnamese from the Crescent Group and took full control of the Paracels. In 1976 the Communist Party of Vietnam (CPV) tried to persuade Beijing to acknowledge Vietnam's sovereignty over the Spratly Islands to the south, offering in return to recognize China's claim over the Paracel Islands. However, when this effort failed, Vietnam's government, now under CPV control, asserted its claim over both archipelagos.

==== China ====
===== 618–1279 =====
There are some Chinese cultural relics in the Paracel islands dating from the Tang and Song eras, (Note: Hainan was a part of Guangdong by then.) and there is some evidence of Chinese habitation on the islands during these periods, though the relics are more likely washed ashore from shipwrecked junks. According to the Wujing Zongyao, a book published in the Northern Song dynasty in 1044, the Song government then included the Islands in the patrol areas of the Navy of the Court.

===== 1279–1368 =====
The Yuan dynasty travel book Daoyi Zhilüe describes Wanli Shitang (萬里石塘, lit. "Ten-Thousand Mile Rock Pool") as comprising three veins extending from Chaozhou to Borneo, Côn Sơn Island, and Java. In 1279 the Yuan emperor sent the high-level official and astronomer, Guo Shoujing, to the South China Sea to survey and measure the islands and the surrounding sea area. Guo's base of survey was claimed by China to be located in the Paracel Islands, although this is considered unlikely by many Chinese scholars. His activities were recorded in the Yuan Shi, or History of Yuan. According to the Yuan Shi, the South China Sea islands were within the boundary of the Yuan dynasty. Maps published in the Yuan era invariably included the Changsha (the Paracels) and the Shitang (the Spratlys) within the domain of Yuan.

===== 1368–1912 =====
Relevant local annals and other historic materials of the Ming (1368–1644) and the Qing (1644–1912) dynasties continued to make reference to the South China Sea islands as China's territory. The Qiongzhou Prefecture (the highest administrative authority in Hainan), exercised jurisdiction over the Paracel and Spratly Islands in the Ming and Qing Dynasties.

In the 19th century, Europeans found that Chinese fishermen from Hainan annually sojourned on the Paracel and Spratly Islands for part of the year. For three months each year between 1881 and 1884, the German Imperial Navy sent two boats (the ship Freya and the warship Iltis) to study and map the Paracel Islands without either seeking the permission of or incurring protest by the Chinese government. This mission was finished without any problems and the German Admiralty published the results in 1885 in a document called "Die Paracel-Inseln" (The Paracel Islands). In the period 1884 to 1885 the Tientsin Accord and Treaty of Tientsin were signed by Chinese representatives to attempt to address issues from an undeclared war between France acting on behalf of its protectorate territories in Vietnam and China. During this period between the treaties the Chinese did claim the Paracels. In 1909, Zhang Renjun (Chinese: 張人駿), the Viceroy of Liangguang, ordered Guangdong Fleet Admiral Li Zhun (李準) to sail to the Paracel Islands. In June, with over 170 sailors in three warships named Fubo (伏波號), Guangjin (廣金號) and Shenhang (琛航號), he inspected 15 islands, erected stone tablets engraved with each island's name, raised China's flag and fired cannons to declare the islands "sacred territory of China", which France did not protest. In 1910, the Qing government decided to invite Chinese merchants to contract for the administration of the development affairs of the South China Sea islands, and demanded that officials shall provide protection and maintenance in order to highlight Chinese territory and protect its titles and interests.

===== 1912–1950s =====
After the fall of the Qing dynasty, the new Government of Guangdong Province decided to place the Paracel Islands under the jurisdiction of the Ya Xian County of Hainan Prefecture in 1911. The Southern Military Government in 1921 reaffirmed the 1911 decision. China continued to exercise authority over the South China Sea islands by such means as granting licenses or contracts to private Chinese merchants for the development and exploitation of guano and other resources on those islands and protesting against foreign nations' claims, occupations, and other activities. For example, in May 1928, the Guangdong provincial government sent a naval vessel, the Hai-jui (海瑞號), with an investigation team organized by the provincial government and Sun Yat-Sen University to investigate and survey the islets, after which the investigation team produced a detailed Report of Surveys on the Paracel Islands.

On July 27, 1932, the Chinese Foreign Ministry instructed the Chinese Envoy to France to lodge a diplomatic protest to the French Foreign Ministry and to deny France's claims to the Paracel Islands. On November 30 of the same year, Zhu Zhaoshen, a high-level inspection official of the Chinese Foreign Ministry, issued public correspondence Number 66 to the French Consul in Guangzhou, reiterating that "it is absolutely beyond doubt that the Xisha [Paracel] Islands fall within the boundary of China". Despite repeated Chinese protests, French troops, who had colonized French Indochina in the 19th century, invaded and occupied the Paracel Islands on July 3, 1938. This took place shortly after the breakout of the Second Sino-Japanese War, when the armed forces of China and Japan were busy elsewhere. Three days later, on July 6, the Japanese Foreign Ministry also issued a declaration in protest of the French occupation

The statement of Great Britain and France made respectively in 1900 and 1921 already declared that the Xisha [Paracel] Islands were part of the Administrative Prefecture of Hainan Island. Therefore, the current claims made by An'nam or France to the Xisha Islands are totally unjustifiable.

During the Second World War, the Japanese expelled the French troops and took over the islands in spite of the 1938 declarations. The Spratlys and the Paracels were conquered by Japan in 1939. Japan administered the Spratlys via Taiwan's jurisdiction and the Paracels via Hainan's jurisdiction. The Paracels and Spratlys were handed over to Republic of China control after the 1945 surrender of Japan, since the Allied powers had assigned the Republic of China to receive Japanese surrenders in that area. At the end of the war (Asian-Pacific Region), Nationalist China formally retook the Paracels, Spratlys and other islands in the South China Sea in October and November 1946. In the Geneva accord of 1954 Japan formally renounced all of its claims to, inter alia, the South China Sea islands which it had occupied during the World War II. After WW2 ended, the Republic of China was the "most active claimant". The Republic of China then garrisoned Woody Island in the Paracels in 1946 and posted Chinese flags and markers on it; France tried, but failed, to make them leave Woody island. The aim of the Republic of China was to block the French claims. In December 1947, the Republic of China drew up a map showing its eleven-dotted line U-shaped claim to the entire South China Sea, including the Spratly and Paracel Islands as Chinese territory.

==== Vietnam ====
===== 15th–17th centuries =====
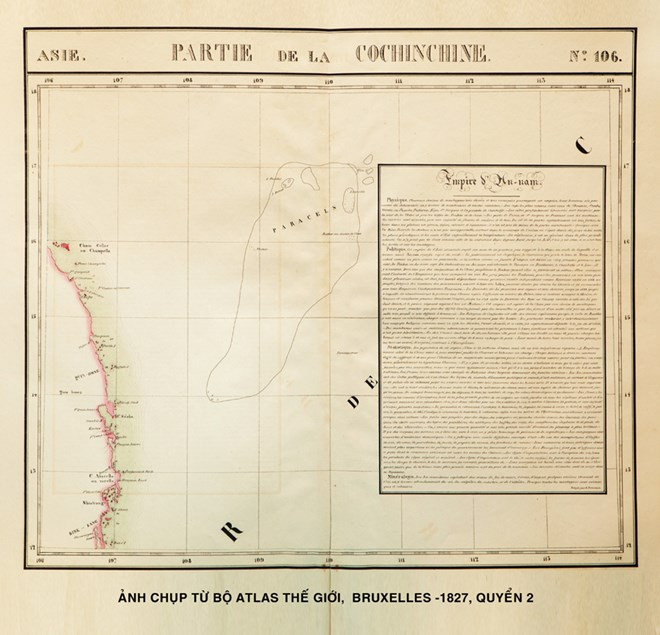
Atlas produced by Belgian geographer Philippe Vandermaelen (1795–1869), published in 1827 in Belgium, showing Paracel Islands is a part of Vietnam

- 1460–1497, under the reign of Emperor Lê Thánh Tông of the Lê dynasty (1428–1789), the Vietnamese began conducting commercial activities on and around Hoàng Sa, including harvesting abundant sea-products and conducting salvage operations on shipwrecks.
- In 1634, during year fifth of Emperor Đức Long of Vietnam (1629–1635), the ship Grootebroek of the Dutch East India Company sank in the vicinity of the Paracel archipelago. Using a small boat, captain Huijch Jansen and 12 sailors managed to reach Đàng Trong, territory of Lord Nguyễn Phúc Nguyên (1613–1635), to seek rescue for other castaways still on the islands.
- 1680–1705, Lord Trịnh Căn of Tonkin instructed Đỗ Bá Công Đạo to publish Thiên Nam tứ chí lộ đồ (天南四至路圖), an encyclopedia consisting of four series of maps that detail routes from Thăng Long, capital of Đại Việt, to other countries in Southeast Asia. Part of this work was based on the Hồng Đức Atlas (Hồng Đức Bản Đồ) developed during the time of Emperor Lê Thánh Tông (1460–1497). This encyclopedia was considered one of the oldest and rarely preserved Vietnamese documents regarding the islands. The volume "Đường từ phủ Phụng Thiên đến Chiêm Thành" (The Route to Champa from Phụng Thiên Province), remarkably described the archipelago with maps. For instance, a statement found in the volume read "In the middle of the sea, there is a long sandbank called Bãi Cát Vàng, which is approximately 400-league long and 20-league wide rising up above the sea." Bãi Cát Vàng means Hoàng Sa, Golden Sandbank.
- In the 18th century, under instructions of the Nguyễn lords, the salvage operations officially started with the formation of Hoàng Sa and Bắc Hải Companies. Their responsibility was to carry out the mission at Hoàng Sa (Golden Sandbank) and Vạn Lý Trường Sa (Ten-thousand-league Long Sandbank) respectively. This effort was continued thereafter with successive establishments of other naval task units in accordance with strategic policies toward the two archipelagos under the Nguyễn dynasty. Noticeably, a number of naval battles between the Dutch fleet and the Nguyễn Royal Navy occurred in 1643 and 1644. The Hoàng Sa naval task unit consisted of 70 men recruited from An Vĩnh and An Hải villages of Quảng Ngãi, while the majority of members of the Bắc Hải Company came from Bình Thuận province.

===== 1700–1799 =====
- In 1776, the Phủ Biên Tạp Lục (撫邊雜錄), the Miscellaneous Records on the Pacification of the Frontiers, published by Lê Quý Đôn, a philosopher, an encyclopedist, and a Minister of Construction during the Lê dynasty (1428–1789). These six volumes detail the Nguyễn dynasty's territories, including the exploitation of the Paracel and Spratly Islands from 1702 onwards.
- 1777–1784, when traveling to Cochinchina, Father Jean-Baptiste Grosier recorded his impression about maritime activities of the Vietnamese from Huế, Đà Nẵng, and Quảng Ngãi. The abbot Grosier wrote that the people from those ports were excellent and cleverest navigators in this Kingdom. One of their activities was making long-distance sailing every year to the long chain of islands and rocks known as the Paracels to collect debris from shipwrecks.

===== 1800–1899 =====
- 1802–1820, under the reign of Emperor Gia Long, the territory of his kingdom included Tonkin, Cochin China, part of Cambodia, and "certain islands off the coast including the well known Paracels which bear such an evil reputation as a source of danger to navigation in the China Seas." In 1802, Emperor Gia Long created the "Hoàng Sa Đội" (Company of the Paracels) to supervise the island exploitation.
- In 1807, the East India Company sent Captain Daniel Ross to Cochinchina to survey the Paracel Islands. Upon arriving to the kingdom, he presented a letter of introduction entrusted by the English company to the reigning king, who was believed to be Emperor Gia Long at that time. Subsequently, Captain Ross completed chartering the south coast of China in 1807, the Paracel Islands in 1808, part of the coast of Cochin China in 1809, and the coast of Palawan in 1810. Most notably, in his surveys published in 1821 under the title "(South) China Sea, Sheet I & II", the Spratly Islands was referred to as The Dangerous Ground and was later renamed as Storm Island on the 1859 edition of the chart. Separately, in another document, the "Correct Chart of the China Sea", published by Herbert in 1758, the Paracel archipelago was described as a long group of islands and reefs extending from 13 to 17 degrees North, which approximately correspond to the geographic latitudes of the present-day Spratly and Paracel Islands, respectively. It is quite clearly that the captain himself, and probably most navigators of his time, did not differentiate the two archipelagos, but instead had delineated the present-day Spratly Islands as part of the Paracels. Captain Daniel Ross was a well known hydrographer of the Navy of Government of English Bengal and founder of the Bombay Geographical Society.
- In 1815, Emperor Gia Long ordered Phạm Quang Anh's Hoàng Sa naval task unit to sail to the islands to make surveys and report on maritime routes and draw up maps.
- In 1816, according to Jean-Baptiste Chaigneau, Emperor Gia Long officially claimed the sovereignty of the Paracel Islands, which would include the present-day Spratly archipelago. These two islands were later delineated distinctly under the reign of his successor, Emperor Minh Mạng. Chaigneau was one of the most respected advisors to Emperor Gia Long. He spent more than 30 years in Cochinchina and became the first French Consul to this kingdom in 1821.
- In 1821, the Lịch triều hiến chương loại chí (歷朝憲章類誌) published by Phan Huy Chú, a historian, an encyclopedist, and an officer of the Ministry of Construction in the time of emperor Minh Mạng. This remarkable work was prepared in 10 years (1809–1819) and consisted of 10 volumes. One of them, the Địa Dư Chí volume, details territories of Dai Nam Kingdom. In 1838, he published the Đại Nam Thống Nhất Toàn Đồ, the Unified Đại Nam Complete Map, that distinctly delineated Vạn Lý Trường Sa (the Ten-thousand-league Long Sandbank) and Hoàng Sa (the Golden Sandbank).
- In 1827, a world atlas produced by Belgian geographer Philippe Vandermaelen was published in Belgium. Vietnam was described by four maps in this atlas. One of these maps has the title "Partie de la Cochinchine", in which Paracel Islands was included, indicating that it was part of Cochinchine (southern Vietnam region). The map also featured geography, politics, minerals and statistics about the Empire of An Nam (former name of Vietnam). Moreover, the map titled "Partie de la Chine" in the atlas had identified Hainan Island as the southernmost point of China at that time.
- In 1833, Emperor Minh Mạng ordered the Ministry of Construction to build a temple, erect steles, and plant many trees on the islands for navigation purposes.
- In 1834, Emperor Minh Mạng ordered Trương Phúc Sĩ, a naval task unit commander, accompanied by 21 men sailing to the islands to survey and draw map of Hoàng Sa.
- In 1835, Emperor Minh Mạng issued a royal ordinance to order 24 troops to the Paracel Islands. Generations of the Đặng family have preserved the royal ordinance and publicly disclosed it in early 2009.
- In 1835, the King ordered Phạm Văn Nguyên's naval task unit, accompanied by workers from Bình Định and Quãng Ngãi provinces, to build Hoàng Sa temple with a wind screen and erect steles on Bàn Than Thạch (Bàn Than Rock) of the present-day Woody Island. The mission was completed in 10 days. Notably, about 33m southwest from the erection, there was a little ancient temple where a stele engraved with the words "Vạn Lý Ba Bình" found. This inscription means Ten Thousand Leagues of Calming Waves. The date of the actual erection of the ancient temple remains unknown
- In 1836, Emperor Minh Mạng received a report from his Ministry of Construction that recommended a comprehensive survey of all the East Sea islands because of their "great strategic importance to our maritime borders." The King ordered Phạm Hữu Nhật, a royal navy commander, to erect a wooden stele on the islands. The post was engraved with the following inscription: The 17th of the reign of Minh Mạng by the royal ordinance commander of the navy Phạm Hữu Nhật came here to Hoàng Sa for reconnaissance to make topographical measurements and leave this stele as record thereof.
- In 1838, Bishop Jean-Louis Taberd published the "Latin-Annamese Dictionary". The dictionary contains the "An Nam Đại Quốc Họa Đồ" (The Great Annam Map). In the neighborhood of the present-day coordinate of the islands, words found on the map read "Paracel seu Cát Vàng" (Paracel or Cát Vàng). Cát Vàng means Hoàng Sa, Golden Sands or Golden Sandbank.
- In 1842, Hai Lu Do Chi, a historical Chinese document was written in the 22nd year of the reign of the Daoguang Emperor (1820–1850) of the Qing dynasty (1644 to 1912) of China. A statement found in this book read: Wang Li Shi Tang (万里石塘) is a sandbank rising above the sea. Several thousand leagues in length, it forms a rampart on the periphery of the Kingdom of Annam. Wang Li Shi Tang means Ten-thousand-league Long Sandbank.
- In 1858, Napoleon III ordered French troops to attack Tourane, the present-day Đà Nẳng city. Subsequently, France launched more attacks and forced Cochin China and some provinces in the South to become her colonies. French Indochina was formed in 1887 and consisted of Tonkin, Annam, Cochin China, and Cambodia.
- The 1887 Chinese-Vietnamese Boundary Convention signed between France and China after the Sino-French War, which, according to China, put the islands in the Chinese territory. In fact, the treaty only clarified Gulf of Tonkin sea border and other land border issues between Vietnam and China.
- 1895–1896, German vessel Bellona and Japanese ship Himeji Maru sank at the islands. Chinese fishermen looted and resold them at Hainan. These countries protested but local Chinese authorities, the Governor of Liang Guang, denied any responsibilities on the ground that the Paracels were abandoned and belonged to neither country.
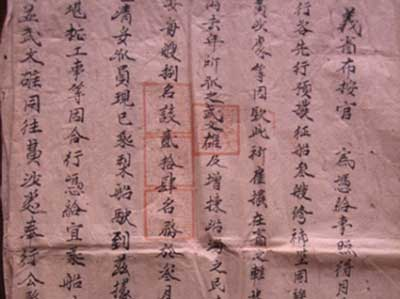
The Royal Ordinance issued by Emperor Minh Mạng, 1835

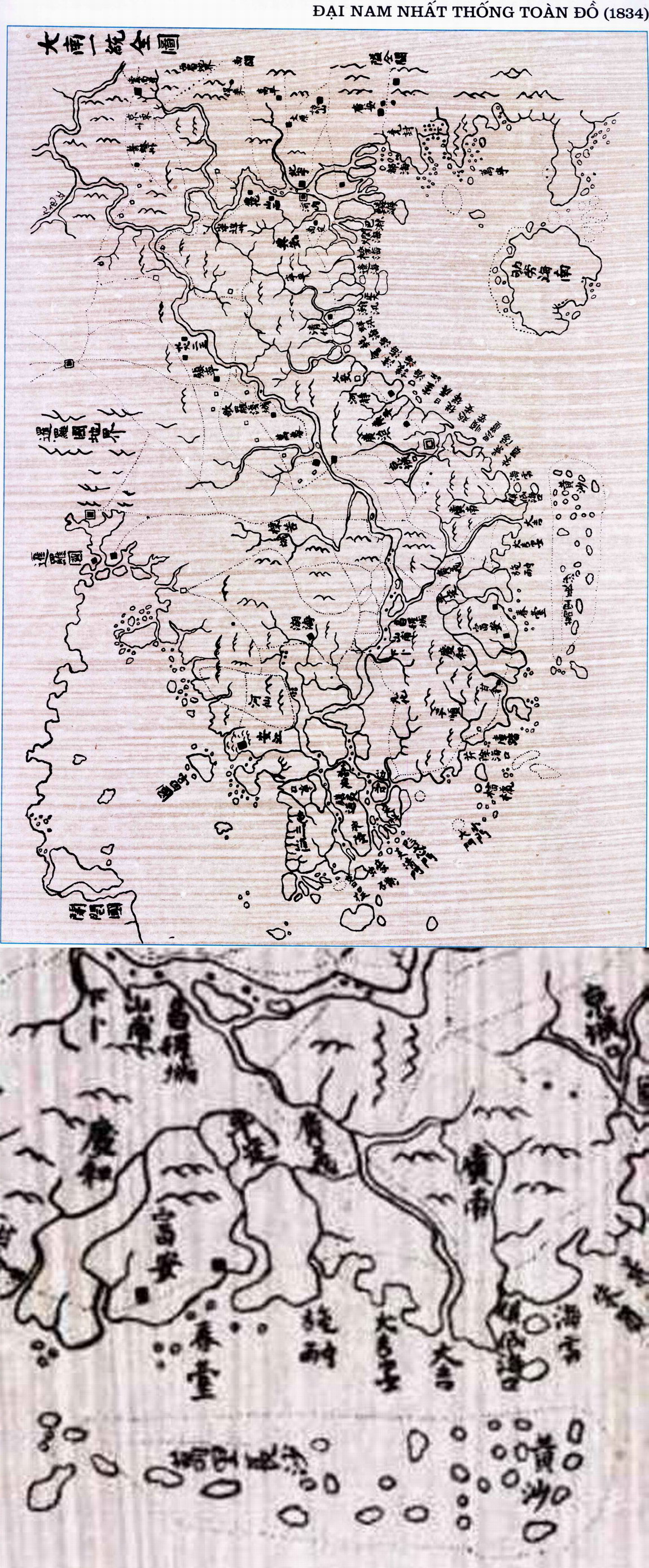
Đại Nam Thống Nhất Toàn Đồ—The Unified Đại Nam Complete Map (1838)—distinctly delineated Hoàng Sa and Vạn Lý Trường Sa at the far right margin

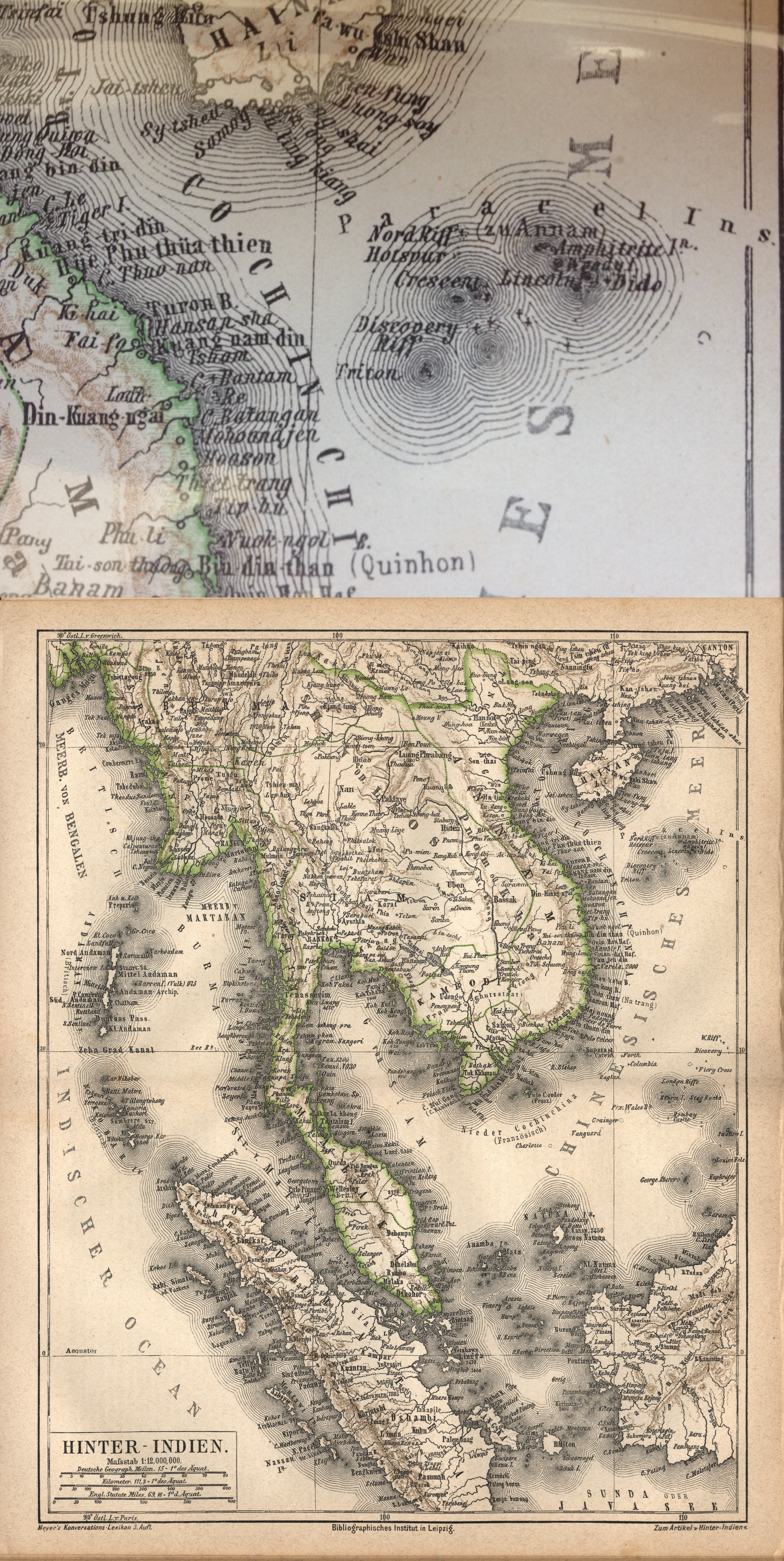
1880 German map of Southeast Asia, locating the Paracel Islands as part of "Annam" (Vietnam)

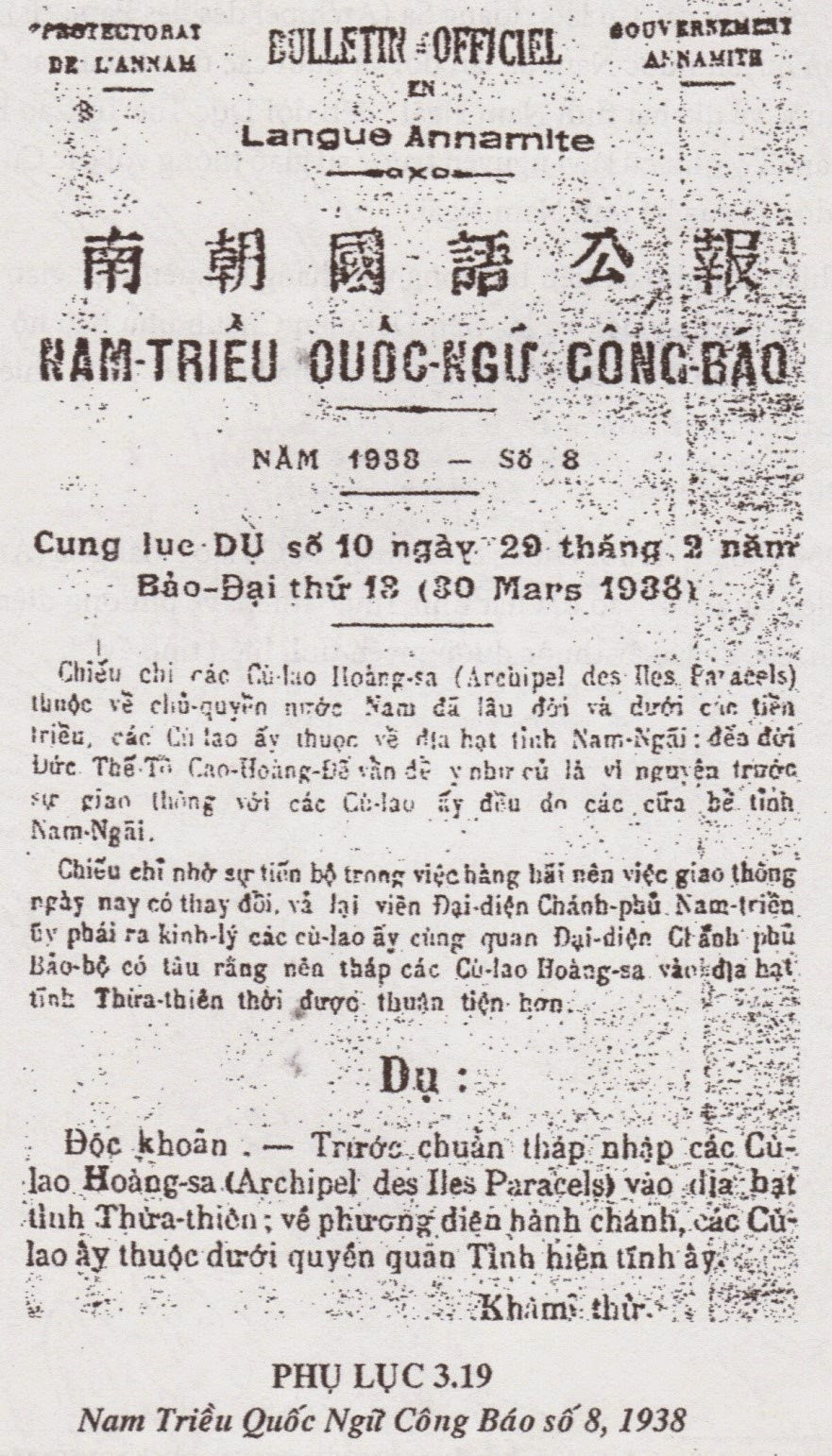
Imperial edict no. 10 of 29-02-Bảo Đại 13 (30 March 1938) transferring the Paracels from the Quảng Ngãi province to the Thừa Thiên province issued by the Bảo Đại Emperor as recorded in the Nam-Triều Quốc-Ngữ Công-Báo (南朝國語公報, "Bulletin of the Southern dynasty in the National Language") số 8 (1938). Referring to the islands as "sovereign" (chủ-quyền) territory of the South (nước Nam) since "long ago and under previous dynasties" (đã lâu đời và dưới các tiền triều).

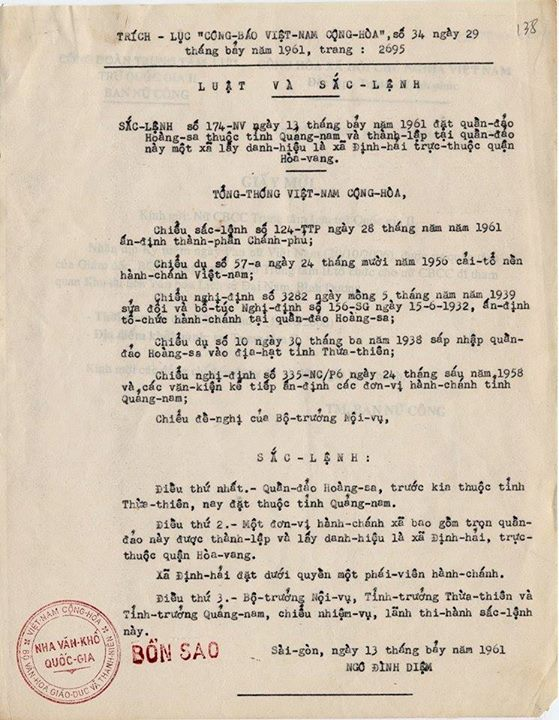
Decree no.174-NV from the presidency of Ngô Đình Diệm, Republic of Vietnam, redistricting the Paracels as part of Quảng Nam Province effective 13 July 1961. The Paracels were previously part of Thừa Thiên–Huế Province since 30 March 1938, when redistricted by the government of French Indochina.

==== 20th-century events ====
- In the 1910-20s, the French Ministry of Colonies and the Ministry of Foreign Affairs agreed that the Paracel Islands were under Chinese sovereignty, and that France should not try to claim them, either on behalf of itself, or Annam. Therefore, France did not protest in 1921 when the government of Guangdong province declared the Paracels to be under the administration of Hainan Island. 5 years later in 1926, France refused an application from a French company to exploit guano in the Paracels. It also refused a similar application from a Japanese company.
- In 1932, France nonetheless formally claimed both the Paracel and Spratly Islands. China and Japan both protested. On 6 April 1933, France occupied the Spratlys, announced their annexation, formally included them in French Indochina, and built a couple of weather stations on them.
- On 3 July 1938, French Indochinese colonial troops, headed by sub-lieutenant Edmond Grethen, occupy the Paracels islands in turn.
- In March 1939 Japan took the islands from France, garrisoned them, and built a submarine base at Itu Aba (now Taiping / 太平) Island. In 1941, the Japanese Empire made the Paracel and Spratly islands part of Taiwan, then under its rule.
- After World War II, Nationalist China reaffirmed its sovereignty over the islands in the South China Sea, and dispatched a patrol force to the islands, but this was challenged by the French.
- After the fall of the nationalist regime in China in 1949, the PRC gained control of the eastern half of the Paracel islands. Several small clashes occurred between the French and the communist Chinese naval forces during this period, but eventually a de facto line of control was established with the PRC occupying Woody Island, while the remainder was held by Franco -Vietnamese forces.
- In 1951, at the international Treaty of San Francisco conference, Vietnam's representative claimed that both the Paracels and Spratlys are territories of Vietnam, and was met with no challenge from all nations at the event. However, neither the PRC nor the ROC participated in the conference. Separately, the ROC negotiated and signed its own treaty with Japan regarding the islands on April 29, 1952.
- In 1954, according to the Geneva Agreements, which were signed by a number of nations including the PRC, Vietnam was partitioned into two states, North Vietnam and South Vietnam. The 17th parallel was used as the provisional military demarcation line, which was effectively extended into the territorial waters. The Paracel archipelago lies south of this line and belongs to South Vietnam accordingly.
- In 1956, after the French withdrawal from Vietnam, South Vietnam replaced French control of the islands. By February 1956, the South Vietnamese Navy was already stationed on Pattle Island by Ngô Đình Diệm, though both the PRC and ROC politically and diplomatically condemned the decision and reaffirmed their claims to the islands. Following on the former French claim, Vietnam claimed the entire Paracel Islands.
- On September 4, 1958, the government of the PRC proclaimed the breadth of its territorial sea to be twelve nautical miles (22 km) which applied to all its territory, including the Paracel and Spratly Islands. Ten days later, the prime minister of North Vietnam, Phạm Văn Đồng, in his letter to Zhou Enlai stated that his government had respected the declaration of the PRC government. The PRC government used this letter as justification for their occupation, in fact, according to PhD Nguyen Van Canh: "The note of a prime minister, that is, the executive, is just an administrative document in the field of diplomacy, and in the matter of territorial transfers, the constitutions of countries stipulate that there must be a treaty regulating the transfer of territory and determine that problem. In other words, the National Assembly decides on that issue, and the National Assembly reflects the will of the entire people when transferring territory."
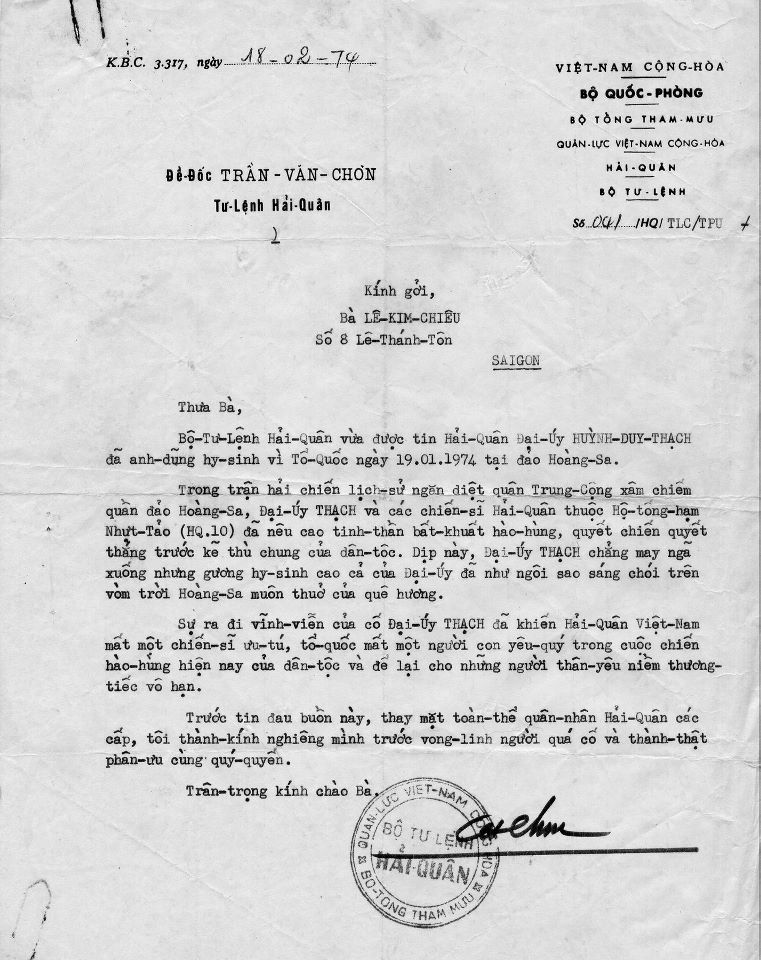
- Letter from South Vietnam's General Staff of the Republic of Vietnam Military Forces, dated 18 February 1974, concerning the Battle of the Paracel Islands
  On January 19, 1974, the Battle of the Paracel Islands between the PRC and South Vietnam took place, leaving the PRC in control of the entire archipelago. On January 16, South Vietnamese naval officers and an American observer had reported to Saigon some suspected military activities of the Chinese navy on the Drummond and Duncan islands. After receiving the report, the government of South Vietnam decided to counter the Chinese forces, to defend the South Vietnamese-controlled section (the western half of the Paracels) from Chinese occupation, and sent a unit of frigates to the area. On January 19, there were sea and land battles between the Chinese and Vietnamese forces with casualties on both sides. At the end, the Chinese fleet defeated the naval force of South Vietnam. With the ongoing civil war with the Viet Cong embroiling South Vietnam's attention and the absence of the USA's support, no military attempt was made to re-engage the PRC over the islands. After the military engagement and the subsequent victory, the PRC gained control of the entire archipelago and has maintained control since. It was a significant turning point for the PRC but the sovereignty dispute on the islands remains unresolved with Vietnam.
- In 1982, Vietnam established Hoang Sa District in Quang Nam-Da Nang covering these islands.
- In a statement released on 13 July 1999 by the foreign ministry of Taiwan, under President Lee Teng-hui stated that "legally, historically, geographically, or in reality", all of the South China Sea and the islands were Taiwan's territory and under Taiwanese sovereignty. The ROC's and the PRC's claims "mirror" each other. Taiwan and China are largely strategically aligned on the islands issue, since they both claim exactly the same area, so Taiwan's claims are viewed as an extension of China's claims. Taiwan and China both claim the entire island chains, while all the other claimants only claim portions of them, and China has proposed cooperation with Taiwan against all the other countries claiming the islands, such as Vietnam. China has urged Taiwan to cooperate and offered Taiwan a share in oil and gas resources while shutting out all the other rival claimants. Board director Chiu Yi of Taiwan's state run oil company, CPC Corp, has named Vietnam as the "greatest threat" to Taiwan. The United States has regularly ignored Taiwan's claims in the South China Sea and does not include Taiwan in any talks on dispute resolution for the area.

==== 21st-century events ====
- In July 2012 the National Assembly of Vietnam passed a law demarcating Vietnamese sea borders to include the Paracel and Spratly Islands.

The Philippines and Vietnam promptly lodged diplomatic protests strongly opposing the establishment of the Sansha City under Chinese jurisdiction.

- In April 2013, a representative from the Vietnamese Foreign Ministry's National Boundary Commission gave a diplomatic note to a representative of the Chinese Embassy in Hanoi demanding that China cancel its plan to bring tourists to the Paracel archipelago.

According to reports from Chinese state media, at the beginning of May 2014, Chinese and Vietnamese naval vessels collided near the islands as Hanoi sought to prevent a Chinese oil rig from setting up in the area. On May 26, a Vietnamese fishing boat sank near the oil rig, after colliding with a Chinese vessel. As both sides imputed the blame to each other, Vietnam released a video footage in a week later, showing a Chinese vessel ramming into its ship before it sank; the Chinese said they were on the defensive while Vietnamese vessels were attacking the Chinese fishing boats.

- On May 9, 2014, Taiwan reiterated its claim to the Paracel islands, rejecting all rival claims amidst the standoff and repeating its position that all of the Paracel Islands, Spratly Islands, Macclesfield Bank and Pratas Islands belong to the Republic of China along with "their surrounding waters and respective seabed and subsoil", and that Taiwan views both Vietnam and mainland China's claims as illegitimate. This statement was released by Taiwan's Ministry of Foreign Affairs, which added – "There is no doubt that the Republic of China has sovereignty over the archipelagos and waters."
- In January 2016, photographs emerged that indicate that China is reclaiming land and expanding military facilities in the Paracels, including at Duncan Island, North Island, and Tree Island. Commentators have likened this work to the initial stages of China's large-scale construction in the Spratly Islands.
- On July 12, 2016, an arbitration under the United Nations Convention on the Law of the Sea (UNCLOS) backed the Philippines against China's claims of resources and maritime areas within the nine-dash line that exceeded its entitlements under the UNCLOS. The tribunal argued that China had not historically exercised exclusive control within, hence has "no legal basis" to claim "historic rights" over resources. The ruling was rejected by both China and Taiwan.
- In February 2017, the AMTI project under the Center for Strategic and International Studies reported that Chinese authorities had carried out land reclamation on 20 reefs, thus establishing 20 Chinese outposts so far. These include Duncan Island and Drummond Island which also have small helipads. Of these, three were capable of berthing small naval and commercial merchant ships. Vietnam had responded to this by expanding its already existing facilities on some of the Spratly islands occupied by it.
- In 2026, China began construction at Antelope Reef in the Paracel Islands, expanding infrastructure that could have military and civilian uses. The development and the country's increased defense spending drew attention for the scale involved, with observers noting its potential for sustained maritime operations and impacts on regional territorial claims. This resumption followed a decade of slowdown in its island-building activities.

== In popular culture ==
- The film Storm in the South China Sea (南海风云) was produced in China in 1976, showing the Battle of the Paracel Islands in 1974.
- Battlefield 4, a 2013 first-person shooter video game, includes a map based on the Paracel Islands, titled "Paracel Storm".
- The television show "The Last Ship" features the crew of the USS Nathan James navigating a minefield through the islands as part of an operation to rescue some of their crew mates that had been taken captive by pirates and were being held hostage on one of the islands.

== See also ==
- Great Wall of Sand
- Island chain strategy
- Nine-dash line
- Spratly Islands
- Territorial disputes in the South China Sea
