= Amherst Embassy =

1816 British diplomatic mission to Qing China led by Lord Amherst

The Amherst Embassy (Chinese: 阿美士德使团) was the second British mission sent to China after the Macartney Embassy, led by Lord Amherst. The immediate reason for dispatching the embassy was to resolve the trade dispute caused by the Doris incident, while its broader purpose was to improve Sino-British relations and promote British trading interests in China by seeking an audience with the Jiaqing Emperor. The embassy departed in February 1816, arrived in Guangdong in early July and joined the British East India Company Guangzhou factory, and reached Tianjin in early August. Because the Amherst Embassy still upheld the principle of diplomatic reciprocity of the Macartney Embassy, it refused from beginning to end to perform the full 'three kneelings and nine kowtows ceremony' before the emperor. This led to several days of disputes with Qing court and officials. As a result, on the day it arrived in Beijing, 29 August, the embassy was sent back by Jiaqing; after the embassy left, Jiaqing further issued an edict requiring Britain to "henceforth not send envoys from afar, which only causes unnecessary travel and hardship."

Accompanied by Qing official Guanghui, the embassy traveled southward roughly along the route of Macartney's time through China's interior to Guangzhou. What was seen and heard en route further led the British to recognize the decline in Qing national power. If the Macartney Embassy was unsuccessful, then the Amherst Embassy, despatched 22 years later, was more fruitless than the former, so was often neglected as a significant event from this period. The Jiaqing court and officials became more vigilant afterward toward British schemes, but their understanding of British national strength and conditions remained limited, still using trade as leverage in policy toward Britain. After experiencing the successive failures of the Macartney Embassy and the Amherst Embassy, Britain more deeply recognized the current situation of Qing society and economy, and that relations with China could no longer be changed through diplomatic channels. Therefore, it no longer blindly complied with the various restrictions set by the Qing, and leaned more toward using force to safeguard its own trading interests. This also laid the groundwork for the later Opium War.

== Background ==
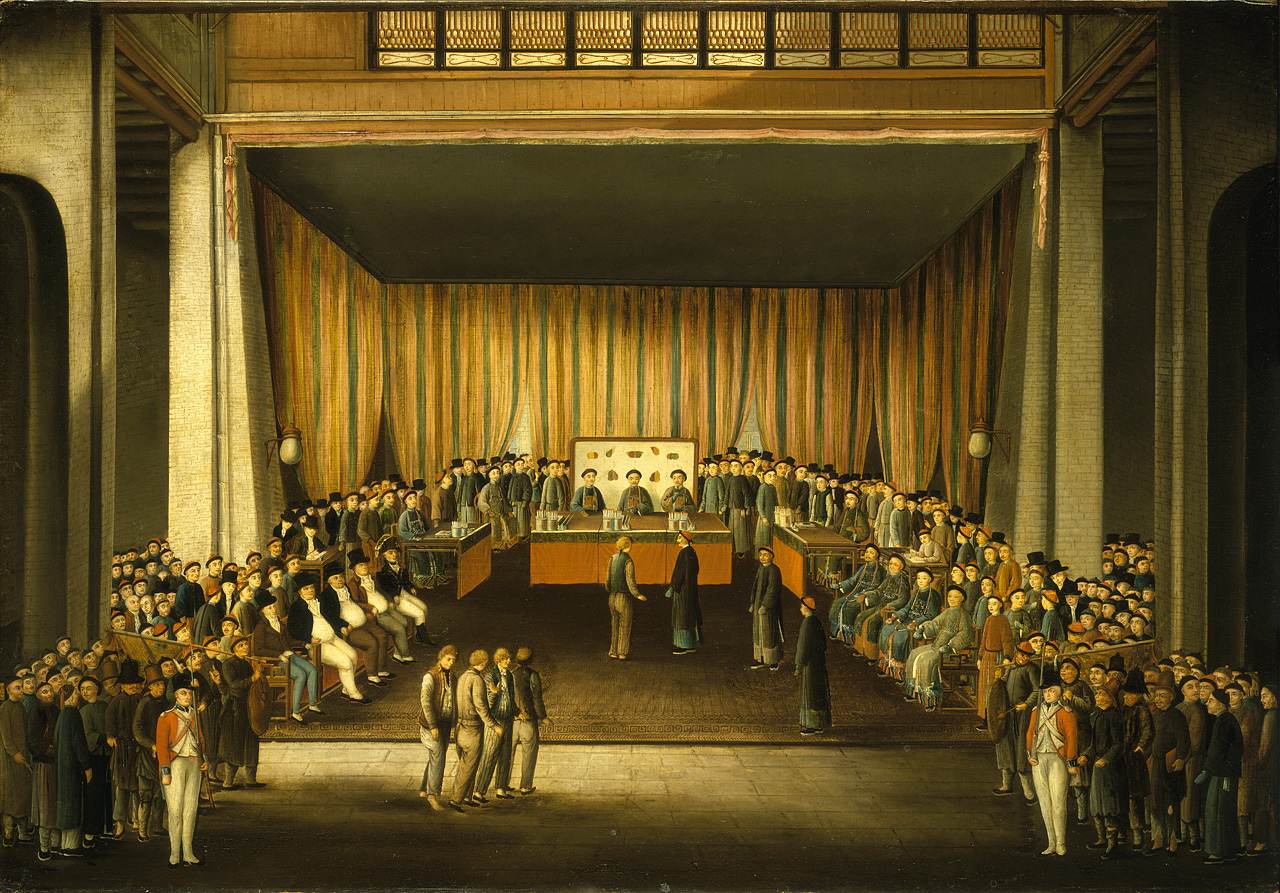
In 1807, British and Chinese sides jointly tried Edward Sheen, an East India Company sailor from the Neptune, for killing a Chinese person at the company's trading post in Guangzhou.

=== Qing national power and foreign trade ===
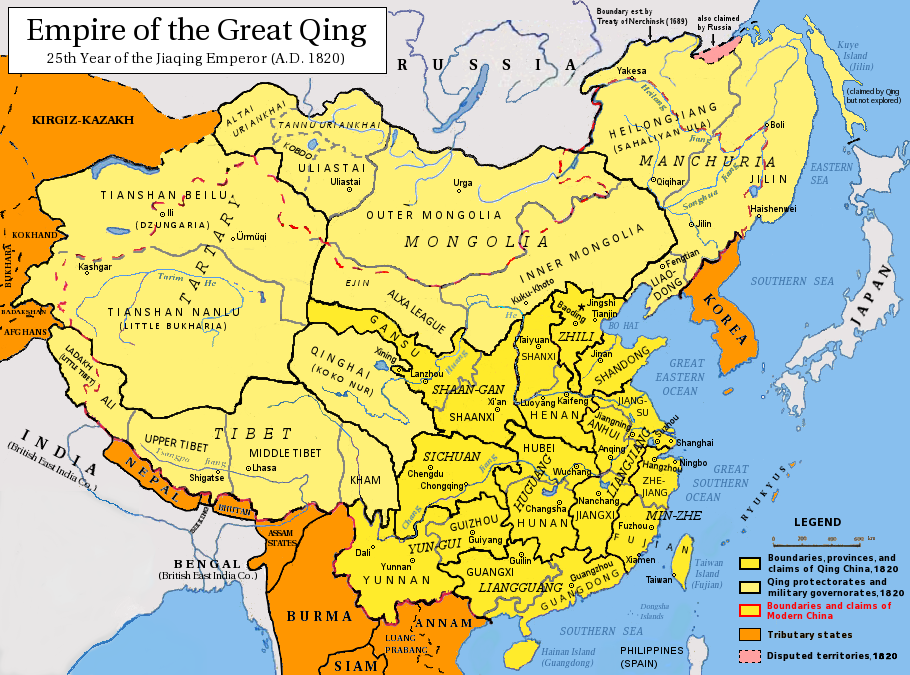
Map of the Qing dynasty and surrounding regions during the Jiaqing era

Qing national power turned from prosperity to decline in the later Qianlong reign. Ordinary people generally faced poverty and hunger; the decline in people's livelihood further led to social unrest, with popular uprisings occurring one after another, and finances also becoming unsustainable. However, from the mid-to-late Qianlong period, the entire ruling class, driven by the emperor himself, began to shift from frugality to extravagance. Officials headed by Heshen engaged in rampant corruption, vigorously pursuing material enjoyment while being conservative and unenterprising in national politics, ignoring the increasingly severe social crisis. The succeeding Jiaqing, as a "ruler preserving the achievements," although he exhausted every means to clean up officialdom, still could not reverse the situation of gradually declining national power and an emptying treasury. Officials often complied in public but opposed in private or perfunctorily handled court orders. Lower-level clerks, with the indulgence of superiors and driven by interests, acted lawlessly and wantonly.

At the same time, Western powers were also gradually eroding the Qing's external environment: Russia had already invaded Manchuria and was expanding in Central Asia, and in 1806 (Jiaqing 11) even sent troops to invade Sakhalin; the British East India Company controlled vast areas of India in 1763 and further expanded toward China's borders, controlling Nepal by 1816 and then coveting Tibet—as external tributaries were successively pruned away, the former tributary system in which all nations came to court gradually became deserted, and the Qing itself was also in peril. However, the Jiaqing court's understanding of the world situation and its own diplomatic environment still remained at the level of the Qianlong period, still holding a Celestial Empire mentality and believing that Britain was merely a remote small country prospering through the tea trade. At the same time, after experiencing the failure of the 1793 Macartney visit to China, Britain's attitude toward China quietly changed—Macartney himself claimed: "The Qing Empire is like a dilapidated first-rate warship. It has not sunk in the past one hundred and fifty years only due to the support of a succession of fortunate, capable, and vigilant officers, and it surpasses other neighboring ships only in its size and appearance. But once an incompetent person takes command on deck, there will no longer be discipline or safety."

Specifically in Guangzhou under the single port trading system, officials of the Guangdong Customs imposed excessive and arbitrary levies and demands. Despite repeated prohibitions from the Qing court, they brazenly extorted and demanded customary bribes from foreign merchants and Hong merchants: foreign merchants, according to the system at the time, could only communicate with Guangzhou authorities through Hong merchants; even when encountering obvious injustices in trade or law enforcement, they had nowhere to appeal; there were not a few cases of Hong merchants going bankrupt due to official extortion, so merchants resisted joining the Thirteen Factories, and the decreasing number of Hong merchants made the Thirteen Factories system increasingly unable to cope with the growing Sino-foreign trade. On the other hand, the sharp increase in Sino-British tea trade caused large outflows of British silver to China. To compensate for losses, the East India Company allowed its sailors and supercargoes to collude with private merchants in smuggling opium to China, and more and more merchants bypassed the monopoly privileges of the East India Company and the Thirteen Factories to engage in illegal trade. In this context, the East India Company used its legal status in China to cover the private merchants' opium trade, and contradictions with Guangzhou authorities also deepened daily, with constant friction between the two sides over trade and legal issues.

=== Macartney Embassy ===
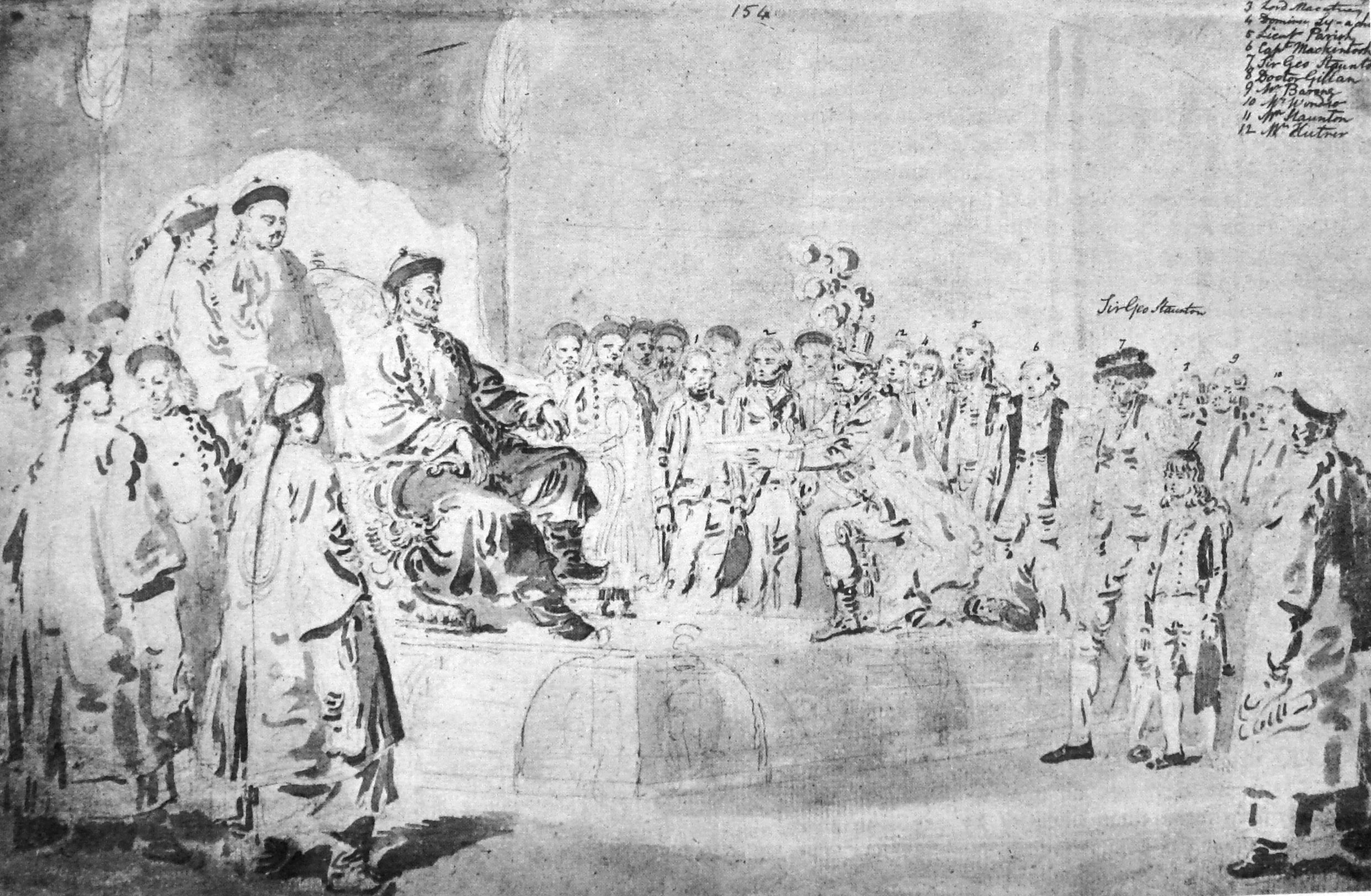
Macartney performs a one-knee kneel before Qianlong in the presence of others, drawn by accompanying painter William Alexander.

In 1792, Britain sent the Macartney Embassy to visit China. Although the embassy was nominally for congratulating Qianlong on his birthday, its actual mission was to expand Sino-British trade. Although both Chinese and British sides held different views on ceremonial issues, and even had differing accounts of the etiquette Macartney used when meeting Qianlong, the embassy ultimately gained the opportunity for an audience: in addition to the collective audience for tributaries, Qianlong separately met with Macartney and the Staunton father and son. After Macartney's audience, Heshen arranged for Qianlong to converse with the only Englishman in the embassy who could speak Chinese, young Staunton, and young Staunton also received a purse as a gift from Qianlong. However, Qianlong rejected all the requests proposed by Macartney and became wary of Britain, "precautions must be taken in advance." All the embassy's hopes of expanding trade through the audience came to nothing.

After the Macartney Embassy returned home, discussions about its failure were intense. Because Europe was then in the midst of China fever, many people still believed the descriptions of Chinese superiority by Enlightenment thinkers, and many people, out of national pride in the British Empire, suspected that the British had been insulted in China. Therefore, under public opinion pressure, the embassy had to write An Authentic Account of an Embassy from the King of Great Britain to the Emperor of China to calm public opinion. As these materials were successively published, more and more people learned about China's actual situation. For example, after reading the Jesuit letters and An Authentic Account of an Embassy from the King of Great Britain to the Emperor of China, Hegel evaluated China as "nothing but a magnificent ruin... no progress can be achieved there." China's image in Europe changed from an admirable ideal state to a "semi-barbaric" country that needed lessons.

Old Staunton, who visited as deputy envoy, originally hoped to stay in Beijing as a permanent envoy after the visit but had to return disappointed.; subsequently, in 1796 when Qianlong abdicated, he invited Britain to send an envoy to visit China, but old Staunton was unable to participate due to illness. Young Staunton was also influenced by his father old Staunton and teacher John Barrow, and aspired to the unfinished cause of his elders. After dropping out of Trinity College, Cambridge at University of Cambridge, he obtained a position in the East India Company Guangzhou factory in 1798 through nepotism, becoming the youngest employee in the factory at only 19 years old. During his service in Guangzhou, young Staunton devoted himself to studying Chinese language and culture, spending 10 years from 1800 translating the *Great Qing Legal Code*, becoming a well-known China Hands, but the envoy plans he proposed in 1800 and 1810 were both rejected by the company's senior management.

=== Continued deterioration of Sino-British relations ===
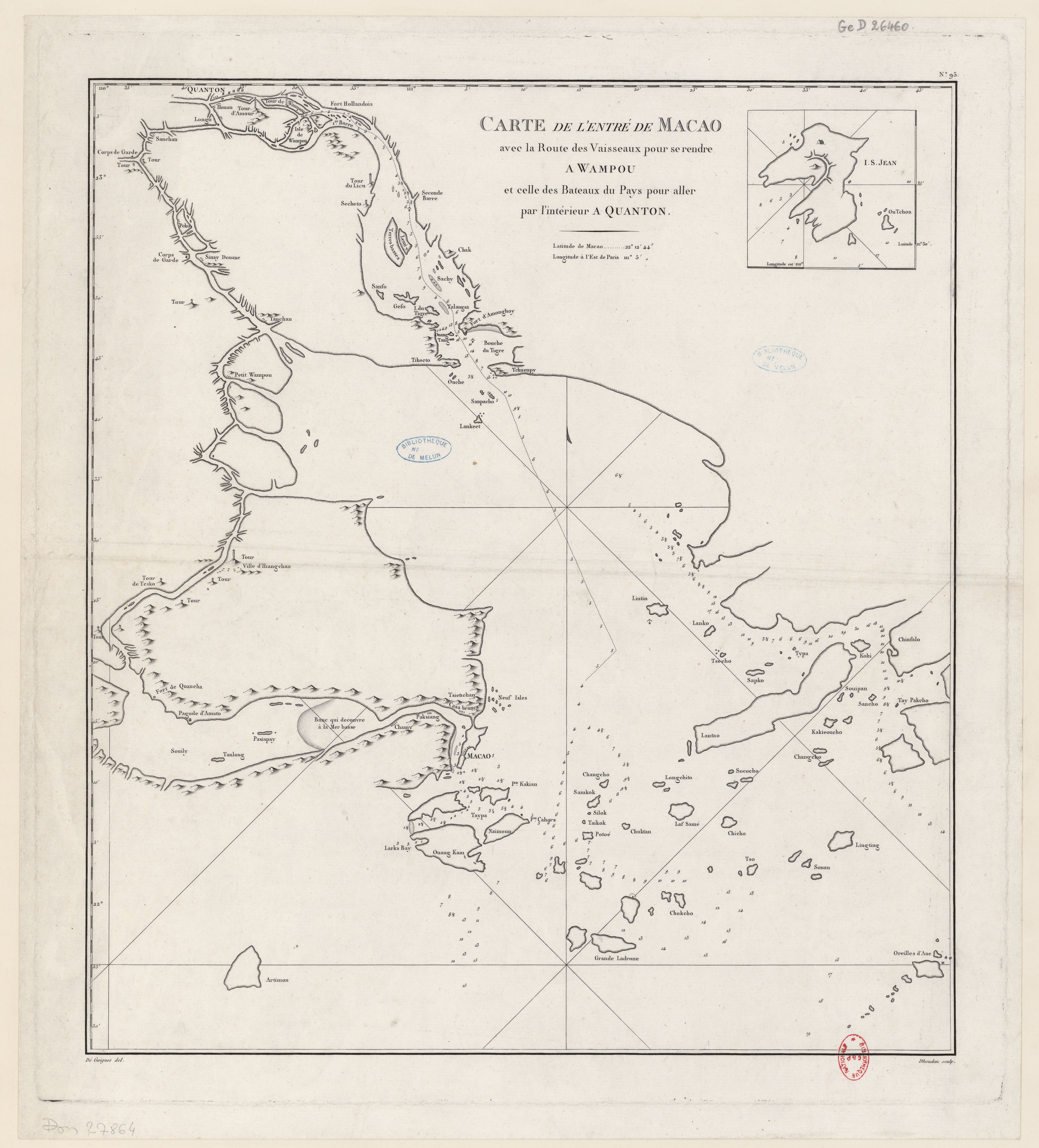
Map of Macau and the Pearl River estuary channels drawn by Frenchman Chrétien-Louis-Joseph de Guignes in 1808

After the Industrial Revolution, British national power increased day by day, attempting to expand its trading interests in the East through colonial expansion. After the failure of the Macartney Embassy, Britain shelved plans to send another embassy due to the Napoleonic Wars, turning its attention to ally Portugal's Macau, and sent troops twice in 1802 and 1808 in attempts to occupy Macau, but both failed. In 1802, when Britain first attempted to occupy Macau, Portuguese missionaries José Bernardo de Almeida and Alexandre de Gouveia, serving in Beijing's Imperial Astronomical Bureau, memorialized Jiaqing, requesting the Chinese government to pay attention to the matter. The two pointed out that the Macartney Embassy's ambitions were not limited to increasing trading ports but also hoped to obtain islands along China's coast as residences, and that Britain began with leased land to gradually encroach, ultimately annexing Bengal Subah in 1798. However, Jiaqing referred what the two said to officials for verification, and Qing court officials determined the matter was a rumor. In 1808, British troops took advantage of Portugal's homeland falling to send troops to Macau again. Macau authorities refused British troops entry into the city and sought help from the Qing. The British not only ignored Chinese warnings but took over Macau and dispatched a fleet to Guangzhou. The British actions greatly angered Jiaqing, who ordered a blockade of Macau traffic and suspension of Sino-British trade. This led Britain to have to abandon the occupation of Macau, withdraw troops at the end of the year, and the East India Company Guangzhou factory also assured the Chinese government that British warships would no longer come to China. Afterward, Sino-British trade was restored.

After the friction over Macau ended, Sino-British relations not only did not ease but further deteriorated due to a series of events. The first was the Huang Yasheng case in 1810. The authorities, without knowing the exact perpetrator, demanded the East India Company hand over the murderer and execute the involved sailors, and also prohibited ships belonging to the East India Company from sailing. This not only forced the company Guangzhou factory's supercargo Roberts (Note: John William Roberts/João Guilherme Robarts, whose surname was changed from Robert to Robart when registered by the Portuguese Macau authorities.) to leave Guangzhou, but also resulted in two Hong merchants being sentenced to exile. By 1813, Guangzhou authorities refused to allow Roberts, who had previously returned home to "arrest the murderer," to return to Guangzhou, which triggered strong dissatisfaction among the British. Subsequently, in 1814, the British Royal Navy's HMS Doris came to China's coastal waters, using Macau as a base to enforce the trade blockade against the United States, attempting to prevent American merchant ships from entering Guangzhou. On 18 March 1814, Doris captured the American merchant ship Hunter near Macau waters and on 8 May, it dispatched a tender deep into the Humen Strait (Note: The contemporary name Bogue was a corruption of Portuguese Boca do Tigre (literally “Mouth of the Tiger”), a calque of the Chinese name 虎門 / 虎门 (Hǔmén, literally “Tiger Gate”).), pursuing American merchant ships fleeing to Guangzhou on the Pearl River near Pazhou anchorage. The British continuous blockade at the Pearl River Estuary, and the behavior of attacking and plundering American merchant ships in Chinese jurisdictional waters in disregard of Chinese law, undoubtedly angered Guangzhou authorities. Guangzhou authorities ordered the East India Company, under threat of suspending trade, to instruct the British navy to withdraw from Guangdong waters, but the East India Company refused on the grounds that the navy was not under its jurisdiction, so both sides were deadlocked. Previously, the East India Company had commissioned translator A Yao to carry gifts to visit Songyun, who had previously hosted the Macartney Embassy visit to China, was then a Grand Council member, and later served as Viceroy of Liangguang. Songyun reported the matter to Jiaqing. After A Yao returned to Guangzhou, he was arrested by authorities on 4 October.

Afterward, the East India Company Guangzhou factory announced the voluntary suspension of Sino-British trade, withdrew foreign merchants from Guangzhou, and appointed George Thomas Staunton as representative to demand negotiations; if refused, they would go north to "appeal grievances" to the emperor. Guangzhou authorities had already met most of the British demands in October, but young Staunton refused to give up on the matter of releasing A Yao, intentionally using it as a bargaining chip to change the way of Sino-British interactions. Negotiations were once interrupted because of this, and ultimately both sides reached a compromise by the end of 1814. Although Guangzhou authorities promulgated new trade regulations favorable to British merchants, the pressure felt by foreign merchants in Guangzhou did not decrease, and young Staunton, as the negotiation representative who could "command" foreign merchants to defy the court, was hated by Guangzhou authorities and the court. Limited by communication conditions at the time, as late as October 1815, London's The Times was still reporting the suspension of Sino-British trade, which also led senior management of the East India Company in London to seriously consider the possibility of dispatching an embassy.

== Proposal and preparation ==
=== Proposal for sending the envoy ===
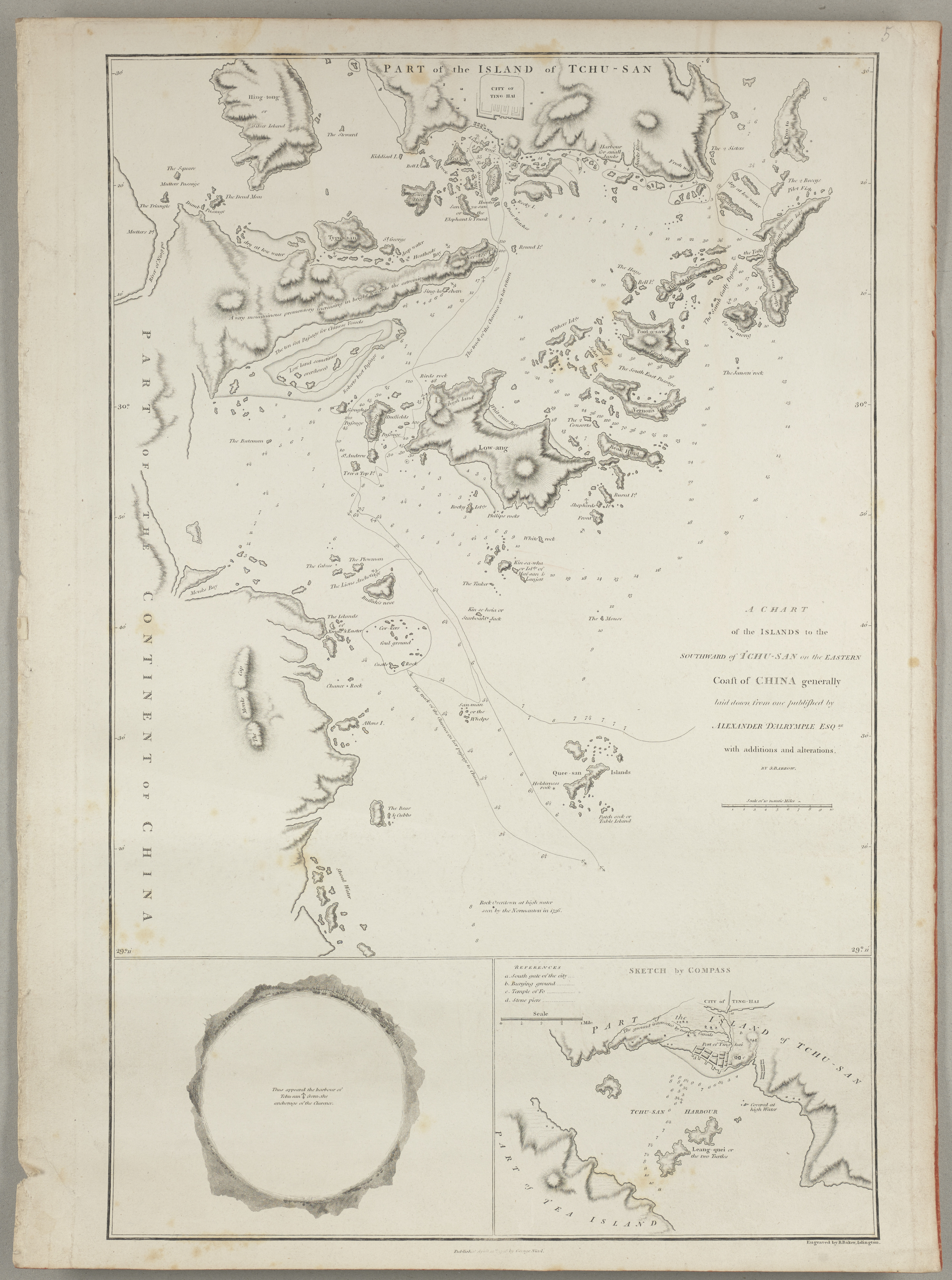
Map of the Zhoushan Archipelago drawn by John Barrow

As early as after the British occupation of Macau in 1808, young Staunton proposed sending an embassy to ease relations, and his teacher—John Barrow, who served in the British Admiralty—fully supported young Staunton's plan within the British government. However, compared to the British government, the East India Company, which was directly responsible for dealings with China, took a relatively cautious attitude toward sending an embassy. Ultimately, it was under internal British government impetus that the Amherst Embassy was able to proceed.

With Napoleon's abdication in 1814 and Europe restoring peace again, many countries intended to join trade with China. The potential competitive pressure led John Barrow to write on 14 February 1815 to the chairman of the Board of Control, Earl of Buckinghamshire, who was responsible for supervising the East India Company within the British government, lobbying him to support sending an embassy. In his view, after Europe restored peace, the French would pose a threat to British trade in China, because at that time many French Jesuit missionaries worked in the Beijing court and could serve as liaisons between the French and Chinese courts. On the other hand, the vast Chinese interior would provide a huge market for British industrial goods after the Industrial Revolution. On 3 March 1815, the East India Company's highest decision-making body—the Secret Committee of the Court of Directors—held a meeting in London to discuss this issue and recognized its potential value, therefore proposing to form an embassy consisting of a chief envoy appointed by the Prince Regent and two staff members from the company's Guangzhou factory. Subsequently, the Earl of Buckinghamshire and the East India Company's chairman and deputy chairman together visited the then British Prime Minister Earl of Liverpool, but the Earl of Liverpool worried that a failure similar to the Macartney Embassy would have an adverse impact on his support, so he showed little interest, causing the plan to send an envoy to be temporarily shelved.

On 7 July 1815, London received a letter sent from Guangzhou on 16 January, stating that the situation in Guangzhou was not optimistic and requesting the British government to send an embassy to Beijing—this provided sufficient reason for the mission plan, and London also took action again. The Earl of Buckinghamshire wrote to the East India Company board on 26 July proposing to send an embassy, while the East India Company replied on 28 July reporting the situation in Guangzhou and the negotiation demands drafted by the East India Company—on the same day, East India senior management wrote to the British government requesting to send an embassy—the Earl of Buckinghamshire and East India Company senior management both believed that Guangzhou authorities were attempting to control their factory in Guangzhou, while the emperor himself was far away in Beijing and misled by local authorities. Only by sending an embassy to Beijing in the name of the British monarch to have an audience with the emperor and directly state the grievances could the company's trade and staff be protected, and the East India Company was willing to bear all the costs of sending the envoy. Ultimately, the Liverpool cabinet approved the East India Company's plan to send an envoy on 10 August 1815.

=== Selection of the special envoy ===
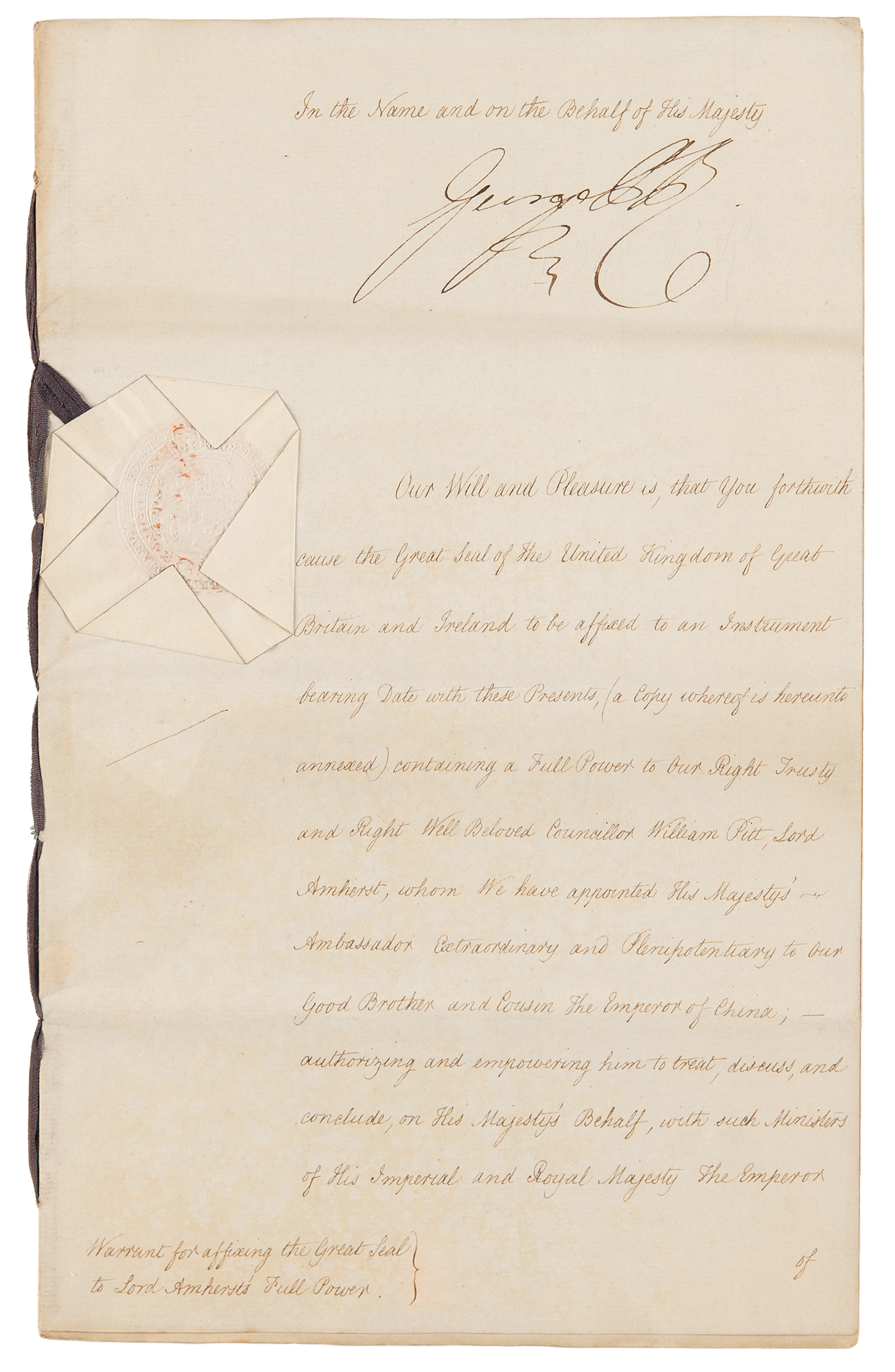
Document of Prince Regent George appointing Lord Amherst

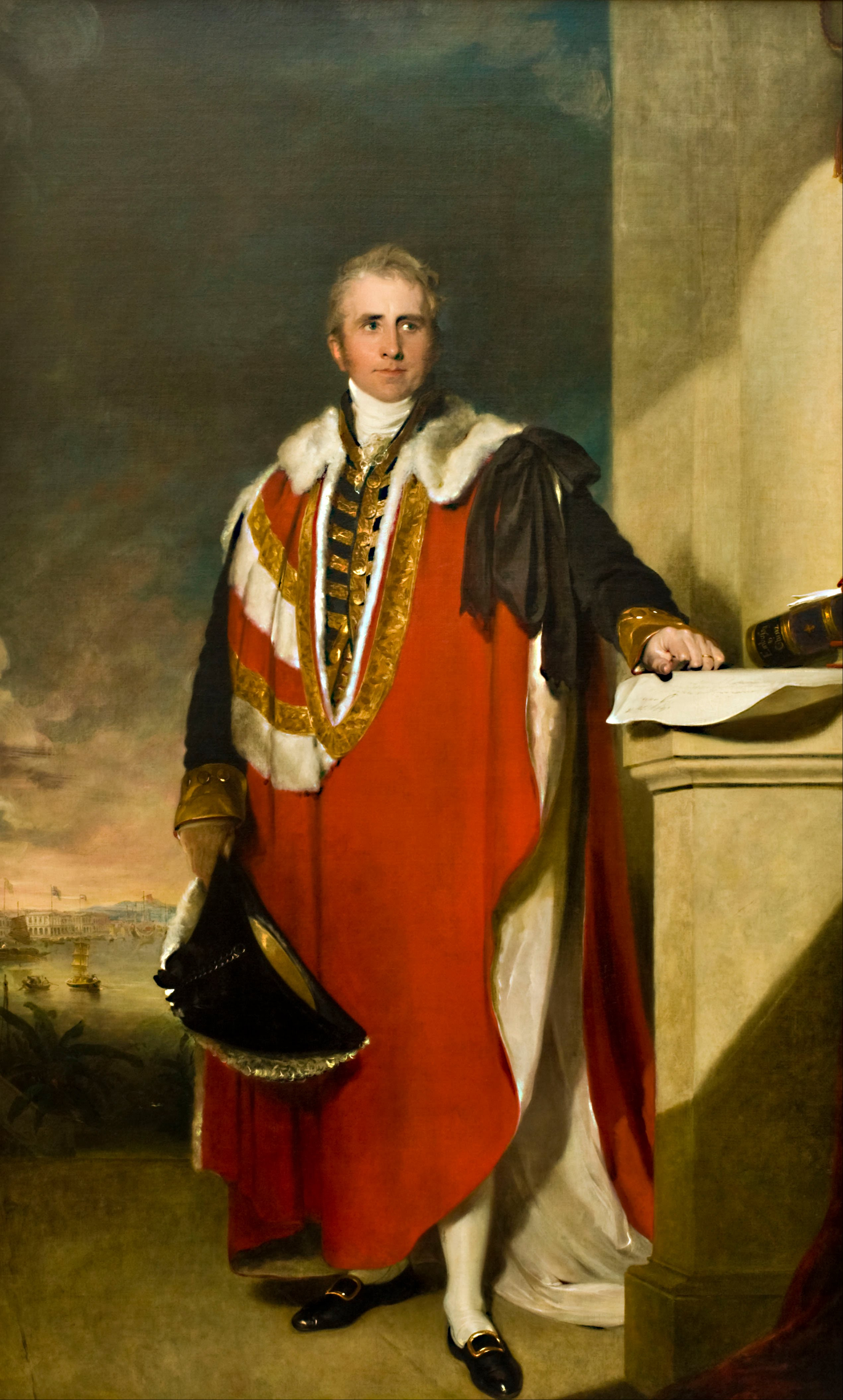
1821 portrait of Lord Amherst; the book on his left is his diary of the visit to China published in 1817

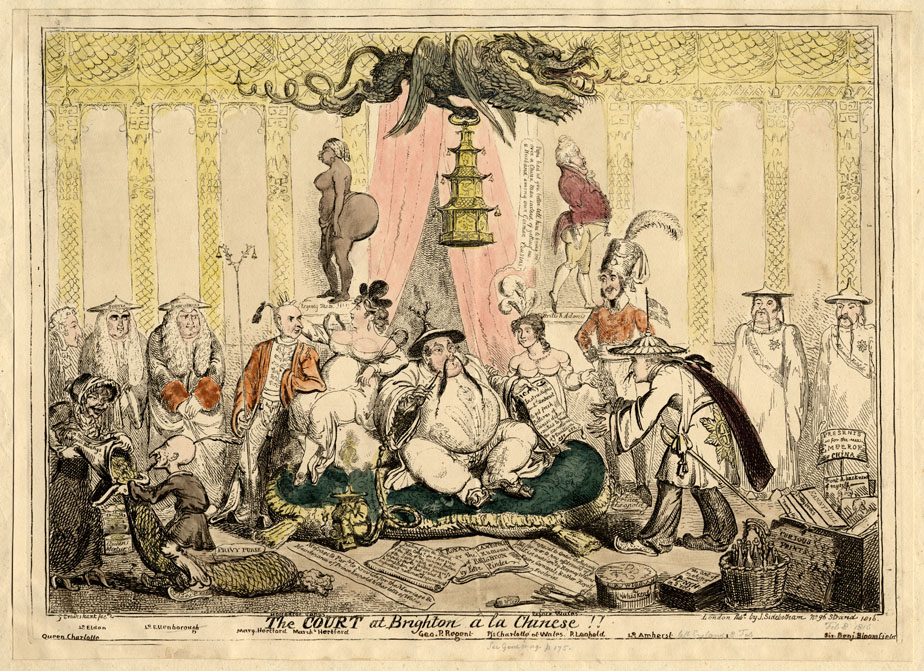
A satirical cartoon depicting the extremely obese Prince Regent in Chinese emperor's clothing issuing credentials to Lord Amherst, who is also dressed in Chinese attire, at the Royal Pavilion in Brighton

Previously, Barrow had repeatedly recommended his student young Staunton to the committee, firmly believing that young Staunton was the ideal choice for chief envoy. However, he obviously did not yet know at this time that young Staunton had already been targeted by Jiaqing because of disputes in Guangdong, nor did he know that young Staunton had regular contacts with the only French missionary Louis Lamiot then working in the Qing court. However, regarding the choice of chief envoy, considering the ongoing war between the company and the Qing tributary Gorkha, the Earl of Buckinghamshire and East India Company senior management unanimously believed that a candidate of high status, imposing appearance, and with a military bearing should be selected. In their view, such a person would be more likely to earn the respect of the Chinese, so young Staunton was thus eliminated.

After the plan to send an envoy was approved on 10 August, the Earl of Buckinghamshire began to look for an ambassador candidate. The East India Company offered a remuneration of 20,000 pounds for the ambassador's long and arduous journey of two years, equivalent to 2 million pounds today. At first, the Earl of Buckinghamshire nominated his friend John Sullivan, who was interested in accepting the position. Sullivan came from a wealthy family, had been a member of the Board of Control, and had also worked in the company, but East India Company senior management believed his qualifications were insufficient. Next, the Earl of Buckinghamshire approached William Amherst, who flatly refused. Finally, the Earl of Buckinghamshire invited a China Hands to serve as ambassador. Just as Binning was hesitating, Amherst, for family financial reasons, changed his mind and was willing to serve as ambassador. Therefore, the Earl of Buckinghamshire agreed that if Binning was unwilling to serve as ambassador, then Amherst would serve as ambassador, and Binning wrote to refuse the position on 15 September. Only then did Amherst get his wish.

On 27 September 1815, the East India Company board officially announced the news of sending a mission to China. On the same day, the board also sent a letter to the Guangzhou factory notifying it of the mission information. The letter confirmed that Amherst would serve as ambassador, and the two top figures of the Guangzhou factory—the chairman of the factory's Select Committee, Elphinstone (Note: John Fullerton Elphinstone of Canton, from a Scottish noble family; his father was the then chairman of the East India Company.) and the China expert young Staunton—had already been nominated as deputy envoys. However, the specific selection of deputy envoys and their status in the mission would be personally decided by Amherst after arriving in China. The British government originally intended to directly appoint Elphinstone and young Staunton as deputy envoys of the mission, but the London board secretly wrote to the British government worrying that the two had previously incurred the resentment of the Chinese government, and appointing them as deputy envoys would instead anger the Chinese government and lead to mission failure. Therefore, with the deputy envoy positions vacant, the Earl of Buckinghamshire appointed his illegitimate son Henry Ellis to serve as mission secretary and plenipotentiary agent when the special envoy was absent, that is, the mission's de facto number two figure. Ellis was a diplomat with a rich resume. After graduation, he entered the British East India Company to work and had previously served as British plenipotentiary to Persia, and participated in the peace treaty negotiations of the 1812 Anglo-American War. (Note: Four days before the mission departed, the Earl of Buckinghamshire passed away.)

=== Amherst's preparations ===
==== Purpose ====
As early as 28 July 1815, when the East India Company chairmen wrote to the Board of Control chairman the Earl of Buckinghamshire, they had already proposed the tasks for the East India Company's envoy mission. When Amherst later accepted the appointment, he also received these requirements from the East India Company:

1. The company's trading privileges should be clearly and detailedly stipulated;
2. Guarantee that trade will not be suddenly interrupted;
3. Chinese government officials shall not intervene in factory affairs; the factory has the right to employ Chinese servants and be exempt from abuse, insults, and brutal treatment by Chinese officials;
4. Factory members can establish liaison channels with Beijing judicial institutions through permanent personnel or Chinese documents, and have the right to use Chinese in various letters and documents to local authorities; (Note: Based on the Chinese diplomatic system at the time, foreign merchants in Guangzhou did not have the right to directly negotiate with the authorities and could only report to the authorities through Hong merchants in the form of petitions. Based on this regulation, local officials often refused to accept letters that violated the regulations, and even communications between foreigners in China were affected. In the eyes of the British, "petition" originally referred to lower officials reporting to higher officials, so it was not equal. In addition, the British also believed that the translated versions submitted by local authorities through the petition system were extremely unreliable, distorting the original meaning of British documents and causing the British to suffer grievances.)
5. Explain the "Doris incident" and other suitable political topics for discussion.

The primary objectives of the Amherst Embassy (1816) were to improve Sino-British relations, bypass the local authorities in Guangzhou (Canton) to appeal directly to the imperial court regarding the grievances of British merchants, and establish a stable, long-term foundation for bilateral trade. Following the British government's instructions, the mission sought to achieve at least one of three specific communication goals: establishing a British consulate in Guangzhou, securing a permanent diplomatic presence in Beijing, or ensuring that the British factory in Guangzhou had a direct line of communication with the central government. Although the Qing court had previously rejected similar proposals during the Macartney Embassy in 1793, British officials still hoped the Jiaqing Emperor would permit permanent envoys in Beijing. They envisioned that unimpeded communication with both central and local authorities would safeguard the British East India Company's commercial interests from arbitrary treatment by local officials. Furthermore, while securing trade in Guangzhou and stabilizing diplomatic channels, Amherst aimed to negotiate the mutual establishment of permanent embassies and open additional trading ports along the coast north of Guangdong.

==== The kowtow issue ====
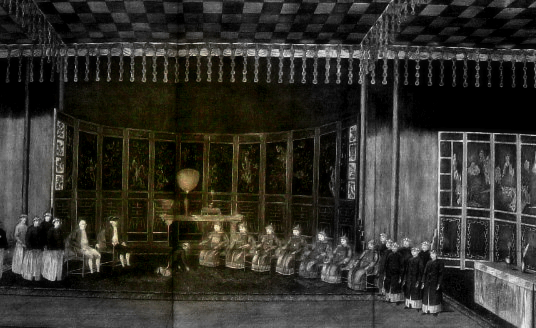
In 1795, Qianlong receives the Dutch mission led by Titsingh and van Braam Houckgeest.

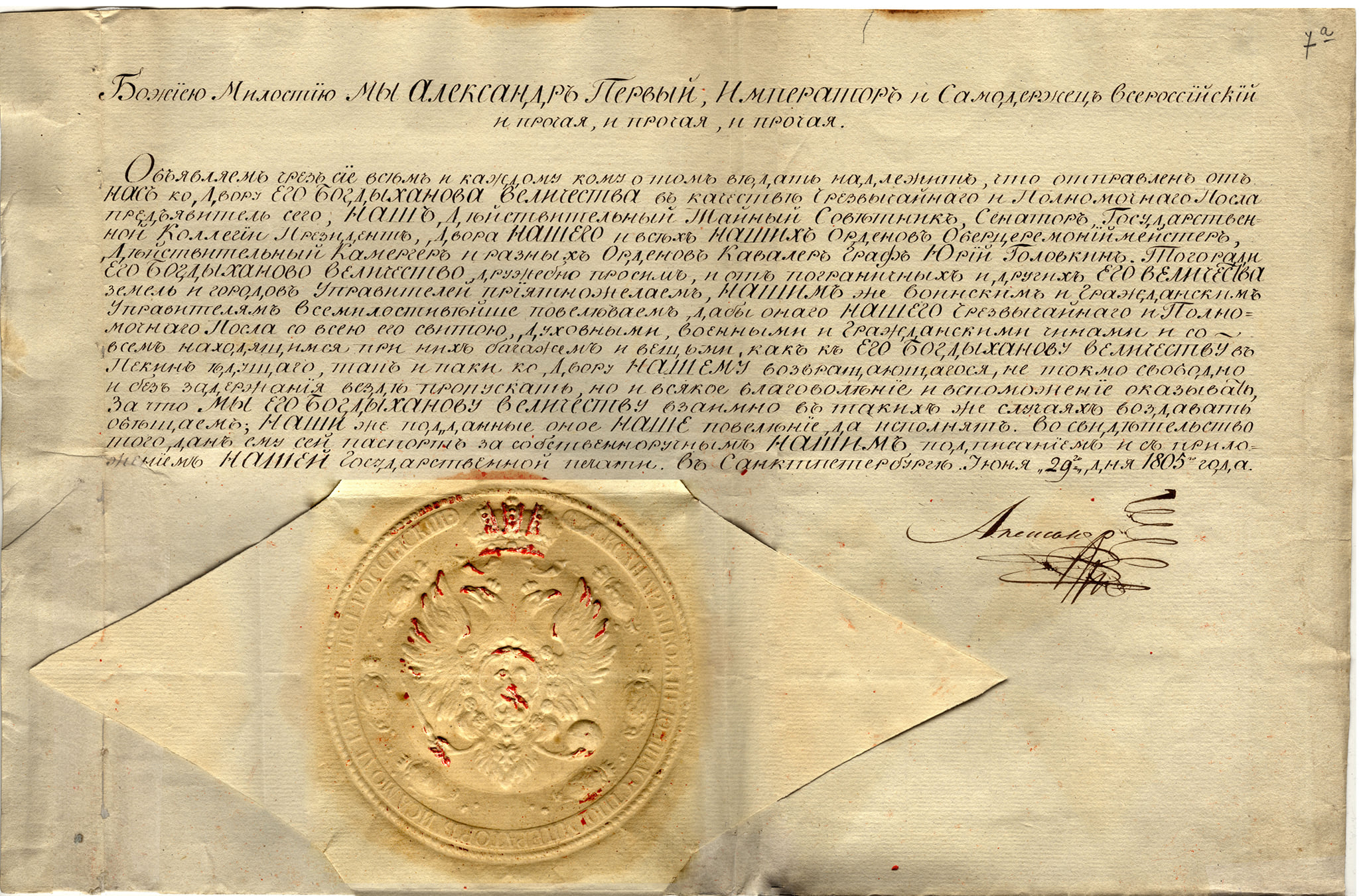
Passport of Russian envoy Golovkin when representing Russia on a mission to China in 1805

Before conducting diplomatic negotiations, Amherst first needed to consider how to obtain an audience with the emperor, which naturally involved the issue of whether to kowtow to the Chinese emperor. In the eyes of the British, kowtow was humiliating and unequal. Amherst hoped to conduct equal diplomacy based on the Westphalian system, avoiding humiliating three kneelings and nine prostrations, or finding alternative methods. For this, he studied many previous cases, missionary records, and intelligence from the Guangzhou factory—he also received assistance from Sir John Barrow, who had participated in the Macartney Embassy. Barrow had read the records of the Dutch mission; the Dutch mission respectfully completed all rituals and kowtowed to the emperor but achieved nothing due to missionary interference, so even kowtowing could not guarantee the success of the mission. Amherst also noticed that when the Russian Izmaylov mission met Kangxi in 1720, although Izmaylov ultimately kowtowed to Kangxi, when Kangxi later sent envoys to Russia, the envoys performed Russian rituals before the Tsar, thereby achieving diplomatic reciprocity. The Macartney case led Amherst to believe that it was possible to have an audience with the emperor without kowtowing, and that kowtowing was only a ceremonial issue and could not solve the mission's substantive problem—of resolving trade disputes with China on an equal basis; however, there were more examples showing that if kowtowing was refused, there could be no audience with the emperor, for example, the Golovkin mission in 1805 was sent back by Jiaqing for this reason. Amherst also received a letter from the Beijing Catholic missionary Louis Lamiot, who emphasized that neither the Macartney nor Golovkin visits to China had properly managed the Chinese officials receiving the missions, thus leading to failure.

Amherst still hoped to establish equal relations with China, so he believed that if the state letter could specify adherence to Macartney's etiquette, diplomatic embarrassment could be avoided. On 1 January 1816, on the eve of the mission's departure, British Foreign Secretary Lord Castlereagh issued instructions to Amherst. The instructions emphasized on one hand the importance of the mission to Sino-British trade; the mission not only bore the trading interests of the East India Company but was also regarded as the last remedial measure to bring Sino-British relations back on track; as for the issue of whether to kowtow, Lord Castlereagh agreed that "Your Excellency may perform all the ceremonies of the Chinese court" in order to complete the mission; however, he also required that the etiquette performed by Amherst "must not damage the honor of the country or lower Your Excellency's own dignity," which placed Amherst in a dilemma. Amherst wrote to the Earl of Buckinghamshire and Lord Castlereagh requesting clarification: Castlereagh required Amherst to adhere to the Macartney precedent and also granted him great discretionary power; the Earl of Buckinghamshire first replied "I cannot determine which rituals embody the monarch's glory or damage the emperor's dignity," and then admitted that Amherst would likely need to respond prudently and adapt to circumstances at the time—for the etiquette performed by Macartney, the Earl of Buckinghamshire did not have the same determination as the Foreign Secretary and Amherst himself, and instead avoided mentioning it in the state letter.

=== Journey and gifts ===
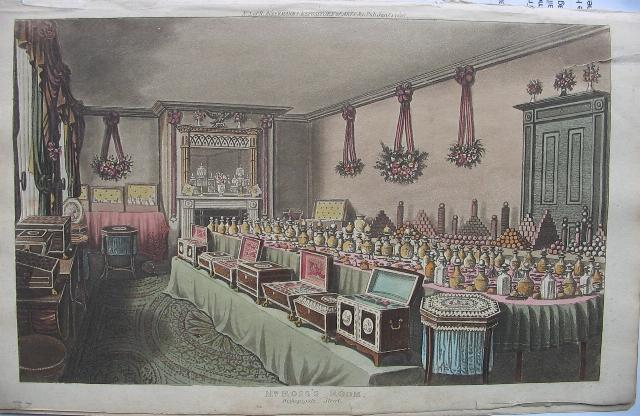
The entire room of perfumes prepared as gifts for the Chinese emperor

In previous research, Amherst had fully recognized the seriousness of etiquette in China. Therefore, in order to make the Chinese attach importance to him and his country—fully learning the lessons of the Macartney Embassy, hoping that China could view Britain equally rather than as a tributary state—Amherst needed to fully demonstrate Britain's strength and status through various means. Amherst not only spent huge sums to purchase gorgeous clothing, decorations, and tableware, hoping to demonstrate British taste and the prosperity of the British Empire, but also decorated the mission's residence at sea as luxuriously as possible and equipped it with fine wine and gourmet food.

In selecting gifts, the Macartney Embassy relied on records from French missionaries, mistakenly believing that the Chinese liked astronomy, ingenious devices, and the like. The gifts finally selected were dismissed by Qianlong as "clever but useless gadgets," and Nan Mide also said that the Jiaqing Emperor advocated frugality and did not like luxury, and would not like such gifts; therefore, most of the gifts selected by Amherst were British products based on showcasing the aesthetics of British upper-class society. Amherst prepared gifts not only for the emperor but also for officials. The gifts carried by the mission included crystal chandeliers, glassware, ceramics, clocks, perfumes, snuff, etc., as well as selected paintings depicting British monarchs, architecture, flowers, etc. Many artisans also wanted to take the opportunity to promote their goods. The total value of these gifts was 22,005 pounds 13 shillings 7 pence, equivalent to more than 2 million pounds today.

To ensure the smooth progress of preparation work, Amherst also contacted various connections in Britain, including the then Speaker of the House of Commons Charles Abbot, the then Secretary of State for War Lord Palmerston, and the captain of the ship HMS Alceste (Note: Alceste, also translated as Alsete, the translation name comes from Notes on Hong Kong.) and close friend Murray Maxwell, the captain of HMS Lyra, (Note: Lyra, also translated as Linla, the translation name comes from Notes on Hong Kong. The translation name appears in Chinese petitions in British archives.) Orlando's (Note: Captain John Clavell, then captain of the Orlando.) Captain Basil Hall and others; Maxwell had already agreed to Amherst's request in October to transport the mission to China. The mission was originally scheduled to depart on December 1, 1815, in order to avoid the typhoon season along the Chinese coast; however, due to delays in the ship's fitting-out and refit, the mission was not able to set sail until February 3, 1816, after the work was completed. In January 1816, London officially notified Guangzhou of the mission's impending arrival. However, since the mission had not yet set sail and the head of the London Trading House in Guangzhou, Yichang, was about to step down, it was not until February 12 that the senior officials of the Trading House convened a meeting regarding the visit. The chair of the meeting, Little Stantone, believed that uncertain information should not be reported to the Chinese government; consequently, the Chinese authorities did not learn of the mission's visit until Amherst's delegation was approaching Guangdong.

=== Members and interpreters ===
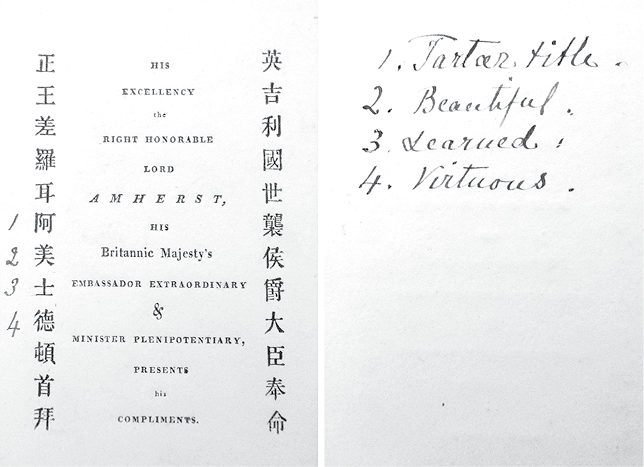
British Library collection of Amherst's bilingual Chinese-English name card; the right side provides an English explanation of the four Chinese characters for "Amherst".

The Amherst mission consisted of 75 people, 20 fewer than the Macartney mission. Members included: the left commissioner, Baron George Staunton, (Note: The younger Staunton, who served as deputy ambassador in the mission.) the right commissioner, Marquess Lord Amherst, (Note: Whose formal position was ambassador extraordinary and plenipotentiary.) the right commissioner Mr. Henry Ellis, (Note: Serving as the mission's third-ranking secretary.) the Chinese secretary and interpreter Mr. Toone, (Note: Bithesi. Serving as the mission's Chinese secretary.) the Chinese secretary and interpreter Mr. Davis, (Note: English: Mr. Davis, also translated as 德庇時 or 爹核士, i.e., the later second Governor of Hong Kong.) the Chinese secretary and interpreter Mr. Morrison, (Note: Serving as the mission's Chinese secretary.) the Chinese secretary and interpreter Mr. Manning, (Note: Serving as the mission's Chinese secretary.) the right commissioner's young master, the Honourable Mr. Amherst, (Note: Amherst's eldest son, serving as the ambassador's aide-de-camp.) the right commissioner's personal Chinese secretary Mr. Hayne, (Note: English: Mr. Hayne, whose actual position was the mission's executive secretary and the ambassador's private secretary.) the chaplain and young master's tutor Mr. Griffith, (Note: Ship's chaplain.) the doctor and naturalist Mr. Abel, (Note: Ship's biologist.) the doctor Mr. Pearson, the doctor Mr. Lynn, (Note: A voluntary medical assistant who received no salary.) the artist Mr. Havell, (Note: The ship's painter.) the guard commander Mr. Cooke, (Note: The guard commander and lieutenant in the navy.) the second guard officer Mr. Somerset, (Note: Guard officer and naval lieutenant.) the gift keeper Mr. Marriage, (Note: Gift administrator, accountant, and auditor.) the gift keeper Mr. Poole, (Note: Assistant to the ship's biologist Abel.) the assistant gift keeper Mr. Abbot, (Note: Midshipman on HMS Alceste.) the assistant gift keeper Mr. Martin, (Note: Midshipman on the ship.) 18 servants, 3 gift attendants, 12 musicians, and 22 guards. Among them, Abel's assistant Poole was actually a gardener sent by Kew Gardens to China to collect plants and seeds along the way. The midshipman Abbot was arranged into the mission by his father, the Speaker of the British House of Commons Charles Abbot, who asked his friend Amherst for the favor.

The Amherst mission also far surpassed the Macartney mission in language ability. When the Macartney mission visited China, there were no usable Chinese talents in Britain, so they had to find two Catholic missionaries who did not speak English as interpreters during the journey, and sometimes even relied on the younger Staunton to learn and use Chinese on the spot. As a result, language barriers were very serious throughout the trip to China. In comparison, the Amherst mission had gathered the top Chinese talents in Britain at the time, with as many as five full-time interpreters. Among them, Morrison's Chinese proficiency may have been comparable to that of the deputy ambassador, the younger Staunton. In addition, the accompanying doctor Pearson actually had some knowledge of Chinese. Among the accompanying interpreters, Manning studied under Europe's top sinologists and was the first Westerner to reach Lhasa and meet the Dalai Lama. After failing to sneak from Tibet into China proper, he came to work at the East India Company factory in Guangzhou. Toone and Davis both studied under Morrison at the Guangzhou factory. Since Toone had returned home for a period in the middle, Davis's Chinese proficiency was relatively better, and he had served as an interpreter accompanying the younger Staunton to meet officials in Guangzhou. Davis was also the first person to translate Chinese literary works into English. Morrison was the first Protestant missionary to come to China and one of the earliest to translate the Chinese Bible. Starting in 1809, he worked for the East India Company in Guangzhou. He was also the most important translator in the team, undertaking important tasks such as translating the state letter into Chinese and providing oral interpretation between officials. In contrast, Chinese officials attached great importance to interpreters. During bilateral talks, interpreters were not allowed to sit, and some officials openly scolded them. However, due to the lack of English talents, Chinese officials had to rely on the British mission's interpreters for most of the time during the mission's visit to China.

The document translation of the Amherst mission was handled by Morrison, with the younger Staunton also participating in the review. Britain still adhered to the principle of diplomatic equality since the Macartney mission, which was also reflected in the mission's translations. When Morrison translated the English state letter, because the previous mission had used the word "imperial commissioner" and was pointed out by the Qianlong Emperor, this time Morrison translated the ambassador's position as the newly coined term "王差" (royal commissioner). However, the mission could not control the Chinese officials' use of the term "tribute envoy," so both sides "expressed their own positions" regarding these titles. In the state letter, the British Prince Regent and the Jiaqing Emperor addressed each other as brothers. When Qing officials saw this, they returned it on the grounds of improper wording, and no one dared to present the state letter to the Jiaqing Emperor. During this period, the Jiaqing Emperor was dissatisfied with the use of the Manchu-specific official title "bithesi" (筆帖式) in the list of titles. In the end, the ministers used the excuse of "admiring the official name" to perfunctorily satisfy the British, and as a result, the private secretary and Chinese secretaries were forcibly changed to "translators." When the mission left, it received an edict issued by the Jiaqing Emperor. After returning home, Amherst criticized the accompanying Latin translation by Louis Lamiot for downplaying the Jiaqing Emperor's arrogant tone of claiming superiority as the Celestial Empire. He therefore asked Morrison to translate it truthfully, reflecting the tone and color of the Jiaqing Emperor's words in the translation.

== Journey to China ==
=== From Britain to "Red River" ===
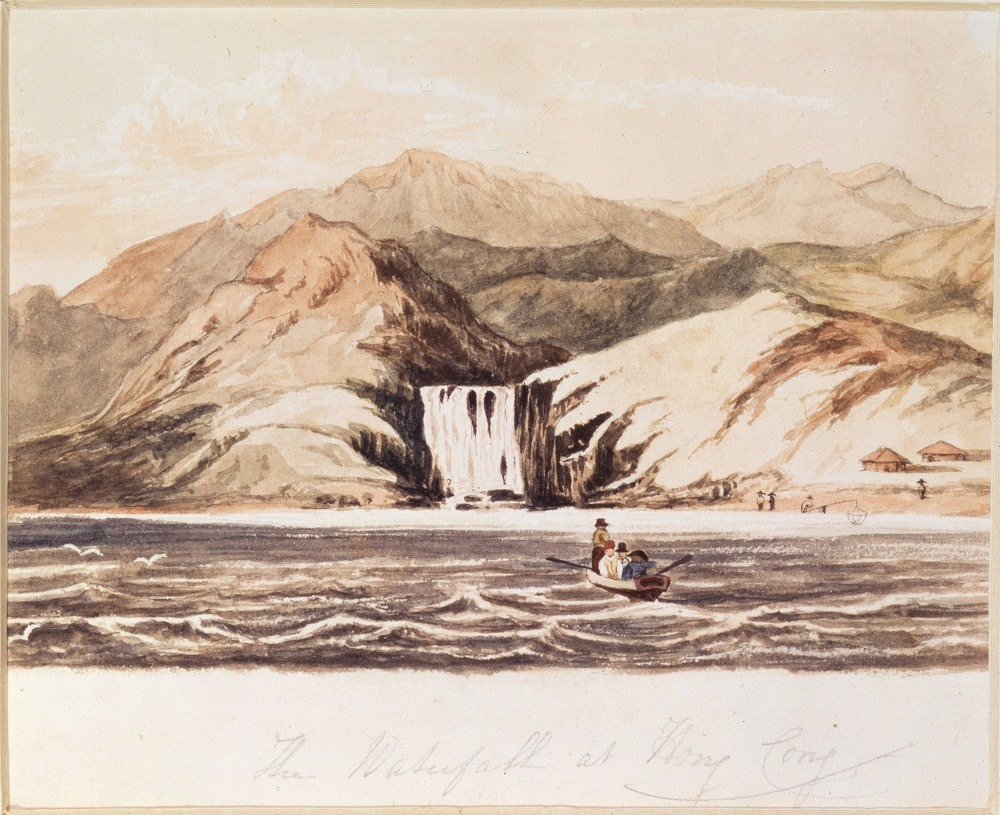
The Waterfall Bay in the old days, painted by the British painter William Havell who accompanied the mission to China

On 8 February 1816, Amherst boarded the British naval ship HMS Alceste, escorted by the British naval ship HMS Lyra and the East India Company chartered ship General Hewett, and set sail from Spithead anchorage, southwest of Portsmouth, England. On 18 February, they passed the Madeira islands of Portugal. In the waters south of the equator, HMS Alceste bid farewell to the two escort ships and headed to Rio de Janeiro, where in Brazil they witnessed the funeral of Queen Maria I of Portugal. On 31 March, HMS Alceste left the port of Rio de Janeiro and arrived at the Cape of Good Hope on 18 April. On 5 May, it left the port for the Dutch East Indies under Anglo-French occupation, entered the Sunda Strait on the west side of Java, and rendezvoused with HMS Lyra and the General Hewett at the Anyer anchorage.

On 25 May, the younger Staunton and others received official notification from the Orlando, which had arrived in Guangdong, that Amherst had already set sail for China, and on the 28th they relayed the news to the acting Viceroy of Liangguang Dong Jiaozeng. On 4 June, the British commissioner Sir Theophilus John Metcalfe (Note: Uncle of another Theo Metcalfe with the same name, and a member of the Select Committee of the Guangzhou factory.) and Captain John Clavell of the Orlando, then captain of the Orlando., accompanied by the Hong merchant Howqua, went to Guangzhou to meet the acting Viceroy of Liangguang Dong Jiaozeng. They formally submitted a petition to the Chinese government and forwarded a letter from the Earl of Buckinghamshire, informing them that the Amherst mission was about to visit China. According to Chinese records, before submitting the letter, the British side had a conflict with Dong Jiaozeng over ceremonial issues. Dong Jiaozeng insisted on the prostration ritual used for "tribute envoys from countries like Siam," but since the British side could not accept it, after negotiation, it was replaced by the British side removing their hats and Dong Jiaozeng rising to indicate acceptance. The British records did not mention the ceremonial conflict but noted that Pan Qiguan had mistakenly reported Clavell as the "barbarian official" bringing the letter. Therefore, the authorities required him to stay in Guangzhou to wait for a reply according to the precedent of the Macartney mission. Although the real commissioner Metcalfe agreed to stay, the authorities forced Clavell and the Hong merchant to guarantee his stay. After Clavell refused, the Hong merchant was implicated and imprisoned. Dong Jiaozeng reported the mission to the Jiaqing Emperor: "The barbarians (Britain) ... because it is the Prince Regent, thinking of the grace of the Gaozong Emperor [Qianlong], admiring the benevolence and sagacity of the Great Emperor, sent an envoy to present tribute to express sincerity and respect, and also to boast of the conquest of France. They stated that the tribute envoy would set off in one month ... and proceed directly to Tianjin, not traveling via Guangdong ..." After learning of the British mission's arrival in China, the leaders of the Thirteen Factories in Guangzhou, Howqua and Pan Qiguan, found Metcalfe, fearing that the younger Staunton would anger the emperor, and hoped he would persuade the younger Staunton not to accompany the mission to Beijing. However, they were refused. Later, the two tried to exert pressure through Dong Jiaozeng but failed.

After the Jiaqing Emperor learned that the mission was about to come to China, on 24 June he issued an edict to closely monitor the movements of the British mission in various places. He ordered the governors of the provinces the mission would pass through—Fujian, Zhejiang, Jiangsu, and Shandong—to instruct coastal prefectures and counties to investigate the position of the British "tribute ships." If they did not cause trouble in the coastal waters, there was no need to intervene. However, if they requested to change course and land midway, local officials must refuse and ensure that the British landed in Tianjin. In addition, the Jiaqing Emperor also ordered the governors to secretly instruct local civil and military officials to "pay close attention and not slacken." On 28 June, the Jiaqing Emperor issued an edict to Guanghui, the salt administrator of the Changlu Salt Division in charge of the Tianjin coast, stating that there was no need to welcome this British mission as grandly as the Macartney mission and to follow "precedents." He explicitly stated: "I do not take joy in this matter; why deliberately cater and exaggerate?" The Jiaqing Emperor also sent an edict to the Viceroy of Zhili Nayan Cheng, saying that the British mission was pretending to pay tribute with unclear intentions. If the British mission proposed increasing treaty ports as in the previous Macartney mission, they should reply that "the Celestial Empire has strict laws and regulations, and we dare not rashly memorialize; put an end to their delusions." He specifically required that the mission must "submit with sincere words" to be granted an audience; otherwise, use the excuse that the emperor was not in Beijing and it was inconvenient for the envoys to stay long to send them away. The Jiaqing Emperor also ordered the army to prepare "to provide suppression."

On 21 June 1816, Amherst's party set sail from Batavia (present-day Jakarta). On 8 July, upon entering the waters near Lamma Island off Guangdong, Amherst immediately sent someone to Guangzhou to contact the younger Staunton. In fact, to prevent Guangzhou officials from demanding they hand over gifts and forcing the mission to travel to Beijing by land, (Note: After the Macartney mission visited China and returned, the Qianlong Emperor had issued an edict welcoming Britain to send another mission, at which time the envoys could land in Guangzhou, and the Qianlong Emperor would send people to Guangzhou to welcome them.) the younger Staunton and his party had taken the British naval ship Discovery out to sea to Macau on the 7th and dispatched the HMS Investigator to contact Amherst. Amherst had also dispatched HMS Lyra northward on 12 June to contact the younger Staunton. HMS Lyra finally found the younger Staunton on 8 July. Both sides agreed to meet at Stanley Bay (or the north side of Lamma Island) between Hong Kong Island ("Red River" island) (Note: Although written as "Hong Kong" in English, the same as today's Hong Kong Island, at that time both Morrison and Davis believed that "Hong Kong" referred only to a river called "Red River" on today's Hong Kong Island. Mission members often referred to it as the entire island in their records.) and Lamma Island, and finally rendezvoused near "Red River." Before meeting the mission, the younger Staunton had already learned on 25 May that he had not been appointed deputy ambassador and felt very dissatisfied. On 9 July, the younger Staunton, along with Morrison, Davis, Manning, and other factory personnel, set out from Macau to welcome Amherst. Amherst and others noticed the younger Staunton's dissatisfaction. To win over the younger Staunton, who had been slow to join the mission, Amherst still appointed him as deputy ambassador. The Guangzhou authorities also reported the younger Staunton's movements to the Jiaqing Emperor. The acting Viceroy of Liangguang Dong Jiaozeng stated that "the British king appointed Staunton as deputy tribute envoy to the capital because he had previously entered the capital and was familiar with the Celestial Empire's etiquette," believing that the British side appointed him deputy because of his familiarity with Celestial etiquette. However, the Jiaqing Emperor did not buy it. After receiving the report, in an edict on 4 August he severely reprimanded Dong Jiaozeng for allowing the younger Staunton and others to go to sea privately and ordered officials everywhere to strictly guard against them. At this time, the British mission had already arrived in Tianjin.

=== Arrival in Tianjin ===
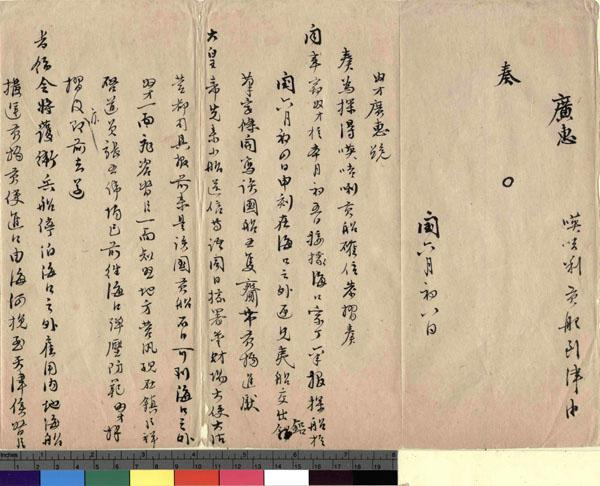
Guanghui reports that the "British tribute ship" mission has arrived in Tianjin

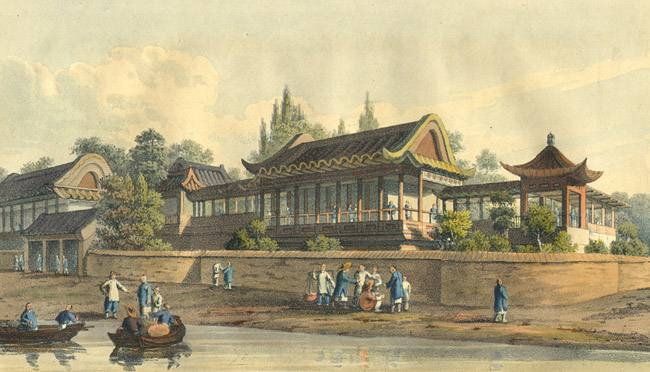
The Liushu Travelling Palace in Tianjin as drawn by the mission

On 13 July, the mission departed from Hong Kong Island ("Red River" island). On the 15th and 16th, they passed Daqiu Island and Xiaoqiu Island. On the 17th, they sailed out of the Taiwan Strait. On the 18th, they reached the Zhoushan Islands. On the 21st, they turned toward the Bohai Sea. On the night of the 26th, they anchored near the Miao Islands at the entrance to the Bohai Sea. During the voyage, the mission reached an internal consensus on the negotiation content, with two points: first, to establish a diplomatic embassy in Beijing and strive to establish a communication channel between Beijing and Guangzhou; second, to open one or two additional treaty ports. During the voyage, the Chinese translation of the state letter was translated by Morrison on 22 July and reviewed by the younger Staunton before being handed over to Amherst. Before arriving in the Bohai Sea, on the 25th the mission sent HMS Lyra ahead to deliver the list of mission personnel and the gift list to the Viceroy of Zhili and requested that he dispatch the same number of ships as the previous visit. However, due to heavy fog, they were unable to contact HMS Alceste. On 28 July, the fleet arrived at Dagu Kou. HMS Lyra, responsible for transmitting information, was 6 miles offshore, while the other ships were 15 miles offshore. HMS Lyra made contact with several Chinese fishing boats.

On the morning of 29 July, Zhang Wuwei, the Tianjin Circuit intendant, and Yin Bin, vice-general of the Shanyong Brigade, boarded HMS Lyra to make contact with the British side and informed them that the Viceroy of Zhili would receive the mission at Dagu Subdistrict. On the 30th, Zhang Wuwei and Yin Bin boarded HMS Lyra again, bringing a Cantonese as an interpreter. However, the mission members did not speak Cantonese, so the two finally took away the mission's letter to the Viceroy of Zhili. In fact, the Viceroy of Zhili Nayan Cheng had been dismissed for corruption a few days earlier on 24 July, so the mission was unable to meet the Viceroy of Zhili they had hoped for at this time. On the 31st, Zhang Wuwei and Yin Bin boarded HMS Alceste to meet Amherst. Subsequently, Amherst landed to meet Guanghui, the Changlu salt administrator. This was Amherst's first meeting with Chinese officials. Guanghui presented the mission with a large amount of food as a gift. On 1 August, the Jiaqing Emperor appointed Su Leng'e, who had served as superintendent of the Guangdong Maritime Customs during the Macartney visit, and the Changlu salt administrator Guanghui as imperial commissioners to go to Tianjin to welcome the mission. Finally, on 4 August, Guanghui, accompanied by Tianjin Circuit intendant Zhang Wuwei and vice-general Yin Bin, boarded the ship to host a welcome banquet on behalf of the mission. The British side again submitted the personnel list and gift list and informed them that the mission was preparing the translation of the state letter and planned to submit the translation to the Grand Council minister Tozhin. At the same time, the Qing court had already begun to arrange plans for the mission's audience. On 4 August, the Qing court sent an edict to Su Leng'e and Guanghui. The Jiaqing Emperor hoped that the time of the mission's audience could avoid the period of palace fasting on 26 August. The plan was for the mission to visit the Old Summer Palace on 23 or 24 August and wait for summons.

On 8 August, Amherst convened the mission to discuss the kowtow issue. Amherst himself was worried that refusing to kowtow would lead to the mission being sent back. His left-hand man, the younger Staunton, strongly advocated refusing to kowtow, while his right-hand man Ellis believed that achieving the audience mission was more important. The younger Staunton emphasized that yielding would not bring substantive concessions on trade issues and hinted to Amherst that the Chinese side might cancel the ceremony. On 9 August, the mission landed at Dagu Kou. On 10 August, the Jiaqing Emperor instructed Su Leng'e and Guanghui to bring the mission "on schedule" to the Scorpion Lake Guesthouse in Haidian Town on 21 August to stay, wait for summons to the Hall of Supreme Harmony on 24 August, then spend the next few days watching operas, visiting, and banqueting at the Old Summer Palace, go to the Huitong Siyiguan in Beijing on the 27th, receive rewards and titles at the Hall of Supreme Harmony in the Forbidden City on the 29th, and leave Beijing the next day to depart from Tianjin by sea for home. At the same time, he instructed the two to discuss ceremonial issues before the mission's audience. If the British mission refused to kowtow, they needed to be guided. At the Tianjin banquet, Su Leng'e and the British mission should perform the ritual to thank for the banquet in order to test the sincerity of the British mission. On 12 August, the mission arrived outside Tianjin city. Su Leng'e and Guanghui boarded the ship to meet Amherst. After exchanging pleasantries, Su Leng'e proposed to see the translation of the state letter from the Prince Regent to the Jiaqing Emperor, which Amherst refused. Amherst informed Su Leng'e that it needed to be submitted to the Jiaqing Emperor's close ministers according to the Macartney mission precedent, but Su Leng'e claimed that he had been ordered to take full responsibility for the matter. Just as the two sides were at a stalemate, Su Leng'e suddenly asked if the younger Staunton was the child brought during the Macartney mission's visit to China. The younger Staunton immediately admitted it, and the meeting was able to break the deadlock and continue. Su Leng'e also invited the mission to attend a banquet. After the meeting, the younger Staunton found Amherst. He believed that Su Leng'e and Guanghui repeatedly used terms like "imperial countenance" and "bestowed banquet" in their invitations, actually hinting that there would be ceremonial issues at tomorrow's banquet. The mission members unanimously believed that they should not kowtow to the emperor's symbolic objects.

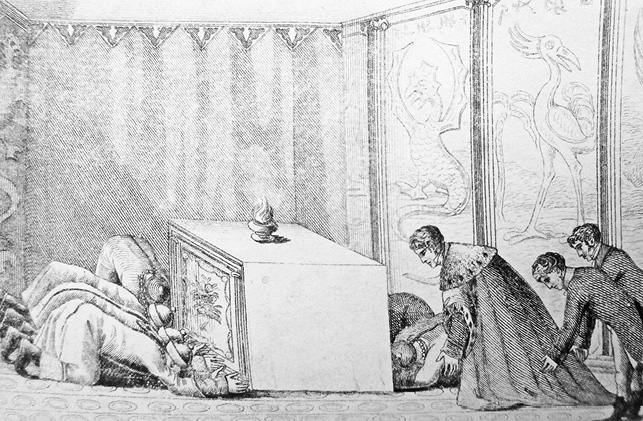
1820 published sketch depicting the Amherst mission and Qing ministers performing different rituals toward the emperor's symbolic object

On 13 August, the mission entered Tianjin city. Su Leng'e and Guanghui welcomed the mission at the entrance of the Tianjin Circuit yamen. However, before the banquet, Su Leng'e suddenly proposed that the mission members should perform the grand ritual toward the incense table enshrining the Jiaqing Emperor's tablet according to Chinese etiquette. Amherst said he would pay respects to the emperor as he would to his own sovereign. Su Leng'e emphasized the kowtow ritual, while Amherst advocated the Macartney precedent. Su Leng'e claimed that Macartney had also kowtowed to the Qianlong Emperor at that time, while Amherst said that Macartney's report stated that he had performed British etiquette. Subsequently, Su Leng'e questioned the younger Staunton, who replied that he was still young at the time and could not remember. (Note: Regarding whether the Macartney mission really performed the three kneelings and nine kowtows to the Qianlong Emperor, historical records differ and historians still have disputes. In this article, all Chinese officials and the Jiaqing Emperor himself believed that the Macartney mission had the precedent of three kneelings and nine kowtows and that the younger Staunton could corroborate it. The Jiaqing Emperor was a witness to the event. The Irish amanuensis of the Macartney mission, Edward Winder, recorded "kneeling nine times to the ground" without mentioning kowtow. In the original manuscript of his diary, the younger Staunton described kneeling on one knee and bowing heads to the ground when meeting the Qianlong Emperor, but later crossed out "to the ground." The official reports written by John Barrow and Macartney denied that Macartney had knelt. Although Amherst repeatedly insisted on the "precedent" of Macartney, the Jiaqing Emperor believed that the British envoys' performance of the ritual was inferior to Macartney's.) In the end, the Chinese side made a concession. The British side followed the Macartney precedent, with both sides performing rituals according to their own etiquette: the Chinese side performed three kneelings and nine kowtows, while the mission members removed their hats three times, bowed deeply nine times, and rose nine times. As for the ritual to be performed before the Jiaqing Emperor himself, Amherst repeatedly emphasized the Macartney precedent and was willing to take responsibility himself. At the same time, the Grand Council had already formulated plans and rituals for the mission's audience according to the Jiaqing Emperor's instructions. Although the mission had not yet promised to follow Chinese etiquette, the Qing court had already meticulously planned all the details of the mission's performance of the ritual.

=== Road to Beijing ===
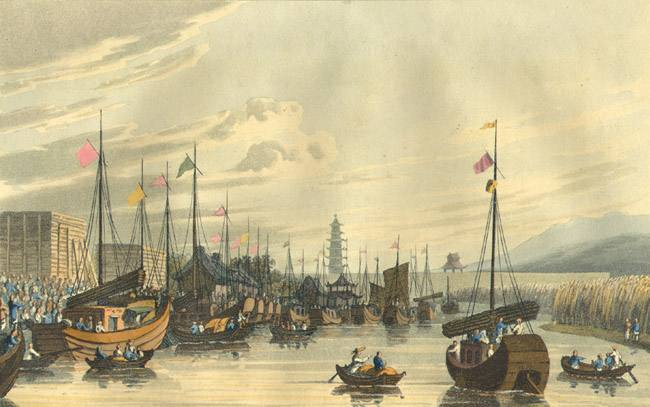
The mission's anchorage at the canal in Tongzhou

To avoid delaying the schedule arranged by the Jiaqing Emperor, Su Leng'e and others set off "on schedule" for Beijing on 14 August. Along the way, both Su Leng'e and Guanghui were anxious, deeply afraid that failing to make the mission kowtow would anger the emperor. Therefore, they privately found the younger Staunton and hoped he could persuade Amherst. After reading the report on the situation in Tianjin on the 15th, the Jiaqing Emperor was indeed furious. He first accused the two of not following the face-to-face instructions and required them to bring the mission into the capital only after the mission complied with Chinese etiquette. He then ordered them to pressure the younger Staunton, who had participated in the Macartney mission, to make up for his merits. Finally, he warned the two that if they brought the mission to the capital without practicing the etiquette, the mission would be swept out and the two would be punished. At the end of the edict, the Jiaqing Emperor was still not satisfied and wrote in vermilion "never tolerate" and warned the two "do not regret it at that time."

Su Leng'e and Guanghui were extremely terrified after receiving the edict. On the same day, they submitted a memorial to the Jiaqing Emperor to plead guilty. On the 16th, the Jiaqing Emperor ordered the ships to stop, so the mission halted at Cai Village in Wuqing County. Su Leng'e and Guanghui immediately found Amherst and others for a face-to-face talk, using the threat that failure to perform the ritual would result in repatriation to pressure the mission. However, Amherst refused to change the etiquette on the grounds of "not daring to privately change the etiquette of our country" and still insisted on the previous "hat removal, bowing, rising" ritual. Seeing this, the two again pressured the younger Staunton according to the Jiaqing Emperor's instructions, while the younger Staunton responded that "when returning home, I heard the chief ambassador inform the king that [Macartney] performed the ritual according to the etiquette of our country, so this time we dare not change it ... I really cannot remember," and used the fact that his position in the mission was lower than Amherst's and that he obeyed the chief ambassador's orders as a shield. As a result, the two sides were deadlocked for several days.

Finally, while the two sides were deadlocked, Amherst proposed that he could conditionally perform three kneelings and nine kowtows, following the precedent of the Russian mission, as long as a Chinese minister of equal rank performed the same ritual toward the Prince Regent's portrait during or before the audience, or when China sent an envoy to Britain to perform three kneelings and nine kowtows toward the British king, then Amherst would be willing to perform the ritual. However, Su Leng'e and Guanghui did not dare to report the British envoy's request. During the dispute, Guanghui angrily scolded the translator Morrison for not translating truthfully, and Morrison once refused to translate for him. While the Sino-British sides were deadlocked over the ceremonial issue, the British warship carrying the mission left without saying goodbye on the 14th and sailed south from Tianjin. Upon hearing this on the 17th, the Jiaqing Emperor was furious and reprimanded Su Leng'e and Guanghui. He also heard that the younger Staunton claimed he "completely did not remember the ritual performed," and specifically pointed out that the younger Staunton's "deceitful and deceptive behavior is extremely abominable," writing in vermilion "evasive and abominable" and "the words are extremely deceptive." The Jiaqing Emperor originally wanted to immediately expel the mission, but because the ships had already left, he could only let them continue forward.

On 18 August, the Jiaqing Emperor replaced the responsible officials and ordered the mission to proceed to Tongzhou. The ones sent to welcome the mission were the Jiaqing Emperor's close minister, the imperial uncle Duke Heshitai, president of the Lifan Yuan, and the Minister of Rites Mukdengge. The Jiaqing Emperor also strictly ordered Su Leng'e and Guanghui not to leak the personnel changes to the mission. In the edict to Hesitai and others, the Jiaqing Emperor stated that "as for Staunton, in the 58th year of Qianlong he accompanied his father to pay tribute. At that time, the tribute envoys wanted to perform the ritual of their own country, and after slight guidance, they immediately complied with the three kneelings and nine kowtows ritual. Staunton personally witnessed it ... As for what you said 'when the previous tribute envoys returned home, they informed your king that they still performed the ritual of their own country,' how you informed your king when you returned home, our Celestial Empire did not ask." He directly accused the Staunton father and son of making false reports to the British government on the issue of the Macartney mission's performance of the ritual. However, when Qing officials told Amherst that as long as he could perform the ritual, he could report however he wanted to Britain, Amherst not only strongly opposed it but also righteously regarded false reporting as shameful. On 22 August, the mission arrived in Tongzhou. Upon meeting, Hesitai and others immediately issued an ultimatum to the mission on the kowtow issue, but the mission firmly resisted kowtowing, and the situation became deadlocked again. At this time, Amherst proposed that if the Chinese emperor refused to receive them due to the ceremonial issue, please inform them of the return time as soon as possible.

The Jiaqing Emperor ordered Hesitai to set 28 August as the deadline. If the mission still refused, there was no need to guide them further; they should await the emperor's instructions. Hesitai reported to the Jiaqing Emperor that "the tribute envoys' etiquette has not yet been in accordance with the ritual" and that they were still "practicing together." After receiving the emperor's deadline order, Hesitai and others, deeply afraid of being blamed for poor handling, again tried to find the younger Staunton but were refused by him. On the 25th, the Jiaqing Emperor continued to require Hesitai to practice but softened his attitude somewhat: "Do not be overly harsh in all matters, lest you lose the ritual of controlling the outsiders. Even in the 58th year (referring to the Macartney mission in the 58th year of Qianlong), it was also a matter of making do. This is just one matter. In short, sending them back is not as good as receiving them." At the same time, the mission also had internal differences on the ceremonial issue. The British side's Amherst, Ellis, and others believed that refusing to kowtow would lead to the failure of the mission, but the younger Staunton strongly opposed kowtowing and convened East India Company members to express their opinions. The younger Staunton held the majority vote among the mission and Guangzhou factory members. In the end, Amherst decided to adopt the younger Staunton's opinion and had this decision translated into a document by Morrison and handed over to Hesitai. After receiving the document, Hesitai instead informed the mission that they would proceed to Beijing that day. After the mission repeatedly confirmed with the officials and received consistent replies, after being stalled for several days, they hurriedly began to prepare for the journey.

=== Expelled from the capital ===
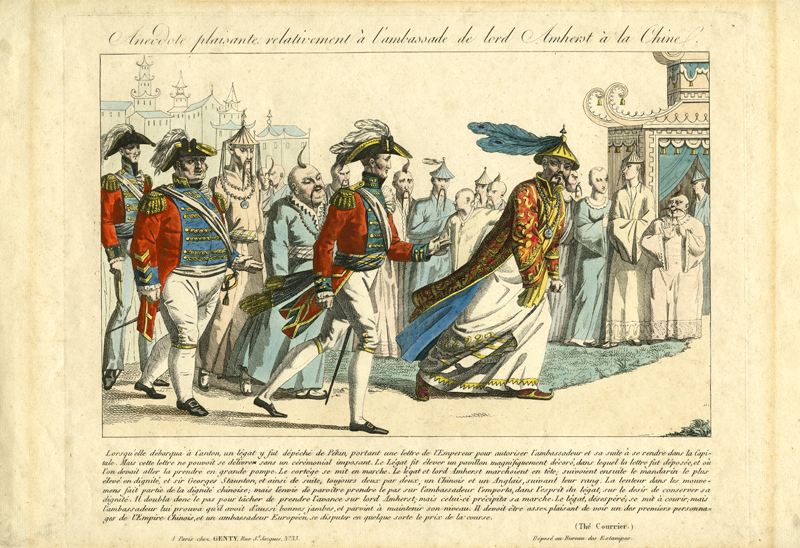
French political caricature depicting the Amherst mission in Beijing

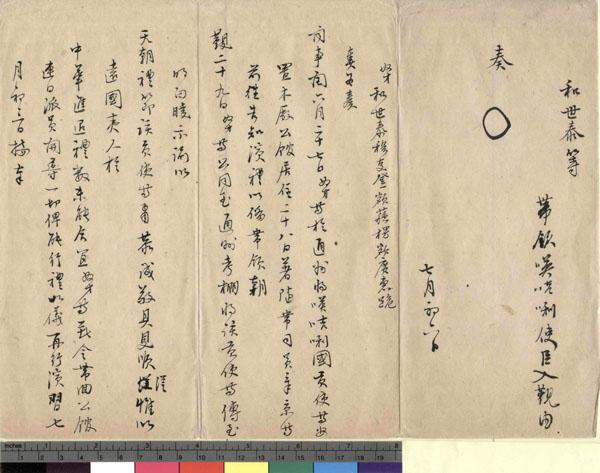
Hesitai, Mukedenge, Su Leng'e, and Guanghui jointly memorialize leading the mission for audience

On 27 August, Hesitai falsely reported to the Jiaqing Emperor that although the mission's "rising and kneeling was not very natural, they were still able to perform the ritual with effort" and that on 28 August they would bring the mission to the Scorpion Lake Guesthouse to await the audience, deliberately concealing the fact that the mission refused to perform the Chinese ritual. To the Amherst mission, he claimed that the emperor had exempted the three kneelings and nine kowtows ritual. After reading it, the Jiaqing Emperor gladly ordered the mission to enter the capital and arranged audience, banquets, visits, and other matters for the mission, scheduling the audience at the Old Summer Palace on the 30th. On the 28th, the Jiaqing Emperor temporarily summoned Hesitai and Mukedenge, but Hesitai and others could only advise the Jiaqing Emperor that "it is really impossible to make the envoy change the practiced ritual, but tomorrow during the audience they will surely be able to perform the ritual without losing propriety." The Jiaqing Emperor himself was quite dissatisfied with Hesitai's statement of "inability to perform the ritual" and severely reprimanded him for "being overly indulgent, making do, and bringing them directly." He then issued an edict arranging for the mission to have an audience the next day. Therefore, Hesitai had to hurry back to Tongzhou in the afternoon to urgently arrange the mission's journey into the capital.

On the afternoon of 28 August, the British mission suddenly received the order for the audience and hurriedly prepared to go to the Old Summer Palace for the audience, setting off at 4 p.m. The mission's carriage team was temporarily assembled, and the gifts were transported by Chinese carriages, while Amherst's carriage could only be pulled by four mules. The group either rode in mule-drawn small carts or on horseback, hurrying until dark. After dark, they continued on the bumpy road at night until 9 p.m. The hungry mission members, after enjoying the disgusting dinner prepared by Su Leng'e and Guanghui for the mission (which Amherst himself described as "disgusting"), rested for only one hour before setting off again. At midnight, they arrived at the foot of Beijing city. The Nine Gates Infantry Commander was ordered not to close the city gates to welcome them. However, the mission did not enter Beijing but took a shortcut to the Old Summer Palace. The mission's carriages and horses occasionally got stuck in the bumpy muddy roads, and conditions only improved after reaching the main road. At 5 a.m. on 29 August, the mission finally arrived at a side courtyard near the Old Summer Palace to rest. However, the officials still did not allow the mission to get off the carriages to rest and instead directly took them to the Old Summer Palace.

On 29 August, the Jiaqing Emperor arrived early at the Hall of Supreme Harmony at 6:30 a.m. to wait for the audience. At this moment, the mission's chief and deputy ambassadors were being "guided" by the accompanying Manchu officials to a remote corner of the Old Summer Palace. Since the audience was advanced by one day from the scheduled 30th and only Amherst, his son, and deputy ambassador the younger Staunton were received, the mission members believed that this audience was only a private informal one. The necessary formal attire and state letter were not prepared in time, so they strongly requested a one-day postponement of the audience, but this was ignored by the Manchu officials. After Su Leng'e and Guanghui's oral guidance failed, Hesitai, while saying it could be according to "your etiquette," attempted to drag Amherst out of the room by force but was met with Amherst's strong resistance. Afterward, Amherst insisted on returning to the guesthouse to rest. The mission concluded that the so-called "guidance" was nothing more than taking advantage of the mission's fatigue to force compliance, and Hesitai could no longer succeed as wished. The Jiaqing Emperor, waiting in the Hall of Supreme Harmony, summoned them three times but only received responses of "the chief ambassador cannot walk fast," "the chief ambassador has diarrhea and will be delayed for a moment," and "the chief ambassador has fallen ill and cannot attend the audience." He had no choice but to issue an edict to wait until the chief ambassador "recovers" before meeting and first summon the deputy ambassador. He was then told that "the deputy ambassadors are all ill and will attend together after the chief ambassador recovers." The Jiaqing Emperor sent the imperial physician to visit the mission. The imperial physician reported back to the Jiaqing Emperor that the mission members were not ill. Feeling fooled, the Jiaqing Emperor angrily issued an edict: "China is the lord of all under heaven; how can there be such arrogance and insult that we willingly endure? Therefore, we reject the tribute and do not accept it, and issue an edict to expel the envoys and send them back to their country." He also dismissed and punished Hesitai and others. At 11 a.m., the mission received the news of repatriation. In shock, they were ordered to return to Tongzhou. In the afternoon, the Nine Gates Infantry Commander dispatched officers to sweep the mission out, informing them that if they were willing to kowtow, there was still a final chance for an audience, but this was rejected by the mission. The mission traveled day and night in wind and rain and finally arrived in Tongzhou in the early morning of the 30th.

On 30 August, the Jiaqing Emperor learned the ins and outs of the matter. Knowing that the British envoys had been unwilling to kowtow from the beginning and learning that Hesitai and others had deceived their superiors and concealed the truth, he placed all the blame on Hesitai and others for "repeatedly violating the edicts, causing the foreign envoys to offend against propriety." However, considering that "Britain sent envoys across ten thousand li of ocean to present a memorial and pay tribute, showing their sincere admiration and desire to transform," as an apology, he sent someone to catch up with the mission and exchange gifts. The British side's gifts included 4 geographical maps, 2 portraits of the king and queen, and 95 copperplate prints of British landscapes and figures. The Chinese side's gifts were 1 white jade ruyi scepter, 1 string of jadeite court beads, 2 pairs of large pouches, and 8 small pouches. The Jiaqing Emperor specially permitted the Amherst mission to travel through China's interior. He believed that even if the British drew maps, the places the mission passed through were deep in the interior and would be of no benefit to Britain coming by sea. It would precisely allow the British mission to understand "the vastness of China's territory and the dangers of its mountains and rivers." On the same day, the Jiaqing Emperor issued an edict to the British monarch. This edict was transmitted via the postal route and finally arrived in Guangzhou, where it was solemnly handed over to Amherst by the Viceroy of Liangguang Jiang Youxian on 6 January 1817. In this edict, the Jiaqing Emperor was no longer generous and magnanimous. On one hand, he displayed the majesty of all nations coming to pay court and accused the British of not complying with Chinese etiquette. On the other hand, considering that Britain was far overseas and sending envoys "would laboriously involve much talk, which is not what we enjoy hearing," and that "the Celestial Empire does not treasure distant objects," he therefore ordered that if Britain was unwilling to perform the ritual, it need not send envoys in the future.

== Return journey ==
=== Exploring China's interior ===
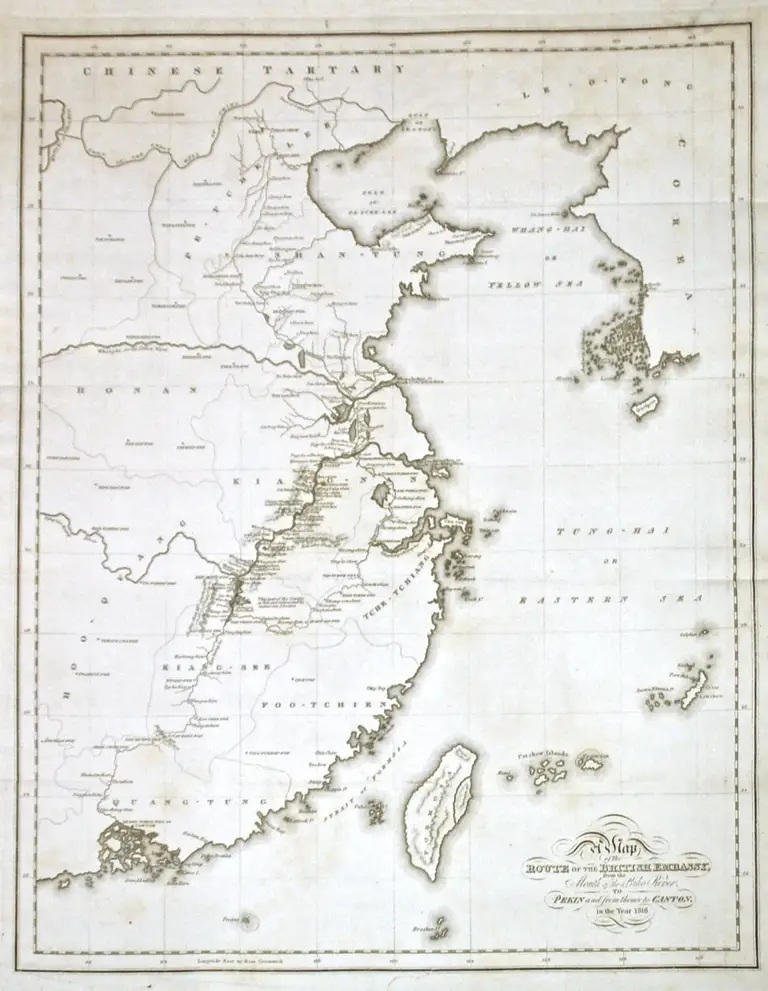
Map of the route of the Amherst mission's travel through China's interior

The Jiaqing Emperor blamed the failure of the mission on his ministers and never explained to the mission the reason for refusing the audience. The vast majority of members within the mission blamed the failure on the Jiaqing Emperor. When the mission reported to the Foreign Secretary George Canning, they described the Jiaqing Emperor as a tyrannical and capricious despot. Along the way from Tianjin to Beijing, the Jiaqing Emperor repeatedly issued contradictory and inconsistent orders, especially after the mission had undergone a sleepless long journey overnight, he abruptly decided to repatriate the mission—this was truly against the way of hospitality and undoubtedly an insult to the mission. On 4 September, the mission saw in the Peking Gazette the edict in which the Jiaqing Emperor blamed Hesitai for the mission's issue, which was relatively friendly toward the mission. However, in the gazette sent to Guangzhou, the Jiaqing Emperor issued an edict to the Viceroy of Liangguang accusing the mission of refusing to perform the ritual. The mission believed that the two edicts—one was for the Chinese to see, and the other was issued for the foreigners in Guangzhou. This inconsistent attitude made the mission dissatisfied. As for the ministers the Jiaqing Emperor accused, the mission instead believed that they had all fulfilled their duties and obeyed orders. Although the Jiaqing Emperor granted the mission the right to travel freely after leaving the capital, the mission's resentment toward the Jiaqing Emperor only increased.

After being repatriated, the British began a new journey with a sense of frustration. The mission would spend four months crossing China's interior and arrive in Guangzhou in January 1817. On 2 September 1816, the mission returned to Tianjin. A few days later, on 8 September, the mission departed from Tianjin and sailed south along the Grand Canal. The mission's fleet consisted of 60 boats, carrying 73 British people, 400 Chinese boatmen and trackers, accompanying officials, and all the gifts and luggage of the British mission. Guanghui, who was punished, accompanied the mission south. The mission arrived at the first stop in Shandong, Linqing County, on 22 September; Dongchang Prefecture on the 24th; and Jining Prefecture on the 29th. On 4 October, they entered Jiangsu territory. On 5 October, they spent the Chinese Mid-Autumn Festival at Zhongxing, Suqian County. On 6 October, they crossed the Yellow River. On 8 October, they arrived at Qingjiangpu. On the 10th, they arrived at Yangzhou Prefecture. On the 14th, they arrived at Guazhou Town, where the canal meets the Yangtze River. After the boats entered the Yangtze River, unlike the Macartney mission which continued along the canal to Suzhou, they followed the shortcut designated by the Jiaqing Emperor, going up the Yangtze River and the Gan River. Subsequently, the mission entered the Yangtze on the 19th, sailed upstream, and arrived in Nanjing on the 21st. On 1 November, the mission left Nanjing. The next day, they arrived at Datong Town in Anhui and stayed there. On the 7th, they set off for the Poyang Lake area. On the 14th, the fleet entered Poyang Lake and took shelter from the wind at Dagutang on Dagu in Hukou County. Subsequently, on the 23rd, they arrived in Nanchang and continued along the route of the previous Macartney mission. Although the weather was bad, the mission still arrived in Ganzhou Prefecture on 11 December. On the 18th, they abandoned the boats and traveled overland in Nankang County, beginning to cross the Dayu Range. On the 19th, they passed Meiguan and entered Guangdong territory. On 25 December, the mission switched to water routes in Shaoguan. On 1 January 1817, they arrived in Guangzhou.

Although the Jiaqing Emperor very generously granted the British mission the right to travel through China's interior, in reality the mission's itinerary was arranged to depart at dawn and arrive at cities at midnight. At the same time, the mission was under surveillance and restrictions by local officials everywhere, so they almost had no opportunity to visit the interiors of any towns or interact much with the people. Even so, the mission was able to tour China's interior more deeply than the Macartney mission and was deeply impressed by the decline of the Qing dynasty. After the Qianlong Emperor's death, the Jiaqing Emperor decided to practice frugality and no longer make southern tours. As a result, the banks of the canal on which the mission sailed south were full of dilapidated relics left from the previous Qianlong southern tours, and the infrastructure in various places had long been in disrepair. The younger Staunton, who had participated in the Macartney mission, was particularly touched by this. In addition to the poor lives of ordinary people, the mission also observed the backwardness of Qing military equipment. Most Qing soldiers were still in the era of cold weapons, commonly using bows and arrows. When they used huochong, after lighting the fuse, they would stay far away and squat with their backs turned to avoid injury from bursting barrels. At the same time, the mission found that although Chinese officials and people knew nothing about foreign affairs, they were blindly arrogant about their own country. Based on these observations, the mission believed that although Chinese civilization was the foremost in Asia, compared to European civilization it had long been eclipsed and could only be considered semi-civilized.

=== The fleet sailing south to Guangdong ===
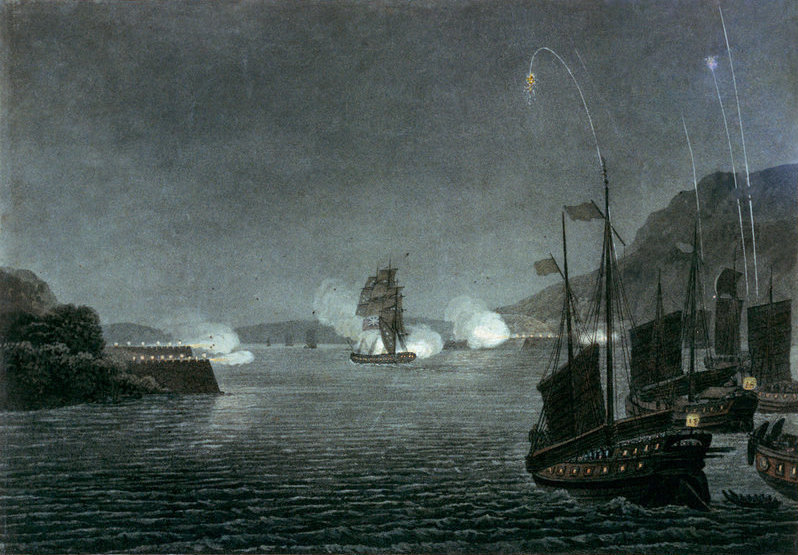
HMS Alceste bombarding Humen

The Amherst mission not only conducted surveys of many sea areas along the Chinese coast but also reached the then-closed Joseon dynasty and the Ryukyu Kingdom, which had not yet been discovered by the West at that time. After leaving Tanggu, the British fleet could not wait to plan to divide into three routes to explore the Bohai Sea, "which European navigators had never set foot in": the General Hewett was responsible for surveying the central route in the Bohai Sea; HMS Alceste sailed south from Tanggu to survey the hydrology along the coasts of the Bohai Bay and Laizhou Bay and landed at Weihaiwei to replenish fresh water; HMS Lyra sailed south along the west coast of the Liaodong Peninsula to Lüshun Kou, crossed the Bohai Strait to reconnoiter near Penglai; and the three ships finally rendezvoused in Laizhou Bay.

Under the leadership of Captain Basil Hall of HMS Lyra, HMS Alceste and HMS Lyra continued sailing east to Korea and landed at Maryangjin in Seocheon County, Chungcheong Province, on 4 September 1816. Although due to language barriers the fleet had little communication with the Korean people, Captain Maxwell of HMS Alceste presented a copy of the Bible as a gift to the local officials, making Maryangjin one of the starting points for the dissemination of the Bible on the Korean Peninsula. After leaving Korea, Hall's party arrived at Naha Port in the Ryukyu Kingdom on 16 September. Due to a storm damaging the ships, Hall's party stayed in Ryukyu for more than 40 days, investigating the local customs and conditions. Their records also inspired Matthew Perry's 1853 expedition to Japan to force Ryukyu to open its ports. To express thanks to the Ryukyu people for repairing the ships, Hall and others requested to meet the King of Ryukyu, but King Shō Kō refused on the grounds of the Qing edict that "the King of Ryukyu shall not meet people from other countries except for the Celestial Empire's investiture envoys."

After departing from Ryukyu, HMS Alceste arrived at Lingdingyang at the mouth of the Pearl River in Guangdong on 2 November 1816. Upon arriving in Guangdong, to avoid wind and waves and following the precedent of the Macartney mission, the mission requested permission from the Guangzhou authorities to anchor at the inner river Huangpu port. However, the Guangzhou authorities delayed for several days and did not allow entry. The fleet then proceeded on its own to the Bogue and engaged in combat with the Qing naval forces. Facing the Qing navy controlling the sea entrance and the Humen forts, HMS Alceste fired a shot that hit the command ship and stopped its action. With only a starboard broadside, it silenced the Bogue forts, successfully sailing into the inner river's Erdao Beach and protesting to the Guangzhou authorities. The Viceroy of Liangguang Jiang Youxian concealed the facts and falsely claimed that HMS Alceste sailed too fast, so the Bogue forts did not receive the order to allow entry and fired at the British ship, saying nothing about the British counterattack. In Britain, Captain Maxwell of HMS Alceste was therefore regarded as a hero who bravely defended the dignity of the British Empire.

=== Leaving China ===
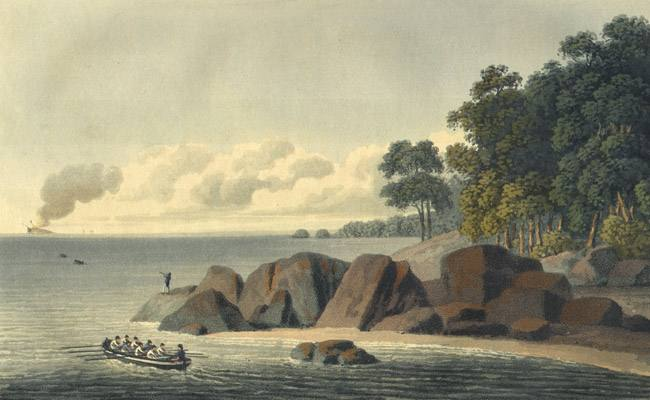
The crew escaping from HMS Alceste to Pongok Island

In this incident, the Jiaqing Emperor determined that the younger Staunton had interfered, so on 30 August and 6 September he issued two consecutive orders to the Viceroy of Liangguang Jiang Youxian, ordering him to prohibit foreign merchants from sheltering the younger Staunton. After the younger Staunton and the mission returned to Guangdong, they were to "return to their country together, without permission to stay" and "never allowed to come again." In his reply memorial, Jiang Youxian further proposed to engrave the British envoys' discourtesy during their visit to China into a book and publish it publicly, in order to demonstrate the majesty of the Celestial Empire and make foreign countries submit in awe. The Jiaqing Emperor did not agree and instructed Jiang Youxian to hold a grand banquet in Guangdong to send them off, requiring him not to mention a word about the Beijing matter, "to demonstrate the greatness of the Celestial Empire."

On 1 January 1817, Amherst's party and the fleet reunited in Guangzhou. On the 3rd, the mission held a banquet with the British factory in Guangzhou and the American consul. On the 6th, the Viceroy of Liangguang held a grand ceremony for the mission and handed over the Jiaqing Emperor's edict to the British king. On the 9th, the Hong merchants held a farewell banquet for Amherst. On the 13th, the British factory held a farewell banquet for the younger Staunton, who was ordered to return home. On the 20th, the mission departed from Huangpu port for home. On 23 January, the mission arrived in Macau, but the Macau authorities refused to receive the mission on the grounds of holding a state funeral for the Portuguese queen. In the end, the East India Company and landed British naval soldiers held a ceremony for the mission themselves. On 28 January, the mission left Macau and arrived in Manila on 2 February. After leaving Manila, the mission sailed for Java, but on the way HMS Alceste struck a reef and sank near the Gelasa Strait. Amherst and his party were forced to abandon ship and were stranded on Pongok Island. After many twists and turns, they finally reached Java Island and on 12 April transferred to the East India Company ship Caesar to return home. On 27 May, they arrived at the Cape of Good Hope and stayed in Cape Town.

On 11 June, the mission left Cape Town and arrived at Saint Helena on 27 June. When Napoleon I, imprisoned on the island in March 1817, learned that the Amherst mission was about to visit, upon hearing that the British had been expelled for refusing to kowtow, he could not help complaining that the British did not know how to follow local customs and comply with Chinese etiquette. Napoleon agreed to Amherst's visit request, and the two met privately on 29 June. Previously, Amherst had already heard of Napoleon's mockery of the British for not following local customs. Napoleon repeatedly satirized to those around him: "If British etiquette was not kissing the hand but kissing the buttocks, would the Chinese emperor also have to take off his pants?" However, during the actual meeting, Napoleon patiently listened to Amherst's account without any comment and talked about his own situation on the island. After Amherst left, Napoleon privately expressed that although Amherst himself intended to follow local customs and comply with Chinese etiquette, he ultimately listened to the younger Staunton's wrong advice, which led to the failure of the mission. Napoleon also opposed the idea of opening China's doors by force. After visiting Napoleon, the mission left Saint Helena on 2 July and returned to Britain on 17 August.

== Aftermath ==
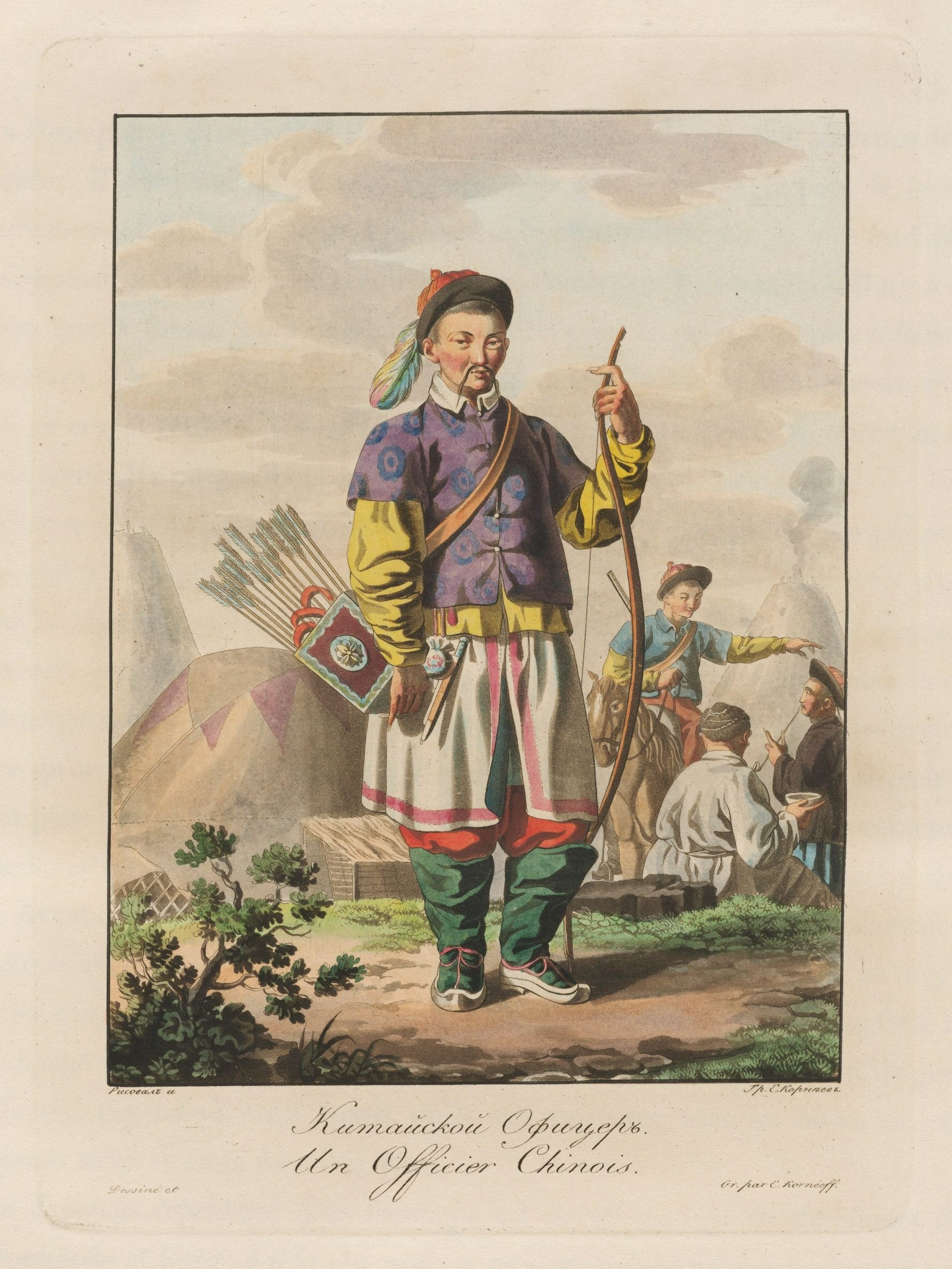
Qing officer of the Jiaqing era using a bow and arrow

=== China ===
After Amherst returned home, the then Viceroy of Liangjiang Sun Yuting, who had previously served as Guangdong governor, was summoned for an audience. The Jiaqing Emperor ordered him to describe the British situation: he first recalled that when the British entered for an audience during the Macartney mission, "their legs were tightly bound in trousers and stockings, standing straight and unable to bend," so they could not perform the full ritual. He also said: "(The British) if they do not get tea, everyone will suffer from eye disease. We can control their life and death, and they will surely fear us. Moreover, their ships are too large, and the inner sea waters are shallow, so they absolutely cannot maneuver. And they fear fire attacks the most and are powerless! If they make reckless requests, they must be rejected according to the Celestial Empire's laws and regulations. If the situation makes it impossible, there is no need to blame them with Chinese ceremonial formalities." When discussing British national power, Sun Yuting said: "Their wealth comes from China. They exchange what they have for tea and resell it to neighboring barbarians, hence their wealth. But if they have no tea for one day, they fall ill. If we ban it, they will become poor and distressed—how can they be strong?" The Jiaqing Emperor therefore paid special attention to controlling the import and export of tea and ordered the prohibition of tea sea transport, allowing only land transport of tea, to eliminate the risk of "colluding with barbarians." The Jiaqing Emperor also consulted the Viceroy of Liangguang Jiang Youxian on whether Sino-British trade could be completely interrupted thereafter, but Jiang Youxian reported that nearly seventy percent of the Guangdong Maritime Customs revenue came from British merchants. The Jiaqing Emperor therefore abandoned this idea.

To prevent the British from provoking incidents along the coast due to the mission's expulsion, the Jiaqing Emperor transferred Ruan Yuan to be Viceroy of Liangguang in 1818. Ruan Yuan also submitted two memorials on 29 January and 10 May of that year to prevent British affairs. Ruan Yuan believed that what the British sought in China was nothing but commercial interests, so "it is better to control them more with awe than to appease them entirely with virtue. Otherwise, they will be insatiable, advancing one step and then another, and troubles will arise from this." He requested the Jiaqing Emperor to prepare three strategies—"stop trade," "cut off food and prohibit purchases," and "attack and destroy ships that intrude into the inner sea without authorization." But the Jiaqing Emperor did not have much confidence in his own military strength and instead required Ruan Yuan to use force cautiously with the words "our troops may not be very strong." Sun Yuting's views on the British and the idea of "using trade to control the barbarians" were also inherited by the monarch and ministers of the Daoguang era. Even when Lin Zexu went to Guangdong to handle the opium issue, he still planned to "use trade to control the barbarians," while Qishan and others still firmly believed that without tea the British would "die immediately from constipation" and that "their wealth comes from China."

After the letter of credence issued by the Jiaqing Emperor to the King of England returned to Britain, it remained sealed and untouched in the British Foreign Office until 1891, when the office was organizing its records and discovered the Chinese-side documents, requesting the Chinese embassy to authenticate them; After being authenticated by Halliday McCartney, then-Counselor at the Qing Embassy in Britain and a descendant of Lord Macartney, the original box—wrapped in layers of yellow silk and containing the imperial edict in Manchu, Han, and Latin languages—was brought to the Chinese Embassy and eventually reached the hands of Xue Fucheng, the Qing Minister to Britain.

=== Britain ===
Compared to the Macartney visit to China, the Amherst mission's attitude toward China further deteriorated. What Macartney saw was China at the end of the Kang-Qian prosperity, and the Qianlong Emperor he met had "outstanding understanding, extraordinary mental vitality, and decisive temperament." What Amherst witnessed was China in the period of Jia-Dao decline, and the Jiaqing Emperor himself was "the most stubborn and self-willed person" and the real cause of Guangzhou trade disputes. Although Macartney believed Chinese military power was weak, he still "harbored illusions" about diplomacy toward China, while Amherst believed that the Chinese self-centered sense of superiority made any equal diplomatic channel unable to change trade with China, which also laid the groundwork for the later Opium War. Thereafter, the British government abandoned the practice of improving bilateral relations and promoting trade interests through dispatching diplomatic missions.

Through their observations of China, the mission further abandoned illusions about its political system—that the Qing court was the main obstacle to Sino-foreign exchanges and social progress. The mission members and Guangzhou factory personnel who participated in the mission determined that the Qing government was a despotic and tyrannical regime that, in addition to restricting trade and encouraging xenophobia, also persecuted the people in extremely inhumane ways within Chinese society and suppressed resistance. John McLeod, the surgeon on the Alceste, believed that the Qing government used a policy of obstructing the population's enlightenment to make them believe that its rule was “at the summit of perfection”, but in fact it was “the absurd tyranny of fettering the human understanding, by forbidding all innovation and improvement”. In their dealings with the Chinese court, the British deeply felt the other side's bullying the weak and fearing the strong, and fear of the British causing trouble, so they became more inclined to maintain their own interests with a tough attitude. Although the East India Company's leadership abandoned the idea of changing China from the outside and instead required the Guangzhou factory to humble itself to preserve trade interests and cooperate with the authorities to stop the illegal activities of country traders in China, Sino-British relations experienced more than ten years of relative calm thereafter. At the same time, however, the power of British country traders continued to grow, and their contradictions with the East India Company and Guangzhou authorities intensified, eventually replacing the East India Company's position in China trade and pushing the London authorities to face China with a tougher posture.

After returning home, the younger Staunton entered the British Parliament as a purchased seat. Although during his time as a member of parliament, as an expert on China issues in Parliament, he strongly defended the East India Company's monopoly and opposed the opium trade, when conflict between China and Britain broke out again in 1840 due to trade, the younger Staunton still spoke in the House of Commons in support of the war against China: "The war now being prepared is a world-class war, and its outcome will have immeasurable impact ... Although it is regrettable, I still believe that this war is right and necessary."

== Bibliography ==
=== Collected journals ===
- Gao, Hao (2016). "The "Inner Kowtow Controversy" During the Amherst Embassy to China, 1816–1817". Diplomacy & Statecraft. 27 (4): 595–614. doi:10.1080/09592296.2016.1238691. ISSN 0959-2296.
- Huang, Yi-Long (2007). "Yìnxiàng yǔ zhēnxiàng ──qīngcháo zhōng yīngliǎng guó de jìn lǐ zhī zhēng" 印象與真相──清朝中英兩國的覲禮之爭 [Impression vs. Reality: A Study on the Guest Ritual Controversy between Qing China and Britain] (PDF). 歷史語言研究所集刊 [Bulletin of the Institute of History and Philology] (in Chinese). 78 (1). Taipei: Academia Sinica: 35–106. doi:10.6355/BIHPAS.200703.0035. ISSN 1012-4195. Archived from the original on 2024-02-12.
- Wang, Hongzhi (2015). "1816 Nián āměi shì dé shǐ tuán de fānyì wèntí" 1816年阿美士德使团的翻译问题 [Translation in the Amherst Mission to China in 1816]. In Wang, Hongzhi (ed.). Fānyì shǐ yánjiū 翻译史研究 [Translation History Studies] (in Chinese). Vol. 2015. Shanghai: Fudan University. pp. 52–98. ISBN 978-7309119909.

=== Books ===
- Abel, Clarke (1819). Narrative of a journey in the interior of China and of a voyage to and from that country in the years 1816 and 1817. London: Longman.
- Ellis, Henry (1817). Journal of the Proceedings of the Late Embassy to China. London: John Murray.
- Ellis, Henry (2013) [1817]. Journal of the proceedings of the late embassy to China [阿美士德使团出使中国日志]. Translated by Liu Tianlu; 刘甜甜. 北京: 商务印书馆. ISBN 9787100099844.
- Gao, Hao (2019). Creating the Opium War: British Imperial Attitudes Towards China, 1792–1840. Manchester: Manchester University Press. ISBN 978-1-5261-3342-7.
- Greenberg, Michael (1951). British Trade and the Opening of China, 1800-1834. Cambridge University Press.
- Greenberg, Micheal (1964) [1951]. British Trade and the Opening of China, 1800-1834 [鸦片战爭前中英通商史]. Translated by 康成. 北京: 商务印书馆.
- Hou, Yi (2020). Xiǎo sī dāng dōng yǔ zhōng yīng zǎoqí guānxì shǐ yánjiū 小斯当东与中英早期关系史研究 [Little Staunton and the History of Early Sino-British Relations] (in Chinese). Beijing: China Social Sciences Press. ISBN 978-7-5203-6065-4.
- Ma, Lianpo (2003). Wǎn qīng dìguó shìyě xià de yīngguó: Yǐ jiāqìng dàoguāng liǎng cháo wéi zhōngxīn 晚清帝国视野下的英国：以嘉庆道光两朝为中心 [Britain from the Perspective of the Late Qing Empire: Focusing on the Reigns of Jiaqing and Daoguang] (in Chinese). Beijing: People's Publishing House.
- Morrison, Robert (1820). A Memoir of the principal occurrences during an embassy from the British Government to the Court of China in the Year 1816. London: self-published.
- Morse, Hosea Ballou (1926). The Chronicles of The East India Company Trading To China, 1635-1834. Vol. III. Cambridge, MA: Harvard University Press.
- Peyrefitte, Alain (1989). L'empire immobile ou le choc des mondes [The Immobile Empire] (in French). Paris: Fayard. ISBN 978-2-213-02025-9.
- Peyrefitte, Alain (1992). The Immobile Empire. New York: Knopf. ISBN 0-394-58654-9.
- Peyrefitte, Alain (2007) [1989]. L'empire immobile ou le choc des mondes [停滞的帝国：两个世界的撞击] (in French). 北京: 生活·读书·新知三联书店. ISBN 9787108026934.
- Stevenson, Caroline M. (2020). Britain's Second Embassy to China: Lord Amherst's 'special mission' to the Jiaqing Emperor in 1816. The Australian National University Press. doi:10.22459/BSEC.2020. ISBN 9781760464080. JSTOR j.ctv1h45mhm.
- Wang, Kaixi (2009). Qīng dài wàijiāo lǐyí de jiāoshè yǔ lùnzhēng 清代外交礼仪的交涉与论争 [Negotiations and Debates on Diplomatic Etiquette in the Qing Dynasty] (in Chinese). Beijing: People's Publishing House. ISBN 978-7-01-007781-9.
- Xiao, Zhizhi; Yang, Weidong (1985). Yāpiàn zhànzhēng qián zhōngxī guānxì jìshì (1517-1840) 鸦片战争前中西关系纪事(1517-1840) [A Chronicle of Sino-Western Relations Before the Opium War (1517-1840)] (in Chinese). Wuhan: Hubei People's Publishing House.
