= Clarke Abel =

British surgeon and naturalist (1780-1826)

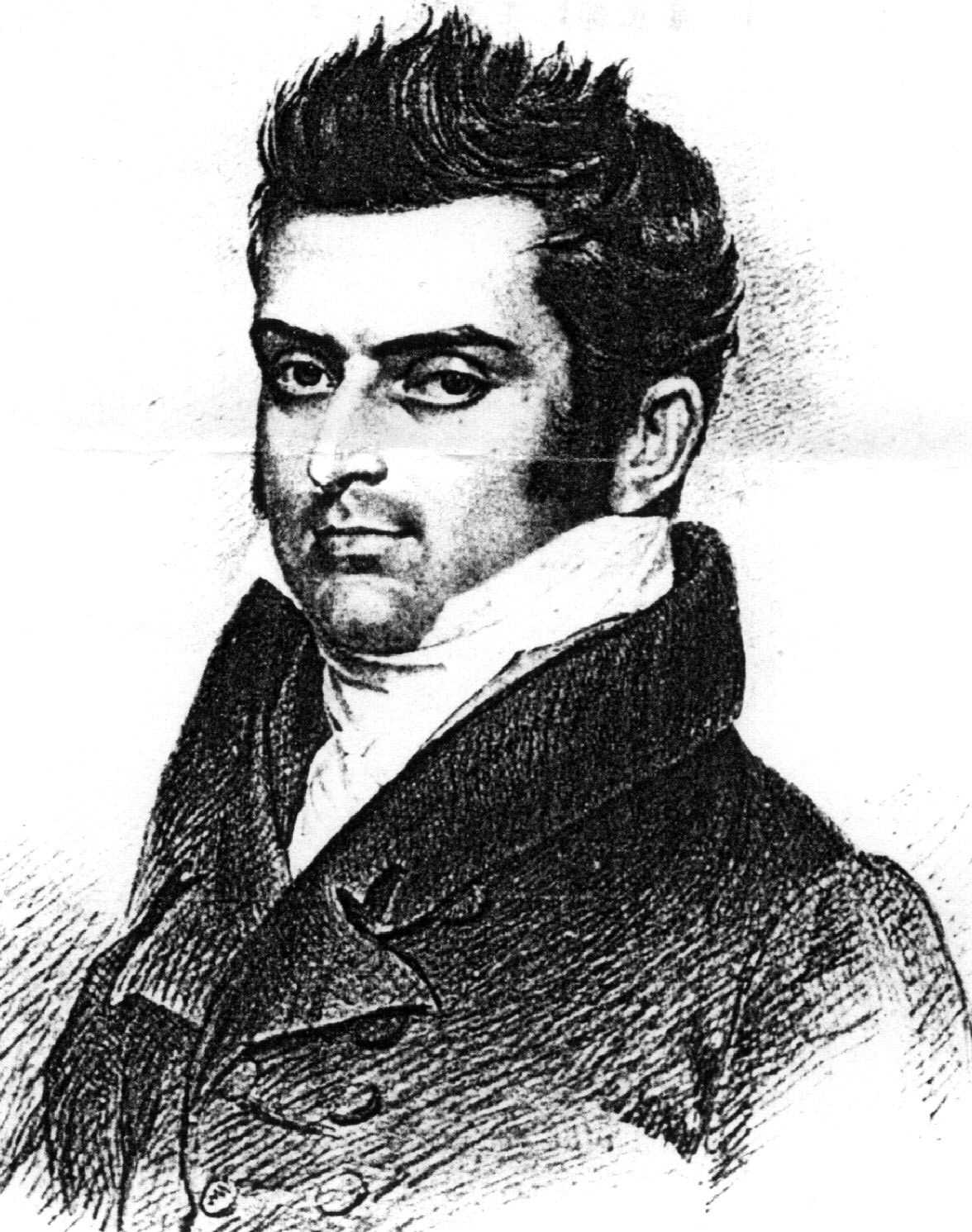

Chief Medical Officer and Naturalist of the British Embassy to China
- In office 1816–1817
- Monarch: George III

Personal details
- Born: 5 September 1780
- Died: 24 November 1826 (aged 46) Cawnpore, India
- Occupation: Surgeon, naturalist
- Known for: Accompanying Lord Amherst on his mission to China, being the first Western scientist to report the presence of the orangutan on the island of Sumatra

Clarke Abel (5 September 1780 – 24 November 1826) was a British surgeon and naturalist. The standard author abbreviation C. Abel is used to indicate this person as the author when citing a botanical name.

He accompanied Lord Amherst on his mission to China in 1816-17 as the embassy's chief medical officer and naturalist, on the recommendation of Sir Joseph Banks. En route, Abel landed twice in the Cape, where he devoted a chapter to the region's geology, and became notes a pioneer in South African Geology.This mission to China was Britain's second unsuccessful attempt to establish diplomatic relations with China and involved travelling to the Beijing and the famous botanical gardens of Fa Tee (Huadi) near Canton (Fangcun District). While in China, Abel collected specimens and seeds of the plant that carries his name, Abelia chinensis, described by Banks' botanical secretary Robert Brown, "with friendly partiality". However a shipwreck and an attack by pirates on the way back to his home in Britain caused him to lose all of his specimens. Abel's Narrative of a Journey in the Interior of China, 1818, gives a detailed account of the collection's misfortunes. However, he had left some specimens with Sir George Staunton at Canton, who was kind enough to return them to him; living specimens of the Chinese Abelia that we know today were introduced by Robert Fortune in 1844.

In March 1819 he was elected a Fellow of the Royal Society. He was also a member of the Geological Society.

Abel was the first Western scientist to report the presence of the orangutan on the island of Sumatra; the Sumatran Orangutan Pongo abelii Lesson 1827 is named for him. He went on to become the surgeon-in-chief to Lord Amherst when the earl was appointed Governor-general of India. Abel died at Cawnpore, India, 24 November 1826, aged 46.

Abel was also the first scientist to describe the Chiru or Tibetan Antelope, in 1826. It is the only member of the genus Pantholops.

In 1919, botanist Takenoshin Nakai published Abeliophyllum, which is a genus of shrubs from Korea, in the olive family, Oleaceae. It was named in Clarke Abel's honour. Then in 2010, Landrein published Diabelia, which is a genus of shrubs from China and Korea, in the Caprifoliaceae family.
