= Henry Ellis (diplomat) =

British diplomat and politician (1788–1855)

Sir Henry Ellis, KCB, PC (1 September 1788 – 28 September 1855) was a British diplomat and politician.

== Early life ==
Ellis was an illegitimate son of Robert Hobart, 4th Earl of Buckinghamshire.

== Career ==
In his career he served for six years in the civil service of the East India Company; and in the Bengal Presidency he held the post of private secretary to the president of the board of control. In 1814 he was sent to Persia as minister plenipotentiary ad interim, and returned from that country in the following year, having successfully negotiated a treaty of peace.

In 1816 Ellis accompanied William Pitt Amherst, 2nd Baron Amherst on his embassy to China, in the capacity of third commissioner. On their return from China in HMS Alceste, Amherst and Ellis were wrecked off Borneo. They were forced to make for Java in an open boat, and reached Batavia after a voyage of several hundred miles. They went back to rescue the other survivors, in the Indiaman Ternate. Ellis reported that an impression could be produced at Beijing only by a knowledge of the military strength of the United Kingdom.

Ellis's financial situation worsened after his father's death in 1816. He took a job as deputy colonial secretary in the Cape of Good Hope in 1819, and was elected Member of Parliament for Boston in 1820, as a Tory. The two positions proved incompatible, and after some delay his defeated opponent William Augustus Johnson had Ellis removed from parliament, in 1821.

Ellis was commissioner of customs 1824–25, clerk of the pells from 1825 until the abolition of the post in 1834, and commissioner of the board of control 1830–35. In 1831, He was also appointed to serve on the Government Commission upon Emigration, which was wound up in 1832.

In July 1835 Ellis was appointed ambassador to Persia, but gave up that appointment in November of the following year. He was despatched on a special mission to Brazil in August 1842, and at the close of 1848 he was appointed by the British government to attend the conference at Brussels on the affairs of Italy.

Ellis was made a privy councillor in 1832, and in 1848 was created a K.C.B. On his retirement from the diplomatic service he was awarded a pension of £1,400 per annum, together with a second pension for the abolished office of clerk of the pells. He died at Brighton, on 28 September 1855.

== Works ==
Ellis published in 1817 an authorised narrative of the journey and transactions of the Amherst embassy. In 1830 he issued a Series of Letters on the East India Question, addressed to the members of the two houses of parliament.

== Notes ==
Attribution

This article incorporates text from a publication now in the public domain: Stephen, Leslie, ed. (1889). "Ellis, Henry (1777–1855)". Dictionary of National Biography. Vol. 17. London: Smith, Elder & Co.

Diplomatic posts
Preceded by James Morier (ad interim)	Minister to Persia (ad interim); 1814–1815	Succeeded by ? (chargé d'affaires)
