= The Immobile Empire =

1989 book by Alain Peyrefitte

- Author: Alain Peyrefitte
- Publication date: 1989
- ISBN: 978-0345803955

The Immobile Empire is the English translation of L'empire Immobile, Ou, Le Choc Des Mondes: Récit Historique, a book of history published in French 1989 by the French politician and writer Alain Peyrefitte and translated into English in 1992. The book gives a sweeping narrative of the British Embassy of Sir George Macartney to the Qianlong Emperor of China in 1793. The book was translated into English, Chinese, Dutch, and Portuguese. Peyrefitte contends that the frustration of the mission and the stand-off in relations between Great Britain and China over diplomatic and audience ritual was caused by the ignorant intransigence and cultural conceit of the imperial court. The empire was "immobile" because these attitudes stifled China's natural creativity and kept it bureaucratic, static, and feeble over the following century and a half.

Peyrefitte used his official connections to gain access to archives in Beijing's Palace Museum and organized a team of researchers to explore them. They found documents concerning the mission, some of which had not been opened since the 1790s, and translated a collection of them.

== Reception and debate ==
The book was widely reviewed, and eventually came out in 36 editions between 1989 and 2007 in 7 languages. The reviews reflect larger controversies over China's traditional foreign relations and relations with the west over the last two centuries, particularly attitudes toward globalization and empire. Jane Kate Leonard, writing in The American Historical Review, was critical, concluding that the book was "a pretentious and undigested work of limited antiquarian interest". The review also contends that Peyrefitte's work does not add to earlier scholarship by J.L. Cranmer-Byng and Earl H. Pritchard. The University of Chicago historian James L. Hevia published a revisionist study which specifically argued that Peyrefitte and others of the "free trade" interpretation overemphasized economic motives and suggested instead that the British and the Manchu empires both were expanding and both were as much concerned with "ritual" (in the sense of cultural forms) as with profits as such. Princeton University scholar Benjamin A. Elman commented that Peyrefitte painted a "dark picture" of China and recommended that readers consult other works as a corrective.

== Editions ==
- Alain Peyrefitte, The Immobile Empire (New York: Knopf : Distributed by Random House, 1992 ISBN 0-394-58654-9) Google Books
- Alain Peyrefitte. L'empire Immobile, Ou, Le Choc Des Mondes: Récit Historique. Paris: Fayard, 1989. ISBN 2-213-02025-6, ISBN 978-2-213-02025-9.
- 停滯的帝國 Ting Zhi Di Di Guo (Taibei Shi: Feng yun shi dai chu ban gu fen you xian gong si, 1995).
- Guoqing Wang, tr.停滯的帝國 : 两个世界的撞击 (Ting Zhi Di Di Guo: Liang Ge Shi Jie De Zhuang Ji) (Beijing: SDX Joint Publishing Company, 1993, 2nd ed. 1997; 3rd ed. 2005).
- China en het Westen (Kampen: Kok-Agora, 1991).
- O Império Imóvel, Ou O Choque Dos Mundos. Lisboa: Gradiva, 1995. ISBN 972-35-0175-9, ISBN 978-972-35-0175-9, ISBN 9726624142, ISBN 9789726624141.
- The Collision of Two Civilisations: The British Expedition to China in 1792–4 (London: Harvill, 1993 ISBN 0-00-272677-7).
- Det Uforanderlige Kina Eller Mødet Mellem to Uforenelige Verdener ([Kbh.]: Forum, 1990 ISBN 87-553-1805-3).
- L'impero Immobile, Ovvero, Lo Scontro Dei Mondi. Milano: Longanesi, 1989. ISBN 88-304-0971-5, ISBN 978-88-304-0971-2.
