= Mukdengge =

Manchu name
- Manchu script: ᠮᡠᡴᡩᡝᠩᡤᡝ
- Möllendorff: mukdengge

Chinese name
- Chinese: 穆克登额
Transcriptions
Standard Mandarin
- Hanyu Pinyin: mù kè dēng'ē

Pronunciation respelling name
- Pronunciation respelling: MOOK-deng'ə

Mukdengge (1743–1829), a member of Gūwalgiya clan and Manchu Bordered Yellow Banner, served Ministers of Rites and Works in Jiaqing and Daoguang era.

== Biography ==
Mukdengge began his career as a bithesi (imperial ministry clerks) in 1768 and promoted through multiple imperial cabinet assistant positions. In 1820, he was appointed as Minister of Works, before being transferred shortly afterwards to the Ministry of Rites, where he served between two ministries through Jiaqing and the early reign of Daoguang Emperor. During this time, Mukdengge also served as the chief editor of Collective Rituals of Qing Dynasty by Imperial Order (欽定大清通禮) in 1824.
