= An Authentic Account of an Embassy from the King of Great Britain to the Emperor of China =

Official report on British Macartney Embassy to China (1792–1794)

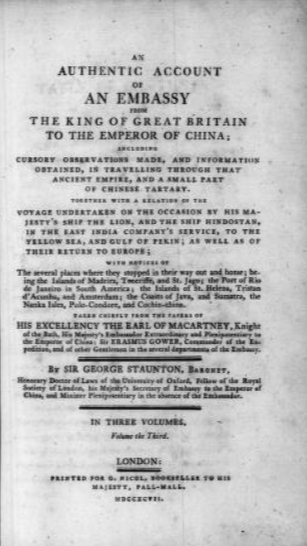
- Title page for An Authentic Account of an Embassy from the King of Great Britain to the Emperor of China (1797)
- Author: George Leonard Staunton
- Cover artist: William Alexander
- Language: English
- Subject: First British embassy to China
- Genre: Travel literature, official report
- Published: 1797
- Publisher: W.Bulmer & Co. for George Nicol
- Publication place: Great Britain

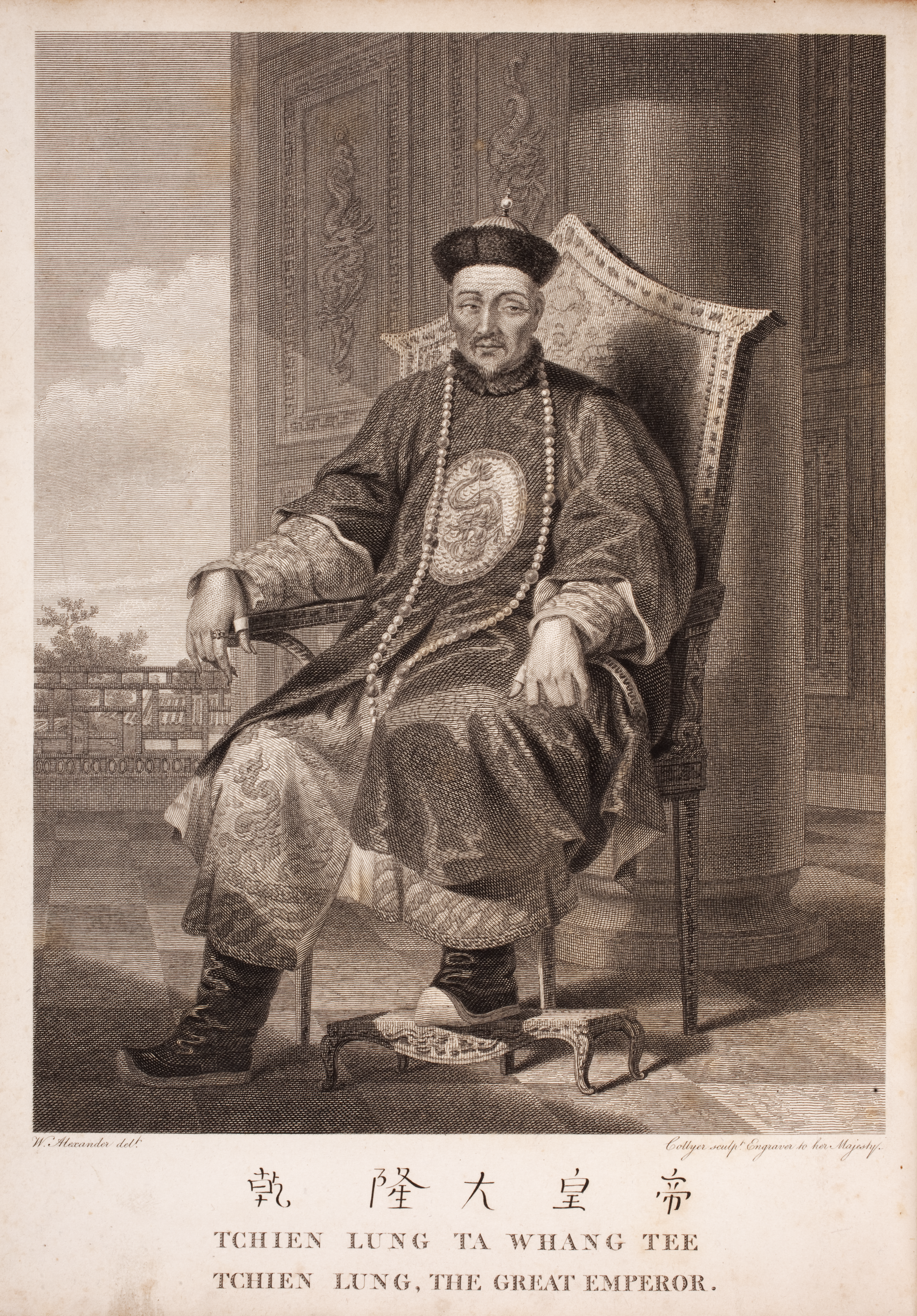
Engraving of the Qianlong Emperor, Volume One An Authentic Account (1797)

An Authentic Account of an Embassy from the King of Great Britain to the Emperor of China; Including Cursory Observations made, and Information obtained, in travelling through that Ancient Empire and a small part of Chinese Tartary (1797) is the official report on the British Macartney Embassy to Qing China that took place between 1792 and 1794. It was written after the return to England by the Secretary to the mission Sir George Leonard Staunton, 1st Baronet (1737-1801), based on his own observations and notes from other crewmembers, including his twelve-year-old son Sir George Thomas Staunton, 2nd Baronet. The official publisher to King George III, W.Bulmer & Co. for George Nicol published the account in 1797.

The account offers detailed insights into the British mercantile presence in China and as such makes it an important primary source for the historiography of Sino-Western relations. There is an academic dispute whether the account marks a sudden turning point in Sino-British relations or reflects a slow and complex divergence. While the political and economic ambitions of the embassy failed, the account by Staunton brought back detailed descriptions of and observations on the Chinese culture that were received with curiosity in the West and led to the commercial success of the book and the publication of several translations and subsequent writings on the Macartney Mission.

== Contents ==
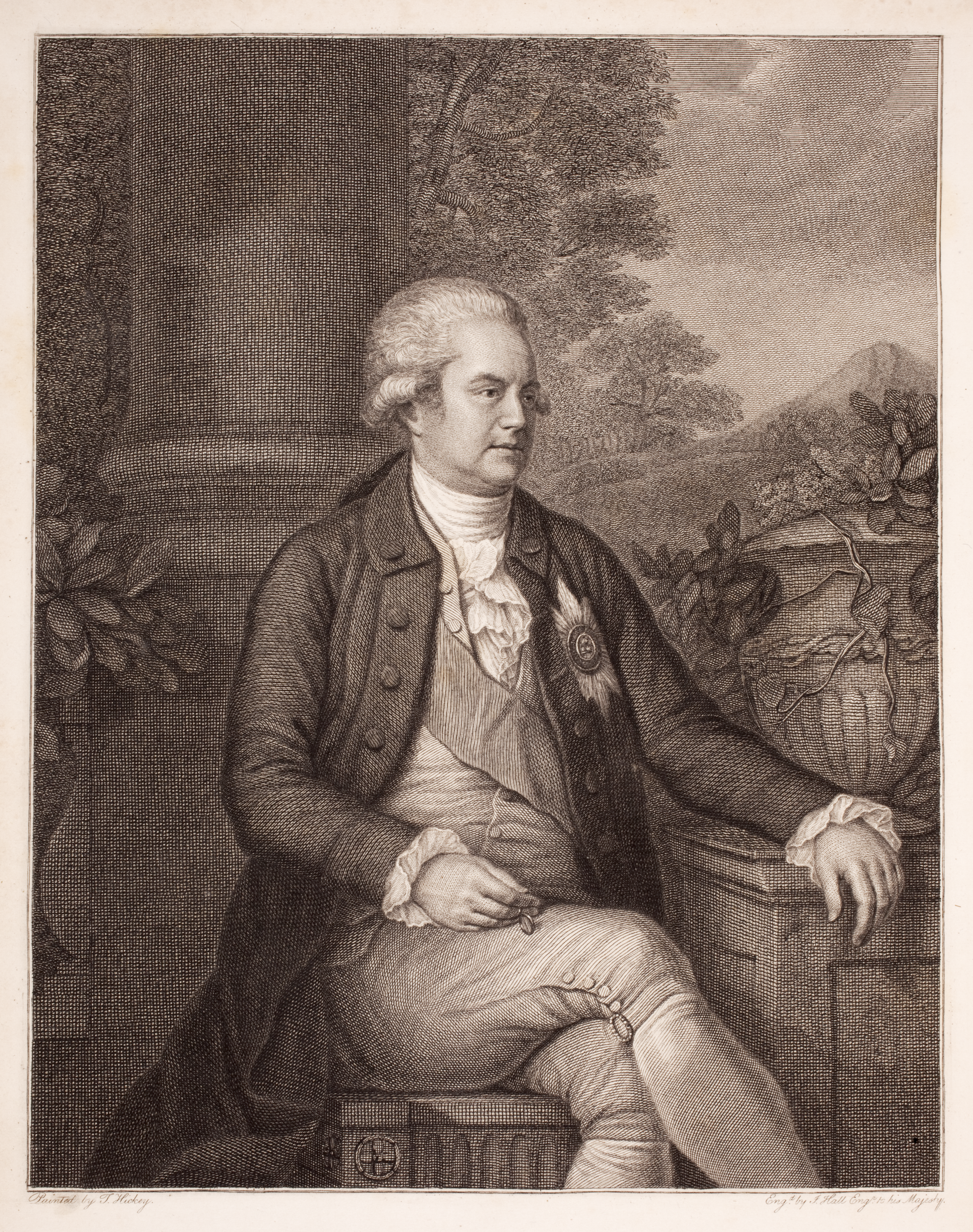
Engraving of Lord Macartney, Volume Two An Authentic Account (1797)

In the title of the account, the King of Great Britain is presented in superiority to the Emperor of China, King George III's name being printed in a dominating spaced type. Engravings printed next to the title pages of volumes 1 and 2 show the Qianlong Emperor and George Macartney, 1st Earl Macartney, respectively.

The general structure of the account follows the route of the mission and describes in a manner of neutral curiosity the experiences of the mission. The first two chapters of volume one cover the occasion of and the preparations for the embassy. The following eight chapters cover the passage to Madeira, Tenerife, St Jago, Rio de Janeiro, Java, Cochin-China, Ladrone Islands and through the Yellow Sea towards the river leading to Tien-Sing. The second volume follows the embassy within China along the River Pei-Ho, Tong-Choo-Foo, Peking, Great Wall of China, Chinese Tartary, Han-Choo-Foo, Canton and Macao.

The final audience of the Macartney Embassy in front of the Qianlong Emperor, and the dispute over the kowtow request are described in Chapter Four of the Second Volume. One of the most frequently quoted passages from the account, the kowtow incident gave rise to debate. When asked to kowtow to the Chinese Emperor, Lord Macartney requested that a Chinese man of similar status to himself should perform the traditional British courtesy to a painting of King George III. After the incident Staunton continues to describe the Embassy's experiences as positive throughout the entire account and concludes his account with an appreciative note:

The Embassador [sic] and other passengers landed, after an absence of near two years; during which time the former had the satisfaction of serving his country, in a situation both of much novelty and delicacy. The scenes and objects which the rest had an opportunity of observing, left a gratifying and durable impression upon the minds of many of them, beyond all the events of the former period of their lives.

== Publication history and translations ==
The account of 1797 consists of two quarto volumes containing text written by Staunton. The third, atlas, volume, printed in 1796 but not issued until 1798, has 28 engravings made by Painter William Alexander, based on his own first-hand observations during the mission and sketches made by Lieutenant Henry William Parish, as well as 16 maps and plans.

- Staunton, Sir George (1797). An authentic account of an embassy from the King of Great Britain to the Emperor of China: Including cursory observations made ... travelling through that ancient empire ... Taken chiefly from the papers of His Excellency the Earl of Macartney ... By Sir George Staunton ... Vol. 1. London: G. Nicol. OCLC 84759566 (all editions).
- id, volume 2
- id, volume 3

The atlas' plates were selected and arranged by the English botanist Joseph Banks who did not accompany the embassy. Thomas Medland later produced some figures for the folio volume after Alexander's examples.

A corrected second edition was printed in 1798 for George Nicol in two volumes.

The American edition was published in two volumes in 1799 in Philadelphia by John Bioren for Robert Campbell.

The English text was soon after its publication translated into various languages. The German version Reise der englischen Gesandtschaft an den Kaiser von China in den Jahren 1792 und 1793 was published in two volumes in Zürich by Geßner 1798–1799, translated by Johann Christian Hüttner. The translation holds no illustrations due to its small size and is the only version that admits being freely translated.

The Dutch translation Reis van lord Macartneij, naar China was published in Amsterdam by J. Allart 1798–1801 in seven volumes.

The French version Voyage dans l'intérieur de la Chine et en Tartarie fait dans les années 1792, 1793 et 1794 par lord Macartney was published in Paris by F. Buisson in 1804 in five volumes, including 37 plates and 4 engravings. It was translated by Jean Henri Castéra.

== Critical reception ==
=== Contemporary reactions ===
An Authentic Account was well received in an England whose great interest in China had been persisted since Jesuit travel writings. The Illustrator William Alexander published several books on the customs and dress of the Chinese based on the commercial success of his illustrations of the Macartney Mission. With the increasing demand for tea in Britain, pressures on trade and prosperity grew, causing British accounts on China to turn critical. Fellow crewmembers on the Macartney Mission, such as Sir John Barrow, 1st Baronet, published later reports describing the same Embassy in a negative light. This can be explained, in part, as a reaction to growing British frustrations over trade.

In the same year as publication of the Authentic Account, W. Bulmer & Co. also published an account by Serjeant-Major Samuel Holmes, under the title Holmes: The Journal of Mr Samuel Holmes, Searjeant-Major of the XIth Light Dragoons, During his Attendance, As one of the Guard on Lord Macartney's Embassy to china and Tartary.

== Modern debate ==
Interpretation of the Macartney Mission has conventionally pointed to a clash of civilisations and identifies the kowtow refusal by Macartney as a breaking point in Chinese-British relations. Influential historians favouring this interpretation are Alain Peyrefitte and J.L. Cranmer-Byng.

An apparently trivial incident that symbolized Macartney's failure: he refused to kowtow to the emperor...the ensuing conflict ignited a tragic chain reaction: the clash of two nations, the collapse of China, British domination of Southeast Asia in the nineteenth century, malevolent misunderstanding between the West and the Third World in the twentieth.

Other historians such as Joanna Waley-Cohen and Benjamin A. Elman argue for a more complex dynamic between England and China well into the 19th century. Kenneth Pomeranz refers to Staunton's account to highlight the economic similarities between China and the West and argues that the Chinese disadvantage of energy-generating resources and the European access to the New World caused the divergence between East and West rather than cultural miscommunication.

== General bibliography ==
- Gao, H. (2014). British-Chinese encounters: changing perceptions and attitudes from the Macartney mission to the Opium War (1792–1840) (Doctoral dissertation).
- Peyrefitte, A., & Rothschild, J. (2013). The immobile empire. New York: Vintage Books.
- Pomeranz, K. (2000). Great divergence: China, Europa and the making of the modern world economy. Princeton: Princeton University Press.
- Reed, M., & Demattè, P. (2011). China on paper: European and Chinese works from the late sixteenth to the early nineteenth century. Los Angeles: Getty Research Institute.
- Staunton, G. L. (1797). An Authentic Account of an Embassy from the King of Great Britain to the Emperor of China (in two volumes). London: W. Bulmer.
