= Johann Christian Hüttner =

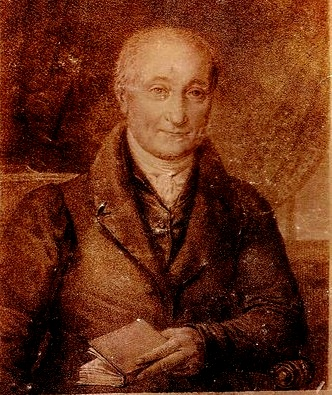
Johann Cristian Hüttner

Johann Christian Hüttner (25 May 1766 – 24 May 1847) was a German translator who settled in the United Kingdom.

== Life ==
Hüttner was born at Guben in Lusatia, Germany. He graduated from the University of Leipzig in 1791, and went to England, as tutor to George Thomas Staunton, son of Sir George Staunton, 1st Baronet. He went with his pupil to China in Lord Macartney's embassy, and was sometimes employed to write official letters in Latin.

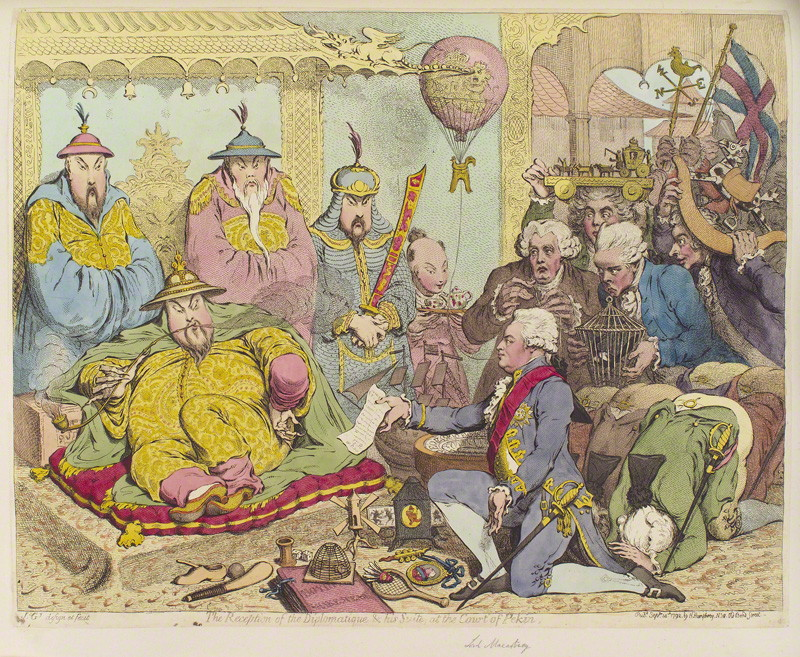
Gillray caricature of Johann Christian Hüttner translating at the Chinese court

In 1807 Hüttner was appointed as translator to the Foreign Office, after Charles Burney, pleased with details on Chinese music, lobbied George Canning. As such he translated from Spanish into German the appeal by Pedro Cevallos to the nations of Europe on Napoleon's invasion of Spain. He kept up relations with Germany, and acted as literary agent to the Grand Duke of Saxe-Weimar.

Hüttner's death, after a street accident, took place on 24 May 1847, at Fludyer Street, Westminster.

== Works ==
Hüttner sent accounts of experiences in China to friends in Germany. A copy of them was sold to a Leipzig bookseller, and friends brought out an authentic text, which appeared at Berlin in 1797, entitled Nachricht von der brittischen Gesandtschaftsreise durch China und einen Theil der Tartarei. The work anticipated the official account. French translations were published in 1799 and 1804.

Other works were:

- De Mythis Platonis, Leipzig, 1788;
- Hindu Gesetzbuch oder Menu's Verordnungen, an edited translation of Sir William Jones's English translation of the Laws of Manu from the Sanskrit, Weimar, 1797;
- Englische Miscellen herausgegeben (Bd. 5-25), Tübingen, 1800 and onwards;
- An edition, with German notes, of James Townley's farce High Life Below Stairs, Tübingen, 1802.

He also contributed to German encyclopedias and periodicals.

== Family ==
Hüttner was twice married, but left no issue.

== Notes ==
Attribution

This article incorporates text from a publication now in the public domain: Lee, Sidney, ed. (1891). "Hüttner, Johann Christian". Dictionary of National Biography. Vol. 28. London: Smith, Elder & Co.
