= Thomas Medland =

English engraver and draughtsman

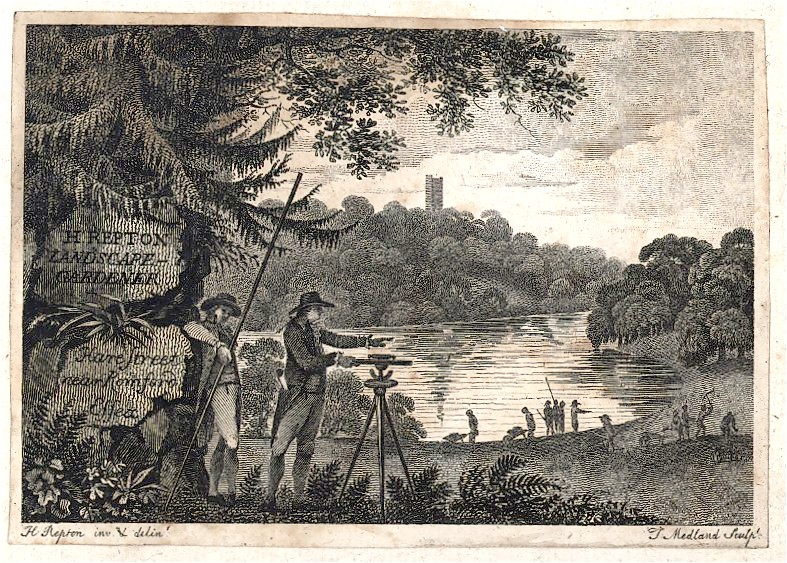
Business card for Humphry Repton (1752–1818)

Thomas Medland (c.1765 – 1833) was an English engraver and draughtsman. He was drawing-master at Haileybury College and exhibited at the Royal Academy. He illustrated numerous works during his lifetime and was landscape engraver to the Prince of Wales.

== Life ==
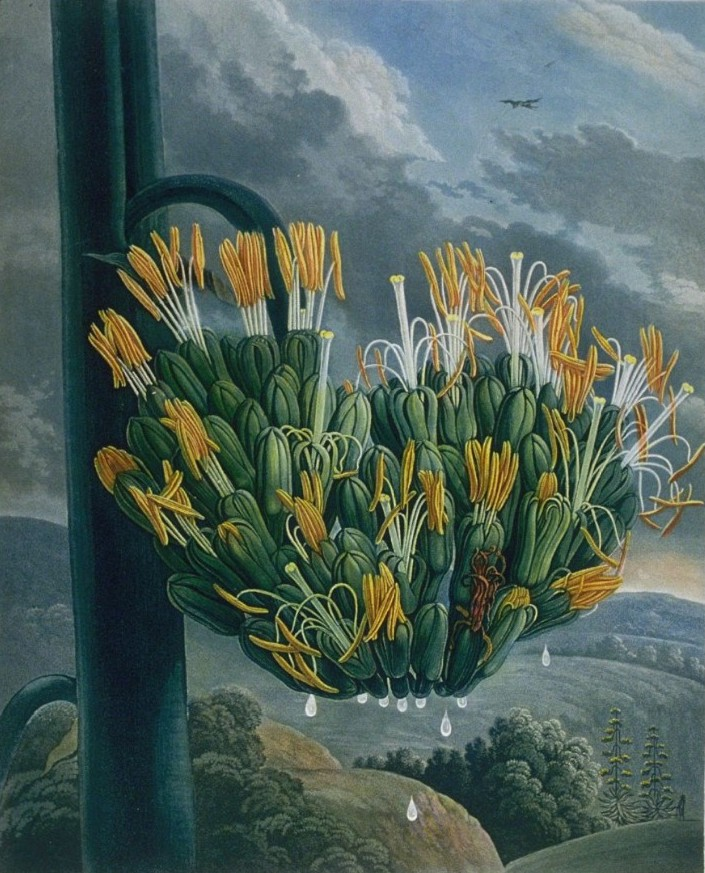
Agave americana Temple of Flora 1799

Medland lived in London for many years, practising both line engraving and in aquatint. He was known for landscape work, and was mainly employed on topographical plates. When Haileybury College was founded by the East India Company in 1806, Medland was appointed drawing-master there, and from that time lived in the neighbourhood of Hertford. He died at Hertford 30 October 1833.

== Works ==
Medland engraved plates for:

- Joseph Farington, Views of the Lakes in Cumberland and Westmoreland (1789), and Cities and Castles of England (1791)
- Silvester Harding, Shakspeare Illustrated (1793)
- The Copperplate Magazine
- Sir George Leonard Staunton, Embassy of the Earl of Macartney to China (1797)
- Select Views in London and Westminster (1800)
- Sir William Gell, Topography of Troy (1804)

Medland was successful with a set of illustrations to Robinson Crusoe from designs by Thomas Stothard (1790). His largest plate was Evening of the Glorious First of June, after Robert Cleveley. Among his aquatints were the series of nineteen plates of Egyptian monuments in the British Museum, after William Alexander (1807), and those in Charles Gold's Oriental Drawings (1806).

Medland also practised water-colour painting, and exhibited views of London at the Royal Academy in 1777 and 1779, and later many English scenes. He continued to show drawings at the Royal Academy until 1822.
