= Liang Kentang =

Chinese official

Liang Kentang (梁肯堂,1717-1801) was a Chinese official during the Qing Dynasty.

Liang was born in Hangzhou, Zhejiang province. In 1756, he succeeded in the provincial exam and obtained the Juren title.

He was nominated Viceroy of Zhili in 1790. On 6 August 1793, he met Macartney and Staunton of the British Macartney Embassy during the British diplomatic mission in China.
