= Erasmus Gower =

Royal Navy officer and colonial administrator (1742–1814)

Admiral Sir Erasmus Gower
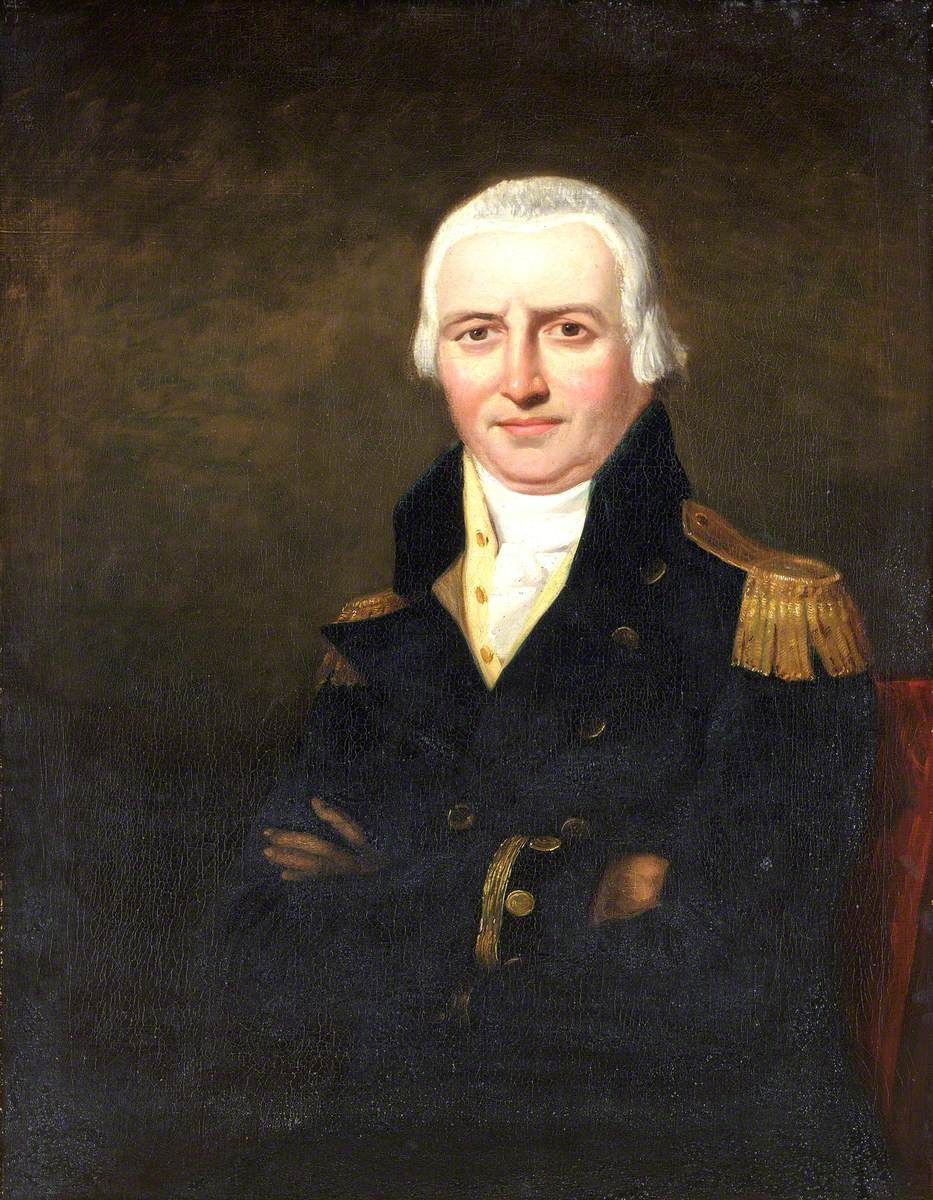
- Portrait by Richard Livesay, c. 1799
- Born: 3 December 1742; Cilgerran, Wales
- Died: 21 June 1814 (aged 71); Hambledon, Hampshire
- Military career
- Allegiance: Great Britain; United Kingdom
- Branch: Royal Navy
- Service years: 1755–1814
- Rank: Admiral of the White
- Commands: HMS Prince William; HMS Enterprise; HMS Porcupine; HMS Edgar; HMS Medea; HMS Salisbury; HMS Canada; HMS Lion; Macartney embassy to China; HMS Triumph; HMS Neptune; Commodore of Thames River; HMS Princess Royal; HMS Isis; Commodore-Governor of Newfoundland
- Conflicts: Seven Years' War: Battle of Quiberon Bay; Capture of Belle Île; American Revolutionary War: Battle of Cape St. Vincent (1780); Great Siege of Gibraltar; Battle of Cuddalore (1783); French Revolutionary Wars: Cornwallis's Retreat
- Awards: Knight Bachelor

Viceregal styles of Sir Erasmus Gower
- Reference style: His Excellency
- Spoken style: Your Excellency

Admiral of the White Sir Erasmus Gower (3 December 1742 – 21 June 1814) was a Royal Navy officer and colonial administrator.

== Naval career ==
Gower, aged 13, joined the Royal Navy in 1755 under the patronage of his uncle, Captain John Donkley. He was present at the Battle of Quiberon Bay under Admiral Edward Hawke, 1st Baron Hawke and served under Byron's command on HMS Dolphin from 1764 to 1766. He was promoted to lieutenant, serving with distinction under Commander Philip Carteret from 1766 to 1769. He then served in the Falkland Islands, West Indies, Mediterranean, the East and Newfoundland until 1792, when he declined a baronetcy and was knighted.

In 1792, Gower was named Commander of the first British diplomatic mission to imperial China and sailed in the 64-gun HMS Lion. This expedition was headed by Lord George Macartney. They were also accompanied by East Indiaman Hindostan, chartered from the East India Company for the mission. Although the Macartney Embassy returned to London without obtaining any concession from China, the mission could have been termed a success because it brought back detailed observations. Gower had planned a secret visit to Japan, the Philippines and Celebes while Macartney was in China but was frustrated by adverse weather conditions and lack of essential medical supplies.

George Staunton, Secretary to the Embassy, was charged with producing the official account of the expedition after their return. This multi-volume work was taken chiefly from the papers of Lord Macartney and from the papers of Commander Gower. Sir Joseph Banks, the President of the Royal Society, was responsible for selecting and arranging engraving of the illustrations in this official record.

Soon after returning from China, Gower, in the 74-gun Triumph played an important role in Cornwallis's Retreat when the small squadron under Vice-Admiral Sir William Cornwallis escaped from a French fleet of superior numbers. Cornwallis later wrote The steady conduct of the Triumph was admirable – Sir Erasmus Gower treated the scattered fire of the Enemy with the utmost contempt, and by firing single well directed Guns, the Enemy’s Ships were deterred from approaching.

During the devastating Spithead and Nore mutinies in 1797 Gower was given command a fleet in the upper Thames River to oppose the more than 10,000 strong mutineers it was thought would move up river from the Nore and attack London. At the end of the mutiny he sat on the courts martial which tried over 400 men.

== Admiral and commodore-governor ==
Gower was promoted to Rear-Admiral of the White in February 1799 and hoisted his flag in HMS Princess Royal in the Channel Fleet and Ireland, with his protege David Atkins as flag captain. In 1804, he was promoted to Vice-Admiral of the White and appointed governor of Newfoundland. Gower Street in St. John's is named in his honour. In late 1804, Gower sent the hired cutter Queen Charlotte, under a Lieutenant Morrison, to Labrador to investigate reports of an influx of American fishing boats. As a result of the report, the Admiralty decided to station a sloop in the fishing waters to chase off the Americans.

Noted as a meticulous administrator, he was promoted to Admiral of the White in 1810 and died at his home near Hambledon, Hampshire in 1814. His recent biographer has claimed – No other contemporary officer approached his accumulated experience.

== See also ==
- Governors of Newfoundland
- List of people of Newfoundland and Labrador

== Notes ==
Political offices
Preceded by James Gambier	Commodore Governor of Newfoundland; 1804–1806	Succeeded by John Holloway
