= Staunton baronets =

Extinct baronetcy in the Baronetage of Ireland

- Escutcheon of the Staunton baronets of Cargins
- Creation date: 1785
- Status: extinct
- Extinction date: 1859
- Seat: Leigh Park

The Staunton Baronetcy, of Cargins in the County of Galway, was a title in the Baronetage of Ireland. It was created on 31 October 1785 for the Irish botanist George Staunton. He was succeeded by his son, Sir George Staunton, the second Baronet. He was a traveller, orientalist and politician. The title became extinct on his death in 1859.

== Staunton baronets, of Cargins (1785) ==
- Sir George Leonard Staunton, 1st Baronet (1737–1801)
- Sir George Thomas Staunton, 2nd Baronet (1781–1859)
