= Hugh Gillan =

Scottish physician (died 1798)

Hugh Gillan (died 19 May 1798) was a Scottish physician. He was born in Scotland, and became a doctor of medicine of University of Edinburgh in 1786. He joined the 1793 Macartney Embassy to China as a physician. The embassy was led by George Macartney, 1st Earl Macartney.

== Honors ==
Gillan was admitted a Licentiate of the Royal College of Physicians in 1795, and became a fellow of the Royal Society in the same year.
