= William Alexander (painter) =

English painter, illustrator and engraver

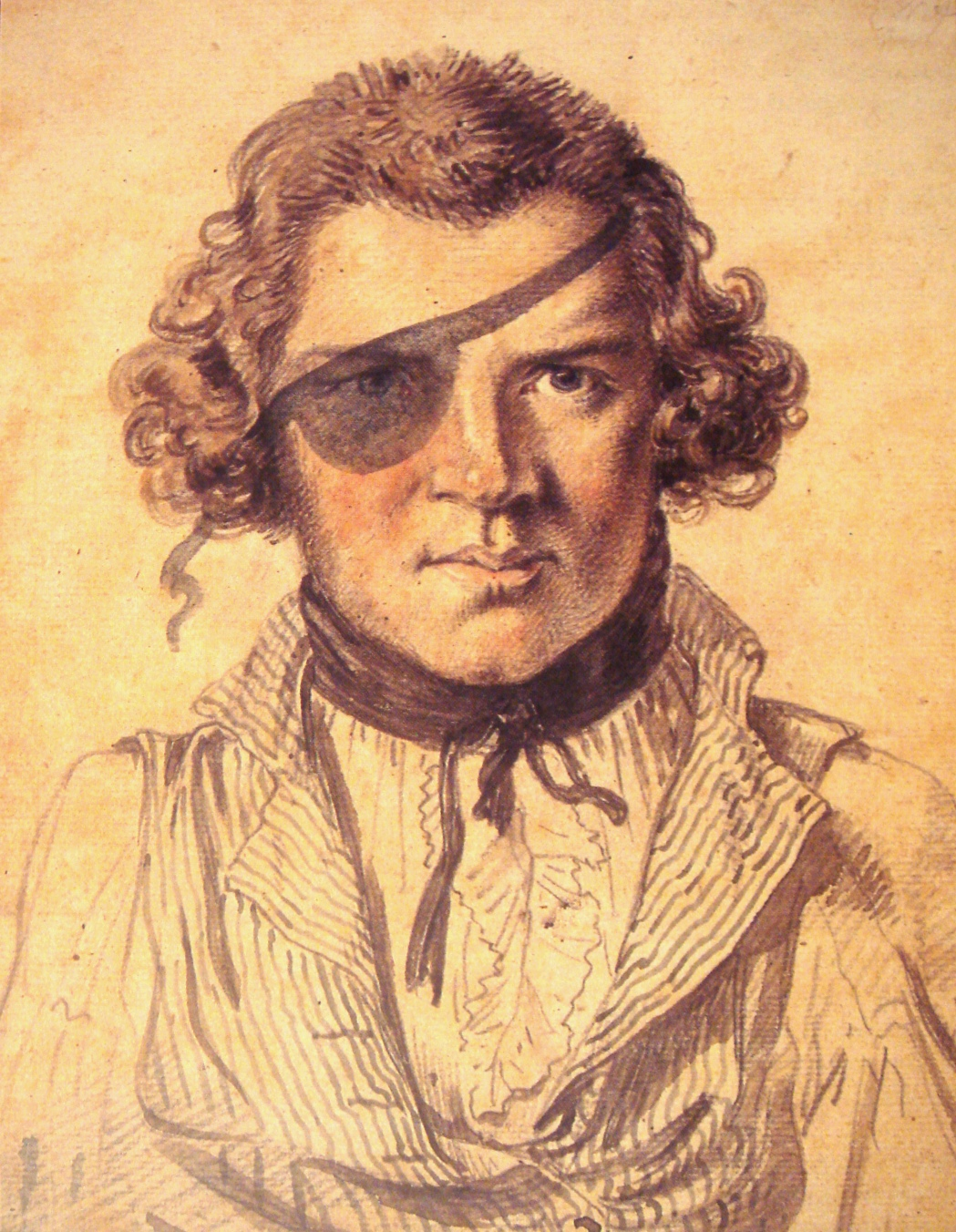
Self-portrait, 1793

William Alexander (10 April 1767 – 23 July 1816) was an English painter, illustrator and engraver. The hallmarks of his work, usually executed in watercolours, were clearness and harmony of colour, simplicity and taste in composition, grace of outline, and delicacy of execution. He accompanied the Macartney Embassy to China in 1792. Prints of his work were reproduced from engravings. One of his works was used to illustrate Cadell & Davies' Britannia depicta.

== Life and works ==
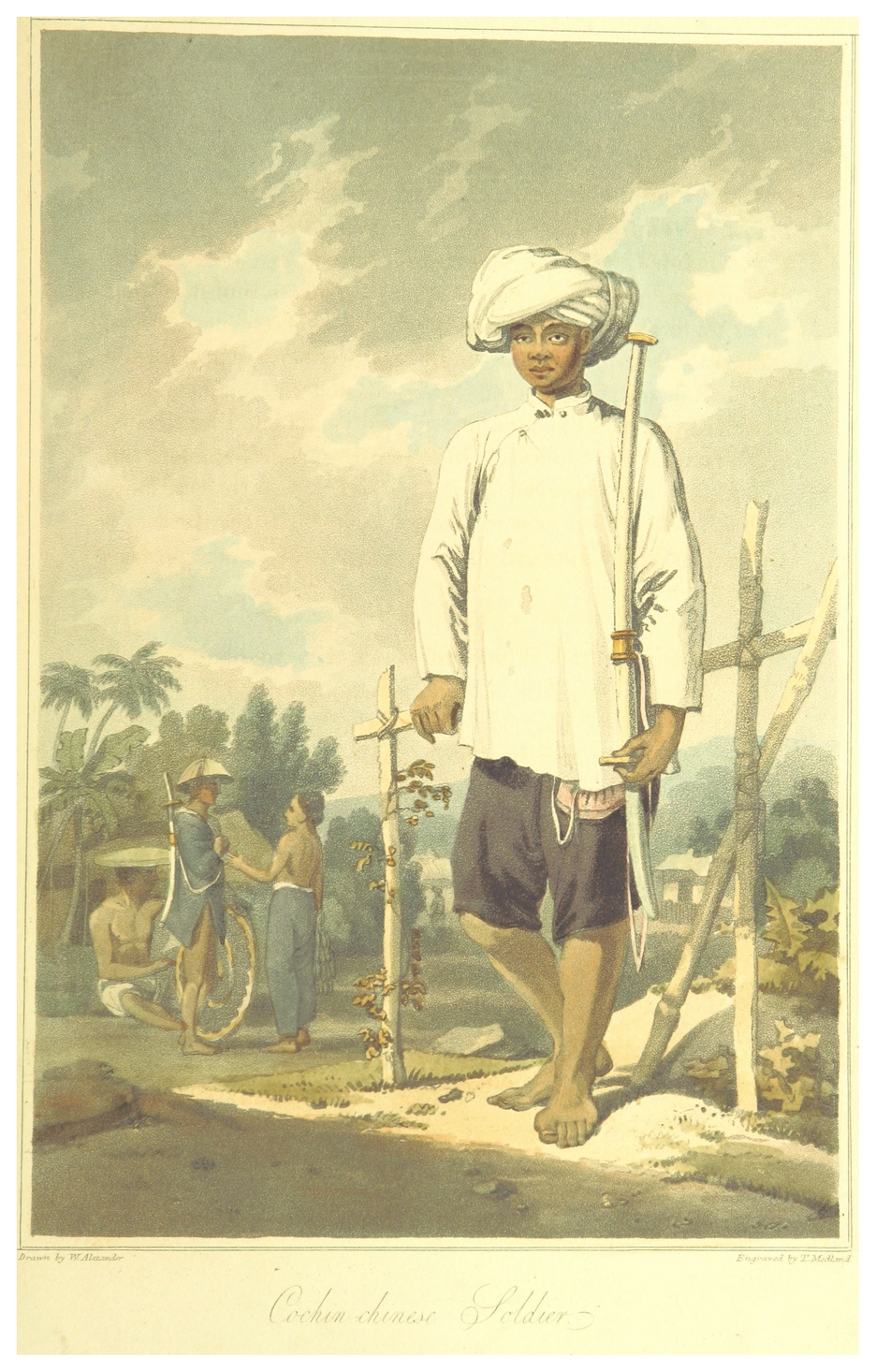
A soldier of the Tây Sơn dynasty in 1793

Alexander was born in Maidstone, Kent, the son of Harry Alexander, a coachmaker. He was educated at Maidstone Grammar School, but in 1782, at the age of 15, moved to London to study art - first under William Pars, and subsequently Julius Caesar Ibbetson. In February 1784, he was admitted to the Royal Academy Schools. He assiduously applied himself to the mastery of his profession, obtaining the notice and approbation of Sir Joshua Reynolds.

In 1792, he was appointed as one of the draughtsmen to the Macartney Embassy to China. He accompanied the Earl of Macartney to Peking where he made drawings for the plates which accompanied Sir George Staunton's account of the embassy (published in 1797). In 1794 he returned to England and married Jane Wogan the following year. She died soon afterwards.

His other principal works were: "Views of Headlands, Islands, etc. taken during the Voyage to China" (1798); drawings based on Daniells' sketches, for Vancouver's Voyage to the North Pacific Ocean (1798); and the descriptive plates to Sir John Barrow's Travels in China (1804), and Voyage to Cochin China (1806). In 1805 he published "The Costume of China", illustrated by 48 coloured engravings. The work was so well-received that in 1814 he published another book titled Picturesque Representations of the Dress and Manners of the Chinese, illustrated in fifty colored engravings, with descriptions.

Besides his works as a draughtsman, he made several engravings - the principal one of which is a representation of the Festival given by the Earl of Romney to the Kentish Volunteers, on 1 August 1799, from his own drawing.

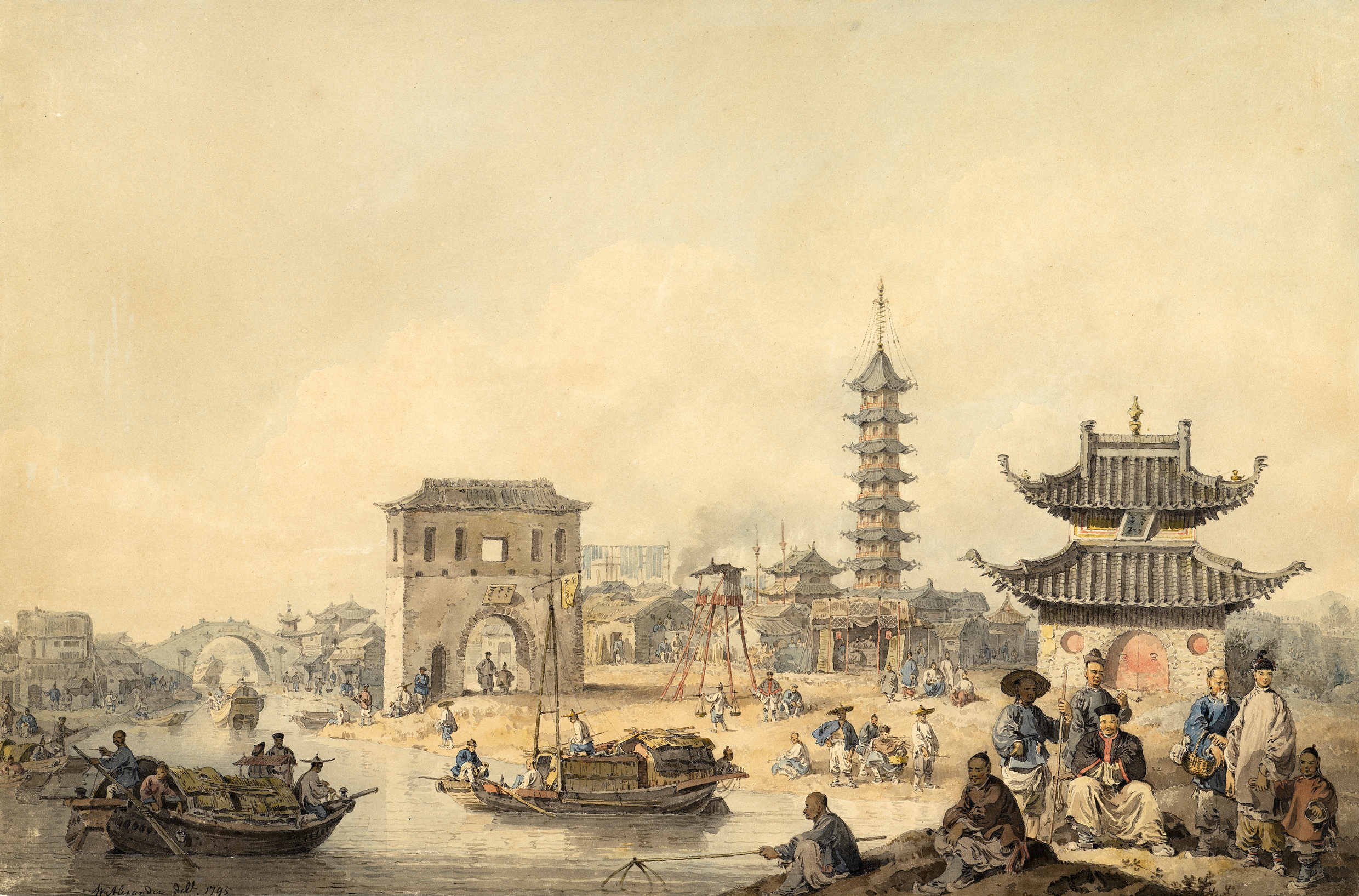
View of the Suburbs of a Chinese City (1795)

In 1802, Alexander was appointed professor of drawing at the Military College at Great Marlow, resigning in May 1808 to take up the post of assistant keeper of antiquities in the British Museum. In the years 1810, 1812, and 1815, he made drawings of the terra cottas and marbles in the Museum which were engraved and published in three volumes - the accompanying text being provided by Taylor Combe (keeper of the Department of Antiquities). Alexander had completed drawings for a fourth volume before his death.

He died at the house of his uncle in Maidstone in July 1816, and was buried in Boxley churchyard. He was described in one of his obituaries as "a man of mild and unassuming manners, rich in the knowledge of art, and of unsullied integrity."

In honour of his artistic accomplishments, an exhibition titled "William Alexander: An English Painter in Imperial China" was held at the Royal Pavilion Art Gallery and Museum, Brighton from 8 September to 25 October, 1981 and at the Nottingham Art Gallery from 23 November to 17 December 1981.
