= Macartney Embassy =

First British diplomatic mission to China (1793)

- Traditional Chinese: 馬加爾尼使團
- Simplified Chinese: 马加尔尼使团
Transcriptions
Standard Mandarin
- Hanyu Pinyin: Mǎjiā'ěrní Shǐtuán
Yue: Cantonese
- Jyutping: Maa5gaa1ji5nei4 Si3tyun4

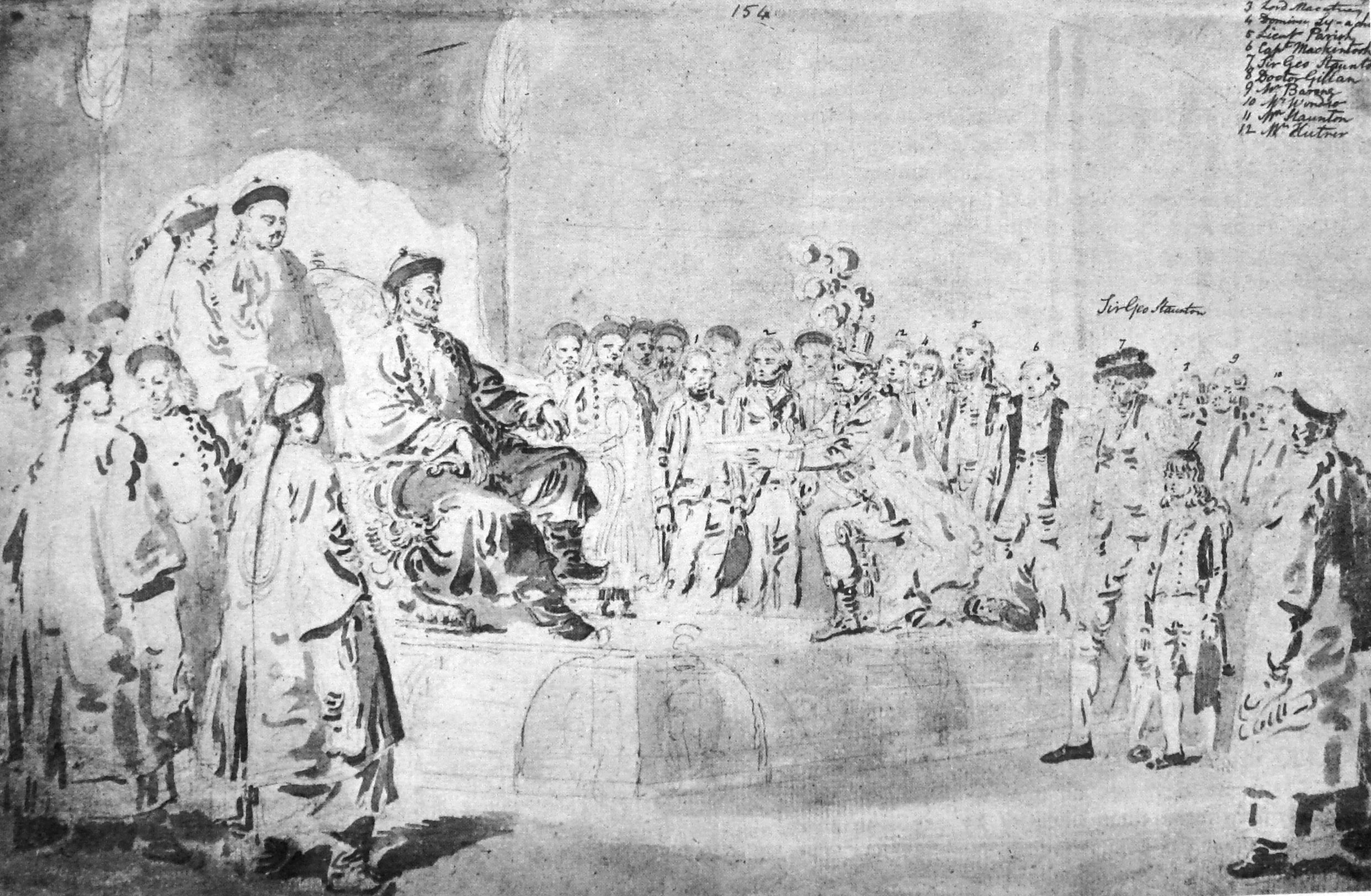
Lord Macartney's embassy, 1793

The Macartney Embassy (Chinese: 馬加爾尼使團), also called the Macartney Mission, was the first British diplomatic mission to China, which took place in 1793. It is named for its leader, Viscount Macartney, Great Britain's first envoy to China. The goals of the mission included the opening of new ports for British trade in China, the establishment of a permanent embassy in Beijing, the cession of a small island for British use along China's coast, and the relaxation of trade restrictions on British merchants in Guangzhou (Canton). Macartney's delegation met with the Qianlong Emperor, who rejected all of the mission's requests. Although the mission failed to achieve its official objectives, it was later noted for the extensive cultural, political, and geographical observations its participants recorded in China and brought back to Europe. It came to light in 1796 that a Chinese court official, Heshen, was embezzling state funds and had frustrated the mission.

== Background ==
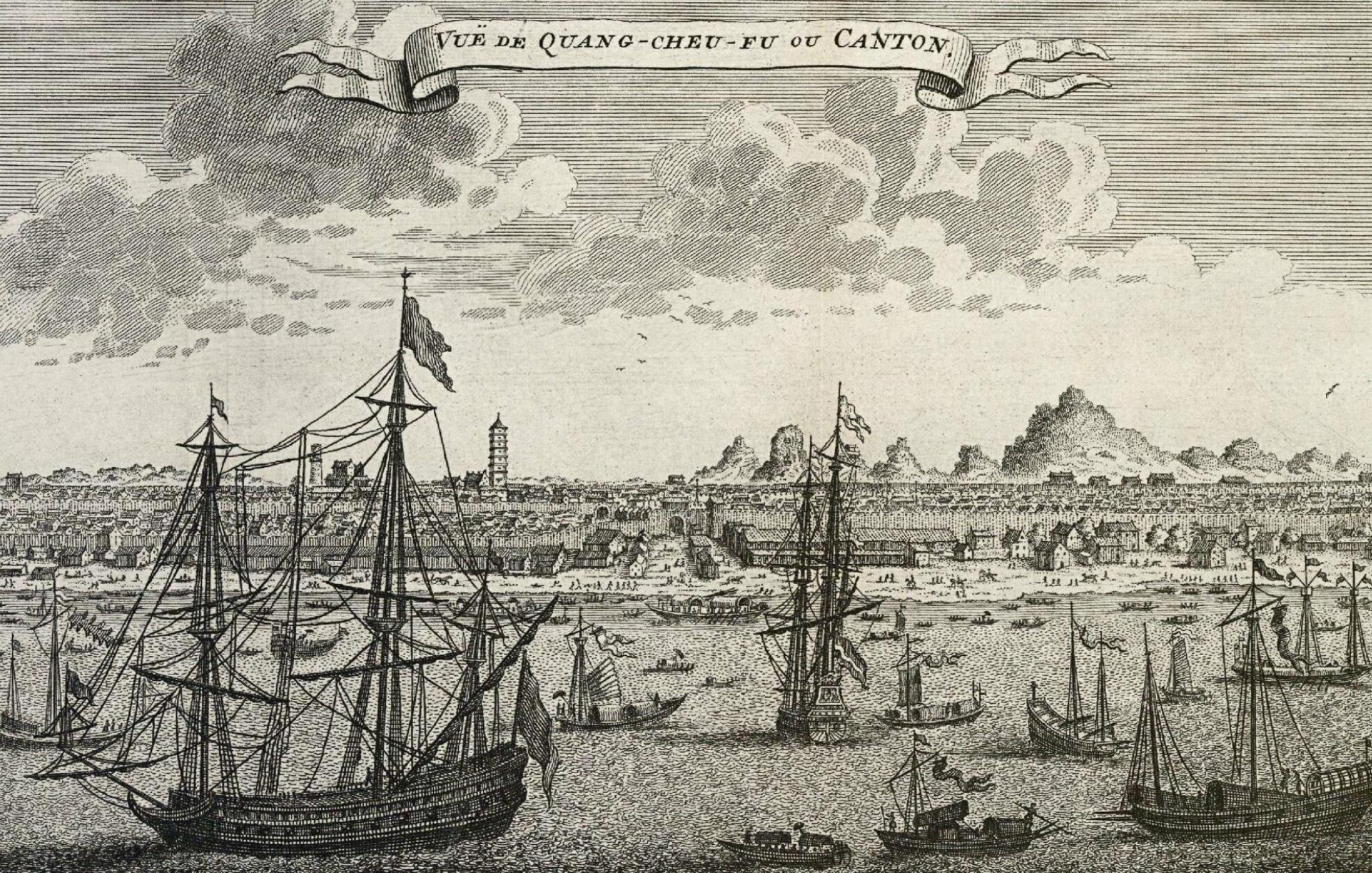
1749 illustration of Canton

Foreign maritime trade in China was regulated through the Canton System, which emerged gradually through a series of imperial edicts in the 17th and 18th centuries. This system channeled formal trade through the Cohong, a guild of thirteen trading companies (known in Cantonese as "hong") selected by the imperial government. In 1725, the Yongzheng Emperor gave the Cohong legal responsibility over commerce in Guangzhou. By the 18th century, Guangzhou, known as Canton to British merchants at the time, had become the most active port in the China trade, thanks partly to its convenient access to the Pearl River Delta. In 1757, the Qianlong Emperor confined all foreign maritime trade to Guangzhou. Qianlong, who ruled the Qing dynasty at its zenith, was wary of the transformations of Chinese society that might result from unrestricted foreign access. Chinese subjects were not permitted to teach the Chinese language to foreigners, and European traders were forbidden to bring women into China.

By the late 18th century, British traders felt confined by the Canton System and, in an attempt to gain greater trade rights, they lobbied for an embassy to go before the emperor and request changes to the current arrangements. The need for an embassy was partly due to the growing trade imbalance between China and Great Britain, driven largely by the British demand for tea, as well as other Chinese products like porcelain and silk. The East India Company, whose trade monopoly in the East encompassed the tea trade, was obliged by the Qing government to pay for Chinese tea with silver. To address the trade deficit, efforts were made to find British products that could be sold to the Chinese.

At the time of Macartney's mission to China, the East India Company was beginning to grow opium in India to sell in China. The company made a concerted effort starting in the 1780s to finance the tea trade with opium. Macartney, who had served in India as Governor of Madras (present-day Chennai), was ambivalent about selling the drug to the Chinese, preferring to substitute "rice or any better production in its place". An official embassy would provide an opportunity to introduce new British products to the Chinese market, which the East India Company had been criticised for failing to do.

In 1787, Prime Minister William Pitt the Younger and East India Company official Henry Dundas dispatched Colonel Charles Cathcart to serve as Britain's first ambassador to China. Cathcart became ill during the voyage, however, and died just before his ship, HMS Vestal, reached China. After the failure of the Cathcart Embassy, Macartney proposed that another attempt be made under his friend Sir George Staunton. Dundas, who had become Home Secretary, suggested in 1791 that Macartney himself take up the mission instead. Macartney accepted on the condition that he would be made an earl, and given the authority to choose his companions.

== Preparations ==
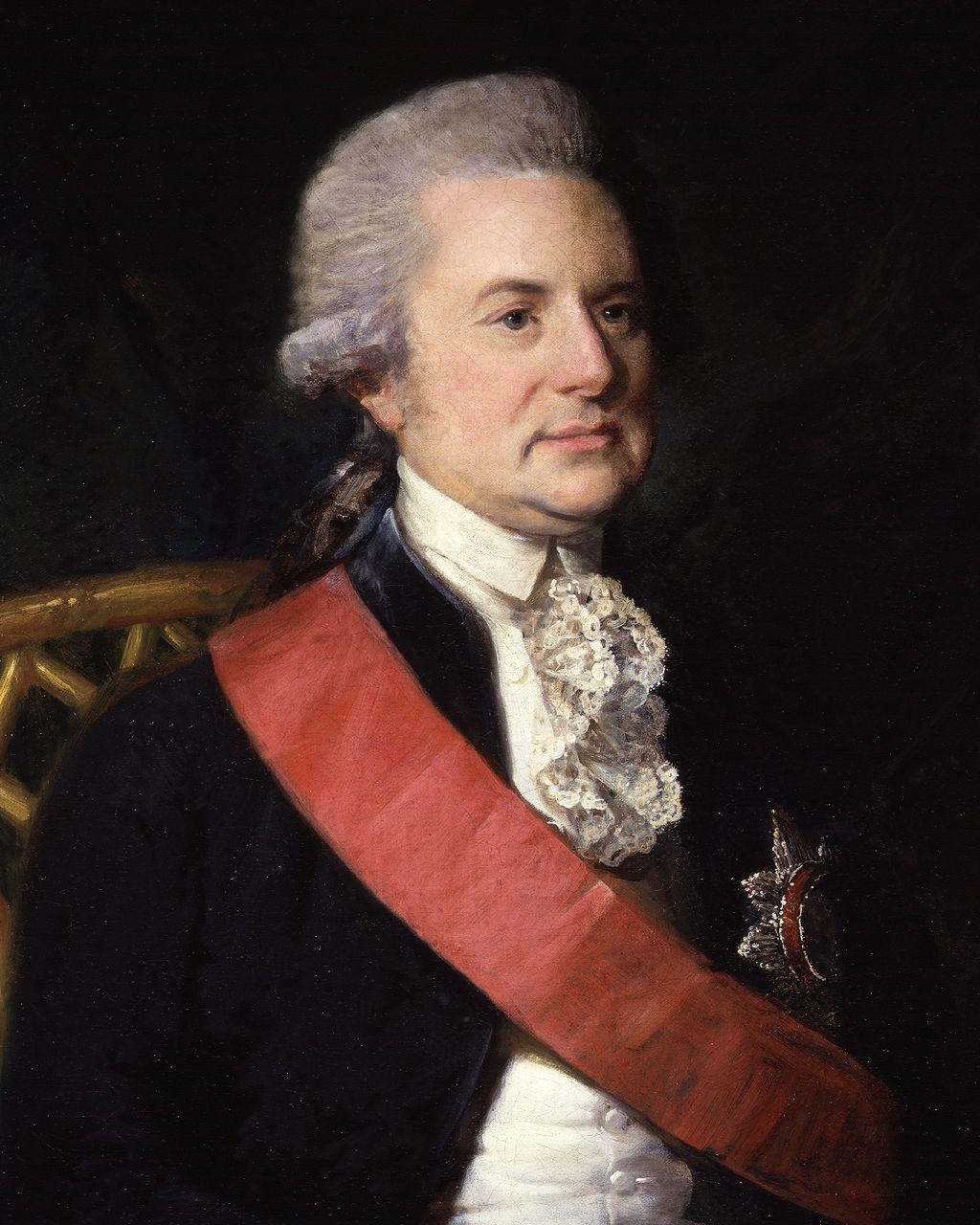
George Macartney, 1st Earl Macartney

Macartney chose George Staunton as his right-hand man, whom he entrusted to continue the mission should Macartney himself prove unable to do so. Staunton brought along his son, Thomas, who served the mission as a page. John Barrow (later Sir John Barrow, 1st Baronet) served as the embassy's comptroller. Joining the mission were two doctors (Hugh Gillan and William Scott), two secretaries, three attachés, and a military escort. Artists William Alexander and Thomas Hickey would produce drawings and paintings of the mission's events. A group of scientists also accompanied the embassy, led by James Dinwiddie.

It was difficult for Macartney to find anyone in Britain who could speak Chinese because it was illegal for Chinese people to teach foreigners. Chinese who taught foreigners their language risked death, as was the case with the teacher of James Flint, a merchant who broke protocol by complaining directly to Qianlong about corrupt officials in Canton. Macartney did not want to rely on native interpreters, as was the custom in Canton. The mission brought along four Chinese Catholic priests as interpreters. Two were from the Collegium Sinicum in Naples, where George Staunton had recruited them: Paolo Cho (周保羅) and Jacobus Li (李雅各; 李自標; Li Zibiao). They were familiar with Latin, but not English. The other two were priests at the Pontificio Collegio Urbano de Propaganda Fide, which trained Chinese boys brought home by missionaries in Christianity. The two wanted to return home to China, to whom Staunton offered free passage to Macau. The 100-member delegation also included scholars and valets.

Among those who had called for a mission to China was Sir Joseph Banks, 1st Baronet, President of the Royal Society. Banks had been the botanist on board HMS Endeavour for the first voyage of Captain James Cook, as well as the driving force behind the 1787 expedition of HMS Bounty to Tahiti. Banks, who had been growing tea plants privately since 1780, had ambitions to gather valuable plants from all over the world to be studied at the Royal Botanic Gardens at Kew and the newly established Calcutta Botanical Garden in Bengal. Above all, he wanted to grow tea in Bengal or Assam, and address the "immense debt of silver" caused by the tea trade. At this time, botanists were not yet aware that a variety of the tea plant (camellia sinensis var. assamica) was already growing natively in Assam, a fact that Robert Bruce was to discover in 1823. Banks advised the embassy to gather as many plants as possible in their travels, especially tea plants. He also insisted that gardeners and artists be present on the expedition to make observations and illustrations of local flora. Accordingly, David Stronach and John Haxton served as the embassy's botanical gardeners.

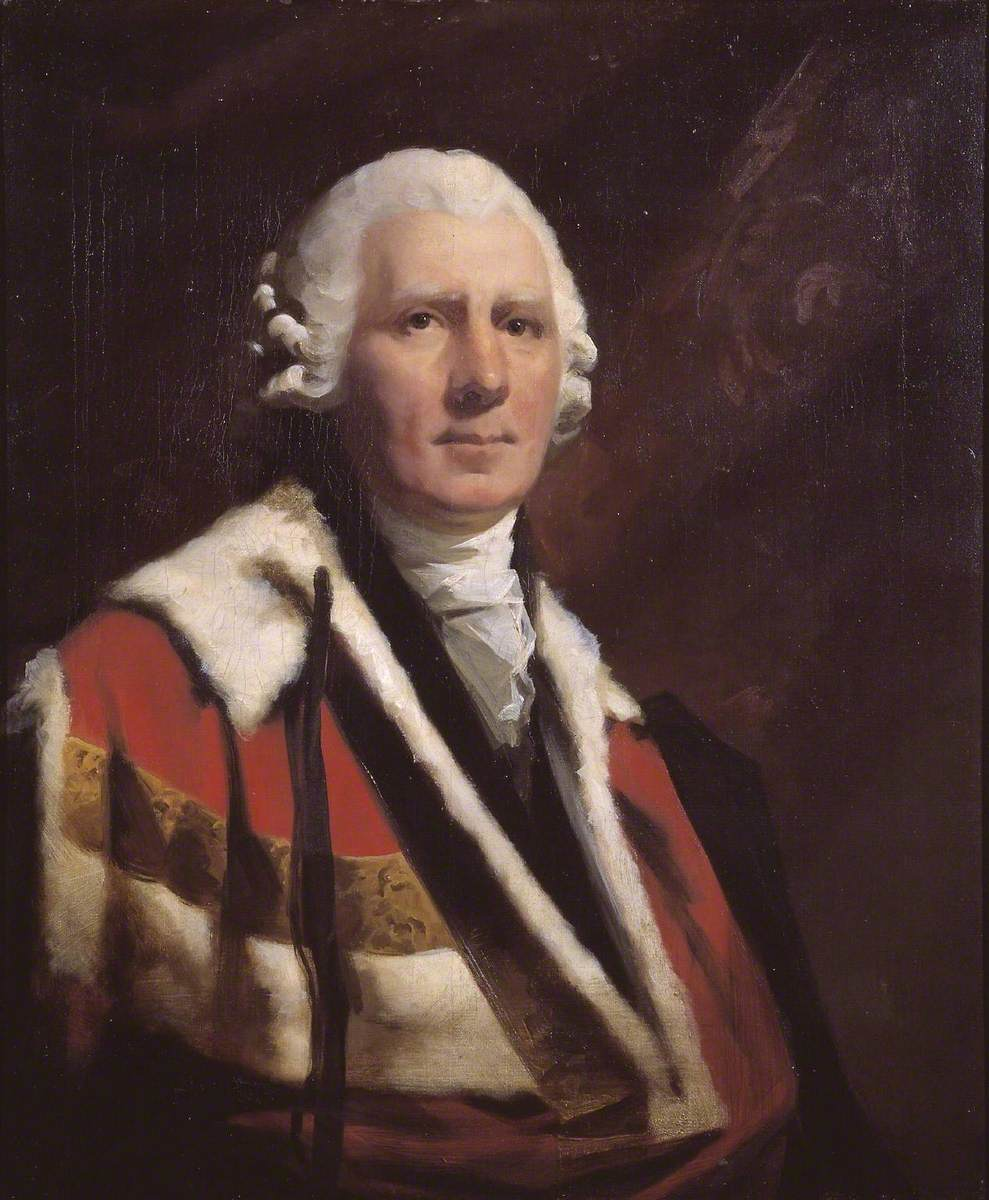
Henry Dundas, 1st Viscount Melville

Henry Dundas laid out his goals for the mission in Macartney's official instructions. More British subjects had been trading in China than any other Europeans. Despite this, the British had no direct contact with the emperor, in contrast to the Portuguese, whose Jesuit missionaries retained permanent positions at the imperial court. Macartney was instructed to negotiate a relaxation of the Canton System, such that British traders could operate in more ports and markets, and to obtain a small island on the Chinese coast from which British merchants could operate under British jurisdiction. He was also to establish a permanent embassy in Beijing so as to create a direct line of communication between the two governments, cutting out the Cantonese merchants who had served as middlemen. Finally, he was to gather intelligence on the Chinese government and society, about which little was known in Europe at the time.

The instructions from Dundas also stipulated that Macartney should establish trade relations with other nations of the East. To that effect, Macartney was given letters of credence to the Emperor of Japan, to be executed after completing his mission to China. The instructions stated that it may be useful for him to visit Japan to establish trade relations, particularly to enable a trade in tea.

Despite the misgivings of the East India Company about the potential downsides of the mission, the company was compelled by the government to fund the effort. Dundas and Macartney prioritised national interests over those of the company, which feared the loss of its monopoly position, and the possibility that the embassy would strain diplomatic relations instead of improving them. By sending a direct representative of the British crown, British politician and later Foreign Secretary Lord Grenville reasoned that the mission would be given greater attention than if it had been sent "only in the name of a trading company".

One of the goals of the embassy was to demonstrate the utility of British science and technology, in hopes of encouraging Chinese purchases of British goods. In keeping with these objectives, the mission was to bring with it a number of gifts including clocks, telescopes, weapons, textiles, and other products of technology. Macartney intended the display of technical prowess to reflect Britain's "national character", one of ingenuity, exploration, and curiosity about the natural world. Nevertheless, Dundas reminded him that the mission was not "a delegation of the Royal Society".

== Voyage to China ==
The delegation departed Portsmouth aboard three ships on 26 September 1792. The ship of the line HMS Lion, under Captain Sir Erasmus Gower, led the mission. Lion was accompanied by the East Indiaman Hindostan of the East India Company under Captain William Mackintosh along with the brig Jackall. A storm soon hit the squadron, forcing it to stop temporarily at Torbay. After making repairs, Lion and Hindostan resumed their voyage without Jackall, which had gone missing in the storm. Fortunately, the gifts to be presented to the Emperor were stored on Lion and Hindostan. Thomas spent the voyage studying Chinese with the mission's interpreters.

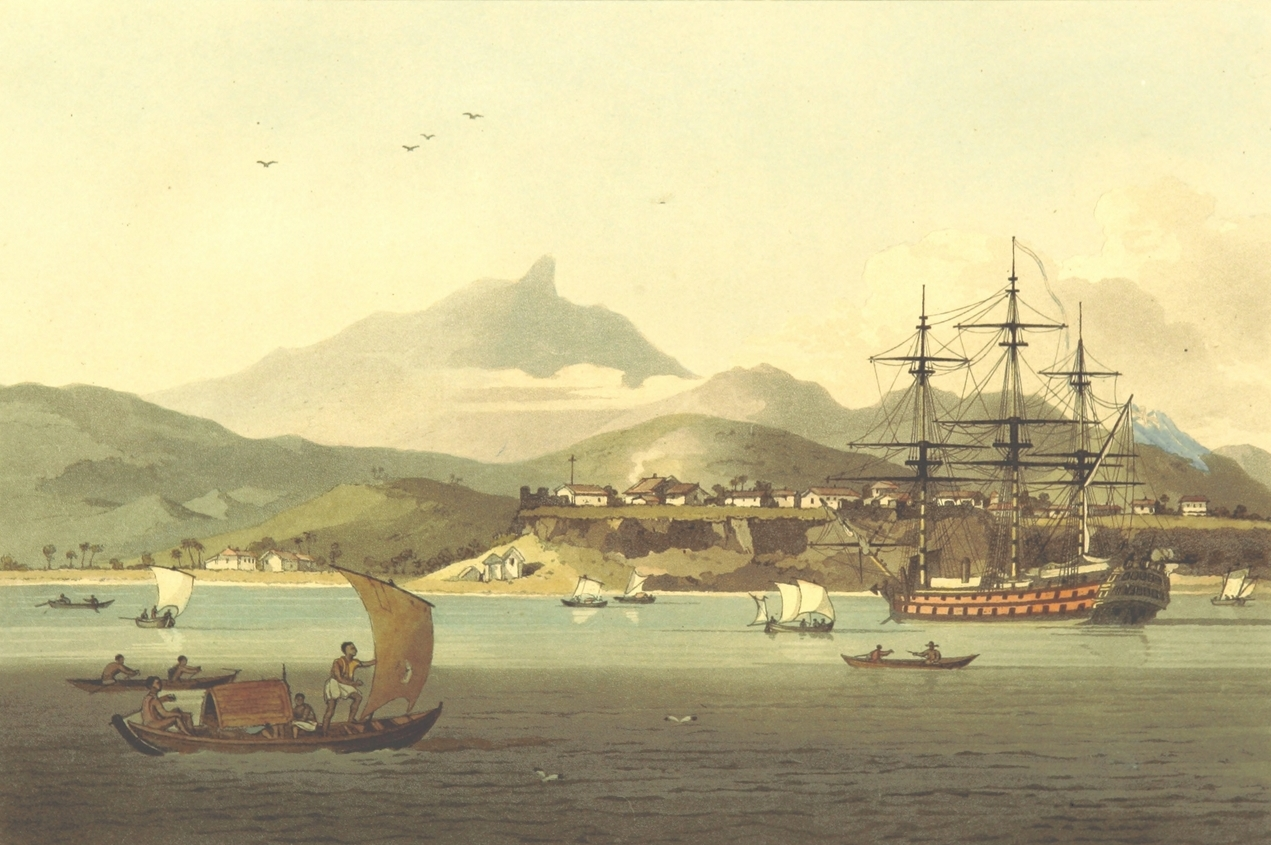
HMS Lion off Porto Praya in November 1792

The squadron stopped at Madeira in early October, and at the Canary Islands later that same month. On 1 November, they arrived at Porto Praya in Cape Verde. After waiting five days for Jackall, they continued on their journey. The crews of Lion and Hindostan believed that the ship was wrecked, but it actually survived and would reunite with the other ships later. The trade winds off the coast of Africa forced them to sail west all the way to Rio de Janeiro, where they arrived at the end of November. Macartney suffered an attack of gout which lasted a month. As Thomas studied the Chinese language, Macartney learned everything he could about China from the books he had placed in Lion's library.

The expedition departed Rio de Janeiro on 17 December and sailed east once more, rounding the Cape of Good Hope on 7 January 1793. They passed Java in February and reached Batavia on 6 March. There, they bought a French brig which they christened Clarence, to replace Jackall. However, Jackall rejoined the squadron at Batavia, after having turned back for repairs after the storm that had struck the ships at the start of their voyage. From 26 May to 16 June, the embassy anchored at Tourane and visited Tây Sơn-ruled Cochinchina where they received gifts from emperor Cảnh Thịnh. On 7 June, the master of the Lion and other seven men were arrested by the locals while attempting to survey the Campella river, they were released a week later.

The full squadron sailed on to Macau, where they arrived on 19 June 1793. There, George Staunton disembarked to meet with officials of the East India Company. The two Chinese Catholic priests who had been offered free passage to Macau departed there, along with one of the two priests from Naples, leaving only one Chinese interpreter with the mission. For the next leg of the trip, Macartney and Dundas had intended to avoid Guangzhou altogether. Instead of proceeding overland from there, the plan was for the embassy to continue by sea to Tianjin, the closest major port to Beijing. Such a route had never been charted by European sailors as all trade had been through Guangzhou. Macartney wanted to continue to Tianjin instead of taking the inland route partially because of precious items on the boat, but he also wanted to use the mission to explore the Yellow Sea for future missions.

== Arrival ==
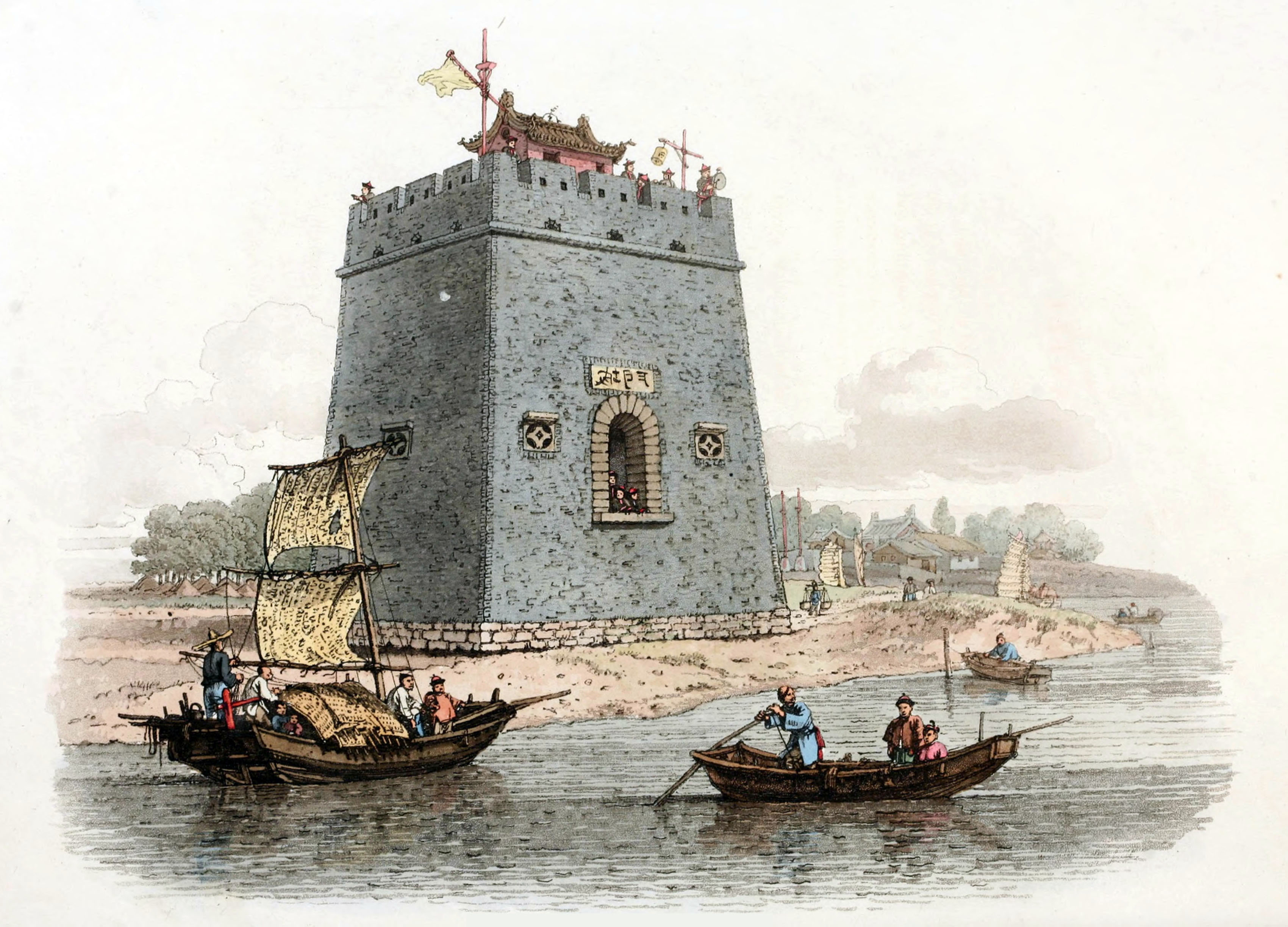
A fort near Tianjin, by William Alexander (1793)

Representatives of the East India Company met with the military governor of Guangdong ahead of Macartney's arrival, in order to request permission for the embassy to land at Tianjin instead of Guangzhou. The governor at first refused, as it was considered improper for a tributary mission to select its own port of arrival. The British officials pointed out, however, that the ships carried many large, precious items that might be damaged if taken overland. Moreover, as the governor noted in his report to the Emperor, the embassy had journeyed a great distance, and would be greatly delayed if sent back to Guangzhou from Tianjin. The Qianlong Emperor agreed to the request, and instructed his officials to lead the embassy to him with the utmost civility. The Emperor's response was brought back to Guangzhou by General Fuk'anggan, Viceroy of Liangguang, who had recently returned after fighting in the Sino-Nepalese War.

The embassy departed Macao on 23 June. It stopped in Zhoushan, where Staunton went ashore to meet with the military governor of Dinghai. The Emperor had sent instructions to every port in China to provide pilots to guide the British visitors, and the governor did so. However, Chinese officials had not anticipated that the British intended to sail the high seas rather than hopping from port to port in shallow waters along the coast, as was typical of Chinese vessels. They expressed surprise at the size and speed of the British ships. Anticipating that these vessels with their deep hulls would not be able to proceed upstream past Tianjin, they hired boats to carry the mission and its cargo to the capital.

The East Indiaman Endeavour was sent to pilot the ships of the embassy to Tianjin, and joined the squadron when it reached the Yellow Sea. The mission arrived at the mouth of the Hai River (known as the Pei Ho in European sources of the time) on 25 July, and dropped anchor, finding the muddy water impassable for the larger vessels. The gifts were unloaded from the British ships and transferred upstream to Dagu by junks. From there, they were unloaded again onto smaller boats to Tongzhou, the endpoint of the Grand Canal. Macartney and his group continued separately to Dagu on the smallest British ships, the Jackall, the Clarence, and the Endeavour. On 6 August, Macartney and Staunton met with Liang Kentang (梁肯堂), Viceroy of Zhili, who had traveled from Baoding to see them. Liang agreed to permit the Lion and Hindostan to return to Zhoushan at Macartney's request. He also informed Macartney that the meeting with the Emperor was to take place at the Chengde Mountain Resort in Rehe (Jehol), rather than in the capital (Beijing) as the British delegation had expected.

The embassy continued to Tianjin, where it arrived on 11 August. Macartney and Staunton attended a banquet with viceroy Liang and the Manchu legate Zhengrui(徵瑞), who stipulated that all gifts were to be brought to Rehe and laid at the Emperor's feet in accordance with protocol. However, Macartney convinced the viceroy to permit some of the gifts to be left in Beijing to avoid damaging them on the journey to Rehe. The imperial court had advised Liang not to accompany Macartney to the capital, so as to avoid giving the British too high a sense of their own status. According to Qianlong, "treated too favorably, a Barbarian becomes arrogant". Instead of the viceroy, Zhengrui would act as the mission's liaison. The mission continued up the Hai River on small boats pulled by men along the shore using ropes and harnesses. It landed at Tongzhou on 16 August.

=== Beijing ===
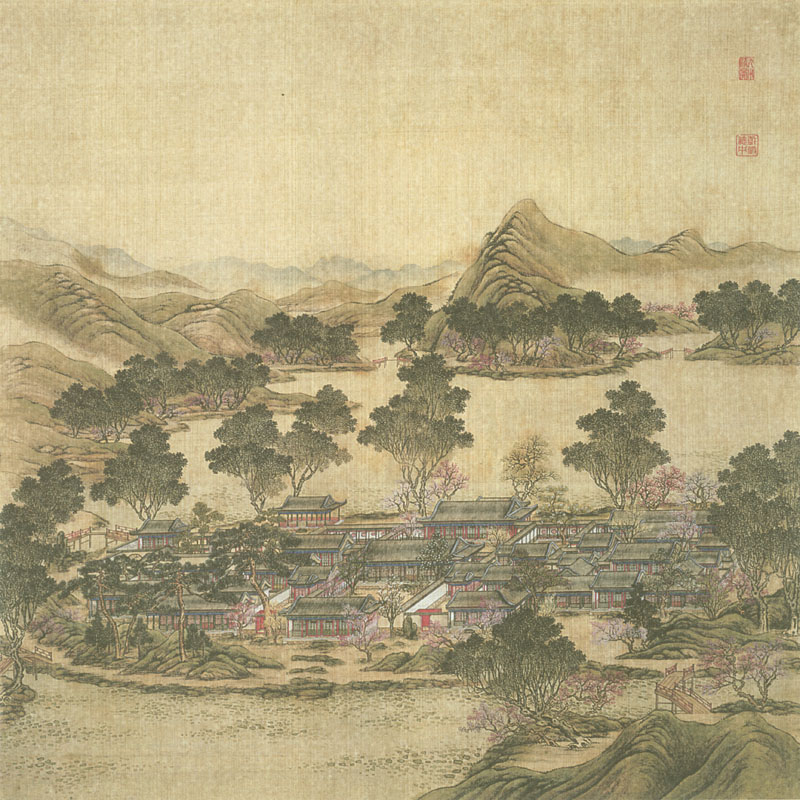
The Old Summer Palace, where the embassy's gifts were put on display

The embassy reached Beijing on 21 August. It was escorted to a residence north of Beijing, near the Old Summer Palace. The British were not permitted to leave the premises for the duration of their stay. Wanting to be closer to China's political centre, Macartney received permission from Zhengrui to move to a different residence in Beijing, which had been intended to house the embassy after the meeting with the Emperor. In Beijing, responsibility for the embassy on the Chinese side would be shared between Zhengrui and two other officials: Jin Jian (金簡), a minister of public works, and his vice minister Yiling'a(伊齡阿). The gifts brought by the embassy were stored amongst other tribute items in the throne room at the Old Summer Palace, which Macartney was the first Briton to visit. Barrow and Dinwiddie were responsible for assembling and arranging the gifts. The most important item, the planetarium, was so complex that it took 18 days to assemble.

On 24 August, legate Zhengrui brought a letter to Macartney from Sir Erasmus Gower, who reported that the ships of the embassy had reached Zhoushan as ordered. Macartney replied with instructions for Gower to continue on to Guangzhou, but Zhengrui secretly forwarded the letter to the Emperor at Rehe instead of dispatching it to Zhoushan. Several men aboard the Lion had died of disease in August, and the squadron stopped in Zhoushan to recuperate. Having received word that the British ships were beset with illness, Qianlong instructed the viceroy of Zhejiang to ensure the British were quarantined at Zhoushan. The court reprimanded Zhengrui regarding his forwarding of Macartney's letter. An imperial edict written by Heshen, a member of the Grand Council and a favourite of the Emperor, stipulated that Zhengrui was not to make reports alone without the signatures of Jin Jian and Yiling'a, nor make decisions unilaterally. Heshen is now regarded as the most corrupt official in Chinese history. The Jiaqing Emperor realised this in 1796 after the abdication of Qianlong and forced him to commit suicide. As an official, Heshen acquired silver worth an estimated US$270 billion. Heshen's insistence that the British pay for tea in silver would frustrate trade for the next half century. As was typical of imperial edicts, the letter contained commentary in vermilion ink by the emperor's own hand. Calling Zhengrui "contemptible and ridiculous", Qianlong ordered him to send Macartney's letter to the viceroy of Zhejiang so the British vessels could leave Zhoushan.

All members of the embassy except Barrow and Dinwiddie were moved to their new quarters in central Beijing on 26 August, as Macartney had requested.

=== Crossing the Great Wall ===
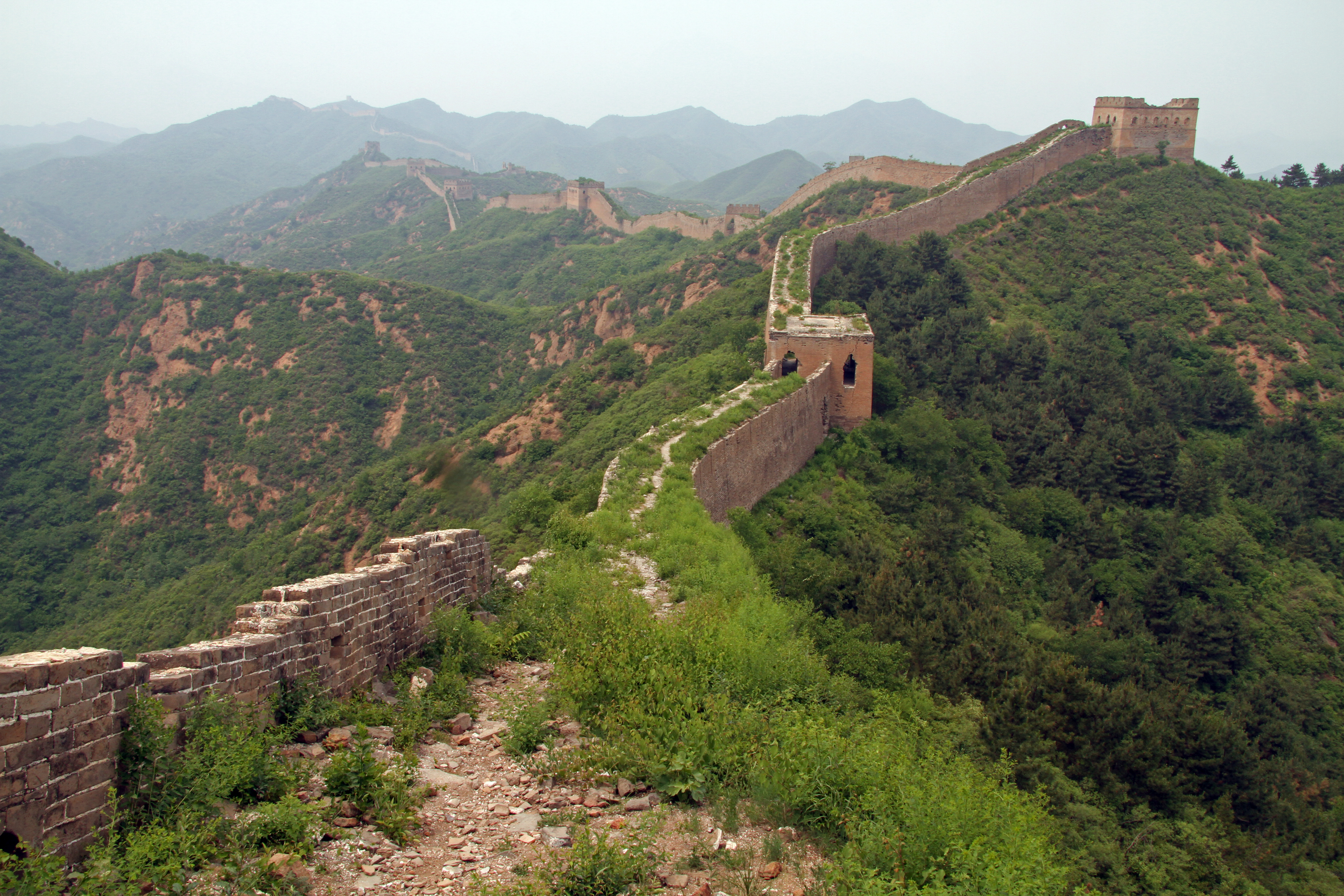
The Great Wall at Gubeikou

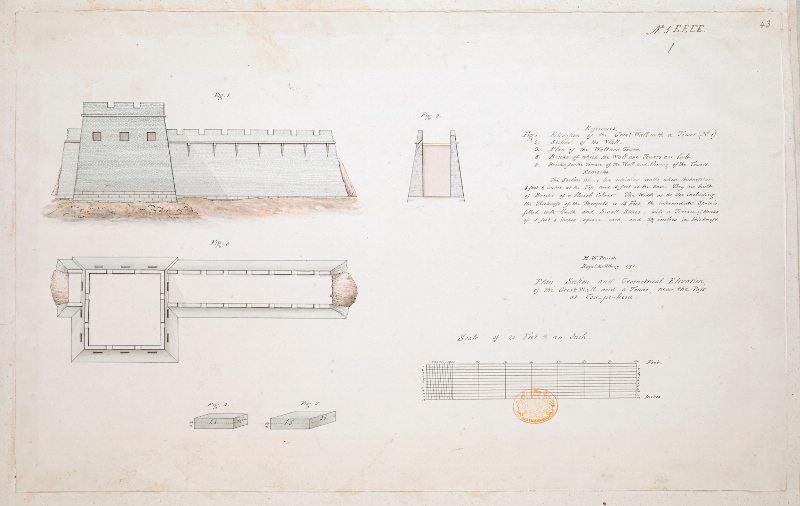
One of Lieutenant Parish's technical drawings of the Great Wall of China

Having left behind the planetarium and other gifts at the Old Summer Palace, about seventy members of the mission, among them forty soldiers, departed Beijing on 2 September, heading north towards Jehol, where the Qianlong Emperor awaited. The mission proceeded alongside a road reserved for the Emperor alone, stopping each night at one of the lodges prepared for the emperor's use along the way. Guard posts punctuated the route at roughly five mile intervals, and Macartney observed a large number of troops working to repair the road in preparation for the Emperor's return to Beijing later in the year.

The group crossed the Great Wall of China at Gubeikou, where they were greeted by ceremonial gunfire and several companies of troops from the Eight Banners of the Qing military. William Alexander, who stayed behind in Beijing, expressed regret at being unable to see the Wall for himself. Under Macartney's orders, Lieutenant Henry William Parish of the Royal Artillery made a survey of the Great Wall's fortifications with his men, thereby contributing to the intelligence-gathering aspect of the mission, though at the expense of arousing suspicion among their Chinese hosts. Some of the men, meanwhile, took bricks from the Wall as souvenirs. Past the Great Wall, the terrain became more mountainous and difficult for the men's horses to traverse, slowing their progress. The entourage arrived at the outskirts of Chengde on 8 September.

== Meeting with Qianlong ==
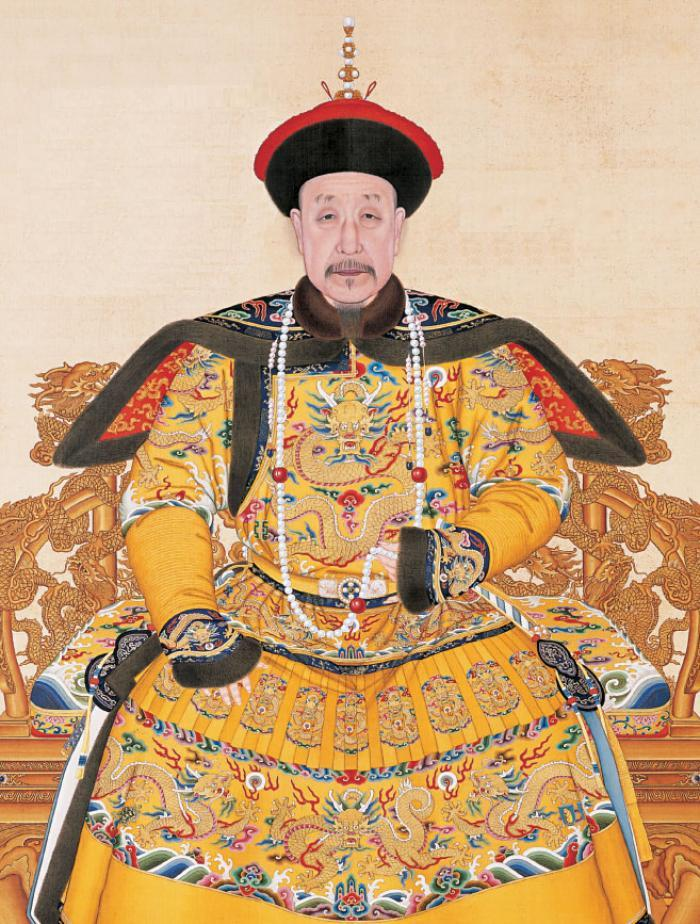
The Qianlong Emperor

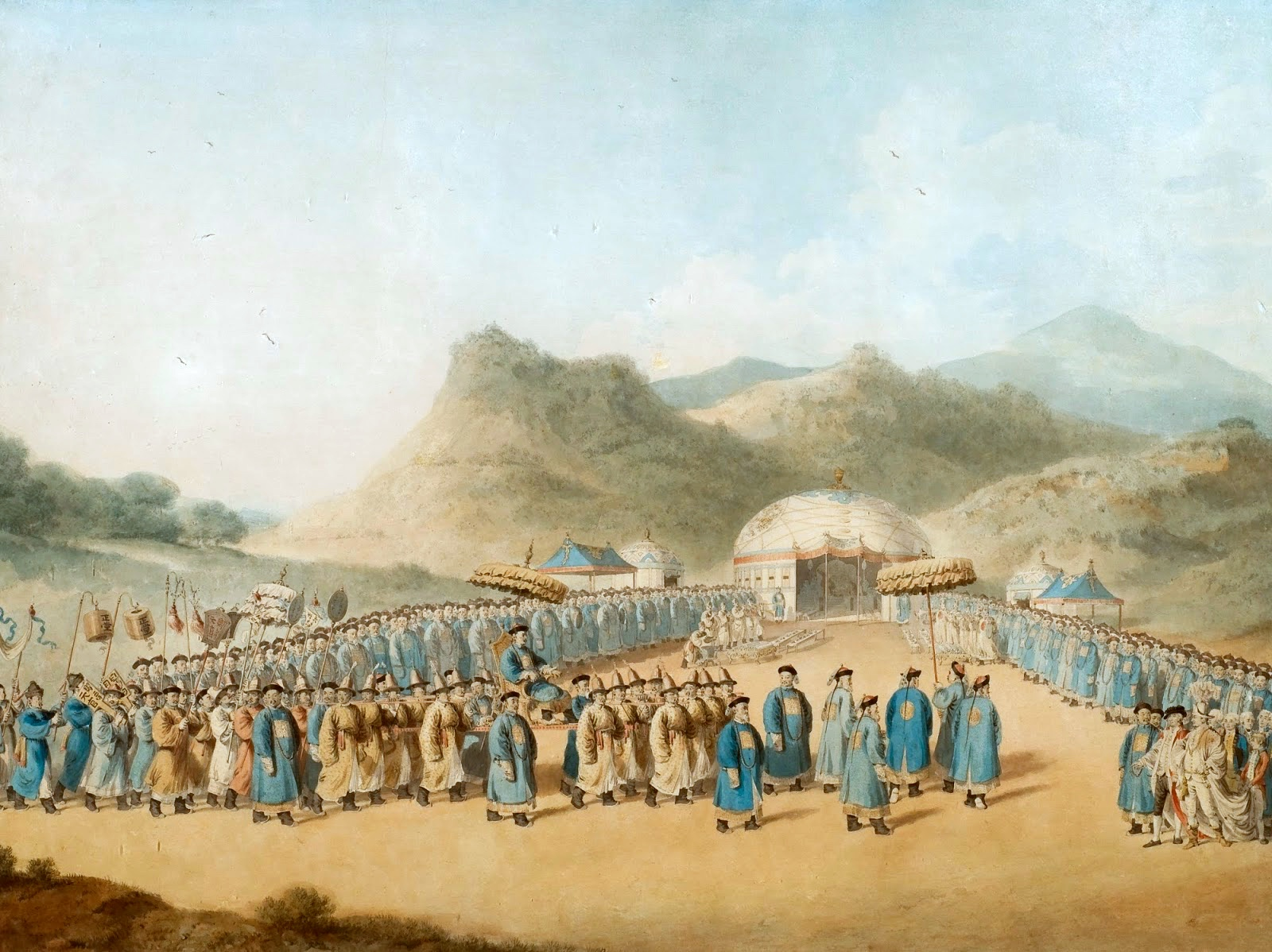
The Approach of the Emperor of China to His Tent in Tartary to Receive the British Ambassador, by William Alexander (1793)

It was the practice of the Manchu emperors of the Qing dynasty to lead a ritual hunting expedition north of the Great Wall each autumn. During the reign of Qianlong's grandfather the Kangxi Emperor, an imperial city was built near the hunting grounds at Chengde to house the emperor and his entourage while he was away from Beijing. It was at Chengde that Qing emperors often greeted foreign dignitaries, particularly Inner Asians who represented vassal states. Here too, Macartney's embassy was to meet Qianlong on the occasion of the Emperor's birthday. Qianlong called off the hunt to return to Chengde for the ceremonies, as he had done previously in 1754 and 1780 for the visits of Amursana and the Sixth Panchen Lama, respectively (the latter on the occasion of Qianlong's 70th birthday).

=== The kowtow issue ===
Even before Macartney's departure from Britain, he and Dundas had anticipated that there might be some disagreement with the Chinese side on the details of the ceremonies and rituals to be performed at the meeting between Macartney and the emperor of China. Dundas had instructed Macartney to accept "all ceremonials of the Court which may not commit the honour of your Sovereign or lessen your own dignity", and not to let any "trifling punctilio" get in the way of the mission. The ritual of the kowtow, which requires an individual to kneel with both knees on the ground and bow so as to touch their forehead to the ground, presented a particular dilemma. The kowtow was required not only when meeting the emperor, but also when receiving imperial edicts from his messengers. While Portuguese and Dutch merchants in Canton (now Guangzhou) had acquiesced to the ritual, British subjects, who regarded the act as slavish and humiliating, generally avoided kowtowing to the emperor's edicts by leaving the room when such messages were received.

For Macartney, one sticking point was the relative status of the two sovereigns, George III and Qianlong. Macartney believed that Britain was now the most powerful nation on Earth. However, as a diplomat, he had decided that whatever ceremony he participated in must present the two monarchs as equals, and thus he would only show Qianlong the same level of respect he would show his own king (he saw the Kowtow as too excessive). Throughout his meetings with Chinese officials, Macartney was repeatedly urged to perform the kowtow during his audience with the emperor. In one message to legate Zhengrui and viceroy Liang Kentang during Macartney's stay in Tianjin, Heshen had instructed the two men to inform Britain's representative that he would be regarded as a "boor" and a "laughingstock" if he did not perform the ritual when the time came. Officials also told Macartney in private that the kowtow was just a "mere exterior and unmeaning ceremony" and he should perform it. Nevertheless, Macartney submitted to Zhengrui a written proposal that would satisfy his requirement of equal status: whatever ceremony he performed, a Chinese official of equal rank would do the same before a portrait of George III. He believed it demeaning that Britain would have to go through the same rituals (and be seen as equal to) Chinese vassal states like Korea.

Zhengrui objected to this proposal, on the grounds that this notion of reciprocal equality was incompatible with the Chinese view of the emperor as the Son of Heaven, who had no equal. According to such a view, the British embassy was regarded officially as a tribute mission like any other. Despite Macartney and Staunton's insistence that the items the embassy brought were "gifts", Chinese officials saw them as "tribute" items. Macartney himself was to be seen as only a "conveyor of tribute", not a "legate of the sovereign" as he had earlier referred to himself which annoyed the emperor.

Qianlong's compromise on the issue, stated in an edict dated 8 September (the day of the embassy's arrival in Chengde), was that Macartney could perform a single prostration in lieu of the nine typically called for. However, Staunton submitted Macartney's proposal to Heshen the day after their arrival, reiterating the British stance on the issue. With no agreement in sight and the ceremony only days away, Qianlong grew increasingly impatient, and considered scrapping the meeting altogether. Finally, it was agreed that Macartney would genuflect before the Emperor as he would before his own sovereign, touching one knee to the ground, although without the usual hand kissing, as it was not customary for anyone to kiss the emperor's hand. He would do this in addition to the single prostration.

=== The ceremony ===
The meeting with the Qianlong Emperor took place on 14 September. The British set off, with Macartney in a palanquin, from their residence at 3 AM in the darkness, arriving at the imperial encampment at 4 AM. Macartney was accompanied by servants, musicians, and other representatives. The ceremony was to be held in the imperial tent, a large yellow yurt which contained the Emperor's throne at the center of a raised platform. Several thousand attendees were present, including other foreign visitors (from Burma and from Muslim tribes in near the Caspian Sea), viceroy Liang Kentang and the Emperor's son, the future Jiaqing Emperor. The Emperor arrived at 7, presiding as khan over the proceedings. Macartney entered the tent along with George and Thomas Staunton, and their Chinese interpreter. The others waited outside.

Macartney stepped up to the platform first, kneeling once, exchanging gifts with Qianlong and presenting King George III's letter. King George's letter had been translated into Chinese by European missionaries in China. They had made the letter more respectful towards the Emperor by removing references to Christianity and turning the letter into Honorific form (so the word "emperor" is written larger). He was followed by George Staunton, and finally Thomas Staunton. As Thomas had studied the Chinese language, the Emperor beckoned him to speak a few words (Thomas said in his diary that he thanked the Emperor for the gifts). The British were followed by other envoys, about whom little is written. A banquet was then held to conclude the day's events. The British were seated on the Emperor's left, in the most prestigious position.

== Outcome ==
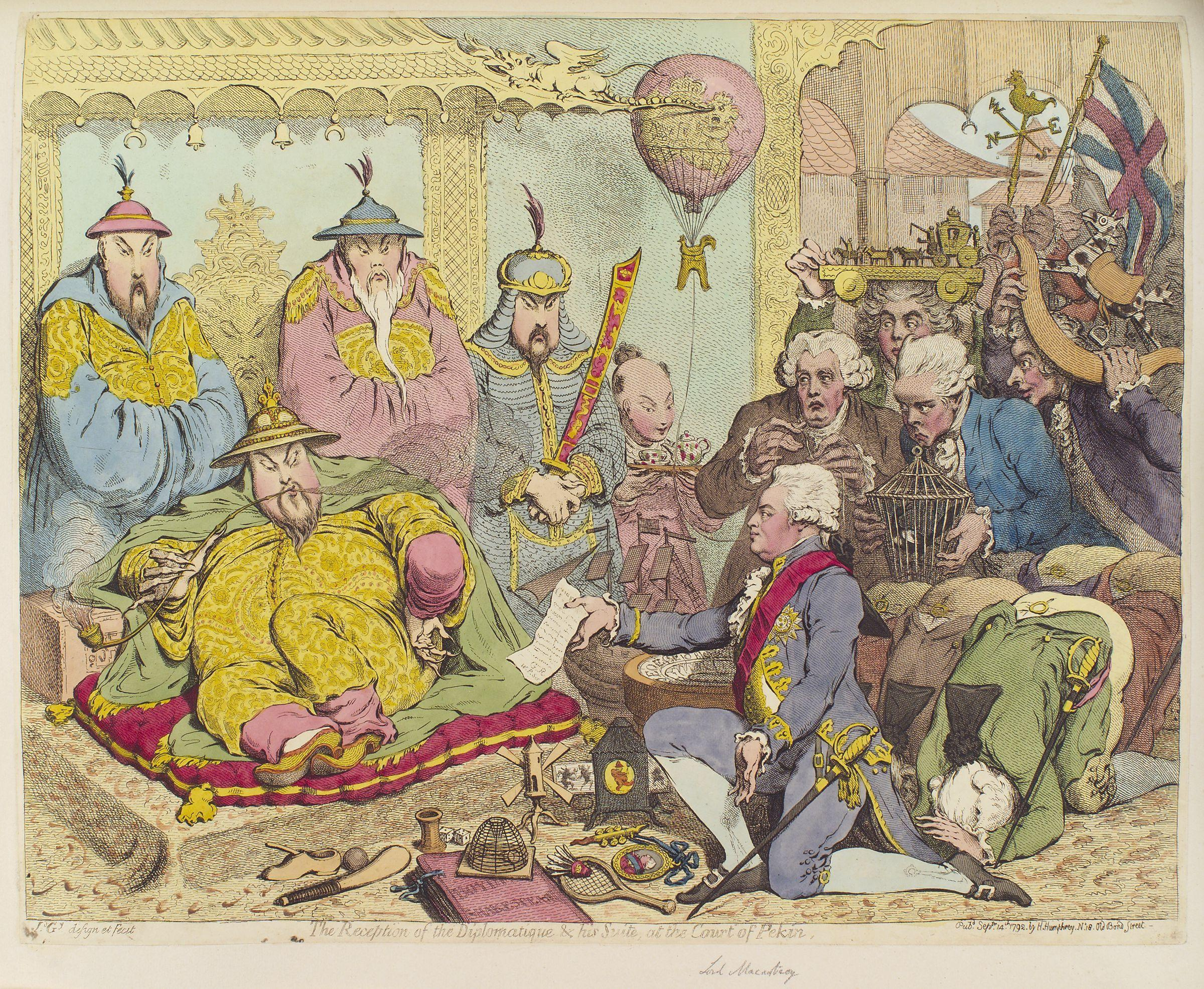
The Reception, a cartoon by James Gillray of the reception that he expected Lord Macartney to get from the Qianlong Emperor

Our Celestial Empire possesses all things in prolific abundance and lacks no product within its borders. There is therefore no need to import the manufactures of outside barbarians in exchange for our own produce.

— Qianlong Emperor, Second Edict to King George III of Great Britain, 1792

Despite this dismissal, Qianlong had noted the military superiority implied by several gifts: six brass cannon, a flintlock with an advanced firing mechanism and a model of HMS Royal Sovereign. The gifts that might really have shifted Chinese perceptions were steel and steam: locomotives and steel rails would dramatically increase the productivity of Britain in a few years time. The flexibility of steel swords was noted by courtiers, but the model steam engine was not unpacked. Instead it was given to Dinwiddie to show off in India. China would not acquire advanced steel production until several decades into Mao Zedong's premiership in the People's Republic of China period.

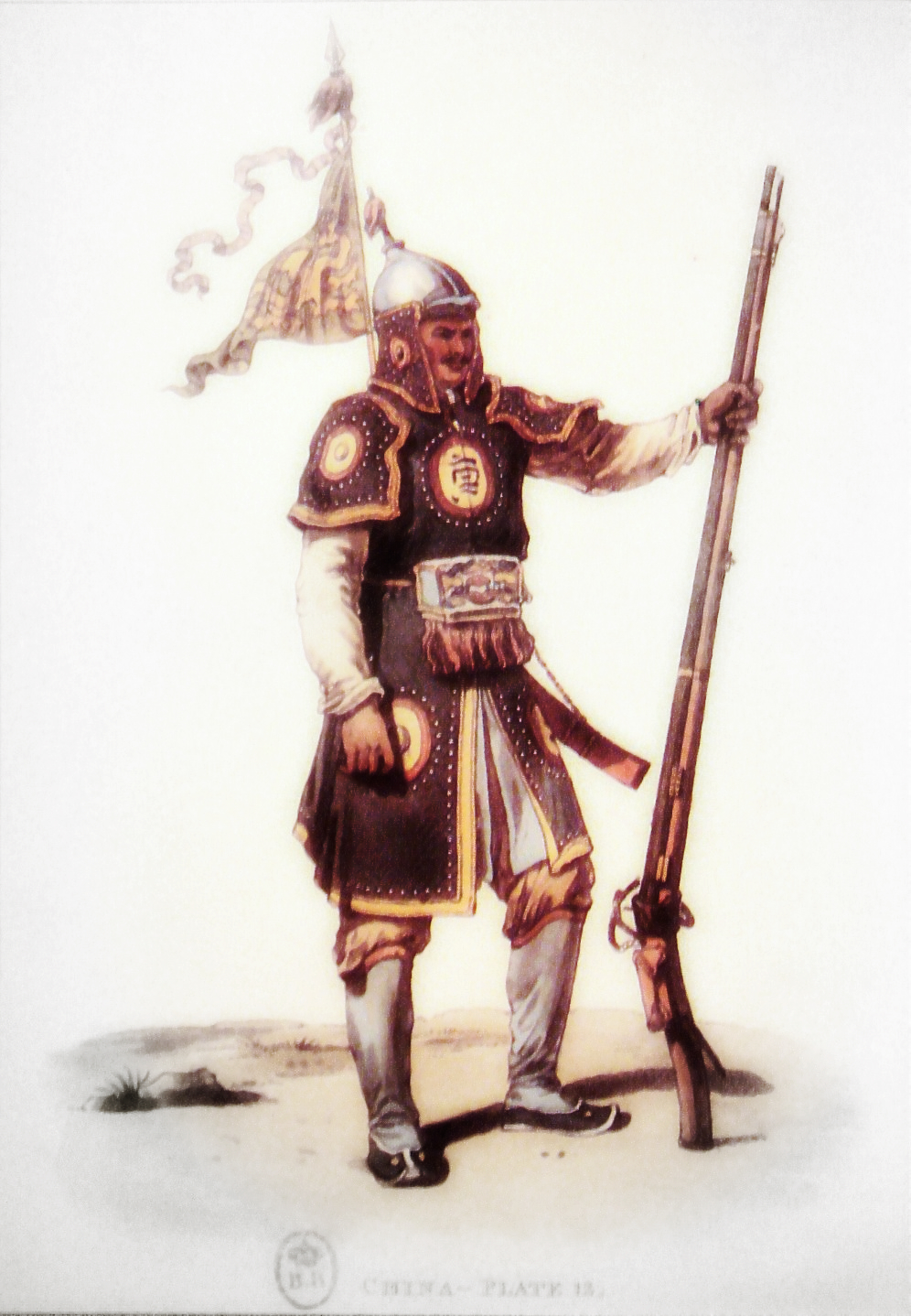
Chinese soldier, by William Alexander

Although ultimately unsuccessful in its primary objectives, the circumstances surrounding the mission provided ample opportunity for both British and Chinese parties to feel totally satisfied about the compromises and concessions they had made. The failure of the primary objectives was not due to Macartney's refusal to kowtow in the presence of the Emperor, as is sometimes believed. It was also not a result of the Chinese reliance on tradition in dictating foreign policy, but rather a result of competing world views which were uncomprehending and to some extent incompatible. After the conclusion of the embassy, Qianlong sent a letter to King George III, explaining in greater depth the reasons for his refusal to grant the several requests presented to the Chinese emperor by Macartney. The requests had included a call for the relaxation of the restrictions on trade between Britain and China, the acquisition by Britain of "a small unfortified island near Chusan for the residence of British traders, storage of goods, and outfitting of ships"; and the establishment of a permanent British embassy in Beijing. However, Qianlong's letter's continuing reference to all Europeans as "barbarians", his assumption of all nations of the earth as being subordinate to China, and his final words commanding King George III to "...Tremblingly obey and show no negligence!" used the standard imperial sign off as if the king were a Chinese subject.

Historians both in China and abroad long presented the failure of the mission to achieve its goals as a symbol of China's refusal to change and inability to modernize. They explain the refusal first on the fact that interaction with foreign kingdoms was limited to neighbouring tributary states. Furthermore, the worldviews on the two sides were incompatible, China holding entrenched beliefs that China was the "central kingdom". However, after the publication in the 1990s of a fuller range of archival documents concerning the visit, these claims have been challenged. One historian characterized the Emperor and his court as "clearly clever and competent political operators", and concluded that they acted within the formal Qing claims to universal rule; they reacted prudently to reports of British expansion in India by placating the British with unspecified promises in order to avoid military conflicts and loss of trade. Qianlong also said that he could have revoked Britain's existing privileges due to the King's behavior, but he would not. He said he felt sympathy for England because it is remote and ignorant of the great Chinese civilization. This angered the King and the public in England.

Critics in England said the problem with the embassy was that it "acknowledged the inferiority of its country [England]". Macartney himself became ridiculed, with caricatures showing him debasing himself before the Emperor. Macartney became more hostile and negative towards China in his later writings, saying China's power was an illusion and that Qing China would decline and eventually collapse. Macartney predicted that China might collapse within his lifetime.

The Macartney Embassy is historically significant for many reasons, most of them visible only in retrospect. While to a modern sensibility it marked a missed opportunity by both sides to explore and understand each other's cultures, customs, diplomatic styles, and ambitions, it also prefigured increasing British pressure on China to accommodate its expanding trading and imperial network. The mutual lack of knowledge and understanding on both sides would continue to plague the Qing dynasty as it encountered increasing foreign pressure and internal unrest during the 19th century.

Although the Macartney Embassy returned to London without obtaining any concession from China, the mission could be termed a success in that it brought back detailed observations of a great empire. Macartney predicted that Indo-British forces could destroy the Chinese in all frontiers in a military conflict, but warned that such an offensive would be against the interests of British trade. He also rightly observed that the empire's internal stability was weak, and there could be a breaking up of the power of China, throwing the international commerce into confusion. The painter William Alexander accompanied the embassy, and published numerous engravings based on his watercolours. Sir George Staunton was charged with producing the official account of the expedition after their return. This multi-volume work was taken chiefly from the papers of Lord Macartney and from the papers of Sir Erasmus Gower, who was Commander of the expedition. Sir Joseph Banks was responsible for selecting and arranging engraving of the illustrations in this official record.

== Members ==
The Macartney Embassy comprised about a hundred people, including:

- George Macartney, 1st Earl Macartney
- Second-in-command: Sir George Staunton, 1st Baronet, accompanied by his 12-year-old son Sir George Staunton, 2nd Baronet
- Comptroller: Sir John Barrow, 1st Baronet
- Doctors: Hugh Gillan, William Scott
- Artists: William Alexander, Thomas Hickey
- Scientist: James Dinwiddie
- Botanical gardeners: David Stronach, John Haxton
- Commander: Erasmus Gower, captain of HMS Lion
- Lieutenant John Crewe
- Lieutenant Henry William Parish, Royal Artillery officer and a trained draftsman
- Lieutenant-Colonel George Benson, Commandant of the fifty-man Ambassador's Guard
- Interpreters: Paolo Cho (周保羅) and Jacobus Li (李雅各; 李自標; Li Zibiao)

== See also ==
- Qianlong
- Heshen
- China–United Kingdom relations
- Foreign relations of imperial China
- Amherst Embassy
- Andreas Everardus van Braam Houckgeest
