= Sir George Staunton, 1st Baronet =

Anglo-Irish physician, judge and diplomat (1737–1801)

Sir George Staunton Bt FRS
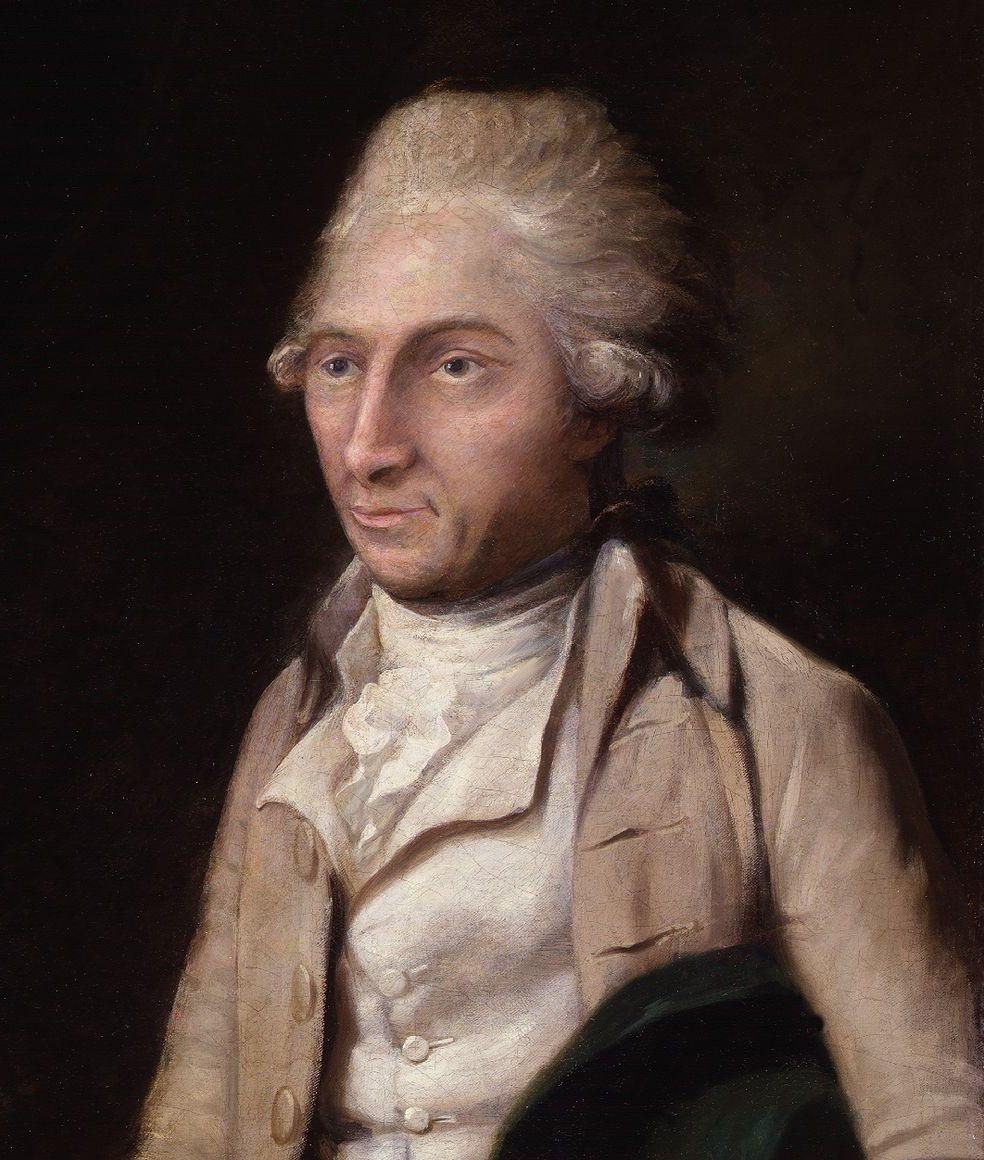
- Portrait by Lemuel Francis Abbott, c. 1785
- Born: 10 April 1737; Cargin, County Galway, Ireland
- Died: 14 January 1801 (aged 63); London, England
- Education: Jesuit College (Toulouse); University of Montpellier; University of Oxford
- Occupations: Physician, judge, diplomat
- Children: George Staunton

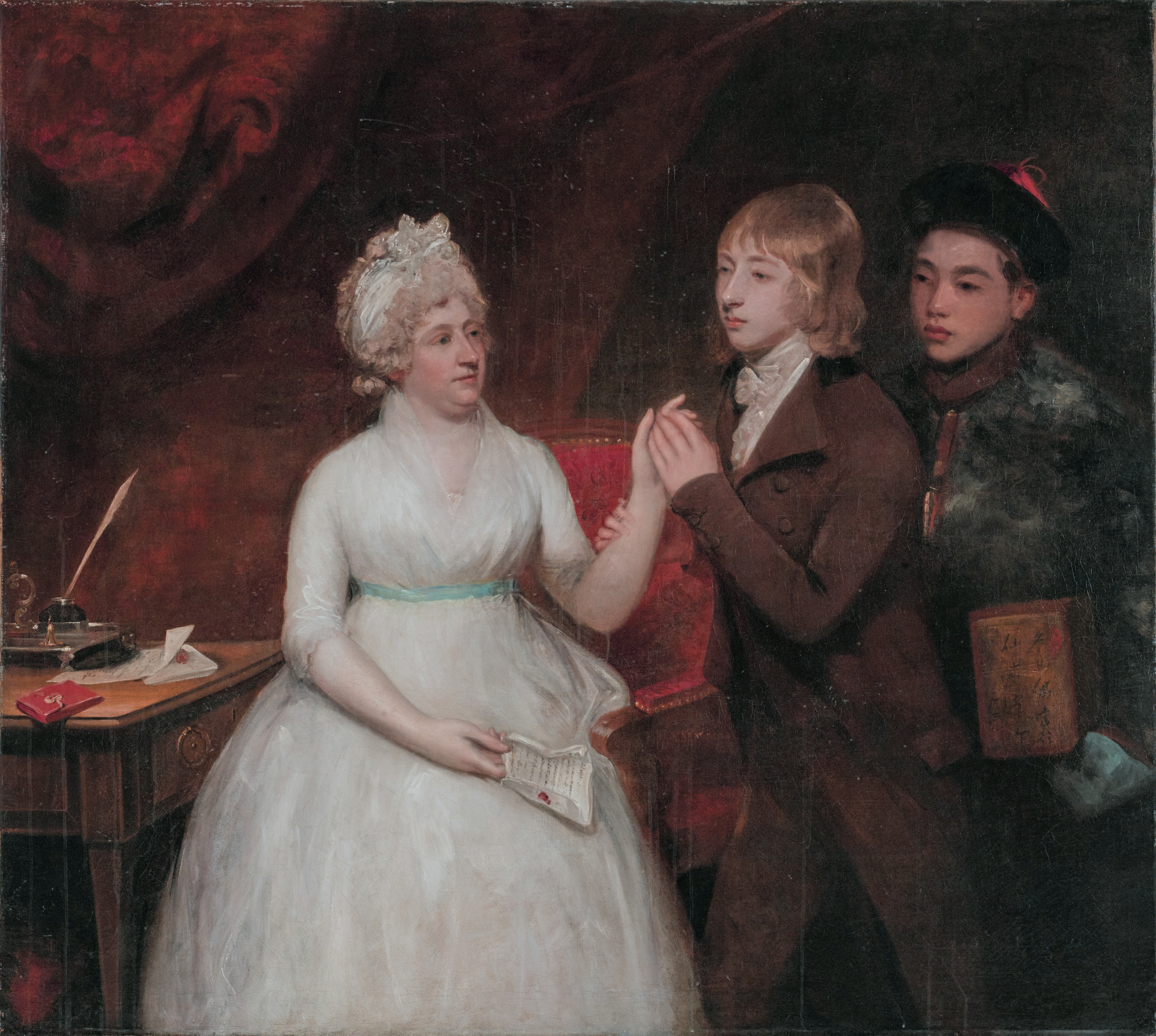
A portrait of Staunton's wife Jane and son George by John Hoppner, c. 1792

Sir George Leonard Staunton, 1st Baronet FRS (10 April 1737 – 14 January 1801) was an Anglo-Irish physician, judge and diplomat best known for his participation in the Macartney Embassy.

== Life ==
George Leonard Staunton was born in Cargin, County Galway, Ireland, the son of Col. George Staunton. He was educated at the Jesuit College in Toulouse, France, obtaining an M.D. in 1758, and subsequently studied at the School of Medicine in Montpellier. He was awarded a DCL by the University of Oxford in 1790.

Staunton initially worked as a physician in the British West Indies, where he acquired slave plantations on Grenada and Dominica. He then switched to law and was made Attorney-General in Grenada in 1779. In 1784, he accompanied his lifelong friend George Macartney, 1st Earl Macartney, whom he first met in the West Indies, to Madras to negotiate peace with Tipu Sultan, for which service Staunton was created a baronet of Ireland, on 31 October 1785. He was elected in February 1787 a Fellow of the Royal Society.

In 1793, Staunton was named Secretary of the British Macartney Embassy to the Qing dynasty of China, which was headed by Lord Macartney. While the embassy returned to London without obtaining any concession from China, the mission brought back detailed observations.

Staunton died at his London house, 17 Devonshire Street, on 14 January 1801 and was buried in Westminster Abbey, where a monument by Sir Francis Chantrey was erected to his memory around 1808.

The baronetcy, Staunton's estate at Clydagh, County Galway and his London townhouse were all inherited by his only son, George Thomas Staunton.

== Works ==
Staunton was charged with producing the official account of the Macartney Embassy, after their return. It was published 1797 under the title An Authentic Account of an Embassy from the King of Great Britain to the Emperor of China. This multi-volume work was taken chiefly from papers of Lord Macartney and Sir Erasmus Gower, Commander of the expedition. Sir Joseph Banks, the President of the Royal Society, was responsible for selecting and arranging engraving of the illustrations in this official record.

Baronetage of Ireland
New creation	Baronet (of Cargins, Galway); 1785–1801	Succeeded by George Staunton
