= Sir George Staunton, 2nd Baronet =

British writer, translator and politician

Sir George Staunton Bt FRS FRAS
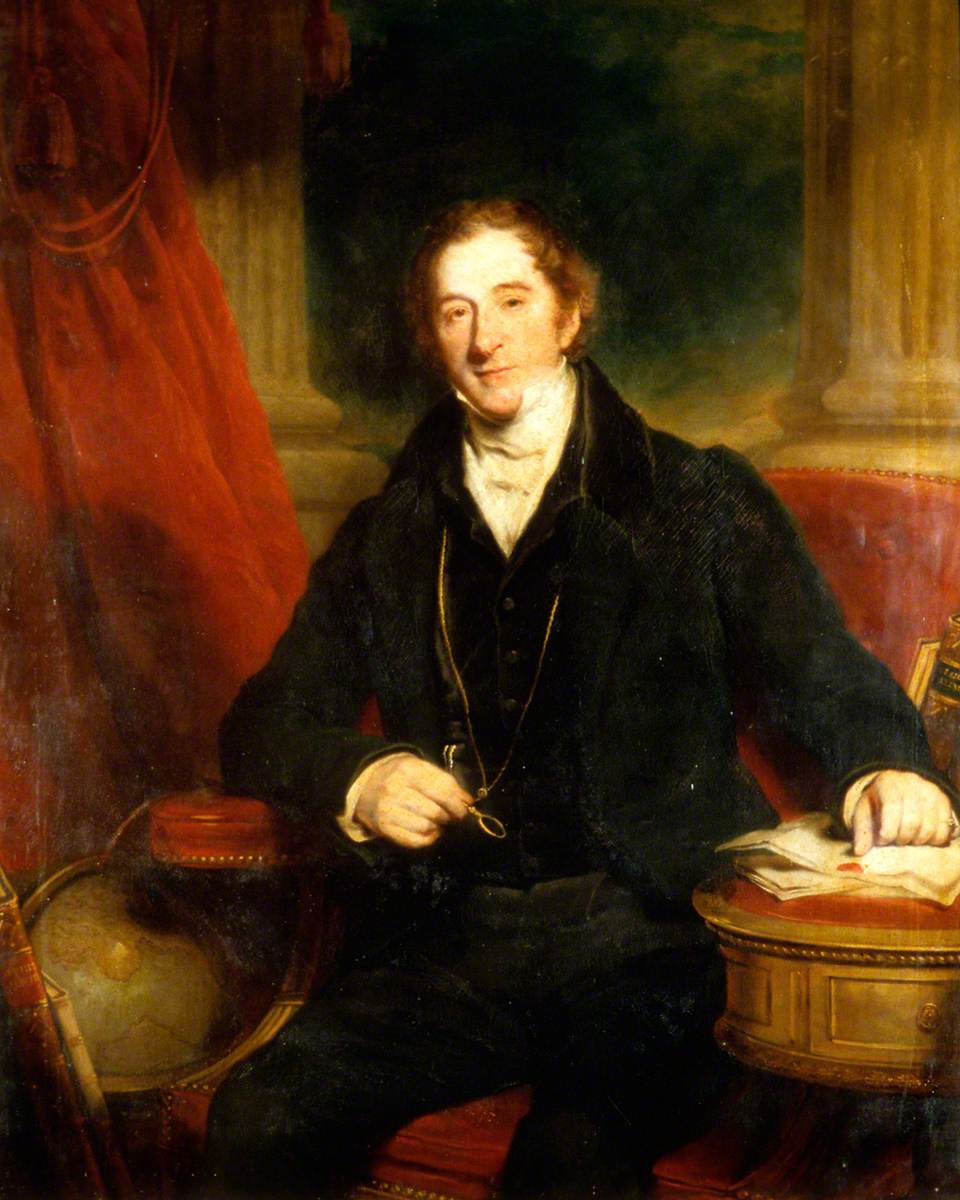
- Portrait by Martin Archer Shee, c. 1820

Member of Parliament for Mitchell
- In office 1818-1826 Serving with William Leake (1818–1820); William Taylor Money (1820–1826)

Member of Parliament for Heytesbury
- In office 1830-1832 Serving with Edward Henry A'Court

Member of Parliament for South Hampshire
- In office 1832-1835 Serving with The Viscount Palmerston

Member of Parliament for Portsmouth
- In office 1838-1852 Serving with Francis Baring

Personal details
- Born: 26 May 1781 Near Salisbury, England
- Died: 10 August 1859 (aged 78)
- Parent: George Leonard Staunton (father)
- Occupation: Orientalist, politician

Sir George Thomas Staunton, 2nd Baronet, FRS, FRAS (26 May 1781 – 10 August 1859) was a British writer, orientalist and politician.

== Early life ==
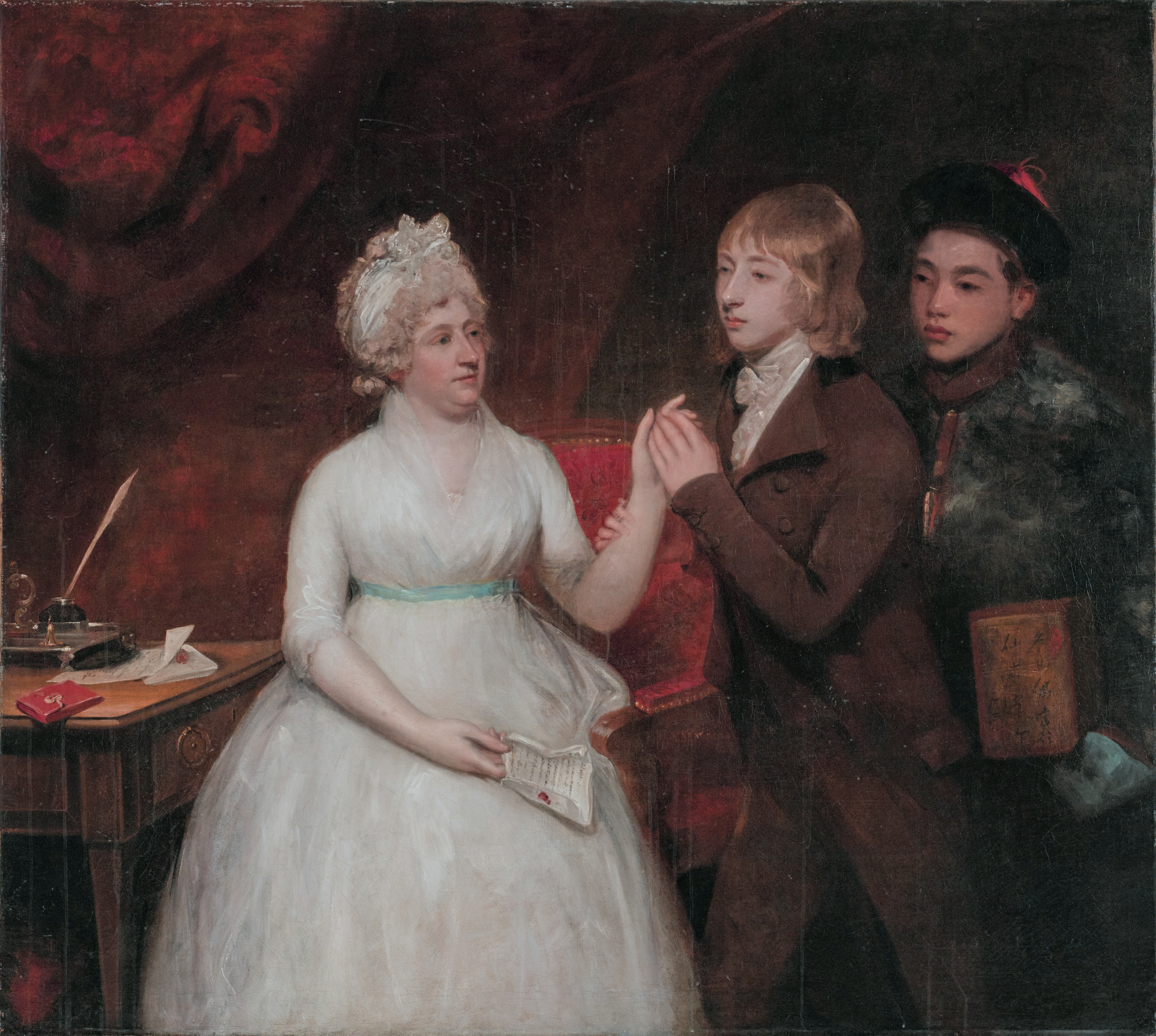
Lady Jane Staunton (d. 1823) with her son, afterwards Sir George Thomas Staunton Bart. (1781–1859), and a Chinese attendant holding a chest of tea. (John Hoppner, circa 1792)

Born at Milford House near Salisbury, he was the son of Sir George Leonard Staunton (1737–1801), first baronet, diplomatist and Orientalist. In 1792, at the age of 12, he accompanied his father, who had been appointed secretary to Lord Macartney's mission to China, to the Far East (1792–1794). Prior to the trip the young George Staunton had begun to learn Chinese alongside Sir John Barrow, 1st Baronet and for the duration was therefore given the role of Page to Lord Macartney. During the mission his Chinese proved good enough to engage in diplomatic banter and he received a personal gift from the Qianlong Emperor. In 1797 he spent two terms at Trinity College, Cambridge.

== In the employ of the East India Company ==
In 1798 was appointed a writer in the British East India Company's factory at Canton (Guangzhou), and subsequently its chief. During this time his knowledge of Chinese increased. In 1805 he translated a work of Dr George Pearson into Chinese. Five years later, he published an English translation of a significant part of the Chinese legal code.

In 1801 he succeeded his father to the baronetcy and in April 1803 was elected a Fellow of the Royal Society.

Many people came to ask for help in both learning the Chinese dialect there and staying, including Robert Morrison and Thomas Manning.

In 1816 Staunton proceeded as second commissioner on the special Amherst Embassy to Beijing with Lord Amherst and Sir Henry Ellis. During the mission he landed in Hong Kong in July 1816. He walked from the shore of Hong Kong to Hong Kong Village via Wong Chuk Hang. After the trip, Wong Chuk Hang was named Staunton Creek and the valley where Hong Kong Village was located was named Staunton Valley. Staunton Creek later became a large sampan slum - it and was eventually cleared and boat people moved into Wong Chuk Hang Estate. Said village was most likely Wong Chuk Hang Lo Wai; only Wong Chuk Hang San Wai still exists at the bottom of Shouson Hill. After the ceding of Hong Kong to Britain, Staunton Street in Central was named after him.

The embassy was unsuccessful - and suffered a serious ship-wreck on the return journey - and shortly afterwards Staunton decided to leave Canton permanently.

== Back in Britain ==
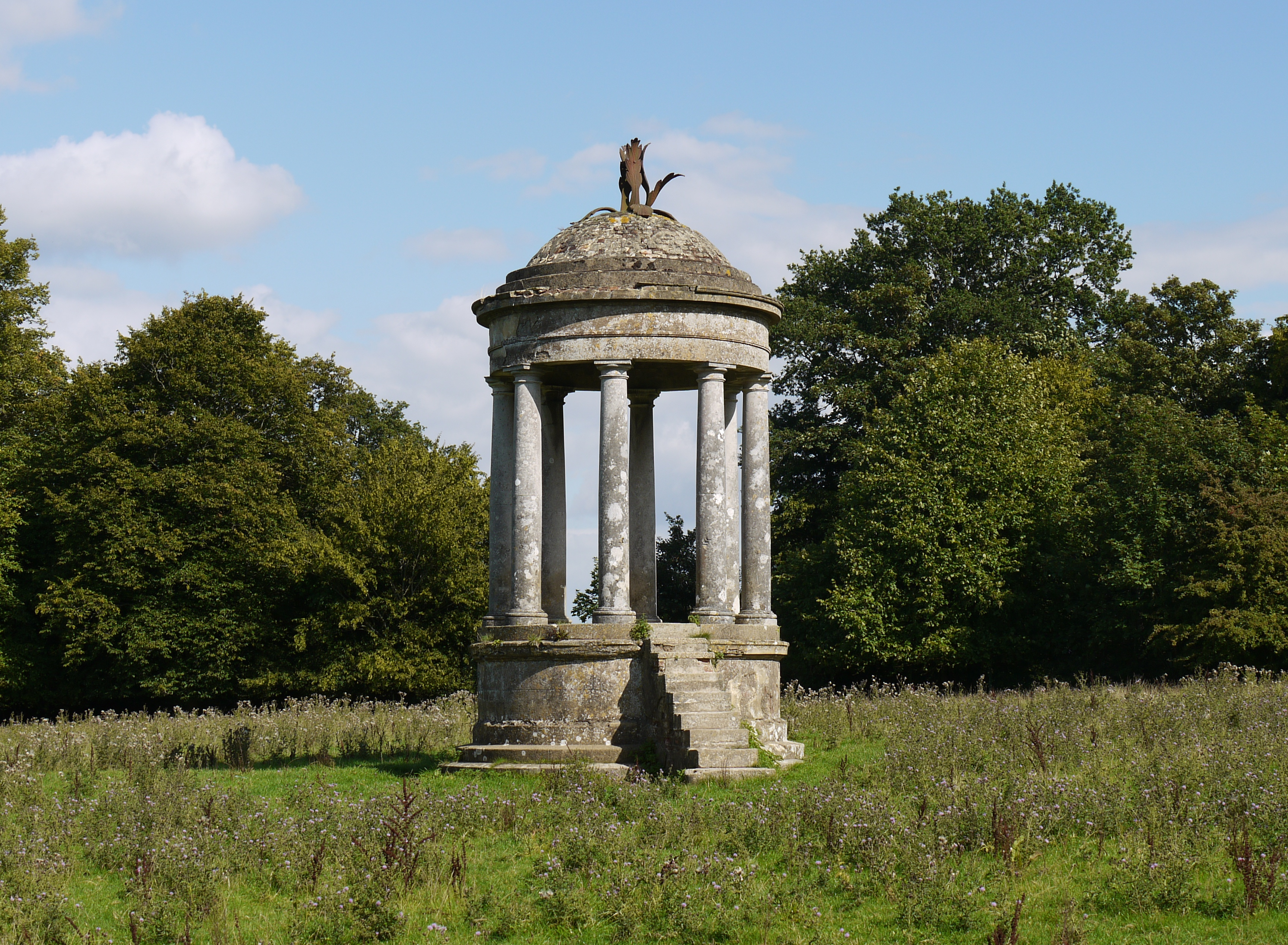
One of the follies that Staunton had built on his Leigh estate

George Staunton had been looking for a country home for some years before his permanent return from China and in 1818 put in a bid for Newstead Abbey but was outbid by Thomas Wildman. In 1820 he purchased the Leigh estate in Hampshire which included what was to become Staunton Country Park. He lived there for part of each year and made substantial alterations to the buildings and the landscape.

Three years later he was heavily involved with the founding of the Royal Asiatic Society of Great Britain and Ireland. Their Sir George Staunton Prize is awarded annually.

Between 1818 and 1852 he was MP for several English constituencies, finally for Portsmouth. He latterly described himself as being during his early years in parliament a liberal Tory who looked to George Canning for leadership. He was a member of the East India Committee, and in 1823, in conjunction with Henry Thomas Colebrooke founded the Royal Asiatic Society.

From 1829 until 1856 he was a member of the Society of Dilettanti.

He had never married and the baronetcy became extinct on his death (in London). He left his Irish estate, Clydagh House, to his eldest cousin George Staunton Lynch (who took the additional surname of Staunton) and Leigh Park and his London house (17, Devonshire Street, Marylebone) to George Staunton Lynch's younger brother, Captain Henry Cormick Lynch.

== Publications ==
His publications include translations of Great Qing Legal Code, known as the Fundamental Laws of China (1810) and of the Narrative of the Chinese Embassy to the Khan of the Tourgouth Tartars (1821); Miscellaneous Notices Relating to China and our Commercial Intercourse with that Country (1822); Notes of Proceedings and Occurrences during the British Embassy to Peking (1824); Observations on our Chinese Commerce (1850). For the Hakluyt Society he edited Juan González de Mendoza's History of the Great and Mighty Kingdom of China.

- González de Mendoza, Juan (1970). Staunton, Sir George Thomas (ed.). The History of the Great and Mighty Kingdom of China and the Situation Thereof, Volume 1. Compiled by Juan González de Mendoza, Sir George Thomas Staunton Contributor Sir George Thomas Staunton (reprint ed.). B. Franklin. ISBN 0833723618.

Parliament of the United Kingdom
Preceded by Lord Binning; Edward Law	Member of Parliament for Mitchell; 1818–1826; With: William Leake 1818–1820; William Taylor Money 1820–1826	Succeeded by William Leake; Henry Labouchere
Preceded by Edward Henry A'Court; Henry Stafford Northcote	Member of Parliament for Heytesbury; 1830–1832; With: Edward Henry A'Court	Constituency abolished
New constituency	Member of Parliament for South Hampshire; 1832–1835; With: The Viscount Palmerston	Succeeded by John Willis Fleming; Henry Combe Compton
Preceded by Francis Baring; John Bonham-Carter	Member of Parliament for Portsmouth; 1838–1852; With: Francis Baring	Succeeded by The Viscount Monck; Francis Baring
Baronetage of Ireland
Preceded by George Staunton	Baronet (of Cargins, Galway); 1801–1851	Extinct
