= Mulan Paddock =

Former imperial hunting ground of the Qing dynasty in present-day Hebei, China

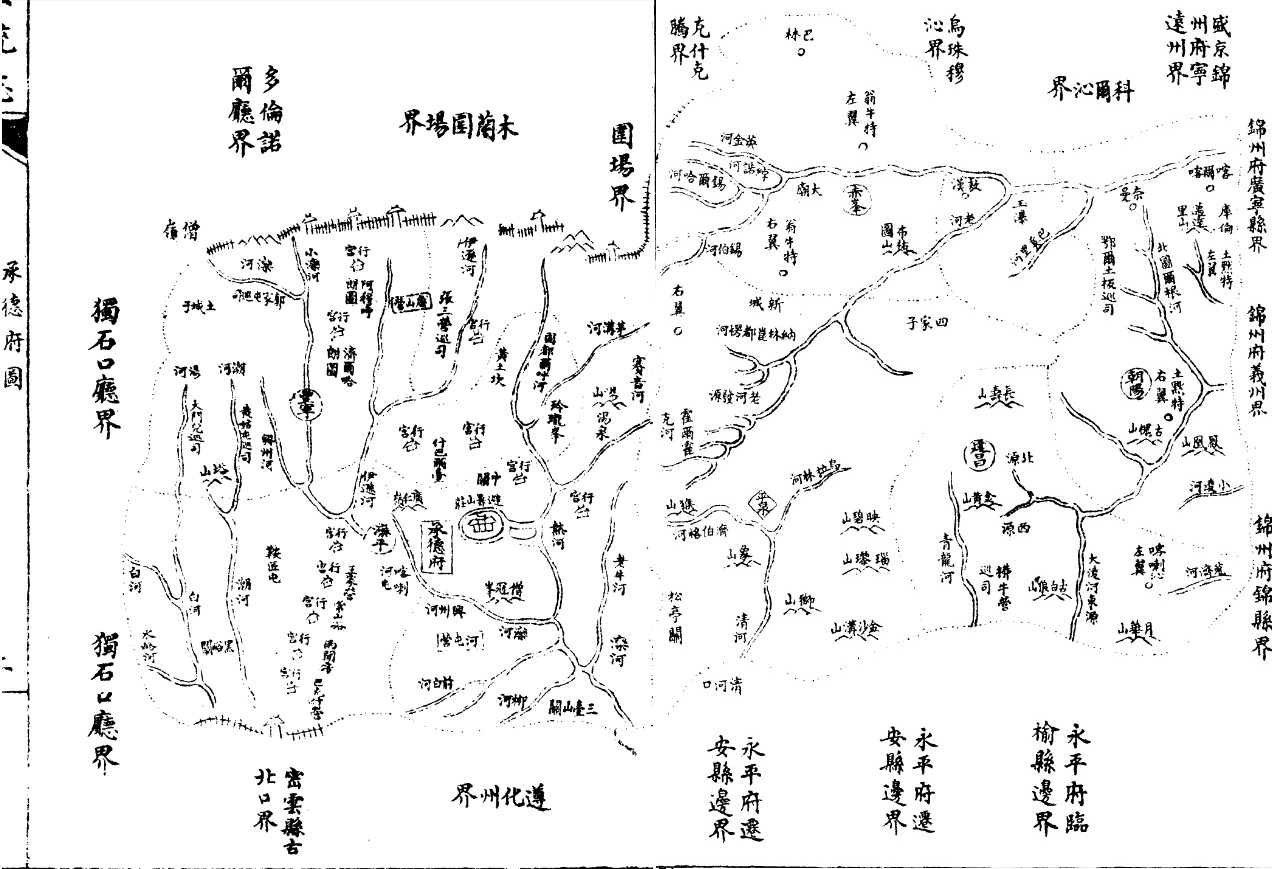
Map of Chengde Fu from Chapter 42, Volume 1, "Chengde Fu I" of the Comprehensive Records of the Great Qing Empire, completed in 1842. Mulan Paddock is located in the upper left.

The Mulan Paddock (Chinese: 木兰围场, Manchu: ᠮᡠᡵᠠᠨ ‍ᡳ
ᡝᠠᠪᠠ, Möllendorff: muran i aba, Abkai: muran-i aba) was an imperial hunting ground of the Qing dynasty, and from the reign of the Kangxi Emperor onward, the site where the Mulan autumn hunt ceremony was held by the Qing imperial court. It was originally called Xing'an (兴安), and was located north of Chengde Prefecture, on the border between present-day Chengde, Hebei, and Inner Mongolia Autonomous Region, centred on present-day Weichang Manchu and Mongol Autonomous County.

== Naming ==
"Mulan" (木兰) is the Manchu word for "deer whistling". Another account holds that "Mulan" is a homophonic rendering of the Manchu word "huihan" (辉罕), which translates into Chinese as "deer whistling" (哨鹿). "Deer whistling" was originally a Manchu hunting custom, in which the hunter used a whistle to imitate the "you-you" (呦呦) mating call of a stag in order to hunt it. "Deer whistling" itself was a hunting method with a clearly defined procedure, distinct from the driven hunt known as "xing wei" (行围, encirclement hunting). As recorded by Zhaolian in his Xiaoting Zalu (啸亭杂录): "Upon spotting a herd of deer, [the Emperor] would order an attendant to raise a decoy deer head and make the 'you-you' call, to draw in a doe (Note: A doe refers to an adult female deer.); [he] would then swiftly loose an arrow to kill it and drink its blood, which was believed not only to prolong life and strengthen the body, but also to be a form of training in hardship." "Weichang" (translated as "paddock" or "hunting ground") means, in a literal translation, "an enclosed area for hunting".

In Chinese-language historical records predating the reign of the Qianlong Emperor, only the terms "deer whistling" and "Mulan" appear. In documents from the Kangxi era, the term "Mulan Weichang" would more accurately be translated as "the place of deer whistling". In the broad sense, the Mulan Paddock (or "deer-whistling paddock") encompassed numerous hunting grounds north of the Great Wall beyond the capital. The Mulan Paddock centred on present-day Weichang Manchu and Mongol Autonomous County took shape and became fixed during the reign of the Qianlong Emperor.

== History ==
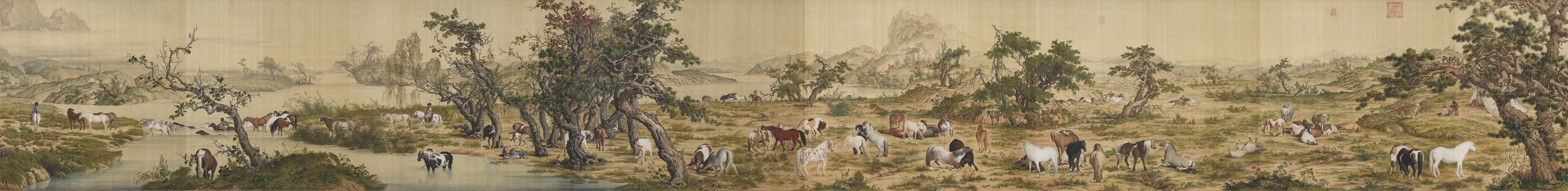
One Hundred Horses, painted by Giuseppe Castiglione, depicts the Mulan Paddock in the sixth year of the Yongzheng era (1728). Contemporary researchers believe the background depicts the various hunting grounds along the escarpment transition zone of the Mulan Paddock, located near the line from present-day Banjieta Town to Shizhuozi Township in Weichang Manchu and Mongol Autonomous County.

=== Founding ===
During the reign of the Kangxi Emperor of the Qing dynasty, the area of present-day Weichang Manchu and Mongol Autonomous County in Chengde, Hebei, and its surroundings, was pastureland belonging to the Southern Mongols. The Daguangdingzi Mountain in present-day Chaoyangwan Town, Weichang Manchu and Mongol Autonomous County, was at the time known as the Great Xing'an Range, and the area came to be called Xing'an.

In the 16th year of the Kangxi Emperor's reign (1677), the Kangxi Emperor departed through Xifengkou on his first northern tour beyond the frontier. In the fourth month of the 20th year of Kangxi's reign (1681), the Kangxi Emperor again departed through Xifengkou on his second northern tour beyond the frontier. Nobles of the Kharchin, Ongniud, Aohan, Tümed, and Naiman tribes came in succession to pay their respects to the Kangxi Emperor. On the 22nd day of the fourth month, at the open plain north of Dashierkabuqi'er Pass (Note: "Dashierkabuqi'er Pass" is a Mongolian place name; "kabuqi'er" means "mountain pass" or "cliff".) (present-day Dajikou, Pingquan, Chengde), the Emperor set up a yellow imperial tent and held a great banquet, bestowing gifts upon Zhaxi, Prince of the Kharchin tribe, and 1,884 others. The Kangxi qiju zhu (Diary of Activity and Repose of the Kangxi Emperor) records: "because [they] had gone ahead to survey the terrain and select a suitable site for the paddock, and had shown diligence in this task, [they] were therefore rewarded accordingly." The 1980 book Chengde: The Mountain Resort for Escaping the Heat, along with scholars such as Yan Chongnian, generally take this passage to establish that "the 22nd day of the fourth month of the 20th year of the Kangxi era is the date on which the Kangxi Emperor established the Mulan Paddock."

Scholars who dispute the "establishment in the 20th year of Kangxi's reign" theory argue that the "paddock" referred to in the phrase "select a suitable site for the paddock" in the Kangxi qiju zhu was not the Mulan Paddock, but merely "the Mongol nobles' selection of a hunting ground for the Emperor," unrelated to the Mulan Paddock. Some researchers have pointed out that the "20th year of Kangxi" theory, first proposed in the book Chengde: The Mountain Resort for Escaping the Heat, actually arose from the coincidental similarity between two place names within present-day Pingquan — where the Kangxi Emperor had stopped — and place names within the Mulan Paddock (Note: Among the places where the Kangxi Emperor stopped were locations named "Xierha River" and "Baicha". Within the Mulan Paddock there is a "Xierha River," and north of the Mulan Paddock, in Keshiketeng Banner, there is a "Baicha." The "Xierha River" [where the Emperor stopped] is the present-day Xihe River in Pingquan, located in the central part of Pingquan. "Baicha" is a Mongolian word meaning "immortal" or "deity," and it is unclear today which mountain this originally referred to. Contemporary researchers believe it must have been in the northern part of present-day Pingquan.). At the time, the Kangxi Emperor and his retinue were hunting and touring within present-day Pingquan at a pace of "twenty to thirty li, or thirty to forty li" per day — far short of "several hundred li a day" — making it unlikely that they had entered the territory of the Mulan Paddock.

In the summer of the 22nd year of the Kangxi era (1683), the Kangxi Emperor and his grandmother, the Grand Empress Dowager Zhaosheng, left the capital to escape the summer heat, on what was the Kangxi Emperor's third northern tour beyond the frontier — the first occasion on which he stopped at Xing'an.

During the reign of the Qianlong Emperor, as borders were delineated, administration strengthened, and the autumn hunt formalised into institutional ritual, the Mulan Paddock became a place name with reduced extent and clearly defined boundaries.

=== Land reclamation in the late Qing and Republican periods ===
From the 1st year of the Tongzhi era (1862) to the 6th year of Tongzhi (1867), Ruilin, the Rehe Commander-in-Chief, memorialised the throne requesting that the paddock be opened for reclamation. A total of 4,387 qing of land were reclaimed, encompassing 31 of the 72 formally designated hunting grounds within the Mulan Paddock; this is historically known as the "first reclamation."

In the 2nd year of the Guangxu era (1876), Weichang Subprefecture was established from the Mulan Paddock. In the 28th year of Guangxu (1902), the Weichang Reclamation Bureau spent three months surveying and allocating more than 2,690 qing of paddock wasteland across five river valleys. Only 35 complete hunting grounds remained across the entire territory, and, including the wasteland outside the hunting-ground boundaries, there were roughly seven thousand qing of cultivable land in total. This second wave of reclamation is historically known as "opening the new paddock."

In the 31st year of the Guangxu era (1905), the Qing imperial court approved a memorial from the Office of Military Training requesting the opening of the paddock, and the remaining hunting grounds were entirely reclaimed as well. That year, Yuan Shikai reported in a memorial that "from the 31st to the 33rd years of Guangxu, over one hundred thousand pieces of timber in total were felled." By this time, as timber within the Mulan Paddock was "continuously felled and transported away, raccoon dogs, foxes, elaphures, and deer had nowhere left to hide, such that one could travel through numerous hunting grounds without sighting a single one."

From the 1st year of the Republic of China (1912) to the 5th year of the Republic (1916), a further six thousand-odd qing of land were reclaimed; this is historically known as the "third reclamation."

=== People's Republic of China period ===
In 1949, the year the People's Republic of China was founded, the natural forest of the Mulan Paddock covered 720,000 mu, with a forest coverage rate of 5%.

== Geography ==
Deer Whistling, painted by Giuseppe Castiglione, depicts the scene of the Qianlong Emperor's first Mulan autumn hunt, in the sixth year of the Qianlong era (1741). Contemporary researchers believe the background depicts the various hunting grounds along the escarpment transition zone of the Mulan Paddock, located near the line from present-day Banjieta Town to Shizhuozi Township.

The Mulan Paddock measures 125 kilometres from east to west and 122 kilometres from north to south, with a total area of over ten thousand square kilometres. Besides encompassing the entirety of present-day Weichang Manchu and Mongol Autonomous County in Chengde, Hebei, it also includes parts of the neighbouring Longhua County and Fengning Manchu Autonomous County, as well as parts of Duolun County in Xilingol League and Keshiketeng Banner in Chifeng, Inner Mongolia Autonomous Region.

On the original site of the Mulan Paddock, there are today the Saihanba National Forest Park (Saihanba Mechanized Forest Farm, Hebei), the Hongsongwa Natural Landscape Reserve, and the Yudaokou Grassland and Forest Scenic Area (Yudaokou Pasture Management Zone). In addition, within Weichang Manchu and Mongol Autonomous County there are also the Hebei Mulan Paddock National Forest Park and the Luanhe Shangyou National Nature Reserve (formerly known as the Mulan Paddock Nature Reserve), as well as two provincial-level forest parks, Aobao Mountain and Nandatian.

=== Landform ===
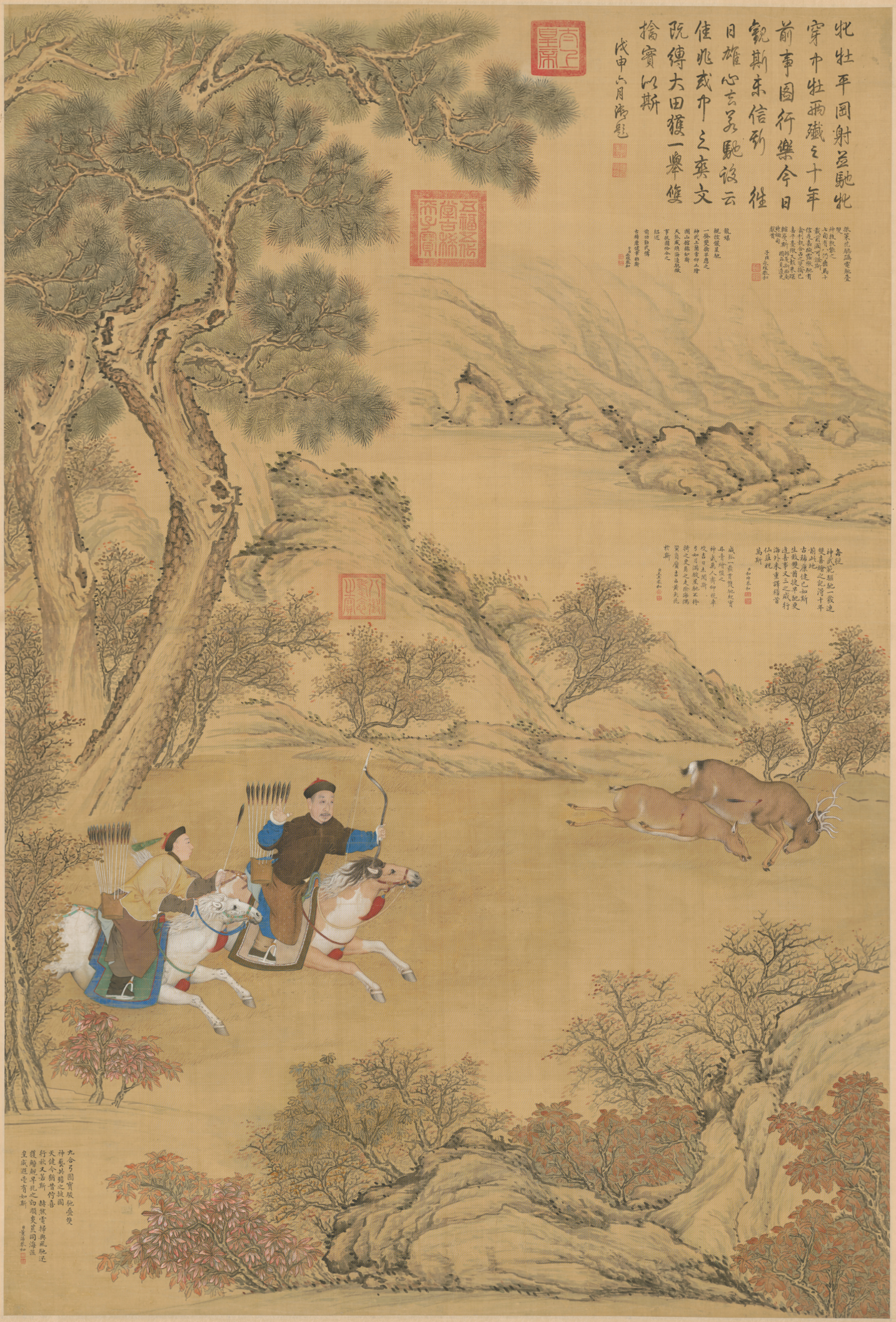
The Qianlong Emperor Felling Two Deer with One Arrow, painted by Ignatius Sichelbarth, depicts a scene of the Qianlong Emperor conducting the Mulan autumn hunt in his later years. Contemporary researchers believe the background depicts the various hunting grounds along the escarpment transition zone of the Mulan Paddock, located near the line from present-day Banjieta Town to Shizhuozi Township.

The Mulan Paddock lies in the transitional zone between the Inner Mongolian Plateau and the mountainous region of northern Hebei, and is divided into three topographic zones: below the escarpment, the escarpment transition zone, and above the escarpment. The various hunting grounds of the escarpment transition zone lie near the line from present-day Banjieta Town to Shizhuozi Township in Weichang Manchu and Mongol Autonomous County. In addition, three townships along this line are Daobazi Township, Pailou Township and Datoushan Township, along with two forest farms under the Hebei Mulan Paddock State-owned Forest Farm — the Beigou Forest Farm and the Mengluan Forest Farm.

The average elevation is around 1,500 metres. The climate is transitional between the mid-temperate and cold-temperate zones, and between semi-arid and semi-humid conditions, forming a continental, monsoonal, plateau-mountain climate. Summer is not pronounced; present-day Weichang Manchu and Mongol Autonomous County has no pentad (five-day period) with an average temperature above 22 °C.

=== Individual hunting grounds ===
The Mulan Paddock was further subdivided into numerous smaller hunting grounds (also referred to as weichang, xiaowei, or weizuo). There were no clear boundaries between the smaller hunting grounds, and most were named after local natural features, predominantly in Mongolian. Yong'an Mangka and Yong'an Pai are the only two smaller hunting grounds named in Manchu.As for the number of smaller hunting grounds, one account holds that there were originally 67, later increased by five, commonly giving the figure of 72. On a Qing-dynasty official Manchu-language map of the Mulan Paddock preserved at the Beijing Library, 72 smaller hunting grounds are labelled in the Manchu script. Notably, this map does not label the Eastern Temple (the Shrine of the Great Xing'an Range) or the Western Temple, both of which were built during the Jiaqing era. On this basis, contemporary researcher Sun Guoqing has surmised that the map was drawn before the 16th year of the Jiaqing era (1811).

The Chengde Fu Zhi (Records of Chengde Prefecture) compiled during the Daoguang era, Volume 26 of the preliminary chapters, states, "there are in total sixty-seven hunting grounds." The Guangxu-era edition of the Comprehensive Records of the Great Qing Empire also records sixty-seven. Sun Guoqing holds that, beginning in the Daoguang era, a number of the smaller hunting grounds "fell into disuse and disappeared over time," which is why the recorded number of hunting grounds decreased in documents from after the Daoguang era. In 1978 and 1979, the Hebei Provincial Cultural Relics Administration and other bodies conducted field surveys, confirming that there had been 72 hunting grounds in the early Qing period. Some researchers have pointed out that the names of 80 smaller hunting grounds can be identified with certainty.
