= Sidaogou =

Sidaogou (四道沟) could refer to the following locations in China:

- Sidaogou, Linjiang, town in Linjiang in southern Jilin
- Sidaogou Township, Weichang County, in Weichang Manchu and Mongol Autonomous County, Hebei
