= Imperial hunt of the Qing dynasty =

Annual rite in Qing dynasty China

The Imperial Hunt
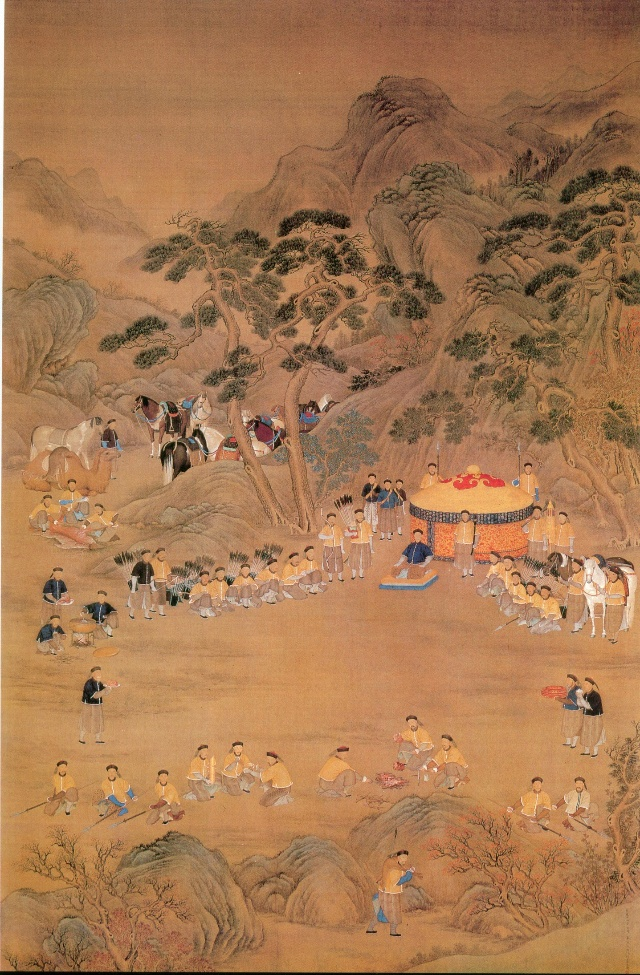
- The Qianlong Emperor on a hunting trip

Chinese name
- Traditional Chinese: 秋獮
- Simplified Chinese: 秋狝
- Literal meaning: the autumn hunt
Transcriptions
Standard Mandarin
- Hanyu Pinyin: qiūxiǎn
- Wade–Giles: ch’iu^{1}-hsien^{3}

Manchu name
- Manchu script: ᠮᡠᡵᠠᠨ ᡳ ᠠᠪᠠ
- Möllendorff: muran-i aba

The imperial hunt of the Qing dynasty was an annual rite of the emperors of China's Qing dynasty. It was first organized in 1681 by the Kangxi Emperor at the imperial hunting grounds at Mulan (modern-day Weichang Manchu and Mongol Autonomous County, near what would become the summer residence of the Qing emperors at Chengde). Starting in 1683 the event was held annually at Mulan during the autumn, lasting up to a month. The Qing dynasty hunt was a synthesis of earlier Han and Inner Asian hunting traditions, particularly those of the Manchus and Mongols. The emperor himself participated in the hunt, along with thousands of soldiers, imperial family members, and government officials.

The Manchu emperors of the Qing dynasty used the hunt as a military exercise to train their troops in the traditional martial skills of archery and horsemanship. The hunt was also a bonding ritual intended to emphasize the shared Inner Asian martial traditions of the Manchu and Mongol soldiers of the Eight Banners who were selected to participate; Han troops were excluded from the hunt. The event provided an opportunity for Qing emperors to leave the confines of the Forbidden City in Beijing and return to the forests "north of the wall", closer to their ancestral homelands, where they could hunt and live as their ancestors did. As the Manchus grew accustomed to living in Chinese cities, Qing emperors expanded and ritualized the imperial hunt as a sort of invented tradition, using it to preserve the traditional Manchu way of life. The Qianlong Emperor made it a key element of his effort to halt the steady decline of military discipline within the Eight Banners during his reign.

Each year, for the duration of the hunt, Mulan served as a temporary capital and a venue for diplomatic activities. The Qianlong Emperor required the leaders of Inner Asian tributary states to join in the hunt on a rotating basis, and he frequently received foreign emissaries there rather than in the imperial palace at Beijing. To facilitate the continued operation of the imperial government in the emperor's absence, many government officials accompanied the emperor to Mulan, where they lived and worked in a tent city replicating the layout of the Forbidden City, exchanging correspondence regularly with Beijing and Chengde.

Altogether, the Kangxi, Qianlong, and Jiaqing Emperors participated in 91 hunts during their reigns. As an important element of Qing military culture, and an embodiment of Manchu identity, the Qing imperial hunt featured regularly in the official artwork and poetry of the Qing dynasty. It was the subject of several paintings by Giuseppe Castiglione, the Italian Jesuit who served as a court painter to Qianlong. Images of the hunt, much like images commemorating victories in battle and other military subjects, were regularly commissioned by the imperial court as a form of propaganda, portraying Qing emperors as exemplars of traditional martial (wu) values.

== Origins ==
=== Chinese ===
Hunting has been an important element of Chinese elite identity since at least the Zhou dynasty. Hunting, warfare, and animal sacrifice were intimately linked in the culture of the Zhou aristocracy. As Chinese society became progressively more agrarian, hunting was transformed into a ritual activity associated with the elite. Because the bow and arrow were used both for hunting and for waging war, the practice of archery became a defining trait of the proper gentleman of the Zhou period. A common theme throughout Chinese history is the juxtaposition of hunting and warfare. As one Zhou dynasty writer put it:

Therefore one uses the spring hunt, the summer hunt, the autumn hunt, and the winter hunt, all in the intervals between agricultural labor, to practice the [great] services. Every three years there should be a review of the troops... The lord does not shoot any bird or beast whose flesh is not offered in the sacrificial pots or whose hide, teeth, bones, horns, fur, or feathers are not used on the sacrificial vessels.

In the classic 14th century novel Romance of the Three Kingdoms, Chancellor Cao Cao of the Han dynasty states: "The kings and emperors of ancient times held four grand hunts yearly, riding forth from the capital each season to show the world their prowess." These four seasonal hunts were the spring hunt (Chinese: 春蒐; pinyin: chūnsōu), summer hunt (Chinese: 夏苗; pinyin: xiàmiáo), autumn hunt, and winter hunt (Chinese: 冬狩; pinyin: dōngshòu). Such ritual hunts were regular events in the Tang dynasty, and were sometimes criticized for their extravagance. Emperors, however, saw hunting as an important military exercise. Emperor Taizong of Tang defended his frequent hunting, saying: "At present the empire is without trouble, but military preparations cannot be forgotten."

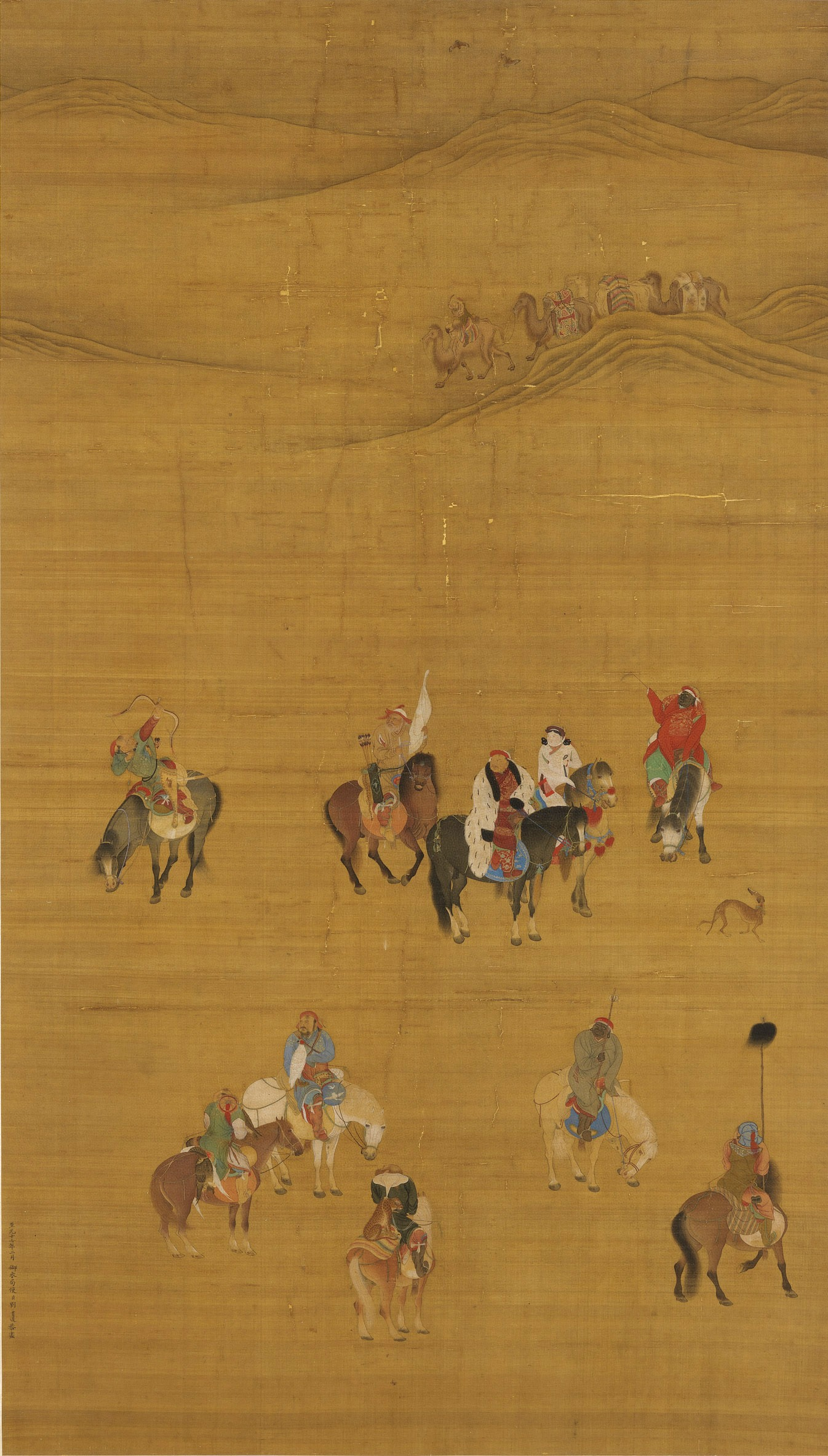
Kublai Khan out hunting

=== Inner Asian ===
Although it was known by the same Chinese name (qiuxian) as the autumn hunts of Chinese antiquity, the autumn hunt of the Qing dynasty was more directly influenced by the hunting practices of the Inner Asian horse cultures. The Manchus who conquered the Ming dynasty and founded the Qing were themselves part of that tradition. The Qing empire encompassed not only Manchus but also Mongols, Turkic peoples, and other steppe nomads. Like the Mongols of the Yuan dynasty and the Khitans of the Liao dynasty, the Manchus of the Qing practiced a form of battue hunting, in which groups of soldiers would encircle a large area of forest and drive their prey into clearings where they could be shot. This style of hunting was called aba in Manchu.

As recorded by Marco Polo, Kublai Khan had a hunting preserve near his summer capital at Xanadu (Shangdu). The khan hunted there regularly during his reign. Mongol and Khitan khans considered hunting an important form of military training, and practiced it regularly. For steppe nomads like themselves, hunting was still an important part of daily life, and not just an idle pursuit of the upper classes as it had become among the Han Chinese. Emperor Taizong of the Khitan Liao dynasty echoed Emperor Taizong of Tang when he remarked, "Our hunting is not merely the pursuit of enjoyment, but a means of practicing warfare!"

The Jurchens of the Jin dynasty, ancestors of the Manchus, organized their military units along the same lines as their hunting parties. This practice was carried on by the Manchus. From these units emerged the companies, called niru ("arrow"), that formed the basic building blocks of the Eight Banners military system that went on to conquer China. The pre-conquest Manchus participated frequently in organized hunts. In 1630, before the capture of Beijing, Hong Taiji established a hunting ground near the old Qing capital of Mukden (Shenyang). However, it was his grandson the Kangxi Emperor who would start the tradition of regular annual hunts.

== Mulan hunting preserve ==
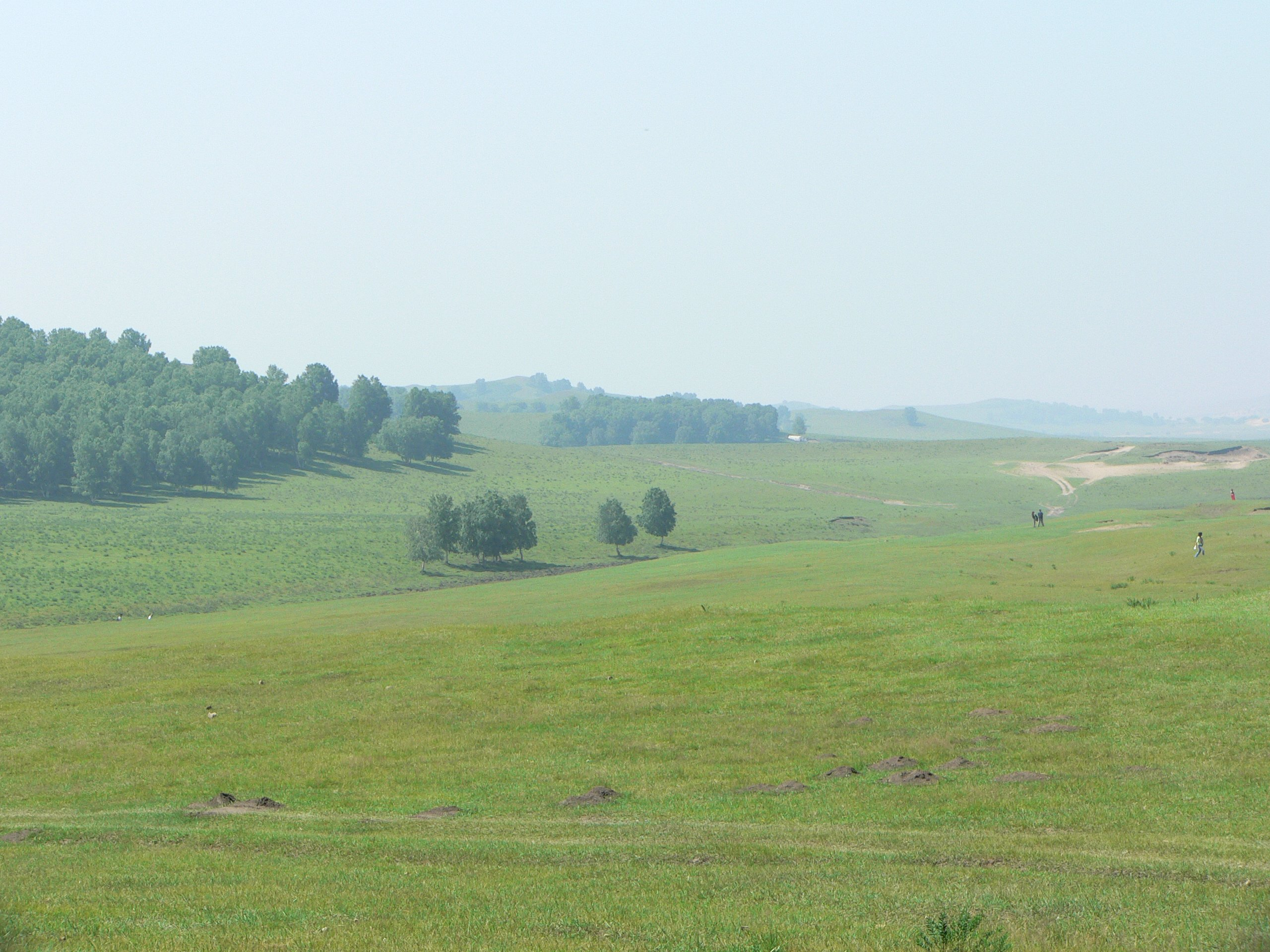
Saihanba National Forest Park, which encompasses part of the old hunting grounds

=== Establishment ===
The tradition of hunting at Mulan in the autumn came about as the result of Kangxi's 1681 hunting expedition in lands belonging to his Mongol allies, near the site of the former Yuan capital Shangdu. These lands were gifted to Kangxi at the end of his visit. In 1683, Kangxi returned to hunt again and the lands were established as an official hunting preserve, and bounded by a willow palisade.

=== Environment ===
The hunting preserve was located in Rehe (Jehol) province, which has since been divided among the provinces of Hebei, Liaoning, and Inner Mongolia. It occupied a densely forested area where Mongols had hunted for generations. The area contained 67 clearings, called hoihan in Manchu, that animals could be driven into as part of the aba hunt. These clearings usually had Mongolian names, reflecting the area's history as a traditional Mongol hunting ground. For much of its history, it was known simply as "the hunting ground at Rehe". The Chinese name Mulan (Chinese: 木兰; pinyin: Mùlán) is a phonetic translation of the Manchu term muran, which refers to a hunting method in which hunters would whistle for deer, using decoy deer heads as a lure. An 1807 inscription by the Jiaqing Emperor refers to the hunting preserve as Mulan/Muran, and today the area is called Mulan Weichang (Chinese: 木兰围场; pinyin: Mùlán Wéichǎng). It is located in Weichang Manchu and Mongol Autonomous County in Hebei.

During the Kangxi era, plentiful game was to be found at Mulan. The emperor was able to hunt not only deer, but also tigers, bears, leopards, and wolves. Qing emperors enjoyed the beauty of the natural environment, and the escape it provided them from urban life in the capital. As Kangxi wrote:

I am fine. Right now there is no business. At this cool place outside the passes, everyone, from soldiers down to errand-runners, has set up their tents. We've been living here eating game and fish from the mountains and rivers. At night I cover myself with just a cotton blanket. The rainfall has been just right. My mind and heart are tranquil.

Lord Macartney, who visited the Qianlong Emperor at Rehe in 1793 during the Macartney Embassy, gave the following account of the area:

It is one of the finest forest scenes in the world, wild, woody, mountainous and rocky, abounding with stags and deer of different species, and most of the other beasts of chace, not dangerous to man... In many places immense woods, chiefly oaks, pines, and chestnuts, grow upon perpendicular steeps... These woods often clamber over the loftiest pinnacles of the stony hills or, gathering on the skirts of them, descend with a rapid sweep and bury themselves in the deepest vallies.

Within the preserve Macartney also found "palaces, banquetting houses, and monasteries," accessed by roads "hewn out of the living rock". From a hilltop pavilion, he saw around him "so rich, so various, so beautiful, so sublime a prospect [his] eyes had ever beheld". In the later years of the Qianlong era and in the Jiaqing era, however, illegal poaching and logging in the preserve became a serious issue. Jiaqing observed in the early 1800s that the damage to the local ecosystem had made it very difficult to hunt there.

=== Administration ===
In 1705, the Kangxi Emperor created a hunting office within the Eight Banners to manage the preserve at Mulan. The headquarters of its Chief Controller was located in Chengde. All but one of the officials who held this position were Manchus, the one exception being a Mongol. In 1749, responsibility over Mulan was given over to the Lifan Yuan, which supervised the Qing dynasty's Mongolian dependencies. The Qianlong Emperor increased the number of officials at Mulan in 1753. During his reign, the number of hunting guards increased from 191 to 800. The number again increased to 950 under the Jiaqing Emperor. Hunting guards at Mulan were selected among bannermen from the capital, and were responsible for preventing poaching, squatting, and illegal logging, as well as for managing the wildlife in Mulan's sixty-seven (later seventy-two) hunting zones. With few exceptions, all permanent construction was banned in the preserve. In 1764, responsibility for Mulan was given back to the Eight Banners, under the lieutenant general of the Rehe garrison. Throughout its history, the administration of the Mulan preserve was staffed entirely with Manchus and Mongols.

== History ==
=== Kangxi era ===
The first hunt at Mulan was in 1681, when the Kangxi Emperor hunted there as a guest of his Mongol allies. With him on that occasion were 3,000 Mongol riders, a small number of bannermen of the Eight Banners, and a retinue of officials from Beijing. After receiving the land as a gift from the Mongols, Kangxi hunted there each year starting with his second visit in 1683. Participation in the hunt was expanded to include troops from the Eight Banners of Beijing and the Banner garrisons of Nanjing, Hangzhou, Jingzhou, and Xi'an. The best archers and riders of each garrison were selected to participate, based on their performance on tests earlier in the year. Only Manchu and Mongol bannermen could be selected, reflecting the hunt's Inner Asian character. Hunts were large-scale affairs involving thousands of participants; in addition to bannermen, there were Mongol princes and government officials present. Kangxi had delicacies such as strawberries grown near the grounds so they could be enjoyed by his hunting party.

The construction of the Chengde Mountain Resort in Rehe began during Kangxi's reign. The resort was established as a summer residence for the Qing emperors. Its location was north of the Great Wall, halfway between the wall and the hunting grounds at Mulan. Each year, the emperor would depart Chengde during the autumn and travel with his entourage to Mulan, a distance of seventy-five miles. Although Chengde was said to be a place to escape the heat of Beijing in the summer, in fact Kangxi usually stayed there into autumn, and sometimes returned in the winter.

Except when he was away on campaign, Kangxi hunted annually at Mulan until his death in 1722. In his later years, Kangxi insisted on continuing to hunt, despite needing to be carried in a sedan chair. Kangxi's son, the Yongzheng Emperor, never hunted at Mulan as an emperor, though he had done so as a prince. Yongzheng regretted his failure to continue the custom, and instructed his sons to maintain their hunting skills.

=== Qianlong era ===
The next emperor to hunt at Mulan was Qianlong, who revived and expanded his grandfather's tradition. Mulan held deep significance for Qianlong, who erected a stele there in 1751. Concerned about the disappearance of traditional Manchu ways in his generation, he wrote to one of his generals, "From the third year [of my reign] the former institution of the regular training hunt will be begun. Only then will I know whether you have truly practiced as you have preached." From the emperor's point of view, the hunt was the only way to maintain the skills of his troops at shooting from horseback.

The Qianlong Emperor held over forty hunts in his reign, and received foreign dignitaries at Chengde when he was away from the capital. Hunts were usually cancelled in years when the emperor visited the imperial tombs at Mukden, or for important diplomatic events. The visits to Chengde of Amursana in 1754, the Sixth Panchen Lama in 1780, and Lord Macartney in 1793 all resulted in such cancellations. As a venue for such visits, Chengde's location north of the wall and its proximity to the hunting grounds emphasized the Inner Asian heritage of the Manchus and made it the ideal location to receive emissaries from the societies of Central Asia.

=== Jiaqing era ===
Like his father Qianlong, the Jiaqing Emperor considered the Mulan hunt to be of vital importance. The inscription of his 1807 stele ("Record of Mulan") at the hunting preserve, placed near that of his father, stated that "Mulan is our nation's hunting ground." Jiaqing reaffirmed the hunt's importance as both a representation of Manchu identity and as a form of military training. Acknowledging that his own riding and shooting skills were probably inferior to those of his father, he proclaimed, "I surely will not take up idle, leisurely ways." In the final words of his inscription, the Jiaqing Emperor wrote:

Can the son who is heir to the house betray the aims of his ancestors? Hunting at Muran in the autumn is the eternal way that must not be forgotten, but preserved for all time by generation after generation of sons and grandsons.

Jiaqing, however, was the last emperor to hunt regularly at Mulan. His son, the Daoguang Emperor, discontinued the practice after ascending the throne, and no more hunts would occur thereafter.

== Events and activities ==
=== Journey from Beijing ===
Qing dynasty map of Chengde Mountain Resort

In the early years of the Kangxi era, before the construction of the Chengde complex at his behest, the emperor would travel directly to Mulan in the fall. Kangxi's entourage lived off the land, hunting and camping along the route to Mulan. The emperor wrote of roasting venison over an open fire, and making tea with melted snow. On his 1711 trip, after construction had begun at Chengde, it is estimated that 12,000 people may have accompanied him from the resort. During Qianlong's reign, the emperor's usual practice was to first go to Chengde in the summer, and then proceed to the hunting grounds later in the year. Before departing for Chengde, the emperor and the imperial family would participate in ceremonies in Beijing. Tibetan lamas were present to pray for the success of the hunt. The emperor would usually return to Beijing just after the end of the hunting season. The trip to Chengde from Beijing took seven days, with the emperor and his large entourage stopping at lodges stationed along the way. According to Lord Macartney, whose party took this route to reach Chengde in 1793, each day's segment of the trip was short enough to be completed by mid-day or afternoon. Macartney estimated the distance from Beijing to be about 131.5 miles.

There were two parallel roads between Beijing and Chengde, one for the emperor and one for other authorized persons. While traveling the route, Macartney observed a large number of troops repairing the road in anticipation of the emperor's return trip to Beijing. The road was known to become muddy after heavy summer rains, as observed by the Jesuit painter Jean Denis Attiret. It crossed several rivers, at which bridges or ferries were provided. In some areas, Macartney found the road "very rough" and difficult to travel. Along the route were guard posts at approximately five mile intervals, each staffed by a handful of soldiers to provide security.

=== Hunting ===
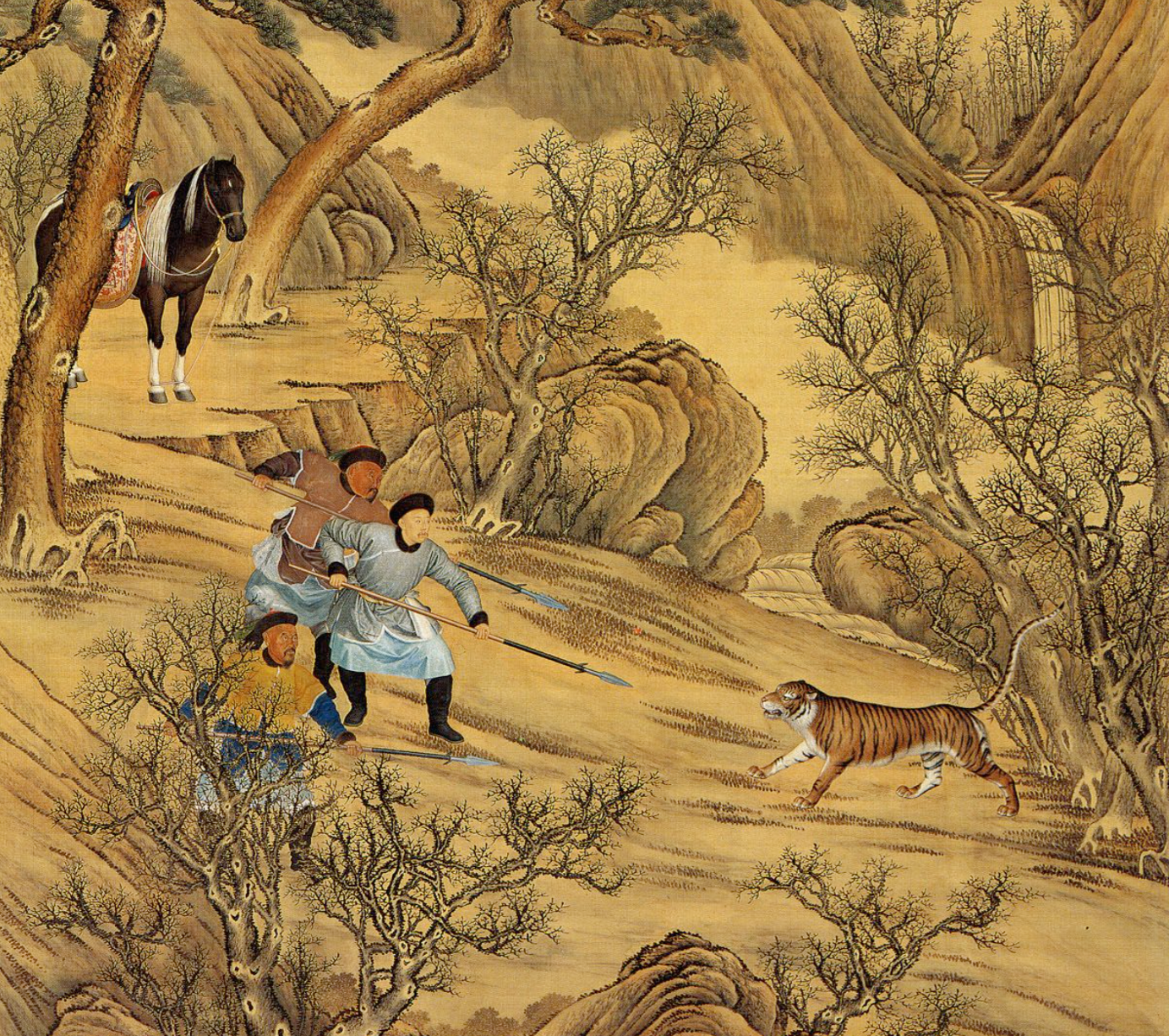
Detail from Hongli Spearing a Tiger

Scheduled hunting activities at Mulan included both the eponymous muran variety as well as large-scale aba hunts. Several thousand soldiers were required for the aba hunt. A temporary imperial camp would be placed north of the hunting site. On the day of the hunt, the participants would be split into a left wing and a right wing, arrayed in two semi-circular groups spread out over a distance of several miles. Once the two semi-circles had joined, the wing leaders would order the men to close in. The circle would then be reduced to a size of two or three li in circumference, gathering the prey within.

The emperor, having arrived at the campsite by this point, entered the enclosure on horseback and had the honor of the first shot. To protect him from potentially dangerous game such as bears or tigers, the emperor would be accompanied by a number of troops such as the "tiger-gun brigade". If a tiger was caught, the emperor usually killed it personally, as part of the spectacle demonstrating the bravery and martial skill of the imperial lineage. In 1692, the Kangxi Emperor killed a bear by wounding it with an arrow and finishing it off with a pike. Under the Kangxi Emperor, tiger hunts were conducted by having captive animals brought in cages, and then releasing them into the hunting grounds.

=== Official business ===
While the emperor was hunting at Mulan, the business of government continued. The "traveling camp" of the imperial government was arranged so as to mirror the layout of the government offices around the Forbidden City. Messengers relayed information between Beijing, the Chengde resort, and Mulan, allowing the emperors and his entourage of imperial officials to do their work in the field. According to one official, there were no desks in the tents, and work had to be done by candlelight.

=== Entertainment ===
At the end of the hunting season, the emperor held a feast for all participants, followed by a special feast just for Mongol and Uyghur leaders. Such events were an opportunity for the emperor to spend time with his Inner Asian subjects, many of whom did not travel south to China proper for fear of smallpox. In addition to banquets, the emperor also presented and received gifts, and gave out titles. Many entertainments were provided, including archery and wrestling contests, as well as mock battles. Lord Macartney, in his 1793 mission, observed wrestling, acrobatics, juggling, theatre, and fireworks displays, but was disappointed that an expected display of feats of horsemanship did not appear, as he had heard that the "Tartars", as he called them, were quite skilled in such arts. During the performances, Macartney noted that the audience was completely silent. Macartney, eager to get on with his diplomatic mission, was nonetheless obliged by court etiquette to watch these displays and receive gifts from the emperor throughout the day.

== Political significance ==
=== Propaganda ===
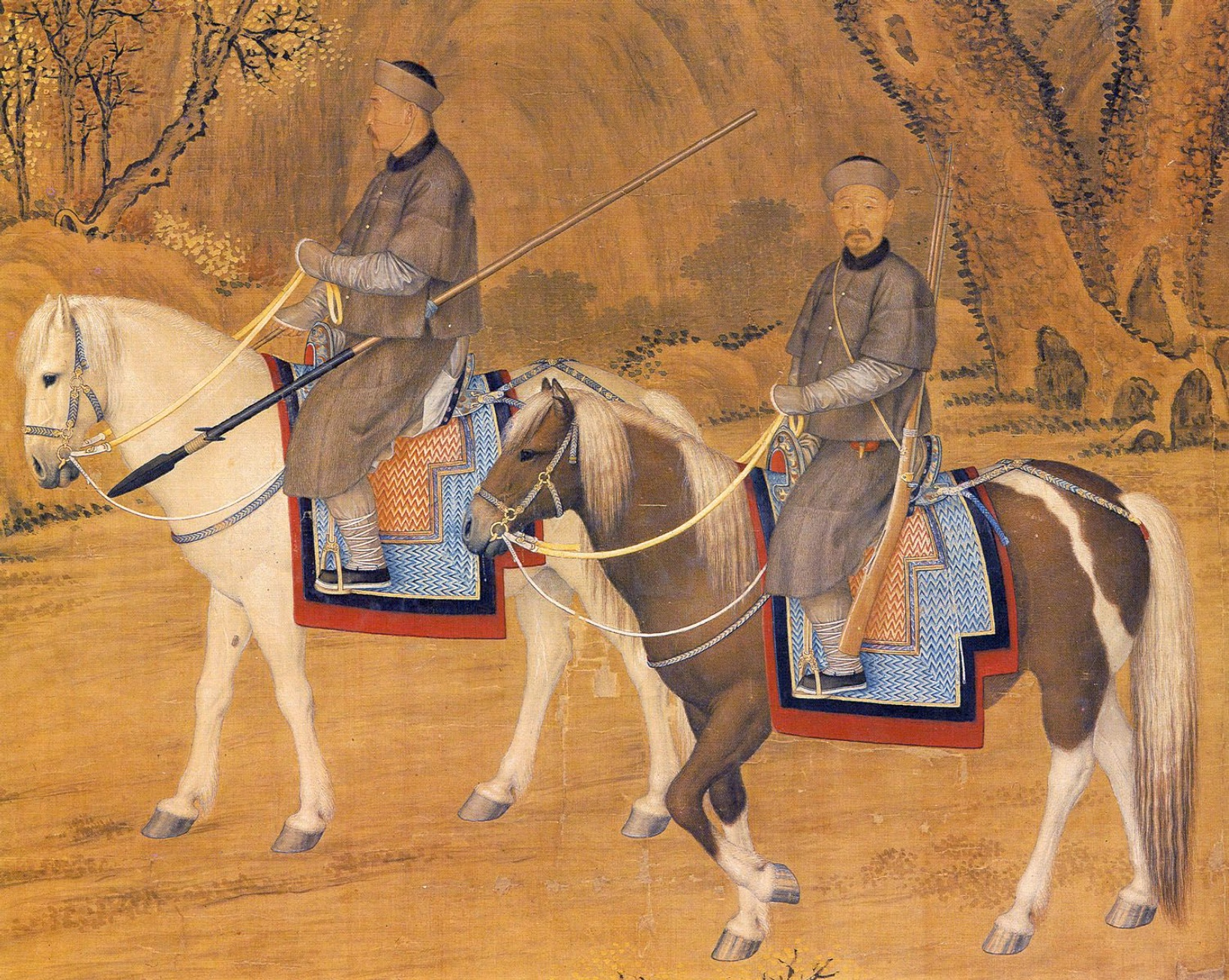
Detail from Portrait of the Emperor Troating for Deer, by Giuseppe Castiglione (1741)

The hunts at Mulan were commemorated in paintings produced by the imperial court, much like other military rituals of the Qing. This was especially true in the Qianlong era, in which commemorative art also portrayed the triannual grand inspections (dayue) of Eight Banners troops, and the dual rituals of dispatching armies (mingjiang) and welcoming their return (jiaolao). These works of art, as well as the activities depicted in them, all formed part of the Qianlong Emperor's propaganda campaign to promote martial values in Qing society.

Many of these paintings were done under the direction of Giuseppe Castiglione, the Jesuit missionary who served as one of Qianlong's court painters. A number of paintings produced during Qianlong's reign portray the emperor himself participating in the autumn hunt at Mulan, as well as in the other military rituals of the Qing. In particular, Castiglione produced a series of four scroll paintings about the Mulan hunt. He and his apprentices also produced a number of horse paintings, reviving a subject that had not been popular since the Tang dynasty. A Kazakh horse presented as a gift to the Qianlong Emperor serves as his mount in Castiglione's painting of the grand inspection of the troops, as well as in paintings of the emperor hunting. Copies of martially-themed paintings were disseminated widely in a variety of formats, conveying a message of military might both at home and abroad, as well as impressing a martial stamp upon domestic mass culture.

=== Diplomacy and ethnic policy ===
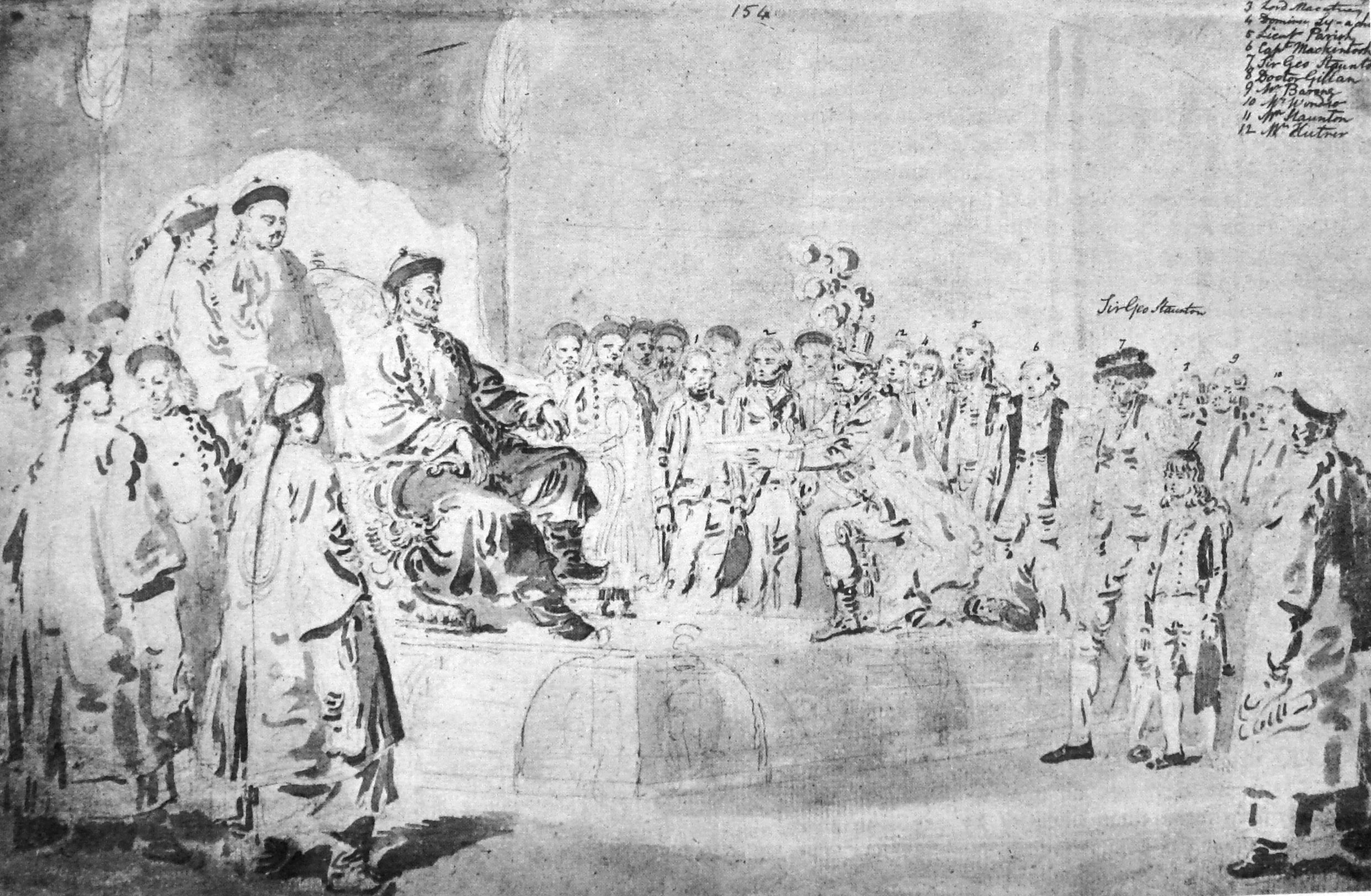
Lord Macartney's embassy to China, 1793

Mulan, and later Chengde, also played an important diplomatic role. It was at Chengde that Qianlong received the Macartney Embassy, cutting short his hunting trip to do so. As part of the Qing emperors' patronage of Tibetan Buddhism, several temples were built in the Tibetan style around Chengde, including the Puning Temple (1755, modeled after Samye Monastery), and the Putuo Zongcheng Temple (1771, modeled after the Potala Palace). It was also at Chengde that the Sixth Panchen Lama visited Qianlong in 1780, for which occasion the Xumi Fushou Temple was erected. At the hunting sites of Mulan, the Kangxi Emperor met with Khalkha, Kharchin, and Dörbet leaders. Likewise, Qianlong often pronounced edicts affecting Inner Asians at the hunting grounds.

The hunt itself, its proximity to the Yuan dynasty summer capital of the Mongols, the practice of living in tents or yurts, and the banquets held in honor of Mongol officials, all served to ingratiate the emperors of the Qing dynasty with their ethnic Mongol subjects and allies in particular, as well as Inner Asians generally. From the beginning of the Qing dynasty, Manchu emperors positioned themselves not only as the emperors of China, but were also referred to as Bogda Khan by Mongols. Originally the khan of the later Jin dynasty, Hong Taiji renamed his empire the Great Qing and declared himself its emperor in 1636 after receiving the surrender of the Chahar Mongols. The Qing sponsorship of Tibetan Buddhism was inherited from the Mongol tradition. The secondary capital and its hunting grounds, both outside the Great Wall, thus bolstered the Qing emperors' rhetoric of having brought the inner (Han Chinese) and outer (Mongol, Tibetan, Uyghur and so on) peoples together into one "family" (neiwai yijia).

=== As ritual ===
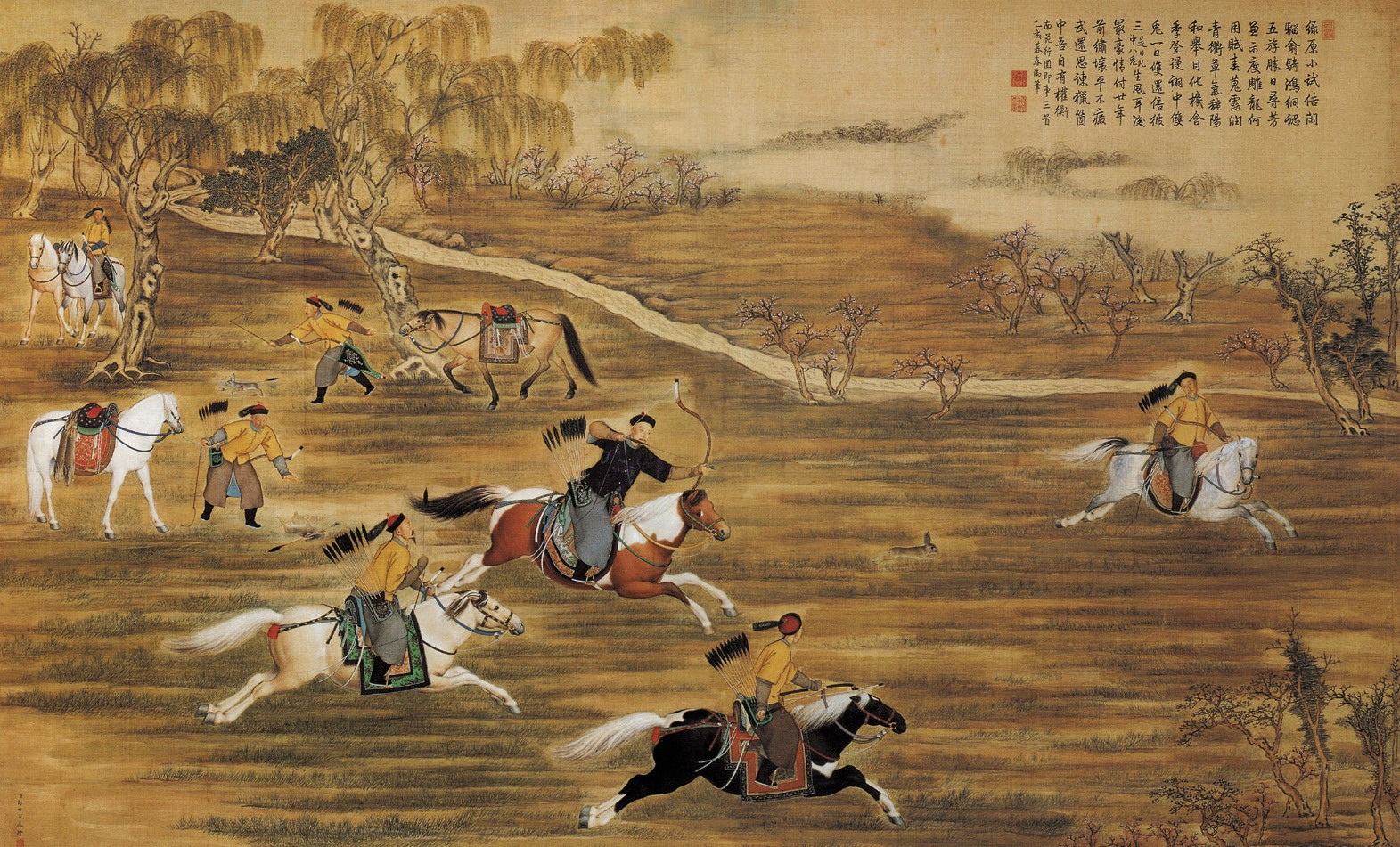
The Qianlong Emperor Hunting Hare by Giuseppe Castiglione (1755)

The Qing dynasty imperial hunts became increasingly elaborate and ritualized over time, particularly under the Qianlong Emperor. As hunting became uncommon among the Manchus, the majority of whom lived in the walled city of Beijing or the various Eight Banner garrisons throughout the empire, the imperial hunt at Mulan became one of the last contexts in which Manchu hunting skills could be practiced, and only by a select few. The institutionalization of the hunt led to its new role as a sort of performance, a stylized homage to past practices that were no longer living traditions for most Manchus. Hence, Elliott has referred to the Qing hunting tradition as an invented tradition, an "adaptation of an older practice for newer purposes". This adaptation emphasized what Qing emperors considered most important in Manchu culture as they saw it, namely their supposed embodiment of martial (wu) values, as opposed to the civil (wen) values that they attributed to the Chinese (see wen and wu). The Qianlong Emperor likened himself to Emperor Taizong of Tang, who represented a balance of wen and wu. Yet despite presenting themselves as the head of a family encompassing both Chinese and Inner Asian traditions, Qing emperors constantly worried about Manchu acculturation and the adoption of Chinese ways.

Part of the imperial hunt's new significance was its perceived value as a form of military training. A Qing dictionary defined the aba hunt as a way of "training for military proficiency". Theoretically, all Manchus were part of the hereditary warrior caste of the Eight Banners, a military organization which expanded rapidly to include Mongol and Han Chinese contingents during the Qing conquest of the Ming. Military skill, hunting, and Manchu ethnic identity were deeply intertwined. As John Bell wrote, Kangxi saw the hunt as a way to prevent the Manchus from acquiring the perceived Chinese traits of "idleness and effeminacy". Kangxi's fears had been shared by his grandfather, Hong Taiji, who believed that the Jin dynasty of his Jurchen ancestors had collapsed as a result of entering the "Chinese Way", to the neglect of their archery and riding skills. The Yongzheng and Qianlong Emperors frequently criticized slipping standards and laziness among the troops of the Eight Banners. Qianlong, unlike Kangxi, Hong Taiji, and Nurhaci, never led military campaigns in person. The annual hunt, as reinstated under Qianlong, thus represented the best remaining opportunity he had to personally direct his armies in their military training, as well as to regularly reaffirm old Manchu ways through codified ritual in the face of a rapidly shifting Manchu culture.

== See also ==
- Mulan Paddock
