= Saihanba National Forest Park =

Nature reserve in Hebei, China

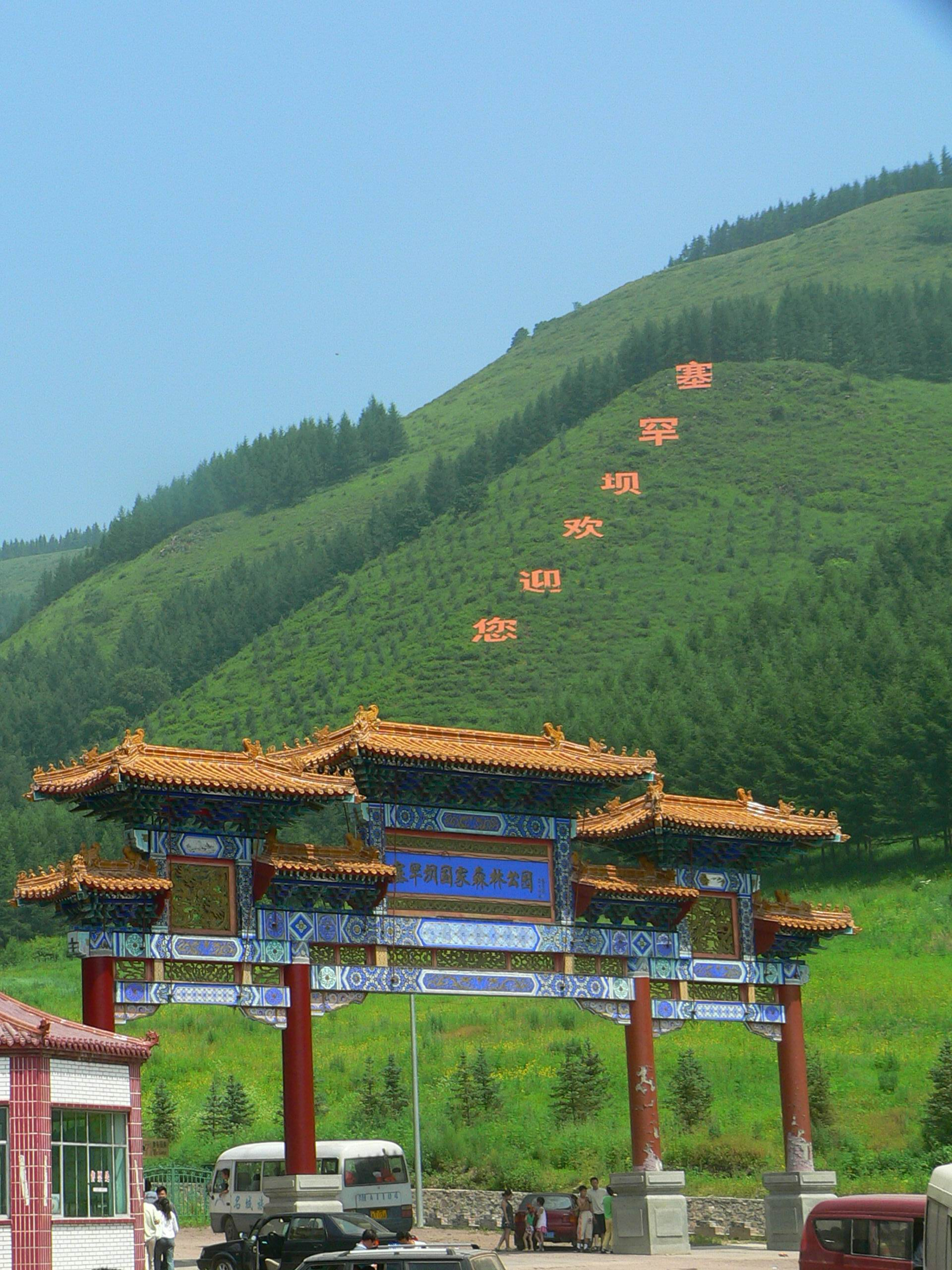
- Entrance of Saihanba National Forest Park.

- Location within Hebei
- Type: Public park, State park
- Location: Weichang Manchu and Mongol Autonomous County, Chengde, Hebei, China
- Coordinates: 42°28′54″N 117°16′28″E
- Area: 200.29-square-kilometre (77.33 sq mi)
- Created: 1962
- Operator: Hebei government
- Open: All year
- Website: www.saihanba.com.cn

Saihanba National Forest Park (simplified Chinese: 塞罕坝国家森林公园; traditional Chinese: 塞罕壩國家森林公園; pinyin: Sàihǎnbà Guójiā Sēnlín Gōngyuán) is a national forest park located in Weichang Manchu and Mongol Autonomous County, Chengde, Hebei, China, with Inner Mongolian Plateau standing in the northwest, covering an area of 200.29-square-kilometre (77.33 sq mi). Established in 1962, this is a multifunctional botanical park integrating scientific research, plant species collection and display as well as tourism. Saihanba is often called "the Green Lung of north China".

== History ==
In the Liao (907–1125) and Jin dynasties (1115–1234), Saihanba was a hunting-field for the imperial household.

In 1681, Kangxi Emperor (1654–1722) set the Mulan Paddock (simplified Chinese: 木兰围场; traditional Chinese: 木蘭圍場; Manchu: ᠮᡠᡵᠠᠨ ‍ᡳ ᡝᠠᠪᠠ, romanized: muran i aba) in the area.

In 1863, the Qing government allows farmers to reclaim land here, forests and wetlands were beginning to disappear. Saihanba became a barren desert. Then sandstorms plague Beijing, Tianjin and other northern China cities.

In 1962, in order to put an end to the sandstorms, the State Forestry Administration set the Saihanba Mechanical Forest Farm here. Then the first generation of tree-planters came here, they tried to green the barren desert and turn it into an oasis.

In May 1993, it was designated as a "National Forest Park".

In 2000, it has been categorized as a 5A level tourist site by the China National Tourism Administration.

In May 2007, the park was rated as a "National Nature Reserves" by the State Council of China.

On December 5, 2017, the Saihanba Afforestation Community won the honor of Champions of the Earth in the category of Inspiration and Action due to its efforts to transform degraded land into a lush paradise, the highest environmental honor provided by the United Nations Environment Programme.

== Geography ==
=== Climate ===
The Saihanba National Forest Park is in the cold temperate monsoon climate zone, with an average annual temperature of 1.3 °C (34.3 °F), the snow season in Saihanba lasts for about 7 months each year. The earliest recorded snowfall has been in August, and the latest in June.

== Natural history ==
There are more than 618 species and 312 genera vascular plants cultivated in the park, including Eleutherococcus gracilistylus, Astragalus propinquus, Glycine, and Agropyron.

Within the boundaries of the park, the following number of species are known to live: 261 species of mammals, 39 species of birds, 32 species of fish, and about 660 species of insects.

== Attractions ==
- Qixing Lake (七星湖)
- Taifeng Lake (泰丰湖)
- Saihan Tower (赛罕塔)
- Headwater of Luan River (滦河源头)
- Moon Lake (月亮湖)
- Yudaokou Grassland and Forest Scenic Spot (御道口草原森林风景区)
- Hongsongwa National Nature Reserves (红松洼国家级自然保护区)

== Transportation ==
- Siheyong railway station (四合永站)

== Gallery ==
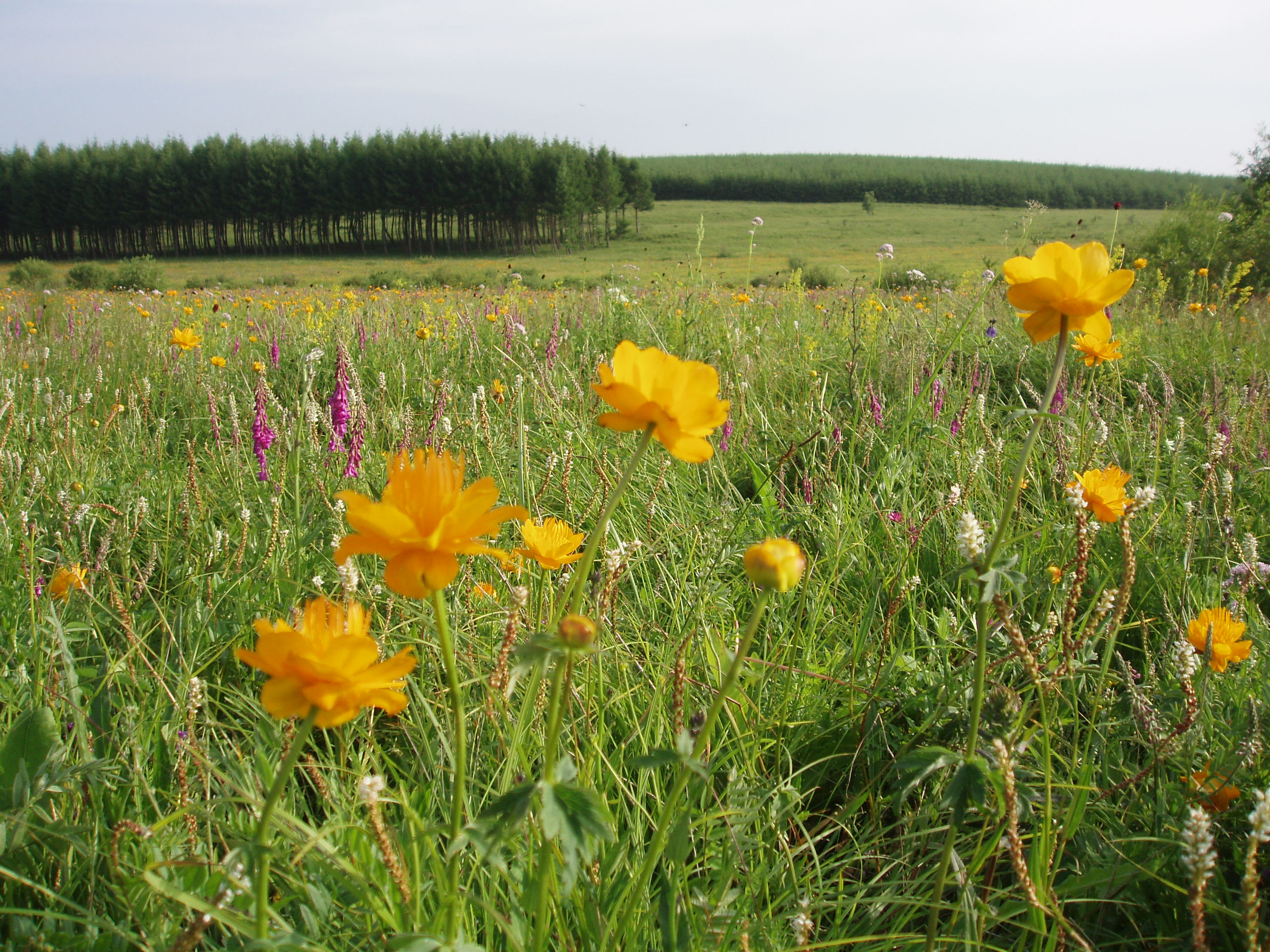
Grassland in Saihanba.

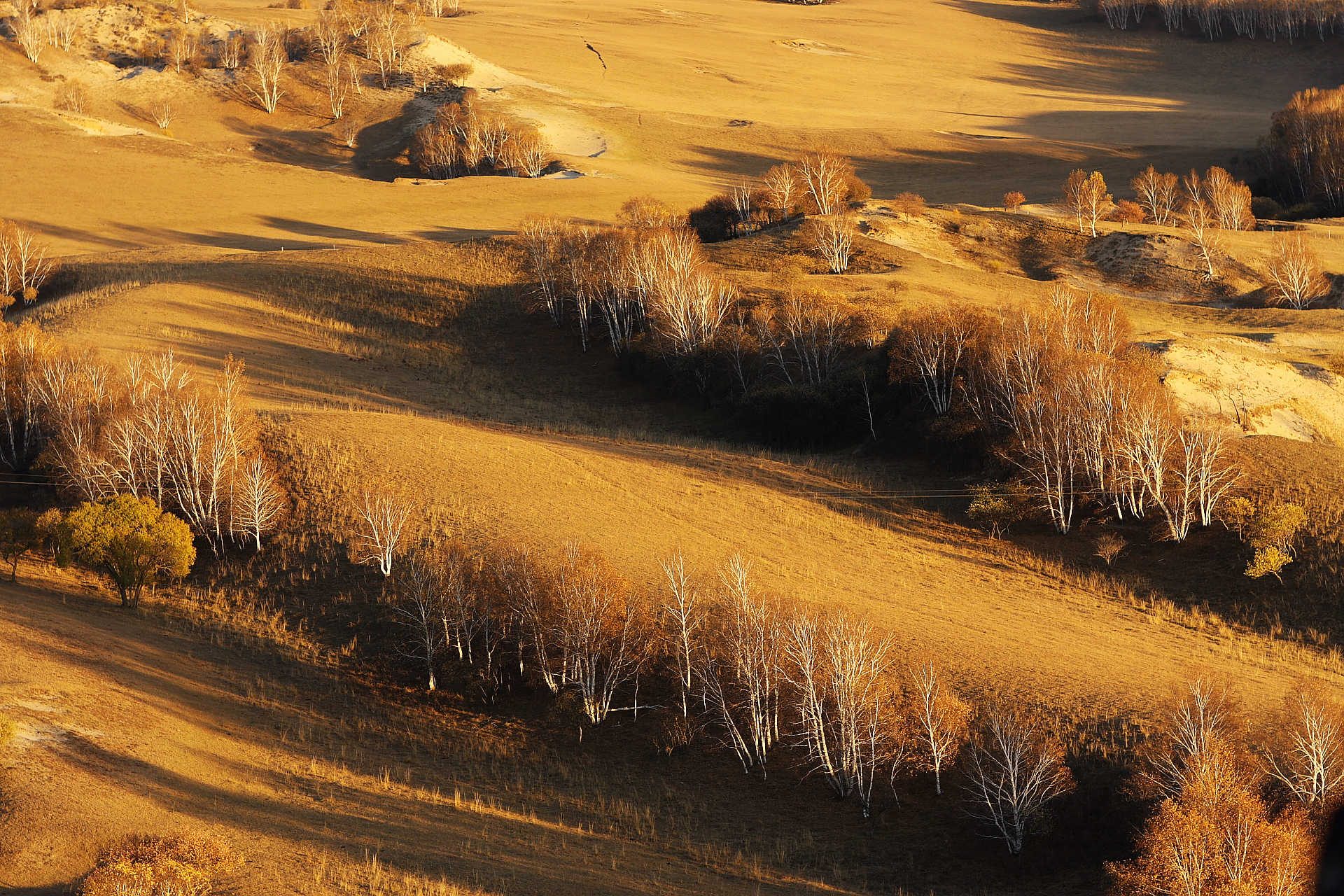
Mulan Paddock.

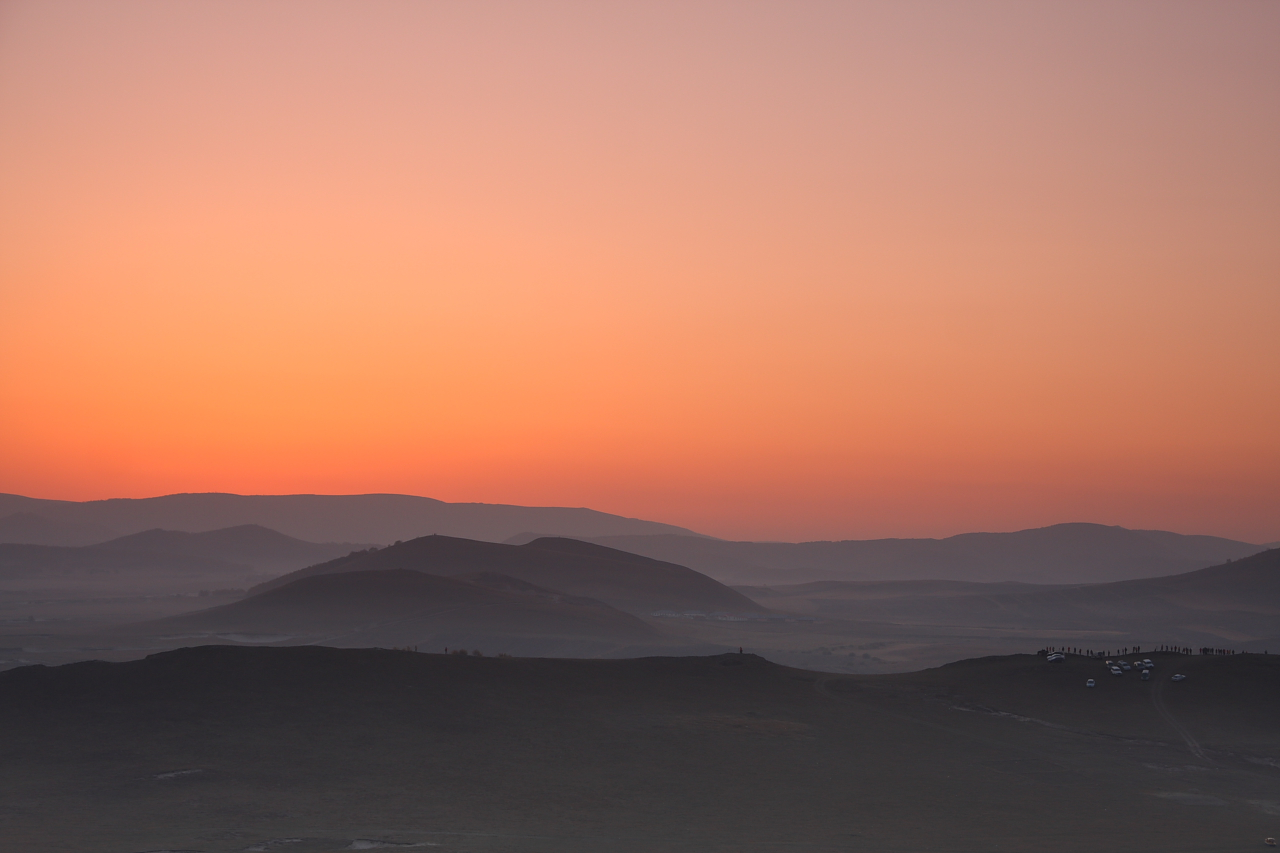
Sunset scenery in Mulan Paddock.

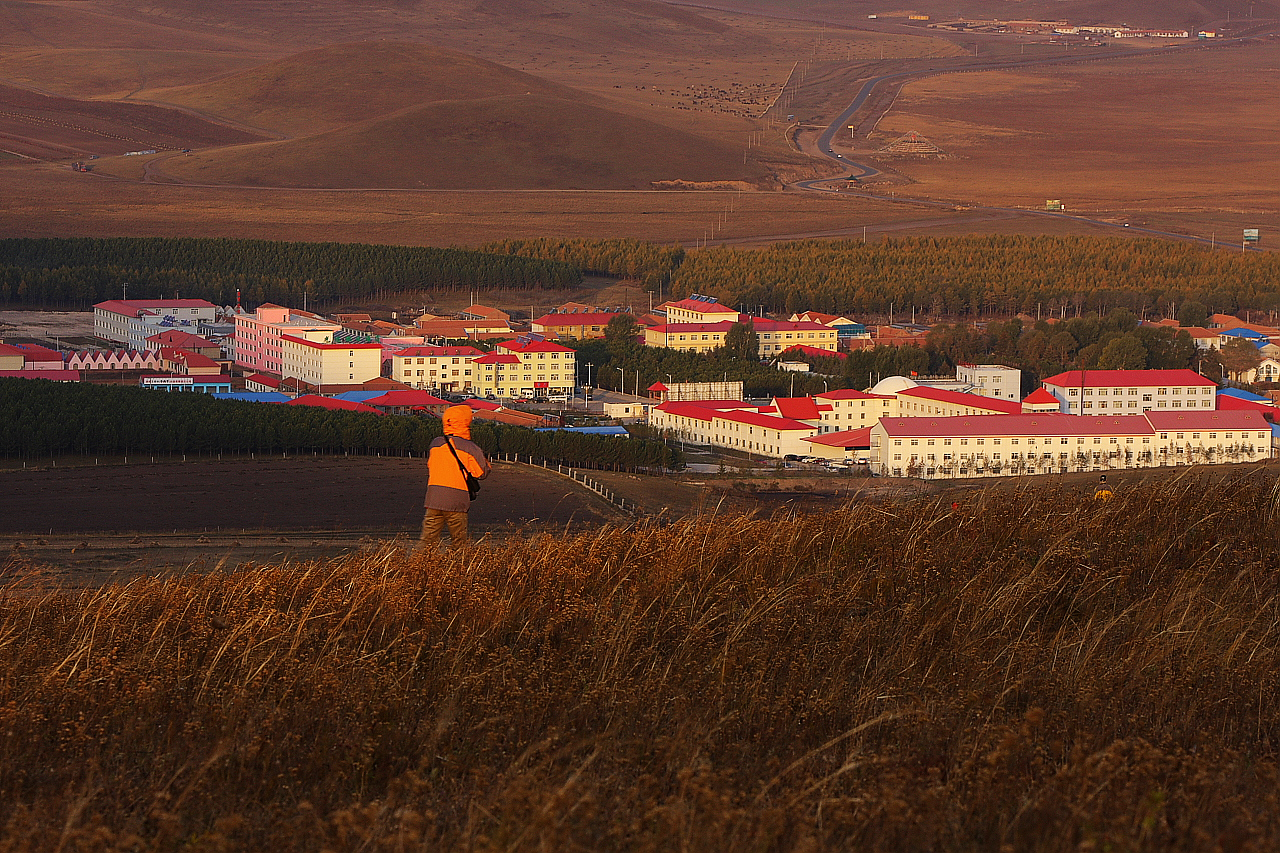
Residential area in Saihanba.

== See also ==
- List of protected areas of China
