= Wu Dan =

Wu Dan may refer to:

- Emperor Ruizong of Tang (662–716), used the personal name Wu Dan (武旦) from 698 to 705
- Wu Dan (volleyball) (巫丹) (born 1968), Chinese volleyball player
- Wudan (武旦), a type of female role in Chinese opera specialized in fighting with all kinds of weapons

== See also ==
- Wudan, Inner Mongolia (乌丹), a town in Ongniud Banner, Inner Mongolia, China
- Wudang (disambiguation)
- Wu-Tang (disambiguation)
