= Dahuanqi Township =

Dahuanqi Township 大唤起乡
- Rural Township
- Dàhuànqĭ Xiāng
- Location in Hebei Location in China
- Coordinates: 42°03′25″N 117°33′12″E
- Country: People's Republic of China
- Province: Hebei
- Prefecture-level city: Chengde
- Autonomous county: Weichang

Area
  - Total: 245.2 km^{2} (94.7 sq mi)

Population (2010)
  - Total: 7,131
  - Density: 29.08/km^{2} (75.3/sq mi)
- Time zone: UTC+8 (China Standard)

Dahuanqi Township (Chinese: 大唤起乡; pinyin: Dàhuànqĭ Xiāng) is a rural township located in Weichang Manchu and Mongol Autonomous County, Chengde, Hebei, China. According to the 2010 census, Dahuanqi Township had a population of 7,131, including 3,594 males and 3,537 females. The population was distributed as follows: 1,546 people aged under 14, 5,041 people aged between 15 and 64, and 544 people aged over 65.

== See also ==
- List of township-level divisions of Hebei
