= Chaoyangdi =

Chaoyangdi 朝阳地 • ᠴᠣᠣ ᠶᠠᠩ ᡩᡳ (Chinese) • (Manchu & Mongolian)
- Town
- Location in Hebei Location in China
- Coordinates: 42°01′20″N 118°13′04″E
- Country: People's Republic of China
- Province: Hebei
- Prefecture-level city: Chengde
- Autonomous county: Weichang

Area
  - Total: 166.1 km^{2} (64.1 sq mi)

Population (2010)
  - Total: 13,773
  - Density: 82.93/km^{2} (214.8/sq mi)
- Time zone: UTC+8 (China Standard)

Chaoyangdi (Chinese: 朝阳地镇; pinyin: Cháoyángdì Zhèn) (Manchu: ᠴᠣᠣ
ᠶᠠᠩ
ᡩᡳ
ᡴᠠᡩᠠᠯᠠᠩᡤᠠ; Möllendorff romanization: Coo yang di Kadalaŋga) (Mongolian: ᠴᠣᠣ
ᠶᠠᠩ
ᡩᡳ
ᠪᠠᠯᠭᠠᠰᠤ; Mongolian cyrillization: Цуу ян ди балгас; ; Mongolian romanization: Coo yang di Balɣasu) is a town located in Weichang Manchu and Mongol Autonomous County, Chengde, Hebei, China. According to the 2010 census, Chaoyangdi had a population of 13,773, including 7,039 males and 6,734 females. The population was distributed as follows: 2,896 people aged under 14, 9,663 people aged between 15 and 64, and 1,214 people aged over 65.

== See also ==
- List of township-level divisions of Hebei
