= Baoyuanzhan Township =

Baoyuanzhan Township 宝元栈乡
- Rural Township
- Bǎoyuánzhàn Xiāng
- Location in Hebei Location in China
- Coordinates: 42°20′01″N 117°37′45″E
- Country: People's Republic of China
- Province: Hebei
- Prefecture-level city: Chengde
- Autonomous county: Weichang

Area
  - Total: 288.7 km^{2} (111.5 sq mi)

Population (2010)
  - Total: 7,338
  - Density: 25.42/km^{2} (65.8/sq mi)
- Time zone: UTC+8 (China Standard)

Baoyuanzhan Township (Chinese: 宝元栈乡; pinyin: Bǎoyuánzhàn Xiāng) is a rural township located in Weichang Manchu and Mongol Autonomous County, Chengde, Hebei, China. According to the 2010 census, Baoyuanzhan Township had a population of 7,338, including 3,716 males and 3,622 females. The population was distributed as follows: 1,500 people aged under 14, 5,262 people aged between 15 and 64, and 576 people aged over 65.

== See also ==
- List of township-level divisions of Hebei
