= Wudang =

Wudang (Wade–Giles: Wu-tang) may refer to:

== Places ==
- Wudang District, Guiyang, Guizhou
- Wudang Mountains, a mountain range and World Heritage Site in Hubei, China.
- North Wudang, a Taoist mountain and temple complex in Shanxi
- Wudang Town, Jiangxi (武当镇), a town in Longnan County

== Martial arts ==
- Wudang quan, a class of Chinese martial arts from the Wudang Mountains
- Wudang Sect, Wudang Clan, or Wu-Tang Clan, a fictional martial arts sect
- Wu Dang (film), a 2012 Chinese martial arts film

== See also ==
- Wu-Tang (disambiguation)
- Wu Dan (disambiguation)
