= Wu-Tang (disambiguation) =

Wu-Tang Clan is an American hip-hop group.

Wu-Tang may also refer to:

- Wu-Tang: Shaolin Style, a 1999 video game
- Wu-tang (dance), a form of hip-hop dance
- Wu Tang (Qing dynasty) (吳棠), a Viceroy of Min-Zhe from 1866 to 1867
- Wudangquan, also romanized Wutangchʻüan, a style of Chinese martial arts
- Wudang School, sometimes also referred to as the Wu-tang School or Wu-Tang Clan, a fictional martial arts school mentioned in several works of wuxia fiction
- "Wu-Tang", a song by They Might Be Giants from The World Is to Dig

== See also ==
- Wudang (disambiguation), spelled Wutang or Wu-tang in Wade–Giles
- Wu Dan (disambiguation)
- Tang Wu (fl. 1940s–1960s), an ambassador of China to Egypt and other countries
