= Daobazi Township =

Daobazi Township 道坝子乡
- Rural Township
- Dàobàzi Xiāng
- Location in Hebei Location in China
- Coordinates: 41°58′17″N 117°33′05″E
- Country: People's Republic of China
- Province: Hebei
- Prefecture-level city: Chengde
- Autonomous county: Weichang

Area
  - Total: 191.8 km^{2} (74.1 sq mi)

Population (2010)
  - Total: 7,448
  - Density: 38.84/km^{2} (100.6/sq mi)
- Time zone: UTC+8 (China Standard)

Daobazi Township (Chinese: 道坝子乡; pinyin: Dàobàzi Xiāng) is a rural township located in Weichang Manchu and Mongol Autonomous County, Chengde, Hebei, China. According to the 2010 census, Daobazi Township had a population of 7,448. This included 3,699 males and 3,749 females. The population was distributed as follows: 1,507 people aged under 14, 5,289 people aged between 15 and 64, and 652 people aged over 65.

== See also ==
- List of township-level divisions of Hebei
