= Datoushan Township =

Datoushan Township 大头山乡
- Rural Township
- Dàtóushān Xiāng
- Location in Hebei Location in China
- Coordinates: 41°53′22″N 117°13′44″E
- Country: People's Republic of China
- Province: Hebei
- Prefecture-level city: Chengde
- Autonomous county: Weichang

Area
  - Total: 184.0 km^{2} (71.0 sq mi)

Population (2010)
  - Total: 8,060
  - Density: 43.81/km^{2} (113.5/sq mi)
- Time zone: UTC+8 (China Standard)

Datoushan Township (Chinese: 大头山乡; pinyin: Dàtóushān Xiāng) is a rural township located in Weichang Manchu and Mongol Autonomous County, Chengde, Hebei, China. According to the 2010 census, Datoushan Township had a population of 8,060, including 4,031 males and 4,029 females. The population was distributed as follows: 1,643 people aged under 14, 5,553 people aged between 15 and 64, and 864 people aged over 65.

== See also ==
- List of township-level divisions of Hebei
