= Ongniud Banner =

Ongniud Banner 翁牛特旗 • ᠣᠩᠨᠢᠭᠤᠳ ᠬᠣᠰᠢᠭᠤ
- banner
- Location in Inner Mongolia
- Coordinates: 42°56′N 119°02′E
- Country: China
- Autonomous region: Inner Mongolia
- Prefecture-level city: Chifeng
- Banner seat: Wudan

Area
  - Total: 11,870 km^{2} (4,580 sq mi)

Population (2020)
  - Total: 333,970
  - Density: 28.14/km^{2} (72.87/sq mi)
- Time zone: UTC+8 (China Standard)
- Postal code: 024500
- Website: www.wnt.gov.cn

Ongniud Banner

Chinese name
- Chinese: 翁牛特旗
Transcriptions
Standard Mandarin
- Hanyu Pinyin: Wēngniútè Qí

Mongolian name
- Mongolian Cyrillic: Онниуд хошуу
- Mongolian script: ᠣᠩᠨᠢᠭᠤᠳ ᠬᠣᠰᠢᠭᠤ
Transcriptions
- SASM/GNC: Oŋniɣud qosiɣu

Ongniud Banner (Mongolian: ᠣᠩᠨᠢᠭᠤᠳ ᠬᠣᠰᠢᠭᠤ; Chinese: 翁牛特旗) is a banner of eastern Inner Mongolia, China. It is under the administration of Chifeng City, 76 kilometres (47 mi) to the south-southwest. Yulong Shahu Scenic Area is located about 25 km north of Ongniud town. The south of Ongniud Banner is arable land with grassy hills. The north east half is predominantly grassland and desert.

== Demographics ==
The proportion of nationalities in Ongniud Banner (2020)
Nationality	Percentage
Han	82.3%
Mongols	16.7%
Manchus	0.9%
Hui people	0.1%
Others	0.0%
Source of the population statistics :

== Administrative divisions ==
Ongniud Banner is made up of 2 subdistricts, 8 towns, 2 townships, and 4 sums.

Name	Simplified Chinese	Hanyu Pinyin	Mongolian (Hudum Script)	Mongolian (Cyrillic)	Administrative division code
Subdistricts
Zicheng Subdistrict (Borhot Subdistrict)	紫城街道	Zǐchéng Jiēdào	ᠪᠣᠷᠣᠬᠣᠲᠠ ᠵᠡᠭᠡᠯᠢ ᠭᠤᠳᠤᠮᠵᠢ	Борхот зээл гудамж	150426402
Quanning Subdistrict	全宁街道	Quánníng Jiēdào	ᠴᠢᠤᠸᠠᠨ ᠨᠢᠩ ᠵᠡᠭᠡᠯᠢ ᠭᠤᠳᠤᠮᠵᠢ	Чиован нин зээл гудамж	150426403
Towns
Wudan Town (Borhot Town)	乌丹镇	Wūdān Zhèn	ᠪᠣᠷᠣᠬᠣᠲᠠ ᠪᠠᠯᠭᠠᠰᠤ	Борхот балгас	150426100
Udan Tohoi Town	乌敦套海镇	Wūdūntàohǎi Zhèn	ᠤᠳᠠᠨ ᠲᠣᠬᠠᠢ ᠪᠠᠯᠭᠠᠰᠤ	Удан тухай балгас	150426101
Wufendi Town	五分地镇	Wǔfēndì Zhèn	ᠡᠦ ᠹᠧᠨ ᠳ᠋ᠢ ᠪᠠᠯᠭᠠᠰᠤ	Үү фен ди балгас	150426102
Qiaotou Town	桥头镇	Qiáotóu Zhèn	ᠴᠢᠶᠣᠤ ᠲᠧᠦ ᠪᠠᠯᠭᠠᠰᠤ	Чяо дүү балгас	150426103
Guangdegong Town	广德公镇	Guǎngdégōng Zhèn	ᠭᠤᠸᠠᠩ ᠳ᠋ᠧ ᠭᠦᠩ ᠪᠠᠯᠭᠠᠰᠤ	Гуан те хүн балгас	150426104
Wutonghua Town (Udiin Hua Town)	梧桐花镇	Wútónghuā Zhèn	ᠦᠳᠡ ᠶᠢᠨ ᠬᠤᠸᠠ ᠪᠠᠯᠭᠠᠰᠤ	Үдийн ухаа балгас	150426105
Hails Town	海拉苏镇	Hǎilāsū Zhèn	ᠬᠠᠢᠯᠠᠰᠤ ᠪᠠᠯᠭᠠᠰᠤ	Хайлаас балгас	150426106
Yihegong Town	亿合公镇	Yìhégōng Zhèn	ᠢ ᠾᠧ ᠭᠦᠩ ᠪᠠᠯᠭᠠᠰᠤ	И хе гүн балгас	150426107
Townships
Jiefangyingzi Township	解放营子乡	Jiěfàngyíngzi Xiāng	ᠵᠢᠶᠧ ᠹᠠᠩ ᠶᠢᠩᠽᠢ ᠰᠢᠶᠠᠩ	Жье фан енз шиян	150426200
Maoshandong Township (Muu Xangd Township)	毛山东乡	Máoshāndōng Xiāng	ᠮᠠᠭᠤ ᠱᠠᠩᠳᠠ ᠰᠢᠶᠠᠩ	Муу шанд шиян	150426204
Sums
Axihan Sum	阿什罕苏木	Āshíhǎn Sūmù	ᠠᠰᠢᠬᠠᠨ ᠰᠤᠮᠤ	Ашхан сум	150426201
Xin Som Sum	新苏莫苏木	Xīnsūmò Sūmù	ᠰᠢᠨᠡᠰᠦ᠋ᠮ᠎ᠡ ᠰᠤᠮᠤ	Шинэсэм сум	150426202
Bayan Tohoi Sum	白音套海苏木	Báiyīntàohǎi Sūmù	ᠪᠠᠶᠠᠨᠲᠣᠬᠣᠢ ᠰᠤᠮᠤ	Баянтохой сум	150426203
Herseng Sum	格日僧苏木	Gérìsēng Sūmù	ᠬᠡᠷᠰᠡᠩ ᠰᠤᠮᠤ	Хэрсэн сум	150426205

- Other: Yulong Industrial Park (玉龙工业园区)

== Climate ==
Climate data for Ongniud Banner, elevation 634 m (2,080 ft), (1991–2020 normals, extremes 1981–present)
Month	Jan	Feb	Mar	Apr	May	Jun	Jul	Aug	Sep	Oct	Nov	Dec	Year
Record high °C (°F)	10.2 (50.4)	19.1 (66.4)	26.9 (80.4)	33.0 (91.4)	36.9 (98.4)	39.0 (102.2)	40.5 (104.9)	38.1 (100.6)	34.7 (94.5)	29.2 (84.6)	21.1 (70.0)	15.8 (60.4)	40.5 (104.9)
Mean daily maximum °C (°F)	−5.0 (23.0)	−0.6 (30.9)	6.5 (43.7)	15.9 (60.6)	23.0 (73.4)	26.9 (80.4)	28.9 (84.0)	27.4 (81.3)	22.8 (73.0)	14.8 (58.6)	4.0 (39.2)	−3.5 (25.7)	13.4 (56.2)
Daily mean °C (°F)	−11.6 (11.1)	−7.7 (18.1)	−0.4 (31.3)	9.1 (48.4)	16.5 (61.7)	21.0 (69.8)	23.3 (73.9)	21.4 (70.5)	15.6 (60.1)	7.6 (45.7)	−2.5 (27.5)	−9.8 (14.4)	6.9 (44.4)
Mean daily minimum °C (°F)	−17.1 (1.2)	−13.8 (7.2)	−6.8 (19.8)	2.2 (36.0)	9.6 (49.3)	14.7 (58.5)	17.7 (63.9)	15.6 (60.1)	9.0 (48.2)	1.3 (34.3)	−7.9 (17.8)	−15.0 (5.0)	0.8 (33.4)
Record low °C (°F)	−28.8 (−19.8)	−25.8 (−14.4)	−24.5 (−12.1)	−10.2 (13.6)	−1.3 (29.7)	3.5 (38.3)	8.7 (47.7)	4.5 (40.1)	−1.5 (29.3)	−10.9 (12.4)	−22.1 (−7.8)	−26.9 (−16.4)	−28.8 (−19.8)
Average precipitation mm (inches)	1.3 (0.05)	2.0 (0.08)	6.7 (0.26)	15.8 (0.62)	34.9 (1.37)	67.5 (2.66)	102.2 (4.02)	62.4 (2.46)	30.7 (1.21)	13.9 (0.55)	6.6 (0.26)	1.4 (0.06)	345.4 (13.6)
Average precipitation days (≥ 0.1 mm)	1.8	1.7	3.3	4.3	7.8	11.7	12.5	10.0	6.5	4.5	2.8	1.6	68.5
Average snowy days	2.8	2.8	4.4	2.2	0.1	0	0	0	0	1.6	3.6	3.0	20.5
Average relative humidity (%)	44	39	36	34	38	53	65	66	56	46	46	46	47
Mean monthly sunshine hours	221.2	228.6	273.9	274.1	293.7	269.9	275.3	277.7	266.6	252.1	206.8	203.5	3,043.4
Percentage possible sunshine	76	76	74	68	65	59	60	65	72	75	72	73	70
Source: China Meteorological Administration all-time Jan low
