= Chaoyangwan =

Chaoyangwan 朝阳湾 • ᠴᠣᠣ ᠶᠠᠩ ᠸᠠᠨ (Chinese) • (Manchu & Mongolian)
- Town
- Cháoyángwān Zhèn
- Location in Hebei Location in China
- Coordinates: 42°03′05″N 117°56′50″E
- Country: People's Republic of China
- Province: Hebei
- Prefecture-level city: Chengde
- Autonomous county: Weichang

Area
  - Total: 183.9 km^{2} (71.0 sq mi)

Population (2010)
  - Total: 15,155
  - Density: 82.43/km^{2} (213.5/sq mi)
- Time zone: UTC+8 (China Standard)

Chaoyangwan (Chinese: 朝阳湾镇; pinyin: Cháoyángwān Zhèn) (Manchu: ᠴᠣᠣ
ᠶᠠᠩ
ᠸᠠᠨ
ᡴᠠᡩᠠᠯᠠᠩᡤᠠ; Möllendorff romanization: Coo yang wan Kadalaŋga) (Mongolian: ᠴᠣᠣ
ᠶᠠᠩ
ᠸᠠᠨ
ᠪᠠᠯᠭᠠᠰᠤ; Mongolian cyrillization: Цуу ян ван балгас; ; Mongolian romanization: Coo yang wan Balɣasu) is a town located in Weichang Manchu and Mongol Autonomous County, Chengde, Hebei, China. According to the 2010 census, Chaoyangwan had a population of 15,155, including 7,593 males and 7,562 females. The population was distributed as follows: 3,300 people aged under 14, 10,575 people aged between 15 and 64, and 1,280 people aged over 65.

== See also ==
- List of township-level divisions of Hebei
