= Banjieta =

Banjieta 半截塔 • ᠪᠠᠨ ᠵᡳᠶᡝ ᡨᠠ • ᠪᠠᠨ ᠵᠢᠶᠧ ᠲᠠ (Chinese) • (Manchu) • (Mongolian)
- Town
- Mandarin Pinyin: Bànjiétǎ Mongolian Pinyin: Ban ǰiyē ta Mongolian Cyrillic: Ба жье да Möllendorff: Ban jiye ta
- Location in Hebei Location in China
- Coordinates: 41°55′04″N 117°27′39″E
- Country: People's Republic of China
- Province: Hebei
- Prefecture-level city: Chengde
- Autonomous county: Weichang

Area
  - Total: 211.0 km^{2} (81.5 sq mi)

Population (2010)
  - Total: 9,542
  - Density: 45.22/km^{2} (117.1/sq mi)
- Time zone: UTC+8 (China Standard)

Banjieta (Chinese: 半截塔镇; pinyin: Bànjiétǎ Zhèn) is a town located in Weichang Manchu and Mongol Autonomous County, Chengde, Hebei, China. According to the 2010 census, Banjieta had a population of 9,542, including 4,897 males and 4,645 females. The population was distributed as follows: 1,948 people aged under 14, 6,763 people aged between 15 and 64, and 831 people aged over 65.

== See also ==
- List of township-level divisions of Hebei
