= Wudan, Inner Mongolia =

Wudan 乌丹镇 ᠪᠣᠷᠣᠬᠣᠲᠠ ᠪᠠᠯᠭᠠᠰᠤ
- Town
- Location in Inner Mongolia
- Coordinates: 42°55′42″N 119°01′26″E
- Country: People's Republic of China
- Autonomous region: Inner Mongolia
- Prefecture-level city: Chifeng
- Banner: Ongniud Banner
- Time zone: UTC+8 (China Standard)

Wudan (simplified Chinese: 乌丹; traditional Chinese: 烏丹; pinyin: Wūdān) Borhot (Mongolian: ᠪᠣᠷᠣᠬᠣᠲᠠ ; Борхот) is a town in Ongniud Banner, Inner Mongolia, China. As of 2018, it had 27 villages under its administration, including 16 gaqaa.
