= Weichang Manchu and Mongol Autonomous County =

Weichang County 围场县 • ᠸᡝᡳ ᠴᠠᠩ ᡥᡳᠶᠠᠨ • ᠸᠧᠢ ᠴᠠᠩ ᠰᠢᠶᠠᠨ (Chinese) • (Manchu) • (Mongolian)
- Autonomous county
- 围场满族蒙古族自治县 • ᠸᡝᡳ ᠴᠠᠩ ᠮᠠᠨᠵᡠ ᠮᠣᠩᡤᠣ ᠮᡠᡴᡡᠨ ᠪᡝᠶᡝ ᡩᠠᠰᠠᡵᠠ ᡥᡳᠶᠠᠨ ᠸᠧᠢ ᠴᠠᠩ ᠮᠠᠨᠵᠤ ᠮᠣᠩᠭᠣᠯ ᠦᠨᠳᠦᠰᠦᠲᠡᠨ ᠤ ᠥᠪᠡᠷᠲᠡᠭᠡᠨ ᠵᠠᠰᠠᠬᠤ ᠰᠢᠶᠠᠨ; Weichang Manchu and Mongol; Autonomous County
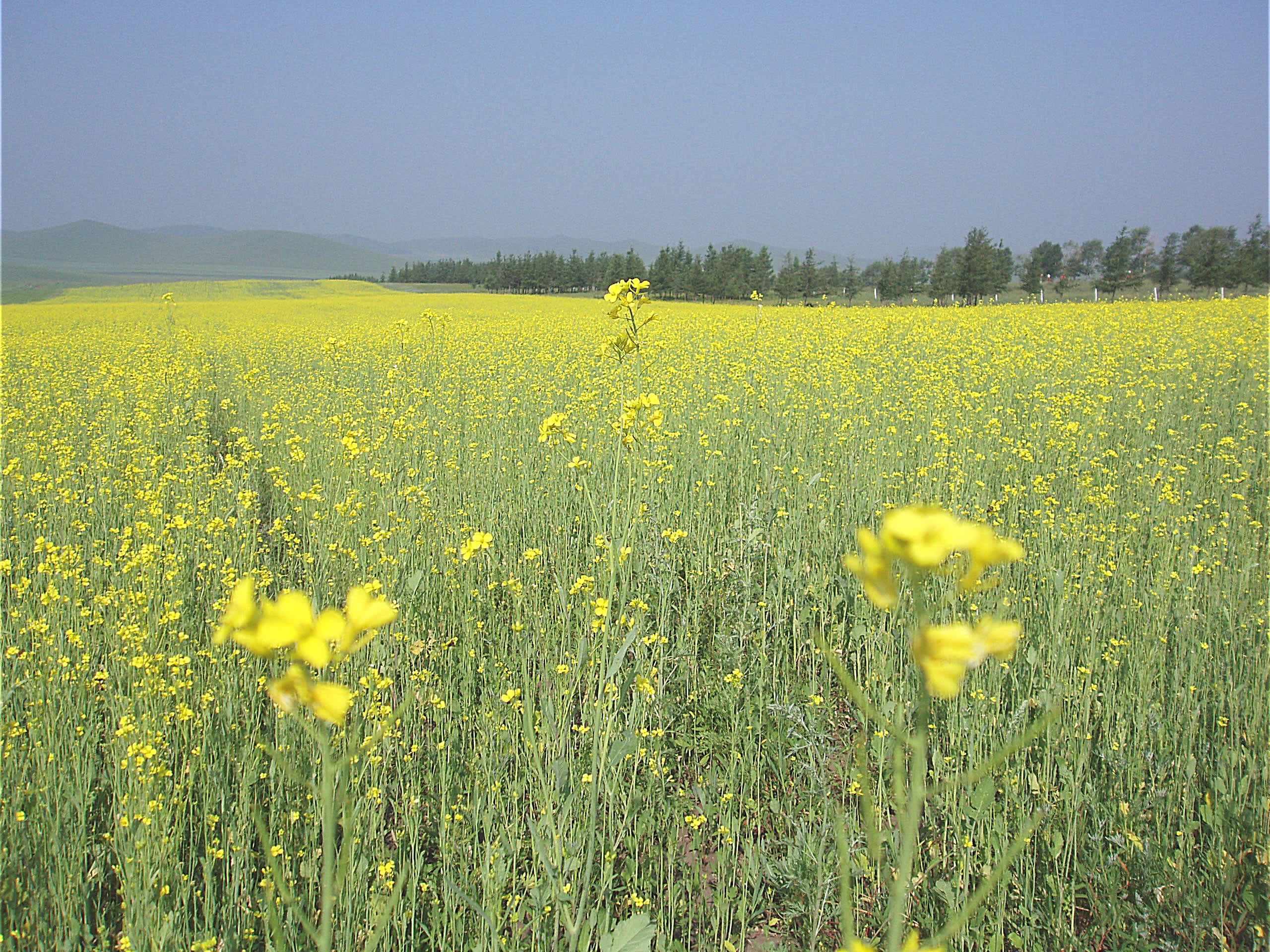
- Saihanba National Park within the county

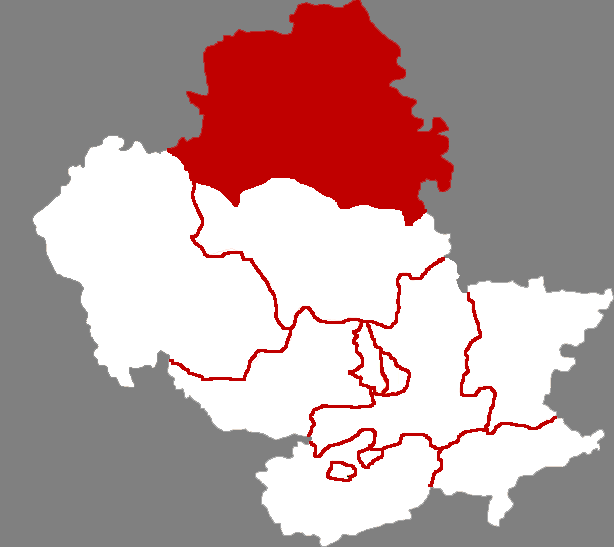
- Weichang in Chengde

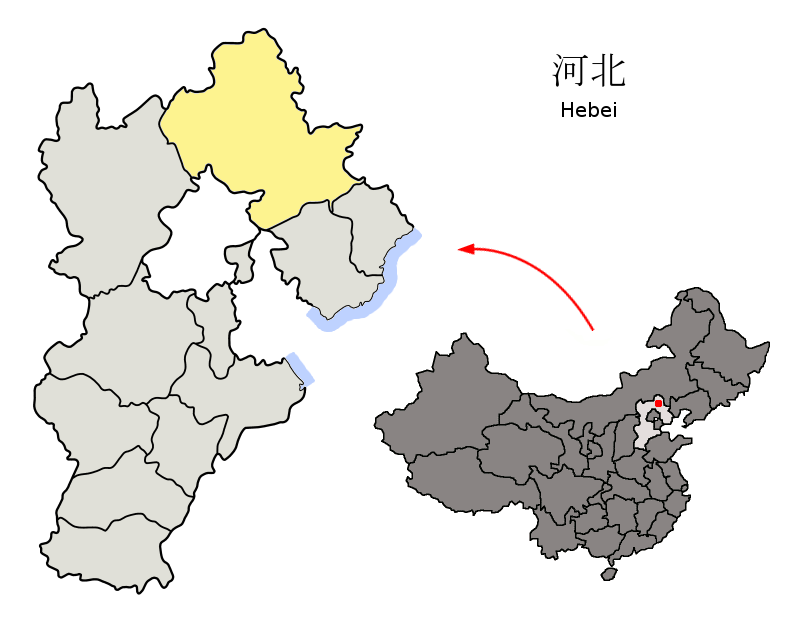
- Chengde in Hebei

- Location of the seat in Hebei
- Coordinates: 41°56′20″N 117°45′36″E
- Country: China
- Province: Hebei
- Prefecture-level city: Chengde
- County seat: Weichang Town

Area
  - Total: 9,058 km^{2} (3,497 sq mi)
- Elevation: 847 m (2,779 ft)

Population (2020 census)
  - Total: 423,676
  - Density: 46.77/km^{2} (121.1/sq mi)
- Time zone: UTC+8 (China Standard)
- Postal code: 068400
- Area code: 0314
- Website: www.weichang.gov.cn

Weichang Manchu and Mongol Autonomous County

Chinese name
- Simplified Chinese: 围场满族蒙古族自治县
- Traditional Chinese: 圍場滿族蒙古族自治縣
Transcriptions
Standard Mandarin
- Hanyu Pinyin: Wéichǎng Mǎnzú Ménggǔzú Zìzhìxiàn

Mongolian name
- Mongolian Cyrillic: Вей цан манж монгол үндэстэний өөртөө засах шиан
- Mongolian script: ᠸᠧᠢ ᠴᠠᠩ ᠮᠠᠨᠵᠤ ᠮᠣᠩᠭᠣᠯ ᠦᠨᠳᠦᠰᠦᠲᠡᠨ ᠤ ᠥᠪᠡᠷᠲᠡᠭᠡᠨ ᠵᠠᠰᠠᠬᠤ ᠰᠢᠶᠠᠨ
Transcriptions
- SASM/GNC: wēi čaŋ manǰu moŋɣol ündüsüten-u öbertegen jasaꭓu siyan

Manchu name
- Manchu script: ᠸᡝᡳ ᠴᠠᠩ ᠮᠠᠨᠵᡠ ᠮᠣᠩᡤᠣ ᠮᡠᡴᡡᠨ ᠪᡝᠶᡝ ᡩᠠᠰᠠᡵᠠ ᡥᡳᠶᠠᠨ
- Möllendorff: wei cang manju monggo mukūn beye dasangga siyan

Weichang Manchu and Mongol Autonomous County (Chinese: 围场满族蒙古族自治县) is a Manchu and Mongol autonomous county located in far northeastern Hebei province, China. It lies under the administration of Chengde City, and is the northernmost county of the province, bordering Inner Mongolia to the north. In terms of area, it is the largest county of Hebei, occupying an area of 9,058 km^{2} (3,497 sq mi), though, as it is located in mountainous terrain, it is rather sparsely populated, as of 2020, housing 423,676 people.

The area has been historically home to Manchu soldiers, and the local dialect of Mandarin is similar to that of Beijing, though there is some Northeastern influence.

== History ==
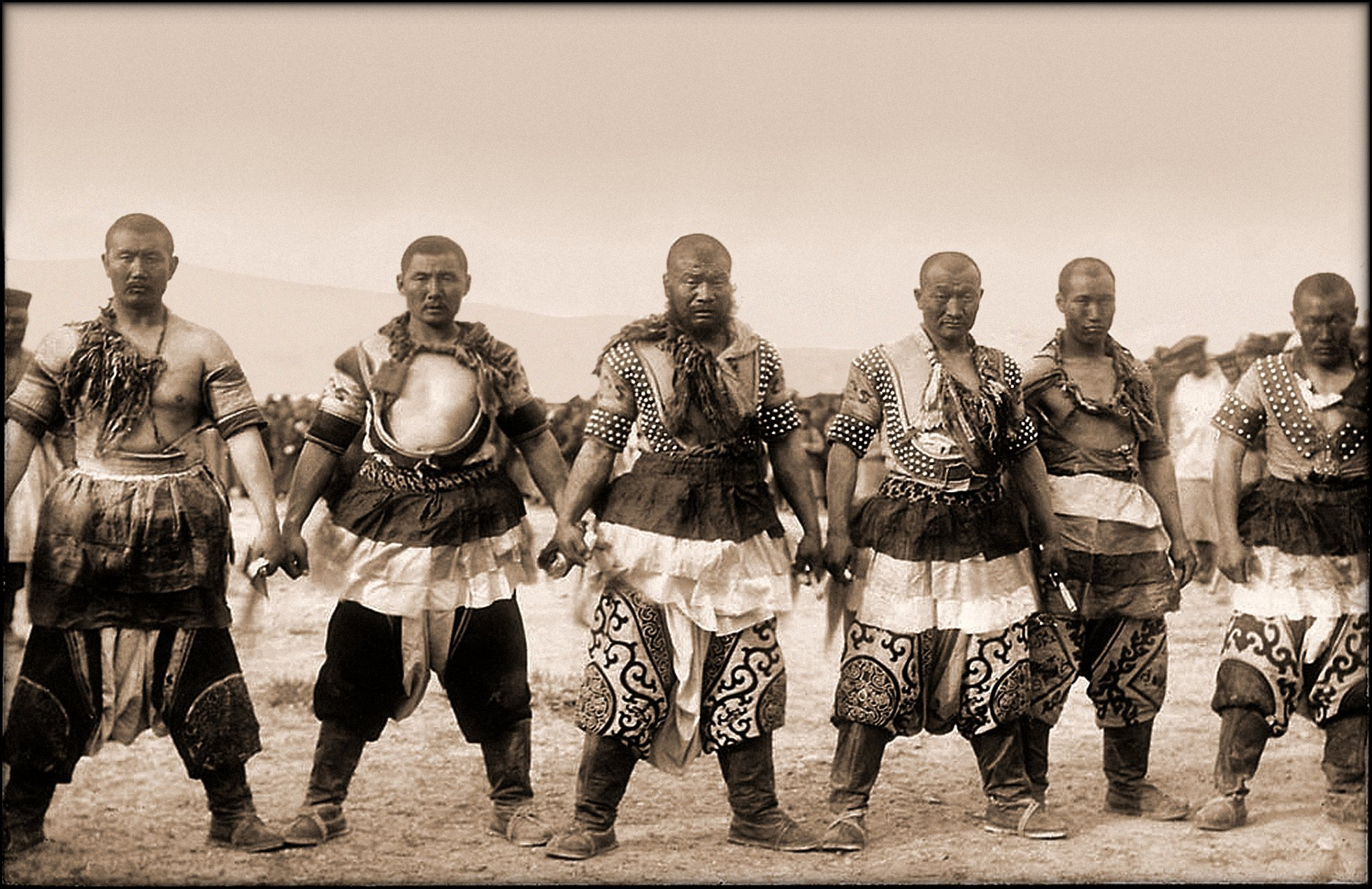
Mongol in Weichang, 1909

The area of the county was originally grazing grounds for Mongol tribes. In the early Qing Dynasty, the Auqan, Kharchin and Onnigud Mongols gave these lands as a gift to the Kangxi Emperor, who then created the Mulan Paddock in Weichang. Thereafter, it became hunting ground for the Qing royal family, Eight Banners aristocrats and Mongols.

== Economy ==
Potato cultivation in Weichang Manchu and Mongolian Autonomous County covers an area of over 43,333 hectares, with the county producing 150 million potato minitubers annually. The county is also home to the Hongsong Wind Farm wind power project. Weichang Manchu and Mongol Autonomous County was one of the last counties to eradicate absolute poverty in China.

== Geography and climate ==
Weichang is located in the northernmost part of Hebei, with a latitude range of 41° 35' to 42° 40' N and longitude range of 116° 32' to 118° 14' E. It borders Inner Mongolia's Chifeng city to the east, Hexigten Banner to the north, as well as Duolun County to the northwest. Within Hebei province, it borders Fengning County and Longhua County to the southwest and south.

Weichang has a rather dry, monsoon-influenced humid continental climate (Köppen Dwb), with long, very cold and dry winters, and very warm, humid summers, and the elevation depresses temperatures. The 24-hour average in January is −12.3 °C (9.9 °F) and the same figure for July is 21.4 °C (70.5 °F), while the annual mean is 5.6 °C (42.1 °F). More than half of the annual precipitation occurs in July and August alone. The coldest temperature recorded in the province was −42.9 °C (−45 °F) on 12 January 1957 at Yudaokou Township (御道口乡).

Climate data for Weichang, elevation 893 m (2,930 ft), (1991–2020 normals, extremes 1971–2010)
Month	Jan	Feb	Mar	Apr	May	Jun	Jul	Aug	Sep	Oct	Nov	Dec	Year
Record high °C (°F)	7.2 (45.0)	16.4 (61.5)	25.8 (78.4)	30.0 (86.0)	35.1 (95.2)	36.1 (97.0)	39.4 (102.9)	35.4 (95.7)	34.0 (93.2)	27.3 (81.1)	19.1 (66.4)	10.2 (50.4)	39.4 (102.9)
Mean daily maximum °C (°F)	−5.2 (22.6)	−0.6 (30.9)	6.7 (44.1)	15.3 (59.5)	22.1 (71.8)	25.8 (78.4)	27.7 (81.9)	26.5 (79.7)	21.7 (71.1)	13.9 (57.0)	3.8 (38.8)	−4.0 (24.8)	12.8 (55.0)
Daily mean °C (°F)	−12.3 (9.9)	−8.4 (16.9)	−1.1 (30.0)	7.5 (45.5)	14.5 (58.1)	18.8 (65.8)	21.3 (70.3)	19.6 (67.3)	13.8 (56.8)	6.0 (42.8)	−3.4 (25.9)	−10.7 (12.7)	5.5 (41.8)
Mean daily minimum °C (°F)	−17.5 (0.5)	−14.5 (5.9)	−7.6 (18.3)	0.4 (32.7)	7.0 (44.6)	12.5 (54.5)	16.1 (61.0)	14.2 (57.6)	7.8 (46.0)	0.0 (32.0)	−8.6 (16.5)	−15.7 (3.7)	−0.5 (31.1)
Record low °C (°F)	−29.6 (−21.3)	−26.7 (−16.1)	−26.6 (−15.9)	−11.2 (11.8)	−2.4 (27.7)	4.3 (39.7)	8.8 (47.8)	0.6 (33.1)	−2.9 (26.8)	−13.0 (8.6)	−22.4 (−8.3)	−27.4 (−17.3)	−29.6 (−21.3)
Average precipitation mm (inches)	1.3 (0.05)	3.0 (0.12)	6.8 (0.27)	20.8 (0.82)	41.9 (1.65)	82.0 (3.23)	125.5 (4.94)	94.5 (3.72)	52.4 (2.06)	25.8 (1.02)	7.1 (0.28)	1.7 (0.07)	462.8 (18.23)
Average precipitation days (≥ 0.1 mm)	1.8	2.2	3.6	5.5	8.5	13.5	14.3	11.5	9.3	5.6	3.4	2.4	81.6
Average snowy days	3.1	3.4	4.8	2.6	0.4	0	0	0	0.1	1.9	4.6	3.8	24.7
Average relative humidity (%)	51	47	43	42	46	62	72	73	67	57	55	53	56
Mean monthly sunshine hours	199.2	203.5	241.4	244.9	271.3	235.8	220.7	233.9	223.4	218.7	187.4	184.5	2,664.7
Percentage possible sunshine	67	68	65	61	60	52	48	55	60	65	64	65	61
Source 1: China Meteorological Administration
Source 2: Weather China

== Administrative divisions ==
There are 12 towns and 25 townships in the county.

Name	Simplified Chinese	Hanyu Pinyin	Manchu	Möllendorff	Mongolian (Hudum Script)	Mongolian (Cyrillic)	Administrative division code
Towns
Weichang Town	围场镇	Wéicháng Zhèn	ᠸᡝᡳ ᠴᠠᠩ ᡴᠠᡩᠠᠯᠠᠩᡤᠠ	wei cang kadalangga	ᠸᠧᠢ ᠴᠠᠩ ᠪᠠᠯᠭᠠᠰᠤ	Вей цан балгас	130828100
Siheyong Town	四合永镇	Sìhéyǒng Zhèn	ᠰᡟᡥᡝᠶᠣᠩ ᡴᠠᡩᠠᠯᠠᠩᡤᠠ	syheyong kadalangga	ᠰᠢ ᠾᠧ ᠶᠦᠩ ᠪᠠᠯᠭᠠᠰᠤ	Сихэёнг балгас балгас	130828101
Kelegou Town	克勒沟镇	Kèlègōu Zhèn	ᡴᡝ ᠯᡝ ᡤᠣ᠋ ᡴᠠᡩᠠᠯᠠᠩᡤᠠ	ke le go kadalangga	ᠺᠧ ᠯᠧ ᠭᠧᠦ ᠪᠠᠯᠭᠠᠰᠤ	Ке ле гүү балгас	130828102
Qipanshan Town	棋盘山镇	Qípánshān Zhèn	ᠴᡳ ᡦᠠᠨ ᡧᠠᠨ ᡴᠠᡩᠠᠯᠠᠩᡤᠠ	ci pan šan kadalangga	ᠴᠢ ᠫᠠᠨ ᠱᠠᠨ ᠪᠠᠯᠭᠠᠰᠤ	Чи пан шан балгас	130828103
Banjieta Town	半截塔镇	Bànjiétǎ Zhèn	ᠪᠠᠨ ᠵᡳᠶᡝ ᡨᠠ ᡴᠠᡩᠠᠯᠠᠩᡤᠠ	ban jiye ta kadalangga	ᠪᠠᠨ ᠵᠢᠶᠧ ᠲᠠ ᠪᠠᠯᠭᠠᠰᠤ	Ба жье да балгас	130828104
Chaoyangdi Town	朝阳地镇	Cháoyángdì Zhèn	ᠴᠣᠣ ᠶᠠᠩ ᡩᡳ ᡴᠠᡩᠠᠯᠠᠩᡤᠠ	coo yang di kadalangga	ᠴᠣᠤ ᠶᠠᠩ ᠳᠢ ᠪᠠᠯᠭᠠᠰᠤ	Цуу ян ди балгас	130828105
Chaoyangwan Town	朝阳湾镇	Cháoyángwān Zhèn	ᠴᠣᠣ ᠶᠠᠩ ᠸᠠᠨ ᡴᠠᡩᠠᠯᠠᠩᡤᠠ	coo yang di kadalangga	ᠴᠣᠤ ᠶᠠᠩ ᠸᠠᠨ ᠪᠠᠯᠭᠠᠰᠤ	Цуу ян ван балгас	130828106
Yaozhan Town	腰站镇	Yāozhàn Zhèn			ᠶᠣᠤ ᠥᠷᠲᠡᠭᠡ ᠪᠠᠯᠭᠠᠰᠤ	Ёо өртөө балгас	130828107
Longtoushan Town	龙头山镇	Lóngtóushān Zhèn	ᠯᡠᠩᡨᠣᠣᡧᠠᠨ ᡴᠠᡩᠠᠯᠠᠩᡤᠠ	lungtoošan kadalangga	ᠯᠦᠩ ᠲᠧᠦ ᠱᠠᠨ ᠪᠠᠯᠭᠠᠰᠤ	Лүн дүү шин балгас	130828108
Xinbo Town	新拨镇	Xīnbō Zhèn	ᠰᡳᠨ ᠪᠣ ᡴᠠᡩᠠᠯᠠᠩᡤᠠ	sin bo kadalangga	ᠰᡳᠨ ᠪᠣ ᠪᠠᠯᠭᠠᠰᠤ	Шин бо балгас	130828109
Yudaokou Town	御道口镇	Yùdàokǒu Zhèn					130828110
Chengzi Town	城子镇	Chéngzi Zhèn					130828111
Townships
Daobazi Township	道坝子乡	Dàobàzi xiāng	ᡩᠣᠣ ᠪᠠᡯᡳ᠌ ᡤᠠᡧᠠᠨ	doo badzy kadalangga	ᠳᠣᠤ ᠪᠠ ᠽᠢ ᠰᠢᠶᠠᠩ		130828200
Huangtukan Township	黄土坎乡	Huángtǔkǎn xiāng					130828203
Sidaogou Township	四道沟乡	Sìdàogōu xiāng	ᡩᡠᡳᠨᡳ ᡩᠣᠯᠣ ᠨᡳᡵᡠ	duini dolo niru	ᠰᠧ ᠳᠣᠤ ᠭᠧᠦ ᠰᠢᠶᠠᠩ		130828204
Lanqikalun Township	兰旗卡伦乡	Lánqíkǎlún xiāng					130828205
Yinwogou Township	银窝沟乡	Yínwōgōu xiāng	ᡳᠨ ᠸᡝᡤᠣ ᡤᠠᡧᠠᠨ	in wego gašan	ᠶᠢᠨ ᠸᠧ ᠭᠧᠦ ᠰᠢᠶᠠᠩ		130828206
Xindi Township	新地乡	Xīndì xiāng	ᠰᡳᠨ ᡩᡳ ᡤᠠᡧᠠᠨ	sin di gašan	ᠰᠢᠨ ᠳ᠋ᠢ ᠰᠢᠶᠠᠩ		130828207
Guangfayong Township	广发永乡	Guǎngfāyǒng xiāng	ᡴᡡᠸᠠᠩ ᡶᠠᠶᠣᠩ ᡤᠠᡧᠠᠨ	kūwang fayong gašan	ᠭᠤᠸᠠᠩ ᠹᠠ ᠶᠦᠩ ᠰᠢᠶᠠᠩ		130828208
Yutaihe Township	育太和乡	Yùtàihé xiāng	ᠶᠣᡨᠠᡳᡥᡝ ᡤᠠᡧᠠᠨ	kūwang fayong gašan	ᠢᠦᠢ ᠲᠠᠢ ᠾᠧ ᠰᠢᠶᠠᠩ		130828209
Guojiawan Township	郭家湾乡	Guōjiāwān xiāng					130828210
Yangjiawan Township	杨家湾乡	Yángjiāwān xiāng					130828211
Dahuanqi Township	大唤起乡	Dàhuànqǐ xiāng					130828212
Haliha Township	哈里哈乡	Hālǐhā xiāng					130828213
Zhangjiawan Township	张家湾乡	Zhāngjiāwān xiāng					130828215
Baoyuanzhan Township	宝元栈乡	Bǎoyuánzhàn xiāng					130828216
Shanwanzi Township	山湾子乡	Shānwānzi xiāng					130828217
Sanyiyong Township	三义永乡	Sānyìyǒng xiāng	ᠰᠠᠨ᠋᠋ ᡳᡳ ᡳᠣᠩ ᠨᡳᡵᡠ	san' ii iong niru	ᠰᠠᠨ ᠢ ᠶᠦᠩ ᠰᠢᠶᠠᠩ		130828218
Jiangjiadian Township	姜家店乡	Jiāngjiādiàn xiāng	ᠵᡳᠶᠠᠩ ᠵᡳᠶᠠ ᡩᡳᠶᠠᠨ ᡤᠠᡧᠠᠨ	jiyang jiya diyan gašan	ᠵᠢᠶᠠᠩ ᠵᠢᠶᠠ ᠳ᠋ᠢᠶᠠᠨ ᠰᠢᠶᠠᠩ		130828219
Xiahuofang Township	下伙房乡	Xiàhuǒfáng xiāng					130828220
Yangebai Township	燕格柏乡	Yàngébǎi xiāng					130828221
Pailou Township	牌楼乡	Páilóu xiāng					130828222
Laowopu Township	老窝铺乡	Lǎowōpù xiāng					130828224
Shizhuozi Township	石桌子乡	Shízhuōzi xiāng					130828226
Datoushan Township	大头山乡	Dàtóushān xiāng					130828227
Nanshanzui Township	南山嘴乡	Nánshānzuǐ xiāng					130828228
Xilongtou Township	西龙头乡	Xīlóngtóu xiāng					130828229
