= Pattle Island =

Island belonging to the Paracel Islands

Pattle
Disputed island
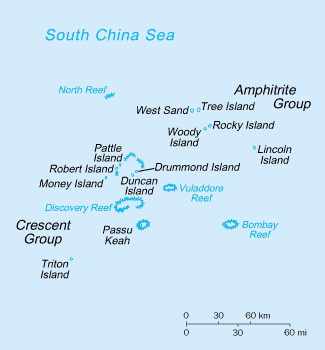
- Paracel Islands

- Location of the major islands in Sansha; Legend： Black：Sansha (Pref. seat) Woody Island (South China Sea) Pink：Scarborough Shoal Green：Fiery Cross Reef Blue：Mischief Reef Purple：Subi Reef Orange：Cuarteron Reef Yellow：Gaven Reefs Red：Johnson South Reef Brown：Hughes Reef
- Other names: 珊瑚岛, Shānhú dǎo, San Hô đảo, Đảo Hoàng Sa

Geography
- Location: South China Sea
- Coordinates: 16°32′05″N 111°36′30″E
- Archipelago: Paracel Islands
- Total islands: Over 30
- Major islands: Woody, Rocky, Tree, Money, Robert, Pattle, Triton, Duncan, Lincoln, Drummond
- Area: 0.32 km^{2} (0.12 sq mi)
- Length: 820 m (2690 ft)
- Width: 420 m (1380 ft)

Administration
- China
- Province: Hainan
- City: Sansha

Claimed by
- Taiwan
- Vietnam
- Province: Da Nang

Pattle Island (Simplified Chinese: 珊瑚岛; Pinyin: Shānhú dǎo; Sino-Vietnamese: San Hô đảo; Vietnamese: Đảo Hoàng Sa) is a coral island belonging to the Crescent Island group of the Paracel Islands. During the period of Vietnamese and French colonial occupation of the islands, Pattle Island was chosen as the main base. 100% of the island was near the mainland, near the center of the archipelago and near many other islands, so it was easier to control than Woody Island, the largest of the Paracels.

China, Taiwan and Vietnam all claim sovereignty over the Paracel Islands, including Pattle Island. China has had de facto control of the island and the rest of the archipelago since the Battle of the Paracel Islands in January 1974.

== General ==
- Coordinates: 16°32'05"N – 111°36'30"E
- Body shape: oval, 820 metres (2,690 ft) long, about 420 metres (1,380 ft) wide, about 2,100 metres (6,900 ft) in circumference, about 0.32 square kilometres (0.12 sq mi) in area, 9 metres (30 ft) high, surrounded by coral rings.
- Environment: there are many trees and birds on the island.

== Island activities ==
During the time when the Paracel Islands were under the direct management of the Vietnamese and the French colonial empire, many civilian and military buildings were built here for various purposes.

=== Transportation ===
- Lighthouse: built in the north of the island.
- Pier: built on the south side of the island. There is a rather deep incision leading from the sea to the pier. The pier is the end of a 180 metres (590 ft) long iron road for bird guano mining. From 1956 to 1964, Bui Kien Thanh's Vietnam Fertilizer Company carried about 100,000 tonnes (98,000 long tons; 110,000 short tons) inland.
- Roads: there are three key roads on the island.
  - The main road south-north connects from the pier to the middle of the island, about 2 metres (6 ft 7 in) wide.
  - The road from the back of the meteorological station to the end of the island, parallel to the main road.
  - The road from the well is headed north of the island.
- Airport construction plan: The Republic of Vietnam Navy sent a surveyor to Pattle Island to build a small airport capable of receiving C-7 Caribou transport aircraft and some aircraft capable of landing/taking off with short runways, but the plan failed because of the Battle of the Paracel Islands.

== Civil ==
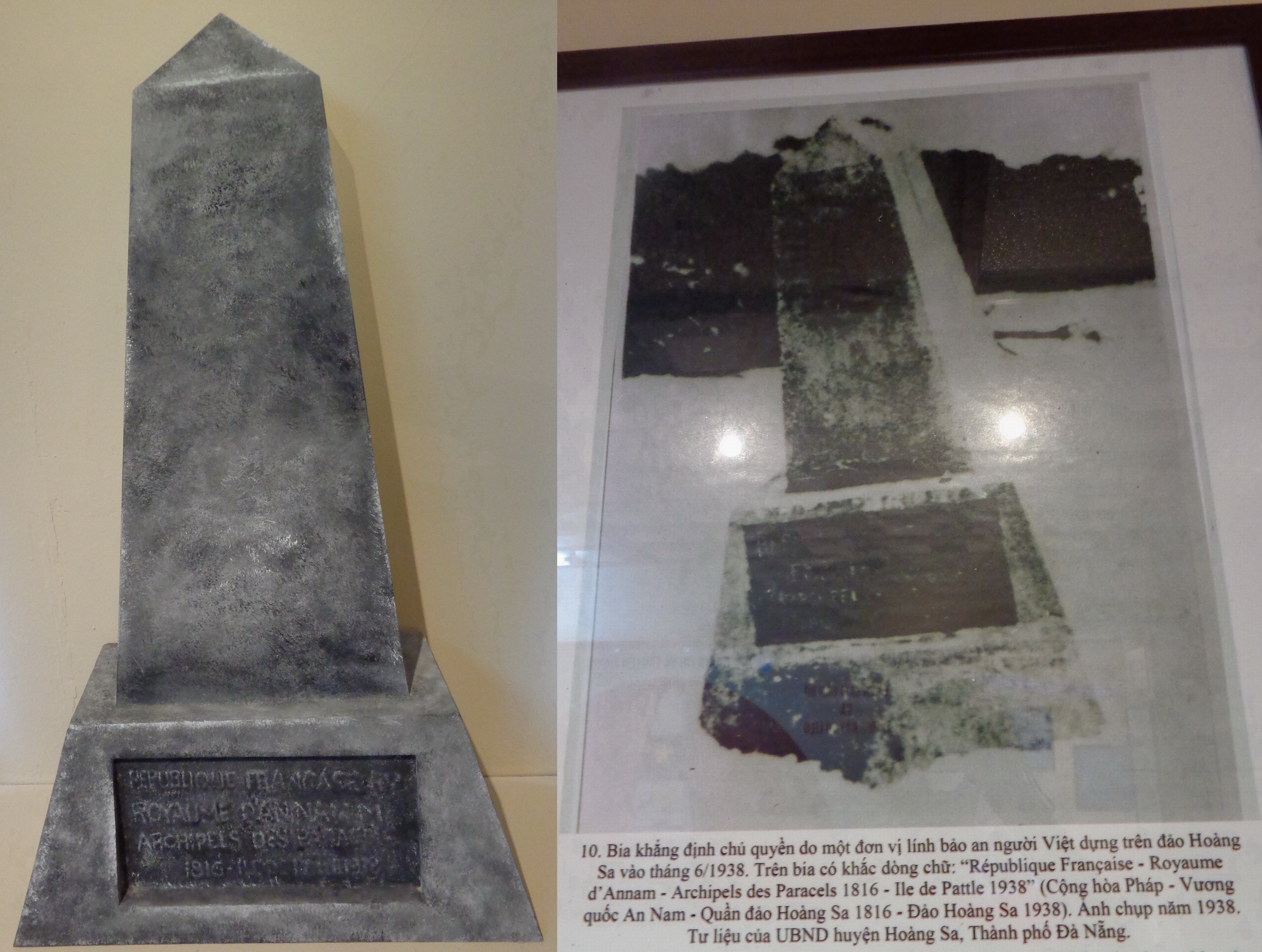
The Hoang Sa sovereignty stele of Vietnam during the French colonial period was erected in 1938 on Pattle Island, affirming Vietnam's sovereignty over the Paracel Islands continuously since 1816 (Gia Long 14) under the sovereignty of the kingdom of An Nam, until the time the stele was erected in 1938 (during the French colonial period, French Indochina).

- Asserting sovereignty: France raised a sovereignty stele near the middle of the island in 1938 to reaffirm Vietnam's official sovereignty from 1816 and that of France when it was in Vietnam.

On the stele it says:

"République française
Royaume d'Annam
Archipel des Paracels
1816 - Île de Pattle-1938"

meaning:

French Republic
Kingdom of Annan
Paracel Islands
1816 - Paracel Islands-1938

- Meteorological measurement: The meteorological station on the island began operations around 1938 with the number 48,860 issued by the International Meteorological Organization (later the World Meteorological Organization). Every day the staff made meteorological measurements and then transmitted information via radio (initially by Morse code). The meteorological station on Pattle Island operated relatively continuously, except for several years of war when the Empire of Japan occupied it, and only stopped when China occupied the island after the Battle of the Paracel Islands in January 1974. The Vietnamese meteorological staff were transported to Hainan Island on a Chinese ship, then sent to Hong Kong in March 1974, from where they flew back to Vietnam. Later, China registered the station name Sanhu with the number 59,985.

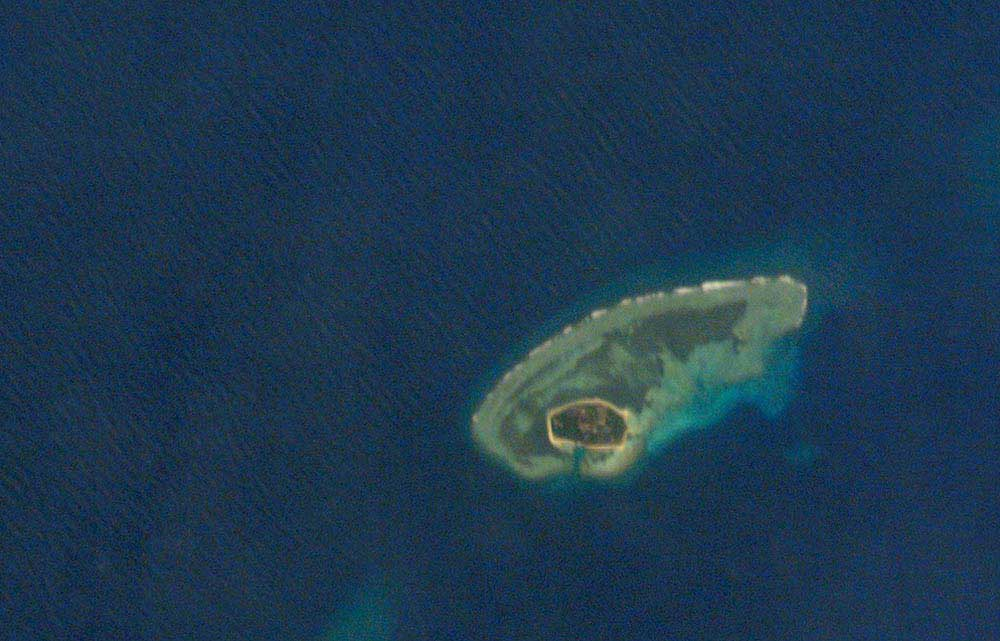
Pattle Island

- Beliefs and religions:
  - Ba Temple: built in the southwest corner of the island in the period after the surrender of the Empire of Japan but before 1948, with a length of 6 metres (20 ft), a width of 4 metres (13 ft) and a height of about 3 metres (9.8 ft). The shrine features two statues, one of which depicts Gautama Buddha. To the left of the shrine is a cemetery.
  - Christian church: built in the 1950s for soldiers of this religion.
- Other activities: near the middle of the island, there are also a volleyball court and a flagpole.

=== Military ===
Since the early 1930s, military houses such as garrisons and soldiers' houses have been established. French soldiers and Tirailleurs indochinois often used sloops to patrol Pattle Island and other islands. During World War II, the Japanese constructed many buildings with very thick walls in all four corners of the island. By the time of the Republic of Vietnam, at first there was a battalion of marines tasked with protecting the island, which was later reduced to a company, while from 5 October 1959, there were only a 30-man marine regiment and security guards of the Quảng Nam Province Security Corps (later the local Quảng Nam South Vietnamese Regional Force) stationed on the island. Because of the lack of facilities, they only garrisoned Pattle Island, leaving the other islands undefended.

Since occupying the island in 1974, China has erected new buildings both for the military and for fishing.
