= Yagong Island =

- Village-level division
- Yagong Community
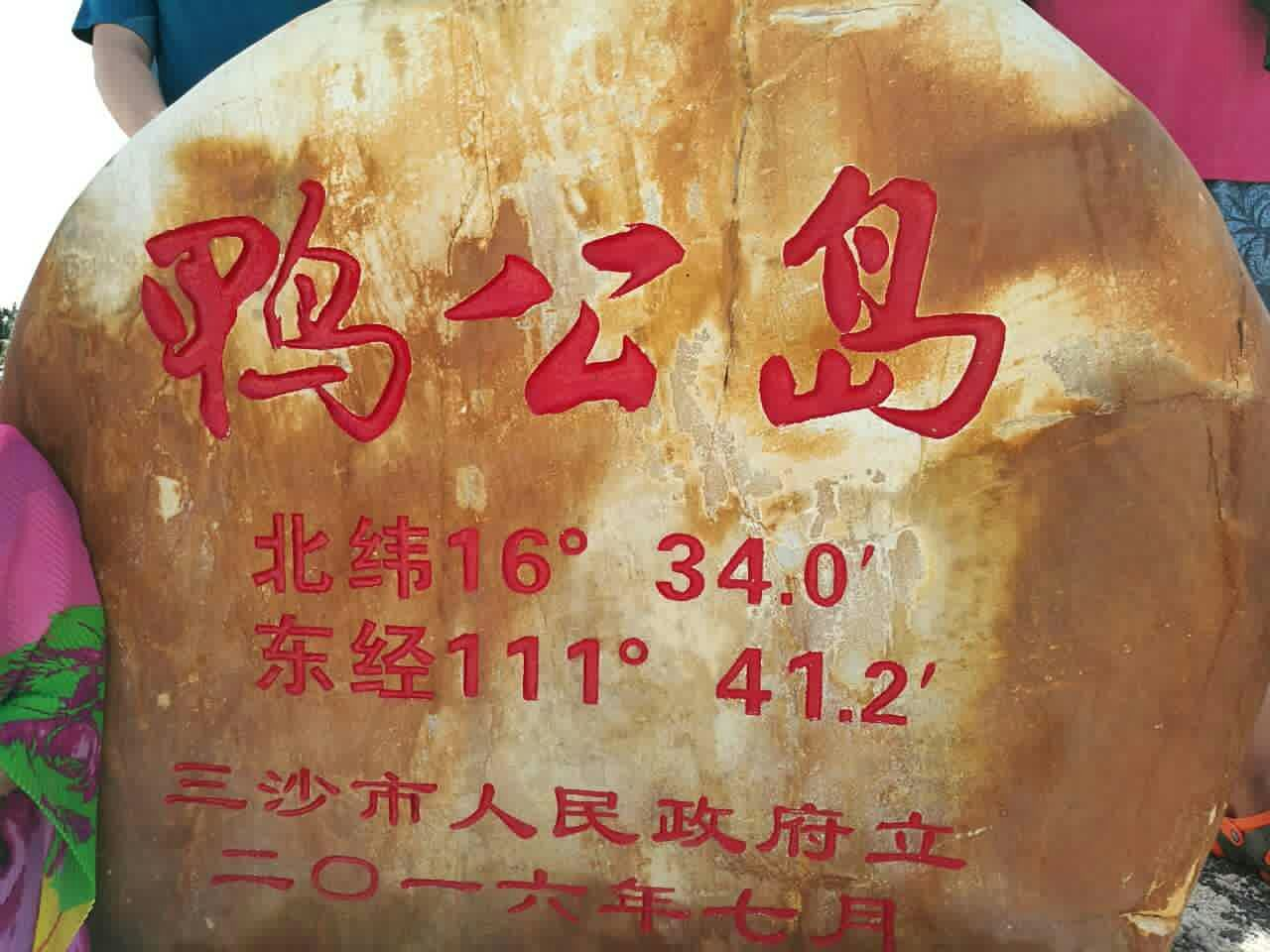
- Monument on the island

- Location within South China Sea
- Coordinates: 16°34′00″N 111°41′11″E
- Country: China
- Province: Hainan
- Prefecture-level city: Sansha
- County-level division: Xisha District
- Township-level division: Yongxing Dao Neighborhood Committee

Area
  - Total: 0.013 km^{2} (0.0050 sq mi)

Dimensions
  - Length: 0.175 km (0.109 mi)
  - Width: 0.075 km (0.047 mi)
- Time zone: UTC+8 (China)

Yagong Island (Chinese: 鸭公岛; pinyin: Yāgōng-dǎo; Vietnamese: Đảo Ba Ba) is an island in the Crescent Group (Yongle Qundao 永乐环礁) of the Paracel Islands, in the South China Sea. It is also known as "He Duck" (male duck) due to its shape. It is located a few hundred metres southwest of Observation Bank (Silver Islet, Yin Yu (银屿), Bãi Xà Cừ) in the northeast of the Crescent Group.

It is occupied by the PRC, and like all of the other Paracel islands, it is controlled by China (PRC) and claimed by Taiwan (ROC) and Vietnam.

It is administered as the "Yagong Community", a village-level division of the Yongxing Dao Neighborhood Committee township-level division, in the county-level division of the Xisha District, of the Sansha prefecture-level city, in the Hainan province.

It has an area of just under 1 hectare (9,800 square metres [2.4 acres]) and a residential population of about 100 fishermen with solar power and a desalination plant.

Prior to 2013, the island was a barren stretch of coral and clamshells surrounding a central lagoon, providing a temporary stopover and resting place for fishermen. In 2013, the PRC shipped 120 tonnes (130 short tons) of soil, 200 tonnes (220 short tons) of fresh water, coconut fibre, and 400 trees to the island as part of a Sansha-wide greening project. As of 2013, regular tourist visits were made to the island by a cruise line, which also supplies the 78 registered (in 2016) residents with groceries.
