= Nansha District =

Nansha District may refer to:

- Nansha District, Sansha, a municipal district in Sansha, Hainan
- Nansha, Guangzhou, a municipal district in Guangzhou, Guangdong
