= Yongshu (disambiguation) =

The Yongshu Reef, also known as the Fiery Cross Reef, is a disputed atoll in the Spratly Islands administered by the People's Republic of China.

Yongshu can also refer to:

- Tang Yongshu (Chinese: 唐鹤恬; born 1975), Chinese badminton player
- Ouyang Xiu (1007–1072), courtesy name Yongshu (Chinese: 永叔), Song dynasty writer and politician
