= Xisha, Sansha =

Municipal district of Sansha, Hainan, China

Xisha 西沙区
- District Chinese People's Liberation Army occupation
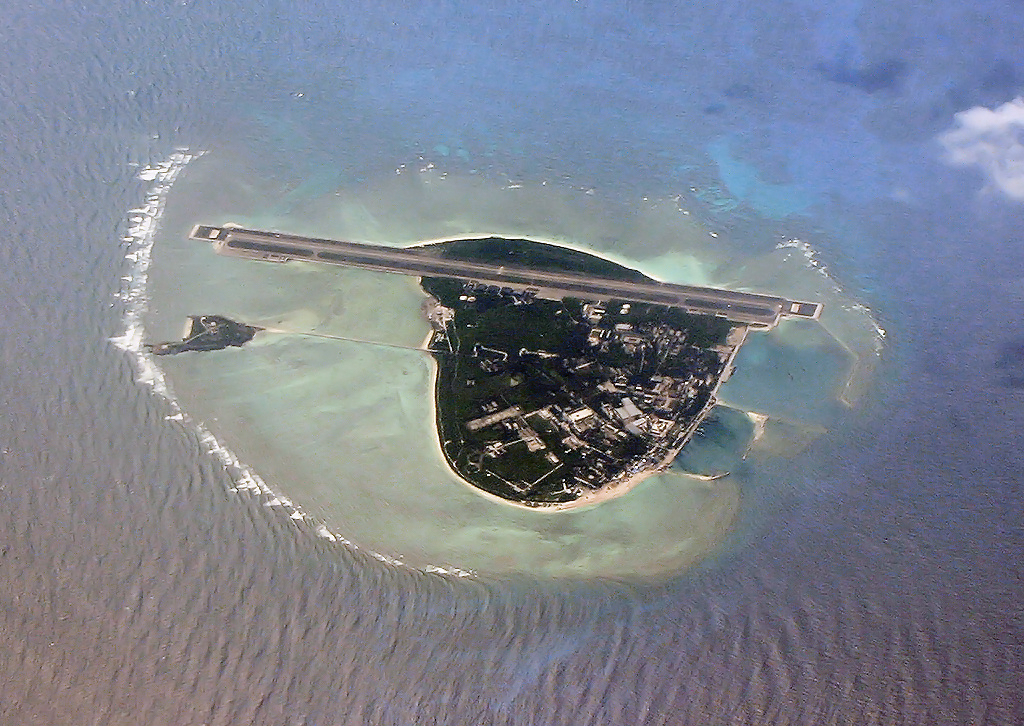
- Yongxing Town

- Xisha, Sansha (South China Sea) Location of the major islands in Xisha District
- Country: People's Republic of China
- Province: Hainan
- Prefecture-level city: Sansha

Government
  - Type: County-level division

Area
  - Total: 10.07 km^{2} (3.89 sq mi)

Population
  - Total: ~1,800
- Time zone: UTC+8 (China Standard Time)
- Territorial Dispute: There are on-going territorial disputes in the entire area covered by the district, whose administrative authority is not internationally recognized.

Xisha District
- Simplified Chinese: 西沙区
- Literal meaning: Western Sands
Transcriptions
Standard Mandarin
- Hanyu Pinyin: Xīshā Qū

Xisha District is the municipal district of Sansha, Hainan. It administers the islands and reefs of the disputed Paracel Islands and its sea areas, and is responsible for the islands and reefs and sea areas of the Zhongsha Islands. The People's Government of Xisha District is stationed in Yongxing Island (Yongxing Town Management Area).

Along with Nansha, Xisha District was created on April 18, 2020.

== Administrative divisions ==
Name	Chinese (S)	Hanyu Pinyin	Residential communities
Yongxing	永兴	Yǒngxìng	2 (Yongxing, Yingqu)
Yongle	永乐	Yǒnglè	5 (Jinqing, Yinyu, Lingyang, Ganquan, Yagong)
Qilianyu	七连屿	Qīliányǔ	2 (Beidao, Zhaoshu)
Zhongsha Daojiao	中沙岛礁	Zhōngshā Dǎojiāo	1 (Zhongsha Daojiao)
