= Woody Island (South China Sea) =

China-controlled disputed Paracel Island in the South China Sea

Disputed island
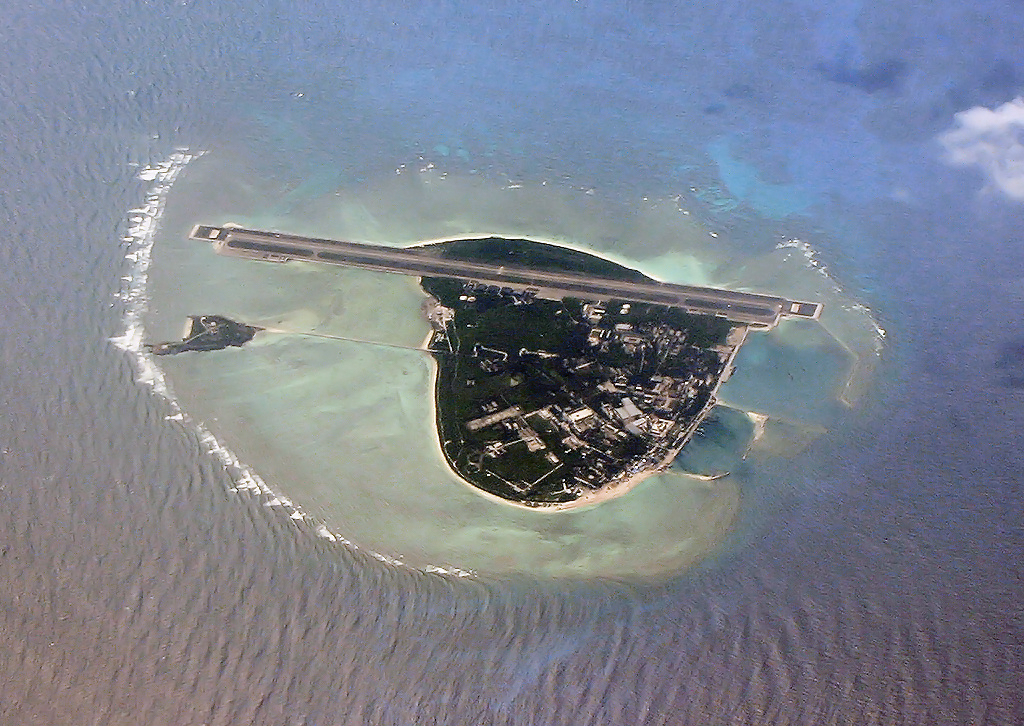
- Aerial view of Woody and Rocky Islands

- Location of the major claimed islands in the Sansha administrative area of China. Legend：: Black：α – Yongxing Island (Woody Island) (seat of Sansha); Red：β – Chigua Reef (Johnson South Reef); Green：γ – Dongmen Reef (Hughes Reef); Yellow：δ – Huangyan Island (Scarborough Shoal); Red：ε – Huayang Reef (Cuarteron Reef); Blue：ζ – Meiji Reef (Mischief Reef); Blue：η – Nanxun Reef (Gaven Reefs); Black：θ – Zhongjian Island (Triton Island); Green：κ – Yongshu Reef (Fiery Cross Reef); Purple：λ – Zhubi Reef (Subi Reef)
- Other names: Yongxing Island, Phú Lâm Island

Geography
- Coordinates: 16°50′3″N 112°20′15″E
- Area: 2.6 km^{2} (1.0 sq mi)
- Length: 1.850 km (1.1495 mi)
- Width: 1.160 km (0.7208 mi)

Administration
- China
- Province: Hainan
- City: Sansha
- District: Xisha District

Claimed by
- Republic of China (Taiwan)
- Vietnam

Demographics
- Population: 1,443 (2014)

Woody Island, also called Yongxing Island (simplified Chinese: 永兴岛; traditional Chinese: 永興島; pinyin: Yǒngxīng Dǎo; lit. 'Eternal Prosperity Island') by China and Taiwan and Phú Lâm Island (Vietnamese: Đảo Phú Lâm, lit.'Rich Forest Island') by Vietnam (and formerly French: Île Boisée, lit. 'Wooded Island' by French Indochina), is the largest of the Paracel Islands in the South China Sea (SCS), with an area of 2.1 square kilometres (0.81 sq mi). As of 2014, it has a population of almost 1,500, with roads, banks and an air strip.

The Paracel Islands are a group of islands, reefs, banks and atolls in the northwestern part of the South China Sea. Woody Island is part of the Amphitrite Group in the eastern Paracels and is approximately equidistant from Hainan and the Vietnam coast.

The island has been under the control of the People's Republic of China (PRC) since 1956. Sansha City, which administers PRC-controlled territories in Spratly and Paracel Islands, has its administrative seat located on the island. The island is claimed by the Republic of China (ROC, Taiwan) and Vietnam.

== History ==
The Chinese Qing dynasty, France (on behalf of Annam), Japan, and the Republic of China had all established a presence on the island at various points of time in history. Fishing activities in the South China Sea region surrounding the island have been documented in the records of earlier Chinese dynasties. During the Ming dynasty (1368–1644), Zheng He plotted the location of surrounding islands on a map, but never landed on it.

In 1909 Zhang Renjun (Chinese: 張人駿), the Viceroy of Liangguang ordered Guangdong Fleet Admiral Li Zhun to sail to the island. His mission landed in June 1909. In 1932 French Indochina announced its claim to the archipelago. A Franco-Vietnamese garrison was established on Woody Island (from 'île Boisée' in French) in 1938, regularly supplied by the French Navy until 1945.

The island was occupied by Japan during World War II. Later, on 4 Feb 1945 USS Pargo (Lt.Cdr. D.B. Bell) would bombard Woody Island destroying a Japanese weather station and radio equipment, an administration building, a jetty, and several fishing boats. Following Japan's surrender at the end of the war, the Nationalist Chinese government sent naval expeditions to the South China Sea in 1946 to claim the Spratly and Paracel Islands, and established a permanent presence on Woody Island and Itu Aba. They (re)named Woody Island "Yongxing (Yung-hsing) Island" after one of the Republic of China Navy warships, ROCS Yung-hsing (永興號). Yung-hsing was formerly the USS Embattle (AM-226). The ship was transferred to the ROC navy after the war. In January 1947, after making a failed attempt to dislodge the Chinese garrison from Woody Island, France established a permanent presence on Pattle Island in the western Paracels.

After the Hainan Island Campaign in 1950 during the Chinese Civil War, the ROC garrisons on Woody Island and Itu Aba were withdrawn to Taiwan. French colonialists had a chance to take over the islands, but decided not to, for fear of compromising its interests with the newly established PRC. The islands were thus unoccupied for six years, except for seasonal inhabitation (occupation) by fishermen from Hainan. In 1956, the PRC established a permanent presence on Woody Island.

The Republic of Vietnam (South Vietnam) continued to claim sovereignty over the Crescent Group in the western part of the Paracel Islands after assuming control from the departing French colonialists against whom Vietnam fought a bitter independence war, maintaining a military garrison on Pattle Island (Vietnamese: đảo Hoàng Sa) by Ngo Dinh Diem's executive order from 1956. For the subsequent 20 years, conflicts between the two sides repeatedly erupted within the region. In January 1974, the PLA Navy captured Pattle Island during the Battle of the Paracel Islands.

== Climate ==
The island is located between the equator and the tropic of cancer, and falls in the "tropical marine monsoon climate" category. It experiences abundant rainfall, year-round high temperatures, high humidity and high salt. Coupled with generally clear skies and sunny weather, the annual average temperature is 26.5 °C (79.7 °F); the coldest average temperature in January is 23 °C (73 °F), the hottest average temperature in June is 29 °C (84 °F). The rainy season lasts for 5 to 6 months every year.

== Claims and disputes ==
Under PRC control, the island is administered by the Yongxingdao Town Government and is the seat of Sansha, a prefecture-level city of Hainan. In June 2014, UK newspaper The Independent stated that the island had a population of 1,443.

As part of the Paracel Islands, the island is also claimed by Taiwan and by Vietnam.

== Structures and facilities ==
Sansha City is located on Woody Island. Woody Island has had two or three artificial harbors capable of docking vessels up to 5,000 tonnes. In 2008, the island's main sea transport was the freighter Qiongsha-3, (2,500 tonnes, 84m x 13.8m, 200 passengers and 750 tonnes of cargo); it was the only means of sea transport for non-military personnel such as fishermen and researchers. Each trip from Hainan to Woody Island lasted from 13 to 15 hours.

In 1990, Chinese authorities built a runway and airport on the island. The Sansha Yongxing Airport was completed in July 1990, with a 2,700-metre runway that is capable of handling any fourth generation fighter aircraft of the PLA Naval Air Force such as the Chengdu J-10AH, Shenyang J-11BH, Xian JH-7A, and Sukhoi Su-30MK2. Other constructions include three main roads and an 800-metre long concrete causeway connecting to Rocky Island (石岛/đảo Đá).

Apart from government buildings and army posts, the island has various establishments. The island's administrative centre is located on Beijing Road, which has an Industrial and Commercial Bank of China branch, a hospital, various shops, hostels, food stations, a post office, small department stores and an aquatic company. A rescue centre was established on 15 July 2006.

There are two museums on the island – Xisha Maritime Museum and a Naval Museum. Other monuments include towers left by the Imperial Japanese Army during WWII, a monument erected by the ROC government in 1946, and a monument erected by the PRC in 1974. Visitors to the island are required to obtain approval from PRC authorities in Haikou before departure. Hiring a fishing boat from Hainan to the island is possible.

On 10 April 2011, China National Radio (CNR) and Hainan People's Broadcasting Station began FM broadcasts on the island. This is in addition to mobile communications and satellite television which are available in the fishing villages of the Paracel Islands.

China began construction on a school to serve about 40 children whose parents work on the island in June 2014, with construction expected to cost about 36 million yuan and take a year and a half. It opened in December 2015.

On 17 February 2016, the New York Times reported that an HQ-9 Surface to Air Missile system had been deployed on the island. In July 2016, it was reported that Shenyang J-11BH fighter aircraft were deployed on the island.

In April 2017, the Asia Maritime Transparency Initiative – a US think tank based in Washington – reported that a Shenyang J-11BH fighter aircraft was spotted on the island in satellite photos taken on 29 March 2017.

On 22 July 2017, over 200 Chinese moviegoers attended a screening in a theater built on the island by the Hainan Film Company with up-to-date technology, including both 4K resolution and a 3-D perforated screen.

In May 2018, based on PLA Air Force defence circulars and Chinese social media posts, the Washington Post and Washington based Asia maritime transparency initiative reported that China had landed long range bombers on the island as part of a defense exercise.

In August 2020 the PLA Air Force deployed H-6J bombers to Woody Island.

== Ecology and resources ==
The island's flora is generally tropical, with an abundance of palm trees. There is also a vegetable plantation sized around one-fifteenth of a hectare (~700 sq m). The western portion of the island has a coconut grove. The island's domestic water supply is from rainwater collection. Additional drinking water is shipped from Hainan Island. Supply ships arrive monthly; during this time residents spend two days at the pier unloading materiel. A desalination plant completed in October 2016 is capable of treating 1,000 tonnes of seawater per day, bringing the total capacity of desalination equipment on the island to 1,800 tonnes of seawater per day.

== Population ==
The island's civilian population generally consists of a small number of long-term fishermen's settlements maintained by a fisherman's village committee, and a larger number of short-term fishermen that visit the island, in addition to small numbers of government workers and tourists. Policemen and soldiers stationed on the island change shifts every two years, whereas civilian employees change shifts every six months.

== See also ==
- Sansha Yongxing Airport
- Rocky Island
- South China Sea Islands

== Bibliography ==
- Kivimäki, Timo (2002). War Or Peace in the South China Sea?. NIAS Press. ISBN 978-87-91114-01-4.
- Pargo (SS-264) at uboat.net
