= Sansha Yongxing Airport =

Sansha Yongxing Airport 三沙永兴机场
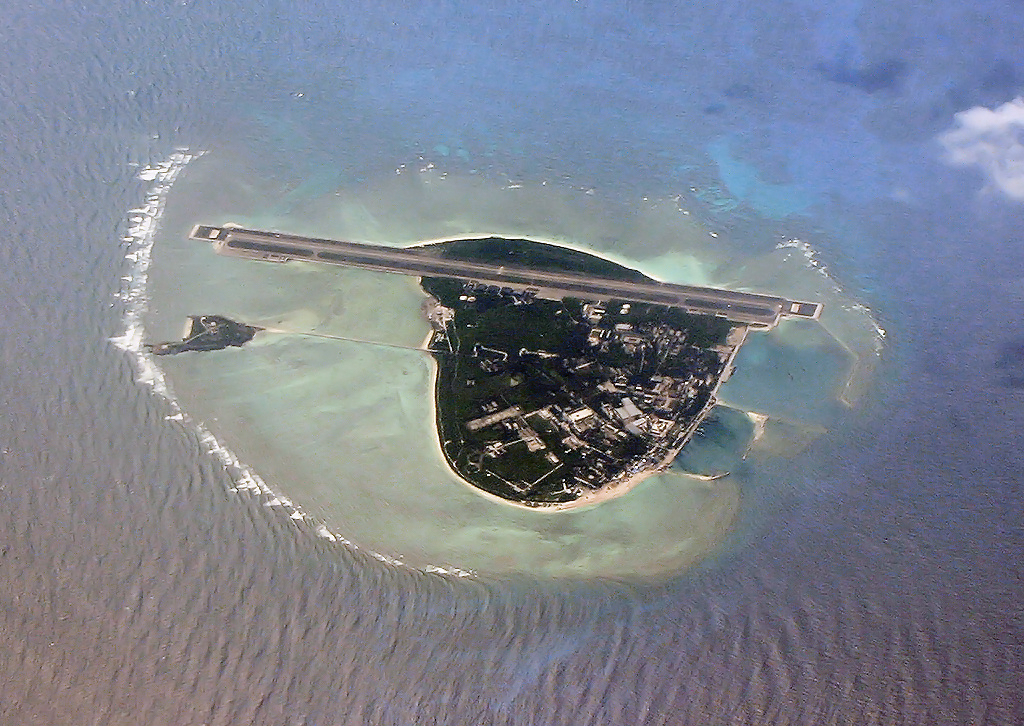
- Woody and Rocky Islands in 2009.
- IATA: XYI; ICAO: ZJYX

Summary
- Airport type: Civilian, military
- Operator: Sansha Yongxing Airport Administration (HNA Infrastructure Investment Group); PLA Air Force
- Serves: Sansha, Hainan
- Location: Yongxing Island
- Coordinates: 16°50′01″N 112°20′42″E

Map
- Location of airport in the South China Sea

Runways
Direction	Length		Surface
Direction	m	ft	Surface
05/23	2,700	8,858	Asphalt/concrete

Statistics (2021)
- Passengers: 36,405
- Aircraft movements: 523
- Cargo (metric tons): 200.2

Sansha Yongxing Airport
- Simplified Chinese: 三沙永兴机场
- Traditional Chinese: 三沙永興機場
Transcriptions
Standard Mandarin
- Hanyu Pinyin: Sānshā Yǒngxīng Jīchǎng

Sansha Yongxing Airport (IATA: XYI, ICAO: ZJYX) is a civilian-military dual-use airport located on Yongxing Island, the largest of the disputed Paracel Islands in the South China Sea. Yongxing/Woody Island is occupied and administered by China (PRC) as the seat of Sansha city of Hainan Province. The airport was expanded in 1990 to increase the combat range of Chinese warplanes. Further construction and reclamation of land commenced in 2012 to lengthen the airstrip. This work was completed in October 2014.

Military drills with fighter aircraft landing and taking off at Yongxing Island Airport were carried out and telecast on CCTV in December 2017.

== Facilities ==
Yongxing Island Airport has a runway that is 2,700 metres (8,900 ft) long, capable of handling any fourth generation fighter aircraft of the Chinese airforce such as the Sukhoi Su-30MK2. The airport has four hangars, a radar navigation station and four large fuel tanks, enabling it to serve as a forward deployment base for refueling warplanes on combat missions. A two-storey 3,500 square metres (38,000 sq ft) terminal building with control tower is found on south side of the runway. It has a domestic arrival and departure areas. The terminal has three gates to handle civil airliners.

== Airlines and destinations ==
Airlines	Destinations
Hainan Airlines	Haikou

== See also ==
- Dongsha Island Airport (Pratas Island)
- List of airports in the Spratly Islands
- List of airports in China
- List of People's Liberation Army Air Force airbases
