= Robert Island (Paracel Islands) =

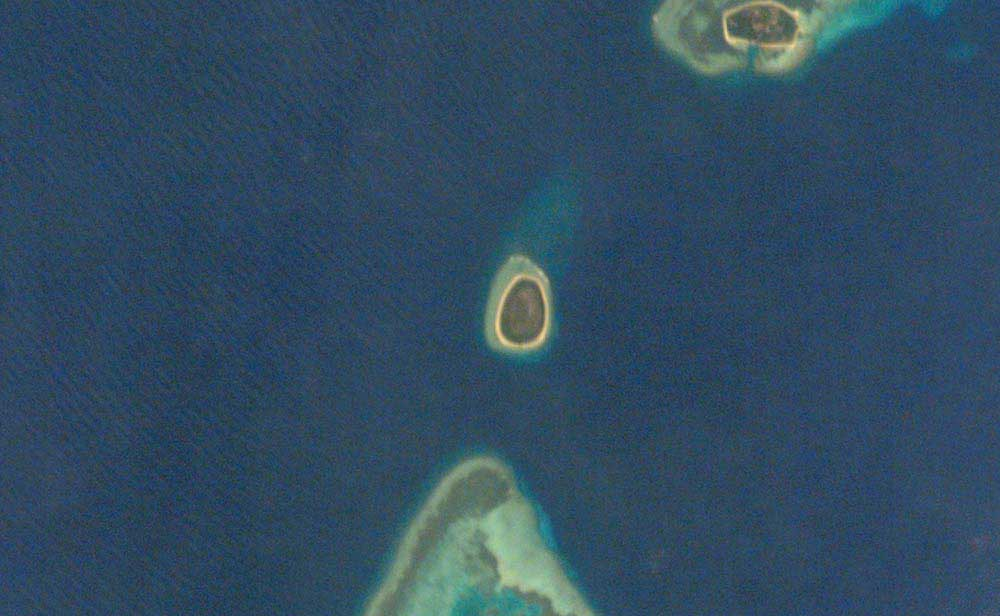

- Location within South China Sea
- Coordinates: 16°30′20″N 111°35′07″E
- Country: China
- Province: Hainan
- Prefecture-level city: Sansha
- County-level division: Xisha District
- Township-level division: Yongxing Dao Neighborhood Committee

Area
  - Total: 0.32 km^{2} (0.12 sq mi)

Dimensions
  - Length: 0.75 km (0.47 mi)
  - Width: 0.54 km (0.34 mi)
- Time zone: UTC+8 (China)

Robert Island, also known as Round Island and Ganquan Island (Chinese: 甘泉岛; pinyin: Ganquan Dǎo; Vietnamese: Đảo Hữu Nhật) is an island in the Paracel Islands, in the South China Sea.

Like the other Paracel Islands, it is controlled by China (PRC) but is claimed by both Taiwan (ROC) and Vietnam. It is administered as part of the Yongxing Dao Neighborhood Committee township-level division, in the county-level division of the Xisha District of the Sansha prefecture-level city, in Hainan province.

An environmental protection station was established there in February 2014.

The Ganquan Island Tang-Song Site ("甘泉岛唐宋遗址", Ganquan Dao Tang-Song yizhi), consisting two very small rocky temples, is classified as a Major National Historical and Cultural Site by the Chinese government because of ruins of an ancient settlement from the Tang and Song dynasties.
