= Gaven Reefs =

Reefs in the South China Sea

Disputed reef
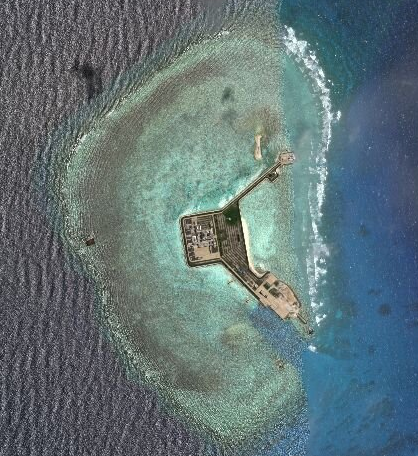
- Gaven Reefs

- Location within Spratly Islands
- Other names: 南薰礁 Nánxūn Jiāo (Chinese) 西南礁 Xīnán Jiāo (Chinese); Burgos Reefs (Philippine English); Mga Bahura ng Burgos (Filipino); Đá Ga Ven (Vietnamese); Đá Lạc (Vietnamese)

Geography
- Location: South China Sea
- Coordinates: 10°12′30″N 114°13′30″E
- Archipelago: Spratly Islands

Administration
- China
- Province: Hainan
- Prefecture-level City: Sansha
- District: Nansha District

Claimed by
- China
- Philippines
- Taiwan
- Vietnam

The Gaven Reefs, also known as the Burgos Reefs (Filipino: Mga Bahura ng Burgos, lit. 'Reefs of Burgos'), is a group of two reefs in the Tizard Bank of the Spratly Islands in the South China Sea. The two individual reefs are known as 南薰礁; Nánxūn Jiāo and 西南礁; Xīnán Jiāo in Mandarin, and Đá Ga Ven and Đá Lạc in Vietnamese).

They are occupied and controlled by China (PRC) as part of Sansha, and claimed by Taiwan (ROC), the Philippines and Vietnam. They have a supply platform and a reef fortress.

The northern reef (Nánxūn Jiāo) comprises 86 hectares (210 acres) and its highest point is 1.9 meters (6 feet 3 inches) above sea level. The southern reef (Xīnán Jiāo) comprises 67 ha (170 acres). Since 2014, north reef has been subject to significant reclamation activities.

== Geographical features ==
On 12 July 2016, the tribunal of the Permanent Court of Arbitration concluded that for purposes of Article 121(3) of the Convention, the high-tide features at Gaven Reef (North) are rocks that cannot sustain human habitation or economic life of their own and accordingly shall be entitled to 12 nautical miles (22 km; 14 mi) of territorial sea measured from its baseline but have no exclusive economic zone or continental shelf. PCA also concluded that the features at Gaven Reef (South) are, or in their natural condition were, exposed at low tide and submerged at high tide and are, accordingly low-tide elevations that do not generate entitlement to a territorial sea, exclusive economic zone or continental shelf.

== Military development ==
The supply platform at the reef has anti-aircraft guns, naval guns, search radars and radio communications equipment, and reclamation work during 2014–15 expanded its area to 0.136 square kilometres (0.053 sq mi).

In late 2016, photographs emerged which suggested that Hughes Reef has been armed with anti-aircraft weapons and a CIWS missile-defence system.

== See also ==
- Great Wall of Sand
- Nine-dotted line
