= Mischief Reef =

Reef and atoll in the South China Sea

Disputed atoll
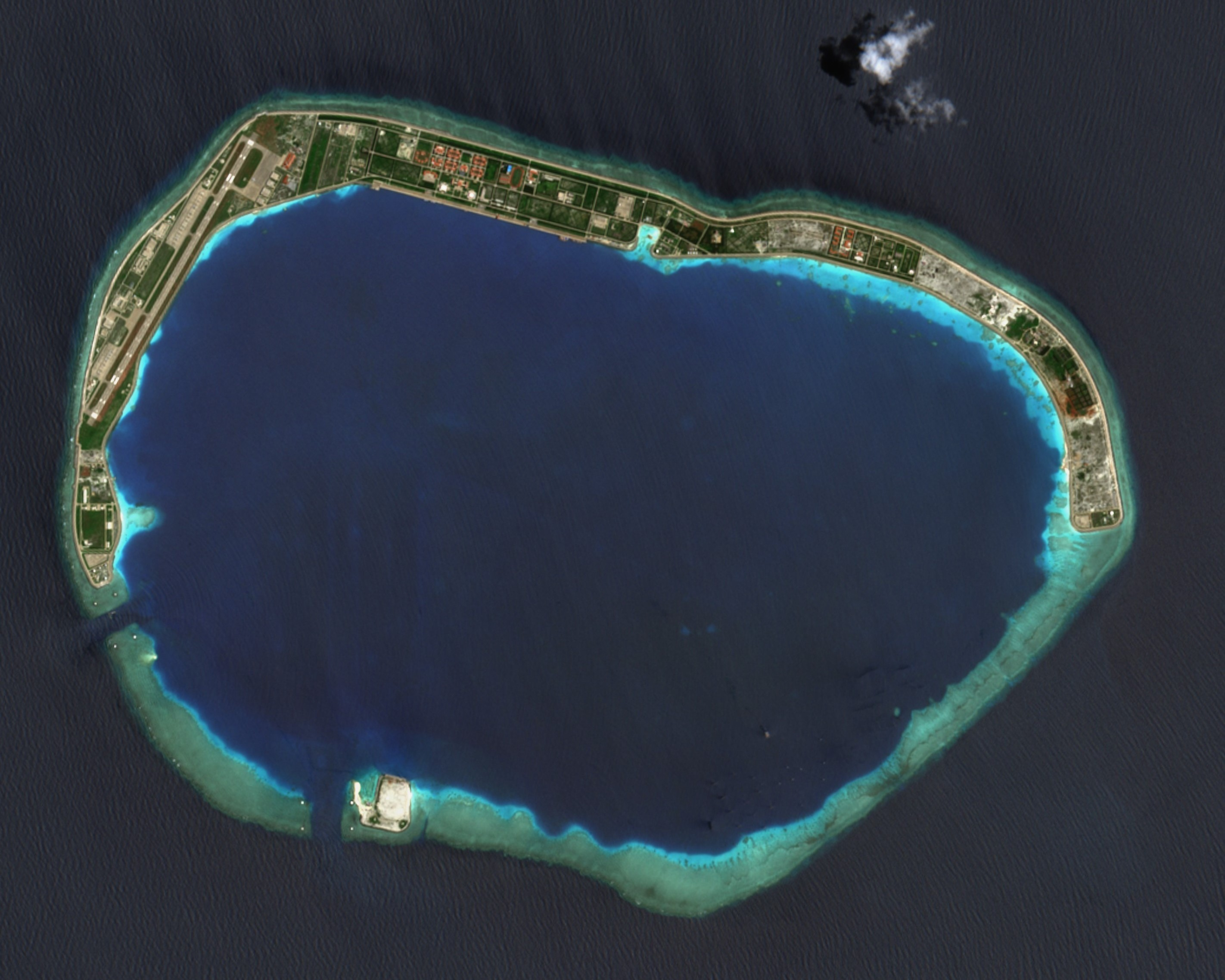
- Mischief Reef in 2022

- Location within Spratly Islands
- Other names: 美濟礁 / 美济礁 Měijì Jiāo (Chinese); Panganiban Reef (Philippine English); Bahura ng Panganiban (Filipino); Đá Vành Khăn (Vietnamese)

Geography
- Location: South China Sea
- Coordinates: 9°55′N 115°32′E
- Archipelago: Spratly Islands
- Area: 0 ha (0 acres) (Natural); 558 ha (1,380 acres) (Reclaimed)

Administration
- China
- Province: Hainan
- prefecture-level city: Sansha
- District: Nansha District

Claimed by
- China
- Philippines
- Taiwan
- Vietnam

Mischief Reef, also known as Meiji Reef (Chinese: 美濟礁/美济礁; pinyin: Měijì Jiāo), Panganiban Reef (Filipino: Bahura ng Panganiban), or Vành Khăn Reef (Vietnamese: Đá Vành Khăn), is a low tide elevation (LTE) reef/atoll surrounding a large lagoon in the southeastern region of Dangerous Ground in the east of the Spratly Islands in the South China Sea. It is located 239 kilometres (149 mi) west of Palawan Island of the Philippines. It is under the de facto control of the People's Republic of China (PRC) under the administration of Nansha, Sansha City, Hainan province. It is claimed by the Philippines as part of the Kalayaan Islands municipality in the province of Palawan. Activities by the PRC in the mid-2010s have created a large artificial island on the atoll including an approximately 2,700-metre (8,900 ft) runway and associated airfield.

Although the reef is well within the Philippines' exclusive economic zone (EEZ) and traditional fishing grounds, Mischief Reef has been controlled by the PRC since 1995, and is also claimed by the Republic of China (Taiwan), and Vietnam. The PRC performed various reclamation activities in at least two locations on the rim of the atoll in the period from 1995 to 2013. However, from the end of 2013 to the end of 2016 a large artificial island of 558 hectares (1,379 acres) was created around the majority of the lagoon's perimeter.

The reef was the subject of a 2016 tribunal ruling by the Permanent Court of Arbitration in The Hague, where the landmark ruling stated the nine-dash line as moot and without basis. Mischief Reef was also ruled as a low tide elevation (LTE) meaning it cannot possess a territorial 12-mile (19 km) boundary regardless of the reclamation and a military base installation by the PRC.

The area is said to be rich in as of yet unexplored oil and gas fields.

== History and etymology ==
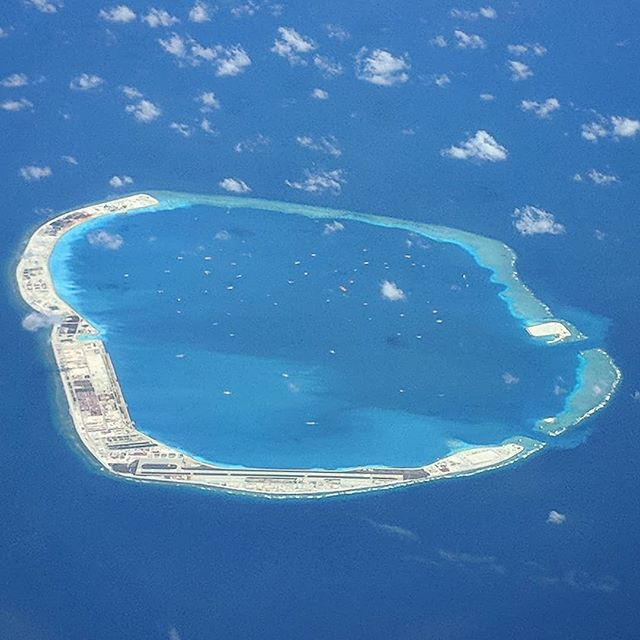
Mischief Reef in 2018, after the major PRC land reclamations of 2014–2016

One source says that Mischief Reef was discovered by Henry Spratly in 1791 and was named after the clipper Mischief that sailed regularly in the South China Sea in the 1850s.

== Location and description ==
Mischief Reef is located at 9°55′N 115°32′E. It lies 50 nautical miles (93 km; 58 mi) east of Union Banks, 239 kilometres (129 nmi) west from the Philippine Island of Palawan, within the Philippines’ exclusive economic zone under the United Nations Convention on the Law of the Sea (UNCLOS), and 1,109 kilometres (689 mi) south of China's Hainan Island.

Mischief Reef consists of a large lagoon and rocks that lie above water at low tide.

== Territorial disputes ==
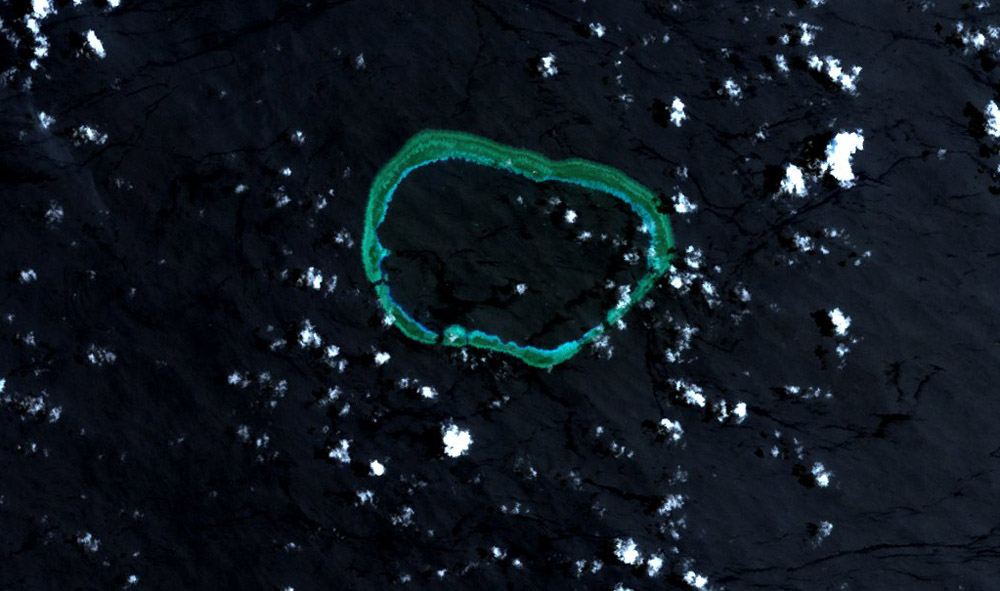
Mischief Reef in 2001, prior to the major PRC land reclamations of 2014–2016

In 1994 and 1995, China built initial structures on stilts in the area. The Philippine government protested these actions. However, the Chinese government rejected the protest and said that the structures were shelter for fishermen. In 1999, another wave of protests from Manila occurred when China added more structures to Mischief Reef.

China was also reported to have planted buoys in nearby Sabina Shoal. The Philippines claimed that China had a well-rehearsed routine when laying claim to a new reef: first put down buoys, then build concrete markers. Temporary wooden or bamboo shelters followed, and then permanent structures went up. The Philippines therefore would try to destroy the buoys or markers before China has time to build larger structures. The Philippines' decision not to destroy the Chinese structures on Mischief Reef has prevented an escalation of the dispute. The Philippines claims that China has always been prepared for armed conflict when challenged, as is evident in China's taking over reefs from Vietnam in the 1988 Johnson South Reef Skirmish which resulted in more than 70 Vietnamese deaths.

On 11 July 2012, the Chinese Type 053 frigate Dongguan ran aground on the reef, sparking embarrassment for the Chinese government and causing an awkward diplomatic situation. The ship was later towed back to base.

On 12 July 2016, the tribunal of the Permanent Court of Arbitration concluded that Mischief Reef is, or in their natural condition was, exposed at low tide and submerged at high tide and are, accordingly low-tide elevations that do not generate entitlement to a territorial sea, exclusive economic zone or continental shelf. The tribunal concluded that Mischief Reef forms part of the exclusive economic zone and continental shelf of the Philippines.

== Military development ==
In 2014, land reclamation started inside the rims. The Philippines filed a diplomatic protest against China after the discovery of their reclamation activities. By January 2016, work was well advanced on developing a military base with a large harbour and a 2,644 metres (8,675 ft) runway, with the reclaimed land covering 558 hectares (1,380 acres). A civilian test flight to the runway was conducted by a China Southern Airlines passenger jet on 13 July 2016.

In late 2016, photographs emerged which suggested that Mischief Reef was armed with anti-aircraft weapons and a CIWS missile-defence system.

In early 2021, satellite imagery and third party geointelligence analysis confirmed a radome and possible antenna mount, among other construction preparations underway on Mischief Reef.

Further military related construction and upgrades continued after the main reclamation phase. Satellite images identified new electronic warfare and intelligence, surveillance and reconnaisance (ISR) facilities, antenna arrays, hardened positions, and other structures during 2023-2025.

=== Meiji Airport ===
Meiji Airport
- IATA: none; ICAO: none

Summary
- Airport type: Military
- Owner: China
- Operator: People's Liberation Army Navy
- Location: Mischief Reef

Map
- Location of airport in the South China Sea

Runways
Direction	Length		Surface
Direction	ft	m	Surface
03/21	8,900	2,700	Concrete

== Mischief Community ==
Mischief Community (美济社区, Měijì Shèqū) is affiliated to Nansha District, Sansha City, Hainan Province, the People's Republic of China, and is located on Mischief Reef. It is the southernmost settlement by the People's Republic of China.

On December 5, 2012, the Mischief Village Committee in Nansha District, Sansha City was formally established. The 53 fishermen who guarded the reef became the first batch of villagers. The villagers' homes and village committees were located in "Qiongfuhua No. 01" in the lagoon. On a fishing boat.

According to reports, the Hainan Provincial People's Government had planned to build a cement platform in Sanya. Once completed, it would be transported to Mischief Reef and then fixed on the atoll through pre-embedded pile foundations to form a cement platform. The platform is planned to have hundreds of rooms with toilets, air conditioners and special bathrooms for villagers to live in. The plan ended with land reclamation of Mischief Reef.

In 2013, the Mischief Village Committee was renamed the Mischief Community Residents Committee.

In June 2015, after the People's Republic of China completed land reclamation on Mischief Reef, it built the office building of the Mischief Community Residents Committee on the artificial island and built bungalows for villagers to live in.

== See also ==
- Fiery Cross Reef
- Great Wall of Sand
- Nine-dash line
- Subi Reef
