= Great Wall of Sand =

2013–2016 Chinese land reclamation in the disputed South China Sea

The "Great Wall of Sand" is a series of land reclamation (artificial island building) projects by the People's Republic of China (PRC) in the Spratly Islands area of the South China Sea between late 2013 to late 2016.

== Background ==
The Spratly Islands are claimed by China (PRC), Taiwan (Republic of China), and Vietnam. Brunei, Malaysia, and the Philippines also claim some of the features in the island chain. About half of the world's merchant shipping passes through the South China Sea. The Strait of Malacca sees more tanker traffic than the Suez or the Panama Canal.

By the 1970s, the Philippines, Taiwan, and Vietnam had militarily occupied one or more of the islands. By 2015, the PRC had established 8 outposts, Malaysia had established 5, the Philippines 8, Taiwan one, on the largest Taiping Island, and Vietnam 48, by far the most numerous.

For decades, the Philippines and Vietnam were the most active in building artificial islands in the area, but from 2014 to 2016 China's construction activity outpaced them. By 2023, China had reclaimed around five square miles with its artificial islands, at least one of which housed military equipment.

== 2013–2016 ==
In late 2013, the PRC embarked on a very large scale reclamation at seven locations in order to strengthen territorial claims to the region demarcated by the nine-dash line.

The artificial islands were created by dredging sand onto reefs which were then concreted to make permanent structures. By the time of the 2015 Shangri-La Dialogue, over 810 hectares (2,000 acres) of new land had been created. By December 2016 it had reached 1,300 hectares (3,200 acres) and "'significant' weapons systems, including anti-aircraft and anti-missile systems" had been installed. The name "Great Wall of Sand" was first used in March 2015 by U.S. Admiral Harry Harris, who was commander of the Pacific Fleet.

The PRC states that the construction is for "improving the working and living conditions of people stationed on these islands", and that, "China is aiming to provide shelter, aid in navigation, weather forecasts and fishery assistance to ships of various countries passing through the sea."

Defence analysts IHS Jane's states that it is a "methodical, well planned campaign to create a chain of air and sea-capable fortresses". These "military-ready" installations include sea-walls and deep-water ports, barracks and notably include runways on three of the reclaimed "islands", including Fiery Cross Reef, Mischief Reef and Subi Reef. Aside from geo-political tensions, concerns have been raised about the environmental impact on fragile reef ecosystems through the destruction of habitat, pollution and interruption of migration routes.

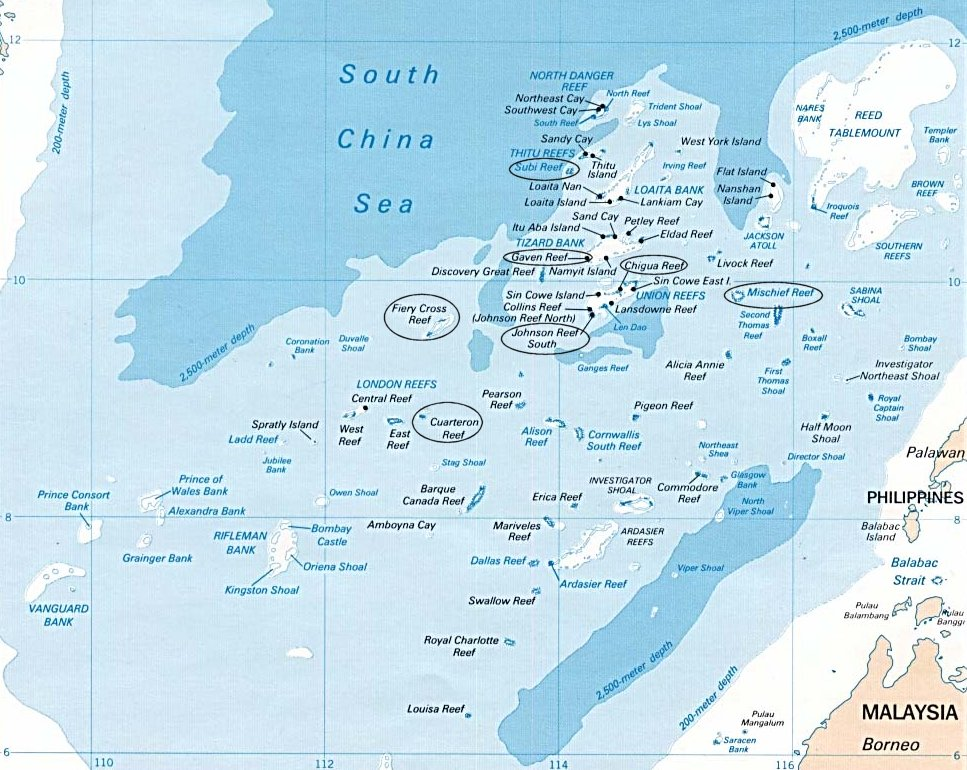
Map showing the seven sites of PRC land reclamation

The Asia Maritime Transparency Initiative's "Island tracker" has listed the following locations as the sites of the PRC island reclamation activities:

Name				Facilities added	Reclaimed area		Ref.
English	Chinese	Philippine English	Vietnamese	Facilities added	acres	ha	Ref.
Cuarteron Reef	Huáyáng Jiāo (华阳礁; Hua-yang Chiao)	Calderon Reef	Đá Châu Viên	Access channel, breakwaters, multiple support buildings, new helipad, possible radar facility	56	23	
Fiery Cross Reef	Yǒngshǔ Jiāo (永暑礁; Yung-shu Chiao)	Kagitingan Reef	Đá Chữ Thập	Airstrip (~3000m), harbor, multiple cement plants, multiple support buildings, piers	677	274	
Gaven Reefs	Nánxūn Jiāo (南薰礁; Nan-hsün Chiao)	Burgos Reefs	Đá Ga Ven	Access channel, anti-aircraft guns, communications equipment, construction support structure, defensive tower, naval guns	34	14	
Hughes Reef	Dōngmén Jiāo (东门礁; Tung-men Chiao)	—	Đá Tư Nghĩa	Access channel, coastal fortifications, four defensive towers, harbor, multi-level military facility	19	8	
Johnson South Reef	Chìguā Jiāo (赤瓜礁; Chih-kua Chiao)	Mabini Reef	Đá Gạc Ma	Access channel, concrete plant, defensive towers, desalination pumps, fuel dump, multi-level military facility, possible radar facility	27	11	
Mischief Reef	Měijì Jiāo (美济礁; Mei-chi Chiao)	Panganiban Reef	Đá Vành Khăn	Airstrip (~3000m), access channel, fortified seawalls	1,379	558	
Subi Reef	Zhǔbì Jiāo (渚碧礁; Chu-pi Chiao)	Zamora Reef	Đá Xu Bi	Airstrip (~3000m), access channel, piers	976	395	

External media

Audio
- What’s behind Beijing’s drive to control the South China Sea? (text) by Howard W. French in The Guardian, July 2015

Video
- Is China building on disputed Spratly Islands reefs? BBC News (2014)
- Confronting China: US Navy Flies Over Disputed Islands in South China Sea AiirSource Military Videos (2015)
- Why China is building islands in the South China Sea Vox (2017)

== Machinery used ==
The PRC used hundreds of dredges and barges including a giant self-propelled dredger, the MV Tian Kun Hao. Built in 2009 in China, the Tian Jing Hao is a 127 m (417 ft) long seagoing cutter suction dredger designed by German engineering company Vosta LMG. (Lübecker Maschinenbau Gesellschaft (de)). At 6,017 gross tons, with a dredging capacity of 4500 m^{3}/h (160,000 cu ft/h, it is credited as being the largest of its type in Asia. It has been operating on Cuarteron Reef, the Gaven Reefs, and at Fiery Cross Reef.

== Legal issues ==
=== Territorial waters of an artificial island ===
Territorial claims in the South China Sea

As the Mischief and Subi Reefs were under water prior to reclamations, they are considered by the Third United Nations Conference on the Law of the Sea (UNCLOS III) as "sea bed" in "international waters". Although the PRC had ratified a limited UNCLOS III not allowing innocent passage of war ships, according to the UNCLOS III, features built on the sea bed cannot have territorial waters.

==== 2016 Permanent Court of Arbitration ruling on the construction of artificial islands outside a state's Exclusive Economic Zone (EEZ) ====
UNCLOS contains the following provision:

Article 60(1) - In the exclusive economic zone, the coastal State shall have the exclusive right to construct and to authorize and regulate the construction, operation and use of: (a) artificial islands

If China's artificial islands fall within their EEZ then they would be within their rights to construct them (although this would still be subject to the environmental provisions of UNCLOS).

In 2016, the Permanent Court of Arbitration reached a decision in the dispute between the Philippines and China, resolving the question of whether China's artificial islands in the Spratly archipelago fell within its own EEZ. It held China's EEZ did not extend to the Spratly chain. Therefore, China lacked the authority to construct an artificial island in that region, and China subsequently infringed on the Philippines’ EEZ by constructing and maintaining an artificial island on Mischief Reef. This violated the Philippines’ “exclusive right to construct and to authorize and regulate the construction, operation and use of… artificial islands” as stated in Article 60(1)(a) of UNCLOS.

China disputed the outcome of the PCA's decision, labelling it “null and void”. China had argued that Taiping Island, which falls within its EEZ, should be classified as an ‘island’ under international law. This would have allowed China's EEZ to be extended another 200 nm from Taiping Island, as ‘islands’ are given the same status as mainland territory under UNCLOS. However, as Taiping Island was “incapable of self-sufficiently providing for a stable community of inhabitants, it fell under UNCLOS as a ‘rock’ rather than a naturally occurring island.” This only gave China a 12nm territorial sea surrounding Taiping Island and meant they could not extend their EEZ to the Spratly archipelago. Moreover, the mere creation of artificial islands is not enough to create an EEZ for which these islands can then fall within – as outlined in Article 60(8) of UNCLOS.

=== Environmental legal issues ===
The PRC has ratified UNCLOS III; the convention establishes general obligations for safeguarding the marine environment and protecting freedom of scientific research on the high seas, and also creates an innovative legal regime for controlling mineral resource exploitation in deep seabed areas beyond national jurisdiction, through an International Seabed Authority and the common heritage of mankind principle.

UNCLOS contains the following environmental commitments:

- Article 192 - "States have the obligation to protect and preserve the marine environment"
- Article 194(2) - "States shall take all measures necessary to ensure that activities under their jurisdiction or control are so conducted as not to cause damage by pollution to other States and their environment"
- Article 194(5) – "The measures taken in accordance with this Part shall include those necessary to protect and preserve rare or fragile ecosystems as well as the habitat of depleted, threatened or endangered species and other forms of marine life"

In addition to UNCLOS, China is a party to the Convention on Biological Diversity, which contains the following provision:

- Article 3 - "States have ... the responsibility to ensure that activities within their jurisdiction or control do not cause damage to the environment of other States or of areas beyond the limits of national jurisdiction"

China's land reclamation efforts and creation of channels for ships has destroyed portions of reefs, killing coral and other organisms in the process. In the process of island building the sediment deposited on the reefs "can wash back into the sea, forming plumes that can smother marine life and could be laced with heavy metals, oil and other chemicals from the ships and shore facilities being built." These plumes damage coral tissue and can block sunlight from organisms such as reef-building corals which are dependent on that sunlight to survive.

In the Spratly archipelago, China engaged in shallow-water dredging, removing "not only sand and gravel, but also the ecosystems of the lagoon and the reef flat, important parts of a reef." The damaged reefs that Chinese dredgers gathered sand and gravel from "may not fully recover for up to 10 to 15 years." The reefs where the dredged up sand and gravel gets placed on suffer obvious harm as coral can no longer grow on them with an artificial island now placed over the reef. Additionally, by placing artificial islands on top of reefs, fisheries are also harmed, as these reefs help replenish depleted fish stocks in the South China Sea's coastal areas.

The negative marine impact from China's artificial island building violates Articles 192 and 194(5) of UNCLOS. It also violates Article 194(2) of UNCLOS and Article 3 of the Convention on Biological Diversity as the artificial island creation has occurred outside of China's EEZ and within that of other states. Therefore, the damage is to other states and their environment (per Article 194(2) of UNCLOS), and at the very least the damage is in an area beyond the limits of national jurisdiction (per Article 3 of the Convention on Biological Diversity).

== Regional concept ==
According to Chinese sources, the concept was invented in 1972 by Vietnam's Bureau of Survey and Cartography of Vietnam under the Office of Premier Phạm Văn Đồng, which printed out "The World Atlas" and said, "The chain of islands from the Nansha and Xisha Islands to Hainan Island, Taiwan Island, the Penghu Islands and the Zhoushan Islands are shaped like a bow and constitute a Great Wall defending the China mainland."

== Reactions ==
=== States ===
- Australia – Opposed to "any coercive or unilateral actions to change the status quo in the South and East China Sea", Australia continues to fly routine surveillance operations and exercise the right to freedom of navigation in international airspace "in accordance with the international civil aviation convention, and the United Nations Convention on the Law of the Sea." Amid rising Australia-China diplomatic tensions in 2020, Australia strengthened its opposition by making a submission to the United Nations declaring the works are "completely unlawful" – following its ally the United States' position.
- China – Following confrontations between US P8-A Poseidon aircraft and the Chinese Navy over the constructions in May 2015, China stated that it has "the right to engage in monitoring in the relevant air space and waters to protect the country's sovereignty and prevent accidents at sea."
- South Korea – No official stance, maintains an "increasingly notable silence on freedom of navigation in the South China Sea".
- United States – The construction is considered to be a key motivating factor behind the Obama administration's "Asia Pivot" military strategy. It believes "that China's activities in the South China Sea are driven by nationalism, part of a wider strategy aimed at undercutting US influence in Asia." It has declared that it would operate military aircraft in the region "'in accordance with international law in disputed areas of the South China Sea' and would continue to do so 'consistent with the rights freedoms and lawful uses of the sea.'"

Since October 2015, when the USS DDG-82 passed close to man-made land built upon Subi Reef, the US has been conducting freedom of navigation operations (FONOP) near the artificial islands approximately every three months using Arleigh Burke-class guided missile destroyers.
In 2020 amid rising diplomatic and economic tensions in US-China relations, America declared that, "Beijing's claims to offshore resources across most of the South China Sea are completely unlawful, as is its campaign of bullying to control them."

=== Organizations ===
- ASEAN – The Association of Southeast Asian Nations stated that the constructions "may undermine peace, security and stability" in the region as well as having strongly negative impact on the marine environment and fishery stocks.
- G7 – In a "Declaration on maritime security" before the 41st G7 summit, the G7 stated that, "We continue to observe the situation in the East and South China Seas and are concerned by any unilateral actions, such as large scale land reclamation, which change the status quo and increase tensions. We strongly oppose any attempt to assert territorial or maritime claims through the use of intimidation, coercion or force.
- In July 2016, the Permanent Court of Arbitration in The Hague issued a decision stating that China has no historic title over the area.

== Ecological impact ==
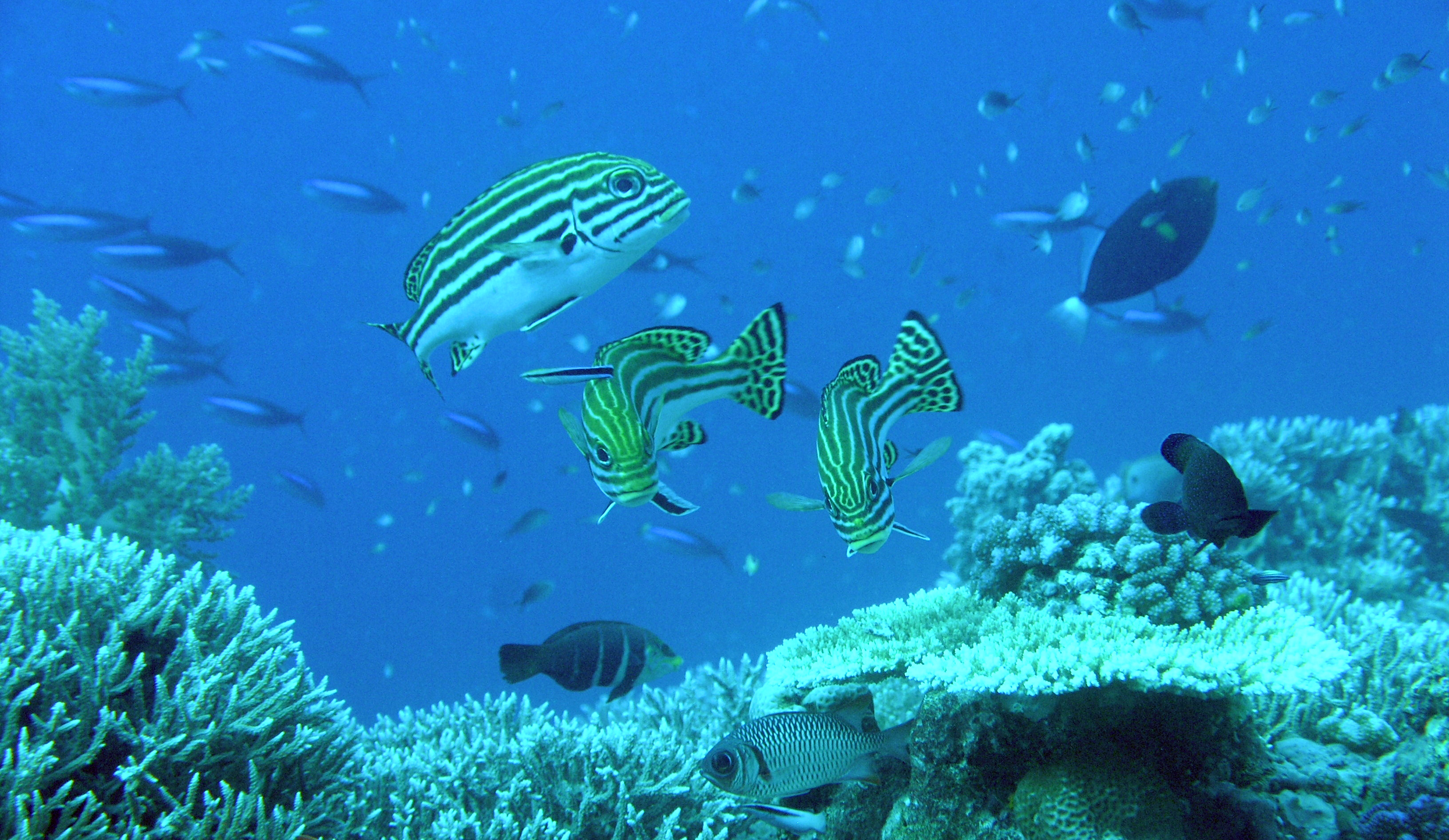
Swallow Reef in the Spratly Islands

Aside from geo-political tensions, concerns have been raised about the environmental impact on fragile reef ecosystems through the destruction of habitat, pollution and interruption of migration routes. These new islands are built on reefs previously one metre (3 ft) below the level of the sea. For back-filling these seven artificial islands, a total area of 13.5 square kilometres (5.2 sq mi), to the height of few meters, China had to destroy surrounding reefs and pump 40 to 50 million m^{3} (1.4 to 1.8 billion cu ft) of sand and corals, resulting in significant and irreversible damage to the environment. Frank Muller-Karger, professor of biological oceanography at the University of South Florida, said sediment "can wash back into the sea, forming plumes that can smother marine life and could be laced with heavy metals, oil and other chemicals from the ships and shore facilities being built." Such plumes threaten the biologically diverse reefs throughout the Spratlys, which Dr. Muller-Karger said may have trouble surviving in sediment-laden water.

Rupert Wingfield-Hayes, visiting the vicinity of the Philippine-controlled island of Pagasa by plane and boat, said he saw Chinese fishermen poaching and destroying the reefs on a massive scale. As he saw Chinese fishermen poaching endangered species like massive giant clams, he noted "None of this proves China is protecting the poachers. But nor does Beijing appear to be doing anything to stop them. The poachers we saw showed absolutely no sign of fear when they saw our cameras filming them". He concludes: "However shocking the reef plundering I witnessed, it is as nothing compared to the environmental destruction wrought by China's massive island building programme nearby. The latest island China has just completed at Mischief Reef is more than 9km (six miles) long. That is 9km of living reef that is now buried under millions of tonnes of sand and gravel."

A 2014 United Nations Environment Programme (UNEP) report noted that "Sand is rarer than one thinks." "The average price of sand imported by Singapore was US$3 per tonne from 1995 to 2001, but the price increased to US$190 per tonne from 2003 to 2005". Although the Philippines and the PRC had both ratified the UNCLOS III, in the case of Johnson South Reef, Hughes Reef and Mischief Reef, the PRC dredged sand for free in the EEZ the Philippines had claimed from 1978, arguing this to be the "waters of China's Nansha Islands". "Although the consequences of substrate mining are hidden, they are tremendous. Aggregate particles that are too fine to be used are rejected by dredging boats, releasing vast dust plumes and changing water turbidity".

John McManus, a professor of marine biology and ecology at the University of Miami said: "The worst thing anyone can do to a coral reef is to bury it under tons of sand and gravel ... There are global security concerns associated with the damage. It is likely broad enough to reduce fish stocks in the world's most fish-dependent region." He explained that the reason "the world has heard little about the damage inflicted by the People's Republic of China to the reefs is that the experts can't get to them", and noted "I have colleagues from the Philippines, Taiwan, PRC, Vietnam and Malaysia who have worked in the Spratly area. Most would not be able to get near the artificial islands except possibly some from PRC, and those would not be able to release their findings".

== See also ==
- Foreign policy of China
- Great Wall of China
- Great Firewall
- Nine-dash line
- Great Green Wall of China
