= Sansha =

Prefecture-level city in Hainan, China

Sansha 三沙市
- Prefecture-level city
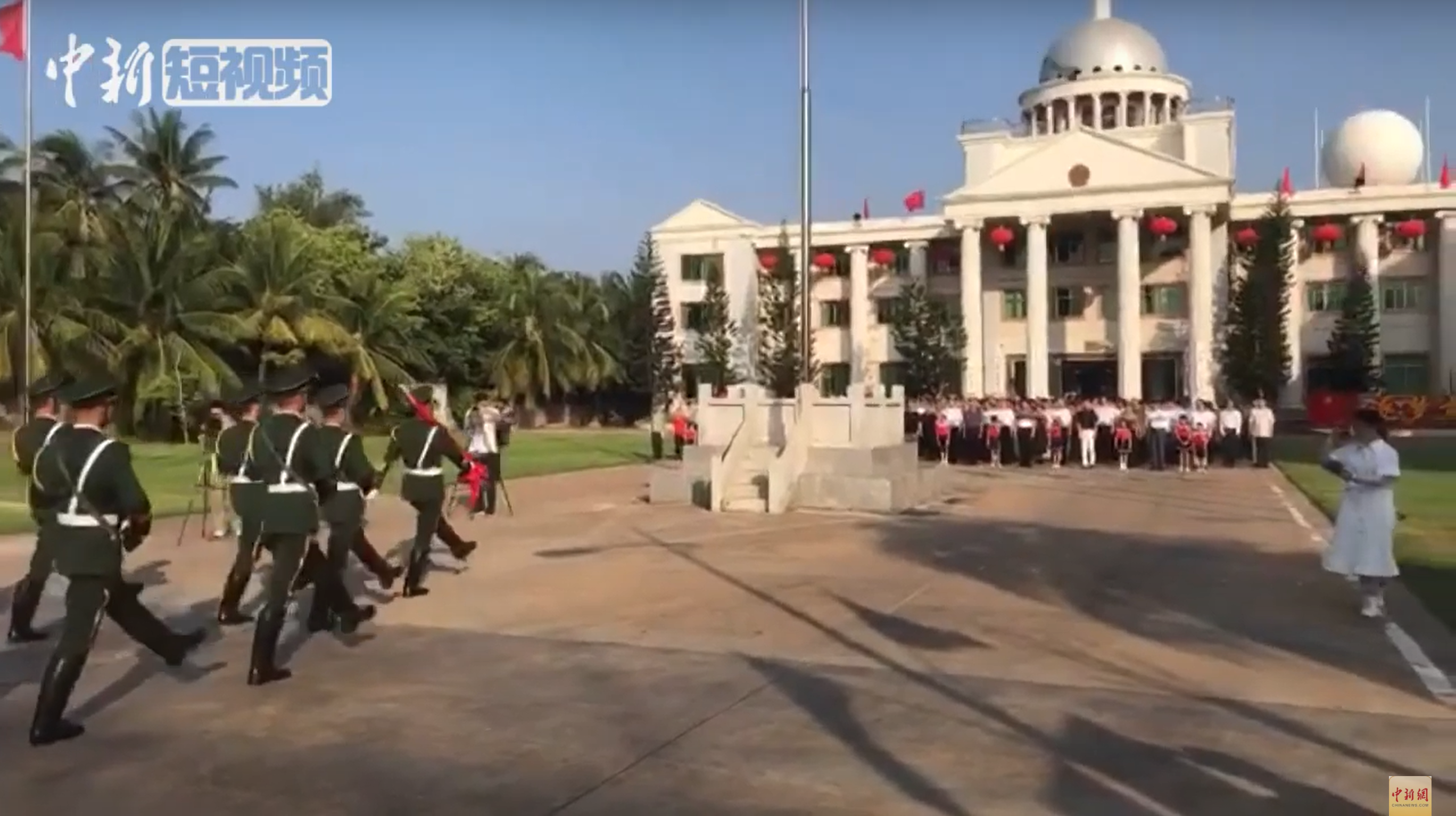
- City Hall of Sansha

- Location within South China Sea
- Coordinates (Sansha municipal government): 16°49′52″N 112°20′19″E
- Country: People's Republic of China
- Province: Hainan
- Prefecture-level city established: 24 July 2012
- City seat: Yongxing Island (Woody Island)

Government
  - CCP Secretary: Yuan Guangping (袁光平)
  - Congress Chairperson: Wang Changren (王长仁)
  - Mayor: Deng Zhong (邓忠)

Area approx.
  - Land: 13 km^{2} (5.0 sq mi)
  - Water: 2,000,000 km^{2} (770,000 sq mi)

Population (2013)
  - Total: 1,443
- Time zone: UTC+08:00 (China Standard Time)
- Postal code: 573100
- Website: www.sansha.gov.cn
- Territorial Dispute: There are on-going territorial disputes in the entire area covered by the city, whose administrative authority is not internationally recognized.

Sansha
- "Sansha", as written in Chinese
- Chinese: 三沙
- Hanyu Pinyin: Sānshā
- Postal: Samsha
- Literal meaning: three sands (referring to the Chinese names for the three island groups)
Transcriptions
Standard Mandarin
- Hanyu Pinyin: Sānshā
Wu
- Romanization: sae^{1}so^{1}
Xiang
- IPA: siã^{44} so^{44}
Yue: Cantonese
- Yale Romanization: Sāamsā
- Jyutping: saam^{1}saa^{1}
Southern Min
- Hokkien POJ: sam-sua

Sansha City (Chinese: 三沙市; pinyin: Sānshā Shì) is a prefecture-level city under the Hainan province of China. It is the southernmost and least populated prefecture in China by far, with the smallest land area but the largest maritime territory. (Note: Taipei, on the island of Taiwan, is the smallest prefectural city by land area claimed by the PRC, but Taipei is administered by the Republic of China (ROC) as its special municipality.) The city's seat is located on Yongxing Island in the South China Sea, and administers (actually or nominally) several island groups, atolls, seamounts and a number of other ungrouped maritime features within the nine-dash line, although the PRC's de facto control over the area varies. The name "Sansha", literally meaning "three sands", refers to the three archipelago districts of Xisha (Chinese: 西沙; lit. 'west sand'), Zhongsha (Chinese: 中沙; lit. 'central sand') and Nansha (Chinese: 南沙; lit. 'south sand').

Sansha was created on 24 July 2012, and administers a group of 260 islands, reefs and beaches located in the Spratly Islands (Nansha), Paracel Islands (Xisha), and Macclesfield Bank (Zhongsha Islands). Reports in the China Daily stated that the establishment of Sansha was simply an upgrade of its administrative status from the previous county-level administration to prefecture-level. Subsequent developments have turned Sansha City (located on Xisha District's Yongxing Island) into a small town with over 1,400 residents, with a dual-use airport that has a 2,700 metres (3,000 yd) runway and two artificial harbors capable of docking sea vessels up to 5,000 tonnes.

Due to territorial disputes in the South China Sea, foreign reaction to the city's establishment was not positive. The United States Department of State called the change in the administrative status "unilateral", and the move has received criticism from nations engaged in the South China Sea dispute, particularly the Philippines as well as Vietnam and the Republic of China (ROC, Taiwan), with the latter two claiming the island.

== Recent history ==
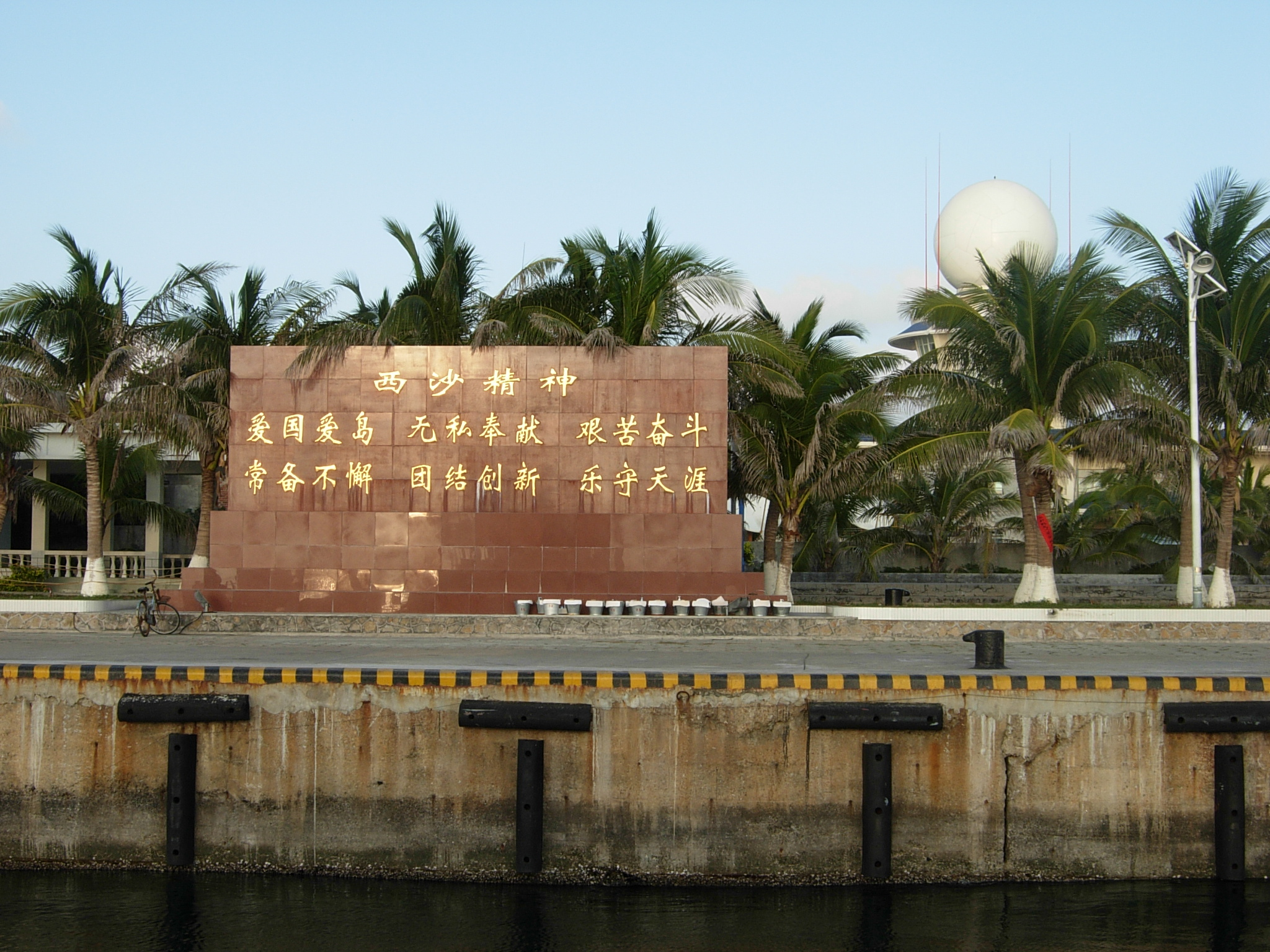
Yongxing Town on Woody Island

In March 1953, as talks were proceeding with the French on the handing over of Hainan and territories south of Guangdong to the People's Republic of China, the Chinese State Council authorized the establishment of a separate "Guangdong Province Paracels, Spratlys, and Zhongsha Islands Authority" as a county-level administrative division on Woody Island (Yongxing Dao). However, the island continued to support a threadbare population of fisherfolk at that time. In March 1959, this authority was upgraded to an administrative office in the name of "Guangdong Province Paracels, Spratlys, and Zhongsha Islands Revolutionary Committee". In October 1984, the administration of Sansha consisting of Yongxing Dao (Woody Island) and other islands in the South China sea was transferred to Hainan. This coincided with the establishment of Hainan as a separate administrative region. In September 1988, the authority's name was officially changed to the "Hainan Province Paracels, Spratlys, and Zhongsha Islands Authority". On 25 December 2006, Woody Island 'census-town's' first-ever "Residents' and Fishermen's Congress" was held. Three representatives at the township and village levels were selected to represent the census-town's Neighborhood Committee of the North and South Villages. The Neighborhood Committee began work on Woody Island the following day with an office at the Border Guards of the Paracels' Police Station. These were the first ever actual subdivisions created within the county-level authority.

The prospect of the establishment of a "city" on Woody Island was first publicized on 19 November 2007 in a report by Mingpao, a Hong Kong-based newspaper, through a telephone interview with a Mr. Zhang of the Propaganda Department of Wenchang, Hainan. This report claimed that a county-level city was to be established by the PRC State Council in November 2007 to administer three disputed archipelagos in the South China Sea: the Paracel Islands, Macclesfield Bank (Zhongsha Islands) and the Spratly Islands. This was to replace the county-level "Paracels, Spratlys, and Zhongsha Islands Authority". The city of Wenchang would provide supplies and logistics to the to-be-established city.

On 23 July 2012, the PRC Central Military Commission announced it had authorized the People's Liberation Army Guangzhou Military Command to form a "garrison command" in Sansha City. The troops would be responsible for managing the city's national defence mobilisation, military reserve, and carrying out military operations.

On 24 July 2012, the PRC officially established the city of Sansha in Yongxing Island.

By January 2016, work was well advanced on developing a military base with a large harbour and a 2,644 metres (8,675 ft) runway, with the reclaimed land covering 558 hectares (1,380 acres). A civilian test flight to the runway was conducted by a China Southern Airlines passenger jet on 13 July 2016. On 16 February 2016, the New York Times reported that China had deployed HQ‑9 surface‑to‑air missiles on the island.

In late 2016, photographs emerged which suggested that Mischief Reef was armed with anti-aircraft weapons and a CIWS missile-defence system. In May 2018, the Centre for Strategic and International Studies, a US think tank, said satellite images showed China had deployed new military weapon platforms to Woody Island, the largest of the Paracels.

In July 2026, China deployed the Sansha Zhifa 301, a Zhaohan-class law-enforcement patrol vessel operated by Sansha City, to a newly reclaimed artificial island in the South China Sea. It is the first known deployment of a Chinese government law-enforcement vessel to the island since land reclamation began.

== Administrative divisions ==
Sansha City has two districts, Xisha District and Nansha District. Xisha District administers the Xisha and Zhongsha Islands and their surrounding waters, with the district government located on Yongxing Town. Nansha District administers the Nansha Islands and their surrounding waters, with the district government located on Yongshu Jiao.

Sansha is governed by a municipal congress of 60 delegates directly elected, with a standing committee of 15 members. It is further subdivided into 2 districts at county-level, 3 towns/management committees at the township-level, and further into 11 residential communities at village-level, based on the island groups:

Division code County-level divisions	Township-level divisions	Village-level divisions	Location of the major claimed islands in the Sansha administrative area of China. Legend：: Black：α – Yongxing Island (Woody Island) (seat of Sansha); Red：β – Chigua Reef (Johnson South Reef); Green：γ – Dongmen Reef (Hughes Reef); Yellow：δ – Huangyan Island (Scarborough Shoal); Red：ε – Huayang Reef (Cuarteron Reef); Blue：ζ – Meiji Reef (Mischief Reef); Blue：η – Nanxun Reef (Gaven Reefs); Black：θ – Zhongjian Island (Triton Island); Green：κ – Yongshu Reef (Fiery Cross Reef); Purple：λ – Zhubi Reef (Subi Reef)
460302; Xisha District 西沙区; Xīshā Qū; District seat: Yongxing town MA	Yongxing Town Management Area 永兴镇管理区; Yǒngxìng Zhèn Guǎnlǐqū	Yongxing Residential Community 永兴社区 Yǒngxìng Shèqū	
460302; Xisha District 西沙区; Xīshā Qū; District seat: Yongxing town MA	Yongxing Town Management Area 永兴镇管理区; Yǒngxìng Zhèn Guǎnlǐqū	Yingqu Residential Community 营区社区 Yíngqū Shèqū	
460302; Xisha District 西沙区; Xīshā Qū; District seat: Yongxing town MA	Qilianyu Management Area 七连屿管理区; Qīliányǔ Guǎnlǐqū	Beidao Residential Community 北岛社区 Běidǎo Shèqū	
460302; Xisha District 西沙区; Xīshā Qū; District seat: Yongxing town MA	Qilianyu Management Area 七连屿管理区; Qīliányǔ Guǎnlǐqū	Zhaoshu Residential Community 赵述社区 Zhàoshù Shèqū	
460302; Xisha District 西沙区; Xīshā Qū; District seat: Yongxing town MA	Yonglequndao Management Area 永乐群岛管理区; Yǒnglè Qúndǎo Guǎnlǐqū	Jinqing Residential Community 晋卿社区 Jìnqīng Shèqū	
460302; Xisha District 西沙区; Xīshā Qū; District seat: Yongxing town MA	Yonglequndao Management Area 永乐群岛管理区; Yǒnglè Qúndǎo Guǎnlǐqū	Yinyu Residential Community 银屿社区 Yínyǔ Shèqū	
460302; Xisha District 西沙区; Xīshā Qū; District seat: Yongxing town MA	Yonglequndao Management Area 永乐群岛管理区; Yǒnglè Qúndǎo Guǎnlǐqū	Lingyang Residential Community 羚羊社区 Língyáng Shèqū	
460302; Xisha District 西沙区; Xīshā Qū; District seat: Yongxing town MA	Yonglequndao Management Area 永乐群岛管理区; Yǒnglè Qúndǎo Guǎnlǐqū	Ganquan Residential Community 甘泉社区 Gānquán Shèqū	
460302; Xisha District 西沙区; Xīshā Qū; District seat: Yongxing town MA	Yonglequndao Management Area 永乐群岛管理区; Yǒnglè Qúndǎo Guǎnlǐqū	Yagong Residential Community 鸭公社区 Yāgōng Shèqū	
(under Xisha)	Zhongsha Islands 中沙群岛的岛礁及其海域; Zhōngshā Qúndǎo De Dǎojiāo Jíqí Hǎiyù; District seat: Huangyan	(under Xisha) Huangyan 黄岩 Huángyán	
(under Xisha)	Zhongsha Islands 中沙群岛的岛礁及其海域; Zhōngshā Qúndǎo De Dǎojiāo Jíqí Hǎiyù; District seat: Huangyan	(under Xisha) Zhongsha Bank 中沙大环礁 Zhōngshā Dàhuán Jiāo	
460303; Nansha District 南沙区; Nánshā Qū; District seat: Nansha MA	Nansha Management Area 南沙管理区; Nánshā Guǎnlǐqū	Yongshu Residential Community 永暑社区 Yǒngshǔ Shèqū	
460303; Nansha District 南沙区; Nánshā Qū; District seat: Nansha MA	Nansha Management Area 南沙管理区; Nánshā Guǎnlǐqū	(under Yongshu) Meiji 美济 Měijì	
460303; Nansha District 南沙区; Nánshā Qū; District seat: Nansha MA	Nansha Management Area 南沙管理区; Nánshā Guǎnlǐqū	(under Yongshu) Zhubi 渚碧 Zhǔbì	
460303; Nansha District 南沙区; Nánshā Qū; District seat: Nansha MA	Nansha Management Area 南沙管理区; Nánshā Guǎnlǐqū	(under Yongshu) Huangyang 华阳 Huángyáng	
460303; Nansha District 南沙区; Nánshā Qū; District seat: Nansha MA	Nansha Management Area 南沙管理区; Nánshā Guǎnlǐqū	(under Yongshu) Chigua 赤瓜 Chìguā	
460303; Nansha District 南沙区; Nánshā Qū; District seat: Nansha MA	Nansha Management Area 南沙管理区; Nánshā Guǎnlǐqū	(under Yongshu) Nanxun 南薰 Nánxūn	
460303; Nansha District 南沙区; Nánshā Qū; District seat: Nansha MA	Nansha Management Area 南沙管理区; Nánshā Guǎnlǐqū	(under Yongshu) Dongmen 东门 Dōngmén	

== Climate ==
Climate data for Sansha (Xisha District), elevation 5 m (16 ft), (1991–2020 normals)
Month	Jan	Feb	Mar	Apr	May	Jun	Jul	Aug	Sep	Oct	Nov	Dec	Year
Mean daily maximum °C (°F)	26.4 (79.5)	27.1 (80.8)	29.0 (84.2)	30.7 (87.3)	31.7 (89.1)	31.8 (89.2)	31.4 (88.5)	31.3 (88.3)	31.0 (87.8)	30.0 (86.0)	28.6 (83.5)	26.9 (80.4)	29.7 (85.4)
Daily mean °C (°F)	23.8 (74.8)	24.3 (75.7)	26.1 (79.0)	28.0 (82.4)	29.3 (84.7)	29.7 (85.5)	29.3 (84.7)	29.1 (84.4)	28.6 (83.5)	27.6 (81.7)	26.5 (79.7)	24.8 (76.6)	27.3 (81.1)
Mean daily minimum °C (°F)	22.3 (72.1)	22.6 (72.7)	24.3 (75.7)	26.1 (79.0)	27.5 (81.5)	28.1 (82.6)	27.6 (81.7)	27.4 (81.3)	26.6 (79.9)	25.6 (78.1)	25.0 (77.0)	23.4 (74.1)	25.5 (78.0)
Average precipitation mm (inches)	18.3 (0.72)	9.4 (0.37)	17.2 (0.68)	67.7 (2.67)	109.4 (4.31)	102.9 (4.05)	205.1 (8.07)	205.5 (8.09)	251.0 (9.88)	263.0 (10.35)	126.2 (4.97)	69.3 (2.73)	1,445 (56.89)
Average precipitation days (≥ 0.1 mm)	7.8	4.6	3.5	4.7	8.0	9.1	10.3	12.1	15.1	17.0	13.8	13.8	119.8
Average relative humidity (%)	78	80	79	79	80	81	82	82	82	80	80	79	80
Mean monthly sunshine hours	198.3	210.1	260.2	269.9	277.6	256.6	251.0	238.3	210.8	207.3	175.1	149.0	2,704.2
Percentage possible sunshine	57	64	70	72	69	65	63	61	58	57	52	43	61
Source: China Meteorological Administration

Climate data for Sansha (Pattle Island), elevation 4 m (13 ft), (1991–2020 normals)
Month	Jan	Feb	Mar	Apr	May	Jun	Jul	Aug	Sep	Oct	Nov	Dec	Year
Mean daily maximum °C (°F)	26.8 (80.2)	27.9 (82.2)	30.0 (86.0)	31.8 (89.2)	32.9 (91.2)	33.0 (91.4)	32.5 (90.5)	32.1 (89.8)	31.5 (88.7)	30.3 (86.5)	28.8 (83.8)	27.1 (80.8)	30.4 (86.7)
Daily mean °C (°F)	23.9 (75.0)	24.4 (75.9)	26.2 (79.2)	28.1 (82.6)	29.5 (85.1)	29.9 (85.8)	29.3 (84.7)	29.0 (84.2)	28.3 (82.9)	27.4 (81.3)	26.3 (79.3)	24.8 (76.6)	27.3 (81.1)
Mean daily minimum °C (°F)	22.2 (72.0)	22.5 (72.5)	24.1 (75.4)	25.8 (78.4)	27.2 (81.0)	27.8 (82.0)	27.2 (81.0)	26.9 (80.4)	26.0 (78.8)	25.3 (77.5)	24.7 (76.5)	23.2 (73.8)	25.2 (77.4)
Average precipitation mm (inches)	22.7 (0.89)	9.9 (0.39)	13.2 (0.52)	60.3 (2.37)	86.8 (3.42)	91.4 (3.60)	178.1 (7.01)	195.7 (7.70)	240.6 (9.47)	236.6 (9.31)	146.9 (5.78)	86.3 (3.40)	1,368.5 (53.86)
Average precipitation days (≥ 0.1 mm)	8.7	5.3	4.1	4.8	7.6	7.3	9.1	10.1	14.3	16.3	14.3	14.5	116.4
Average relative humidity (%)	80	82	82	82	83	83	84	86	86	84	84	81	83
Source: China Meteorological Administration

== Industries and facilities ==
The Sansha city has a registered population of 621 (as per 2020) and a resident population of around 1,800, in addition to an unknown number of military garrison personnels. They tend to practice fishing, and selling products to the occasional cruise ship (MV Qionghai 3 and MV Sansha 1) whose tourists visit the island. In November 2016, the Hainan government started to allow large companies to register themselves in Sansha, by providing extensive tax benefits to them. This resulted in 157 large national and multinational companies registering themselves in Sansha.

In 2016, a government school and a public library were opened in the island, primarily for children of the islanders. In the same year, a desalinating plant was established to provide drinking water to the island's residents.

Airports are built on several islands under Sansha City, including Yongxing Island, Meiji Island, Yongshu Island and Zhubi Island, all of which have runways longer than 2,700 metres (3,000 yd) and are suitable for planes sizing up to 4E standards, theoretically capable of landing Boeing 777s as diversion airports. In practice, only the Yongxing Island Airport see scheduled commercial services, onboard Boeing 737 operated by Hainan Airlines. The other airports are for military use only.

The centre of government for Sansha is located on Woody Island (Yongxing Dao) in the Paracels, where about 1,000 Chinese (PRC) reside. With a land area of 210ha, Woody Island is the largest contiguous land area in the South China Sea. The total land area of Sansha, which includes the islands in the Paracel and Spratly groups, is less than 5 square miles (13 km^{2}). Nationally, Sansha is the smallest prefecture-level city, by both population and land area, but the largest by total area.

== Initiatives ==
=== "Greening the islands" ===
The second stage of a greening project for Sansha was announced on 30 June 2014. It states: "According to the investment plan, 18 million yuan (about 2.92 million U.S. dollars) will be used to build desalination systems and grow trees on Xishazhou Island (West Sand - NW Crescent Group) in the hope of turning the island into a new oasis." The article makes references to the greening of:

- Ganquan Island (Robert Island) - W Crescent Group between Antelope Reef and Pattle Island, where an environmental protection station was set up in February 2014
- Jinqin (Drummond Island) - E Crescent Group
- Lingyangjiao (Antelope Reef) - W Crescent Group between Money and Robert Islands
- Xishazhou Island (West Sand) - NW Crescent Group
- Yagong Island - NE Crescent Group, between Tree Island and Observation Bank
- Yinyu (Observation Bank / Silver Islet) - NE Crescent Group
- Yongxing Island (Woody Island) - Centre of Amphitrite group
- Zhaoshu (Tree Island) - N Crescent Group

It also mentions substantial infrastructure upgrades to Woody Island, including waste-water treatment, garbage aggregation and treatment, desalination (1 million litres/day) and upgrades to photovoltaic equipment.

== Controversy and protests ==
Because Sansha's jurisdiction comprises island groups that several nations besides the PRC claim as their own, the "city" is considered by some as controversial.

In 2007, the Foreign Ministry of Vietnam protested against the city's proposed establishment, which had been recently approved by the PRC's State Council, as Vietnam claims two of the three island groups that comprise Sansha. This was later followed by student demonstrations at the Chinese embassy in Hanoi, and at a consulate in Ho Chi Minh City.

Days prior to the official establishment of the city in late July 2012, Vietnam again stated its opposition and was joined in its protests by the Philippines. The United States Department of State also weighed in on the issue stating, "we remain concerned should there be any unilateral moves of this kind that would seem to prejudge an issue." The chair of the US Senate Foreign Relations East Asian and Pacific Affairs Subcommittee, Jim Webb, also made a statement regarding Sansha and questioned whether the city's creation was a violation of international law. While Senator Webb stated that the establishment of Sansha was China "creating a governmental system out of nothing", the Chinese government has included the island groups that comprise Sansha in its administrative structure since 1959. Before these island groups were under the nominal administration of Sansha, they were nominally administered by an administrative office under the provincial government of Hainan.

Western reaction to the 2012 declaration of the Chinese government elevating the administrative status of Sansha was not positive. The United States Department of State called the change in the administrative status of the territory "unilateral", and the move has received criticism from nations engaged in the South China Sea dispute, particularly the Philippines and Vietnam.

== See also ==
- Administrative divisions of the People's Republic of China
- South China Sea Islands
  - James Shoal
  - Macclesfield Bank
  - Paracel Islands
  - Scarborough Shoal
  - Spratly Islands
- Territorial disputes in the South China Sea
- Kalayaan, Palawan, Philippines
- Trường Sa, Khánh Hòa, Vietnam
