= Fiery Cross Reef =

Disputed atoll
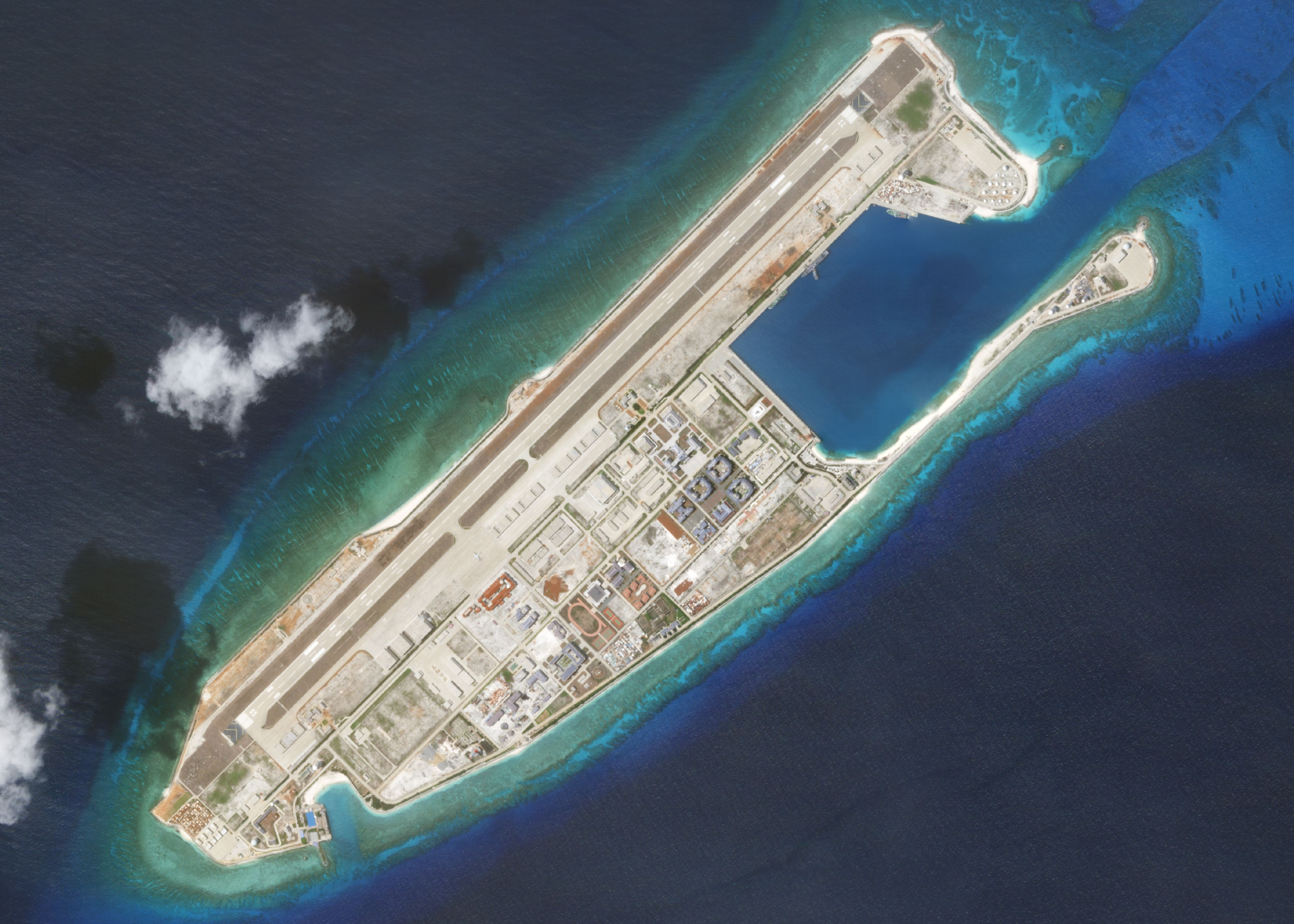
- Satellite image taken by SkySat in 2020

- Location within Spratly Islands
- Other names: Northwest; Kagitingan Reef (Philippine English); Bahura ng Kagitingan (Filipino); Đá Chữ Thập (Vietnamese)

Geography
- Location: South China Sea
- Coordinates: 9°32′57″N 112°53′21″E
- Archipelago: Spratly Islands
- Area: 0 ha (0 acres) (Natural); 274 ha (680 acres) (Reclaimed)

Administration
- China
- Province: Hainan
- Prefecture-level City: Sansha
- District: Nansha District

Claimed by
- China
- Philippines
- Taiwan
- Vietnam

Fiery Cross Reef, also known as "Northwest Investigator Reef", Mandarin Chinese: 永暑礁; pinyin: Yǒngshǔ Jiāo; Kagitingan Reef (Filipino: Bahura ng Kagitingan, lit. 'Reef of Valor'); Vietnamese: Đá Chữ Thập, is a militarized reef controlled and administered by China (PRC) as part of Sansha of Hainan Province and is also claimed by the Republic of China (ROC/Taiwan), the Philippines and Vietnam.

The atoll was named after the British tea clipper Fiery Cross, which was wrecked on the atoll on 4 March 1860. (A later sister ship was also named Fiery Cross). The atoll was surveyed by Lieutenant J. W. Reed of HMS Rifleman, who in 1867 reported it to be one extensive reef, and found the apparent wrecks of Fiery Cross and Meerschaum.

In December 1934 the 'Land and Water Maps Inspection Committee' of the government of the China copied the English name "Fiery Cross Reef" and translated it as 十字火礁 / Shizi huo jiao (literally Fire Cross Reef). This name was published on an official list of names in January 1935. In 1947, it was renamed "Yongshu Reef" (永暑礁) by the government. At that time, Chinese fishermen called it "Tuwu" (土戊).

The atoll was occupied by China (PRC) in early 1988, despite immediate opposition from Vietnam, which led to armed conflict at Johnson Reef South in March of that year. In 2014, the PRC commenced reclamation activity in the area, and it has been converted into an artificial island of 274 hectares (677 acres). There were around 200 Chinese troops on the atoll in late 2014, though this number was likely to have increased significantly in 2015 with the addition of support personnel for the new airbase, including a 3,125-meter-long (1.9 mi) runway and associated early warning radar site.

According to the Center for Strategic and International Studies, it is "the most advanced of China's bases" in the South China Sea, with 12 hardened shelters with retractable roofs for mobile missile launchers already completed. It has enough hangars to accommodate 24 combat aircraft and four larger planes Fiery Cross Reef has a runway long enough to land a Chinese Xian H-6N bomber; a bomber like this could perform combat operations within 5,600 kilometers (3,500 mi) of the reclaimed reef.

== Geographical features ==
On 12 July 2016, the tribunal of the Permanent Court of Arbitration concluded that Fiery Cross Reef contains, within the meaning of Article 121(1) of the United Nations Convention on the Law of the Sea (UNCLOS), naturally formed areas of land, surrounded by water, which are above water at low tide. However, for purposes of Article 121(3) of UNCLOS, the high-tide features at Fiery Cross Reef are "rocks that cannot sustain human habitation or economic life of their own and accordingly shall be entitled to 12 nautical miles of territorial sea measured from its baseline but have no exclusive economic zone or continental shelf".

== GLOSS sea level monitoring station ==
In March 1987, China submitted the name of 'Yongshu Jiao' to a United Nations Educational, Scientific and Cultural Organization/Intergovernmental Oceanographic Commission (UNESCO/IOC) meeting as a possible location for a monitoring station as part of the Global Sea Level Observing System (GLOSS) survey. The scientists, unaware of the location of 'Yongshu Jiao' included the feature on a list of sites for tide gauges on what the PRC considered to be its coasts in the East China Sea and on the "Nansha islands" in South China Sea. The scientists were unaware of regional political disputes, including Taiwanese territorial claims to, and occupation of, one of the Spratly Islands.

In April 1987, the PRC chose Fiery Cross Reef as the site to build a weather station, as the reef was large enough for the purpose, and it was isolated from other disputed islands and reefs. However, this caused further skirmishes with Vietnam when, in January 1988, some Vietnamese ships with construction materials tried to approach the reef in a bid to establish structures there.

Construction was commenced in February 1988 and completed in August 1988.

== Land reclamation ==
During 2014, the PRC government began land reclamation activities to construct a large artificial island to support an approximately 3,300 meters (10,800 ft) airstrip, a seaport and a military base.

Although the PRC has a 3,000-meter (9,800 ft) runway on Woody Island in the Paracels, it had been at a disadvantage compared with other claimants of areas of the South China Sea as it was the only claimant that did not have an airfield in the Spratly Islands. As of January 2016, the PRC has reclaimed land on seven reefs and built three runways within the Spratly Islands. The runway on Fiery Cross was completed in January 2016 and is the southernmost of the three (the others being at Mischief and Subi reefs). The PRC test-landed two civilian aircraft there in January 2016, one from China Southern Airlines and the other from Hainan Airlines.

The People's Liberation Army Daily reported that a Chinese military jet had made a public landing there in April 2016. It has been asserted that other PRC military aircraft, including jet fighters, have been observed there since April 2016.

In late 2016, photographs emerged which suggested that Fiery Cross Reef has been armed with anti-aircraft weapons and a CIWS missile-defense system.

== Yongshu Airport ==
Yongshu Airport
- IATA: none; ICAO: none

Summary
- Airport type: Military
- Owner: China
- Operator: People's Liberation Army Navy
- Location: Fiery Cross Reef

Map
- Location of airport in the South China Sea

Runways
Direction	Length		Surface
Direction	ft	m	Surface
05/23	10,800	3,300	Concrete

== See also ==
- Great Wall of Sand
- Mischief Reef
- Nine-dash line
- Subi Reef
