= Nansha, Sansha =

Municipal district of Sansha, Hainan, China

Nansha 南沙区
- District Chinese People's Liberation Army occupation
- Nansha, Sansha (South China Sea) Location of the major islands in Nansha District
- Country: People's Republic of China
- Province: Hainan
- Prefecture-level city: Sansha

Government
  - Type: County-level division

Area
  - Total: 886,000 km^{2} (342,000 sq mi)
  - Land: 11 km^{2} (4.2 sq mi)
- Time zone: UTC+8 (China Standard Time)
- Territorial Dispute: There are on-going territorial disputes in the entire area covered by the district, whose administrative authority is not internationally recognized.

Nansha District
- Simplified Chinese: 南沙区
- Literal meaning: Southern Sands
Transcriptions
Standard Mandarin
- Hanyu Pinyin: Nánshā Qū Qū

Nansha District is the municipal district of Sansha, Hainan that governs the islands and reefs of the disputed Spratly Islands and their sea areas. The People's Government of Nansha District is located in Yongshu Reef (Nansha Management Area).

Along with Xisha, Nansha District was created on April 18, 2020.

== Administrative divisions ==
Name	Chinese (S)	Hanyu Pinyin	Residential community
Yongshu	永暑	Yǒngshǔ	1 (Yongshu)

== See also ==
- Chinese cutter Nansha - named after the district
