= Nine-dash line =

Contested Chinese map of South China Sea

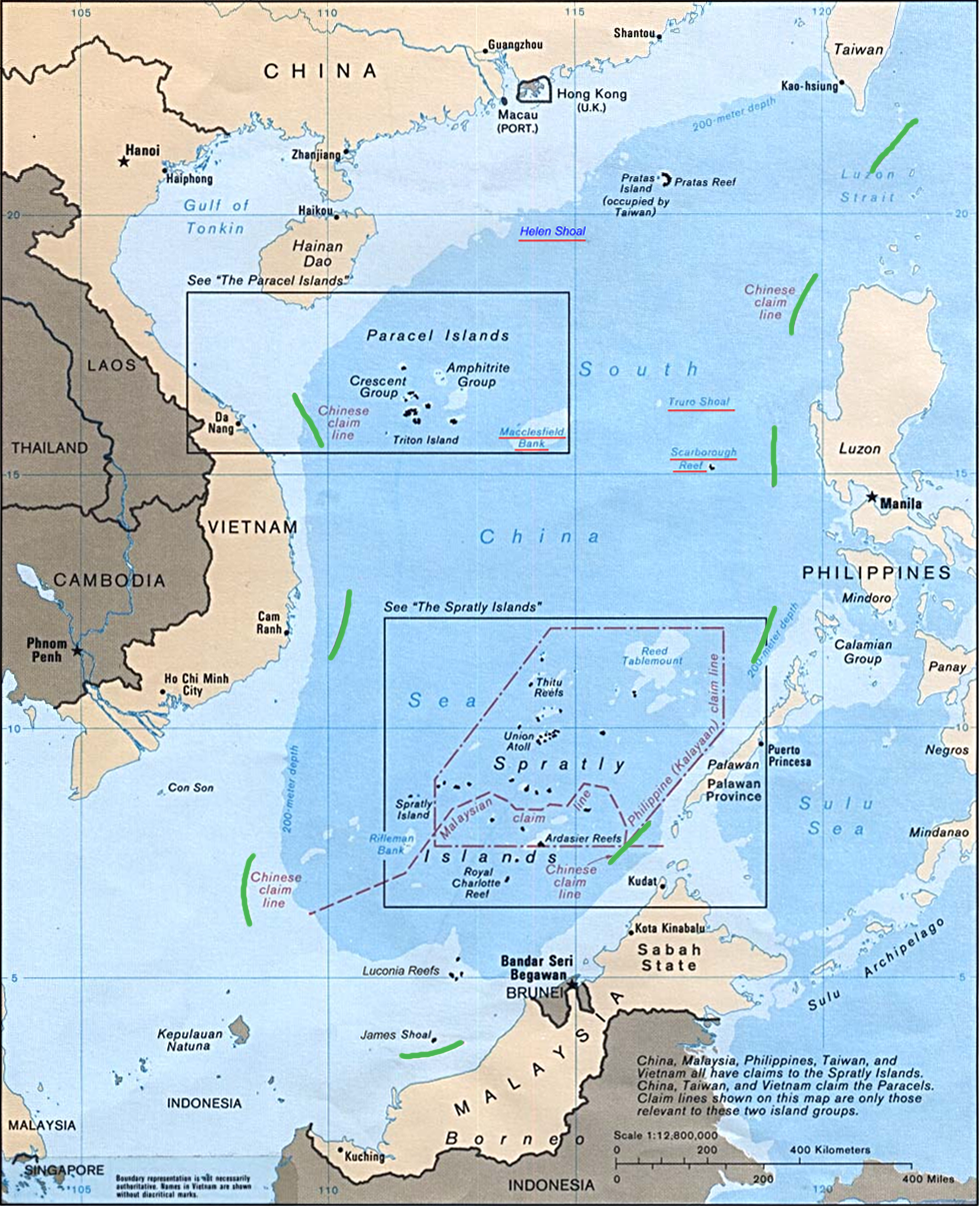
- The nine-dash line (in green)

Chinese name
- Traditional Chinese: 九段線
- Simplified Chinese: 九段线
- Literal meaning: nine-segment line
Transcriptions
Standard Mandarin
- Hanyu Pinyin: jiǔduàn xiàn
- Wade–Giles: chiu-tuan hsien

Eleven-dash line
- Traditional Chinese: 十一段線
- Simplified Chinese: 十一段线
- Literal meaning: eleven-segment line
Transcriptions
Standard Mandarin
- Hanyu Pinyin: shíyīduàn xiàn
- Wade–Giles: shih-i-tuan hsien

Vietnamese name
- Vietnamese alphabet: Đường chín đoạn
- Literal meaning: nine-segment line

The nine-dash line, also referred to as the eleven-dash line by Taiwan, is a set of line segments on various maps that accompany the claims of the People's Republic of China (PRC, "Mainland China") and the Republic of China (ROC, "Taiwan") in the South China Sea.

The contested area includes the Paracel Islands, (Note: The Paracel Islands are occupied by the PRC, but are also claimed by Vietnam and the ROC.) the Spratly Islands, (Note: The Spratly Islands are disputed by the Philippines, PRC, ROC, Brunei, Malaysia, and Vietnam, who each claim either part or all the islands.) the Pratas Island and the Vereker Banks, the Macclesfield Bank, and the Scarborough Shoal. Certain places have undergone land reclamation by the PRC, ROC, and Vietnam. The People's Daily of the PRC uses the term Duànxùxiàn (Tuan-hsü-hsien; 断续线) or Nánhǎi Duànxùxiàn (Nan-hai tuan-hsü-hsien; 南海断续线; lit. 'South Sea intermittent line'), while the ROC government uses the term Shíyīduàn xiàn (Shih-i-tuan hsien; 十一段線; lit. 'eleven-segment line').

A 1946 map showing a U-shaped eleven-dash line was first published by the Republic of China government on 1 December 1947. In 1952, Mao Zedong of the PRC decided to remove two of the dashes in the Gulf of Tonkin amid warming ties with North Vietnam. However, the ROC government still uses the eleven-dash line. In 2013, some were surprised by an additional dash to the east of Taiwan as part of a ten-dash line, but this had been shown in PRC maps since 1984. As of 2014, the PRC government had not clarified what it specifically claims within the line. In 2020, China clarified that it does not claim all the area within the nine-dash line as its internal waters or territorial sea.

On 12 July 2016, an arbitral tribunal organized under the United Nations Convention on the Law of the Sea (UNCLOS) rejected certain forms of Chinese claims within the nine-dash line. It did not rule on matters of territorial sovereignty. (Note: PCA Award, Section V(F)(d)(264, 266, 267), p. 113.) (Note: PCA Award, Section V(F)(d)(278), p. 117.) As of November 2023, 27 governments had called for the ruling to be respected. It was rejected by eight governments, including China (PRC) and Taiwan (ROC).

== History of the line segments ==
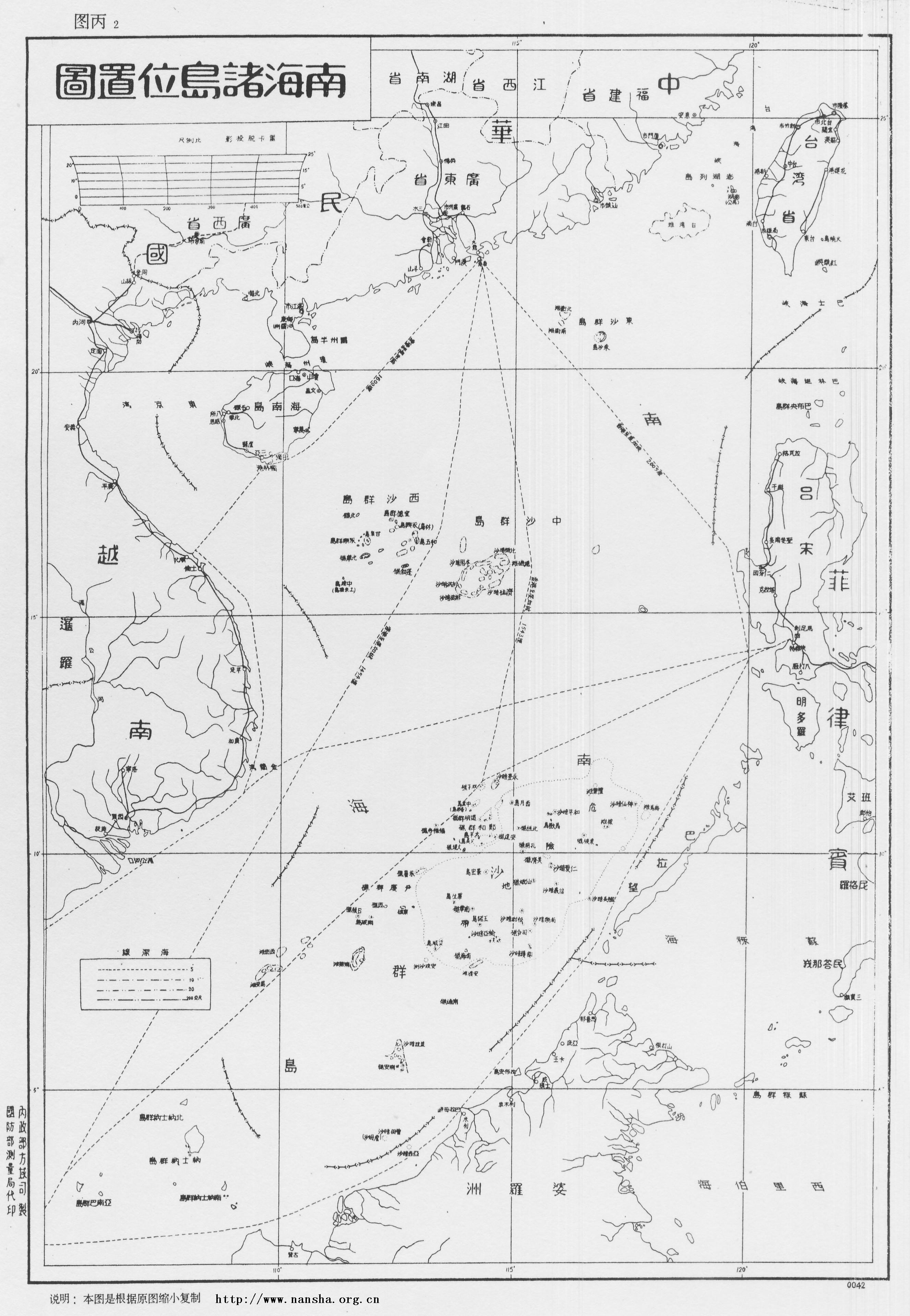
"Location Map of South Sea Islands" (Chinese: 南海諸島位置圖; Wade–Giles: Nan hai chu tao wei chih tʻu) circa 1947

In December 1947, the Ministry of Interior of the Nationalist government released "Location Map of South Sea Islands" (Chinese: 南海諸島位置圖; Wade–Giles: Nan hai chu tao wei chih tʻu) showing an eleven-dash line. Scholarly accounts place its publication from 1946 to 1948 and indicate that it originated from an earlier one titled "Map of Chinese Islands in the South China Sea" (Chinese: 中国南海岛屿图; Wade–Giles: Chung kuo nan hai tao yü tʻu) published by the ROC Land and Water Maps Inspection Committee in 1935. Beginning in 1952, the People's Republic of China (PRC) used a revised map with nine dashes, removing the two dashes in the Gulf of Tonkin. The change was interpreted as a concession to the newly independent North Vietnam; the maritime border between PRC and Vietnam in the Gulf of Tonkin was eventually formalized by treaty in 2000.

After retreating to Taiwan in 1949, the ROC government continued to claim the Spratly and Paracel Islands. President Lee Teng-hui claimed that "legally, historically, geographically, or in reality", all of the South China Sea and Spratly islands were ROC territory and under ROC sovereignty, and denounced actions undertaken there by the Philippines and Malaysia. Taiwan and China have the same claims and have cooperated with each other during international talks involving the Spratly Islands.

The nine-dash line map on the second page of PRC's 2009 submission to the UN

In May 2009, Malaysia and Vietnam submitted claims to the UN Commission on the Limits of the Continental Shelf to extend their respective continental shelves. In objection, the PRC communicated two Notes Verbales to the UN Secretary General stating:

China has indisputable sovereignty over the islands in the South China Sea and the adjacent waters, and enjoys sovereign rights and jurisdiction over the relevant waters as well as the seabed and subsoil thereof (see attached map). The above position is consistently held by the Chinese government, and is widely known by the international community.

— Permanent Mission of the People's Republic of China, Notes Verbales CML/17/2009 and CML/18/2009

Its submissions were accompanied by maps depicting nine dashes in the South China Sea. Immediately afterwards, Malaysia and Vietnam protested China's submission. Indonesia followed suit a year later, and the Philippines two years later. In 2011, the PRC submitted another note verbale to the UN conveying a similar message but without mentioning the line.

Although not visible on the 2009 map, modern Chinese maps since 1984, including the vertically oriented maps published in 2013 and 2014, have also included a tenth dash to the east of Taiwan. Some were nonetheless surprised when the tenth dash appeared in a 2013 map, even though it was not in the South China Sea. Meanwhile, the ROC (Taiwan) has rejected all rival claims to the Paracel islands, repeating its position that all of the Paracel, Spratly, Zhongsha (Macclesfield Bank grouped with Scarborough Shoal) and Pratas Island belong to the ROC along with "their surrounding waters and respective seabed and subsoil". Taiwan views other claims as illegitimate, releasing a statement through its Ministry of Foreign Affairs stating "there is no doubt that the Republic of China has sovereignty over the archipelagos and waters".

On September 9, 2020, Wang Yi, State Councilor and Foreign Minister of China, stated, "The allegation that China claims all waters within the dotted line as its internal waters and territorial sea is totally unfounded." He called it a "deliberate attempt to confuse different concepts".

In 2023, re-publication of the line in a map from China's Ministry of Natural Resources drew protests from the Philippines, Taiwan, Vietnam, Malaysia, and Japan.

=== Analysis ===
The nine-dash line has been used by the PRC inconsistently and with ambiguity. It is not clear whether the map constitutes a part of China's historical claims or serves only illustrative purposes. The PRC has not clarified the line's legal nature in terms of how the dashes would be joined and which of the maritime features inside are specifically being claimed. Analysts from the U.S. Department of State posit three different explanations—that it indicates only the islands within are being claimed, that a maritime area including other features are being claimed, or that a claim is being made as historical waters of China. A claim to only the islands and associated rights is most consistent with past PRC publications and statements, whereas the other two arguments would put China's claim at greater conflict with the UNCLOS. China's actual claim likely does not include all or most of the waters in the region and appears to center around island features and whatever entitlements that are associated with them, including non-exclusive fishing rights.

== Ongoing disputes ==
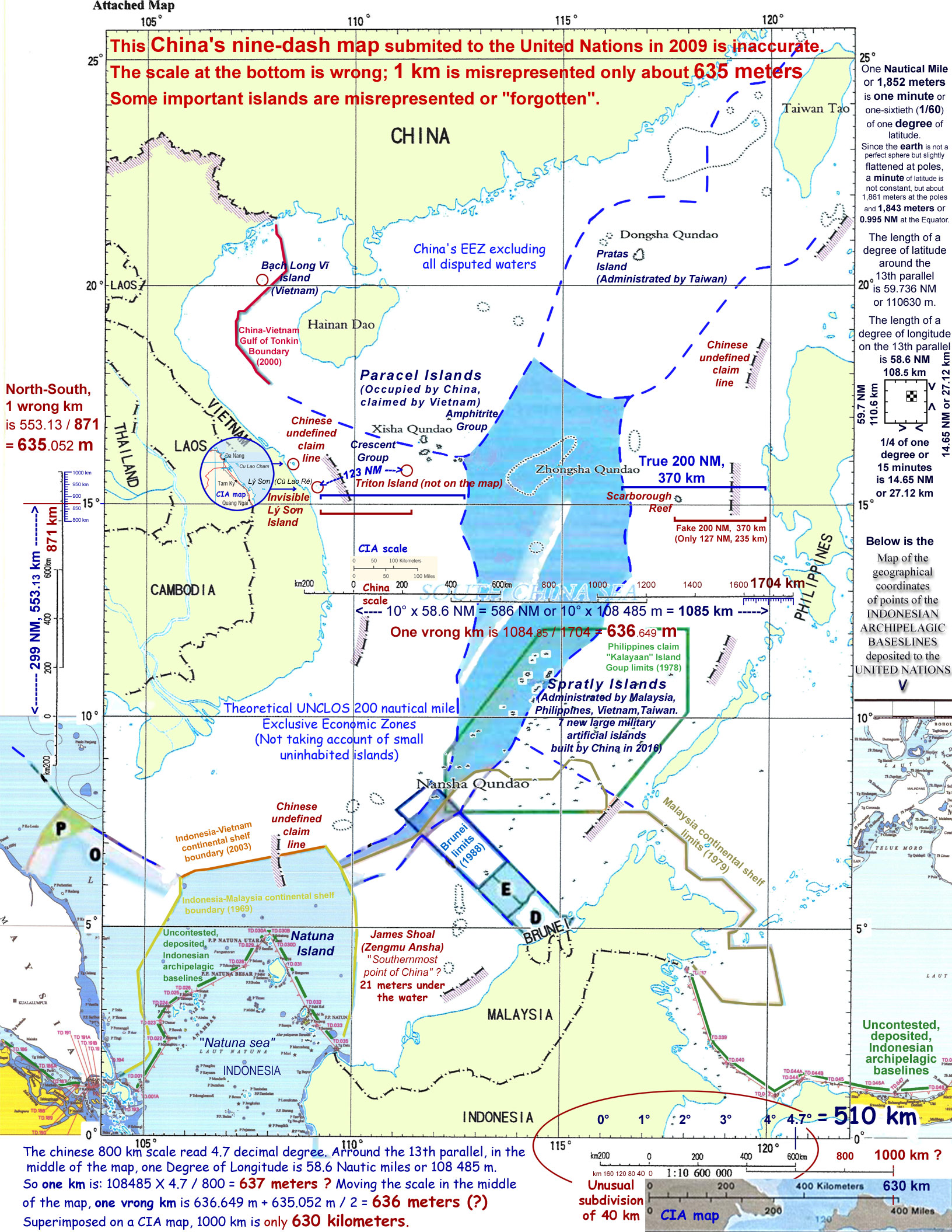
The nine-dash line map uses an incorrect scale.

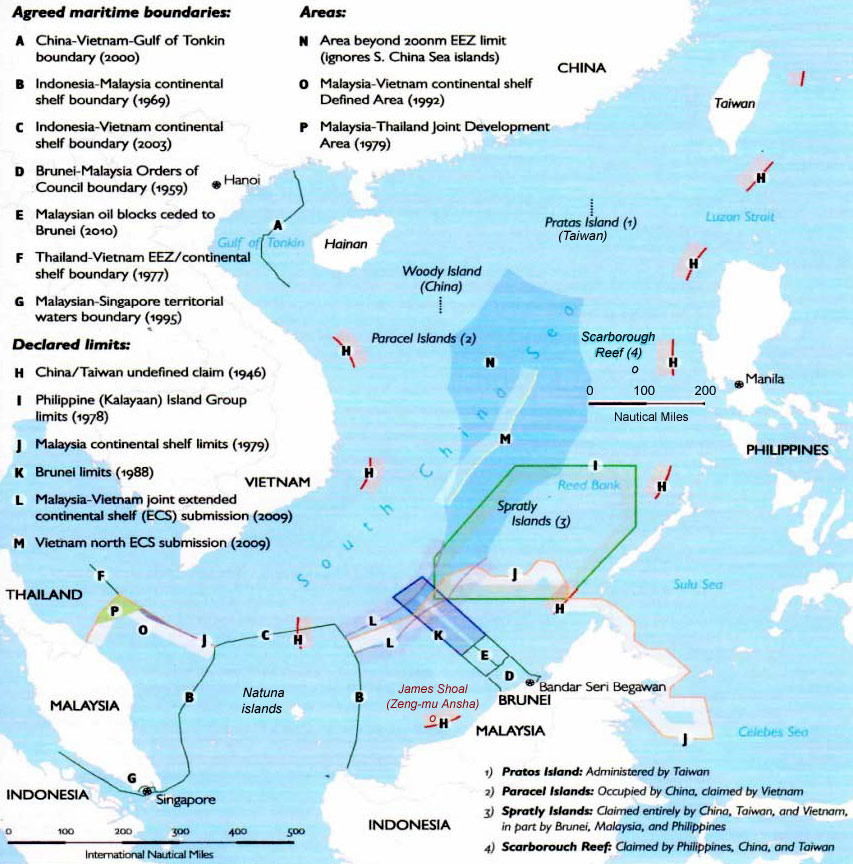
South China Sea claims and agreements (showing the nine-dash line as well as an additional tenth dash near the island of Taiwan).

According to former Philippine President Benigno Aquino III, "China's nine-dash line territorial claim over the entire South China Sea is against international laws, particularly the United Nations Convention of the Laws of the Sea (UNCLOS)".

Vietnam also rejects the Chinese claim, citing that it is baseless and contrary to UNCLOS. The line is often referred to in Vietnam as Đường lưỡi bò (lit. 'cow's tongue line').

Parts of China's nine-dash line overlap Indonesia's exclusive economic zone near the Natuna islands. Indonesia believes China's claim over parts of the Natuna islands has no legal basis. In November 2015, Indonesia's security chief Luhut Binsar Pandjaitan said Indonesia could take China before an international court if Beijing's claim to the majority of the South China Sea and part of Indonesian territory is not resolved through dialogue.

Researcher Sourabh Gupta questioned the applicability of the United Nations Convention on the Law of the Sea to the dispute, arguing that the convention does not support claims based on sovereignty or title, and instead supports the right to continue using the waters for traditional purpose such as fishing.

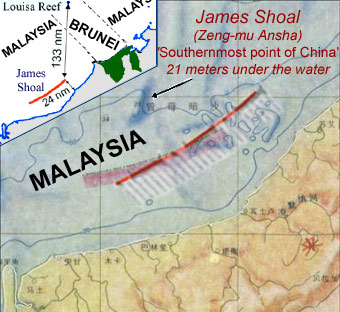
Dash 4 location in Chinese 2009 (solid red) and 1984 maps. Dash 4 is 24 nautical miles from the coast of Malaysia on the island of Borneo and 133 nautical miles from Louisa Reef. James Shoal (Zeng-mu Ansha), the "Southernmost point of China", lay 21 metres (69 ft) under the sea, according to the 1984 map.

A 2012 Chinese eighth-grade geography textbook includes a map of China with the nine-dash line and the text "The southernmost point of our country's territory is Zengmu Ansha (James Shoal) in the Nansha Islands." Shan Zhiqiang, the executive chief editor of the Chinese National Geography magazine, wrote in 2013: "The nine-dashed line ... is now deeply engraved in the hearts and minds of the Chinese people."

According to a leaked diplomatic cable from September 2008, the United States Embassy in Beijing reported that a senior Chinese government maritime law expert said he was unaware of the historical basis for the nine dashes.

At the Conference on Maritime Study organized by the US-based Center for Strategic and International Studies (CSIS) in June 2011, Su Hao of the China Foreign Affairs University in Beijing delivered a speech on China's sovereignty and policy in the South China Sea, using history as the main argument. However, Termsak Chalermpalanupap, assistant director for Program Coordination and External Relations of the ASEAN Secretariat, said: "I don't think that the 1982 United Nations Convention on the Law of the Sea (UNCLOS) recognizes history as the basis to make sovereignty claims". Peter Dutton of the US Naval War College agreed, saying, "The jurisdiction over waters does not have connection to history. It must observe the UNCLOS." Dutton stressed that using history to explain sovereignty erodes the rules of the UNCLOS. It is understood that China ratified the UNCLOS in 1996.

Maritime researcher Carlyle Thayer, emeritus Professor of Politics of the University of New South Wales, said that Chinese scholars using historical heritage to explain its claim of sovereignty shows the lack of legal foundation for the claim under international law. Caitlyn Antrim, executive director, Rule of Law Committee for the Oceans of the US, commented that "The U-shaped line has no ground under the international law because [the] historical basis is very weak". She added "I don't understand what China claims for in that U-shaped line. If they claim sovereignty over islands inside that line, the question is whether they are able to prove their sovereignty over these islands. If China claimed sovereignty over these islands 500 years ago and then they did not perform their sovereignty, their claim of sovereignty becomes very weak. For uninhabited islands, they can only claim territorial seas, not exclusive economic zones (EEZ) from the islands". Wu Shicun, president of China's National Institute for South China Sea Studies, claimed that today's international law "cannot overwrite existing facts of the past".

In 2020, Voice of America reported that China has been putting out "constant reminders" of the nine-dash line in scholarly journals, maps, T-shirts, and films over the past decade. Jay Batongbacal, a professor at the University of the Philippines, called them "subtle propaganda". Gregory Poling, director of the Asia Maritime Transparency Initiative at the Center for Strategic and International Studies, said the target audience is third-world countries. A researcher at the Diplomatic Academy of Vietnam expressed her own observations that the publication of the nine-dash line in scientific journals has increased since 2010, namely in articles from China. According to some scholars, the inclusion of the U-shaped line in maps is required by Chinese law. Nature has stated that it remains neutral regarding any jurisdictional claims published in the journal. It has asked authors to depoliticize their work and mark controversial designations, and its editors reserve the right to label disputed claims. Elsevier indicated that the legality of the nine-dash line is disputed.

=== Arbitral tribunal's ruling ===
In January 2013, the Philippines initiated arbitration proceedings against China under the United Nations Convention on the Law of the Sea (UNCLOS) over a range of issues, including the latter's historic rights claims inside the nine-dash line. A tribunal of arbitrators constituted under Annex VII of UNCLOS appointed the Permanent Court of Arbitration (PCA) as the registry to the proceedings.

The Philippines' initiation of the arbitration was followed by extensive internal debates among Chinese policymakers about whether China should participate in the arbitration. Participating and losing could impact domestic sentiment and might have regional implications for China's other maritime territorial claims. The nine-dash line predated UNCLOS, and its lack of defined coordinates was a weakness under current international law. Chinese policymakers had previously sought to preserve the ambiguity of its status in an effort to preserve the status quo and manage its claims and relations with neighbors. Policymakers were also reticent because of concerns that the proceedings would not be fair, citing the fact that the president of ITLOS, Shunji Yanai, was Japanese. Some policymakers also were concerned about the procedure given that China had no precedent for using arbitration to resolve territorial disagreements. Others favored participation in order to be able to shape the proceedings, including because only by participating would China have the ability to appoint an arbitrator to the panel.

On 12 July 2016, the tribunal ruled in favor of the Philippines on most of its submissions. While it would not "rule on any question of sovereignty over land territory and would not delimit any maritime boundary between the Parties", it concluded that China had not exercised exclusive control over the waters within the nine-dash line historically and has "no legal basis" to claim "historic rights" to the resources there. It also concluded that China's historic rights claims over the maritime areas (as opposed to land masses and territorial waters) inside the nine-dash line would have no lawful effect beyond what it is entitled to under the UNCLOS. (Note: PCA Award, Section V(F)(d)(264, 266, 267), p. 113.) (Note: PCA Award, Section V(F)(d)(278), p. 117.) China rejected the ruling, calling it "ill-founded"; its paramount leader Xi Jinping said that "China's territorial sovereignty and marine rights in the South China Sea will not be affected by the so-called Philippines South China Sea ruling in any way", but China was still "committed to resolving disputes" with its neighbors. China's grounds for rejecting the ruling include its decision to exclude itself from the compulsory arbitration provisions of UNCLOS when it ratified UNCLOS in 2006.

Immediately following the ruling, China released a number of documents reaffirming their claims in four specific areas: sovereignty over all the islands in the South China Sea; internal waters, territorial seas and contiguous zones of those islands; EEZs and continental shelfs of these islands; and historical rights. These documents did not mention the nine-dash line in relation to the claims. The Australian Strategic Policy Institute commented, "The quiet disappearance of the 'nine-dash line' from China's official claims is a major policy change [...] implying that China doesn't take it as a territorial demarcation line—that is, China doesn't claim 90% of the South China Sea as 'a Chinese lake', as is so often alleged in international media."

Taiwan, which currently administers Taiping Island, the largest of the Spratly Islands, also rejected the ruling and deployed a coast guard vessel to the island/rock, with a naval frigate mission also scheduled.

Academic Graham Allison observed in 2016, "None of the five permanent members of the UN Security Council have ever accepted any international court's ruling when (in their view) it infringed their sovereignty or national security interests. Thus, when China rejects the Court's decision in this case, it will be doing just what the other great powers have repeatedly done for decades."

== Media appearances and reactions ==
The DreamWorks Animation-Pearl Studio animated film Abominable included a scene with the nine-dash line, which generated controversy in the Philippines, Vietnam and Malaysia although the film was simply depicting maps as sold in China. The Philippines and Vietnam banned the film, and Malaysia followed suit after the producers refused to cut the scene.

In October 2019, an ESPN broadcast used a map that appeared to endorse China's claims to Taiwan and the nine-dash line, causing controversy.

On 5 November 2019, Vietnam confiscated some Chinese imported Volkswagen SUVs due to the presence of the Nine Dash Line in the car's navigation system.

On 7 November 2019, Vietnam ordered checks for phone brands Huawei And Xiaomi as their maps showed the Nine Dash Line.

In 2021, Netflix pulled TV series Pine Gap from its Vietnamese service, following an order from the country's Authority of Broadcasting and Electronic Information, as a map with the nine-dash line was briefly shown in two episodes of the series. The TV series Put Your Head on My Shoulder was also pulled from Vietnam, after the nine-dash line appeared briefly on the ninth episode of the series. The country's Authority of Broadcasting and Electronic Information released a statement that Netflix had angered and hurt the feelings of the entire people of Vietnam.

In November 2021, the Movie and Television Review and Classification Board of the Philippines also removed Pine Gap from Netflix, deeming it "unfit for public exhibition" for "violating Philippine sovereignty".

In March 2022, the Vietnam Film Authority banned the movie Uncharted because it contained an image of a nine-dash line map. By April 2022, the Philippines followed suit.

On 5 July 2023, Vietnam's Ministry of Culture, Sports and Tourism announced that it had ordered an inspection of the official website of IME, a talent management and event organising company based in Beijing, China, for allegedly featuring the nine-dash line in the map of East and Southeast Asia. On the following day, 6 July, Brian Chow, the CEO of IME, stated that it was an "unfortunate misunderstanding", but added that the company was committed to replace the images in question. At the time of the controversy, IME has scheduled two concerts of Blackpink (a South Korean girl band managed by YG Entertainment) in Hanoi, Vietnam, as a part of the Born Pink World Tour, and some Vietnamese netizens called for a boycott of the concerts or any event organised by IME.

On 10 July 2023, Vietnam's Department of Cinema ordered Netflix and FPT Telecom to remove Chinese drama series Flight to You from their platforms within 24 hours; the department found the appearances of the nine-dash line in nine episodes. FPT Telecom already blurred the maps in question for its service, but was ordered to take down the entire series nonetheless.

In 2024, the Philippines' Movie and Television Review and Classification Board banned the film 'Chasing Tuna In The Ocean' from domestic exhibition as it showed the nine-dash line.

On March 13, 2025, Vietnamese authorities ordered an inspection of Chinese dolls whose facial marks were interpreted as representing the nine-dash line after an online outcry that lead to dolls being removed from the market by retailers.

On March 20, 2025, Chinese beverage chain Chagee underwent investigation in Vietnam due to the nine-dash line being used in the map of the mobile ordering application.

In January 2026, Netflix, at the request of Vietnam's culture ministry, withdrew its production On Shine On Me[zh] as an episode displayed a map of the nine-dash line.

=== Map drawing in Barbie ===
On 3 July 2023, Vietnam banned the live-action Barbie film, alleging that scenes in the film display the nine-dash line map over the South China Sea. The Tiền Phong newspaper reported that the nine-dash line appears multiple times in the film. Regarding one scene that features a child-like drawing of a world map with dashed lines, the film's distributor, Warner Bros., defended these claims by stating that the map is a children's drawing and has no intended meaning. On 11 July, the Philippines' Movie and Television Review and Classification Board allowed the film to be screened in the country, but requested Warner Bros. to "blur the controversial lines in order to avoid further misinterpretations". It said the line, which was part of Barbie's journey from her fictional universe to the "real world", was not U-shaped and did not have nine dashes. Other dashed lines can be seen near the United States, Greenland, Brazil and Africa.

Speaking to Voice of America on Vietnam's ban of the 2023 Barbie film, Trịnh Hữu Long (founder of the research group Legal Initiatives for Vietnam) said "The Vietnamese government is surely using legitimate nationalist reasoning to strengthen its entire censorship system," while Michael Caster at the free expression group Article 19 said "Maps are political, and borders often bear historical wounds, but rather than ensuring free and open discussion, the knee jerk response to censor seldom supports historical or transitional justice". Speaking to Vox, UC Berkeley professor Peter Zinoman said, "To the Chinese, the nine-dash line signifies their legitimate claims to the South China Sea," and "To the Vietnamese, it symbolizes a brazen act of imperialist bullying that elevates Chinese national interest over an older shared set of interests of socialist brotherhood."

== See also ==
- Baselines of the Chinese territorial sea
- Foreign policy of China
  - Foreign relations of China
- List of irredentist claims or disputes
- Territorial disputes in the South China Sea
