= Johnson Reef =

Johnson Reef may refer to a number of maritime features in the Union Bank / Union Reefs of the Spratly Islands:

- Johnson North Reef, also known as North Johnson Reef, Collins Reef and other names
- Johnson South Reef, a.k.a. South Johnson Reef, Chìguā Jiāo, Đá Gạc Ma, Chigua Reef, Gạc Ma Reef and Mabini reef

== See also ==
- Johnson South Reef Skirmish
