= Whitsun Reef =

Reef in the South China Sea

Disputed reef
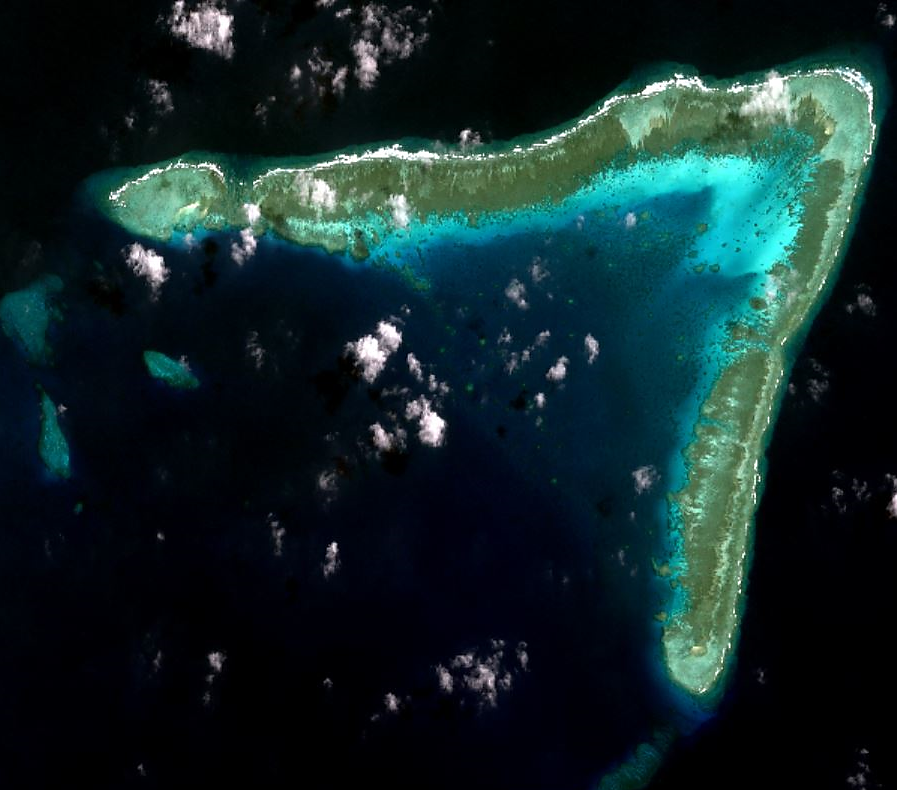
- Whitsun Reef in 2011. Sand banks along the north shore are visible.

- Other names: Whitson Reef; Whitsum Reef; Julian Felipe Reef (Philippine English); Bahura ng Julian Felipe (Filipino) 牛轭礁 Niú è jiāo (Chinese); Đá Ba Đầu (Vietnamese)

Geography
- Location: South China Sea
- Coordinates: 9°59′38″N 114°39′27″E

Claimed by
- China
- Philippines
- Taiwan
- Vietnam

Whitsun Reef, also known as Whitson Reef, Whitsum Reef, and Julian Felipe Reef (Filipino: Bahura ng Julian Felipe; Mandarin Chinese: 牛轭礁; pinyin: Niú è jiāo; Vietnamese: Đá Ba Đầu), is a reef at the northeast extreme limit of the Union Banks in the Spratly Islands of the South China Sea. It is the largest reef of the Union Banks.

== Topography ==
The reef is V-shaped with an area of about 10 km^{2} (3.9 sq mi). Until at least the 1990s, it was above the water only during low tide; at other times the reef could be detected by the pattern of breaking waves. At the end of the 20th century, small sand dunes had developed on the reef making a territorial claim possible (an International Court of Justice judgment in 2012 stated that “low-tide elevations cannot be appropriated"). The development of the dunes could have occurred naturally, but it was rumoured that the island was being built up by Vietnam and China.

== Territorial disputes ==
As of 2016, the reef was unclaimed; reports to the contrary (Chinese control) were based on a confusion. However, due to the reef's strategic importance it was expected that the reef would be occupied "soon".

On 21 March 2021, about 220 Chinese fishing ships were moored at the reef ostensibly taking shelter due to the sea conditions. The Philippines considers the reef to be within its exclusive economic zone and continental shelf and protested the Chinese presence. Vietnam, which also claims the reef, also protested against Chinese presence in the area.

== See also ==
- Great Wall of Sand
- Johnson South Reef Skirmish
- Nine-dash line
- Sino-Vietnamese conflicts (1979–1991)
