= Johnson South Reef skirmish =

1988 Chinese naval victory over Vietnam

- Part of the Third Indochina War, Sino-Vietnamese conflicts 1979–91 and the Spratly Islands dispute
- Map of the Union Banks, where the skirmish occurred
Date	14 March 1988
Location	Johnson South Reef 9°43′N 114°17′E
Result	Chinese victory
Territorial changes	China establishes control over Johnson South Reef; Vietnam retains control over Collins Reef and Lansdowne Reef.

Belligerents
China; People's Liberation Army; People's Liberation Army Navy	Vietnam; People's Army of Vietnam; Vietnam People's Navy

Commanders and leaders
Chen Weiwen	Trần Đức Thông †; Lê Lệnh Sơn; Vũ Phi Trừ †; Vũ Huy Lê

Units involved
Nanchong (502) frigate; Xiangtan (556) frigate; Yingtan (531) frigate	HQ-505 tank landing ship; HQ-604 transport; HQ-605 transport

Casualties and losses
Per China: 1 wounded; Per Vietnam: 6 killed 18 wounded 3 landing craft damaged	64 killed; 11 wounded; 9 captured; 2 transporters sunk; 1 tank landing ship destroyed

The Johnson South Reef skirmish took place on 14 March 1988 between military forces of China and Vietnam, on the Johnson South Reef in the Union Banks region of the Spratly Islands, in the South China Sea.

== Background ==
The Spratly Islands are a group of over 100 small islands, reefs and atolls located in the South China Sea. They are the subject of a territorial dispute between Brunei, China, Malaysia, the Philippines, Taiwan, and Vietnam. At the time of the incident, both China and Vietnam claimed ownership of the entire island group.

The Intergovernmental Oceanographic Commission (IOC) is a UNESCO body which coordinates international study in the field of oceanography. Scientists at the 14th congress of the IOC agreed that China would establish five observation posts for a worldwide ocean survey, the Global Sea Level Observing System (GLOSS), including one in the Spratly Islands. The IOC officially commissioned China to build the observation post in March 1987. China's delegate to the meeting spoke highly of GLOSS, but complained that a table in the agreement listed Taiwan as a country. The scientists working on GLOSS were unaware that China claims that Taiwan is not a separate country; nor did they know about the territorial disputes over the Spratly Islands. The IOC agreement stated that China would install tide gauges on its coasts in the East China Sea, and on the 'Nansha Islands' (China's name for the Spratly Islands) in the South China Sea. The scientists were also unaware that Taiwan already occupied one of the Spratly Islands, while China did not occupy any (despite its territorial claims). After performing surveys and patrols of the region, in April 1987 China selected Fiery Cross Reef as their preferred location for the observation post, because the unoccupied reef was large enough to install the required equipment and remote from other occupied islands.

Johnson South Reef, part of the Union Banks sunken atoll, is located 150 kilometres (93 mi) east of Fiery Cross Reef. Johnson South Reef is close to Sin Cowe Island (also in the Union Banks) which was occupied by Vietnam, and within the 200-nautical-mile Exclusion Economic Zone of the Philippines – a high profile and highly disputed area. In January and February 1988, Vietnamese forces began establishing a military presence on additional reefs, including Collins Reef and Lansdowne Reef in the Union Banks, to monitor the Chinese activity around Fiery Cross Reef. This led to a series of confrontations.

== Incident ==
Accounts of the incident differ substantially between the participants, with both Vietnam and China claiming that the other side initiated combat.

=== China's account ===
According to China, on 13 March, the frigate Nanchong detected People's Army of Vietnam (PAVN) armed naval transport HQ-604 heading toward Johnson South Reef, transport HQ-605 heading toward Lansdowne Reef, and landing craft HQ-505 heading toward Collins Reef in a simultaneous three-pronged intrusion upon the disputed reefs. They ignored the Nanchong's warnings for them to leave.

At approximately 07:30 on Johnson South Reef, Vietnamese troops attempted to erect the Vietnamese flag on the reef. It was reported that PAVN Corporal Nguyen Van Lanh and PAVN Sub Lieutenant Tran Van Phuong argued over the flag raising with People's Liberation Army Navy (PLAN) sailor Du Xianghou, which led to fighting between the opposing forces on the reef. In response, Vietnamese forces, with naval transport HQ-604 in support, opened fire. PLAN forces and the frigate Nanchong counter-attacked at 08:47 hours. Transport HQ-604 was set ablaze and sunk.

At 09:15 hours, the frigate Xiangtan arrived at Lansdowne Reef and found that nine Vietnamese marines from transport HQ-605 had already landed. The frigate Xiangtan immediately hailed the Vietnamese and demanded they withdraw from the reef. Instead, the Vietnamese opened fire. HQ-605 was heavily damaged and finally sunk by the Chinese.

=== Vietnam's account ===
According to Vietnam, in January 1988, China sent a group of ships from Hainan to the southern part of the South China Sea. This included four ships, including three frigates, dispatched to the north-west of the Spratly Islands. The four ships then began provoking and harassing the Vietnamese ships around Tizard Bank and the London Reefs. Vietnam believed this battle group intended to create a reason to "occupy the Spratly Islands in a preventive counterstrike".

In response, two transport ships from the Vietnamese Navy's 125th Naval Transport Brigade, HQ-604 and HQ-505, were mobilized. They carried nearly 100 army officers and men to Johnson South Reef (Đá Gạc Ma), Collins Reef (Đá Cô Lin), and Lansdowne Reef (Đá Len Đao) in the Spratly Islands. On 14 March 1988, as the soldiers from HQ-604 were moving construction materials to Johnson South Reef, the four Chinese ships arrived. The three Chinese frigates approached the reef:

- Nanchong (502) (Jiangnan class / Type 065). Displaces 1,400 tons, equipped with three 100 mm guns and eight 37 mm AA guns.
- Xiangtan (556) (Jianghu-II class / Type 053H1). Displaces 1,925 tons, equipped with four 100 mm guns and two 37 mm AA guns.
- Yingtan (531) (Jiangdong class / Type 053K). Displaces 1,925 tons, equipped with four 100 mm guns and eight 37 mm AA guns.

Commander Tran Duc Thong ordered Second Lieutenant Tran Van Phuong and two men, Nguyen Van Tu and Nguyen Van Lanh, to rush to the reef in a small boat and protect the Vietnamese flag that had been planted there the previous day. The Chinese landed armed soldiers on the reef, and the PLAN frigates opened fire on the Vietnamese ships. Both the HQ-604 and HQ-605 transport ships were sunk. The HQ-505 transport ship was ordered to run aground on Collins Reef to prevent the Chinese from taking it.

Vietnamese soldiers, most of them unarmed, formed a circle on the reef to protect the Vietnamese flag. The Chinese attacked, and the Vietnamese soldiers resisted as best they could. A skirmish ensued in which the Chinese shot and bayoneted some Vietnamese soldiers to death, but the Chinese were unable to capture the flag. The Chinese finally retreated, enabling PLAN frigates to open fire on the reef's defenders. When all of the Vietnamese had been killed or wounded, the Chinese occupied the reef and began building a bunker. 64 Vietnamese soldiers had been killed in the battle according to Vietnamese reports. Vietnam also accused China of refusing to allow Vietnam's Red Cross ship to recover bodies and rescue wounded soldiers.

The Soviet Union at the time did not want to help Vietnam as its relationship with China was improving, although at the time the Soviet navy was stationed in Cam Ranh Bay and the Soviets had a mutual defense treaty with Hanoi. The Soviet Union even refused Vietnam's proposal to send a water tanker for supplies.

=== Academic assessments ===
Cheng Tun-jen and Tien Hung-mao, two American professors, summarized the skirmish as follows: in late 1987, the PRC started deploying troops to some of the unoccupied reefs of the Spratly Islands. Soon after the PLA stormed the Johnson South Reef on 14 March 1988, a skirmish began between Vietnamese troops and PRC landing parties. Within a year, the PLA occupied and took over seven reefs and rocks in the Spratly Islands.

Koo Min Gyo, Assistant Professor in the Department of Public Administration at Yonsei University, Seoul, South Korea, reported the battle's course was as follows: On 31 January 1988, two Vietnamese armed cargo ships approached the Fiery Cross Reef to get construction material to build structures signifying Vietnam's claim over the reef. However, the PLAN intercepted the ships and forced them away from the reef. On 17 February, a group of Chinese ships (a PLAN destroyer, escort, and transport ships) and several Vietnamese ships (a minesweeper and armed freighter) all attempted to land troops at Cuarteron Reef. Eventually the outgunned Vietnamese ships were forced to withdraw. On 13 and 14 March, a PLAN artillery frigate was surveying the Johnson Reef when it spotted three Vietnamese ships approaching its location. Both sides dispatched troops to occupy Johnson Reef. After shots were fired by ground forces on the reef, the Chinese and Vietnamese ships opened fire on each other.

== Aftermath ==
China moved quickly to consolidate its presence and by the end of 1988, it had occupied six reefs and atolls in the Spratly Islands. According to Admiral Liu Huaqing's autobiography, the decision to take these six areas arose from the Central Military Commission and was approved by Deng Xiaoping.

On 2 September 1991, China released the nine Vietnamese prisoners taken during the Johnson South Reef skirmish.

In 1994, China had a similar confrontation by asserting its ownership of Mischief Reef, which was inside the claimed exclusive economic zone of the Philippines. However, the Philippines only made a political protest, since according to the Henry L. Stimson Center, the Philippine Navy decided to avoid direct confrontation.

== See also ==
- Battle of the Paracel Islands
- Naval history of China

== Bibliography ==
- The South China Sea Online Resource
- Kelly, Todd C. (Fall 1999). "Vietnamese Claims to the Truong Sa Archipelago". Explorations in Southeast Asian Studies. Vol. 3.
