= USS Bulloch County =

LST-491-class tank landing ship

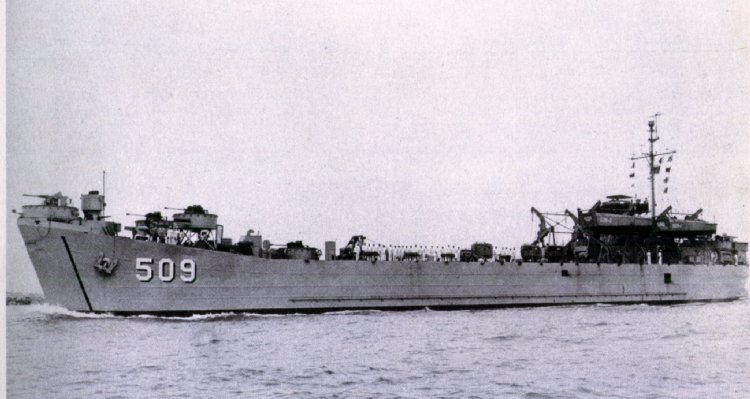
- LST-509 entering NAB Little Creek, Norfolk, Virginia in the spring of 1951

History

United States
- Name: USS LST-509
- Builder: Jeffersonville Boat & Machine Company, Jeffersonville, Indiana
- Laid down: 7 October 1943
- Launched: 23 November 1943
- Commissioned: 20 January 1944
- Decommissioned: 8 April 1970
- Renamed: USS Bulloch County (LST-509), 1 July 1955
- Honours and awards: 1 battle star
- Fate: Leased to the Republic of Vietnam, 1970

South Vietnam
- Name: Qui Nhon (HQ-504)
- Acquired: 8 April 1970
- Fate: Transferred to the Socialist Republic of Vietnam

Socialist Republic of Vietnam
- Name: HQ-505
- Acquired: 1976
- Honours and awards: Hero of the People's Armed Forces
- Fate: Sunk after 1988

General characteristics
- Class & type: LST-491-class tank landing ship
- Displacement: 1,625 long tons (1,651 t) light; 3,640 long tons (3,698 t) full
- Length: 328 ft (100 m)
- Beam: 50 ft (15 m)
- Draft: Unloaded : 2 ft 4 in (0.71 m) forward; 7 ft 6 in (2.29 m) aft; Loaded : 8 ft 2 in (2.49 m) forward; 14 ft 1 in (4.29 m) aft
- Depth: 8 ft (2.4 m) forward; 14 ft 4 in (4.37 m) aft (full load)
- Propulsion: 2 × General Motors 12-567 diesel engines, two shafts, twin rudders
- Speed: 12 knots (22 km/h; 14 mph)
- Boats & landing craft carried: 2 LCVPs
- Troops: Approximately 130 officers and enlisted men
- Complement: 8-10 officers, 89-100 enlisted men
- Armament: 1 × single 3"/50 caliber gun mount; 8 × 40 mm guns; 12 × 20 mm guns

USS Bulloch County (LST-509) was an LST-491-class tank landing ship built for the United States Navy during World War II. Named for Bulloch County, Georgia, she was the only U.S. Naval vessel to bear the name.

LST-509 was laid down on 7 October 1943 at Jeffersonville, Indiana by the Jeffersonville Boat & Machine Company; launched on 23 November 1943; sponsored by Lieutenant (j.g.) Dorothy L. Nims, USCG(W); and commissioned on 20 January 1944.

During World War II, LST-509 was assigned to the European Theater and participated in the Invasion of Normandy in June, 1944. Following the war, LST-509 returned to the United States and was redesignated USS Bulloch County (LST-509) on 1 July 1955.

She was recommissioned in 1966 and served in the Vietnam War until she was transferred to the Republic of Vietnam Navy in April 1970.

She was used primarily for provisioning forward coastal and river US Marine bases such as Tân Mỹ Base (now Thuan An) and Cửa Việt Base located in I Corps and bases further south such as Vũng Tàu, Cam Ranh Bay and Nha Trang.

Other duties included coastal picket and resupply duty during Operation Market Time in which she resupplied and provided off-patrol berthing for Patrol Craft Fast crews interdicting Viet Cong communication and supply routes.

The starboard screw and rudder were once damaged by a floating mine in the Cua Viet River. She continued operations on one screw until another could be fitted at Da Nang. She suffered serious enough storm damage during a typhoon during a voyage to Okinawa in 1969, to require emergency repairs while beached and more complete repairs in a graving dock at Sasebo, Japan.

On 8 April 1970, the ship was decommissioned and leased to the Republic of Vietnam under the Security Assistance Program for service as Qui Nhon (HQ-504). After 1975, she served in the Vietnam People's Navy with new registration as HQ-505.

In 1988 she was heavily damaged in the Johnson South Reef Skirmish by the Chinese frigate Yingtan. The Vietnam People's Navy, in an effort to save her, tried to bring her to Cam Ranh Bay for repair but she sank south of Great Discovery Reef in the Spratly Islands area. The ship and her crew were granted the title of Hero of the People's Armed Forces.

LST-509 earned one battle star for World War II service.

== See also ==
- List of United States Navy LSTs
- Republic of Vietnam Navy
