= Hughes Reef =

Reef in the South China Sea

Disputed reef
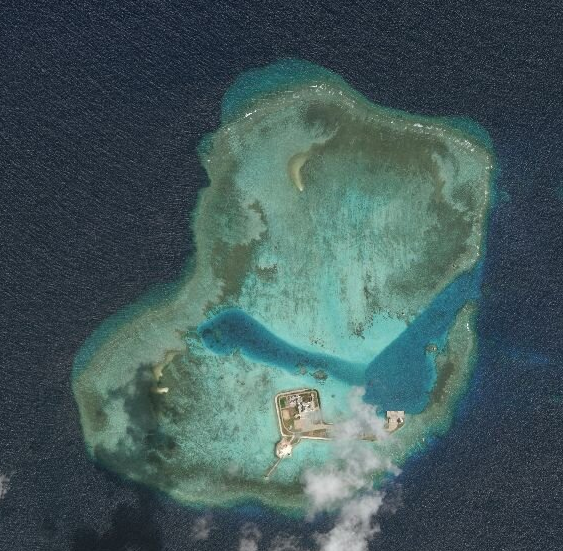
- Hughes Reef

- Location within Spratly Islands
- Other names: 東門礁 / 东门礁 Dōngmén Jiāo (Chinese); Burunyugan Reef 4 (Philippine English); Bahura ng Burunyugan 4 (Filipino) đá Tư Nghĩa (Vietnamese)

Geography
- Location: South China Sea
- Coordinates: 9°55′N 114°30′E
- Archipelago: Spratly Islands

Administration
- China
- Province: Hainan
- City: Sansha

Claimed by
- China
- Philippines
- Taiwan
- Vietnam

Hughes Reef (Mandarin Chinese: 東門礁/东门礁; pinyin: Dōngmén Jiāo, Filipino: Bahura ng Burunyugan 4, Vietnamese: đá Tư Nghĩa) is a reef in Union Banks in the Spratly group of islands, South China Sea claimed by the PRC (China), the ROC (Taiwan), the Philippines, Malaysia, and Vietnam. It is only above water at low tide.

The PRC has reclaimed land on the reef, bringing its area to 7.6 hectares (19 acres), and occupied the reef. The reef has a lighthouse on top of a two storied defence outpost.

== Geographical features ==
On 12 July 2016, the tribunal of the Permanent Court of Arbitration concluded that Hughes Reef is, or in its natural condition was, exposed at low tide and submerged at high tide and, accordingly, its low-tide elevations do not generate an entitlement to a territorial sea, exclusive economic zone or continental shelf.

== Military development ==
In late 2016, photographs emerged which suggested that Hughes Reef has been armed with anti-aircraft weapons and a CIWS missile-defence system.

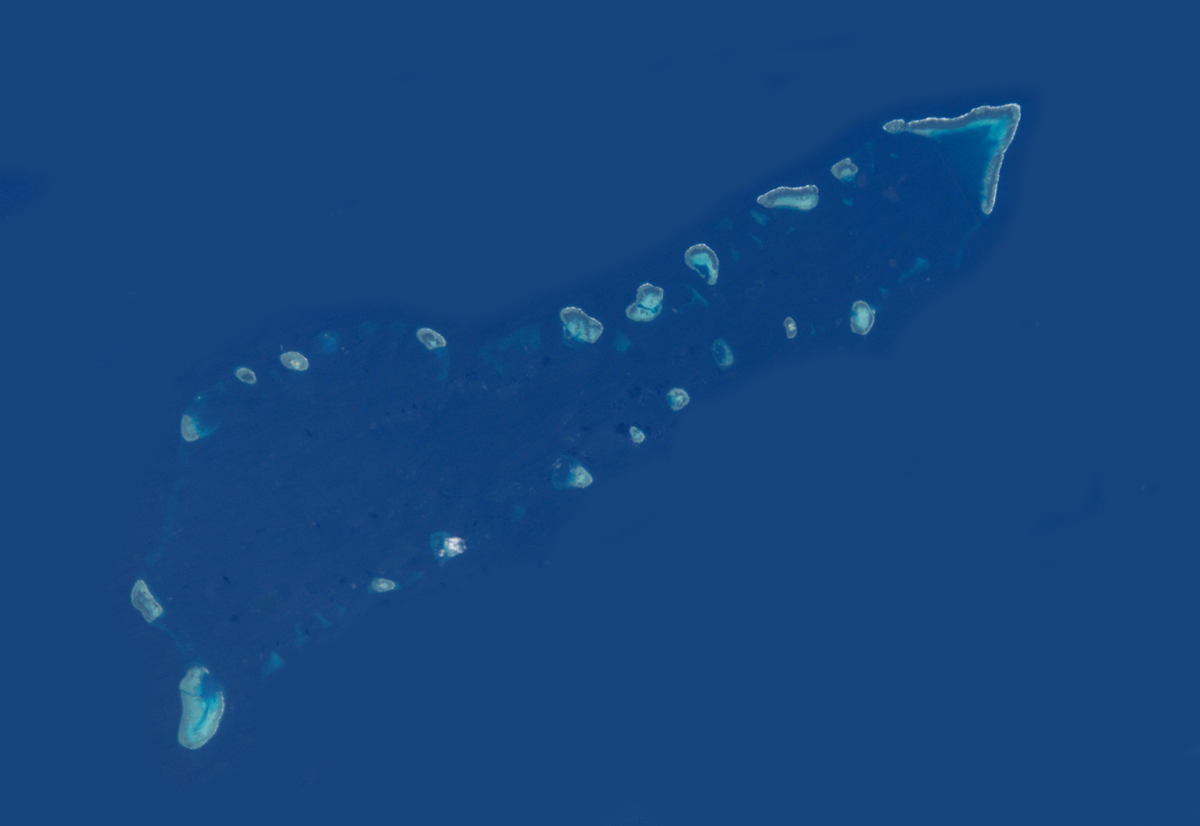

== See also ==
- Great Wall of Sand
- Nine-dotted line
