= Johnson South Reef =

Disputed reef in the South China Sea

Disputed reef
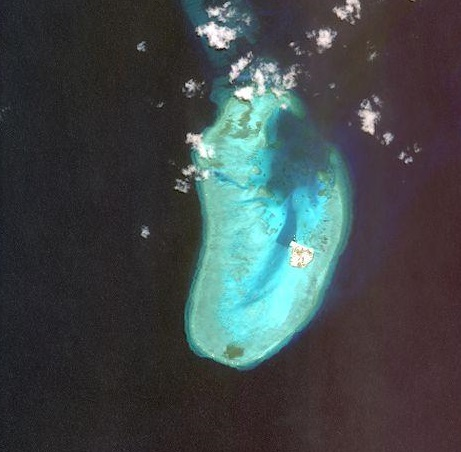
- Johnson South Reef

- Location within Spratly Islands
- Other names: 赤瓜礁 Chìguā Jiāo (Chinese); Mabini Reef (Philippine English); Bahura ng Mabini (Filipino); Đá Gạc Ma (Vietnamese)

Geography
- Location: South China Sea
- Coordinates: 9°43′N 114°17′E
- Archipelago: Spratly Islands

Administration
- China
- Province: Hainan
- Prefecture-leveled City: Sansha
- District: Nansha District

Claimed by
- China
- Philippines
- Taiwan
- Vietnam

Johnson South Reef, also known as Chigua (Chih-kua) Reef (Chinese: 赤瓜礁; pinyin: Chìguā Jiāo; Wade–Giles: Chih-kua chiao), Gạc Ma Reef (Vietnamese: Đá Gạc Ma), or Mabini Reef (Filipino: Bahura ng Mabini, lit. 'Reef of Mabini'), is a reef in the southwest portion of the Union Banks in the Spratly Islands of the South China Sea. It is controlled by the People's Republic of China (PRC), but its ownership is disputed and also claimed by the Philippines, Taiwan (ROC), and Vietnam.

== Location, topography and structures ==
Johnson South Reef lies adjacent to the Vietnamese-controlled Collins Reef (also known as Johnson North Reef) which lies 6.4 kilometres (4.0 mi) to the northwest. It is naturally above water only at low tide. Prior to 2014 it housed a number of small buildings, wharves and a fortified Chinese maritime observation station.

On 12 July 2016, the tribunal of the Permanent Court of Arbitration concluded that Johnson Reef contains, within the meaning of Article 121(1) of the United Nations Convention on the Law of the Sea (UNCLOS), naturally formed areas of land, surrounded by water, which are above water at high tide. However, for purposes of Article 121(3) of UNCLOS, the high-tide features at Johnson Reef are "rocks that cannot sustain human habitation or economic life of their own and accordingly shall be entitled to 12nm of territorial sea measured from its baseline but have no exclusive economic zone or continental shelf".

== Territorial disputes ==
Johnson South Reef has been occupied by the People's Republic of China since 1988, and is claimed by Vietnam. It was the site of the 1988 Johnson South Reef Skirmish between the PRC and Vietnam that resulted in the death of 64 Vietnamese soldiers, two Vietnamese boats being sunk, and the Chinese occupying the reef. The PRC government constructed an embankment building on the reef in the early 1990s.

In July 2012, to further reinforce their claim, a Chinese fleet of 29 fishing vessels from Hainan protected by Yuzheng 310 (a fishery administration patrol ship) spent 20 days fishing in the region.

== Military development ==
During 2014, Chinese reclamation work expanded the usable surface area to 10.9 hectares (27 acres), accommodating what appears to be a military and radar base and a small harbour.

In late 2016, photographs emerged which suggested that the expanded reef has been armed with anti-aircraft guns and a CIWS missile-defence system.

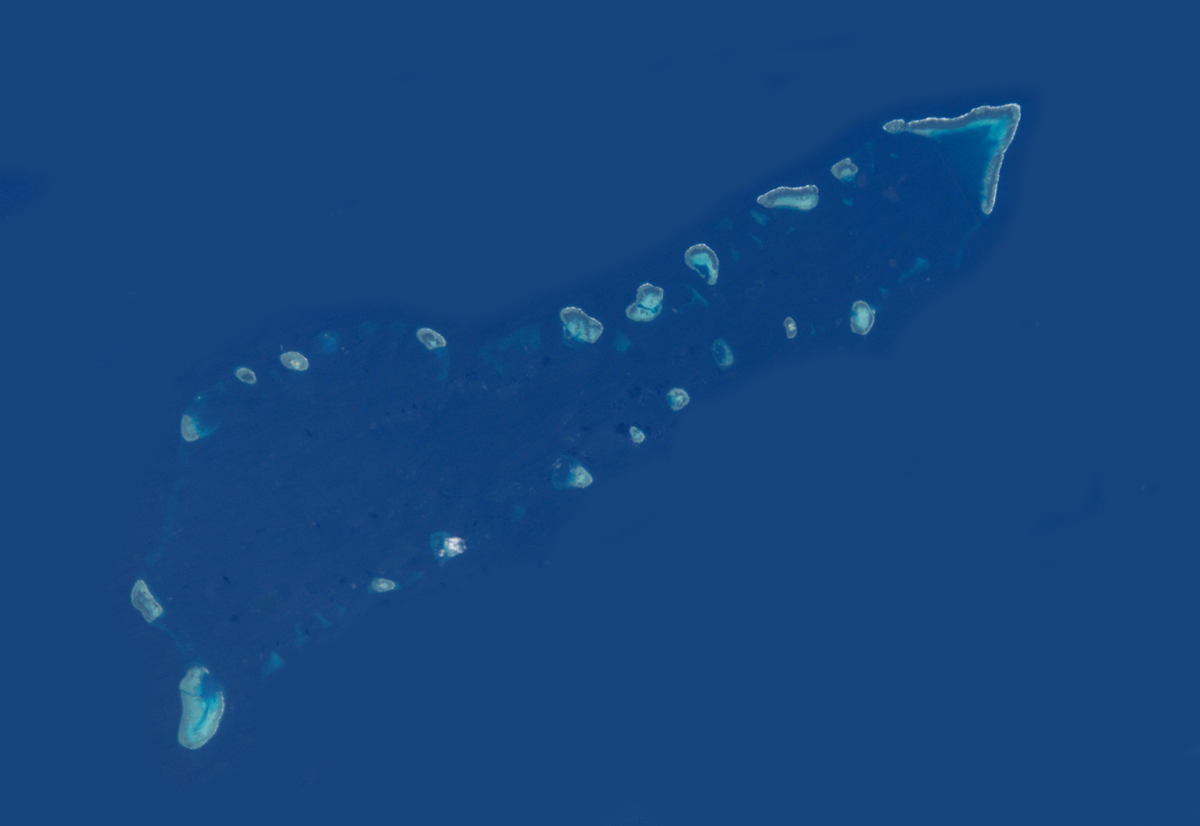

== See also ==
- Great Wall of Sand
- Johnson South Reef Skirmish
- Nine-dotted line
- Sino-Vietnamese conflicts 1979-1990
