= Sin Cowe Island =

In S. China Sea disputed by CHN/PHL/VNM

Disputed island
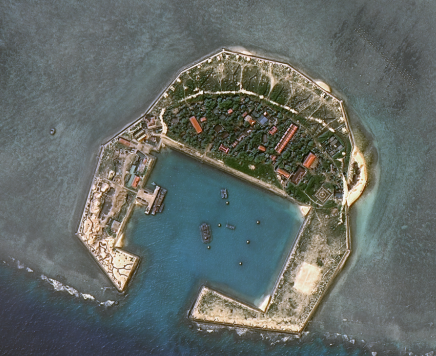
- Sin Cowe Island

- Location within Spratly Islands
- Other names: Sin Cowe Island (English); Đảo Sinh Tồn (Vietnamese); Rurok Island (Philippine English); Pulo ng Rurok (Filipino) 景宏島 Jǐnghóng Dǎo / Ching-hung Tao(Chinese)

Geography
- Location: South China Sea
- Coordinates: 09°53′07″N 114°19′47″E
- Archipelago: Spratly Islands
- Area: 13 ha (32 acres)

Administration
- Vietnam
- District: Trường Sa District, Khánh Hòa
- Commune: Sinh Tồn Commune

Claimed by
- China
- Philippines
- Taiwan
- Vietnam

Demographics
- Population: 31

Sin Cowe Island in the Union Banks

Sin Cowe Island 9°53′7″N 114°19′47″E, also known as Sinh Ton Island (Vietnamese: Đảo Sinh Tồn); Rurok Island (Filipino: Pulo ng Rurok, lit. 'Island of Peak'); (Mandarin Chinese: 景宏島; pinyin: Jǐnghóng Dǎo; Wade–Giles: Ching-hung Tao), is an island in the Spratly Islands in the South China Sea. With an natural area of 8 hectares (20 acres), it is the seventh largest Spratly island and the third largest of those occupied by Vietnam. It has a fringing reef which is above water at low tide.

This island has been controlled by Vietnam since 1974, first by South Vietnam's ARVN Navy, followed by the Navy of the Socialist Republic of Vietnam after 1975. The island is also claimed by China, the Philippines and Taiwan (the Republic of China). In December 1960, the United States Military Assistance Advisory Group requested permission from Taiwan's Republic of China Ministry of National Defense to carry out surveys at this island, which was approved.

It is part of the Union Banks. According to reports for 2025, Vietnam expanded the island to 13 hectares with land reclaimed from the sea.

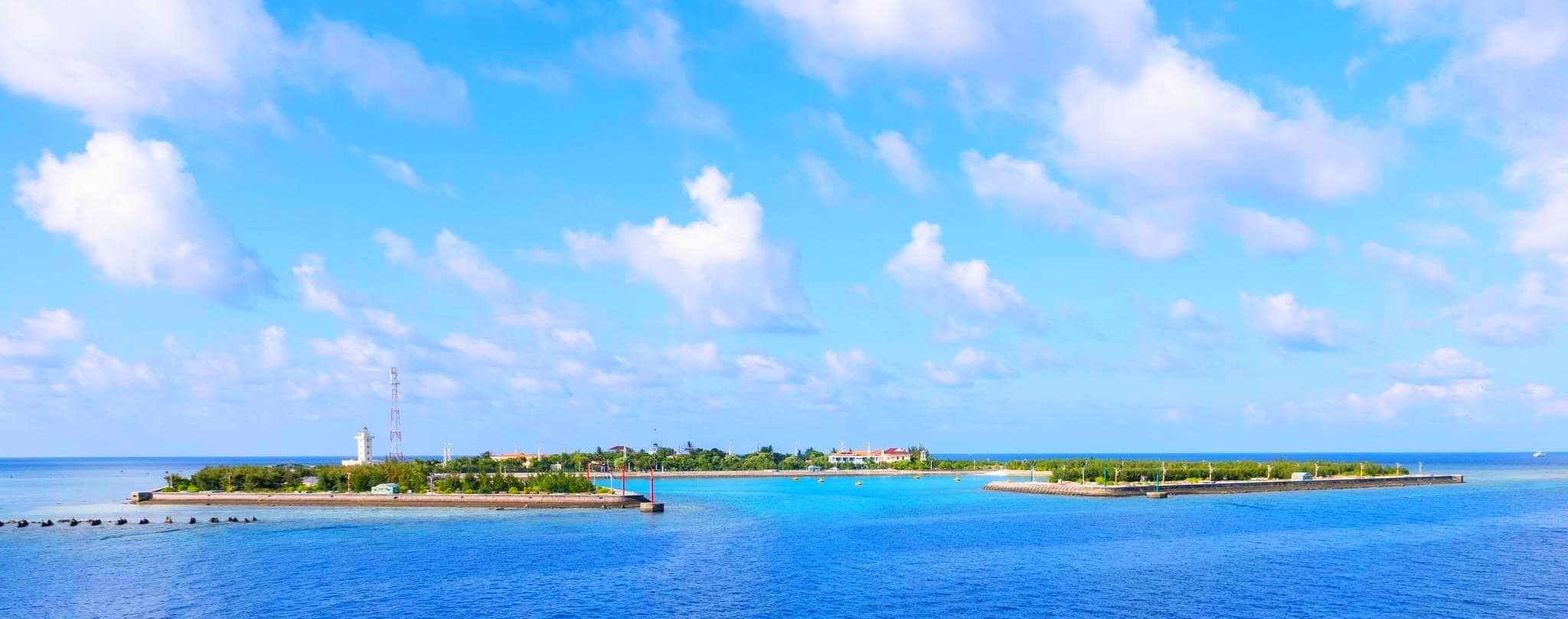
Sin Cowe Island, viewed from the south.

== Topography and Structures ==
Sin Cowe island is garrisoned by Vietnamese soldiers. The structures on it include a two-storied government building, anti aircraft guns, artillery and a Vietnamese Sovereignty marker.

There is also a civilian population with a school, children's playground, medical station and wind turbines for electricity generation.

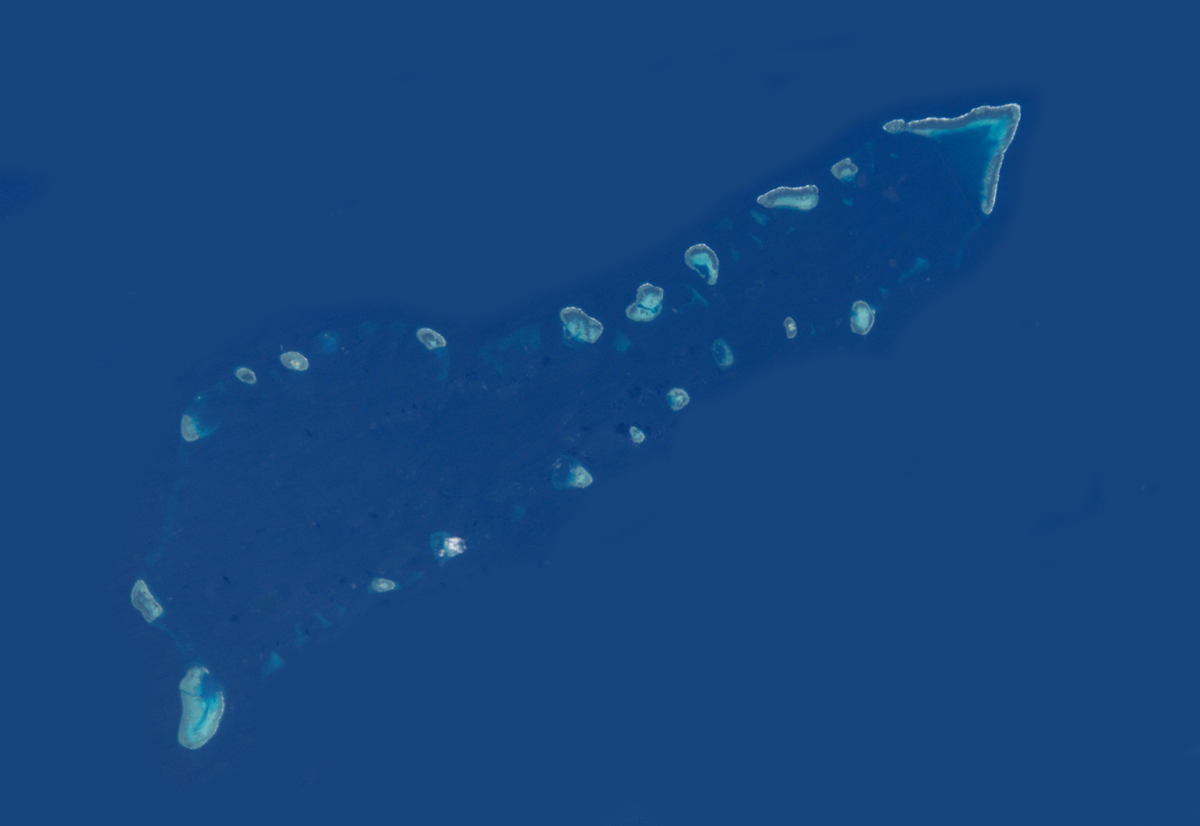

== See also ==
- Spratly Islands dispute
