= Union Banks =

Map of Union Banks

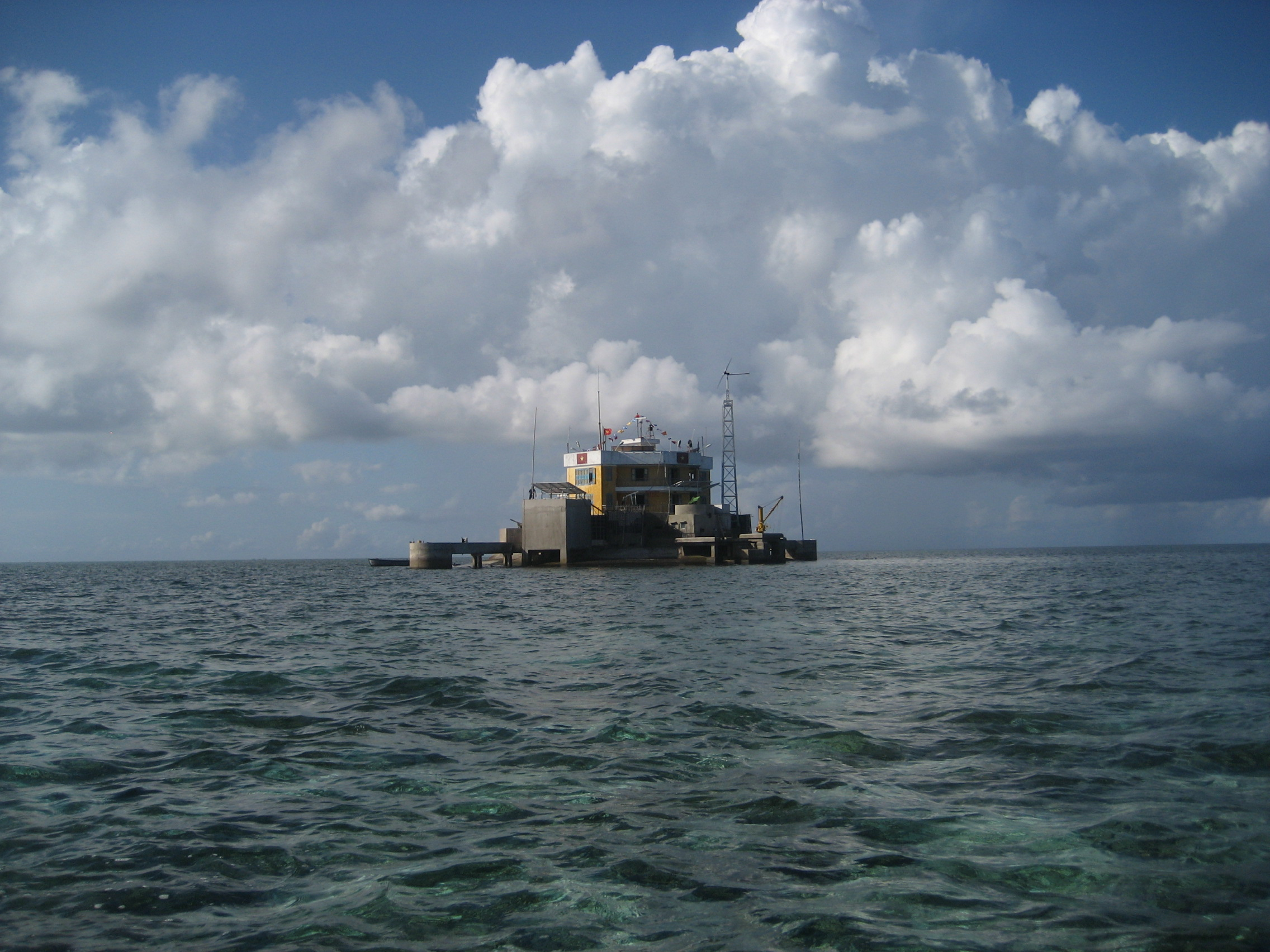
Vietnamese structure on Collins Reef (Đá Cô Lin)

Union Banks (Filipino: Pampang ng Pagkakaisa; Vietnamese: Cụm Sinh Tồn; Chinese: 九章群礁; pinyin: Jiǔzhāng Qúnjiāo) is a large drowned atoll in the center of Dangerous Ground in the Spratly Islands in South China Sea, 230 kilometres (120 nautical miles) west of the Philippine coast, containing islands and reefs whose ownership remains disputed and controversial. The closest atoll is Tizard Bank, 25 kilometres (13 nautical miles) due north of Union Banks. There are only two natural islands on the rim of the reef, Sin Cowe Island and Sin Cowe East Island.

The atoll is 55 kilometres (34 miles) long from Johnson South Reef in the southwest to Whitson Reef in the northeast, and up to 15 kilometres (9.3 miles) wide. Its total area measures 461 square kilometres (178 square miles). The central lagoon is up to 53 metres (174 feet) deep.

== Islands and reefs comprising Union Banks ==
Union Banks consists of the following islands and reefs, clockwise starting in the southwest corner:

Key: yellow = occupied by PRC; violet = occupied by Vietnam

Feature	Location
Johnson South Reef (Chìguā Jiāo) (Mabini Reef) (Đá Gạc Ma)	09°43′9″N 114°16′57″E
Collins Reef/Johnson North Reef (Guǐhǎn Jiāo) (Roxas Reef) (Đá Cô Lin)	09°46′14″N 114°15′27″E
Đá Tam Trung	09°50′12″N 114°16′6″E
Loveless Reef (Huá Jiāo) (Burunyugan 7 Reef) (Đá Nghĩa Hành)	09°51′13″N 114°16′47″E*
Gent Reef (Jíyáng Jiāo) (Burunyugan 6 Reef) (Đá Sơn Hà)	09°52′45″N 114°18′21″E
Sin Cowe Island/Sinh Ton Island (Jǐnghóng Dǎo) (Rurok Island) (Ching-hung Tao) (Đảo Sinh Tồn)	09°53′9″N 114°19′46″E
Edmund Reef (Nánmén Jiāo) (Burunyugan 5 Reef) (Đá Bình Khê)	09°53′48″N 114°23′40″E*
McKennan Reef/Kennan Reef (Xīmén Jiāo) (Chigua Reef) (Đá Ken Nan)	09°54′12″N 114°27′56″E
Đá Bia	09°53′42″N 114°29′40″E
Hughes Reef (Dōngmén Jiāo) (Tung-men Chiao) (Burunyugan 4 Reef) (Đá Tư Nghĩa)	09°54′51″N 114°29′45″E
Hallet Reef (Ānlè Jiāo) (Burunyugan 3 Reef) (Đá Bình Sơn)	09°55′55″N 114°31′25″E*
Holiday Reef (Chángxiàn Jiāo) (Burunyugan 2 Reef) (Đá Bãi Khung)	09°57′55″N 114°33′53″E
Empire Reef (Zhǔquán Jiāo) (Burunyugan 1 Reef) (Đá Đức Hòa)	09°58′44″N 114°35′23″E*
Whitsun Reef/Whitson Reef (Niúè Jiāo) (Julian Felipe Reef) (Đá Ba Đầu)	10°00′10″N 114°39′58″E
Ross Reef (Rǎnqīngdōng Jiāo) (Burunyugan 15 Reef) (Đá An Bình)	09°54′25″N 114°35′52″E
Grierson Reef/Sin Cowe East Island (Rǎnqīng Shāzhōu) (Jan-ch'ing Chiao) (Burunyugan 14 Reef) (Đảo Sinh Tồn Đông)	09°54′8.2″N 114°33′50.7″E
Bamford Reef (Lóngxiā Jiāo) (Burunyugan 13 Reef) (Đá Vị Khê)	09°53′25″N 114°32′7″E
Tetley Reef (Biǎncān Jiāo) (Burunyugan 12 Reef) (Đá Ninh Hòa)	09°52′5″N 114°30′39″E
[Unnamed reef] (Burunyugan 11 Reef)	09°51′5″N 114°29′29″E
Jones Reef (Zhāngxī Jiāo) (Burunyugan 10 Reef) (Đá Văn Nguyên)	09°49′47″N 114°27′57″E
Higgens Reef/Higgen Reef (Qūyuán Jiāo) (Burunyugan 9 Reef) (Đá Phúc Sĩ)	09°48′49″N 114°24′12″E
Lansdowne Reef (Qióng Jiāo) (Burunyugan 8 Reef) (Chi'ung Chiao) (Đá Len Đao)	09°46′43″N 114°22′14″E

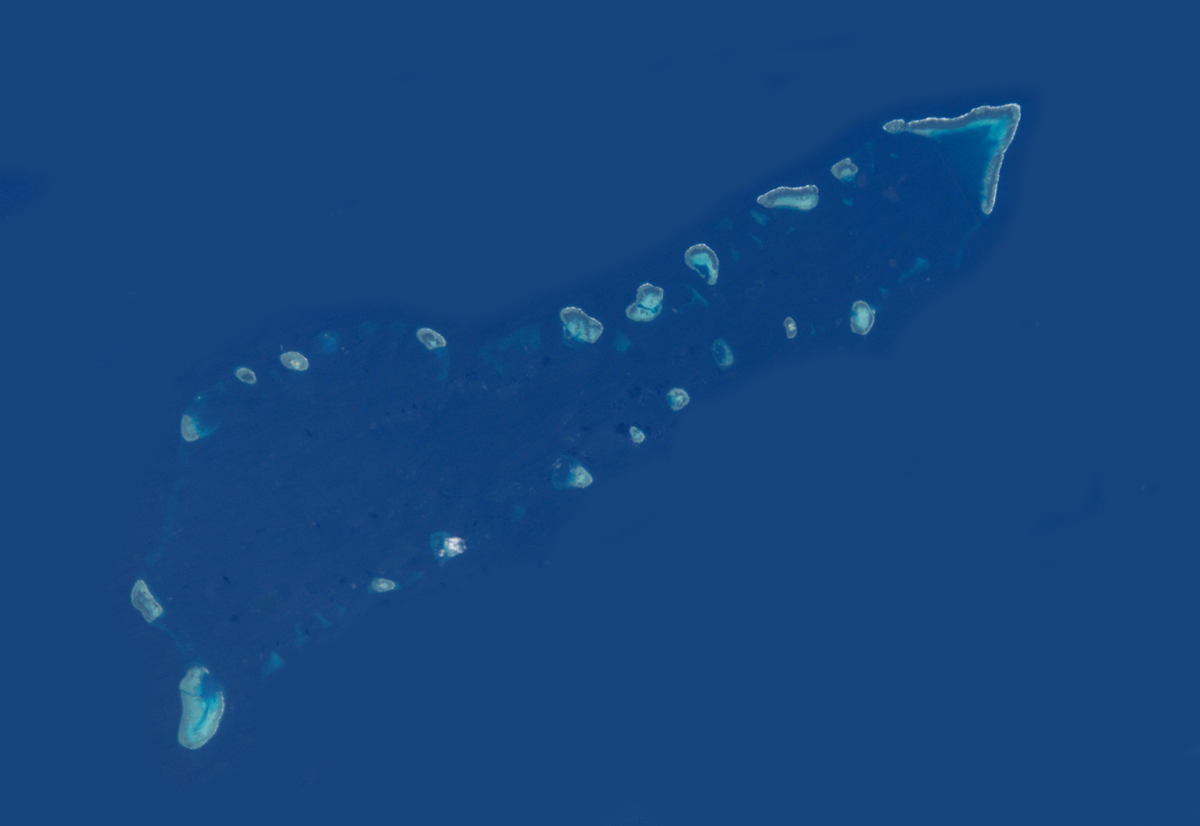

== See also ==
- List of maritime features in the Spratly Islands
