= Collins Reef =

Reef in the South China Sea

Disputed reef
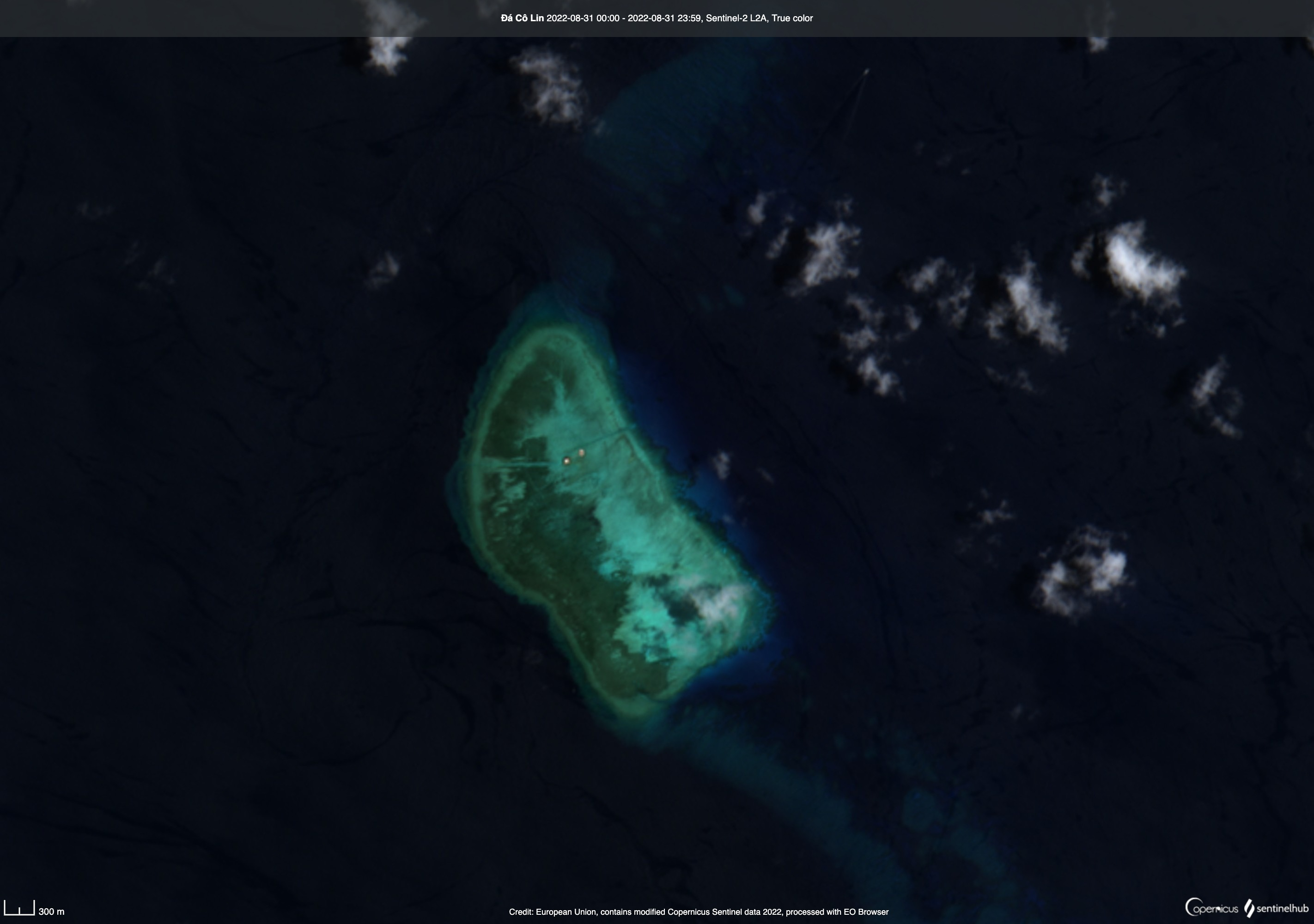
- Collins Reef

- Location within Spratly Islands
- Other names: Johnson North Reef; Đá Cô Lin (Vietnamese); Roxas Reef (Philippine English); Bahura ng Roxas (Filipino) 鬼喊礁 Guǐhǎn Jiāo (Chinese)

Geography
- Location: South China Sea
- Coordinates: 09°46′26″N 114°15′20″E
- Archipelago: Spratly Islands

Administration
- Vietnam
- District: Trường Sa District
- Commune: Sinh Tồn Commune

Claimed by
- China
- Philippines
- Taiwan
- Vietnam

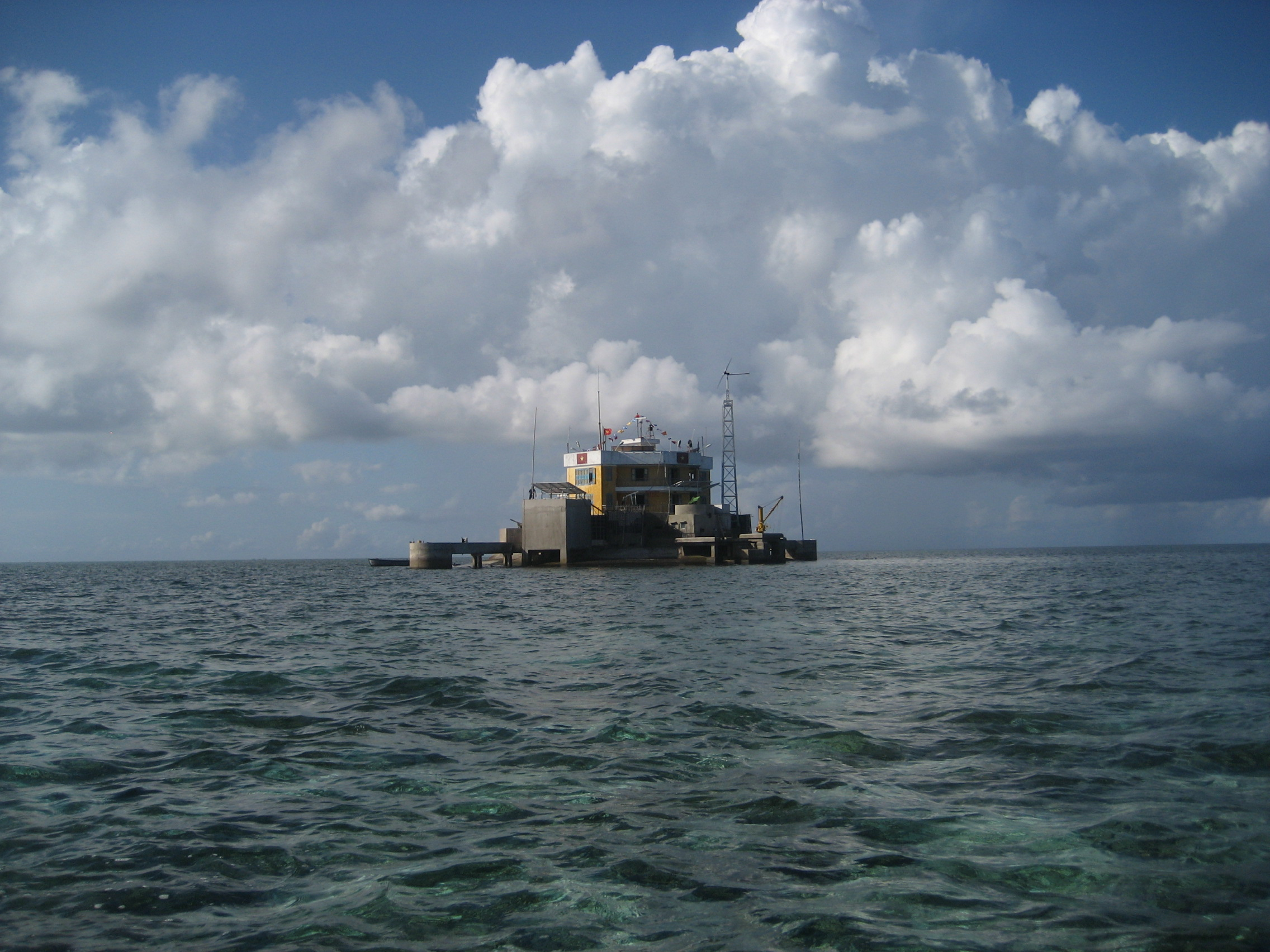
Vietnamese structure on Collins Reef

Map of the Union Banks

Collins Reef, also known as Johnson North Reef/Johnson Reef North; Vietnamese: Đá Cô Lin; Roxas Reef (Filipino: Bahura ng Roxas); Mandarin Chinese: 鬼喊礁; pinyin: Guǐhǎn Jiāo, is a Vietnamese occupied and controlled reef and the westernmost feature of Union Banks Atoll near the centre of Dangerous Ground in the Spratly islands in the South China Sea. It is also claimed by China (PRC), Taiwan (ROC), and the Philippines.

== Location ==
Collins Reef lies at 9°46′26″N 114°15′20″E (9.7738889°N 114.2555556°E), to the northwest of Johnson South Reef, at the southwestern corner of the Union Banks.

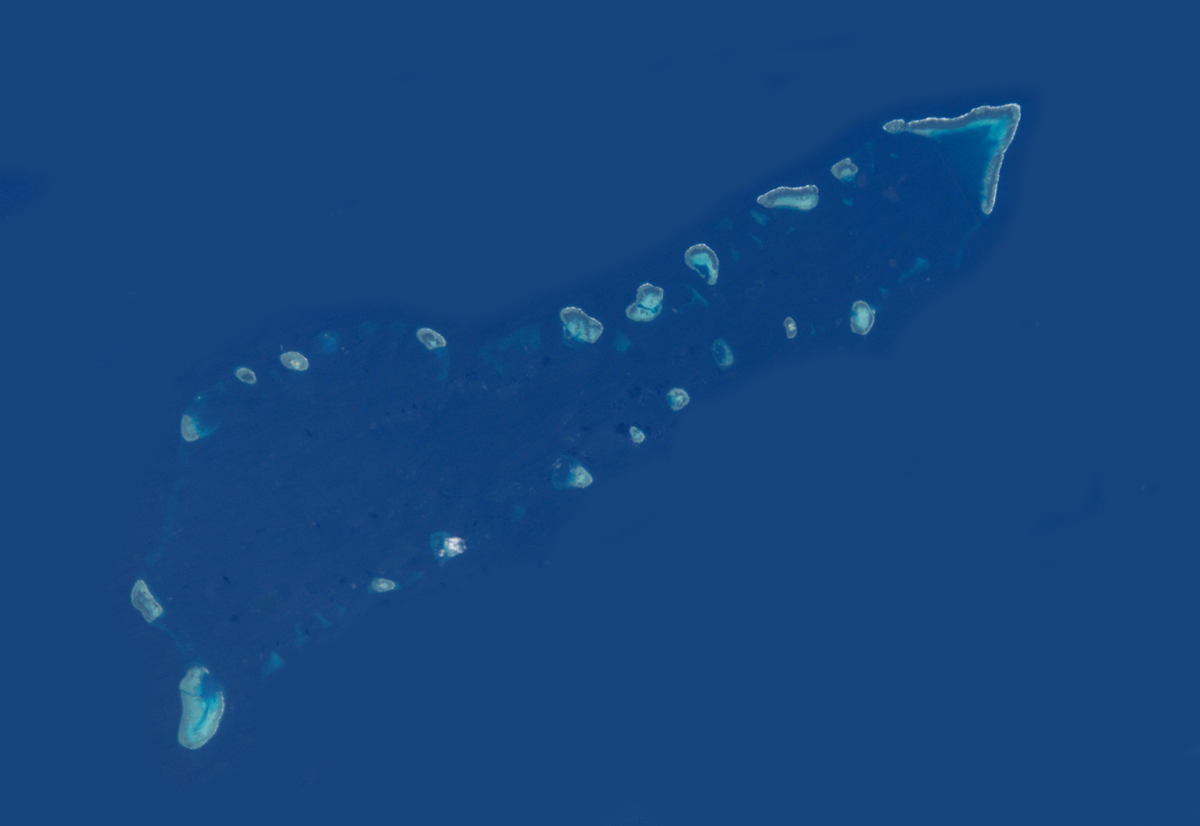
