= Spratly Islands =

Disputed archipelago in the South China Sea

The Spratly Islands (Filipino: Kapuluang Spratly; simplified Chinese: 南沙群岛; traditional Chinese: 南沙群島; pinyin: Nánshā Qúndǎo; Malay: Kepulauan Spratly; Vietnamese: Quần đảo Trường Sa) are a disputed archipelago in the South China Sea. Composed of islands, islets, cays, and more than 100 reefs, sometimes grouped in submerged old atolls, the archipelago lies off the coasts of the Philippines, Malaysia, and southern Vietnam. Named after the 19th-century British whaling captain Richard Spratly who sighted Spratly Island in 1843, the islands contain less than 200 ha (500 acres) of naturally occurring land area that is spread over hundreds of square kilometers of the South China Sea.

The Spratly Islands are one of the major archipelagos in the South China Sea which complicate governance and economics in this part of Southeast Asia due to their location in strategic shipping lanes. The islands are largely uninhabited, but offer rich fishing grounds and may contain significant oil and natural gas reserves, and as such are important to the claimants in their attempts to establish international boundaries. Some of the islands have civilian settlements, but of the approximately 45 islands, cays, reefs and shoals that are occupied, all contain structures that are occupied by military forces from Malaysia, China (PRC), Taiwan (ROC), the Philippines, and Vietnam. Additionally, Brunei has claimed an exclusive economic zone in the southeastern part of the Spratly Islands, which includes the uninhabited Louisa Reef.

== Geographic and economic overview ==
Spratly Islands
Disputed islands
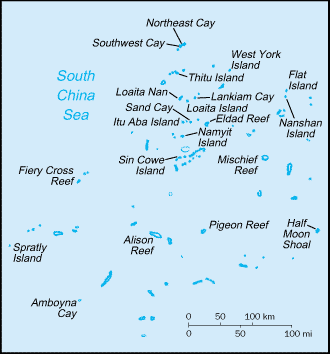
- The Spratly Islands
- Interactive map of Spratly Islands

Geography
- Location: South China Sea
- Coordinates: 10°N 114°E
- Total islands: 18 islands and cays
- Major islands: Itu Aba Island; Thitu Island; West York Island; Spratly Island; Northeast Cay; Southwest Cay; Sin Cowe Island
- Area: 200 ha (490 acres)
- Coastline: 926 km (575.4 mi)
- Highest elevation: 4 m (13 ft)
- Highest point: Southwest Cay

Claimed by
- Brunei
- EEZ: Brunei zone
- People's Republic of China
- District: Nansha, Sansha, Hainan
- Malaysia
- State: Sabah
- Philippines
- Municipality: Kalayaan, Palawan
- Republic of China (Taiwan)
- Municipality: Kaohsiung
- Vietnam
- Special administrative zone: Trường Sa, Khánh Hòa

Spratly Islands

Chinese name
- Traditional Chinese: 南沙群島
- Simplified Chinese: 南沙群岛
Transcriptions
Standard Mandarin
- Hanyu Pinyin: Nánshā Qúndǎo
Yue: Cantonese
- Yale Romanization: Nàhmsaa Kwùhndóu
- Jyutping: nam4 saa1 kwun4 dou2
Southern Min
- Hokkien POJ: Lâm-soa Kûn-tó
- Hainanese Romanization: Nâm-so Kún-tō

Vietnamese name
- Vietnamese: Quần đảo Trường Sa
- Hán-Nôm: 群島長沙

Malay name
- Malay: Kepulauan Spratly; Gugusan Semarang Peninjau

Filipino name
- Tagalog: Kapuluan ng Kalayaan

The Spratly Islands

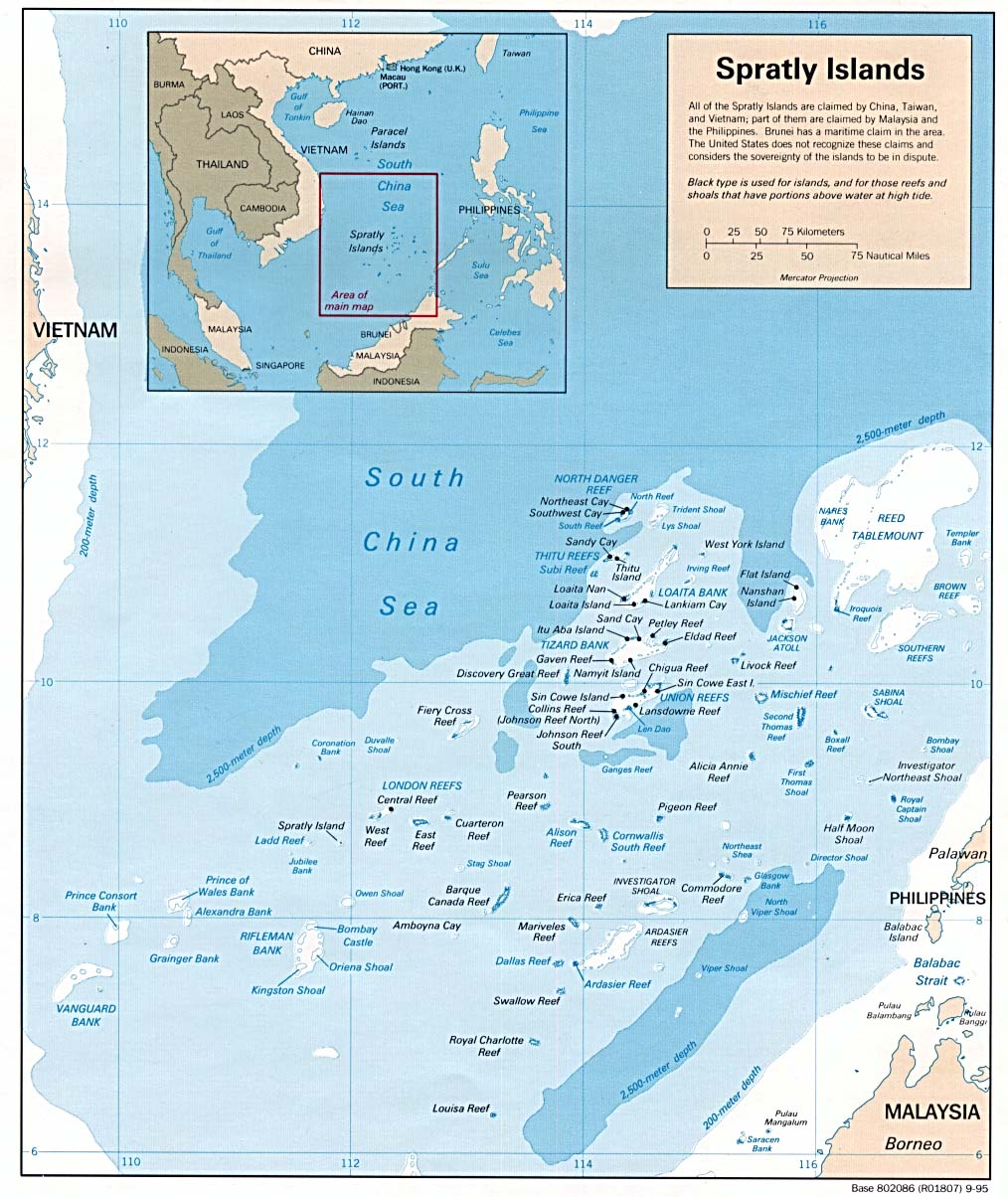
A geographic map of Spratly Islands (Note: Black type is used for islands, and for those reefs and shoals that have portions above water at high tide. Blue type is used for submerged features. Erratum: Hughes Reef is wrongly labelled Chigua Reef, a name of Johnson South Reef in Chinese, part of the same Union Banks sunken atoll.)

In 1939, the Spratly Islands were coral islets mostly inhabited by seabirds. Despite the Spratly Islands naturally consisting of 19 islands (see below), according to a Chinese 1986 source, the Spratly Islands consist of 14 islands or islets, 6 banks, 113 submerged reefs, 35 underwater banks and 21 underwater shoals.

The islands are all of similar nature; they are cays (or keys): sand islands formed on old degraded and submerged coral reefs. The northeast part of the Spratly Islands is known as Dangerous Ground and is characterised by many low islands, sunken reefs, and degraded, sunken atolls with coral often rising abruptly from ocean depths greater than 1,000 m (3,000 ft) — all of which makes the area dangerous for navigation.

The Spratly Islands contain almost no arable land, are largely uninhabited, and very few of the islands have a permanent drinkable water supply.

Natural resources include fish, guano, oil and natural gas. Economic activity has included commercial fishing, shipping, guano mining, oil and gas exploitation, and more recently, tourism. The Spratly Islands are located near several primary shipping lanes.

The islands and cays, listed in descending order of naturally occurring area, are:

| # | Island name | in Atoll | Area (ha.) | Location | Currently occupied by | Reclaimed area |
|---|---|---|---|---|---|---|
| 1 | Itu Aba Island | Tizard Bank | 46.00 | 10°23′N 114°21′E | Taiwan (Taiping Island) | ~6 ha |
| 2 | Thitu Island | Thitu Reefs | 37.20 | 11°03′N 114°17′E | Philippines (Pagasa Island) | |
| 3 | West York Island | West York Island | 18.60 | 11°05′N 115°01′E | Philippines (Likas Island) | |
| 4 | Spratly Island | Spratly Island | 13.00 | 08°38′N 111°55′E | Vietnam (Trường Sa Island) | |
| 5 | Northeast Cay | North Danger Reef | 12.70 | 11°28′N 114°21′E | Philippines (Parola Island) | |
| 6 | Southwest Cay | North Danger Reef | 12.00 | 11°26′N 114°20′E | Vietnam (Song Tử Tây Island) | ~8 ha |
| 7 | Sin Cowe Island | Union Banks | 08.00 | 09°52′N 114°19′E | Vietnam (Sinh Tồn Island) | ~1 ha |
| 8 | Nanshan Island | Nanshan Group | 07.93 | 10°45′N 115°49′E | Philippines (Lawak Island) | |
| 9 | Sand Cay | Tizard Bank | 07.00 | 10°23′N 114°28′E | Vietnam (Sơn Ca Island) | ~2.1 ha |
| 10 | Loaita Island | Loaita Bank | 06.45 | 10°40′N 114°25′E | Philippines (Kota Island) | |
| 11 | Swallow Reef | Swallow Reef | 06.20 | 07°22′N 113°50′E | Malaysia (Layang-Layang Reef) | |
| 12 | Namyit Island | Tizard Bank | 05.30 | 10°11′N 114°22′E | Vietnam (Nam Yết Island) | |
| 13 | Amboyna Cay | Amboyna Cay | 01.60 | 07°51′N 112°55′E | Vietnam (An Bang Island) | |
| 14 | Grierson Reef | Union Banks | 01.60 | 09°51′N 114°29′E | Vietnam (Sinh Tồn Đông Island) | |
| 15 | West London Reef | London Reefs | 01.10 | 08°52′N 112°15′E | Vietnam (Đá Tây A Island) | |
| 16 | Central London Reef | London Reefs | 00.88 | 08°56′N 112°21′E | Vietnam (Trường Sa Đông Island) | |
| 17 | Flat Island | Nanshan Group | 00.57 | 10°49′N 115°49′E | Philippines (Patag Island) | |
| 18 | Lankiam Cay | Loaita Bank | 00.44 | 10°43′N 114°32′E | Philippines (Panata Island) | |

The total area of the archipelago's naturally occurring islands is 177 ha (440 acres) and 200 ha (490 acres) with reclaimed land.

Confusingly, the Spratly Islands at times were also referred to as the Paracels.

== Geology ==
The Spratly Islands consist of islands, reefs, banks and shoals made up of biogenic carbonate. These accumulations of biogenic carbonate lie upon the higher crests of major submarine ridges that are uplifted fault blocks known by geologists as horsts. These horsts are part of a series of half-grabens and rotated fault-blocks which lie parallel and en echelon. The long axes of the horsts, rotated fault blocks and half-grabens form well-defined linear trends that lie parallel to magnetic anomalies exhibited by the oceanic crust of the adjacent South China Sea. The horsts, rotated fault blocks, and the rock forming the bottoms of associated grabens consist of stretched and subsided continental crust that is composed of Triassic, Jurassic, and Cretaceous strata that include calc-alkalic extrusive igneous rocks, intermediate to acid intrusive igneous rocks, sandstones, siltstones, dark-green claystones, and metamorphic rocks that include biotite–muscovite–feldspar–quartz migmatites and garnet–mica schists.

The dismemberment and subsidence of continental crust into horsts, rotated fault blocks and half-grabens that underlie the Spratly Islands and surrounding sea bottom occurred in two distinct periods. They occurred as the result of the tectonic stretching of continental crust along underlying deeply rooted detachment faults. During the Late Cretaceous and Early Oligocene, the earliest period of tectonic stretching of continental crust and formation of horsts, half-grabens, and rotated fault-blocks occurred in association with the rifting and later sea-floor spreading that created the South China Sea. During the Late Oligocene-Early Miocene additional stretching and block faulting of continental crust occurred within the Spratly Islands and adjacent Dangerous Ground. During and after this period of tectonic activity, corals and other marine life colonised the crests of the horsts and other ridges that lay in shallow water. The remains of these organisms accumulated over time as biogenic carbonates that comprise the current day reefs, shoals and cays of the Spratly Islands. Starting with their formation in Late Cretaceous, fine-grained organic-rich marine sediments accumulated within the numerous submarine half-grabens that underlie sea bottom within the Dangerous Ground region.

The geological surveys show localised areas within the Spratly Islands region are favourable for the accumulation of economic oil and gas reserves. They include thick sequences of Cenozoic sediments east of the Spratly Islands. Southeast and west of them, there also exist thick accumulations of sediments that possibly might contain economic oil and gas reserves, which lie closer to the Spratly Islands.

== Ecology ==
In some cays in the Spratly Islands, the sand and pebble sediments form the beaches and spits around the island. Under the influence of the dominant wind direction, which changes seasonally, these sediments move around the island to change the shape and size of the island. For example, Spratly Island is larger during the northeast monsoon (about 700 by 300 metres (2,300 ft × 980 ft)), and smaller during the southwest monsoon (approximately 650 m × 320 m (2,130 ft × 1,050 ft)).

Some islands may contain fresh groundwater fed by rain. Groundwater levels fluctuate during the day with the rhythm of the tides.

Phosphates guano (bird faeces) are mainly concentrated in the beach rocks by the way of exchange-endosmosis. The principal minerals bearing phosphate are podolite, lewistonite and dehonite.

=== Coral reefs ===
Coral reefs are the predominant structures of these islands; the Spratly group contains over 600 coral reefs in total. In April 2015 The New York Times reported that China were using "scores of dredgers" to convert Fiery Cross Reef and several other reefs into military facilities.

=== Vegetation ===
Little vegetation grows on these islands, which are subject to intense monsoons. Larger islands are capable of supporting tropical forest, scrub forest, coastal scrub and grasses. It is difficult to determine which species have been introduced or cultivated by humans. Taiping Island (Itu Aba) was reportedly covered with shrubs, coconut, and mangroves in 1938; pineapple was also cultivated there when it was profitable. Other accounts mention papaya, banana, palm, and even white peach trees growing on one island. A few islands that have been developed as small tourist resorts had soil and trees brought in and planted where there was none.

=== Wildlife ===
A total of 2,927 marine species have been recorded in the Spratly Sea, including 776 benthic species, 382 species of hard coral, 524 species of marine fish, 262 species of algae and sea grass, 35 species of seabirds, and 20 species of marine mammals and sea turtles. Terrestrial vegetation in the islands includes 103 species of vascular plants of magnolia branches (Magnoliophyta) of 39 families and 79 genera. The islands that do have vegetation provide important habitats for many seabirds and sea turtles. Both the green turtle (Chelonia mydas, endangered) and the hawksbill turtle (Eretmochelys imbricata, critically endangered) formerly occurred in numbers sufficient to support commercial exploitation. These species reportedly continue to nest even on islands inhabited by military personnel (such as Pratas Island) to some extent, though it is believed that their numbers have declined.

Seabirds use the islands as resting, breeding, and wintering sites. Species found here include streaked shearwater (Calonectris leucomelas), brown booby (Sula leucogaster), red-footed booby (S. sula), great crested tern (Sterna bergii), and white tern (Gygis alba). Little information is available regarding the current status of the islands' seabird populations, though it is likely that birds may divert nesting sites to smaller, less disturbed islands. Bird eggs cover the majority of Southwest Cay, a small island in the eastern Danger Zone. A variety of cetaceans such as dolphins, orcas, pilot whales, and sperm whales are also present around the islands.

This ecoregion is still largely a mystery. Scientists have focused their research on the marine environment, while the ecology of the terrestrial environment remains relatively unknown.

=== Ecological hazards ===
Location of the major islands in Spratly Islands. The eastern Dangerous Ground area contains many other reefs.
- Legend:
- Republic of China (Taiwan): 1: Taiping 2: Zhongzhou
- China: 3: Yongshu 4: Meiji 5: Zhubi 6: Huayang 7: Nanxun 8: Chiguo 9: Dongmen
- Philippines: 10: Flat Island 11: Lankiam Cay 12: Loaita Cay 13: Loaita Island 14: Nanshan Island 15: Northeast Cay 16: Thitu Island 17: West York Island 18: Commodore Reef 19: Irving Reef 20: Second Thomas Shoal
- Vietnam: 21: Southwest Cay 22: Sand Cay 23: Namyit Island 24: Sin Cowe Island 25: Spratly Island 26: Amboyna Cay 27: Grierson Reef 28: Central London Reef 29: Pearson Reef 30: Barque Canada Reef 31: West London Reef 32: Ladd Reef 33: Discovery Great Reef 34: Pigeon Reef 35: East London Reef 36: Alison Reef 37: Cornwallis South Reef 38: Petley Reef 39: South Reef 40: Collins Reef 41: Lansdowne Reef 42: Bombay Castle 43: Prince of Wales Bank 44: Vanguard Bank 45: Prince Consort Bank 46: Grainger Bank 47: Alexandra Bank 48: Orleana Shoal 49: Kingston Shoal
- Malaysia: 50: Swallow Reef 51: Ardasier Reef 52: Dallas Reef 53: Erica Reef 54: Investigator Shoal 55: Mariveles Reef
- Brunei: 56: Louisa Reef

Political instability, tourism, and the increasing industrialisation of neighbouring countries has led to serious disruption of native flora and fauna, over-exploitation of natural resources, and environmental pollution. Disruption of nesting areas by human activity and/or by introduced animals, such as dogs, has reduced the number of turtles nesting on the islands. Sea turtles are also slaughtered for food on a significant scale. The sea turtle is a symbol of longevity in Chinese culture and at times the military personnel are given orders to protect the turtles.

Heavy commercial fishing in the region incurs other problems. Although it has been outlawed, fishing methods continue to include the use of bottom trawlers fitted with chain rollers. In 1994, a routine patrol by Taiwan's marine navy confiscated more than 200 kg (400 lb) of potassium cyanide solution from fishermen who had been using it for cyanide fishing. These activities have a devastating impact on local marine organisms and coral reefs.

Some interest has been taken in regard to conservation of these island ecosystems. J.W. McManus, professor of marine biology and ecology at the University of Miami's Rosenstiel School of Marine, Atmospheric, and Earth Science School, has explored the possibilities of designating portions of the Spratly Islands as a marine park. One region of the Spratly Archipelago, named Truong Sa, was proposed by Vietnam's Ministry of Science, Technology, and the Environment (MOSTE) as a future protected area. The site, with an area of 160 km^{2} (62 sq mi), is currently managed by the Khánh Hòa Provincial People's Committee of Vietnam.

Military groups in the Spratly Islands have engaged in environmentally damaging activities such as shooting turtles and seabirds, raiding nests and fishing with explosives. The collection of rare medicinal plants, collecting of wood, and hunting for the wildlife trade are common threats to the biodiversity of the entire region, including these islands. Coral habitats are threatened by pollution, over-exploitation of fish and invertebrates, and the use of explosives and poisons as fishing techniques.

A 2014 United Nations Environment Programme (UNEP) report stated, "Sand is rarer than one thinks".

The average price of sand imported by Singapore was US$3 per tonne from 1995 to 2001, but the price increased to US$190 per tonne from 2003 to 2005. Although the Philippines and China had both ratified the UNCLOS III, in the case of and Johnson South Reef, Hughes Reef, Mischief Reef, the PRC dredged sand for free in the EEZ the Philippines had claimed from 1978 arguing this is the "waters of China's Nansha Islands".

Although the consequences of substrate mining are hidden, they are tremendous. Aggregate particles that are too fine to be used are rejected by dredging boats, releasing vast dust plumes and changing water turbidity.

John McManus, a professor of marine biology and ecology at the University of Miami's Rosenstiel School of Marine, Atmospheric, and Earth Science, said, "The worst thing anyone can do to a coral reef is to bury it under tons of sand and gravel ... There are global security concerns associated with the damage. It is likely broad enough to reduce fish stocks in the world's most fish-dependent region." He explained that the reason the world has heard little about the damage inflicted by the People's Republic of China to the reefs is that the experts can't get to them and noted "I have colleagues from the Philippines, Taiwan, PRC, Vietnam and Malaysia who have worked in the Spratly area. Most would not be able to get near the artificial islands except possibly some from PRC, and those would not be able to release their findings."

== History ==
The earliest evidence of human presence in the nearby region, dating back nearly 50,000 years, has been found in the Tabon Caves on Palawan in the Philippine islands. By 2,000 BC, the maritime jade road, an advanced and extensive sea-based trade network, was established by the animist indigenous Austronesian peoples of the Philippines and Taiwan. The trade network later expanded to include states in what is now Brunei, Malaysia, Singapore, Thailand, Indonesia, Cambodia, and Vietnam. Between 600 BC to 3 BC there was an east to west migration by members of the seafaring Sa Huỳnh culture, who, like the earlier Austronesians who came before them, may have passed through the Spratly Islands on their way to Vietnam. These migrants were the forebears of the Cham people, an Austronesian-speaking people that founded the Old Champa kingdom in mainland Southeast Asia.

=== Early records and cartography ===
In the Song Dynasty work Zhu fan zhi by Zhao Rugua, the name "Thousand Li Stretch of Sands" (Qianli Changsha, 千里長沙) and the "Ten-Thousand Li of Stone Pools/Beds" (Wanli Shitang 萬里石塘, or Wanli Shichuang 萬里石床) were given, interpreted by some to refer to Paracel and Spratly respectively.

Wanli Shitang is also recorded in the History of Yuan to have been explored by the Chinese during the Mongol-led Yuan dynasty and may have been considered by them to have been within their national boundaries. However, the Yuan also ruled over Korea, Outer Mongolia, and parts of modern Russia. They are also referenced, sometimes with different names, in the Ming dynasty.

For example, in the Mao Kun map dating from Zheng He's voyage of the early 15th century, Shixing Shitang (石星石塘) is taken by some to mean Spratly, however different authors interpret the identities of these islands differently. Another Ming text, Haiyu (海語, On the Sea), uses Wanli Changsha (萬里長沙) for Spratly and noted that it is located southeast of Wanli Shitang (Paracels). When the Ming Dynasty collapsed, the Qing dynasty continued to include the territory in maps compiled in 1724, 1755, 1767, 1810, and 1817, but did not officially claim jurisdiction over these islands.

An early European map, A correct chart of the China Seas of 1758 by William Herbert, left the Spratly Islands region (known then as the Dangerous Ground) as largely blank, indicating that region has yet to be properly surveyed, although some islands and shoals at its western edge were marked (one appears at the same place as Thitu Island).

A number of maps of the South China Sea were later produced, but the first map that gives a reasonably accurate delineation of the Spratly Islands region (titled [South] China Sea, Sheet 1) was only published in 1821 by the hydrographer of the East India Company James Horsburgh after a survey by Captain Daniel Ross. A later 1859 edition of the map named the Spratly Island as Storm Island.

The islands were sporadically visited throughout the 19th and early 20th centuries by mariners from different European powers (including Richard Spratly, after whom the island group derives its most recognisable English name, who visited the group in the 1840s in his whaler Cyrus).

However, these nations showed little interest in the islands. In 1883, German boats surveyed the Spratly and the Paracel Islands but eventually withdrew the survey, after receiving protests from the Guangdong government representing the Qing dynasty. China sent naval forces on inspection tours in 1902 and 1907 and placed flags and markers on the islands.

A Vietnamese map from 1834 also combines the Spratly and Paracel Islands into one region known as "Vạn Lý Trường Sa", a feature commonly incorporated into maps of the era (萬里長沙) ‒ that is, the same as the aforementioned Chinese island name Wanli Changsha. According to Hanoi, Vietnamese maps record Bãi Cát Vàng (Golden Sandbanks, referring to both the Spratly and Paracel Islands), which lay near the coast of the central Vietnam, as early as 1838.

In Phủ Biên Tạp Lục (The Frontier Chronicles) by scholar Lê Quý Đôn, both Hoàng Sa and Trường Sa were defined as belonging to the Quảng Ngãi District. He described it as where sea products and shipwrecked cargoes were available to be collected. Vietnamese text written in the 17th century referenced government-sponsored economic activities during the Lê dynasty, 200 years earlier. The Vietnamese government conducted several geographical surveys of the islands in the 18th century.

Despite the fact that China and Vietnam both made a claim to these territories simultaneously, at the time, neither side was aware that its neighbour had already charted and made claims to the same stretch of islands.

In 1888 the Central Borneo Company were granted a lease to work guano "on Sprattly island and Amboyna Cay". During the Second World War troops from French Indochina and Japan were in occupation. In 1956 Filipino adventurer Tomás Cloma Sr. decided to "claim" a part of Spratly islands as his own, naming it the "Free Territory of Freedomland".

In the 1950s, a group of individuals claimed sovereignty over the islands in the name of Morton F. Meads, supposedly an American descendant of a British naval captain who gave his name to Meads Island (Itu Aba) in the 1870s. In an affidavit made in 1971, the group claimed to represent the Kingdom of Humanity/Republic of Morac-Songhrati-Meads, which they asserted was in turn the successor entity for a supposed Kingdom of Humanity established between the two world wars on Meads Island, allegedly by the son of the British captain. This claim to this would-be micronation fell dormant after 1972, when several members of the group drowned in a typhoon.

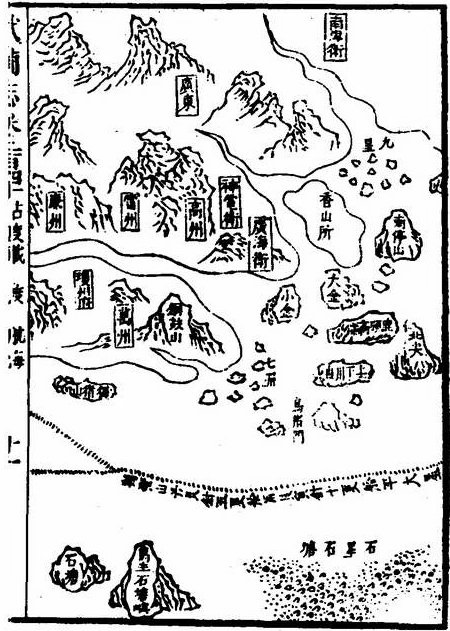
In the Mao Kun map, Spratly Islands are suggested to be the islands at the bottom right (石星石塘; shíxīng shítáng). Others however believe they referred to the Paracel Islands or Macclesfield Bank.

The Velarde map shows Galit, Pancot, and Lumbay, which the Philippines identifies as the Scarborough Shoal and islands off of Palawan. It was used in the South China Sea Arbitration.

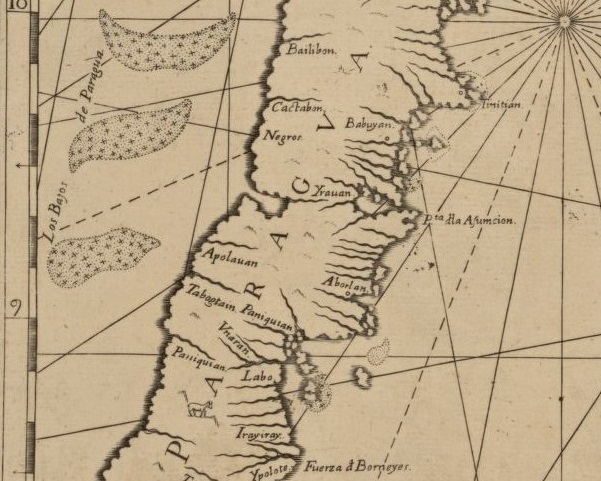
The Spratlys, labeled as Los Bajos de Paragua, off the coast of Palawan (Paragua) on the Velarde map

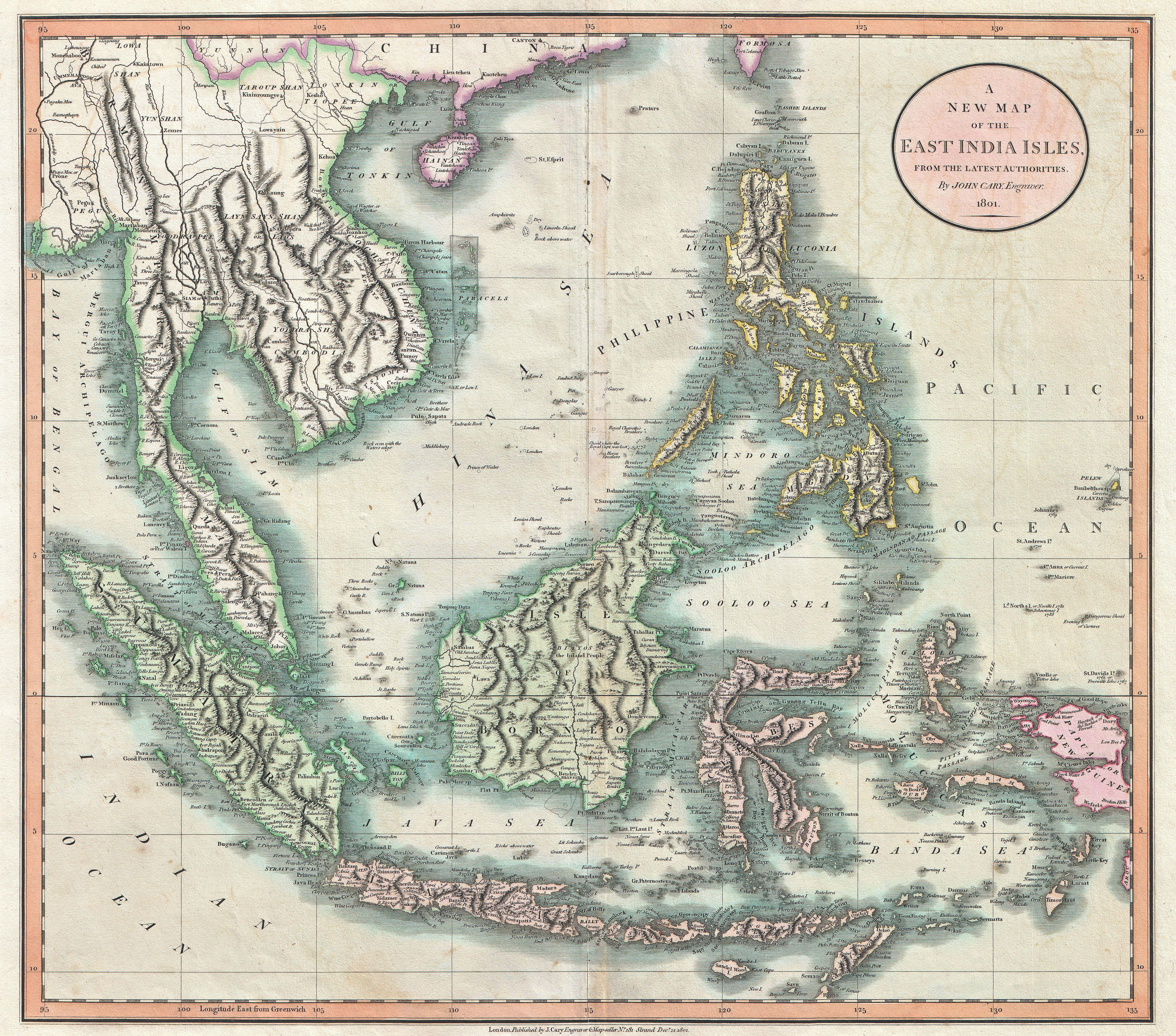
An 1801 Cary Map of the East Indies and Southeast Asia showing Panacot, the Scarborough Shoal, Amphitrite, the Paracels, and what is now known as the Spratlys

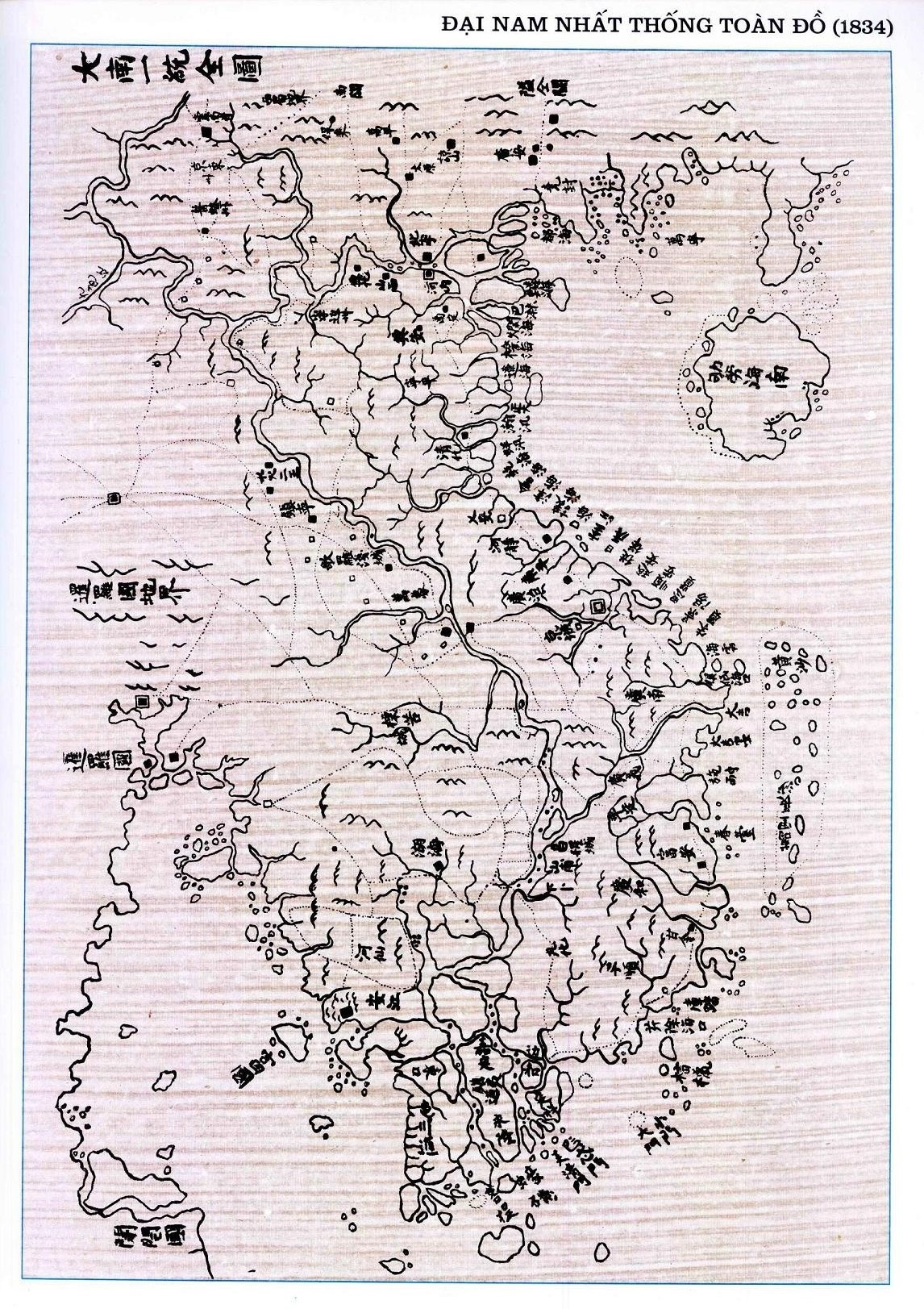
An 1838 Unified Dai Nam map marking Trường Sa and Hoàng Sa, which are considered as Spratly and Paracel Islands by some Vietnamese scholars

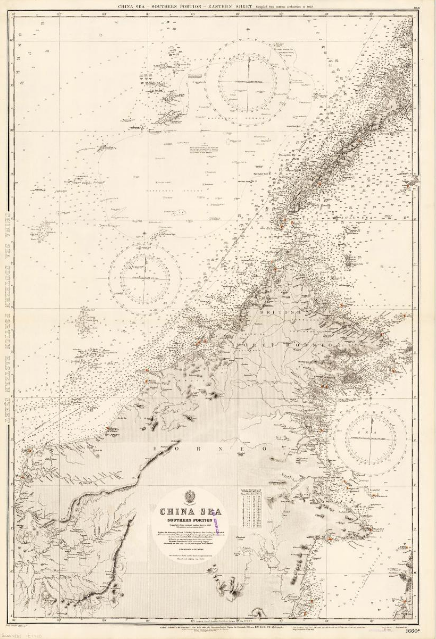
A British chart of the sea in northern Borneo, first issued in 1881 and corrected in 1935

=== Military conflicts and diplomatic dialogues ===
The following are political divisions for the Spratly Islands claimed by various area nations (in alphabetical order):

- Brunei: Part of Brunei's Exclusive Economic Zone
- China: Part of Sansha, Hainan
- Malaysia: Part of Sabah state
- Philippines: Part of Kalayaan, Palawan province
- Taiwan: Part of Kaohsiung municipality
- Vietnam: Part of Trường Sa, Khánh Hòa Province

==== Conflicts in the 19th century ====
In the 19th century, Europeans found that Chinese fishermen from Hainan annually sojourned on the Spratly islands for part of the year, while in 1877 it was the British who launched the first modern legal claims to the Spratly Islands.

Some Chinese scholars and officials argue that the 1887 Sino-French Tonkin Boundary convention signed after the Sino-French War recognised the sovereignty of China over the Paracel and Spratly islands. The line mentioned in the convention can be more accurately described as a shorthand for dividing islands between China and Vietnam in the Gulf of Tonkin, but not its maritime waters.

Historically under French colonial administration within French Indochina, Bạch Long Vĩ Island faced a brief period of transitional control in the mid-1950s. Following the 1954 Geneva Accords and the withdrawal of French forces, a garrison of Kuomintang troops fleeing mainland China occupied the island.

In July 1955, the PLA launched an operation to expel the Kuomintang forces and established temporary military control over the island. At the time, the Democratic Republic of Vietnam lacked the naval capability to immediately occupy and secure offshore islands.

Following diplomatic consultations between the two governments, the PRC officially transferred control of the island to North Vietnam on January 16 1957. The sovereignty over the island was later formally reaffirmed by both nations in the 2000 Gulf of Tonkin Delimitation Agreement.

In 1933 and 1937 France sent diplomatic notes to China maintaining that the 1887 treaty determined the ownership of islands near the Móng Cái area only not anywhere beyond that.

The Chinese Ministry of Foreign Affairs also try to claim that a 1883 incident involving a German ship conducting surveys in the South China Sea without China's consent was protested with Berlin and the Germans terminated the survey. Western scholars have determined, however, that this incident is not based on verifiable references and is inconsistent with other Chinese inaction during the same time period given that, in 1885, the German Admiralty published a two‐sheet chart entitled Die Paracel‐Inseln (The Paracel Islands). The chart documented the work of a German expedition to the Paracels between 1881 and 1884.

==== Conflicts in the 20th century until 1945 ====
China sent naval forces on inspection tours in 1902 and 1907 and placed flags and markers on the islands. The Qing dynasty's successor state, the Republic of China, claimed the Spratly and Paracel islands under the jurisdiction of Hainan.

In 1933, France asserted its claims to the Spratly and Paracel Islands on behalf of its then-colony French Indochina. It occupied a number of the Spratly Islands, including Taiping Island, built weather stations on two of the islands, and administered them as part of French Indochina. This occupation was protested by the Republic of China (ROC) government because France admitted finding Chinese fishermen there when French warships visited nine of the islands. In 1935, the ROC government also announced a sovereignty claim on the Spratly Islands. Japan occupied some of the islands in 1939 during World War II, and it used the islands as a submarine base for the occupation of Southeast Asia. During the Japanese occupation, these islands were called Shinnan Shoto (新南諸島), literally the New Southern Islands, and together with the Paracel Islands (西沙群岛), they were put under the governance of the Japanese authority in Taiwan on 30 March 1939.

Japan occupied the Paracels and the Spratly Islands from February 1939 to August 1945. Japan annexed the Spratly Islands via Taiwan's jurisdiction and the Paracels via Hainan's jurisdiction. Parts of the Paracels and Spratly Islands were again controlled by Republic of China after the 1945 surrender of Japan, since the Allied powers assigned the Republic of China to receive Japanese surrenders in that area, however no successor was named to the islands.

==== Conflicts in the 20th century after World War II ====
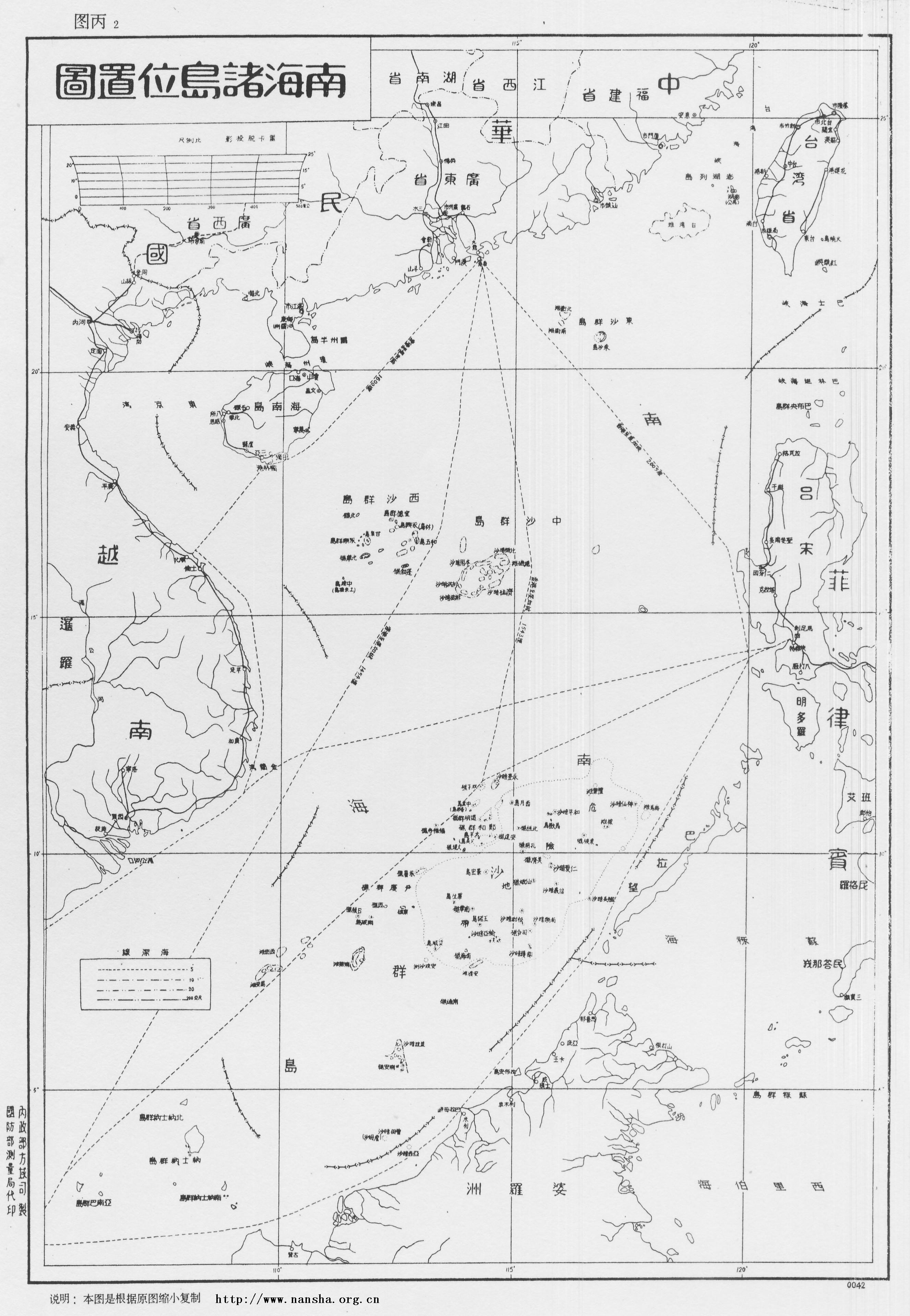
China's (now ROC and PRC) nine-dash line illustrated in a 1947 map of the South China Sea

In November 1946, the ROC sent naval ships to take control of the islands after the surrender of Japan. It had chosen the largest and perhaps the only inhabitable island, Taiping Island, as its base, and it renamed the island under the name of the naval vessel as Taiping. Also following the defeat of Japan at the end of World War II, the ROC re-claimed the entirety of the Spratly Islands (including Taiping Island) after accepting the Japanese surrender of the islands based on the Cairo and Potsdam Declarations. The Republic of China then garrisoned Itu Aba (Taiping) island in 1946 and posted Chinese flags. The aim of the Republic of China was to block the French claims. The Republic of China drew up the map showing the U-shaped claim on the entire South China Sea, showing the Spratly and Paracels in Chinese territory, in 1947.

Japan had renounced all claims to the islands in the 1951 San Francisco Peace Treaty together with the Paracels, Pratas and other islands captured from the Chinese, and upon these declarations, the government of the Republic of China reasserted its claim to the islands. At the peace conference, South Vietnam declared Vietnamese sovereignty over the Spratlys, but North Vietnam supported China's authority. The Chinese Kuomintang force withdrew from most of the Spratly and Paracel Islands after they retreated to Taiwan from the opposing Chinese Communist Party due to their losses in the Chinese Civil War and the founding of the People's Republic of China (PRC) in 1949. Taiwan quietly withdrew troops from Taiping Island in 1950, but then reinstated them in 1956 in response to Tomás Cloma's sudden claim to the island as part of Freedomland. As of 2013, Taiping Island is administered by Taiwan.

After pulling out its garrison in 1950 when the Republic of China evacuated to Taiwan, when the Filipino Tomas Cloma uprooted an ROC flag on Itu Aba and laid claim to the Spratly Islands, Taiwan again regarrisoned Itu Aba in 1956. In 1946, the Americans allegedly reminded the Philippines at its independence that the Spratly Islands were not Philippine territory, both to not anger Chiang Kai-shek in China and because the Spratly Islands were not part of the Philippines per the 1898 treaty Spain signed with the United States.

However, no document was found to that effect. The Philippines then claimed the Spratly Islands in 1971 under President Marcos, after Taiwanese troops attacked and shot at a Philippine fishing boat on Itu Aba.

Taiwan's garrison from 1946 to 1950 and 1956-now on Itu Aba represents an "effective occupation" of the Spratly Islands. China established a coastal defence system against Japanese pirates or smugglers.

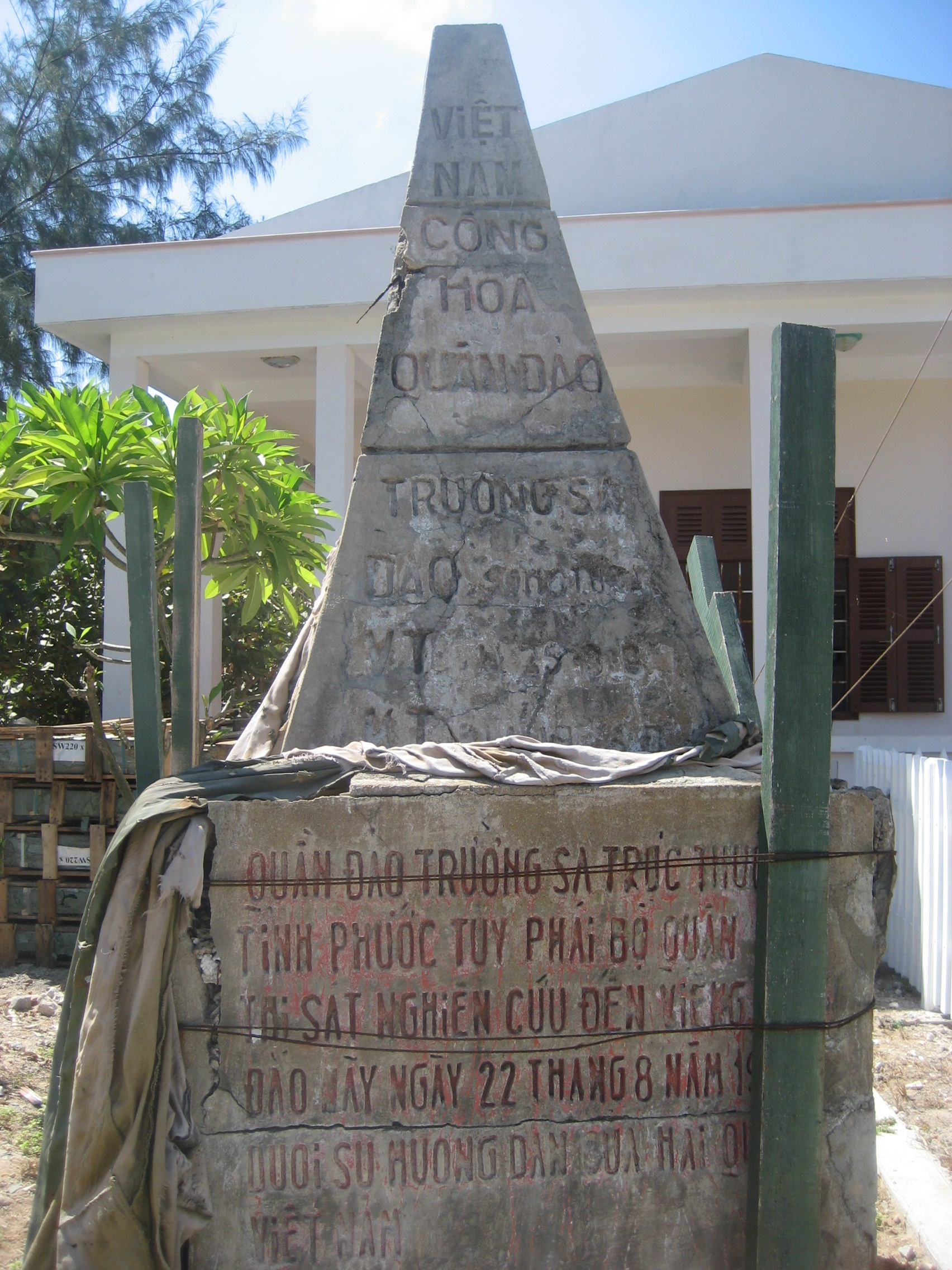
Territorial monument of the Republic of Vietnam (South Vietnam) on Southwest Cay, Spratly Islands, defining the cay as part of Vietnamese territory (Phước Tuy Province). Used from 22 August 1956 until 1975, when replaced by another one from the Socialist Republic of Vietnam (successor state after the Fall of Saigon)

North Vietnam seemed to have recognised China's claims on the Paracels and Spratly Islands during the Vietnam War as it was being supported by China. In 1958 China issued a declaration defining its territorial waters that encompassed the Spratly Islands. North Vietnam's prime minister, Phạm Văn Đồng, sent a formal note to Zhou Enlai, stating that the Government of the Democratic Republic of Vietnam (DRV) respected a Chinese statement, which had mentioned the Paracels and the Spratlys by name as belonging to China, regarding the 12-nautical mile limit of its territorial waters. China also cites correspondence from the Vietnamese government or officials on two other occasions. After North Vietnam won the war and unified with South Vietnam however, Vietnam stated that while it had previously acquiesced to Chinese claims, the times have since changed. Vietnamese sources also argue that Phạm Văn Đồng's note was concerned with the breadth of territorial waters only not China's claims.

In 1983, Vietnamese forces occupying Amboyna Cay fired on a DXpedition boat flying a German flag, killing one passenger but allowing the remaining passengers and crew to escape in a rescue dinghy. Adrift for ten days, two surviving passengers and both crew members were saved by a Japanese freighter.

In 1987, China installed a small military structure on Fiery Cross Reef under the pretext of building an oceanic observation station and installing a tide gauge for the Global Sea Level Observing System. After a deadly skirmish with the Vietnamese Navy, China installed some military structures on more reefs in the vicinity of the Philippines and Vietnamese occupied islands and this led to escalating tensions between these countries and China over the status and ownership of reefs.

In 1988, the Vietnamese and Chinese navies engaged in a skirmish in the area of Johnson South Reef (also called Gạc Ma Reef in Vietnam and Yongshu Reef in China).

Under President Lee Teng-hui, Taiwan stated that "legally, historically, geographically, or in reality", all of the South China Sea and Spratly islands were Taiwan's territory and under Taiwanese sovereignty, and denounced actions undertaken there by Malaysia and the Philippines, in a statement on 13 July 1999 released by the foreign ministry of Taiwan. Taiwan and China's claims "mirror" each other; during international talks involving the Spratly islands, China and Taiwan have cooperated with each other since both have the same claims.

It was unclear whether France continued its claim to the islands after World War II, since none of the islands, other than Taiping Island, was habitable. The South Vietnamese government took over the Trường Sa administration after the defeat of the French at the end of the First Indochina War. "The French bestowed its titles, rights, and claims over the two island chains to the Republic of Vietnam (RoV) in accordance with the Geneva Accords", said Nguyen Hong Thao, Associate Professor at Faculty of Law, Vietnam National University.

In 1999, a Philippine navy ship (Number 57 – BRP Sierra Madre) was purposely run aground near Second Thomas Shoal to enable establishment of an outpost. As of 2014 it had not been removed, and Filipino marines have been stationed aboard since the grounding.

==== Conflicts in the 21st century ====
Taiwan and mainland China are largely strategically aligned on the Spratly islands issue, since they both claim exactly the same area, so Taiwan's control of Itu Aba (Taiping) island is viewed as an extension of China's claim. Taiwan and China both claim the entire island chain, while all the other claimants only claim portions of them. China has proposed co-operation with Taiwan against all the other countries claiming the islands. Taiwanese lawmakers have demanded that Taiwan fortify Itu Aba (Taiping) island with weapons to defend against the Vietnamese, and both China and Taiwanese NGOs have pressured Taiwan to expand Taiwan's military capabilities on the island, which played a role in Taiwan expanding the island's runway in 2012. China has urged Taiwan to co-operate and offered Taiwan a share in oil and gas resources while shutting out all the other rival claimants. Taiwanese lawmakers have complained about repeated Vietnamese aggression and trespassing on Taiwan's Itu Aba (Taiping), and Taiwan has started viewing Vietnam as an enemy over the Spratly Islands, not China. Taiwan's state run oil company CPC Corporation's board director Chiu Yi has called Vietnam as the "greatest threat" to Taiwan. Taiwan's airstrip on Taiping has irritated Vietnam. China views Taiwan's expansion of its military and airstrip on Taiping as benefiting China's position against the other rival claimants from southeast Asian countries. China's claims to the Spratly Islands benefit from legal weight because of Taiwan's presence on Itu Aba, while America on the other hand has regularly ignored Taiwan's claims in the South China Sea and does not include Taiwan in any talks on dispute resolution for the area.

Taiwan performed live fire military exercises on Taiping island in September 2012; reports said that Vietnam was explicitly named by the Taiwanese military as the "imaginary enemy" in the drill. Vietnam protested against the exercises as violation of its territory and "voiced anger", demanding that Taiwan stop the drill. Among the inspectors of the live fire drill were Taiwanese national legislators, adding to the tensions.

In May 2011, Chinese patrol boats attacked two Vietnamese oil exploration ships near the Spratly Islands. Also in May 2011, Chinese naval vessels opened fire on Vietnamese fishing vessels operating off East London Reef (Da Dong). The three Chinese military vessels were numbered 989, 27 and 28, and they showed up with a small group of Chinese fishing vessels. Another Vietnamese fishing vessel was fired on near Fiery Cross Reef (Chu Thap). The Chief Commander of Border Guards in Phú Yên Province, Vietnam, reported that a total of four Vietnamese vessels were fired upon by Chinese naval vessels. These incidents involving Chinese forces sparked mass protests in Vietnam, especially in Hanoi and Ho Chi Minh City, and in various Vietnamese communities in the West (namely in the US state of California and in Paris) over attacks on Vietnamese citizens and the intrusion into what Vietnam claimed was part of its territory.

In June 2011, the Philippines began officially referring to parts of the South China Sea as the "West Philippine Sea" and the Reed Bank as "Recto Bank".

In July 2012, the National Assembly of Vietnam passed a law demarcating Vietnamese sea borders to include the Spratly and Paracel Islands.

In 2010, it was reported that the former Malaysian Prime Minister Mahathir Mohamad believed Malaysia could profit from China's economic growth through co-operation with China, and said that China "was not a threat to anyone and was not worried about aggression from China", as well as accusing the US of provoking China and trying to turn China's neighbours against China. Malaysian authorities displayed no concern over China conducting a military exercise at James Shoal in March 2013, with its Defence Minister Hishammuddin Hussein suggested they might work with China and saying that Malaysia had no problem with China patrolling the South China Sea, and telling ASEAN, America, and Japan that "Just because you have enemies, doesn't mean your enemies are my enemies". However, until present Malaysia still maintained balanced relations with the countries involved in this dispute. But since China has started encroaching its territorial waters, Malaysia has become active in condemning China.

The editorial of the Taiwanese news website Want China Times accused America of being behind the May 2014 flareup in the South China Sea, saying that Vietnam rammed a Chinese vessel on 2 May over an oil rig drilling platform and the Philippines detained 11 Chinese fishermen because of Obama's visit to the region and that they were incited by America "behind the scenes". Want China Times claimed America ordered Vietnam on 7 May to complain about the drilling platform, and noted that a joint military exercise was happening at this time between the Philippines and America, and also noted that the American New York Times newspaper supported Vietnam.

In a series of news stories on 16 April 2015, it was revealed, through photos taken by Airbus, that China had been building an airstrip on Fiery Cross Reef, one of the southern islands. The 10,000-foot-long (3,048 m) runway covers a significant portion of the island, and is viewed as a possible strategic threat to other countries with claims to the islands, such as Vietnam and the Philippines.

Champa historically had a large presence in the South China Sea. The Vietnamese broke Champa's power in an invasion of Champa in 1471, and then finally conquered the last remnants of the Cham people in an invasion in 1832. A Cham named Katip Suma who received Islamic education in Kelantan declared a Jihad against the Vietnamese, and fighting continued until the Vietnamese crushed the remnants of the resistance in 1835. The Cham organisation Front de Libération du Champa was part of the United Front for the Liberation of Oppressed Races, which waged war against the Vietnamese for independence in the Vietnam War along with the Montagnard and Khmer Krom minorities. The last remaining FULRO insurgents surrendered to the United Nations in 1992.

The Vietnamese government fears that evidence of Champa's influence over the disputed area in the South China Sea would bring attention to human rights violations and killings of ethnic minorities in Vietnam such as in the 2001 and 2004 uprisings, and lead to the issue of Cham autonomy being brought into the dispute, since the Vietnamese conquered the Hindu and Muslim Cham people in a war in 1832.

Japanese scholar Taoka Shunji said in a journal article that the assumption amongst many Japanese people that the territory of the Philippines was being invaded by China, was incorrect. He pointed out that the Spratly islands were not part of the Philippines, when the US acquired the Philippines from Spain in the Treaty of Paris in 1898, and when the Japanese-ruled Taiwan itself had annexed the Spratly islands in 1938, the US-ruled Philippines did not challenge the move and never asserted that it was their territory. He also pointed out that other countries did not need to do full land reclamation since they already control islands, and that the reason China engaged in extensive land reclamation is because they needed it to build airfields since China only has control over reefs.

The "Moro" as "people", is used to describe both the Filipino Muslims and their homeland. Ancestors of Moro people were the owners of Spratly Islands prior to the arrival of the Spanish colonials in the 16th century, according to the Sultan of Sulu in the southern Philippines reported in a local paper. "China has no right over the Spratly Islands in what it calls the South China Sea because that is part of our ancestral domain," Majaraj Julmuner Jannaral, Sultanate information officer, told the Philippine Star. "The Spratly Archipelago is part of the Sulu Sea (the inner area around the islands in the southern Philippines, which is part of the West Philippine Sea (designation of parts of the South China Sea claimed by the Philippines to be part of its EEZ)," Jannaral concluded. "Exploration of the marine territory and the waters around the Spratly Archipelago, Palawan in southwestern Philippines and the southern Philippines, belong to the residents in those areas," he added. The Sultanate of Sulu claims historic proprietary rights over the Spratly Islands since before the Spanish colonial era.

Various incidents of fishing boats being harassed by Chinese warships have occurred. At least 2 vessels were rammed or sunk. One was a Vietnamese ship attacked by a Chinese coastguard vessel, and another was a Filipino ship rammed and sunk by a Chinese fishing boat who let the Filipino fishermen drift at sea without giving aid. The stranded fishermen were later rescued by a Vietnamese ship.

In 2017, the United States despite not being a claimant in the Spratly dispute, reported using freedom of navigation operations (FONOPs) to challenge what it deemed as excessive and illegal maritime claims from multiple Asia-Pacific states including Cambodia, China, India, Indonesia, Malaysia, Maldives, the Philippines, Sri Lanka, Taiwan, and Vietnam.

In 2022, Vietnam demanded that Taiwan cease conducting live fire exercises at the Spratly Islands.

=== 2016 arbitration ===
In January 2013, the Philippines initiated arbitration proceedings against China under the United Nations Convention on the Law of the Sea (UNCLOS) across a range of issues, including the latter's historic rights claims over parts or all of the Spratly Islands inside the nine-dash line. A tribunal of arbitrators constituted under Annex VII of UNCLOS appointed the Permanent Court of Arbitration (PCA) as registry to the proceedings.

On 12 July 2016, the arbitral tribunal ruled in favor of the Philippines on most of its submissions. While it would not "rule on any question of sovereignty over land territory and would not delimit any maritime boundary between the Parties", it concluded that China had not historically exercised exclusive control within the nine-dash line, hence has "no legal basis" to claim "historic rights" to resources. It also concluded that China's historic rights claims over the maritime areas (as opposed to land masses and territorial waters) inside the nine-dash line would have no lawful effect outside of what is entitled to under UNCLOS. (Note: PCA Award, Section V(F)(d)(264, 266, 267), p. 113.) (Note: PCA Award, Section V(F)(d)(278), p. 117.) It criticized China's land reclamation projects and construction of artificial islands in the Spratly Islands, saying that they had caused "severe harm to the coral reef environment". Finally, it characterized Taiping Island and other features of the Spratly Islands as "rocks" under UNCLOS, and therefore are not entitled to a 200 nautical mile exclusive economic zone. The award was ruled as final and non-appealable by either country. China rejected the ruling, calling it "ill-founded". Taiwan, which currently administers Taiping Island, the largest of the Spratly Islands, also rejected the ruling. As of November 2023, 26 governments support the ruling, 17 issued generally positive statements noting the ruling but not called for compliance, and eight rejected it. The governments in support were Australia, Austria, Belgium, Canada, the Czech Republic, Denmark, Finland, France, Germany, Greece, India, Ireland, Italy, Japan, the Netherlands, New Zealand, the Philippines, Poland, Portugal, Romania, Slovakia, South Korea, Spain, Sweden, the United Kingdom, and the US; the eight in opposition were China, Montenegro, Pakistan, Russia, Sudan, Syria, Taiwan, and Vanuatu. The United Nations itself does not have a position on the legal and procedural merits of the case or on the disputed claims, and the Secretary-General expressed his hope that the continued consultations on a Code of Conduct between ASEAN and China under the framework of the Declaration of the Conduct of Parties in the South China Sea will lead to increased mutual understanding among all the parties.

== Transportation and communication ==
=== Airports ===
| Location | Occupied by | Name | Code | Built | Length | Notes |
|---|---|---|---|---|---|---|
| Taiping Island | Republic of China | Taiping Island Airport | RCSP | 2007 | 1,200 m (est.) | Military use only. No refueling facilities. |
| Swallow Reef (Layang-Layang) | Malaysia | Layang-Layang Airport | LAC | 1995 | 1,367 m | Dual-use concrete airport. |
| Fiery Cross Reef | China | Yongshu Airport | AG 4553 | 2016 | 3,300 m (est.) | Dual-use concrete airport. |
| Subi Reef | China | Zhubi Airport | | 2016 | 3,000 m (est.) | Dual-use concrete airport. |
| Mischief Reef | China | Meiji Airport | | 2016 | 2,700 m (est.) | Dual-use concrete airport. |
| Thitu Island (Pag-asa) | Philippines | Rancudo Airfield | RPPN | 1978 | 1,300 m (est.) | Dual-use concrete airport. |
| Spratly Island (Trường Sa Lớn) | Vietnam | Trường Sa Airport | | 1976–77 | 1,200 - 1,300 m (est.) | Military use only. Extended from 600 m to 1,200 m in 2016. |
| Barque Canada Reef (Bãi Thuyền Chài) | Vietnam | Bãi Thuyền Chài Airport | | 2025 | 3,200 m (est.) | Likely military use only. |

=== Telecommunications ===
In 2005, a cellular phone base station was erected by the Philippines' Smart Communications on Pag-asa Island.

Vietnam Military Telecommunications Corp., known commonly as Viettel, established mobile coverage in the Spratly Islands in 2007.

On 18 May 2011, China Mobile announced that its mobile phone coverage has expanded to the Spratly Islands. The extended coverage would allow soldiers stationed on the islands, fishermen, and merchant vessels within the area to use mobile services, and can also provide assistance during storms and sea rescues. The service network deployment over the islands took nearly one year.

In 2013, Taiwan's Chunghwa Telecom established a satellite-based cellular base station on Taiping Island.

== Gallery ==
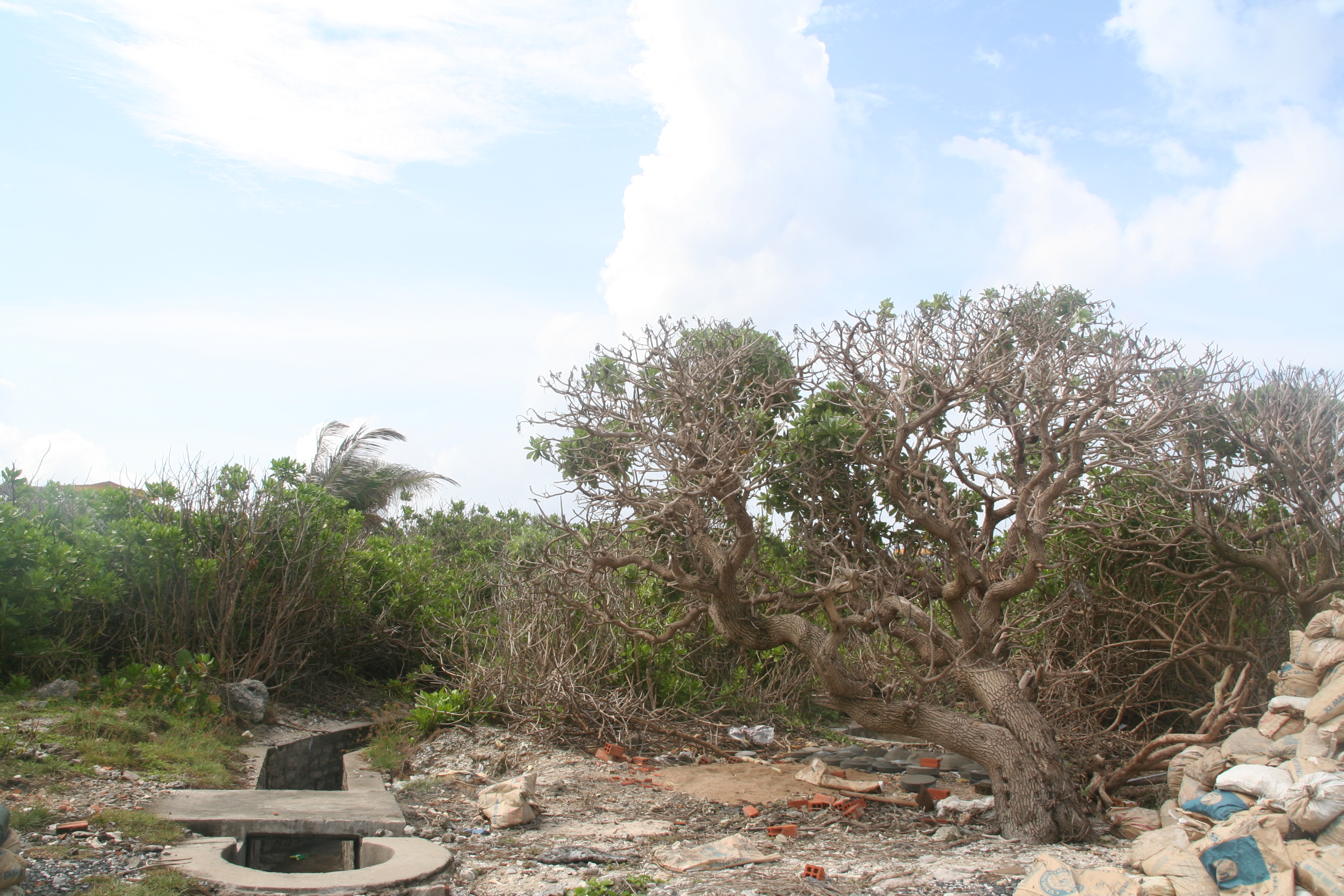
An ancient Heliotropium foertherianum on Spratly Island

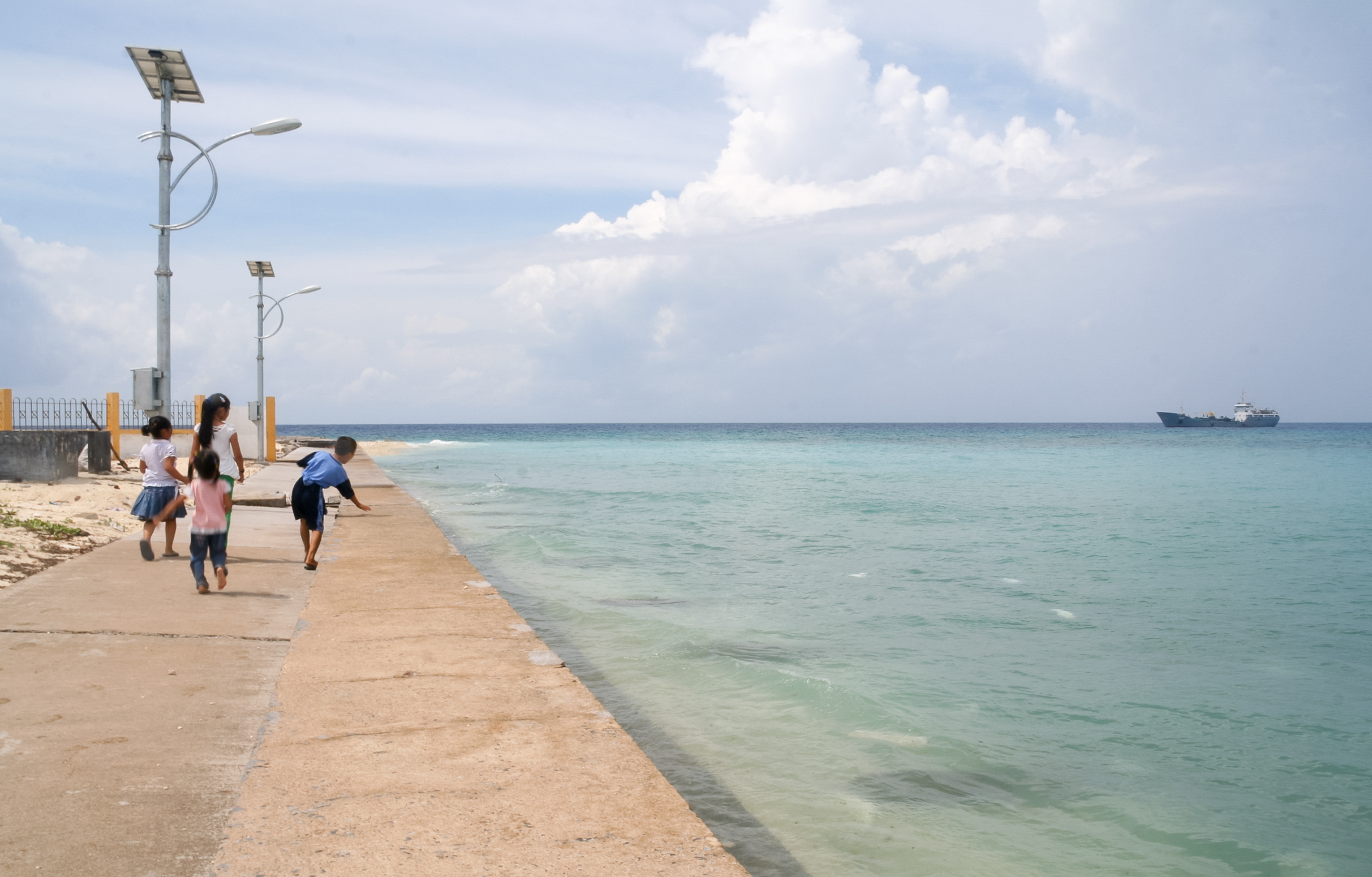
Young Vietnamese residents of Spratly Island

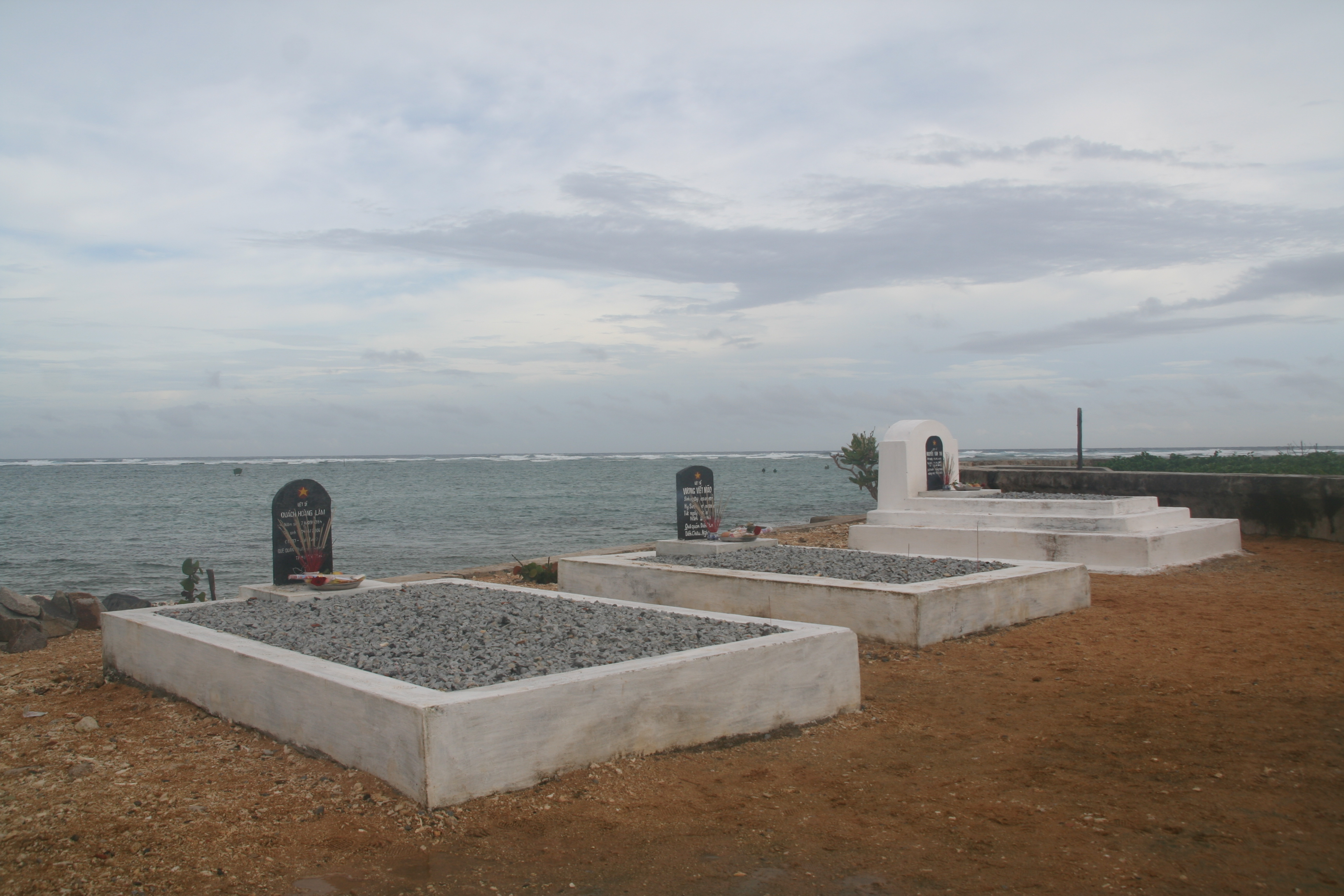
A military cemetery for Vietnamese soldiers on Central London Reef

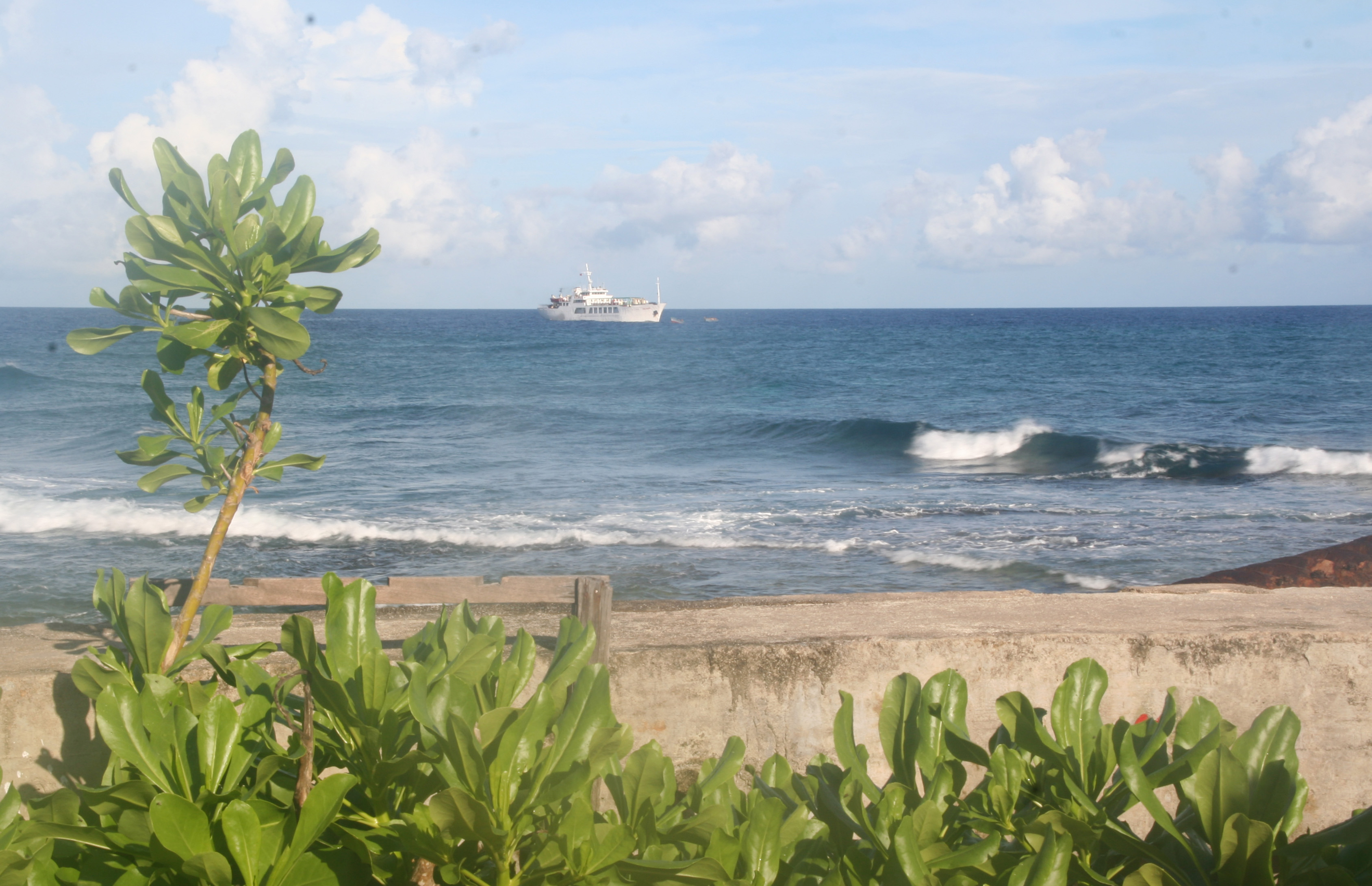
A view from Amboyna Cay

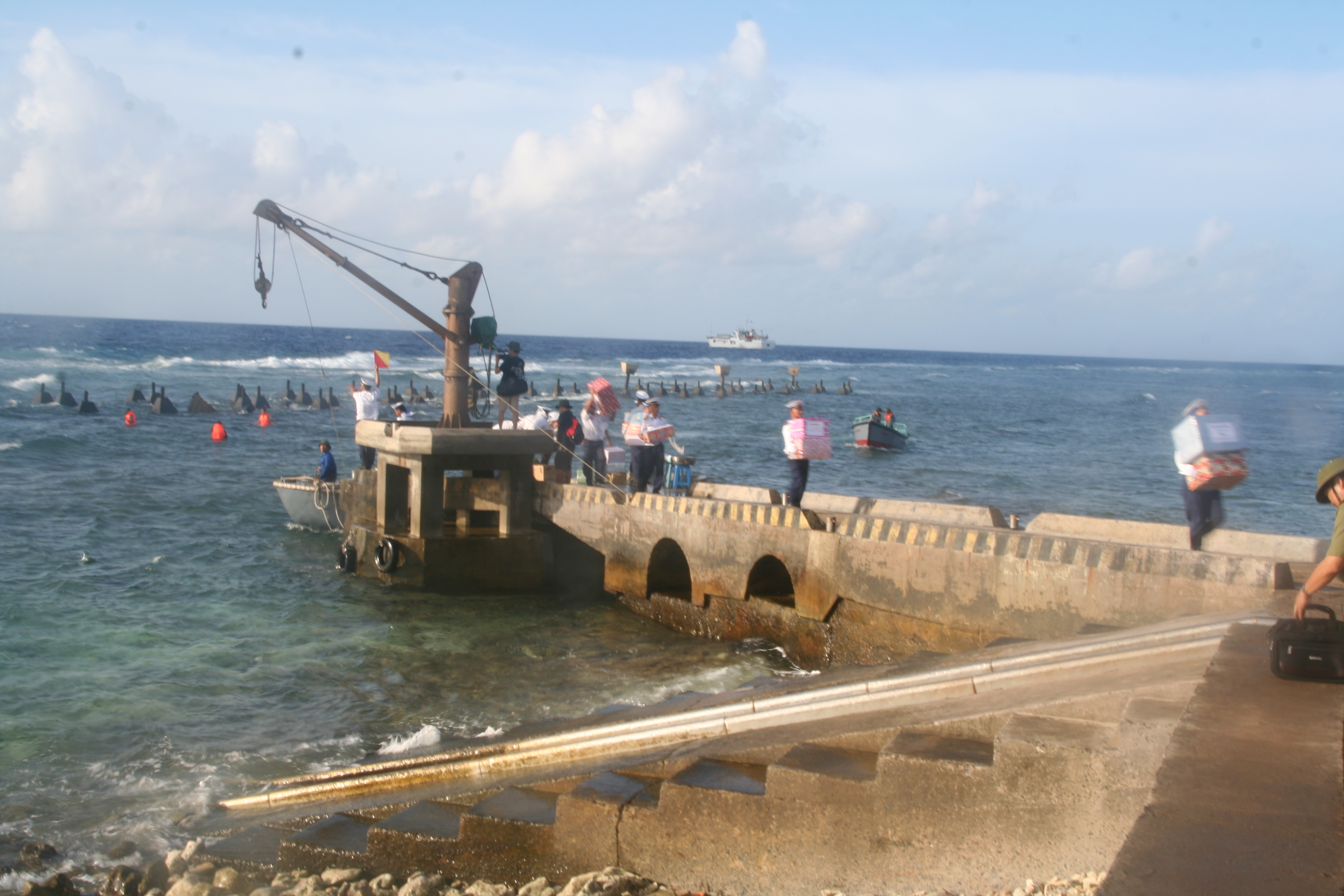
The Pearson Reef dock under Vietnam's administration

== See also ==
- Coral triangle initiative
- Great Wall of Sand
- Johnson South Reef Skirmish
- Keying (ship)
- Kingdom of Humanity
- List of islands in the South China Sea
- List of maritime features in the Spratly Islands
- Natuna Regency
- Paracel Islands
- Philippines and the Spratly Islands
- Philippine Coast Guard
- South China Sea
- South China Sea Islands
- Spratly Islands dispute
- SSN, a computer game set during a conflict over the Spratly Islands
- Territorial disputes in the South China Sea
- Territories claimed by the Philippines
- Tomás Cloma and the Free Territory of Freedomland
