= Eldad Reef =

Reef in the Spratly Islands

Disputed reef
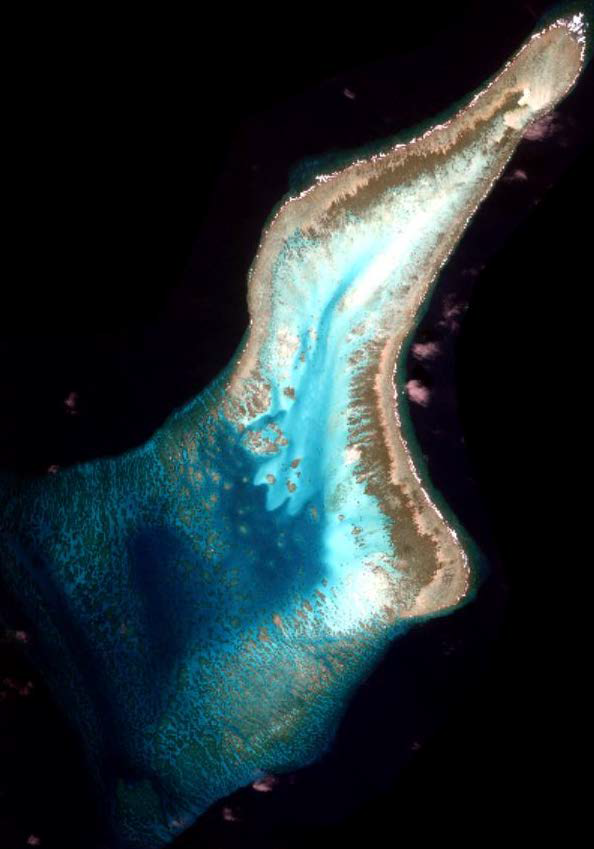
- Photo of Eldad Reef

- Location within Spratly Islands
- Other names: Đá Én Đất (Vietnamese); Malvar Reef (Philippine English); Bahura ng Malvar (Filipino) 安达礁 Āndá Jiāo (Chinese)

Geography
- Location: South China Sea
- Coordinates: 10°21′N 114°42′E
- Archipelago: Spratly Islands

Claimed by
- China
- Philippines
- Vietnam
- Taiwan

Eldad Reef (Filipino: Bahura ng Malvar); Én Đất Reef (Vietnamese: Đá Én Đất); Mandarin Chinese: 安达礁; pinyin: Āndá Jiāo, is a reef on the northeastern part of the Tizard Bank of the Spratly Islands in the South China Sea. Eldad Reef is located about 36 km (22 mi) from Taiping Island to the west, and about 54 km (34 mi) from the Gaven Reefs to the southeast. The government of China, Taiwan, Vietnam and the Philippines claim sovereignty over the reef.

== History ==
In 1935, the Land and Water Map Review Committee of the Republic of China announced the standard name as Irud Reef. In 1947, the Ministry of Internal Affairs of the Republic of China announced the standard name as Anda Reef. In 1983, the China Geographical Names Committee also announced the standard name as Anda Reef. Chinese fishermen call it silver cake (or silver cake sand) and silver pot.

English-language books generally call it "Eldad Reef" (Eldad was the captain of the British ship Cacique, and published his investigation of Eldad Reef in the China Sea Directory in 1868). When Japan invaded and occupied the reef, it was named East Reef; the Philippines named it Malvar Reef, and Vietnam named it đá Én Đất.

== Geography ==
Eldad Reef is located at the northeast end of the Tizard Bank in the Spratly Islands. It is about 14 km (8.7 mi) from Petley Reef to the northwest, 24 km (15 mi) from Sand Cay to the west, and 36 km (22 mi) from Taiping Island to the west. It is about 42 km (26 mi) from Namyit Island to the southeast, and about 54 km (34 mi) from the Gaven Reefs to the southeast.

== Fishery resources ==
Eldad Reef has always been a natural fishing ground for Chinese fishermen, and it is the only place that Chinese fishermen must pass from Huangmashan (Taiping Island) to Triangle Reef and Mischief Reef. Fishermen have a saying of removing more silver cake from horseshoe snails. China's fishery surveys in 1998 and 2002-2004 found that the waters near Eldad Reef are rich in fishery resources, and fishermen have gained abundant harvests from spear fishing, snorkeling and other net gear.

== Legal status ==
Eldad Reef has rocks exposed at high tide. According to the law of the sea, it should be classified as a rock and enjoys 12 nautical miles of territorial sea and contiguous zone. Some scholars have discussed the possibility of setting a straight baseline for the Spratly Islands based on this.

== See also ==
- Spratly Islands dispute
