= Spratly Islands dispute =

Territorial dispute involving multiple countries over the Spratly Islands

The Spratly Islands dispute is an ongoing territorial dispute among Brunei, China (PRC), Malaysia, the Philippines, Taiwan (ROC), and Vietnam concerning "ownership" of the Spratly Islands, a group of islands and associated "maritime features" (reefs, banks, and cays etc.) located in the South China Sea. The dispute is characterized by diplomatic stalemate and the employment of military pressure techniques (such as military occupation of disputed territory) in the advancement of national territorial claims. All except Brunei occupy some of the maritime features.

Most of the "maritime features" in this area have at least six names: The "international name", usually in English; the "Chinese name", sometimes different for PRC and ROC (and also in different character-sets); the Philippine, Vietnamese and Malaysian names, and also, there are alternate names (e.g. Spratly Island is also known as Storm Island), and sometimes names with European origins (French, Portuguese, Spanish, British, etc.).

Although not large, reserves of oil and natural gas have been found in the area. It is a commercial fishing ground and close to global shipping routes. Its strategic position allows countries to monitor maritime activities in the area and project military power. The United Nations Convention on the Law of the Sea (UNCLOS) does not decide on the sovereignty of disputed territories, as that requires separate legal and diplomatic efforts beyond the scope of UNCLOS. Additionally, China (PRC), Taiwan (ROC), and Vietnam are the only ones to have made claims based on historical sovereignty of the islands.

== Background information ==
=== Hydrocarbons ===
Hydrocarbon exploration connected with the wider Spratly Islands dispute has included activity at Recto Bank (Reed Bank), a submerged bank west of Palawan that is geographically separate from the Spratly Islands proper and is subject to overlapping maritime claims.

Petroleum exploration in the Recto Bank area began during the 1970s. Natural gas was discovered in the Sampaguita structure in 1976 following the drilling of an exploratory well. Three wells were subsequently drilled at the southwestern end of the structure, two of which tested gas at rates of 3.6 million and 3.2 million standard cubic feet per day, respectively.

In 1992, the PRC and Vietnam granted oil exploration contracts to United States oil companies covering overlapping areas in the Spratlys. In May 1992, the China National Offshore Oil Corporation (CNOOC) and Crestone Energy, a United States company based in Denver, Colorado, signed a cooperation contract for the joint exploration of the Wan'an Bei-21 block, a 25,155 square kilometres (9,710 mi^{2}) section of the southwestern South China Sea that includes areas claimed as part of the Spratlys.

In 2012–2013, the United States Energy Information Administration estimated that contested areas such as the Paracel Islands and the Spratly Islands contained very little oil and natural gas. Most of the estimated 11 billion barrels of proved or probable oil reserves and 190 trillion cubic feet of proved or probable natural-gas reserves in the South China Sea were situated near undisputed shorelines.

=== Commercial fishing ===
In 2010, the Western Central Pacific (excluding the northernmost reaches of the South China Sea closest to the PRC coast) accounted for 14% of the total world catch at 11.7 million tonnes. This was up from less than 4 million tonnes in 1970. In 1984, Brunei established an exclusive fishing zone encompassing Louisa Reef in the southeastern Spratly Islands.

=== Global shipping ===
The area is close to some of the busiest shipping lanes in the world, accounting for $3.4 trillion of the $16 trillion global trade in 2016.

== Presence by country ==
Presence by China, Malaysia, Philippines, Taiwan, and Vietnam in the Spratly Islands as of 2015

Location of the major islands in Spratly Islands. The eastern Dangerous Ground area contains many other reefs.
- Legend:
- Republic of China (Taiwan): 1: Taiping 2: Zhongzhou
- China: 3: Yongshu 4: Meiji 5: Zhubi 6: Huayang 7: Nanxun 8: Chiguo 9: Dongmen
- Philippines: 10: Flat Island 11: Lankiam Cay 12: Loaita Cay 13: Loaita Island 14: Nanshan Island 15: Northeast Cay 16: Thitu Island 17: West York Island 18: Commodore Reef 19: Irving Reef 20: Second Thomas Shoal
- Vietnam: 21: Southwest Cay 22: Sand Cay 23: Namyit Island 24: Sin Cowe Island 25: Spratly Island 26: Amboyna Cay 27: Grierson Reef 28: Central London Reef 29: Pearson Reef 30: Barque Canada Reef 31: West London Reef 32: Ladd Reef 33: Discovery Great Reef 34: Pigeon Reef 35: East London Reef 36: Alison Reef 37: Cornwallis South Reef 38: Petley Reef 39: South Reef 40: Collins Reef 41: Lansdowne Reef 42: Bombay Castle 43: Prince of Wales Bank 44: Vanguard Bank 45: Prince Consort Bank 46: Grainger Bank 47: Alexandra Bank 48: Orleana Shoal 49: Kingston Shoal
- Malaysia: 50: Swallow Reef 51: Ardasier Reef 52: Dallas Reef 53: Erica Reef 54: Investigator Shoal 55: Mariveles Reef
- Brunei: 56: Louisa Reef

== Claims and their basis ==
The overlapping territorial claims in Spratly Islands

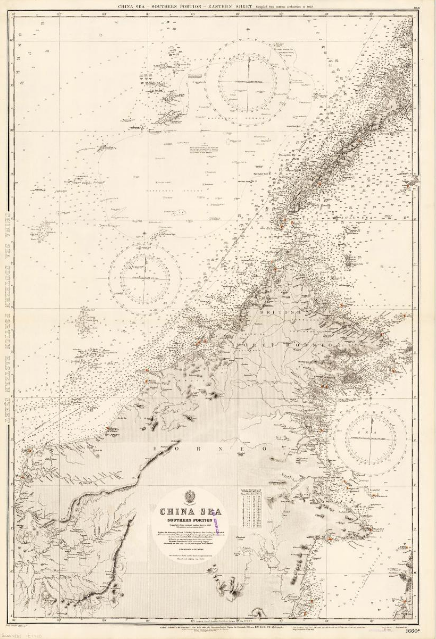
A large black and white British chart of the sea in northern Borneo, first issued in 1881 and corrected to 1935.

China, the Philippines, Taiwan (ROC) and Vietnam claim the whole Spratly Islands while Brunei and Malaysia claim part of the Islands.

=== Brunei ===
Brunei claims the part of the South China Sea nearest to it as part of its continental shelf and exclusive economic zone (EEZ). In 1984, Brunei declared an EEZ encompassing the above-water islets it claims in Louisa Reef. Brunei does not practice military control in the area.

==== Basis of Brunei's claim ====
Brunei's claims to the reef are based on the United Nations Convention on the Law of the Sea (UNCLOS). Brunei states that the southern part of the Spratly Islands chain is actually a part of its continental shelf, and therefore a part of its territory and resources.

=== The People's Republic of China (China) and the Republic of China (Taiwan) ===
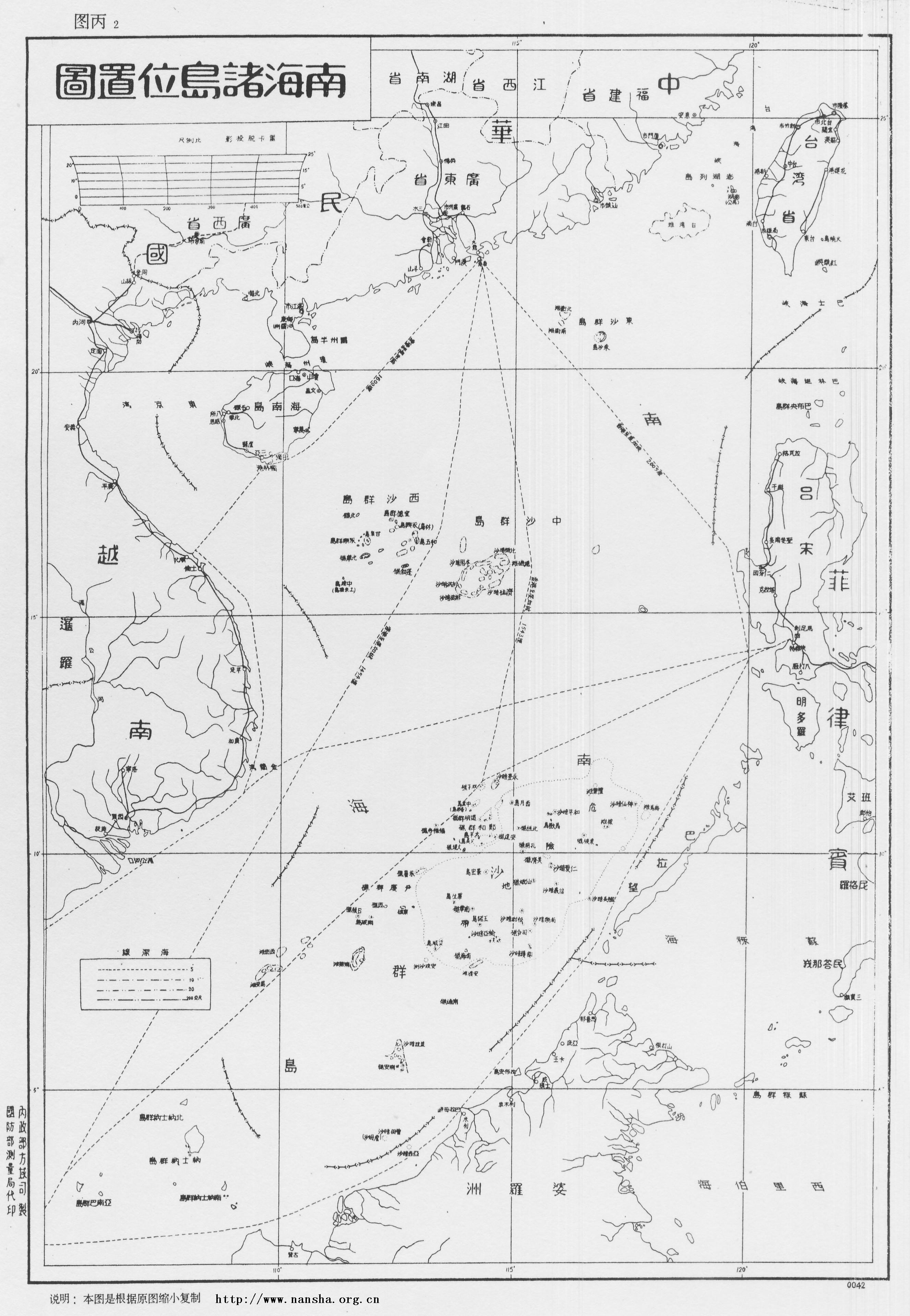
Map of the South China Sea Islands, by Ministry of the Interior, ROC, 1947.

The People's Republic of China (PRC) claims are based on history and not UNCLOS. However, the PRC still claims all of the Spratly Islands as part of China. The PRC is a party to the UNCLOS, signing the agreement on 29 July 1994.

The Republic of China (ROC), which ruled Mainland China before 1949 and has been confined to Taiwan since 1949, also claims all of the Spratly Islands.

==== Basis for the PRC's and the ROC's claims ====
Chinese (Qin dynasty) fishermen may have fished around the islands since 200 BC, although activity dates to before recorded history, thousands of years ago along with neighboring Nusantaria (present-day Philippines, Indonesia, Malaysia, Brunei, Taiwan, and East Timor). China's discovery claims to date back to the Han dynasty in 2 BC. The islands are claimed to have been marked on maps compiled during the Eastern Han dynasty and Eastern Wu (one of the Three Kingdoms). In the Yuan dynasty (12th century), several islands that may be the Spratlys were labelled as Chinese territory according to the Yuanshi, an official history commissioned by the Hongwu Emperor of the Ming dynasty in 1369. Similar labeling also occurred in the Qing dynasty (13th to 19th century); the islands may have appeared on a 1755 map, among others. French divers found remains of a 15th-century Chinese galleon near the coast of Brunei, cited by Beijing as proof that 15th-century Chinese sailed these waters.

In the 19th century, Europeans found that Chinese fishermen from Hainan annually sojourned to the Spratly Islands for part of the year, similar to neighboring Austronesians for thousands of years. In 1877 the British launched the first modern legal claims to the Spratlys.

When it was discovered that the area was being surveyed by Germany in 1883, China issued protests against them. China sent naval forces on inspection tours in 1902 and 1907 of the Paracel Islands and placed flags and markers on the islands. In 1909 it established a naval presence for a time in the Paracels as a reaction to Japanese moves. The Qing dynasty's successor state, the Republic of China, was to later claim the Spratly and Paracel Islands under the jurisdiction of Hainan.

The Spratlys and the Paracels were conquered from France by Japan in 1939. Japan administered the Spratlys via Taiwan's jurisdiction and the Paracels via Hainan's jurisdiction. Upon its surrender in 1945, Japan handed the Paracels and Spratlys to Republic of China as the Allied powers had assigned the Republic of China to receive Japanese surrenders in that area.

After World War II ended, the Republic of China was the "most active claimant". The Republic of China then garrisoned Itu Aba (Taiping) Island in 1946 and posted Chinese flags and markers on it along with Woody island in the Paracels, France tried, but failed to make them leave Woody island. The aim of the Republic of China was to block the French claims. The Republic of China drew up the map showing the U-shaped claim on the entire South China Sea including the Spratly and Paracels in 1947.

Taiwan's garrison from 1946 to 1950 and 1956–present on Itu Aba represents an "effective occupation" of the Spratly Islands.

On May 15, 1996, the PRC submitted to the United Nations its geographic baseline, which included the Paracel Islands and Senkaku/Diaoyu Islands, but did not include the Spratly Islands.

China and Taiwan rejected a 2016 UNCLOS arbitration that found no support for their historical titles to the maritime areas and resources within the nine-dash line, without making determinations regarding the sovereignty of the terrestrial islands there.

=== Malaysia ===
Malaysia claims a small number of islands in the Spratly Islands and its claims cover only the islands included in its exclusive economic zone of 200 miles as defined by the United Nations Convention on the Law of the Sea. Malaysia has militarily occupied five islands that it considers to be within its continental shelf. Swallow Reef (Layang Layang / Terumbu Layang / Pulau Layang Layang) was under control in 1983 and has been turned into an island through a land reclamation which now also hosts a dive resort. The Malaysian military also occupies Ardasier Reef (Terumbu Ubi), and Mariveles Reef (Terumbu Mantanani).

==== Basis of Malaysia's claim ====
Malaysia's claims are based upon the continental shelf principle, and have clearly defined coordinates within the limits of its EEZ defined in 1979. This argument requires that the islands were res nullius and this requirement is said to be satisfied as when Japan renounced their sovereignty over the islands according to the San Francisco Treaty, there was a relinquishment of the right to the islands without any special beneficiary. Therefore, the islands became res nullius and available for annexation.

=== The Philippines ===
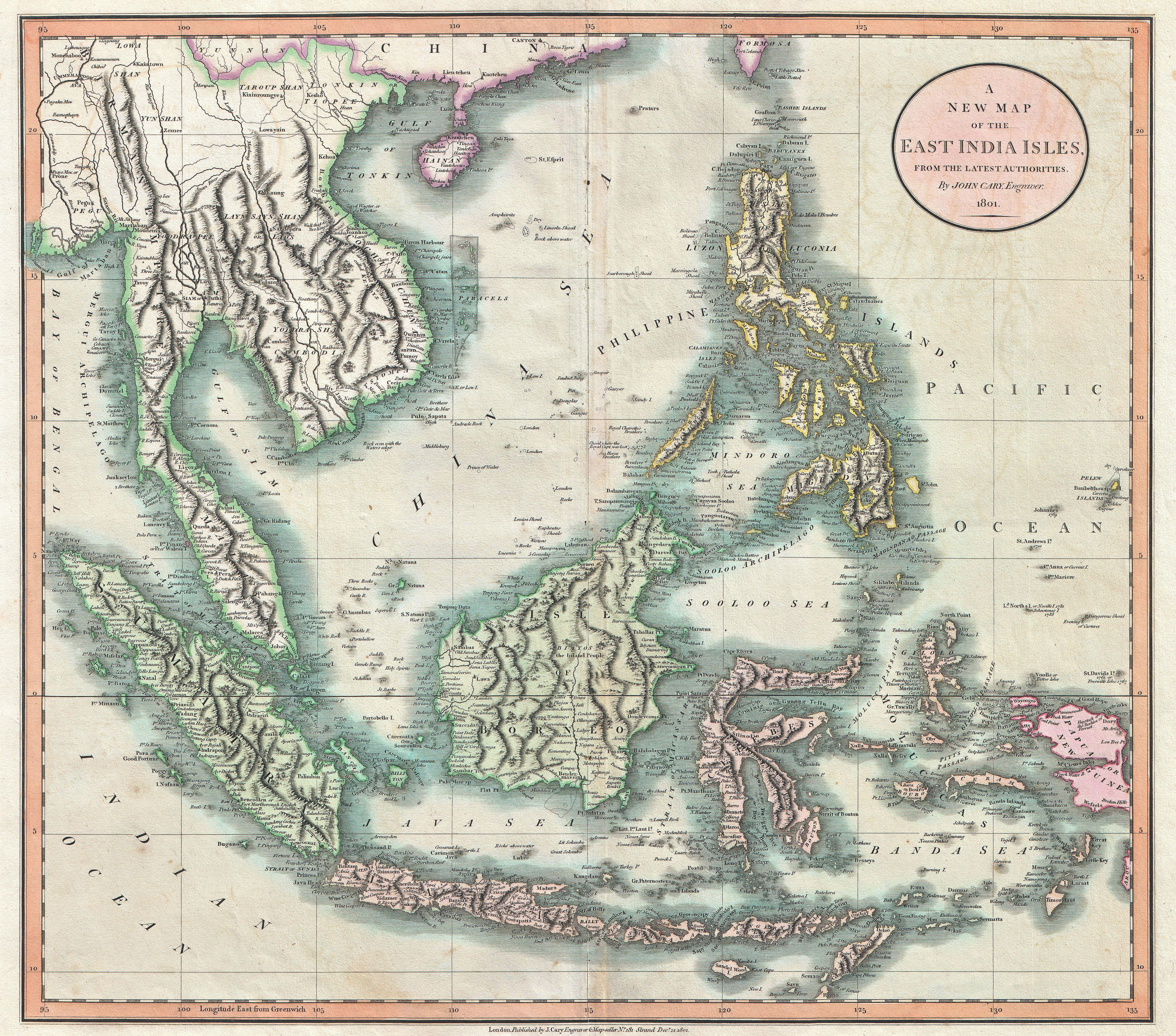
An 1801 map of the East Indies Isles which shows the placement of the Spratly Islands. Most of the names have changed since then.

The Republic of the Philippines claims the Spratly islands and are based on sovereignty over the Spratly Islands on the issues of res nullius and geography.

==== Basis for the Philippine claim ====
When the Philippines gained independence in 1946, the Philippine nationalists wanted to claim the Spratly Islands. The American advisors, however, discouraged them due to the fact that the Spanish-American Treaty of 1898 clearly stipulated that the western limit of the Philippine islands did not include the Spratlys. The Americans did not want to bring conflict with the Chiang Kai-shek regime in China.

The Philippines contend their claim was res nullius as there was no effective sovereignty over the islands until the 1930s when France and then Japan acquired the islands. When Japan renounced their sovereignty over the islands according to the San Francisco Treaty, there was a relinquishment of the right to the islands without any special beneficiary. Therefore, the islands became res nullius and available for annexation, according to the claim.

In 1956, a private Filipino citizen, Tomás Cloma, unilaterally declared a state on 53 features in the South China Sea, calling it "Freedomland". In December 1974, Cloma was arrested and forced to sign a document to convey to the Philippines whatever rights he might have had in the territory for one peso. Cloma sold his claim to the Philippine government, which annexed (de jure) the islands in 1978, calling them Kalayaan. On 11 June 1978, President Ferdinand Marcos of the Philippines issued Presidential decree No. 1596, declaring the Spratly Islands (referred to therein as the Kalayaan Island Group) as Philippine territory.

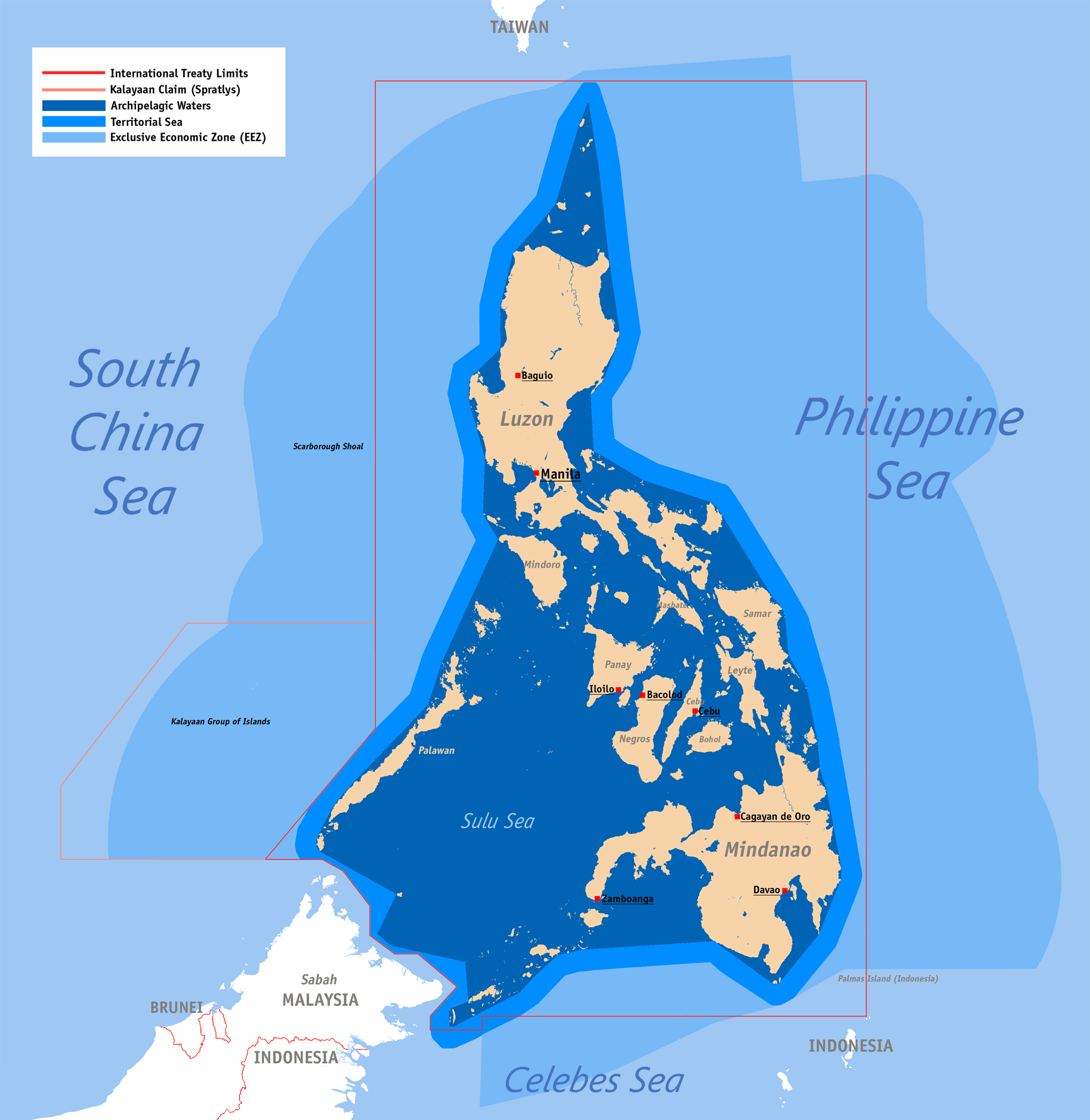
Territorial map claimed by the Philippines, showing internal waters, territorial sea, international treaty limits and exclusive economic zone.

The Philippine claim to Kalayaan on a geographical basis can be summarised using the assertion that Kalayaan is distinct from other island groups in the South China Sea, because of the size of the biggest island in the Kalayaan group. A second argument used by the Philippines regarding their geographical claim over the Spratlys is that all the islands claimed by the Philippines lie within its 200-mile exclusive economic zone according to the 1982 United Nations Convention on the Law of the Sea. This argument assumes that the islands were res nullius. The Republic of the Philippines also contend, under maritime law that the People's Republic of China can not extend its baseline claims to the Spratlys because the PRC is not an archipelagic state.

=== Vietnam ===
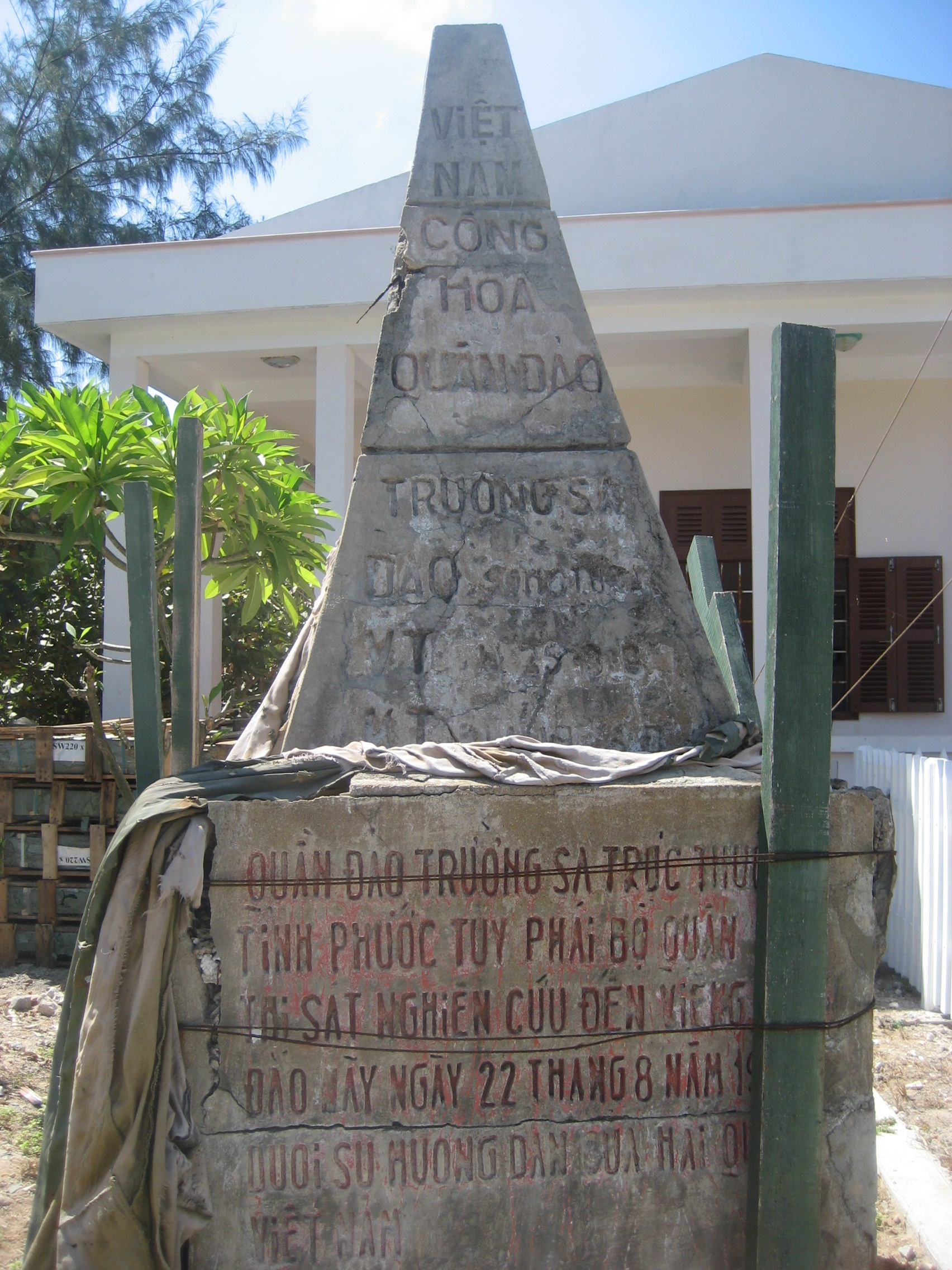
Territorial monument of the Republic of Vietnam (South Vietnam) on Southwest Cay, Spratly Islands, defining the cay as part of Vietnamese territory (to Phước Tuy province). Used from 22 August 1956 until 1975, when replaced by another one from the Socialist Republic of Vietnam (successor state after the Fall of Saigon)

On 25 July 1994, Vietnam ratified the UNCLOS. Upon ratification it declared:

The National Assembly reiterates Viet Nam's sovereignty over the Hoang Sa and Truong Sa archipelagoes and its position to settle those disputes relating to territorial claims as well as other disputes in the Eastern Sea through peaceful negotiations in the spirit of equality, mutual respect and understanding, and with due respect of international law, particularly the 1982 United Nations Convention on the Law of the Sea, and of the sovereign rights and jurisdiction of the coastal States over their respective continental shelves and exclusive economic zones

Vietnam's response to China's claim is that Chinese records on Qianli Changsha and Wanli Shitang are records about non-Chinese territories. For example, Qianli Changsha and Wanli Shitang were referred to in the ancient Chinese texts Ling Wai Dai Da and Zhu Fan Zhi as being in the Sea of Jiaozhi, Jiaozhi being the old name for a Chinese province in modern-day northern Vietnam, or as writings on foreign countries.

Vietnam's view is that the Chinese records do not constitute the declaration and exercise of sovereignty and that China did not declare sovereignty over the Spratlys until after World War II.

==== Basis of Vietnam's claim ====
Vietnam claims the Spratlys based on international law on declaring and exercising sovereignty.

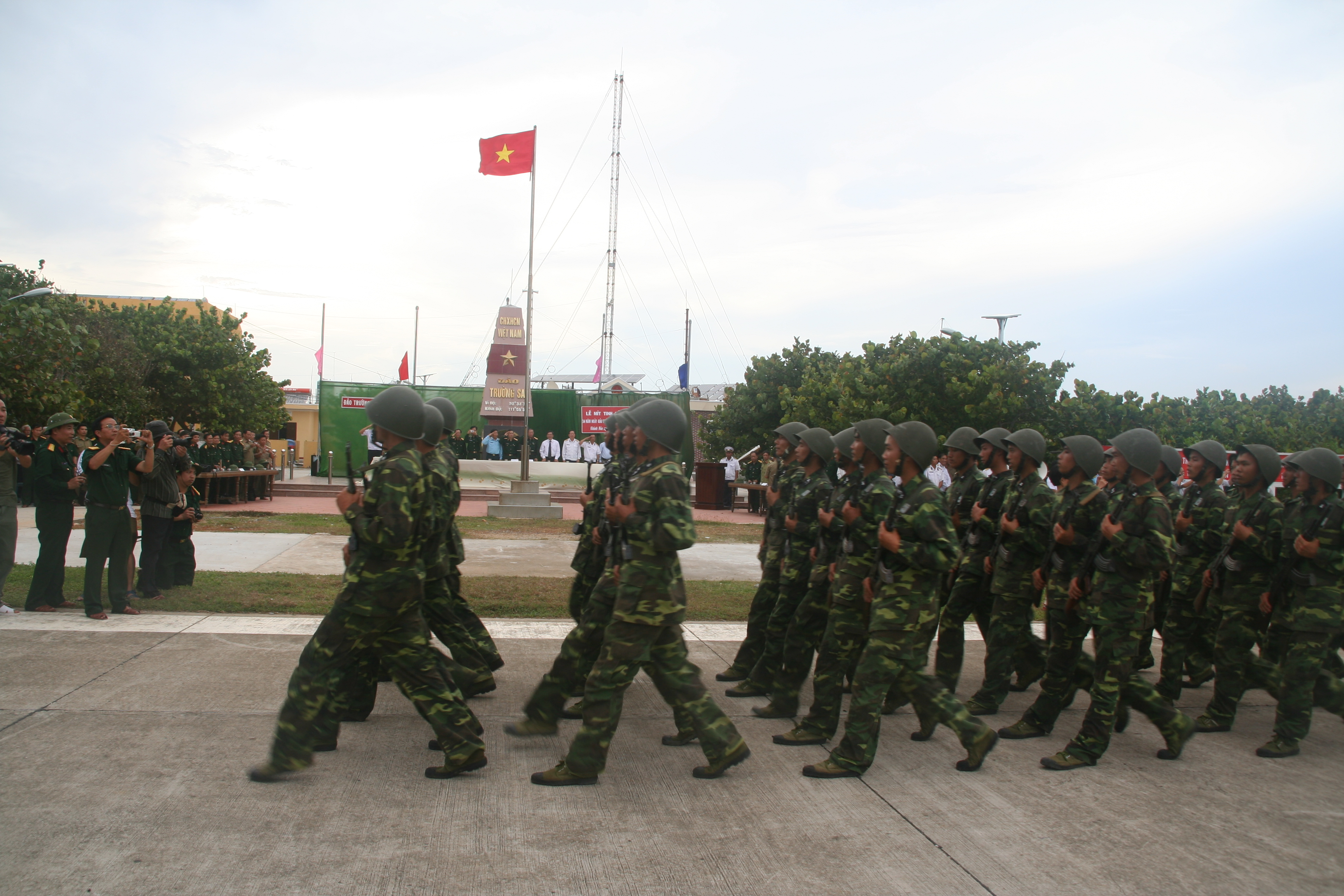
Vietnam People's Navy Naval Infantry marching on Spratly Island

Vietnam claims that it has occupied the Spratly and the Paracel islands at least since the 17th century, when they were not under the sovereignty of any state, and that they exercised sovereignty over the two archipelagos continuously and peacefully until they were invaded by Chinese armed forces. In Phủ biên tạp lục (撫邊雜錄, Miscellaneous Records of Pacification in the Border Area) by the scholar Lê Quý Đôn, Hoàng Sa (Paracel Islands), and Trường Sa (Spratly Islands) were defined as belonging to Quảng Ngãi District. In Đại Nam nhất thống toàn đồ (大南ー統全圖), an atlas of Vietnam completed in 1838, Trường Sa was shown as Vietnamese territory. Vietnam had conducted many geographical and resource surveys of the islands. The results of these surveys have been recorded in Vietnamese literature and history published since the 17th century. After the treaty signed with the Nguyễn dynasty, France represented Vietnam in international affairs and exercised sovereignty over the islands.

The Cairo Declaration, drafted by the Allies and China towards the end of World War II, listed the territories that the Allies intended to strip from Japan and return to China. Despite China being among the authors of the declaration, this list did not include the Spratlys. Vietnam's response to China's claim that the Cairo Declaration somehow recognised the latter's sovereignty over the Spratlys is that it has no basis in fact.

At the San Francisco Conference on the peace treaty with Japan, the Soviet Union proposed that the Paracels and Spratlys be recognised as belonging to China. This proposal was rejected by an overwhelming majority of the delegates. On 7 July 1951, Tran Van Huu, head of the Bảo Đại Government's (State of Vietnam) delegation to the conference declared that the Paracels and Spratlys were part of Vietnamese territory. This declaration met with no challenge from the 51 representatives at the conference. North Vietnam, however, supported China's authority. The final text of the Treaty of San Francisco did not name any recipient of the Spratlys.

The Geneva Accords, which China was a signatory, settled the First Indochina War end. French Indochina was split into three countries: Laos, Cambodia and Vietnam. Vietnam was to be temporarily divided along the 17th Parallel.

Chapter I, Article 4 states:

The provisional military demarcation line between the two final regrouping zones is extended into the territorial waters by a line perpendicular to the general line of the coast. All coastal islands north of this boundary shall be evacuated by the armed forces of the French Union, and all islands south of it shall be evacuated by the forces of the People's Army of Viet-Nam.

On 26 October 1955, the Republic of Vietnam "South Vietnam" replaced the State of Vietnam (part of the French Union) and inherit of its rights. The Vietnamese government's Vietnam United Youth League, which runs the newspaper Thanh Niên News, claims that although, nothing was said explicitly about offshore archipelagos, which was of small interest by that times, it was clearly understood by all the parties that the Republic of Vietnam inherit of all the French Indochina's Vietnamese territories under the 17th Parallel. As the Paracel and the Spratly archipelagos (which lay below the 17th parallel) were part of the French Indochina since 1933, they were part of "South Vietnam" territory. The French bestowed its titles, rights, and claims over the two island chains to the Republic of Vietnam.

The Republic of Vietnam (RVN) exercised sovereignty over the islands, by placing border markers on the Spratlys to indicate South Vietnamese sovereignty over the archipelago. Up to the end of the Vietnam War the Republic of Vietnam Navy held military control over the majority of the Spratly Islands until 1975, when North Vietnamese troops attacked South Vietnamese troops and occupied the islands. After the Vietnam War, the unified Vietnam SRV (Socialist Republic of Vietnam) continued to claim the Spratly islands as an indisputably integral part of Vietnam.

The islands occupied by Vietnam are organised as a district of Khánh Hòa Province. According to the 2009 census, the Trường Sa District has a population of 195 people. At the 12th National Assembly (2007–2011) Election held early in Trường Sa, the people and soldiers also voted for their local district government for the first time. For the first time, Trường Sa is organised like a normal inland district, with a township (Trường Sa) and two communes (Sinh Tồn and Song Tử Tây). Forty nine people were elected to the communes' people's councils. In July 2012 the National Assembly of Vietnam passed a law demarcating Vietnamese sea borders to include the Spratly and Paracel Islands.

Champa historically had a large presence in the South China Sea. The Vietnamese broke Champa's power in an invasion of Champa in 1471, and then finally conquered the last remnants of the Cham people in a war in 1832. The Vietnamese government fears that using the evidence of Champa's historical connection to the disputed islands in the South China Sea would expose the human rights violations and killings of ethnic minorities in Vietnam such as in the 2001 and 2004 uprisings, and lead to the issue of Cham autonomy being brought to attention.

===== 2014 China-Vietnam oil rig crisis and controversy over Phạm Văn Đồng's 1958 letter =====
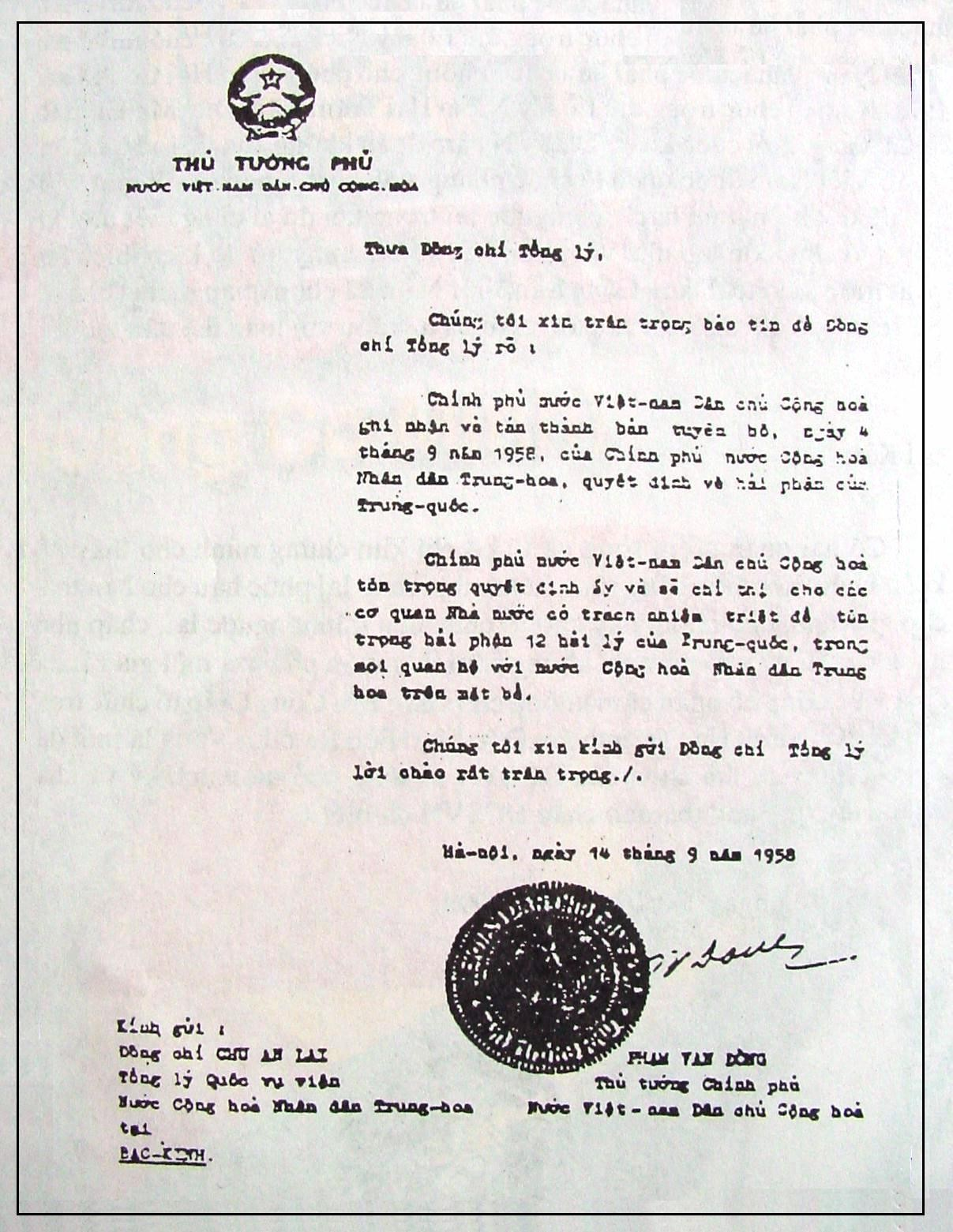
The letter sent by PM Phạm Văn Đồng of North Vietnam to Chinese premier Zhou Enlai in 1958 regarding the 12-nautical mile breadth of China's territorial waters.

During the Hai Yang Shi You 981 standoff, also known as the 2014 China-Vietnam oil rig crisis near the Paracel Islands China has produced a letter written by North Vietnam's former prime minister Phạm Văn Đồng in 1958 as proof that it holds sovereignty over the Paracel and Spratly islands. The Vietnamese newspaper Thanh Niên News claims China has intentionally misrepresented the letter, which contains no direct reference to either island chain. In addition, they claim that China is ignoring the spirit and time in which the letter was written. During that time, the two communist neighbours shared extremely close ties and the US navy was patrolling the Taiwan Strait, threatening them both. The letter, according to the newspaper, represented a diplomatic gesture of goodwill that has no legal relevance to the current territorial dispute.

On 4 September 1958, with the seventh fleet of the US Navy patrolling the Taiwan Strait, China announced its decision to extend the breadth of its territorial waters to 12 nautical miles. The United Nations (to which China was not yet a member) had just held its first Conference on the Law of the Sea in Switzerland in 1956, and the resulting treaties, including the Convention on the Territorial Sea and the Contiguous Zone, were signed in 1958. Though the UN conference was considered a success, it left the exact breadth of each nation's territorial waters somewhat unresolved; the US, for instance, said it should extend just three nautical miles.

On 14 September 1958, North Vietnam's PM Phạm Văn Đồng wrote a letter to PM Zhou Enlai in response to China's declaration.

Original

Thưa Đồng chí Tổng lý,

Chúng tôi xin trân trọng báo tin để Đồng chí Tổng lý rõ:

Chính phủ nước Việt Nam Dân chủ Cộng hòa ghi nhận và tán thành bản tuyên bố, ngày 4 tháng 9 năm 1958, của Chính phủ nước Cộng hoà Nhân dân Trung Hoa, quyết định về hải phận của Trung Quốc.

Chính phủ nước Việt Nam Dân chủ Cộng hòa tôn trọng quyết định ấy và sẽ chỉ thị cho các cơ quan Nhà nước có trách nhiệm triệt để tôn trọng hải phận 12 hải lý của Trung Quốc trong mọi quan hệ với nước Cộng hoà Nhân dân Trung Hoa trên mặt biển.

Chúng tôi xin kính gửi Đồng chí Tổng lý lời chào rất trân trọng.

English

Dear Comrade Prime Minister,

We solemnly inform you that the Government of the Democratic Republic of Vietnam acknowledges and supports the declaration dated September 4th, 1958 by the Government of the People's Republic of China regarding the decision on the breadth of China's territorial sea.

The Government of the Democratic Republic of Vietnam respects that decision and will direct its state agencies to absolutely respect the 12-nautical mile breadth of China's territorial sea in all the relations with People's Republic of China at sea.

Respectfully yours,

The Vietnamese newspaper Thanh Nien News claims that the letter has no legal relevance in China's sovereignty claims to the Paracel and Spratly archipelagos for the three following reasons:

- Point 1: The Democratic Republic of Vietnam (North Vietnam) was not in control of the Paracel and the Spratly archipelagos at the time PM Dong wrote his letter.
- Point 2: The Constitutions of 1946 and 1957 of the Democratic Republic of Vietnam stipulated that territorial transfers must be decided by an act of parliament, the most powerful body in the country. As such, the prime minister had no right to relinquish the islands.
- Point 3: PM Phạm Văn Đồng's letter is a unilateral declaration written solely as a response to China's declaration on a 12 nautical mile territorial waters. The letter makes no mention, whatsoever, of territorial sovereignty over any archipelago.

== International law ==
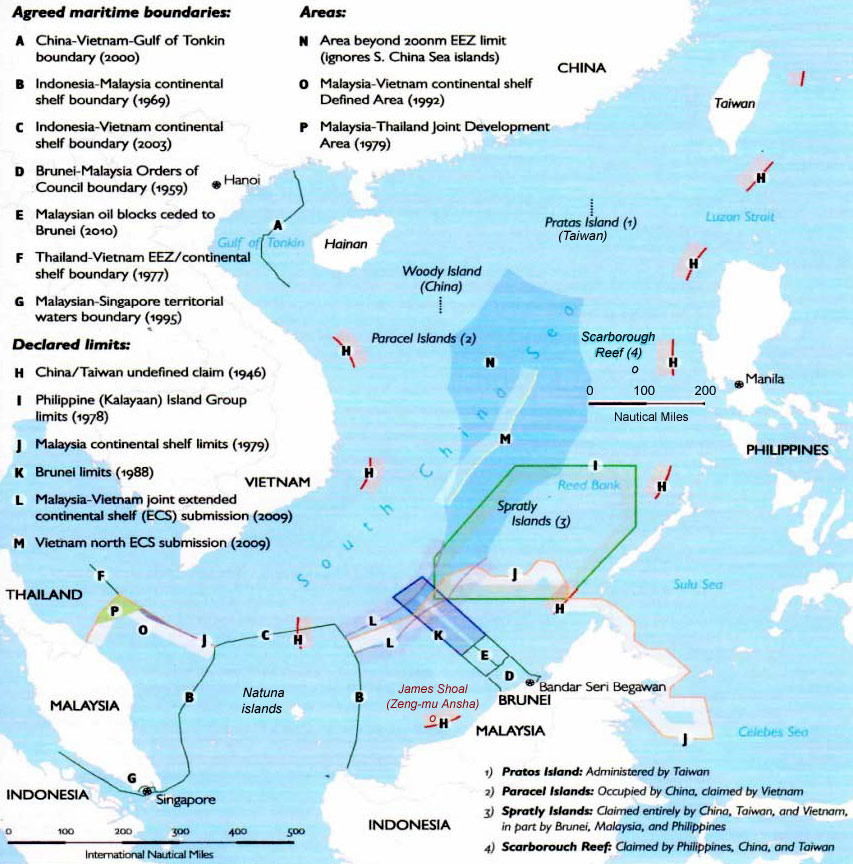
South China Sea claims and agreements.

=== Doctrine of intertemporal law ===
The doctrine of intertemporal law was established after the Island of Palmas Case ruling. Under the doctrine, treaty rights are assessed under the laws in force at the time the treaty is made, not at the time a dispute takes place.

=== Law on inhabited vs uninhabited territories ===
International law on claims differ if the territory is inhabited or uninhabited. In the 1928 Island of Palmas case, for inhabited territories, the court stated that "although continuous in principle, sovereignty cannot be exercised in fact at every moment on every point of a territory. The intermittence and discontinuity compatible with the maintenance of the right necessarily differ according as inhabited or inhabited regions are involved, or region enclosed within territories in which sovereignty is incontestably displayed or again regions accessible from, for instance, the high seas." For uninhabited territories, the 1931 Clipperton Island case ruled that "if a territory, by virtue of the fact it was completely uninhabited, is, from the first moment when the occupying state makes its appearance there, at the absolute and undisputed disposition of that state, from the moment the taking of possession must be considered as accomplished, and the occupation is thereby completed. Xxx [T]the fact that [France] has not exercised her authority there in a positive manner does not imply the forfeiture of an acquisition already definitely perfected." The ruling was affirmed in the 1933 Eastern Greenland case.

=== Critical date doctrine ===
In the Eastern Greenland Case between Norway and Denmark, the critical date doctrine was established. It was ruled by the Permanent Court of International Justice (PCIJ) that the Norwegian proclamation on July 10, 1931, annexing Eastern Greenland was the "critical date" in that specific case.

=== Uti possidetis juris ===
Under the principle of uti possidetis juris, the boundaries of former colonies must be respected by all states. It was established after the Frontier Dispute case between Burkina Faso and Mali. The ICJ ruled that uti possidetis juris is a "general principle, which is logically connected with the phenomenon of the obtaining of independence, wherever it occurs. Its obvious purpose is to prevent the independence and stability of new States being endangered by fratricidal struggles provoked by the challenging of frontiers following the withdrawal of the administering power…Its purpose, at the time of the achievement of independence by the former Spanish colonies of America, was to scotch any designs which non-American colonizing powers might have on regions which had been assigned by the former metropolitan State to one division or another, but which were still uninhabited or unexplored."

=== Maps in international law claims ===
Maps cannot establish title to territory unless it is attached to a treaty. Moreover, maps unilaterally produced by a state, even if not attached to a treaty, can bind the producing state if it is "adverse to its interest". This was established in the 2002 Delimitation of the Border between the State of Eritrea and Ethiopia case, and was affirmed further in the Pedra Blanca arbitration between Malaysia and Singapore in 2008, when the ICJ ruled: "The map still stands as a statement of geographical fact, especially when the State adversely affected has itself produced and disseminated it, even against its own interest."

=== Extended continental shelf claims, 2009 ===
Via UNCLOS, the United Nations provided for countries with coastlines to submit claims to the UN's Commission on the Limits of the Continental Shelf (CLCS) for their continental shelf to be extended beyond 200 nautical miles of their shores. By 13 May 2009, a total of 48 nations made full claims, and dozens more made preliminary submissions. Two of the submissions made to the CLCS addressed claims in the South China Sea (SCS) – one by Vietnam for a claim over the northern portion of the SCS (which included the Paracel Islands), and another jointly by Vietnam and Malaysia for a joint claim over a "defined area" in the middle of the SCS between the two countries, which included part of the Spratly Islands. Brunei made a preliminary submission notifying of its intention to claim a continental shelf beyond 200 nautical miles from its shores.

China (PRC) immediately issued protests over the two submissions and called on the United Nations not to consider them. It also issued a stern warning to countries not to claim the islands which it said were its sovereign territory.

=== Philippine protests to ITLOS, 2011 ===
On 23 May 2011, Former Philippine President Benigno Aquino III warned the visiting Chinese defense minister Liang Guanglie of a possible arms race in the region if tensions worsened over disputes in the South China Sea. In March, the Philippines complained that Chinese patrol boats had harassed a Philippine oil exploration vessel in disputed waters near the Spratlys, and subsequently filed a formal protest at the International Tribunal for the Law of the Sea (ITLOS).

==== Arbitration tribunal, 2013–2016 ====
The South China Sea Arbitration (Philippines v. China, PCA case number 2013–19) was an arbitration case brought by the Republic of the Philippines against the People's Republic of China (PRC) under Annex VII (subject to Part XV) of the United Nations Convention on the Law of the Sea (UNCLOS, ratified by the Philippines in 1984, by the PRC in 1996, opted out from Section 2 of Part XV by China in 2006) concerning certain issues in the South China Sea, including the nine-dash line introduced by the mainland-based Republic of China since as early as 1947. A tribunal of arbitrators appointed the Permanent Court of Arbitration (PCA) as the registry for the proceedings.

On 19 February 2013, China declared that it would not participate in the arbitration. On 7 December 2014, it published a white paper to elaborate its position that, among other points, the tribunal lacks jurisdiction. In accordance with Article 3 of Annex VII of UNCLOS, the Philippines appointed 1 of the 5 arbitrators, while China did not appoint any. On 29 October 2015, the tribunal concluded that it had jurisdiction to consider seven of the Philippines' submissions, subject to certain conditions, and postponed the consideration of its jurisdiction on the other eight submissions to the merits phase.

On 12 July 2016, the arbitral tribunal ruled in favor of the Philippines on most of its submissions. It clarified that while it would not "rule on any question of sovereignty ... and would not delimit any maritime boundary", China's historic rights claims over maritime areas (as opposed to land masses and territorial waters) within the "nine-dash line" have no lawful effect unless entitled to under UNCLOS. China has rejected the ruling, as has Taiwan. As of November 2023, 26 governments support the ruling, 17 issued generally positive statements noting the ruling but not called for compliance, and eight rejected it. The United Nations does not hold any position on the case or on the disputed claims.

== Diplomacy ==
=== 1992 ASEAN Declaration on the South China Sea ===
On 22 July 1992, ASEAN issued a declaration on the South China Sea, emphasising that the dispute should be solved peacefully without resorting to violence.

=== Declaration on the Conduct of Parties in the South China Sea, 2002 ===
On 4 November 2002 in Phnom Penh, the Declaration on the Conduct of Parties in the South China Sea was signed by the 10 foreign ministers of ASEAN countries and China (PRC). The parties explicitly undertook in this declaration, "to resolve their territorial and jurisdictional disputes by peaceful means, without resorting to the threat or use of force, through friendly consultations and negotiations by sovereign states directly concerned".

=== Code of Conduct in the South China Sea ===
In July 2012, China (PRC) announced that it is open to launching discussions on the Code of Conduct in the South China Sea, but called for all parties to exercise self-restraint in keeping with the spirit of previous declarations and United Nation conventions. This announcement has been criticised by many neighbouring states because of the contradictions seen in the Scarborough Shoal at that time where China has established de facto control.

== History of the Spratly Islands ==
From approximately 500 BC to 100 AD, shipping routes of the Sa Huynh-Kalanay trading network traversed the South China Sea. They were used to exchange pottery and jewelry (such as jade) across Taiwan, the Philippines, and Borneo.

In 1734, the Carta Hydrographica y Chorographica de las Islas Filipinas (commonly referred as the Velarde map) was published by the Spanish colonial government. According to Philippine judge Antonio Carpio, the map shows Philippine sovereignty over the Spratly Islands (referred as Los Bajos de Paragua) and is the earliest map showing sovereignty over the said territories. Philippine officials and writers also assert that the 1808 and 1875 editions of Carita General del Archipelago Filipino, published by the Spanish colonial government, included the Spratly islands as sovereign territory of the Philippines and was recognized by the international community.

In the 19th century, Europeans found that Chinese fishermen from Hainan annually sojourned on the Spratly islands for part of the year specifically for trade, which was also common for other ethnic groups in the area such as the Cham of Vietnam and the people of Palawan, Sulu, and Luzon in the Philippines. In 1877, the British laid a claim to two Spratly islands and dispatched an expedition group there after learning of the presence of guano from locals in British-colonized Borneo. However, the group forgot to plant the British flag after the white businesspersons and their Chinese employees attacked one another due to a dispute.

When the Spratlys and Paracels were being surveyed by Germany in 1883, China issued protests against them.

After the Spanish-American War, Spain ceded the territory of the Philippines to the United States through the 1898 Treaty of Paris. The treaty lines drawn were inaccurate, leading to the Spanish to retain sovereign control over the Spratly Islands, Scarborough Shoal, and parts of Tawi-Tawi. According to the Philippine government, this was later rectified retroactively in the 1900 Treaty of Washington where the mentioned remaining territories were formally ceded to the United States and their interpretation is that this was as part of the territory of the Philippines at their independence.

In 1930 a French vessel formally laid claims to an area of the Spratlys without naming any specific island in order to avoid any overlap with the Philippine territory as defined in 1898. The French were unaware of Britain's earlier claim. After a series of internal debates, British officials decided not to push their claims due to disagreements over how important the Spratlys were, a perceived weakness of their claim from not following up on it since 1877, and their wish for France to act as a buffer in the South China Sea against growing threats to the British from Japan.

Between April 7, 1933, and April 13, 1933, France took possession of the Spratly Islands and notification of the occupation appeared in the Official Journal of July 26, 1933. France claimed the Spratlys for the French Union, rather than as part of Indochina (and its successor Vietnam). China protested.

The Spratlys and the Paracels were conquered by Japan in 1939. Japan annexed the Spratly Islands via Taiwanese jurisdiction as part of Kaohsiung on 30 March 1939. France and UK protested and reasserted French sovereignty.

China Handbook 1937–1943: A comprehensive survey of major developments in China in six years of war was published by the Republic of China in 1943 and stated its southernmost territory as "Triton Island of the Paracel Group". China Handbook 1937–1945, a revised edition covering the entire Second Sino-Japanese War, claimed that the Spratly islands were contested among China, the Philippines, and Indochina. The Paracels and Spratlys were handed over to Republic of China control from Japan after the 1945 surrender of Japan, since the Allied powers assigned the Republic of China to receive Japanese surrenders in that area.

The Republic of China garrisoned Itu Aba (Taiping) island in 1946 and posted Chinese flags and markers on it along with Woody island in the Paracels, France tried, but failed to make them leave Woody island. The aim of the Republic of China was to block the French claims.

In 1947, the Republic of China drew up the map showing the U-shaped claim on the entire South China Sea, showing the Spratly and Paracels in Chinese territory. In 1947, the ROC government renamed 159 islands in the area and published the Map of the South China Sea Islands. The ROC has occupied Taiping Island, the largest island in the Spratlys, constantly since 1956.

After pulling out its garrison in 1950 when the Republic of China evacuated to Taiwan, when the Filipino Tomas Cloma uprooted an ROC flag on Itu Aba laid claim to the Spratlys and, the Republic of China (now Taiwan) again regarrisoned Itu Aba in 1956.

Taiwan's garrison from 1946 to 1950 and 1956-now on Itu Aba represents an "effective occupation" of the Spratlys. China established a coastal defence system against Japanese pirates or smugglers. During the San Francisco Peace Conference of 1951, the San Francisco Peace Treaty was signed. During the conference, the USSR motioned for the Paracels and the Spratly to be awarded to China, but the motion was rejected by a vote of 46 to 3, with one abstention.

In 1953, the French Foreign Ministry declared that the Spratlys were "not attached to Vietnam in 1949, when the former colony of Conchinchina was ceded to this Associated State. They (Spratlys) therefore depend on (administered by) the Ministry of Overseas France." In 1955, the French Foreign Ministry prepared another "Note" that "beyond doubt that the Spratlys belonged to the French Union, not Vietnam."

North Vietnam recognised China's claims on the Paracels and Spratlys during the Vietnam War as it was being supported by China. Only after winning the war and conquering South Vietnam did North Vietnam retract its recognition and admitted it recognised them as part of China to receive aid from China in fighting the Americans.

The Philippines claimed the Spratlys in 1971 under President Marcos, after Taiwanese troops attacked and shot at a Philippine fishing boat on Itu Aba.

Under President Lee Teng-hui, Taiwan stated that "legally, historically, geographically, or in reality", all of the South China Sea and Spratly islands were Taiwan's territory and under Taiwanese sovereignty, and denounced actions undertaken there by Malaysia and the Philippines, in a statement on 13 July 1999 released by the foreign ministry of Taiwan. Taiwan and China's claims "mirror" each other; during international talks involving the Spratly islands, China and Taiwan have cooperated with each other since both have the same claims.

Taiwan and China are largely strategically aligned on the Spratly islands issue, since they both claim exactly the same area, so Taiwan's control of Itu Aba (Taiping) island is viewed as an extension of China's claim. Taiwan and China both claim the entire island chain, while all the other claimants only claim portions of them. China has proposed co-operation with Taiwan against all the other countries claiming the islands. Taiwanese lawmakers have demanded that Taiwan fortify Itu Aba (Taiping) island with weapons to defend against the Vietnamese, and both China and Taiwanese NGOs have pressured Taiwan to expand Taiwan's military capabilities on the island, which played a role in Taiwan expanding the island's runway in 2012. China has urged Taiwan to co-operate and offered Taiwan a share in oil and gas resources while shutting out all the other rival claimants. Taiwanese lawmakers have complained about repeated Vietnamese aggression and trespassing on Taiwan's Itu Aba (Taiping), and Taiwan has started viewing Vietnam as an enemy over the Spratly Islands, not China. Taiwan's state run oil company CPC Corp's board director Chiu Yi has called Vietnam as the "greatest threat" to Taiwan. Taiwan's airstrip on Taiping has irritated Vietnam. China views Taiwan's expansion of its military and airstrip on Taiping as benefiting China's position against the other rival claimants from southeast Asian countries.

In 1990, China published the first volume of its "An Atlas of Ancient Maps of China" through the Cultural Relics Publishing House, Beijing, a publishing arm of the State Bureau of Cultural Relics of China. The second volume was published in 1994, while the third and final volume was published in 1997. The ancient maps in all three volumes showed Hainan as the southernmost territory of any of the dynasties of China.

Malaysia has militarily occupied three islands that it considers to be within its continental shelf. Swallow Reef (Layang Layang / Terumbu Layang / Pulau Layang Layang) was under control in 1983 and has been turned into an island through a land reclamation which now also hosts a dive resort. The Malaysian military also occupies Ardasier Reef (Terumbu Ubi), and Mariveles Reef (Terumbu Mantanani).

Since 1992, Malaysia and Vietnam have agreed to jointly develop areas around these disputed islands. Malaysia has said that it is monitoring all of the actions made by countries involved in the dispute.

Taiwan performed live fire military exercises on Taiping island in September 2012; reports said that Vietnam was explicitly named by the Taiwanese military as the "imaginary enemy" in the drill. Vietnam protested against the exercises as violation of its territory and "voiced anger", demanding that Taiwan stop the drill. Among the inspectors of the live fire drill were Taiwanese national legislators, adding to the tensions.

In 2010, it was reported that the former Malaysian prime minister Mahathir Mohamad believed Malaysia could profit from China's economic growth through co-operation with China, and said that China "was not a threat to anyone and was not worried about aggression from China", as well accusing the United States of provoking China and trying to turn China's neighbours against China. Malaysian authorities displayed no concern over China conducting a military exercise at James Shoal in March 2013, However, until present Malaysia still maintained a balance relations with the countries involved in this dispute. But since China has start encroaching its territorial waters, Malaysia has become active in condemning China.

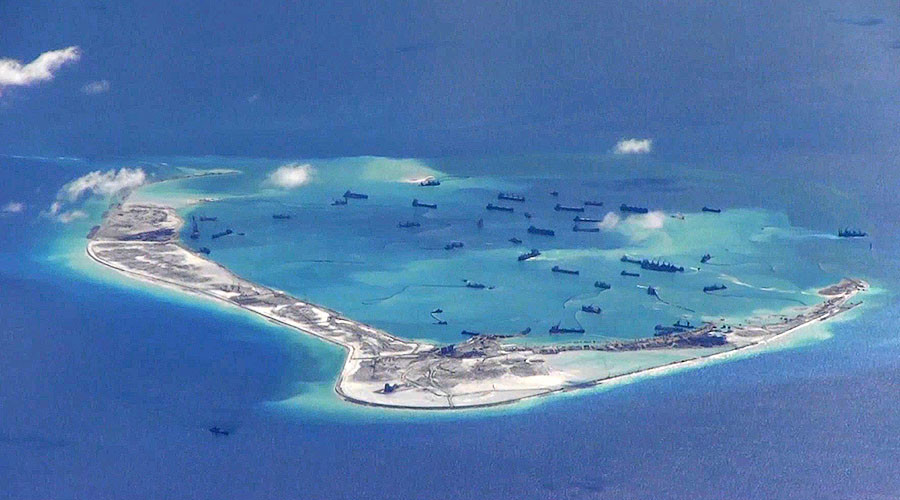
Subi Reef being built up into an artificial island, 2015

In 2014 Janes reported that during 2013–2014 China had begun dredging and land reclamation at three sites in the Spratlys. In contrast to the construction projections of other countries, Beijing's efforts involved reefs that for the most part were under water at high tide. Harry Harris, Pacific fleet commander of the U.S. Navy, unofficially described the project as "Great Wall of Sand" in March 2015.

In April 2015, satellite images showed that China was constructing an airfield at Fiery Cross Reef. By September, it had completed a 3125-metre runway.

== Notable confrontations ==
- Southwest Cay Invasion (1975)
- East Sea Campaign (April 1975)
- Johnson South Reef Skirmish (14 March 1988)
- Scarborough Shoal standoff (commenced on 8 April 2012)
- Hai Yang Shi You 981 standoff (2014)

== Timeline of other events ==
1734
The Velarde map was published, showing the Spratly islands and the Scarborough shoal as part of the Philippines territory, according to justice Antonio Carpio.
1870
British naval captain James George Meads established the micronation The Republic of Morac-Songhrati-Meads.
1883
When the Spratlys and Paracels were being surveyed by Germany in 1883, China issued protests.
1887
The 1887 Chinese-Vietnamese Boundary convention signed between France and China after the Sino-French War of 1884–1885, which, according to China, recognised China as the owner of the Spratly and Paracel islands.
1900
Colonial French Indochina asserted that the state Bac Hai Company had exercised Vietnamese sovereignty in the Spratlys since the 18th century.
1927
The French ship SS De Lanessan conducted a scientific survey of the Spratly Islands.
1930
France launched a second expedition with the La Malicieuse, which raised the French flag on an island called Île de la Tempête. Chinese fishermen were present on the island; the French made no attempt to expel them.
1933
Three French ships took control of nine of the largest islands and declared French sovereignty over the archipelago to the great powers including the UK, US, China and Japan, according to the principles found in the Berlin convention. France administered the area as part of Cochinchina.

Japanese companies applied to the French authority in Cochinchina for phosphate-mining licenses in the Spratlys.

1939
The Empire of Japan disputed French sovereignty over the islands, claiming that Japan was the first country to discover the islands. Japan declared its intention to place the island group under its jurisdiction. France and the United Kingdom protested and reasserted French sovereignty claims.
1941
Japan forcibly occupied the island group and remained in control until the end of World War II, administering the area as part of Taiwan.

Japan established a submarine base on Itu Aba Island.

1945
After Japan's surrender at the end of World War II, the Republic of China claimed the Paracel and Spratly Islands. The Republic of China sent troops to Itu Aba Island; forces erected sovereignty markers and named it Taiping Island.
1946
France dispatched warships to the islands several times, but no attempts were made to evict Chinese forces.
1947
China produced a map with 9 undefined dotted lines, and claimed all of the islands within those lines. France demanded the Chinese withdraw from the islands.
1948
France ceased maritime patrols near the islands and China withdrew most of its troops.
1951
At the 1951 San Francisco Conference on the Peace Treaty with Japan, the Soviet Union proposed that the Spratlys belonged to China. The delegates overwhelmingly rejected this suggestion. The delegates from Vietnam, which at that time was a French protectorate, declared sovereignty over the Paracel and the Spratly Islands, which was not opposed by any delegate at the conference. China did not attend the conference and was not a signatory of the treaty.
1956
On 15 June 1956, Vice-Foreign Minister Un Van Khiem of the Democratic Republic of Vietnam received Li Zhimin, Chargé d'Affaires ad interim of the Chinese Embassy in Vietnam, and told him that, "according to Vietnamese data, the Xisha and Nansha Islands are historically part of Chinese territory". Le Loc, acting director of the Asian Department of the Vietnamese Foreign Ministry was present and specifically cited Vietnamese data and pointed out that "judging from history, these islands were already part of China at the time of the Song dynasty".
1956
Tomas Cloma, director of the Maritime Institute of the Philippines, claimed sovereignty over the northwestern two-thirds of the Spratly Islands, naming his territory Kalaya'an ("Freedomland"). The People's Republic of China, the Republic of China, France, South Vietnam, the United Kingdom and the Netherlands all issued protests. The Republic of China and South Vietnam sent naval units to the islands, though South Vietnam left no permanent garrison. Later in the year, South Vietnam declared its annexation of the Spratly Islands as a part of its Phước Tuy province.
1958
The People's Republic of China issued a declaration defining its territorial waters which encompassed the Spratly Islands. North Vietnam's prime minister, Phạm Văn Đồng, sent a formal note to Zhou Enlai, stating that the Government of the Democratic Republic of Vietnam respected the decision on the 12 nautical mile limit of territorial waters. Both the South Vietnamese government and the communist revolutionary movement in South Vietnam continued to assert that the Spratlys belonged to Vietnam.
1961–63
South Vietnam established sovereignty markers on several islands in the chain.
1968
The Philippines sent troops to three islands on the premise of protecting Kalayaan citizens, and announced the annexation of the Kalayaan island group.
1971
Malaysia issued claims to some of the Spratly Islands.
1972
The Philippines incorporated the Kalayaan islands into its Palawan province.
1973
Vietnamese troops were stationed on five islands.
1975
The re-unified Vietnam declared claims over the Spratly Islands.
1978
A presidential decree from the Philippines outlined territorial claims to the Kalayaan portion of the islands.
1979
Malaysia published a map of its continental-shelf claim, which included twelve islands from the Spratly group.

Vietnam published a white paper outlining its claims to the islands and disputing those of the other claimants.

1982
Vietnam published another white paper, occupied several of the islands and constructed military installations.

The Philippines occupied several more islands and constructed an airstrip.

1983
Malaysia occupied Swallow Reef (Layang Layang), in the south of the Spratly Islands. A naval base and diving resort was later built at this location on reclaimed land.
1984
Brunei established an exclusive fishing-zone encompassing the Louisa Reef and neighbouring areas in the southeastern Spratly Islands.
1986
The first Philippine-Vietnam Joint Marine Scientific Research Expedition in the South China Sea was conducted aboard the RPS Explorer.
1987
The People's Republic of China (PRC) conducted naval patrols in the Spratly Islands and established a permanent base.
1988
The Johnson South Reef Skirmish between China and Vietnam occurs. The People's Liberation Army Navy was conducting a survey expedition as part of the UNESCO Intergovernmental Oceanographic Commission global oceanic surveys project when the conflict occurred. Chinese and Vietnamese sources differ on as to who fired the first shot. PLAN forces won and China established control over six significant landmarks, including Johnson South Reef.
1994
The People's Republic of China, Malaysia, and the Philippines sign the United Nations Convention on the Law of the Sea (UNCLOS). History as a legal basis is now not accepted.
1995
The Philippine government revealed that a PRC military structure was being built at the Mischief Reef. Philippine President Fidel Ramos ordered increased patrols of the Philippine-controlled areas; the incident lead to numerous arrests of Chinese fishermen and naval clashes with PLAN vessels.
1999
A Philippine World-War-II-vintage vessel (LT 57 Sierra Madre) was intentionally run aground on Ayungin Shoal, or Second Thomas Shoal. Despite PRC demands for its removal the vessel remains. It has since become one of the most volatile potential flashpoints in the area and is the focal point of many incidents including resupply and blockades.
2008
Taiwan's president became the first head of state from a claimant country to visit the Spratly islands. His visit sparked criticism from other claimants.
2009
The Office of the Philippine President enacted the "Philippine Baselines Law of 2009" (RA 9522). The law classifies the Kalayaan Island Group and the Scarborough Shoal as a "regime of islands under the Republic of the Philippines".

In May, two submissions were made to the UN's Commission on the Limits of the Continental Shelf (CLCS): a joint submission by Malaysia and Vietnam claims jurisdiction over their respective continental shelves out to 200 nautical miles; a submission by Vietnam claims jurisdiction over an extended shelf area. The People's Republic of China and the Philippines both protested the moves, stating that they violated agreements made with regard to the islands.

2011
On 18 May 2011 China Mobile announced that its mobile-phone coverage had expanded to include the Spratly Islands, under the rationale that it can allow soldiers stationed on the islands, fishermen and merchant vessels within the area to use mobile services, and can also provide assistance during storms and sea rescues. The deployment of China Mobile's support over the islands took roughly one year to fulfil.

In May, PRC patrol boats attacked and cut the cables of Vietnamese oil-exploration ships near the Spratly Islands. The incidents sparked several anti-China protests in Vietnam.

2012
On 11 July a Chinese Type 053 frigate, the Dongguan, ran aground on PRC-controlled Mischief Reef, sparking embarrassment for the Chinese government and causing an awkward diplomatic situation. The ship was later towed back to base.
2012
In August, after China established the city of Sansha and garrisoned an island in the Paracels, the United States Senate passed a resolution condemning China's move and calling all parties to refrain from occupying features in the South China Sea until a code of conduct is reached.
2014
On 6 May Philippines police arrested 11 Chinese turtle poachers on board the Qiongqionghai near Half Moon Shoal.
2015
On 20 May the Chinese navy sternly warned a United States P8-A Poseidon, on a surveillance flight over the Fiery Cross Reef, to leave the "Chinese military alert zone". The Pentagon released a video recording of the challenge to CNN amid "growing momentum within the Pentagon and White House for taking concrete steps" in the region.
2016
On 16 February, the imagery from Image Sat International (ISI) showed that the Chinese military had deployed an advanced surface-to-air missile system on one of the contested islands in the South China Sea. It appeared to show the HQ-9 air defense system, which closely resembles Russia's S-300 missile system. The HQ-9 has a range of 125 miles, which would pose a threat to any airplanes, civilians or military, flying close by. This contradicted China's foreign minister's earlier claims that the islands were for humanitarian purposes and his promises to not militarize any of the islands.
2017
In January, Vietnam signed a multibillion-dollar gas deal with the US's ExxonMobil for exploration and to extract gas by 2023 from an area close to the disputed Paracel Islands
2018
In May it was reported that China had quietly installed YJ-12B anti-ship cruise missiles and HQ-9B surface-to-air missile systems on Fiery Cross Reef, Subi Reef and Mischief Reef, again contradicting China's earlier claims of non-militarization.
2021
For several days in March, China massed over 200 fishing vessels near Julian Felipe reef, commonly known as Whitsun reef, mooring them together to prevent moving. China claimed they were seeking shelter, although the Philippine government pointed to "possible overfishing and destruction of the marine environment, as well as risks to safety of navigation" well within the Philippines' exclusive economic zone. The Philippine defense secretary denounced the "provocative action of militarising the area" and the foreign secretary filed a diplomatic protest.
2021
In November, China Coast Guard vessels used water cannons against and blocked two Philippine supply boats, preventing the boats from delivering essential supplies to the Philippine marine forces stationed on the BRP Sierra Madre at Ayungin Shoal.
2022
In November, China confiscated the debris of a Chinese rocket that Philippine forces were towing back to their island. A Philippine military spokeswoman said, "We practise maximum tolerance in such a situation. Since it involved an unidentified object and not a matter of life and death, our team just decided to return."
2023
In February a Chinese Coast Guard ship aimed a military-grade laser at a Philippine ship, causing temporary blindness. The Philippine Coast Guard ship was on a resupply mission to the Sierra Madre.
2023
On 6 August, Chinese Coast Guard ships fired water cannons at a Philippine Coast Guard ship resupplying the Sierra Madre.
2023
On 22 Aug, 6 Sep, 6 Oct, and 10 Nov the Chinese Coast Guard and maritime militia (civilian vessels, often presented as fishing boats, equipped and trained by the government) harassed various Philippine rotation and resupply missions to the Sierra Madre. The US Navy provided support by flying P-8A Poseidons and an Army MQ-9 over the Philippine missions on various occasions.

On 22 Oct a Philippine civilian craft and Coast Guard ship on a resupply mission were damaged upon being hit by Chinese Coast Guard and maritime militia. On 10 Dec a Philippine Coast Guard ship and two civilian vessels were damaged by Chinese water cannons and ramming. One vessel's propulsion was disabled. The Philippine Armed Forces Chief of Staff was on board, prompting concerns about escalation or miscalculation.

2024
On 5 March, Chinese water cannons shattered the front windshield of a Philippine civilian craft on a rotation/resupply mission to the Sierra Madre, injuring for the first time 4 PH Navy sailors. The head of the PH Armed Forces Western Command was also on board. Another PH Coast Guard ship suffered minor collision damage with a Chinese vessel.

On 23 March, Chinese water cannons damaged the hull of a Philippine civilian craft resupplying the Sierra Madre, injuring multiple Philippine sailors and also causing damage to the propulsion. The Chinese also attempted to deploy a barrier around Ayungin Shoal.

2024
On June 17, the Chinese Coast Guard boarded Philippine Marine rigid hull inflatable boats (RHIBs) on a resupply mission to the Sierra Madre and attacked Navy personnel with knives and pickaxes. They also punctured an RHIB and destroyed equipment. Filipino servicemen were under orders to use restraint in order to avoid escalation. Some were injured, with one losing his thumb.

== See also ==
- Great Wall of Sand
- Recto Bank (Reed Bank)
- Senkaku Islands dispute
- Territories claimed by the Philippines
- Territorial disputes of the People's Republic of China
