= Tizard Bank =

Atoll that is part of the Spratly Islands

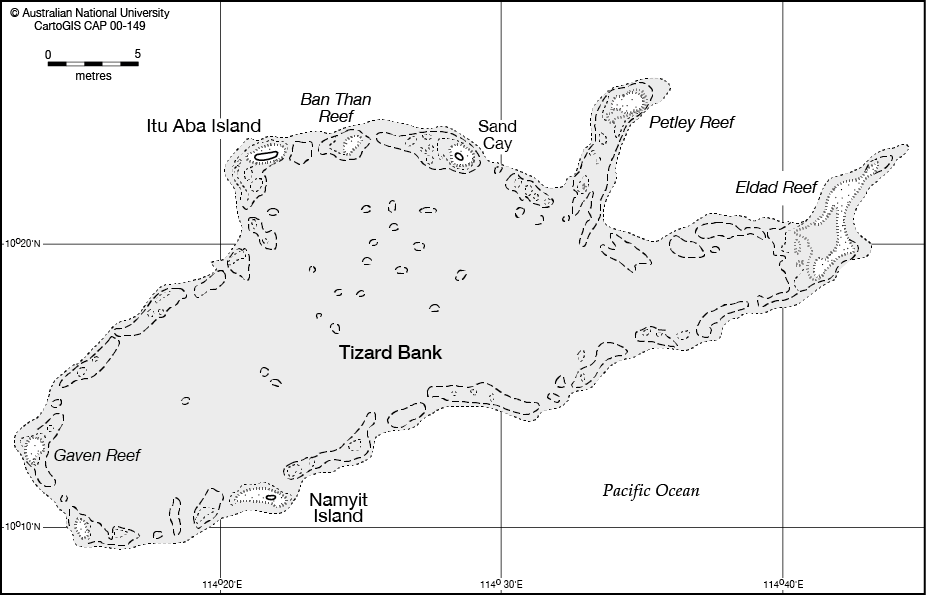

The Tizard Bank, (Filipino: Pampang ng Bayani); (Vietnamese: Cụm Nam Yết); (Chinese: 鄭和群礁; pinyin: Zhènghé Qúnjiāo), 10°15′N 114°30′E is a partially sunken atoll and one of the significant maritime features of the north-western part of the Spratly Islands. It is claimed by Vietnam, the People's Republic of China (PRC), and the Republic of China (ROC), and various parts of it are occupied by these states.

It was named after Thomas Henry Tizard (1839 – 17 February 1924), a British oceanographer and surveyor who surveyed the bank from aboard HMS Rifleman in the 1860s. In 1947 the Republic of China government gave the bank the name Zheng He Archipelago after the famous Ming-era admiral, although there is no evidence that he ever visited Tizard Bank.

From before the 1870s the islands were used by fishermen from Hainan with Itu Aba Island having a semi-permanent settlement of Chinese fishermen.

The bank rises steeply from surrounding depths ranging from 500 to 700 metres (1,600 to 2,300 ft). It is 32.05 nautical miles (59.36 km; 36.88 mi) in length, and extends west from the Gaven Reefs to the northwest of Dangerous Ground. The atoll is up to 11.36 nautical miles (21.04 km; 13.07 mi) wide. The total area is 953 square kilometres (368 sq mi), and the greatest depth of the central lagoon is 80 metres (260 ft). The central lagoon generally is 10 to 40 metres (33 to 131 ft) deep, although many coral heads have much shallower depths. There are several entrances into the lagoon.

The bank contains a number of features along the rim of the reef, including shoals, reefs, islands, and cays, numerous wrecks, some lighthouses, and an ammunition dumping ground in about 2,000 metres (6,600 ft) of water to the north of Itu Aba. Several coral heads with depths of 6–12 metres (20–39 ft) lie in the lagoon, and depths "3.7 metres (12 ft) less than charted can be expected. ... Mariners should navigate with extreme caution in this vicinity."

Features in the area include:

- Namyit Island (10°11'N 114°22'E) on the S side of the bank is about 19 kilometres (12 mi) south of Itu Aba. It is less than a metre (3 ft) high and covered with small trees and brush. Occupied by Vietnam.
- Gaven Reefs (10°12'N 114°13'E) consists of two reefs which cover at high tide and lie 11 kilometres (7 mi) west and 13.7 kilometres (8.5 mi) west-northwest of Namyit Island. Occupied by the PRC.
- Itu Aba Island (10°23'N 114°22'E), lies on the northwest edge of the bank. Occupied by the ROC.
- Zhongzhou Reef (Ban Than Reef / Centre Cay) lies on the north edge between Itu Aba and Sand Cay, 4.8 kilometres (3 mi) east of Itu Aba
- Sand Cay lies on the north edge, 7.2 kilometres (4.5 mi) east of Zhongzhou
- Petley Reef, which dries 0.9 metres (2 ft 11 in), is about 1.6 kilometres (1 mi) in extent and lies on the N side of the bank. Occupied by Vietnam.
- Eldad Reef, 11 kilometres (7 mi) east-southeast of Petley Reef, is the easternmost drying reef of the group. The reef is 7.2 kilometres (4.5 mi) long with the middle section having a depth of about 1.2 metres (3 ft 11 in), located at the northeast end of the reef. Unoccupied.
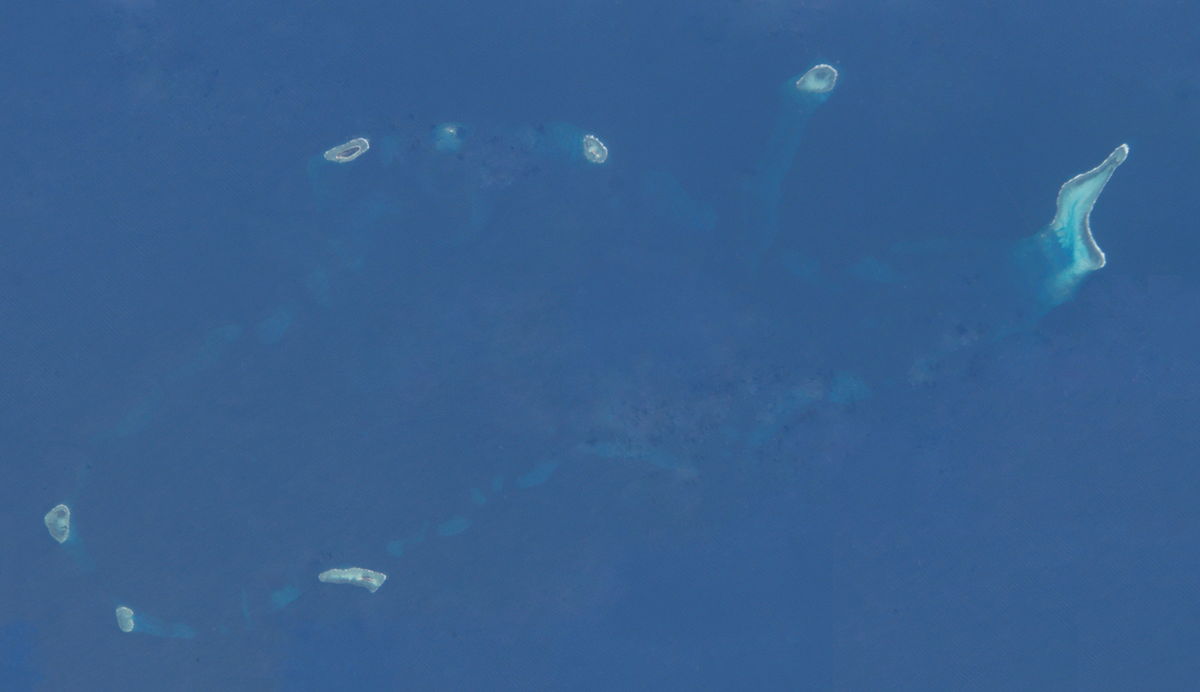
(Eldad Reef)

It is neighboured by the Loaita Bank to the North, Discovery Great Reef to the west, and the Union Banks to the south.

== See also ==
- Spratly Islands
