= East Sea Campaign =

Part of the Vietnam War (1975)

- Part of the Vietnam War
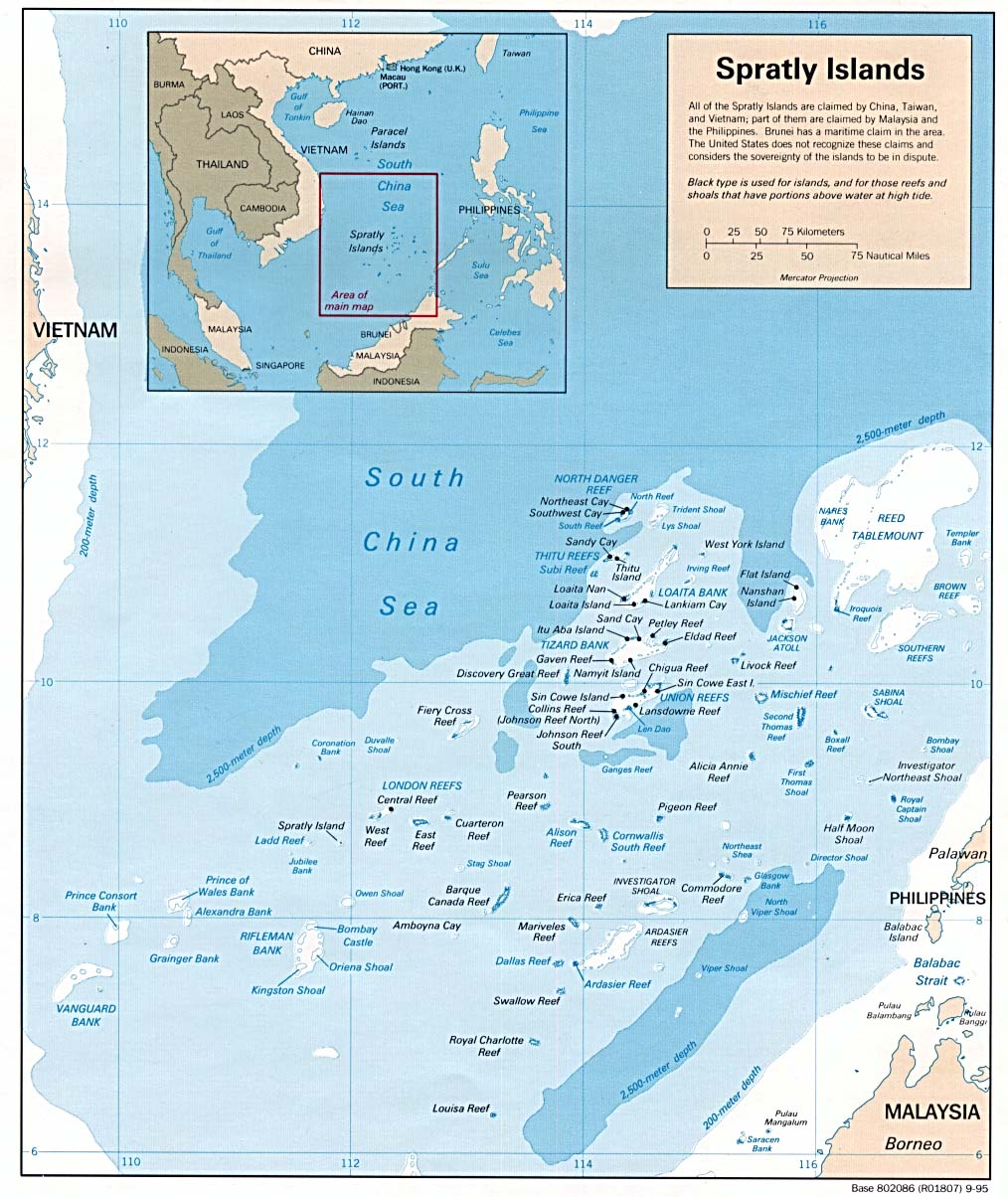
Date	9–29 April 1975; 51 years ago
Location	Southeastern coast of Vietnam and South China Sea.
Result	North Vietnamese victory

Belligerents
North Vietnam; Viet Cong	South Vietnam

Commanders and leaders
Chu Huy Mân; Mai Năng	Chung Tấn Cang

Strength
About 2,000 soldiers and sailors Supported by: 125th Naval Transport Brigade; 5 transport ships	5,768 military personnel Supported by: 1 frigate 2 corvettes 1 transport ship 1 patrol boat

Casualties and losses
2 killed 8 wounded	113 killed 74 wounded 557 captured 1 escort ship damaged

The East Sea and Spratly Islands Campaign (Vietnamese: Chiến dịch Trường Sa và các đảo trên Biển Đông) was a naval operation which took place during the closing days of the Vietnam War in April 1975. The operation took place on Spratly Islands and other islands in the South China Sea (known in Vietnam as the East Sea). Even though it had no significant impact on the final outcome of the war, the capture of certain South Vietnamese-held Spratly Islands (Trường Sa), and other islands on the southeastern coast of Vietnam by the Vietnam People's Navy (VPN) and the Viet Cong (VC) helped the Socialist Republic of Vietnam assert its sovereignty over the various groups of islands after the reunification of the country in 1975. The North Vietnamese objective was to capture all the islands under the occupation of the Army of the Republic of Vietnam (ARVN), and it eventually ended in complete victory for the North Vietnamese.

== Background ==
In 1975, as units of the People's Army of Vietnam (PAVN) were pushing toward Saigon as part of the 1975 Spring Offensive, the North Vietnamese High Command decided to capture all South Vietnamese-occupied islands located on the southeastern coast of Vietnam, and in the South China Sea. Subsequently, different units of the VPN were deployed to coordinate their forces with local VC units in South Vietnam to take the Spratlys and other territories.

During the 1970s the Spratly islands was already a source of dispute for many countries in the region; Malaysia, the People's Republic of China (Communist China), the Republic of China (Taiwan), the Philippines and South Vietnam all claimed sovereignty over all or parts of the islands. In early 1975 the underlying tension between the claimants came to the surface when South Vietnam invaded Southwest Cay, then occupied by the military forces of its wartime ally, the Philippines. In order to lure the Philippines soldiers off Southwest Cay, it was reported that South Vietnamese authorities sent prostitutes to the birthday party of the Philippine military commander on another island.

While the Philippine soldiers left their post to attend the birthday party of their commanding officer, South Vietnamese soldiers moved in to occupy Southwest Cay. After the Philippines military realized they had lost their territory, they planned to retake the island from the South Vietnamese through military force. By the time the Philippines military were able to put their plan into action, the South Vietnamese had already built a strong defense on Southwest Cay, thus deterring any potential counter-attack. Later Southwest Cay would be the first major target for the VPN.

== Prelude ==
=== North Vietnam ===
On 4 April 1975, the High Command of the VPN and the Command of Military Region 5, under the command of General Chu Huy Mân, agreed on a plan to seize some Spratlys and other groups of islands. Under their secret plan, the VPN deployed the 126th Battalion, a naval special forces unit of about 170 personnel, to join the VC 471st Battalion of Military Zone 5. They were supported by three transport ships, the T673, T674 and T675 along with 60 experienced sailors and technicians from the 125th Naval Transport Brigade. The operation would commence at 12.00 am on 9 April 1975, to coincide with the PAVN ground attack on Xuân Lộc and to take advantage of low tide to land the special forces on the South Vietnamese-occupied sections of the Spratly Islands. To maintain the secrecy of their operation, the VPN kept their radio communications to a minimum in the days leading up to the attack.

=== South Vietnam ===
Unlike their North Vietnamese counterparts, South Vietnam possessed a large naval force with a strong fleet of ships. Hence the Republic of Vietnam Navy (RVN), commanded by Vice Admiral Chung Tấn Cang, were able to maintain a strong presence in the Spratly Islands, with only a handful of infantry units provided by the ARVN to protect the smaller islands surrounding the main Spratly Island. To defend the islands, ARVN forces were mainly equipped with small infantry weapons, as well as M-72 anti-tank weapons. Whenever necessary, the RVN could deploy the destroyer Trần Khánh Dư (HQ-04), the frigates Trần Nhật Duật (HQ-03), Lý Thường Kiệt (HQ-16) and RVNS Ngô Quyền (HQ-17), as well as the corvettes Ngọc Hồi (HQ-12) and Vạn Kiếp II (HQ-14) to provide fire support. The RVN also relied on two transport ships, namely the Lam Giang (HQ-402) and Hương Giang (HQ-403), to transport vital supplies and reinforcements to ARVN forces on the Spratly Islands.

== Battle ==
=== Southwest Cay ===
On 9 April 1975, three VPN transport ships, disguised as fishing trawlers, began moving towards Southwest Cay in the Spratly Islands with members of the 126th and 471st Battalions all on board. On the morning of 11 April 1975, helicopters from the United States Seventh Fleet began circling the VPN transport ships, but they were allowed to move on as the disguised North Vietnamese 'fishing trawlers' were mistakenly identified as ships from Hong Kong. After the American helicopters flew away, the North Vietnamese continued sailing towards Southwest Cay. On the night of 13 April, the three ships were closing in on Southwest Cay from three different directions. During the early hours of 13 April 1975, personnel from the VPN 126th Battalion and the VC 471st Battalion landed on Southwest Cay using rubber boats.

Taken by complete surprise, the ARVN on Southwest Cay put up stiff resistance, but they surrendered to the VPN/VC after 30 minutes of fighting. The VPN/VC claimed to have killed 6 ARVN in action, and taken 33 prisoners. In response to the attack on Southwest Cay, the RVN immediately formed a task force which came in the form of the frigate RVNS Lý Thường Kiệt and the HQ-402 transport ship to retaliate, but both ships were forced to turn back and defend Namyit Island instead. Having achieved their initial objective, the VPN command sent out the transport ship T641, to carry all the captured ARVN soldiers back to Da Nang. With Southwest Cay firmly in their hands, the VPN command set their sights on the next three targets: Namyit, Sin Cowe and Sand Cay.

=== Sand Cay ===
The VPN, however, were deterred from attacking Namyit Island because they had lost the element of surprise, as well as the strong presence of several RVN frigates surrounding that island. So, instead of attacking Namyit, the VPN selected Sand Cay as their next target. On the night of 24 April, under the observation of the Taiwanese military, VPN transport ships sailed in a single column passed the Taiwanese-occupied island of Itu Aba towards their next objective. Again, following the same pattern of operation, the ships anchored near Sand Cay and prepared for their assault. At 1.30 am on 25 April, three platoons from the 126th Battalion successfully landed on Sand Cay. One hour later, they opened their attack and the ARVN were easily defeated, suffering 2 deaths and 23 captured.

The loss of Southwest Cay and Sand Cay, in combination with the defeats suffered by the ARVN on the mainland, placed the RVN in a complex and difficult position. As a result, at 8.45 pm on 26 April, RVN ships in the Spratly Island area were ordered to evacuate the ARVN 371st Local Battalion and withdraw from Namyit and Sin Cowe. While the RVN were preparing to withdraw from Spratly Island, VPN reconnaissance units sent reports back to Hanoi, informing the naval command of RVN ships leaving their positions in Namyit and Sin Cowe. Upon hearing the news of the South Vietnamese withdrawal, the VPN command ordered the 126th Battalion to capture the remaining islands. On 27 and 28 April, the PAVN 126th Battalion marched onto Namyit and Sin Cowe without opposition. On 29 April, the VPN had successfully completed their mission in capturing all of the islands of the Spratly group that had been held by South Vietnam.

=== Phú Quý Island ===
Phú Quý island, also known as Cu Lao Thu, is located off the coast of southern Vietnam. The island is about 60 nautical miles (110 km) away from Phan Thiết, and 82 nautical miles (152 km) away from Cam Ranh Bay. The island is about 21 square kilometers in size, and in 1975 it had a population of about 12,000 people. At the end of March 1975, the ARVN maintained a security team on Phú Quý, which included one police platoon and 4,000 members of the People's Self-Defense Forces. From April 1975, the local ARVN forces on Phú Quý were joined by an additional 800 ARVN soldiers, who escaped from the mainland town of Hàm Tân when PAVN forces captured it. On April 22, the RVN deployed the HQ-11 corvette and one small patrol boat to defend the island from VPN attack. On April 26, 1975, the PAVN South Central Coast Command at Cam Ranh Base and the 125th Naval Transport Brigade of the VPN began transporting members of the 407th Special Forces Battalion from Military Region 5, and elements of the 95th Regiment towards Phú Quý.

At 1.50 am on 27 April, the VPN/PAVN landed on the island and the fight for Phú Quý Island began. Caught by surprise, South Vietnamese units retreated to the administrative center of the island, where they organized their defenses in an attempt to push back the North Vietnamese forces. While at sea, the RVN's HQ-11 escort ship clashed with boats from the VPN 125th Navy Transport Brigade, but ultimately the long-range artillery used by the VPN proved too much for the HQ-11 and it retreated from the island with significant damage. After several hours of waiting, the commander of the HQ-11 decided to pull anchor and escaped to the Philippines when further reinforcements from the RVN failed to arrive. At 6.30 am remnants of the ARVN gave up and ended their resistance. The North Vietnamese claimed to have captured 382 ARVN prisoners, and collected more than 900 weapons of various kinds.

=== Côn Đảo Archipelago ===
Côn Đảo archipelago is located in the southwestern area of the South China Sea, nearly 180 kilometers (110 mi) from the city of Vũng Tàu. Côn Sơn Island is the largest island with an area of 52 square kilometers, accounting for about 75% of the entire Côn Đảo archipelago. Côn Sơn is the largest township on the island and was also the seat of the local government. By the end of the war, about 7,000 political and military prisoners, of whom 500 were female, were imprisoned at Côn Đảo Prison. On 29 April, the airfield at Côn Sơn became a staging post where South Vietnamese government officials and U.S. advisers were assembled, to be evacuated to the U.S. warships of the 7th Fleet which anchored nearby. During the last days of the war, about 2,000 ARVN soldiers were defending the island.

During the early hours of 1 May, all the political prisoners at Prison VII staged an uprising and they quickly overpowered what was left of the South Vietnamese prison authorities. They set up a Provisional Committee to govern the island, and organised three platoon-sized units using captured weapons to march on the remnants of the ARVN. The political prisoners attacked the ARVN barracks at Bình Định Vuong, Camp IV and Camp V. The ARVN chose to run away instead of fighting back, whilst leaving large quantities of weapons and ammunition behind. Encouraged by the news of South Vietnam's capitulation, the prisoners continued their march towards the local police station which had already been abandoned by the South Vietnamese. By 8 am the prisoners had captured all former South Vietnamese infrastructure and assets, including 27 aircraft, as the remaining ARVN soldiers at the Côn Sơn airport also surrendered.

On the evening of 2 May, the rebel prisoners on Côn Đảo Island successfully established communications with North Vietnamese military units. To prepare for the arrival of the North Vietnamese, the Provisional Committee moved to set up a trench system around the island to defend against a possible South Vietnamese or U.S. counter-attack. On the morning of 5 May, the VPN 171st and 172nd Naval Regiments landed on Côn Đảo Island with elements of the PAVN 3rd Division. Throughout the day regular North Vietnamese military units and the rebel prisoners coordinated to establish control over the rest of the Côn Đảo Archipelago.

== Aftermath ==
After more than two months of planning and combat operations, the VPN successfully captured the Spratly, Phú Quý and Côn Đảo groups of islands from the South Vietnamese. In the days following their victory the North Vietnamese also went on to raise their flag over the smaller cays and reefs of An Bang (Amboyna Cay), Sin Cowe East and Pearson Reef (Hon Sap). In 1976, following the unification of Vietnam, some Spratly islands became a part of Khánh Hòa Province.

To assert Vietnam's political sovereignty, the North Vietnamese military initially deployed four battalions of the 2nd Division from Military Region 5 to defend the islands. In September 1975 the North Vietnamese Ministry of Defense transferred the 46th Infantry Regiment from the PAVN 325th Division to the VPN, to form a brigade with the 126th Naval Regiment with the purpose of defending the Spratlys and other groups of islands. Following the establishment of the Socialist Republic of Vietnam in 1976, additional units were transferred to 126th Naval Infantry Brigade to bolster the defenses of Vietnam's outlying islands.
