= Namyit Island =

Island in the South China Sea

Disputed island
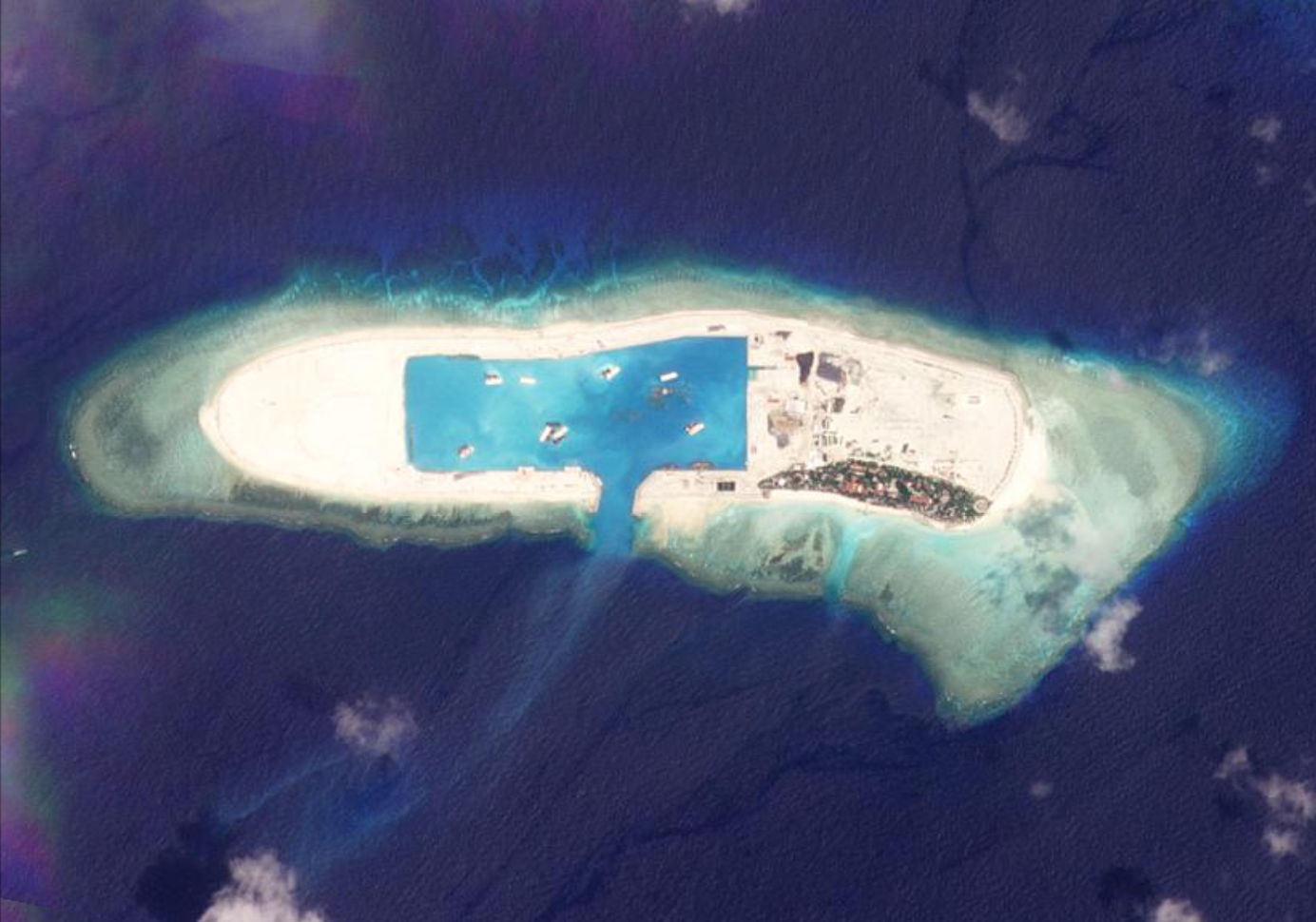
- Namyit Island in 2024

- Location within Spratly Islands
- Other names: Đảo Nam Yết (Vietnamese); Binago Island (Philippine English); Pulo ng Binago (Filipino) 鴻庥島 / 鸿庥岛 Hóngxiū Dǎo (Chinese)

Geography
- Location: South China Sea
- Coordinates: 10°10′46″N 114°22′00″E
- Archipelago: Spratly Islands

Administration
- Vietnam
- District: Trường Sa District
- Commune: Sinh Tồn Commune

Claimed by
- China
- Philippines
- Taiwan
- Vietnam

Namyit Island, also known as Vietnamese: Đảo Nam Yết; Binago Island (Filipino: Pulo ng Binago, lit. 'Island of Changed'); Mandarin Chinese: 鴻庥島/鸿庥岛; pinyin: Hóngxiū Dǎo, is the third-largest island on Tizard Bank in the northwest of the Spratly Islands in South China Sea. With an area of 5.3 hectares (13 acres), it is the twelfth-largest naturally occurring Spratly island, and the fifth-largest among the Vietnamese-administered islands. The island is also claimed by China (PRC), the Philippines, and Taiwan (ROC).

== History in the 20th century ==
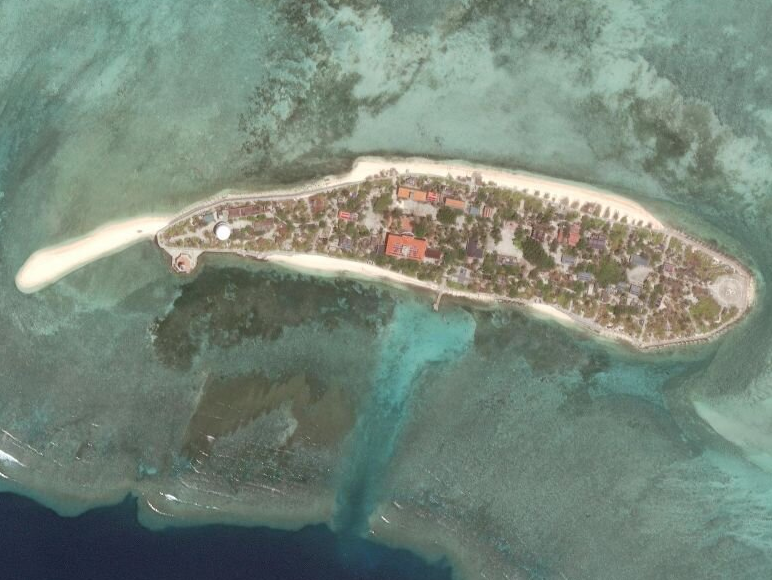
Namyit Island in 2020

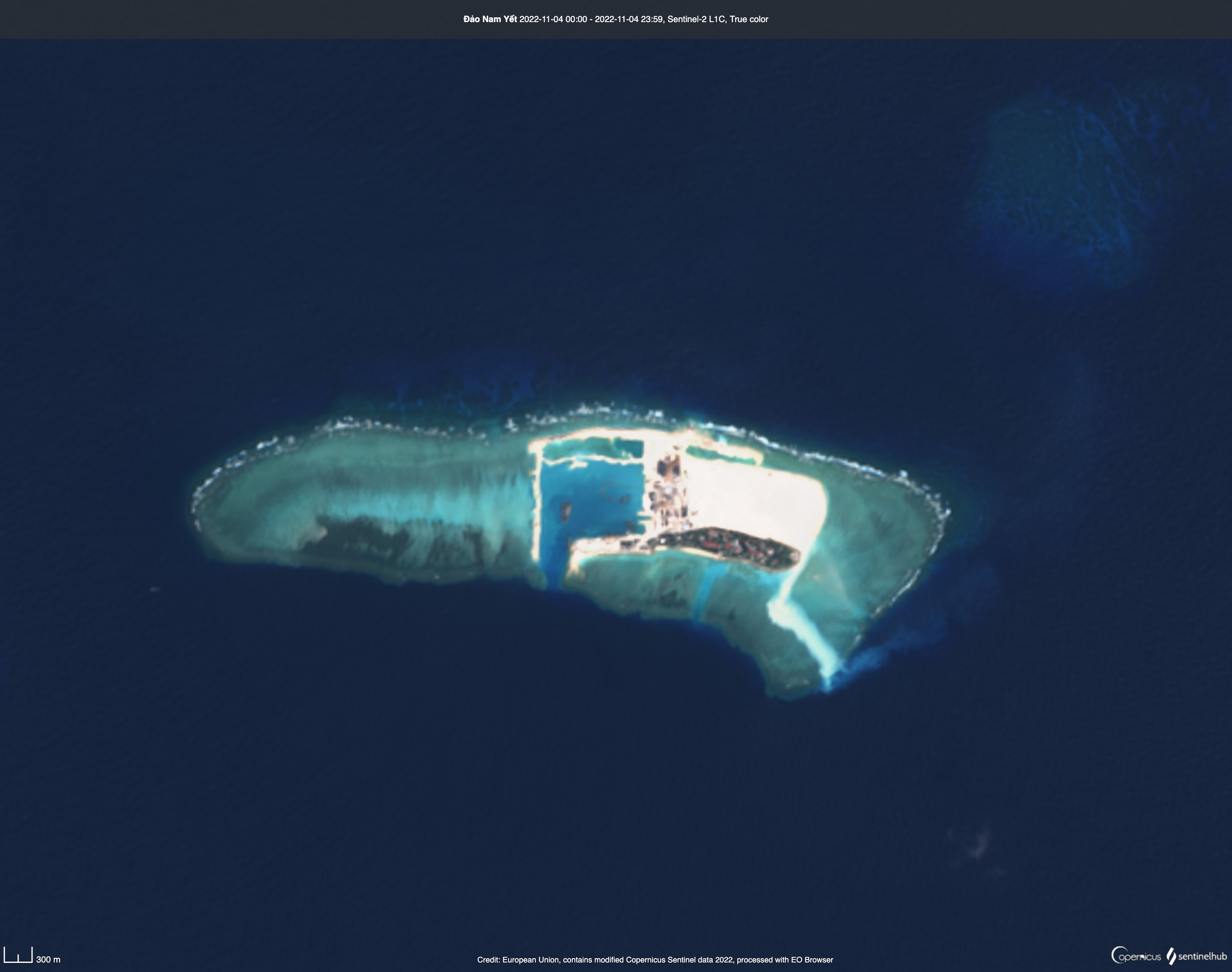
Namyit Island in 2022

Although two South Vietnamese warships (the HQ-04 Tuy Dong and HQ-05 Tay Ket) stopped at Namyit Island in 1962, South Vietnamese troops did not set up a permanent garrison on the islet until August 1973. On 6 September 1973, the Republic of Vietnam's Ministry of the Interior signed Decree No. 420-BNV/HCĐP/26 merging some Spratly islands, including Namyit, into Phuoc Hai Commune, Dat Do District, Phuoc Tuy Province. South Vietnam continued to administer the entity until 27 April 1975 when their troops were evicted by the Vietnam People's Army.

== Geography ==
11 nautical miles (20 kilometres) to the south of Itu Aba Island, Namyit Island is a small oval-shaped coral island which is 600 metres (660 yards) long and 125 metres (137 yards) wide. The coral reef on which the island lies is 0.2 metres (7.9 inches) to 0.4 metres (1 foot 4 inches) above the sea during low tide. There is a heliport at the end of island.

In 2022, news reports indicated that the Vietnamese government was engaged in dredging and landfill operations to expand the size of Namyit Island, Sand Cay, and Pearson Reef. The total area of the land reclaimed in this operations was estimated to be 170 hectares (420 acres).

Namyit Island Light is a white round tower with red bands standing 23 metres (75 feet) in height.

== Ecology ==
Namyit Island has no source of fresh water, and its coral sand is not suitable for plants in general. The island is covered with small trees, bushes and grass and is inhabited by sea birds. The surrounding water is home to 492 species of plankton, 86 species of seaweed, two species of seagrass, 225 species of benthic organisms, 160 species of coral, 414 species of reef fish and two species of sea turtles.

== See also ==
- Trường Sa District
- Spratly Islands dispute
