= Zhongzhou Reef =

Disputed reef in the South China Sea

Disputed island
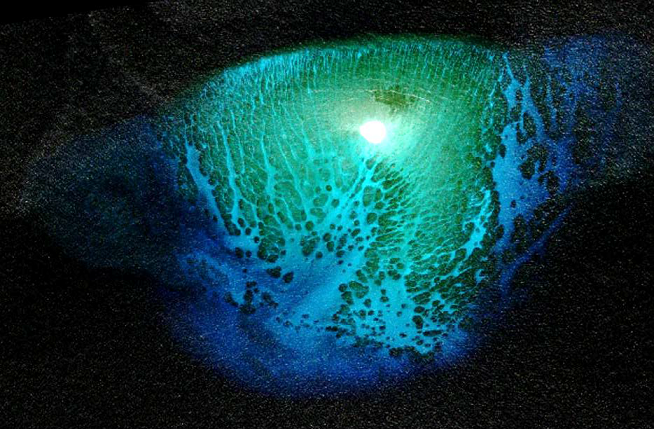
- Zhongzhou Reef

- Location within Spratly Islands
- Other names: Zhōngzhōu jiāo (中洲礁) (Chinese); Bahura ng Silangang Ligaw (Filipino/Tagalog); Bãi Bàn Than (Vietnamese)

Geography
- Location: South China Sea
- Coordinates: 10°23′10″N 114°24′49″E
- Archipelago: Spratly Islands
- Length: 100 m (300 ft)
- Width: 100 m (300 ft)

Administration
- Republic of China (Taiwan)
- Municipality District: Kaohsiung; Cijin

Claimed by
- China
- City: Sansha, Hainan
- Philippines
- Municipality: Kalayaan, Palawan
- Republic of China (Taiwan)
- Municipality District: Kaohsiung; Cijin
- Vietnam
- District: Trường Sa, Khánh Hòa

Zhongzhou Reef (also known as Ban Than Reef among other variants) (Chinese: 中洲礁; Chinese: 中洲礁; pinyin: Zhōngzhōu Jiāo; Filipino: Bahura ng Silangang Ligaw; Vietnamese: Bãi Bàn Than) is a small coral reef on the north edge of the Tizard Bank in the Spratly Islands, South China Sea under administration by the Republic of China (Taiwan). It lies 4.6 km (2.9 mi) east of Taiwan-administered Taiping Island (Itu Aba), 7.2 km (4.5 mi) west of Vietnam-administered Sand Cay, and has an exposed area of approximately 0.2 hectares (0.49 acres) during high tide, and 0.6 hectares (1.5 acres) during low tide. It consists of an accumulation of seashells, sand, coral reefs and debris which forms a circular coral reef plate, surrounding the reef under the water, with a diameter of approximately 1.3 km (0.8 mi).

The reef is also claimed by the People's Republic of China, the Philippines, and Vietnam.

As many as 51 species of migratory birds inhabit the reef for short stays. The surrounding waters contain a rich marine ecosystem with plentiful staghorn coral. Shellfish species such as Harpago chiragra and Cassis cornuta can be found on the reef, and the surrounding waters contain various common tropical fish and coral reef fish. The reef geology is not suitable for plant growth.

The reef has no groundwater source. Though currently uninhabited by humans, the Taiwanese Coast Guard sends regular patrols via M8 speedboats from nearby Taiping Island. These patrols circle the reef, in addition to landing, making inspections and carrying out ecological surveys.

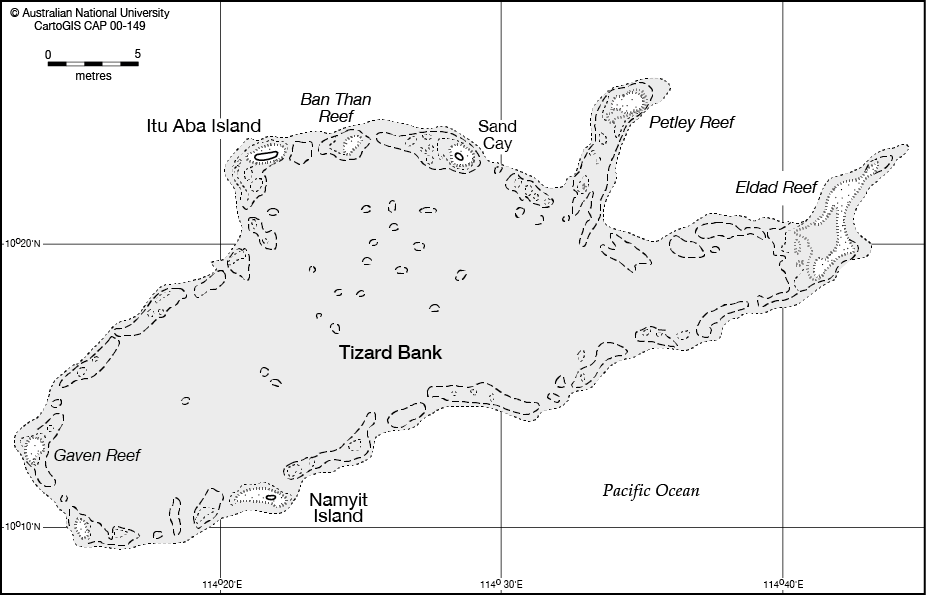

== Recent history ==
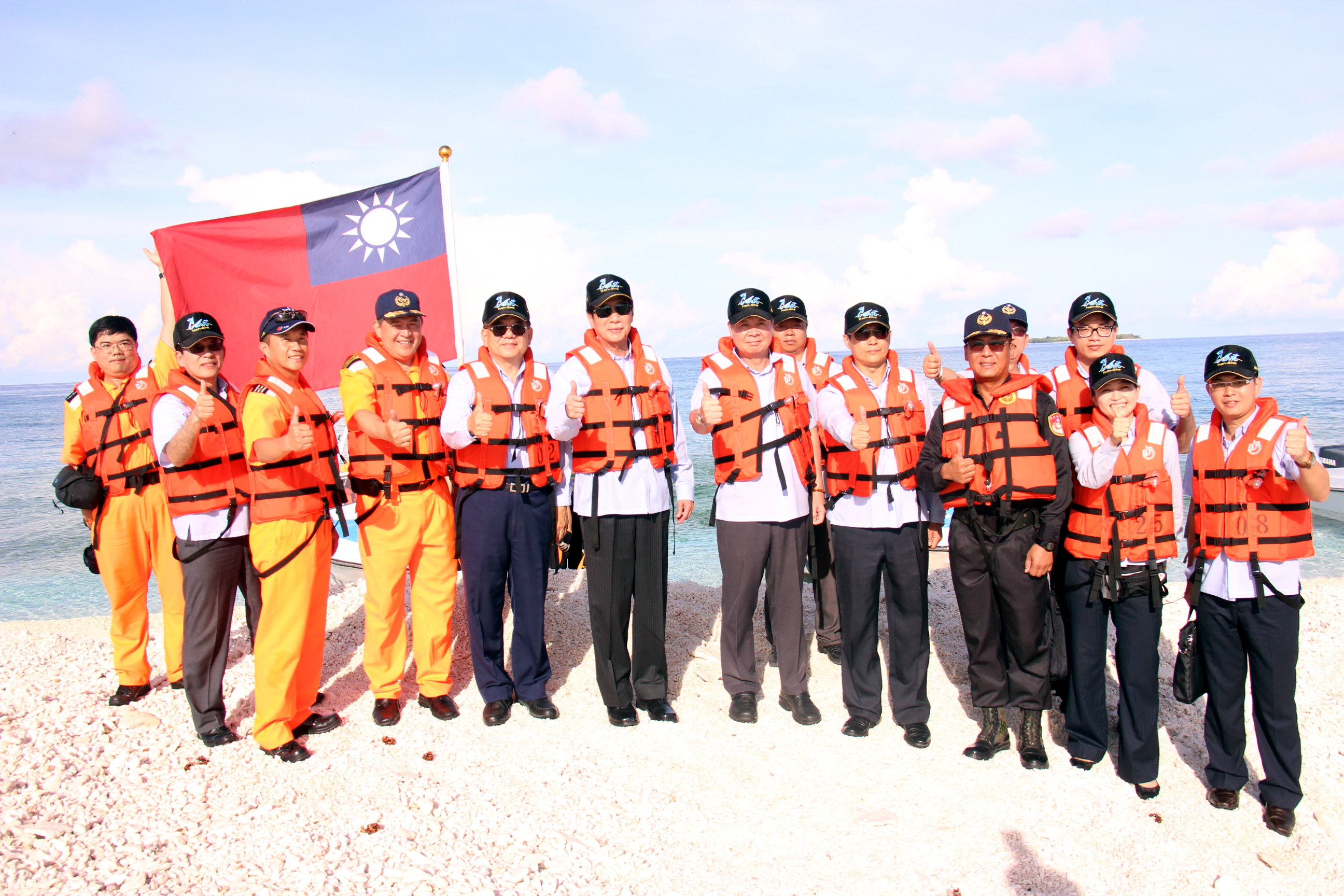
Taiwanese Coast Guard Landing on Zhongzhou Reef on June 15, 2015, as part of their visit to Taiping Island

The reef was included within the area claimed by China in 1935, and this claim was reiterated in a map published in 1947.

Scientists from Taiwan conducted ecological research on green turtles living on the reef from 2002 to 2003.

On 16 August 2003, the Taiwanese Minister of the Interior Yu Cheng-hsien visited the reef, travelling via M8 speedboat, and planted a Taiwanese flag in a declaration of sovereignty. On 28 March 2004, the Taiwanese Coast Guard Administration completed the construction of wooden observation kiosks on the reef. In September 2010, the ROC Environmental Protection Agency conducted environmental quality sampling intending on monitoring reef marine water quality.

On 22 March 2012, a routine patrol of the Taiwanese Coast Guard came into contact with Vietnamese patrol boats near the reef; following the incident, Taiwanese legislators Lin Yu-fang, Chen Zhenxiang and Chen Zhankai visited the reef by M8 speedboats.

In April 2026, the minister of Taiwan's Ocean Affairs Council, Kuan Bi-ling, visited Taiping Island and Zhongzhou Reef to observe a Taiwanese coast guard exercise. The visit to Zhongzhou Reef involved a beach cleanup.

== See also ==
- Pratas Island
- Taiping Island
- List of islands of Taiwan
- List of maritime features in the Spratly Islands
