= Petley Reef =

Reef in the Spratly Islands

Disputed reef
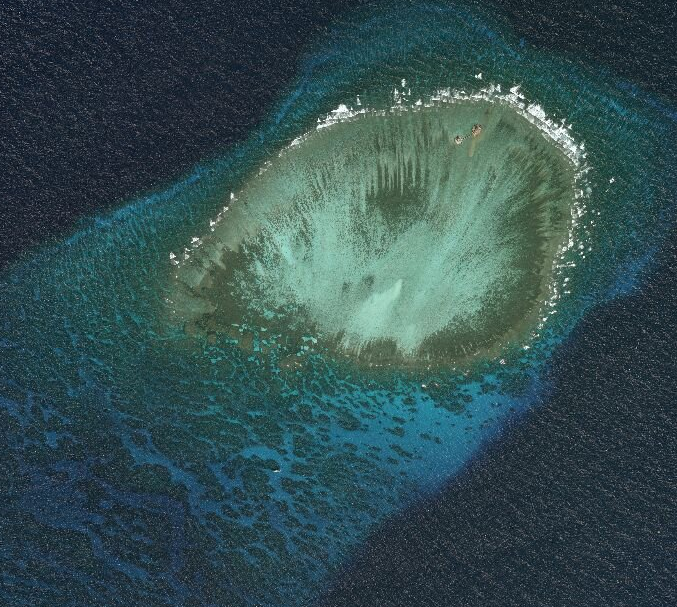
- Petley Reef

- Location within Spratly Islands
- Other names: Sinh Tồn Đông (Vietnamese); Juan Luna Reef (Philippine English); Bahura ng Juan Luna (Filipino) 舶兰礁 Bólán jiāo (Chinese)

Geography
- Location: South China Sea
- Coordinates: 10°24′37″N 114°35′14″E
- Archipelago: Spratly Islands

Administration
- Vietnam
- District: Trường Sa District
- Commune: Sinh Tồn Commune

Claimed by
- China
- Philippines
- Taiwan
- Vietnam

Petley Reef (Filipino: Bahura ng Juan Luna); Núi Thị Reef (Vietnamese: Đá Núi Thị); Mandarin Chinese: 舶兰礁; pinyin: Bólán jiāo, is a reef on the northern part of the Tizard Bank of the Spratly Islands in the South China Sea. The reef has been occupied by Vietnam since 1988. It is also claimed by China (PRC), the Philippines, and Taiwan.

== See also ==
- Spratly Islands dispute
