= Sand Cay =

Island in the South China Sea

Disputed island
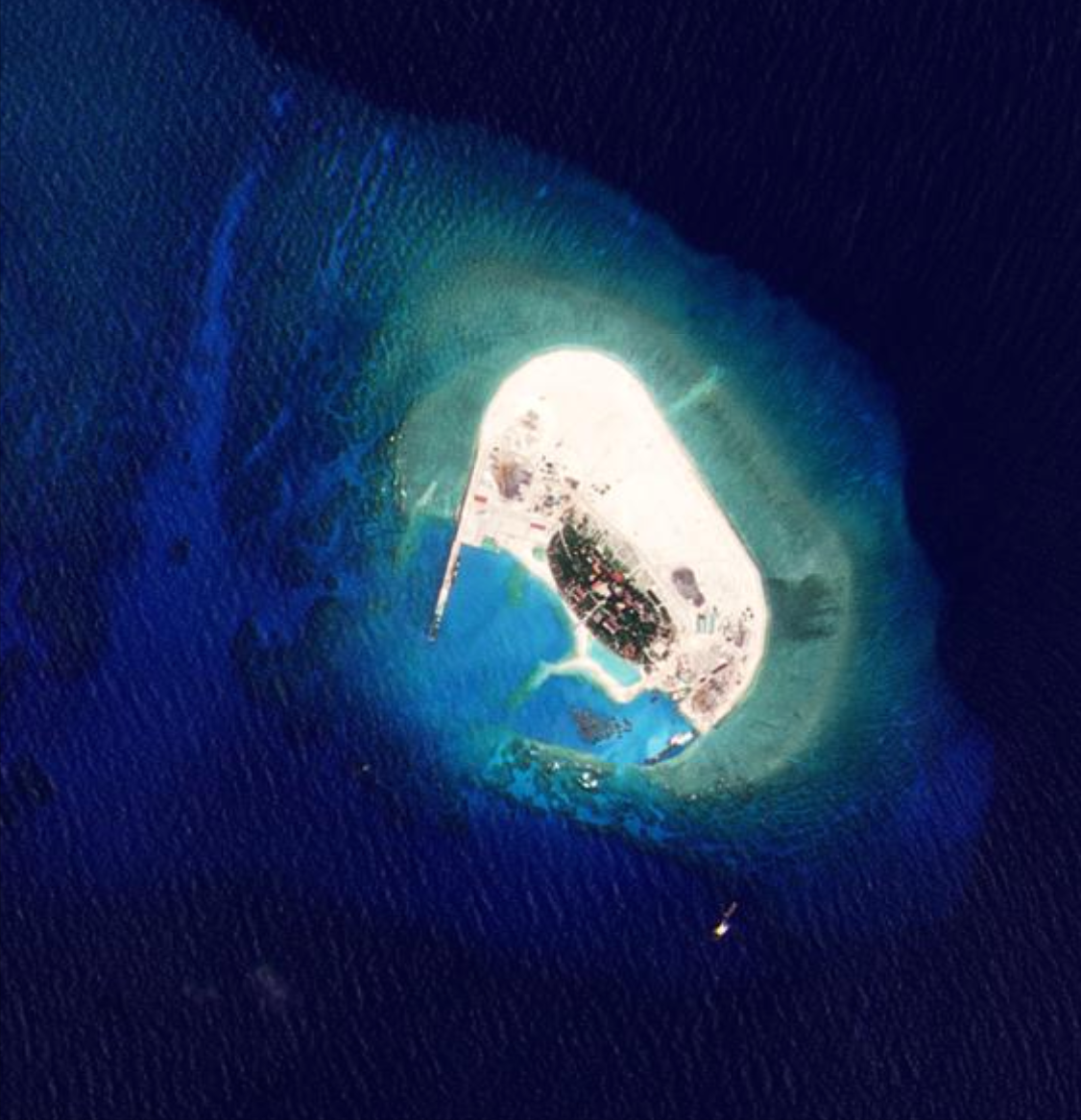

- Location within Spratly Islands
- Other names: Đảo Sơn Ca (Vietnamese); Bailan Island (Philippine English); Pulo ng Bailan (Filipino) 敦謙沙洲 / 敦谦沙洲 Dūnqiān Shāzhōu (Chinese)

Geography
- Location: South China Sea
- Coordinates: 10.375°N 114.480°E
- Archipelago: Spratly Islands
- Area: 40 ha (99 acres)

Administration
- Vietnam
- District: Trường Sa District
- Commune: Sinh Tồn Commune

Claimed by
- China
- Philippines
- Taiwan
- Vietnam

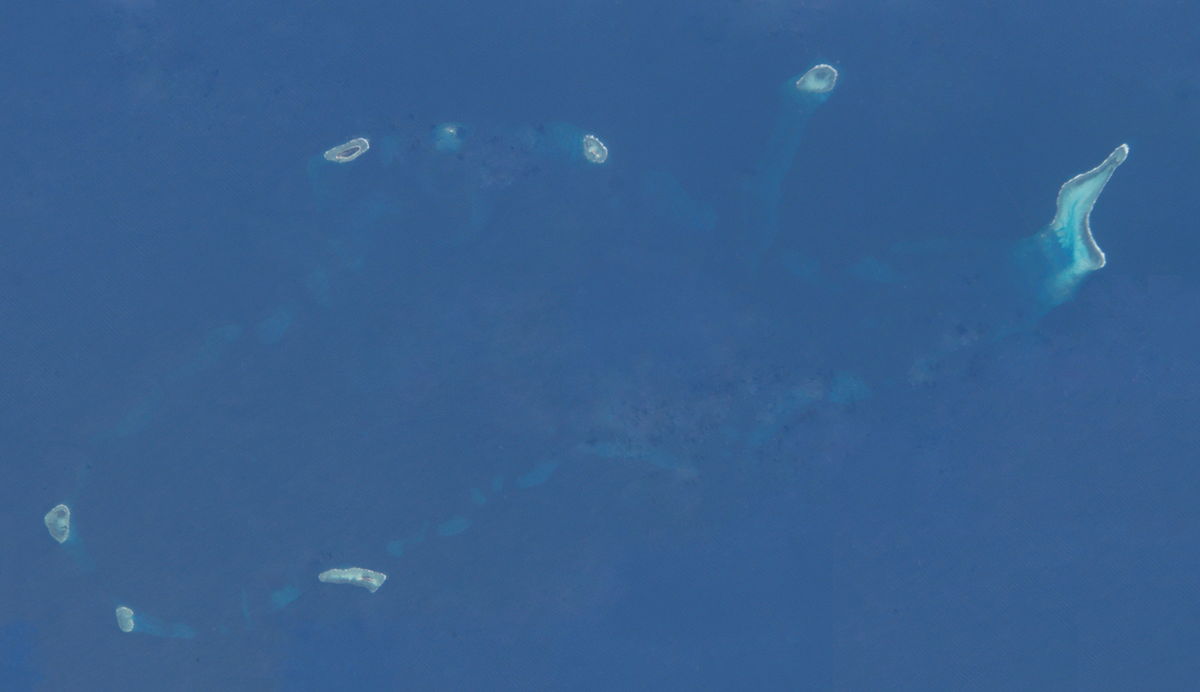
From right to left: Sand Cay, Zhongzhou/Ban Than Reef and Taiping Island

Sand Cay, also known as Bailan Island (Filipino: Pulo ng Bailan) and Son Ca Island (Vietnamese: Đảo Sơn Ca; Mandarin Chinese: 敦謙沙洲/敦谦沙洲; pinyin: Dūnqiān Shāzhōu), is a cay on the north edge of the Tizard Bank of the Spratly Islands in the South China Sea. With an natural area of 7 hectares (17 acres), it is the ninth largest, and the fourth largest Vietnamese-administered, of the Spratly Islands. The island has been occupied by Vietnam since 1974 (first by South Vietnam, then by the Socialist Republic of Vietnam after 1975). It is also claimed by China (PRC), the Philippines, Vietnam, and Taiwan (ROC).

== Sovereignty ==
The island has been occupied by Vietnam since 1974 (first by South Vietnam, then by the Socialist Republic of Vietnam after 1975). By the later half of the 20th century, no nation had complete sovereignty on the islands.

== Geography ==
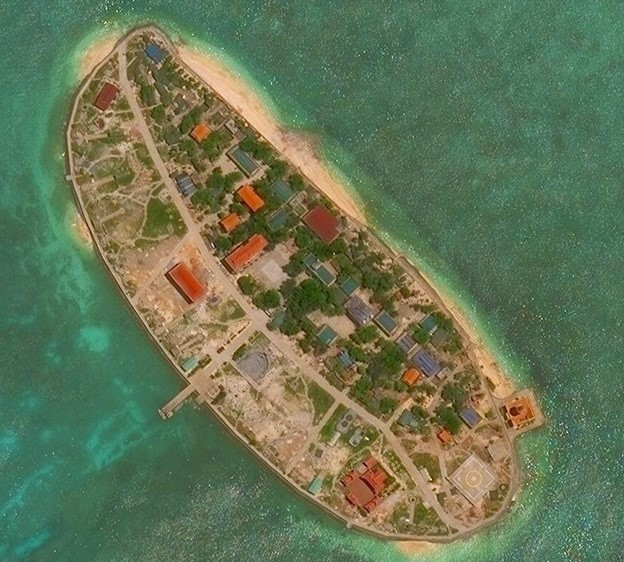
Sand Cay in 2020

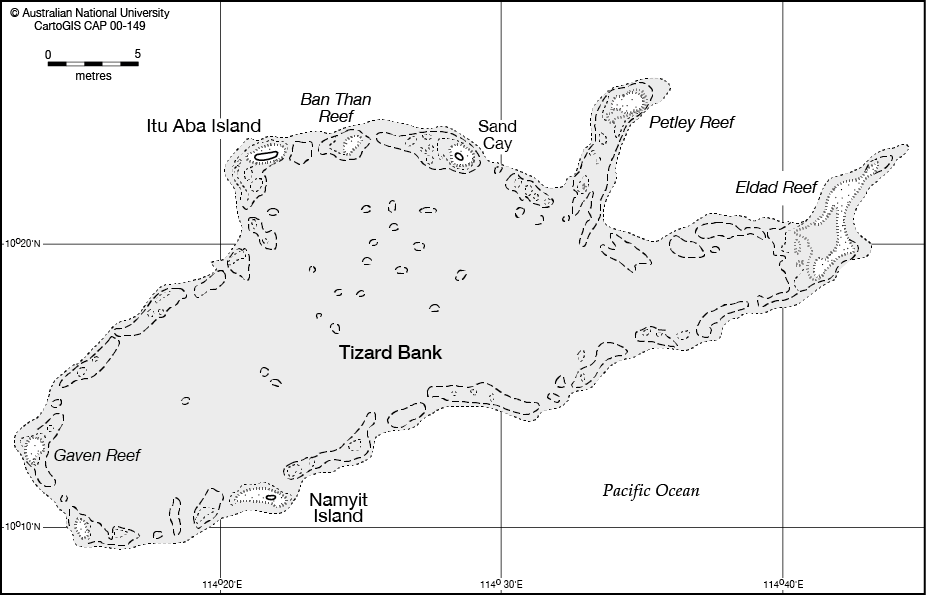

Part of the Tizard Bank, Sand Cay lies 6.2 nautical miles (11.5 km; 7.1 mi) east of Itu Aba Island, which is occupied by Taiwan. It is 450 metres (1,480 ft) long, 102 metres (335 ft) wide, and has an elevation of 3.5 metres (11 ft) to 3.8 metres (12 ft) at low tide. There is a 41 metres (135 ft) high light house on the islet. Sand Cay is commonly confused with Sandy Cay which is a sandy shoal (coral reef) near Thitu Island.

In 2022, news reports indicated that the Vietnamese government was engaged in dredging and landfill operations to expand the size of Sand Cay, Namyit Island, and Pearson Reef. The total area of the land reclaimed in these operations was estimated to be 170 hectares (420 acres).

== Ecology ==
Sand Cay has no natural fresh water. The islet's coral sand is covered with a thin layer of fertile humus mixed with guano. The vegetation is mainly Barringtonia asiatica, Ipomoea pes-caprae, Casuarinaceae species and some grasses. In recent years, islanders have cultivated fruit trees such as pomelo, jackfruit, dragon fruit, sugar-apple and guava. Sand Cay is usually visited by seabirds, and its surrounding water is rich with fish, sea snails and sea cucumbers.

== See also ==
- Great Wall of Sand
- List of maritime features in the Spratly Islands
- Spratly Islands dispute
- Truong Sa District
