= List of airports in the Spratly Islands =

This is a list of airports in the Spratly Islands in the South China Sea.

== Airports ==
Location	Occupied by	Name	Code	Built	Length	Notes
Taiping Island	Republic of China	Taiping Island Airport	RCSP	2007	1,200 m (est.)	Military use only. No refueling facilities.
Swallow Reef (Layang-Layang)	Malaysia	Layang-Layang Airport	LAC	1995	1,367 m	Dual-use concrete airport.
Fiery Cross Reef	China	Yongshu Airport	AG 4553	2016	3,300 m (est.)	Dual-use concrete airport.
Subi Reef	China	Zhubi Airport		2016	3,000 m (est.)	Dual-use concrete airport.
Mischief Reef	China	Meiji Airport		2016	2,700 m (est.)	Dual-use concrete airport.
Thitu Island (Pag-asa)	Philippines	Rancudo Airfield	RPPN	1978	1,300 m (est.)	Dual-use concrete airport.
Spratly Island (Trường Sa Lớn)	Vietnam	Trường Sa Airport		1976–77	1,200 - 1,300 m (est.)	Military use only. Extended from 600 m to 1,200 m in 2016.
Barque Canada Reef (Bãi Thuyền Chài)	Vietnam	Bãi Thuyền Chài Airport		2025	3,200 m (est.)	Likely military use only.

== Location ==
Location of Airports
