= Layang-Layang Airport =

Layang-Layang Airport Swallow Reef Airport
- IATA: LAC; ICAO: none

Summary
- Airport type: Dual-use
- Operator: Ministry of Defence
- Location: Swallow Reef
- Elevation AMSL: 3 m (9.8 ft)
- Coordinates: 7°22′20″N 113°50′30″E

Map
- Location of airport in the South China Sea

Runways
Direction	Length		Surface
Direction	m	ft	Surface
06/24	1,367	4,485	Concrete

Layang-Layang Airport (English: Swallow Reef Airport) is located on Swallow Reef (Pulau Layang-Layang) in the Spratly Islands of the South China Sea. It is about 300 kilometres (190 mi) north of Kota Kinabalu, Sabah. The airport serves a Royal Malaysian Navy naval station (Station Lima) and a 3-star diving resort as well as a marine research facility, MARSAL (Marine Research Station Pulau Layang-Layang).

== Background ==
The runway's original length was 1,064 metres (3,491 ft), but it is now 1,367 metres (4,485 ft) after an extension was completed in 2003. The airport was built in the period 1991 to 1995 by the Malaysian Government as part of a plan to exploit the tourism potential of the island. The island is administrated by Malaysia, but as with all of the Spratly Islands, it is disputed territory.

== Airlines and destinations ==
Airlines	Destinations
AirBorneo	Charter: Kota Kinabalu
Layang Layang Aerospace	Charter: Kota Kinabalu

== Facilities ==
The airport consists of a paved runway, two hangars, a radar station, a control tower and watchtowers. The concrete runway is 1,367 metres (4,485 ft) long, 28 metres (92 ft) wide, and has a Pavement Classification Number of 032RBXU, indicating a medium strength rigid pavement, with a high maximum tire pressure.

The airport is dual-use, serving both military and civilian aircraft. Layang Layang Aerospace operates Nomad N22C aircraft to and from Kota Kinabalu International Airport. The Royal Malaysian Air Force operates C130 Hercules transport planes and CN-235 maritime patrol aircraft to and from Labuan Airport.

Currently AirBorneo operates seasonal charter flights to the airport during the dry season using an ATR72-500.

== See also ==
- Dongsha Island Airport (Pratas Island)
- Yongxing Island Airport (Woody Island in the Paracel Islands)
- List of airports in the Spratly Islands
- List of maritime features in the Spratly Islands
- Taiping Island Airport
