= Dongsha Airport =

Airport in Cijin District, Taiwan

Dongsha Airport 東沙空軍基地 東沙機場
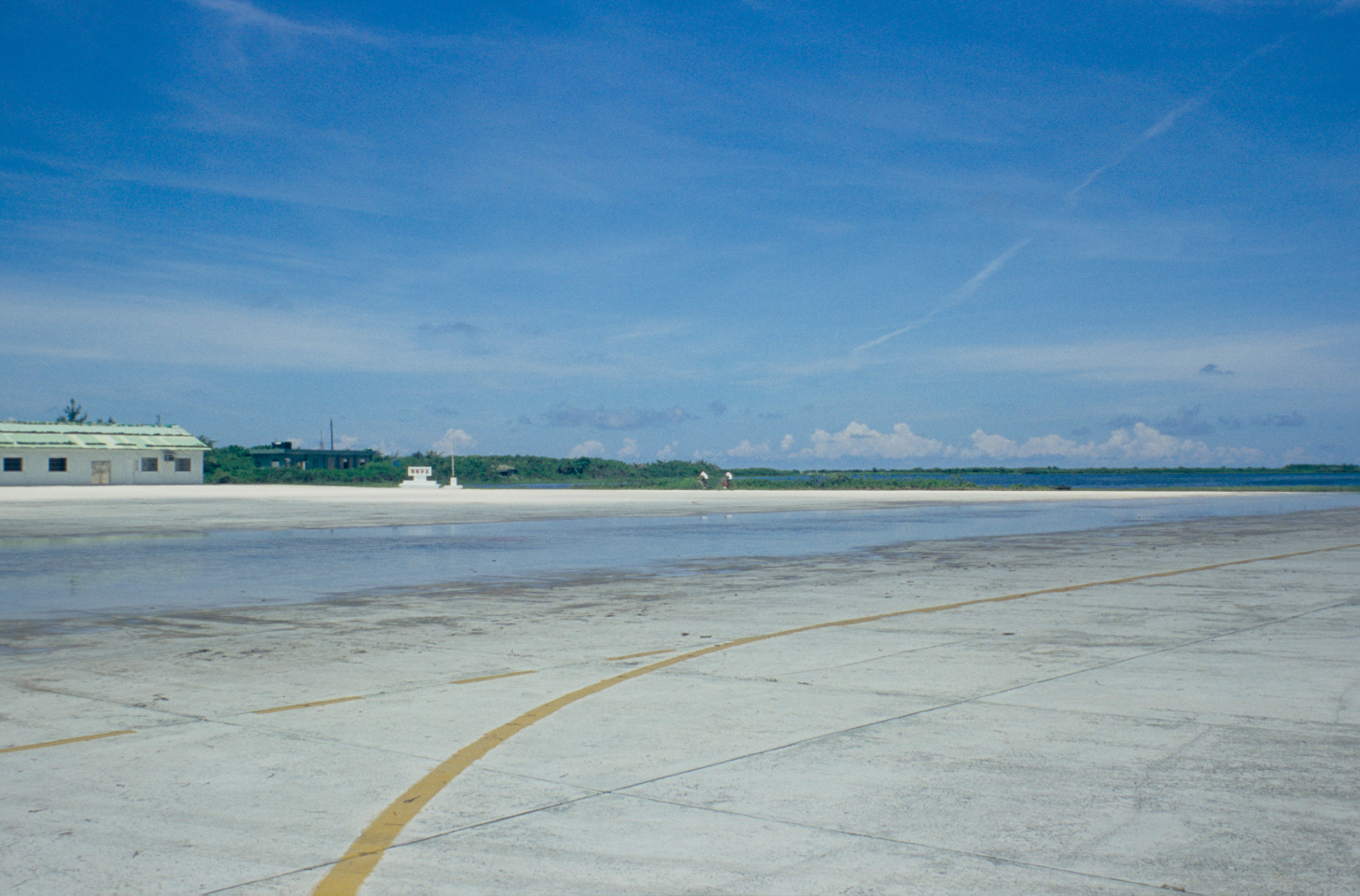
- IATA: DSX; ICAO: RCLM

Summary
- Airport type: Public
- Operator: Coast Guard Administration (Taiwan)
- Serves: Pratas Island (Tungsha/Dongsha), Cijin District, Kaohsiung, Republic of China (Taiwan)
- Location: Pratas Island (Tungsha/Dongsha)
- Coordinates: 20°42′N 116°43′E

Map
- Location of airport in the South China Sea

Runways
Direction	Length		Surface
Direction	m	ft	Surface
11/29	1,550	5,085	Concrete

Dongsha Airport (IATA: DSX, ICAO: RCLM) is located on Pratas Island (Tungsha/Dongsha) in Cijin District of Kaohsiung, Taiwan. Uni Air offers flights from Kaohsiung once per week each Thursday, but the service is only available for Coast Guard Administration staff.

Since there are no refueling facilities within the airport, there is a limit of 56 passengers and 500 kilograms of cargo load per flight.

== Airlines and destinations ==
Airlines	Destinations
Republic of China Air Force	Military Charter: Kaohsiung
Uni Air	Military Charter: Kaohsiung

== See also ==
- Yongxing Island Airport (Woody Island in the Paracel Islands)
- Taiping Island Airport
- List of airports in the Spratly Islands
