= Taiping Island Airport =

Airport in Qijin, Kaohsiung, Taiwan

Taiping Island Airport 太平島機場 Tàipíng Dǎo Jīchǎng
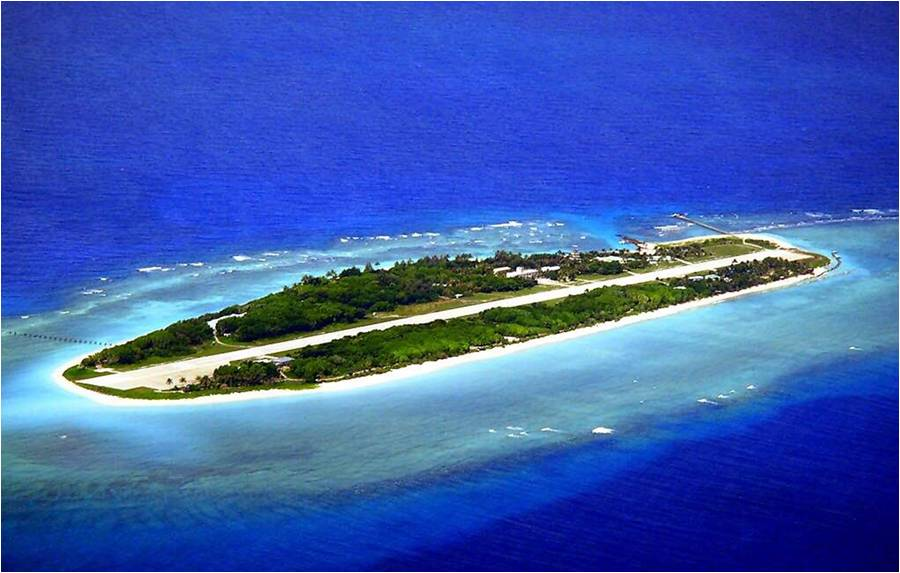
- IATA: none; ICAO: RCSP

Summary
- Airport type: Military
- Operator: ROC Air Force
- Location: Taiping Island
- Coordinates: 10°22′38″N 114°21′59″E

Map
- Location of airport in the South China Sea

Runways
Direction	Length		Surface
Direction	m	ft	Surface
07/25	1,200	3,937	Concrete

Taiping Island Airport (Chinese: 太平島機場; pinyin: Tàipíng Dǎo Jīchǎng) is an airport on Taiping Island, Cijin District, Kaohsiung, Taiwan. It is located in the Spratly Islands of the South China Sea. The island (named Itu Aba before 1946) has been stationed by the Republic of China (Taiwan) with military personnel since 1956.

== Background ==
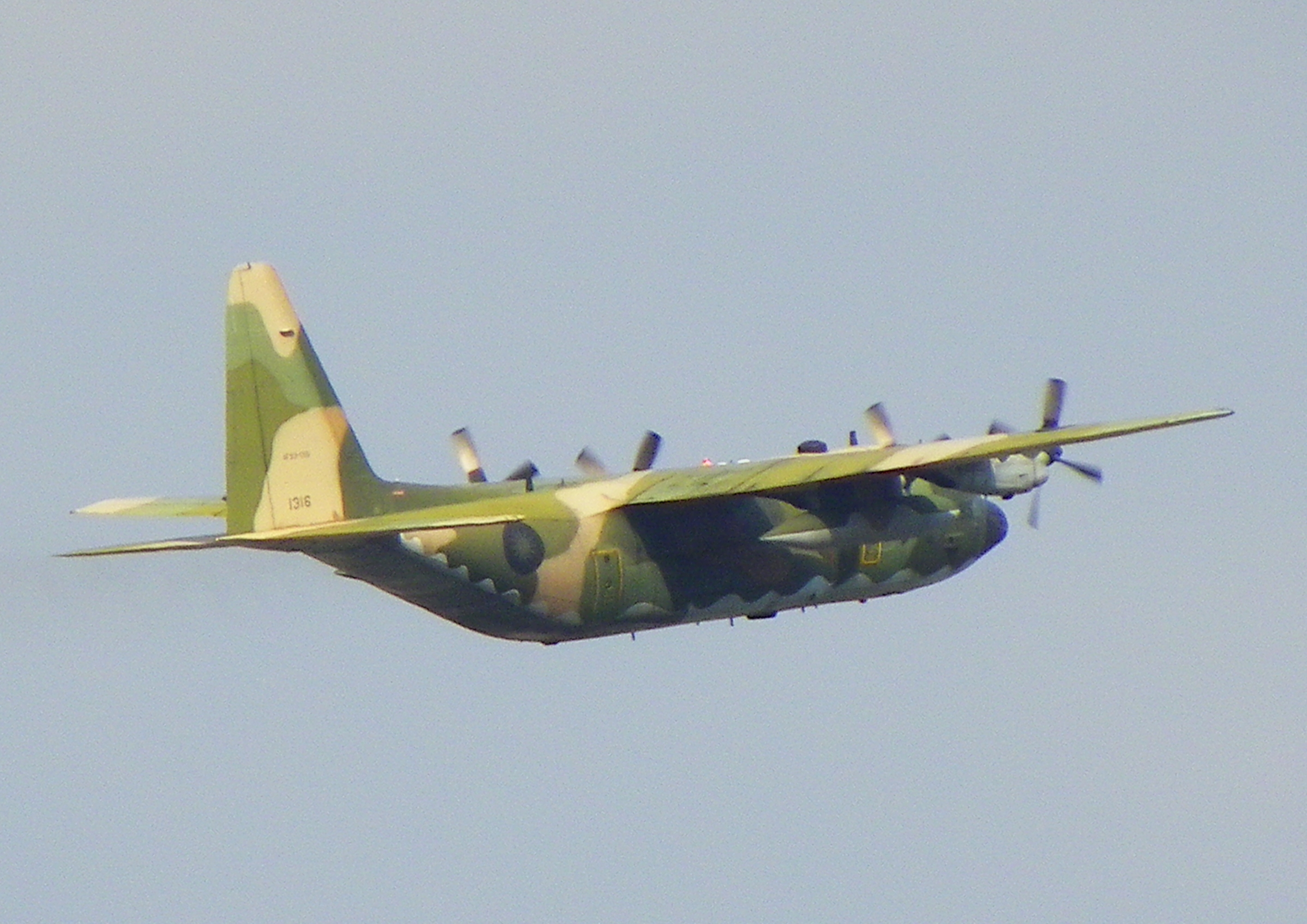
A ROC Air Force C-130H similar to the one pictured makes regular flights to Taiping Island.

Once every two months, a Republic of China Air Force C-130 transport aircraft arrives from Taiwan which provides personnel transportation and material supplies for the entire island. There are no other regular scheduled flights.

== Airlines and destinations ==
Airlines	Destinations
Republic of China Air Force	Military Charter: Kaohsiung

== See also ==
- Dongsha Island Airport (Pratas Island)
- Yongxing Island Airport (Woody Island in the Paracel Islands)
- List of airports in the Spratly Islands
- List of maritime features in the Spratly Islands
- Layang-Layang Airport
