= Swallow Reef =

Oceanic atoll of the Spratly Islands administered by Malaysia

Disputed atoll
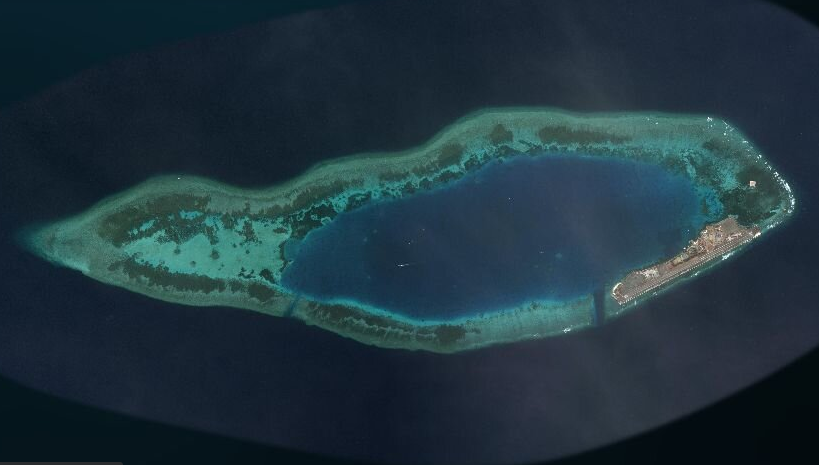
- Satellite image of Swallow Reef by NASA.

- Location within Spratly Islands
- Other names: Pulau Layang-Layang (Malay); Đá Hoa Lau (Vietnamese) 彈丸礁, 燕子島, 拉央拉央岛 (Chinese); Celerio Reef (Philippine English); Bahura ng Celerio (Filipino)

Geography
- Location: South China Sea
- Coordinates: 7°22′20″N 113°50′30″E
- Archipelago: Spratly Islands
- Area: 35 ha (86 acres)

Administration
- Malaysia
- State: Sabah

Claimed by
- China
- Province: Hainan
- City: Sansha
- Taiwan
- Municipality: Kaohsiung
- District: Cijin
- Vietnam
- Province: Khanh Hoa
- District: Truong Sa

Additional information
- Malaysian population: 70; Malaysian postal code: 88005

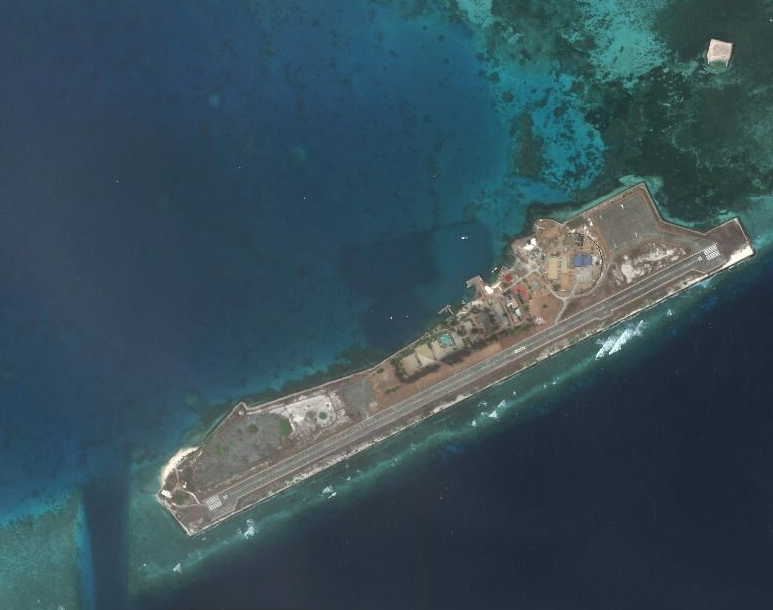
Layang-Layang Island

Swallow Reef, also known as Malay: Pulau Layang-Layang; Vietnamese: Đá Hoa Lau; Mandarin Chinese: 燕子島; pinyin: Yànzi Dǎo; Celerio Reef (Filipino: Bahura ng Celerio), is an oceanic atoll of the Spratly Islands administered by Malaysia.

The Royal Malaysian Navy (RMN) has maintained a presence on the reef since 1983, but as with all of the Spratly Islands, the ownership is disputed, and it is also claimed by the People's Republic of China, the Republic of China (Taiwan) and Vietnam. The Philippines does not lay claim to Swallow Reef.

== Geography ==
The atoll lies some 300 km (190 mi) north-west of Kota Kinabalu, Sabah. It is about 7 kilometres (4.3 mi) long and 2 kilometres (1.2 mi) wide with a central lagoon. The part of the atoll above sea level is a reef on the south-east rim which had an original land area of 6.2 hectares (15 acres), which with subsequent reclamation now covers 35 ha (86 acres), measuring over 1.5 km (0.93 mi) long and 200 m (660 ft) wide.

=== Climate ===
Swallow Reef is located within the equatorial belt and has an equatorial climate. It is closed to tourists from November to January each year due to heavy monsoon rains, however, Malaysian Armed Forces personnel operate on the island year-long. Temperatures range from 24 to 32 °C (75 to 90 °F). Although an equatorial climate comes with fairly high humidity, there are cooling sea breezes.

=== Important Bird Area ===
The island has been designated an Important Bird Area (IBA) by BirdLife International because it regularly supports a significant breeding colony of greater crested terns, with 750–2,550 individual birds recorded.

== History ==
On 21 June 1980, a plaque was erected on the reef by Malaysia's PASKAL special forces.

In May 1983, eighteen PASKAL members built their first encampment, signifying the start of the Royal Malaysian Navy's presence. At the time, the only infrastructure available was a helipad for personnel transfer, and the special forces had to camp under the open skies on the bare reef. Naval Station "Lima" was constructed in April 1986, consisting of a small living-cum-operations centre.

In 1989, the government decided to develop the island into a tourist spot. By 1991, the resort had completed construction and had developed into a comfortable and popular diving spot. By 1995, more buildings were added, including two air-conditioned accommodation blocks, an aircraft landing strip, two hangars, a radar station, an air traffic control tower, watchtowers and a jetty. The resort had its operating license revoked in 2025, forcing it to close.

On 20 July 2003, the Layang-Layang Airport expansion which increased the length of the runway from 1,064 metres (3,490 ft) to 1,367 metres (4,480 ft) was completed. As a result, the length of the island increased from 1.2 kilometres (0.75 mi) to over 1.5 kilometres (0.93 mi).

In July 2004, a marine research facility, MARSAL (Marine Research Station Pulau Layang-Layang) was opened.

On 5 March 2009, Abdullah Ahmad Badawi, the Malaysian Prime Minister of the time, visited the island.

== Tourism ==
The island has gained recognition as a destination for scuba divers. Layang Layang is especially known for the hammerhead sharks during the May mating season, among a variety of marine life including pygmy seahorses, jack fish, barracuda and manta rays. Its air transport needs are served by the Layang-Layang Airport.

=== Gallery ===
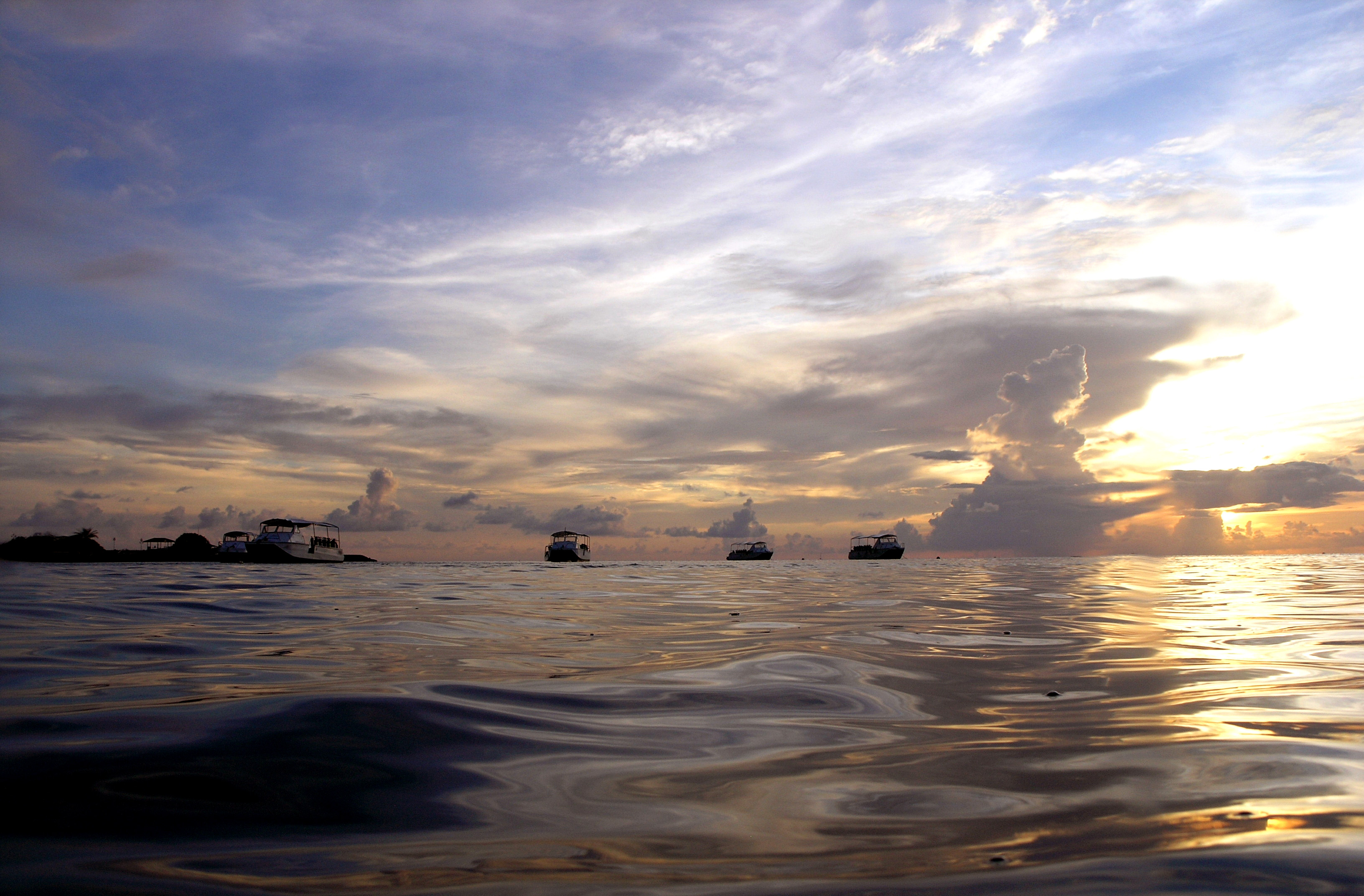

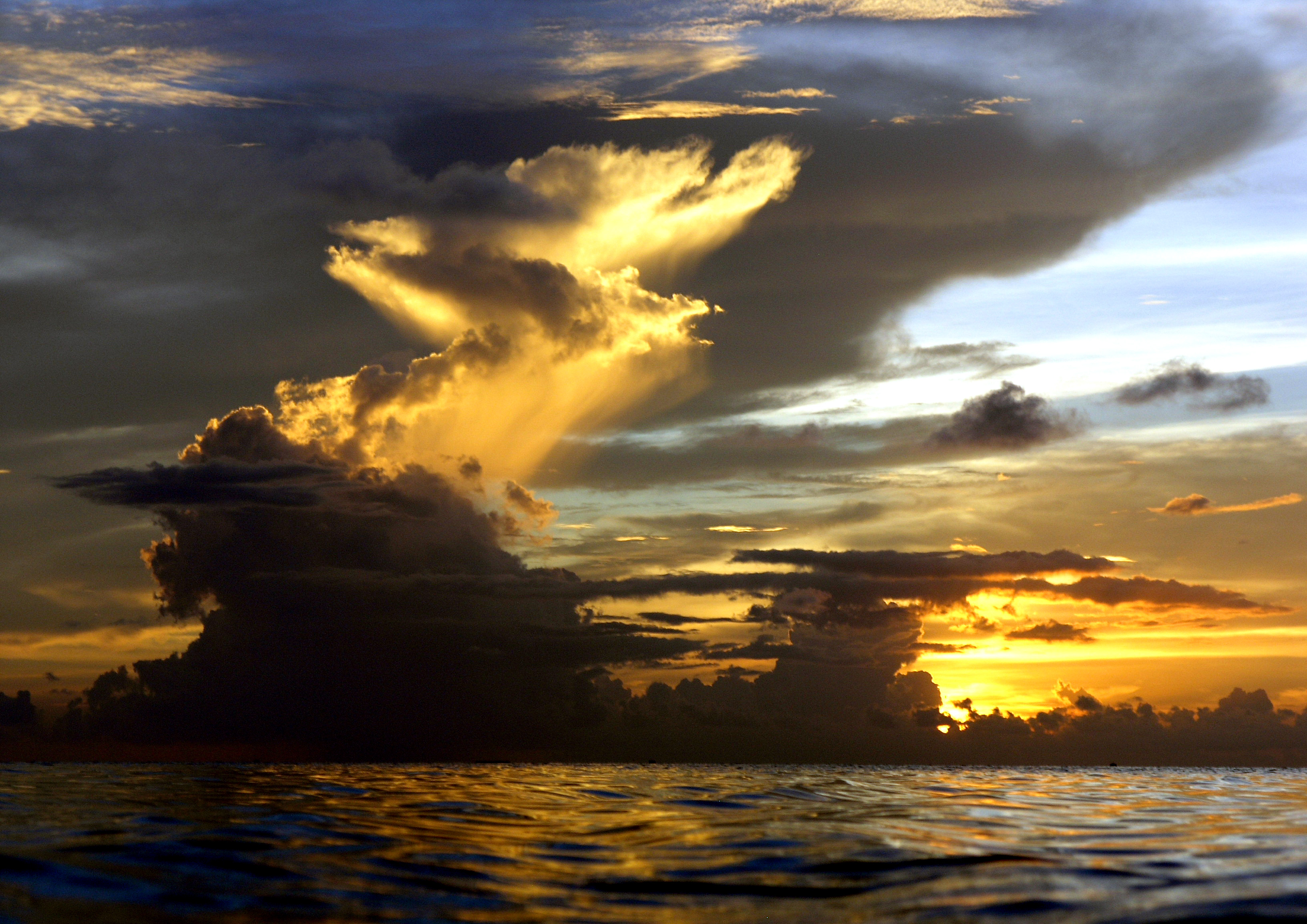

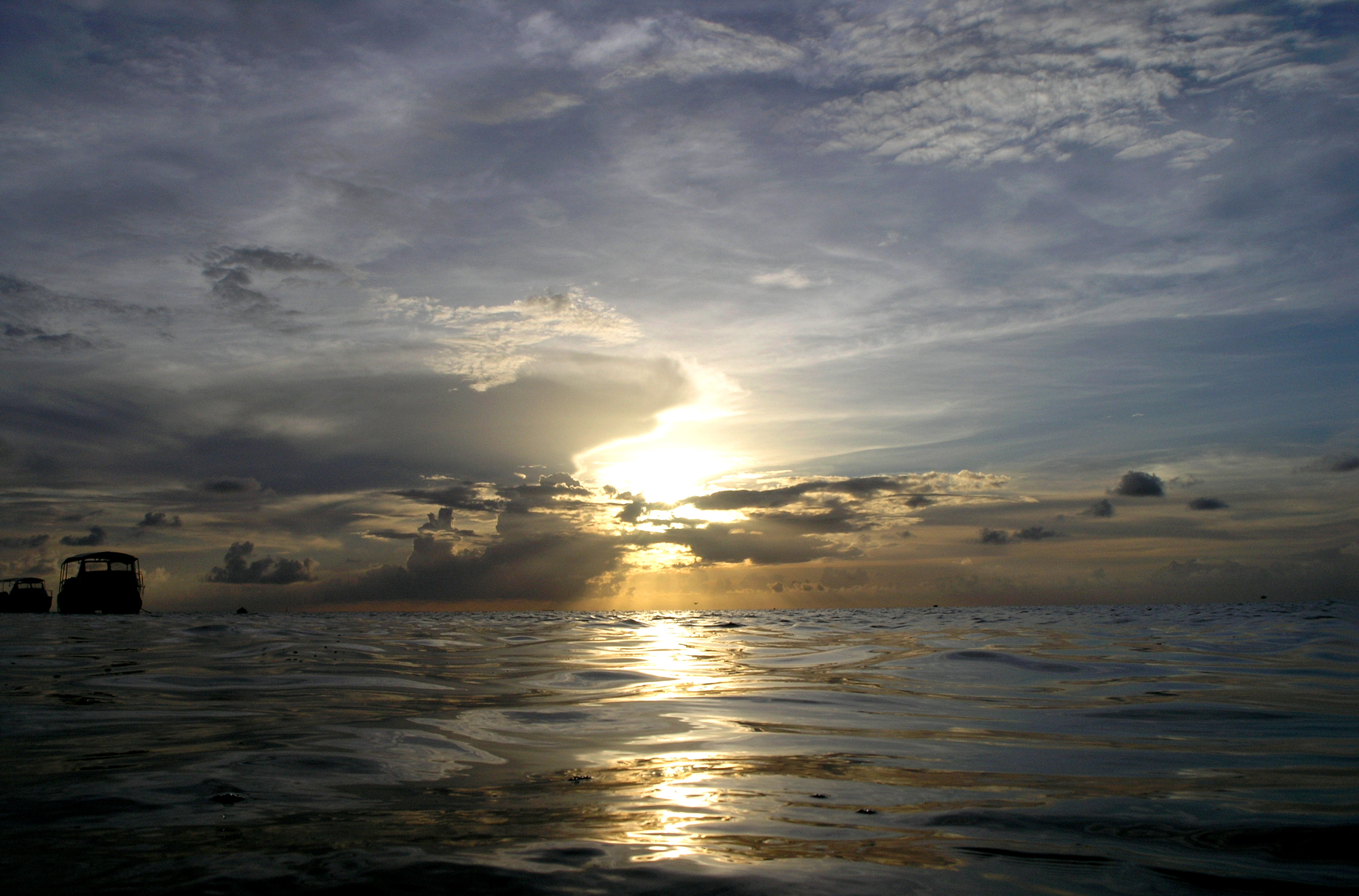

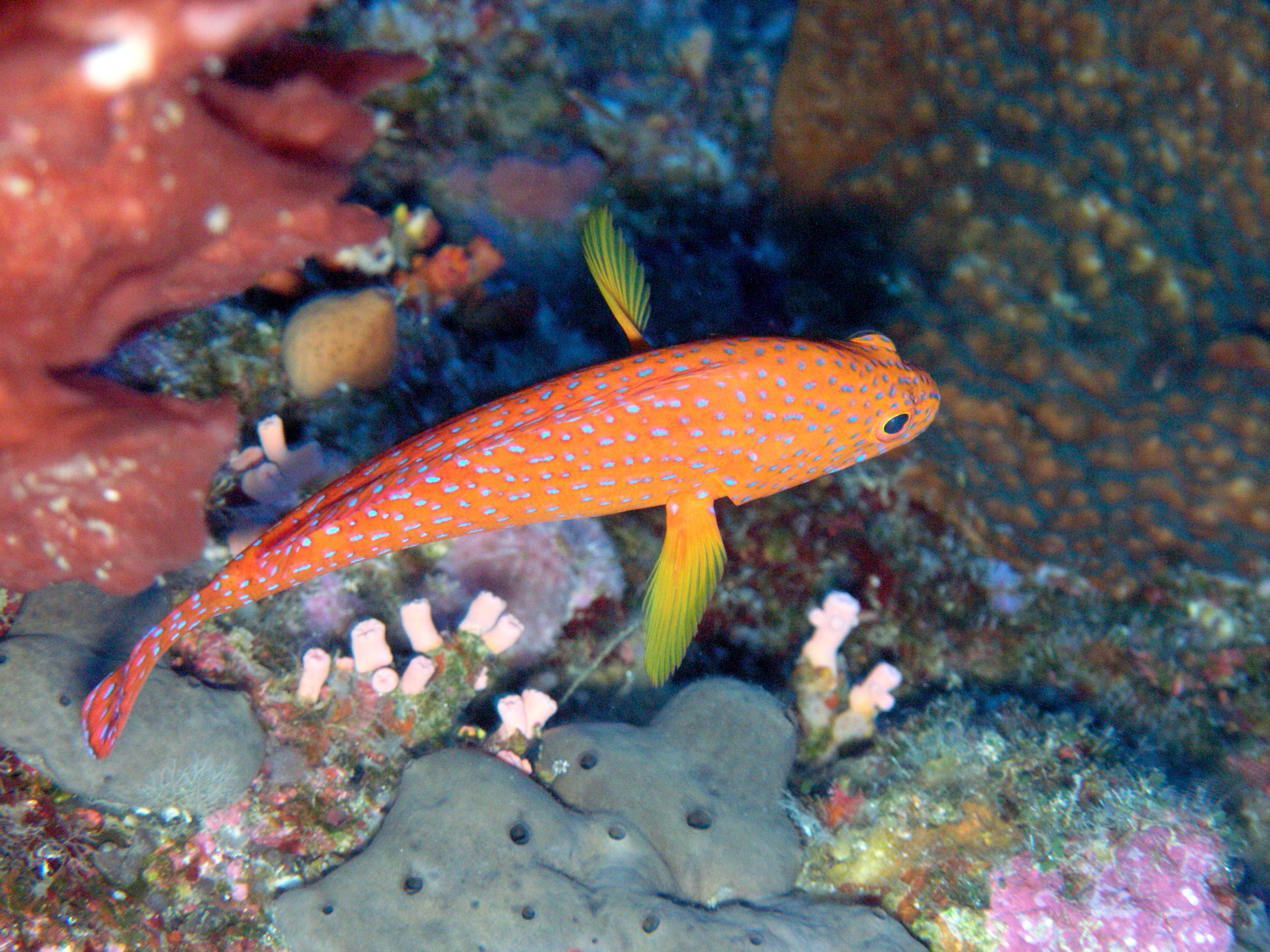

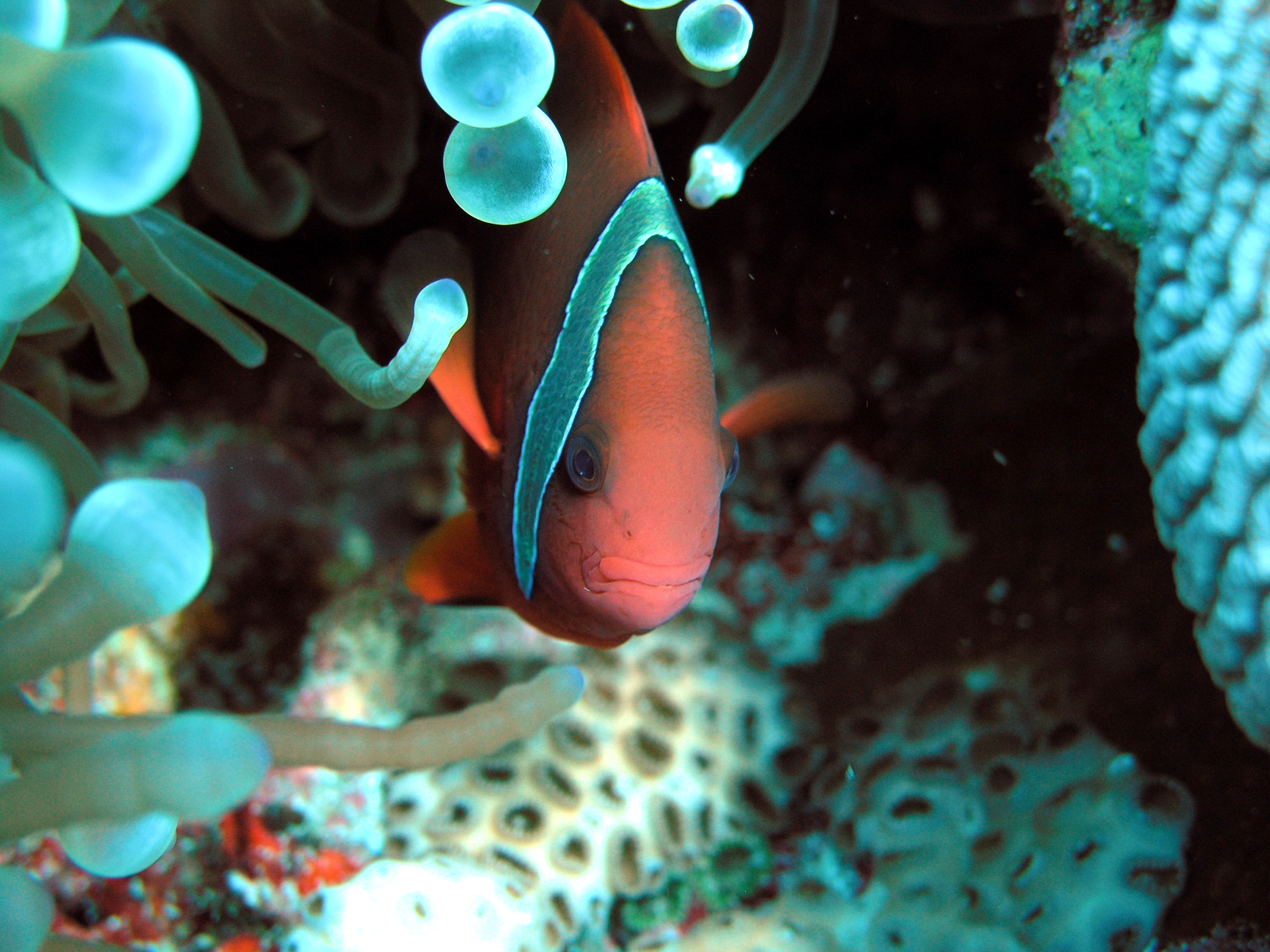

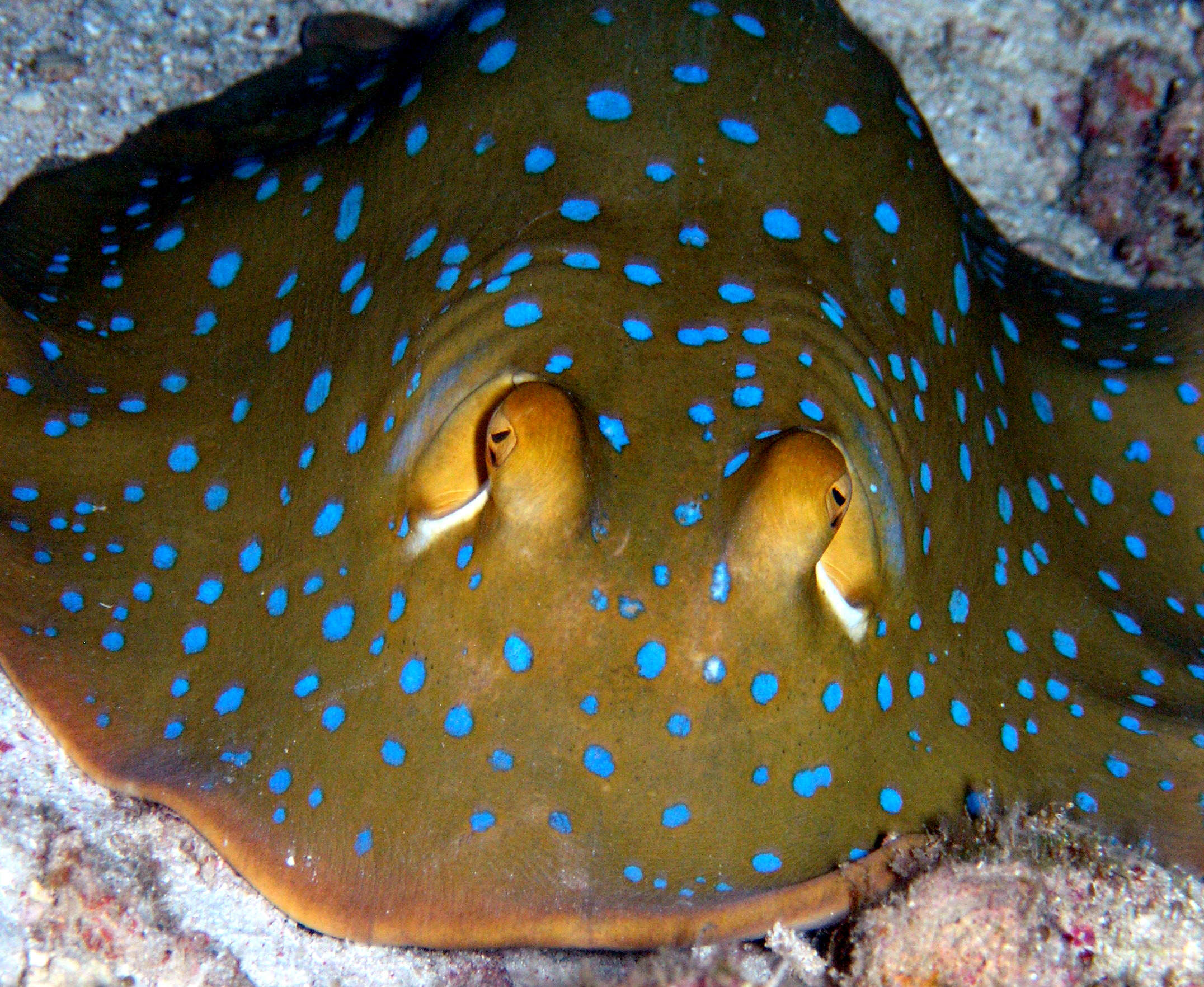

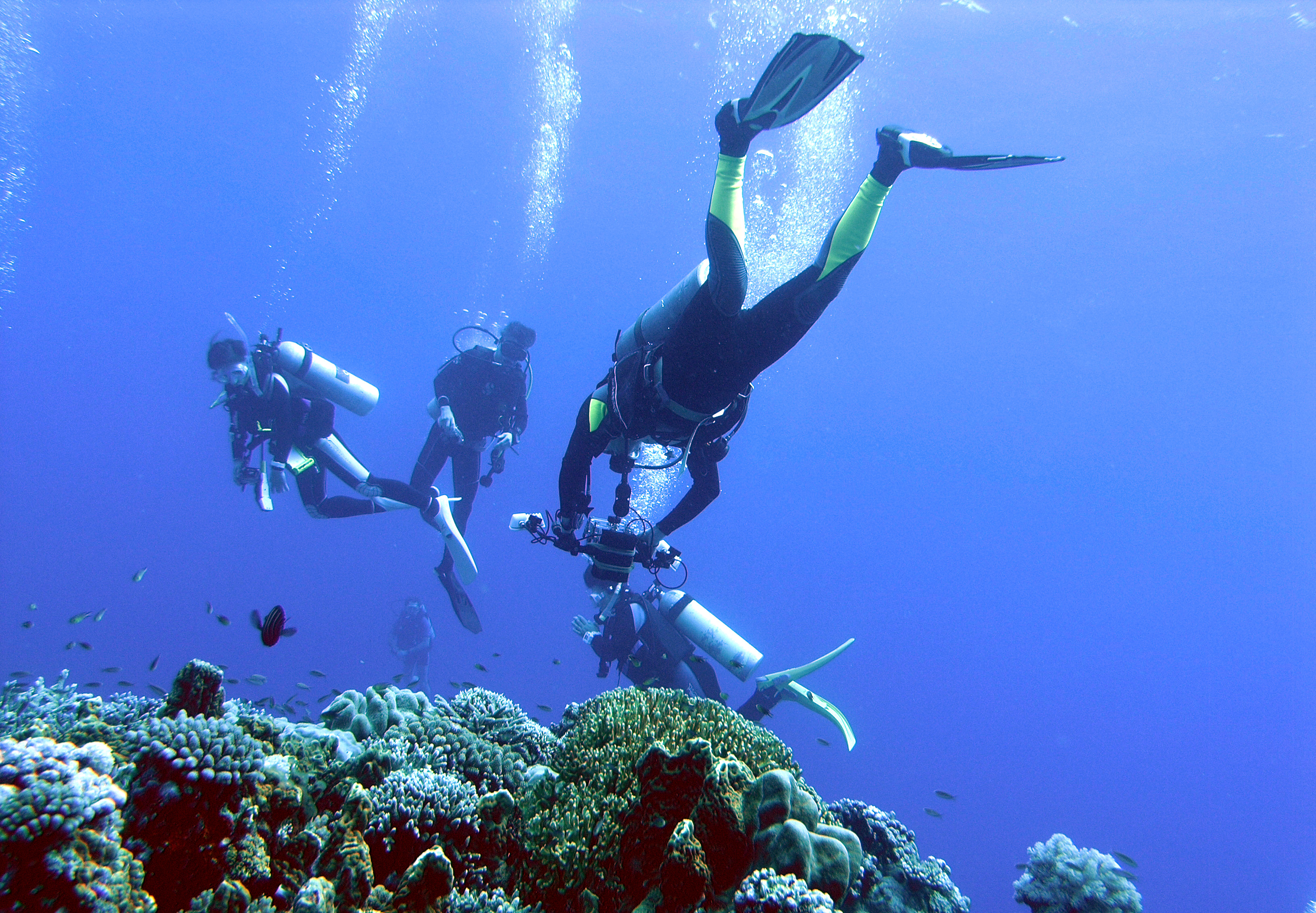

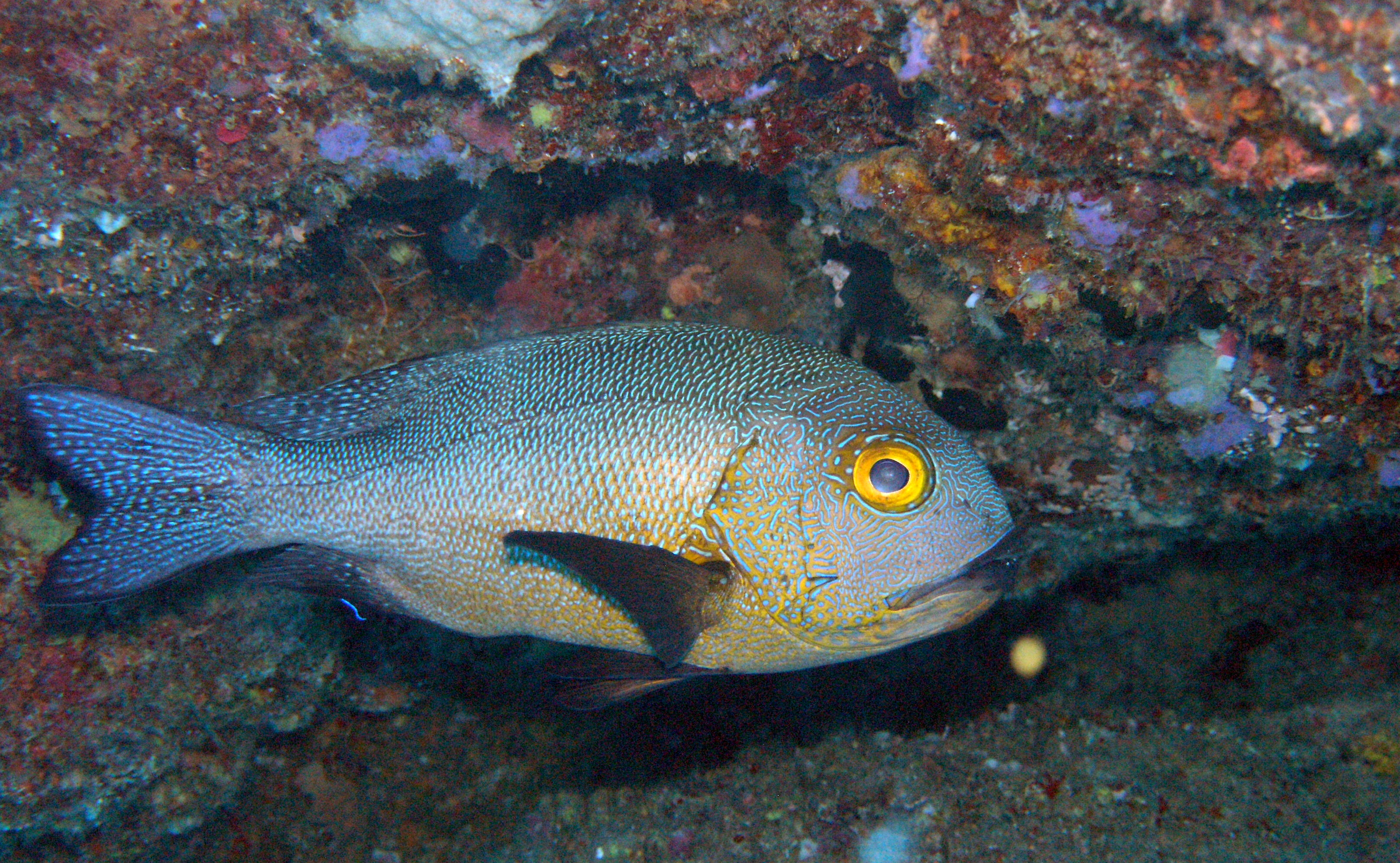

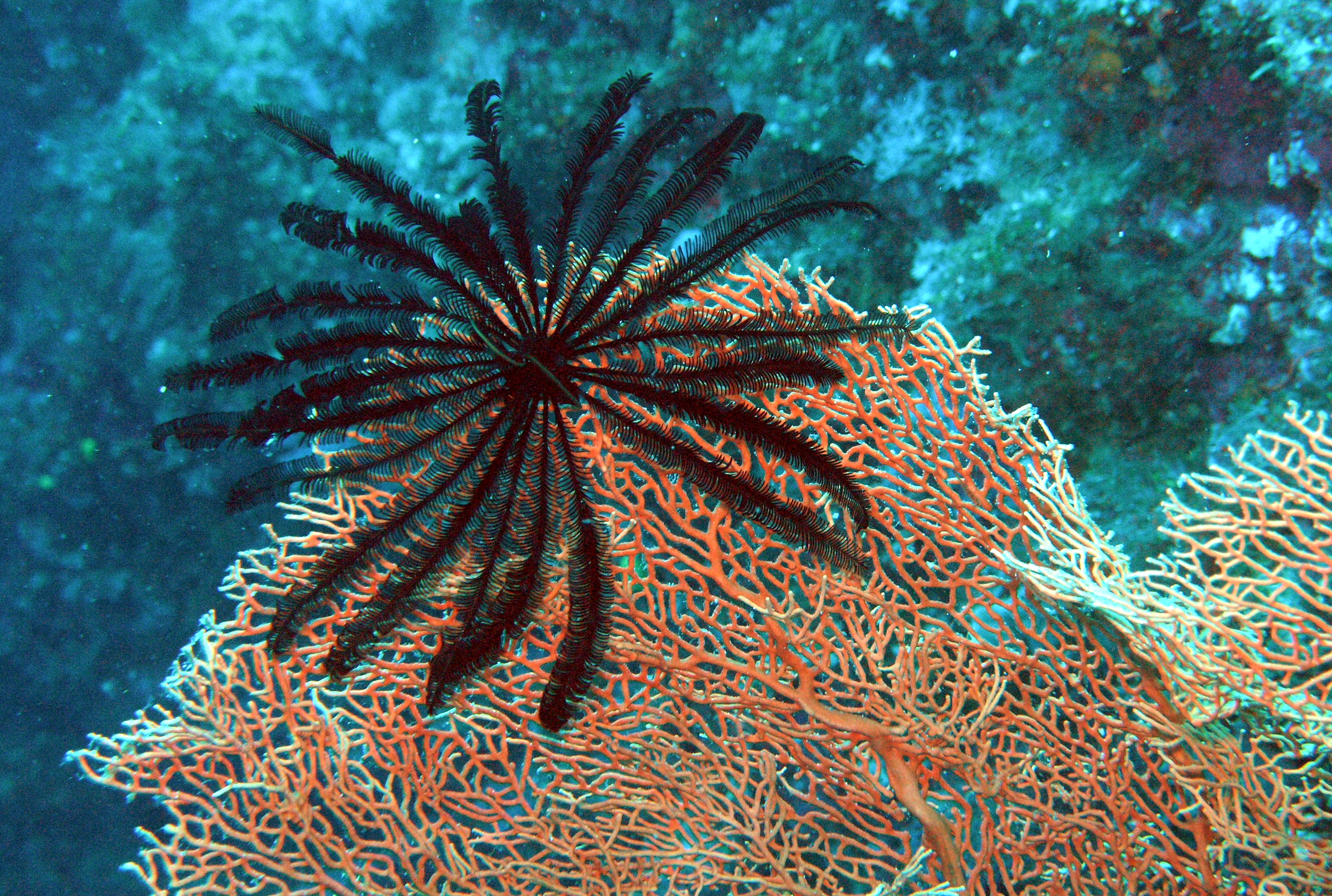

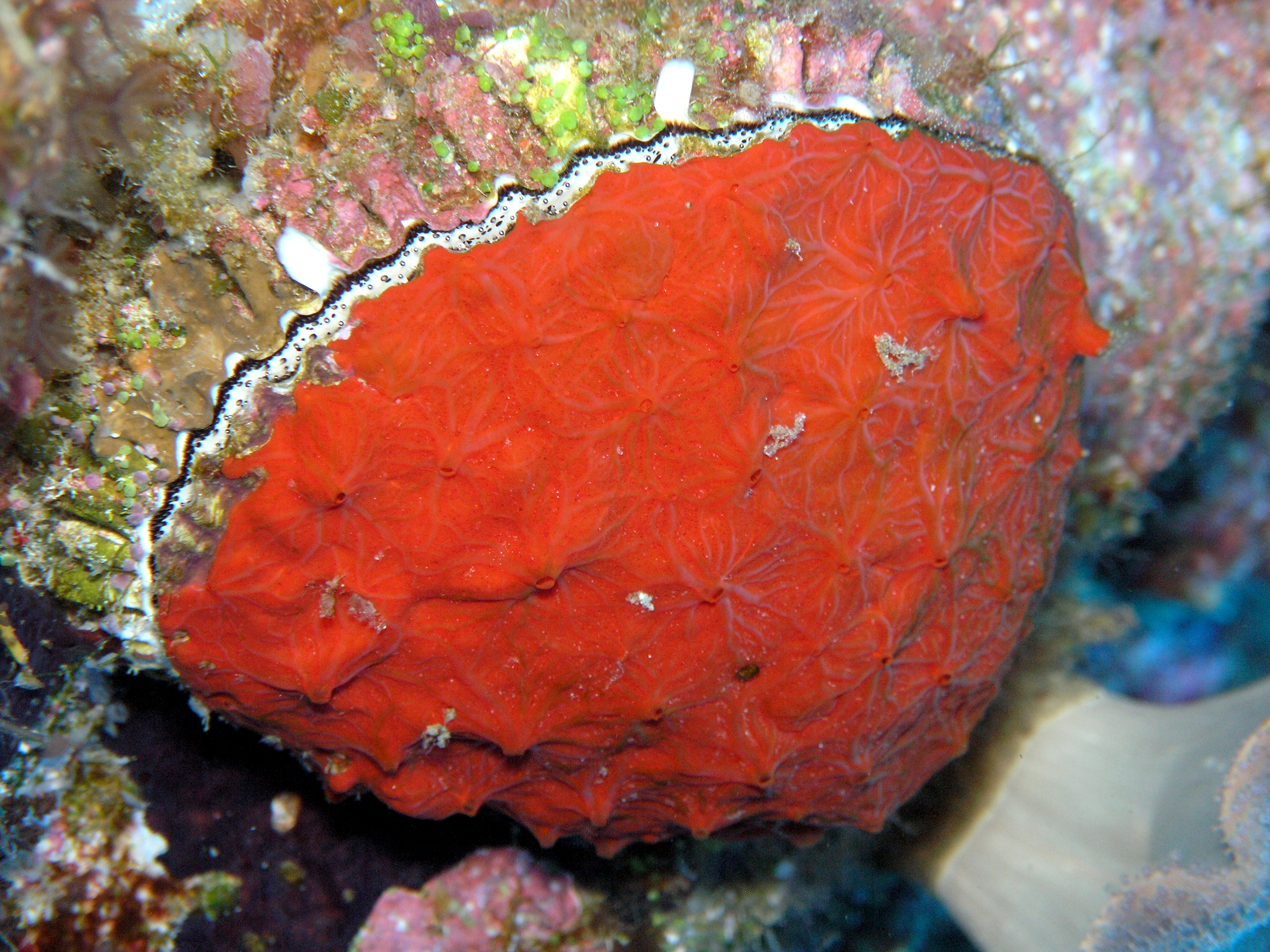

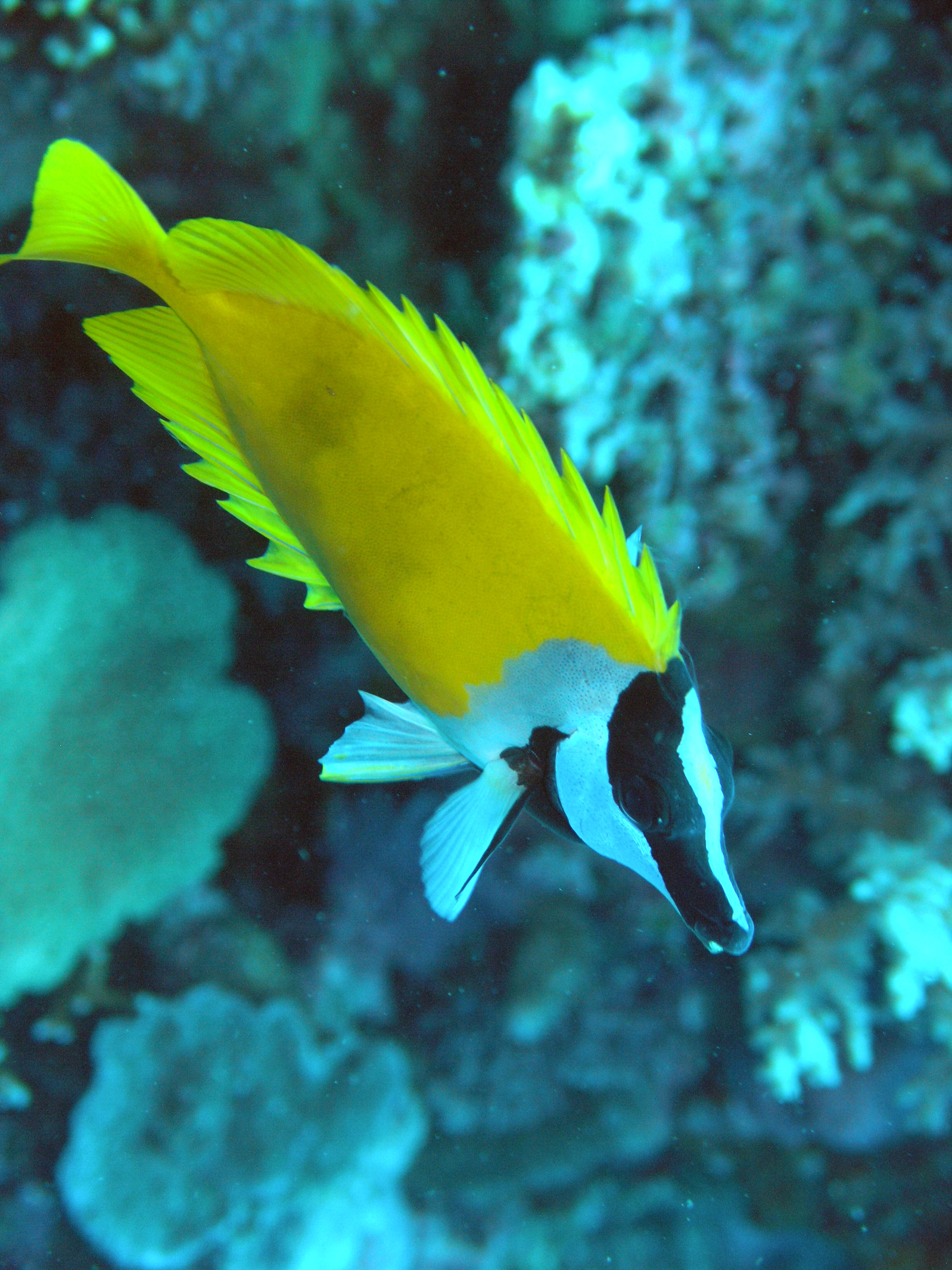

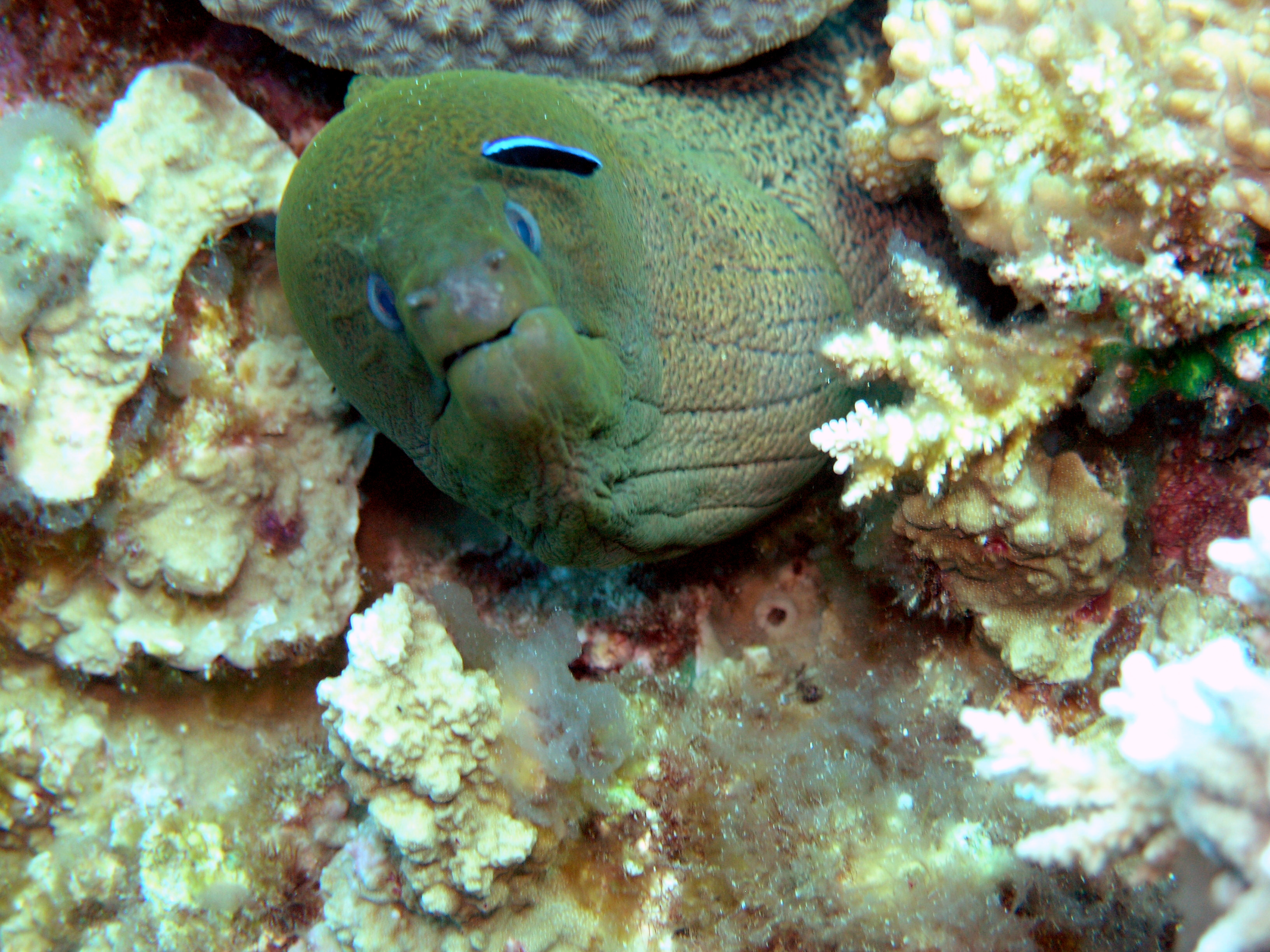

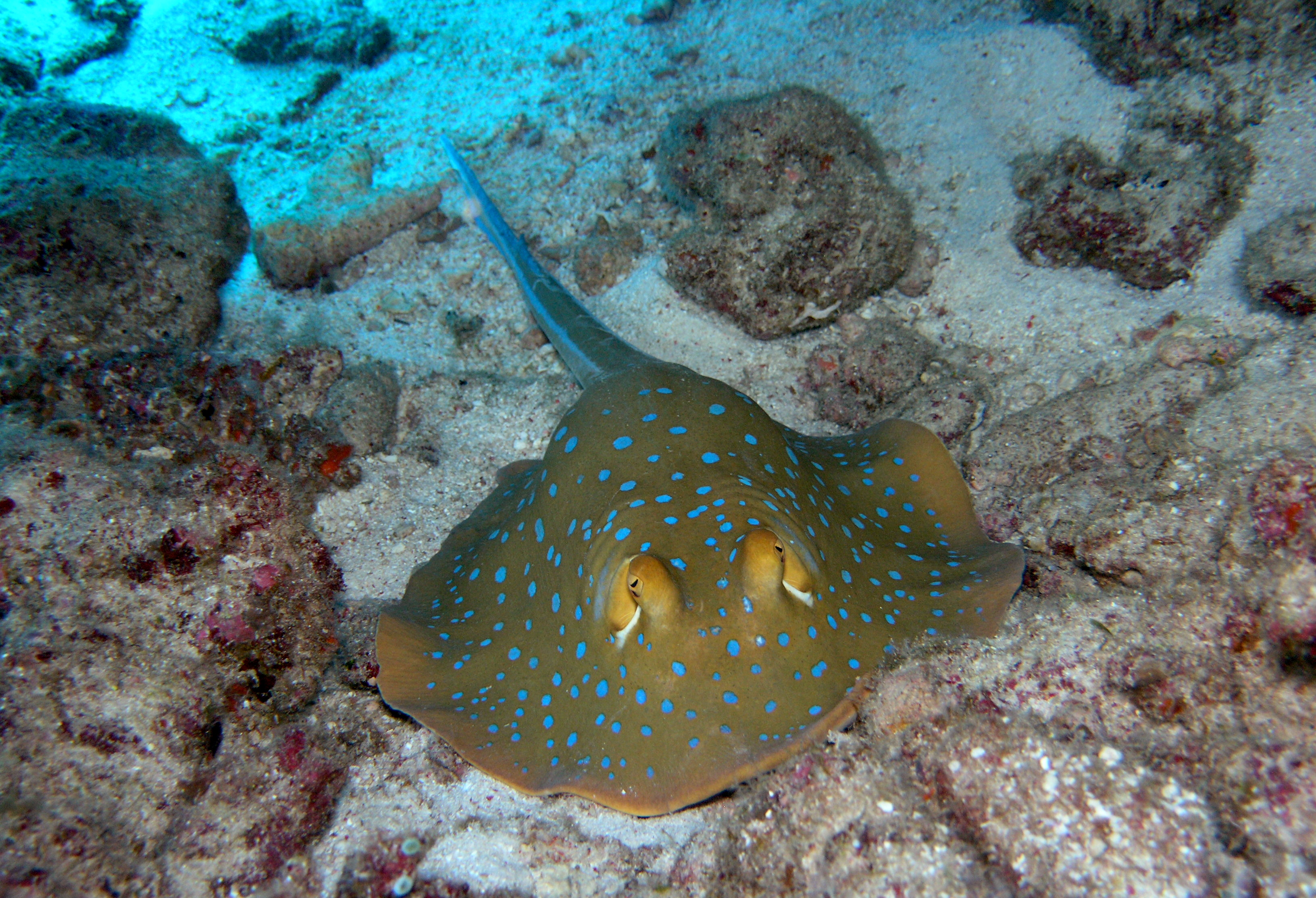

== Facilities and access ==
=== Layang-Layang Airport ===
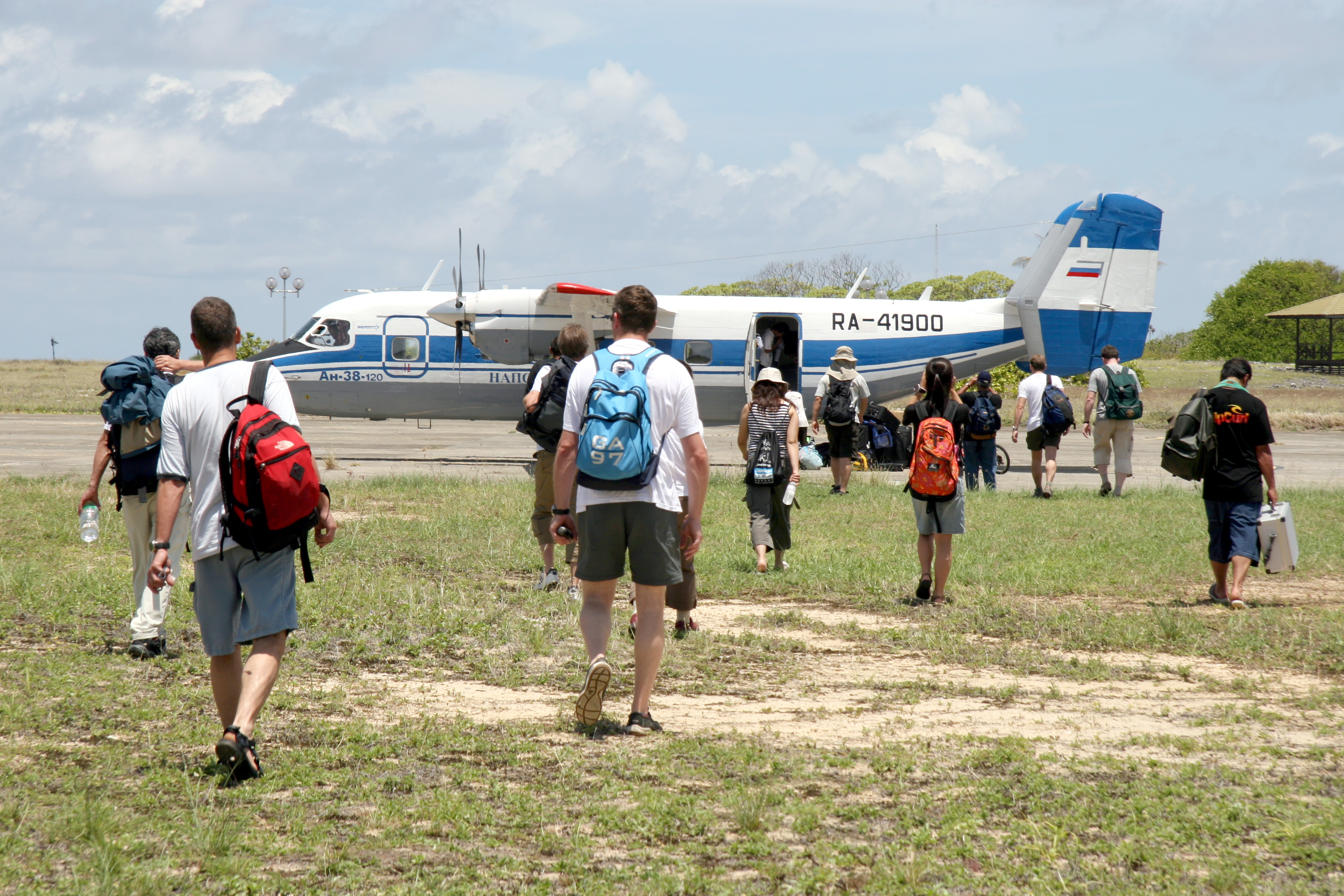
Tourists returning to their plane after visiting the reef.

The airport consists of a paved aircraft runway, two aircraft hangars, a radar station, an air traffic control tower and watchtowers. The runway, made of concrete, is 1,367 metres (4,485 ft) long and 28 metres (92 ft) wide. The runway has a Pavement Classification Number of 032RBXU, indicating that the runway is a medium strength rigid pavement, with a high maximum tire pressure.

The Royal Malaysian Air Force uses CN-235 and C-130 Hercules aircraft as well as CN-235 maritime patrol aircraft and Nuri helicopters for access to the island.

The only civilian flight route to Swallow Reef is a one-hour flight from Sabah's capital Kota Kinabalu. Layang Layang Aerospace is the only airline that services this route, using its fleet of Nomad N22C planes. A return ticket must be purchased before departure from Kota Kinabalu International Airport.

=== Naval Station Lima ===
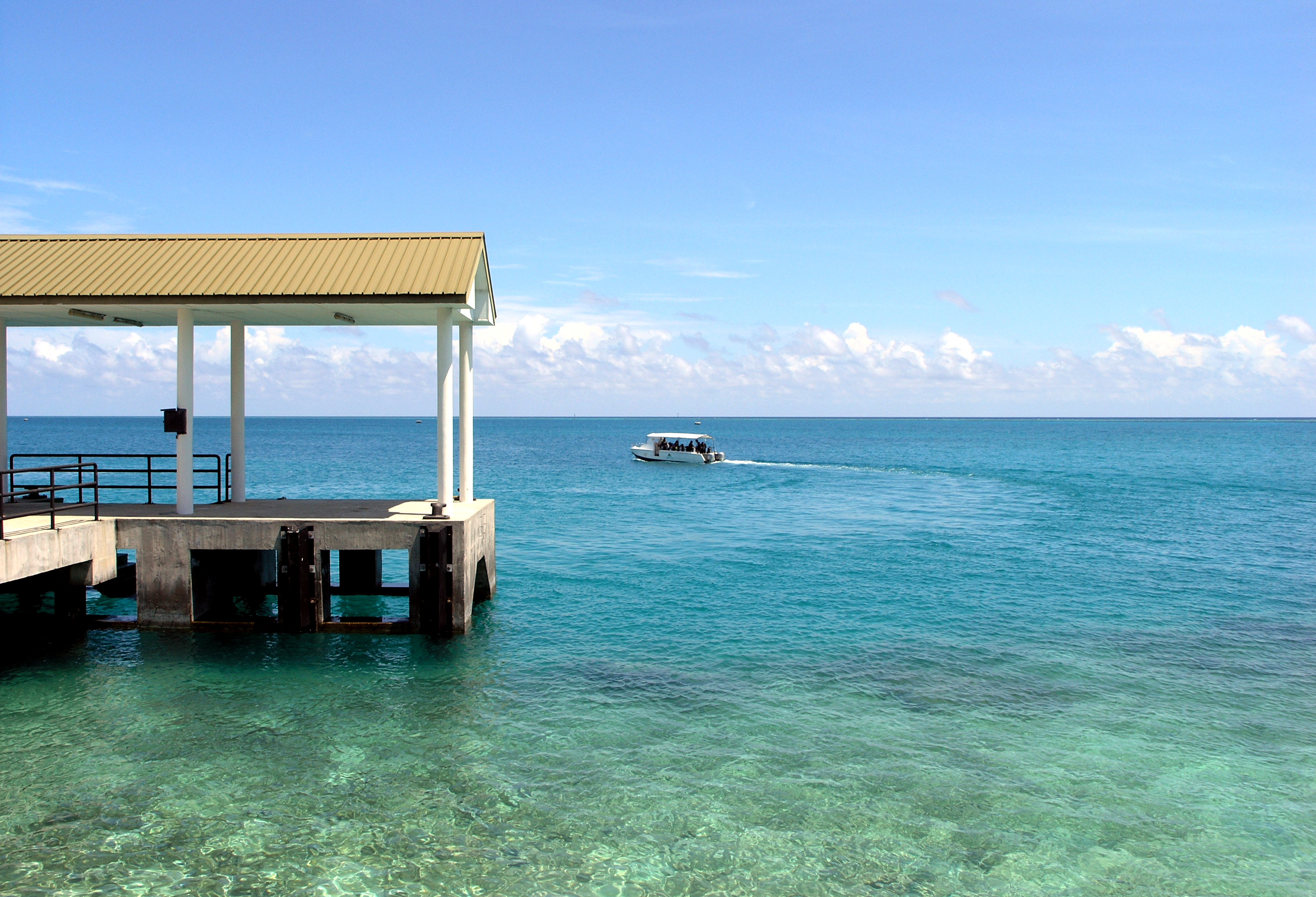
Station Lima jetty

The jetty is located inside the lagoon of the submerged atoll, and has access to the sea through a man-made path cleared of corals.

The Royal Malaysian Navy uses CB90 boats for access to the area and also stations the boats on the island for patrols in the area.

The Royal Malaysian Navy has maintained an "offshore naval station" on the island since 1983, and CB90 assault craft based in the station patrol the surrounding waters. Several anti-ship and anti-aircraft guns are placed around the reef, and the personnel operate a Starburst air defence system to prevent low level attacks on the island.

The naval personnel are normally stationed on the island on a three-month rotational deployment, transferring from Kota Kinabalu, where the Naval Area Base II (Mawila II) is located.

=== Marine Research Station ===
The Malaysian Fisheries department operates a marine research facility, MARSAL (Marine Research Station Pulau Layang-Layang) on the island.

=== Layang-Layang Resort ===
Layang-Layang is a 3 star resort located on the island open from 28 February – 1 September. It has 86 rooms and shares the look of a Borneo Longhouse, the traditional community homes of Borneo's tribal people. The resort's restaurant serves Asian and Western Cuisine. There are also fresh water swimming pools and a body massage and foot reflexology centre called Raba Raba House.

The resort's license to operate was revoked by the Malaysian government on January 6, 2025, forcing it to close.

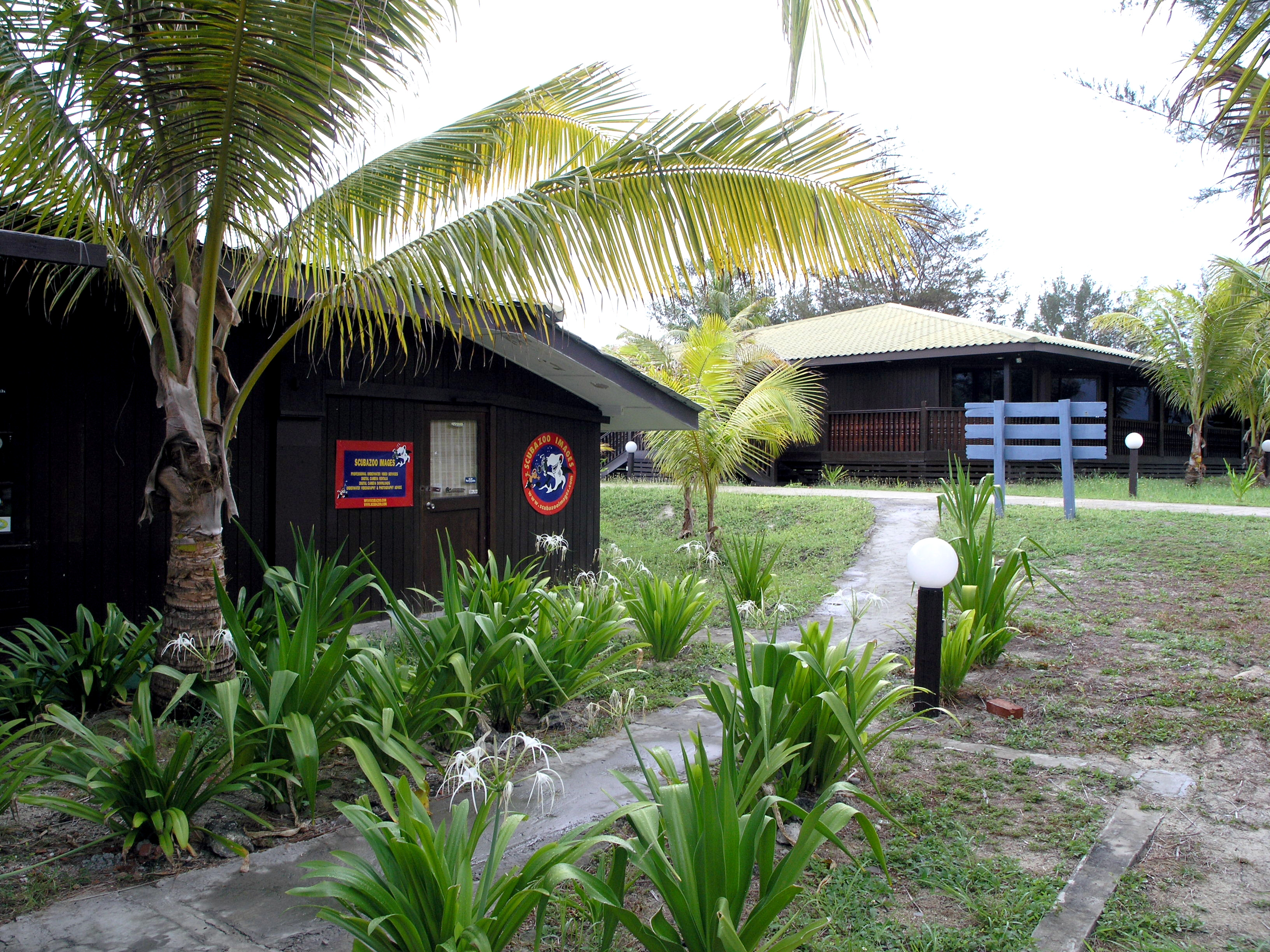

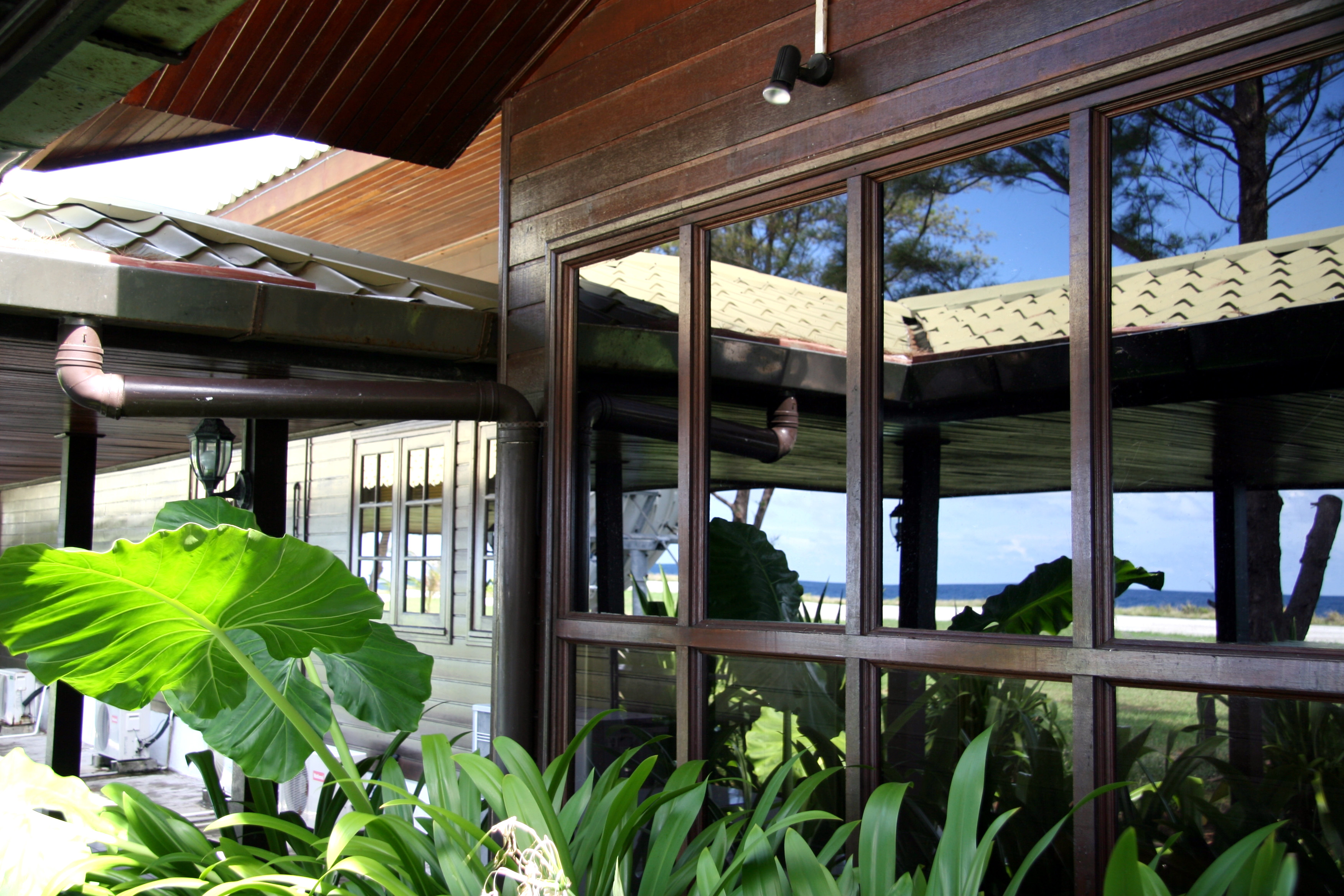

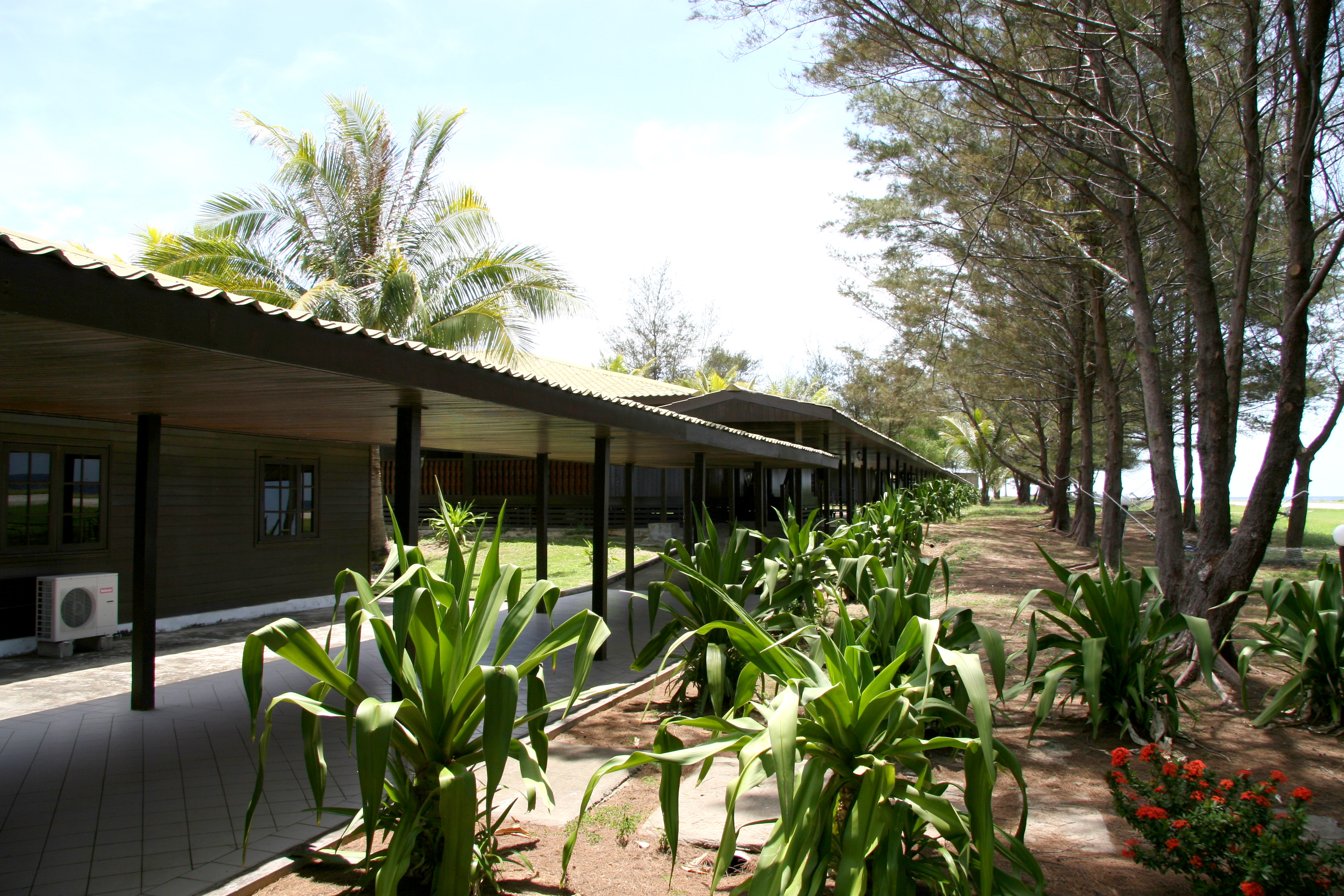

=== Utilities ===
==== Electricity ====
The main power source of the island comes from diesel generators. On the naval station, there is a large windmill maintained by state-owned power company Tenaga Nasional which harnesses power from wind speeds of up to 50 knots (93 km/h; 58 mph) to provide additional electricity supply to the base.

==== Water ====
The island's clean water supply of 57 tons per day is obtained from a distilled water processing plant.

==== Postal service ====
In 2015, Malaysia launched a postcode for those living on the island.

==== Communications ====
Internet services are currently been improved and mobile connectivities will be improved from 2G to 4G by Malaysian Communications and Multimedia Commission.

== See also ==
- List of airports in the Spratly Islands
