= Zhubi Airport =

Airport in Sansha, People's Republic of China

Subi Airport
- IATA: none; ICAO: none

Summary
- Airport type: Dual-use
- Owner/Operator: People's Liberation Army Navy
- Serves: Subi Reef
- Location: Sansha city, Hainan province, China
- Time zone: China Standard Time (UTC+8)
- Coordinates: 10°55′32.5″N 114°4′18.6″E

Map
- Location within Hainan

Runways
Direction	Length		Surface
Direction	ft	m	Surface
03/21	10,662	3,250	Concrete

Zhubi Airport is a dual-use airport on Subi Reef located in Spratly Islands.

== History ==
Construction began in August 2015.

On July 12, 2016, the Chinese government used a Cessna CE-680 aircraft from the Civil Aviation Flight Check Center of China to conduct a check flight on the newly built airport and it succeeded.

On July 13, 2016, the Chinese government requisitioned a civil airliner of Hainan Airlines. It departed from Haikou Meilan International Airport and landed at the newly built airport. It returned in the afternoon of the same day to complete the test flight.

== Facilities ==
Subi Airport has a 3,250-metre (10,660 ft) x 60-metre (200 ft) runway, a terminal building, 20 hangars, and 2 helicopter platforms. While airport can be used by civilian aircraft no schedule airline currently uses this airport.
