= Subi Reef =

Disputed reef in the Spratly Islands

Disputed island
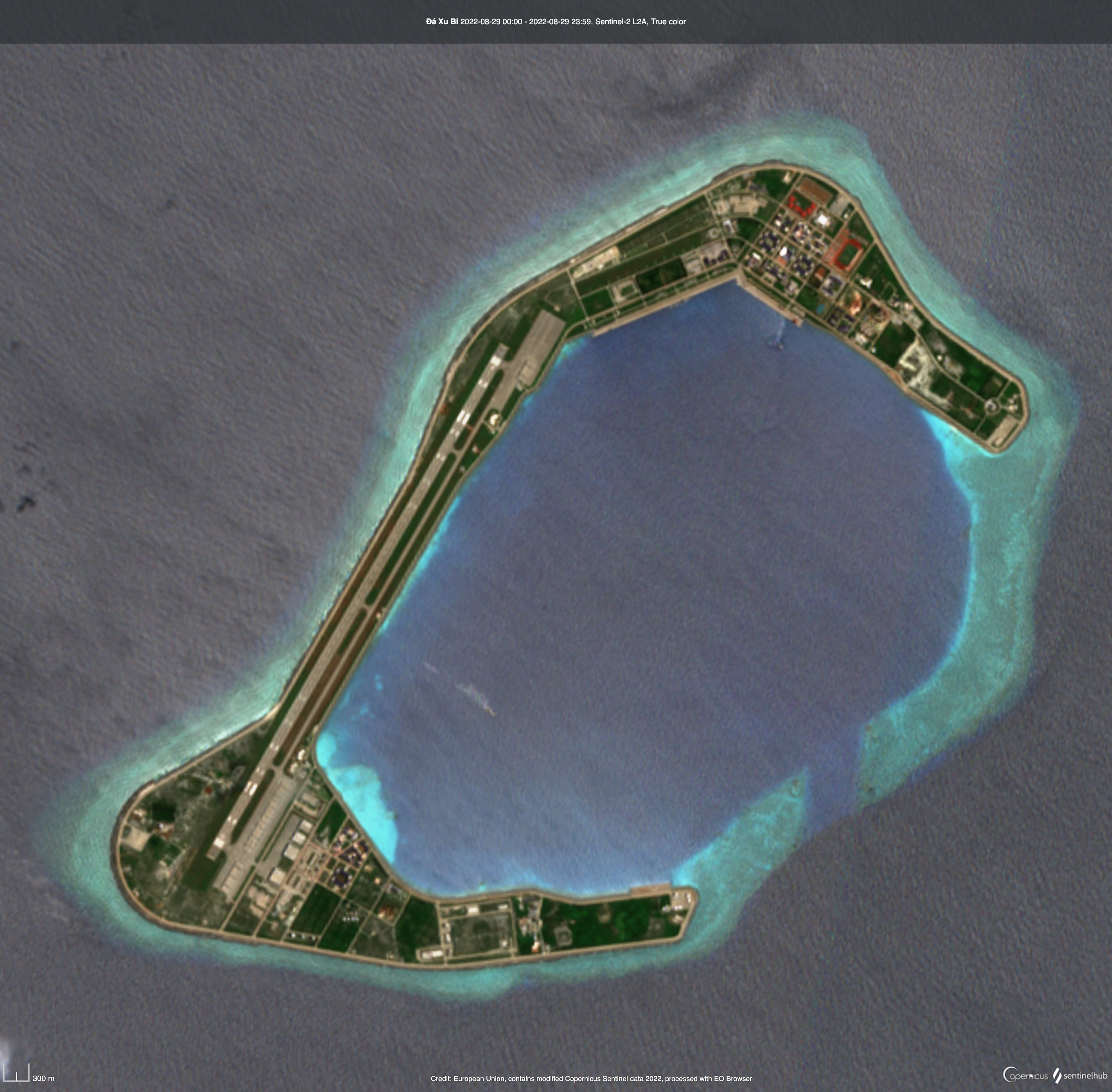
- Sentinel-2 Image (October 2022)

- Location within Spratly Islands
- Other names: Zhubi Reef 渚碧礁 Zhǔbì Jiāo (Chinese); Zamora Reef (Philippine English); Bahura ng Zamora (Filipino) đá Xu Bi (Vietnamese)

Geography
- Location: South China Sea
- Coordinates: 10.9133°N 114.062°E
- Archipelago: Spratly Islands
- Area: 0 km^{2} (0 sq mi) (Natural); 3.95 km^{2} (1.53 sq mi) (Reclaimed)

Administration
- China
- Province: Hainan
- prefecture-level city: Sansha
- District: Nansha District

Claimed by
- China
- Philippines
- Taiwan
- Vietnam

Subi Reef, also known as Xu Bi Reef (Vietnamese: Đá Xu Bi), Zamora Reef (Filipino: Bahura ng Zamora, lit. 'Reef of Zamora'), or Zhubi Reef (Chinese: 渚碧礁; pinyin: Zhǔbì Jiāo), is an atoll in the Spratly Islands of the South China Sea located 26 km (16 mi) southwest of Thitu Island. It is occupied by China, and claimed by the Philippines, Taiwan and Vietnam.

== Topography and features ==
The atoll measures 5.7 kilometres (3.5 mi) along its longer southwest–northeast axis, and is up to 3.5 kilometres (2.2 mi) wide. Its total area including the lagoon and rim of the atoll measures 16 square kilometres (6.2 sq mi), and the lagoon is up to 22 metres (72 ft) deep.

Naturally above water only at low tide, the atoll surrounds a lagoon. The People's Republic of China has constructed a 4-story building, a weather observation station with doppler weather radar, wharfs, and an airport in the area. A buoyed channel guides ships to the inner lagoon which is 3.7 kilometres (2.3 mi) in diameter.

== UNCLOS Maritime Ruling ==
On 12 July 2016, the UNCLOS special arbitral tribunal in the Philippines v. China case confirmed that Subi Reef is, or in its natural condition was, exposed at low tide and submerged at high tide and is, accordingly a low-tide elevation that does not generate entitlement to a territorial sea, exclusive economic zone or continental shelf, but is within 19 kilometres (12 mi) of a high-tide feature Sandy Cay on the atoll's west of Thitu Island.

As the Subi Reef is under the water, it is considered by the Third United Nations Conference on the Law of the Sea (UNCLOS III) as "sea bed" in "international waters". Although the PRC had ratified a limited UNCLOS III not allowing innocent passage of warships, according to the UNCLOS III, features built on the sea bed cannot have territorial waters.

== Environmental issues ==
The PRC has ratified UNCLOS III; the convention establishes general obligations for safeguarding the marine environment and protecting freedom of scientific research on the high seas, and also creates an innovative legal regime for controlling mineral resource exploitation in deep seabed areas beyond national jurisdiction, through an International Seabed Authority and the Common heritage of mankind principle.

== Territorial disputes ==
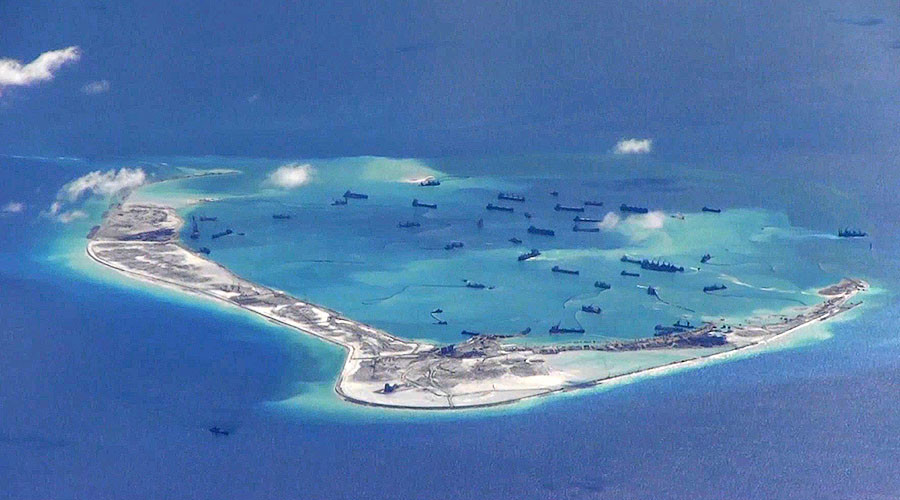
Subi Reef under reclamation by the PRC, May 2015.

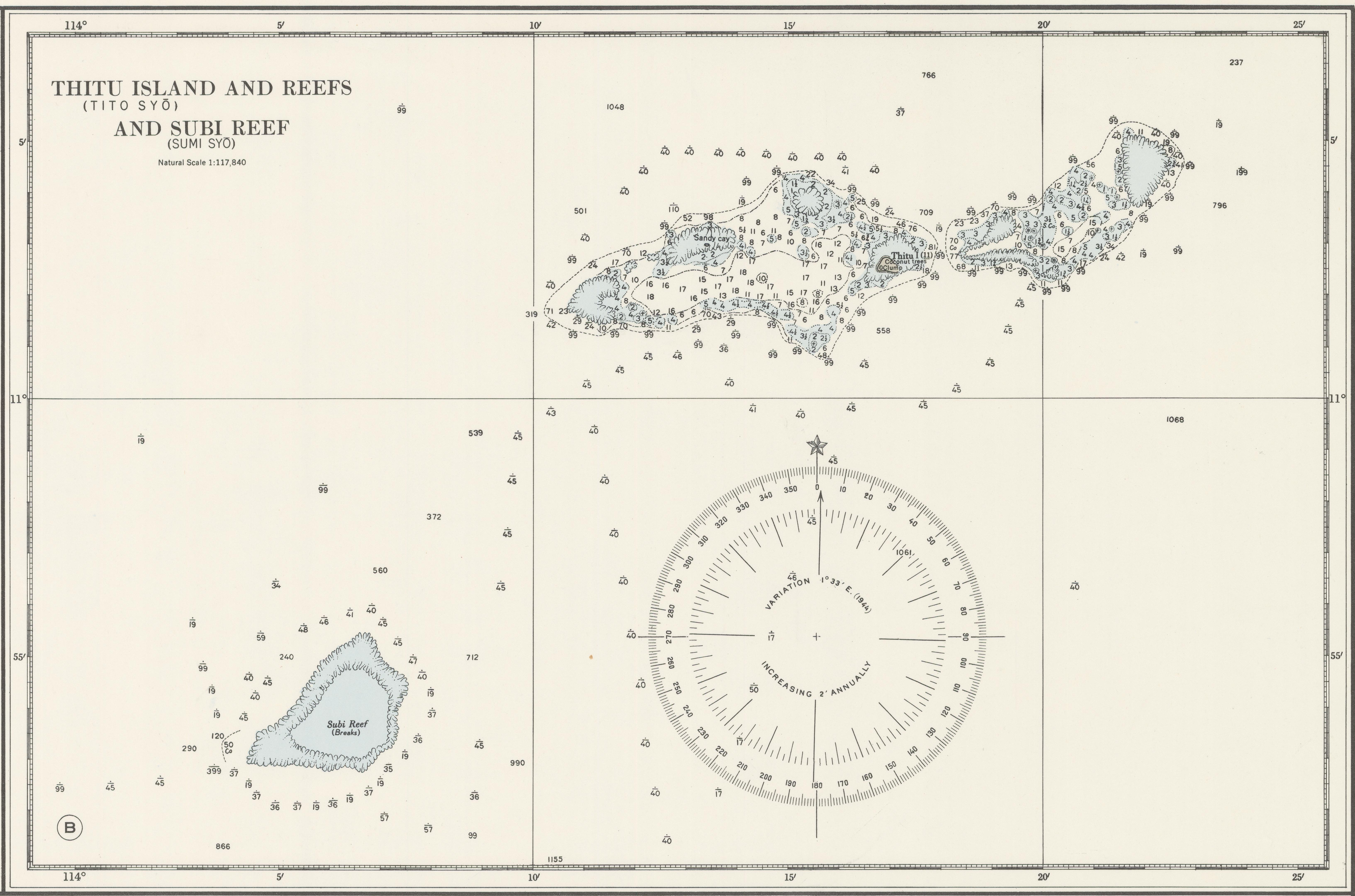
Subi Reef lower left on 1911 nautical chart

The atoll is controlled by China (PRC), with a 2014 estimate of 200 troops stationed there, and also claimed by Taiwan (ROC), Vietnam and the Philippines. In July 2012, a large fleet of 30 Chinese fishing vessels arrived at the atoll from Hainan.

In April 2015, a Philippine Navy aircraft patrolling near the atoll received "aggressive action" from a Chinese ship. Also in 2015, the USS Lassen sailed within 12 nautical miles (22 km; 14 mi) (which if applicable is the territorial waters limit of the atoll), prompting the Chinese Foreign Ministry to call the action a "provocation" and vowed to keep building up in the South China Sea. As per the US Navy, this was a routine "freedom of navigation" exercise. Similar exercises are performed routinely about 12–28 times per year.

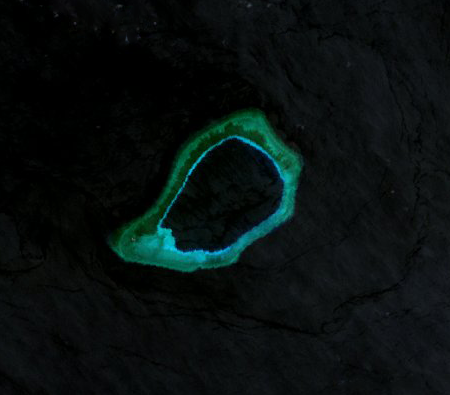
The atoll in 2000 before Chinese militarization.

During 2014, the PRC started reclaiming land at Subi Reef, and by the end of 2015 had developed it into an island of 3.95 square kilometres (1.53 sq mi), with a military base, a large harbor, and an airstrip of about 3,000 metres (9,800 ft). In November 2015, two U.S. B-52 strategic bombers flew in airspace near the area. They were contacted by Chinese ground control, but were allowed to continue their mission undeterred. In April 2016 a new lighthouse 55 metres (180 ft) high commenced operations. A civilian test flight to the new airport was conducted by a passenger jet of Hainan Airlines on July 13, 2016.

From 2023 onward, development at Subi Reef increasingly focused on surveillance, communications, and electronic-warfare capabilities rather than large-scale reclamation. Satellite imagery indicates that new fixed antenna arrays were installed during 2023–2024, with the facilities apparently associated with vehicle-deployed electronic warfare or intelligence, surveillance and reconnaissance (ISR) systems. In early 2025, two matching ISTAR radomes were completed on opposite sides of the reef. Additional supporting infrastructure, including a roofed facility for mobile EW/ISR equipment, was also constructed during 2025.

== See also ==
- Fiery Cross Reef
- Great Wall of Sand
- Mischief Reef
- Nine-dotted line
