= List of maritime features in the Spratly Islands =

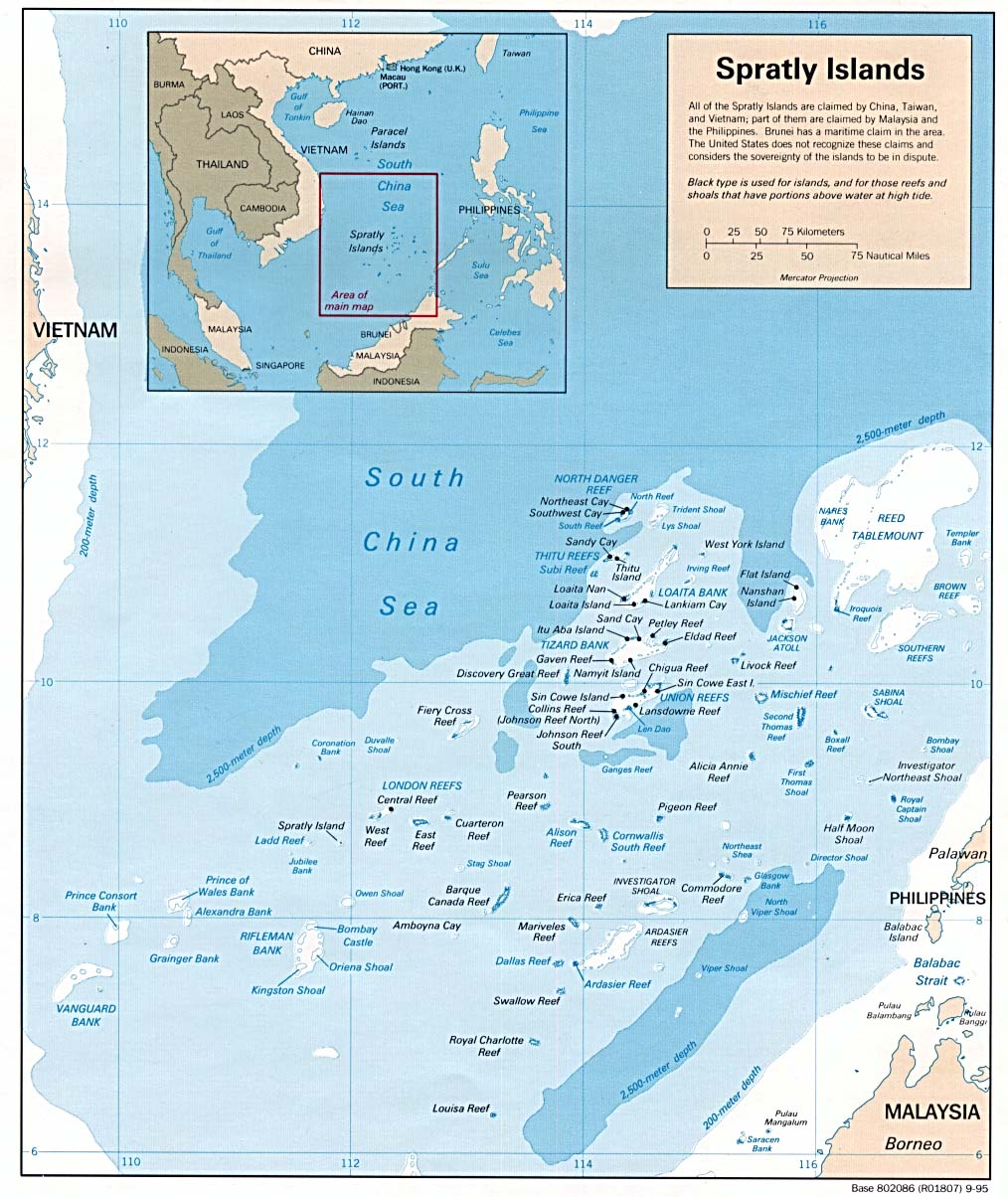
The Spratly Islands

This page features a series of lists of maritime features in the Spratly Islands.

== Features by area ==
Of the hundreds of maritime features in the Spratly Islands, relatively few have land permanently above sea-level that is larger than protruding rocks. There are only 13 islands and cays with a natural area above sea-level larger than one hectare. (Note: At one time Lankiam Cay (Panata) had an area of more than 5 hectares, but a severe typhoon and accompanying strong waves washed away the sand on the cay leaving behind the underlying coral base with an area of less than half a hectare.) With the exception of Swallow Reef, prior to 2014 there had been no large-scale land reclamation beyond building breakwaters and piers, and extending runways.

This changed dramatically in 2014 with the PRC embarking on large-scale reclamations of the lagoons of Johnson South Reef (~10ha) and Fiery Cross Reef (~230ha), and other reclamations of then unknown extent at the Gaven Reefs and Cuarteron Reef. Reports of the extent of land reclaimed on Swallow Reef vary. The PRC land reclamations have continued on a total of seven sites. In 2015, Subi Reef, Hughes Reef and Mischief Reef were added. Refer to the table below for the most recently available data. In summary, there have been reclamations of very large areas (640 acres = 1 sq mile) at three sites by the PRC, reclamations of large areas (10-100 acres) at eight sites (four by PRC, three by Vietnam, and one by Malaysia) and reclamations of lesser areas at a number of sites. There does not appear to have been any reclamation of Philippine occupied areas. There have been small Taiwanese reclamations at Itu Aba, very small but functionally significant reclamations at six Malaysian sites, and a number small but significant reclamations at Vietnamese sites in 2016, most particularly at Spratly Island where the runway has been extended and a sheltered harbour added.

The following table contains the 16 largest "natural" features, (i.e. not including reclaimed land), plus the features with significant amounts of reclaimed land:

#	Feature	in Atoll	"Natural" Area	Location	Currently occupied by	Reclaimed Area
1	Itu Aba Island	Tizard Bank	46.00 hectares (113.7 acres)	10°22.5′N 114°22′E	ROC (Taiping Island)	~8 acres (3.2 ha)
2	Thitu Island	Thitu Reefs	37.20 hectares (91.9 acres)	11°03′N 114°17′E	PHI (Pagasa Island)	
3	West York Island	West York Island	18.60 hectares (46.0 acres)	11°05′N 115°01′E	PHI (Likas Island)	
4	Spratly Island	Spratly Island	13.00 hectares (32.1 acres)	08°38′N 111°55′E	VNM (Trường Sa Island)	~37 acres (15 ha)
5	Northeast Cay	North Danger Reef	12.70 hectares (31.4 acres)	11°28′N 114°21′E	PHI (Parola Island)	
6	Southwest Cay	North Danger Reef	12.00 hectares (29.7 acres)	11°26′N 114°20′E	VNM (Song Tử Tây Island)	~7 acres (2.8 ha)
7	Sin Cowe Island	Union Banks	8.00 hectares (19.8 acres)	09°52′N 114°19′E	VNM (Sinh Tồn Island)	~26 acres (11 ha)
8	Nanshan Island	Loaita Bank	7.93 hectares (19.6 acres)	10°45′N 115°49′E	PHI (Lawak Island)	
9	Sand Cay	Tizard Bank	7.00 hectares (17.3 acres)	10°23′N 114°28′E	VNM (Sơn Ca Island)	~9 acres (3.6 ha)
10	Loaita Island	Loaita Bank	6.45 hectares (15.9 acres)	10°40′N 114°25′E	PHI (Kota Island)	
11	Swallow Reef	Swallow Reef	6.20 hectares (15.3 acres)	07°22′N 113°50′E	MYS (Layang-Layang Reef)	~95 acres (38 ha)
12	Namyit Island	Tizard Bank	5.30 hectares (13.1 acres)	10°11′N 114°22′E	VNM (Nam Yết Island)	
13	Amboyna Cay	Amboyna Cay	1.60 hectares (4.0 acres)	07°54′N 112°55′E	VNM (An Bang Island)	
	Grierson Reef	Union Banks	1.60 hectares (4.0 acres)	09°54′N 114°34′E	VNM (Sinh Tồn Đông Island)	~3 acres (1.2 ha)
	West London Reef	London Reefs	1.10 hectares (2.7 acres)	08°52′N 112°15′E	VNM (Đá Tây A Island)	~70 acres (28 ha)
	Central London Reef	London Reefs	0.88 hectares (2.2 acres)	08°56′N 112°21′E	VNM (Trường Sa Đông Island)	~4 acres (1.6 ha)
14	Flat Island	Loaita Bank	0.57 hectares (1.4 acres)	10°49′N 115°49′E	PHI (Patag Island)	
15	Loaita Cay	Loaita Bank	0.53 hectares (1.3 acres)	10°43′43″N 114°21′09″E	PHI (Panata Island)	
16	Lankiam Cay	Loaita Bank	0.44 hectares (1.1 acres)	10°43′N 114°32′E	PHI (Kota Cay)	
	Mischief Reef	Mischief Reef	0.00	09°56′N 115°32′E	PRC	~1,379 acres (558 ha)
	Subi Reef	Thitu Reefs	0.00	10°55′N 114°04′E	PRC	~976 acres (395 ha)
	Fiery Cross Reef	Fiery Cross Reef	0.00	09°36′N 111°57′E	PRC	~677 acres (274 ha)
	Cuarteron Reef	London Reefs	0.00	08°52′N 112°50′E	PRC	~56 acres (23 ha)
	Gaven Reefs	Tizard Bank	0.00	10°13′N 114°13′E	PRC	~34 acres (14 ha)
	Johnson South Reef	Union Banks	0.00	09°43′N 114°17′E	PRC	~27 acres (11 ha)
	Hughes Reef	Union Banks	0.00	09°55′N 114°30′E	PRC	~19 acres (7.7 ha)
	Pearson Reef	SW Dangerous Ground	0.00	08°58′N 113°42′E	VNM (Phan Vinh Island)	~6 acres (2.4 ha)
	Cornwallis South Reef	SW Dangerous Ground	0.00	08°43′N 114°11′E	VNM (Núi Le Reef)	~2 acres (0.81 ha)

== Features by major reef/bank, etc. ==
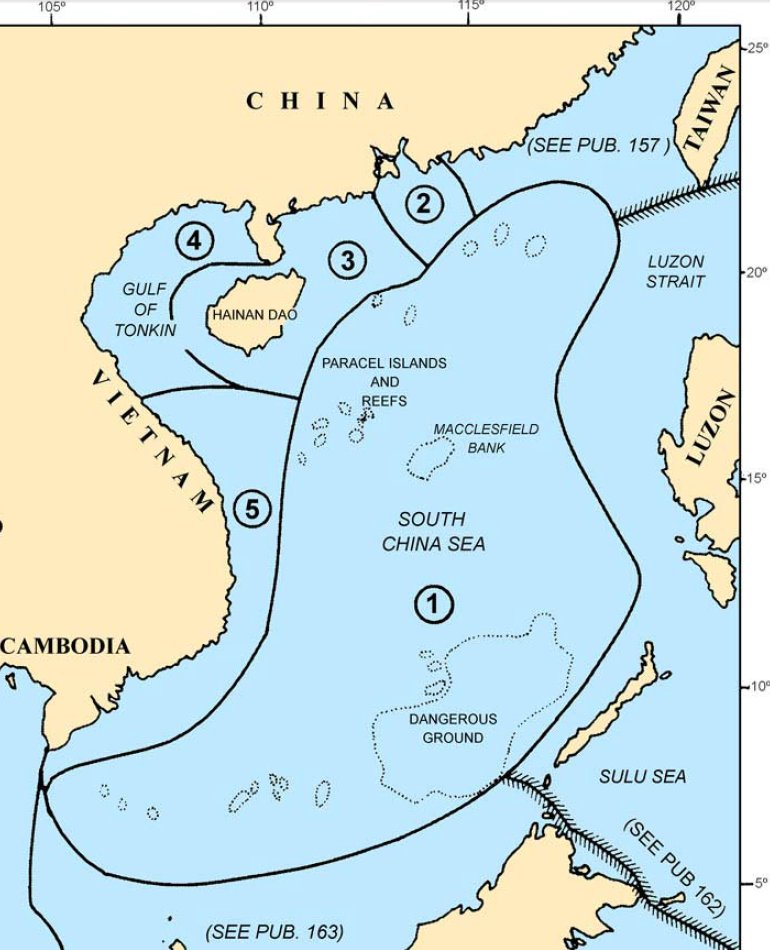
Map of the South China Sea area showing the location of Dangerous Ground

The boundaries of the Spratly Islands are not firmly defined. West to east, the islands range from the coastal waters of Vietnam to the east of Dangerous Ground and the Palawan Passage (approx. 106–117°E), and south to north from the coastal waters of Borneo and the southern South China Sea to the north of Dangerous Ground and the Reed Bank (approx. 3–12°N).

The major feature of the area is Dangerous Ground, an oblong area approximately 340 nautical miles (630 km; 390 mi) SW–NE, 175 nautical miles (324 km; 201 mi) at its widest, with an area of about 52,000 nm^{2} (178,000 km^{2}). It lies approximately between 7.5–12°N, 113–117°E; and US NGA literature^{etc.} seems to consider its centre as 10°N 115°E. The remainder of the Spratly Islands are mainly to the west and south of Dangerous Ground, with some features to the east.

The Spratly Islands can be roughly divided into seven sub-areas relative to Dangerous Ground:

Direction from Dangerous Ground	Approx. latitude and longitude	Ref.
NW	10-12°N, 113-115°E	
NE	10-12°N, 115-117°E	
SE	7-10°N, 115–117°E	
SW	7-10°N, 113–115°E	
E	3-12°N, east of 117°E	
S	3–7°N, 113-117°E	
W	3–12°N, west of 113°E	

Relative positions of sub-areas
W	NW	NE	E
W	SW	SE	E
W	S		E

(Note: Note that the sea in the area 10-12°N, west of 113°E is mostly at least 1000m deep until approaching the Vietnam coast, and hence contains no maritime features of interest. Refer to charts: 93020, 93022, 93030, and 93044. Areas south of 10°N and west of 113°E are covered by charts 93020, 93022, 93030 and 93049.)

Within these sub-areas there are a number of major reefs and banks, as well as ungrouped maritime features.

Starting in the NW, and progressing in a generally SW direction, the features include:

Sub-area	Group	Vicinity	Contains
NW	North Danger Reef	11°25′N 114°21′E	North Reef (Spratly Islands); Northeast Cay; Shira Islet; Southwest Cay; Jenkins Patches; South Reef; Sabine Patches; Farquharson Patches; Day Shoal; Iroquois Ridge
NW	Trident & Lys		Trident Shoal, Lys Shoal
NW	Thitu Reefs	11°03′N 114°17′E	Thitu Island; Thitu Reef; Sandy Cay (Spratly Islands)
NW	(Near Thitu Reefs)	10°55′N 114°04′E	Subi Reef
NW	Loaita Banks	10°45′N 114°30′E	Lankiam Cay; Loaita Cay; Loaita Nan; Loaita Island
NW	(East of Loaita Banks)	10°55′N 114°45′E	Menzies Reef , Irving Reef, West York Island
NW	Tizard Banks	10°15′N 114°30′E	Ban Than Reef/Zhongzhou Reef; Eldad Reef; Gaven Reefs; Namyit Island; Petley Reef; Sand Cay; Taiping Island/Itu Aba
NW	(West of Tizard Banks)		Western Reef, Discovery Great Reef, Discovery Small Reef
W	(West of Union Banks)	9°30′N 112°30′E	Fiery Cross Reef, Dhaulle Shoal, Coronation Bank
SW	Union Banks	09°50′N 114°30′E	Collins Reef/Johnson North Reef, Edmund Reef, Grierson Reef/Sin Cowe East Island, Hallet Reef, Higgens Reef, Holiday Reef, Hughes Reef, Johnson South Reef, Jones Reef/Zhangxi Jiao, Lansdowne Reef, McKennan Reef/Kennan Reef, Sin Cowe Island, Whitson Reef, Empire Reef, Loveless Reef
NE	Reed Tablemount	11°20′N 116°50′E	Reed Bank, Nares Bank, Marie Louise Bank, Pennsylvania North Reef, Iroquois Reef
NE	NE Dangerous Ground	11°N 116°E	Jackson Atoll, Nanshan Island, Flat Island, Third Thomas Shoal, Hopkins Reef, Amy Douglas Bank/Hirane Shoal, Hardy Reef/Hubo Reef, Sandy Shoal, Lord Auckland Shoal, Carnatic Shoal, Seahorse Shoal/Seashore Shoal/Routh Shoal, Iroquois Reef, Leslie Bank, Templar Bank, Southern Bank (Spratly Islands), Southern Banks, Tagpi, Pennsylvania South Reef/Magat Salamat Reef,
NE	Southampton Reefs		Hopps Reef ; Livock Reef
E	(East & SE Dangerous Ground)		Bombay Shoal, Royal Captain Shoal, Half Moon Shoal, South Viper Shoal
SE	SE Dangerous Ground	9°N 116°E	Sabina Shoal, Boxall Reef, Second Thomas Shoal, Mischief Reef, First Thomas Shoal, Alicia Annie Reef, Commodore Reef, North Viper Shoal, North East Shoal, Director Reef, Glasgow Bank, Investigator Northeast Shoal
SW	SW Dangerous Ground	9°N 114°E	Maralie Reef/Bittern Reef, Alison Reef, Cornwallis South Reef, Pearson Reef, Pigeon Reef, Investigator Shoal, Ardasier Reef, Ardasier Bank, Erica Reef, Mariveles Reef, Dallas Reef, Barque Canada Reef, Royal Charlotte Reef
W	London Reefs	08°50′N 112°30′E	Central London Reef; Cuarteron Reef; East London Reef; West London Reef
W	(Spratly Island vicinity)	08°40′N 111°45′E	Spratly Island, Ladd Reef, Jubilee Bank (Spratly Islands)
W	(West of Spratly Island)		Scawfell Shoal, Charlotte Bank, Vanguard Bank, Julia Shoal, Royal Bishop Shoal
W	(Southwest of Spratly Island)		Alexandra Bank; Grainger Bank; Prince of Wales Bank; Prince Consort Bank
W	Rifleman Bank	07°50′N 111°40′E	Bombay Castle (bãi Ba Kè); Johnson Patch (tức là Bãi Vũng Mây); Kingston Shoal (Bãi Đinh); Orleana Shoal (Bãi Đất), Bãi Ráng Chiều, bãi Ngũ Sắc, bãi Xà Cừ, bãi Vũ Tích
S			Amboyna Cay; Swallow Reef; Louisa Reef
S	Luconia Shoals	05°30′N 112°30′E	North Luconia Shoals: Friendship Shoal, Hardie Reef, Aitken Reef, Buck Reef, Moody Reef, Seahorse Breakers, Tripp Reef, Hayes Reef South Luconia Shoals: Stigant Reef, Connell Reef, Herald Reef (Spratly Islands), Comus Shoal, Richmond Reef, Luconia Breakers

== Features by name ==
A

- Amboyna Cay
- Ardasier Reef
- Ayungin Reef / shoal (Second Thomas)

B

- Balagtas Reef (Irving Reef)
- Ban Than Reef (Zhongzhou Reef)
- Boji Jiao (Erica Reef)
- Bombay Castle

C

- Calderon Reef (Cuarteron Reef)
- Celerio Reef (Swallow Reef)
- Central London Reef
- Chigua Reef (Johnson South Reef)
- Collins Reef (Johnson North Reef)
- Cuarteron Reef (Calderon Reef)

D

- Dallas Reef
- Dangerous Ground
- Dongmen Reef (Hughes Reef)

E

- East London Reef
- Enola Reef (Erica Reef)
- Erica Reef (Boji Jiao,Enola Reef, Gabriela Silang Reef, Terumbu Siput)

F

- Fiery Cross Reef
- Flat Island (Patag Island)
- First Thomas Shoal

G

- Gabriela Silang Reef (Erica Reef)
- Gaven Reefs / Gaven North Reef / Gaven South Reef

H

- Half Moon Shoal
- Hardy Reef (Hubo Reef)
- Hubo Reef (Hardy Reef)
- Hughes Reef (Dongmen Reef)

I

- Investigator Shoal (Pawikan Reef)
- Irving Reef (Balagtas Reef)
- Itu Aba (Ligao Island, Taiping Island)

J

- James Shoal
- Johnson Reef:
  - Johnson North Reef (Collins)
  - Johnson South Reef (Chigua)

K

- Kota Island (Loaita)

L

- Ladd Reef
- Loaita Cay (Panata Island)
- Lawak Island (Nanshan Island)
- Layang Layang / Layang Layang Island (Swallow)
- Ligao Island (Itu Aba, Taiping Island)
- Likas Island (West York Island)
- Lankiam Cay / Loaita Nan / Loaita Island (Kota)
- London Reefs
- Louisa Reef
- Luconia Shoals

M

- Magat Salamat Reef (Pennsylvania South Reef)
- Mariveles Reef
- Menzies Reef
- Mischief Reef (Panganiban Reef)
- Republic of Morac-Songhrati-Meads

N

- Namyit Island
- Nanshan Island (Lawak Island)
- North Danger Reef
- Northeast Cay (Parola Island)

P

- Pagasa Island (Thitu Island)
- Panata Island (Lankiam Cay)
- Panganiban Reef (Mischief Reef)
- Parola Island (Northeast Cay)
- Patag Island (Flat Island)
- Pawikan Reef (Investigator Shoal)
- Pennsylvania South Reef (Magat Salamat Reef)
- Pugad Island (Southwest Cay)

R

- Recto Bank / Reed Bank / Reed Tablemount

S

- Sabina Shoal
- Sand Cay
- Second Thomas Reef / Second Thomas Shoal (Ayungin)
- Sin Cowe Island
- Southwest Cay (Pugad Island)
- Spratly Island / Storm Island
- Subi Reef
- Swallow Reef (Celerio, Layang Layang)

T

- Taiping Island (Itu Aba, Ligao Island)
- Terumbu Siput (Erica Reef)
- Thitu Island (Pagasa Island)
- Third Thomas Shoal

U

- Union banks

W

- West London Reef
- West York Island (Likas Island)
- Western Reef
- Whitsun Reef

Z

- Zhongzhou Reef (Ban Than Reef)

== Features by occupier and/or claimant ==
The Spratly Islands, showing occupancy.

A feature is occupied by a country if one of the following is true:

- Soldiers and/or civilian citizens of a country are present in the feature, either by building structures over the feature to house the citizens (most features are of this type) or by manning a ship anchored over the feature (Philippine-occupied Irving Reef is of this type).
- Regularly visited by soldiers of a country, not necessarily having soldiers present in it 24 hours. These features must lie near (within 9 miles (14 km)) a feature occupied by the country in the way of the first condition. Presence of structures is not necessary. This is the case of Philippine-occupied Flat Island and Lankiam Cay where soldiers stationed at Nanshan Island and Loaita Island respectively, regularly visit on a daily basis.

The effective visible distance of horizon from a 15-meter (typical large structure) height above sea-level is 9 miles (14 km). This makes features occupied by the second condition to be also labeled as "occupied" since they can be guarded far away. However, not all features within the 9-mile (14 km) radius can be considered as absolutely occupied. This is especially true for features that lie between and within 9 miles (14 km) of two or more features occupied by different countries. (See Virtually Occupied or Controlled table)

=== Summary ===
Int'l Name	Co-ords	Sub-group	Occupant/s	Since	Notes
Itu Aba	10°22.5′N 114°22′E	Tizard Bank	ROC (Taiwan)	1946	
Ban Than Reef	10°23′N 114°24′E	Tizard Bank	ROC (Taiwan)	1946	
Cuarteron Reef	08°53′N 112°51′E	London Reefs	PRC (China)	1988	
Fiery Cross Reef	09°37′N 112°58′E	W of Union Banks	PRC (China)	1988	Military Garrison
Gaven Reefs	10°13′N 114°13′E	Tizard Bank	PRC (China)	1988	
Hughes Reef	09°55′N 114°30′E	Union Banks	PRC (China)	1988	Lighthouse
Johnson South Reef	09°43′N 114°17′E	Union Banks	PRC (China)	1988	
Mischief Reef	09°55′N 115°32′E	SE Dangerous Ground	PRC (China)	1995	Airfield
Subi Reef	10°55′N 114°04′E	W of Thitu Reefs	PRC (China)	2013	Military Garrison
Flat Island	10°49′N 115°49′E	SE Dangerous Ground	PHI	1974	Lighthouse
Lankiam Cay	10°43′N 114°32′E	Loaita Banks	PHI	1978	
Loaita Cay	10°43′43″N 114°21′09″E	Loaita Banks	PHI	1978	
Loaita Island	10°40′N 114°25′E	Loaita Banks	PHI	1978	Military barracks
Nanshan Island	10°44′N 115°48′E	NE Dangerous Ground	PHI	1974	Barracks & Helipad
Northeast Cay	11°27′N 114°21′E	North Danger Reef	PHI	1968	Lighthouse
Thitu Island	11°03′N 114°17′E	Thitu Reefs	PHI	1971	Airfield
West York Island	11°05′N 115°01′E	NW Dangerous Ground	PHI	1974	Lighthouse
Commodore Reef	08°22′N 115°12′E	SE Dangerous Ground	PHI	1978	
Irving Reef	10°52′N 114°55′E	NNW Dangerous Ground	PHI	1970-1980	
Second Thomas Shoal	09°44′N 115°52′E	NE Dangerous Ground	PHI	1999	Navy Outpost
Southwest Cay	11°26′N 114°20′E	North Danger Reef	VNM	1975/04/14	Lighthouse
Sand Cay	10°23′N 114°29′E	Tizard Bank	VNM	1975/04/25	Lighthouse
Namyit Island	10°11′N 114°22′E	Tizard Bank	VNM	1975/04/27	Lighthouse
Sin Cowe Island	09°53′N 114°20′E	Union Banks	VNM	1975/04/27	Lighthouse
Spratly Island	08°38′N 114°25′E	Spratly Island vicinity	VNM	1975/04/29	Lighthouse
Amboyna Cay	07°54′N 112°55′E		VNM	1975/04/29	Lighthouse
Grierson Reef /Sin Cowe East Island	09°54′N 114°34′E	Union Banks	VNM	1978/03/23	
Central London Reef	08°56′N 112°21′E	London Reefs	VNM	1978/04/02	
Pearson Reef	08°57′N 113°40′E	SW Dangerous Ground	VNM	1978/04/10	
Barque Canada Reef	08°10′N 113°18′E	NE Dangerous Ground	VNM	1987/02	
West London Reef	08°52′N 112°14′E	London Reefs	VNM	1988/01/15	Lighthouse
Ladd Reef	08°41′N 111°40′E	Spratly Island vicinity	VNM	1988/02/05	Lighthouse
Discovery Great Reef	10°04′N 113°51′E	W of Tizard Banks	VNM	1988/02/06	
Pigeon Reef	08°51′N 114°39′E	SW Dangerous Ground	VNM	1988/02/07	Lighthouse
East London Reef	08°50′N 112°36′E	London Reefs	VNM	1988/02/19	
Alison Reef	08°51′N 114°00′E	SW Dangerous Ground	VNM	1988/03/20	
Cornwallis South Reef	08°43′N 114°11′E	SW Dangerous Ground	VNM	1988/03/20	
South Reef	11°23′N 114°18′E	North Danger Reef	VNM	1988/04/02	
Petley Reef	10°24′N 114°35′E	Tizard Bank	VNM	1988/04/13	
Collins Reef	09°46′N 114°15′E	Union Banks	VNM	1988/06/28	
Lansdowne Reef	09°47′N 114°22′E	Union Banks	VNM	1988/06/28	
Bombay Castle	07°56′N 111°43′E	Riflemen Bank	VNM	1989/06/30	Lighthouse
Prince of Wales Bank	08°09′N 110°36′E	Southwest Bank	VNM	1989/06/30	Lighthouse
Vanguard Bank	07°32′N 109°45′E	West Spratlys	VNM	1989/07/05	Lighthouse, China Coast Guard regular patrol
Prince Consort Bank	07°55′N 109°58′E	Southwest Bank	VNM	1990/11/04	Lighthouse
Grainger Bank	07°49′N 110°30′E	Southwest Bank	VNM	1991/11/03	Lighthouse
Alexandra Bank	08°01′N 110°38′E	Southwest Bank	VNM	1991/11/30	Lighthouse
Orleana Shoal	07°41′N 111°43′E	Riflemen Bank	VNM	1998/07/03	Lighthouse
Kingston Shoal	07°34′6″N 111°33′13″E	Riflemen Bank	VNM	1998/07/07	Lighthouse
Swallow Reef	07°22′N 113°50′E		MYS	1983	RMN offshore EEZ station "Lima"
Ardasier Reef	07°38′N 113°56′E	SW Dangerous Ground	MYS	1986	RMN offshore EEZ station "Uniform"
Mariveles Reef	08°00′N 113°54′E	SW Dangerous Ground	MYS	1986	RMN offshore EEZ station "Mike"
Dallas Reef	07°37′N 113°48′E	SW Dangerous Ground	MYS	1987 (or 1986)	
Erica Reef	08°06′N 114°08′E	SW Dangerous Ground	MYS	1999	RMN offshore EEZ station "Sierra"
Investigator Shoal	08°07′N 114°42′E	SW Dangerous Ground	MYS	1999	RMN offshore EEZ station "Papa"
James Shoal	03°58.5′N 112°21′E	-	MYS		China Coast Guard regular patrol
Louisa Reef	06°20′N 113°14′E		BRU	-	
Aitken Reef	5°54′0″N 112°31′30″E	Luconia Shoals			Unoccupied, near (Malaysia)
Alicia Annie Reef	9°21′N 115°26′E	SW Dangerous Ground			
Amy Douglas Bank /Hirane Shoal	10°50′N 116°15′E	NE Dangerous Ground			Unoccupied, the east of the 116°E meridian
Ardasier Bank	7°36′N 114°17′E	SW Dangerous Ground			Unoccupied, near (Malaysia)
Bombay Shoal	9°26′N 116°55′E	ESE Dangerous Ground			Unoccupied, the east of the 116°E meridian
Boxall Reef	9°36′N 116°10′E	SE Dangerous Ground			Unoccupied, the east of the 116°E meridian
Buck Reef	5°48′15″N 112°32′15″E	Luconia Shoals			Unoccupied, near (Malaysia)
Carnatic Shoal	10°06′N 117°21′E	NE Dangerous Ground			Unoccupied, the east of the 116°E meridian
Comus Shoal	5°2′12″N 112°56′20″E	Luconia Shoals			Unoccupied, near (Malaysia)
Connell Reef	5°4′40″N 112°34′45″E	Luconia Shoals			Unoccupied, near (Malaysia)
Coronation Bank	9°21′N 111°44′E	W of Union Banks			
Deane Reef	10°30′4.1″N 115°42′27.5″E	Jackson Atoll			
Dhaulle Shoal	9°28′N 112°24′E	W of Union Banks			
Dickinson Reef	10°32′10.3″N 115°47′22.1″E	Jackson Atoll			
Director Reef	8°28′N 115°55′E	SE Dangerous Ground			
Discovery Small Reef	10°01′N 114°02′E	W of Tizard Banks			
Edmund Reef	9°54′N 114°23.5′E	Union Banks			
Eldad Reef	10°21′N 114°42′E	Tizard Bank			Unoccupied, China Coast Guard regular patrol
Empire Reef	9°58.5′N 114°35.5′E	Union Banks			
First Thomas Shoal	09°20′N 115°57′E	SE Dangerous Ground			Unoccupied, China Coast Guard regular patrol
Friendship Shoal	5°57′18″N 112°31′43″E	Luconia Shoals			Unoccupied, near (Malaysia)
Ganges Reef	10°20′N 115°04′E	-			
Glasgow Bank	8°28′N 115°30′E	SE Dangerous Ground			
Half Moon Shoal	8°52′N 116°16′E	ESE Dangerous Ground			Unoccupied, the east of the 116°E meridian
Hallet Reef	9°56′N 114°31′E	Union Banks			Unoccupied, near (China) Hughes Reef
Hampson Reef	10°27′50.1″N 115°43′31.7″E	Jackson Atoll			
Hardie Reef	5°47′0″N 112°26′45″E	Luconia Shoals			Unoccupied, near (Malaysia)
Hardy Reef/Hubo Reef	10°08′N 116°08′E	NE Dangerous Ground			Unoccupied, the east of the 116°E meridian
Hayes Reef	5°22′N 112°39′E	Luconia Shoals			Unoccupied, near (Malaysia)
Herald Reef (Spratly Islands)	4°58′15″N 112°36′15″E	Luconia Shoals			Unoccupied, near (Malaysia)
Higgens Reef	09°48′N 114°24′E	Union Banks			
Hoare Reef	10°32′5.1″N 115°43′52″E	Jackson Atoll			
Holiday Reef	9°58′N 114°34′E	Union Banks			
Hopkins Reef	10°48.5′N 116°05.5′E	NE Dangerous Ground			Unoccupied, the east of the 116°E meridian
Hopps Reef	10°15′N 115°21.5′E	Southampton Reefs			
Investigator Northeast Shoal	9°10.5′N 116°27.5′E	SE Dangerous Ground			Unoccupied, the east of the 116°E meridian
Iroquois Reef	10°37.5′N 116°10.5′E	NE Dangerous Ground			Unoccupied, the east of the 116°E meridian
Jackson Atoll	10°29′N 115°45′E	NE Dangerous Ground			
Johnson Patch	07°48′15″N 111°34′29″E	Union Banks	Riflemen Bank		Unoccupied, near (Vietnam) Bombay Castle
Jones Reef/Zhangxi Jiao	9°50′N 114°28′E	Union Banks			
Jubilee Bank (Spratly Islands)	8°32′N 111°29′E	Spratly Island vicinity			Unoccupied, near (Vietnam) Ladd Reef
Katimugan Banks	10°30′N 116°40′E	NE Dangerous Ground-			Unoccupied, the east of the 116°E meridian
Leslie Bank	11°05′N 117°28′E	NE Dangerous Ground-			Unoccupied, the east of the 116°E meridian
Livock Reef	10°11′N 115°18′E	Southampton Reefs			
Loaita Nan	10°42′N 114°19′E	Loaita Banks			Unoccupied, near (Philippines) Loaita Cay
Lord Auckland Shoal	10°20′N 117°17′E	NE Dangerous Ground			Unoccupied, the east of the 116°E meridian
Loveless Reef	9°51′N 114°17′E	Union Banks			Unoccupied, near (Vietnam) Sin Cowe Island
Luconia Breakers	4°59′N 112°37′E	Luconia Shoals			Unoccupied, near (Malaysia) , China Coast Guard regular patrol
Lys Shoal	11°19′N 114°35′E	Trident & Lys			
Maralie Reef /Bittern Reef	9°12′N 113°40′E	SW Dangerous Ground			
Marie Louise Bank	11°55′N 116°47′E	Reed Tablemount			Unoccupied, the east of the 116°E meridian
McKennan Reef /Kennan Reef	9°54′N 114°28′E	Union Banks			Unoccupied, near (China) Hughes Reef
Menzies Reef	11°09′N 114°48′E	NNW Dangerous Ground			
Moody Reef	5°37′38″N 112°21′38″E	Luconia Shoals			Unoccupied, near (Malaysia)
Nares Bank	11°35′N 116°15′E	Reed Tablemount			Unoccupied, the east of the 116°E meridian
North East Shoal	8°31′N 115°15′E	SE Dangerous Ground			
North Luconia Shoals	5°39′N 112°28′E	Luconia Shoals			Unoccupied, near (Malaysia)
South Luconia Shoals	5°05′N 112°40′E	Luconia Shoals			Unoccupied, near (Malaysia)
North Reef (Spratly Islands)	11°28′N 114°23′E	North Danger Reef			Unoccupied, near (Philippines) Northeast Cay
North Viper Shoal	8°02′N 115°23′E	SE Dangerous Ground			
South Viper Shoal	7°30′N 115°00′E	ESE Dangerous Ground			
Owen Shoal	8°9′N 111°58′E	-			Unoccupied, near (Vietnam) Bombay Castle
Pennsylvania North Reef	10°48′N 116°51′E	Reed Tablemount			Unoccupied, the east of the 116°E meridian
Pennsylvania South Reef /Magat Salamat Reef	10°23′N 116°34′E	NE Dangerous Ground-			Unoccupied, the east of the 116°E meridian
Petch Reef	10°27′39.9″N 115°46′48.4″E	Jackson Atoll			
Reed Bank	11°20′N 116°50′E	Reed Tablemount			Unoccupied, the east of the 116°E meridian
Richmond Reef	5°3′0″N 112°39′52″E	Luconia Shoals			Unoccupied, near (Malaysia)
Royal Captain Shoal	9°01′N 116°40′E	ESE Dangerous Ground			Unoccupied, the east of the 116°E meridian
Royal Charlotte Reef	6°57′N 113°35′E	SW Dangerous Ground			Unoccupied, near (Malaysia) , China Coast Guard regular patrol
Sabina Shoal	9°45′N 116°28′E	SE Dangerous Ground			Unoccupied, the east of the 116°E meridian
Sandy Cay (Spratly Islands)	11°04′N 114°13′E	Thitu Reefs			Unoccupied, near (Philippines) Thitu Island
Sandy Shoal	11°02′N 117°38′E	NE Dangerous Ground-			Unoccupied, the east of the 116°E meridian
Seahorse Breakers	5°30′N 112°35′E	Luconia Shoals			Unoccupied, near (Malaysia)
Seahorse Shoal	10°48′N 117°47′E	NE Dangerous Ground-			Unoccupied, the east of the 116°E meridian
Southern Bank (Spratly Islands)	10°28′N 116°45′E	NE Dangerous Ground-			Unoccupied, the east of the 116°E meridian
Stag Shoal	8°27′N 112°57′E	-			
Stigant Reef	5°1′28″N 112°28′45″E	Luconia Shoals			Unoccupied, near (Malaysia)
Tagpi	10°33′N 116°56′E	NE Dangerous Ground-			Unoccupied, the east of the 116°E meridian
Templar Bank	11°01′N 117°17′E	NE Dangerous Ground-			Unoccupied, the east of the 116°E meridian
Third Thomas Shoal	10°54′N 115°56′E	NE Dangerous Ground			
Thitu Reef	11°05′N 114°23′E	Thitu Reefs			Unoccupied, near (Philippines) Thitu Island
Trident Shoal	11°24′N 114°40′E	Trident & Lys			
Tripp Reef	5°28′30″N 112°28′30″E	Luconia Shoals			Unoccupied, near (Malaysia)
Western Reef	10°14′N 113°38.33′E	W of Tizard Banks			
Whitson Reef	09°59′N 114°39′E	Union Banks			Unoccupied, China Coast Guard regular patrol

=== Occupied features ===
Location of the major islands in Spratly Islands. The eastern Dangerous Ground area contains many other reefs.
- Legend:
- Republic of China (Taiwan): 1: Taiping 2: Zhongzhou
- China: 3: Yongshu 4: Meiji 5: Zhubi 6: Huayang 7: Nanxun 8: Chiguo 9: Dongmen
- Philippines: 10: Flat Island 11: Lankiam Cay 12: Loaita Cay 13: Loaita Island 14: Nanshan Island 15: Northeast Cay 16: Thitu Island 17: West York Island 18: Commodore Reef 19: Irving Reef 20: Second Thomas Shoal
- Vietnam: 21: Southwest Cay 22: Sand Cay 23: Namyit Island 24: Sin Cowe Island 25: Spratly Island 26: Amboyna Cay 27: Grierson Reef 28: Central London Reef 29: Pearson Reef 30: Barque Canada Reef 31: West London Reef 32: Ladd Reef 33: Discovery Great Reef 34: Pigeon Reef 35: East London Reef 36: Alison Reef 37: Cornwallis South Reef 38: Petley Reef 39: South Reef 40: Collins Reef 41: Lansdowne Reef 42: Bombay Castle 43: Prince of Wales Bank 44: Vanguard Bank 45: Prince Consort Bank 46: Grainger Bank 47: Alexandra Bank 48: Orleana Shoal 49: Kingston Shoal
- Malaysia: 50: Swallow Reef 51: Ardasier Reef 52: Dallas Reef 53: Erica Reef 54: Investigator Shoal 55: Mariveles Reef
- Brunei: 56: Louisa Reef

==== Brunei Darussalam ====
Note that Louisa Reef was controlled by Brunei since 2009.

Brunei
Int'l Name	Local Names	Description	Area (ha.)	Reclaimed area
Louisa Reef	(China) 南通礁 (Taiwan) 南通礁; Nantong Jiao	Rocks 1 m high. Malaysia operates a lighthouse here.	0	
Louisa Reef	(Malaysia) Terumbu Semarang / Barat Kecil	Rocks 1 m high. Malaysia operates a lighthouse here.	0	
Total		1 reef	0	

==== Malaysia ====
Note that the Royal Malaysian Navy have established 5 Offshore naval stations (Offshore EEZ Stations) on reclaimed land:

1. 1983: Station Lima (Swallow Reef)
2. 1986: Station Uniform (Ardasier Reef)
3. 1986: Station Mike (Mariveles Reef)
4. 1999: Station Sierra (Erica Reef)
5. 1999: Station Papa (Investigator Shoal)

Malaysia
Int'l Name	Local Names	Description	Area (ha.)	Reclaimed area
Swallow Reef/ Island	(Philippines) Celerio	The eleventh largest Spratly island. Treeless cay and rocks up to 3 m high surround a lagoon. Malaysia has drawn territorial seas around this and Amboyna Cay. Some 70 plus soldiers stationed at Royal Malaysian Navy offshore EEZ station "Lima". Has a 1.4 km airstrip, jetty and dive resort. Occupied since 1983.	6.2	~35ha
Swallow Reef/ Island	(China) 弹丸礁 (Taiwan) 彈丸礁; Danwan Jiao	The eleventh largest Spratly island. Treeless cay and rocks up to 3 m high surround a lagoon. Malaysia has drawn territorial seas around this and Amboyna Cay. Some 70 plus soldiers stationed at Royal Malaysian Navy offshore EEZ station "Lima". Has a 1.4 km airstrip, jetty and dive resort. Occupied since 1983.	6.2	~35ha
Swallow Reef/ Island	(Vietnam) Đá Hoa Lau	The eleventh largest Spratly island. Treeless cay and rocks up to 3 m high surround a lagoon. Malaysia has drawn territorial seas around this and Amboyna Cay. Some 70 plus soldiers stationed at Royal Malaysian Navy offshore EEZ station "Lima". Has a 1.4 km airstrip, jetty and dive resort. Occupied since 1983.	6.2	~35ha
Swallow Reef/ Island	(Malaysia) Terumbu Layang Layang	The eleventh largest Spratly island. Treeless cay and rocks up to 3 m high surround a lagoon. Malaysia has drawn territorial seas around this and Amboyna Cay. Some 70 plus soldiers stationed at Royal Malaysian Navy offshore EEZ station "Lima". Has a 1.4 km airstrip, jetty and dive resort. Occupied since 1983.	6.2	~35ha
Ardasier Reef	(Philippines) Antonio Luna	07°38′N 113°56′E; Naturally above water only at low tide. Encloses a lagoon. Has a few sandy patches. Several soldiers stationed at Royal Malaysian Navy offshore EEZ station "Uniform". Occupied since 1986.	0	
Ardasier Reef	(China) 光星仔礁 (Taiwan) 光星仔礁; Guangxingzai Jiao	07°38′N 113°56′E; Naturally above water only at low tide. Encloses a lagoon. Has a few sandy patches. Several soldiers stationed at Royal Malaysian Navy offshore EEZ station "Uniform". Occupied since 1986.	0	
Ardasier Reef	(Vietnam) Bãi Kiêu Ngựa	07°38′N 113°56′E; Naturally above water only at low tide. Encloses a lagoon. Has a few sandy patches. Several soldiers stationed at Royal Malaysian Navy offshore EEZ station "Uniform". Occupied since 1986.	0	
Ardasier Reef	(Malaysia) Terumbu Ubi	07°38′N 113°56′E; Naturally above water only at low tide. Encloses a lagoon. Has a few sandy patches. Several soldiers stationed at Royal Malaysian Navy offshore EEZ station "Uniform". Occupied since 1986.	0	
Dallas Reef	(Philippines) Rajah Matanda	Naturally above water only at low tide. Encloses a lagoon. Several soldiers stationed. Malaysia is also using this reef for tourism.	0	
Dallas Reef	(China) 光星礁 Guangxing Jiao	Naturally above water only at low tide. Encloses a lagoon. Several soldiers stationed. Malaysia is also using this reef for tourism.	0	
Dallas Reef	(Vietnam) Đá Suối Cát	Naturally above water only at low tide. Encloses a lagoon. Several soldiers stationed. Malaysia is also using this reef for tourism.	0	
Dallas Reef	(Malaysia) Terumbu Laya	Naturally above water only at low tide. Encloses a lagoon. Several soldiers stationed. Malaysia is also using this reef for tourism.	0	
Erica Reef / Enloa Reef (Note: Erica Reef and Investigator shoal were occupied by Malaysia in 1999. A web search can confirm the occupation of these two features.)	(Philippines) Gabriela Silang	Above water only at low tide. Some isolated rocks on the eastern edge stand above high water. Several soldiers stationed at Royal Malaysian Navy offshore EEZ station "Sierra". Occupied since 1999.	0	
Erica Reef / Enloa Reef	(China) 簸箕礁 (Taiwan) 簸箕礁; Boji Jiao	Above water only at low tide. Some isolated rocks on the eastern edge stand above high water. Several soldiers stationed at Royal Malaysian Navy offshore EEZ station "Sierra". Occupied since 1999.	0	
Erica Reef / Enloa Reef	(Vietnam) Đá Én Ca	Above water only at low tide. Some isolated rocks on the eastern edge stand above high water. Several soldiers stationed at Royal Malaysian Navy offshore EEZ station "Sierra". Occupied since 1999.	0	
Erica Reef / Enloa Reef	(Malaysia) Terumbu Siput	Above water only at low tide. Some isolated rocks on the eastern edge stand above high water. Several soldiers stationed at Royal Malaysian Navy offshore EEZ station "Sierra". Occupied since 1999.	0	
Investigator Shoal	(Philippines) Pawikan	Above water only at low tide. Some large rocks at the western end are visible at high water. Encloses a lagoon. Several soldiers stationed at Royal Malaysian Navy offshore EEZ station "Papa". Occupied since 1999.	0	
Investigator Shoal	(China) 榆亚暗沙 (Taiwan) 榆亞暗沙; Yuya Ansha	Above water only at low tide. Some large rocks at the western end are visible at high water. Encloses a lagoon. Several soldiers stationed at Royal Malaysian Navy offshore EEZ station "Papa". Occupied since 1999.	0	
Investigator Shoal	(Vietnam) Bãi Thám Hiểm	Above water only at low tide. Some large rocks at the western end are visible at high water. Encloses a lagoon. Several soldiers stationed at Royal Malaysian Navy offshore EEZ station "Papa". Occupied since 1999.	0	
Investigator Shoal	(Malaysia) Terumbu Peninjau	Above water only at low tide. Some large rocks at the western end are visible at high water. Encloses a lagoon. Several soldiers stationed at Royal Malaysian Navy offshore EEZ station "Papa". Occupied since 1999.	0	
Mariveles Reef	(Philippines) Mariveles	A sand cay, 1.5–2 m high, surrounded by two lagoons, parts of which are above water at high tide. Several soldiers stationed at Royal Malaysian Navy offshore EEZ station "Mike". Occupied since 1986.	0	
Mariveles Reef	(China) 南海礁 (Taiwan) 南海礁; Nanhai Jiao	A sand cay, 1.5–2 m high, surrounded by two lagoons, parts of which are above water at high tide. Several soldiers stationed at Royal Malaysian Navy offshore EEZ station "Mike". Occupied since 1986.	0	
Mariveles Reef	(Vietnam) Đá Kỳ Vân	A sand cay, 1.5–2 m high, surrounded by two lagoons, parts of which are above water at high tide. Several soldiers stationed at Royal Malaysian Navy offshore EEZ station "Mike". Occupied since 1986.	0	
Mariveles Reef	(Malaysia) Terumbu Mantanani	A sand cay, 1.5–2 m high, surrounded by two lagoons, parts of which are above water at high tide. Several soldiers stationed at Royal Malaysian Navy offshore EEZ station "Mike". Occupied since 1986.	0	
Total		1 island, 4 reefs, and 1 shoal	6.2	

==== People's Republic of China ====
People's Republic of China
Int'l Name	Local Names	Description	Area (ha.)	Reclaimed area
Cuarteron Reef	(China) 华阳礁 Huayang Jiao	8°53′00″N 112°51′05″E - Part of London Reefs. Natural features Coral rocks only. Highest are 1.5 m high, on the north. Occupation before land reclamation Occupied by PRC since 1988. As of 2011, has permanent reef fortresses and supply platforms able to resist winds up to 71 knots and equipped with VHF / UHF communications equipment, search radars as well as naval guns and anti-aircraft guns, which can serve as docks for Chinese navy patrol boats. Land reclamation Intelligence reports of November 2014 suggest the reef has been transformed into an island of yet unknown size, due to PRC's land reclamation activities. By June 2015, the land reclamation had reached 0.231 km2 and appeared complete.	0	23.1 ha
Cuarteron Reef	(Philippines) Calderon		0	23.1 ha
Cuarteron Reef	(Vietnam) Đá Châu Viên		0	23.1 ha
Fiery Cross Reef / Northwest Investigator Reef	(China) 永暑礁 Yongshu Jiao	9°37′N 112°58′E - West of Union Banks Natural features Rocks up to 1 m high. [5] says all below high tide, but guano deposits disagree. Occupation before land reclamation Occupied by PRC since 1988. "Marine observation station" built by PRC in 1988; PRC built a navy harbor by blasting, piling up and cementing coral; coconut, fir, and banyan trees planted. As of 2011, designated the PRC main command headquarters; equipped with satellite data transmission, surface and air search radars; armed with at least four high-powered naval guns and several gun emplacements. Land reclamation Intelligence reports of November 2014 observed that the reef has been transformed into an island 3,000m long and 200-300m wide due to PRC land reclamation activities. In February 2015, land reclamation was already estimated having reached 2.3 km^{2}, turning the reef to the largest landmass in Spratly islands. The reclaimed area was estimated to have grown to 2.65 km2 in April 2015. By June 2015, the land reclamation had reached 2.74 km2 and appeared complete.	0	274 ha
Fiery Cross Reef / Northwest Investigator Reef	(Philippines) Kagitingan		0	274 ha
Fiery Cross Reef / Northwest Investigator Reef	(Vietnam) Đá Chữ Thập		0	274 ha
Gaven Reefs	(China) 南薰礁 Nanxun Jiao (Northern reef) / Xinan or Duolu Jiao (Southern reef)	10°12′48″N 114°13′9″E - Part of Tizard Banks. Natural features A sand dune, 2 m high. Has fringing reef plus a reef 2 miles (3 km) to the south, both covered at high tide. Occupation before land reclamation Southern reef was occupied by PRC on 7/4/92. Occupied since 1988. As of 2011, has permanent reef fortresses and supply platforms able to resist winds up to 71 knots and equipped with VHF / UHF communications equipment, search radars as well as naval guns and anti-aircraft guns, which can serve as docks for Chinese navy patrol boats. Land reclamation Intelligence reports of November 2014 observed that the reef has been transformed into an island of yet unknown size due to PRC land reclamation activities. By June 2015, the land reclamation had reached 0.136 km2 and appeared complete.	0	13.6 ha
Gaven Reefs	(Philippines) Burgos		0	13.6 ha
Gaven Reefs	(Vietnam) Đá Ga Ven (N. reef) / Đá Lạc (S. reef)		0	13.6 ha
Hughes Reef	(China) 东门礁 Dongmen Jiao	9°55′N 114°30′E - Part of Union Banks. Natural features Lies 9 miles (14 km) to the east of Sin Cowe Island. Naturally above water at least at low tide. Occupation before land reclamation Occupied since 1988. Has a lighthouse on top of a two storied Chinese defence outpost. Land reclamation Imagery captured on 24 January 2015 shows 0.75 km^{2} of reclaimed land and the construction of a large facility in progress. By June 2015, the land reclamation had reached 0.76 km2 and appeared complete.	0	7.6 ha
Hughes Reef	(Philippines) Burunyugan 4	9°55′N 114°30′E - Part of Union Banks. Natural features Lies 9 miles (14 km) to the east of Sin Cowe Island. Naturally above water at least at low tide. Occupation before land reclamation Occupied since 1988. Has a lighthouse on top of a two storied Chinese defence outpost. Land reclamation Imagery captured on 24 January 2015 shows 0.75 km^{2} of reclaimed land and the construction of a large facility in progress. By June 2015, the land reclamation had reached 0.76 km2 and appeared complete.	0	7.6 ha
Hughes Reef	(Vietnam) Đá Tư Nghĩa	9°55′N 114°30′E - Part of Union Banks. Natural features Lies 9 miles (14 km) to the east of Sin Cowe Island. Naturally above water at least at low tide. Occupation before land reclamation Occupied since 1988. Has a lighthouse on top of a two storied Chinese defence outpost. Land reclamation Imagery captured on 24 January 2015 shows 0.75 km^{2} of reclaimed land and the construction of a large facility in progress. By June 2015, the land reclamation had reached 0.76 km2 and appeared complete.	0	7.6 ha
Johnson South Reef	(China) 赤瓜礁 Chigua Jiao	9.71389°N 114.286°E - Part of Union Banks. Natural features Contiguous with Vietnam-occupied Collins Reef which lies 4 miles (6 km) away northwest. Naturally above water only at low tide, but many rocks above water at high tide. Occupation before land reclamation Site of 1988 PRC/Vietnam clash. Occupied since 1988. As of 2011, has permanent reef fortresses and supply platforms able to resist winds up to 71 knots and equipped with VHF / UHF communications equipment, search radars as well as naval guns and anti-aircraft guns, which can serve as docks for Chinese navy patrol boats. Land reclamation Intelligence reports of November 2014 observed that the reef has been transformed into an island about 500m by 200m due to PRC land reclamation activities. By June 2015, the land reclamation had reached 0.109 km2 and appeared complete.	0	10.9 ha
Johnson South Reef	(Philippines) Mabini		0	10.9 ha
Johnson South Reef	(Vietnam) Đá Gạc Ma		0	10.9 ha
Mischief Reef	(China) 美济礁 Meiji Jiao	9°55′N 115°32′E - East of the centre of Dangerous Ground. Natural features Some rocks above water at low tide. Has a large lagoon. Occupation before land reclamation In February 1995, PRC had built a wooden complex on stilts here, starting its formal occupation of the feature. In 1999, the Philippines protested over the expanded structures claiming that it is a military outpost and it poses danger to Philippine security and national defense, being 130 miles (209 km) from Palawan. PRC claimed it was a shelter for fishermen. By 2011, the "shelters" were equipped with satellite communications and radars, and the reef had four building complexes with 13 multi-storey buildings. Fifty Chinese Marines are permanently stationed there. Land reclamation In March 2015, it was detected that the PRC had started land reclamation activities on the reef. By April 2015, the reclaimed area had rapidly grown to almost 2.5 km2, and further reclamation was on-going around the reef. By June 2015, the land reclamation had reached 5.58 km2 and appeared nearing completion.	0	558 ha
Mischief Reef	(Philippines) Panganiban		0	558 ha
Mischief Reef	(Vietnam) Đá Vành Khăn		0	558 ha
Subi (Zhubi) Reef	(China) 渚碧礁 Zhubi Dao	10°54′48″N 114°03′43″E - West of Thitu Reefs. Natural features Lies 16 miles (26 km) southwest of Philippine-occupied Thitu Island (Pagasa Island). Naturally above water only at low tide. Surrounds a lagoon. Occupation before land reclamation As of 2011, PRC has built a permanent reef fortress and supply platform that can house 160 troops. This garrison has a helipad and is armed with four twin barrel 37-millimeter naval guns. Houses a doppler weather radar. Land reclamation Intelligence reports of March 2015 observed that the reef has been transformed into an island about 1.8 km^{2} due to PRC land reclamation activities. In April 2015, the reclaimed area was about 2.27 km2 and growing. Two months later, the reclaimed area had grown to 3.87 km2. Later in June 2015, the land reclamation had reached 3.95 km2 and appeared nearing completion.	0	395 ha
Subi (Zhubi) Reef	(Philippines) Zamora		0	395 ha
Subi (Zhubi) Reef	(Vietnam) Đá Xu Bi		0	395 ha
Total		7 reefs of which 7 have artificial islands	0	1350.6 ha

==== Republic of China (Taiwan) ====
Republic of China (Taiwan)
Int'l Name	Local Names	Description	Area (ha.)	Reclaimed area
Taiping Island / Itu Aba	(Taiwan) 太平島 Tàipíng Dǎo	10°22′30″N 114°22′0″E - Part of Tizard Banks. The largest of the Spratly islands, and one of the few islands in the South China Sea with its own source of fresh water. Located about 22 miles (35 km) south-southwest of Philippine-occupied Loaita (Kota) Island and about 6 miles (10 km) west of Vietnam-occupied Sand Cay. Covered with shrubs, coconut and mangroves. 600 soldiers stationed, lighthouse, radio and weather stations, concrete landing jetty and two wells at the SW end. Guano deposits, fringing reef. Hainan fishermen used to visit annually. In August 1993, plans were announced for a 2 km-long airstrip and a fishing port. The now only 1150-meters-long airstrip was completed in January 2008. Pineapple was once cultivated here. Occupied since September 1956, four months after Filipino Tomas Cloma claimed the islands.	46	
Taiping Island / Itu Aba	(Philippines) Ligaw		46	
Taiping Island / Itu Aba	(Vietnam) Đảo Ba Bình		46	
Taiping Island / Itu Aba	Other names:	Ligao, Huángshānmǎ Jiāo (黃山馬礁), Huángshānmǎ Zhì (黃山馬峙), Nagashima (長島)	46	
Ban Than Reef / Zhongzhou Reef	(Taiwan) 中洲礁 Zhongzhou Jiao	10°23′10″N 114°24′49″E - Part of Tizard Banks. Lies 3 miles (5 km) east of Itu Aba Island and 3 miles (5 km) west of Vietnamese occupied Sand Cay. Small drying reef. "Construction project" underway since March 1995.	0	
Ban Than Reef / Zhongzhou Reef	(Philippines) Silangang Ligaw	10°23′10″N 114°24′49″E - Part of Tizard Banks. Lies 3 miles (5 km) east of Itu Aba Island and 3 miles (5 km) west of Vietnamese occupied Sand Cay. Small drying reef. "Construction project" underway since March 1995.	0	
Ban Than Reef / Zhongzhou Reef	(Vietnam) Bãi Bàn Than	10°23′10″N 114°24′49″E - Part of Tizard Banks. Lies 3 miles (5 km) east of Itu Aba Island and 3 miles (5 km) west of Vietnamese occupied Sand Cay. Small drying reef. "Construction project" underway since March 1995.	0	
Total		1 island and 1 reef	46	

==== Republic of the Philippines ====
Republic of the Philippines
Int'l Name	Local Names	Description	Area (ha.)	Reclaimed area
Flat Island	(Philippines) Patag	10°49′00″N 115°49′20″E; The fourteenth largest Spratly island. About 6 miles (10 km) southwest of Philippine-occupied Lawak Island (Nanshan Island). It changes its shape seasonally; the sand build up depends largely on the direction of prevailing wind and waves - the island has taken an elongated shape, the shape of a crescent moon, and the shape of a letter "S". Like Panata Island (Lankiam Cay), it is also barren of any vegetation. No underground water source is found in the island. Presently, the island serves as a military observation post for the Municipality of Kalayaan. A low, flat, sandy cay, 240m by 90m, subject to erosion. No vegetation. Several soldiers stationed.	0.57	
Flat Island	(China) 费信岛 (Taiwan) 費信島; Feixin Dao		0.57	
Flat Island	(Vietnam) Đảo Bình Nguyên		0.57	
Lankiam Cay	(Philippines) Kota Cay	The sixteenth largest and the smallest Spratly island. Located 8 miles (13 km) northeast of Philippine-occupied Kota Island (Lankiam Cay). A few years ago this island has a surface area of more than 5 hectares but strong waves brought by a strong typhoon washed out the sandy surface (beach) of the island leaving behind today the calcarenite foundation that can be seen at low tide. Several soldiers stationed. Part of Loaita Banks.	0.44	
Lankiam Cay	(China) 杨信沙洲 (Taiwan) 杨信沙洲; Yangxin Shazhou	The sixteenth largest and the smallest Spratly island. Located 8 miles (13 km) northeast of Philippine-occupied Kota Island (Lankiam Cay). A few years ago this island has a surface area of more than 5 hectares but strong waves brought by a strong typhoon washed out the sandy surface (beach) of the island leaving behind today the calcarenite foundation that can be seen at low tide. Several soldiers stationed. Part of Loaita Banks.	0.44	
Lankiam Cay	(Vietnam) Đá An Nhơn	The sixteenth largest and the smallest Spratly island. Located 8 miles (13 km) northeast of Philippine-occupied Kota Island (Lankiam Cay). A few years ago this island has a surface area of more than 5 hectares but strong waves brought by a strong typhoon washed out the sandy surface (beach) of the island leaving behind today the calcarenite foundation that can be seen at low tide. Several soldiers stationed. Part of Loaita Banks.	0.44	
Loaita Cay	(Philippines) Panata	The fifteenth largest Spratly island. It's located about 5 nautical miles (9.3 km; 5.8 mi) northwest of Philippine-occupied Loaita Island, just west of the north of Dangerous Ground. The island is a low, flat, sandy cay, and is subject to erosion. It changes its shape seasonally. The sand build up depends largely on the direction of prevailing winds and waves; it has taken an elongated shape for some years. Several soldiers stationed. Occupied since 1968. Part of Loaita Banks.	0.53	
Loaita Cay	(China) 南钥沙洲 (Taiwan) 南钥沙洲; Nanyao Shazhou	The fifteenth largest Spratly island. It's located about 5 nautical miles (9.3 km; 5.8 mi) northwest of Philippine-occupied Loaita Island, just west of the north of Dangerous Ground. The island is a low, flat, sandy cay, and is subject to erosion. It changes its shape seasonally. The sand build up depends largely on the direction of prevailing winds and waves; it has taken an elongated shape for some years. Several soldiers stationed. Occupied since 1968. Part of Loaita Banks.	0.53	
Loaita Cay	(Vietnam) Đảo Loại Ta Tây	The fifteenth largest Spratly island. It's located about 5 nautical miles (9.3 km; 5.8 mi) northwest of Philippine-occupied Loaita Island, just west of the north of Dangerous Ground. The island is a low, flat, sandy cay, and is subject to erosion. It changes its shape seasonally. The sand build up depends largely on the direction of prevailing winds and waves; it has taken an elongated shape for some years. Several soldiers stationed. Occupied since 1968. Part of Loaita Banks.	0.53	
Loaita Island	(Philippines) Kota	The tenth largest Spratly island. Located 22 miles (35 km) southeast of Philippine-occupied Pag-asa Island (Thitu Island) and 22 miles (35 km) north-northeast of the ROC-occupied Taiping Island. It fringes the Laoita bank and reef. Its calcarenite outcrop is visible along its western side at low tide. The present shape of the island indicates sand buildup along its eastern side. The anchor-shaped side will eventually connect with the northern portion as the sand buildup continues thereby creating another mini-lagoon in the process. The presence of migrating sea birds adds to the high phosphorus contents of the sand found in the island. Occasionally, giant sea turtles are reported to be laying their eggs in the island. Covered with mangrove bushes, above which rose coconut palms and other small trees. Several soldiers stationed. Occupied since 1968. Part of Loaita Banks.	6.45	
Loaita Island	(China) 南钥岛 (Taiwan) 南鑰島; Nanyue Dao		6.45	
Loaita Island	(Vietnam) Đảo Loại Ta		6.45	
Nanshan Island	(Philippines) Lawak	10°45′N 115°49′E; The eighth largest Spratly island. Located 98.0 miles (157.7 km) east of Pag-asa (Thitu Island). This island is a bird sanctuary. Its surroundings are highly phosphatized that superphosphate materials can be mined out on a small-scale basis. Near the fringes of the breakwaters (approx. 2 miles (3 km) from the island), intact hard coral reefs were observed to retain their natural environment and beautiful tropical fishes were seen colonizing these coral beds of varying colors. Covered with coconut trees, bushes and grass. 580 m long, on the edge of a submerged reef. Several soldiers stationed. Has a small helipad.	7.93	
Nanshan Island	(China) 马欢岛 (Taiwan) 馬歡島; Mahuan Dao		7.93	
Nanshan Island	(Vietnam) Đảo Vĩnh Viễn		7.93	
Northeast Cay	(Philippines) Parola	11°28′N 114°21′E; The fifth largest Spratly island. Only 1.75 miles (2.82 km) north of Vietnamese-occupied Southwest Cay and can be seen before the horizon. Located 28 miles (45 km) northwest of Philippine-occupied Pag-asa (Thitu Island). Some of its outcrops are visible on its western side. It has high salinity groundwater and vegetation limited to beach type of plants. The corals around the island were mostly destroyed by rampant use of dynamite fishing and cyanide method employed by foreign fishing boats in the past. Covered with grass and thick trees. Much of the ringing reef is above water at high tide. Supported a beacon in 1984. Has Guano deposits. Several soldiers stationed. Satellite photography suggests it may have an airstrip. (Note: Possible airstrip on Northeast Cay at 11°27'12.79"N 114°21'21.61"E) Occupied since 1968. Part of North Danger Reef.	12.7	
Northeast Cay	(China) 北子岛 Beizi Dao (Taiwan) 北子礁 Beizi Jiao		12.7	
Northeast Cay	(Vietnam) Đảo Song Tử Đông		12.7	
Thitu Island	(Philippines) Pag-asa	The second largest Spratly island. Serves as the poblacion for the Municipality of Kalayaan, Palawan, Phils. It is covered with trees and has a variety of fauna. It is home to some 300+ civilians (including children) and over 50 soldiers. Other islands are expected to be populated before 2010. Population is regulated to protect the islands' flora and fauna and to avoid tension with other countries. It has 1.4 km airstrip, a marina, water filtering plant, power generator and a commercial communications tower (by Smart Communications), and a school. The Philippines' Department of Tourism is making improvements to the island to make it profitable. Occupied since 1971. Part of Thitu Reefs.	37.2	
Thitu Island	(China) 中业岛 (Taiwan) 中業島; Zhongye Dao		37.2	
Thitu Island	(Vietnam) Đảo Thị Tứ		37.2	
West York Island	(Philippines) Likas	11°05′N 115°01′E; The third largest Spratly island. This island is located 47 miles (76 km) northeast of Pag-asa (Thitu Island). Outcrops are visible on the southern and eastern portion of the island during low tides. This island is considered a sanctuary for giant sea turtles that lay their eggs on the island all year round. The high salinity of the ground water in the island retards the growth of introduced trees like coconuts, ipil-ipil, and other types. Only those endemic to the area that are mostly beach type of plants thrive and survive the hot and humid condition especially during the dry season. Has an observation post. Several soldiers stationed.	18.6	
West York Island	(China) 西月岛 (Taiwan) 西月島; Xiyue Dao		18.6	
West York Island	(Vietnam) Đảo Bến Lạc (Đảo Dừa)		18.6	
Commodore Reef	(Philippines) Rizal	A sand "cay", 0.5 m high, surrounded by two lagoons. Parts of reef above water at high tide. It is a typical reef lying underwater and is now being manned by a military contingent based and established in the area. Some structures. Several soldiers stationed. Occupied since 1978.	0	
Commodore Reef	(China) 司令礁 (Taiwan) 司令礁; Siling Jiao	A sand "cay", 0.5 m high, surrounded by two lagoons. Parts of reef above water at high tide. It is a typical reef lying underwater and is now being manned by a military contingent based and established in the area. Some structures. Several soldiers stationed. Occupied since 1978.	0	
Commodore Reef	(Vietnam) Đá Công Đo	A sand "cay", 0.5 m high, surrounded by two lagoons. Parts of reef above water at high tide. It is a typical reef lying underwater and is now being manned by a military contingent based and established in the area. Some structures. Several soldiers stationed. Occupied since 1978.	0	
Commodore Reef	(Malaysia) Terumbu Laksamana	A sand "cay", 0.5 m high, surrounded by two lagoons. Parts of reef above water at high tide. It is a typical reef lying underwater and is now being manned by a military contingent based and established in the area. Some structures. Several soldiers stationed. Occupied since 1978.	0	
Irving Reef	(Philippines) Balagtas	Naturally above water only at low tide. A very small cay lies at northern end. Some structures. Several soldiers stationed.	0	
Irving Reef	(China) 火艾礁 (Taiwan) 火艾礁; Huo'ai Jiao	Naturally above water only at low tide. A very small cay lies at northern end. Some structures. Several soldiers stationed.	0	
Irving Reef	(Vietnam) Đá Cá Nhám	Naturally above water only at low tide. A very small cay lies at northern end. Some structures. Several soldiers stationed.	0	
Second Thomas Reef / shoal (Note: No comprehensive list of Philippine-occupied Spratly islands is easily available. A web search can confirm that Ayungin Reef is occupied by the Philippines.)	(Philippines) Ayungin	A shallow reef. It is close to Chinese-occupied Mischief Reef. It was occupied by the Philippines in 1999, after the 1995 controversial Chinese occupation of Mischief Reef, to put pressure on China not to occupy any features further which lie near the Philippines.	0	
Second Thomas Reef / shoal	(China) 仁爱礁 Ren'ai Jiao (Taiwan) 仁愛暗沙 Ren'ai Ansha	A shallow reef. It is close to Chinese-occupied Mischief Reef. It was occupied by the Philippines in 1999, after the 1995 controversial Chinese occupation of Mischief Reef, to put pressure on China not to occupy any features further which lie near the Philippines.	0	
Second Thomas Reef / shoal	(Vietnam) Bãi Cỏ Mây	A shallow reef. It is close to Chinese-occupied Mischief Reef. It was occupied by the Philippines in 1999, after the 1995 controversial Chinese occupation of Mischief Reef, to put pressure on China not to occupy any features further which lie near the Philippines.	0	
Total		8 islands and 3 reefs	84.42	

==== Socialist Republic of Vietnam ====
Socialist Republic of Vietnam
Int'l Name	Local Names	Description	Area (ha.)	Reclaimed area
Southwest Cay	(Philippines) Pugad	11°28′N 114°21′E; The sixth largest Spratly island. Only 1.75 miles (2.82 km) from Northeast Cay and can be seen before the horizon. Previously a breeding place for birds and covered with trees and guano. Export of guano was once carried out "on a considerable scale." Fringing reef partly above water at high tide. Vietnam erected its first lighthouse in the Spratlys here in October 1993 and built an airstrip. Has a three-story building, garrisoned by soldiers. Philippine military controlled the island before the early 1970s. South Vietnamese forces (Republic of Vietnam) invaded the island in 1975, when Filipino soldiers guarding the island attended the birthday party of their commanding officer based in the nearby Northeast Cay. A confirmed report came out that Vietnamese prostitutes were sent by Vietnamese officials to the birthday party, supposedly a sign of good brotherhood between the forces, but was actually used to lure the Filipino soldiers guarding the island. Filipino forces apparently planned on attacking the island, thus it would have led to a war, but Vietnamese forces were able to erect a huge garrison in the island within few weeks, forcing Filipino officials to abort the plan. Since then, more soldiers were assigned to Parola Island (North East Cay), to avoid it from happening again. This was confirmed by interviews with soldiers involved in an episode of the defunct ABS-CBN's Magandang Gabi Bayan (Good Evening Nation) program. See Policies, activities and history of the Philippines in Spratly Islands#Southwest Cay invasion for more details. Part of North Danger Reef.	12	
Southwest Cay	(China) 南子岛 Nanzi Dao (Taiwan) 南子礁 Nanzi Jiao		12	
Southwest Cay	(Vietnam) Đảo Song Tử Tây		12	
Sand Cay	(Philippines) Bailan	10°23′N 114°29′E; The ninth largest Spratly island. Lies 6 miles (10 km) to the east of Taiwan-occupied Taiping Island. Covered with trees and bushes. Fringing reef partly above water at low tide. This feature is commonly confused with Sandy Cay. Occupied since 1974. Part of Tizard Banks.	7	
Sand Cay	(China) 敦谦沙洲 (Taiwan) 敦謙沙洲; Dunqian Shazhou	10°23′N 114°29′E; The ninth largest Spratly island. Lies 6 miles (10 km) to the east of Taiwan-occupied Taiping Island. Covered with trees and bushes. Fringing reef partly above water at low tide. This feature is commonly confused with Sandy Cay. Occupied since 1974. Part of Tizard Banks.	7	
Sand Cay	(Vietnam) Đảo Sơn Ca	10°23′N 114°29′E; The ninth largest Spratly island. Lies 6 miles (10 km) to the east of Taiwan-occupied Taiping Island. Covered with trees and bushes. Fringing reef partly above water at low tide. This feature is commonly confused with Sandy Cay. Occupied since 1974. Part of Tizard Banks.	7	
Namyit Island	(Philippines) Binago	10°11′N 114°22′E; The twelfth largest Spratly island. Covered with small trees, bushes and grass. Has a fringing reef and is inhabited by sea birds. The island is inhabited by an unknown number of Vietnamese soldiers and in the deep waters fronting the south side it is said that a submarine base is situated. Occupied since 1975.Part of Tizard Banks.	5.3	
Namyit Island	(China) 鸿庥岛 (Taiwan) 鴻庥島; Hongxiu Dao	10°11′N 114°22′E; The twelfth largest Spratly island. Covered with small trees, bushes and grass. Has a fringing reef and is inhabited by sea birds. The island is inhabited by an unknown number of Vietnamese soldiers and in the deep waters fronting the south side it is said that a submarine base is situated. Occupied since 1975.Part of Tizard Banks.	5.3	
Namyit Island	(Vietnam) Đảo Nam Yết	10°11′N 114°22′E; The twelfth largest Spratly island. Covered with small trees, bushes and grass. Has a fringing reef and is inhabited by sea birds. The island is inhabited by an unknown number of Vietnamese soldiers and in the deep waters fronting the south side it is said that a submarine base is situated. Occupied since 1975.Part of Tizard Banks.	5.3	
Sin Cowe Island	(Philippines) Rurok	9°52′N 114°19′E; The seventh largest. Has fringing reef which is above water at low tide. Occupied since 1974. Part of Union Banks.	8	
Sin Cowe Island	(China) 景宏岛 (Taiwan) 景宏島; Jinghong Dao	9°52′N 114°19′E; The seventh largest. Has fringing reef which is above water at low tide. Occupied since 1974. Part of Union Banks.	8	
Sin Cowe Island	(Vietnam) Đảo Sinh Tồn	9°52′N 114°19′E; The seventh largest. Has fringing reef which is above water at low tide. Occupied since 1974. Part of Union Banks.	8	
Spratly Island / Storm Island	(Philippines) Lagos	8°38′N 114°25′E; The fourth largest Spratly island. 2.5 m high, flat. Covered with bushes, grass, birds and guano. 5.5 m-high obelisk at southern tip. Has landing strip, and a fishing port. Fringing reef is above water at low tide. Some structures with soldiers stationed. Occupied since 1974.	13	
Spratly Island / Storm Island	(China) 南威岛 (Taiwan) 南威島; Nanwei Dao	8°38′N 114°25′E; The fourth largest Spratly island. 2.5 m high, flat. Covered with bushes, grass, birds and guano. 5.5 m-high obelisk at southern tip. Has landing strip, and a fishing port. Fringing reef is above water at low tide. Some structures with soldiers stationed. Occupied since 1974.	13	
Spratly Island / Storm Island	(Vietnam) Đảo Trường Sa	8°38′N 114°25′E; The fourth largest Spratly island. 2.5 m high, flat. Covered with bushes, grass, birds and guano. 5.5 m-high obelisk at southern tip. Has landing strip, and a fishing port. Fringing reef is above water at low tide. Some structures with soldiers stationed. Occupied since 1974.	13	
Amboyna Cay	(Philippines) Datu Kalantiaw	07°54′N 112°55′E; The thirteenth largest Spratly island. 2m high. Two parts: East part consists of sand and coral, west part is covered with guano. Has fringing reef. An obelisk, about 2.7 m high, stands on the SW corner. Little vegetation. Lighthouse operational since May 1995. Heavily fortified.	1.6	
Amboyna Cay	(China) 安波沙洲 (Taiwan) 安波沙洲; Anbo Shazhou	07°54′N 112°55′E; The thirteenth largest Spratly island. 2m high. Two parts: East part consists of sand and coral, west part is covered with guano. Has fringing reef. An obelisk, about 2.7 m high, stands on the SW corner. Little vegetation. Lighthouse operational since May 1995. Heavily fortified.	1.6	
Amboyna Cay	(Vietnam) Đảo An Bang	07°54′N 112°55′E; The thirteenth largest Spratly island. 2m high. Two parts: East part consists of sand and coral, west part is covered with guano. Has fringing reef. An obelisk, about 2.7 m high, stands on the SW corner. Little vegetation. Lighthouse operational since May 1995. Heavily fortified.	1.6	
Amboyna Cay	(Malaysia) Pulau Amboyna Kecil	07°54′N 112°55′E; The thirteenth largest Spratly island. 2m high. Two parts: East part consists of sand and coral, west part is covered with guano. Has fringing reef. An obelisk, about 2.7 m high, stands on the SW corner. Little vegetation. Lighthouse operational since May 1995. Heavily fortified.	1.6	
Grierson Reef	(Philippines) Burunyugan 14	A sand cay with fringing reef. (Despite some ambiguity in various references, this is NOT Sin Cowe East Island.) Its sand bar area is about 12 hectares. Part of Union Banks.	0	
Grierson Reef	(China) 染青沙洲 Ranqing Shazhou	A sand cay with fringing reef. (Despite some ambiguity in various references, this is NOT Sin Cowe East Island.) Its sand bar area is about 12 hectares. Part of Union Banks.	0	
Grierson Reef	(Vietnam) Đảo Sinh Tồn Đông	A sand cay with fringing reef. (Despite some ambiguity in various references, this is NOT Sin Cowe East Island.) Its sand bar area is about 12 hectares. Part of Union Banks.	0	
Central London Reef	(Philippines) Gitnang Quezon	08°59′N 112°21′E; SW part is a sandbank which barely submerges at high tide. The rest is coral reef, awash, surrounding a lagoon. Occupied since 1978. Part of London Reefs.	0	
Central London Reef	(China) 中礁 (Taiwan) 中礁; Zhong Jiao	08°59′N 112°21′E; SW part is a sandbank which barely submerges at high tide. The rest is coral reef, awash, surrounding a lagoon. Occupied since 1978. Part of London Reefs.	0	
Central London Reef	(Vietnam) Đảo Trường Sa Đông	08°59′N 112°21′E; SW part is a sandbank which barely submerges at high tide. The rest is coral reef, awash, surrounding a lagoon. Occupied since 1978. Part of London Reefs.	0	
Pearson Reef	(Philippines) Hizon	Two sand "cays", 2 m and 1 m high, lie on the edges of a lagoon. Parts of the surrounding reef are above water at high tide. Occupied since 1988.	0	
Pearson Reef	(China) 毕生礁 Bisheng Jiao	Two sand "cays", 2 m and 1 m high, lie on the edges of a lagoon. Parts of the surrounding reef are above water at high tide. Occupied since 1988.	0	
Pearson Reef	(Vietnam) Đảo Phan Vinh	Two sand "cays", 2 m and 1 m high, lie on the edges of a lagoon. Parts of the surrounding reef are above water at high tide. Occupied since 1988.	0	
Barque Canada Reef / Lizzie Weber Reef	(Philippines) (Barque Canada Reef) Mascardo	8°10′N 113°18′E; Coral. Highest rocks are 4.5 m high, at SW end. Much of reef is above water at high tide. Some sandy patches. 18 miles (29 km) long. Its military structures have been upgraded. Occupied since 1987.	0	
Barque Canada Reef / Lizzie Weber Reef	(Philippines) (Lizzie Weber Reef) Magsaysay	8°10′N 113°18′E; Coral. Highest rocks are 4.5 m high, at SW end. Much of reef is above water at high tide. Some sandy patches. 18 miles (29 km) long. Its military structures have been upgraded. Occupied since 1987.	0	
Barque Canada Reef / Lizzie Weber Reef	(China) 柏礁 Bai Jiao, Liwei Dao	8°10′N 113°18′E; Coral. Highest rocks are 4.5 m high, at SW end. Much of reef is above water at high tide. Some sandy patches. 18 miles (29 km) long. Its military structures have been upgraded. Occupied since 1987.	0	
Barque Canada Reef / Lizzie Weber Reef	(Vietnam) Bãi Thuyền Chài	8°10′N 113°18′E; Coral. Highest rocks are 4.5 m high, at SW end. Much of reef is above water at high tide. Some sandy patches. 18 miles (29 km) long. Its military structures have been upgraded. Occupied since 1987.	0	
Barque Canada Reef / Lizzie Weber Reef	(Malaysia) Terumbu Perahu	8°10′N 113°18′E; Coral. Highest rocks are 4.5 m high, at SW end. Much of reef is above water at high tide. Some sandy patches. 18 miles (29 km) long. Its military structures have been upgraded. Occupied since 1987.	0	
West London Reef	(Philippines) Kanlurang Quezon	East part is sand "cay", 0.6 m high. West part is coral reef which is above water only at low tide. Between them is a lagoon. Vietnam erected a lighthouse here in May or June 1994. Part of London Reefs.	0	
West London Reef	(China) 西礁 Xi Jiao	East part is sand "cay", 0.6 m high. West part is coral reef which is above water only at low tide. Between them is a lagoon. Vietnam erected a lighthouse here in May or June 1994. Part of London Reefs.	0	
West London Reef	(Vietnam) Đá Tây	East part is sand "cay", 0.6 m high. West part is coral reef which is above water only at low tide. Between them is a lagoon. Vietnam erected a lighthouse here in May or June 1994. Part of London Reefs.	0	
Ladd Reef	(China) 日积礁 Riji Jiao	Naturally above water at low tide. Has coral lagoon. Occupied since 1988.	0	
Ladd Reef	(Vietnam) Đá Lát	Naturally above water at low tide. Has coral lagoon. Occupied since 1988.	0	
Discovery Great Reef	(Philippines) Paredes	Several rocks are above water at high tide. Most of reef is above water at low tide. Has lagoon. Occupied since 1988.	0	
Discovery Great Reef	(China) 大现礁 Daxian Jiao	Several rocks are above water at high tide. Most of reef is above water at low tide. Has lagoon. Occupied since 1988.	0	
Discovery Great Reef	(Vietnam) Đá Lớn	Several rocks are above water at high tide. Most of reef is above water at low tide. Has lagoon. Occupied since 1988.	0	
Pigeon Reef / Tennent Reef	(Philippines) Lopez-Jaena	Numerous rocks are naturally above the high tide line. Encloses a lagoon. Occupied since 1988.	0	
Pigeon Reef / Tennent Reef	(China) 无乜礁 Wumie Jiao	Numerous rocks are naturally above the high tide line. Encloses a lagoon. Occupied since 1988.	0	
Pigeon Reef / Tennent Reef	(Vietnam) Đá Tiên Nữ	Numerous rocks are naturally above the high tide line. Encloses a lagoon. Occupied since 1988.	0	
East London Reef	(Philippines) Silangang Quezon	Rocks up to 1 m high. Encloses a lagoon. Occupied since 1988. Part of London Reefs.	0	
East London Reef	(China) 东礁 Dong Jiao	Rocks up to 1 m high. Encloses a lagoon. Occupied since 1988. Part of London Reefs.	0	
East London Reef	(Vietnam) Đá Đông	Rocks up to 1 m high. Encloses a lagoon. Occupied since 1988. Part of London Reefs.	0	
Alison Reef	(Philippines) De Jesus	8°51′N 114°00′E; Naturally above water only at low tide. Encloses a lagoon.	0	
Alison Reef	(China) 六门礁 Liumen Jiao	8°51′N 114°00′E; Naturally above water only at low tide. Encloses a lagoon.	0	
Alison Reef	(Vietnam) Đá Tốc Tan	8°51′N 114°00′E; Naturally above water only at low tide. Encloses a lagoon.	0	
Cornwallis South Reef	(Philippines) Osmeña	Naturally above water only at low tide. Encloses a lagoon. Occupied since 1988.	0	
Cornwallis South Reef	(China) 南华礁 Nanhua Jiao	Naturally above water only at low tide. Encloses a lagoon. Occupied since 1988.	0	
Cornwallis South Reef	(Vietnam) Đá Núi Le	Naturally above water only at low tide. Encloses a lagoon. Occupied since 1988.	0	
Petley Reef	(Philippines) Juan Luna	Naturally above water only at low tide, some small rocks might stand above high water. Occupied since 1988. Part of Tizard Banks.	0	
Petley Reef	(China) 舶兰礁 Bolan Jiao	Naturally above water only at low tide, some small rocks might stand above high water. Occupied since 1988. Part of Tizard Banks.	0	
Petley Reef	(Vietnam) Đá Núi Thị	Naturally above water only at low tide, some small rocks might stand above high water. Occupied since 1988. Part of Tizard Banks.	0	
South Reef	(Philippines) Timog Peligro	Lies about 2.5 miles (4 km) southwest of Vietnam-occupied Southwest Cay. A tiny cay appears atop this reef on the most detailed map available. On the southwest end of North Danger Reef. Fringing reef is above water at low tide. Occupied since 1988. Part of North Danger Reef.	0	
South Reef	(China) 奈罗礁 Nailuo Jiao	Lies about 2.5 miles (4 km) southwest of Vietnam-occupied Southwest Cay. A tiny cay appears atop this reef on the most detailed map available. On the southwest end of North Danger Reef. Fringing reef is above water at low tide. Occupied since 1988. Part of North Danger Reef.	0	
South Reef	(Vietnam) Đá Nam	Lies about 2.5 miles (4 km) southwest of Vietnam-occupied Southwest Cay. A tiny cay appears atop this reef on the most detailed map available. On the southwest end of North Danger Reef. Fringing reef is above water at low tide. Occupied since 1988. Part of North Danger Reef.	0	
Collins Reef / Johnson North Reef	(Philippines) Roxas	09°46′N 114°15′E; Lies 8 miles (13 km) southwest of Vietnam-occupied Sin Cowe Island. Connected to Johnson South Reef. A "coral dune" is located at the southeast corner, above the high tide line. Part of Union Banks.	0	
Collins Reef / Johnson North Reef	(China) 鬼喊礁 Guihan Jiao	09°46′N 114°15′E; Lies 8 miles (13 km) southwest of Vietnam-occupied Sin Cowe Island. Connected to Johnson South Reef. A "coral dune" is located at the southeast corner, above the high tide line. Part of Union Banks.	0	
Collins Reef / Johnson North Reef	(Vietnam) Đá Cô Lin	09°46′N 114°15′E; Lies 8 miles (13 km) southwest of Vietnam-occupied Sin Cowe Island. Connected to Johnson South Reef. A "coral dune" is located at the southeast corner, above the high tide line. Part of Union Banks.	0	
Lan(d)sdowne Reef	(Philippines) Burunyugan 8	Sand dune, with fringing reef. Part of Union Banks.	0	
Lan(d)sdowne Reef	(China) 琼礁 Qiong Jiao	Sand dune, with fringing reef. Part of Union Banks.	0	
Lan(d)sdowne Reef	(Vietnam) Đá Len Đao	Sand dune, with fringing reef. Part of Union Banks.	0	
Rifleman Bank (containing Bombay Castle)	(China) 南薇滩 Nanwei Tan	Shallowest natural depth is 3 m, called Bombay Castle. Sand and coral. Occupied since 1989.	0	
Rifleman Bank (containing Bombay Castle)	(Vietnam) Bãi Vũng Mây	Shallowest natural depth is 3 m, called Bombay Castle. Sand and coral. Occupied since 1989.	0	
Prince of Wales Bank	(China) 广雅滩 Guangya Tan	Shallowest natural depth is 7 m. Has corals. Occupied since 1989.	0	
Prince of Wales Bank	(Vietnam) Bãi Phúc Tần	Shallowest natural depth is 7 m. Has corals. Occupied since 1989.	0	
Vanguard Bank	(China) 万安滩 Wan'an Tan	Shallowest natural depth is 16 m. Vietnam has run three "economic technological service stations" in this area since July 1994. Occupied since 1989.	0	
Vanguard Bank	(Vietnam) Bãi Tư Chính	Shallowest natural depth is 16 m. Vietnam has run three "economic technological service stations" in this area since July 1994. Occupied since 1989.	0	
Prince Consort Bank	(China) 西卫滩 Xiwei Tan	Shallowest natural depth is 9 m. Occupied since 1990.	0	
Prince Consort Bank	(Vietnam) Bãi Phúc Nguyên	Shallowest natural depth is 9 m. Occupied since 1990.	0	
Grainger Bank	(China) 李准滩 Lizhun Tan	Shallowest natural depth is either 9 m or 11 m. Occupied since 1991.	0	
Grainger Bank	(Vietnam) Bãi Quế Đường	Shallowest natural depth is either 9 m or 11 m. Occupied since 1991.	0	
Alexandra Bank	(China) 人骏滩 Renjun Tan	Shallowest natural depth is 5 m. Occupied since 1991.	0	
Alexandra Bank	(Vietnam) Bãi Huyền Trân	Shallowest natural depth is 5 m. Occupied since 1991.	0	
Orleana Shoal	(China) 奥南暗沙 Aonan Ansha		0	
Orleana Shoal	(Vietnam) Bãi Đất		0	
Kingston Shoal	(China) 金盾暗沙 Jindun Ansha		0	
Kingston Shoal	(Vietnam) Bãi Đinh		0	
Total		6 islands, 15 reefs, 6 banks, and 2 shoals	46.9	

=== Unoccupied but largely controlled by China ===
Unoccupied but largely controlled by China
China
Int'l Name	Local Names	Description	Area (ha.)	Reclaimed area
Hallet Reef	(China) 安乐礁 Anle Jiao (Taiwan) 安樂礁	near (China) Hughes Reef	0	0
Hallet Reef	(Philippines) Burunyugan 3	near (China) Hughes Reef	0	0
Hallet Reef	(Vietnam) Đá Bình Sơn	near (China) Hughes Reef	0	0
McKennan Reef	(China) 西门礁 Ximen Jiao (Taiwan) 西門礁	near (China) Hughes Reef	0	0
McKennan Reef	(Philippines) Burunyugan 5	near (China) Hughes Reef	0	0
McKennan Reef	(Vietnam) Đá Ken Nan	near (China) Hughes Reef	0	0
Eldad Reef	(China) 安达礁 Anda Jiao (Taiwan) 安達礁	China Coast Guard regular patrols. It is also under the control of Vietnam, near Vietnam-occupied Petley Reef	0	0
Eldad Reef	(Philippines) Malvar	China Coast Guard regular patrols. It is also under the control of Vietnam, near Vietnam-occupied Petley Reef	0	0
Eldad Reef	(Vietnam) Đá Ken Nan	China Coast Guard regular patrols. It is also under the control of Vietnam, near Vietnam-occupied Petley Reef	0	0
First Thomas Shoal	(China) 信义礁 Xinyi Jiao (Taiwan) 信義暗沙 Xinyi Ansha	China Coast Guard regular patrol 9°20′N 115°57′E - SE of Mischief Reef A few rocks are permanently above sea level. Much of the reef is above water at low tide. Encloses a lagoon.	0	0
First Thomas Shoal	(Philippines) Bulig	China Coast Guard regular patrol 9°20′N 115°57′E - SE of Mischief Reef A few rocks are permanently above sea level. Much of the reef is above water at low tide. Encloses a lagoon.	0	0
First Thomas Shoal	(Vietnam) Bãi Suối Ngà	China Coast Guard regular patrol 9°20′N 115°57′E - SE of Mischief Reef A few rocks are permanently above sea level. Much of the reef is above water at low tide. Encloses a lagoon.	0	0
Whitson Reef	(China) 牛轭礁 Niu'e Jiao (Taiwan) 牛軛礁	China Coast Guard regular patrol Part of Union Banks. Some rocks naturally above water at high tide. Part of Union Banks. It is also under the control of Vietnam, near Vietnam-occupied Grierson Reef	0	0
Whitson Reef	(Philippines) Julian Felipe	China Coast Guard regular patrol Part of Union Banks. Some rocks naturally above water at high tide. Part of Union Banks. It is also under the control of Vietnam, near Vietnam-occupied Grierson Reef	0	0
Whitson Reef	(Vietnam) Đá Ba Đầu	China Coast Guard regular patrol Part of Union Banks. Some rocks naturally above water at high tide. Part of Union Banks. It is also under the control of Vietnam, near Vietnam-occupied Grierson Reef	0	0

=== Unoccupied but largely controlled by Malaysia ===
Unoccupied but largely controlled by Malaysia
Malaysia claims a portion of the South China Sea together with 11 islands and other marine features in the Spratly group on the basis that they are within its continental shelf. These shoals lie off the North-Western coast of Sarawak over an area of 100 km; as such, they are largely controlled by Malaysia.
Int'l Name	Local Names	Description	Sea area	Land area
North Luconia Shoals	(China) 北康暗沙 Beikang Ansha	Friendship Shoal (Chinese: 盟谊暗沙), Hardie Reef (Chinese: 海康暗沙), Aitken Reef (Chinese: 义净礁), Buck Reef (Chinese: 法显暗沙), Moody Reef (Chinese: 康西暗沙), Seahorse Breakers (Chinese: 南安礁), Tripp Reef (Chinese: 北安礁), Hayes Reef (Chinese: 南屏礁)	1,400 square kilometres (540 sq mi)	0
North Luconia Shoals	(Malaysia) Gugusan Beting Raja Jarum	Friendship Shoal (Chinese: 盟谊暗沙), Hardie Reef (Chinese: 海康暗沙), Aitken Reef (Chinese: 义净礁), Buck Reef (Chinese: 法显暗沙), Moody Reef (Chinese: 康西暗沙), Seahorse Breakers (Chinese: 南安礁), Tripp Reef (Chinese: 北安礁), Hayes Reef (Chinese: 南屏礁)	1,400 square kilometres (540 sq mi)	0
South Luconia Shoals	(China) 南康暗沙 Nankang Ansha	Stigant Reef (Chinese: 海安礁), Connell Reef (Chinese: 隐波暗沙), Herald Reef (Spratly Islands) (Chinese: 海宁礁), Comus Shoal (Chinese: 欢乐暗沙), Richmond Reef (Chinese: 潭门礁), Luconia Breakers (Chinese: 琼台礁)	900 square kilometres (350 sq mi)	0
South Luconia Shoals	(Malaysia) Gugusan Beting Patinggi Ali	Stigant Reef (Chinese: 海安礁), Connell Reef (Chinese: 隐波暗沙), Herald Reef (Spratly Islands) (Chinese: 海宁礁), Comus Shoal (Chinese: 欢乐暗沙), Richmond Reef (Chinese: 潭门礁), Luconia Breakers (Chinese: 琼台礁)	900 square kilometres (350 sq mi)	0
James Shoal (Note: In January 2014, the PRC entered James Shoal unopposed.)	(China) 曾母暗沙 Zengmu Ansha	Shallowest natural depth is 17.5 m.	0	0
James Shoal	(Malaysia) Beting Serupai	Shallowest natural depth is 17.5 m.	0	0
Ardasier Bank	(China) 安渡滩 Andu Tan (Taiwan) 安渡灘	near (Malaysia)	0	0
Ardasier Bank	(Malaysia) ?	near (Malaysia)	0	0
Royal Charlotte Reef	(China) 皇路礁 Huanglu Jiao	near (Malaysia) , China Coast Guard regular patrol	0	0
Royal Charlotte Reef	(Malaysia) Terumbu Samarang Barat Besar	near (Malaysia) , China Coast Guard regular patrol	0	0

=== Unoccupied but largely controlled by the Philippines ===
Unoccupied but largely controlled by the Philippines
The reefs, shoals, etc. to the east of the 116°E meridian are closely guarded by the Philippine Coast Guard, Philippine Navy and Air Force. Though not occupied, the Philippines asserts control over these features which are less 100 miles (160 km) from the Palawan west coast (note: Scarborough Shoal is 100 miles (160 km) from Zambales west coast). There are many Filipino fishermen in this region, who cooperate closely with the Philippine Navy and Philippine Coast Guard. Non-Filipino fishermen are tolerated in this region, provided that they comply with Philippine laws. The press in the Philippines have reported many arrests of Chinese fishermen by the Philippine Navy and Philippine Coast Guard because of illegal fishing methods and catching of endangered sea species, both in this region and in the Sulu Sea. Philippine military presence in this region intensified after the 1995 Mischief Reef incident. The Philippine Air Force has been active in striking even the markers set up by other countries to guide the latter's naval forces in this region.
Int'l Name	Local Names	Description	Area (ha.)	Reclaimed area
Amy Douglas Bank / Reef	(Philippines) Del Rio	Lies north of Palawan Passage. Awash at low tide.	0	
Amy Douglas Bank / Reef	(China) 安塘滩 Antang Tan, 安塘礁 Antang Jiao	Lies north of Palawan Passage. Awash at low tide.	0	
Amy Douglas Bank / Reef	(Vietnam) Cụm Hồ Tràm	Lies north of Palawan Passage. Awash at low tide.	0	
Bombay Shoal	(Philippines) Abad Santos	9°26′N 116°55′E; Several rocks are exposed at low tide. Surrounds a lagoon.	0	
Bombay Shoal	(China) 蓬勃暗沙 Pengbo Ansha	9°26′N 116°55′E; Several rocks are exposed at low tide. Surrounds a lagoon.	0	
Bombay Shoal	(Vietnam) Bãi Cái Mép	9°26′N 116°55′E; Several rocks are exposed at low tide. Surrounds a lagoon.	0	
Boxall Reef	(Philippines) Rajah Sulayman	8°51′N 114°00′E; Above water only at low tide. No lagoon.	0	
Boxall Reef	(China) 牛车轮礁 Niuchelun Jiao	8°51′N 114°00′E; Above water only at low tide. No lagoon.	0	
Boxall Reef	(Vietnam) Đá Long Điền	8°51′N 114°00′E; Above water only at low tide. No lagoon.	0	
Carnatic Shoal	(Philippines) Sikatuna		0	
Carnatic Shoal	(China) 红石暗沙 Hongshi Ansha		0	
Carnatic Shoal	(Vietnam) Bãi Rạch Lấp		0	
Foulerton Reef	(Philippines) Magat Salamat		0	
Foulerton Reef	(China) 东华礁 Donghua Jiao		0	
Foulerton Reef	(Vietnam) Đá Chà Và		0	
Half Moon Shoal	(Philippines) Hasa-hasa	Several rocks on the eastern side rise one to two feet above high tide. Encloses a lagoon. Reports in February 2016 indicate the Philippine control of the reef might have ended.	0	
Half Moon Shoal	(China) 半月礁 Banyue Jiao	Several rocks on the eastern side rise one to two feet above high tide. Encloses a lagoon. Reports in February 2016 indicate the Philippine control of the reef might have ended.	0	
Half Moon Shoal	(Vietnam) Bãi Trăng Khuyết	Several rocks on the eastern side rise one to two feet above high tide. Encloses a lagoon. Reports in February 2016 indicate the Philippine control of the reef might have ended.	0	
Hardy Reef	(Philippines) Sakay	Naturally above water only at low tide. Surrounds a narrow strip of sand.	0	
Hardy Reef	(China) 半路礁 Banlu Jiao	Naturally above water only at low tide. Surrounds a narrow strip of sand.	0	
Hardy Reef	(Vietnam) Đá Phật Tự	Naturally above water only at low tide. Surrounds a narrow strip of sand.	0	
Hopkins Reef	(Philippines) Dumara		0	
Hopkins Reef	(China) 火星礁 Huoxing Jiao		0	
Hopkins Reef	(Vietnam) Đá Hợp Kim		0	
Investigator Northeast Shoal	(Philippines) Dalagang Bukid	Lies only a few miles west of Palawan. Naturally above water at low tide.	0	
Investigator Northeast Shoal	(China) 海口礁 Haikou Jiao	Lies only a few miles west of Palawan. Naturally above water at low tide.	0	
Investigator Northeast Shoal	(Vietnam) Bãi Phù Mỹ	Lies only a few miles west of Palawan. Naturally above water at low tide.	0	
Iroquois Reef	(Philippines) Rozul	Lies east of both Philippine-occupied Nanshan Island and Flat Island. Above water only at low tide.	0	
Iroquois Reef	(China) 鲎藤礁 Houteng Jiao	Lies east of both Philippine-occupied Nanshan Island and Flat Island. Above water only at low tide.	0	
Iroquois Reef	(Vietnam) Đá Khúc Giác	Lies east of both Philippine-occupied Nanshan Island and Flat Island. Above water only at low tide.	0	
Leslie Bank	(Philippines) Urduja		0	
Leslie Bank	(China) 勇士滩 Yongshi Tan		0	
Leslie Bank	(Vietnam) Bãi Vĩnh Tuy		0	
Lord Auckland Shoal	(Philippines) Lapu-Lapu	10°20′N 117°17′E	0	
Lord Auckland Shoal	(China) 莪兰暗沙 Elan Ansha	10°20′N 117°17′E	0	
Lord Auckland Shoal	(Vietnam) Bãi Na Khoai	10°20′N 117°17′E	0	
Pennsylvania North Reef	(Philippines) Del Pilar		0	
Pennsylvania North Reef	(China) 阳明礁 Yangming Jiao		0	
Pennsylvania North Reef	(Vietnam) Đá Gò Già		0	
Pennsylvania South Reef	(Philippines) Anota		0	
Pennsylvania South Reef	(China) 東坡礁 Dongpo Jiao		0	
Pennsylvania South Reef	(Vietnam)		0	
Reed Tablemount (including Nares Bank and Marie Louise Bank)	(Philippines) Recto	Shallowest natural depth is 9 m. About 2,500 square miles (6,500 km^{2}) in area. The Philippines occupied this feature in 1971 and a Philippine-Sweden joint oil-exploration followed afterwards. However, China protested this act of the Philippines saying that this tablemount which center lies 100 miles (160 km) from the Philippines is part of China's territories. After that, the Philippines tried asking China for a joint effort but China declined, arguing that the Philippines has no right in this feature. Presently, this feature is largely controlled by the Philippines.	0	
Reed Tablemount (including Nares Bank and Marie Louise Bank)	(China) 礼乐滩 Liyue Tan		0	
Reed Tablemount (including Nares Bank and Marie Louise Bank)	(Vietnam) Bãi Cỏ Rong		0	
Royal Captain Shoal	(Philippines) Kanduli	A few rocks are above water at low tide. Surrounds a lagoon.	0	
Royal Captain Shoal	(China) 舰长礁 Jianzhang Jiao	A few rocks are above water at low tide. Surrounds a lagoon.	0	
Royal Captain Shoal	(Vietnam) Bãi Đồi Mồi	A few rocks are above water at low tide. Surrounds a lagoon.	0	
Sabina Shoal	(Philippines) Escoda	It encloses two lagoons, naturally above water at low tide. Lies east of the Philippine-occupied Second Thomas Reef.	0	
Sabina Shoal	(China) 仙宾礁 Xianbin Jiao	It encloses two lagoons, naturally above water at low tide. Lies east of the Philippine-occupied Second Thomas Reef.	0	
Sabina Shoal	(Vietnam) Bãi Sa Bin (Bãi Chóp Mao)	It encloses two lagoons, naturally above water at low tide. Lies east of the Philippine-occupied Second Thomas Reef.	0	
Sandy Shoal	(Philippines) Mabuhangin		0	
Sandy Shoal	(China) 神仙暗沙 Shenxian Ansha		0	
Sandy Shoal	(Vietnam) Bãi Hữu Độ		0	
Seahorse Shoal / Seashore Shoal / Routh Bank	(Philippines) Baybayin Dagat	Lies north of Palawan Passage	0	
Seahorse Shoal / Seashore Shoal / Routh Bank	(China) 海马滩 Haima Tan	Lies north of Palawan Passage	0	
Seahorse Shoal / Seashore Shoal / Routh Bank	(Vietnam) Bãi Thạch Sa	Lies north of Palawan Passage	0	
Stag Shoal	(Philippines) Panday Pira		0	
Stag Shoal	(China) 隐遁暗沙 Yindun Ansha		0	
Southern Banks / Reef	(Philippines) Katimugan	A group of features located south of Reed Tablemount. The reef includes: Magat Salamat Reef, Toting, Hubo Reef, and Katimugan Banks/Reef. The area is largely controlled and used for fishing by the Philippines due to its proximity to Flat Island and Nanshan Island.	0	
Southern Banks / Reef	(China) 南方浅滩 Nanfang Qiantan	A group of features located south of Reed Tablemount. The reef includes: Magat Salamat Reef, Toting, Hubo Reef, and Katimugan Banks/Reef. The area is largely controlled and used for fishing by the Philippines due to its proximity to Flat Island and Nanshan Island.	0	
Southern Banks / Reef	(Vietnam) Bãi Nam	A group of features located south of Reed Tablemount. The reef includes: Magat Salamat Reef, Toting, Hubo Reef, and Katimugan Banks/Reef. The area is largely controlled and used for fishing by the Philippines due to its proximity to Flat Island and Nanshan Island.	0	
Templar Bank	(Philippines) Dalag		0	
Templar Bank	(China) 忠孝滩 Zhongxiao Tan		0	
Templar Bank	(Vietnam) Bãi Rạch Vang		0	

Unoccupied but largely controlled by the Philippines
The reefs, shoals, etc. to the west of the 116°E meridian
Int'l Name	Local Names	Description	Area (ha.)	Reclaimed area
Loaita Nan	(China) 双黄沙洲 Shuanghuang Shazhou (Taiwan) 雙黃沙洲	near (Philippines) Loaita Cay	0	0
Loaita Nan	(Philippines) Kota Magbanua	near (Philippines) Loaita Cay	0	0
Loaita Nan	(Vietnam) Bãi Loại Ta Nam	near (Philippines) Loaita Cay	0	0
North Reef (Spratly Islands)	(China) 贡士礁 Zhuying Jiao (Taiwan) 貢士礁	near (Philippines) Northeast Cay	0	0
North Reef (Spratly Islands)	(Philippines) Hilaga Peligro	near (Philippines) Northeast Cay	0	0
North Reef (Spratly Islands)	(Vietnam) Đá Bắc	near (Philippines) Northeast Cay	0	0
Sandy Cay (Spratly Islands)	(China) 铁线礁 Tiexiang Jiao (Taiwan) 鐵線礁	near (Philippines) Thitu Island	0	0
Sandy Cay (Spratly Islands)	(Philippines) Pag-asa Cay	near (Philippines) Thitu Island	0	0
Sandy Cay (Spratly Islands)	(Vietnam) Đá Hoài Ân	near (Philippines) Thitu Island	0	0
Thitu Reef	(China) 铁峙礁 Tiezhi Jiao (Taiwan) 鐵峙礁	near (Philippines) Thitu Island; Above water only at low tide. Located northeast of Thitu Island and unnamed on most maps. Part of Thitu Reefs	0	0
Thitu Reef	(Philippines) Pag-asa Reef	near (Philippines) Thitu Island; Above water only at low tide. Located northeast of Thitu Island and unnamed on most maps. Part of Thitu Reefs	0	0
Thitu Reef	(Vietnam) Đá Vĩnh Hảo	near (Philippines) Thitu Island; Above water only at low tide. Located northeast of Thitu Island and unnamed on most maps. Part of Thitu Reefs	0	0

=== Unoccupied but largely controlled by Vietnam ===
Unoccupied but largely controlled by Vietnam
Vietnam
Int'l Name	Local Names	Description	Area (ha.)	Reclaimed area
Loveless Reef	(China) 华礁 Hua Jiao (Taiwan) 華礁	near (Vietnam) Sin Cowe Island	0	0
Loveless Reef	(Philippines) Burunyugan 7	near (Vietnam) Sin Cowe Island	0	0
Loveless Reef	(Vietnam) Đá Nghĩa Hành	near (Vietnam) Sin Cowe Island	0	0
Jubilee Bank	(China) 朱应滩 Zhuying Tan (Taiwan) 朱應灘	near (Vietnam) Ladd Reef	0	0
Jubilee Bank	(Vietnam) Mỹ Hải (bãi ngầm)	near (Vietnam) Ladd Reef	0	0
Johnson Patch	(China) 常骏暗沙 Changjun Ansha (Taiwan) 常駿暗沙	near (Vietnam) Bombay Castle	0	0
Johnson Patch	(Vietnam) Bãi Vũng Mây (tức là)	near (Vietnam) Bombay Castle	0	0
Owen Shoal	(China) 奥援暗沙 Aoyuan Ansha	near (Vietnam) Bombay Castle; Shallowest natural depth is 6 m.	0	0
Owen Shoal	(Vietnam) Chim Biển (bãi ngầm)	near (Vietnam) Bombay Castle; Shallowest natural depth is 6 m.	0	0
Bittern Reef	(China) 石盘仔 Shípánzǐ	near (Vietnam) Pearson Reef	0	0
Bittern Reef	(Vietnam) Đá Núi Mon	near (Vietnam) Pearson Reef	0	0
Discovery Small Reef	(Vietnam) Đá Nhỏ	near (Vietnam) Discovery Great Reef	0	0
Discovery Small Reef	(Philippines) Burgos	near (Vietnam) Discovery Great Reef	0	0
Discovery Small Reef	(China) 小现礁 Xiǎoxiàn jiāo	near (Vietnam) Discovery Great Reef	0	0
Flora Temple Reef	(Vietnam) Đá Đền Cây Cỏ	near (Vietnam) Discovery Great Reef	0	0
Holiday Reef	(Vietnam) Đá Bãi Khung	near (Vietnam) Grierson Reef	0	0
Holiday Reef	(Philippines) Burunyugan 2	near (Vietnam) Grierson Reef	0	0
Holiday Reef	(China) 长线礁 Chángxiàn jiāo	near (Vietnam) Grierson Reef	0	0
Ross Reef	(China) 染青东礁 Rǎnqīng dōng jiāo	near (Vietnam) Grierson Reef	0	0
Ross Reef	(Philippines) Burunyugan 15	near (Vietnam) Grierson Reef	0	0
Ross Reef	(Vietnam) Đá An Bình	near (Vietnam) Grierson Reef	0	0
Higgens Reef	(China) 屈原礁 Qūyuán jiāo	near (Vietnam) Lansdowne Reef	0	0
Higgens Reef	(Philippines) Burunyugan 9	near (Vietnam) Lansdowne Reef	0	0
Higgens Reef	(Vietnam) Đá Phúc Sỹ	near (Vietnam) Lansdowne Reef	0	0
Gent Reef	(China) 吉阳礁 Jíyáng jiāo	near (Vietnam) SinCowe Island	0	0
Gent Reef	(Philippines) Burunyugan 6	near (Vietnam) SinCowe Island	0	0
Gent Reef	(Vietnam) Đá Sơn Hà	near (Vietnam) SinCowe Island	0	0
Bamford Reef	(China) 龙虾礁 Lóngxiā jiāo	near (Vietnam) Grierson Reef	0	
Bamford Reef	(Philippines) Burunyugan 13	near (Vietnam) Grierson Reef	0	
Bamford Reef	(Vietnam) Đá Vị Khê	near (Vietnam) Grierson Reef	0	
Whitsun Reef	(China) 牛轭礁 Niú è jiāo	near Grierson Reef, Vietnam Coast guard from Grierson Reef still patrols Whitsun Reef regularly Disputes with China	0	0
Whitsun Reef	(Philippines) Julian Felipe	near Grierson Reef, Vietnam Coast guard from Grierson Reef still patrols Whitsun Reef regularly Disputes with China	0	0
Whitsun Reef	(Vietnam) Đá Ba Đầu	near Grierson Reef, Vietnam Coast guard from Grierson Reef still patrols Whitsun Reef regularly Disputes with China	0	0
Eldad Reef	(China) 安达礁 Āndá jiāo	near Petley Reef, Vietnam Coast guard from Sand Cay (敦謙沙洲, đảo Sơn Ca) still patrols Reef regularly Disputes with China and Taiwan	0	0
Eldad Reef	(Philippines) Malvar	near Petley Reef, Vietnam Coast guard from Sand Cay (敦謙沙洲, đảo Sơn Ca) still patrols Reef regularly Disputes with China and Taiwan	0	0
Eldad Reef	(Vietnam) Đá Én Đất	near Petley Reef, Vietnam Coast guard from Sand Cay (敦謙沙洲, đảo Sơn Ca) still patrols Reef regularly Disputes with China and Taiwan	0	0

=== Unoccupied features ===
Not Occupied by any Country
These are the unoccupied features. Some sources say that some of these features are occupied by Vietnam or China, but most sources say that they are not occupied. "Occupation" is possibly confused because the said reefs are very close to other occupied features. There are many unoccupied features in the Spratly chain. The current Code of Conduct prohibits any country from acquiring new features. Many of these features are actually in between and/or near two or more occupied features of different countries. Thus, they serve like buffer zones. Example of this is Jones Reef which lies almost exactly between PRC-occupied Hughes Reef and Vietnamese-occupied Higgens Reef.
Int'l Name	Local Names	Description	Area (ha.)
Alicia Annie Reef	(Philippines) Arellano	09°25′N 115°26′E; A sand "cay", 1.2 m high. Many rocks above high tide line. Reef encloses a lagoon.	0
Alicia Annie Reef	(China) 仙娥礁 Xian'e Jiao	09°25′N 115°26′E; A sand "cay", 1.2 m high. Many rocks above high tide line. Reef encloses a lagoon.	0
Alicia Annie Reef	(Vietnam) Đá Suối Ngọc	09°25′N 115°26′E; A sand "cay", 1.2 m high. Many rocks above high tide line. Reef encloses a lagoon.	0
Coronation Bank	(China) 康泰滩 Kangtai Tan		0
Deane Reef	(Philippines) Macapagal	Part of Jackson Atoll.	0
Deane Reef	(China) 五方西礁 Wufangxi Jiao	Part of Jackson Atoll.	0
Deane Reef	(Vietnam) Đá Ninh Cơ	Part of Jackson Atoll.	0
Dickinson Reef	(Philippines) Aguinaldo	Part of Jackson Atoll.	0
Dickinson Reef	(China) 五方头礁 Wufangtou Jiao	Part of Jackson Atoll.	0
Dickinson Reef	(Vietnam) Đá Triêm Đức	Part of Jackson Atoll.	0
Discovery Small Reef	(Philippines) Silangang Paredes	Above water only at low tide.	0
Discovery Small Reef	(China) 小现礁 Xiaoxian Jiao	Above water only at low tide.	0
Discovery Small Reef	(Vietnam) Đá Nhỏ	Above water only at low tide.	0
Director Reef / Shoal	(Philippines) Tamban		0
Director Reef / Shoal	(China) 指向礁 Zhixiang Jiao		0
Dhaulle Shoal	(China) 逍遥暗沙 Xiaoyao Ansha		0
Dhaulle Shoal	(Vietnam) Bãi Nguyệt Sương		0
Ganges Reef	(Philippines) Palma		0
Ganges Reef	(China) 恒礁 Heng Jiao		0
Glasgow Bank	(China) 双礁 Shuang Jiao	8°28′N 115°30′E; Some sources say this area is occupied by the Philippines due to its proximity to the Commodore Reef.	0
Glasgow Bank	(Vietnam) Bãi ngầm Tam Thanh	8°28′N 115°30′E; Some sources say this area is occupied by the Philippines due to its proximity to the Commodore Reef.	0
Hampson Reef	(Philippines) Garcia	Part of Jackson Atoll.	0
Hampson Reef	(China) 五方尾礁 Wufangwei Jiao	Part of Jackson Atoll.	0
Hampson Reef	(Vietnam) Đá Hội Đức	Part of Jackson Atoll.	0
Hoare Reef	(Philippines) Laurel	Part of Jackson Atoll.	0
Hoare Reef	(China) 五方北礁 Wufangbei Jiao	Part of Jackson Atoll.	0
Hoare Reef	(Vietnam) Đá Hoa	Part of Jackson Atoll.	0
Hopps Reef	(Philippines) Diego Silang	Above water only at low tide. Part of Southampton Reefs.	0
Hopps Reef	(China) 禄沙礁 Lusha Jiao	Above water only at low tide. Part of Southampton Reefs.	0
Hopps Reef	(Vietnam) Đá Lục Giang	Above water only at low tide. Part of Southampton Reefs.	0
Jones Reef	(Philippines) Burunyugan 10	Lies 5 miles (8 km) south of McKennan Reef. Small reef, partly above water only at low tide. Part of Union Banks.	0
Jones Reef	(China) 漳溪礁 Zhangxi Jiao	Lies 5 miles (8 km) south of McKennan Reef. Small reef, partly above water only at low tide. Part of Union Banks.	0
Jones Reef	(Vietnam) Đá Văn Nguyên	Lies 5 miles (8 km) south of McKennan Reef. Small reef, partly above water only at low tide. Part of Union Banks.	0
Livock Reef	(Philippines) (NE part) Jacinto	Above water only at low tide. Some rocks still visible at high tide. Part of Southampton Reefs.	0
Livock Reef	(Philippines) (SW part) Bonifacio	Above water only at low tide. Some rocks still visible at high tide. Part of Southampton Reefs.	0
Livock Reef	(China) 三角礁 Sanjiao Jiao	Above water only at low tide. Some rocks still visible at high tide. Part of Southampton Reefs.	0
Livock Reef	(Vietnam) Đá Long Hải	Above water only at low tide. Some rocks still visible at high tide. Part of Southampton Reefs.	0
Lys Shoal	(Philippines) Bisugo		0
Lys Shoal	(China) 乐斯暗沙 Lesi Ansha		0
Lys Shoal	(Vietnam) Bãi Núi Cầu		0
Menzies Reef	(Philippines) Rajah Lakandula	Awash at low tide. Part of Loaita Bank.	0
Menzies Reef	(China) 蒙自礁 Mengzi Jiao	Awash at low tide. Part of Loaita Bank.	0
Menzies Reef	(Vietnam) Đá An Lão	Awash at low tide. Part of Loaita Bank.	0
North East Shoal	(Philippines) Ponce	Lies only a few miles north of Commodore Reef. Above water only at low tide.	0
North East Shoal	(China) 校尉暗沙 Xiaowei Ansha	Lies only a few miles north of Commodore Reef. Above water only at low tide.	0
North East Shoal	(Vietnam) Bãi Ngũ Phụng	Lies only a few miles north of Commodore Reef. Above water only at low tide.	0
North Viper Shoal	(Philippines) Maya-maya		0
North Viper Shoal	(China) 都护暗沙 Duhu Ansha		0
Petch Reef	(Philippines) Aquino	Part of Jackson Atoll.	0
Petch Reef	(China) 五方南礁 Wufangnan Jiao	Part of Jackson Atoll.	0
Petch Reef	(Vietnam) Đá Định Tường	Part of Jackson Atoll.	0
South Viper Shoal	(Philippines) Tomas Claudio		0
South Viper Shoal	(China) 保卫暗沙 Baowei Ansha		0
Third Thomas Shoal	(Philippines) Payao		0
Third Thomas Shoal	(China) 和平暗沙 Heping Ansha		0
Third Thomas Shoal	(Vietnam) Bãi Đồng Cam		0
Trident Shoal	(Philippines) Tatlong-tulis		0
Trident Shoal	(China) 永登暗沙 Yongdeng Ansha		0
Trident Shoal	(Vietnam) Bãi Đinh Ba		0

=== Claimed features by country but occupied by other country ===
Claimed features by country but occupied by other country
The PRC, the ROC and Vietnam claim all of the Spratly Island Chain, including some features that are just 50 km from other countries like the Philippines and Malaysia. The Philippines, Malaysia and Brunei have claims on parts of the area. Here are the islands claimed but are not occupied by these three countries (flags refer to the country currently occupying the feature):
Philippines: Itu Aba Island (Taiwan) , Amboyna Cay (Vietnam) , Namyit Island (Vietnam) , Sand Cay (Vietnam) , Sin Cowe Island (Vietnam) , Sin Cowe East Island (Vietnam) , Southwest Cay (Vietnam) , Spratly Island Proper (Vietnam) , Pigeon Reef (Vietnam) , South Reef (Vietnam) , Ardasier Reef (Malaysia) , Erica Reef (Malaysia) , Investigator Shoal (Malaysia) , Mariveles Reef (Malaysia) , Swallow Reef/Island (Malaysia) , Mischief Reef (China) , Subi Reef (China) and all of features to the east of the 116°E meridian (unoccupied) (see Unoccupied but largely controlled by the Philippines subtable).
Malaysia: Amboyna Cay (Vietnam) , Barque Canada Reef (Vietnam) , Commodore Reef (Philippines) , Louisa Reef (Brunei) and Royal Charlotte Reef ( (China) unoccupied)
Brunei: Rifleman Bank (Vietnam) and Owen Shoal ( (Vietnam) uncertain)

=== Others ===
Baker Reef / Gongzhen Jiao	10°43.5′N 116°10′E Awash at low tide.
