= Thomas Shoal =

Thomas Shoal may refer to:

In the Spratly Islands

- First Thomas Shoal
- Second Thomas Shoal
- Third Thomas Shoal

In the United States

- Thomas Point Shoal, Chesapeake Bay, Maryland

The term may also relate to

- Dangerous Ground (South China Sea)
- Spratly Islands
