= Royal Captain Shoal =

Disputed atoll
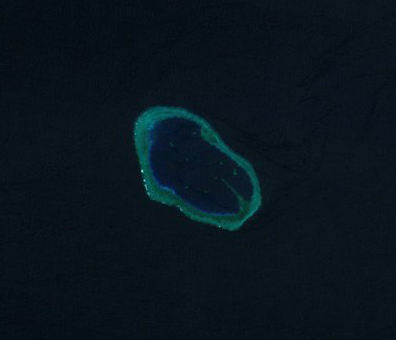
- Royal Captain Shoal

- Location within Spratly Islands
- Other names: Kanduli Shoal (Philippine English); Buhanginan ng Kanduli (Filipino) 艦長礁 / 舰长礁 Jiànzhǎng Jiāo (Chinese); Bãi Đồi Mồi (Vietnamese)

Geography
- Location: South China Sea
- Coordinates: 9°01′N 116°40′E
- Archipelago: Spratly Islands

Claimed by
- China
- Philippines
- Taiwan
- Vietnam

Royal Captain Shoal, also known as Kanduli Shoal (Filipino: Buhanginan ng Kanduli); Mandarin Chinese: 艦長礁/舰长礁; pinyin: Jiànzhǎng Jiāo; Vietnamese: Bãi Đồi Mồi, is an atoll in the South China Sea and a part of Spratly Islands. It is located in the vicinity of Northeast Investigator Shoal and Half Moon Shoal, at the eastern edge of the area named "Dangerous Ground".

== History and etymology ==
The atoll is named after the East India company ship Royal Captain that ran aground in the vicinity of this atoll in 1773. The ship was subsequently wrecked and lost.

In December 1773, Royal Captain was carrying Chinese merchandise (porcelain, tea, silk, glass and gold etc.) and a few passengers as made her journey from Canton, China to British port at Balambangan Island, situated in north of Sabah and to the west of Pulau Banggi. On 17 December, at half past two A.M., Royal Captain struck an unnamed island which was later called Royal Captain Shoal to mark the event. The ship was seriously damaged but the crew repaired it and got off. It struck again and wrecked in the sea of the west Palawan coast. All the passengers and all but three crew members were saved.

== Location and topography ==
Spread over an area of 8 square kilometres (3.1 sq mi), Royal Captain Shoal is centered at 9°01’N 116°40’E near the Palawan Passage. It is located 16 nautical miles (30 km; 18 mi) southeast of Northeast Investigator Shoal, and north of Half Moon Shoal. It lies off the coast of Palawan, Philippines and consists of a few rocks that are above water at low tide that surrounded a lagoon. The rocks in the atoll dry at 1.2 metres (3 ft 11 in). The lagoon has depths of up to 31 metres (102 ft) and contains a number of coral heads.

Named features in this atoll include Observation Rock (at the northern tip of the atoll) that shows at half tide. The atoll can only be entered at high water.
