= Prince of Wales Bank =

Reefs in the South China Sea

Disputed reef
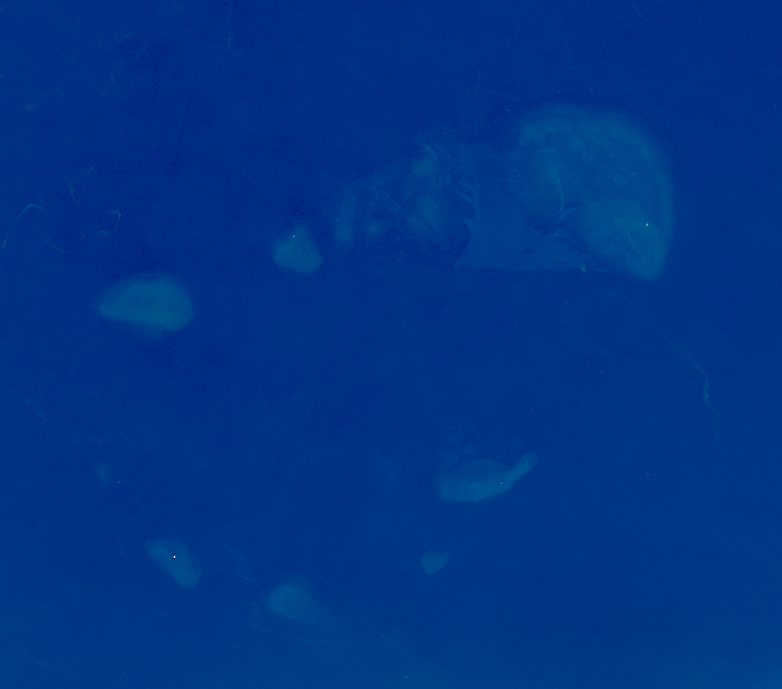
- Photo of Prince of Wales Bank

- Location within Spratly Islands
- Other names: Bãi Phúc Tần (Vietnamese) 广雅滩 Guǎngyǎ Tān (Chinese)

Geography
- Location: South China Sea
- Coordinates: 08°09′N 110°36′E
- Archipelago: Spratly Islands

Administration
- Vietnam
- Province: Bà Rịa–Vũng Tàu

Claimed by
- China
- Taiwan
- Vietnam

Prince of Wales Bank (Vietnamese: Bãi Phúc Tần; Mandarin Chinese: 广雅滩; pinyin: Guǎngyǎ Tān) is a group of submerged coral reefs southwest of the Spratly Islands in the South China Sea. It includes steel structures installed by Vietnamese authorities called DK1 platforms and assigned DK1 Battalion under the 2nd Regional Command to control and maintain the lighthouse.

== Geography ==
Prince of Wales Bank is a group of submerged coral reefs located in the southwest of the South China Sea, 200 nautical miles southeast of mainland Vietnam, 14 nautical miles north of Grainger Bank, and only 4 nautical miles northwest of Alexandra Bank.

The reef measures 20 km (12 mi) long along the northeast-southwest axis and 13 km (8.1 mi) wide along the northwest-southeast axis. The observed reef area is 37 km^{2} (14 sq mi), and the maritime area is 137 km^{2} (53 sq mi). The shallowest part of this beach is located to the west, with a depth of 7.3 meters.

== Infrastructure ==
=== Platforms ===
Vietnam has erected four steel structures called DK1 platforms. "DK" is the initial abbreviation of Dịch vụ - Khoa học kỹ thuật ("Service - Science and Technology"), while the number "1" refers to the platforms located in the outermost circle, furthest from the mainland. Although located on different shoals, the rigs are all called Phúc Tần rigs.

The steel structures were installed in 1989. Later, the drill house design was redesigned to be more spacious and robust, with a continuous structure based on the model of a deepwater drilling platform.

The current (2015) cluster has 4 platforms in use.

- DK1/2: Completed 18 August 1993.
- DK1/16: Completed 20 August 1996.
- DK1/17: Completed 23 August 1996.
- DK1/18: Completed 13 April 1997. This platform includes a lighthouse.

Currently, these platforms are controlled by garrison soldiers belonging to the DK1 Battalion, initially under Brigade 171 of the Vietnam People's Navy Region 2 Command, and later under the 2nd Regional Command. In the past, the first platform was the DK1/3 (Phúc Tần Drilling House), completed on 15 June 1989, but destroyed by a storm on the night of 4 December 1990, causing the death of three officers and soldiers.

=== Lighthouse ===
The Prince of Wales Bank Lighthouse was completed before 1994, the tower height is 23.4 meters and its effective range is 10 nautical miles by day and 12 nautical miles by night. White light flashing every 5 seconds.

== Territorial disputes ==
Vietnam argues that, pursuant to Article 60 of the 1982 United Nations Convention on the Law of the Sea (UNCLOS 1982) on artificial islands, installations and structures in the exclusive economic zone and Article 80 on artificial islands, installations and structures on the continental shelf, Vietnam has the exclusive right to construct, authorize and regulate the construction, exploitation and use of artificial islands, installations and structures for the purposes provided for in Article 56 of UNCLOS 1982 or other economic purposes in the exclusive economic zone and continental shelf. Vietnam declares that it does not intentionally turn the submerged banks in the southern continental shelf of the country [including Phuc Tan Bank] into islands and does not attribute them to the Truong Sa archipelago, and rejects this assignment.

In 1935, the Republic of China published the "Comparison of Chinese and British Names of the Islands in the South China Sea", which transliterated the English name Prince of Wales Bank into Chinese as 比鄰教畏灘 (Bilin Jiaowei Bank). In 1947, the Ministry of the Interior of the Republic of China changed the Chinese name of this bank to 廣雅灘 (Guangya Bank). The name Guangya was continued to be recognized and used by the People's Republic of China (China) since 1983. China considers Fuqin Bank as part of the Nansha Islands, and at the same time considers the Nansha Islands as an indivisible part of China's territory.

Unlike islands, submerged features are not subject to separate sovereignty claims by states, unless they can be proven to be located within historic waters or within the exclusive economic zone of another feature. The continental shelf is not part of the national territory, in other words, the coastal state does not have sovereignty over the continental shelf. According to Article 77 of UNCLOS 1982, the coastal state only exercises sovereign rights in terms of exploration and exploitation of its natural resources. The exercise of sovereign rights by the coastal state must not cause damage to navigation or other rights and freedoms of other states recognized by UNCLOS. According to Article 79 of UNCLOS 1982, other states have the right to lay submarine cables and pipelines on the continental shelf but must obtain the consent of the coastal state.

== See also ==
- List of maritime features in the Spratly Islands
