= Vanguard Bank =

Coral reefs in the South China Sea

Disputed reef
- Other names: Bãi Tư Chính (Vietnamese) 万安滩 Wàn'ān Tān (Chinese)

Geography
- Location: South China Sea
- Coordinates: 07°31′45″N 109°44′40″E
- Archipelago: Spratly Islands

Administration
- Vietnam
- Province: Bà Rịa–Vũng Tàu

Claimed by
- China
- Taiwan
- Vietnam

Vanguard Bank (Vietnamese: Bãi Tư Chính, bãi cạn Tư Chính or bãi ngầm Tư Chính; Chinese: 万安滩; pinyin: Wàn'ān tān) is a group of submerged coral reefs southwest of the Spratly Islands in the South China Sea. It includes steel structures installed by Vietnamese authorities called DK1 platforms and assigned DK1 Battalion under the 2nd Regional Command to control and maintain the lighthouse.

== Geography ==
Vanguard Bank is located approximately 160 nautical miles from the coast of Vung Tau, mainland Vietnam, and more than 600 nautical miles from China's Hainan Island.

The reef complex measures roughly 63 kilometers in length and 11 kilometers in width, featuring an observable reef flat area of 33.88 square kilometers. The shallowest section is located at its northern tip, reaching a minimum depth of 16 meters.

== Infrastructure ==
=== The DK1 Platforms ===
Vanguard Bank was originally placed under the jurisdiction of the Con Dao Special Zone, Ho Chi Minh City. Vietnam began installing steel-framed structures known as DK1 platforms in 1989. Over time, subsequent platform designs were modified to be more spacious and structurally robust, featuring an interconnected framework modeled after deep-water drilling rigs. Three platforms are currently operational on the bank:

- Platform DK1/11 (also referred to as Tu Chinh C or Tu Chinh 3): Completed on May 5, 1994.
- Platform DK1/12 (also referred to as Tu Chinh D or Tu Chinh 4): Completed on August 8, 1994.
- Platform DK1/14 (also referred to as Tu Chinh E or Tu Chinh 5): Completed on April 20, 1995.

Garrisoned personnel belong to the DK1 Battalion. This unit originally operated under the 171st Brigade of the Vietnam People's Navy before being reassigned under the direct command of 2nd Regional Command.

=== Lighthouses ===
Two operational lighthouses are located at Vanguard Bank. Both structures feature a tower height of 22 meters, a luminous range of 12 nautical miles and emit a white light. One lighthouse exhibits a group flashing 2 pattern with a 13-second period, while the other exhibits a group flashing 3 pattern with an 8-second period.

== Territorial disputes ==
=== Claimants ===
==== Vietnam ====
Vietnam argues that, pursuant to Article 60 of the 1982 United Nations Convention on the Law of the Sea (UNCLOS 1982) on artificial islands, installations and structures in the exclusive economic zone and Article 80 on artificial islands, installations and structures on the continental shelf, Vietnam has the exclusive right to construct, authorize and regulate the construction, exploitation and use of artificial islands, installations and structures for the purposes provided for in Article 56 of UNCLOS 1982 or other economic purposes in the exclusive economic zone and continental shelf. Vietnam declares that it does not intentionally turn the submerged banks in the southern continental shelf of the country [including Vanguard Bank] into islands, does not attribute them to the Truong Sa archipelago and rejects this assignment.

==== China ====
In 1935, the Republic of China published the "Comparison of Chinese and British Names of the Islands in the South China Sea", which transliterated the English name Vanguard Bank into Chinese as 前衛灘 (Qianwei Bank). In 1947, the Ministry of the Interior of the Republic of China changed the Chinese name of this bank to 萬安灘 (Wan'an Bank). The name Wan'an was continued to be recognized and used by the People's Republic of China (China) since 1983. China considers Vanguard Bank as part of the Nansha Islands, and at the same time considers the Nansha Islands as an indivisible part of China's territory.

=== International legal context ===
Unlike islands, submerged features are not subject to separate sovereignty claims by states, unless they can be proven to be located within historic waters or within the exclusive economic zone of another feature.

The continental shelf is not part of the national territory, in other words, the coastal state does not have sovereignty over the continental shelf. According to Article 77 of UNCLOS 1982, the coastal state only exercises sovereign rights in terms of exploration and exploitation of its natural resources. The exercise of sovereign rights by the coastal state must not cause damage to navigation or other rights and freedoms of other states recognized by UNCLOS. According to Article 79 of UNCLOS 1982, other states have the right to lay submarine cables and pipelines on the continental shelf but must obtain the consent of the coastal state.

== See also ==
- List of maritime features in the Spratly Islands
