= Half Moon Shoal =

Atoll in the South China Sea

Disputed atoll
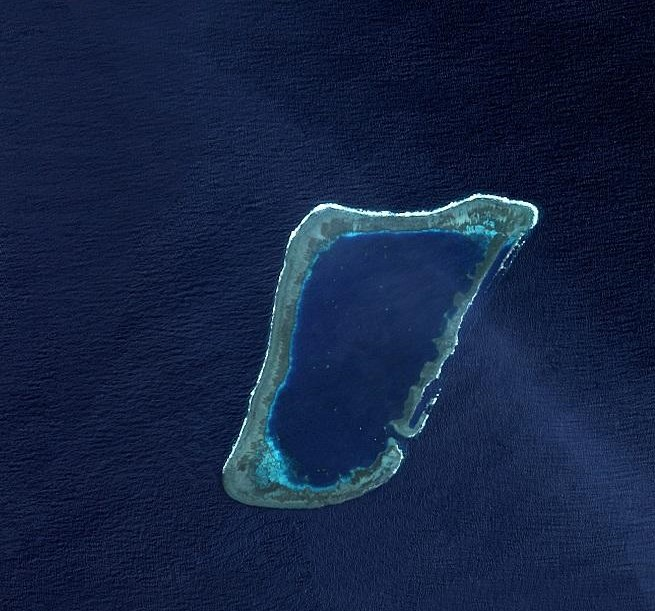
- Half Moon Shoal

- Location within Spratly Islands
- Other names: Bànyuè Jiāo 半月礁 (Chinese); Buhanginan ng Hasa Hasa (Filipino); Hasa Hasa Shoal (Philippine English)

Geography
- Location: South China Sea
- Coordinates: 8°52′N 116°16′E
- Archipelago: Spratly Islands

Claimed by
- China
- Philippines
- Taiwan
- Vietnam

Half Moon Shoal, also known as Bànyuè Jiāo (Chinese: 半月礁) and Hasa Hasa Shoal (Filipino: Buhanginan ng Hasa Hasa), is an atoll at the eastern edge of the Spratly Islands of the South China Sea. China, the Philippines, Taiwan (ROC) and Vietnam have competing claims over the atoll. It is located close to Northeast Investigator Shoal and 100 kilometres (62 mi) from Palawan, Philippines.

== Notable incidents ==
The Chinese frigate Dongguan accidentally ran aground on the shoal during a routine patrol mission on 11 July 2012. It was later towed away by a Chinese salvage ship.

On 6 May 2014, Philippine police arrested 11 Chinese fishermen allegedly poaching sea turtles on board the fishing boat, Qiongqionghai, near the Half Moon Shoal.

On 29 August 2018, BRP Gregorio del Pillar ran aground at the shoal. It was eventually removed from the shoal a few days later.
