= Western Reef =

Reef in the South China Sea

Disputed reef
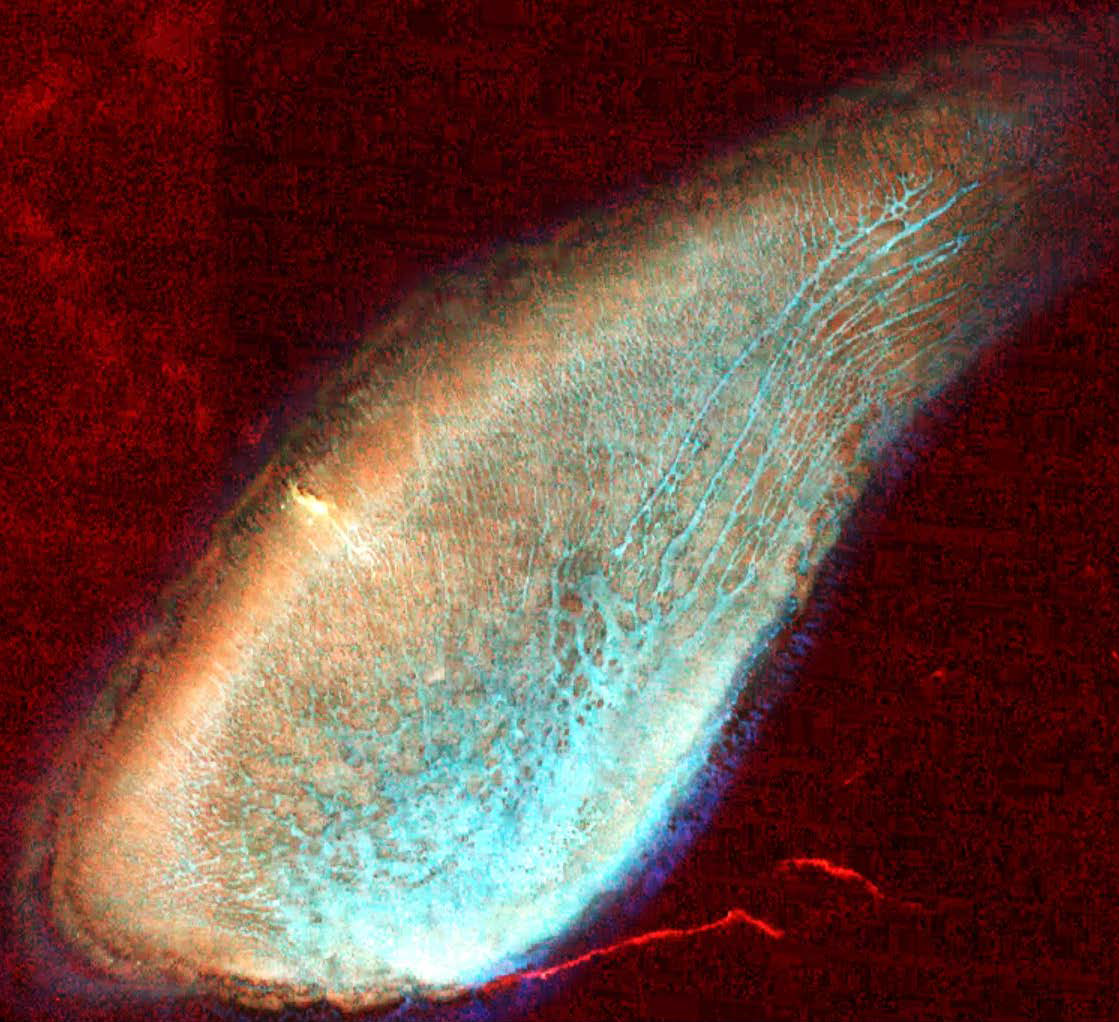
- Western Reef

- Other names: Đá Đền Cây Cỏ (Vietnamese) 福祿寺礁 / 福禄寺礁 Fúlùsì Jiāo (Chinese)

Geography
- Location: South China Sea
- Coordinates: 10.2667°N 113.6167°E
- Archipelago: Spratly Islands

Claimed by
- China
- Philippines
- Taiwan
- Vietnam

Western Reef (Vietnamese: Đá Đền Cây Cỏ; Mandarin Chinese: 福祿寺礁 / 福禄寺礁; pinyin: Fúlùsì Jiāo) is a reef in the South China Sea, located 66.7 kilometres (41.4 mi) west of Gaven Reefs in the Spratly Islands.
