= Third Thomas Shoal =

Reef in the South China Sea

Disputed reef
- Location within Spratly Islands

Geography
- Location: South China Sea
- Coordinates: 10.91°N 115.91°E
- Archipelago: Spratly Islands

Claimed by
- China
- Philippines
- Taiwan
- Vietnam

Third Thomas Shoal, known as Payao Shoal in the Philippines, Bãi Đồng Cam in Vietnam, and 和平暗沙 in China, is a reef in the north-west of the Spratly Islands in the South China Sea. It is located 7.5 nautical miles (13.9 km; 8.6 mi) north of Flat island, and 73 nautical miles (135 km; 84 mi) north of Mischief Reef.

The reef is one of three martnamed after Thomas Gilbert, the captain of the Charlotte:

- First Thomas Shoal
09°19′N 115°56′E, South of the Second Thomas Shoal.
- Second Thomas Shoal
09°44′N 115°52′E, South East of Mischief Reef.
- Third Thomas Shoal
10°54′N 115°56′E, North East of Flat Island - some distance N of the Second Thomas Shoal.
