= First Thomas Shoal =

Uninhabited reef/atoll in the South China Sea

Disputed atoll
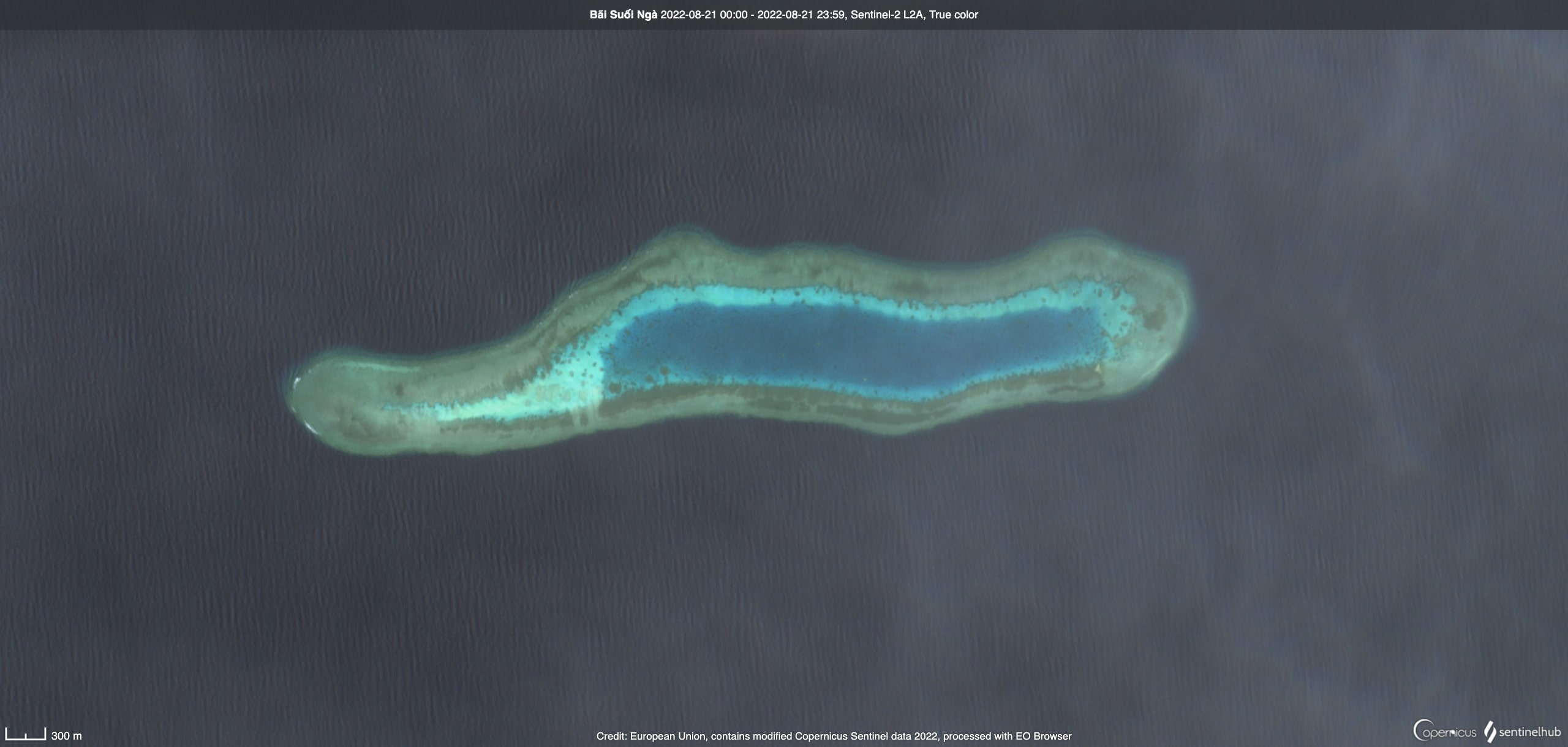
- First Thomas Shoal

Geography
- Location: South China Sea
- Coordinates: 9.33°N 115.93°E
- Archipelago: Spratly Islands

Claimed by
- China
- Philippines
- Taiwan
- Vietnam

First Thomas Shoal, also known as Bulig Shoal in the Philippines, Bãi Suối Ngà in Vietnam, and 信义礁 in China, is an uninhabited reef/atoll located 29 nautical miles (54 km; 33 mi) south of Second Thomas Shoal in the Spratly Islands of the South China Sea.

The shoal is one of three named after Thomas Gilbert, captain of the Charlotte:

- First Thomas Shoal
09°19′N 115°56′E, South of the Second Thomas Shoal.
- Second Thomas Shoal
09°44′N 115°52′E, South East of Mischief Reef.
- Third Thomas Shoal
10°54′N 115°56′E, North East of Flat Island - some distance North of the Second Thomas Shoal.
