= Northeast Investigator Shoal =

Shoal in the South China Sea

Disputed atoll
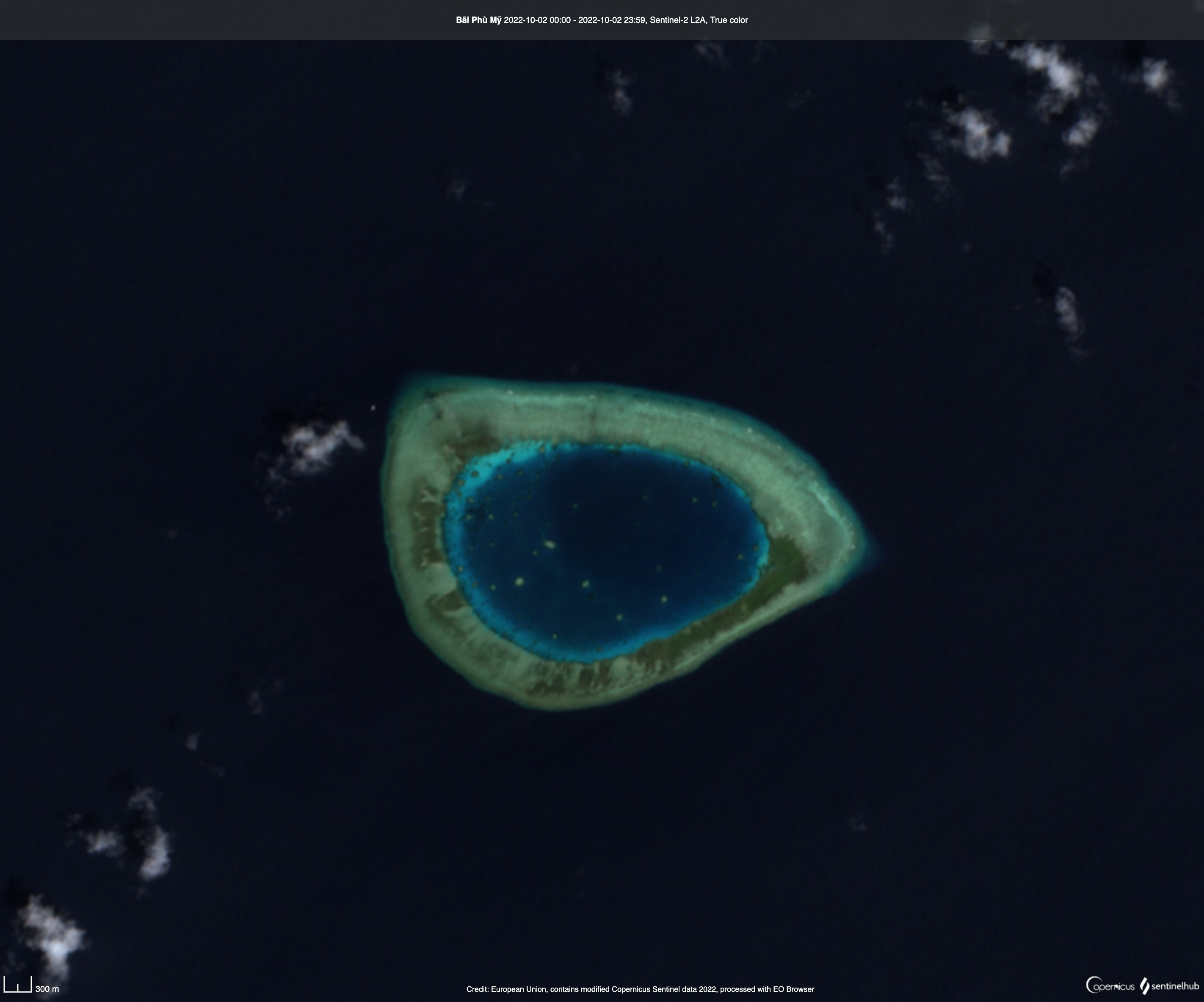

- Location within Spratly Islands
- Other names: Investigator Northeast Shoal; Dalagang Bukid Shoal (Philippine English); Buhanginan ng Dalagang Bukid (Filipino) 海口礁 Hǎikǒu Jiāo (Chinese); Bãi Phù Mỹ (Vietnamese)

Geography
- Location: South China Sea
- Coordinates: 9°10′N 116°28′E
- Archipelago: Spratly Islands

Claimed by
- China
- Philippines
- Taiwan
- Vietnam

Northeast Investigator Shoal, also known as Dalagang Bukid Shoal (Filipino: Buhanginan ng Dalagang Bukid, lit. 'Sandbank of the Field Maiden'); Mandarin Chinese: 海口礁; pinyin: Hǎikǒu Jiāo; Vietnamese: Bãi Phù Mỹ, also marked as Investigator Northeast Shoal on some nautical charts, is an atoll in the Spratly Islands in the South China Sea.

The submerged coral atoll is located 32 nautical miles (59 km; 37 mi) from Bombay Shoal at 09°10′N 116°28′E. A small feature with an area of just 2 square kilometres (0.77 sq mi), the atoll has a few rocks at its western edge that are just visible at high water.
