= South China Sea Islands =

Islands in the South China Sea

South China Sea Islands South China Sea Oceanic Islands
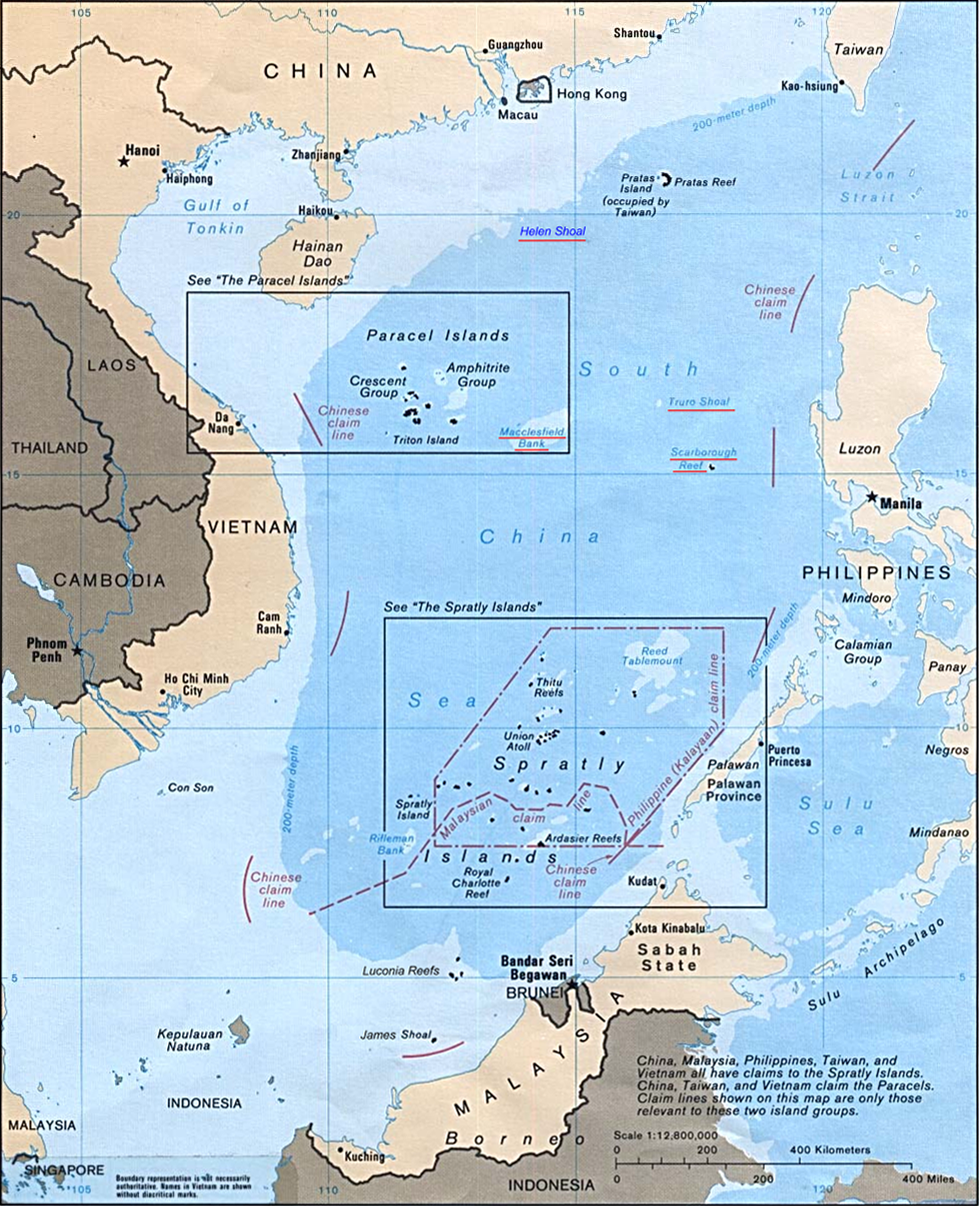
- Location of the South China Sea Islands

Ecology
- Realm: Indomalayan
- Biome: Tropical and subtropical moist broadleaf forests

Geography
- Area: 6 km^{2} (2.3 mi^{2})
- Countries: List: Disputed between Brunei; China; Malaysia; Philippines; Taiwan; Vietnam

Conservation
- Conservation status: Critical/endangered
- Protected: 0 km^{2} (0%)

The South China Sea Islands consist of over 250 islands, atolls, cays, shoals, reefs, and seamounts in the South China Sea. The islands are mostly low and small and have few inhabitants. The islands and surrounding seas are subject to overlapping territorial claims by the countries bordering the South China Sea.

The South China Sea Islands constitute a distinct tropical moist broadleaf forest terrestrial ecoregion and the South China Sea Oceanic Islands marine ecoregion.

== Geography ==
The islands, shoals and reefs are grouped into three archipelagos, plus the Zhongsha Islands (Macclesfield Bank and Scarborough Shoal). The South China Sea Islands as defined here consist of the sea's oceanic islands but do not include the sea's continental shelf islands (like Hainan and Natuna). Collectively, they have a total land surface area of less than 15 km^{2} (5.8 sq mi) at low tide. The island groups include:

- The Paracel Islands, disputed between the People's Republic of China (PRC), the Republic of China (ROC, a.k.a. Taiwan), and Vietnam. Occupied by the PRC following the Battle of the Paracel Islands (1974).
- Pratas Island and the Vereker Banks, disputed between the PRC and the ROC, occupied by the ROC.
- The Spratly Islands, disputed between the PRC, the ROC, and Vietnam (and to a lesser degree by Brunei, Malaysia, and the Philippines, claiming various parts of the archipelago).
  - James Shoal
  - Taiping Island
  - Zhongzhou Reef
- The Zhongsha Islands
  - Macclesfield Bank (with no land above sea level), disputed between the PRC, the ROC and the Philippines.
    - Walker Shoal
  - Scarborough Shoal (with only rocks above sea level), disputed between the PRC, the ROC, and the Philippines.
  - Truro Shoal (Sianfa Ansha or Shianfa Ansha 特魯暗沙; 16°20′N 116°44′E)

=== Geology ===
Location of the major islands in Spratly Islands. The eastern Dangerous Ground area contains many other reefs.
- Legend:
- Republic of China (Taiwan): 1: Taiping 2: Zhongzhou
- China: 3: Yongshu 4: Meiji 5: Zhubi 6: Huayang 7: Nanxun 8: Chiguo 9: Dongmen
- Philippines: 10: Flat Island 11: Lankiam Cay 12: Loaita Cay 13: Loaita Island 14: Nanshan Island 15: Northeast Cay 16: Thitu Island 17: West York Island 18: Commodore Reef 19: Irving Reef 20: Second Thomas Shoal
- Vietnam: 21: Southwest Cay 22: Sand Cay 23: Namyit Island 24: Sin Cowe Island 25: Spratly Island 26: Amboyna Cay 27: Grierson Reef 28: Central London Reef 29: Pearson Reef 30: Barque Canada Reef 31: West London Reef 32: Ladd Reef 33: Discovery Great Reef 34: Pigeon Reef 35: East London Reef 36: Alison Reef 37: Cornwallis South Reef 38: Petley Reef 39: South Reef 40: Collins Reef 41: Lansdowne Reef 42: Bombay Castle 43: Prince of Wales Bank 44: Vanguard Bank 45: Prince Consort Bank 46: Grainger Bank 47: Alexandra Bank 48: Orleana Shoal 49: Kingston Shoal
- Malaysia: 50: Swallow Reef 51: Ardasier Reef 52: Dallas Reef 53: Erica Reef 54: Investigator Shoal 55: Mariveles Reef
- Brunei: 56: Louisa Reef

The geology has been extensively studied because of exploitable resources such as oil and gas and is complex. The sea floor contains Paleozoic and Mesozoic granite and metamorphic rocks.

The islands are usually coral reefs of varying ages and formations. Some have been artificially extended. In the Spratly Islands Reed Tablemount is a very large guyot over 100 km (62 mi) across, which includes Reed Bank and Nares Bank in its geological structure. The second deepest blue hole (underwater sinkhole) in the world is in the Paracel Islands at Dragon Hole.

== Climate ==
The Paracel Islands have a tropical marine climate. Annual rainfall averages 1,130 mm (44 in), with strong seasonal variation. From May to August, the southwest trade winds bring rainfall to the islands, with the maximum rainfall in June (226 mm (8.9 in)). The northeast monsoon brings a dry season, with December receiving the least rainfall( about 3.3 mm (0.13 in)).

The Spratly Islands have a tropical climate. The average annual temperature is 27 °C (81 °F) and ranges from 30 °C (86 °F) between May and August to 25 °C (77 °F) during the winter months. Rainfall averages 1,800 to 2,200 mm (71 to 87 in) annually. The southwest monsoon from May to November brings a five-month rainy season, and the seven-month dry season includes the March to April southeast monsoon.

== Flora ==
Many of the smaller islands are devoid of vegetation. Larger islands support terrestrial plant communities which include coral island evergreen forest, scrub forest and coastal scrub and grasses.

There are 340 species of land plants and fungi recorded in the Paracel Islands, composed of 224 genera in 89 plant families. These include 312 species of flowering plants (angiosperms) and five species of pteridophytes (ferns and fern allies), along with 22 species of macrofungi (larger fungi) and one lichen species. The flora of the Paracel Islands is similar to that of Hainan Island to the north.

Humans have introduced other plants to the islands. The Chinese and Vietnamese introduced 47 more species, including peanut, sweet potato and various vegetables.

== Fauna ==
There are no known native terrestrial animals on the islands.

The islands are feeding and nesting sites for large numbers of seabirds, including the streaked shearwater (Calonectris leucomelas), brown booby (Sula leucogaster), red-footed booby (S. sula), great crested tern (Sterna bergii) and white tern (Gygis alba). Seabird faeces can accumulate 10 mm (0.39 in) to 1 m (3 ft 3 in) annually. Over time, they create thick deposits of guano.

Green sea turtles (Chelonia mydas) and hawksbill sea turtles (Eretmochelys imbricata) inhabit waters around the islands and nest on the islands' beaches.

== History ==
From 1405 to 1433, Zheng He commanded expeditionary voyages to Southeast Asia, South Asia, Western Asia, and East Africa in Ming dynasty in China. In 1421, Zheng prepared the 6 edition Mao Kun map, usually referred to by Chinese people as Zheng He's Navigation Map (simplified Chinese: 郑和航海图; traditional Chinese: 鄭和航海圖; pinyin: Zhèng Hé hánghǎi tú), which included South China Sea Islands.

In the 19th century, as a part of the occupation of Indochina, France claimed control of the Spratlys until the 1930s, exchanging a few with the British. During World War II, the South China Sea islands were all occupied by Japan. The People's Republic of China, founded in 1949, claimed the islands as part of the province of Canton (Guangdong), and later of the Hainan special administrative region.

=== Names ===
The South China Sea Islands were discussed from the 4th century BC in the Chinese texts Yizhoushu, Classic of Poetry, Zuo Zhuan, and Guoyu, but only implicitly as part of the "Southern Territories" (Chinese: 南州; pinyin: Nán Zhōu) or "South Sea" (南海, Nán Hǎi). During the Qin dynasty (221–206 BC), government administrators called the South China Sea Islands the "Three Mysterious Groups of Islands" (三神山, Sān Shén Shān). But during the Eastern Han dynasty (23–220), the South China Sea was renamed "Rising Sea" (漲海, Zhǎng Hǎi), so the islands were called the "Rising Sea Islands" (漲海崎头, Zhǎnghǎi Qítóu). During the Jin dynasty (266–420), they were known as the "Coral Islands" (珊瑚洲, Shānhú Zhōu). From the Tang dynasty (618–907) to the Qing dynasty (1644–1912), various names were used for the islands, but in general Changsha and permutations referred to the Paracel Islands, while Shitang referred to the Spratly Islands. These variations included, for the Paracels: Jiǔrǔ Luózhōu (九乳螺洲), Qīzhōu Yáng (七洲洋), Chángshā (长沙), Qiānlǐ Chángshā (千里长沙), and Qiānlǐ Shítáng (千里石塘); for the Spratlys: Shítáng (石塘), Shíchuáng (石床), Wànlǐ Shítáng (万里石塘), and Wànlǐ Chángshā (万里长沙).

During the Qing, the names Qianli Changsha and Wanli Shitang were in vogue, and Chinese fishermen from Hainan named specific islands from within the groups, although the Qing officially named 15 large islands in 1909. During China's Republican era (1912–1949), the government named the Spratlys Tuánshā Qúndǎo (团沙群岛) and then Nánshā Qúndǎo (南沙群岛); the Paracels were Xīshā Qúndǎo (西沙群岛); Republican authorities mapped over 291 islands, reefs, and banks in surveys in 1932, 1935, and 1947. The People's Republic of China has retained the Republican-era names for the island groups, supplementing them with a list of 287 names for islands, reefs, banks, and shoals in 1983. From 2011 to 2012, China's State Oceanic Administration named 1,660 nameless islands and islets under its claimed jurisdiction; in 2012, China announced plans to name a further 1,664 nameless features by August 2013. The naming campaign is intended to consolidate China's sovereignty claim over Sansha (三沙), a city which includes islands from the Xisha (Paracel), Nansha (Spratly and James Shoal) and Zhongsha (中沙, Zhōngshā; Macclesfield Bank, Scarborough Shoal, and others) groups.

== Resources ==
There are minerals, natural gas and oil deposits on the islands and under their nearby seafloor, also an abundance of sea life, such as fish, animals and vegetation, traditionally exploited as food by all the claimant nations for thousands of years—mostly without disputes that could risk war. In the 20th century, since the WW2 settlements failed to resolve ownership of such lesser areas of land, seas and islands—and because of the economic, military, and transportational importance—their control, especially that of the Spratlys, has been in dispute between China and several Southeast Asian countries, such as Vietnam, from the mid-20th century onwards. True occupation and control are shared between the claimants (see claims and control below).

== Claims and control ==
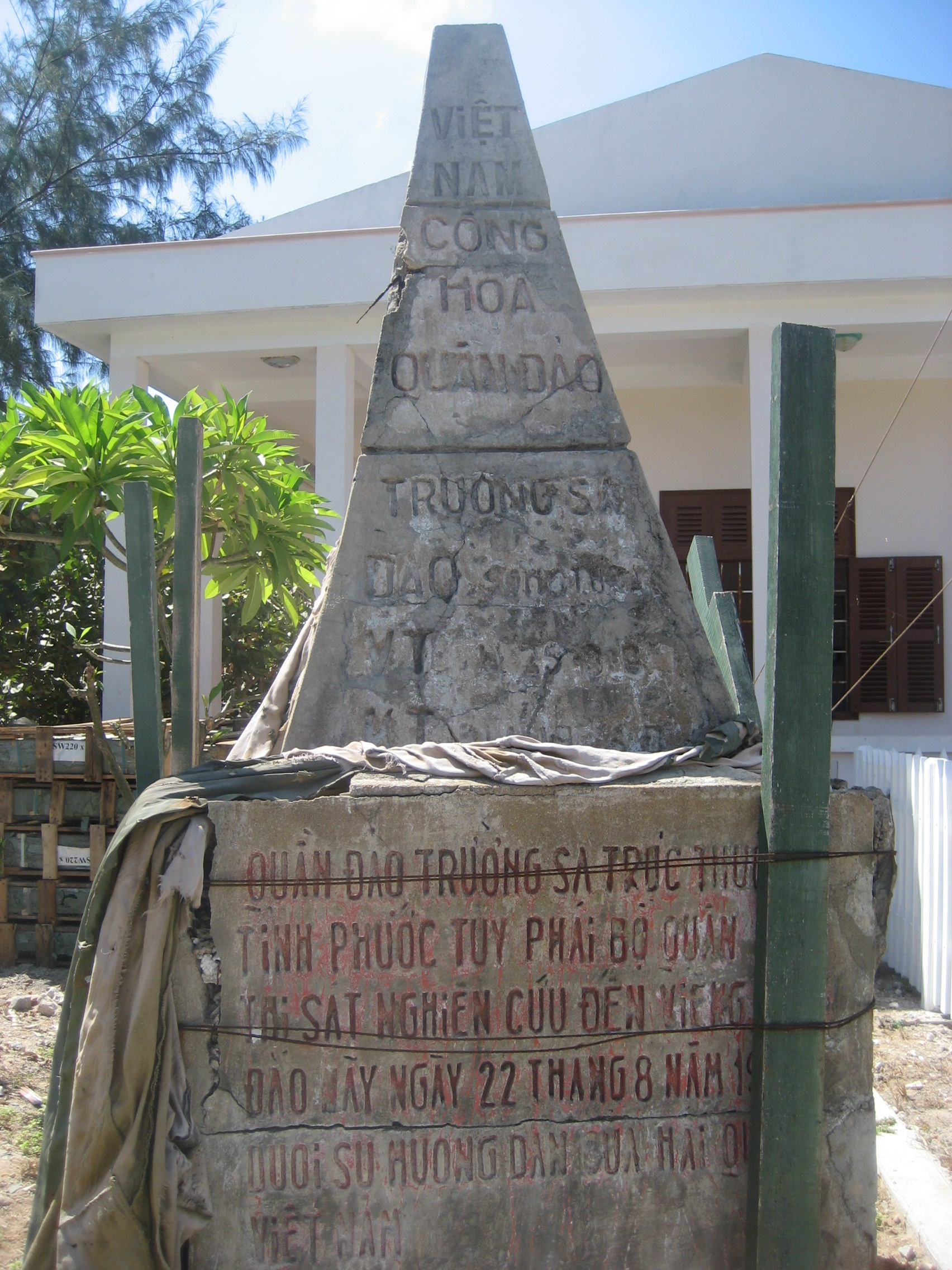
A monument of South Vietnam on Southwest Cay, Spratly Islands, claiming the cay as part of Vietnamese territory (to Phước Tuy Province). Used since 22 August 1956 until 1975, when replaced by another one from the Socialist Republic of Vietnam (previously North Vietnam, later as the successor state after the Fall of Saigon).

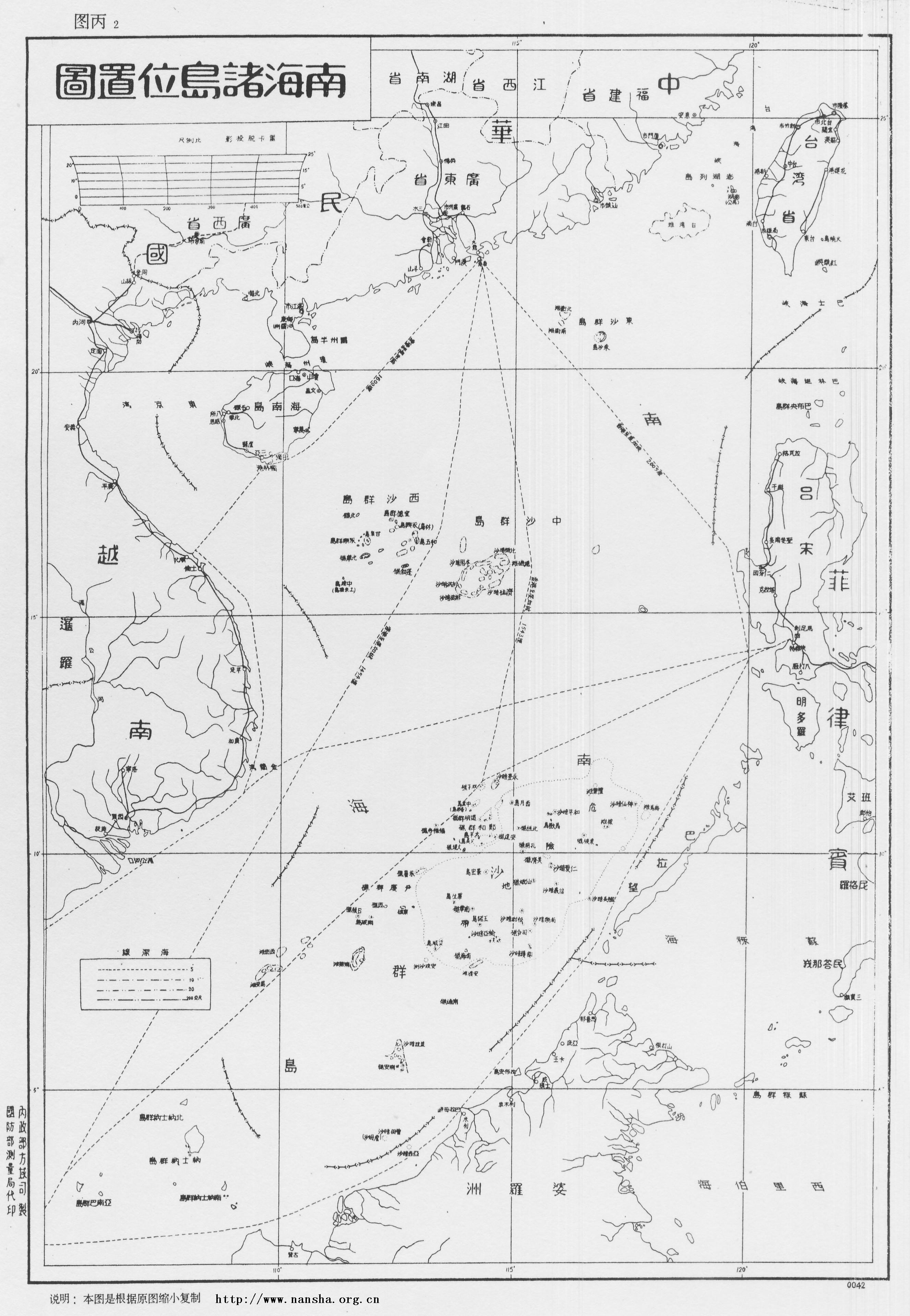
Map of South China Sea Islands, made by Territory Department of Ministry of the Interior, Republic of China in 1947, after its sovereignty transfer from the Japanese occupation.

The Republic of China (ROC) named 132 of the South China Sea Islands in 1932 and 1935. In 1933, the Chinese government lodged an official protest to the French government after its occupation of Taiping Island. In 1947, the Ministry of Interior of China renamed 149 of the islands. Later, in November 1947, the Secretaritat of Guangdong Government of China was authorised to publish the Map of the South China Sea Islands.

The Japanese and the French renounced their claims as soon as their respective occupations or colonization had ended.

In 1958, the People's Republic of China (PRC) issued a declaration defining its territorial waters within what is known as the nine-dash line which encompassed the Spratly Islands. North Vietnam's prime minister, Phạm Văn Đồng, sent a diplomatic note to Zhou Enlai, stating that "The Government of the Democratic Republic of Vietnam respects this decision." The diplomatic note was written on 14 September and was publicised in Nhan Dan newspaper (Vietnam) on 22 September 1958. Regarding this letter, there have been many arguments on its true meaning and the reason why Phạm Văn Đồng decided to send it to Zhou Enlai. In an interview with BBC Vietnam, Dr. Balázs Szalontai provided the following analysis of this issue:

The general context of the Chinese declaration was the United Nations Conference on the Law of the Sea, held in 1956, and the resulting treaties signed in 1958, such as the Convention on the Territorial Sea and Contiguous Zone. Understandably, the PRC government, though not being a member of the U.N., also wanted to have a say in how these issues were dealt with. Hence the Chinese declaration of September 1958. In these years, as I said before, North Vietnam could hardly afford to alienate China. The Soviet Union did not give any substantial support to Vietnamese reunification, and neither South Vietnamese leader Ngo Dinh Diem nor the U.S. government showed readiness to give consent to the holding of all-Vietnamese elections as stipulated by the Geneva Agreements. On the contrary, Diem did his best to suppress the Communist movement in the South. This is why Phạm Văn Đồng felt it necessary to take sides with China, whose tough attitude toward the Asian policies of the U.S. offered some hope. And yet he seems to have been cautious enough to make a statement that supported only the principle that China was entitled for 12-mile territorial seas along its territory but evaded the issue of defining this territory. While the preceding Chinese statement was very specific, enumerating all the islands (including the Paracels and the Spratlys) for which the PRC laid claim, the DRV statement did not say a word about the concrete territories to which this rule was applicable. Still, it is true that in this bilateral territorial dispute between Chinese and Vietnamese interests, the DRV standpoint, more in a diplomatic than a legal sense, was incomparably closer to that of China than to that of South Vietnam.

It was also argued that, Phạm Văn Đồng who represented North Vietnam at that time had no legal right to comment on a territorial part which belonged to the South Vietnam represented by Ngo Dinh Diem. Therefore, the letter has no legal value and is considered as a diplomatic document to show the support of the government of North Vietnam to the PRC at that time. In China, in 1959, the islands were put under an administrative office (办事处/banshichu). In 1988, the office was switched to the administration of the newly founded Hainan Province. The PRC strongly asserted its claims to the islands, but in the late 1990s, under the new security concept, the PRC put its claims less strongly. According to the Kyodo News, in March 2010 PRC officials told US officials that they consider the South China Sea a "core interest" on par with Taiwan, Tibet, and Xinjiang. In July 2010, the Communist Party-controlled Global Times stated that "China will never waive its right to protect its core interest with military means" and a Ministry of Defense spokesman said that "China has indisputable sovereignty of the South Sea and China has sufficient historical and legal backing" to underpin its claims. China added a tenth-dash line to the east of Taiwan island in 2013 as a part of its official sovereignty claim to the disputed territories in the South China Sea.

In addition to the People's Republic of China and Vietnam, the Republic of China (i.e. Taiwan), Malaysia, Brunei, and the Philippines also claim and occupy some islands. Taiwan claims all the Spratly Islands, but occupies only one island and one shelf, including Taiping Island. Malaysia occupies three islands on its continental shelf. The Philippines claim most of the Spratlys and calls them the Kalayaan Group of islands, and they form a distinct municipality in the province of Palawan. The Philippines, however, occupy only eight islands. Brunei claims a relatively small area, including islands on Louisa Reef.

Indonesia's claims are not on any island, but on maritime rights. (See South China Sea)

In July 2016, in Philippines v. China, the Permanent Court of Arbitration ruled in favor of the Philippines. It clarified that it would not "...rule on any question of sovereignty over land territory and would not delimit any maritime boundary between the Parties". The tribunal also ruled that China has "no historical rights" based on the "nine-dash line" map. China has rejected the ruling, as has Taiwan.

== See also ==
- Great Wall of Sand
- List of islands in the South China Sea
- List of islands of the Philippines
- List of islands of Taiwan
- List of islands of Vietnam
- List of maritime features in the Spratly Islands
