= List of islands in the South China Sea =

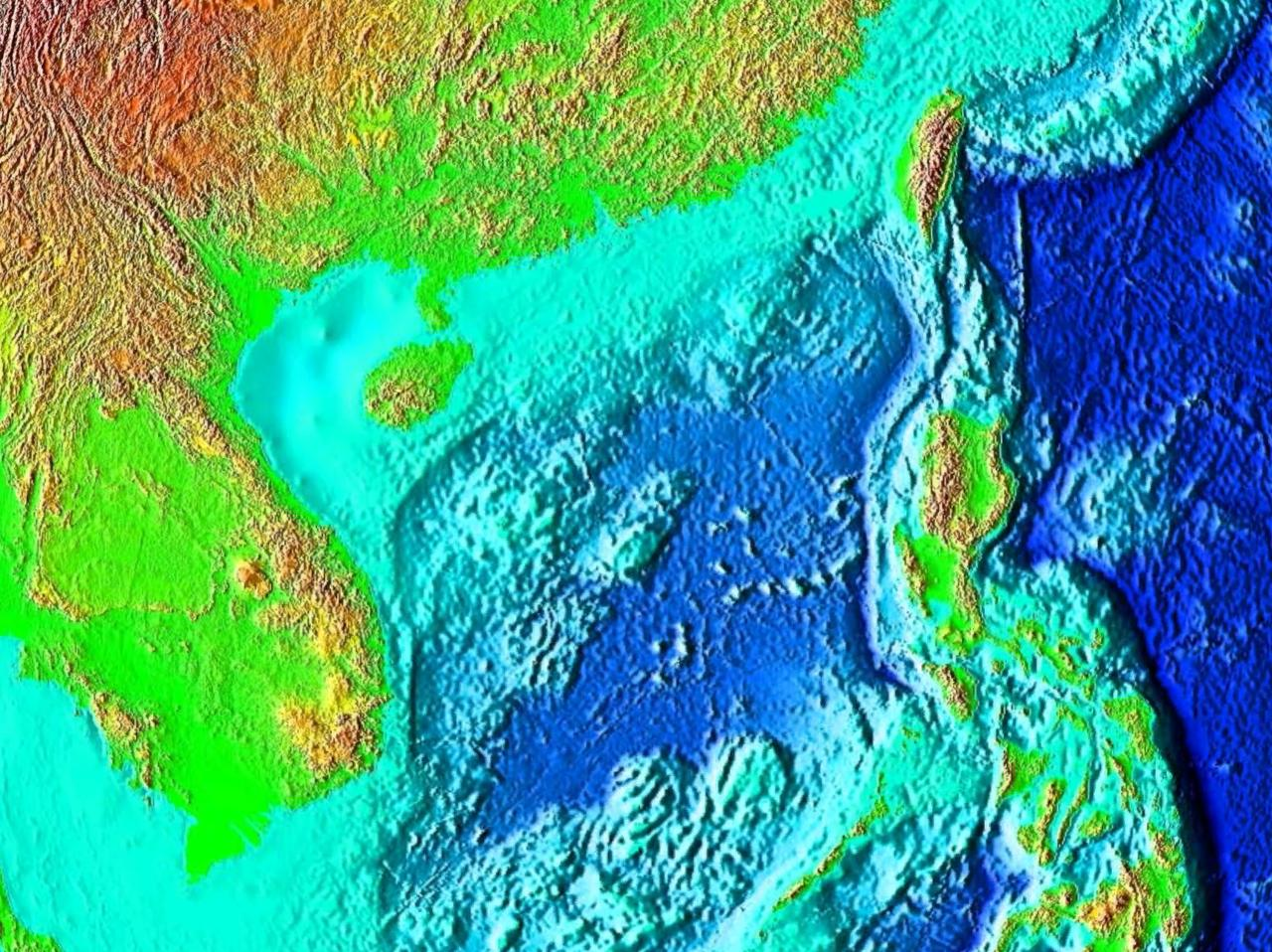
The South China Sea

Islands in the South China Sea includes the South China Sea Islands (Pratas Island, Paracel Islands and Macclesfield Bank), islands on the China coast, on the Vietnam coast, on the Borneo coast, and the peripheral islands of Taiwan, the Philippines, etc.

== South China Sea Islands ==
=== Pratas Island ===
Administered as part of Cijin District, Kaohsiung City, Taiwan, Republic of China

=== Disputed islands ===
==== Paracel Islands ====
The Paracel Islands are occupied by the People's Republic of China (PRC), and claimed by the PRC, the ROC (Taiwan), and Vietnam.

Amphitrite Group	Crescent Group	Ungrouped
Rocky Island; Tree Island; West Sand; Woody Island	Duncan Island; Money Island; Pattle Island; Robert Island; Yagong Island	Bombay Reef; Triton Island

==== Spratly Islands ====
The Spratly Islands were, in 1939, fourteen coral islets mostly inhabited by countless seabirds. According to a Chinese 1986 source, the Spratly Islands consist of 14 islands or islets, 6 banks, 113 submerged reefs, 35 underwater banks, 21 underwater shoals. For some reason, neither of these mention the 11th largest naturally occurring island located on the Swallow Reef atoll, occupied by Malaysia. The islands are all of a similar nature; they are cays (or keys) – sand islands formed on old degraded and submerged coral reefs.

Taiwan (ROC)	Philippines	Vietnam	Malaysia
Taiping Island / Itu Aba	Flat Island; Lankiam Cay; Loaita Island; Nanshan Island; Northeast Cay; Thitu Island; West York Island	Amboyna Cay; Namyit Island; Sin Cowe Island; Sin Cowe East Island; Spratly Island; Sand Cay; Southwest Cay	Swallow Reef

===== Reefs and artificial islands =====
Note that, according PRC, in the Spratly Islands area, the definition of "island" is applied very liberally to reefs and artificial islands. There are in fact only about a dozen islands with an area greater than 1 hectare.

Taiwan (ROC)	China (PRC)	Philippines	Vietnam	Malaysia	Brunei
Zhongzhou Reef	Cuarteron Reef; Fiery Cross Reef; Gaven Reefs; Hughes Reef; Johnson South Reef; Mischief Reef; Subi Reef	Commodore Reef; Half Moon Shoal; Irving Reef; Second Thomas Shoal	Bombay Castle; Collins Reef; Cornwallis South Reef; Ladd Reef; West London Reef	Ardasier Reef; Dallas Reef; Erica Reef; Investigator Shoal; Luconia Shoals; Mariveles Reef; Swallow Reef	Louisa Reef

==== Macclesfield Bank ====
There are no islands, nor any land above sea-level, in the Macclesfield Bank.

In conjunction with the Scarborough Shoal, which also contains no islands, the PRC refer to the combined area as the Zhongsha Islands, even though it contains no islands.

== Islands on the southern coast of China ==
=== Islands of Hainan ===
- Hainan
- Qizhou Liedao

=== Islands of Guangxi ===
- Weizhou and Xieyang Islands

=== Islands of Guangdong ===
- Xiachuan Island
- Shangchuan Island
- Hengqin
- Wanshan Archipelago
- Nan'ao

== Islands of Macau ==
Ilha Verde is connected to the Macao Peninsula as a result of land reclamation. Ilha de Coloane and Ilha da Taipa are connected to each other also as a result of land reclamation.

- Ilha Verde
- Ilha de Coloane
- Ilha da Taipa

== Islands of Hong Kong ==
See Islands and Peninsulas of Hong Kong for a full list.

- Lantau
- Hong Kong Island
- Po Toi Islands
- Cheung Chau

== Islands in the Taiwan Strait ==
- Xiamen (Amoy) (Fujian Province, PRC)
- Kinmen (Quemoy) (Fuchien Province, Republic of China (Taiwan))
  - Lieyu/Lesser Kinmen
  - Dongding Island
  - Beiding Island
  - Fuxing Islet
  - Menghu Islet
- Wuqiu/Daqiu (ROC (Taiwan))
- Xiaoqiu (ROC (Taiwan))
- Luci Island (Xiuyu, Putian, Fujian, China (PRC))
- Penghu (Pescadores) (Taiwan, Republic of China (Taiwan))
  - Dongji Island
  - Hua Islet
  - Cimei
- Cijin (Kaohsiung, Taiwan)

== Islands on the western coast of the Philippines ==
- Batanes
- Luzon
- Mindoro
- Calamian Islands
- Palawan
- Sombrero Island, Batangas
- Tingloy, Batangas

== Islands of Borneo ==
- Balambangan Island (Malaysia)
- Berambang Island (Brunei)
- Chermin Island (Brunei)
- Jong Batu (Brunei)
- Kabung (Indonesia)
- Lemukutan (Indonesia)
- Labuan (Malaysia)
- Louisa Reef (Brunei)
- Mengalum Island (Malaysia)
- Merundung (Indonesia)
- Muara Besar Island (Brunei)
- Pelumpong Island (Brunei)
- Sibungor Island (Brunei)
- Temaju (Indonesia)
- Tiga Island (Malaysia)

== Islands of Indonesia ==
- Riau Archipelago
  - Batam Island
  - Bintan Island
  - Bulan Island
  - Galang Island
  - Great Karimun Island
  - Kundur Island
  - Little Karimun Island
  - Rempang Island
- Lingga Islands
- Tudjuh Archipelago
  - Anambas Islands
  - Badas Islands
  - Natuna Islands
  - Tambelan Archipelago

== Islands on the coast of Malay Peninsula ==
- Besar Island (Malaysia)
- Tioman Island (Malaysia)
- Redang Island (Malaysia)
- Lang Tengah Island (Malaysia)
- Perhentian Islands (Malaysia)
- Kapas Island (Malaysia)
- Rawa Island (Malaysia)
- Pedra Branca (Singapore)
- Sibu Island (Malaysia)
- Pemanggil Island (Malaysia)

== Islands in the Gulf of Siam ==
- Ko Chang (Thailand)
- Ko Kham (Thailand)
- Ko Mak (Thailand)
- Ko Pha Ngan (Thailand)
- Ko Samui (Thailand)
- Ko Tao (Thailand)
- Koh Tang (Cambodia)
- Dao Phu Quoc (Vietnam)

== Islands on the eastern coast of Vietnam ==
- Trà Cổ (vi). Sa Vĩ Cap (vi) in Trà Cổ (vi) island is the North-Easternmost promontory of Vietnam 21°29′23″N 108°4′24″E
- Cát Bà Island
- Bach Long Vi
- Cu Lao Cham (vi)
- Lý Sơn District
- Con Dao

== See also ==
- List of islands of the People's Republic of China
- List of islands of the Republic of China
