= Dangerous Ground (South China Sea) =

Area in the South China Sea

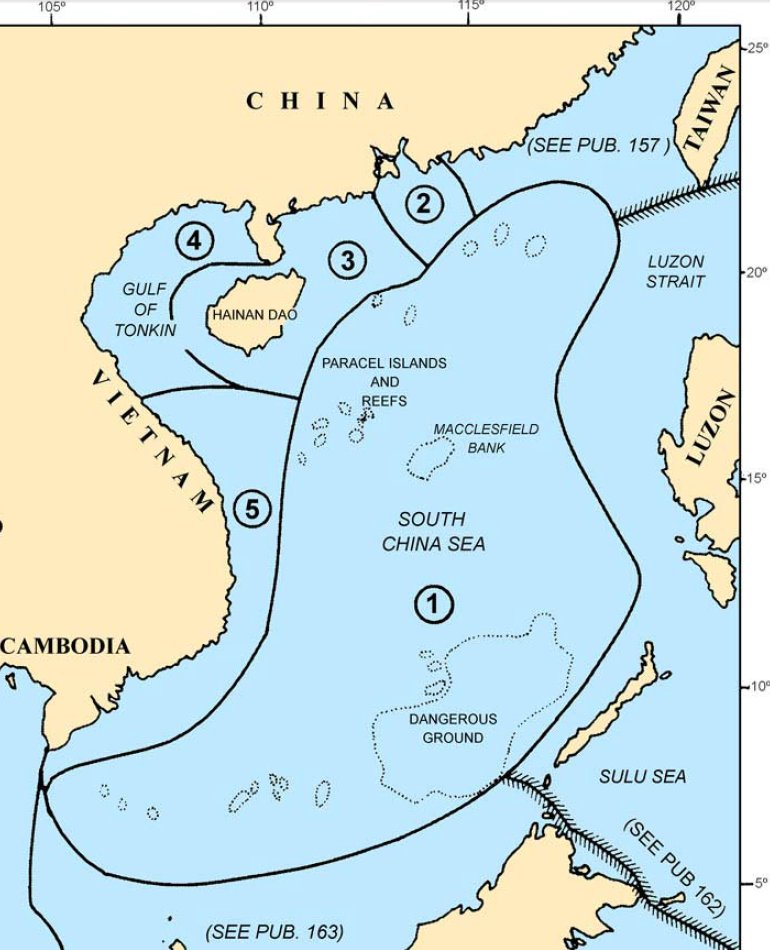
- Map of the South China Sea area showing the location of Dangerous Ground

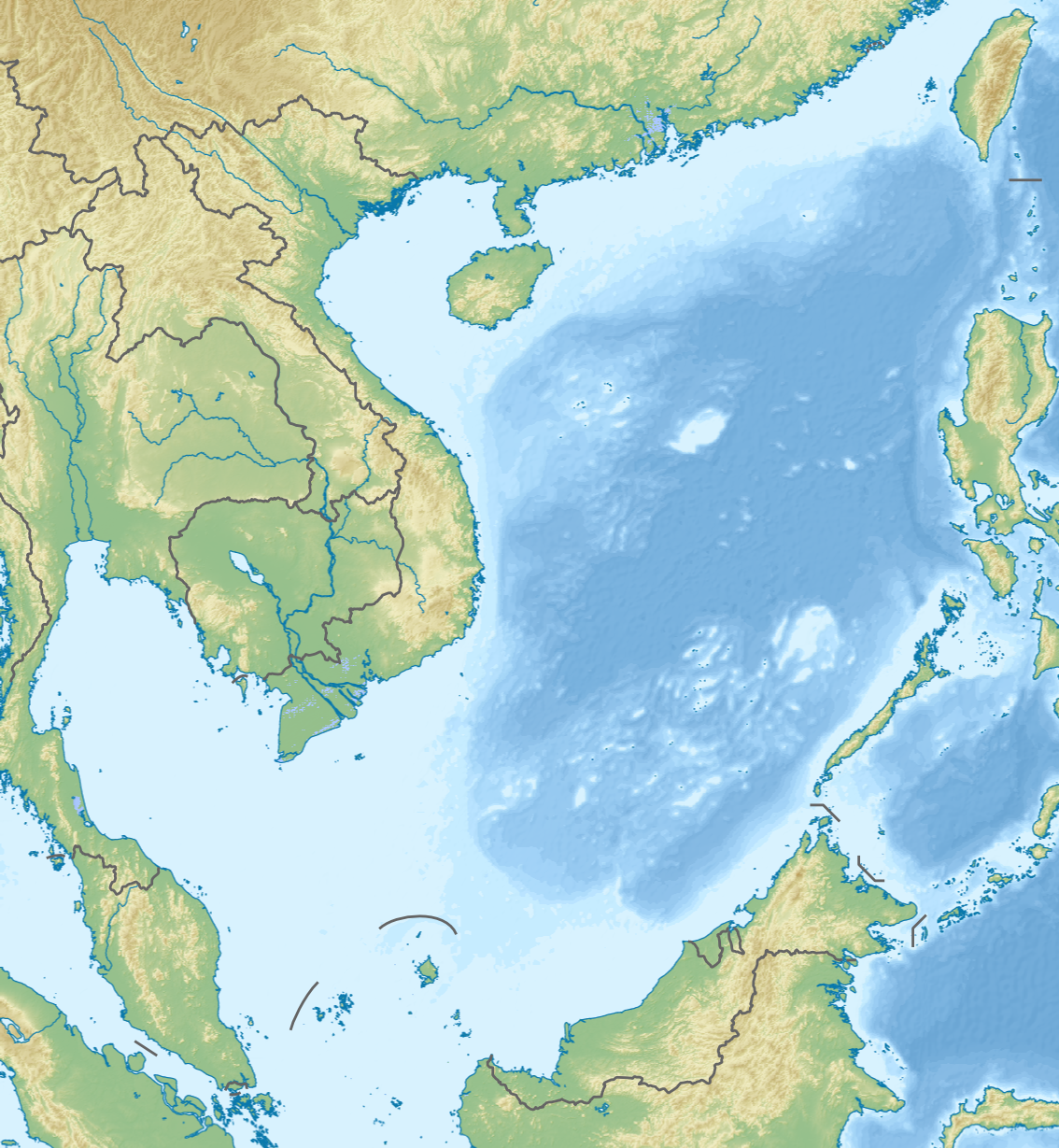
- Location within South China Sea
- Coordinates: 10°N 115°E
- Part of: South China Sea
- Max. length: 340 nmi (630 km)
- Max. width: 175 nmi (324 km)
- Surface area: 52,000 sq nmi (180,000 km^{2})
- Islands: Spratly Islands

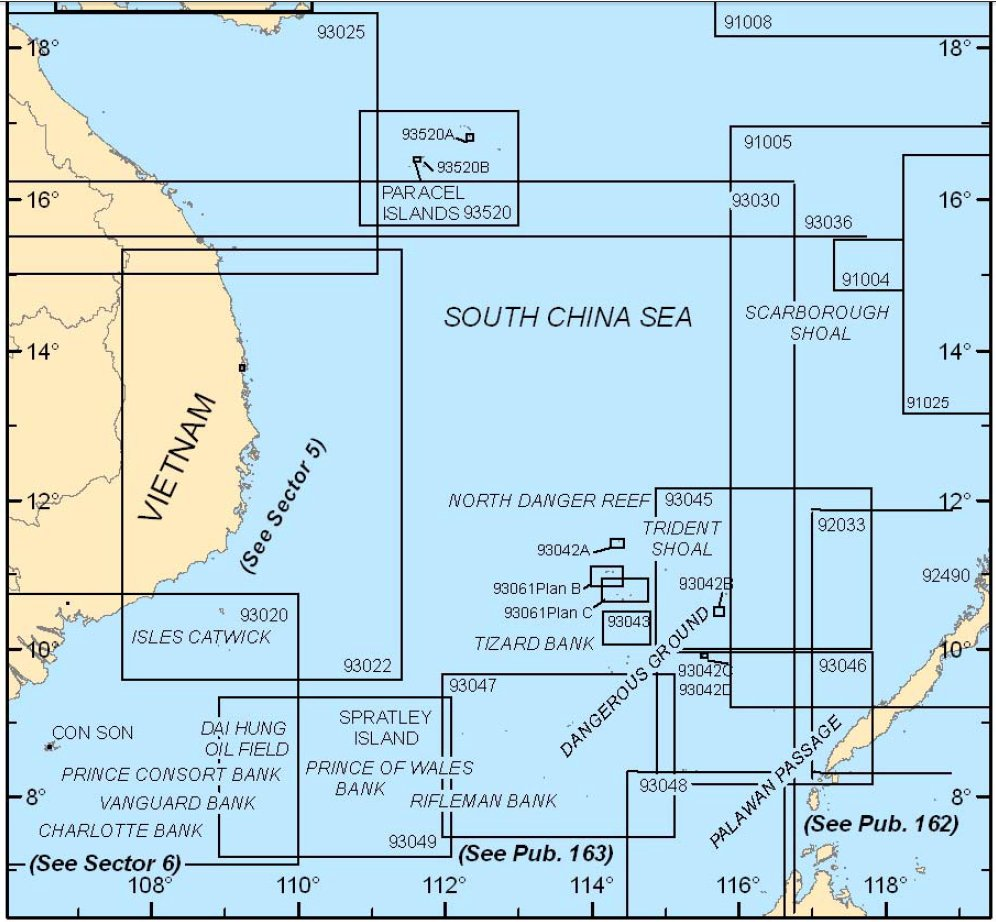
Map showing the areas covered by NGA charts

Dangerous Ground is a large area in the southeast part of the South China Sea characterized by many low islands and cays, sunken reefs, and atolls awash, with reefs often rising abruptly from ocean depths greater than 1,000 metres (3,300 ft).

There are few precise definitions, but Dangerous Ground corresponds roughly to the seas around the eastern half of the Spratly Islands. It is an oblong area running southwest to northeast for about 340 nautical miles (nm) (630 km), 175 nm (324 km) at its widest, with an area of about 52,000 nm^{2} (178,000 km^{2}). It is west of Palawan island and northwest of the Palawan Passage. It lies approximately between 7.5 and 12°N, 113–117°E. The US NGA literature^{etc.} seems to consider its centre as 10°N 115°E.

The area is poorly charted, making it exceptionally dangerous to navigate – the major Singapore-to-Hong-Kong routes go well to the west and east of the area. The Admiralty Sailing Directions give the following warning regarding navigation in this area:

Due to the conflicting dates and accuracy of the various partial surveys of Dangerous Ground, certain shoals and reefs may appear on one chart, but not on another regardless of the scales involved.
Charted depths and their locations may present considerable error in the lesser known regions of this area. Avoidance of Dangerous Ground is the mariner’s only assurance of safety.

The water is a usually greenish-blue and is transparent to depths of 24–42 metres (79–138 ft) on clear days.

== Boundaries ==
The boundary of Dangerous Ground is shown on NGA charts 93044 (NW), 93045 (NE), 93046 (most of the SE), and 93047 (SW). (The missing portion of the SE is covered by 93048 (Note: Chart 93048 is not easily available on-line.) and the top corner of 92006.)

The area is described in NGA Pub. 161, Sailing Directions (Enroute) South China Sea and the Gulf of Thailand. The navigational charts and sailing directions do not completely agree with each other as to the boundary. For example, the Sailing Directions include most of the NW area shown on Chart 93044 as outside of Dangerous ground, but exclude the Reed Bank, which is shown on Chart 93045 as inside Dangerous Ground.

Both publications divide the area into four quadrants - NW, NE, SE and SW:

=== NW ===
Chart 93044 – approx. 10–12°N, 113–115°E; Sailing Directions pp8–10.

- 1.21 North Danger Reef – northern and western sections
  - North Reef, North Pass, Northeast Cay, Shira Islet, Middle Pass, Southwest Cay, West Pass (N), Jenkins Patches, West Pass (S)
- 1.22 North Danger Reef – southern and eastern sections; Trident & Lys Shoals
  - South Reef, South Pass, Sabine Patches, Farquharson Patches, East Pass, Day Shoal, Iroquois Ridge; Trident Shoal, Lys Shoal
- 1.23 Thitu Reefs and surrounding
  - Thitu Island, Subi Reef
- 1.24 Loaita Bank
  - Loaita Island, Lankiam Cay
- 1.25 & 1.26 Tizard Bank
  - Namyit Island, Gaven Reefs, Sand Cay, Itu Aba Island, Petley Reef, Eldad Reef
- 1.26 West of Tizard Bank
  - Western Reef, Discovery Great Reef, Discovery Small Reef

=== NE ===
Chart 93045 – approx. 10–12°N, 115–117°E; Sailing Directions pp10–11.

- 1.27 East of Loaita Bank
  - Menzies Reef, Irving Reef, West York Island
- 1.27 Southampton Reefs (East of Tizard Bank)
  - Hopps Reef, Livock Reef
- Northern NE – Reed Bank
  - Nares Bank, Marie Louise Bank
- 1.27 & 1.28 Central NE
  - Jackson Atoll, Nanshan Island, Flat Island, Third Thomas Shoal, Hopkins Reef, Amy Douglas, Hirane Shoal, Hardy Reef
- 1.29 Eastern NE
  - Sandy Shoal, Seahorse Shoal, Lord Auckland Shoal, Carnatic Shoal

=== SE ===
Chart 93046 – approx. 8–10°N, 115–117°E; Sailing Directions pp11–12.

- 1.30 & 1.31 Eastern SE
  - Half Moon Shoal, Bombay Reef, Royal Captain Shoal
- 1.32 Central SE
  - Sabina Shoal, Boxall Reef, Second Thomas Shoal
- 1.33 & 1.34 Western SE
  - Mischief Reef, First Thomas Shoal, Alicia Annie Reef

=== SW ===
Chart 93047 – approx. 8–10°N, 113–115°E; Sailing Directions pp12–13.

- 1.34 & 1.35 Union Bank
  - Johnson Reef, Collins Reef, Sin Cowe Island, Whitsun Reef, Grierson Reef, Lansdowne Reef,
- 1.36 Central SW
  - Bittern Reef, Allison Reef, Cornwallis South Reef
- 1.37
  - Pearson Reef, Pigeon Reef, Commodore Reef
- 1.38
  - Investigator Shoal, Ardasier Reef, Ardasier Bank
- 1.39
  - Erica Reef, Mariveles Reef, Dallas Reef, Barque Canada Reef.

== Outside of Dangerous Ground ==
Sailing Directions pp13–15. Other parts of the Spratly Islands which are not inside Dangerous Ground include:

- 1.41 – 1.43 West of Dangerous Ground
  - Fiery Cross Reef, London Reefs, Spratly Island
- 1.44 – 1.48 South West and South of Dangerous Ground
  - Amboyna Cay, Southwest Bank, Rifleman Bank, Swallow Reef

== Territorial disputes ==
The sovereignty of many of the islands is disputed, as are economic claims.
