= Commodore Reef =

Reef in the South China Sea

Disputed atoll
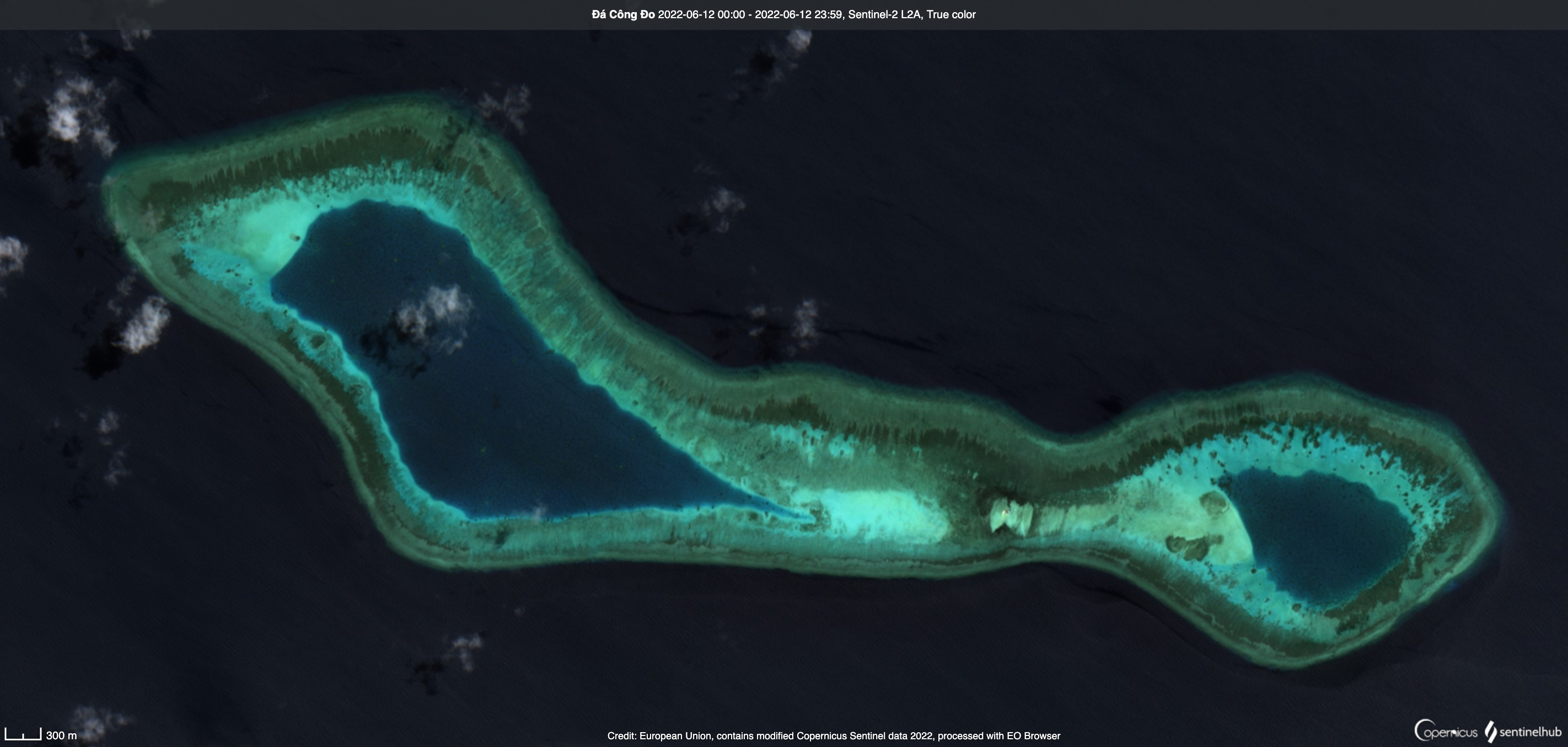
- Commodore Reef

- Location within Spratly Islands
- Other names: Rizal Reef (Philippine English); Bahura ng Rizal (Filipino); Terumbu Laksamana (Malay); Đá Công Đo (Vietnamese) 司令礁 Sīlìng Jiāo (Chinese)

Geography
- Location: South China Sea
- Coordinates: 8°22′N 115°12′E
- Archipelago: Spratly Islands

Administration
- Philippines
- Region: IV-B - MIMAROPA
- Province: Palawan
- Municipality: Kalayaan

Claimed by
- China
- Malaysia
- Philippines
- Taiwan
- Vietnam

Commodore Reef, also known as Rizal Reef (Filipino: Bahura ng Rizal; Malay: Terumbu Laksamana; Vietnamese: Đá Công Đo; Mandarin Chinese: 司令礁; pinyin: Sīlìng Jiāo), is an atoll located in the southeast of Dangerous Ground in the Spratly Islands in the South China Sea. It is located east of the Ardasier Reef and Investigator Shoal, 117.9 miles (189.7 km) northeast of Swallow Reef and 167.1 miles (268.9 km) southeast of Cuarteron Reef. The rock has been legally declared a rock.

It is one of the areas in the Spratly Islands occupied by the Philippines. It appears as two atolls joined by a reef. On the central reef flat, a number of man-made structures are visible within a 25-by-25-metre (82 ft × 82 ft) area.

On 17 February 2020, a Philippine Navy corvette, the BRP Conrado Yap (PS-39) encountered the PLA Navy's (PLAN) Type 056A Jiangdao corvette CNS Liupanshui (hull number 514) while conducting a patrol mission near Commodore Reef. The Chinese vessel reportedly announced "The Chinese government has indisputable sovereignty over the South China Sea, its islands and its adjacent waters" and, according to a Philippine military official, aimed the fire control system's Type IR-17 optoelectronic sensors at the Philippine vessel. Doubt has been cast on the official's claim as the Philippine Navy's Joint Task Force West notes the BRP Conrado Yap, despite being tagged as the Navy's "most powerful warship", does not have the requisite electronic support measures (ESM) to confirm the aiming or status of the Chinese vessel's fire control system.
