= Erica Reef =

Disputed atoll in the South China Sea

Disputed atoll
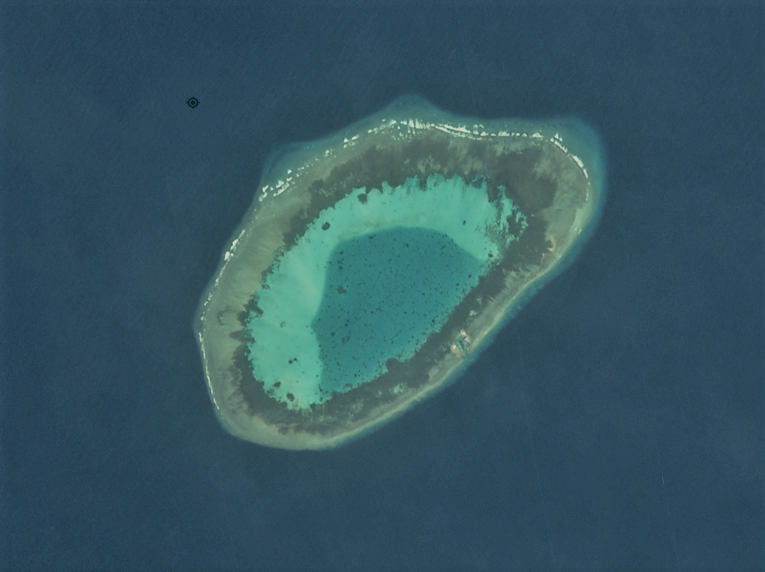
- Satellite image of Erica Reef by NASA.

- Location within Spratly Islands
- Other names: Enola Reef; Terumbu Siput (Malay); Gabriela Silang Reef (Philippine English); Bahura ng Gabriela Silang (Filipino); Đá Én Ca (Vietnamese) 簸箕礁 Bòji Jiāo (Chinese)

Geography
- Location: South China Sea
- Coordinates: 8°6′0″N 114°8′37″E; 8.10000°N 114.14361°E
- Archipelago: Spratly Islands

Administration
- Malaysia
- State: Sabah

Claimed by
- China
- City: Sansha, Hainan
- Philippines
- Municipality: Kalayaan, Palawan
- Taiwan
- Municipality: Cijin, Kaohsiung
- Vietnam
- District: Trường Sa, Khánh Hòa

Erica Reef, also known as Terumbu Siput in Malay, Gabriela Silang Reef (Filipino: Bahura ng Gabriela Silang), Đá Én Ca in Vietnamese and Bòji Jiāo in Mandarin (Chinese: 簸箕礁) is an unbroken drying coral reef located in the southwest of the Dangerous Ground area of the South China Sea. It is part of the hotly contested Spratly Islands.

== Description ==
Emily Reef lies 14 nautical miles (26 km; 16 mi) northeast of Mariveles Reef and about 20 nautical miles (37 km; 23 mi) west of the western part of Investigator Shoal.

It is elliptical in shape, 1.5 miles (2.4 km) long by 1 mile (1.6 km) wide. As a drying reef, it encloses a shallow lagoon at low tide. At high tide, it is submerged, but a few rocks on the eastern end may remain above the water. The reef is unbroken (i.e. has no entrance), but the lagoon is probably accessible to boats at high tide. There is no anchorage.

== Spartly Islands dispute ==
It is part of the Spratly Islands, various or all portions of which are claimed by no less than six countries:

- Brunei
- China
- Malaysia
- the Philippines
- Taiwan
- Vietnam

Erica Reef itself is claimed by China, Taiwan, the Philippines and Vietnam.

Malaysia occupied Erica Reef and built on it a two-storey concrete building and a helipad on 24 April or in June 1999 and maintained an offshore naval station called Station Sierra. The Philippines objected strongly, but China's response was subdued; it is worth noting that the Foreign Minister of Malaysia was in Beijing just before construction commenced.

== Fishing ==
It is in one of the most productive areas in the region for skipjack and yellowfin tuna.
