= South China Sea =

Marginal sea of the Western Pacific Ocean

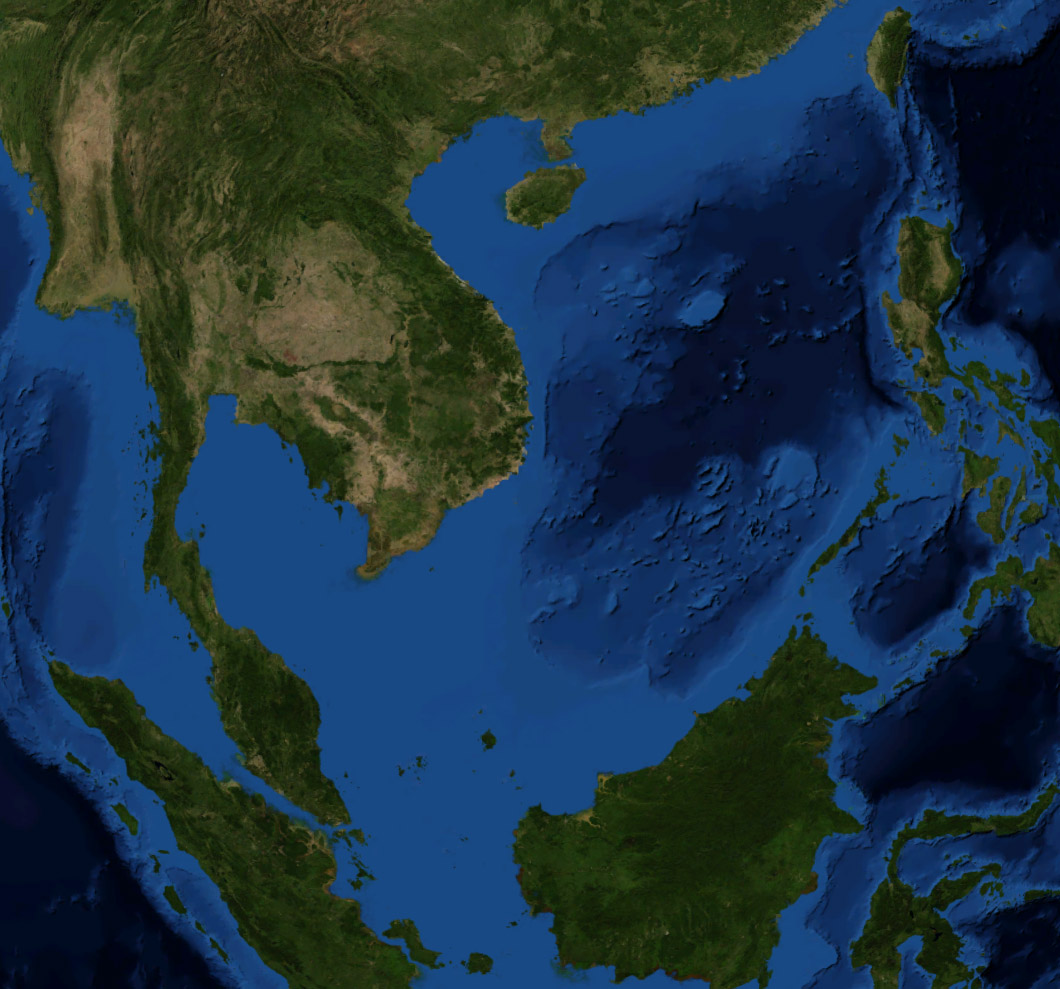
- Satellite image of the South China Sea and to the left the Gulf of Thailand

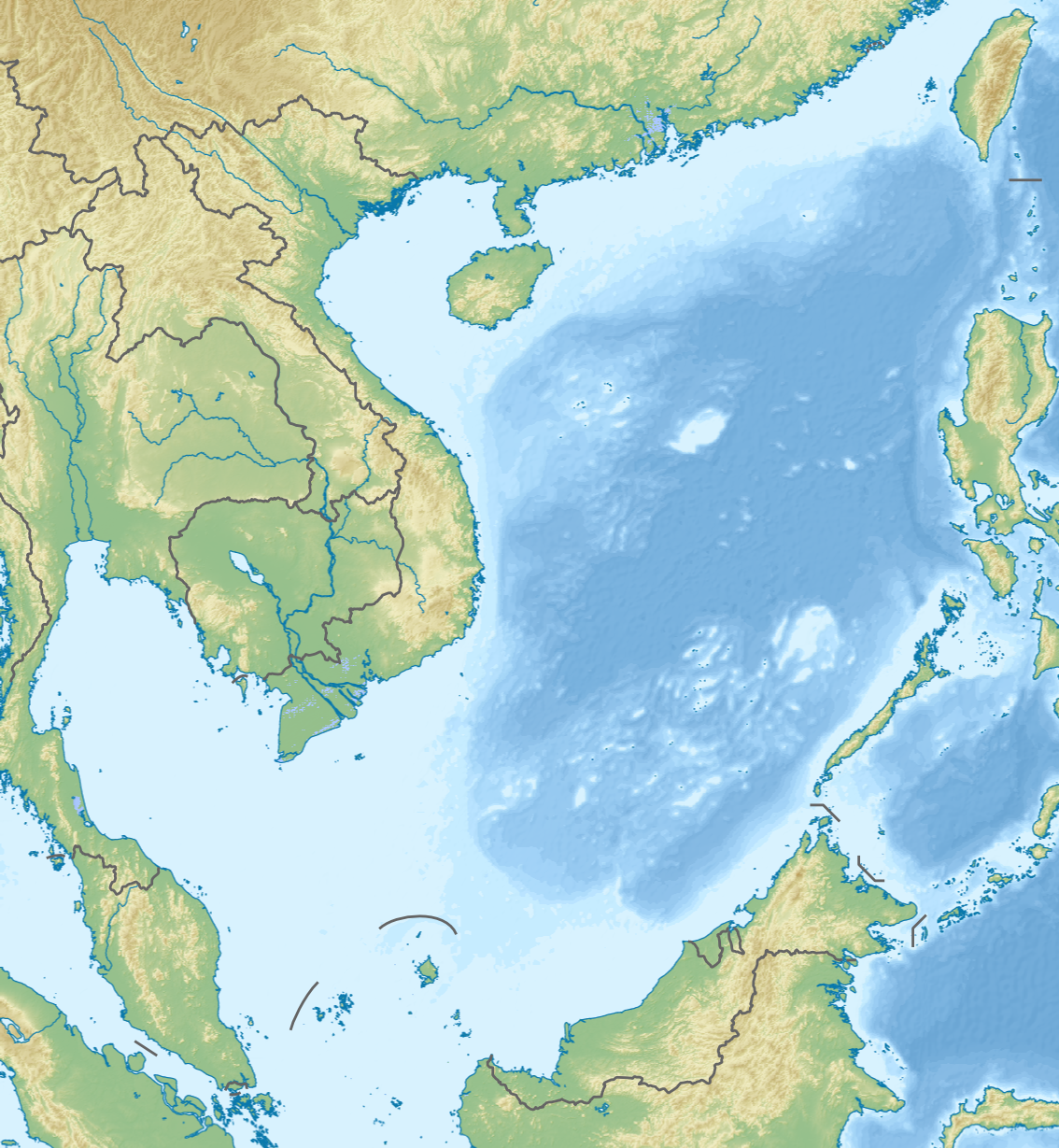
- Location within South China Sea Location within Southeast Asia Location within Asia

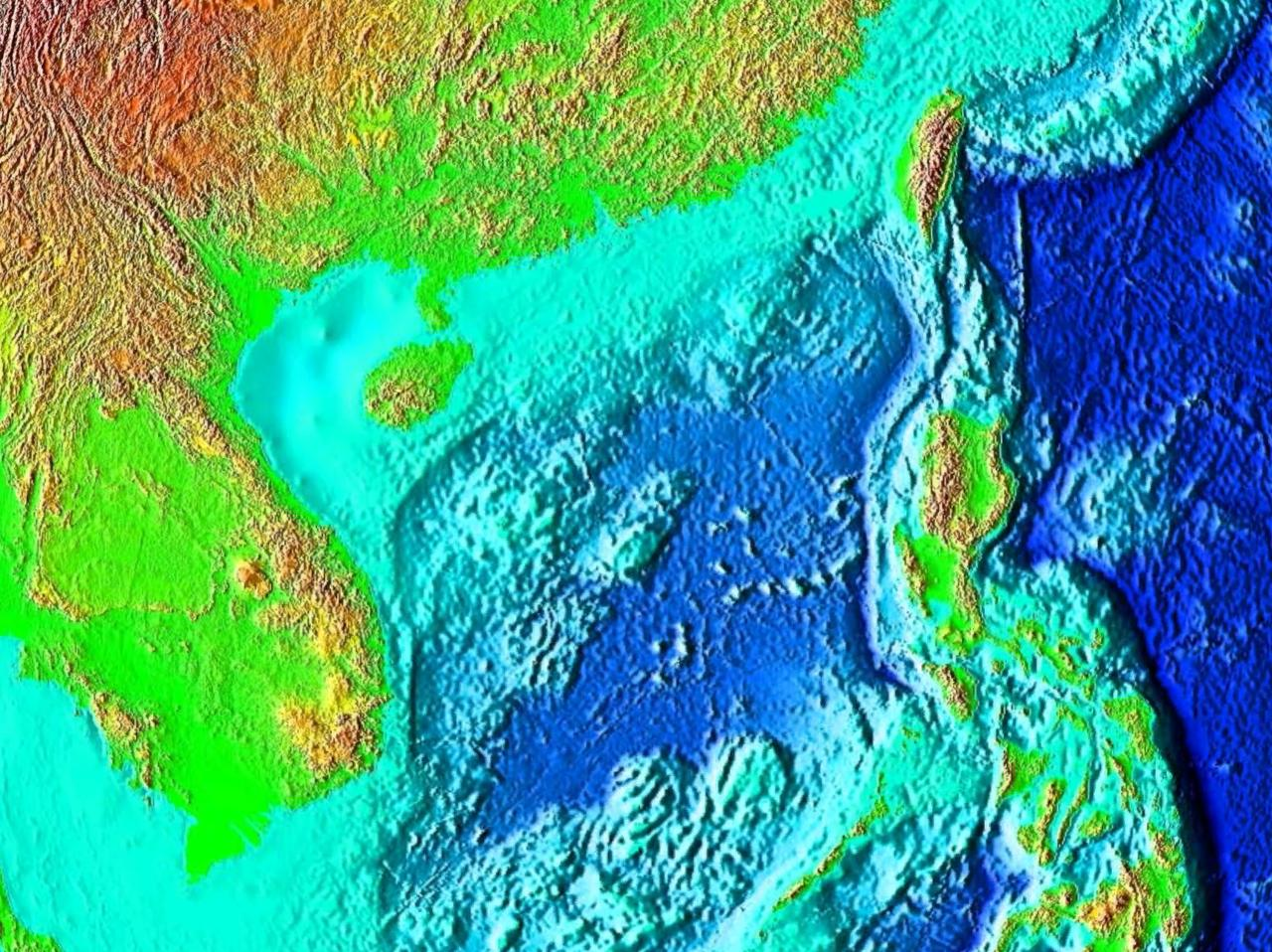
- The northeastern portion of South China Sea
- Location: East Asia and Southeast Asia
- Coordinates: 12°N 113°E
- Type: Sea
- Part of: Pacific Ocean
- River sources: Agno; Jiulong; Kapuas; Mekong; Min; Pahang; Pampanga; Pasig; Pearl; Rajang; Red; Sambas
- Basin countries: List: Brunei China Indonesia Malaysia Philippines Taiwan Vietnam
- Surface area: 3,500,000 square kilometres (1,400,000 sq mi)
- Average depth: 1,212 metres (3,976 ft)
- Max. depth: 5,563 metres (18,251 ft) ±4 metres (13 ft)
- Islands: List of islands in South China Sea
- Trenches: Manila Trench
- Settlements: Major cities: Alaminos; Bà Rịa; Bạc Liêu; Bacoor; Balanga; Batam; Bintulu; Cẩm Phả; Cam Ranh; Candon; Cavite City; Da Nang; Dagupan; Đồng Hới; Hạ Long; Hà Tĩnh; Haikou; Haiphong; Ho Chi Minh City; Hội An; Hong Kong; Kaohsiung; Kota Kinabalu; Kuala Terengganu; Kuantan; Kuching; Laoag; Las Piñas; Macau; Malolos; Manila; Mersing; Miri; Móng Cái; Nakhon Si Thammarat; Nam Định; Nanwan; Navotas; Nha Trang; Olongapo; Parañaque; Pasay; Pattaya; Pekan; Phan Rang–Tháp Chàm; Phan Thiết; Quảng Ngãi; Qui Nhơn; Sầm Sơn; San Fernando; Sanya; Shantou; Sihanoukville; Sóc Trăng; Surat Thani; Tainan; Taitung; Tam Kỳ; Tanjungpinang; Thái Bình; Thanh Hóa; Tuy Hòa; Vigan; Vũng Tàu; Xiamen; Zhanjiang

The South China Sea is a marginal sea of the Western Pacific Ocean. It is bounded in the north by South China, in the west by the Indochinese Peninsula, in the east by the islands of Taiwan and northwestern Philippines (mainly Luzon, Mindoro, and Palawan), and in the south by Borneo, eastern Sumatra, and the Bangka Belitung Islands, encompassing an area of around 3,500,000 km^{2} (1,400,000 sq mi). It communicates with the East China Sea via the Taiwan Strait, the Philippine Sea via the Luzon Strait, the Sulu Sea via the straits around Palawan, the Java Sea via the Karimata and Bangka Straits, and directly with the Gulf of Thailand. Additionally, the Gulf of Tonkin is part of the South China Sea.

$3.4 trillion of the world's $16 trillion maritime shipping passed through the South China Sea in 2016. Oil and natural gas reserves have been found in the area. The Western Central Pacific accounted for 14% of the world's commercial fishing in 2010.

The South China Sea Islands, collectively comprising several archipelago clusters of mostly small uninhabited islands, islets (cays and shoals), reefs/atolls, and seamounts numbering in the hundreds, are subject to competing claims of sovereignty by several countries. These claims are also reflected in the variety of names used for the islands and the sea.

== Etymology ==
South China Sea

Chinese name
- Chinese: 南海
- Hanyu Pinyin: Nán Hǎi
- Literal meaning: South Sea
Transcriptions
Standard Mandarin
- Hanyu Pinyin: Nán Hǎi
- Bopomofo: ㄋㄢˊ ㄏㄞˇ
- Wade–Giles: Nan^{2} Hai^{3}
- IPA: [nǎn xàɪ]
Wu
- Romanization: noe^{平} he^{上}
Hakka
- Romanization: nam^{11} hoi^{31}
Yue: Cantonese
- Jyutping: naam^{4} hoi^{2}
Southern Min
- Hokkien POJ: lâm-hái
- Hainanese Romanization: nâm-hái

Alternative Chinese name
- Simplified Chinese: 南中国海
- Traditional Chinese: 南中國海
- Hanyu Pinyin: Nán Zhōngguó Hǎi
- Literal meaning: South China Sea
Transcriptions
Standard Mandarin
- Hanyu Pinyin: Nán Zhōngguó Hǎi
- Bopomofo: ㄋㄢˊ ㄓㄨㄥ ㄍㄨㄛˊ ㄏㄞˇ
- Wade–Giles: Nan^{2} Chung^{1}-kuo^{2} Hai^{3}
- IPA: [nǎn ʈʂʊ́ŋkwǒ xàɪ]
Wu
- Romanization: noe^{平} tson^{平} koh^{入} he^{上}
Hakka
- Romanization: nam^{11} dung^{24} gued^{2} hoi^{31}
Yue: Cantonese
- Jyutping: naam^{4} zung^{1} gwok^{3} hoi^{2}
Southern Min
- Hokkien POJ: lâm tiong-kok hái
- Hainanese Romanization: nâm tieng-kuōk hái

Vietnamese name
- Vietnamese: Biển Đông
- Hán-Nôm: 𣷷東
- Literal meaning: East Sea

Thai name
- Thai: ทะเลจีนใต้ [tʰā.lēː t͡ɕīːn tâ(ː)j] (South China Sea)
- RTGS: Thale Chin Tai

Japanese name
- Kanji: 南支那海 or 南シナ海 (literally "South Shina Sea")
- Kana: みなみシナかい
Transcriptions
- Romanization: Minami Shina Kai

Malay name
- Malay: Laut Cina Selatan (لاءوت چينا سلاتن) (South China Sea); Laut Nusantara (لاءوت نوسنتارا) (Nusantara Sea); Laut Campa (لاءوت چمڤا) (Champa Sea); Laut Borneo Utara (لاءوت بورنيو اوتارا) (North Borneo Sea)

Indonesian name
- Indonesian: Laut Cina Selatan / Laut Tiongkok Selatan (South China Sea); Laut Natuna Utara (North Natuna Sea; Indonesian official government use; Claimed Indonesian EEZ only)

Filipino name
- Tagalog: Dagat Timog Tsina (Mar de China Meridional); Dagat Luzón (Mar de Luzón); Mar Occidental de Filipinas (Mar de Filipinas Occidental;Pilipinos uso oficial del gobierno; ZEE reclamada por Filipinas solamente)

Portuguese name
- Portuguese: Mar da China Meridional (South China Sea)

Lao name
- Lao: ທະເລຈີນໃຕ້ Thale Chin Tai (South China Sea)

Khmer name
- Khmer: សមុទ្រចិនខាងត្បូង [samut cən kʰaːŋ tʰɓoːŋ] ('South China Sea')

Tetun name
- Tetun: Tasi Sul Xina

South China Sea is the dominant term used in English for the sea, and the name is equivalent in almost all European languages. This name is a result of early European interest in the sea as a route from Europe and South Asia to the trading opportunities of China. In the 16th century, Portuguese sailors referred to it as the China Sea (Mare da China); later, the need to differentiate it from nearby bodies of water led to its renaming to the South China Sea. The International Hydrographic Organization refers to the sea as "South China Sea (Nan Hai)".

The Yi Zhou Shu, which was a chronicle of the Western Zhou dynasty (1046–771 BCE), gives the first Chinese name for the South China Sea as Nanfang Hai (Chinese: 南方海; pinyin: Nánfāng Hǎi; lit. 'Southern Sea'), claiming that barbarians from that sea gave tributes of hawksbill sea turtles to the Zhou rulers. The Classic of Poetry, Zuo Zhuan, and Guoyu classics of the Spring and Autumn period (771–476 BCE) also referred to the sea, but by the name Nan Hai (Chinese: 南海; pinyin: Nán Hǎi; lit. 'South Sea') in reference to the State of Chu's expeditions there. Nan Hai, the South Sea, was one of the Four Seas of Chinese literature. There are three other seas, one for each of the four cardinal directions. During the Eastern Han dynasty (23–220 CE), China's rulers called the sea Zhang Hai (Chinese: 漲海; pinyin: Zhǎng Hǎi; lit. 'distended sea'). Fei Hai (Chinese: 沸海; pinyin: Fèi Hǎi; lit. 'boiling sea') became popular during the Southern and Northern dynasties. Usage of the current Chinese name, Nan Hai (South Sea), gradually became widespread during the Qing dynasty.

In Southeast Asia, it was once called the Champa Sea or Sea of Cham, after the maritime kingdom of Champa (nowadays Central Vietnam), which flourished there before the 16th century. The majority of the sea came under Japanese naval control during World War II, following the military acquisition of many surrounding South East Asian territories in 1941. Japan calls the sea Minami Shina Kai "South China Sea". This was written 南支那海 until 2004, when the Japanese Foreign Ministry and other departments switched the spelling to 南シナ海, which has become the standard usage in Japan.

In China, it is referred to as the South Sea, (南海; Nánhǎi), and in Vietnam the East Sea, Biển Đông. In Malaysia, Indonesia, and the Philippines, it was long known as the South China Sea (Tagalog: Dagat Timog Tsina, Malay: Laut China Selatan), with the part within Philippine territorial waters often called the "Luzon Sea", Dagat Luzon, by the Philippines.

However, following an escalation of the Spratly Islands dispute in 2011, various Philippine government agencies started using the name West Philippine Sea. A Philippine Atmospheric, Geophysical and Astronomical Services Administration (PAGASA) spokesperson stated that the sea to the east of the Philippines will continue to be called the Philippine Sea. In September 2012, Philippine President Benigno Aquino III signed Administrative Order No. 29, mandating that all government agencies use the name West Philippine Sea to refer to the parts of South China Sea within the Philippines exclusive economic zone, including the Luzon Sea as well as the waters around, within and adjacent to the Kalayaan Island Group and Bajo de Masinloc, and tasked the National Mapping and Resource Information Authority to use the name in official maps.

In July 2017, to assert its sovereignty, Indonesia renamed the northern reaches of its exclusive economic zone in the South China Sea as the North Natuna Sea, which is located north of the Indonesian Natuna Islands, and borders the southern Vietnam exclusive economic zone, corresponding to the southern end of the South China Sea. The Natuna Sea is located south of Natuna Island within Indonesian territorial waters. Therefore, Indonesia has named two seas that are portions of the South China Sea: the Natuna Sea, located between the Natuna Islands and the Lingga and Tambelan Archipelagos, and the North Natuna Sea, located between the Natuna Islands and Cape Cà Mau on the southern tip of the Mekong Delta in Vietnam. There has been no agreement between China and Indonesia regarding the so-called the Natuna waters dispute, with China remaining ambiguous about the southern limit of its area of interest.

== Hydrography ==
States and territories with borders on the sea (clockwise from north) include: the People's Republic of China, the Republic of China (Taiwan), the Philippines, Malaysia, Brunei, Indonesia, and Vietnam. Major rivers that flow into the South China Sea include the Pearl, Min, Jiulong, Red, Mekong, Menam, Rajang, Baram, Kapuas, Batang Hari, Musi, Kampar, Indragiri, Pahang, Agno, Pampanga, and Pasig Rivers.

The IHO in its Limits of Oceans and Seas, 3rd edition (1953), defines the limits of the South China Sea as follows:

On the South. The Eastern and Southern limits of Singapore and Malacca Straits [A line joining Tanjong Datok, the Southeast point of Johore (1°22′N 104°17′E) through Horsburgh Reef to Pulo Koko, the Northeastern extreme of Bintan Island (1°13.5′N 104°35′E). The Northeastern coast of Sumatra] as far West as Tanjong Kedabu (1°06′N 102°58′E) down the East coast of Sumatra to Lucipara Point (3°14′S 106°05′E) thence to Tanjong Nanka, the Southwest extremity of Banka Island (where it transitions as Java Sea), through this island to Tanjong Berikat the Eastern point (2°34′S 106°51′E), on to Tanjong Djemang (2°36′S 107°37′E) in Billiton, along the North coast of this island to Tanjong Boeroeng Mandi (2°46′S 108°16′E) and thence a line to Tanjong Sambar (3°00′S 110°19′E) the Southwest extreme of Borneo.

On the East. From Tanjong Sambar through the West coast of Borneo to Tanjong Sampanmangio, the North point, thence a line to West points of Balabac and Secam Reefs, on to the West point of Bancalan Island and to Cape Buliluyan, the Southwest point of Palawan, through this island to Cabuli Point, the Northern point thereof, thence to the Northwest point of Busuanga and to Cape Calavite in the island of Mindoro, to the Northwest point of Lubang Island and to Point Fuego (14°08'N) in Luzon Island, through this island to Cape Engano, the Northeast point of Luzon, along a line joining this cape with the East point of Balintang Island (20°N) and to the East point of Y'Ami Island (21°05'N) thence to Garan Bi, the Southern point of Taiwan (Formosa), through this island to Santyo (25°N) its North Eastern Point.

On the North. From Fuki Kaku, the northern point of Formosa, to Kiushan Tao (Turnabout Island), on to the southern point of Haitan Tao (25°25'N) and thence westward on the parallel of 25°24' North to the coast of Fukien.

On the West. The Mainland, the Southern limit of the Gulf of Thailand, and the East coast of the Malay Peninsula.

However, in a revised draft edition of Limits of Oceans and Seas, 4th edition (1986), the International Hydrographic Organization recognized the Natuna Sea. Thus, the southern limit of the South China Sea would be revised from the Bangka Belitung Islands to the Natuna Islands.

The South China Sea has an average depth of 1,212 m (3,976 ft), and the deepest recorded point is either 5,559 m (18,238 ft) or 5,567 m (18,264 ft).

== Geology ==
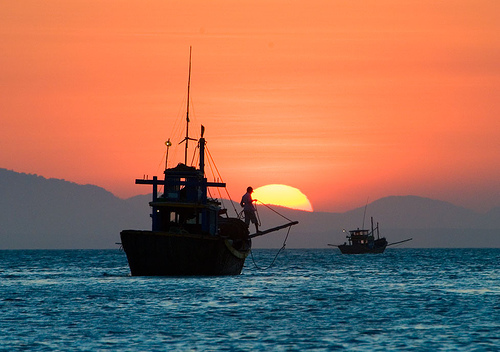
Sunset on the South China Sea off Mũi Né village on the south-east coast of Vietnam

The sea lies above a drowned continental shelf; during recent ice ages, global sea level was hundreds of metres lower, and Borneo was part of the Asian mainland.

The South China Sea opened around 45 million years ago when the "Dangerous Ground" rifted away from southern China. Extension culminated in seafloor spreading around 30 million years ago, a process that propagated to the southwest, resulting in the V-shaped basin we see today. Extension ceased around 17 million years ago.

Arguments have continued about the role of tectonic extrusion in forming the basin. Paul Tapponnier and colleagues have argued that as India collides with Asia, it pushes Indochina to the southeast. The relative shear between Indochina and China caused the South China Sea to open. This view is disputed by geologists who do not consider Indochina to have moved far relative to mainland Asia. Marine geophysical studies in the Gulf of Tonkin by Peter Clift have shown that the Red River Fault was active and causing basin formation at least by 37 million years ago in the northwest South China Sea, consistent with extrusion playing a part in the formation of the sea. Since opening, the South China Sea has been the repository of large sediment volumes delivered by the Mekong River, Red River, and Pearl River. Several of these deltas are rich in oil and gas deposits.

== Islands and seamounts ==
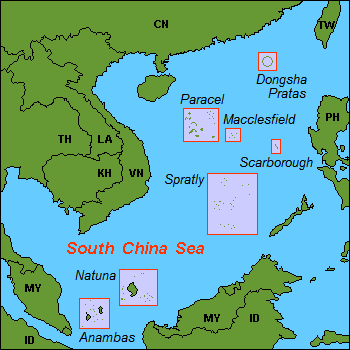
South China Sea

The South China Sea contains over 250 small islands, atolls, cays, shoals, reefs, and sandbars, most of which have no indigenous people, many of which are naturally underwater at high tide, and some of which are permanently submerged. The features are:

- The Spratly Islands
- The Paracel Islands
- Pratas Island and the Vereker Banks
- The Macclesfield Bank
- The Scarborough Shoal

The Spratly Islands span an area of approximately 810 by 900 km, covering around 175 identified insular features, the largest being Taiping Island (Itu Aba) at just over 1.3 kilometres (0.81 mi) long and with its highest elevation at 3.8 metres (12 ft).

The largest singular feature in the area of the Spratly Islands is a 100 kilometres (62 mi) wide seamount called Reed Tablemount, also known as Reed Bank, in the northeast of the group, separated from Palawan Island of the Philippines by the Palawan Trench. Now completely submerged, with a depth of 20 metres (66 ft), it was an island until it was covered approximately 7,000 years ago by increasing sea levels after the last ice age. With an area of 8,866 square kilometres (3,423 sq mi), it is one of the largest submerged atoll structures in the world.

== Trade route ==
The South China Sea has historically been an important trade route between northeast Asia, China, southeast Asia, and going to India and the West. The number of shipwrecks of trading ships that lie on the ocean's floor attests to a thriving trade going back centuries. Nine historic trade ships carrying ceramics dating back to the 10th century until the 19th century were excavated under Swedish engineer Sten Sjöstrand.

Of the world's $16 trillion maritime shipping, $3.4 trillion passed through the South China Sea in 2016. The 2019 data showed that the sea carries trade equivalent to 5 percent of global GDP.

In 2023, the South China Sea remained a major energy trade route, with 10 billion barrels of petroleum and petroleum products and 6.7 trillion cubic feet of liquefied natural gas passing through it. The LNG volume represented 34% of global LNG trade.

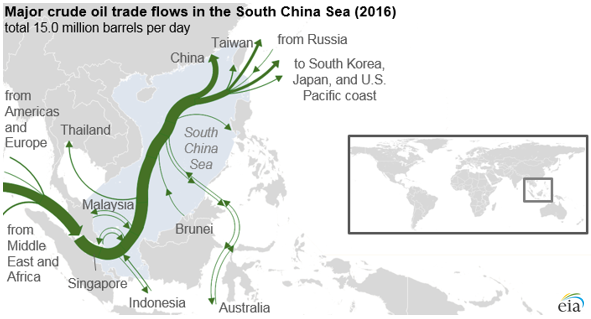
Millions of barrels of crude oil are traded through the South China Sea each day

== Natural resources ==
In 2012–2013, the United States Energy Information Administration estimated that there is relatively little oil and natural gas in contested areas such as the Paracel and the Spratly Islands. Most of the proved or probable 11 billion barrels of oil and 190 trillion cubic feet of natural gas in the South China Sea exist near undisputed shorelines.

In 2010, the Western Central Pacific (excluding the northernmost reaches of the South China Sea closest to the PRC coast) accounted for 14% of the total world catch from commercial fishing of 11.7 million tonnes. This was up from less than 4 million tonnes in 1970.

China announced in May 2017 a breakthrough for mining methane clathrates, when they extracted methane from hydrates in the South China Sea, but commercial adoption may take a decade or more.

== Territorial claims ==
Location of the major islands in Spratly Islands. The eastern Dangerous Ground area contains many other reefs.
- Legend:
- Republic of China (Taiwan): 1: Taiping 2: Zhongzhou
- China: 3: Yongshu 4: Meiji 5: Zhubi 6: Huayang 7: Nanxun 8: Chiguo 9: Dongmen
- Philippines: 10: Flat Island 11: Lankiam Cay 12: Loaita Cay 13: Loaita Island 14: Nanshan Island 15: Northeast Cay 16: Thitu Island 17: West York Island 18: Commodore Reef 19: Irving Reef 20: Second Thomas Shoal
- Vietnam: 21: Southwest Cay 22: Sand Cay 23: Namyit Island 24: Sin Cowe Island 25: Spratly Island 26: Amboyna Cay 27: Grierson Reef 28: Central London Reef 29: Pearson Reef 30: Barque Canada Reef 31: West London Reef 32: Ladd Reef 33: Discovery Great Reef 34: Pigeon Reef 35: East London Reef 36: Alison Reef 37: Cornwallis South Reef 38: Petley Reef 39: South Reef 40: Collins Reef 41: Lansdowne Reef 42: Bombay Castle 43: Prince of Wales Bank 44: Vanguard Bank 45: Prince Consort Bank 46: Grainger Bank 47: Alexandra Bank 48: Orleana Shoal 49: Kingston Shoal
- Malaysia: 50: Swallow Reef 51: Ardasier Reef 52: Dallas Reef 53: Erica Reef 54: Investigator Shoal 55: Mariveles Reef
- Brunei: 56: Louisa Reef

Several countries have made competing territorial claims over the South China Sea. Such disputes have been regarded as some of Asia's potentially most dangerous points of conflict. Both the People's Republic of China (PRC) and the Republic of China (ROC, commonly known as Taiwan) claim almost the entire body as their own, demarcating their claims within what is known as the "nine-dash line", which claims overlap with virtually every other country in the region. Competing claims include:

- Indonesia, Vietnam, China, and Taiwan over the waters northeast of the Natuna Islands
- The Philippines, China, and Taiwan over Scarborough Shoal.
- Vietnam, China, and Taiwan over the waters west of the Spratly Islands. Some or all of the islands themselves are also disputed between Vietnam, China, Taiwan, Brunei, Malaysia, and the Philippines.
- The Paracel Islands are disputed between China, Taiwan, and Vietnam.
- Malaysia, Cambodia, Thailand, and Vietnam over areas in the Gulf of Thailand.
- Singapore and Malaysia along the Strait of Johore and the Strait of Singapore.

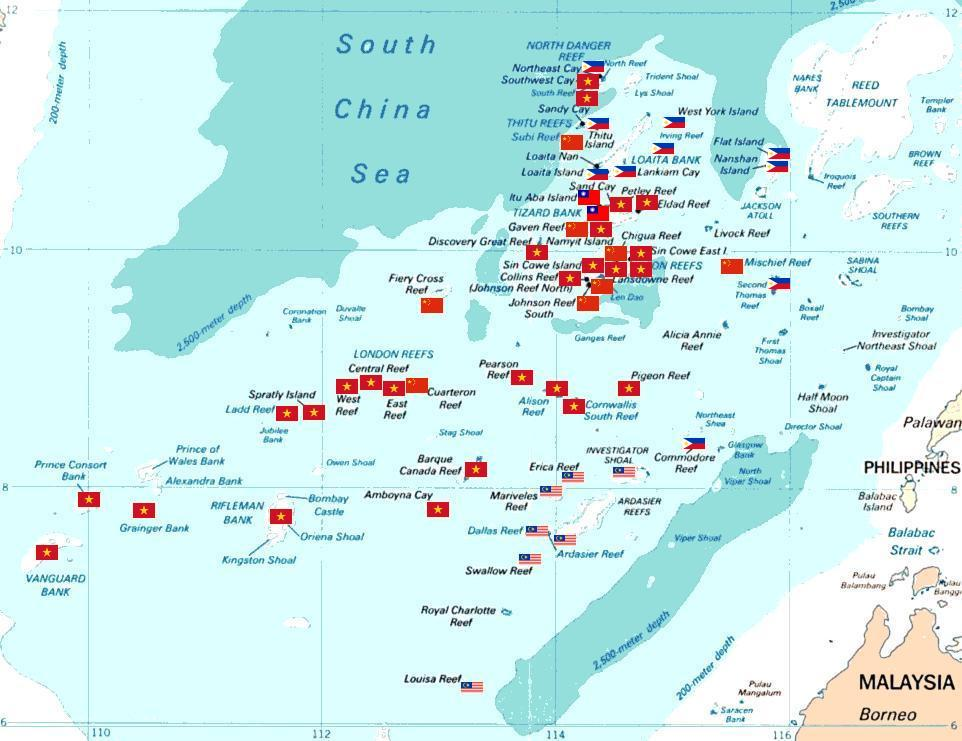
Map of various countries occupying the Spratly Islands

China and Vietnam have both been vigorous in prosecuting their claims. China (various governments) and South Vietnam each controlled part of the Paracel Islands before 1974. A brief conflict in 1974 resulted in 18 Chinese and 53 Vietnamese deaths, and China has controlled the whole of the Paracel since then. The Spratly Islands have been the site of a naval clash, in which over 70 Vietnamese sailors were killed just south of Chigua Reef in March 1988. Disputing claimants regularly report clashes between naval vessels, and these now also include airspace incidents.

ASEAN, in general, and Malaysia, in particular, have been keen to ensure that the territorial disputes within the South China Sea do not escalate into armed conflict. As such, joint development authorities have been established in areas of overlapping claims to jointly develop the area and divide the profits equally without settling the issue of sovereignty over the area. This is true particularly in the Gulf of Thailand. Generally, China has preferred to resolve competing claims bilaterally, while some ASEAN countries prefer multilateral talks, believing that they are disadvantaged in bilateral negotiations with the much larger China and that, because many countries claim the same territory, only multilateral talks could effectively resolve the competing claims.

The overlapping maritime claims in Spratly Islands

The overlapping claims over Pedra Branca or Pulau Batu Putih, including the neighbouring Middle Rocks, by both Singapore and Malaysia were settled in 2008 by the International Court of Justice, awarding Pedra Branca/Pulau Batu Puteh to Singapore and the Middle Rocks to Malaysia. In July 2010, US Secretary of State Hillary Clinton called for China to resolve the territorial dispute. China responded by demanding that the US keep out of the issue. This came at a time when both countries had been engaging in naval exercises as a show of force to the opposing side, which increased tensions in the region. The US Department of Defense released a statement on August 18 where it opposed the use of force to resolve the dispute, and accused China of assertive behaviour. On July 22, 2011, one of India's amphibious assault vessels, the INS Airavat which was on a friendly visit to Vietnam, was reportedly contacted at a distance of 45 nautical miles (83 km) from the Vietnamese coast in the disputed South China Sea on an open radio channel by a vessel identifying itself as the Chinese Navy and stating that the ship was entering Chinese waters. The spokesperson for the Indian Navy clarified that, as no ship or aircraft was visible from INS Airavat, it proceeded as scheduled on its onward journey. The Indian Navy further clarified that "[t]here was no confrontation involving the INS Airavat. India supports freedom of navigation in international waters, including in the South China Sea, and the right of passage in accordance with accepted principles of international law. These principles should be respected by all."

In September 2011, shortly after China and Vietnam had signed an agreement seeking to contain a dispute over the South China Sea, India's state-run explorer, Oil and Natural Gas Corporation (ONGC) said that its overseas investment arm ONGC Videsh Limited had signed a three-year deal with Petrovietnam for developing long-term cooperation in the oil sector and that it had accepted Vietnam's offer of exploration in certain specified blocks in the South China Sea. In response, Chinese Foreign Ministry spokesperson Jiang Yu issued a protest. The spokesman of the Ministry of External Affairs of the Government of India responded by saying that "The Chinese had concerns, but we are going by what the Vietnamese authorities have told us and have conveyed this to the Chinese." The Indo-Vietnamese deal was also denounced by the Chinese state-run newspaper Global Times.

In 1999, Taiwan claimed the entirety of the South China Sea islands under the administration of Lee Teng-hui. The entire subsoil, seabed, and waters of the Paracels and Spratlys are claimed by Taiwan.

In 2012 and 2013, Vietnam and Taiwan butted heads against each other over anti-Vietnamese military exercises by Taiwan.

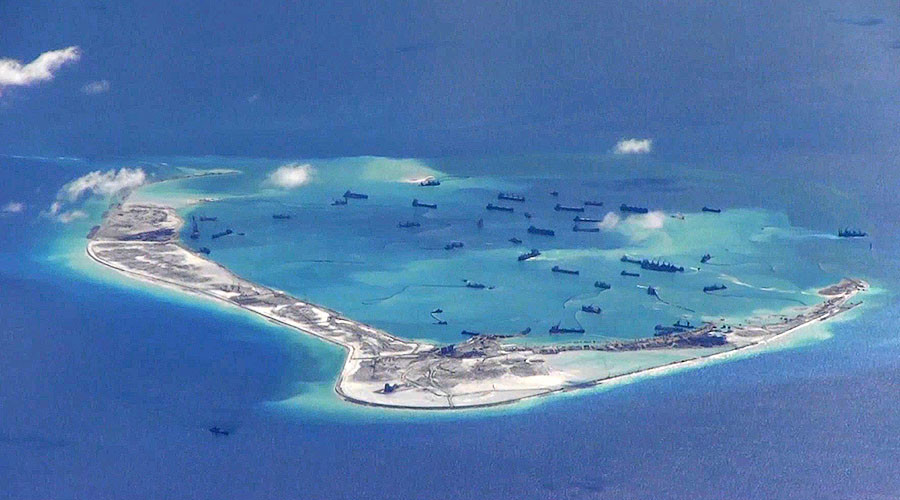
Subi Reef being built up into an artificial island, 2015

In May 2014, China established an oil rig near the Paracel Islands, leading to multiple incidents between Vietnamese and Chinese ships. Vietnamese analysis identifies this change in strategy, generating ongoing incidents as occurring since 2012.

In December 2018, retired Chinese admiral Luo Yuan proposed that a possible solution to tensions with the United States in the South China Sea would be to sink one or two United States Navy aircraft carriers to break US morale. Also in December 2018, Chinese commentator and Senior Colonel in the People's Liberation Army Air Force, Dai Xu, suggested that China's navy should ram United States Navy ships sailing in the South China Sea.

The US, although not a signatory to UNCLOS, has maintained its position that its naval vessels have consistently sailed unhindered through the South China Sea and will continue to do so. At times, US warships have come within the 12 nautical-mile limit of Chinese-controlled islands (such as the Paracel Islands), arousing China's ire. During the US Chief of Naval Operations' visit to China in early 2019, he and his Chinese counterpart worked out rules of engagement, whenever American warships and Chinese warships encounter on the high seas.

On 26 June 2020, the 36th Association of Southeast Asian Nations (ASEAN) Summit was held virtually. Vietnam, as the Chairman of the Summit, released the Chairman's Statement. The statement said the United Nations Convention on the Law of the Sea is "the basis for determining maritime entitlements, sovereign rights, jurisdiction and legitimate interests over maritime zones, and the 1982 UNCLOS sets out the legal framework within which all activities in the oceans and seas must be carried out."

In November 2025, Australia raised concerns over China's military expansion in the South and East China Seas, citing increased risks to trade routes. The remarks followed an incident in which a Chinese fighter jet dropped flares near an Australian patrol plane, deemed “unsafe and unprofessional,” and were made during the Indo-Pacific Navy Conference amid Australia's AUKUS nuclear submarine program.

=== 2016 arbitration ===
In January 2013, the Philippines initiated arbitration proceedings against China (PRC) over issues surrounding the nine-dash line, characterization of maritime features, and EEZ. (Note: PCA Award, Section V(F)(d)(264, 266, 267), p. 113.) (Note: PCA Award, Section II(A), p. 11.) China did not participate in the arbitration.

On 12 July 2016, an arbitral tribunal ruled in favor of the Philippines on most of its submissions. It clarified that it would not "rule on any question of sovereignty over land territory and would not delimit any maritime boundary between the Parties" but concluded that China had not historically exercised exclusive control within the nine-dash line, hence has "no legal basis" to claim "historic rights" over the resources. It also concluded that China's historic rights claims over the maritime areas (as opposed to land masses and territorial waters) inside the nine-dash line would have no lawful effect outside of what is entitled to under UNCLOS. (Note: PCA Award, Section V(F)(d)(278), p. 117.) It criticized China's land reclamation projects and its construction of artificial islands in the Spratly Islands, stating that it had caused "severe harm to the coral reef environment." Finally, it characterized Taiping Island and other features of the Spratly Islands as "rocks" under UNCLOS, and therefore are not entitled to a 200 nautical mile exclusive economic zone. The arbitral tribunal decision was ruled as final and non-appealable by either country.

China rejected the ruling, calling it "ill-founded". China's response was to ignore the arbitration result and to continue pursuing bilateral discussions with the Philippines.

Taiwan, which currently administers Taiping Island, the largest of the Spratly Islands, also rejected the ruling. As of November 2023, 26 governments support the ruling, 17 issued generally positive statements noting the ruling but not calling for compliance, and eight rejected it. The governments in support are Australia, Austria, Belgium, Canada, the Czech Republic, Denmark, Finland, France, Germany, Greece, India, Ireland, Italy, Japan, the Netherlands, New Zealand, the Philippines, Poland, Portugal, Romania, Slovakia, South Korea, Spain, Sweden, the United Kingdom, and the United States; the governments in opposition are China, Montenegro, Pakistan, Russia, Sudan, Syria, Taiwan, and Vanuatu. The United Nations itself does not have a position on the legal and procedural merits of the case or on the disputed claims, and the Secretary-General expressed his hope that the continued consultations on a Code of Conduct between ASEAN and China under the framework of the Declaration of the Conduct of Parties in the South China Sea will lead to increased mutual understanding among all the parties.

== See also ==
- List of maritime features in the Spratly Islands
- West Philippine Sea
- Natuna Sea
