= Reed Tablemount =

Guyot in South China Sea

Reed Tablemount Reed Bank Recto Bank
- Summit depth: 9 to 45 metres (30 to 148 ft)
- Summit area: 8,866 square kilometres (3,423 mi^{2})

Location
- Location: South China Sea
- Coordinates: 11°20′N 116°50′E
- Country: Philippines, disputed by China

Geology
- Type: Guyot

Reed Tablemount (also referred to as Reed Bank, Recto Bank and several other names) is a large tablemount or guyot in the South China Sea north-east of Dangerous Ground and north-east of the Spratly Islands. It covers an area of 8,866 square kilometres (3,423 sq mi), but with depths between only 9 and 45 metres (30 and 148 ft). The submerged but hydrocarbon-rich area includes Nares Bank and Marie Louise Bank.

Although the Permanent Court of Arbitration ruled in 2016 that the area is within the Philippine exclusive economic zone, economic rights to the area continue to be disputed – mainly by the People's Republic of China – and exploitation of the hydrocarbon reserves by the Philippines were suspended in 2015.

The tablemount is in the northeast quadrant of the Philippine's Kalayaan claimed territory, which also includes most of the north and east portions of the Spratly Islands. The area is located off the northwest coast of Palawan, north of Iroquois reef, Pennsylvania reef and the Southern reefs, and east of the northern part of the Spratly Islands. The nearest occupied parts of the Spratly Islands are Philippine-occupied Flat Island, Nanshan Island and Second Thomas Shoal, and the PRC-occupied Mischief Reef.

== History ==
Petroleum exploration in the Recto Bank (Reed Bank) area began in the 1970s. In 1976, natural gas was discovered in the Sampaguita structure following the drilling of an exploratory well. Three wells were eventually drilled at the southwestern end of the structure during the 1970s and 1980s, two of which tested gas at flow rates of 3.6 million cubic feet (100,000 cubic metres) per day and 3.2 million cubic feet (91,000 cubic metres) per day, respectively.

Following China's occupation of Mischief Reef in the mid-1990s, the Philippines deliberately grounded the BRP Sierra Madre (LT-57), a World War II-era tank landing ship, on the Second Thomas Shoal in 1999 to establish a Philippine naval outpost in the area. The vessel has since been staffed by a small detachment of Philippine Marines.

In June 2019, a Filipino fishing vessel anchored at Reed Bank was struck and sunk by a Chinese fishing vessel. The Armed Forces of the Philippines stated that it believed the collision was deliberate, noting that the wood-hulled Filipino vessel, Gimver 1, was anchored when it was struck and that the steel-hulled Chinese vessel failed to stop and render assistance. The 22-member Filipino crew was rescued by a nearby Vietnamese fishing vessel that responded to their distress calls.

== Oil, gas and SC72 ==
Seismic surveys indicate that the Reed Tablemount is rich in oil and gas deposits, but they have only been partly tapped due to disputed claims from various countries, most particularly the PRC.

Exploration in the area began in 1970, and in 1976 gas was discovered in the Sampaguita structure following the drilling of a well. In total, three wells have been drilled to date, all located at the southwest end of the Sampaguita structure.

The initial two-year concession by the Philippines' Government to extract the resources, SC72, formerly GSEC101, was awarded to Sterling Energy PLC in June 2002. In April 2005, Forum Energy PLC (FEP) acquired the concession from Sterling and became its operator. Forum Energy PLC (FEP) is a London-based listed oil and gas exploration firm focused on the Philippines; it is 64.45% owned by Philex Petroleum Corporation. In February 2010, the licence was converted to a Service Contract.

In February 2011, Forum Energy began a geophysical survey in the SC 72 licence area. The 2011 work programme acquired 2,202 line-kilometres of 2D seismic, gravity, and magnetic data across SC 72, as well as 565 square kilometres of 3D seismic data over the Sampaguita field. A 2012 interpretation by Weatherford Petroleum Consultants indicated approximately 2.6 trillion cubic feet of gas in place at Sampaguita. That March, two PRC Navy patrol boats threatened to ram Forum Energy's ships, ordering them out of the area on the basis that the Reed Tablemount was under PRC jurisdiction. Forum Energy chose to cease on-site operations in the face of the Chinese aggression.

In July 2011 the Philippines' Department of Energy (DOE) approved the commencement of a two-year phase of the project leading to the drilling of two wells, and preparations commenced. However, the PRC Government had also granted exploration rights to the area to the PRC State-owned China National Offshore Oil Corporation (CNOOC). The PRC objected to the Philippine arrangement. The requisite approvals from the Philippine DOE to commence drilling were not issued, and the project was placed on hold.

In May 2012, the then Philex chairman and CEO, "MVP" (Manuel V. Pangilinan), made an offer to CNOOC, which CNOOC turned down. There have been further meetings between Philex and CNOOC, but the project remains on hold.
