= Merundung =

Small island in West Kalimantan

Coordinates: 2°4′13″N 109°5′53″E

Merundung is one of the small islands located in Sambas Regency, West Kalimantan, Indonesia.

== Description ==
This island has an area of about 3.38 km^{2} with a coastline of 9.1 km. This island is located in the Natuna Sea and is included in a group of small islands in the northwest tip of West Kalimantan. This island is often misunderstood as part of the Riau Islands Province (Kepri) because of its position in the Natuna Sea waters, which do border several provinces in Indonesia.

The island is characterized by lowlands with an average height of only about 5 meters above sea level and the highest point reaching 7 meters. Vegetation on the island is dominated by green pine forests with a tree cover level of 90%. This reflects a tropical climate with high rainfall throughout the year. The coral reef ecosystem around the island supports marine biodiversity, including various species of reef fish and other marine life.

The island does not have a significant population. Activities around the island are dominated by traditional fishermen who utilize marine resources to meet their daily needs.

Merundung Island is also known as one of Indonesia's outermost islands that functions as a boundary of the country's sovereign territory. The island plays an important role in maintaining Indonesia's territorial sovereignty in border areas and is part of the diversity of ecosystems in the archipelago.
