= Dallas Reef =

Reef in the South China Sea

Disputed atoll
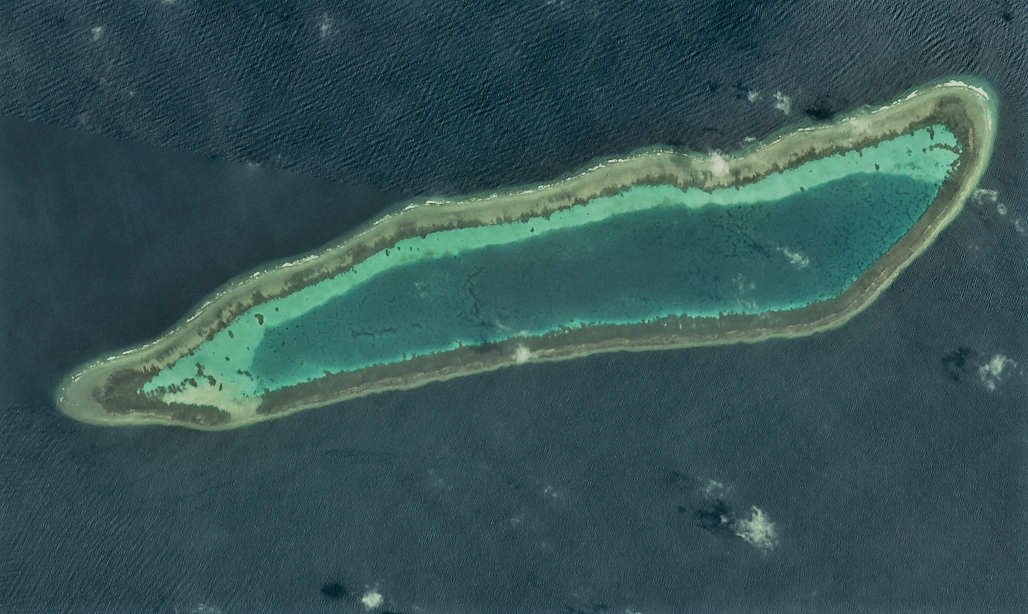
- Satellite image of Dallas Reef by NASA.

- Location within Spratly Islands
- Other names: Terumbu Laya (Malay); Đá Suối Cát (Vietnamese) 光星礁 Guāngxīng Jiāo (Chinese); Rajah Matanda Reef (Philippine English); Bahura ng Rajah Matanda (Filipino)

Geography
- Location: South China Sea
- Coordinates: 7°38′20″N 113°48′0″E
- Archipelago: Spratly Islands
- Length: 7 km (4.3 mi)
- Width: 2 km (1.2 mi)

Administration
- Malaysia
- State: Sabah

Claimed by
- China
- City: Sansha, Hainan
- Taiwan
- Municipality: Cijin, Kaohsiung
- Vietnam
- District: Truong Sa, Khanh Hoa

Dallas Reef (7°38′N 113°48′E), also known as Malay: Terumbu Laya; Vietnamese: đá Suối Cát; Mandarin Chinese: 光星礁; pinyin: Guāngxīng Jiāo; Rajah Matanda Reef (Filipino: Bahura ng Rajah Matanda), lies on the SW extremity of Dangerous Ground (South China Sea) in the Spratly Islands of the South China Sea.

It is approximately 7 kilometres (4.3 mi) long and 2 kilometres (1.2 mi) wide, and encloses a lagoon around 15 metres (49 ft) deep. It is 9 kilometres (5.6 mi) west of Ardasier Reef, and 26 kilometres (16 mi) north of Swallow Reef.

As with all of the Spratly Islands, the ownership of the atoll is disputed. It is controlled by Malaysia, and claimed by the People's Republic of China, the Republic of China (Taiwan) and Vietnam. The Filipino name is named after precolonial Philippine ruler of Manila, Rajah Matanda.
