= South Reef =

Reef

Disputed reef
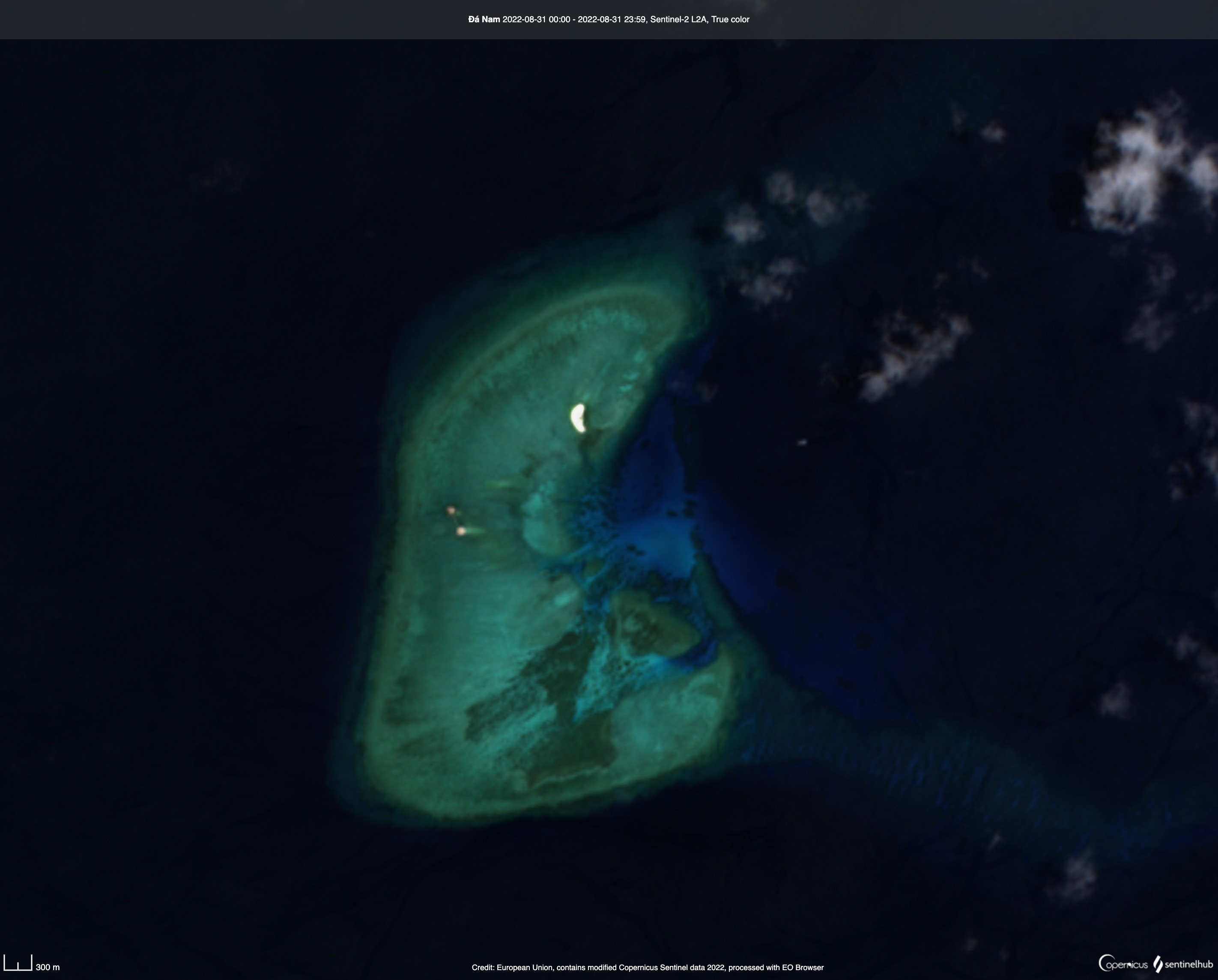
- South Reef

- Location within Spratly Islands
- Other names: Đá Nam (Vietnamese); Timog Peligro Reef (Philippine English); Bahura ng Timog Peligro (Filipino) 奈羅礁 Nàiluó jiāo (Chinese)

Geography
- Location: South China Sea
- Coordinates: 11°23′14″N 114°17′55″E
- Archipelago: Spratly Islands
- Area: 60 ha (150 acres)

Administration
- Vietnam
- District: Trường Sa District
- Commune: Song Tử Tây Commune

Claimed by
- China
- Philippines
- Taiwan
- Vietnam

South Reef (Filipino: Bahura ng Timog Peligro); Nam Reef (Vietnamese: Đá Nam); Mandarin Chinese: 奈羅礁; pinyin: Nàiluó jiāo, is a reef on the southern part of the North Danger Reef of the Spratly Islands in the South China Sea. The reef has been occupied by Vietnam since 1988. It is also claimed by China (PRC), the Philippines, Vietnam, and Taiwan (ROC).

== See also ==
- Spratly Islands dispute
