= Discovery Great Reef =

Reef

Disputed reef
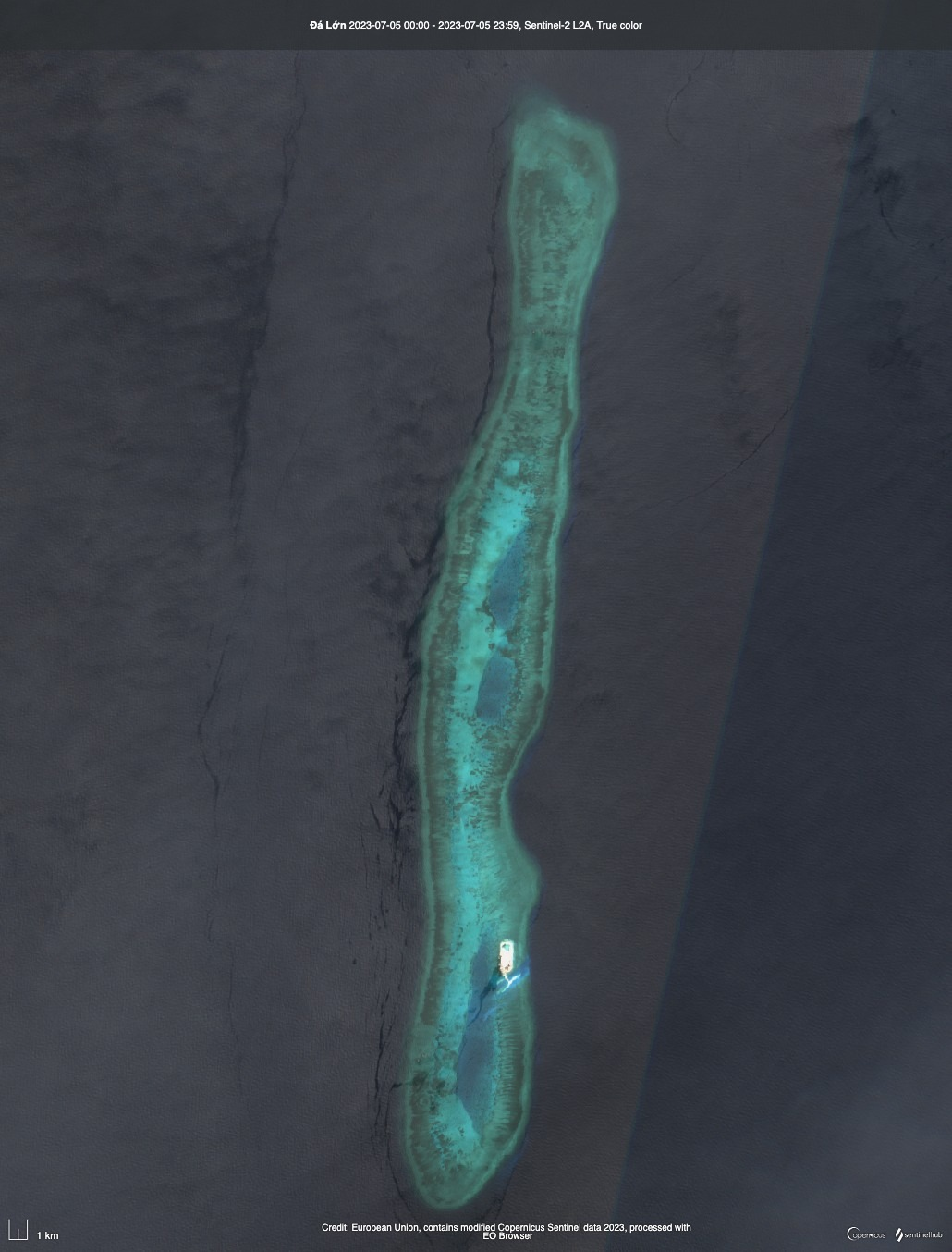
- Discovery Great Reef in 2023

- Location within Spratly Islands
- Other names: Đá Lớn (Vietnamese); Paredes Reef (Philippine English); Bahura ng Paredes(Filipino) 大现礁 Dàxiàn jiāo (Chinese)

Geography
- Location: South China Sea
- Coordinates: 10°3′42″N 113°51′6″E
- Archipelago: Spratly Islands

Administration
- Vietnam
- District: Trường Sa District
- Commune: Sinh Tồn Commune

Claimed by
- China
- Philippines
- Taiwan
- Vietnam

Discovery Great Reef (Filipino: Bahura ng Paredes); Lớn Reef (Vietnamese: Đá Lớn); Mandarin Chinese: 大现礁; pinyin: Dàxiàn jiāo, is a reef on the Spratly Islands in the South China Sea. The reef has been occupied by Vietnam since 1988. It is also claimed by China (PRC), the Philippines, Vietnam, and Taiwan (ROC).

== See also ==
- Spratly Islands dispute
