= Lansdowne Reef =

Island

Disputed island
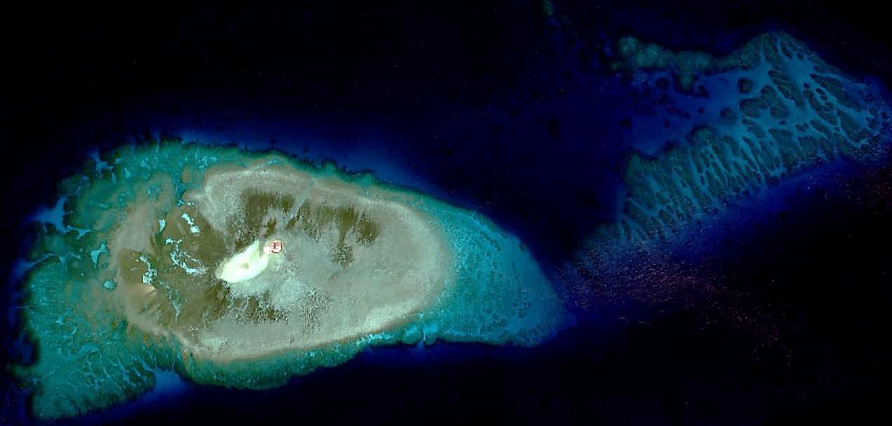
- Lansdowne Reef

- Location within Spratly Islands
- Other names: Đá Len Đao (Vietnamese); Burunyugan Reef 8 (Philippine English); Bahura ng Burunyugan 8 (Filipino) 琼礁 Qióng jiāo(Chinese)

Geography
- Location: South China Sea
- Coordinates: 9°46′46″N 114°22′11″E
- Archipelago: Spratly Islands

Administration
- Vietnam
- District: Trường Sa District
- Commune: Sinh Tồn Commune

Claimed by
- China
- Philippines
- Taiwan

Lansdowne Reef (Filipino: Bahura ng Burunyugan 8; Len Đao Reef Vietnamese: Đá Len Đao; Chinese: 琼礁; pinyin: Qióng jiāo), is a cay on the southern part of the Union Banks of the Spratly Islands in the South China Sea. The island has been occupied by Vietnam since 1988. It is also claimed by China (PRC), the Philippines, Vietnam, and Taiwan (ROC).

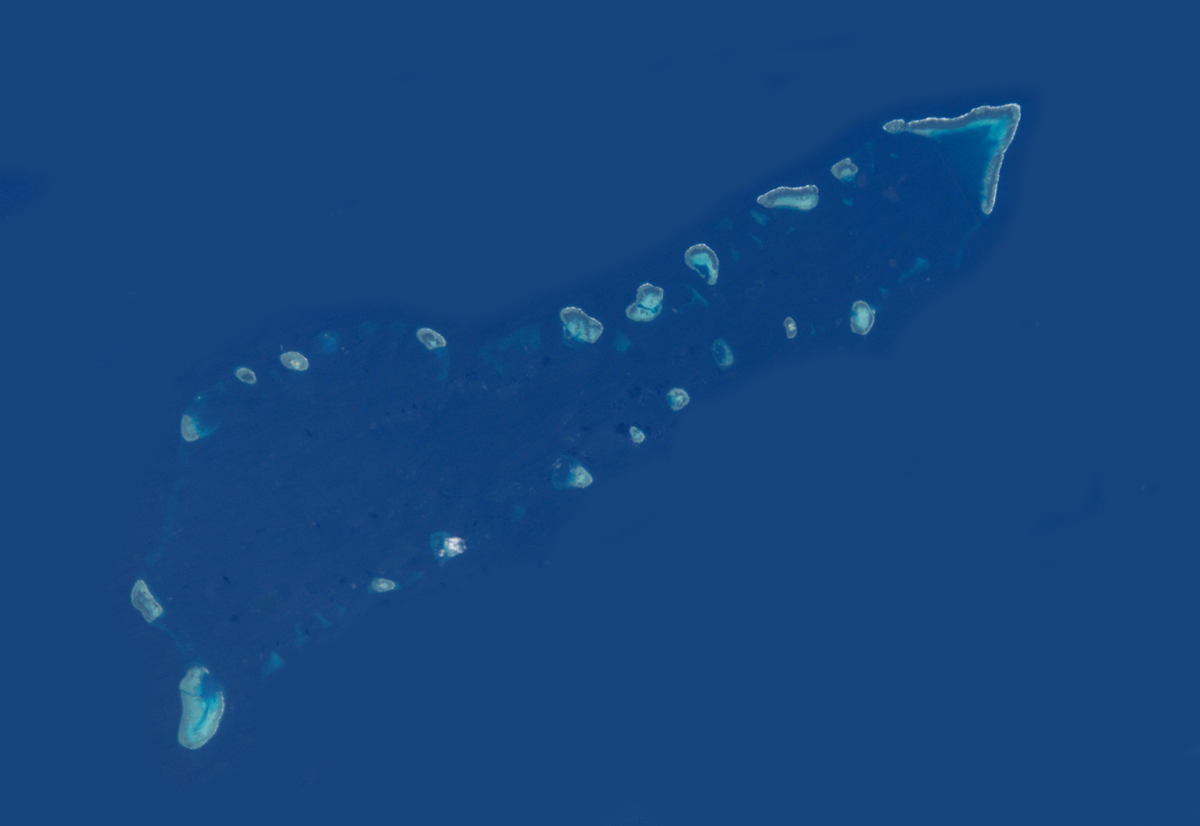

== See also ==
- Spratly Islands dispute
