= Grierson Reef =

Reef

Grierson Reef/Sin Cowe East Island
Disputed island
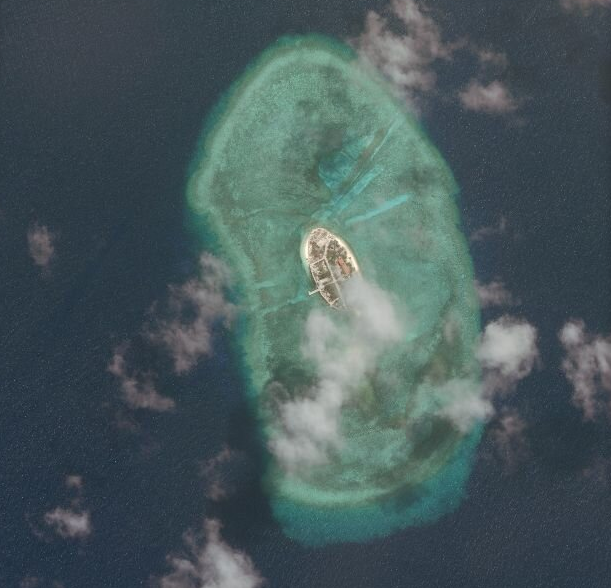
- Grierson Reef

- Location within Spratly Islands
- Other names: Sinh Tồn Đông (Vietnamese); Burunyugan 14 Reef (Philippine English); Bahura ng Burunyugan 14 (Filipino) 染青沙洲 Rǎnqīng shāzhōu (Chinese)

Geography
- Location: South China Sea
- Coordinates: 9°54′9″N 114°33′51″E
- Archipelago: Spratly Islands

Administration
- Vietnam
- District: Trường Sa District
- Commune: Sinh Tồn Commune

Claimed by
- China
- Philippines
- Taiwan

Grierson Reef (Filipino: Bahura ng Burunyugan 14); Sin Cowe East Island (Vietnamese: Đảo Sinh Tồn Đông); Mandarin Chinese: 染青沙洲; pinyin: Rǎnqīng shāzhōu, is a cay on the eastern part of the Union Banks of the Spratly Islands in the South China Sea. The island has been occupied by Vietnam since 1978. It is also claimed by China (PRC), the Philippines, Vietnam, and Taiwan (ROC).

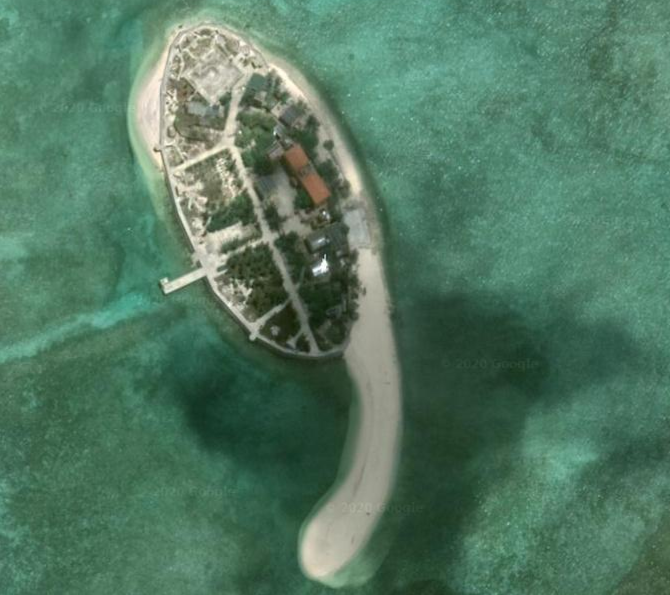
Sin Cowe East Island

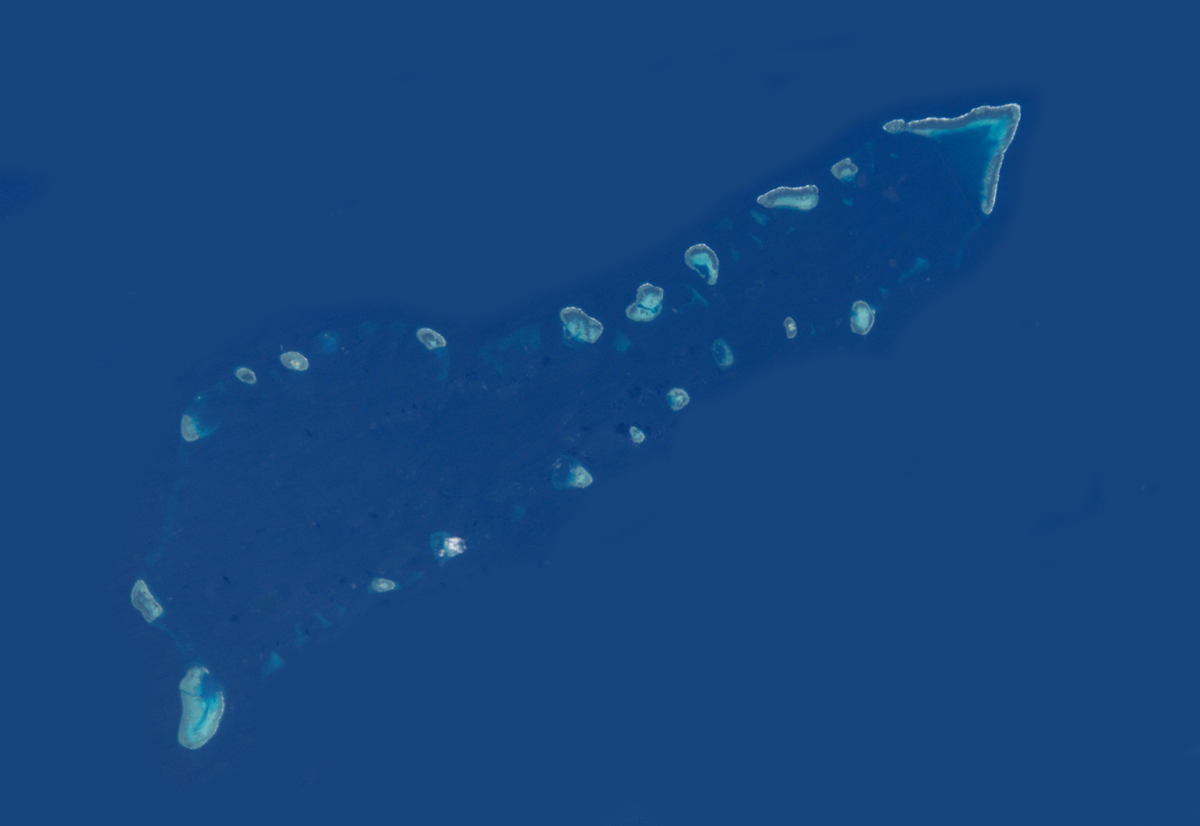

== See also ==
- Spratly Islands dispute
