= Ardasier Reef =

Reef in the South China Sea

Disputed reef
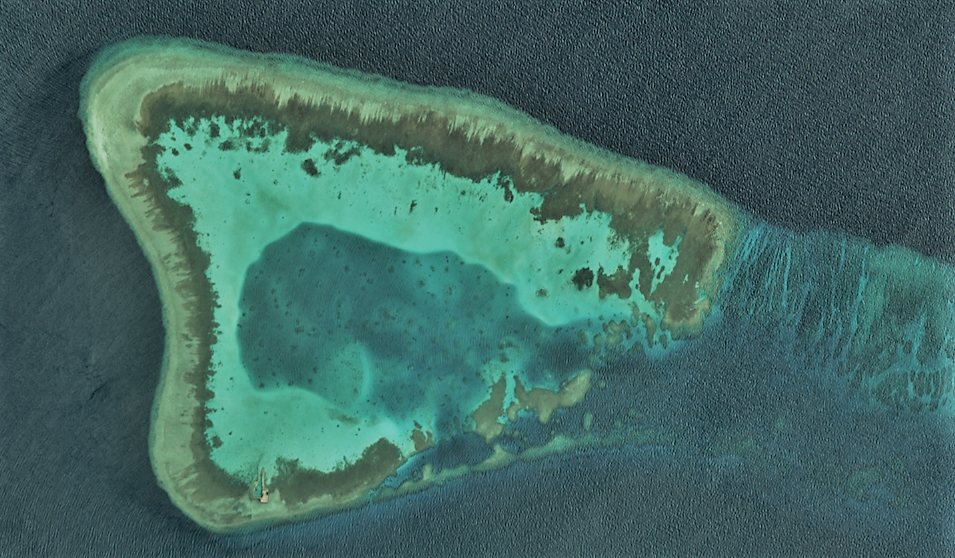
- Satellite image of Ardasier Reef by NASA.

- Location within Spratly Islands
- Other names: Terumbu Ubi (Malay); Antonio Luna Reef (Philippine English); Bahura ng Antonio Luna (Filipino) đá Kiêu Ngựa (Vietnamese) 光星仔礁 Guāngxīngzǐ Jiāo (Chinese)

Geography
- Location: South China Sea
- Coordinates: 7°37′19″N 113°51′39″E; 7.62194°N 113.86083°E
- Archipelago: Spratly Islands

Administration
- Malaysia
- State: Sabah

Claimed by
- China
- City: Sansha, Hainan
- Taiwan
- Municipality: Cijin, Kaohsiung
- Vietnam
- District: Trường Sa, Khánh Hòa

Ardasier Reef (7°37′19″N 113°51′39″E), also known as Malay: Terumbu Ubi, lit. 'Yam Reef'; Antonio Luna Reef (Filipino: Bahura ng Antonio Luna); Vietnamese: đá Kiêu Ngựa; Mandarin Chinese: 光星仔礁; pinyin: Guāngxīngzǐ Jiāo, is a triangular shaped feature on the SW extremity of Dangerous Ground in the Spratly Islands.

It lies 26 km NNE of Swallow Reef, and 9 km east of Dallas Reef, with the large Ardasier Bank extending 69 km ENE. Ardasier Bank, a sunken atoll except for drying Ardasier Reef at its southwestern end, has a total area of 2347 km^{2}, and its former lagoon is up to 65 metres deep.

Ardasier Reef is steep-to, except on its eastern side where it adjoins the Ardasier Bank. Its huge areas of sandy patches have an abundance of shy Guitar Sharks, Eagle Rays, Giant Reef Rays and other intriguing bottom dwelling creatures that bury themselves in the sand.

It is one of the areas in the Spratly Islands occupied by Malaysia. The Royal Malaysian Navy has maintained an "offshore naval station" there called "Station Uniform", since 1986. The Filipino name is named after Philippine revolutionary general, Antonio Luna.
