= Mariveles Reef =

Disputed atoll
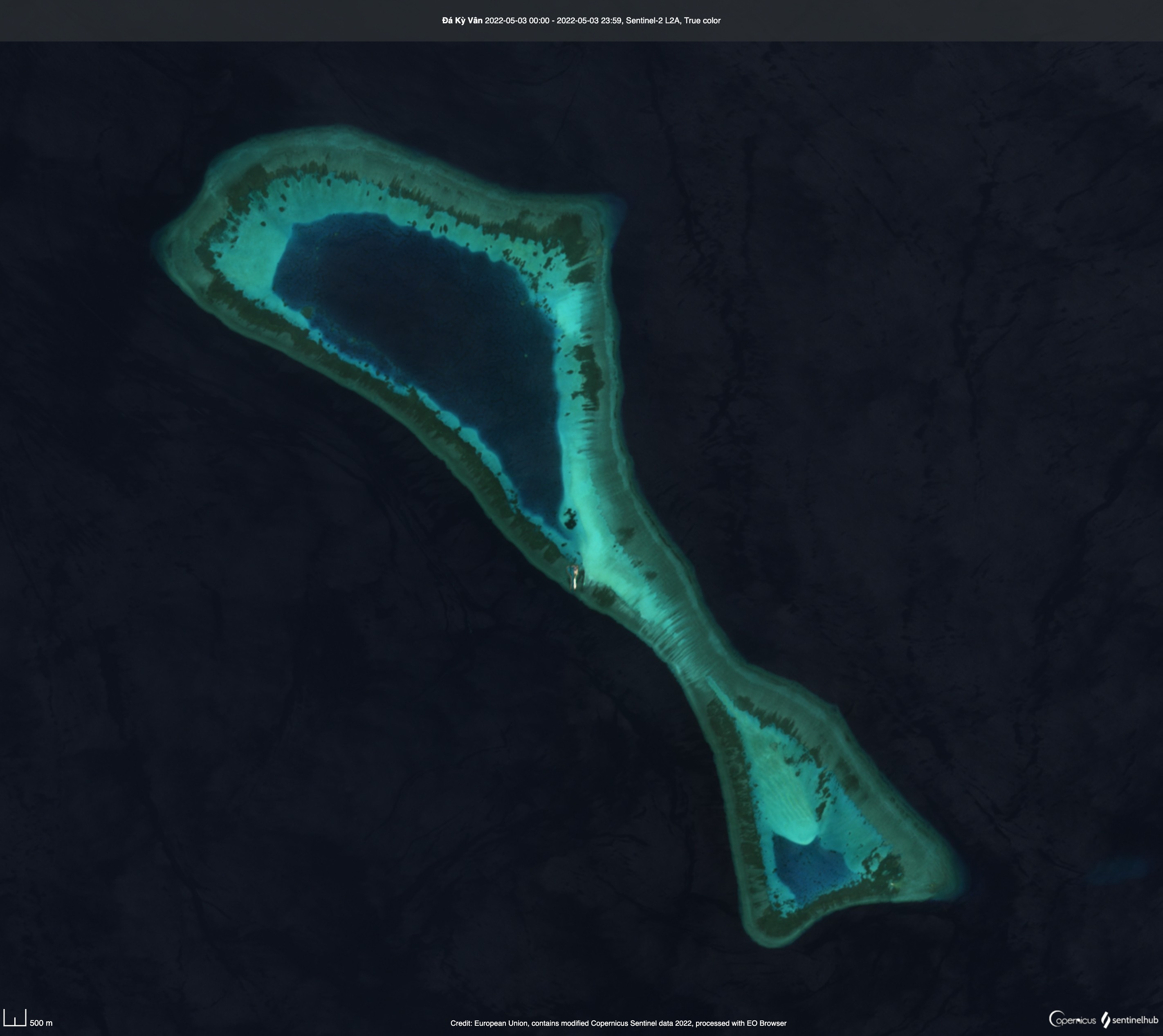
- Satellite image of Mariveles Reef.

- Location within Spratly Islands
- Other names: Terumbu Mantanani (Malay); Bahura ng Mariveles (Filipino); Đá Kỳ Vân (Vietnamese) 南海礁 Nánhǎi Jiāo (Chinese)

Geography
- Location: South China Sea
- Coordinates: 7°59′38″N 113°53′42″E
- Archipelago: Spratly Islands

Administration
- Malaysia
- State: Sabah

Claimed by
- China
- City: Sansha, Hainan
- Philippines
- Municipality: Kalayaan, Palawan
- Taiwan
- Municipality: Cijin District, Kaohsiung
- Vietnam
- District: Trường Sa District, Khánh Hòa

Mariveles Reef (Malay: Terumbu Mantanani; Filipino: Bahura ng Mariveles; Vietnamese: đá Kỳ Vân; Mandarin Chinese: 南海礁; pinyin: Nánhǎi Jiāo), is located in the SW of Dangerous Ground in the Spratly Islands. It is 59 kilometres (37 mi) slightly east of north from Swallow Reef and 35 nautical miles (65 km; 40 mi) southeast of Barque Canada Reef.

It dries at high tide enclosing two large lagoons in a figure of eight formation with a sand cay between them. This small cay, 1.5–2 metres (4 ft 11 in – 6 ft 7 in) high, and some isolated rocks are just visible at high water.

It is one of the areas in the Spratly Islands occupied by Malaysia. The Royal Malaysian Navy has maintained an "offshore naval station" there called "Station Mike" since 1986. The atoll is also claimed by the People's Republic of China, Republic of China (Taiwan), the Philippines, and Vietnam.
