= Investigator Shoal =

Atoll in South China Sea

Disputed atoll
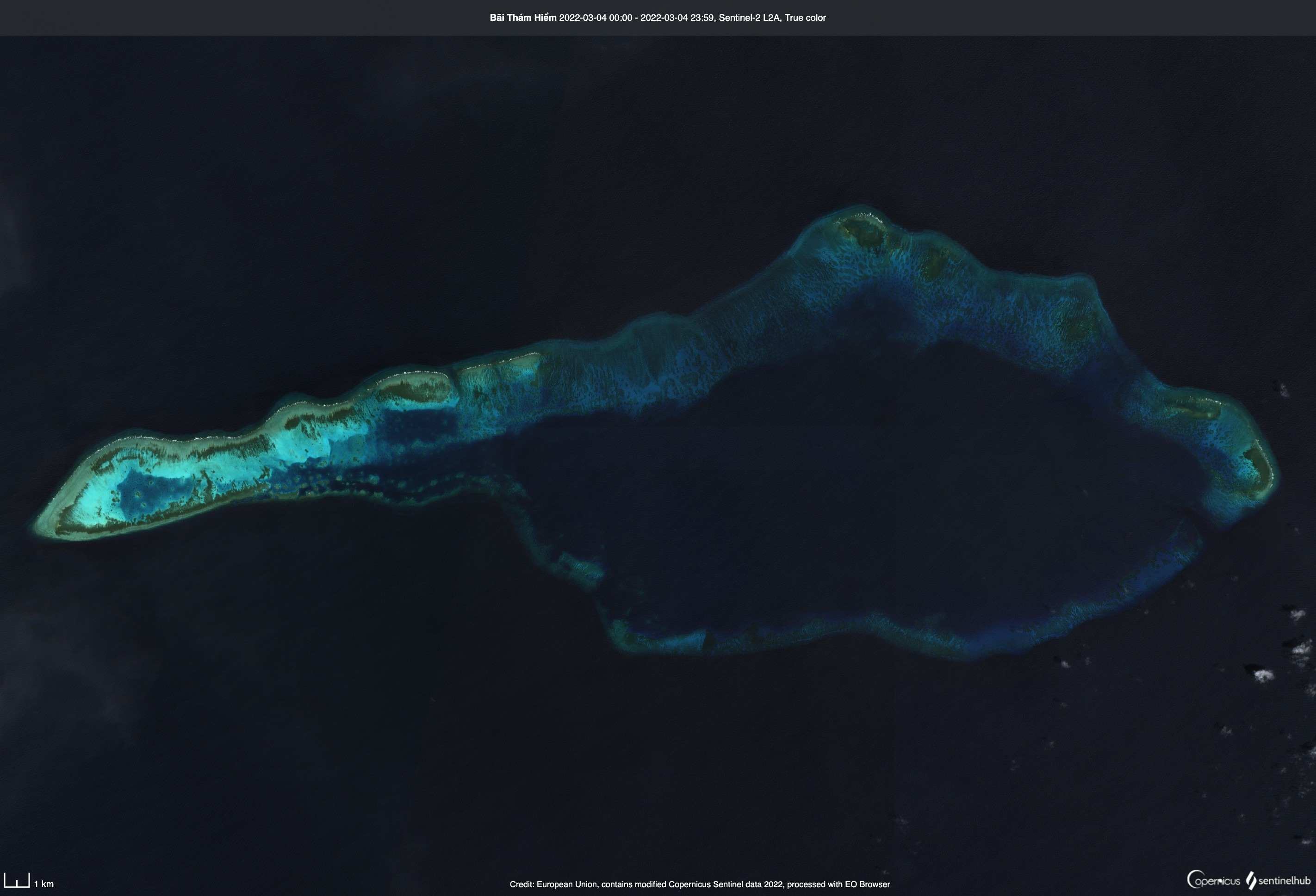
- Satellite image of Investigator Shoal.

- Location within Spratly Islands
- Other names: Terumbu Peninjau (Malay); Pawikan Shoal (Philippine English); Buhanginan ng Pawikan (Filipino); Bãi Thám Hiểm (Vietnamese) 榆亚暗沙 Yúyà ànshā (Chinese)

Geography
- Location: South China Sea
- Coordinates: 8°6′51″N 114°42′7″E
- Archipelago: Spratly Islands

Administration
- Malaysia
- State: Sabah

Claimed by
- China
- City: Sansha, Hainan
- Philippines
- Municipality: Kalayaan, Palawan
- Taiwan
- Municipality: Cijin, Kaohsiung
- Vietnam
- District: Truong Sa, Khanh Hoa

Investigator Shoal, also known as Malay: Terumbu Peninjau; Pawikan Shoal (Filipino: Buhanginan ng Pawikan, lit. 'Sandbank of Sea Turtle'); Vietnamese: bãi Thám Hiểm; chữ Nôm: 𣺽探險; Mandarin Chinese: 榆亞暗沙/榆亚暗沙; pinyin: Yúyà ànshā, is located in the southwest of Dangerous Ground in the Spratly Islands of the South China Sea.

It is an atoll above water at low tide; some large rocks at the western end might be visible at high water. The atoll is 32.1 kilometres (19.9 mi) and is up to 10.6 kilometres (6.6 mi) wide. The total atoll area is 188 square kilometres (73 sq mi). The lagoon is up to 45 metres (148 ft) deep.

It is one of the areas in the Spratly Islands occupied by Malaysia. The Royal Malaysian Navy has maintained an "offshore naval station" there called "Station Papa" since 1999.
