= Pearson Reef =

Island

Disputed atoll
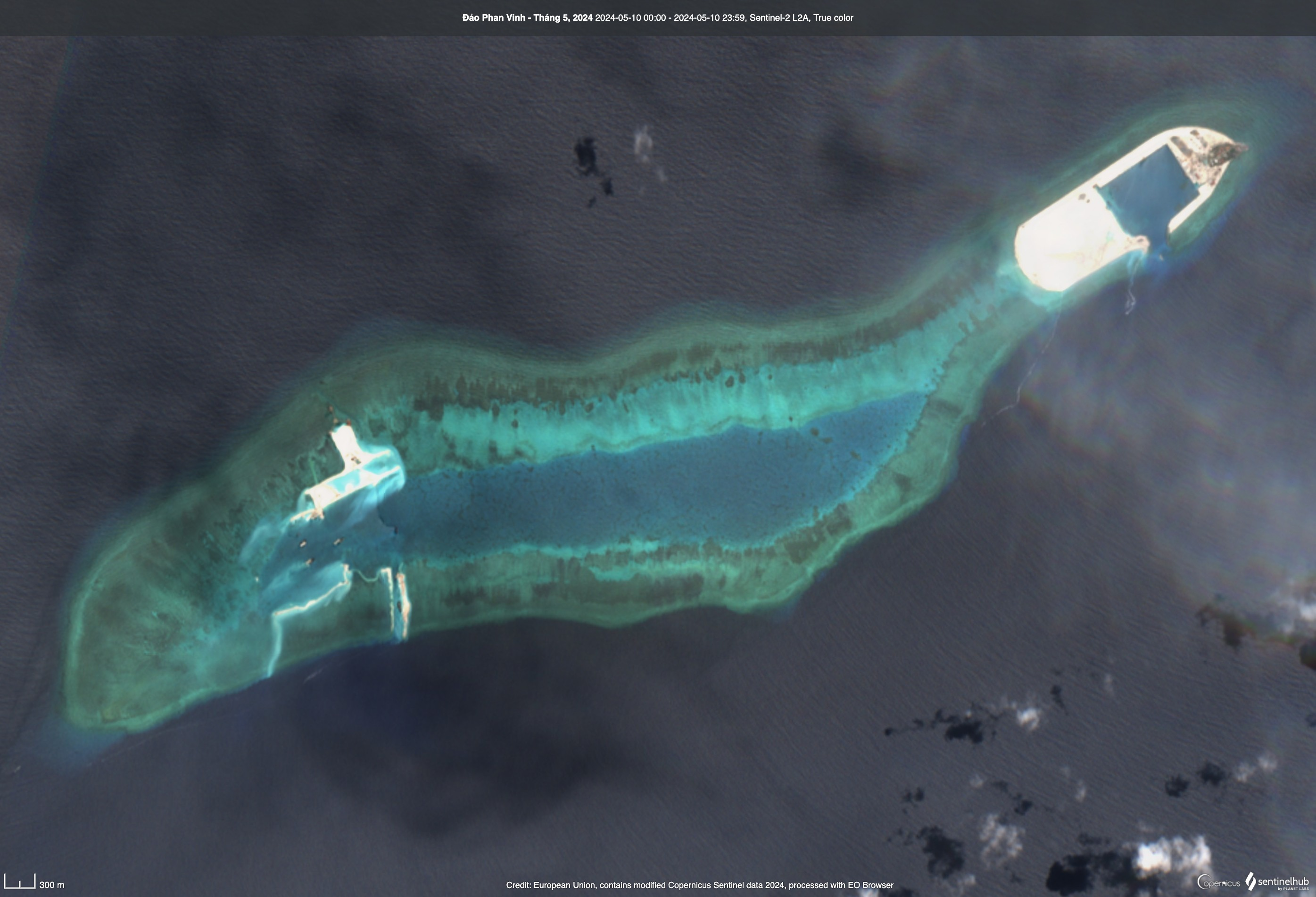
- Pearson Reef in 2024

- Location within Spratly Islands
- Other names: Rạn vòng Pearson, đảo Phan Vinh, đảo Phan Vinh B (Vietnamese); Hizon Reef (Philippine English); Bahura ng Hizon (Filipino) 毕生礁 Bìshēng jiāo (Chinese)

Geography
- Location: South China Sea
- Coordinates: 8°58′31″N 113°42′31″E
- Archipelago: Spratly Islands
- Total islands: 2
- Major islands: Phan Vinh Island; Phan Vinh B Island

Administration
- Vietnam
- District: Trường Sa District
- Township: Trường Sa Township

Claimed by
- China
- Philippines
- Taiwan
- Vietnam

Additional information
- Area codes: Phan Vinh Island: 58 ha Phan Vinh B Island: 20 ha

Pearson Reef (Filipino: Bahura ng Hizon, Chinese: 毕生礁; pinyin: Bìshēng jiāo), called Phan Vinh Island (Vietnamese: đảo Phan Vinh) in Vietnam, is an atoll of the Spratly Islands in the South China Sea. The atoll has been occupied by Vietnam since 1978. It is claimed by China (PRC), the Philippines, Vietnam, and Taiwan (ROC).

== Characteristic ==
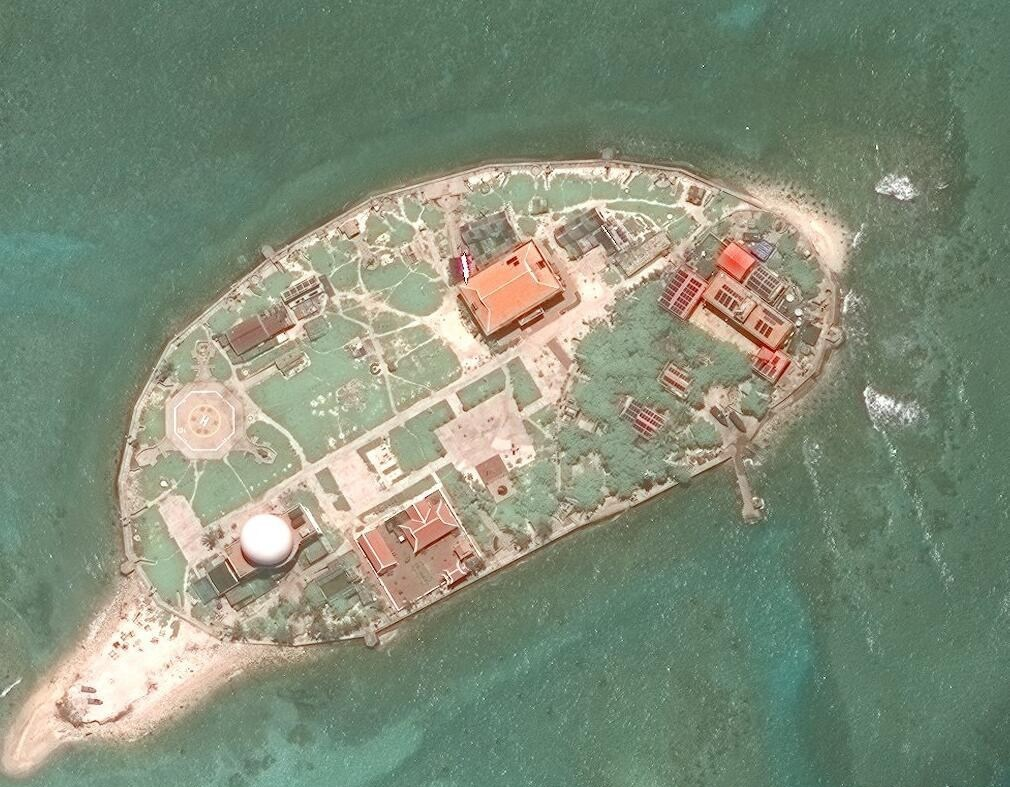
Phan Vinh Island (Đảo Phan Vinh)

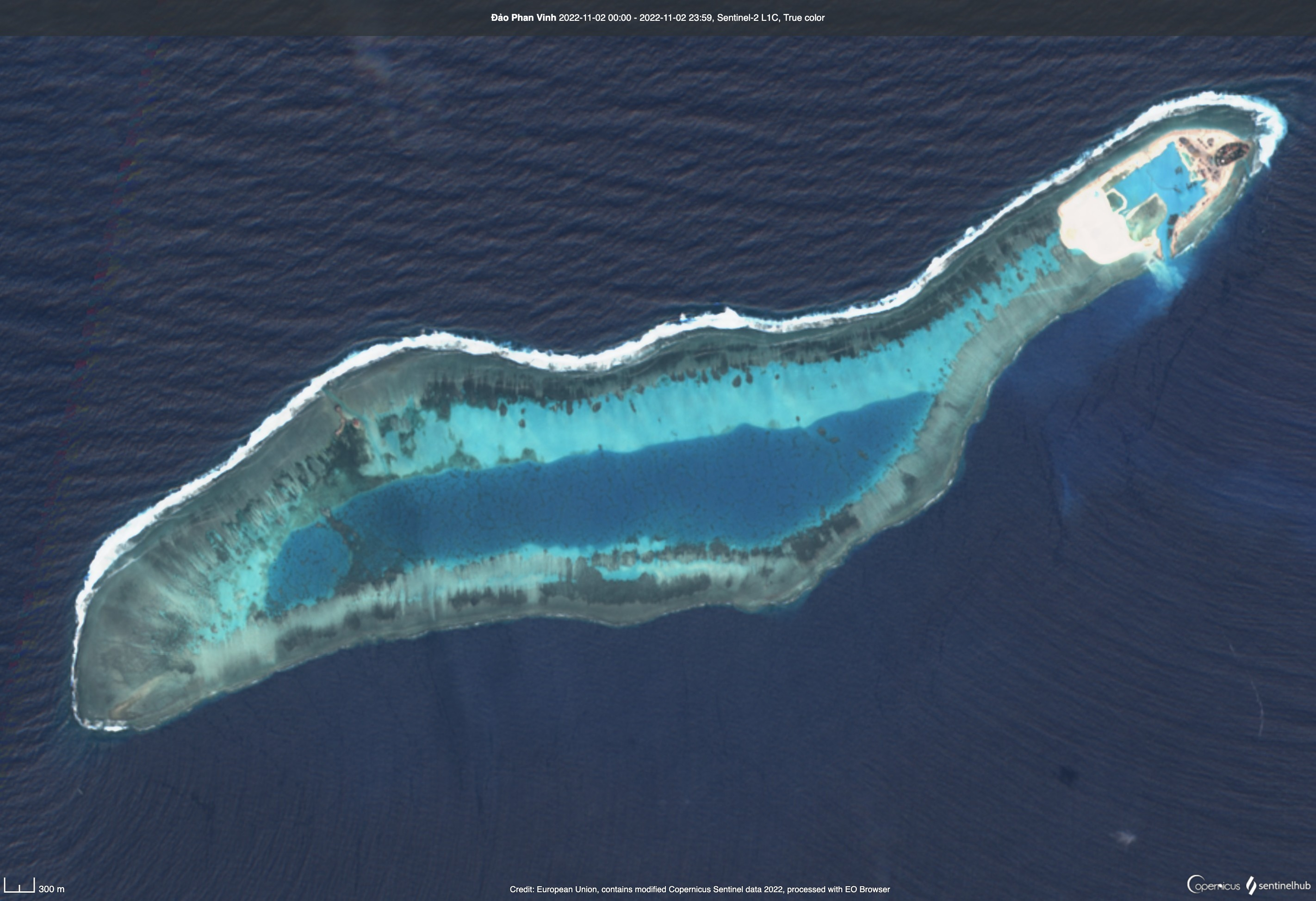
Pearson Reef in 2022

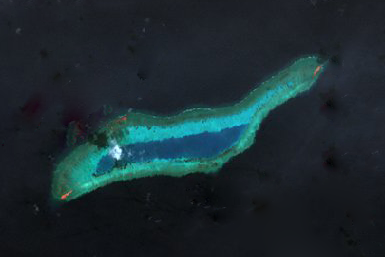
Pearson Reef in 1999

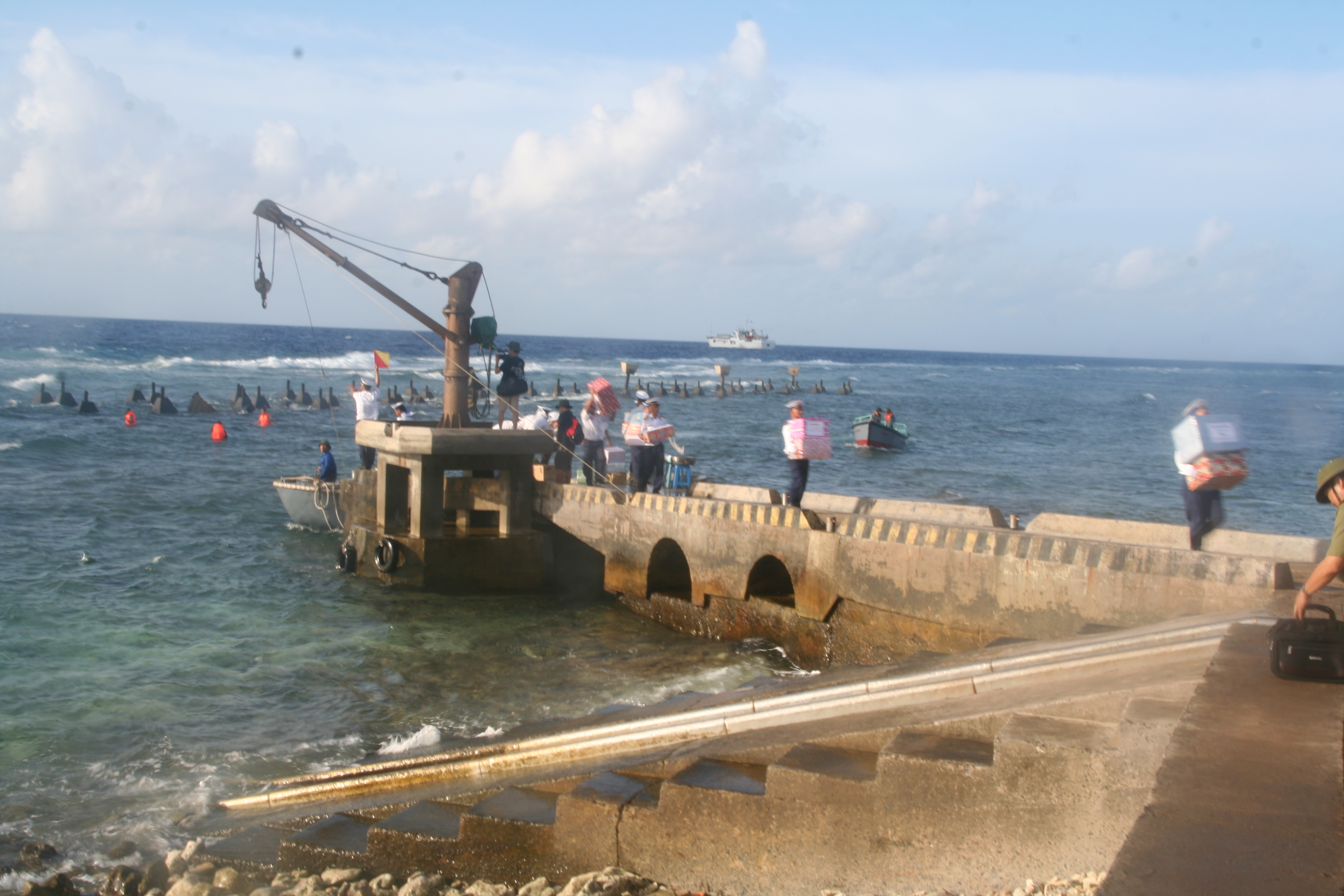
Pier on Phan Vinh Island

Pearson Reef is about 9 km long and about 1.8 km wide and in the middle there is an enclosed lagoon 3 to 6 metres (9.8 to 19.7 ft) deep. The total area of this coral reef is 14.75 square kilometres (5.70 sq mi), of which the area of the reef is 2.72 square kilometres (1.05 sq mi).

To the northeast of Pearson Reef is a floating island, named Phan Vinh Island (đảo Phan Vinh), formerly known as Hon Sap Island (Đảo Hòn Sập) in Vietnam. The island has an annular shape. It has a length of 290 metres (950 ft), a width of 140 metres (460 ft) and lies on a 4.9 nautical miles (9.1 km; 5.6 mi) long coral reef that also follows the northeast-southwest axis. The island has a natural area of about 2.4 hectares (5.9 acres). The island belongs to the Spratly cluster (cụm Trường Sa) of the Spratly Island and is located about 14.5 nautical miles (26.9 km; 16.7 mi) northwest of Alison Reef (Toc Tan Reef, đá Tốc Tan). In October 2021, Vietnam started dredging and expanding the accretion at 3 features: Phan Vinh Island, Namyit Island and Sand Cay Island. According to images taken by the Sentinel-2 satellite (ESA), by June 2023, Phan Vinh Island has been expanded with an area of about 50 hectares (120 acres) of floating land, 1.6 kilometres (0.99 mi) long and 600 metres (2,000 ft) wide with a lock in the middle of the island.

At the southwest corner of this reef, there is a smaller island called Phan Vinh B Island (đảo Phan Vinh B) located to the west about 3.3 nautical miles (6.1 km; 3.8 mi) west-southwest of Phan Vinh Island, with coordinates 8°57′33″N 113°39′12″E. On Phan Vinh B Islet, there are 3 durable houses (built many years ago) that are linked together by a wide concrete road and have a helipad for helicopters to take off and land in case of rescue missions.

== Environment and infrastructure ==
Phan Vinh Island does not have a fresh water source, but there are some green trees such as putat, beach casuarina, bayhops, portia tree, banyan, etc.

On Phan Vinh Island, there are ways of civil works such as wind and solar power systems, cultural houses, clinics, etc.

There is a religious establishment on the island, Vinh Phuc Pagoda (chùa Vinh Phúc).

Vietnam has built Radar Station 44 (T44) on Phan Vinh Island, which can be observed within a radius of 300 kilometres (190 mi) of the entire Spratly Islands in the South China Sea.

== History ==
Pearson Reef was first observed by Pearson, commander of the Bahamian, in 1843.

Before 1978, Phan Vinh Island was named Hon Sap Island by Vietnam. At the beginning of 1978, the situation in the Spratly Islands was complicated, the Philippines sent troops to occupy An Nhon reef (formerly known as Lan Can reef), some countries sent many ships to the Truong Sa archipelago. The Vietnamese Navy decided to quickly organize forces to keep the islands of Central London Reef, Sin Cowe East Island, Phan Vinh Island and Amboyna Cay.

On March 30, 1978, a detachment of 31 people from Regiment 146, Naval Region 4, commanded by Second Lieutenant Vũ Xuân Hà, accompanied by Regiment Commander Cao Ánh Đăng aboard ship 680 of Division 128 was stationed Phan Vinh Island.

"Phan Vinh Island" as Vietnamese call it, comes from the name of the Hero of the People's Armed Forces, Lieutenant Nguyễn Phan Vinh (1933 – 1968, native of Dien Ban, Quang Nam), who was the captain of many numberless ship in the Vietnam War.

In 2022, news reports indicated that the Vietnamese government was engaged in dredging and landfill operations to expand the size of Pearson Reef (Phan Vinh Island), Namyit Island, and Sand Cay. The total area of the land reclaimed of Phan Vinh Island in 2024, in this operations to be 58 hectares. From October 2023, Vietnam will begin to expand Phan Vinh B Island. In the future, the area of this island may exceed Phan Vinh Island.

== See also ==
- Spratly Islands dispute
