= Tennent Reef =

Island in the South China Sea

Disputed atoll
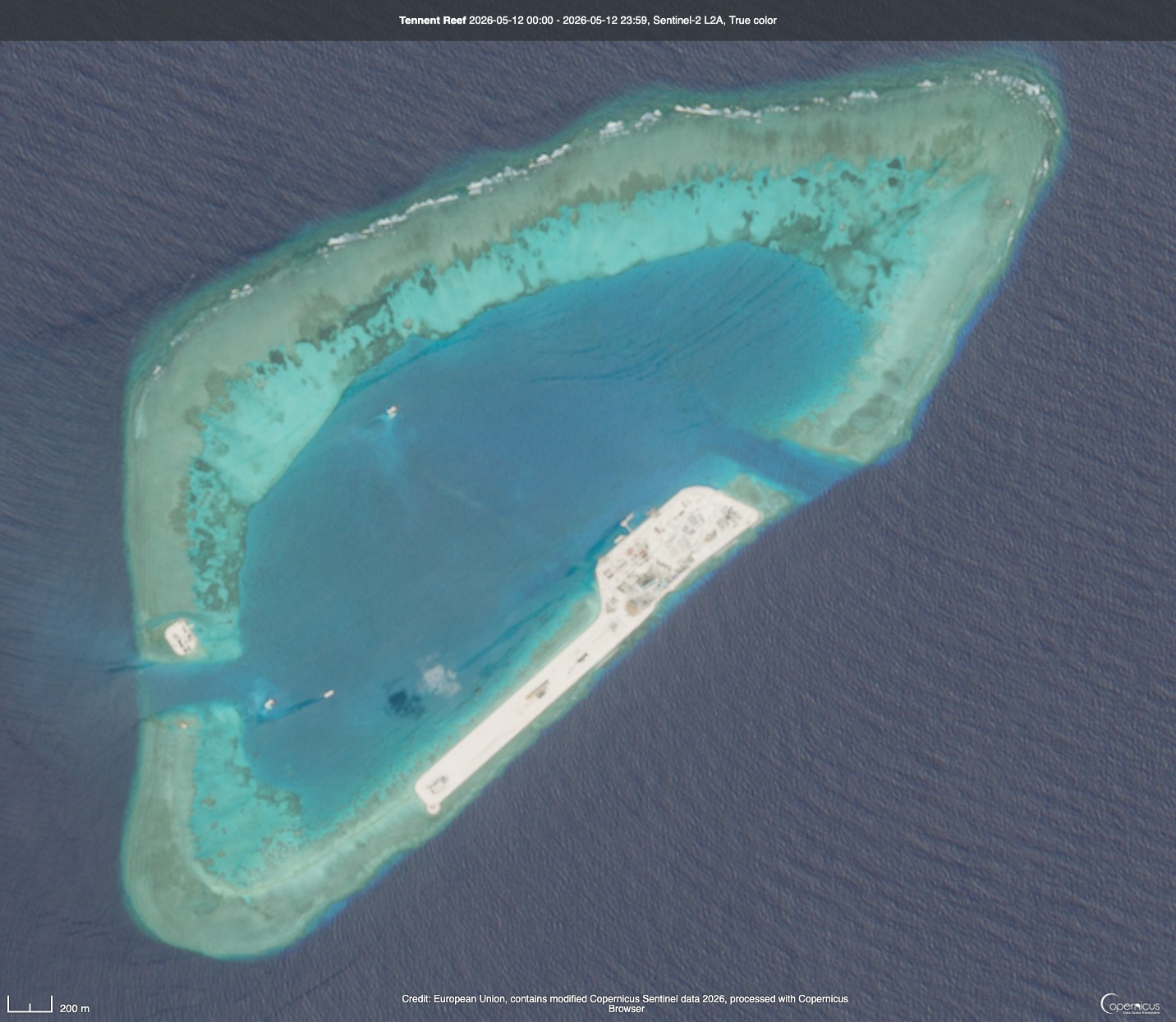
- Tennent Reef

- Location within Spratly Islands
- Other names: Pigeon Reef; Đá Tiên Nữ (Vietnamese); Lopez-Jaena Reef (Philippine English); Bahura ng Lopez-Jaena (Filipino) 无乜礁 Wúmiē jiāo (Chinese)

Geography
- Location: South China Sea
- Coordinates: 8°51′18″N 114°39′18″E
- Archipelago: Spratly Islands
- Total islands: 2
- Major islands: Tien Nu A Island, Tien Nu B Island
- Area: Tien Nu B Island: 55 ha Tien Nu A Island: 2.5 ha

Administration
- Vietnam
- District: Trường Sa District
- Township: Trường Sa Township

Claimed by
- China
- Philippines
- Taiwan
- Vietnam

Tennent Reef, also known as Pigeon Reef, (Filipino: Bahura ng Lopez-Jaena); Tiên Nữ Reef (Vietnamese: Đá Tiên Nữ, lit. 'Fairy Rock or Andromeda Rock'); Mandarin Chinese: 无乜礁; pinyin: Wúmiē jiāo, is an atoll on the Spratly Islands in the South China Sea. The atoll has been occupied by Vietnam since 1988. It is also claimed by China (PRC), the Philippines, Vietnam, and Taiwan (ROC).

== Characteristics ==
=== Geography ===
Tennent Reef is the easternmost entity among the geographical features controlled by Vietnam in the Spratly Islands. It is located 100 kilometres (62 mi) south of the Union Banks, 162 nautical miles (300 km; 186 mi) east of Spratly Island, and 27 nautical miles (50 km; 31 mi) east-northeast of the nearest entity managed by Vietnam, Cornwallis South Reef.

Tennent Reef has a triangular shape, with its three sides measuring approximately 3.3 kilometres (2.1 mi), 5.7 kilometres (3.5 mi), and 6.7 kilometres (4.2 mi). When the tide recedes to 0.1 metres (3.9 in), the entire outer edge of the coral emerges above the sea surface. The total area of this atoll is around 15.56 square kilometres (6.01 sq mi), including a lagoon covering 5.93 square kilometres (2.29 sq mi).

The easternmost point of Tennent Reef is located at 8°52′31″N 114°41′01″E. And this is also the easternmost maritime point of Vietnam.

=== Island belong ===
- Tien Nu A Island (before 2021, it was called Tien Nu Islet): 8°51′00″N 114°38′20″E, located at the western part of Tennent Reef. Including a permanent building and a multi-functional cultural house. This islet began its expansion through land reclamation in April 2024, reaching an area of approximately 2.5 hectares (6.2 acres) and transforming into an island.
- Tien Nu B Island: 8°51′13.9″N 114°39′50.9″E, located at the eastern part of Tennent Reef. This island has been undergoing land reclamation since December 2021. As of now, it covers an area of approximately 55 hectares (140 acres). Vietnam has the potential to construct a runway on this island.

== Lighthouse ==
In 2000, Vietnam built a lighthouse on the eastern side of Tennent Reef, geographic coordinates: 8°52′16.1″N 114°40′50.8″E. The tower stands over 22 metres (72 ft) tall and is entirely painted lemon yellow. Its base consists of a three-story building, located 5.2 kilometres (3.2 mi) from Tien Nu A Island, where the Vietnamese Navy maintains a garrison.

The lighthouse emits a flashing light with a characteristic 2+1 group pattern, following a 10-second cycle. Its effective range is 14 nautical miles (26 km; 16 mi) during the day and 15 nautical miles (28 km; 17 mi) at night.

== History ==
In late 1987 and early 1988, the Vietnam People's Navy planned to deploy forces to occupy Tennent Reef, Discovery Great Reef, West London Reef, and Fiery Cross Reef. However, China moved ahead and seized Fiery Cross Reef on January 26, 1988.

On January 25, 1988, the HQ-613 vessel from Vietnam's Naval Region 4 transported Brigade 146 and Engineer Regiment 83 to Tien Nu Islet (today, it is called Tien Nu A Island), where they built stilt houses and organized island defense. By February 6, 1988, the stationed forces had completed level-3 housing and continued to hold their position on the island.

On 13 October 1999, a Philippine aircraft flying too low to observe a three-story infrastructure on the Tennent Reef were fired upon by Vietnamese gunners stationed at the garrison, the aircraft returned safely. Two weeks later, the Philippine government protested the incident, while the Vietnamese government told that their soldiers only fired warning shots as the aircraft was flying too close for comfort.

== See also ==
- Spratly Islands dispute
