= Ladd Reef =

Reef in the Spratly Islands, South China Sea

Disputed reef
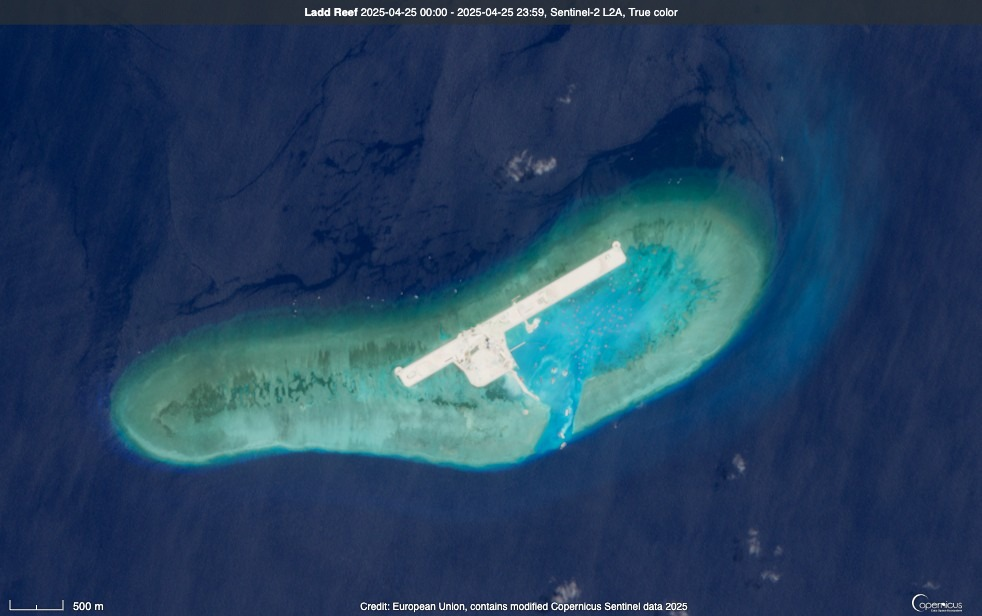
- Ladd Reef and Da Lat Island

- Location within Spratly Islands
- Other names: Đá Lát (Vietnamese) 日積礁 / 日积礁 Rìjī Jiāo (Chinese)

Geography
- Location: South China Sea
- Coordinates: 8°39′57″N 111°40′36″E
- Archipelago: Spratly Islands
- Total islands: 1
- Major islands: Da Lat Island
- Area: 0.55 km^{2} (0.21 sq mi)

Administration
- Vietnam
- District: Trường Sa District
- Township: Trường Sa Township

Claimed by
- China
- Taiwan
- Vietnam

Ladd Reef (Vietnamese: Đảo Đá Lát; Mandarin Chinese: 日積礁/日积礁; pinyin: Rìjī Jiāo) is a Vietnam-controlled reef in the Spratly group of islands, South China Sea. China (PRC) and Taiwan (ROC) are also claimants of the reef. Like Spratly Island, Ladd Reef lies to the west of the Philippines-defined "Kalayaan Islands" claim area.

== Names ==
The English name Ladd Reef was coined by Richard Spratly in late March 1843, after Captain Ladd of the ship Austen, who seemed to be the first to have seen the reef. The Chinese name Rìjī Jiāo was coined in 1947 to replace the 1935 name Lādé Jiāo (拉德礁), which was transliterated from the English name Ladd.

== Geography ==
Ladd Reef lies west of Dangerous Ground in the western half of the Spratly Islands, to the south of Coronation Bank, southwest of West London Reef (West Reef) and 15 nautical miles (28 km; 17 mi) west of Spratly Island.

This coral reef lies on a northeast-southwest axis, 3 nautical miles (5.6 km; 3.5 mi) in length, 1 nautical mile (1.9 km; 1.2 mi) in width, and spans over an area of 9.9 square kilometres (990 ha; 2,400 acres; 3.8 sq mi). It is entirely submerged during high tide, but there are some stones jutting out of the sea during low tide.

== Da Lat Island (Đảo Đá Lát) ==
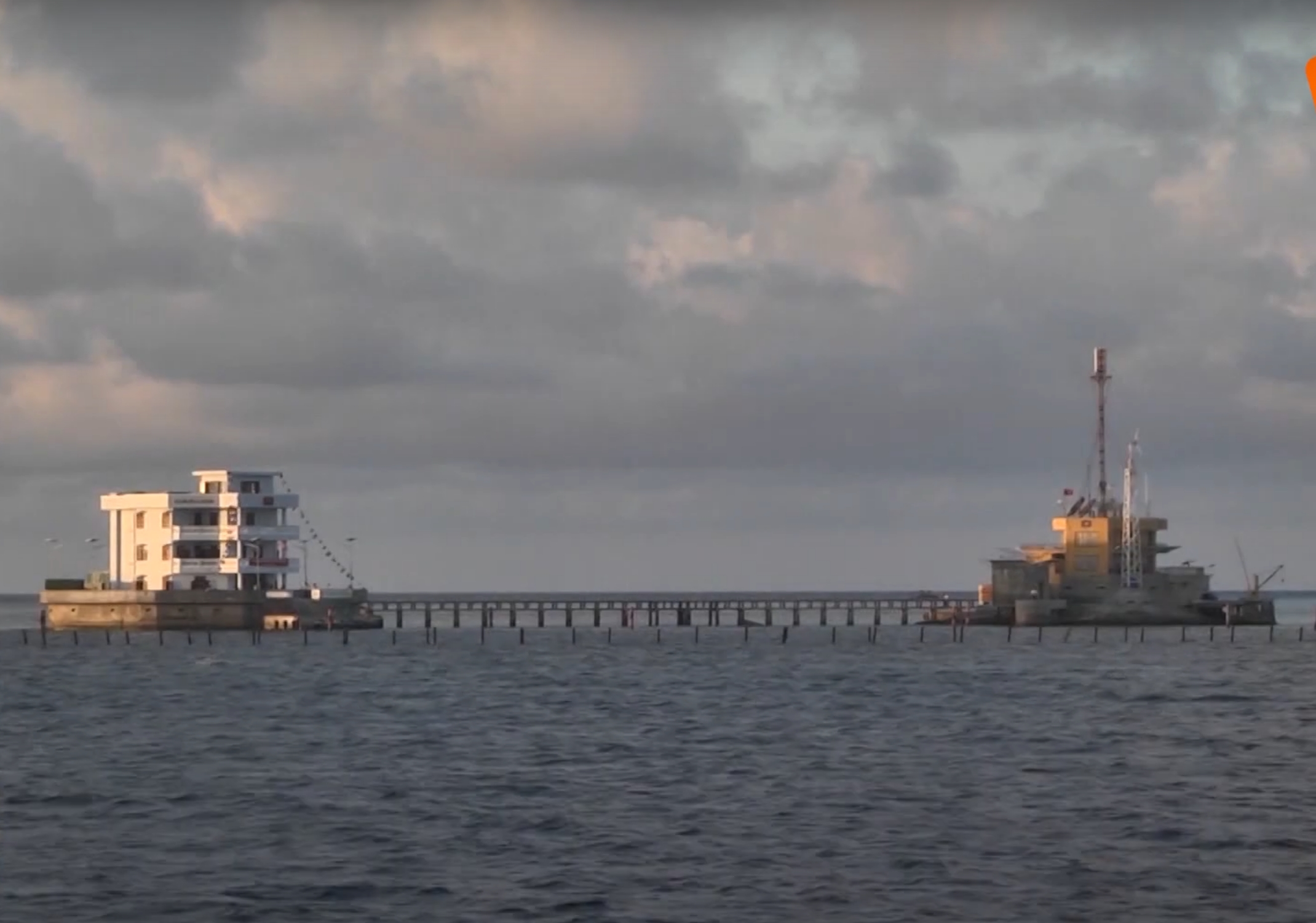
Before the land reclamation, Da Lat Island consisted of a permanent house on the right and a multifunctional cultural house on the left. The sovereignty marker was placed at the durable house.

Da Lat Island, formerly known as Da Lat Islet, is the only islet situated on a coral reef. Initially, a permanent house was constructed on the island to serve as a station for the Vietnamese Navy. In 2018, a multifunctional cultural house was built there and was completed in October of the same year.

The geographical coordinates of this island, as recorded on the sovereignty marker, are 8°40′10″N 111°40′23″E (or 8.66944°N 111.67306°E). This location places it within the strategic and ecologically significant region of the South China Sea.

In early November 2022, Vietnam began land reclamation and renovation to transform Da Lat Islet into Da Lat Island. As of March 2025, Da Lat Island has an estimated reclaimed land area of around 55 hectares, stretching approximately 2.4 kilometers in length, with the potential for an airport to be constructed there.

== Structures ==
The reef is uninhabited but contains a Vietnamese lighthouse (built in 1994) with the inscription Hải đăng Đá Lát (literally "Ladd Reef Lighthouse"). The lower portion of the lighthouse consists of quarters for a handful of Vietnamese soldiers and the lighthouse keeper.

== Other information ==
On 8 July 1945, towards the end of the Second World War, a Dutch submarine (HNLMS O-19) was en route to Subic Bay in the Philippines at a speed of 16 knots (30 km/h; 18 mph) when it struck the reef. Unable to pull free, the crew of O 19 were rescued by the U.S. submarine USS Cod. To prevent capture, O 19 was scuttled by the crews using explosives, torpedoes and gunfire. By the late 1990s, the wreck had mostly been scrapped by local salvagers, and the few pieces that remained were heavily corroded.
