= Trường Sa (township) =

Trường Sa Thị trấn Trường Sa
- Commune-level town (Class-5)
- Trường Sa Town
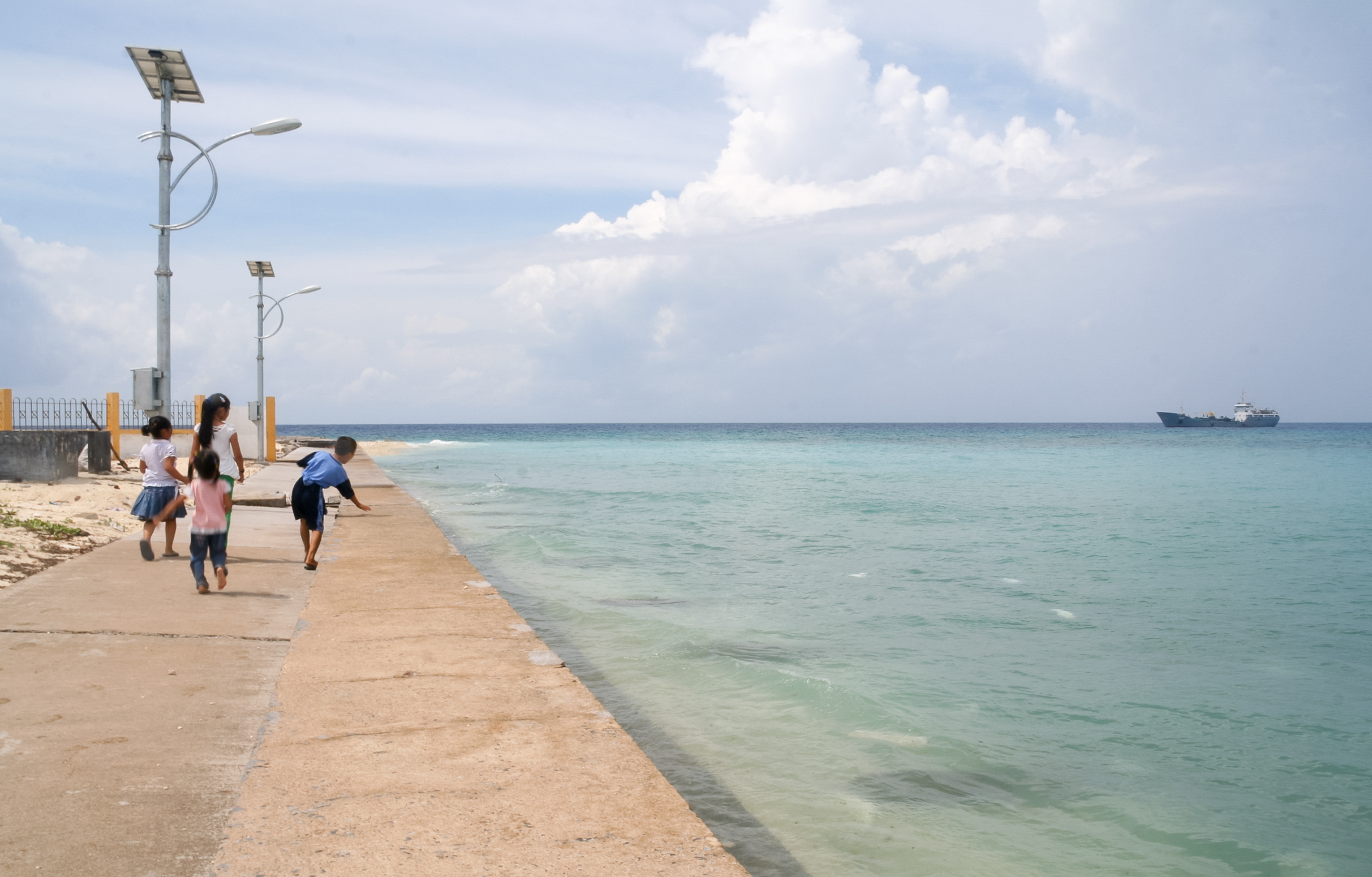
- Spratly Island

- Location within South China Sea
- Coordinates: 8°38′41″N 111°55′12″E
- Country: Vietnam
- Region: South China Sea
- Province: Khánh Hòa
- District: Trường Sa

Population (2019)
  - Total: 31
- Time zone: UTC+7 (UTC + 7)

Trường Sa is a former commune-level town (thị trấn) and capital of Trường Sa District, Khánh Hòa Province, Vietnam.

The town consists of Spratly Island and nearby islands, reefs and banks.

== History ==
The town was established on April 11, 2007 under the Vietnam Government's Decree 65/2007/NĐ-CP.

== Traffic ==
The town has a regional airport, Truong Sa Airport, with a runway length of 1,200 m that can accommodate small planes to transport people and necessities as well as transport patients to the mainland. The airport management and technical assurance department is in charge of the General Staff Department, Division 370.

The town also has a lock with many piers that can accommodate many boats at the same time.

== Islands and atolls belong ==
=== Islands ===
S. No.	Island name	Vietnamese name	in Atoll	Area (ha)	Image	Note
1	Spratly Island	Đảo Trường Sa Lớn	Spratly Island's surrounding reef.	36.5		Spratly Island and West Reef East Island are the only two islands of Truong Sa town inhabited by civilians. People here make a living by fishing at sea and raising livestock, but some food still has to be imported from the mainland. On the sunken and floating islands, cows relax under the shade of trees, flocks of saltwater ducks search for food on the beach, dogs catch fish with soldiers, lush green vegetable gardens, and flocks of fish swim around the wharf. like at home's pond, square almond trees, maple trees, ancient storm trees fragrant with flowers... All those peaceful images are no different from a picture of a vibrant countryside on the mainland.
2	West Reef East Island	Đảo Đá Tây A	West London Reef	11		
3	Da Lat Island	Đảo Đá Lát	Ladd Reef	57		In early November 2022, Vietnam began accreting and renovating Da Lat Island into an artificial island.
4	Truong Sa Dong Island	Đảo Trường Sa Đông	Central London Reef	25		Truong Sa Dong Island is a small sand island in Central London Reef
5	Phan Vinh Island	Đảo Phan Vinh	Pearson Reef	58		Phan Vinh Island is a small sandy island belonging to Pearson Reef. Today, Vietnam has built up a large island with an area 13 times its natural area. In the illustration is the original island (natural).
6	Phan Vinh B Island	Đảo Phan Vinh B	Pearson Reef	55		From October 2023, Vietnam will begin to expand Phan Vinh B Island. In the future, the area of this island may exceed Phan Vinh Island.
7	Nui Le A Island	Đảo Núi Le A	Cornwallis South Reef	5		At the end of October 2022, Vietnam continued to expand this island and planted many coconut trees on it.
8	Toc Tan A Island	Đảo Tốc Tan A	Alison Reef	2		In early December 2022, Vietnam began conducting dredging and accretion activities on Toc Tan A Island. As of November 2023, Toc Tan A has become an artificial island with an area of about 2 hectares, about 150 m long, about 140 m wide, with a jetty on the south side.
9	Tien Nu A Island	Đảo Tiên Nữ A	Tennent Reef	2		After expanding Tien Nu B Island for about 3 years, Vietnam started expanding Tien Nu A Island in April 2024.
10	Tien Nu B Island	Đảo Tiên Nữ B	Tennent Reef	53		This island is the easternmost point in the sea of Vietnam. The area of this island is 53 hectares to date.
11	Thuyen Chai Island	Đảo Thuyền Chài	Barque Canada Reef	230		Thuyen Chai Island is a newly built artificial island by Vietnam located on Barque Canada Reef. This is also the largest island (both natural and artificial) occupied and controlled by Vietnam.
12	Amboyna Cay	Đảo An Bang	Amboyna Cay's surrounding reef.	1.6		The island’s coral structure is steep and the island often has big waves. Therefore, it is very difficult to get in and out of the island, even though the wind is only at level 3 or 4; some ships have to turn back or wait for calm waves to get to the island.

=== Atolls ===
S. No.	Reef name	Vietnamese Name	Image
1	Ladd Reef	Đá Lát	
2	West London Reef	Đá Tây	
3	Central London Reef	Đá Giữa	
4	East London Reef	Đá Đông	
5	Pearson Reef	Rạn vòng Pearson	
6	Alison Reef	Đá Tốc Tan	
7	Cornwallis South Reef	Đá Núi Le	
8	Tennent Reef	Đá Tiên Nữ	
9	Barque Canada Reef	Bãi Thuyền Chài	

== See also ==
- Spratly Island
