= Trường Sa, Khánh Hòa =

Special zone in Khánh Hòa province, Vietnam

Trường Sa
- Special zone
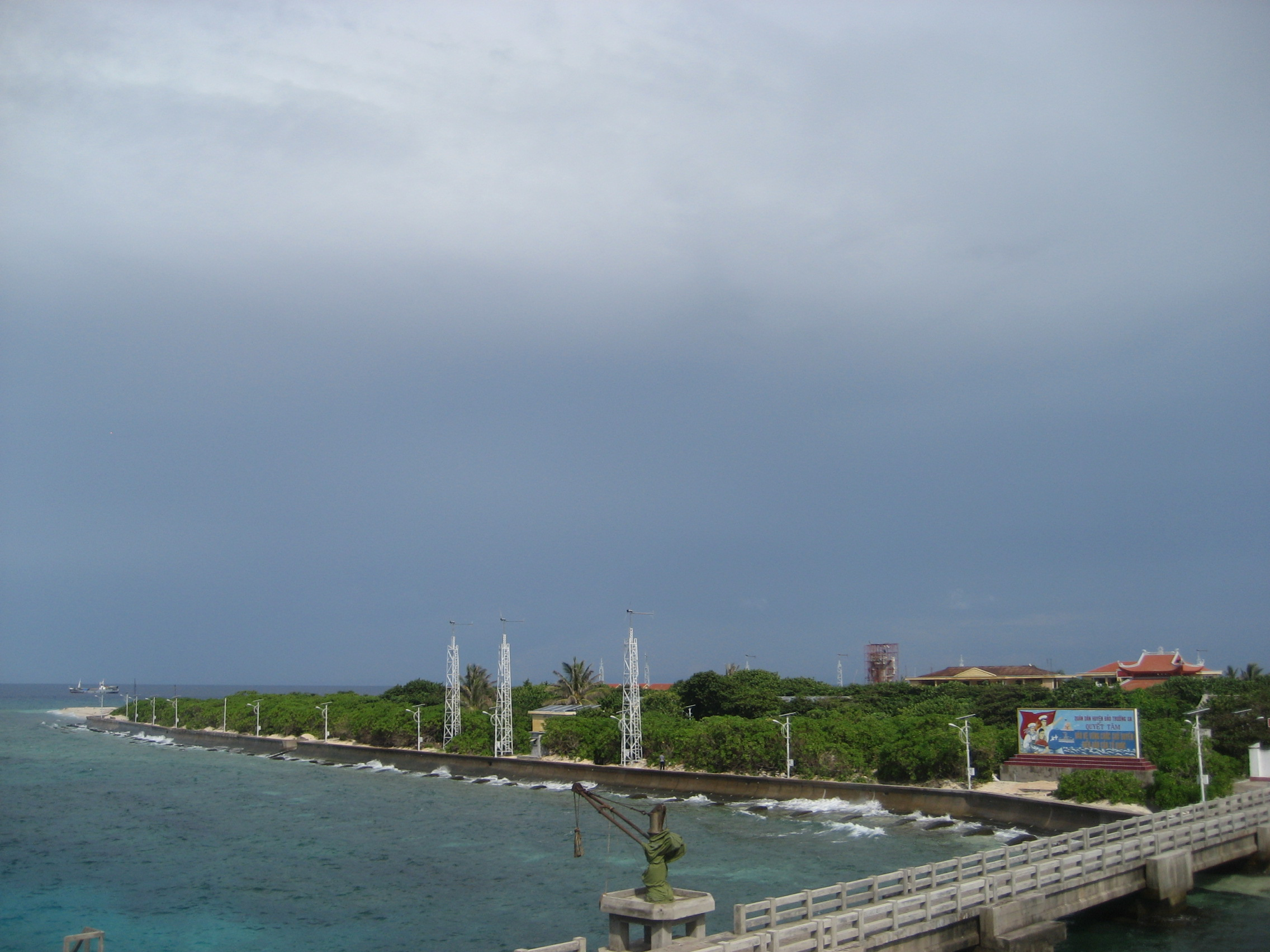

- Location within South China Sea
- Coordinates: 8°38′30″N 111°55′55″E
- Country: Vietnam
- Region: South Central Coast and Central Highlands
- Province: Khánh Hòa
- Established: June 16, 2025

Government
  - Chairman of People's Committee: Nguyễn Viết Thuân

Area
  - Total: 192 sq mi (496 km^{2})

Population (2019)
  - Total: 93
  - Density: 0.49/sq mi (0.19/km^{2})
- Time zone: UTC+7 (Indochina Time)
- Area code: 58

Trường Sa is an archipelago and a special zone of Khánh Hòa province in the South Central Coast region of Vietnam. Originally, a district (huyện) was established on the basis of the Spratly Islands (except Louisa Reef, Luconia Shoals and James Shoal), which is also claimed wholly or in part by Brunei, China, Malaysia, the Philippines and Taiwan. According to the 2019 census, the district has a population of 93 people.

== Geography ==
Trường Sa special administrative zone was established on the basis of small coral islands/cays, reefs and banks of the Spratly Islands which are 248 nautical miles (459 km; 285 mi) south east of Cam Ranh. As the islands contain a large number of scattered geographic entities, the special administrative zone is divided into eight clusters including Song Tử, Thị Tứ, Loại Ta, Nam Yết, Sinh Tồn, Trường Sa, Thám Hiểm and Bình Nguyên by Vietnam. On June 16th, 2025, through Resolution No. 1667/NQ of the Standing Committee of the National Assembly, the former Trường Sa district was reorganized into a special administrative zone.

Climate data for Trưòŉg Sa District
Month	Jan	Feb	Mar	Apr	May	Jun	Jul	Aug	Sep	Oct	Nov	Dec	Year
Record high °C (°F)	32.8 (91.0)	33.4 (92.1)	34.5 (94.1)	35.7 (96.3)	36.9 (98.4)	35.3 (95.5)	34.8 (94.6)	33.7 (92.7)	33.7 (92.7)	34.8 (94.6)	33.2 (91.8)	33.0 (91.4)	36.9 (98.4)
Mean daily maximum °C (°F)	28.0 (82.4)	28.9 (84.0)	30.3 (86.5)	31.7 (89.1)	31.9 (89.4)	30.9 (87.6)	30.3 (86.5)	30.3 (86.5)	30.2 (86.4)	30.2 (86.4)	29.7 (85.5)	28.4 (83.1)	30.1 (86.2)
Daily mean °C (°F)	26.5 (79.7)	26.8 (80.2)	27.9 (82.2)	29.0 (84.2)	29.4 (84.9)	28.7 (83.7)	28.3 (82.9)	28.3 (82.9)	28.2 (82.8)	28.1 (82.6)	27.8 (82.0)	26.9 (80.4)	28.0 (82.4)
Mean daily minimum °C (°F)	25.1 (77.2)	25.4 (77.7)	26.1 (79.0)	27.0 (80.6)	27.3 (81.1)	26.4 (79.5)	26.1 (79.0)	26.1 (79.0)	26.0 (78.8)	26.0 (78.8)	25.8 (78.4)	25.2 (77.4)	26.0 (78.8)
Record low °C (°F)	19.7 (67.5)	21.5 (70.7)	19.2 (66.6)	23.0 (73.4)	21.2 (70.2)	21.9 (71.4)	21.9 (71.4)	20.7 (69.3)	21.8 (71.2)	21.3 (70.3)	20.9 (69.6)	20.4 (68.7)	19.2 (66.6)
Average precipitation mm (inches)	160.1 (6.30)	80.2 (3.16)	83.1 (3.27)	59.4 (2.34)	125.7 (4.95)	222.8 (8.77)	247.4 (9.74)	250.6 (9.87)	257.8 (10.15)	328.4 (12.93)	388.2 (15.28)	461.9 (18.19)	2,684.9 (105.70)
Average rainy days	16.6	10.0	7.7	7.9	13.6	17.6	18.7	18.4	18.3	20.1	22.4	23.2	196.1
Average relative humidity (%)	85.5	84.3	81.7	79.7	79.5	81.4	82.3	83.2	83.0	82.7	84.4	86.1	82.9
Source: Vietnam Institute for Building Science and Technology

== Administrative history in the 20th century ==
- By the early 1930s, France had claimed the Spratly Islands. On 21 December 1933, Cochinchina's governor Jean-Félix Krautheimer signed Decree No. 4702-CP annexing Spratly Island, Amboyna Cay, Itu Aba Island, Northeast Cay, Southwest Cay, Thitu Island, Loaita Island and subsidiary islands into Bà Rịa province.
- On 22 October 1956, Republic of Vietnam's President Ngô Đình Diệm signed Decree No. 143-NV renaming provinces of South Vietnam. According to this decree, Bà Rịa–Vũng Tàu was renamed to Phước Tuy province under which the Spratly Islands were administered.
- On 6 September 1973, the Republic of Vietnam's Ministry of the Interior signed Decree No. 420-BNV/HCĐP/26, merging Spratly Island, Amboyna Cay, Itu Aba Island, Northeast Cay, Southwest Cay, Loaita Island, Thitu Island, Namyit Island, Sin Cowe Island and the surrounding islands into Phước Hải Commune, Đất Đỏ district, Phước Tuy province.
- On 9 December 1982, the Council of Ministers of the Socialist Republic of Vietnam issued Decision No. 193/HĐBT establishing Trường Sa District as an administrative unit of Đồng Nai Province. On December 28, 1982, The Seventh National Assembly decided to incorporate Trường Sa District into Phú Khánh Province.
- On 1 July 1989, the National Assembly split Phú Khánh Province into Phú Yên province and Khánh Hòa province. Trường Sa district was placed under the direct administration of Khánh Hòa.
- On 16 June 2025, Trường Sa district became Trường Sa special administrative zone based on the foundation of Trường Sa township, Song Tử Tây commune, and Sinh Tồn commune.

== Administration ==
According to Decree No. 65/2007/NĐ-CP of 11 April 2007 issued by the Government of the Socialist Republic of Vietnam, Trường Sa district had three administrative units including one commune-level town (Trường Sa) and two rural communes (Song Tử Tây and Sinh Tồn).

1. Trường Sa Township was established on the basis of Trường Sa Island (Spratly Island) and surrounding islands, reefs and banks.
2. Song Tử Tây Commune was established on the basis of Song Tử Tây island (Southwest Cay) and surrounding islands, reefs and banks.
3. Sinh Tồn Commune was established on the basis of Sinh Tồn Island (Sin Cowe Island) and surrounding islands, reefs and banks.

In reality, Trường Sa district is effectively administering only 21 islets and reefs of the Spratly Islands:

Cluster	Coral islands/cays	Reefs	Map
Song Tử	Southwest Cay (đảo Song Tử Tây)	South Reef (đá Nam)	Trường Sa, Khánh Hòa is located in South China Sea
Thị Tứ	-	-	Trường Sa, Khánh Hòa is located in South China Sea
Loại Ta	-	-	Trường Sa, Khánh Hòa is located in South China Sea
Nam Yết	Namyit Island (đảo Nam Yết), Sand Cay (đảo Sơn Ca)	Discovery Great Reef (đá Lớn), Petley Reef (đá Núi Thị)	Trường Sa, Khánh Hòa is located in South China Sea
Sinh Tồn	Sin Cowe Island (đảo Sinh Tồn), Grierson Reef (đảo Sinh Tồn Đông) (Note: More precisely, đảo Sinh Tồn Đông ("Sin Cowe East Island ") is a cay locating on Grierson Reef.)	Collins Reef/Johnson North Reef (đá Cô Lin), Lansdowne Reef (đá Len Đao)	Trường Sa, Khánh Hòa is located in South China Sea
Trường Sa	Spratly Island (đảo Trường Sa), Pearson Reef (đảo Phan Vinh), (Note: More precisely, đảo Phan Vinh ("Phan Vinh Island") is a part of Pearson Reef.) Central London Reef (đảo Trường Sa Đông) (Note: More precisely, đảo Trường Sa Đông ("Truong Sa Dong Island") is a sandbar locating on Central London Reef.)	East London Reef (đá Đông), Ladd Reef (đá Lát), Cornwallis South Reef (đá Núi Le), West London Reef (đá Tây), Pigeon Reef/Tennent Reef (đá Tiên Nữ), Alison Reef (đá Tốc Tan)	Trường Sa, Khánh Hòa is located in South China Sea
Thám Hiểm	Amboyna Cay (đảo An Bang)	Barque Canada Reef (đá Thuyền Chài)	Trường Sa, Khánh Hòa is located in South China Sea
Bình Nguyên	-	-	Trường Sa, Khánh Hòa is located in South China Sea

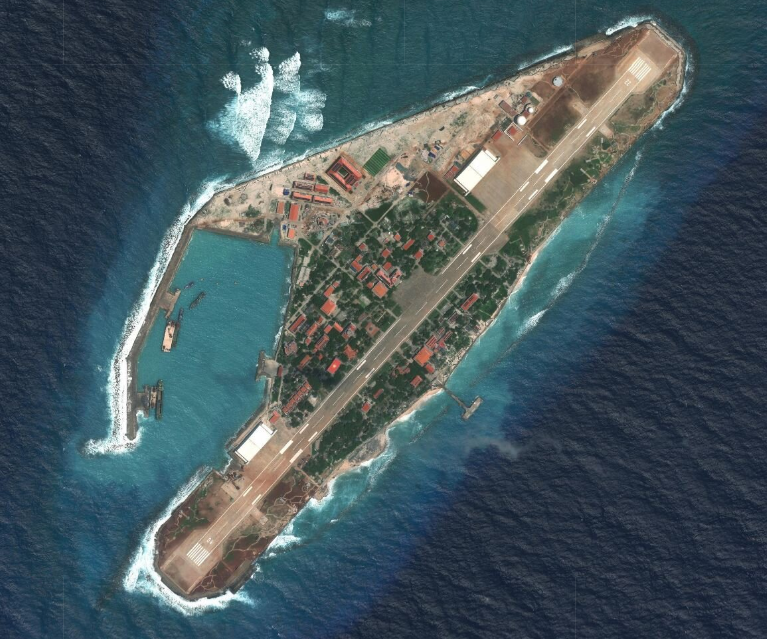
Spratly Island

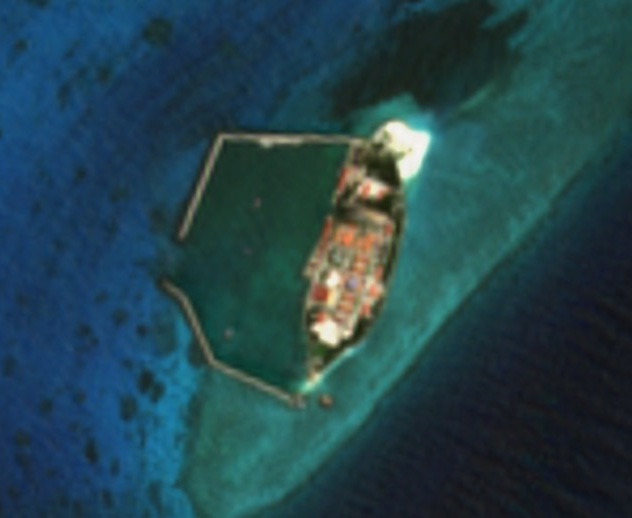
West Reef East Island

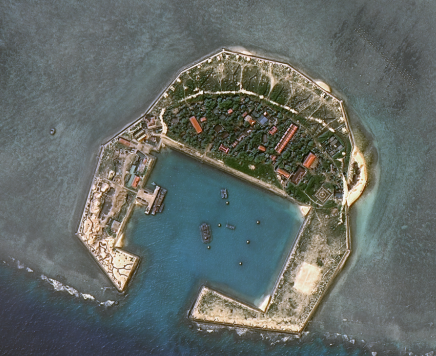
Sin Cowe Island

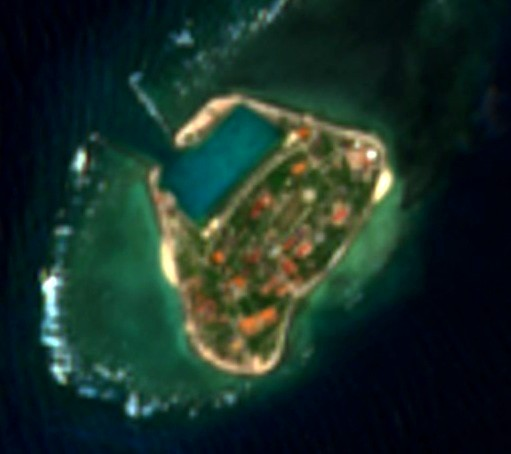
Southwest Cay

== Population ==
According to statistics on April 1, 2009, the population of Truong Sa district was 195 people, of which Truong Sa town area was 82 people.

According to statistics dated April 1, 2019, the population of Truong Sa district was 93 people, of which Truong Sa town area was 30 people.

In the Spratly Islands (the part controlled by Vietnam), there are only 4 islands with permanent inhabitants, which are Spratly Island, West Reef East Island, Sin Cowe Island, and Southwest Cay. On the remaining islands, only naval troops are stationed.

== Transport ==
The Trường Sa special administrative zone is served by Truong Sa Airport located on Spratly Island (Truong Sa Lon Island). It was originally 550 m long, then expanded to 1,200 m as it is today.

In Truong Sa town (former district capital), island communes, island points have piers. The islands inhabited by civilians such as Spratly Island (Truong Sa Lon Island), West Reef East Island (Da Tay A Island), Southwest Cay (Song Tu Tay Island), Sin Cowe Island (Sinh Ton Island) all have large locks for ships to anchor to avoid storms. New locks are also being built on the islands in the accretion phase from the end of 2021, including Namyit Island (Nam Yet Island), Sand Cay (Son Ca Island), and Phan Vinh Island.

== Education ==
Trường Sa special administrative zone has 4 primary schools on the islands: Spratly Island, Southwest Cay, Sin Cowe Island and West Reef East Island accepting students from kindergarten to grade 5. Students who want to study at higher levels must enter the school on mainland for further study.

== Telecommunication ==
Viettel Group has installed a number of broadcasting stations in Trường Sa. The coverage of the stations is 20 km from the islands/atolls and also allows wireless Internet access with 2.75G EDGE, 3G, 4G LTE technology.

== See also ==
- Kalayaan, Palawan, Philippines
- Nansha, Sansha, Hainan, China
- Johnson South Reef Skirmish
