= Spratly Island =

Island in the South China Sea

Disputed island
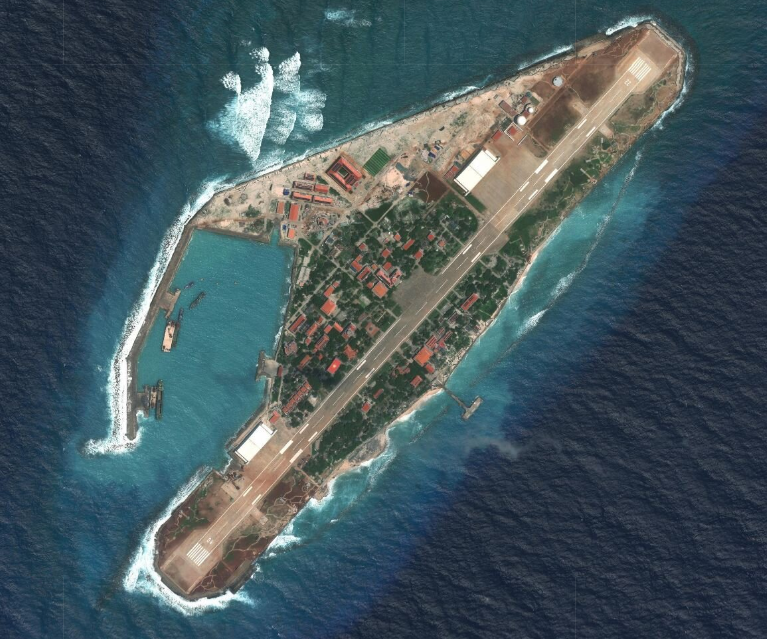
- Spratly Island

- Location within Spratly Islands
- Other names: Storm Island; Big Trường Sa (Vietnamese English); Đảo Trường Sa [Lớn] (Vietnamese) 南威島/南威岛 Nánwēi Dǎo (Mandarin Chinese); Lagos Island (Philippine English); Pulo ng Lagos (Filipino)

Geography
- Location: South China Sea
- Coordinates: 8°38′41″N 111°55′12″E
- Archipelago: Spratly Islands
- Area: 36.5 ha (90 acres)

Administration
- Vietnam
- District: Trường Sa District, Khánh Hòa
- Special zone: Trường Sa special administrative zone

Claimed by
- China
- Taiwan
- Vietnam

Demographics
- Population: 30

Spratly Island (Vietnamese: Đảo Trường Sa or Đảo Trường Sa Lớn, lit. 'the Big Spratly (Trường Sa) Island'; simplified Chinese: 南威岛; traditional Chinese: 南威島; pinyin: Nánwēi Dǎo; Filipino: Pulo ng Lagos, lit. 'Lagos Island'), also known as Storm Island, is the fourth largest of the naturally occurring Spratly Islands in the South China Sea with a natural area of 15 hectares (37 acres), and was the largest of the Vietnamese-administered Spratly islands.

In 2016 the Vietnamese embarked on a land reclamation program at ten locations in the Spratly Islands. At Spratly Island 37 acres have been reclaimed, which has allowed for the addition of a harbour and the doubling of the length of the island's runway to a length of about 4,000 feet (1,200 m). The total area of the island by 2025 is 36.5 hectares.

Flag of the Vietnamese military forces stationing in the Spratly Island.

It is also claimed by China (PRC) and Taiwan (ROC).

== Location ==
Spratly island lies west of the SW of Dangerous Ground in the western half of the Spratly Islands. It is neighboured by Ladd Reef to the west, the London Reefs to the east, and others.

== History in the 20th century ==
In April 1930, France sent the dispatch boat (aviso), la Malicieuse, to the archipelago and raised the flag of France on a high mound on Spratly Island, also known as île de la Tempête. According to an official announcement by the French Ministry of Foreign Affairs, France occupied Spratly Island on April 13, 1930.

On 21 December 1933, the Governor of Cochinchina, Jean-Félix Krautheimer, signed Decree No. 4702-CP merging Spratly Island, Amboyna Cay, Itu Aba Island, Northeast Cay, Southwest Cay, Loaita Island, Thitu Island and other dependent islands with Ba Ria province (present-day Vietnam's Bà Rịa–Vũng Tàu province).

In April 1939 Japan occupied the island provoking protests from the French. The Japanese also laid claim to 1000 square miles of the South China sea between 7 and 12 degrees north and 111 to 112 degrees east. During the occupation of the island by the Imperial Japanese Navy at the time of the Pacific War, the island was known by the Japanese as Nishitori jima (西鳥島; lit. "Western bird island").

After World War II, the Republic of China Navy sent a fleet of vessels to the South China Sea to take over the occupation of islands from Japan. In 1946, the Republic of China government announced the sovereignty of this island, set a milestone, and named it "Nanwei Island". (Nanwei is the name of the Chairman of Guangdong Province in China in 1946 – Chinese: 南威島). In December 1960, the United States Military Assistance Advisory Group requested permission from Taiwan's Republic of China Ministry of National Defense to carry out surveys at this island, which was approved.

During the early 1960s, the Republic of Vietnam Navy stopped off at the island several times. In 1963, three ships (HQ-404 Huong Giang, HQ-01 Chi Lang and HQ-09 Ki Hoa) visited and systematically rebuilt steles on a number of islands in the archipelago. On May 19, 1963, they built one on Spratly Island. However, the war on the mainland led to the absence of Vietnamese troops on the island until 1974 when South Vietnam set up a permanent garrison there after the Crescent Group of the Paracel Islands was lost to China. On April 29, 1975, the Vietnam People's Army evicted South Vietnam's troops and occupied the island.

== Administration ==
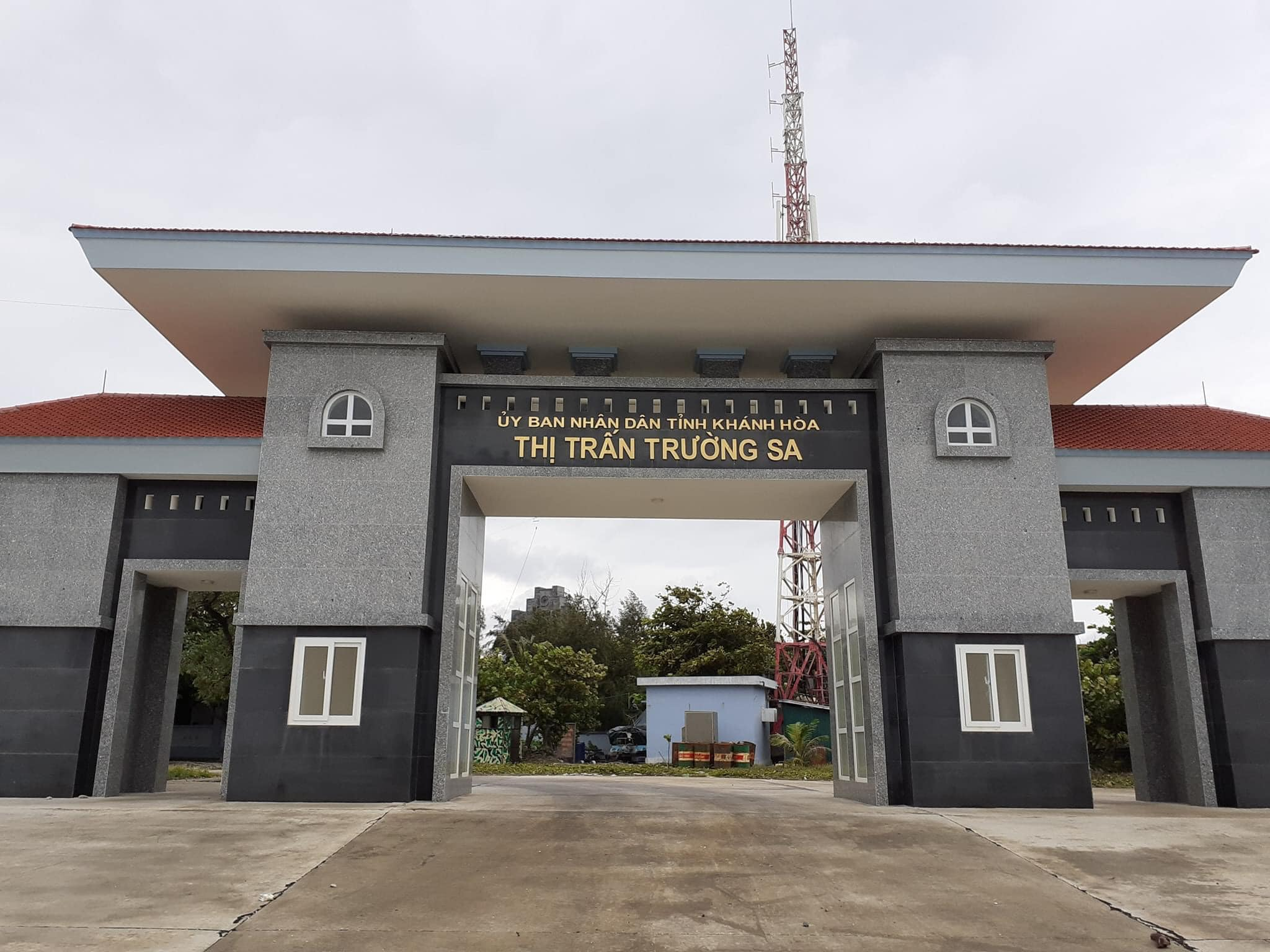
Welcome gate to Truong Sa township.

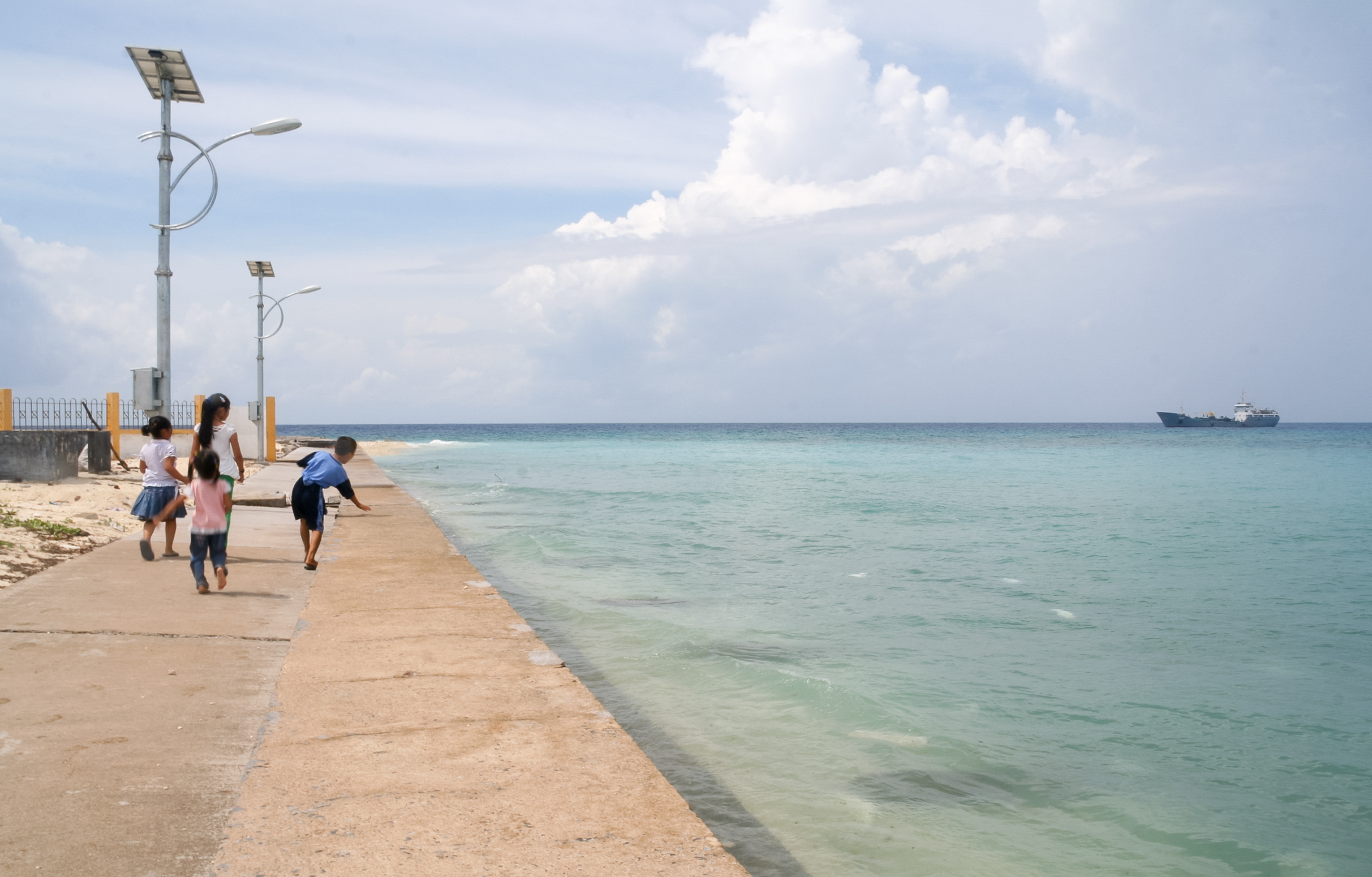
Children playing on Spratly Island's beach

Under the South Vietnamese regime, Spratly Island was placed under the administration of Khánh Hòa province. In 2007, the Vietnamese government upgraded the island's status to a commune-level town which is in charge of administering all nearby Vietnamese-controlled features such as Amboyna Cay and Barque Canada Reef. On the island lies Trường Sa District's administrative center.

== Geography ==
Spratly Island is shaped like an isosceles triangle. According to a document published by the Political Department of Vietnam's Navy Command, the island is 630 metres (2,070 ft) in length, up to 300 metres (980 ft) in width and has an area of 0.15 square kilometres (37 acres) while several foreign documents often use a slightly smaller number of 0.13 square kilometres (32 acres). It is 3.4 to 5 metres above sea level during low tide. The island has a variety of vegetation with a source of brackish water which can be utilized for bathing, washing and watering plants. The fringing reefs that lie at all three corners are up to 200 metres (660 ft) wide and uncovered at low tide.

=== Climate ===
Spratly Island has a tropical monsoon climate (Köppen climate classification Am). With the typical meteorological characteristics of an archipelago, the Spratly Islands have a cool summer and a warm winter. The dry season, spanning from February to May, is characterized by a higher temperature from 4:30 AM to 19:00 PM. May–January is the time of the rainy season, when temperatures are lower during daytime, but thunderstorms are more likely to occur.

Climate data for Spratly Islands
Month	Jan	Feb	Mar	Apr	May	Jun	Jul	Aug	Sep	Oct	Nov	Dec	Year
Record high °C (°F)	31.7 (89.1)	31.3 (88.3)	32.7 (90.9)	34.5 (94.1)	34.1 (93.4)	34.5 (94.1)	32.9 (91.2)	34.0 (93.2)	33.4 (92.1)	33.0 (91.4)	32.2 (90.0)	31.0 (87.8)	34.5 (94.1)
Mean daily maximum °C (°F)	27.6 (81.7)	28.4 (83.1)	29.9 (85.8)	31.2 (88.2)	31.6 (88.9)	30.5 (86.9)	30.0 (86.0)	29.9 (85.8)	29.9 (85.8)	29.9 (85.8)	29.2 (84.6)	28.0 (82.4)	29.7 (85.5)
Daily mean °C (°F)	26.4 (79.5)	26.7 (80.1)	27.8 (82.0)	28.9 (84.0)	29.3 (84.7)	28.7 (83.7)	28.2 (82.8)	28.1 (82.6)	28.1 (82.6)	28.0 (82.4)	27.6 (81.7)	26.7 (80.1)	27.9 (82.2)
Mean daily minimum °C (°F)	25.2 (77.4)	25.5 (77.9)	26.3 (79.3)	27.2 (81.0)	27.5 (81.5)	26.5 (79.7)	26.1 (79.0)	26.1 (79.0)	26.0 (78.8)	26.0 (78.8)	25.7 (78.3)	25.2 (77.4)	26.1 (79.0)
Record low °C (°F)	22.1 (71.8)	21.5 (70.7)	21.4 (70.5)	23.1 (73.6)	21.2 (70.2)	22.9 (73.2)	21.9 (71.4)	22.2 (72.0)	21.9 (71.4)	22.6 (72.7)	22.0 (71.6)	21.7 (71.1)	21.2 (70.2)
Average precipitation mm (inches)	117 (4.6)	68 (2.7)	43 (1.7)	51 (2.0)	109 (4.3)	238 (9.4)	237 (9.3)	236 (9.3)	247 (9.7)	285 (11.2)	409 (16.1)	373 (14.7)	2,412 (95.0)
Average precipitation days	15.9	9.9	6.3	7.3	12.5	17.3	18.5	19.4	17.7	20.5	23.2	22.7	191.1
Average relative humidity (%)	85.7	84.4	81.4	78.5	78.6	81.1	82.0	83.0	82.7	82.0	84.5	86.5	82.5
Source: Vietnam Institute for Building Science and Technology

== Ecology ==
The island's plants are mostly Barringtonia asiatica, Ipomoea pes-caprae, Heliotropium foertherianum, and some kinds of bush and grass which grow poorly due to the harsh climate. Spratly Island is home to some birds and has guano deposits. Islanders try to cultivate banana, papaya, chili pepper and a variety of vegetables and herbs. There are also hundreds of dogs and much poultry such as chickens, ducks and geese.

== Facilities ==
=== Airstrip ===
Trường Sa Airport Sân bay Trường Sa
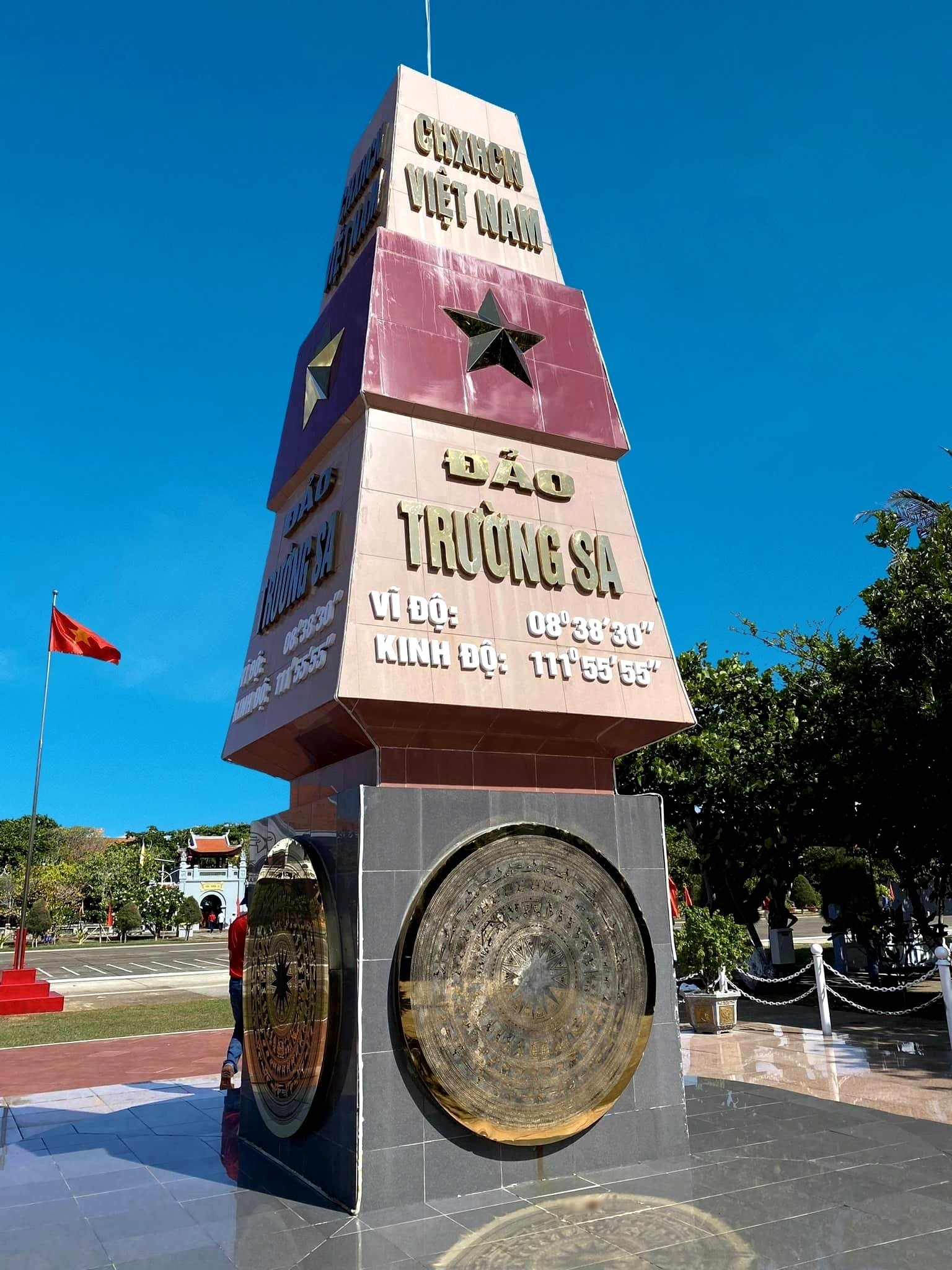
- The sovereignty marker next to the airstrip

- IATA: none; ICAO: none

Summary
- Airport type: Military
- Owner: Vietnam Ministry of National Defence
- Operator: Vietnam
- Location: Spratly Island

Map

Runways
Direction	Length		Surface
Direction	m	ft	Surface
04/22	1,200	3,937	Concrete

The original runway was built in 1976–77. From 2004, the configurations included a 600 metres (2,000 ft) landing strip that could accommodate small fixed-wing propeller aircraft (PZL M28 Skytruck, de Havilland Canada DHC-6 Twin Otter). Aircraft were parked on a small tarmac area next to the runway which runs the entire length of the island, with both ends ending on beachfront. Homes surround the two sides of the runway and a small two-story building with a control tower on the roof is located by the apron.

Since 2016, photos and reports were published showing extensive land-reclamation and construction work at Spratly Island, with new harbours and extension of the runway to at least 1,200 metres (3,900 ft). The island also has a helicopter pad.

=== Other facilities ===
Built in 1977, the meteorological station on Spratly Island has station index number 48920 as assigned by the World Meteorological Organization.

Vietnam Military Telecommunications Corp., known commonly as Viettel, established mobile coverage in the Spratlys Island in 2007 to assert sovereignty and allow soldiers to speak with their families back home.

Energy is provided by solar panels and wind turbines. Additional facilities included a small jetty with two piers, a clinic, a cultural house, a radio tower and a Buddhist pagoda. A primary school has been in operation since April 2013. There is a 5.5 m-high obelisk at the southern tip.

== See also ==
- Spratly Islands dispute
- Richard Spratly
- Dongsha Island Airport (Pratas Island)
- Yongxing Island Airport (Woody Island in the Paracel Islands)
- List of airports in the Spratly Islands
- List of maritime features in the Spratly Islands
- Taiping Island Airport
- Layang-Layang Airport
