= Alison Reef =

Island

Disputed atoll
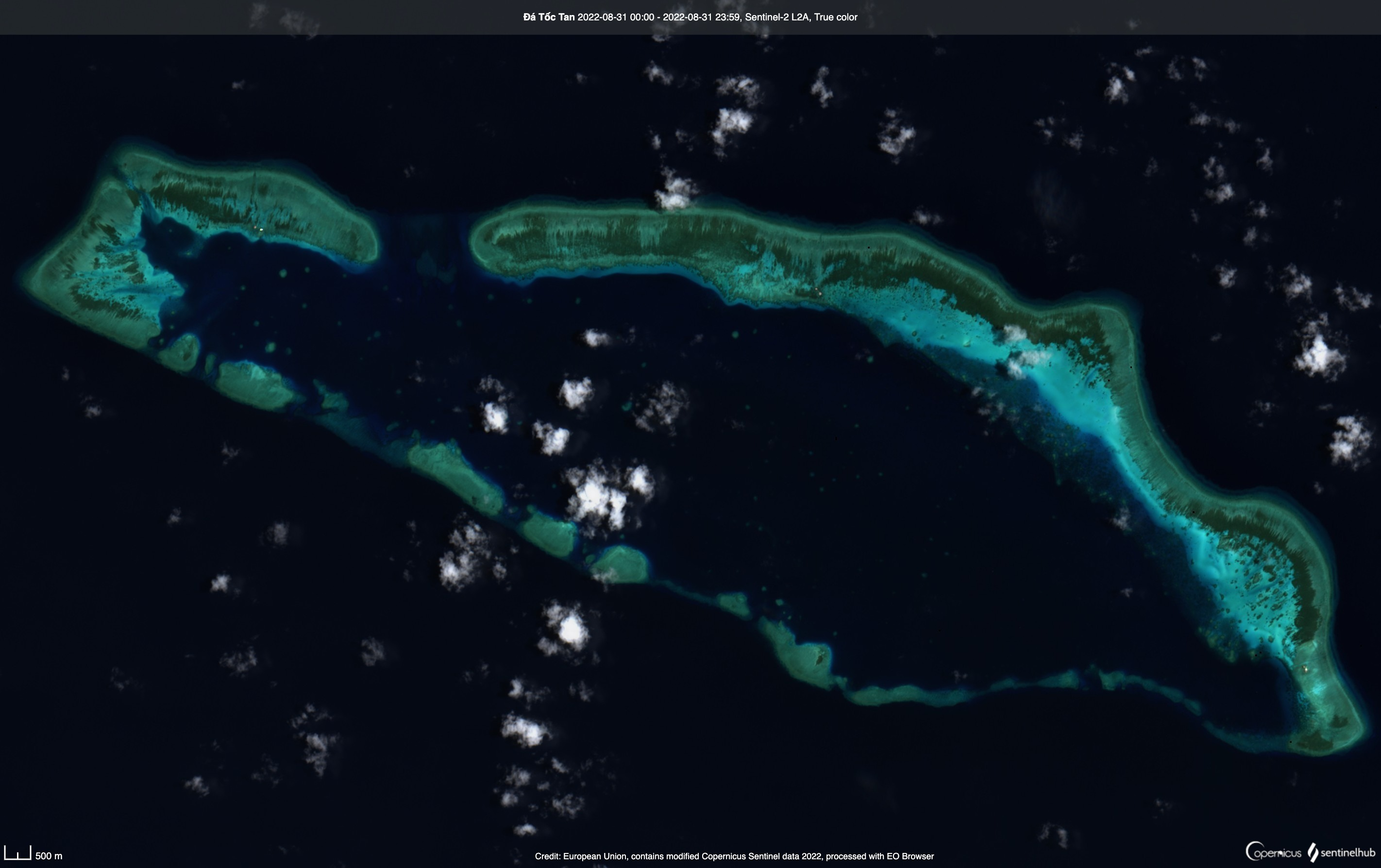
- Alison Reef

- Location within Spratly Islands
- Other names: Đá Tốc Tan (Vietnamese); De Jesus Reef(Philippine English); Bahura ng De Jesus (Filipino) 六门礁 Liùmén jiāo (Chinese)

Geography
- Location: South China Sea
- Coordinates: 8°48′42″N 113°59′0″E
- Archipelago: Spratly Islands

Administration
- Vietnam
- District: Trường Sa District
- Township: Trường Sa Township

Claimed by
- China
- Philippines
- Taiwan

Alison Reef (Filipino: Bahura ng De Jesus; Tốc Tan Reef (Vietnamese: Đá Tốc Tan); Mandarin Chinese: 六门礁; pinyin: Liùmén jiāo) is a reef on the Spratly Islands in the South China Sea. The reef has been occupied by Vietnam since 1988. It is also claimed by China (PRC), the Philippines, Vietnam, and Taiwan (ROC).

== See also ==
- Spratly Islands dispute
