= Barque Canada Reef =

Island

Disputed reef
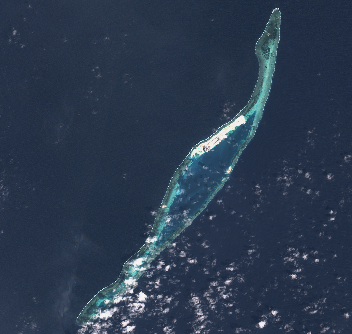
- Barque Canada Reef

- Location within Spratly Islands
- Other names: Lizzie Weber Reef; Bãi Thuyền Chài (Vietnamese); Terumbu Perahu (Malay); Mascardo Reef (Philippine English); Bahura ng Mascardo (Filipino) 柏礁 Bǎi jiāo (Chinese)

Geography
- Location: South China Sea
- Coordinates: 8°10′0″N 113°18′0″E
- Archipelago: Spratly Islands
- Total islands: 5
- Major islands: Thuyen Chai D Island (largest)
- Area: Thuyen Chai D Island: 230 ha Thuyền Chai E Island: 6 ha Thuyen Chai A Island: 2.5 ha Thuyen Chai C Island: 1 ha Thuyen Chai B Islet: insignificant area

Administration
- Vietnam
- District: Trường Sa District
- Township: Trường Sa Township

Claimed by
- China
- Malaysia
- Philippines
- Taiwan

Barque Canada Reef (Filipino: Bahura ng Mascardo); Malay: Terumbu Perahu; Thuyền Chài Reef (Vietnamese: Bãi Thuyền Chài); Mandarin Chinese: 柏礁; pinyin: Bǎi jiāo, is a reef on the Spratly Islands in the South China Sea. The reef has been occupied by Vietnam since 1988. It is also claimed by China (PRC), Malaysia, the Philippines, Vietnam, and Taiwan (ROC).

Barque Canada Reef is a shallow, long (nearly 30 km) and narrow (less than 4 km at its widest point) coral atoll in the Dangerous Ground zone. The nearest island is Amboyna Cay, just over 20 nautical miles to the south-west.

The government of Vietnam began a major project to develop Barque Canada Reef in 2022. This activity involved dredging and reclaiming land, as well as erecting new structures such as harbors and sea walls. Just in 2024, its territory artificially increased from 238 acres (96.31 hectares) to 412 acres (166.73 hectares). an area equivalent to 75% of Monaco.

== Characteristic ==
=== Geography ===
This entity is oriented along a northeast-southwest axis, measuring approximately 15.8 nautical miles (29.3 km) in length and up to 1.9 nautical miles (3.5 km) in width. At the southwestern corner of the reef, there is a prominent rock rising above the sea surface, known as Lizzie Webber Reef (Da Ha Tan). Along the northeastern third of the reef’s length extending southwest, several individual rocks emerge above the water.

The lagoon within the coral ring is about 13 km long and has an average width of 2 km. Within this lagoon, there are three small sandbanks that rise approximately 0.5 meters above the water during low tide but are submerged by about 1 meter during high tide. The area of the coral foundation of this reef is around 49.5 km², while the lagoon itself covers approximately 16.9 km².

=== Islands & islets ===
Vietnam has constructed solid hexagonal buildings at three locations on Barque Canada Reef and upgraded new military structures. At each location, there are two buildings connected by a bridge, one of which serves fishermen. These locations are named Thuyen Chai Islands/Islets (A, B, C), with geographic coordinates as follows (coordinates as recorded on the sovereignty marker are in parentheses):

- Thuyen Chai A Island: 8°9′13″N 113°16′59″E (8°10′00″N 113°18′00″E), in the center of Barque Canada Reef.
- Thuyen Chai B Islet: 8°4′34″N 113°13′37″E, on the south side of Barque Canada Reef.
- Thuyen Chai C Island: 8°16′11″N 113°21′18″E, on the north side of Barque Canada Reef.

The multi-functional cultural houses were inaugurated on Thuyen Chai A Island in 2021 and on Thuyen Chai B Islet in 2022.

Since November 2021, Vietnam has begun land reclamation and dredging of the lagoon at Barque Canada Reef. Vietnam has created two new artificial islands:

- Thuyen Chai D Island: 8°11′59.9″N 113°19′16.5″E, located in the middle of the western shore of the atoll. As of early 2025, the island covers an area of approximately 2.3 km² and has a length of 4,318 meters. Vietnam is completing a major 3,200 metres (10,500 ft) runway on the entity, similar to the ones built by China on Subi Reef, Fiery Cross Reef, and Mischief Reef.

Thuyền Chài D (Vietnam)
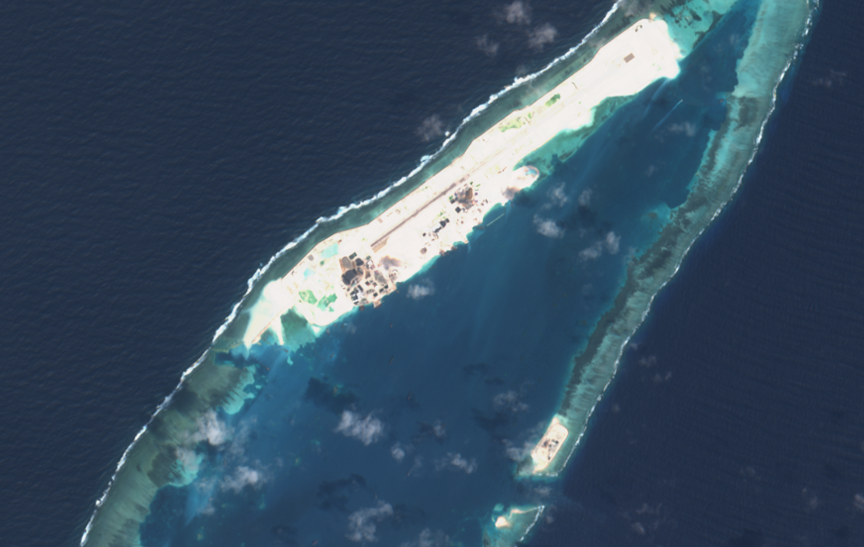
- Satellite image of Thuyen Chai D Island (the larger island, on the left) and Thuyen Chai E Island (the smaller island, on the right) taken in January 2025.
- IATA: none; ICAO: none

Summary
- Airport type: Military
- Owner/Operator: Vietnam Ministry of National Defence
- Interactive map of Thuyền Chài D

Runways
Direction	Length		Surface
Direction	ft	m	Surface
05/23	10,500	3,200	Concrete

- Thuyen Chai E Island: 8°10′37.4″N 113°19′40.1″E, located in the middle of the eastern shore of the atoll. This is an artificial island with an area of approximately 6.5 hectares and a length of 375 meters.

Since August 2024, Vietnam has begun land reclamation to transform Thuyen Chai C Islet, located in the northern part of the reef, into Thuyen Chai C Island. Since November 2024, Vietnam has also started land reclamation on Thuyen Chai A Islet, situated in the middle of the reef, to turn it into Thuyen Chai A Island.

== History ==
On 24 December 1864, the British barque (a three-masted sailing ship), the Canada, was wrecked on a previously unmarked reef. The crew noted the latitude and longitude of the feature and it was subsequently named after the lost ship.

In April 1978, the Vietnamese Navy's HQ-501 vessel transported a detachment of Regiment 146 to occupy Barque Canada Reef. Due to material shortages, the detachment withdrew back to the mainland in May 1978.

Amid efforts by several countries to assert control over Barque Canada Reef, on the morning of March 5, 1987, Vietnam covertly deployed a force from Naval Brigade 146 to seize and secure the reef, making it the first submerged reef in the Spratly Islands where Vietnam established a military presence.

In the second quarter of 1987, Navy Engineer Regiment 83 completed the construction of several structures on the reef. During this period, Malaysia frequently conducted reconnaissance flights to monitor Vietnam's activities.

== See also ==
- Spratly Islands dispute
