= Central London Reef =

Island

Disputed reef
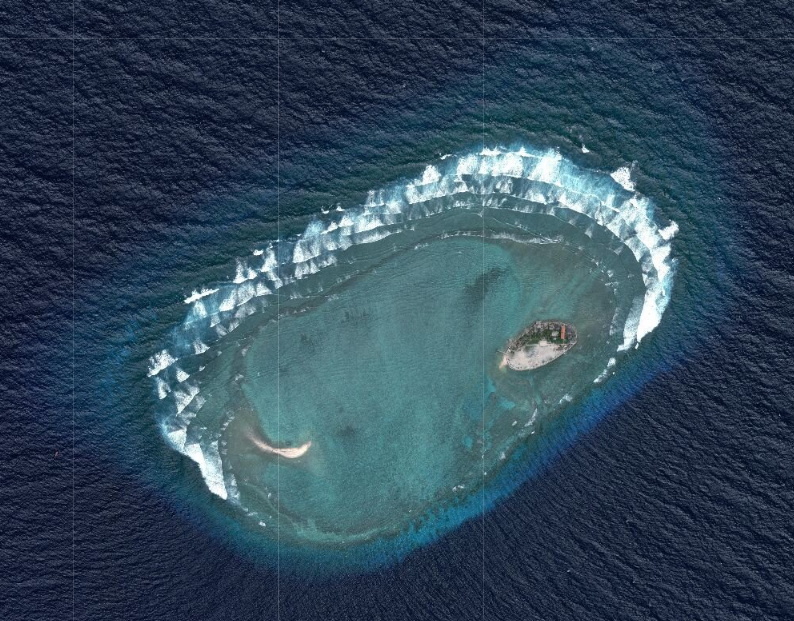
- Central London Reef

- Location within Spratly Islands
- Other names: Đảo Trường Sa Đông (Vietnamese); Central Quezon Reef (Philippine English); Bahura ng Gitnang Quezon (Filipino) 中礁 Zhōng jiāo(Chinese)

Geography
- Location: South China Sea
- Coordinates: 8°55′52″N 112°21′11″E
- Archipelago: Spratly Islands

Administration
- Vietnam
- District: Trường Sa District
- Township: Trường Sa Township

Claimed by
- Vietnam
- Philippines
- Taiwan

Central London Reef (Filipino: Bahura ng Gitnang Quezon); Trường Sa Đông Island (Vietnamese: Đảo Trường Sa Đông); Mandarin Chinese: 中礁; pinyin: Zhōng jiāo, is a reef on the central part of the London Reefs of the Spratly Islands in the South China Sea. The reef has been occupied by Vietnam since 1978. It is also claimed by the Philippines, Vietnam, and Taiwan (ROC).

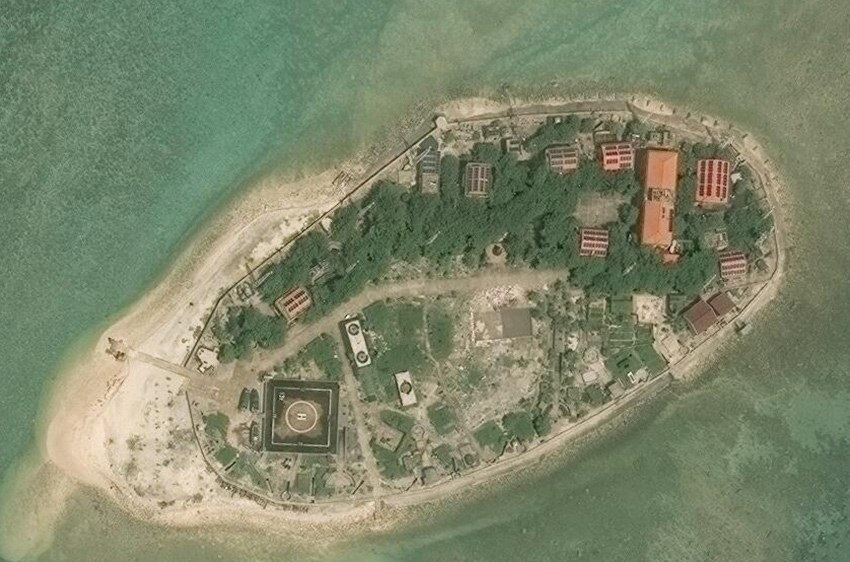
Central London Reef Cay

== See also ==
- Spratly Islands dispute
