= West London Reef =

Island

Disputed atoll
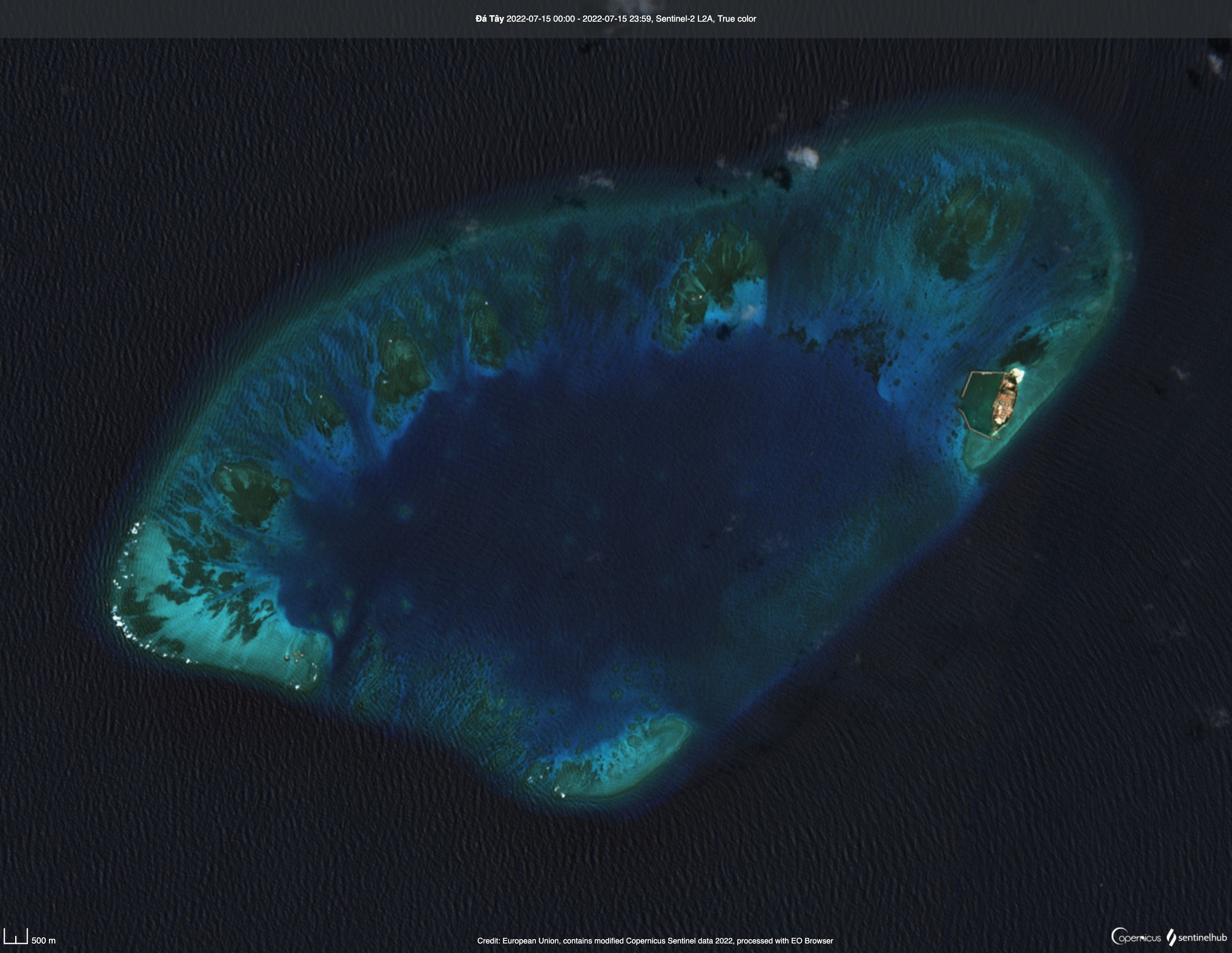
- West London Reef

- Location within Spratly Islands
- Other names: Đá Tây (Vietnamese); West Quezon Reef(Philippine English); Bahura ng Kanlurang Quezon (Filipino) 西礁 Xī jiāo (Chinese)

Geography
- Location: South China Sea
- Coordinates: 8°51′32″N 112°13′30″E
- Archipelago: Spratly Islands
- Total islands: 3
- Major islands: West Reef East Island
- Area: 11 ha (27 acres)

Administration
- Vietnam
- District: Trường Sa District
- Township: Trường Sa Township

Claimed by
- China
- Philippines
- Taiwan
- Vietnam

West London Reef (Filipino: Bahura ng Kanlurang Quezon); West Reef (Vietnamese: Đá Tây); Mandarin Chinese: 西礁; pinyin: Xī jiāo, is an atoll on the western part of the London Reefs of the Spratly Islands in the South China Sea. The Atoll has been occupied by Vietnam since 1987. It is also claimed by China (PRC), the Philippines, and Taiwan (ROC).

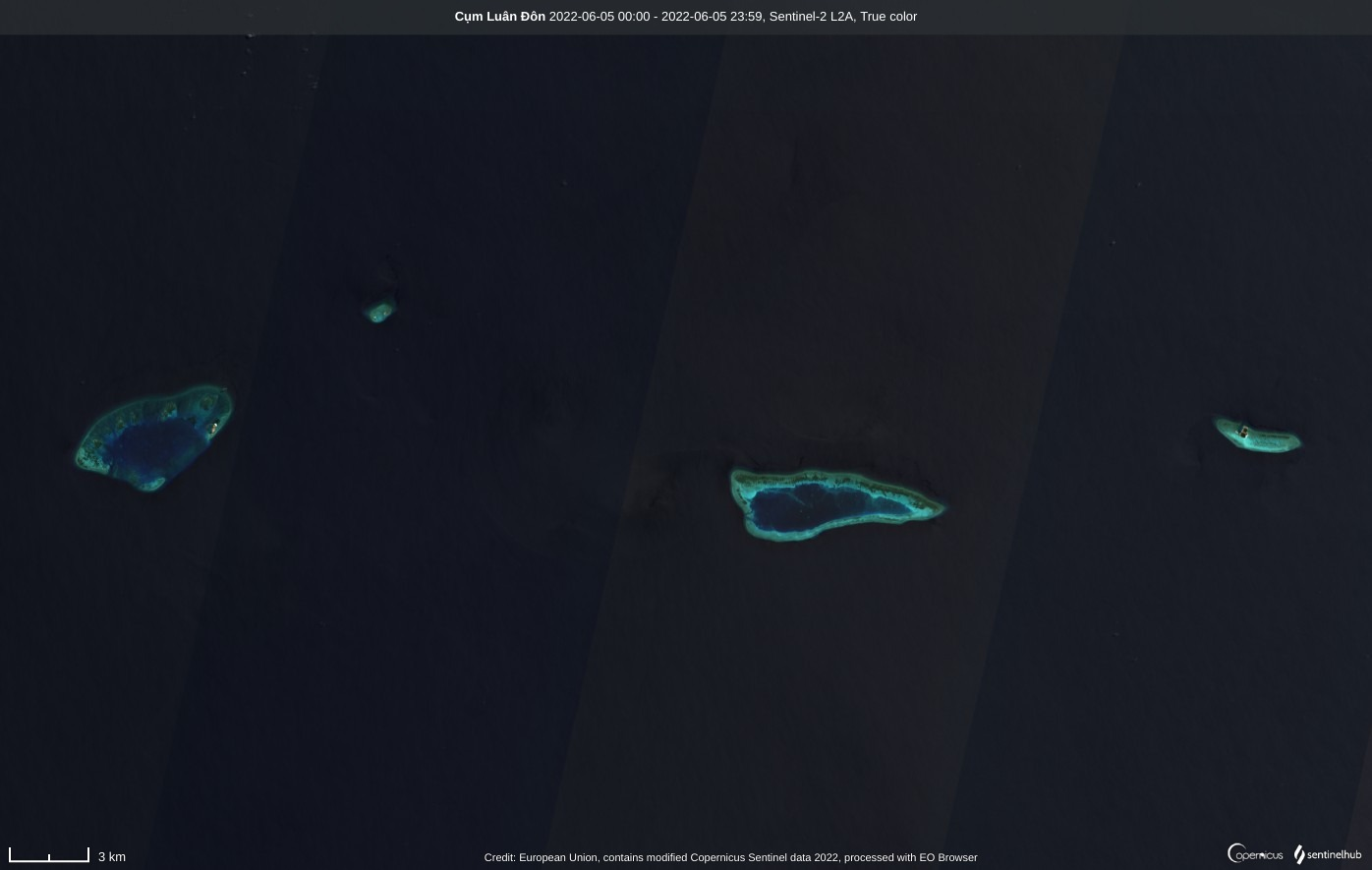
West London Reef in London Reefs.

== Characteristic ==
West Reef East Island
Disputed island
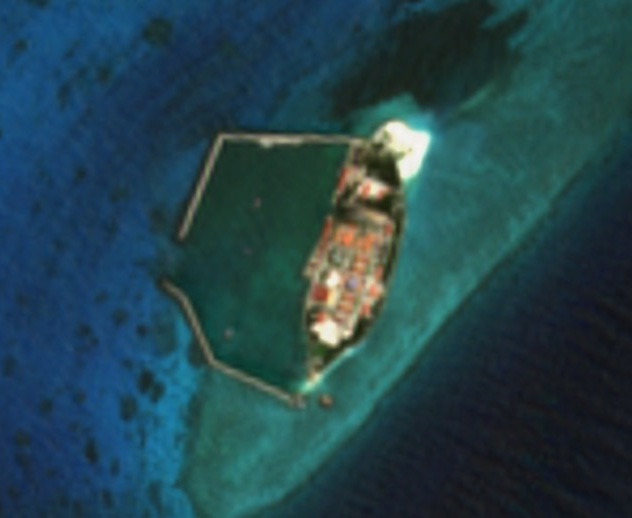
- Satellite image of West Reef East Island
- Interactive map of West Reef East Island
- Other names: Vietnamese: Da Tay A Island (Đảo Đá Tây A); Chinese: Xijiao Dong Island (西礁东岛; pinyin: Xījiāo Dōngdǎo)

Geography
- Location: South China Sea
- Coordinates: 8°52′00″N 112°15′25″E
- Type: Coral island
- Archipelago: Spratly Islands
- Area: 0.11 km^{2} (0.042 sq mi)
- Length: 0.7 km (0.43 mi)
- Coastline: 1.7 km (1.06 mi)

Administration
- Vietnam
- District: Trường Sa District
- Township: Trường Sa Township

Claimed by
- China
- Philippines
- Taiwan
- Vietnam

West London reef (Da Tay reef) is shaped like a filling along the northeast-southwest axis, about 9 kilometres (5.6 mi) long and 5.5 kilometres (3.4 mi) wide. The creeks divide the reef's rim into four distinct sections. A sandbar emerges with a maximum height of 0.7 m on the eastern reef.

The Vietnamese Navy has stationed at 3 points on Da Tay, named Da Tay Islands (A, B, C), with geographical coordinates (in brackets are the coordinates recorded on the sovereignty stele):

- Da Tay A Island: 8°52′00″N 112°15′25″E (8°52′00″N 112°15′25″E), [Chinese: 西礁东岛; pinyin: Xījiāo Dōngdǎo], as known as West Reef East Island, is an island located on the east side of West London Reef, with a significant floating land area lying on the opposite side of the island. northwest of West stony atoll. According to the Center for Strategic and International Studies (CSIS, USA), Vietnam has rehabilitated 28.5 hectares (70 acres) including reclaimed land and dredged coral foundation for ship locks. According to satellite images LandLook (USGS, USA), the current floating land area of this island is about 11 hectares (27 acres).
- Da Tay B Islets: 8°50′43″N 112°11′46″E (8°54′02″N 113°13′20″E), [Chinese: 西礁西岛; pinyin: Xījiāo Xīdǎo], as known as West Reef West Island, located to the southwest of the coral reef, including 2 longhouses and a multi-purpose cultural house (completed in January 2013) connected by a concrete bridge, right next to Da Tay Lighthouse.
- Da Tay C Islets: 8°52′32″N 112°13′50″E (8°52′00″N 112°21′00″E), [Chinese: 龙鼻中礁; pinyin: Lóngbí Zhōngjiāo], north of the atoll, consisting of a longhouse with a multi-cultural house.

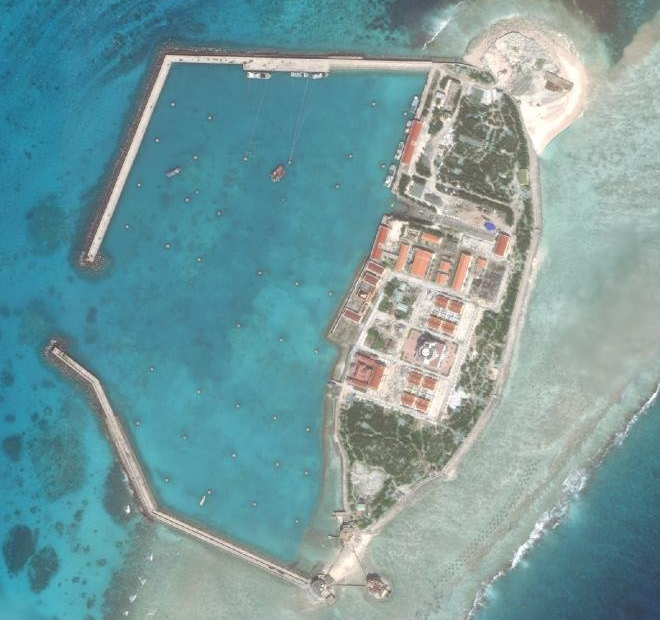
Da Tay A Island

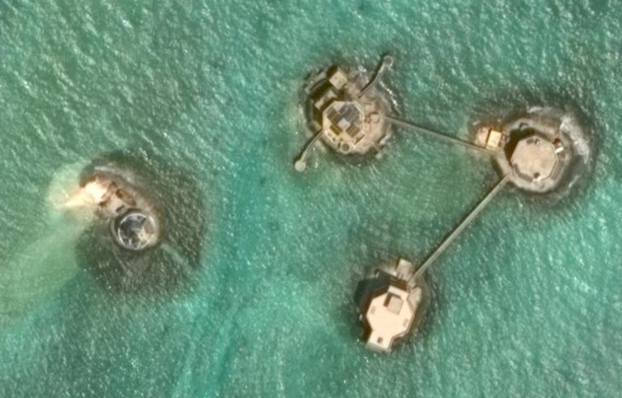
Da Tay B Islets

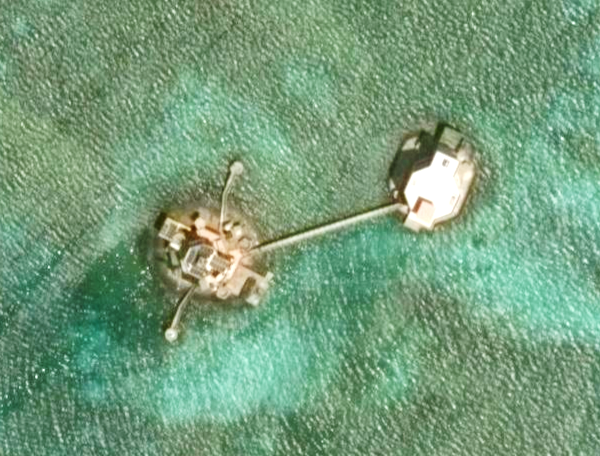
Da Tay C Islets

== Infrastructure ==
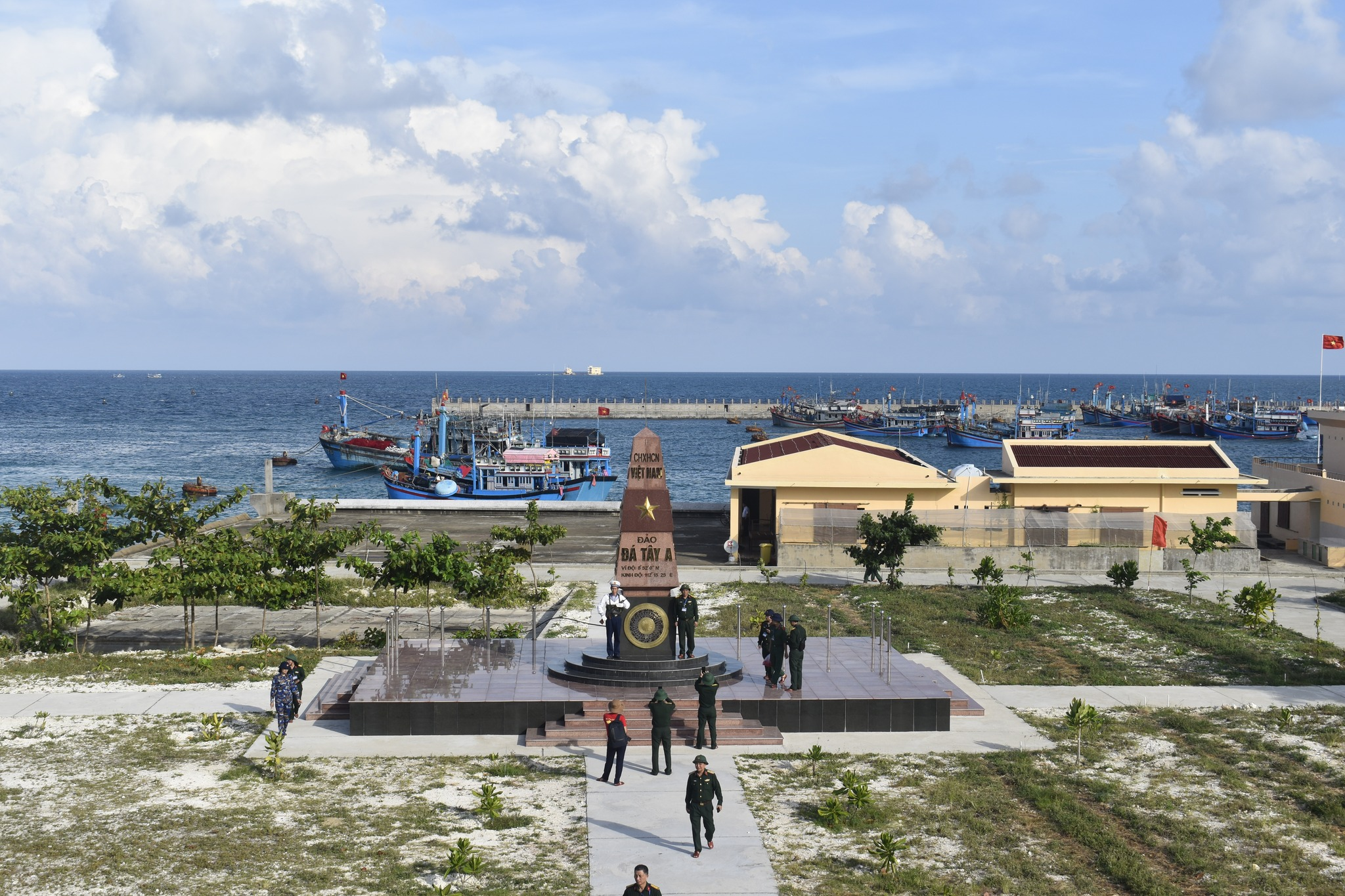
The sovereignty marker of West Reef East Island (Da Tay A Island) taken from above. Da Tay C Islets can be seen on the horizon.

In addition to the naval fortifications, there is also a lighthouse built in 1994 located near Da Tay B Islets (geographic coordinates recorded at the light station are 8°50′41″N 112°11′42″E).

West Reef East Island (Da Tay A Island) is a new sunken island that has been renovated and built into a floating island, the current floating part is entirely coral carcasses taken from the excavation to make a lock, characterized by saline coral sand. Green vegetables on the island are grown in greenhouses. There is an underground tank right under the membrane house floor to collect all rainwater at the roofs and concrete roads to store for irrigation of vegetables and livestock. Trees on the island are grown mainly putat, casuarina.

West Reef East Island has a lock of about 16.5 hectares (41 acres) that can accommodate about 200 fishing boats to avoid storms safely. Besides, there is also a fishery logistics service area, a pilot aquaculture complex (belonging to the East Sea Fishery Service One Member Limited Liability Company, Ministry of Agriculture and Rural Development). and a supermarket that provides a full range of essential items for fishermen from food, food to necessities. In addition, the island also has 2 storm shelters with a capacity of 2,000 people.

On West Reef East Island, there is "House of Great Unity of Vietnamese Ethnic Groups" built in 2019. In June 2022, Da Tay A Pagoda was inaugurated on the island by the Vietnam Buddhist Sangha.

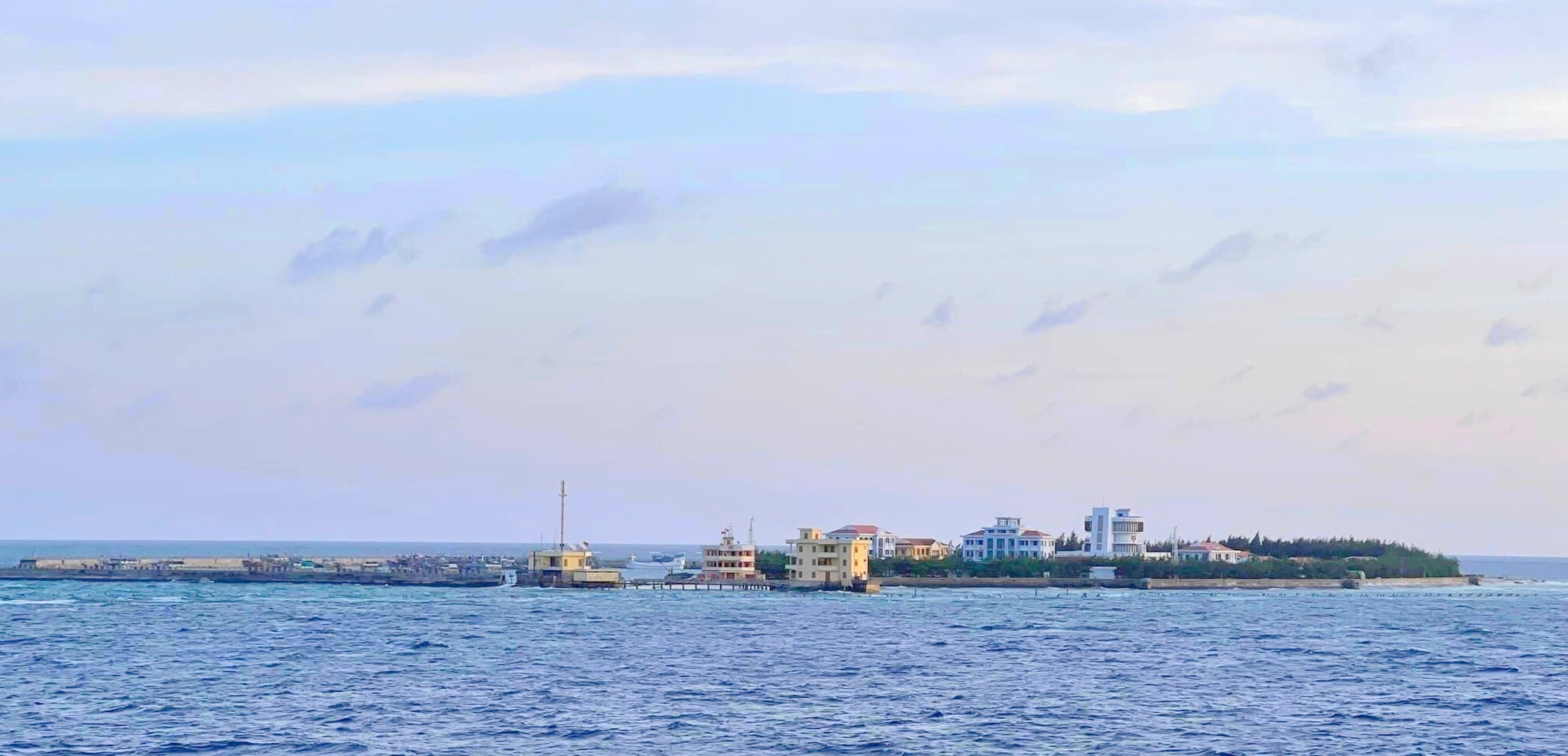
West Reef East (Da Tay A) Island, viewed from the southeast

== History ==
Since the end of 1987, the dispution in the Spratly Islands area became tense, China sent many warships to operate in the archipelago area, intending to occupy some coral reefs. The Vietnamese Navy opened the CQ-88 campaign, organized forces and vehicles to keep a number of islands and reefs in the Spratlys.

On December 2, 1987, the HQ-604 ship of the 125th Brigade brought the marines and engineers along with materials to build a class-3 house on West London Reef (Da Tay B Islets).

By the end of November 1987, the living quarters and watch houses were completed. The unit holding West London Reef immediately organized guarding and protecting the island.

== See also ==
- Spratly Islands dispute
