= Cornwallis South Reef =

Coral atoll reef in the South China Sea

Disputed atoll
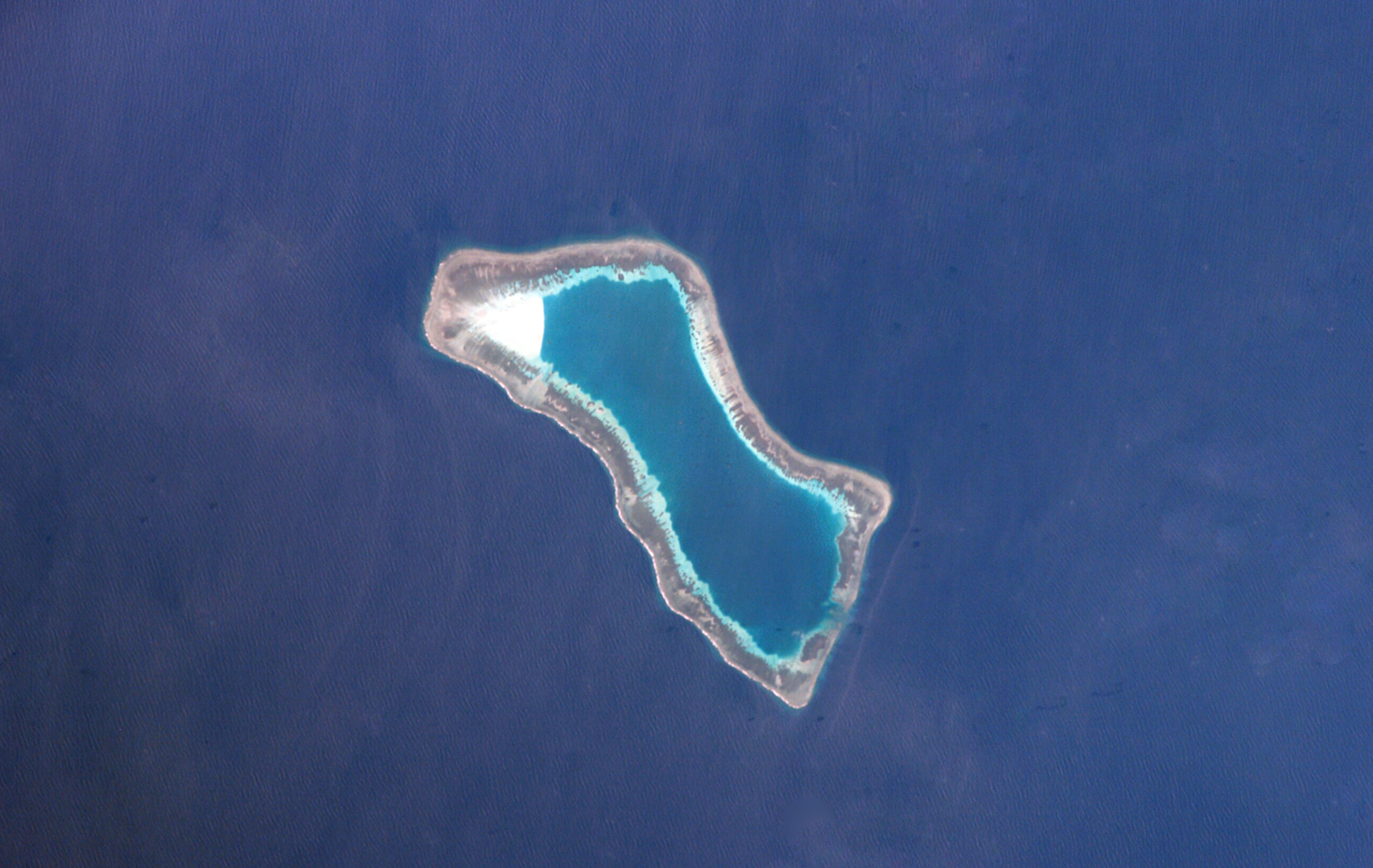
- Satellite image

- Location within Spratly Islands
- Other names: Đá Núi Le (Vietnamese); Nanhua Reef (南华礁) (Chinese); Osmeña Reef (Philippine English); Bahura ng Osmeña (Filipino)

Geography
- Location: South China Sea
- Coordinates: 8.7191081°N 114.1819513°E
- Archipelago: Spratly Islands
- Area: 7.5 ha (19 acres)

Administration
- Vietnam
- District: Trường Sa district

Claimed by
- China
- Philippines
- Taiwan
- Vietnam

Cornwallis South Reef (Vietnamese: Đá Núi Le; Chinese: 南华礁; pinyin: Nanhua Dǎo), also known as Osmeña Reef (Filipino: Bahura ng Osmeña), is a coral atoll reef in the Spratly Islands in the South China Sea. It covers an area of about 10 by 5 kilometres (6.2 by 3.1 mi), and is entirely submerged at high tide.

== Territorial claims ==
The atoll is controlled by Vietnam, but is claimed by the Philippines and China as part of its claim to the entire Spratly Islands. In 2009, Vietnam, in a submission to the UN Commission on the Limits of the Continental Shelf (CLCS), accepted that its continental shelf did not include Cornwallis and therefore they have no entitlement to exploit it.

== Development ==
The atoll has been subjected to a small amount of development by Vietnam. Structures have been built at three points on the atoll, in 2014/15 two access channels were dredged to allow ships enter the lagoon, and in 2015 small-scale land reclamation was started beside the new access channels. Much of the reclamation work was washed away by Typhoon Melor in December 2015.

At the end of October 2022, Vietnam returned to building up the reef near the southwest entrance channel of the reef, close to Nui Le A Island. By 2025, the islands will have a total of 7.5 hectares (19 acres) distributed between Núi Le C: 5 hectares (12 acres) and Núi Le B: 2.5 hectares (6.2 acres).
