= Amboyna Cay =

Island in the South China Sea

Disputed island
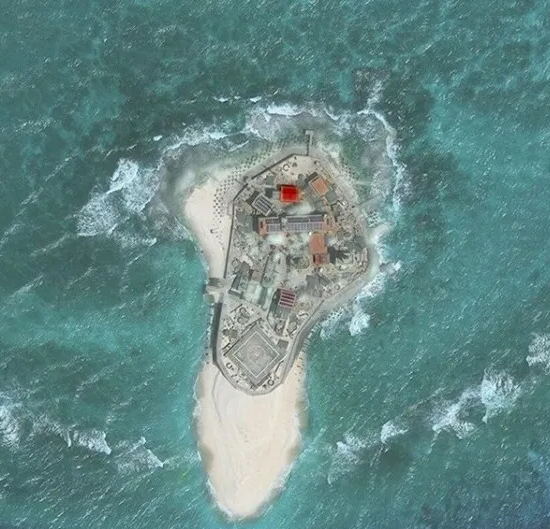
- Image by NASA

- Location within Spratly Islands
- Other names: Đảo An Bang (Vietnamese); Pulau Amboyna Kecil (Malay); Datu Kalantiaw Island (Philippine English); Pulo ng Datu Kalantiaw (Filipino) 安波沙洲 Ānbō Shāzhōu (Chinese)

Geography
- Location: South China Sea
- Coordinates: 07°53′31″N 112°55′17″E
- Archipelago: Spratly Islands

Administration
- Vietnam
- District: Trường Sa District
- Township: Trường Sa Township

Claimed by
- China
- Malaysia
- Philippines
- Taiwan
- Vietnam

Amboyna Cay (Vietnamese: Đảo An Bang; Malay: Pulau Amboyna Kecil; Filipino: Pulo ng Datu Kalantiaw, lit. 'Island of Datu Kalantiaw'; Chinese: 安波沙洲; pinyin: Ānbō Shāzhōu) is an island of the Spratly Islands group in the South China Sea located just outside (SW) of the southwest of Dangerous Ground. It is SW of Barque Canada Reef, south of the London Reefs, and NW of Swallow Reef.

With an area of 1.6 hectares (4.0 acres), it is the thirteenth largest naturally occurring Spratly island and the sixth largest amongst those occupied by Vietnam.

The island has two parts: the eastern part consists of sand and coral, and the west part is covered with guano. It has a fringing reef. An obelisk, about 2.7 metres (8 ft 10 in) high, stands on the SW corner. There is little vegetation. It is described by some as heavily fortified. A lighthouse has been operational on the island since May 1995.

The island is also claimed by China, Malaysia, the Philippines and Taiwan.

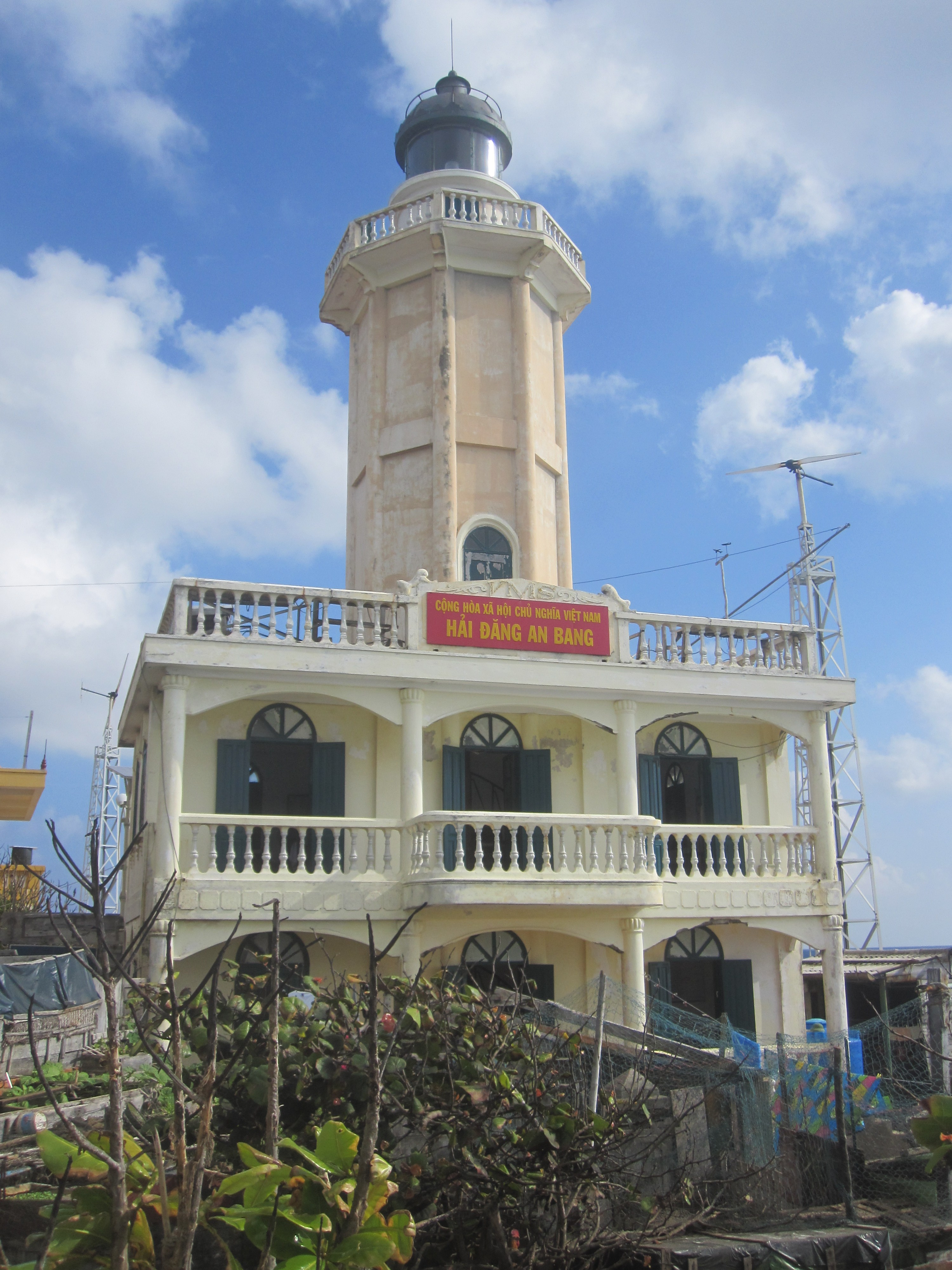
An Bang Lighthouse

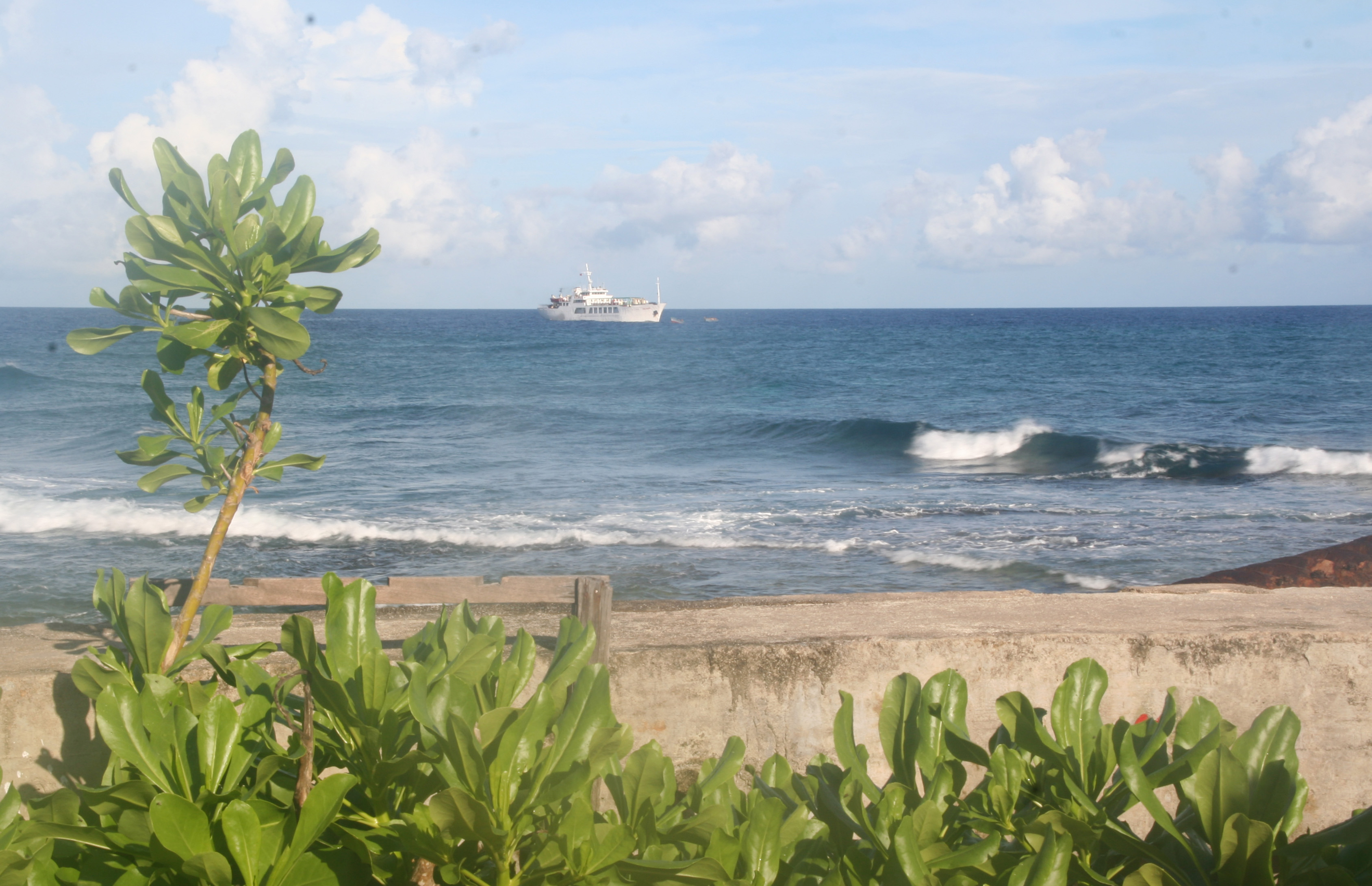
View from Amboyna Cay

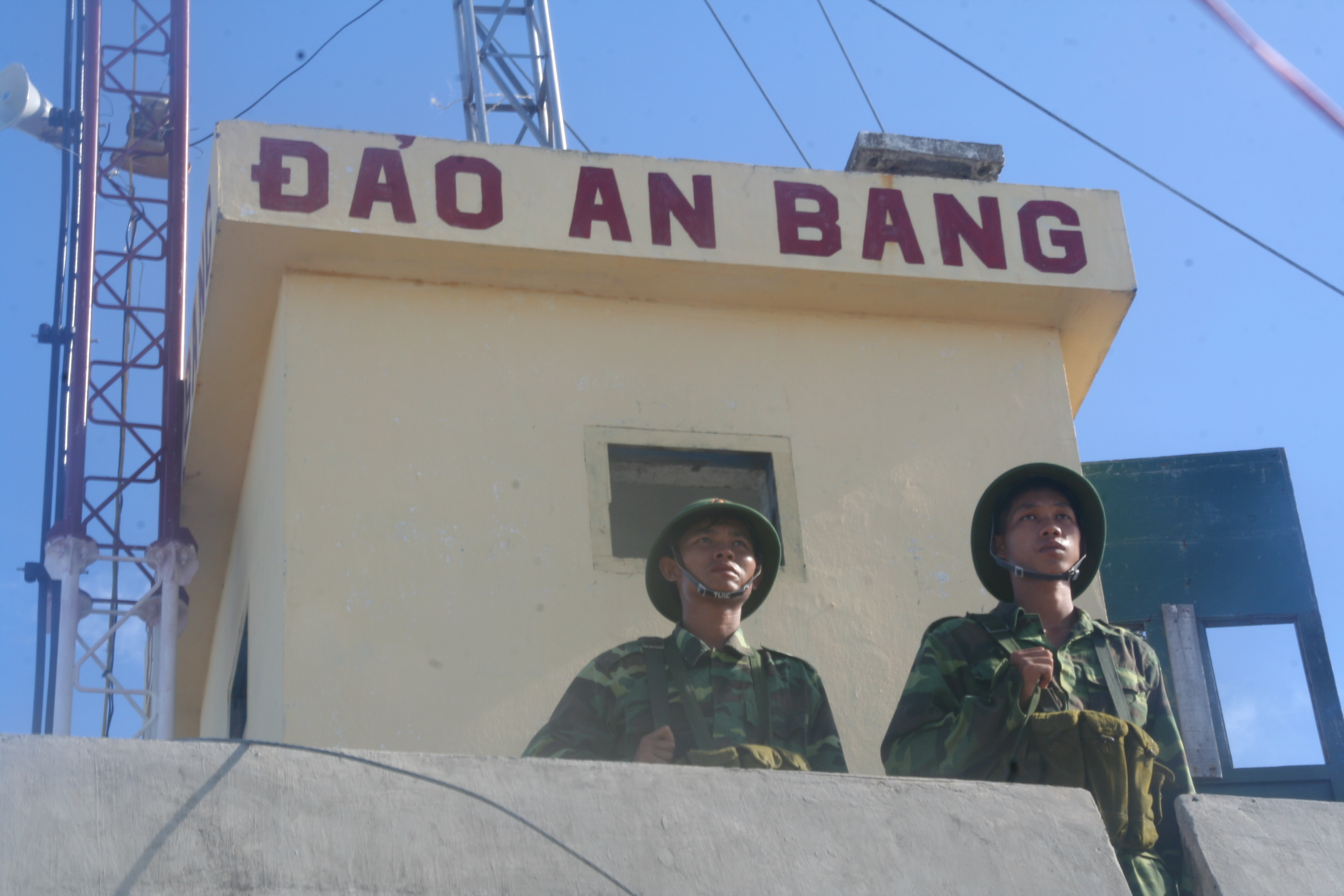
Vietnamese guards on Amboyna Cay

== Recent history ==
From 1956 on, in the face of Chinese and Philippine opposition, the Republic of Vietnam Navy began to launch various operations to reassert control over the Spratly Islands. Crewmembers erected sovereignty steles on almost all of them and built poles to hoist the Vietnamese flag. The cruiser Tuy Dong (HQ-04) was assigned these missions in August 1956.

On 20 May 1963, the Republic of Vietnam Navy landed on Amboyna Cay and rebuilt the sovereignty stele.

On 28 April 1975, the Vietnam People's Navy landed on Amboyna Cay but later left the cay due to harsh climate.

In 1978 the Royal Malaysian Navy landed on the island and placed markers. However, the markers were subsequently destroyed by Vietnam People's Navy who has returned and occupied the cay since 10 March 1978.

On 31 March 1979, forces occupying the cay fired warning shots at a boat transporting six amateur radio operators ("hams") attempting a DX-pedition to Amboyna Cay.

In 1983, a Singapore yacht operated by the owner and his wife transporting four German hams on a DX-pedition to Amboyna Cay was fired upon by Vietnamese forces. One of the hams, Diethelm Mueller, was hit by an artillery round and fell overboard. His body was never found. The yacht burned and the rest of the party drifted for 11 days on debris. Another ham, Gero Band, died of thirst the day before the survivors were rescued by a passing Japanese freighter which took them to Hong Kong.

== See also ==
- Spratly Islands dispute
