= DK1 =

DK1 can refer to:

- DK1 rigs, Vietnamese service stations in South China Sea
- Resurs-DK No.1, Earth observation satellite
- National road 1 (Poland) (Droga krajowa nr 1 in Polish)
- DK1 (train), earliest train design in the Beijing Subway rolling stock
- DK1, development kit for the head-mounted virtual reality display Oculus Rift
