= Bombay Castle (disambiguation) =

Bombay Castle is a fort in Mumbai (formerly Bombay)

Bombay Castle may also refer to:

- HMS Bombay Castle (1782), a third-rate ship of the Royal Navy that was wrecked in 1796
- Bombay Castle (1792 EIC ship), an East Indiaman that was at the action of 4 August 1800 and the Battle of Pulo Aura (1804)
- Bombay Castle (South China Sea), a shoal in the southern Spratly Islands
