= Beijing Subway Rolling Stock Equipment =

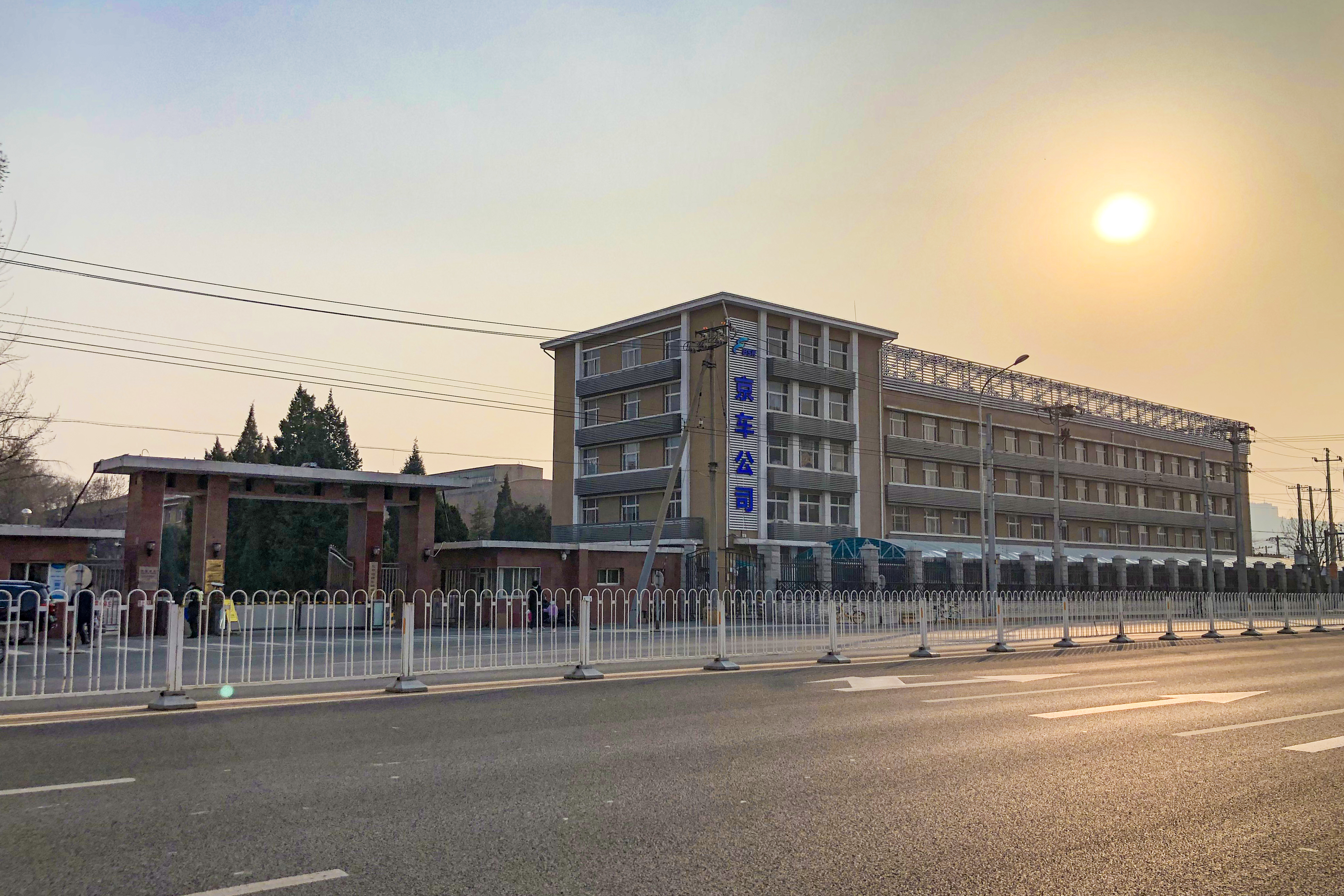
- Website: http://www.brsp.cn/

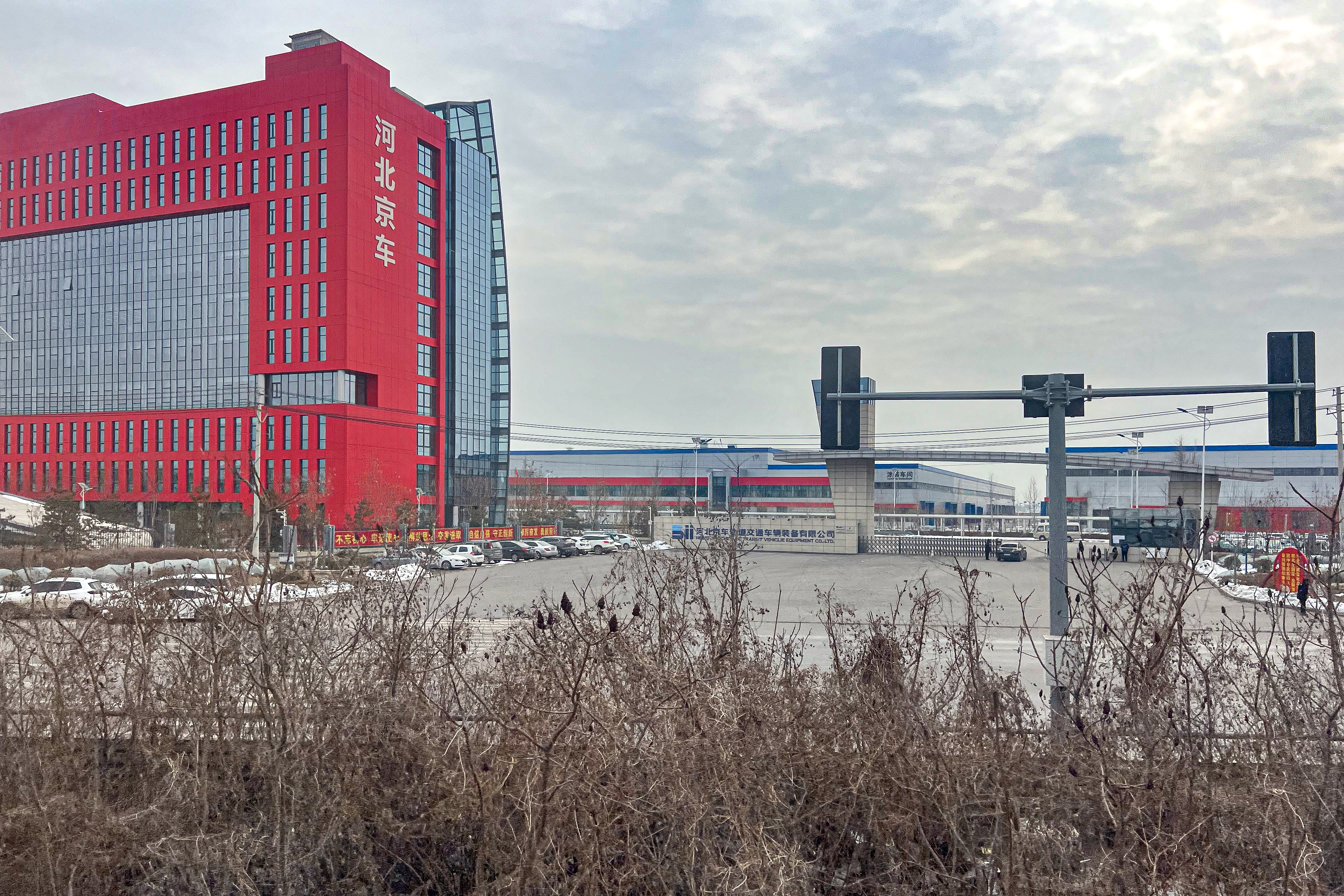
New plant in Mancheng, Baoding

Beijing Subway Rolling Stock Equipment Co., Ltd. (Chinese: 北京地铁车辆装备有限公司, abbreviated BSR), also known as the Beijing Subway Rolling Stock Factory (Chinese: 北京地铁车辆厂) is a subway rolling stock design, manufacture, assembly and maintenance facility in Beijing, China. It was founded in 1960 and is a subsidiary of the Beijing Rail Transit Technology and Equipment Group Co. Ltd. The factory provides local assemblage, maintenance and repair services for the Beijing Subway and Tianjin Metro. The plant refurbished the DK16 and DK20 trains for the Beijing Subway. BSR is one of two non-CRRC urban rail transit rolling stock manufacturer in mainland China as of 2024, the other being Shanghai Alstom Transportation Equipment.

The factory is linked by a crossover to Songjiazhuang Depot of Line 5, Beijing Subway (north of the depot) and is also linked by another crossover (south of the factory) to the Feng-shuang railway of China Railway.

== See also ==
- Beijing Subway
- Beijing Subway Rolling Stock
