= DK1 rigs =

Offshore platforms off the southern Vietnamese coast

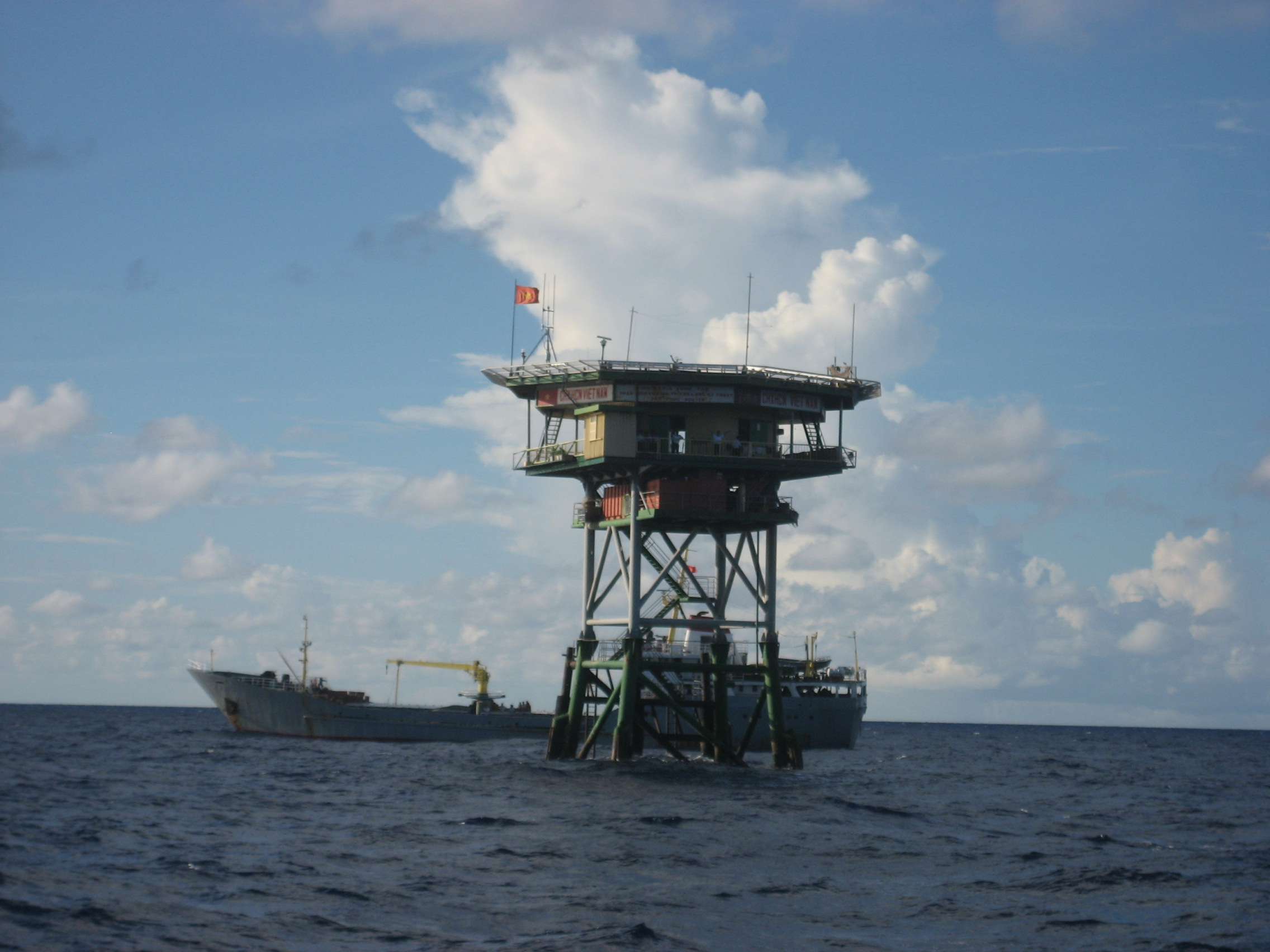
DK1/15 - Prince Consort Bank

The DK1 platforms (Vietnamese: Nhà giàn DK1, lit. 'DK1 rigs'), abbreviated from cụm Dịch vụ kinh tế - Khoa học kỹ thuật (lit. 'the Scientific & Technological - Economic Service compounds'), are a collection of offshore platforms built by Vietnam in the southern continental shelf of the country in the South China Sea. The platforms are complex steel structures composed of logistics and living facilities, manned by Vietnam People's Navy personnel.

== Background ==
In response to the PRC's expansion into the South China Sea (SCS), in the mid 1980s, the Socialist Republic of Vietnam predicted the need for it to protect itself. This led to the planning of, and in 1989, establishment of, the first DK1 platform.

== Locations ==
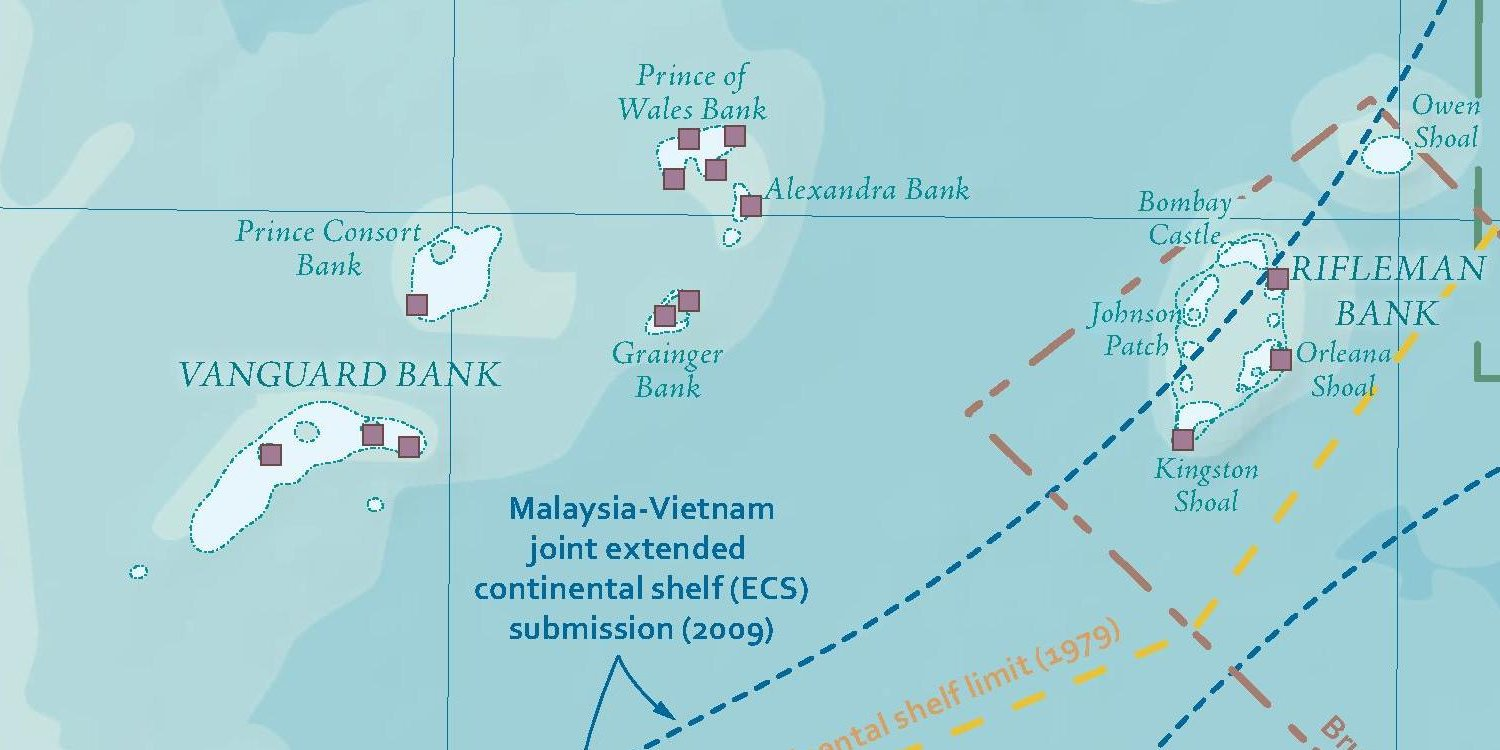
(Vietnamese) installations in the southwest area of the Spratly Islands (2015)

DK1 platforms have been established in seven localities in the southwest of the Spratly Archipelago and on the south of Vietnam's continental shelf at:

- Bãi cạn Tư Chính - Vanguard Bank
- Bãi cạn Phúc Tần - Prince of Wales Bank
- Bãi ngầm Ba Kè - Bombay Castle
- Bãi cạn Phúc Nguyên - Prince Consort Bank
- Bãi cạn Huyền Trân - Alexandra Bank
- Bãi cạn Quế Đường - Grainger Bank
- Bãi cạn Cà Mau - Off the Cà Mau peninsula, the southernmost part of Vietnam.

== Platforms ==
A total of 20 platforms have been built on the continental shelf in waters of depth from 7m (DK1/3) to 25m (DK1/15), from 1989 to 1998. Currently (2015) there are a total of 15 platforms in use. Facilities include 8 helicopter pads, 4 lighthouses, and a meteorological observatory. There are 14 platforms in the Spratly Islands, and one (DK1/10) in Ca Mau Shoals off the southwest coast of Vietnam.

=== Vanguard Bank (Vietnamese: Bãi Tư Chính) ===
The current (2015) cluster has 3 platforms in use.

- DK1/1: Completed 27 June 1989, is the 3rd construction. Currently not used.
- DK1/5: Completed 2 November 1989, is the 4th platform built. Currently not used.
- DK1/11: Completed 5 May 1994.
- DK1/12: Completed 8 August 1994.
- DK1/14: Completed 20 April 1995.

=== Prince of Wales Bank (Vietnamese: Bãi Phúc Tần) ===
The current (2015) cluster has 4 platforms in use.

- DK1/3: Completed 15 June 1989, was the first platform completed. It collapsed on the night of 4 December 1990 during a heavy storm.
- DK1/2: Completed 18 August 1993.
- DK1/16: Completed 20 August 1996.
- DK1/17: Completed 23 August 1996.
- DK1/18: Completed 13 April 1997. This platform includes a lighthouse.

=== Rifleman Bank (Vietnamese: Bãi Phúc Tần) ===
The current (2015) cluster has 3 platforms in use.

- DK1/4: Completed 16 June 1989, is the 2nd platform completed. It collapsed on the night of 4 December 1990 during a heavy storm.
- DK1/9: Completed 22 August 1993.
- DK1/20: Completed 13 August 1998.
- DK1/21: Completed 19 August 1998. This platform includes a lighthouse.

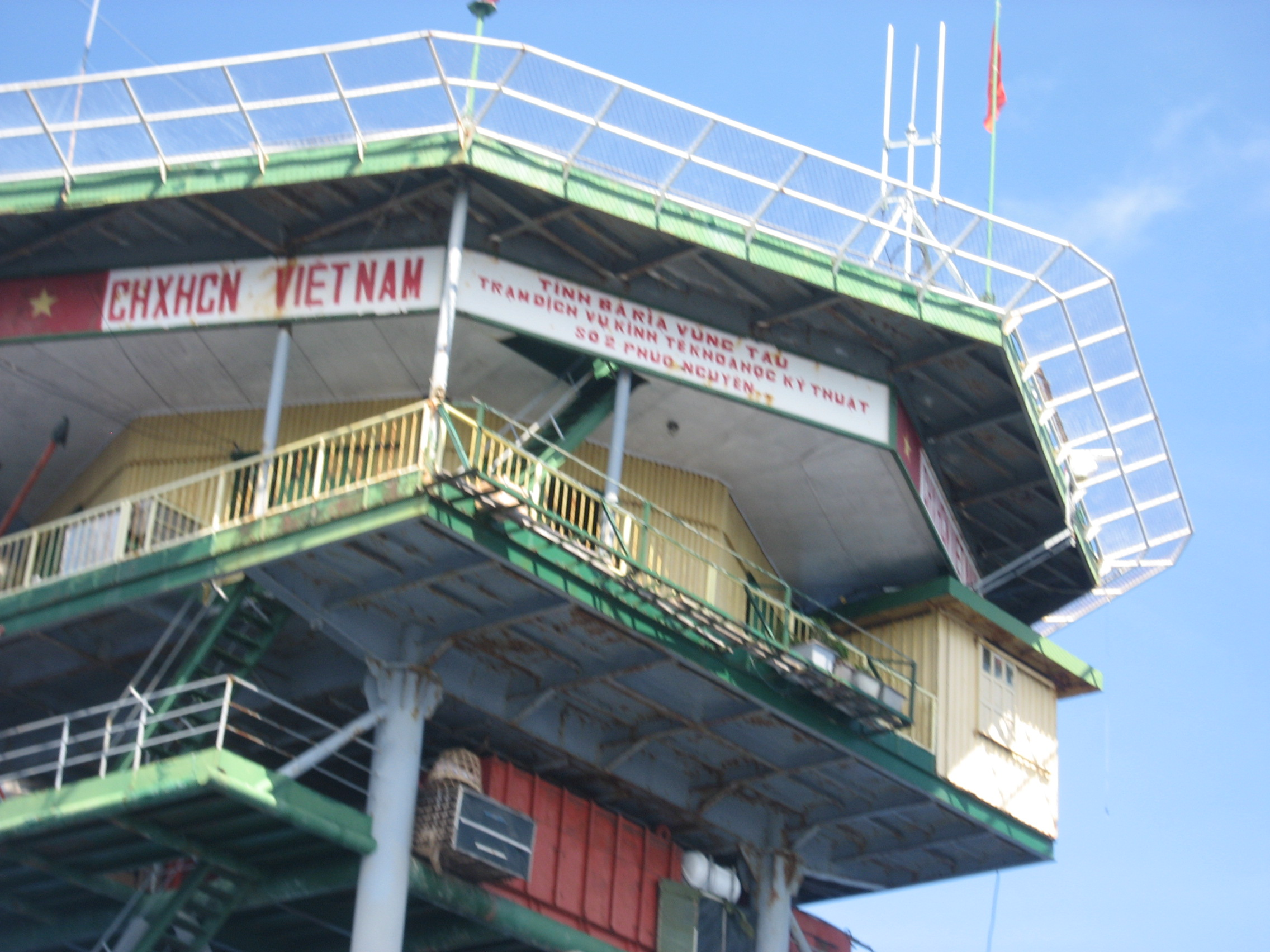
DK1/15

=== Prince Consort Bank (Vietnamese: Bãi Phúc Nguyên) ===
The current (2015) cluster has 1 platform in use.

- DK1/6: Completed 10 November 1990, is the 5th frame completed. It collapsed on the night of 4 December 1990 during a heavy storm.
- DK1/15: Completed in April 1995.
- 2A/DK1/6: Was completed 17 April 1995 using the foundations of the old DK1/6 platform. It collapsed during a storm on 13 December 1998.

=== Alexandra Bank (Vietnamese: Bãi Huyền Trân) ===
The current (2015) cluster has 1 platform in use.

- DK1/7: Completed 11 November 1991. Includes a lighthouse and a meteorological observatory.

=== Grainger Bank (Vietnamese: Bãi Quế Đường) ===
The current (2015) cluster has 2 platforms in use.

- DK1/8: Completed 4 November 1991. Includes a lighthouse.
- DK1/19: Completed 10 April 1997.
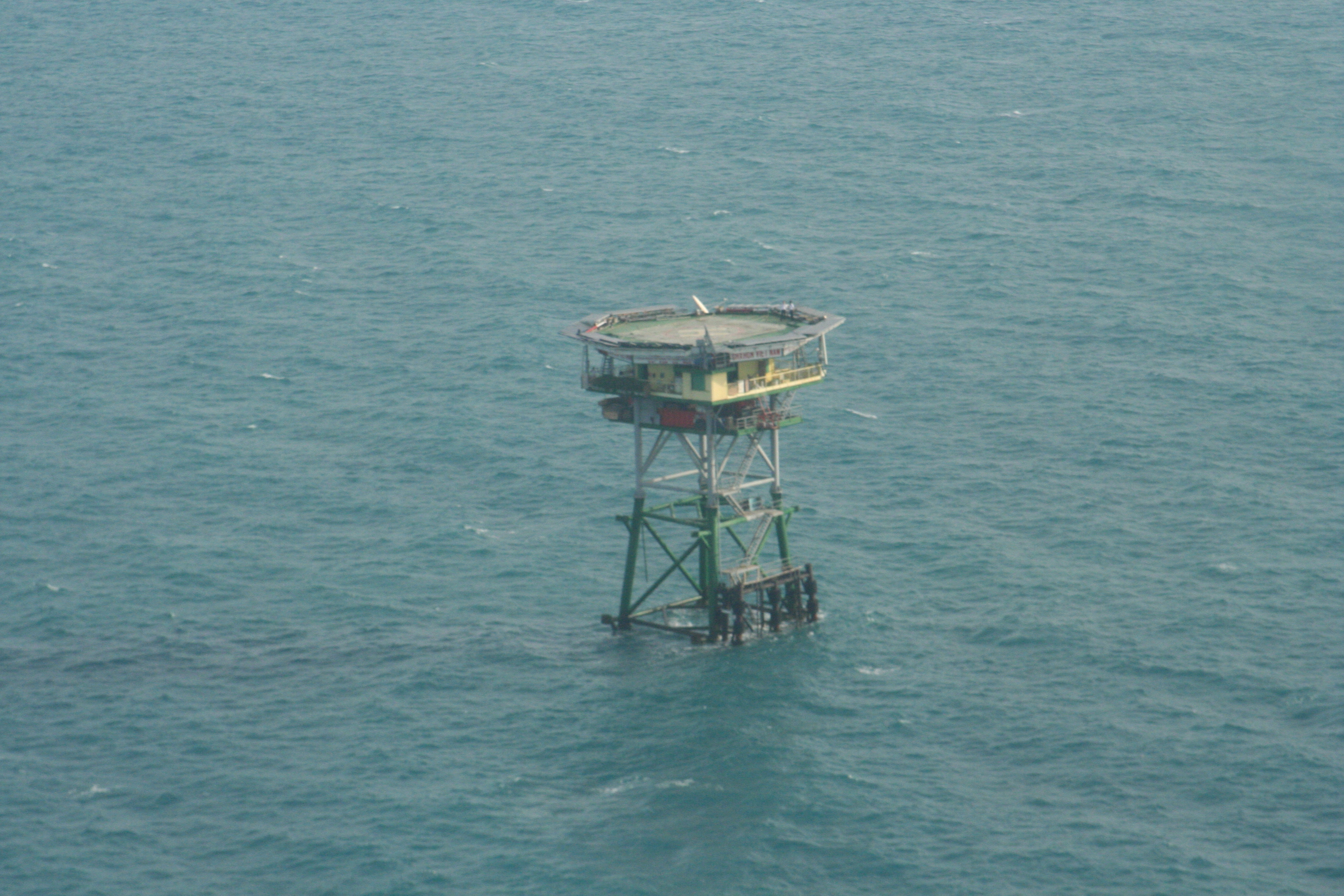
  DK1/10

=== Ca Mau Shoals (Vietnamese: Bãi Cà Mau) ===
The current (2015) cluster has 1 platform in use.

- DK1/10: Completed in 1994. 8.2536236°N 103.6628723°E
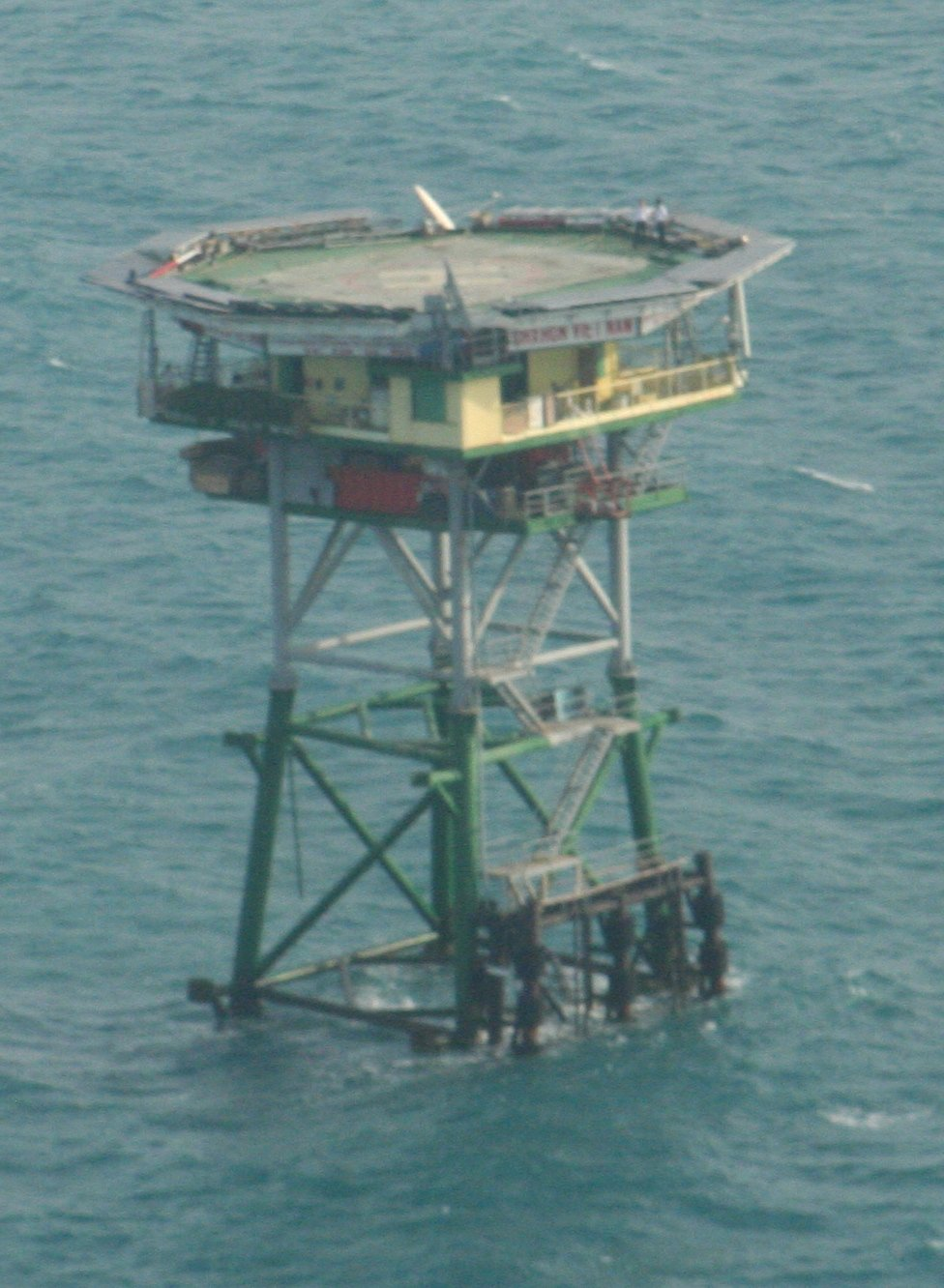
  DK1/10 - Cà Mau Shoals

== Summary ==
platform	Completed	Locality	Vicinity	Notes
DK1/01	27 Jun 1989	Vanguard Bank	Vanguard Bank	Not in use
DK1/02	18 Aug 1993	Prince of Wales Bank	Southwest Banks	
DK1/03	15 Jun 1989	Prince of Wales Bank	Southwest Banks	Collapsed 4 Dec 1990
DK1/04	16 Jun 1989	Bombay Castle	Rifleman Bank	Collapsed 4 Dec 1990
DK1/05	2 Nov 1989	Vanguard Bank	Vanguard Bank	Not in use
DK1/06	10 Nov 1990	Prince Consort Bank	Southwest Banks	Collapsed 4 Dec 1990
DK1/06/2A	17 Apr 1995	Prince Consort Bank	Southwest Banks	Collapsed 13 Dec 1998
DK1/07	11 Nov 1991	Alexandra Bank	Southwest Banks	Includes a lighthouse and a meteorological observatory
DK1/08	4 Nov 1991	Grainger Bank	Southwest Banks	Includes a lighthouse
DK1/09	22 Aug 1993	Bombay Castle	Rifleman Bank	
DK1/10	1994	Ca Mau Shoals	Ca Mau Shoals	
DK1/11	5 May 1994	Vanguard Bank	Vanguard Bank	
DK1/12	8 Aug 1994	Vanguard Bank	Vanguard Bank	
DK1/14	20 Apr 1995	Vanguard Bank	Vanguard Bank	
DK1/15	Apr 1995	Prince Consort Bank	Southwest Banks	
DK1/16	20 Aug 1996	Prince of Wales Bank	Southwest Banks	
DK1/17	23 Aug 1996	Prince of Wales Bank	Southwest Banks	
DK1/18	13 Apr 1997	Prince of Wales Bank	Southwest Banks	Includes a lighthouse
DK1/19	10 Apr 1997	Grainger Bank	Southwest Banks	
DK1/20	13 Aug 1998	Bombay Castle	Rifleman Bank	
DK1/21	19 Aug 1998	Bombay Castle	Rifleman Bank	Includes a lighthouse

== See also ==
- List of maritime features in the Spratly Islands
- vi:DK1
