= Beijing Subway rolling stock =

All Beijing Subway trains run on 1,435 mm (4 ft 8 1/2 in) standard gauge rail and draw power from the 750 V DC third rail, except those on Lines 6, 11 14, 16, 17 and 19, which use 1,500 V DC overhead wires. Lines 6, 15, Fangshan, and Changping lines have a designed maximum service speed of 100 km/h (62 mph). The Airport Line is linear motor driven with a designed maximum service speed of 110 km/h (68 mph) All other Lines have a maximum service speed of 80 km/h (50 mph). Currently, Lines 1, 2, 4, 5, 8, 9, 10, 13, 15, 18, Batong, Daxing, Changping, Fangshan, Yanfang, and Yizhuang lines use 6 car B size trains. Initially, the Batong line and Line 13 was originally used 4 car trains and now expanded into six.

== Type B Trains ==
The most common rolling stock of the Beijing Subway is the Type-B car, which has a carrying capacity of 245 passengers per car and top speed of 80 km/h (50 mph), drawing 750 V DC power from the third rail. Most lines operate the six-car Type-B train set that can carry 1,460 passengers per train and transport 43,800 passengers per hour. Lines 6 and 7 use eight-car Type-B train sets that can carry 1,960 passengers per train and 58,800 passengers per hour. The Type-B trains sets of Lines 6 and 7 can draw 1,500 V DC power and can reach 100 km/h (62 mph). The Yanfang Line operates four-car Type-B train sets with ”driverless” automatic train operation.

== Type A Trains ==
Type-A cars run on Lines 3, 11, 12, 14, 16, 17, 19. They are 3.1 meters longer, and 20 cm wider than Type-B cars with a designed capacity of 310 passengers per car and 10 sets of doors per train compared to 8 sets of doors per train on Type-B cars. Type A cars draw 1,500 V DC power from overhead wire and can reach 100 km/h (62 mph). Line 14 uses six-car Type A train sets which can carry 1,860 passengers per train and allow for throughput of up to 55,800 passengers per hour per direction. Lines 3, 12, 16, 17, and 19 uses eight-car Type-A train sets which can carry 2,480 passengers per train and allow for throughput of up 74,400 passengers per hour per direction.

== Type L trains ==
The Capital Airport Express has its distinct 4-car linear motor train sets, powered by 750 V DC electricity via the third rail, and can reach a maximum speed of 110 km/h (68 mph). The under construction Line 28 will also use L type trains but 6 cars long.

== Type D Trains ==
The Daxing Airport Express uses Type-D train sets with top operational speed of 160 km/h (99 mph). These trains are powered by 25 kV 50 Hz AC overhead wires. The eight-car train sets have seven passenger cars and one car to carry luggage. The under construction Line 22 will also use eight-car Type-D trains.

== Maglev ==
The S1 Line's maglev trains feature six-car train sets that run on 1,500 V DC power and can reach 100 km/h (62 mph). Compared to subway trains that run on conventional track, the maglev train has a smaller minimum turning radius of 75 meters compared to 200 meters, can climb steeper slope of 53‰ versus 40‰ and emits less noise. The six-car train set can carry 1,032 passengers.

== Light Rail Transit ==
The Xijiao LRT and Yizhuang Tram Line T1 operates five-car trams that draw 750 V DC from overhead lines and can reach 70 km/h (43 mph).

== Manufacturers ==
From the subway's inception to 2003, all Beijing subway trains were manufactured by CNR Changchun Railway Vehicles Co. Ltd. All rolling stock on Lines 2, 5, 6, 9, 10, 13, 15, Yizhuang line, Capital Airport Express and some of Line 1, 14, 16, and Yanfang line stocks are produced by CNR Changchun. However, CSR Qingdao Sifang Co., Ltd. has recently produced rolling stock for the Beijing subway. CSR Sifang produced all the trains for Lines 4, 8, Daxing, Changping, Daxing Airport Express and some of Line 1, 14, 16, and Yanfang line.

The Beijing Subway Rolling Stock Equipment Co. Ltd., a wholly owned subsidiary of the Beijing Mass Transit Railway Operation Corp., provides local assemblage, maintenance and repair services. It has also made trains for line 7, Batong, and Fangshan lines.

== History ==
=== First Generation ===
In the 1960s to mid-1970s, the Beijing Subway used DK2 and DK3 models made in Changchun. The DK stands for diandong keche or electrically-operated passenger car. These models and their derivatives, the DK3G, DK20, DK16A, BD1 and BD2 are classified by the Beijing Subway as the first generation. In recent decades, the Beijing Subway Rolling Stock Equipment Co. refurbished the DK16A and DK20 models, which remained in use well into the first decade of the 21st century. The refurbished DK16AG trains entered into service on Line 2 in 2005.

=== Second Generation ===
From the 1980 to the early 1990s, the subway introduced several new models including the DK6, DK9 and their derivatives the DK11, DK16 and GTO. The M-series trains that appeared on Lines 2 and 13 were made by Japan's Tokyu Car Corporation.

=== Third Generation ===
In 1998, the subway began deploying a new generation of train sets that featured variable voltage variable frequency (VVVF) control mechanisms. These models include the DKZ4, DKZ5, and the DKZ6. DKZ stands for diandong keche zu or electric passenger train sets. CNR Changchun also made 174 DK28-DK31 metro cars, which uses VVVF inverters and AC motors for Line 1, and 136 DK32-34 trains for Line 13. In 2005, the Batong line began using SFX01 and SFX02 trains made by CSR Qingdao Sifang. The 40 trains of the Airport Express were made by a joint-venture between CRRC Changchun and Bombardier Transportation, and uses Bombardier's Innovia Advanced Rapid Transit (ART) 200 technology.

=== Fourth Generation ===
Since 2017, trains have been ordered with capabilities for unattended automatic train operation. Starting with the DKZ70 and SFM16 trains on the Yanfang Line. Since then trains on the Daxing Airport Express, Lines 11, 17 and 19 operate or are capable of operating in GoA4 unattended train operation mode.

== Fleet ==
=== Current ===
Model	Image	Type	Manufacturer	Year built	Amount in service	Fleet numbers	Line(s) Served	Depot	Notes
DKZ4		6B	Changchun Passenger Car Factory; Beijing Subway Rolling Stock Equipment	1998	31	S401–S431 (01 001-01 031)	1 Batong	Sihui	Refurbished 2007, currently being retired
DKZ5		6B	CNR Changchun; Beijing Subway Rolling Stock Equipment	2002	55	H401; H403–H456	13	Huilongguan	Refurbished 2015–2018, being replaced by new ZBM15s
DKZ6		6B	CNR Changchun	2002	1	H402	13	Huilongguan	Refurbished 2015–2018, being replaced by new ZBM15s
SFM01		6B	CSR Qingdao Sifang; Beijing Subway Rolling Stock Equipment	2003	19	TQ401–TQ408 (01 071–01 078); TQ415–TQ424 (01 085–01 094)	1 Batong	Tuqiao	Refurbished 2015–2019
SFM02		6B	CSR Qingdao Sifang	2003	5	TQ409–TQ414 (01 079–01 084)	1 Batong	Tuqiao	Refurbished 2015–2019
DKZ13		6B	CNR Changchun; Beijing Subway Rolling Stock Equipment	2006	61	TP401–TP461 (Refurbished: 05 001-05 061)	5	Taipingzhuang; Songjiazhuang	Currently being refurbished
DKZ16		6B	CNR Changchun; Beijing Subway Rolling Stock Equipment	2006	50	T401–T450 (02 001-02 050)	2	Taipinghu	Refurbished 2022-2024
SFM04		6B	CSR Qingdao Sifang	2006	39	G432–G470 (01 032-01 070)	1 Batong	Gucheng	
DKZ15		6B	CNR Changchun; Beijing Subway Rolling Stock Equipment; CNR Dalian	2007	43	W401–W443 (10 001-10 043)	10	Wanliu; Wulu	Refurbished 2020-2024
QKZ5		4L_{B}	CNR Changchun; Bombardier	2007	10	L1 101–L1 110	Capital Airport	Tianzhu	Based on the INNOVIA ART 200
SFM05		6B	CSR Qingdao Sifang	2008; 2010	73	001–053; 061–093	4 Daxing	Longbeicun; Majiapu; Nanzhaolu	
SFM07		6B	CSR Qingdao Sifang; Beijing Subway Rolling Stock Equipment	2008	6	TQ425–TQ430	1 Batong	Tuqiao	Refurbished 2016–2019
BJD01		6B	Beijing Subway Rolling Stock Equipment; CNR Changchun	2009	21	FS001–FS021	Fangshan	Yancun	
SFM13		6B	CSR Qingdao Sifang	2009-2010	15	CP001–CP015	Changping	Dingsi Road; Ming Tombs	
DKZ31		6B	CNR Changchun	2010	28	15 001–15 028	15	Maquanying; Fengbo	
DKZ32		6B	CNR Changchun	2010	23	YZ001–YZ023	Yizhuang	Songjiazhuang; Taihu	
SFM12		6B	CSR Qingdao Sifang; Beijing Subway Rolling Stock Equipment	2010	40	08 001–08 040	8	Pingxifu; Yinghai	
DKZ33		6B	CNR Changchun	2011	24	09 001–09 024	9	Guogongzhuang	
DKZ34		6B	CNR Changchun; Beijing Subway Rolling Stock Equipment; CNR Dalian	2011; 2013	41; 32	10 044–10 084; 10 085–10 116	10	Wanliu; Wulu	
DKZ47		8B	CNR Changchun; Beijing Subway Rolling Stock Equipment	2011-2014	64	06 001–06 064	6	Wulu; Wuliqiao; Dongxiaoying	
DKZ53		6A	CNR Changchun	2012	38	201–238	14	Maquanying; Zhangyicun	
SFM18		6A	CSR Qingdao Sifang	2012	25	239–263	14	Maquanying; Zhangyicun	
BDK01		8B	Beijing Subway Rolling Stock Equipment	2013	35	07 001–07 035	7	Jiaohuachang; Zhangjiawan	
SFM21		6B	CRRC Qingdao Sifang	2014-2019	17	CP016–CP032	Changping	Dingsi Road; Ming Tombs	
DKZ76		4B	CRRC Changchun	2014-2016	15	YF001–YF015	Yanfang	Yancun North	
SFM16		4B	CRRC Qingdao Sifang	2016	1	YF016	Yanfang	Yancun North	
DKZ93		8A	CRRC Changchun	2016-2019	35	301–335	16	Beianhe; Yushuzhuang	
SFM40		8A	CRRC Qingdao Sifang	2016-2019	29	336–364	16	Beianhe; Yushuzhuang	
SFM42		6B	CRRC Qingdao Sifang; Beijing Subway Rolling Stock Equipment	2016-2018	72	08 041–08 112	8	Pingxifu; Yinghai	Additional units for the Line 8 South extension
DKZ106		8B	CRRC Changchun	2017-2018	20	06 065–06 084	6	Wulu; Wuliqiao; Dongxiaoying	
BDK03		6B	Beijing Subway Rolling Stock Equipment	2019–2020	23	FS022–FS044	Fangshan	Yancun	Additional units for the Fangshan line northern extension
BDK04		6B	Beijing Subway Rolling Stock Equipment	2019	14	09 025–09 038	9	Guogongzhuang	
BDK05		8B	Beijing Subway Rolling Stock Equipment	2019	33	07 036–07 068	7	Jiaohuachang; Zhangjiawan	
BDK06		6B	Beijing Subway Rolling Stock Equipment	2019–	12	TQ431–TQ437 01108-01112	1 Batong	Tuqiao; Sihui	Additional trainsets for the 1-Batong merge project
GSYE20		8D	CRRC Qingdao Sifang	2019	8	JC001–JC008	Daxing Airport	Cigezhuang; New Airport North	Cinova-160 based on CRH6
GSYE23		4D	CRRC Qingdao Sifang	2020	4	JC401–JC404	Daxing Airport	Cigezhuang; New Airport North	Cinova-160 based on CRH6
CJ3 City Type		8D	CRRC Changchun	2019	2	JC009-JC010	Daxing Airport	Cigezhuang; New Airport North	
SFM79		8A	CRRC Qingdao Sifang	2019–	35	501–518, 539–555	17	Ciqunan; Xiejiacun	
CCD5035		8A	CRRC Changchun	2019–	35	501–518, 539–555	17	Ciqunan; Xiejiacun	
SFM80		8A	CRRC Qingdao Sifang	2019–	25	19 001–19 025	19	Xingong	
CCD5034		8A	CRRC Changchun	2019–	25	19 001–19 025	19	Xingong	
ZBM04		4A	Beijing Subway Rolling Stock Equipment	2020	5	11 001–11 005	11	—N/a	
CCD3004		4L_{B}	CRRC Changchun	2021	5	L1 111–L1 115	Capital Airport	Tianzhu	Based on the INNOVIA ART 200
ZBM06		4A, 8A	Beijing Subway Rolling Stock Equipment	2019-2022	40	03 001-03 040	3	Dongba	Are capable of coupling 2 of 4-car units together to form 8-car trains
SFM86		4A, 8A	CRRC Qingdao Sifang	2019-2022	40	03 001-03 040	3	Dongba	Are capable of coupling 2 of 4-car units together to form 8-car trains
BDK07		6B	Beijing Subway Rolling Stock Equipment	2020-2022	18	CP033–CP050	Changping	Dingsi Road; Ming Tombs	Additional trainsets for the Changping Line south extension
SFM93		6B	CRRC Qingdao Sifang	2020-2022	18	CP051–CP068	Changping	Dingsi Road; Ming Tombs	Additional trainsets for the Changping Line south extension
BDK08		6B	Beijing Subway Rolling Stock Equipment	2020-2023	33	15 035-15 056	15	Maquanying; Fengbo	
CCD5049		4A, 8A	CRRC Changchun	2020-2023	84	12 001-12 084	12	Dongba	Are capable of coupling 2 of 4-car units together to form 8-car trains
ZBM05		4A, 8A	Beijing Subway Rolling Stock Equipment	2020-2023	84	12 001-12 084	12	Dongba	Are capable of coupling 2 of 4-car units together to form 8-car trains
ZBM13		8B	Beijing Subway Rolling Stock Equipment	2023-2024	8	06 085–06 092	6	Wulu; Wuliqiao; Dongxiaoying	
ZBM15		6B	Beijing Subway Rolling Stock Equipment	2023-2024	44	13 001-13 044	13 18	Huilongguan	Some used in Line 18 temporary service

=== Former ===
Model	Image	Manufacturer	Year built	Number Made	Line(s) Served	Years in Service	Fleet numbers (Before 1996)	Fleet numbers (After 1996)	Notes
DK1		Changchun Passenger Car Factory	1967	2	—N/a	—N/a	001–002	—N/a	Never ran in service.
DK2		Changchun Passenger Car Factory	1969–1970	80	1	1969–1985	201–219	—N/a	76 cars were refurbished into DK11.
DK3		Changchun Passenger Car Factory	1971–1973	50	1	1971-2002	Unknown	G101–G107	
DK3		Changchun Passenger Car Factory	1971–1973	50	2	1987-1989	Unknown	—N/a	
DK3		Changchun Passenger Car Factory	1971–1973	50	13	2002-2003	—N/a	H101–H114	
DK3		Changchun Passenger Car Factory	1971–1973	50	Batong	2003-2005	—N/a	TQ101-TQ114	
DK6		Changchun Passenger Car Factory	1979	4	2	1984–2008	501	T1193–T1194	Cars T1193–T1194 were linked with DK9 cars T1191–T1192 and T1195–T1196 in 1996.
DK8		Changchun Passenger Car Factory	1982	52	2	1984–2008	401–413	T101–T104, T106–T108, T1093–T1094, T3023, T3024, T304	Some cars were retrofitted with GTO chopper controls.
DK8		Changchun Passenger Car Factory	1982	52	1	1987-1995	401–413	—N/a	Some cars were retrofitted with GTO chopper controls.
DK8		Changchun Passenger Car Factory	1982	52	13	2002-2003	—N/a	H115-H118	Some cars were retrofitted with GTO chopper controls.
DK8		Changchun Passenger Car Factory	1982	52	Batong	2003-2005	—N/a	TQ115-TQ118	Some cars were retrofitted with GTO chopper controls.
DK9		Changchun Passenger Car Factory	1983	4	2	1984–2008	502	T1191–T1192, T1195–T1196	Linked with DK6 cars T1193–T1194 in 1996.
M		Tokyu Car Corporation	1984	3	2	1984–1995	—N/a		
M		Tokyu Car Corporation	1984	3	13	2002-2003	—N/a	H301	
DK11		Changchun Passenger Car Factory	1984–1985	76	1	1984–2008	601–619	G201–G207, G2082–G2085, G209–G213	
DK11		Changchun Passenger Car Factory	1984–1985	76	2	1984–1989	601–619	—N/a	
DK16		Changchun Passenger Car Factory	1986–1989	115	2	1987–2009	430–441, 4421–4423	T1091–T1092, T1095–T1096, T110–T118, T120–T122, T124–T127, T1281–T1285, T3021–T3022, T3025–T3026, T303	Several cars were retrofitted with GTO chopper controls.
DK16		Changchun Passenger Car Factory	1986–1989	115	1	1987-1995	430–441, 4421–4423	—N/a	Several cars were retrofitted with GTO chopper controls.
DKZ1		Changchun Passenger Car Factory	1987	3	2	1987–1995	701	—N/a	
DKZ1		Changchun Passenger Car Factory	1987	3	13	2002-2003	—N/a	H302	
DK19		Changchun Passenger Car Factory	1989	1	2	1989–2008	4424	T1286	Linked with DK16 cars T1281–T1285.
BD1		Beijing Subway Rolling Stock Equipment	1989–1992	24	1	1990–1994	308–311	—N/a	
BD1		Beijing Subway Rolling Stock Equipment	1989–1992	24	2	1994–2008	308–311	T129–T132	
DK20		Changchun Passenger Car Factory	1994–1995	42	1	1994–2012	443–449	G108–G114	Originally retired in 2008, reactivated due to DKZ4 trains being overhauled.
BD2		Beijing Subway Rolling Stock Equipment	1994–1998	72	1	1995–2012	450–454 (first batch only)	G115–G126	Originally retired in 2008, reactivated due to DKZ4 trains being overhauled.
BD3		Beijing Subway Rolling Stock Equipment	1995	2	1	1996–2001	—N/a	G2081, G2086	Linked with DK11 cars G2082–G2085.
BD8		Beijing Subway Rolling Stock Equipment	2000	1	13	2002-2003	—N/a	H303	Formerly used by Tianjin Metro.
BD11		Beijing Subway Rolling Stock Equipment	2000	12	2	2000-2004	—N/a	T305–T306	
DKZ10		CNR Changchun	2005	1	13	2006-2010	—N/a	H457	Retired due to reliability issues.
