= Bombay Castle (South China Sea) =

Shoal with a lighthouse in the South China Sea

Disputed reef
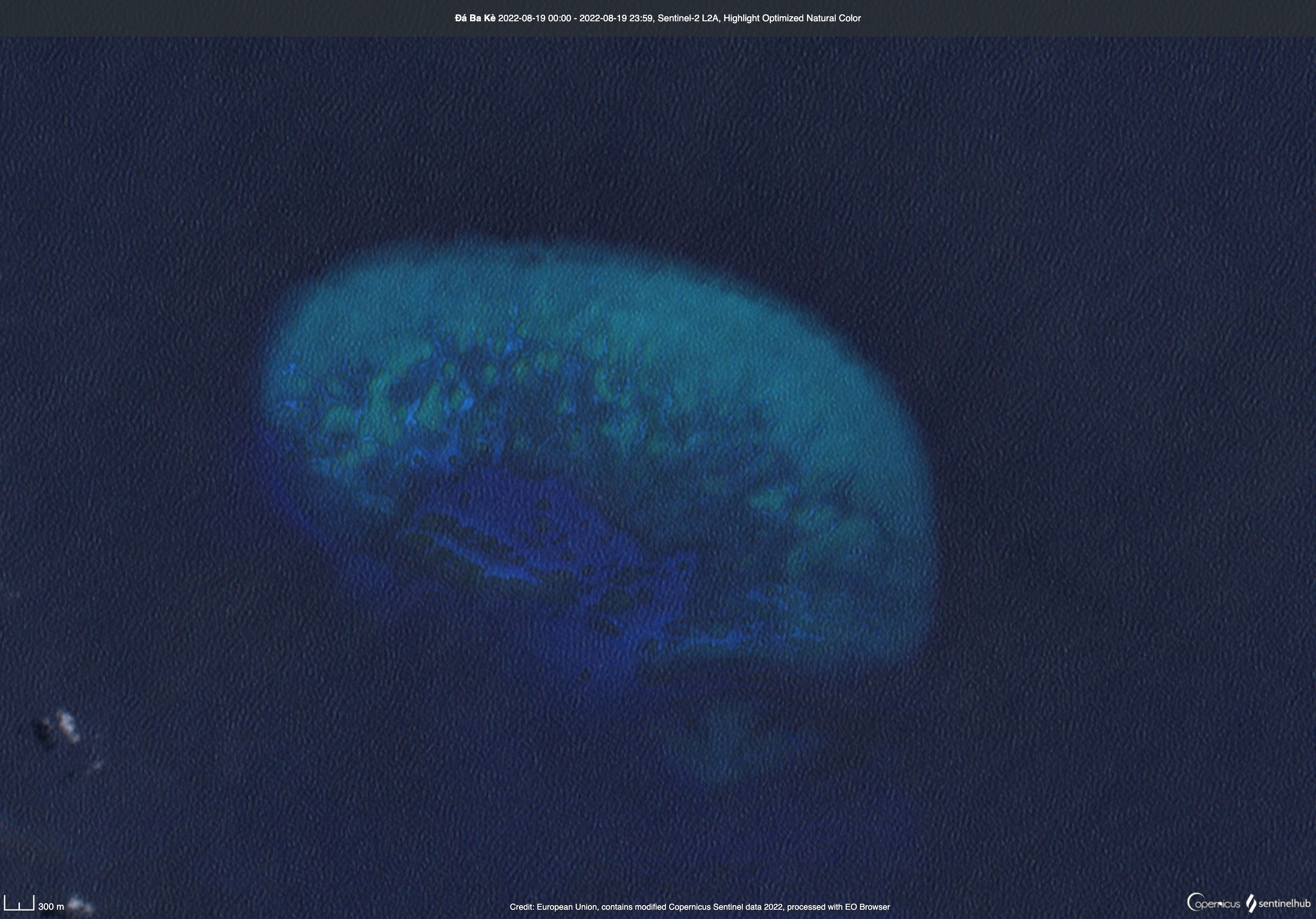
- Bombay Castle

- Location within Spratly Islands
- Other names: Đá Ba Kè (Vietnamese) 蓬勃堡 Péngbó Bǎo (Chinese)

Geography
- Location: South China Sea
- Coordinates: 07°50′N 111°40′E
- Archipelago: Spratly Islands

Administration
- Vietnam
- District: Trường Sa District
- Township: Trường Sa Township

Claimed by
- Brunei
- China
- Taiwan
- Vietnam

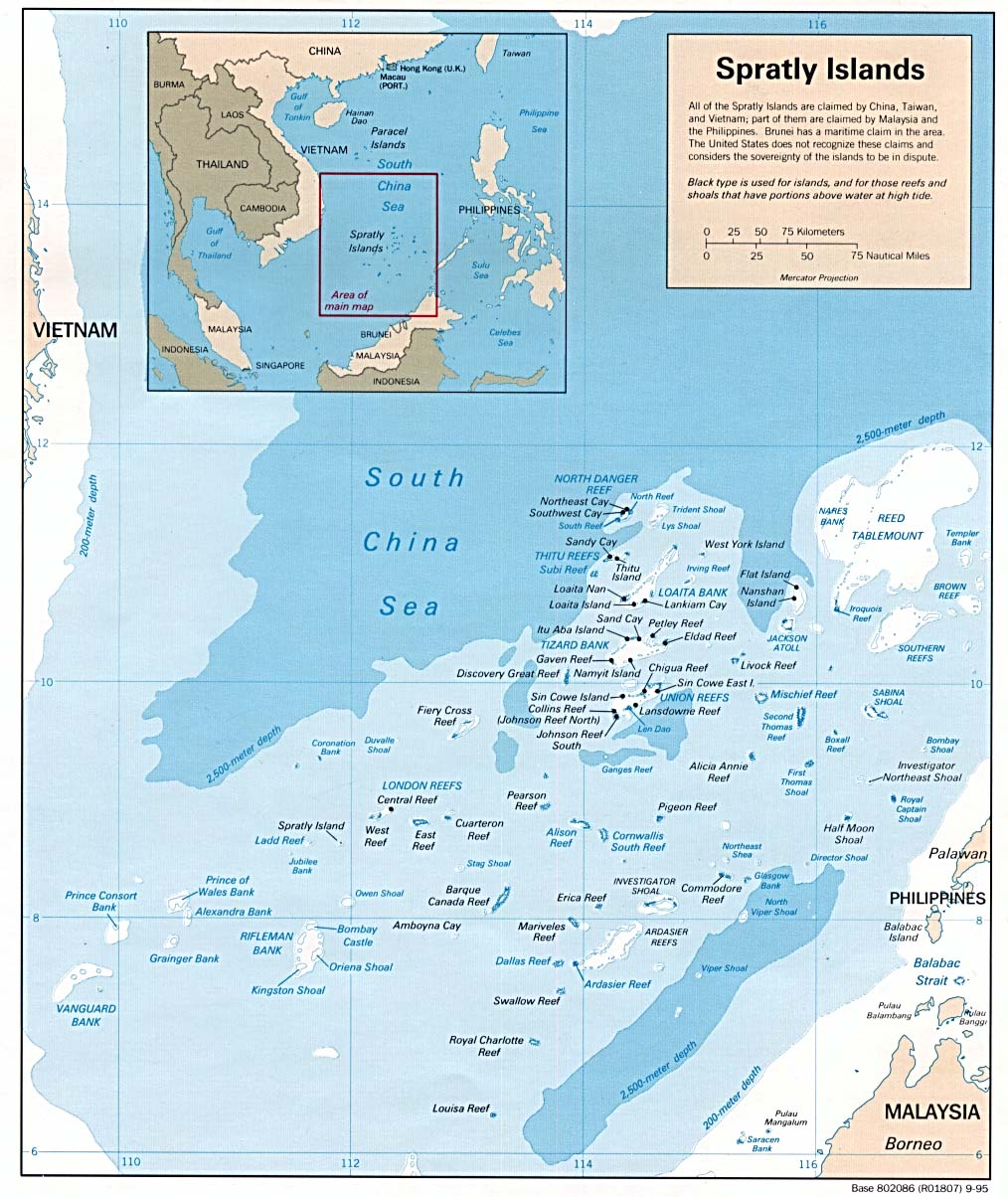
Map of the Spratly Islands showing Bombay Castle and Rifleman Bank

Bombay Castle, also known in Vietnamese: Đá Ba Kè; Mandarin Chinese: 蓬勃堡; pinyin: Péngbó Bǎo;, is a reef with a lighthouse in the Rifleman Bank of the southern Spratly Islands. It is occupied by Vietnam, but also claimed by China (PRC) and Taiwan (ROC).

== Location and topography ==
Bombay Castle consists of a submerged reef located between 07°50′N 111°40′E and 07°56′N 111°42′E (between 7.833°N 111.667°E and 7.933°N 111.700°E) at the northern end of Rifleman Bank. At its shallowest point, it has a depth of 3 metres (9.8 ft) consisting of sand and coral. It is 80 miles (130 km) east of Huyền Trân (Alexandra Bank) and nearly 80 miles (130 km) west of An Bang (Amboyna Cay).

Bombay Castle has a 22.5 metres (74 ft) tall lighthouse on steel pilings that was built in 1995. The lighthouse is two storied, with accommodation for the lighthouse keepers and a dish antenna.

The reef is named after the East Indiaman Bombay Castle.

== DK1 rigs ==
In addition to the lighthouse (DK1/21), three other DK1 rigs ("economic, scientific and technological service stations") have been constructed by Vietnam in this area. The current (2015) cluster has 3 rigs in use.

- DK1/4: Completed 16 June 1989, was the 2nd DK1 rig completed. It collapsed on the night of 4 December 1990 during a heavy storm.
- DK1/9: Completed 22 August 1993.
- DK1/20: Completed 13 August 1998.
- DK1/21: Completed 19 August 1998. This rig includes a lighthouse.

== See also ==
- List of maritime features in the Spratly Islands
