= Bombay Castle (1792 EIC ship) =

18th Century Cargo Ship

History

Great Britain
- Name: Bombay Castle
- Namesake: Bombay Castle
- Owner: EIC voyage #1:James Fearns; EIC voyages #2-4:Alexander Montgomerie; EIC voyages #5-6: Joseph Dorin
- Builder: Randall, Rotherhithe
- Launched: 1 October 1792
- Fate: Sold 1807 for breaking up

General characteristics
- Type: East Indiaman
- Tons burthen: 1234, 1252, or 125410/94 (bm)
- Length: Overall:164 ft 4 in (50.1 m); Keel:132 ft 7 1/4 in (40.4 m)
- Beam: 42 ft 2 in (12.9 m)
- Depth of hold: 17 ft 0 in (5.2 m)
- Sail plan: Full-rigged ship
- Complement: 1795:135; 1804:135
- Armament: 1795:28 × 18&12-pounder guns + 6 × 18-pounder carronades; 1804:28 × 18&12-pounder guns + 6 × 18-pounder carronades
- Notes: Three decks

Bombay Castle was launched in 1792, as an East Indiaman. She made six voyages for the British East India Company (EIC) before she was sold in 1807, for breaking up. In addition to carrying cargo for the EIC, she transported troops in one campaign, participated in a naval action in which she helped capture a French frigate, and played a leading role in an encounter between the French Navy and a fleet of East Indiamen in which the East Indiamen succeeded in bluffing the French to withdraw.

== Career ==
=== EIC voyage #1 (1793–1794) ===
Captain Alexander Montgomerie sailed from The Downs on 14 January 1793, bound for Bombay and China. Bombay Castle was at Madeira on 6 February, and reached Bombay on 14 May. She was at Malacca on 22 August, and arrived at Whampoa anchorage on 12 September. Homeward bound, she crossed the Second Bar on 6 November, and reached St Helena on 11 April 1794. She was at Galway on 19 July, and arrived at Long Reach on 31 August.

=== EIC voyage #2 (1795–1797) ===
War with France had commenced shortly after Bombay Castle had left on her first voyage. Captain John Hamilton acquired a letter of marque on 26 February 1795. He sailed Bombay Castle for Bombay and China. She was part of a convoy of Indiamen that were bringing General Alured Clarke and his troops for the invasion of the Cape Colony.

The fleet rendezvoused at St Salvadore.

Bombay Castle sailed on 13 July, together with the other Indiamen, and under the escort of Sphinx. However, Sphinx ran into Warren Hastings and both vessels returned to port, Exeter accompanying them.

Bombay Castle and the fleet reached the Cape of Good Hope on 3 September.

After her service at the Cape was over, Bombay Castle resumed her voyage and reached Bombay on 4 January 1796. She visited Calicut 29 January, and Colombo on 12 February, before returning to Bombay on 21 March. She then sailed for China, reaching Malacca on 16 June, and arriving at Whampoa on 6 July. Homeward bound, she crossed the Second Bar on 12 November, and was at Macao on 2 January 1797. She was at Penang on 27 January, the Cape on 4 April, and St Helena on 28 April. She arrived at Long Reach on 28 July.

In March 1806, the commander, officers, and crew of Bombay Castle shared in the award of prize money for the capture on 16 September 1795, of the Cape, and the capture on 16 February 1796, of Colombo.

=== EIC voyage #3 (1798–1799) ===
Captain Hamilton sailed from Portsmouth on 17 February 1798, bound for Bombay and China. Bombay Castle reached Bombay on 4 June and arrived at Whampoa on 15 October. She crossed the Second Bar on 4 January 1799, was at Malacca on 22 February, reached St Helena on 17 May, and arrived at Long Reach 1 August.

=== EIC voyage #4 (1800–1801) ===
Captain John Hamilton sailed from Torbay on 27 May 1800, bound for China. Bombay Castle was part of a convoy that also included Exeter, Dorsetshire, Coutts, and Neptune, the Botany Bay ships Royal Admiral and Anne, and the whaler Seringapatam. Their escort was the small ship of the line HMS Belliqueux. On the morning of 4 August they encountered French squadron consisting of the frigates Concorde, Médée, and Franchise. The French commander was concerned that he had encountered a fleet of powerful warships so he turned to escape. The British commander, Captain Rowley Bulteel, immediately ordered a pursuit. To preserve the impression of warships he also ordered four of his most powerful East Indiamen to join the chase. First Belliqueux captured Concorde. Exeter and Bombay Castle set out after Médée and succeeded in coming up with her after dark and tricking her into surrendering to what Médée thought was a ship of the line.

Belliqueux and the Indiamen reached Rio de Janeiro on 12 August. They sailed on to the Cape, which they reached on 23 December. They sailed to China via the Pacific. On 21 January 1801, they touched at Merir. There four tattooed natives came out to trade, but the British could not persuade the natives to come on Neptune's deck. The British reached Whampoa on 23 February. Homeward bound, Bombay Castle crossed the Second Bar on 30 March, reached St Helena on 21 September, and arrived at Long Reach on 8 December.

=== EIC voyage #5 (1802–1804) ===
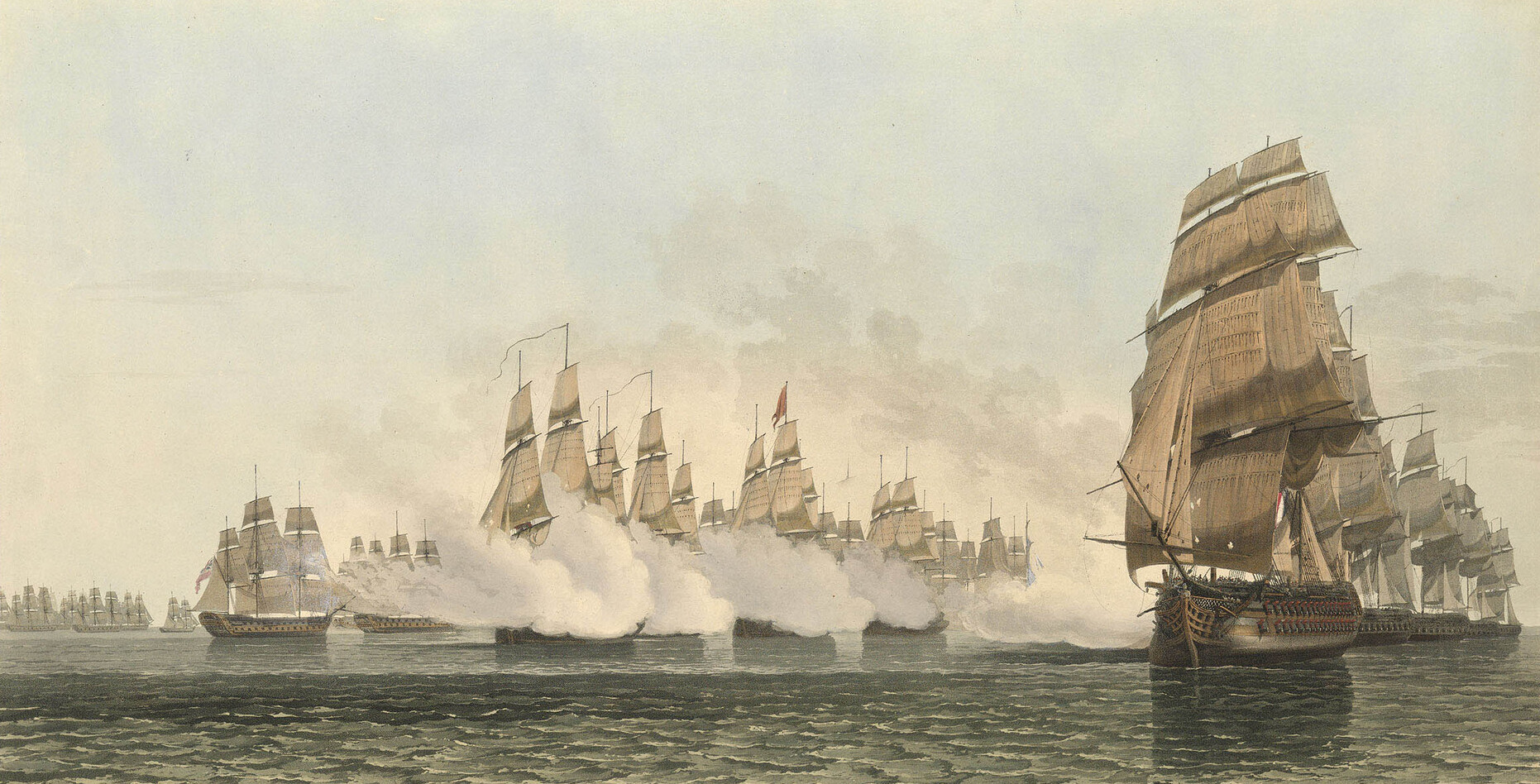
Defeat of Adml. Linois by Commodore Dance, Feby. 15th. 1804, by William Daniel

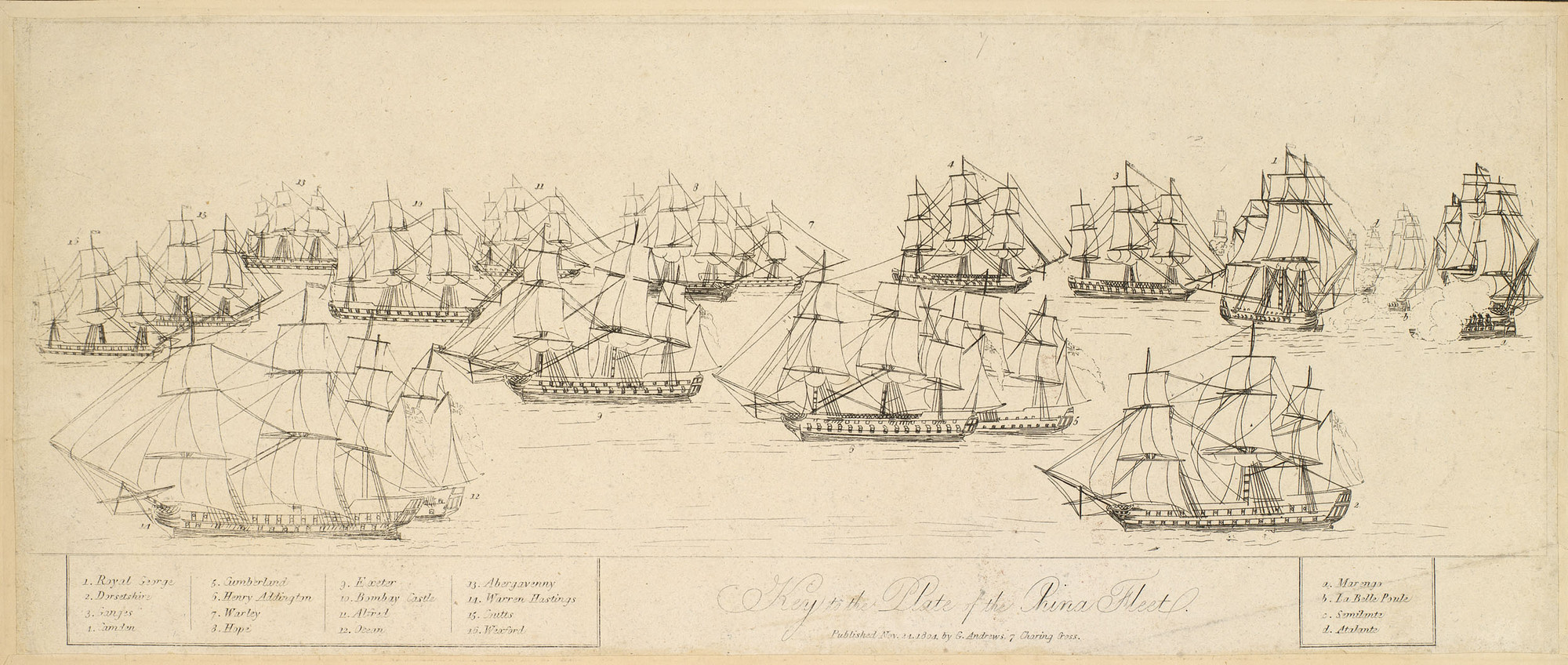
Bombay Castle can be seen in this printed key for a view of the Battle, showing the China Fleet a painting by Francis Sartorius, the younger after a drawing by an officer on board the Henry Addington

Captain Archibald Hamilton sailed from The Downs on 23 December 1802, bound for Bombay and China. Bombay Castle reached Bombay on 30 May 1803. She was at Malacca on 28 August, and arrived at Whampoa on 1 October. Homeward bound, Bombay Castle crossed the Second Bar on 23 December. She was part of a convoy of returning East Indiamen and other vessels, all under the command of Captain Nathaniel Dance. The Royal Navy was unable to provide an escort and the captains of the EIC's China Fleet debated about setting out for home. Still, the China Fleet crossed the Second Bar on 31 January 1804, and left China on 6 February. As they were passing through the Straits of Malacca on 14 February, they encountered a French squadron under Rear-Admiral the Comte de Linois, who hoped to seize as many of them as he could.

Dance sent the brig Ganges and three Indiamen, one of them Bombay Castle, to approach the strange vessels and investigate. It quickly became clear that the strange vessels were enemy warships. Dance ordered his fleet to form a line of battle, while creating a bluff that four of his Indiamen were a squadron of ships of the line escorting the convoy. A skirmish ensued with the result that Linois, somewhat inexplicably, withdrew.

On 18 February, the Indiamen were at Malacca. On 28 February, the British ships of the line HMS Sceptre and Albion joined the Fleet in the Strait and conducted them safely to St Helena. Bombay Castle was at Penang on 1 March. She reached St Helena on 9 June and arrived at Gravesend on 16 August. On the fleet's safe return, the EIC voted rewards to all the officers and seamen involved in the battle. The 12 captains whose vessels did not engage in combat, including Hamilton, each received a reward of 500 guineas and a piece of plate worth 50 guineas. The Lloyd's Patriotic Fund gave each captain a sword worth 50 guineas, and one worth 100 guineas to Captain Nathaniel Dance, who had been the commodore of the fleet. Dance refused a baronetcy but was subsequently knighted.

=== EIC voyage #6 (1805–1806) ===
Captain Archibald Hamilton acquired a letter of marque on 17 December 1804. Bombay Castle left from Portsmouth on 1 February 1805, bound for Bengal and China. She sailed with four other Indiamen and two whalers. The four Indiamen were Royal George, Henry Addington, Wexford, and Earl of Abergavenny. HMS Weymouth, herself a former merchantman, provided the naval escort. No sooner had they sailed than bad weather set in and on 5 February, the fleet made for Portland Roads, some 10 leagues away. As they did so, Earl of Abergavenny struck on the Shambles off the Isle of Portland and then sank in Weymouth Bay with the loss of 263 lives, including her captain, out of 402 people on board.

Hamilton sailed from Portsmouth again on 17 February, bound for Bombay and China. Bombay Castle reached Bombay on 21 June. She was at Penang on 25 September, Malacca on 10 October, and arrived at Whampoa on 27 December. Homeward bound, she left Whampoa on 1 March 1806, reached St Helena on 2 July, and arrived at Long Reach on 6 September.

== Fate ==
Bombay Castle was sold in 1807, for breaking up.

== See also ==
- Bombay Castle (South China Sea)
