= List of ship launches in 1835 =

The list of ship launches in 1835 includes a chronological list of some ships launched in 1835.

Date	Ship	Class	Builder	Location	Country	Notes
12 January	The Edgecombe	Brig	J. W. Tucker	Canons Marsh	United Kingdom	For private owner.
13 January	Frisk	Brig	Henry Barrick	Whitby	United Kingdom	For Messrs. Chapman & Willis.
30 January	Alexander Johnstone	Barque		Dumbarton	United Kingdom	For Mr. McLarty.
30 January	Felicity	Barque	Mueris & Clarke		United Kingdom	For private owner.
31 January	John Bull	Steamship	Fletcher & Fearnall	Limehouse	United Kingdom	For General Steam Navigation Company.
31 January	Tory	Full-rigged ship		Liverpool	United Kingdom	For Duncan Gibb.
January	Belize	Snow		Sunderland	United Kingdom	For J. Swain.
January	Duchess of Kent	Barque	George Frater & Co.	Sunderland	United Kingdom	For Andrew White.
1 February	Susannah Collings	Schooner	Humble & Milcrest	Liverpool	United Kingdom	For private owner.
3 February	Aberdeen	Steamship	John Scott & Sons	Greenock	United Kingdom	For London and Aberdeen Steamship Company.
14 February	Consort	Brig	Miller & Co.	Hull	United Kingdom	For private owner.
14 February	Hercules	Steamship	Mottershead & Heyes	Liverpool	United Kingdom	For St George Steam Packet Company.
16 February	City of Glasgow	Paddle Steamer	J. Wood	Port Glasgow	United Kingdom	For City of Glasgow Steam Packet Company.
18 February	Arab	Steamship	Wood & Mills	Bowling	United Kingdom	For private owner.
February	Africa	Barque	Byres	Sunderland	United Kingdom	For A. & R. White.
February	Asia	Barque	John M. Gales	Sunderland	United Kingdom	For A. & R. White.
February	Fero	Merchantman	John M. Gales	Sunderland	United Kingdom	For John Robinson.
February	Isabella Penman	Snow	Kirkbridge	Sunderland	United Kingdom	For Penman & Co.
February	Louisa Munro	Barque	Tiffin	Sunderland	United Kingdom	For J. C. Munro.
4 March	Falcon	Steamship	Hunter & Dow	Glasgow	United Kingdom	For private owner.
5 March	Railway	Steamship	Gutteridge	Selby	United Kingdom	For James Andus.
9 March	Heber	Merchantman	R. Campion & Co.	Whitby	United Kingdom	For private owner.
14 March	Delhi	Merchantman	Henry Barrick	Whitby	United Kingdom	For private owner.
14 March	Majestic	Full-rigged ship	H. & G. Barrick	Whitby	United Kingdom	For private owner.
30 March	Especulador	Steamship	Seddon & Leadley	North Birkenhead	United Kingdom	For Rio Steam Company.
30 March	Nietheray	Steamship	Seddon & Leadley	North Birkenhead	United Kingdom	For Rio Steam Company.
30 March	Praiagrandense	Steamship	Seddon & Leadley	North Birkenhead	United Kingdom	For Rio Steam Company.
March	Dorothy	Snow	H. Dobbinson	Sunderland	United Kingdom	For J. Tully.
March	Eliza	Smack		Port Madoc	United Kingdom	For private owner.
March	Integrity	Snow	J. Storey	Sunderland	United Kingdom	For J. Storey.
March	Tanjore	Barque		Hull	United Kingdom	For private owner.
8 April	Scotland	Merchantman		New York	United States	For private owner.
13 April	Ann Louisa	Snow	J. Carr	Southwick	United Kingdom	For W. Nicholson.
13 April	Commerce	Schooner	James Leithead	Sunderland	United Kingdom	For Clarence Shipping Co.
14 April	George William	Merchantman	William Potts	Sunderland	United Kingdom	For George Wood.
15 April	Eden	Merchantman	H. Dobbinson	Sunderland	United Kingdom	For E. Graham.
15 April	Jabez	Snow	James Leithead	Sunderland	United Kingdom	For Woods & Spence.
15 April	Robert Small	East Indiaman	Smith	Newcastle upon Tyne	United Kingdom	For private owner.
16 April	Orleans	Merchantman		Douglas	Isle of Man	For James Atkin.
16 April	Rosalind	Barque	W. Chilton	Sunderland	United Kingdom	For T. Blair.
23 April	Star	Alert-class brig-sloop		Woolwich Dockyard	United Kingdom	For Royal Navy.
28 April	Cleopatra	Vestal-class frigate		Pembroke Dockyard	United Kingdom	For Royal Navy.
30 April	Duke of Sussex	Steamship	Evans	Rotherhithe	United Kingdom	For Commercial Steam Packet Company.
30 April	Mountaineer	Steamboat		Bristol	United Kingdom	For private owner.
9 May	Beaver	Paddle steamer	Wigram & Green	Blackwall Yard	United Kingdom	For Hudson's Bay Company.
14 May	Hindoo	Merchantman	Charles Connell and Company	Glasgow	United Kingdom	For Messrs. Sinclaire & Boyd, John & Thomas Sinclaire, and J. Macnamara & Co.
15 May	Baku	Brig	S. G. Bebikhov	Astrakhan	Russia	For Russian Navy.
15 May	Napoleon	full-rigged ship	Thomas Oliver	Quebec	(United Kingdom of Great Britain and Ireland) Upper Canada	For G. H. Parke.
20 May	Countess of Galloway	Steamship	Wood & Mills	Liverpool	United Kingdom	For private owner.
20 May	Lady Acland	Merchantman	Stapleton	Bude	United Kingdom	For Mr. Davey.
23 May	Esquimaux	Merchantman	William Perkins	Newport	United Kingdom	For Hudson's Bay Company.
26 May	Smales	Brig	G. & H. Barrick	Whitby	United Kingdom	For Mr. Smales.
29 May	Royal Victoria	Yawl	Jarmany & Mack	Great Yarmouth	United Kingdom	For private owner.
May	Eliza	Barque		Chepstow	United Kingdom	For private owner.
11 June	Circassian	Brig	William Duthie	Aberdeen	United Kingdom	For private owner.
13 June	Mary Dugdale	Full-rigged ship	Thomas Humphrety & Co.	Hull	United Kingdom	For Charles Worthington & Co.
13 June	Sultan	Schooner	Gent	Plymouth	United Kingdom	For private owner.
25 June	Camelion	Steam cutter	Inman	Lymington	United Kingdom	For Board of Customs.
26 June	Hermes	Hermes-class sloop		Portsmouth Dockyard	United Kingdom	For Royal Navy.
27 June	Vulcan	Barque	Garland & Horsburgh	Dundee	United Kingdom	For private owner.
29 June	William Darley	Steamship	E. Gibson	Hull	United Kingdom	For Hull Steam Packet Co.
June	Blackit	Brig	Kirkbride & partners	Sunderland	United Kingdom	For private owner.
June	Richibucto	Barque	John Jardin	Richibucto	(United Kingdom of Great Britain and Ireland) Colony of New Brunswick	For private owner.
8 July	Columbia	Barque	Green, Wigram & Green	Blackwall	United Kingdom	For Hudson's Bay Company.
9 July	Britannia	Steamship	Fletcher & Fearnall	Limehouse	United Kingdom	For General Steam Navigation Company.
10 July	Wanderer	Racer-class brig-sloop		Chatham Dockyard	United Kingdom	For Royal Navy.
11 July	Star	Steamship	Bristol Steam Packet Company	Hotwells	United Kingdom	For private owner.
27 July	Wellington	Pilot cutter	Graves	Sandgate	United Kingdom	For Dover pilots.
28 July	Lefort	Imperatritsa Aleksandra-class ship of the line		Saint Petersburg	Russia	For Imperial Russian Navy.
July	Fidelity	Schooner		Sunderland	United Kingdom	For Bigger & Co.
July	Hope	Schooner			United Kingdom	For private owner.
July	Ino	Schooner	John M. Gales	Sunderland	United Kingdom	For Clark & Co.
July	Morning Star	Snow	James Johnson	Sunderland	United Kingdom	For Mr. Thompson.
July	Vulcan	Steamship	White	Cowes	United Kingdom	For Board of Customs.
6 August	Water Witch	Paddle steamer	George Graham	Harwich	United Kingdom	For John Hayward.
12 August	Wanderer	Full-rigged ship	E. Gibson	Hull	United Kingdom	For private owner.
25 August	Vanguard	Vanguard-class ship of the line		Pembroke Dockyard	United Kingdom	For Royal Navy.
26 August	City of Limerick	Steamship	Wilson	Liverpool	United Kingdom	For Dublin Steam Packet Co.
23 September	Spider	Schooner		Chatham Dockyard	United Kingdom	For Royal Navy.
24 September	Devon	Lighter		Chatham Dockyard	United Kingdom	For Royal Navy.
27 September	Wilkins	Smack		Port Madoc	United Kingdom	For private owner.
September	Port Glasgow	Barque		Saint John's, Nova Scotia	(United Kingdom of Great Britain and Ireland) Colony of Nova Scotia	For private owner.
24 October	Jupiter	Steamship	John Scott & Sons	Greenock	United Kingdom	For St George Steam Packet Company.
October	Claret	Brig	W. & A. Adamson	Sunderland	United Kingdom	For Perkins & Co.
October	Palestine	Snow	H. Dobbisnon	Sunderland	United Kingdom	For Penman & Co.
7 November	Camillus	Barque	J. Mills	Monkwearmouth	United Kingdom	For J. Collingv.
7 November	Neptune	Ship of the line		Vlissingen	Netherlands	For Royal Netherlands Navy.
18 November	Morayshire	Barque	Laing & Simey	Sunderland	United Kingdom	For Masson & Co.
19 November	Border Chieftain	Merchantman	John Thomas Alcock and Chales Alcock	Sunderland	United Kingdom	For Mr. Collingwood.
19 November	Prince George	Barque	Frater & Co	Sunderland	United Kingdom	For Panton & Son.
19 November	Thornley	Merchantman	T. Ogden	Sunderland	United Kingdom	For Messrs. Nesbit & Parkin.
21 November	Athlone	Steamship	Wilson	Liverpool	United Kingdom	For City of Dublin Steam Packet Company.
November	Mercury	Steamship	John Wood	Port Glasgow	United Kingdom	For private owner.
November	Royal Tar	Steamship	William and Isaac Olive	Carleton	(United Kingdom of Great Britain and Ireland) Colony of New Brunswick	For John Hammond, Daniel McLaughlin and Mackay Brothers & Co.
5 December	Pegasus	Paddle steamer	Robert Barclay & Co.	Glasgow	United Kingdom	For Hull and Leith Steam Packet Company.
9 December	Vivid	Steamship	Curling, Young & Co.	London	United Kingdom	For Humber Union Steam Company.
12 December	Pegasus	Paddle steamer	R. Barclay & Co.	Greencok	United Kingdom	For private owner.
19 December	Viscount Melbourne	Barque	James Edwards	South Shields	United Kingdom	For Mr. Marjoribanks.
19 December	Water Witch	Steamship	Curling, Young & Co	London	United Kingdom	For Humber Union Steam Company.
Unknown date	Abbotsford	Full-rigged ship	S. & P. Mills	Sunderland	United Kingdom	For Mr. Taylorson.
Unknown date	Admiral Roshnoff	Merchantman		Sunderland	United Kingdom	For Mr. Taylorson.
Unknown date	Advocate	Barque	J. Storey	Sunderland	United Kingdom	For Stanes & Co.
Unknown date	Allendale	Barque	Alcock	Sunderland	United Kingdom	For J. Alcock.
Unknown date	Aratus	Merchantman	H. Dobbinson	Sunderland	United Kingdom	For Buckingham & Son.
Unknown date	Berengaria	Barque		Sunderland	United Kingdom	For private owner.
Unknown date	Berzelius	Merchantman	Joseph Helmsley	Sunderland	United Kingdom	For Vint & Co.
Unknown date	Black Boy	Brig		Sunderland	United Kingdom	For private owner.
Unknown date	Bombay	Schooner		Bombay	India	For private owner.
Unknown date	Burrells	Schooner		Sunderland	United Kingdom	For Mr. Burrell.
Unknown date	Cardiva	Cutter		Bombay	India	For British East India Company.
Unknown date	Champion	Barque	W. Byers	Sunderland	United Kingdom	For W. Byers.
Unknown date	Croft	Schooner	Bowman and Drummond	Blyth	United Kingdom	For Mr. Bowman.
Unknown date	Cynosure	Barque	James Leithead	Sunderland	United Kingdom	For Hay & Son.
Unknown date	Derwent	Merchantman	Laing & Simey	Sunderland	United Kingdom	For Heish & Co.
Unknown date	Diamond	Merchantman			Isle of Man	For private owner.
Unknown date	Earl Grey	Merchantman		Newcastle upon Tyne	United Kingdom	For private owner.
Unknown date	Elizabeth Huddleston	Merchantman	J. Huddleston	Sunderland	United Kingdom	For private owner.
Unknown date	Emmanuel	Barque	James Leithead	Sunderland	United Kingdom	For E. Taylor.
Unknown date	Fly	Paddle steamer	Maudslay & Field	Lambeth	United Kingdom	For private owner.
Unknown date	Gem	Merchantman	Peter Austin	Sunderland	United Kingdom	For George Hudson.
Unknown date	George Collier	Steamboat			United States	For private owner.
Unknown date	Glenalva	Schooner	Halls	Monkwearmouth	United Kingdom	For Banff & London Shipping Co.
Unknown date	Hebe	Merchantman	W. Adamson	Sunderland	United Kingdom	For G. Shotton.
Unknown date	Henry Roop	Schooner		Black Rock, New York	United States	For private owner.
Unknown date	Jamesons	Snow	J. Storey	Monkwearmouth	United Kingdom	For J. Jameson.
Unknown date	Janet Willis	Barque	William Gales	Sunderland	United Kingdom	For Willis & Co.
Unknown date	Lady Grant	Brig		Bombay	India	For private owner.
Unknown date	Laura	Steamboat		Louisville, Kentucky	United States	For private owner.
Unknown date	Lexington	Paddle steamer			United States	For Cornelius Vanderbilt.
Unknown date	Lord Canterbury	Barque		Quebec	(United Kingdom of Great Britain and Ireland) Upper Canada	For private owner.
Unknown date	Lucinda	Whaler		Great Yarmouth	United Kingdom	For John Wilson & Co.
Unknown date	Maida	Snow		Deptford	United Kingdom	For B. Walker.
Unknown date	Maldiva	Cutter		Bombay	India	For British East India Company.
Unknown date	Manchester	Merchantman		Portland	(United Kingdom of Great Britain and Ireland) Colony of New Brunswick	For private owner.
Unknown date	Mantura	Schooner	John Ball Jr.	Salcombe	United Kingdom	For Henry Grant & others.
Unknown date	Margaret	Cutter		Bombay	India	For British East India Company.
Unknown date	Margarita	Barque	Bowman and Drummond	Blyth	United Kingdom	For Watson & Co.
Unknown date	Marina	Snow	Peter Austin	Sunderland	United Kingdom	For Austin & Co.
Unknown date	Marwood	Snow		Sunderland	United Kingdom	For Mr. Marwood.
Unknown date	May Flower	Fishing smack	Bell & Grant	Grimsby	United Kingdom	For R. Keetley.
Unknown date	Melona	Snow	Joseph Helmsley	Southwick	United Kingdom	For Mr. Smallwood.
Unknown date	Merwede	Full-rigged ship		Dordrecht	Netherlands	For Royal Netherlands Navy.
Unknown date	Monica	Snow	W. H. Person	Sunderland	United Kingdom	For T. Gibson.
Unknown date	Mootnee	River craft		Bombay	India	For British East India Company.
Unknown date	Nausery	Brig		Bombay	India	For an Imaum.
Unknown date	Nerbudda	Cutter		Bombay Dockyard	India	For British East India Company.
Unknown date	Normandie	Paddle steamer	Lemornand	Havre de Grâce	France	For Compagnie des Paquetbots à Vapeur sur la Seine.
Unknown date	Orator	Merchantman	Peter Austin	Sunderland	United Kingdom	For John Allan.
Unknown date	Pensher	Merchantman	John M. Gales	Sunderland	United Kingdom	For M. Elliott.
Unknown date	Phoenix	Schooner	William Bonker	Salcombe	United Kingdom	For Robert Hurrell and others.
Unknown date	Pilot	Merchantman	Laing & Simey	Sunderland	United Kingdom	For R. Pearson.
Unknown date	Princess Victoria	Snow	Frater & Co	Sunderland	United Kingdom	For H. Panton.
Unknown date	Ring-dove	Snow	William Potts	Sunderland	United Kingdom	For William Potts.
Unknown date	Saladin	Barque	A. & R. Hopper & Co.	Newcastle upon Tyne	United Kingdom	For private owner.
Unknown date	Sir Herbert Compton	Full-rigged ship		Bombay	India	For private owner.
Unknown date	Taptee	Brig		Bombay	India	Pilot vessel for British East India Company.
Unknown date	Thomas	Schooner		Sunderland	United Kingdom	For Murphy & Co.
Unknown date	Water Lily	Schooner	John Ball Jr.	Salcombe	United Kingdom	For John A. Cuthbertson & Thomas Fox.
Unknown date	Water Witch	Cutter	John Gray	Hobart Town	(United Kingdom of Great Britain and Ireland) Van Diemen's Land	For George Watson and James Smith.
