= List of ship launches in 1837 =

The list of ship launches in 1837 includes a chronological list of some ships launched in 1837.

Date	Ship	Class	Builder	Location	Country	Notes
4 January	Krishna	Brig		Bombay	India	For Bombay Pilot Service.
4 January	Swallow	Sloop	William Bayley	Ipswich	United Kingdom	For Mr. Garrod.
7 January	Tintern	Merchantman	Messrs. Swift	Brockweir	United Kingdom	For private owner.
19 January	Neptune	Steamship	Green & Wigram	location	United Kingdom	For General Steam Navigation Company.
24 January	Whitby	Full-rigged ship	George & Henry Barrick	Whitby	United Kingdom	For John Chapman & Co.
January	Anna Maria	Full-rigged ship		Calcutta	India	For private owner.
January	Reina Maria Cristina	Frigate		Ferrol	Spain	For Spanish Navy.
3 February	Sappho	Racer-class brig-sloop		Devonport Dockyard	United Kingdom	For Royal Navy.
4 February	Vesta	Steamship	Messrs. Hooper's	Ouseburn	United Kingdom	For Newcastle Steam Navigation Company.
7 February	Amelia	Barque	John Young	Newport	United Kingdom	For private owner.
7 February	Mercury	Cutter		Chatham Dockyard	United Kingdom	For Royal Navy.
7 February	Pomona	Merchantman	Butement & Young	North Leith	United Kingdom	For private owner.
23 February	City of London	Chinaman	Messrs. L. Rose & Son	Leith	United Kingdom	For private owner.
February	Isabella & Louisa	Snow	G. Johnson, or G. Johnson, N. Davies and T. Davies	Sunderland	United Kingdom	For J. Ritson.
7 March	Fair Trader	Smack	William Jones	Port Madoc	United Kingdom	For private owner.
8 March	City of Kingston	Steamship	Wallis	Blackwall, London	United Kingdom	For Jamaica Steam Navigation Company.
8 March	Eagle	Schooner	William Jones	Port Madoc	United Kingdom	For private owner.
8 March	Warrior	East Indiaman	Messrs. Garland & Horsbrugh	Dundee	United Kingdom	For Mr. Blain.
11 March	Independence	Schooner	Jabez & Edward F. Williams	Greenpoint, New York	United States	For private owner.
25 March	Margaret	Brig	Bally	Shoreham-by-Sea	United Kingdom	For private owner.
27 March	Woodbury	Revenue cutter	L. H. Duncan	Baltimore, Maryland	United States	For United States Revenue Cutter Service.
March	Lawsons	Merchantman	William Gales	Sunderland	United Kingdom	For Lawson & Co.
6 April	Leith	Steamship	Messrs. Menzies	Leith	United Kingdom	For General Steam Navigation Company.
7 April	Era	Schooner	John Ball Jr.	Salcombe	United Kingdom	For William Beer and others.
8 April	Montrose	Steamship	John Scott & Sons	Greenock	United Kingdom	For private owner.
8 April	Seringapatam	Passenger ship	Green, Wigram & Green	Blackwall	United Kingdom	For private owner.
14 April	Mangishlak	Mangishlak-class brig	S. G. Bebikhov	Astrakhan	Russia	For Imperial Russian Navy.
19 April	Eagle	Paddle steamer	Fletcher & Fearnall	Limehouse	United Kingdom	For Eagle Steam Packet Company.
19 April	Falcon	Paddle steamer	Fletcher & Fearnall	Blackwall	United Kingdom	For Eagle Steam Packet Company.
20 April	Embuscade	Ariane-class corvette		Saint-Malo	France	For Royal Navy.
20 April	Orwell	Sloop	Messrs. Read & Pahe	Ipswich	United Kingdom	For private owner.
21 April	Hazard	Favorite-class sloop		Portsmouth Dockyard	United Kingdom	For Royal Navy.
22 April	Chester Trader	Smack	Parry	Hirnel	United Kingdom	For private owner.
April	Aimwell	Snow	Kirkbride & Carruthers	Sunderland	United Kingdom	For General Shipping Company.
April	Ann Elliot	Snow	J. Carr	Sunderland	United Kingdom	For M. Elliot.
April	Horsford	Brigantine		Belfast	United Kingdom	For private owner.
April	Messenger	Snow	G. Frater & Co	Sunderland	United Kingdom	For Mr. Thompson.
April	Olive Branch	Barque	J. Watson	Sunderland	United Kingdom	For Mr. Greenwell.
5 May	Magnet	Sloop	James Crave	Wakefield	United Kingdom	For Messrs. R. Dunn & Co.
6 May	L'Egyptien	Steam yacht	Laird & Co.	Birkenhead	United Kingdom	For Pacha of Egypt.
18 May	Fulton	Paddle steamer		Brooklyn Navy Yard	United States	For United States Navy.
18 May	Ocean Bride	Snow	Reed, Denton & Co	Sunderland	United Kingdom	For Gales & Co.
20 May	Helen	Brig	William Gibson	Hull	United Kingdom	For Messrs. Priest & Lambert.
20 May	Touvre	Transport ship	Arsenal de Rochefort	Rochefort	France	For French Navy.
22 May	Royal Victoria	Steamship	W. & T. Wilson	Liverpool	United Kingdom	For Carlisle, Annan and Liverpool Steam Navigation Company.
22 May	William Wilberforce	Steamship	Messrs. Curling, Young & Co.	Limehouse	United Kingdom	For Humber Union Steam Company.
30 May	Clifton	Merchantman	Green	Bristol	United Kingdom	For private owner.
May	Cornelius	Merchantman	W. Potts	Sunderland	United Kingdom	For W. Potts.
May	Emerald	Merchantman	Peter Austin & Sons	Sunderland	United Kingdom	For Peter Austin & Sons.
May	Houghton-le-Spring	Barque	Dixon	Sunderland	United Kingdom	For R. Brown.
May	Sarepta	Snow	Kirkbride & partners	Sunderland	United Kingdom	For Mr. Nicholson.
6 June	Hercules	Steamship	Bauckham	Gravesend	United Kingdom	For Llanelly Railway and Dock Company.
6 June	Josepha	Barque		Quebec	(United Kingdom of Great Britain and Ireland) Upper Canada	For private owner.
19 June	Mandane	Barque	Laing & Simey	Sunderland	United Kingdom	For Mr. Wilkinson.
19 June	Victoria	Paddle Steamer	Medley, or Messrs. Brownlow, Pearson & Co.	River Humber, or Hull	United Kingdom	For Hull Steam Packet Company
20 June	Bonnie Dundee	Steamship	Adamson	Dundee	United Kingdom	For Leith Steam Packet Company.
20 June	Samuel	Barque	W. J. & R. Tindall	Scarborough	United Kingdom	For Samuel Smith.
24 June	England	Full-rigged ship		Tynemouth	(United Kingdom of Great Britain and Ireland) Colony of New Brunswick	For private owner.
June	Sir Lionel Smith	Steamship		Blackwall	United Kingdom	For private owner.
June	Grove	Merchantman	John M. Gales	Sunderland	United Kingdom	For private owner.
6 July	Queen Victoria	Paddle steamer	Charles Connell and Company	Scotstoun	United Kingdom	For Down and Liverpool Company.
18 July	Pennsylvania	Chippewa-class ship of the line		Philadelphia Naval Shipyard	United States	For United States Navy.
19 July	Great Western	Paddle steamer	Patterson & Mercer	Bristol	United Kingdom	For Great Western Steamship Company.
19 July	Thalali	Royal barge		London	United Kingdom	For Queen Victoria.
19 July	Tiger	Paddle steamer	Edward Gibson & Son	Hull	United Kingdom	For St George Steam Packet Company.
July	Brown	Merchantman	T. Rowntree	Sunderland	United Kingdom	For T. Brown.
July	Hannah	Snow	W. Chilton	Sunderland	United Kingdom	For Ranson & Co.
July	John George	Barque	James Leithead	Southwick	United Kingdom	For John Abbott & Co.
July	Queen Victoria	Snow	J. Mills, or J. & G. Mills	Sunderland	United Kingdom	For Mr. Thompson.
5 August	The Hannah	Schooner		Wells-next-the-Sea	United Kingdom	For Joseph Fletcher.
16 August	Thetis	Brig	Gutteridge	Selby	United Kingdom	For Messrs. Standering & Co.
17 August	Megaera	Hermes-class sloop		Sheerness Dockyard	United Kingdom	For Royal Navy.
19 August	Queen Victoria	Steamship	Messrs. Wilson	Liverpool	United Kingdom	For City of Dublin Steam Packet Company.
31 August	Gorgon	Paddle sloop	Sir William Symonds	Pembroke Dockyard	United Kingdom	For Royal Navy.
August	Judith Milbanke	Merchantman	S. &. P. Mills	Sunderland	United Kingdom	For private owner.
August	Luna	Merchantman	R. Reed	Sunderland	United Kingdom	For private owner.
2 September	Aid	Brig	R. & W. Campion	Whitby	United Kingdom	For private owner.
2 September	Fanny	Barque	Messrs. Miller & Co	River Humber	United Kingdom	For Messrs. Andres & Co.
9 September	James Avery	Pilot boat	David Brown & Jacob Bell	New York	United States	For private owners.
12 September	Widgeon	Paddle steamer		Chatham Dockyard	United Kingdom	For Royal Navy.
14 September	The New Ebor	Steamship	Messrs. Smith & Son	Gainsborough	United Kingdom	For York Steam Packet Company.
16 September	Antwerpen	Steamship		Antwerp	Belgium	For private owner.
25 September	Cambria	Merchantman		Pembroke Dockyard	United Kingdom	For private owner.
26 September	Sirius	Steamship	Messrs. Fairbairne's	Isle of Dogs	United Kingdom	For private owner.
28 September	Electra	Comet-class ship-sloop		Portsmouth Dockyard	United Kingdom	For Royal Navy.
28 September	Lily	Racer-class brig-sloop		Pembroke Dockyard	United Kingdom	For Royal Navy.
30 September	China	Full-rigged ship	Messrs. Humphrey & Co.	Hull	United Kingdom	For private owner.
30 September	Mona	Sloop	Edward Ellis	Garth	United Kingdom	For private owners.
30 September	William & Elizabeth	Barque			Colony of Prince Edward Island	For private owner.
2 October	Forth	Merchantman	Muris & Clarke	Glasgow	United Kingdom	For private owner.
2 October	Ivanhoe	Brig	R. Atkinson	Goole	United Kingdom	For Messrs. William Hudson & Co.
5 October	Calliope	Andromache-class frigate		Sheerness Dockyard	United Kingdom	For Royal Navy.
14 October	Liverpool	Paddle steamer	Humble & Milcrest	Liverpool	United Kingdom	For Sir John Tobin.
14 October	Rainbow	Paddle steamer	John Laird	Birkenhead	United Kingdom	For General Steam Navigation Company.
16 October	Guave	West Indiaman	Messrs. Menzies & Sons	Leith	United Kingdom	For private owner.
16 October	The Lady Bulkeley	Sloop		Beaumaris	United Kingdom	For private owner.
17 October	Queen Victoria	Full-rigged ship	Messrs. Humphrey & Co.	Hull	United Kingdom	For private owner.
19 October	Hercules	Dredger	Adams	Grangemouth	United Kingdom	For private owner.
23 October	Vola	Imperatritsa Aleksandra-class ship of the line		New Admiralty Shipyard, Saint Petersburg	Russia	For Imperial Russian Navy.
31 October	Modeste	Modeste-class corvette		Woolwich Dockyard	United Kingdom	For Royal Navy.
October	Medway	Steamship			United Kingdom	For private owner.
October	Miriam	Snow	H. Dobbinson	Sunderland	United Kingdom	For Penman & Co.
October	Newburn	Brig		North Biddick	United Kingdom	For private owner.
October	Ocean	Merhantman	J. Crown	Sunderland	United Kingdom	For Mr. Richardson.
1 November	Chieftain	Barque	Messrs. A. McFarlane & Co.	Dumbarton	United Kingdom	For D M'Larty.
11 November	William Skinner	Merchantman	William Hey Mellanby	Newcastle upon Tyne	United Kingdom	For General Shipping Company.
22 November	Harlequin	Full-rigged ship	Isaac Preston	Southtown	United Kingdom	For private owner.
1 December	Falcon	Barque	John Wood	Port Glasgow	United Kingdom	For private owner.
2 December	Cyane	Cyane-class sloop		Boston Navy Yard	United States	For United States Navy.
12 December	Gloire	Frigate		Rochefort	France	For French Navy.
14 December	Voador	Steamship	John Laird & Sons	North Birkenhead	United Kingdom	For private owner.
16 December	Konstantin	Ferzhampenuaz-class ship of the line		Saint Petersburg	Russia	For Imperial Russian Navy.
28 December	Levant	Cyane-class sloop		New York Navy Yard	United States	For United States Navy.
30 December	Jamaica	Full-rigged ship	Clarke & Sons	Liverpool	United Kingdom	For Joseph Brookes Yates.
December	Albatross	Snow	G. Johnson, N. Davies and T. Davies	Sunderland	United Kingdom	For private owner.
December	Betsey & Ann	Schooner		Ipswich	United Kingdom	For private owner.
December	Cleopatra	Barque		Southwick	United Kingdom	For Colling & Co.
December	Dasher	Paddle steamer		location	United Kingdom	For Royal Navy.
December	Wrestler	Schooner		Ipswich	United Kingdom	For private owner.
December	Water Witch	Schooner		Ipswich	United Kingdom	For W. May.
Unknown date	Addison Brown	Snow		Sunderland	United Kingdom	For Addison Brown.
Unknown date	Adrastrus	Merchantman	S. & P. Mills	Sunderland	United Kingdom	For private owner.
Unknown date	Agitator	Full-rigged ship		Quebec	(United Kingdom of Great Britain and Ireland) Upper Canada	For private owner.
Unknown date	Air	Merchantman	Laing & Simey	Sunderland	United Kingdom	For P. Laing.
Unknown date	Alderman Thompson	Brig	P. Wood	Sunderland	United Kingdom	For private owner.
Unknown date	Alnwick Packet	Schooner	Bowman and Drummond	Blyth	United Kingdom	For Mr. Hodgson.
Unknown date	Anthony Wayne	Paddle steamer	Samuel L. Hubbell	Perrysburg, Ohio	United States	For Perrysburgh & Miami Steam Boat Company.
Unknown date	Arab	Snow	T. Lanchester	Sunderland	United Kingdom	For private owner.
Unknown date	Atkin	Snow	G. Thompson	Sunderland	United Kingdom	For J. Atkin.
Unknown date	Bedlington	Schooner	Bowman and Drummond	Blyth	United Kingdom	For Burlison Heron, Edward Heron, James Heron and Michael Longridge.
Unknown date	Bengalee	Barque	Archibald P. MacFarlane Jr. & Co	Dumbarton	United Kingdom	For Hamlin & Co.
Unknown date	Braganza	Merchantman	Peter Austin	Sunderland	United Kingdom	For Gray & Co.
Unknown date	Dorothy	Snow	S. & P. Mills	Sunderland	United Kingdom	For Mr. Thompson.
Unknown date	Dryad	Brig	T. & J. Brocklebank	Whitehaven	United Kingdom	For Thomas & John Brocklebank.
Unknown date	Duchess of Kent	Schooner		River Wear	United Kingdom	For John Barry.
Unknown date	Elizabeth & Catherine	Snow	J. & G. Mills	Sunderland	United Kingdom	For Potts & Co.
Unknown date	Emma	Snow	Joseph Helmsley	Sunderland	United Kingdom	For Dunford & Co.
Unknown date	Flora	Schooner	H. Dobbinson	Sunderland	United Kingdom	For P. Welch.
Unknown date	Friendship	Snow	T. S. Dixon	Sunderland	United Kingdom	For Lamb & Co.
Unknown date	Gem	Merchantman	J. H. Robson	Sunderland	United Kingdom	For private owner.
Unknown date	George Welsford	Barque	J. Rodgerson	Sunderland	United Kingdom	For Mr. Welsford.
Unknown date	Gilbert Henderson	Merchantman	Laing & Simey	Sunderland	United Kingdom	For Mr. Henderson.
Unknown date	Glencoe	Snow	Peter Austin	Sunderland	United Kingdom	For John Campbell.
Unknown date	Hercules	Paddle Tug	George Banckham	Gravesend	United Kingdom	For Lanelly Railway & Dock Co.
Unknown date	Houghton-le-Skerne	Merchantman		Sunderland	United Kingdom	For private owner.
Unknown date	Indus	Snow		Monkwearmouth	United Kingdom	For Walker & Co.
Unknown date	Jane and Ann	Snow	H. Dobbinson	Sunderland	United Kingdom	For Mr. Hodgson.
Unknown date	John Botcherby	Merchantman		Sunderland	United Kingdom	For Mr. Botcherby.
Unknown date	John White	Snow		Sunderland	United Kingdom	For R. White.
Unknown date	Lord Mulgrave	Merchantman	Rowntree	Sunderland	United Kingdom	For Foster & Co.
Unknown date	Loyal Packet	Snow	R. & T. Andrews	Sunderland	United Kingdom	For M. Reed.
Unknown date	Madagascar	Blackwall frigate	Wigram & Green	Blackwall	United Kingdom	For George & Henry Green.
Unknown date	Margarets	Merchantman		Sunderland	United Kingdom	For private owner.
Unknown date	Mary	Brig	Bowman and Drummond	Blyth	United Kingdom	For John Common, David Miller and Isaac Richardson.
Unknown date	May	Snow	Joseph Helmsley	Sunderland	United Kingdom	For Mr. Middleton.
Unknown date	Neptune	Steamship		South Shields	United Kingdom	For Newcastle and Hull Steam Packet Company.
Unknown date	Maximilianos	Steamship		Poros	Greece	For Royal Hellenic Navy.
Unknown date	Nantucket	Whaler		Nantucket, Massachusetts	United States	For private owner.
Unknown date	New York	Paddle steamer			United States	For New York and Charleston Steam Packet Company.
Unknown date	Patelina	Schooner	William Bonker	Salcombe	United Kingdom	For Henry Grant and others.
Unknown date	Powhattan	Full-rigged ship		Baltimore, Maryland	United States	For W. Graham.
Unknown date	Prospect	Snow	J.& G. Mills	Sunderland	United Kingdom	For private owner.
Unknown date	Queen	Snow		Sunderland	United Kingdom	For private owner.
Unknown date	Rajastan	Full-rigged ship		Bombay	India	For private owner.
Unknown date	Ralph Wylam	Snow		Sunderland	United Kingdom	For Wylam & Co.
Unknown date	Rhoda	Merchantman	John Ball Jr.	Salcombe	United Kingdom	For John Matthews, Nicholas Smith and others.
Unknown date	Sarah	Schooner	T. & W. Dixon	Sunderland	United Kingdom	For Graham & Co.
Unknown date	Sarah	Schooner	James Leithead	Sunderland	United Kingdom	For Walford & Co.
Unknown date	Sirius	Paddle steamer	Robert Menzies & Sons	Leith	United Kingdom	For St George Steam Packet Company.
Unknown date	Sir John St. Aubyn	Steamship		Sunderland	United Kingdom	For private owner.
Unknown date	Standard	Sloop	William Brokenshaw	Fowey	United Kingdom	For George B. Brokenshaw.
Unknown date	Star	Schooner	George Worthy	Sunderland	United Kingdom	For Ord & Co.
Unknown date	Sylph	full-rigged ship		Rotterdam	Netherlands	For Royal Netherlands Navy.
Unknown date	Syren	Snow		Sunderland	United Kingdom	For private owner.
Unknown date	Tar	Schooner	J. Storey	Sunderland	United Kingdom	For J. Storey.
Unknown date	Tophill	Sloop			United Kingdom	For private owner.
Unknown date	Town of Wexford	Paddle steamer	Archer & Leared	Wexford	United Kingdom	For John Edward Redmond.
Unknown date	Tradesman	Merchantman	William Bayley & Sons	Ipswich	United Kingdom	For private owner.
Unknown date	Traveller	Merchantman	J. Naisby	Sunderland	United Kingdom	For Mr. Thompson.
Unknown date	Triumph	Brigantine	William Bayley	Ipswich	United Kingdom	For private owner.
Unknown date	Union	Smack		Peterhead	United Kingdom	For private owner.
Unknown date	Warwick	Merchantman		Sunderland	United Kingdom	For private owner.
Unknown date	William & Jane	Merchantman	George Thompson	Sunderland	United Kingdom	For Mr. Thompson.
Unknown date	Washington	Revenue cutter			United Kingdom	For United States Revenue Cutter Service.
Unknown date	William Gales	Barque	William Gales	Sunderland	United Kingdom	For Gales & Co.
Unknown date	William Thompson	Snow	W. Wilkinson	Sunderland	United Kingdom	For Hartlepool Ship Company.
Unknown date	Wilsons	Merchantman		Sunderland	United Kingdom	For private owner.
Unknown date	Young Queen	Snow	Rodham & Todd	Sunderland	United Kingdom	For private owner.
