= George Collier (disambiguation) =

George Collier (1732–1795) was a Royal Navy officer.

George Collier may also refer to:

- Sir George Collier, 1st Baronet (1774–1824), Royal Navy officer
- Wash Collier (George Washington Collier, 1813–1903), early settler in the Atlanta area
- George Collier (steamboat)

== See also ==
- Collier (disambiguation)
