= List of shipwrecks in August 1839 =

The list of shipwrecks in August 1839 includes ships sunk, foundered, wrecked, grounded, or otherwise lost during August 1839.

== 1 August ==
List of shipwrecks: 1 August 1839
Ship	State	Description
Louise Gallo	France	The ship ran aground off Dunkirk, Nord and was abandoned by her crew. She was on a voyage from Sunderland, County Durham to Nantes, Loire Atlantique. Louise Gallo was subsequently taken into Dunkirk in a sinking condition.
Pearl	United Kingdom	The ship was wrecked on Schouwen, Zeeland, Netherlands with the loss of all on board. She was on a voyage from Sunderland to a Dutch port.
William	United Kingdom	The sloop sank off The Crow, Pembrokeshire.

== 2 August ==
List of shipwrecks: 2 August 1839
Ship	State	Description
Manchester	United Kingdom	The barque, which had sprung a leak on 29 July, was abandoned in the Indian Ocean (1°47′N 84°40′E) by her 29 passengers and crew. Twenty of them reached Penang on 22 September. Thomas Coutts rescued the other nine (United Kingdom).

== 5 August ==
List of shipwrecks: 5 August 1839
Ship	State	Description
Betsey	United Kingdom	The ship ran aground on the North Bank, off the coast of Cumberland.
Cropton	United Kingdom	The ship was driven ashore near Wierum, Friesland, Netherlands with the loss of her captain. She was on a voyage from Newcastle upon Tyne, Northumberland to Hamburg.
Despatch	United Kingdom	The schooner foundered off Stoke Church, Devon with the loss of all hands.
George	United Kingdom	The ship ran aground off New Brighton, Cheshire. She was on a voyage from Quebec City, Lower Canada, British North America to Liverpool, Lancashire.
Raphael	France	The ship was driven ashore on Ameland, Friesland.
Vrow Margaretha	Hamburg	The ship was driven ashore on Ameland. She was on a voyage from Hamburg to Hull, Yorkshire, United Kingdom.

== 6 August ==
List of shipwrecks: 6 August 1839
Ship	State	Description
George	United Kingdom	The ship ran aground in the River Mersey at New Brighton, Cheshire.

== 7 August ==
List of shipwrecks: 7 August 1839
Ship	State	Description
Wilkinson	United Kingdom	The ship was driven ashore on the Perches. She was refloated and taken into Workington, Cumberland.

== 9 August ==
List of shipwrecks: 9 August 1839
Ship	State	Description
Jane	United Kingdom	The ship was driven ashore north of The Perches, on the coast of Cumberland.
Three Sisters	United Kingdom	The ship was run down and sunk in the North Sea off Dunwich, Suffolk with the loss of all hands. She was on a voyage from Cardiff, Glamorgan to Stockton-on-Tees, County Durham.

== 10 August ==
List of shipwrecks: 10 August 1839
Ship	State	Description
Archibald	United Kingdom	The schooner was driven ashore in Dundrum Bay. She was on a voyage from Belfast, County Antrim to Neath, Glamorgan.
Emily	United Kingdom	The ship foundered in Dundrum Bay with the loss of all hands.
Hinton	United Kingdom	The brig was holed by her anchor and sank at The Mumbles, Glamorgan.
Margaret Simpson	United Kingdom	The sloop was run down and sunk in the North Sea of the coast of County Durham by Leith (United Kingdom). Her crew were rescued. Margaret Simpson was on a voyage from South Shields, County Durham to Dundee, Forfarshire.
Medway	United Kingdom	The ship ran aground on the Barber Sand, in the North Sea off the coast of Norfolk. She was refloated.
Resolution	United Kingdom	The ship was driven ashore at Northam, Devon. Her crew were rescued. She was on a voyage from Cork to Newport, Monmouthshire.
Sabina	United Kingdom	The brig was wrecked on the Rabbina Shoal, in the Baltic Sea off Saaremaa, Russia. Her crew were rescued.
Standard	United Kingdom	The ship was wrecked near Cape Ray, Newfoundland, British North America with the loss of a crew member. She was on a voyage from Sunderland, County Durham to Quebec City, Lower Canada, British North America.

== 11 August ==
List of shipwrecks: 11 August 1839
Ship	State	Description
Friends	United Kingdom	The ship was driven ashore and wrecked west of Ilfracombe, Devon. Her crew were rescued.
Margaret	United Kingdom	The ship was driven ashore at Southport, Lancashire.

== 12 August ==
List of shipwrecks: 12 August 1839
Ship	State	Description
Bonny	United Kingdom	The ship ran aground on the Kentish Knock and was damaged. She was on a voyage from London to Saint Petersburg, Russia. Bonny was refloated the next day.
Dispatch	United Kingdom	The schooner was wrecked at Mothecombe, Devon with the loss of all hands. She was on a voyage from Salcombe to a Mediterranean port.
Friends	United Kingdom	The ship was driven ashore and wrecked west of Ilfracombe, Devon. Her crew were rescued.

== 13 August ==
List of shipwrecks: 13 August 1839
Ship	State	Description
Emily	United Kingdom	The ship foundered in Dundrum Bay with the loss of all hands.

== 14 August ==
List of shipwrecks: 14 August 1839
Ship	State	Description
Onondaga	United Kingdom	The barque was abandoned in the Atlantic Ocean. Her crew were rescued by Bolton (United Kingdom). Onondaga was driven ashore and wrecked at Cape Ray, Newfoundland, British North America on 13 September.
Thomas Halliburton	United Kingdom	The schooner was run down and sunk in the Irish Sea by Algonquin (United States). Her crew were rescued by Elizabeth (United Kingdom).

== 15 August ==
List of shipwrecks: 15 August 1839
Ship	State	Description
Dispatch	United Kingdom	The ship was holed by an anchor and sank at Padstow, Cornwall.
Dorchester	United Kingdom	The ship was driven ashore and damaged at Milford Haven, Pembrokeshire. She was on a voyage from Quebec City, Lower Canada, British North America to Bristol, Gloucestershire. Dorchester was refloated on 24 August and taken into Milford Haven.
Harmony	United Kingdom	The ship capsized at Newport, Monmouthshire and was severely damaged.
Possidone	Russia	The barque ran aground on the Long Sand, in the North Sea off the coast of Essex, United Kingdom. She was on a voyage from Antwerp, Belgium to Naples, Kingdom of the Two Sicilies. Possideone was refloated the next day with assistance from the smacks Good Agreement, Phœnix and Rumsley (all United Kingdom).

== 16 August ==
List of shipwrecks: 16 August 1839
Ship	State	Description
Mars	United Kingdom	The ship was wrecked on the Prata Shoal whilst on a voyage from Manila, Spanish East Indies to China. Some of the crew took to the only available boat and were subsequently rescued by Bombay Castle (United Kingdom), HMS Hyacinth (Royal Navy) was despatched to rescue the rest of her crew.
Rose	United Kingdom	The ship was driven ashore on Öland, Sweden. She was on a voyage from Riga, Russia to Bristol, Gloucestershire. Rose was refloated on 22 August and taken into Kalmar.
Standard	United Kingdom	The ship was lost near Cape Ray, Newfoundland with the loss of a crew member.

== 17 August ==
List of shipwrecks: 17 August 1839
Ship	State	Description
Belle	United Kingdom	The ship was driven ashore at Teignmouth, Devon. She was on a voyage from Teignmouth to Glasgow, Renfrewshire. She was refloated and resumed her voyage.
Brancepeth Castle	United Kingdom	The ship ran aground off Helsingør, Denmark. She was on a voyage from Saint Petersburg, Russia to London. She was later refloated and resumed her voyage.

== 18 August ==
List of shipwrecks: 18 August 1839
Ship	State	Description
Cadwallader	United Kingdom	The ship was abandoned in the Atlantic Ocean with the loss of two of her crew. she was on a voyage from St. Stephen, New Brunswick, British North America to Barbados.

== 19 August ==
List of shipwrecks: 19 August 1839
Ship	State	Description
Eliza	United Kingdom	The ship ran aground on the East Hoyle Bank, in Liverpool Bay. She was on a voyage from London to Liverpool, Lancashire. Eliza was refloated the next day and put into Liverpool.
Glenaladale	United Kingdom	The ship was run down off Southwold, Suffolk. She was on a voyage from London to St. Davids, Pembrokeshire.

== 20 August ==
List of shipwrecks: 20 August 1839
Ship	State	Description
Fortuna	Prussia	The ship was wrecked on the Goodwin Sands, Kent, United Kingdom. Her crew were rescued. She was on a voyage from Bristol, Gloucestershire, United Kingdom to Wolgast.

== 21 August ==
List of shipwrecks: 21 August 1839
Ship	State	Description
Constantine	Russian Empire	The ship was driven ashore on "Lambrusko Island" and was abandoned.
Edina	United Kingdom	The ship ran aground in the Bay of Fundy and was severely damaged. She was on a voyage from Saint John, New Brunswick, British North America to Liverpool, Lancashire. Edina was refloated and towed back to Saint John, where she arrived the next day.
Meridian	United States	The ship was driven ashore on the Goosehill Flats. She was on a voyage from City Point, Virginia to Bremen. Meridian was later refloated.

== 22 August ==
List of shipwrecks: 22 August 1839
Ship	State	Description
George Cabot	United Kingdom	The ship departed from Matanzas, Cuba for Cowes, Isle of Wight. No further trace, presumed foundered with the loss of all hands.
Isis	United Kingdom	The ship capsized in the Baltic Sea. Her crew were rescued. She drove ashore on Uton, Åland on 3 September and was wrecked.

== 23 August ==
List of shipwrecks: 23 August 1839
Ship	State	Description
Æigir	Norway	The ship was wrecked off Texel, North Holland, Netherlands. She was on a voyage from Dram to 'Amsterdam, North Holland.
Perasto	United Kingdom	The ship was wrecked at Barnegat, New Jersey, United States. Her crew were rescued. She was on a voyage from Liverpool, Lancashire to Philadelphia, Pennsylvania, United States.

== 24 August ==
List of shipwrecks: 24 August 1839
Ship	State	Description
Abeona	United Kingdom	The ship was driven ashore at Pillau, Prussia with the loss of a crew member. She was on a voyage from Pillau to Stockton-on-Tees, County Durham.
Deux Fanny	France	The ship was driven ashore and wrecked at Guadeloupe. She was on a voyage from Guadeloupe to Havre de Grâce, Seine-Inférieure.

== 25 August ==
List of shipwrecks: 25 August 1839
Ship	State	Description
Glenaladale	United Kingdom	The barque was in collision with Dange (Prussia) and foundered in the North Sea 6 to 8 nautical miles (11 to 15 km) off Orfordness, Suffolk. She was on a voyage from London to St. Andrews, Fife.
Procris	United Kingdom	The ship was wrecked on Allan's Island, Newfoundland, British North America. Her crew were rescued.
Robert Hannay	United Kingdom	The brig ran aground in the Pentland Firth and was abandoned. Her crew were rescued by the brig Peggy (United Kingdom). Robert Hannay was on a voyage from Liverpool, Lancashire to Morrison's Haven, Lothian.

== 26 August ==
List of shipwrecks: 26 August 1839
Ship	State	Description
Lucretia	United Kingdom	The ship caught fire off Kyardbilly's Point, Sydney, New South Wales. An attempt to scuttle her by HMS Herald and HMS Pelorus (both Royal Navy) was unsuccessful and she was subsequently exploded and sank. Lucretia was on a voyage from Sydney to India.

== 27 August ==
List of shipwrecks: 27 August 1839
Ship	State	Description
James Walls	United Kingdom	The schooner ran aground on the Goswick Ledge, off the coast of Northumberland. She was on a voyage from Inverkeithing, Fife to London, James Walls was later refloated and taken into Berwick upon Tweed, Northumberland.
Laurel	United Kingdom	The ship ran aground off the Rammekins Castle, Zeeland, Netherlands. She was on a voyage from Newcastle upon Tyne, Northumberland to Middelburg, Zeeland. Laurel was refloated and put into Vlissingen, Zeeland.
Magnificent	United Kingdom	The ship ran aground in the Broad River. She was on a voyage from Liverpool, Lancashire to Saint John, New Brunswick, British North America.
Ocean	United Kingdom	The ship was wrecked on the Goodwin Sands, Kent. Her crew were rescued. She was on a voyage from Cádiz, Spain to a Baltic port.
Rebecca Maria	Bremen	The ship foundered in the North Sea off the mouth of the Eider. Her crew were rescued. She was on a voyage from Bremen to Lübeck.

== 28 August ==
List of shipwrecks: 28 August 1839
Ship	State	Description
Hope	United Kingdom	The ship was driven ashore on Anholt, Denmark. She was on a voyage from Danzig to Newcastle upon Tyne, Northumberland. Hope was later refloated and taken into Helsingør, Denmark for repairs.

== 29 August ==
List of shipwrecks: 29 August 1839
Ship	State	Description
Deux Frères	France	The ship ran aground at Guadeloupe and was severely damaged. She was on a voyage from Guadeloupe to Havre de Grâce, Seine-Inférieure. Deux Frères was refloated and put back to Guadeloupe.
Louisa	United Kingdom	The ship ran aground on the Cross Sand, in the North Sea off the coast of Norfolk. She was on a voyage from Charleston, South Carolina, United States to Hull, Yorkshire. Louisa was refloated and taken into Great Yarmouth.
Thames	United Kingdom	The ship ran aground on the Cork Sand, in the North Sea off Harwich, Essex. She was on a voyage from Stockton-on-Tees, County Durham to London. Thames was refloated the next day and taken into Harwich.

== 30 August ==
List of shipwrecks: 31 August 1839
Ship	State	Description
Dover	United States	The schooner was driven ashore and wrecked 15 nautical miles (28 km) south of Cape Henry, Virginia.
Tilton	United States	The brig was driven ashore at Marksfield, New Jersey with the loss of nine lives. She was on a voyage from Calais, France to Providence, Rhode Island.

== 31 August ==
List of shipwrecks: 31 August 1839
Ship	State	Description
Gil Blas	United Kingdom	The ship was run down and sunk in the English Channel off South Foreland, Kent by Royal Adelaide (United Kingdom) with the loss of a crew member. She was on a voyage from London to Dublin. Survivors were rescued by Royal Adelaide.

== Unknown date ==
List of shipwrecks: Unknown date in August 1839
Ship	State	Description
Calista	United Kingdom	The ship was abandoned before 18 August.
Carl Heinrich	Stralsund	The ship was driven ashore at Harwich, Essex, United Kingdom. She was on a voyage from Stralsund to Hull, Yorkshire, United Kingdom.
Edward	(United Kingdom of Great Britain and Ireland) New South Wales	The schooner was wrecked in Hannah Bay. Her crew survived. She was on a voyage from Sydney to the Big River.
Eleanor	United Kingdom	The ship ran aground on the North Gar Sandbank, in the North Sea off the coast of County Durham. She was on a voyage from Quebec City, Lower Canada, British North America to Stockton-on-Tees, County Durham. Eleanor was refloated on 3 August and taken into Stockton-on-Tees.
Flamer	United Kingdom	The ship struck a sunken rock in the Orkney Islands and foundered. All on board were rescued. She was on a voyage from Liverpool, Lancashire to Danzig.
Gertrude	United Kingdom	The ship was lost at Salinas in late August. Her crew were rescued. She was on a voyage from Liverpool to Pará, Brazil.
Great Western	United States	The paddle steamer was destroyed by fire in Lake Erie.
King William	(United Kingdom of Great Britain and Ireland) New South Wales	The paddle steamer was lost at Newcastle. She was on a voyage from Sydney to Newcastle.
Laurel	United Kingdom	The ship foundered in the Bristol Channel off the coast of Glamorgan.
HMS Racehorse	Royal Navy	The sloop-of-war ran aground at the mouth of the Oyapock River. She was refloated ten days later.
Vrow Magdalena	Netherlands	The ship was wrecked on the Haaks Bank, in the North Sea with the loss of all but two of those on board. She was on a voyage from Newcastle upon Tyne to Amsterdam, North Holland.
