= List of shipwrecks in March 1843 =

The list of shipwrecks in March 1843 includes ships sunk, foundered, wrecked, grounded, or otherwise lost during March 1843.

== 1 March ==
List of shipwrecks: 1 March 1843
Ship	State	Description
Lord Anson	United Kingdom	The ship struck a rock off Guernsey, Channel Islands and was damaged. She was on a voyage from Ascension Island to London. She put into Saint Aubin, Jersey, Channel Islands.

== 2 March ==
List of shipwrecks: 2 March 1843
Ship	State	Description
Windsor Castle	United Kingdom	The ship was dismasted on 2 March in collision with the ship Berlin (United States) at 48°N 10°W in the North Atlantic, on a voyage from Bombay, India to Liverpool, Lancashire; she was abandoned on 4 March, 115 nautical miles (213 km) from Cape Clear, with Berlin and Hudson taking off the passengers and crew. The drifting derelict was boarded off Kilbaha, County Clare, Ireland and taken into Scattery Island, Kilrush.

== 3 March ==
List of shipwrecks: 3 March 1843
Ship	State	Description
Elizabeth	United Kingdom	The ship was wrecked on the Skerweathers. Her crew were rescued. She was on a voyage from Wicklow to Gloucester.
Hubert Cornelis	Netherlands	The ship was driven ashore in a capsized state south of Arcachon, Gironde, France. She was on a voyage from Bayonne, Basses-Pyrénées to Amsterdam, North Holland.
Ida	United Kingdom	The ship was wrecked on the east coast of Gran Canaria, Canary Islands. Her crew were rescued. She was on a voyage from Newcastle upon Tyne, Northumberland to Calcutta, India.
Isabella	United Kingdom	The ship was wrecked on the Haisborough Sands, in the North Sea off the coast on Norfolk. Her crew were rescued. she was on a voyage from South Shields, County Durham to London.
Mary Bell	United Kingdom	The ship ran agroundd on the Moonschar Reef, off Marsaskala, Malta. She floated off but was consequently beached. Her crew were rescued. She was on a voyage from Alexandria, Egypt to Malta.
Midge	United Kingdom	The schooner collided with Mercury (United Kingdom) in the North Sea and was abandoned. Her crew were rescued by Mercury. She was subsequently found 20 nautical miles (37 km) east north east of Hartlepool, County Durham by Thetis (United Kingdom). She was taken into Bridlington, Yorkshire. Midge was on a voyage from Grangemouth, Stirlingshire to South Shields, County Durham.
Romanoff	United Kingdom	The ship departed from London for Saint John, New Brunswick, British North America. No further trace, presumed foundered with the loss of all hands.

== 4 March ==
List of shipwrecks: 4 March 1843
Ship	State	Description
Belmont	United Kingdom	The ship ran aground at the mouth of the Mississippi River.
Eliza	United Kingdom	The ship was lost on the Skerweathers. Her crew were rescued. She was on a voyage from Cardigan to Gloucester.
Isabella Brown	United Kingdom	The ship was wrecked on the Castle Island Reef, off Castle Island, Bahamas. She was on a voyage from Aux Cayes, Haiti to Falmouth, Cornwall.
HMS Megaera	Royal Navy	The paddle sloop was wrecked on Bare Bush Key with the loss of two of her crew. She was on a voyage from Port Royal, Jamaica to Veracruz, Mexico.
Themis	United Kingdom	The ship ran aground at the mouth of the Mississippi River.
Windsor Castle	United Kingdom	The ship was in collision with an American ship and was abandoned in the Atlantic Ocean 115 nautical miles (213 km) off Cape Clear Island, County Donegal. Her crew were rescued by Hudson (United States). Windsor Castle was on a voyage from Bombay, India to Liverpool, Lancashire. She was discovered on 12 March by Pandora (United Kingdom. A steamship was sent out and towed her into Killala Bay. She was subsequently taken into Scattery Island, County Clare.

== 5 March ==
List of shipwrecks: 5 March 1843
Ship	State	Description
Caspard	France	The ship was driven ashore at "Hourtons", Seine-Inférieure with the loss of two of her crew. She was on a voyage from Le Havre, Seine-Inférieure.
Ceres	United Kingdom	The ship ran aground at Donegal. She was on a voyage from Newcastle upon Tyne, Northumberland to Donegal.
Elisa	France	The ship was driven ashore and wrecked at Cape Perpignan. Two crew survived, they were rescued off Minorca, Spain by Arabella (Spain) on 7 March. Elisa was on a voyage from Bordeaux, Gironde to Marseille, Bouches-du-Rhône.

== 6 March ==
List of shipwrecks: 6 March 1843
Ship	State	Description
Ceres	United Kingdom	The ship was driven ashore near Donegal.
Lion	United Kingdom	The steamship foundered in the North Sea 20 nautical miles (37 km) south of South Shields, County Durham.
Oberpræsident	Prussia	The ship was driven ashore and wrecked on Anholt, Denmark. Her crew were rescued. She was on a voyage from St. David's, Pembrokeshire, United Kingdom to Swinemünde.

== 7 March ==
List of shipwrecks: 7 March 1843
Ship	State	Description
Adamant	United States	The brig was abandoned at sea. Her crew were rescued.
Dagger	United Kingdom	The ship ran aground in the Humber near Paull, Yorkshire. She was on a voyage from Hull, Yorkshire to Hamburg. She was refloated later that day and resumed her voyage.
Guide	United Kingdom	The full-rigged ship ran aground on the Hartwell Reef, on the north coast of Faial Island, Azores. She broke up on 20 March; all on board survived. She was on her maiden voyage, from Liverpool, Lancashire to Calcutta, India.
Leo	United Kingdom	The brig ran aground on the Herd Sand, in the North Sea off the coast of County Durham. She was refloated.

== 8 March ==
List of shipwrecks: 8 March 1843
Ship	State	Description
Mary	United Kingdom	The ship was abandoned in the Atlantic Ocean 50 nautical miles (93 km) south west of The Lizard, Cornwall. Her crew were rescued by Gabrielle (France). Mary was on a voyage from London to Barcelona, Spain and Gibraltar.

== 9 March ==
List of shipwrecks: 9 March 1843
Ship	State	Description
Elizabeth	United Kingdom	The ship was driven ashore and severely damaged at Teignmouth, Devon. She was on a voyage from Sunderland, County Durham to Teignmouth. She was refloated and taken into Teignmouth.

== 10 March ==
List of shipwrecks: 10 March 1843
Ship	State	Description
Noah	United Kingdom	The ship ran aground on "Vædderoe Island", Denmark. She was on a voyage from Dundee, Forfarshire to Memel, Prussia. She was refloated and resumed her voyage.
Stephen Wright	United Kingdom	The ship sprang a leak and was beached at Stromness, Orkney Islands. She was on a voyage from South Shields, County Durham to Philadelphia, Pennsylvania, United States.
Woods	United Kingdom	The ship was driven ashore and capsized at Maryport, Cumberland. She was on a voyage from Belfast, County Antrim to Maryport. She was refloated on 14 March and taken into Maryport.

== 12 March ==
List of shipwrecks: 12 March 1843
Ship	State	Description
Amelia	Danzig	The ship ran aground on the Chalk Groundsm in the Baltic Sea. She was on a voyage from Danzig to Liverpool, Lancashire, United Kingdom. She was later refloated.
Commerce	United Kingdom	The schooner was run down and sunk in the North Sea off Robin Hood's Bay, Yorkshire by Mount Charles (United Kingdom). Her crew were rescued. She was on a voyage from Newcastle upon Tyne, Northumberland to Southwold, Suffolk.
Irish Lily	United Kingdom	The ship ran aground on a rock off Sully Island, Glamorgan. Her crew were rescued. She was on a voyage from Waterford to Newport, Monmouthshire.
Magdalene	United Kingdom	The schooner ran aground near Berwick upon Tweed, Northumberland. She was on a voyage from Dunbar, Lothian to South Shields, County Durham. She was refloated and resumed her voyage.
Revanche	Hamburg	The ship was wrecked near Siculiana, Sicily with the loss of all hands. She was on a voyage from Siculiana to Saint Petersburg, Russia.
Truro	United Kingdom	The ship was driven ashore and wrecked at The Mumbles, Glamorgan. Her crew were rescued.

== 13 March ==
List of shipwrecks: 13 March 1843
Ship	State	Description
Caroline	United Kingdom	The ship was in collision with Sisters and was beached at Great Yarmouth, Norfolk. She was on a voyage from South Shields, County Durham to Rouen, Seine-Inférieure, France. Caroline was later refloated and taken into Great Yarmouth in a severely damaged condition.
Ceres	United Kingdom	The ship ran aground on a reef between Anholt and Læsø, Denmark. She was refloated but consequently foundered in the Kattegat off Falkenberg, Sweden the next day. Her crew survived. She was on a voyage from Newcastle upon Tyne, Northumberland to Stettin.
Elizabeth	Norway	The ship was wrecked near Varberg, Sweden.
Heinrich	Denmark	The schooner was wrecked at Melazzo, Sicily.
Land	United Kingdom	The ship ran aground on the West Hoyle Bank, in Liverpool Bay and was abandoned . She was subsequently driven ashore near the Point of Ayr Lighthouse, Flintshire. Land was on a voyage from Londonderry to Liverpool, Lancashire. She was refloated the next day and taken into Liverpool in a severely damaged condition.

== 14 March ==
List of shipwrecks: 14 March 1843
Ship	State	Description
Henry	United Kingdom	The ship was driven ashore and wrecked on Faial Island, Azores. Her crew were rescued.
Jason	Denmark	The ship was wrecked near Nuevitas, Cuba. Her crew were rescued. She was on a voyage from Copenhagen to Havana, Cuba.
Merlin	United Kingdom	The ship was driven ashore at Sand Point, near Blyth, Northumberland.
Theon	United Kingdom	The brig ran aground on the Shipwash Sand, in the North Sea off the coast of Essex. She was on a voyage from South Shields, County Durham to Gibraltar. She was refloated on 16 March and taken into Harwich, Essex.

== 15 March ==
List of shipwrecks: 15 March 1843
Ship	State	Description
Arrow	United Kingdom	The ship was driven ashore at the mouth of the River Moy, County Mayo. She was on a voyage from Liverpool, Lancashire to Ballina, County Mayo or vice versa.
Chieftain	United Kingdom	The schooner was abandoned in the Atlantic Ocean. Her crew were rescued by New England (United States). Chieftai was on a voyage from Matanzas, Cuba to Cork.
USS Grampus	United States Navy	The 10-gun schooner foundered in the Atlantic Ocean off Charleston, South Carolina or St Augustine, Florida in a gale, with the loss of all hands.

== 16 March ==
List of shipwrecks: 16 March 1843
Ship	State	Description
Charlotte	United Kingdom	The ship was driven ashore in the River Mersey. She was on a voyage from Liverpool, Lancashire to New Orleans, Louisiana, United States. She was refloated and put back to Liverpool.
Elizabeth	United Kingdom	The ship was in collision with Matthew (United Kingdom and sank. Her crew were rescued. She was on a voyage from Troon, Ayrshire to Belfast, County Antrim.
Latona	United Kingdom	The ship was driven ashore at Rye, Sussex. She was on a voyage from Sunderland, County Durham to Rye. Latona was refloated and taken into Rye.
Maria	United Kingdom	The schooner capsized and sank off Madeira. Her crew were rescued.

== 17 March ==
List of shipwrecks: 17 March 1843
Ship	State	Description
Carl	Prussia	The ship was wrecked on the south west point of Rønne, Denmark. Her crew were rescued. She was on a voyage from Stolpemünde to Copenhagen, Denmark.
Ebenezer	United Kingdom	The ship ran aground on the Herd Sand, in the North Sea off the coast of County Durham. She was refloated.
Mary Jane	(United Kingdom of Great Britain and Ireland) British North America	The schooner was wrecked in Long Island Bay, Grand Manan, New Brunswick in a storm with the loss of crew of three. She was on a voyage from Yarmouth, Nova Scotia to Grand Manan.
Mechanic	(United Kingdom of Great Britain and Ireland) British North America	The ship was wrecked on Partridge Island, Nova Scotia. Her crew were rescued.

== 19 March ==
List of shipwrecks: 19 March 1843
Ship	State	Description
Anchor	United Kingdom	The ship ran aground on the Whitten Sand, in the North Sea and capsized with the loss of two of her crew. She was on a voyage from London to Goole, Yorkshire.
Ann and Margaret	United Kingdom	The ship was driven ashore and wrecked 14 nautical miles (26 km) south of Bridlington, Yorkshire. She was on a voyage from the River Tyne to London.
Ashley	United Kingdom	The ship was driven ashore at Staithes, Yorkshire, Her crew were rescued.
Destin	France	The ship was driven ashore neat St. Ubes, Portugal.
Elizabeth Marie	Flag unknown	The ship was driven ashore and wrecked south of Memel, Prussia. Her crew were rescued.
Escort	United Kingdom	The ship ran aground on the Sheringham Shoal, in the North Sea off the coast of Norfolk and sank. She was on a voyage from Hartlepool, County Durham to Bordeaux, Gironde, France.
Lord Ernest	United Kingdom	The ship was driven ashore and wrecked north of Flamborough Head, Yorkshire.
Mary	United Kingdom	The ship was driven ashore and wrecked at Pakefield, Suffolk. Her crew were rescued.
New Holland	United Kingdom	The ship was driven ashore and sank at Gosport, Hampshire. She was refloated the next day and beached.
Petrel	United Kingdom	The ship was wrecked on the Barneston Rocks, off the coast of Yorkshire. Her crew were rescued. She was on a voyage from London to Montrose, Forfarshire. Petrel was refloated on 31 March and taken into Scarborough, Yorkshire.
Pilot	United Kingdom	The ship ran aground off the coast of Essex. She was on a voyage from Goole, Yorkshire to London.

== 20 March ==
List of shipwrecks: 20 March 1843
Ship	State	Description
Athens	United States	The ship ran aground on the Hinderbank, in the North Sea off the coast of Zeeland, Netherlands. She was later refloated.
Commerce	United Kingdom	The brig was run down and sunk in the North Sea 2.5 nautical miles (4.6 km) off Flamborough Head, Yorkshire by Mountcharles (United Kingdom). Her crew were rescued by Mountcharles.
Margaretha	United Kingdom	The ship ran aground on the Pan Sand, in the North Sea off the north coast of Kent. She was on a voyage from Batavia, Netherlands East Indies to London. She was refloated and towed into the River Thames.
Mary	United Kingdom	The ship was driven ashore at Pakefield, Suffolk. Her crew were rescued. She was refloated the next day and taken into Lowestoft, Suffolk.
Perseus	United Kingdom	The ship ran aground on the Holme Sand, in the North Sea. she was on a voyage from Hull, Yorkshire to Falmouth, Cornwall. She was refloated.
Restless	United Kingdom	The ship was driven ashore between Skur House and Hutching's Point, Glamorgan. She became a wreck on 22 March.
True Blue	United Kingdom	The ship ran aground on the West Rocks, off Harwich, Essex. She was on a voyage from Aberdeen to London. She was refloated with assistance from Aurora's Increase and Sylven and four other smacks (all United Kingdom) and taken into Harwich.

== 21 March ==
List of shipwrecks: 21 March 1843
Ship	State	Description
Astley	United Kingdom	The ship was driven ashore and wrecked 9 nautical miles (17 km) north of Whitby, Yorkshire. Her crew were rescued.
Elizabeth	United Kingdom	The galiot was run down and sunk by the schooner Matthew (United Kingdom) off Belfast, County Antrim. Her crew were rescued by the sloop Minerva (United Kingdom).
Feronia	United Kingdom	The ship was wrecked off Cape St. Vincent, Spain with the loss of six of her crew. She was on a voyage from Bristol, Gloucestershire to Palermo, Sicily.
Patriot	United Kingdom	The ship was wrecked near Elie, Fife. Her crew were rescued. She was on a voyage from Antwerp, Belgium to Grangemouth, Stirlingshire.
Thomas Dryden	United Kingdom	The brig ran aground in the Pentland Firth and was holed. She was consequently beached at Duncansby Head, Caithness. Her crew survived. Thomas Dryden was on a voyage from South Shields, County Durham to Dublin. She was a total loss.

== 22 March ==
List of shipwrecks: 22 March 1843
Ship	State	Description
Earl Roden	United Kingdom	The steamship was wrecked off Ballycotton, County Cork. Her crew were rescued. She was on a voyage from Cork to London.
Hensight	Norway	The ship was wrecked on the Île d'Yeu, Vendée, France. She was on a voyage from Christianstadt to a French port.
Jane	United Kingdom	The ship ran aground on the Nore. She was on a voyage from Patras, Greece to London. Jane was refloated the next day and towed into London.
Toward Castle	United Kingdom	The ship struck a sunken rock and was beached at Port Ellen, Islay.
Twinde	Prussia	The ship capsized at Le Hourdel, Somme, France. She was on a voyage from Memel to Abbeville, Somme.
Two Pollies	United States	The galiot was abandoned in the Atlantic Ocean 160 leagues (480 nautical miles (890 km) east north east of Cape Hatteras, North Carolina. Her crew were rescued by Christophe Columb (France).

== 23 March ==
List of shipwrecks: 23 March 1843
Ship	State	Description
Eucles	United Kingdom	The ship ran aground in the Hooghly River and was severely damaged.
Isabella	United Kingdom	The ship was driven ashore at "Hillya", Orkney Islands. She was on a voyage from Liverpool, Lancashire to Stettin. Isabella was refloated on 25 March and taken into Stromness for repairs.
Nautilus	United Kingdom	The brig was driven ashore at Aberdeen. Her crew were rescued by the Aberdeen Lifeboat. She was refloated on 29 March and taken into Aberdeen.
Oscar	Norway	The ship was driven ashore and wrecked at Montrose, Forfarshire, United Kingdom. Her crew were rescued.

== 24 March ==
List of shipwrecks: 24 March 1843
Ship	State	Description
James Ryder	United States	The ship was wrecked on the Jadder Sandbank. She was on a voyage from Charleston, South Carolina to Stettin.
John and Elizabeth	United Kingdom	The ship was wrecked on the Arnot Sand, in the North Sea off the coast of Forfarshire. Her crew were rescued.
Sussex	United Kingdom	The schooner was abandoned in the Atlantic Ocean. She was on a voyage from Brier Island, Nova Scotia, British North America to Saint Lucia.
Victoria	United Kingdom	The ship ran aground and was severely damaged at Peterhead, Aberdeenshire. She was on a voyage from Southampton, Hampshire to Peterhead.

== 25 March ==
List of shipwrecks: 25 March 1843
Ship	State	Description
City of Aberdeen	United Kingdom	The ship was wrecked on the Topocalma Shoal. Her crew were rescued. She was on a voyage from a port in New Zealand to Valparaíso, Chile.
Convocate	(United Kingdom of Great Britain and Ireland) British North America	The ship was abandoned in the Atlantic Ocean. Her crew were rescued. She was on a voyage from Shelburne, Nova Scotia to Berbice, British Honduras.
Elizabeth	United Kingdom	The ship was wrecked on the Herd Sand, in the North Sea off the coast of County Durham. Her crew were rescued. She was on a voyage from Stettin to South Shields, County Durham.
Ellen and Ann	United Kingdom	The ship ran aground and capsized in the River Usk.
Helena	Prussia	The full-rigged ship was wrecked on The Manacles with the loss of her captain. She was on a voyage from Memel to Bristol, Gloucestershire, United Kingdom.
Hope	United Kingdom	The ship was holed by her anchor. She was beached at South Shields. She was on a voyage from Berwick upon Tweed, Northumberland to Rouen, Seine-Inférieure, France.
Mary	United Kingdom	The schooner was driven ashore at Caister-on-Sea, Norfolk.
Oscar	Norway	The ship was wrecked at Montrose, Forfarshire, United Kingdom. Her crew were rescued.
Stillman	United Kingdom	The brig was driven ashore and wrecked on the Skullmartin Rock, near Ballywalter, County Down. Her crew were rescued by the Coast Guard. She was on a voyage from Glasgow, Renfrewshire to Demerara, British Honduras.

== 26 March ==
List of shipwrecks: 26 March 1843
Ship	State	Description
Autumn	United Kingdom	The ship was beached at The Mumbles, Glamorgan. She was on a voyage from Cardiff, Glamorgan to Portsmouth, Hampshire.
Elizabeth	United Kingdom	The ship was wrecked on the Herd Sand, in the North Sea off the coast of County Durham. Her crew were rescued. She was on a voyage from Stettin to South Shields, County Durham.
Great Britain	United Kingdom	The schooner ran aground on the Klein Vogel Sand, in the North Sea off the Dutch coast. She was on a voyage from Cuxhaven to Portmadoc, Caernarfonshire. She was refloated on 28 March.
Hoppet	Sweden	The ship was wrecked on the Lesser Goutelande Bank, in the North Sea off the coast of Zeeland, Netherlands. She was on a voyage from Gothenburg to Antwerp, Belgium.
John and Elizabeth	United Kingdom	The brig was wrecked at Montrose, Forfarshire with the loss of all six of her crew.
John and Frederick	United Kingdom	The schooner was severely damaged by fire at Whitby, Yorkshire.
Lowther	United Kingdom	The ship ran aground on the Swine Bottoms, in the Baltic Sea. She was on a voyage from Liverpool, Lancashire to Wismar. She was refloated the next day and taken into Helsingør, Denmark.
Maria	Norway	The ship ran aground and sank at Gravelines, Nord, France. She was on a voyage from Kragerø to Gravelines. She was refloated on 30 March and taken into Gravelines.
Mary	United Kingdom	The ship was driven ashore at Great Yarmouth, Norfolk. She was on a voyage from London to Warkworth, Northumberland.
Sarah	United Kingdom	The ship was in collision with William Penn (United States) and was consequently beached at Wicklow. She was on a voyage from the Clyde to Gibraltar.
Wellington	United Kingdom	The ship was in collision with Dolphin (United Kingdom) and foundered in the North Sea off the coast of Norfolk with the loss of a crew member.

== 27 March ==
List of shipwrecks: 27 March 1843
Ship	State	Description
Elector or Electra	United Kingdom	The ship ran aground on the Cullercoats Sand, in the North Sea off the coast of County Durham. Her crew were rescued by the South Shields Lifeboat, which was taken overland and launched from Whitby, Yorkshire.
George	United Kingdom	The brig was driven ashore and wrecked at Warkworth, Northumberland. Her crew were rescued.
Great Britain	United Kingdom	After two days of hurricane damage in mid-Atlantic and the loss of one crew member, the barque was considered a complete wreck on 27 March. The surviving 14 crew and 9 passengers were rescued by Philadelphia (Bremen) on 30 March and the ship was abandoned in position 48°N 33°W. Great Britain was on a voyage from Newport, Monmouthshire to New York, United States.
Irvine	United Kingdom	The ship was abandoned off St. Ann's Head, Pembrokeshire.
Jane	United Kingdom	The ship was driven ashore and severely damaged on the coast of Northumberland. Her crew were rescued.
Native	United Kingdom	The schooner was driven ashore and wrecked at Torre Abbey, Devon. All sixteen people on board were rescued. She was on a voyage from Bridport, Dorset to Newfoundland, British North America. Native was refloated on 7 April and taken into Torquay, Devon.
Nicoline	Russia	The ship, on a voyage from Odesa to Falmouth, Cornwall, was run down by an unidentified vessel off the Scilly isles and abandoned; the crew were picked up by a ship Aid. The derelict was discovered on 31 March in 50°N 8°W by the brig Clara and Emma (United Kingdom) and taken into Milford, Wales.
Pauline	France	The ship was driven ashore and wrecked at Exmouth, Devon, United Kingdom with the loss of all hands. She was on a voyage from Bordeaux, Gironde to Le Havre, Seine-Inférieure.
Rossini	Flag unknown	The ship was wrecked at Cape San Antonio, Cuba. Her crew were rescued. She wason a voyage from Montevideo, Uruguay to Havana, Cuba.
Wellington	United Kingdom	The ship was run down and sunk off "Clewer". Her crew were rescued.
Woodman	United Kingdom	The ship ran aground on the Nore and was damaged. She was on a voyage from Newcastle upon Tyne, Northumberland to London. She was refloated and beached at Sheerness, Kent.

== 28 March ==
List of shipwrecks: 28 March 1843
Ship	State	Description
Muvinia	United Kingdom	The ship was in collision with John (United Kingdom) and foundered in the Bristol Channel off Milford Haven, Pembrokeshire. Her crew were rescued.
Pero	United Kingdom	The derelict barque was driven ashore near White Point, County Cork.
Samuel Abbott	United Kingdom	The ship was driven ashore near White Point.

== 29 March ==
List of shipwrecks: 29 March 1843
Ship	State	Description
Alderman Thompson	United Kingdom	The ship was wrecked on Anticosti Island, Province of Canada, British North America with the loss of three of her crew. She was on a voyage from Quebec City, Province of Canada to Liverpool, Lancashire.
Ann	United Kingdom	The ship ran aground at New Orleans, Louisiana, United States. She was on a voyage from Liverpool to New Orleans.
Vere	United Kingdom	The barque ran aground on Herd Harbour Point, Campbell's Islands, New Brunswick, British North America. She was refloated but consequently had to be beached on Sandy Island. Vere was on a voyage from Poole, Dorset to Saint John, New Brunswick. She was condemned.

== 30 March ==
List of shipwrecks: 30 March 1843
Ship	State	Description
Earl of March	United Kingdom	The ship ran ashore on Stroma, in the Firth of Clyde. She was on a voyage from Cromarty to Campbeltown, Argyllshire.
Glory	United Kingdom	The ship was wrecked in Dunwoodly Bay, County Cork. Her crew were rescued.
Jane	United Kingdom	The ship sprang a leak and was beached at Grimsby, Lincolnshire. She was on a voyage from South Shields, County Durham to Gibraltar.
Medora	United Kingdom	The ship collided with Sarah (United Kingdom) and foundered in the North Sea off Cromer, Norfolk. Her crew were rescued. She was on a voyage from Hartlepool, County Durham to Faversham, Kent.

== 31 March ==
List of shipwrecks: 31 March 1843
Ship	State	Description
Doctor Syntax	United Kingdom	The ship ran aground on Inchkeith. She was refloated and put into Leith Lothian for repairs.
Libra	United Kingdom	The ship was beached in Rhosilli Bay. Her crew were rescued.
Margaret and Ann	United Kingdom	The ship was driven ashore at Great Yarmouth, Norfolk. She was on a voyage from Stockton-on-Tees, County Durham to Dover, Kent. She was refloated.
Martha	United Kingdom	The brig was driven ashore and wrecked at Rattray Head, Aberdeenshire. She was on a voyage from Sunderland, County Durham to Montreal, Province of Canada, British North America.
Reindeer	United Kingdom	The ship was driven ashore and lost at Sulina, Ottoman Empire. She was on a voyage from Liverpool, Lancashire to Sulina.

== Unknown date ==
List of shipwrecks: Unknown date in March 1843
Ship	State	Description
Bengali	France	The barque was abandoned in the Atlantic Ocean off Cape Recife, Africa. Her crew were rescued by Marie en Hillegond (Netherlands).
Brothers	United Kingdom	The ship ran aground on Mutton Island, County Galway. She was refloated on 14 March and taken into Galway.
Camoens	France	The ship grounded before 23 March whilst on passage from Buenos Aires, Argentina to Montevideo, Uruguay. She was later refloated and found to be little damaged and not leaky.
Conservative	United Kingdom	The ship was wrecked in Saldanha Bay before 10 March with the loss of at least four of her crew, and possibly all hands. She was on a voyage from London to the Cape Colony.
Elise	Flag unknown	The ship was driven ashore near Almería, Spain, coming from Gijón, Spain. Her crew were rescued.
Elizabeth	Netherlands	The ship was wrecked at sea before 23 March. She was on a voyage from Bordeaux, Gironde, France to Rotterdam, South Holland.
Florian	United States	The ship went aground near the Prince's Bay Lighthouse, New York. She was on a voyage from New York City to Amsterdam, North Holland, Netherlands. She was refloated and put back to New York City.
George	United States	The ship reported on 25 March ashore near "Batz" or "Ratz". She was refloated by 29 March, undamaged.
Gode Hendrick	Flag unknown	The ship was driven ashore in a capsized condition on Île Dieu.
Hercules	United Kingdom	The ship was wrecked near Mobile, Alabama, United States. She was on a voyage from Liverpool, Lancashire to Mobile.
Mary Ann or Mary Jane	United States	The ship was abandoned in the Atlantic Ocean off Cape Henry, Virginia. Her crew were rescued by Elizabeth (United Kingdom.
North American	United States	The whaler was wrecked at Leschenaut.
Smart	United Kingdom	The schooner departed from Banff, Aberdeenshire for London before 6 March. Presumed foundered in the North Sea with the loss of all six crew.
Stranger	(United Kingdom of Great Britain and Ireland) New South Wales	The cutter was reported ashore at the mouth of the Macleay River, New South Wales before 30 March.
Thadeus	United Kingdom	The ship was wrecked off the Isles of Scilly with the loss of three of her crew. Survivors were rescued by the steamship Morlaisien (France). Thadeus was on a voyage from Cuba to Dundee, Forfarshire.
Trial	United Kingdom	The ship was wrecked on 30 or 31 March at Copiapó, Chile, while loading for Swansea, Glamorgan. Her crew were rescued.
Union	Norway	The ship was wrecked on the Norwegian coast before 11 March.
West Indian	United Kingdom	The ship got onshore in the Dardanelles before 3 March, on voyage from Odesa. She was refloated with assistance from SMS Montecucelo ( Austrian Navy), undamaged.
