= List of shipwrecks in January 1838 =

The list of shipwrecks in January 1838 includes ships sunk, foundered, wrecked, grounded, or otherwise lost during January 1838.

== 1 January ==
List of shipwrecks: 1 January 1838
Ship	State	Description
Auguste	Stettin	The ship was wrecked on the coast of Norway. Her crew were rescued. She was on a voyage from Laguna to Stettin.
Cervantes	United Kingdom	The ship was wrecked off Veracruz, Mexico.
Lara	United Kingdom	The ship was driven ashore north of Varna, Ottoman Empire. Her crew were rescued.
Midas	United Kingdom	The ship was driven ashore and wrecked in the Black Sea with the loss of two of her crew. She was on a voyage from Odesa to Bristol, Gloucestershire.
Tiro	United Kingdom	The ship was driven ashore north of Varna. Her crew were rescued.

== 2 January ==
List of shipwrecks: 2 January 1838
Ship	State	Description
Anna	United Kingdom	The smack struck the Elbow End, in the North Sea off the coast of Forfarshire. She was on a voyage from Dundee, Forfarshire to Glasgow, Renfrewshire. Anna put back to Dundee, where she sank.
Augusta	Denmark	The ship was driven ashore nearChristiansand, Norway. Her crew were rescued. She was on a voyage from Laguna to Copenhagen.
Lord Nelson	(United Kingdom of Great Britain and Ireland) Isle of Man	The sloop collided with a schooner and was lost near Stranraer, Wigtownshire with all three of her crew. She was on a voyage from Whitehaven, Cumberland to Ramsey, Isle of Man.
Rebecca	United Kingdom	The ship was driven ashore at Penzance, Cornwall. She was refloated the next day.

== 3 January ==
List of shipwrecks: 3 January 1838
Ship	State	Description
Alfred	United Kingdom	The ship foundered off São Miguel Island, Azores. Her crew were rescued.

== 4 January ==
List of shipwrecks: 4 January 1838
Ship	State	Description
Defiance	United Kingdom	The brig was lost in the Chilia branch of the Danube with the loss of all but two of her crew. She was on a voyage from Odesa to an English port.
Favourite	United Kingdom	The ship was wrecked near Cork. She was on a voyage from Cork to Waterford.
Ferdinand	Rostock	The ship ran aground at "Swineboc". She was on a voyage from Rostock to an American port. Ferdinand was later refloated and put into Helsingør, Denmark for repairs.
Martha	United Kingdom	The ship ran aground and sank on the Lancaster Sands. Her crew were rescued. She was on a voyage from Dundalk, County Louth to Glasson Dock, Lancashire.
Woodman	United Kingdom	The barque was wrecked near Cape Negro, Nova Scotia, British North America. Her crew were rescued. She was on a voyage from Belfast, County Antrim to Saint John, New Brunswick, British North America.

== 5 January ==
List of shipwrecks: 5 January 1838
Ship	State	Description
Martha	United Kingdom	The ship was run down and sunk in the River Severn by Margaret (United Kingdom) with the loss of two of the four people on board. She was on a voyage from Droitwich, Worcestershire to Gloucester.

== 6 January ==
List of shipwrecks: 6 January 1838
Ship	State	Description
Briseis	United Kingdom	The ship departed from Falmouth, Cornwall for Halifax, Nova Scotia, British North America. No further trace, presumed foundered with the loss of all hands.
Howard	United Kingdom	The ship was driven ashore near Calais, France. She was on a voyage from Hamburg to New York. Howard was later refloated and put into Cowes, Isle of Wight for repairs.
Tembringeren	Netherlands	The ship departed from Livorno, Grand Duchy of Tuscany for Hamburg. No further trace, presumed foundered with the loss of all hands.
Waterwitch	United Kingdom	The brigantine was wrecked on the Blackwater Bank, in the Irish Sea off the coast of County Wexford. Her crew survived. She was on a voyage from Liverpool, Lancashire to Barbados.

== 7 January ==
List of shipwrecks: 7 January 1838
Ship	State	Description
Clonmell	United Kingdom	The steamship ran aground on the North Bank, in Liverpool Bay. She was on a voyage from Waterford to Liverpool, Lancashire.
Toward Castle	United Kingdom	The whaler, a full-rigged ship, was wrecked on the coast of California with the loss of 15 of her 31 crew. She was on a voyage from London to the South Seas.

== 8 January ==
List of shipwrecks: 8 January 1838
Ship	State	Description
Nautilus	United Kingdom	The barque was driven ashore on Clee Ness, Lincolnshire. She was on a voyage from Stockton-on-Tees, County Durham to London. Nautilus was refloated the next day.
Peace	United Kingdom	The pilot boat, a yawl, was wrecked on the Newcombe Sand, in the North Sea off the coast of Norfolk with the loss of all fifteen people on board.

== 9 January ==
List of shipwrecks: 9 January 1838
Ship	State	Description
Ann	United States	The stolen schooner, seized by American members of the secret Hunters' Lodge organization, was damaged by gunfire by Canadian militia while she was bombarding Fort Malden and Amherstburg, Upper Canada. She drifted ashore and wa captured by the Canadians.
Elizabeth	United Kingdom	The ship was driven ashore and wrecked at "Linga Chettys Choudry", 57 nautical miles (106 km) south of Madras, India. All on board were rescued. She was on a voyage from Bristol, Gloucestershire to Madras and Calcutta.
Lark	United Kingdom	The brig was driven ashore at Ring, County Waterford. Her crew survived. She was on a voyage from Newfoundland to Bristol, Gloucestershire.
Margaret Richardson	United Kingdom	The ship sprang a leak and was abandoned in the Atlantic Ocean. Her crew were rescued by Clementina (United Kingdom). Margaret Richardson was on a voyage from London to Genoa, Kingdom of Sardinia and Livorno, Grand Duchy of Tuscany.
William	United Kingdom	The ship was wrecked on the Middle Heaps, in the North Sea off the coast of Essex. Her crew were rescued by Princess Victoria(United Kingdom). She was on a voyage from Hartlepool, County Durham to London.

== 10 January ==
List of shipwrecks: 10 January 1838
Ship	State	Description
Brunswick	United Kingdom	The schooner was driven ashore in Lamlash Loch. She was on a voyage from Greenock, Renfrewshire to Lisbon, Portugal. Brunswick was refloated and put into Troon, Ayrshire for repairs.
Favourite	United Kingdom	The ship was driven ashore and damaged at Messina, Sicily. She was later refloated and taken into Messina for repairs.

== 12 January ==
List of shipwrecks: 12 January 1838
Ship	State	Description
Joseph Sprague	United States	The ship was wrecked off Bermuda. Her crew were rescued. She was on a voyage from New York to Saint Croix, Virgin Islands.

== 13 January ==
List of shipwrecks: 13 January 1838
Ship	State	Description
Aimwell	United Kingdom	The ship was wrecked on a reef in Blacksod Bay. She was on a voyage from Glasgow, Renfrewshire to Limerick.
Comet	United Kingdom	The ship was wrecked on the Sheringham Shoals, in the North Sea off the coast of Norfolk. She came ashore at Blakeney, Norfolk on 26 January.

== 14 January ==
List of shipwrecks: 14 January 1838
Ship	State	Description
Ann	United Kingdom	The ship sprang a leak and was abandoned in the Atlantic Ocean. She was on a voyage from Saint Andrews, New Brunswick, British North America to Liverpool.
Fanny	United Kingdom	The ship was driven ashore and wrecked near Calais, France. She was on a voyage from Calais to Dover, Kent.
Success	United Kingdom	The sloop was driven ashore at Stromness, Orkney Islands. She was on a voyage from Newport, Monmouthshire to Arbroath, Forfarshire.

== 15 January ==
List of shipwrecks: 15 January 1838
Ship	State	Description
Angeline	France	The ship was wrecked east of Dunkirk, Nord. She was on a voyage from Dunkirk to Marseille, Bouches-du-Rhône.
Frontador	Brazil	The ship was driven ashore south of Valparaíso, Chile with the loss of all but three of her crew. She was on a voyage from Rio de Janeiro to Valparaíso.
Industry	United Kingdom	The ship foundered off Cromer, Norfolk. She was on a voyage from Grimsby, Lincolnshire to Thornham, Norfolk.

== 16 January ==
List of shipwrecks: 16 January 1838
Ship	State	Description
Pandora	United Kingdom	The ship was wrecked on the Point de Coubre, Charente-Maritime, France with the loss of five of her nine crew. She was on a voyage from Sunderland, County Durham to Bordeaux, Gironde, France.
Sprightly	United Kingdom	The ship was driven ashore at South Shields, County Durham. She subsequently broke up.

== 18 January ==
List of shipwrecks: 18 January 1838
Ship	State	Description
Grenada	United Kingdom	The ship was driven ashore on the South Breakers. She was on a voyage from Trinidad to Savannah, Georgia, United States.
Maria	United Kingdom	The ship sank at "Rosland". She was on a voyage from Wexford to Dublin.
Norfolk	United Kingdom	The ship ran aground at Hartlepool, County Durham.
Sarah	United Kingdom	The ship sank off Ilfracombe, Devon. She was on a voyage from Glasgow, Renfrewshire to Bristol, Gloucestershire. Sarah was refloated on 14 February and taken into Ilfracombe in a severely damaged condition.
Sisters	United Kingdom	The ship ran aground at Hartlepool.

== 19 January ==
List of shipwrecks: 19 January 1838
Ship	State	Description
Ann and Elizabeth	United Kingdom	The ship was driven ashore at Carne, Cornwall with the loss of a crew member. She was on a voyage from Cork to Cardiff, Glamorgan.
Elenora	United Kingdom	The schooner was driven ashore and wrecked 8 nautical miles (15 km) west of Dunfanaghy, County Donegal. Her crew were rescued. She was on a voyage from Saltcoats, Ayrshire to Sligo.
Lord of the Isles	United Kingdom	The ship foundered in the North Sea off Johnshaven, Aberdeenshire.

== 20 January ==
List of shipwrecks: 20 January 1838
Ship	State	Description
Barbara	United Kingdom	The ship was driven ashore near "Skitter", Yorkshire. She was on a voyage from Odesa to Hull, Yorkshire.
Benjamin	United Kingdom	The ship departed from Beaufort, North Carolina or Beaufort, South Carolina, United States for London. No further trace, presumed foundered with the loss of all hands.
David	United Kingdom	The ship was driven ashore east of "Geneva" She was on a voyage from "Teheran" to "Geneva".
Eleanor	United Kingdom	The ship was wrecked near "Woreland". She was on a voyage from Saltcoats, Ayrshire to Sligo.
Glasgow	United Kingdom	The ship was driven ashore at Belmullet, County Mayo. She was on a voyage from Glasgow, Renfrewshire to Limerick. Glasgow was refloated on 22 March and taken into Westport, County Mayo to discharge her cargo. She then sailed for Glasgow for repairs.
Gratitude	United Kingdom	The ship was driven ashore on "Enniskern Island", County Mayo. Her crew were rescued. She was refloated on 21 May and put into Westport, County Mayo for repairs.
Hope	United Kingdom	The ship was driven ashore on Spurn Point, East Riding of Yorkshire. She was on a voyage from London to Newcastle upon Tyne, Northumberland. Hope was refloated on 23 January and taken into Hull, Yorkshire.
Killarney	United Kingdom	The paddle steamer was wrecked at Roberts Cove, County Cork with the loss of 24 of the 49 people on board. She was on a voyage from Cork to Bristol, Gloucestershire.
Le Reparateur de Charente	France	The brig was wrecked at Kilcolman, County Cork. Her crew were rescued. She was on a voyage from the Charente to Liverpool, Lancashire, United Kingdom.
Lucinda	United Kingdom	The whaler, a barque, was wrecked on a reef 75 nautical miles (139 km) east by north of New Caledonia. There were 29 survivors.
HMRC Neptune	Board of Customs	The ship was driven ashore on "Enniskern Island". Her crew were rescued.
Paris	United States	The brig was run down and sunk in the Atlantic Ocean (39°48′N 59°55′W) by Troy (United States) with the loss of all hands. She was on a voyage from Stockholm, Sweden to New York.
Thames	United Kingdom	The snow was wrecked on the Duboy Flats. She was on a voyage from the Gulf of Darién to Liverpool.
Tryphena	United Kingdom	The schooner was driven ashore and wrecked at Castletown, County Cork. She was on a voyage from "Nidbear" to London.
Victory	United Kingdom	The ship was wrecked on Eleuthera. Her crew were rescued. She was on a voyage from St. Thomas, Virgin Islands to Matanzas, Cuba.
Unnamed	Kingdom of the Two Sicilies	The ship was wrecked at Polurrian, Cornwall, United Kingdom with the loss of all hands, at least eleven lives.

== 21 January ==
List of shipwrecks: 21 January 1838
Ship	State	Description
Ceres	United Kingdom	The ship sprang a leak and was abandoned in the Atlantic Ocean. She was on a voyage from to Isles of Scilly to São Miguel Island, Azores.
Colombia	United Kingdom	The ship was abandoned in the Atlantic Ocean (43°30′N 29°30′W). All on board were rescued. She was on a voyage from Bombay, India to Mauritius and London.
Hercules	United Kingdom	The ship was wrecked near Faro, Portugal. Her crew were rescued. She was on a voyage from Cardiff, Glamorgan to Constantinople, Ottoman Empire.
Justinian	United Kingdom	The ship was driven ashore at Harwich, Essex. She was subsequently refloated.
Olive Branch	United Kingdom	The ship was wrecked at Dungarvan, County Antrim.
Restitution	United Kingdom	The ship was sighted off Gibraltar whilst on a voyage from Odesa to Falmouth, Cornwall. No further trace, presumed foundered with the loss of all hands.
Tyne and Lochiel	United Kingdom	The ship was driven ashore at Cork.
Union	United Kingdom	The schooner was driven ashore and wrecked in Dundrum Bay. Her six crew were rescued. She was on a voyage from Whitehaven, Cumberland to Drogheda, County Louth.

== 22 January ==
List of shipwrecks: 22 January 1838
Ship	State	Description
Quartorze de Maio	Portugal	The ship was driven ashore and wrecked on Terceira Island, Azores, or near "Ereceira". She was on a voyage from Porto to Lisbon.

== 23 January ==
List of shipwrecks: 23 January 1838
Ship	State	Description
Alfred	United Kingdom	The ship was driven ashore in the Bay of Quick. She was on a voyage from Glasgow, Renfrewshire to a French port.
Alexander	Greece	The brig was destroyed by fire at Syra.
Brentford	United Kingdom	The sloop struck the Trinity Sand and sank off Grimsby, Lincolnshire with the loss of one of her three crew. She was on a voyage from London to Stockton-on-Tees, County Durham.
Brothers	United Kingdom	The ship foundered in the Atlantic Ocean with the loss of all hands.
Cumberland	United Kingdom	The steamship caught fire at New Orleans, Louisiana and was scuttled.
Chickashaw	United States	The steamship was damaged by fire at New Orleans.
David	United Kingdom	The ship was driven ashore in the Isles of Scilly. She was on a voyage from Cardiff, Glamorgan to London. David was later refloated, repaired and resumed her voyage.
Hope	United Kingdom	The ship was driven ashore near Belfast, County Antrim. She was on a voyage from Chepstow, Monmouthshire to Greenock, Renfrewshire.
Mamora	United States	The steamship was destroyed by fire at New Orleans.
Sovereign	United Kingdom	The sloop was wrecked off Stonehaven, Aberdeenshire. She was on a voyage from Harwich, Essex to Fraserburgh, Aberdeenshire.
Wye	United Kingdom	The ship ran aground and was damaged in St. Helen's Pool, Isles of Scilly. She was on a voyage from Cardiff to London. Wye was later refloated.

== 24 January ==
List of shipwrecks: 24 January 1838
Ship	State	Description
Agnes	United Kingdom	The barque was driven ashore at Falmouth, Cornwall.
Boyne	United Kingdom	The ship was wrecked at Skegness, Lincolnshire with the loss of three lives.
Brothers	United Kingdom	The ship foundered in the Atlantic Ocean with the loss of all hands.
Durance	France	The ship was driven ashore and wrecked at Mevagissey, Cornwall. Her crew were rescued. She was on a voyage from Saint Domingo to Havre de Grâce, Seine-Inférieure.
Europe	France	The ship was driven ashore in the Hamoaze. She was on a voyage from Saint Domingo to Havre de Grâce.
Falcon	United Kingdom	The ship was driven ashore near Cresswell, Northumberland. She was refloated in late March and taken into Blyth, Northumberland.
Harmony	United Kingdom	The collier was driven ashore and sank at Kingstown, County Dublin.
Margaret	United Kingdom	The ship was driven ashore at Warrenpoint, County Down.
Perseverance	France	The ship was wrecked in the Malouine Islands.
Princes Victoria	United Kingdom	The ship was driven ashore at Warrenpoint.
Stranger	United Kingdom	The ship was driven ashore in the Clay Hole, Lancashire.
Williams	United Kingdom	The ship was driven ashore at Warrenpoint. She was on a voyage from Chepstow, Monmouthshire to Belfast, County Antrim.

== 25 January ==
List of shipwrecks: 25 January 1838
Ship	State	Description
Brandywine Packet	United Kingdom	The brig was wrecked off Mevagissey, Cornwall with the loss of all but one of her nine crew. The survivor was wrescued by HMRC Fox ( Board of Customs). Brandywine was on a voyage from the Charente to London.
Favourite	United Kingdom	The ship was wrecked near Cape Bon, Algeria. Her crew were rescued. She was on a voyage from Naples and Sicily to Liverpool, Lancashire.
Helen McGregor	United Kingdom	The ship sprang a leak and was beached on South Uist, Outer Hebrides. She was on a voyage from Ardrossan, Ayrshire to Marseille, Bouches-du-Rhône, France.
Laura Maria	France	The ship was wrecked near "Nouvelle". Her crew were rescued. She was on a voyage from Bona, Algeria to Cette, Hérault.
Lykkens	Hamburg	The schooner was wrecked by ice at Hårup, Denmark. Her crew were rescued.
Margaret	United Kingdom	The ship was driven ashore and wrecked at Newry, County Antrim.
Theodore	United States	The brig was wrecked on the Luconia Shoals, in the South China Sea.

== 26 January ==
List of shipwrecks: 26 January 1838
Ship	State	Description
Seraphine	France	The ship was severely damaged by fire at Exmouth, Devon, United Kingdom. She was on a voyage from St. Ubes, Portugal to Boulogne-sur-Mer, Pas-de-Calais, France.
Stranger	United Kingdom	The ship was driven ashore at Cley-next-the-Sea, Norfolk.
Swan	United Kingdom	The ship was wrecked near Cape Bon, Algeria. Her crew were rescued.

== 27 January ==
List of shipwrecks: 27 January 1838
Ship	State	Description
Brandywine Packet	United Kingdom	The ship struck a rock off Mevagissey, Cornwall and sank with the loss of all but one of her crew.
Vigilant	United Kingdom	The ship was driven ashore and damaged in St. Helen's Pool, Isles of Scilly.

== 28 January ==
List of shipwrecks: 28 January 1838
Ship	State	Description
Lois	United Kingdom	The ship departed from Belize for Cork. No further trace, presumed foundered with the loss of all hands.

== 29 January ==
List of shipwrecks: 29 January 1838
Ship	State	Description
Carl Johan	Flag unknown	The ship foundered in the North Sea off the mouth of the Ythan.
Columbia	United Kingdom	The ship was abandoned in the Atlantic Ocean off the Outer Hebrides. All 34 people on board were rescued by Phenomene (Netherlands).
Hero	United Kingdom	The brig was driven ashore at Port Eynon, Glamorgan. Her crew were rescued. She was on a voyage from Chile to Swansea, Glamorgan.

== 30 January ==
List of shipwrecks: 30 January 1838
Ship	State	Description
Nayaden	Flag unknown	The ship was driven ashore and scuttled at South Shields, County Durham, United Kingdom.
Thomas and Emelia	United Kingdom	The ship departed from Havana, Cuba for Hamburg. No further trace, presumed foundered with the loss of all hands.

== 31 January ==
List of shipwrecks: 31 January 1838
Ship	State	Description
Henry	United Kingdom	The ship was driven ashore at Milford Haven, Pembrokeshire. She was on a voyage from Haverfordwest, Pembrokeshire to Bristol, Gloucestershire.
Ruthelia	United States	The ship was struck by lightning in the Atlantic Ocean (36°30′N 56°30′W) and consequently destroyed by fire. Her crew were rescued on 2 February by Chevalier Jonnet (France). Ruthelia was on a voyage from New Orleans, Louisiana to Liverpool, Lancashire, United Kingdom.

== Unknown date ==
List of shipwrecks: Unknown date in January 1838
Ship	State	Description
Amaranth	United Kingdom	The ship was wrecked on Mud Island, Michigan, United States. She was on a voyage from Shelburne, Nova Scotia, British North America to New York.
Amelia	(United Kingdom of Great Britain and Ireland) New South Wales	The schooner foundered off Cape Pillar, Van Diemen's Land. Her crew were rescued by Juliet ( (United Kingdom of Great Britain and Ireland) New South Wales). Amelia was on a voyage from Hobart, Van Diemen's Land to Sydney.
Brunswick	United Kingdom	The ship was driven ashore at Lamlash, Isle of Arran. She was on a voyage from Greenock, Renfrewshire to Lisbon, Portugal. Brunswick was refloated on 12 January and taken into Troon, Ayrshire.
Cresswell	United Kingdom	The ship was driven ashore at Walton-on-the-Naze, Essex. She was on a voyage from Sunderland, County Durham to London. Cresswell was later refloated and taken into Harwich, Essex.
Earl Johann	Hamburg	The ship foundered in the North Sea. She was on a voyage from Cardiff, Glamorgan, United Kingdom to Hamburg.
Earl of Hopetoun	United Kingdom	The schooner was abandoned in the North Sea. She was on a voyage from Leith, Lothian to London. Earl of Hopetoun was later towed into Grimsby, Lincolnshire.
Edouard	France	The ship was driven ashore and wrecked at Saint Domingo before 9 January.
Frances	United Kingdom	The ship was driven ashore near Gallipoli, Ottoman Empire. She was on a voyage from Palermo, Sicily to Gallipoli.
Goodluck	United Kingdom	The ship was driven ashore near Marsala, Sicily before 10 January. She was on a voyage from Kerch, Russia to London. Goodluck was later refloated and taken into Marsala for repairs.
Isabella	United Kingdom	The ship was driven ashore near Llanelly Dock, Glamorgan. She was on a voyage from Falmouth, Cornwall to Llanelly.
Louise Maria	Bremen	The schooner was driven ashore on Amrum, Duchy of Schleswig. Her crew survived. She was on a voyage from Sunderland to Bremen.
Lyra	United Kingdom	The snow was driven ashore in the Black Sea. Her crew were rescued by the steamship Nicholas (Russia). Lyra was on a voyage from the Bosphorus to Odesa.
Margaret Littlejohn	United Kingdom	The ship was wrecked near Islay, Inner Hebrides.
Napoleon	United Kingdom	The ship was driven ashore near Cowes, Isle of Wight. She was on a voyage from London to Africa. Napoleon was later refloated and put into Portsmouth, Hampshire.
Sarah	United Kingdom	The ship foundered off Aberdeen in late January.
Shakespeare	United Kingdom	The ship was wrecked on the Head Sand. Her crew were rescued by the South Shields Lifeboat. She was on a voyage from South Shields, County Durham to London.
The Happy Return	United Kingdom	The ship foundered in the North Sea off the coast of Northumberland in late January.
Trio	United Kingdom	The ship was driven ashore in the Black Sea. Her crew were rescued.
Triumfo	Portugal	The hiate departed from Faial Island for São Miguel Island. No further trace, presumed foundered with the loss of all hands.
Venus	United Kingdom	The ship foundered off Sanday, Orkney on or before 25 January.
