= HMS Acheron (1838) =

Sloop of the Royal Navy

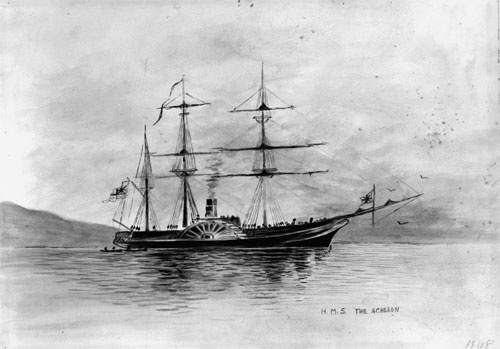
- Acheron in New Zealand

History

United Kingdom
- Name: HMS Acheron
- Ordered: 15 September 1837
- Builder: Sheerness dockyard
- Cost: £25,509
- Laid down: October 1837
- Launched: 23 August 1838
- Commissioned: 8 January 1839
- Fate: Survey ship, 1847; Sold at Sydney, 23 April 1855

General characteristics
- Type: Paddle sloop
- Displacement: 1,006 tons
- Tons burthen: 715 43/94 bm
- Length: 150 ft 0 in (45.7 m) gundeck; 128 ft 0 in (39.0 m) keel for tonnage
- Beam: 32 ft 9 in (10.0 m) maximum; 32 ft 5 in (9.9 m) for tonnage
- Draught: 11 ft 6 in (3.5 m) (forward); 12 ft 0 in (3.7 m) (aft)
- Depth of hold: 17 ft 0 in (5.2 m)
- Installed power: 160 nominal horsepower
- Propulsion: 2-cylinder side lever steam engine; Paddles
- Sail plan: 3-masted barque
- Complement: 135
- Armament: As built: 2 × 9-pounder (13 1/2 cwt) brass guns; From 1842: 1 × 8-inch (52 cwt) pivot gun; 2 × 32-pounder (17 cwt) carronades

HMS Acheron was the last Hermes-class wooden paddle sloop ordered for the Royal Navy. She was launched at Sheerness in 1838. She spent two commissions in the Mediterranean before being reclassed as a survey ship in 1847. Between 1848 and 1851 she made a coastal survey of New Zealand, the first such survey since Captain Cook. She was paid off at Sydney and was tender to HMS Calliope. She was sold at Sydney in 1855.

Acheron was the second named vessel since it was used for an 8-gun Bomb, purchased in October 1803 then captured by the French in the Mediterranean and burnt on 3 February 1805.

== Construction ==
She was initially ordered from Chatham Dockyard on 15 September 1837, but three days later this was changed to Sheerness Dockyard because the relevant tooling was already present there. The Vessel was named on 27 September and laid down in October. She was launched on 23 August 1838. She was completed for sea at Sheerness om 8 January 1839 at a first cost of 25,509 (including 16,819 for and rigging and 8,690 for machinery). (Note: A total cost accounting for inflation of approximately £2,445,100 in 2010.)

== Commissioned service ==
=== First commission ===
She was commissioned on 27 November 1838 under the command of Lieutenant Andrew Kennedy, RN for the Mediterranean. She returned to Home Waters, paying off in December 1841.

=== Second commission ===
Her second commission commenced on 3 December 1842 under the command of Lieutenant Benjamin Alpin, RN for the Mediterranean. On 10 September 1846 Lieutenant Andrew Robert Dunlap took command. She returned to Home Waters and paid off at Woolwich on 13 October 1847.

=== Commissioned as survey ship ===
Acheron was commissioned the next day on 14 October 1847, under the command of Captain John Lort Stokes, RN, for service on the East Indies Station as a survey ship. She was dispatched to New Zealand in January 1849, arriving in November the same year. In March 1851, due to a budget cut to the Hydrographer of the Navy, Acheron was ordered to be laid up in Sydney, New South Wales and her crew returned to England. However, in November 1851, she was sent to rescue the passengers and crew of the British merchant ship Syrian, which had run aground on the Elizabeth Reef whilst on a voyage from Wellington, New Zealand to Sydney. In July 1853, she rescued the passengers and crew of the British barque Tory, which had been wrecked north of Port Stephens, New South Wales.

== Disposition ==
Acheron was sold at Sydney on 23 April 1855 for £2,067 16s.
