= HMS Volcano (1836) =

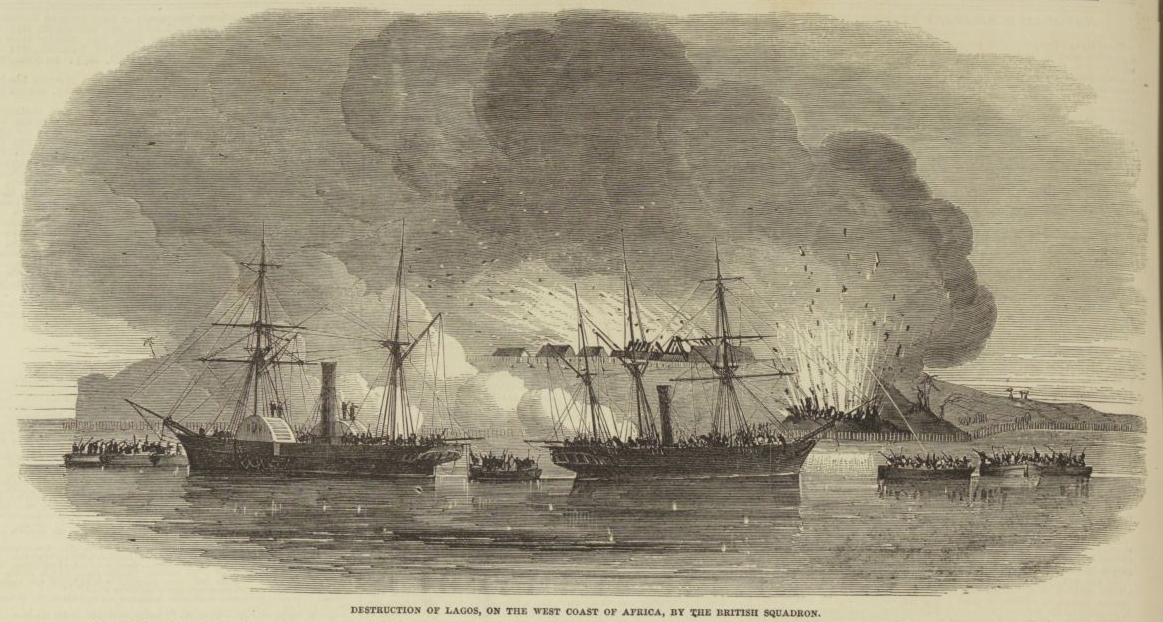

History

United Kingdom
- Name: HMS Volcano
- Ordered: 19 November 1834
- Builder: Royal Dockyard, Portsmouth
- Cost: £27,884
- Laid down: July 1835
- Launched: 30 June 1836
- Completed: 17 January 1837
- Commissioned: December 1836
- Honours and awards: China 1856 - 60
- Fate: Sold for breaking November 1894

General characteristics
- Type: Paddle sloop
- Displacement: 1,006 tons
- Tons burthen: 720 49/94 bm
- Length: 150 ft 8 in (45.9 m) gundeck; 128 ft 7.875 in (39.2 m) keel for tonnage
- Beam: 32 ft 9.375 in (10.0 m) maximum; 32 ft 5.375 in (9.9 m) for tonnage
- Draught: 11 ft 6 in (3.5 m) (forward); 12 ft 0 in (3.7 m) (aft)
- Depth of hold: 18 ft 0.5 in (5.5 m)
- Installed power: 140 nominal horsepower
- Propulsion: 2-cylinder side lever steam engine; Paddles
- Sail plan: 3-masted barque rigged; Brig sailing rig - 1857
- Complement: 135
- Armament: As built: 2 × 9-pounder (13 1/2 cwt) brass guns; From 1842: 1 × 8-inch (52 cwt) pivot gun; 2 × 32-pounder (17 cwt) carronades

HMS Volcano was a Hermes-class wooden paddle sloop of the Royal Navy. She was built at Portsmouth Dockyard. She was launched in 1836. Her first few commissions were on packet service in the Mediterranean and North American and West Indies Stations and on the anti-slavery patrol on the West Coast of Africa. In 1854 she was converted to a factory ship and served in the Baltic during the Russian War. She was sent to China during the Second Opium War as a factory ship. On her return she was assigned to Portsmouth, on Harbour Service as a stationary factory ship. She remained there until sold for breaking in 1894.

Volcano was the sixth named vessel since it was used for an 8-gun Fireship, purchased 1778, commissioned 31 July 1778 and sold 7 May 1781.

== Construction ==
Ordered on 19 November 1834 from Portsmouth Dockyard, she was laid down in July 1835. She was launched on 30 June 1836. She was completed for sea at Woolwich between 8 October 1836 and 17 January 1837 at a cost of £27,884 (Note: A total cost accounting for inflation of approximately £2,672,700 in today's money.) including £17,011 for her hull and £8,875 for her machinery.

== Commissioned Service ==
=== First Commission ===
She was commissioned in December 1836 under the command of Lieutenant William M'Uwaine, RN for service on the Mediterranean packet service. On 14 May 1838 Lieutenant Joseph West, RN took command. In 1840 she was assigned to the North America and West Indies packet service. She returned to Home Waters paying off on 16 March 1841.

=== Second Commission ===
She was recommissioned seven days later still under Lieutenant West. On 2 December 1841 Lieutenant Craven John Featherstone, RN took command. On 6 April 1844 Lieutenant Edward Charles Miller, RN took command. Lieutenant Miller died on 29 September 1845 and Lieutenant John Hay Craig, RN took command on 1 October for service in the Mediterranean. She returned to Home Waters paying off on 16 February 1849. She was repaired and fitted for sea at Woolwich then Deptford for £9,628. (Note: A cost accounting for inflation of approximately £922,900 in today's money.)

=== Third Commission ===
She was commissioned on 6 December 1850 under Commander William Thomas Rivers, RN at Devonport for the West Coast of Africa. On 21 April 1851 Commander Robert Coote, RN took command. She joined the reduction of Lagos on 25 November 1851. She returned to Home Waters and paid off at Woolwich on 30 January 1854. At Woolwich Dockyard she was fitted as a depot ship, also known as an Engineer's Workshop, Steam Smithery or Floating Factory. The conversion cost £6,054 (Note: A cost accounting for inflation of approximately £580,300 in today's money.) plus another £2,565. (Note: A cost accounting for inflation of approximately £245,900 in today's money.)

=== First Commission as Floating Factory ship ===
She was commissioned under Robert Dyer, Master for service in the Baltic during the Russian War on 16 June 1854. On 27 February she was under the command of James H. Ryan, Second Master. At the end of the Russian war she was paid off in 1856. She underwent repairs and a refit at Portsmouth including new boilers, Her hull was recoppered, the fore part of the ship was rebuilt and she was given a brig sailing rig completing in 1857.

=== Second Commission as Floating Factory ship ===
She was commissioned on 17 March 1857 under John M Hockly, Master for the East Indies and China. She was at Canton and Hong Kong between 1857 and 1859. She returned to Home Waters paying off at Portsmouth into the Steam Reserve on 25 May 1859.

== Disposition ==
HMS Volcano was reduced to Harbour Service in 1862. She remained in Portsmouth until sold to Sidney Castle & Son in November 1894 for breaking at Charlton.
