= HMS Hermes (1835) =

Sloop of the Royal Navy

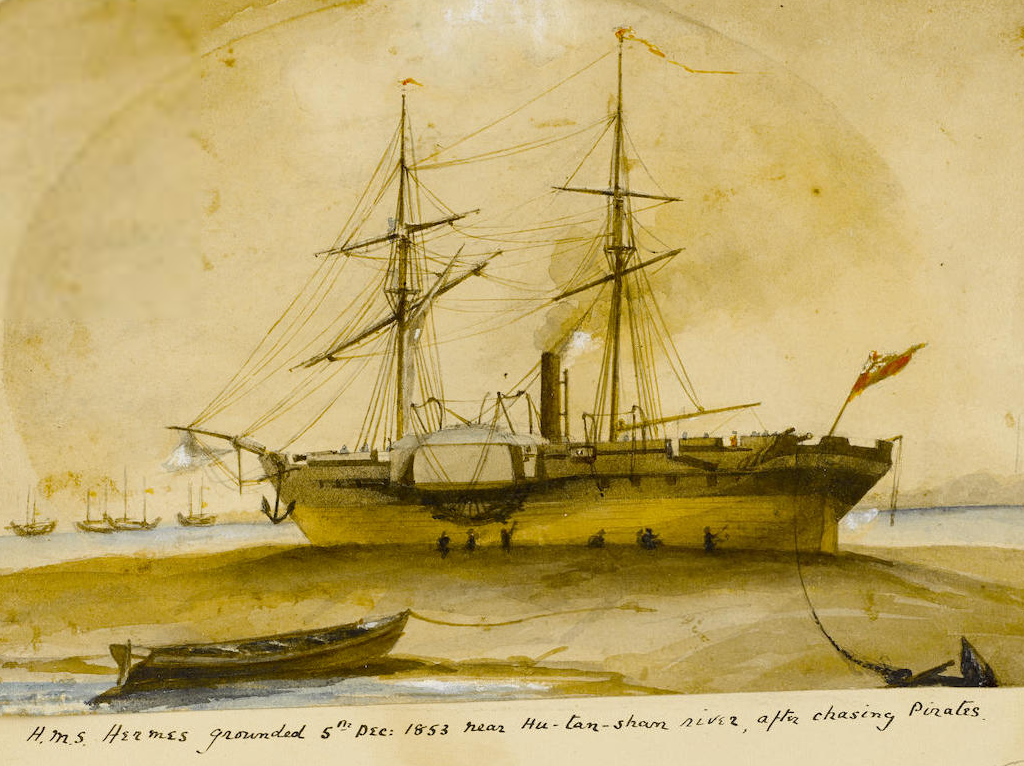
- HMS Hermes grounded 5 December 1853 near Hu-tan-shan river, after chasing Pirates 1853

History

United Kingdom
- Name: HMS Hermes
- Ordered: 22 January 1834
- Builder: Royal Dockyard, Portsmouth
- Cost: £24,452
- Laid down: April 1834
- Launched: 26 June 1835
- Completed: 25 November 1835
- Commissioned: November 1835
- Honours and awards: Second Burmese War 1852
- Fate: Sold for breaking October 1864

General characteristics
- Class & type: Paddle sloop
- Displacement: 1,006 tons
- Tons burthen: as built 720 49/94 bm; lengthened 1842 830 32/94 bm
- Length: as built; 150 ft 0 in (45.72 m) gundeck; 128 ft 0 in (39.01 m) keel for tonnage; lengthened 1842; 170 ft 0 in (51.82 m) gundeck; 147 ft 9.5 in (45.047 m) keel for tonnage
- Beam: 32 ft 9 in (9.98 m) Maximum; 32 ft 5 in (9.88 m) for tonnage
- Draught: 11 ft 6 in (3.51 m) forward; 12 ft 0 in (3.66 m) aft
- Depth of hold: as built; 17 ft 0 in (5.18 m); lengthened 1842; 18 ft 2 in (5.54 m)
- Installed power: 140 nominal horsepower
- Propulsion: Two-cylinder VSE steam engine
- Sail plan: barque rigged
- Speed: 10.75 kn (19.91 km/h) under power
- Armament: As built: 2 × 9-pounder (13 1/2 cwt) brass guns; From 1842: 1 × 8-inch (52 cwt) pivot gun; 2 × 32-pounder (17 cwt) carronades

HMS Hermes was a Hermes-class wooden paddle sloop of the Royal Navy. She was built at Portsmouth Dockyard. Initially she was used as apackey vessel until her guns were upgraded. She was re-engined and lengthened in 1842 to 43. She spent time on various stations in the Empire. She participated in the storming of Rangoon during the Second Burmese War. She was sold for breaking in October 1864.

Hermes was the sixth named vessel since it was used for a 12-gun brig sloop, captured from the Dutch (Mercurius) by Sylph at Texel on 12 May 1596 and foundered in January 1797.

== Construction ==
She was ordered on 22 January 1834 from Portsmouth Dockyard. Her keel was laid in April 1834 and launch just over a year later on 25 June 1835. She was initially fitted with Morgan type paddle wheels, however, these were changed in 1838 to cycloidal wheels at Woolwich. She was completed for sea between September and 25 November 1835. Her first cost was £24,452. (Note: A total cost accounting for inflation of approximately £2,343,800 in today's money.)

== Commissioned Service ==
=== First Commission ===
She was commissioned in November 1835 under the command of Lieutenant William Simpson Blount, RN for the Mediterranean packet service. She was fitted with the Cycloidal paddle wheels at Woolwich between April and July 1838 then resumed her service on the Mediterranean packet service.

=== 1840 to 43 Refit ===
In 1840 she returned to Home Waters for a refit on 30 March 1840. Her engines and boilers were removed between March and May at Woolwich. She was paid off at Woolwich on 5 October 1840. She was towed to Chatham to have her bow lengthened by twenty feet at a cost of £9,037. This work was completed from November 1841 completing in November 1842. Her gundeck was now 170 feet 0 inches (51.82 metres) with the keel measurement for tonnage at 147 feet 9.5 inches (45.05 metres). Her breadth increased by one inch with her depth of hold increasing to 18 feet 2 inches (5.54 metres). Her builder's measure calculation increased to 827 88/94 tons. Upon completion she was towed back to Woolwich to have her machinery fitted. Starting in December she has a 220 nominal horsepower Maudslay 4-cylinder 'Siamese' engine and new boilers installed at a cost of £11,225. Her speed under steam power increased to 8.5 knots. She was then moved to Chatham to finish completing for sea at a cost of £3,303. At this time her guns were changed.

=== Second Commission ===
She commissioned on 30 May 1843 under the command of Lieutenant Washington Carr, RN for service on the North America and West Indies Station. She returned to Home Waters, paying off at Chatham on 26 October 1847.

=== Third Commission ===
Her third commission commenced on 7 January 1850 under the command of Commander Edmund Gardiner Fishbourne, RN for service on the Cape of Good Hope Station. She soon moved on to the East Indies and China Station. during 1852 she was involved with Second Burmese War, She was in action in May on the Bassein River. In April 1853 she was at Nanling. She ran aground on 5 December 1853 near Hu-tan-shan river, after chasing Pirates. She returned to Home Waters paying off into the Steam Reserve at Woolwich on 10 June 1854.

=== Fourth Commission ===
Her last commission started on 13 June 1855 under the command of Commander Henry Coryton, RN for service on the North American and West Indies Station.

On 21 February 1856, Commander William E.A. Gordon, RN took command and was assigned to the Cape of Good Hope Station. They first visited Sydney and Halifax in Nova Scotia before making their way down to Bermuda, and then on to the Caribbean and the West Indies.

In August 1856 while in Jamaica, the muster rolls for Hermes show several of her crew as being discharged dead, which included the Ship Surgeon, John Ward, Assistant Surgeon Henry Cox as well as the Paymaster and Assistant Engineer, amongst others. This rather suggests it was something like an outbreak of cholera, smallpox or a tropical disease which had taken hold on board, as several of the crew died within a few weeks of each other and it also left Hermes with no medical officer.

Hermes returned to Home Waters paying off at Sheerness on 8 June 1860.

== Disposition ==
She was sold to Castle & Beech in October 1864 for breaking at Charlton.
