= Russian ship of the line Vola =

Soviet Royal Naval vessel

History

Russian Empire
- Name: Vola
- Namesake: The Warsaw suburb of Wola captured by the Imperial Russian Army in 1831 during the November Uprising
- Builder: New Admiralty Shipyard, St. Petersburg
- Laid down: 23 October 1835 (Note: All dates used in this article are Old Style)
- Launched: 30 July 1837
- In service: 1839
- Stricken: 26 August 1871

General characteristics (as built)
- Type: 84-gun ship of the line
- Length: 196 ft (59.7 m) (p/p)
- Beam: 51 ft (15.5 m)
- Depth of hold: 23 ft 7 in (7.2 m)
- Complement: 779 men
- Armament: 6 × 12-pounder guns; 32 × long 24-pounder guns; 26 × 24-pounder carronades; 28 × long 36-pounder guns; 4 × 60-pounder licornes

General characteristics (rebuilt as a steamer)
- Displacement: 3,814 long tons (3,875 t)
- Length: 212 ft (64.6 m) (p/p)
- Beam: 53 ft 8 in (16.4 m)
- Draft: 23 ft 1 in (7.0 m)
- Installed power: 500 Nominal horsepower; 4 boilers
- Propulsion: 1 Steam engine
- Speed: 9 knots (17 km/h; 10 mph)
- Armament: 16 × 30-pounder howitzerss; 32 × short 30-pounder guns; 8 × long 30-pounder guns; 26 × 60-pounder shell guns

Vola (Russian: Вола) was an 84-gun Imperatritsa Aleksandra-class ship of the line built for the Imperial Russian Navy in the mid-1830s. The ship was assigned to the Baltic Fleet for her entire career. She was one of the ships deployed to Denmark during the First Schleswig War of 1848–50 to help preserve Denmark's territorial integrity against Prussia. The ship was converted to steam power in 1854–57 and cruised the Baltic Sea in 1857–61 before she was placed in ordinary. Vola was stricken from the navy list in 1871 and sold for scrap.

== Description ==
Vola was 196 feet (59.7 m) long between perpendiculars, with a beam of 51 feet (15.5 m) and a depth of hold of 23 feet 7 inches (7.2 m). As built she was armed with a variety of smoothbore guns: On the forecastle and quarterdeck, the ship was fitted with six 12-pounder guns and twenty-six 24-pounder carronades. On her upper deck, she carried 32 long 24-pounder guns and, on her lower deck, Vola was fitted with 28 long 36-pounder guns and four 60-pounder licornes. In 1840 she was rearmed with 32 long 24-pounder guns on the middle deck and six 9.65-inch (245 mm) shell guns, 28 long 36-pounders and four 60-pounder licornes on her lower deck. On her quarterdeck and forecastle, Vola was now armed with six 24-pounder gunnades and fourteen 24-pounder carronades. Her crew numbered 779 officers and enlisted men.

In 1854–56, Vola was rebuilt and converted to steam with a steam engine of 500 nominal horsepower built by Nobel of St. Petersburg that drove a single propeller shaft. Steam was provided by four boilers and she had a maximum speed of 9 knots (17 km/h; 10 mph). Enlarged to accommodate the steam engine and its boilers, she displaced 3,814 long tons (3,875 t) and the ship measured 2,659 tons bm. She now measured 212 feet (64.6 m) between perpendiculars, her beam was increased to 53 feet 8 inches (16.4 m) and her depth of hold was increased to 23 feet 8 inches (7.2 m). Forward her draft measured 21 feet 7 inches (6.6 m) and 23 feet 1 inch (7.0 m) aft. Vola was also rearmed when her reconstruction was complete. The ship now carried four short 30-pounder guns and sixteen 30-pounder howitzers on her quarterdeck and forecastle, four long and 28 short 30-pounder guns on her upper deck, and twenty-six 60-pounder shell guns and four long 30-pounder guns on her lower deck.

== Career ==
Vola, named after the Warsaw suburb of Wola captured by the Imperial Russian Army in 1831 during the November Uprising, was laid down on 23 October 1835 at the New Admiralty Shipyard in St. Petersburg. The ship was launched on 30 July 1837 and cruised the Baltic in 1839–43 and 1846–47. She sailed to Denmark, along with most of the Baltic Fleet, to show the flag during the First Schleswig War between Denmark, Sweden and Prussia. Tsar Nicholas I was determined to support the integrity of Denmark so he deployed a large force in Danish waters for the duration of the war, although it did not actively participate in the war.

Vola was rebuilt as a screw ship of the line between 1 June 1854 and 26 October 1856. She cruised the Baltic for the next four years before she was laid up. The ship was stricken from the naval list on 26 August 1871 and subsequently scrapped.
