= HMS Megaera (1837) =

Ship of the Royal Navy

History

United Kingdom
- Name: HMS Megaera
- Ordered: 19 November 1834
- Builder: Royal Dockyard, Sheerness
- Cost: £27,778
- Laid down: August 1836
- Launched: 17 August 1837
- Completed: 30 March 1838
- Commissioned: 13 December 1837
- Fate: Wrecked Jamaica 4 March 1843

General characteristics
- Type: Paddle sloop
- Displacement: 1,006 tons
- Tons burthen: 715 43/94 bm
- Length: 150 ft 0 in (45.7 m) gundeck; 128 ft 0 in (39.0 m) keel for tonnage
- Beam: 32 ft 9 in (10.0 m) maximum; 32 ft 5 in (9.9 m) for tonnage
- Draught: 11 ft 6 in (3.5 m) (forward); 12 ft 0 in (3.7 m) (aft)
- Depth of hold: 17 ft 0 in (5.2 m)
- Installed power: 140 nominal horsepower
- Propulsion: 2-cylinder side lever steam engine; Paddles
- Sail plan: 3-masted barque rigged
- Complement: 135
- Armament: As built: 2 × 9-pounder (13 1/2 cwt) brass guns; From 1842: 1 × 8-inch (52 cwt) pivot gun; 2 × 32-pounder (17 cwt) carronades

HMS Megaera was a Hermes-class wooden paddle sloop of the Royal Navy. She was built at Sheerness Dockyard. She was launched in 1837 and served two commissions before being wrecked at Jamaica in 1843.

Megaera was the second named vessel since it was used for a 14-gun Fireship, launched by Teague of Ipswich in May 1783 and sold to J. Darkin on 3 April 1817.

== Construction ==
She was ordered on 19 November 1834 to be built at Sheerness Dockyard. She was laid down in August 1836 and launched on 17 August 1837. She was towed to Limehouse for the fitting of her machinery starting on 6 October 1837 and completing on 13 February 1838 then towed back to Sheerness. She was completed for sea at Sheerness on 30 March 1838 at a cost of £27,778 (Note: A total cost accounting for inflation of approximately £2,662,600 in today's money for Magaera.) including £15,161 for the hull and £8,983 for the machinery.

== Commissioned service ==
=== First commission ===
She was commissioned on 13 December 1837 under the command of Lieutenant Hugh Coville Goldsmith, RN for service as a packet vessel in the Mediterranean. She returned to Home waters. paying off in October 1841. Lieutenant Goldsmith died on 8 October 1841. At this point she underwent a refit starting at Limehouse, then continuing at Woolwich and finally completing at Deptford from March to December 1842. During the refit she had her boilers replaced, a smoke consuming apparatus was fitted and her armament was probably changed.

=== Second commission ===
On 10 November 1842 she was commissioned under the command of Lieutenant George Oldmixon, RN for service on the North America and West Indies Station.

== Loss ==
On 4 March 1843 she was wrecked on Bare Bush Key (off Port Royal), Jamaica.
