= George Collier (steamboat) =

The George Collier was a Mississippi River steamboat built in 1835. On May 6, 1839, while steaming from New Orleans to St. Louis, her boilers exploded about 80 miles (130 km) south of Natchez, killing 26 passengers and severely injuring another 20 more. Apparently the cause of the explosion was a faulty piston rod "which broke the forward cylinder-head, and carried away a part of the boiler-stands."

This George Collier is not to be confused with the Mississippi steamboat called George Collier that burned at Memphis, Tennessee, in 1855, with a loss of 10 to 12 lives.
