= Lucinda (1835 ship) =

History

United Kingdom
- Owner: John Wilson & Co.
- Builder: Yarmouth
- Launched: 1835
- Fate: Wrecked 20 January 1838

General characteristics
- Tons burthen: 404 (bm)
- Complement: 29

Lucinda was a whaling ship launched at Yarmouth in 1835. She sailed from London on 9 December 1835 bound for the Pacific. She struck an unknown reef about 75 miles East by North from the NW end of Caledonia. Captain Thomas James and the 29 members of his crew took to four boats. Success, of Moreton Bay, rescued them and brought them to Sydney. At the time she was lost, Lucinda had 1500 barrels of sperm oil on board, all of which was lost.
