= Manchester (1835 ship) =

History

United Kingdom
- Builder: Portland, New Brunswick
- Launched: 1835
- Fate: Foundered 2 August 1839

General characteristics
- Tons burthen: 646 (bm)

Manchester was launched in 1835 at Portland, New Brunswick, and was registered at St John, New Brunswick. She first appeared in Lloyd's Register (LR) in 1837. She changed her registration to Liverpool, and foundered in 1839 while sailing from Bombay to Liverpool.

Year	Master	Owner	Trade	Homeport	Source
1837	Drenning	Willmot	Liverpool–New Orleans	St Johns	LR
1839	F.Wilson	Anderson	Liverpool–Bombay	Liverpool	LR

Manchester, Frederick Wilson, master, left Bombay on 16 July 1839, with a cargo of cotton, and bound for Liverpool. On 29 July she developed a leak. When the pumps could not cope with the incoming water, her 29 passengers and crew abandoned her in the Indian Ocean (1°47′N 84°40′E) and took to her boats on 2 August. The men set a course for Ceylon, but on 4 August they realized that they could not reach there and instead made for Penang. The longboat with Wilson and 19 others reached Penang on 22 September. Thomas Coutts rescued the other nine, who had taken to the jolly boat.

The LR issue for 1839 has the annotation "foundered" by Manchester's name.
