= Hermes-class sloop =

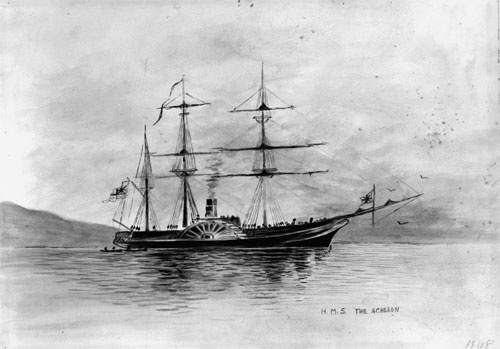
- Acheron in New Zealand

Class overview
- Name: Hermes-class paddle sloop
- Builders: Portsmouth Dockyard; Sheerness Dockyard
- Operators: Royal Navy
- Preceded by: HMS Medea
- Succeeded by: HMS Gorgon
- Built: 1834–1839
- In commission: 1835–1864
- Completed: 4
- Lost: 1
- Retired: 3

General characteristics
- Type: Paddle sloop
- Displacement: 1,006 tons
- Tons burthen: 715 43/94 bm
- Length: 150 ft 0 in (45.7 m) gundeck; 128 ft 0 in (39.0 m) keel for tonnage
- Beam: 32 ft 9 in (10.0 m) maximum; 32 ft 5 in (9.9 m) for tonnage
- Draught: 11 ft 6 in (3.5 m) (forward); 12 ft 0 in (3.7 m) (aft)
- Depth of hold: 17 ft 0 in (5.2 m)
- Installed power: 140 nominal horsepower (160 in Acheron)
- Propulsion: 2-cylinder side lever steam engine; Paddles
- Sail plan: 3-masted barque rigged
- Complement: 135
- Armament: As built: 2 × 9-pounder (13 1/2 cwt) brass guns; From 1842: 1 × 8-inch (52 cwt) pivot gun; 2 × 32-pounder (17 cwt) carronades

The Hermes class were a group of four vessels designed by John Edye of the Surveyor's Department to specifications outlined by Captain William Symonds, the Surveyor of the Navy. The design was approved in 1834. The vessels would be powered by a 140 nominal horsepower engine and carry an armament of two brass 9-pounder guns. The ships would be built in three Royal Dockyards (Portsmouth, Chatham and Sheerness), however, the Chatham vessel was transferred to Sheerness in 1837 prior to being laid down. Hermes was re-engined and lengthen in 1842, Megaera was wrecked in Jamaica in 1843. the remaining vessels served on many different stations of the Empire. Acheron was sold in 1855, Hermes went to the Breakers in 1864 and Volcano lasted until 1894.

Acheron was the second named vessel since it was used for an 8-gun Bomb, purchased in October 1803 then captured by the French in the Mediterranean and burnt on 3 February 1805.

Hermes was the sixth named vessel since it was used for a 12-gun brig sloop, captured from the Dutch (Mercurius) by Sylph at Texel on 12 May 1596 and foundered in January 1797.

Megaera was the second named vessel since it was used for a 14-gun Fireship, launched by Teague of Ipswich in May 1783 and sold to J. Darkin on 3 April 1817.

Volcano was the sixth named vessel since it was used for an 8-gun Fireship, purchased 1778, commissioned 31 July 1778 and sold 7 May 1781.

== Design and specifications ==
The first three vessels were ordered in 1834 with last one in 1837. the ships were laid down at the rate of one per year between 1834 and 1837 with first pair at Portsmouth and the second pair at Sheerness. The first was launched in 1835 and the last in 1838. The gundeck was 150 feet 0 inches (45.72 metres) with the keel length of 125 feet 0 inches (38.10 metres) reported for tonnage. The maximum beam was 32 feet 9 inches (9.98 metres) with 32 feet 5 inches (9.88 metres) reported for tonnage. The depth of hold was 17 feet 0 inches (5.18 metres). The light draught forward was 11 feet 6 inches (3.51 metres) and 12 feet 0 inches (3.66 metres) aft. The builder's measure was calculated at 715 43/94 tons whereas the vessels displaced 1,006 tons.

In 1842 Hermes underwent an engine change. During that process her hull was lengthened. Upon completion her gundeck was now 170 feet 0 inches (51.82 metres) with 148 feet 1.25 inches (45.14 metres) for keel reported for tonnage. Her breadth remained at 32 feet 9 inches (9.98 metres) at maximum with 32 feet 5 inches (9.88 metres) reported for tonnage. Her depth of hold increased to 18 feet 2 inches (5.54 metres) with her builder's measured tonnage calculated at 827 88/94 tons.

The machinery for Acheron, Volcano and Megaera was supplied by Seaward and Capel and Hermes was supplied by the Butterley Company of Derbyshire. All vessels were equipped with two fire-tube rectangular boilers. All engines were basically 2-cylinder vertical single expansion (VSE) side-lever steam engines rated at 140 nominal horsepower (NHP) except Acheron which was rated at 160 NHP. Hermes was originally fitted with Morgan's paddle wheels from the original Hermes of 1830. In 1838 she was fitted with cycloidal paddle wheels. Hermes had her original engine removed at Woolwich in 1840, and after which she was lengthened, in 1843 a new Maudslay 220 nominal horsepower 'Siamese'-type steam engine was fitted. This gave her a speed under power of about 8 1/2 knots (15.7 km/h). Pictures show Acheron with a barque rig.

All four ships were initially armed with two 9-pounder (13 1/2 hundredweight (cwt)) (muzzle-loading smooth bore MLSB) brass guns. Between 1842 and 1843 they were re-armed with one 8-inch 52 cwt muzzle loading shell gun on a pivot mount and two 32-pounder (17 cwt) carronades. (Note: "cwt", or "hundredweight" refers to the weight of the gun itself. "32-pounder" refers to the weight of the ball fired) They had a complement of approximately 135 men.

== Initial cost of vessels ==
- Acheron: Total Cost £25,509 (Hull - £16,819; Machinery - £8,690) (Note: A total cost accounting for inflation of approximately £2,901,100 in today's money for Acheron.)
- Hermes: Total Cost £24,452 (Note: A total cost accounting for inflation of approximately £2,780,900 in today's money for Hermes.)
- Megaera Total Cost: £27,778 (Hull - £15,161; machinery - £8,983; fitting - £3,634) (Note: A total cost accounting for inflation of approximately £3,159,200 in today's money for Magaera.)
- Volcano Total Cost: £27,884 (hull - £17,011; machinery - £8,875; fitting - £1,867) (Note: A total cost accounting for inflation of approximately £3,171,200 in today's money for Volcano.)

== Ships ==
Name	Ship builder	Laid down	Launched	Commissioned	Fate
Hermes	Portsmouth Dockyard	April 1834	26 June 1835	25 November 1835	Sold for breaking October 1864
Volcano	Portsmouth Dockyard	July 1835	30 June 1836	17 January 1837	Engineers' workshop at Portsmouth from 1854; broken up at Portsmouth in 1894
Megaera	Sheerness Dockyard	August 1836	17 August 1837	30 March 1838	Wrecked on Bare Bush Key, 5 miles east of Portland Point, Jamaica, 4 March 1843
Acheron	Sheerness Dockyard	October 1837	23 August 1838	8 January 1839	Sold at Sydney in 1855
