= List of shipwrecks in January 1842 =

The list of shipwrecks in January 1842 includes ships sunk, foundered, wrecked, grounded, or otherwise lost during January 1842.

== 1 January ==
List of shipwrecks: 1 January 1842
Ship	State	Description
Hercule	France	The ship struck the Pearl Rock, in the Strait of Gibraltar and was damaged. She was on a voyage from Marseille, Bouches-du-Rhône to Bristol, Gloucestershire, United Kingdom. She was subsequently escorted into Gibraltar.
Louisa Maria	France	The ship was driven ashore at Buenos Aires, Argentina.
Palestine	United Kingdom	The ship was driven ashore 1 nautical mile (1.9 km) south of Filey, Yorkshire. She was on a voyage from Sunderland, County Durham to King's Lynn, Norfolk. She was later refloated and resumed her voyage.
Susan	(United Kingdom of Great Britain and Ireland) Guernsey	The schooner caught fire in the North Sea. She was towed into Sunderland, County Durham by London Merchant (United Kingdom).
Wilhelmine	Norway	The ship was wrecked on the Bacili Rocks, in the Adriatic Sea off Hvar, Austrian Empire. She was on a voyage from Norway to Trieste.

== 2 January ==
List of shipwrecks: 2 January 1842
Ship	State	Description
HMS Avon	Royal Navy	The paddle steamer caught fire in the Irish Sea 20 nautical miles (37 km) off the Tuskar Rock. the fire was extinguished with assistance from Jenny Jones (United Kingdom). HMS Avon put into Milford Haven, Pembrokeshire.

== 3 January ==
List of shipwrecks: 3 January 1842
Ship	State	Description
John and Mary	United Kingdom	The ship capsized at Padstow, Cornwall.
Juliane	Hamburg	The schooner was abandoned in the English Channel 5 leagues (15 nautical miles (28 km)) off the Eddystone Lighthouse, Cornwall. Her crew were rescued before she sank. She was on a voyage from Jersey to Gibraltar.

== 4 January ==
List of shipwrecks: 4 January 1842
Ship	State	Description
Astrea	United Kingdom	The brigantine was wrecked off Boa Vista, Cape Verde. Her crew were rescued. She was on a voyage from Liverpool, Lancashire to Montevideo, Uruguay.
Donaldson	United Kingdom	The ship ran aground and sank on the Woolpack Sand, in the North Sea. Her crew were rescued.
Echo	United Kingdom	The ship was driven ashore south of Great Yarmouth, Norfolk. Her crew were rescued. She was on a voyage from Perth to London.
Henry Davis	United Kingdom	The ship ran aground on the Burnham Flats, Norfolk and sank. Her crew were rescued. She was on a voyage from Seaham, County Durham to Wisbech, Cambridgeshire.
Jean and Margaret	United Kingdom	The schooner was driven ashore south of Great Yarmouth, Norfolk. She was refloated but again drove ashore. She was on a voyage from Perth to London. Jean and Margaret was refloated on 15 January and taken into Great Yarmouth for repairs.
Margaret	United Kingdom	The ship ran aground on the North Bull, in the Irish Sea. She was on a voyage from Bangor, Caernarfonshire to Dundalk, County Louth. Margaret was refloated the next day.
Princess Sophia	Netherlands	The ship ran aground off Willemstadt. She was on a voyage from Batavia, Netherlands East Indies to Rotterdam, South Holland. She was refloated and put into Hellevoetsluis, Zeeland.

== 5 January ==
List of shipwrecks: 5 January 1842
Ship	State	Description
Alert	United Kingdom	The sloop collided with the smack Britannia (United Kingdom) and sank in the North Sea off the coast of Kent.
Angelique	Denmark	The ship was driven ashore at Margate, Kent. She was on a voyage from Copenhagen to Cádiz, Spain. She was refloated on 7 January and taken into Ramsgate, Kent.
Minerva	United Kingdom	The ship ran aground in the Bristol Channel off the coast of Glamorgan.
Viscount Melbourne	United Kingdom	The ship was wrecked on the Luconia Shoals, in the China Seas. All on board abandoned ship in five boats, two of which were reported missing.

== 6 January ==
List of shipwrecks: 6 January 1842
Ship	State	Description
Dart	United Kingdom	The ship was destroyed by fire at Amsterdam, North Holland, Netherlands. She was on a voyage from London to Amsterdam.
Euro	Trieste	The ship was sighted in the Atlantic Ocean whilst on a voyage from Trieste to an English port. No further trace, presumed foundered with the loss of all hands.
Mary Ann and Martha	United Kingdom	The ship was in collision with the steamship Royal William (United Kingdom) and sank in the English Channel off The Lizard, Cornwall. Her crew were rescued. She was on a voyage from Southampton, Hampshire to Cardiff, Glamorgan.

== 7 January ==
List of shipwrecks: 7 January 1842
Ship	State	Description
Mira	United Kingdom	The ship was wrecked at Whitehead, Nova Scotia, British North America. She was on a voyage from Halifax to Sydney, Nova Scotia.
Mount Agnes	United Kingdom	The ship was wrecked on Tory Island, County Donegal with the loss of all hands.
Nelly	United Kingdom	The ship ran aground on the Tegeler Sand, in the North Sea. She was refloated but consequently sank the next day. Her crew were rescued. She was on a voyage from Aberdeen to Hamburg.
Saltram	United Kingdom	The ship ran aground on the Nore. She was on a voyage from London to Plymouth, or vice versa. She was refloated on 8 January and resumed her voyage.
Spero	United Kingdom	The ship sprang a leak and foundered south east of Dunkirk, Nord, France. Her crew were rescued. She was on a voyage from Sunderland, County Durham to Calais, France.

== 8 January ==
List of shipwrecks: 8 January 1842
Ship	State	Description
Conservative	United Kingdom	The whaler, a barque, was wrecked on the Tangong Benoa Rocks, Netherlands East Indies. Her crew were rescued by the schooner Planter (United Kingdom).
Express	(United Kingdom of Great Britain and Ireland) British North America	The ship was wrecked at Portugal Cove, Newfoundland. Her crew were rescued.
Friheten	Netherlands	The ship ran aground in the Swine Bottoms. She was on a voyage from Saint Petersburg, Russia to the Zaan. She was refloated and taken into Helsingør, Denmark.
Hope	United Kingdom	The ship was run down and sunk in the Irish Sea off Holyhead, Anglesey by North America (United Kingdom). She was on a voyage from Liverpool, Lancashire to Ostend, West Flanders, Belgium.
Marianne or Mary Ann	United Kingdom	The ship was driven ashore at Lowestoft, Suffolk. She capsized the next day and was wrecked. She was on a voyage from Great Yarmouth, Norfolk to Newquay, Cornwall.
Montagnaise	United Kingdom	The schooner was wrecked on Tory Island, County Donegal with the loss of all hands.
New Maria	United Kingdom	The smack was wrecked on the Long Sand, in the North Sea off the coast of Essex with the loss of two of her five crew. The survivors were rescued by Endeavour (United Kingdom). She was on a voyage from Scarborough, Yorkshire to London.
Thames	United Kingdom	The ship was wrecked on the Gunfleet Sand, in the North Sea off the coast of Essex. Her crew were rescued by New Blossom (United Kingdom). She was on a voyage from Goole, Yorkshire to London.
HMS Volcano	United Kingdom	The paddle steamer ran aground and was damaged off Margate, Kent. She was on a voyage from Portsmouth, Hampshire to Woolwich, Kent. She was refloated with assistance from HMS Monkey (Royal Navy) and towed into Woolwich for repairs.

== 9 January ==
List of shipwrecks: 9 January 1842
Ship	State	Description
Camilla	United Kingdom	The schooner was in collision with the brig Commodore Napier (United Kingdom) and sank in the North Sea off Coquet Island, Northumberland with the loss of all but one of her five crew.
Diana	United Kingdom	The ship was driven ashore at Morcanfield Point, County Down. She was on a voyage from Sligo to Liverpool, Lancashire. She was refloated on 15 January and taken into Warrenpoint, County Down.
Eleanor	United Kingdom	The ship was wrecked on the Cross Sand, in the North Sea off the coast of Norfolk. Her crew were rescued.
Isabella Gordon	United Kingdom	The ship foundered off "Hisker Island". Her crew were rescued. She was on a voyage from Dublin to Peterhead, Aberdeenshire.
Osage	United States	The ship was wrecked on the English Bank, in the River Plate. She was on a voyage from Philadelphia, Pennsylvania to Montevideo, Uruguay and Manila, Spanish East Indies.
Shenandoah	United States	The ship ran aground on the Burbo Bank, in Liverpool Bay.
Tyrian	United Kingdom	The ship ran aground at Point Coapu, Mississippi, United States. She was on a voyage from Natchez, Mississippi to Liverpool.

== 10 January ==
List of shipwrecks: 10 January 1842
Ship	State	Description
Dunn	United Kingdom	The brig was driven ashore and wrecked at Seaford, Sussex. She was on a voyage from Littlehampton, Sussex to Sunderland, County Durham.
Elizabeth	United Kingdom	The brig was driven ashore at Seaford. She was refloated on 23 January and taken into Newhaven, Sussex.
Industry	(United Kingdom of Great Britain and Ireland) Isle of Man	The ship was driven ashore in Brighouse Bay, Kirkcudbrightshire. All on board were rescued.
Iris	United Kingdom	The ship foundered in the North Sea off Flamborough Head, Yorkshire.
James Metcalfe	United Kingdom	The ship sank off Howth, County Dublin. Her crew were rescued.
Margaret	United Kingdom	The ship was wrecked on Cape Sable Island, Nova Scotia, British North America. she was on a voyage from Liverpool, Lancashire to Saint John, New Brunswick, British North America.
William Turcan	United Kingdom	The ship was driven ashore at Rattray Head, Aberdeenshire. She was on a voyage from Alloa, Clackmannanshire to Saint Thomas, Virgin Islands. She had become a wreck by 13 January.

== 11 January ==
List of shipwrecks: 11 January 1842
Ship	State	Description
Morrison	United States	The ship ran aground on the Little Egg Harbour Shoals, in the Atlantic Ocean off the coast of New Jersey. She was on a voyage from Canton, China to New York.

== 12 January ==
List of shipwrecks: 12 January 1842
Ship	State	Description
Amelia	United Kingdom	The ship was wrecked on Colonsay, Inner Hebrides. Her crew were rescued. She was on a voyage from Pictou, Nova Scotia, British North America to Liverpool, Lancashire.
Amulet	United Kingdom	The ship ran aground off Redcar, Yorkshire. She was on a voyage from London to Stockton-on-Tees, County Durham. She was refloated the next day and resumed her voyage.
Fanny	United Kingdom	The ship departed from Sanlúcar de Barrameda, Spain for London. No further trace, presumed foundered with the loss of all hands.
George	United Kingdom	The ship was wrecked in Clonea Bay, County Waterford. Her crew were rescued. She was on a voyage from Lisbon, Portugal to Glasgow, Renfrewshire.
Germ	United Kingdom	The ship was driven ashore and wrecked at Cranbury Head, New Jersey, United States. Her crew were rescued. She was on a voyage from Great Yarmouth, Norfolk to Boston, Massachusetts, United States.
Havannah	United Kingdom	The ship was run into by the corvette Véloce (French Navy) and sank in the Mediterranean Sea. Her crew were rescued. She was on a voyage from Genoa, Kingdom of Sardinia to Glasgow.
Medus	(United Kingdom of Great Britain and Ireland) Jersey	The ship was wrecked at "L'Ararache". Her crew were rescued.
Reward	United Kingdom	The ship collided with Hebe (United Kingdom) and foundered in the English Channel. Her crew were rescued. She was on a voyage from Plymouth, Devon to Montevideo, Uruguay.
William	United Kingdom	The ship was damaged by fire in the Gloucester and Berkeley Canal near Gloucester.

== 13 January ==
List of shipwrecks: 13 January 1842
Ship	State	Description
Armena	United Kingdom	The ship was driven ashore near the Sandown Fort, Isle of Wight and was abandoned by her crew. She was on a voyage from Southampton, Hampshire to Sunderland, County Durham. She was refloated on 18 January.
Baltic	United Kingdom	The schooner foundered in Studland Bay. Her crew were rescued. She was refloated on 27 March and taken into Cowes, Isle of Wight.
Constante	Kingdom of Sardinia	The ship was driven ashore and wrecked north of Cape Santa Maria, Uruguay.
Dibdin	United Kingdom	The ship was wrecked on the Black Rock, Isle of Wight with the loss of all hands. She was on a voyage from Jersey, Channel Islands to London.
George and Henry	United Kingdom	The ship was driven ashore and wrecked at Ballinacourty, County Waterford. Her crew were rescued. She was on a voyage from Lisbon, Portugal to Glasgow, Renfrewshire.
Instow	United Kingdom	The ship was driven ashore at Swansea, Glamorgan and was scuttled. She was on a voyage from Newport, Monmouthshire to Barnstaple, Devon.
Isadore	United Kingdom	The ship was driven ashore and wrecked near Ryde, Isle of Wight. She was on a voyage from Cardiff, Glamorgan to London. She was refloated on 26 February and towed into Portsmouth, Hampshire.
James Murphy	United Kingdom	The ship sank at The Mumbles, Glamorgan. She was on a voyage from Hayle, Cornwall to Port Talbot, Glamorgan. She was refloated on 16 January and put into Swansea for repairs.
Mary	United Kingdom	The ship was run ashore at Soldiers Point, Ireland having run aground off Carlingford, County Louth. She was on a voyage from Whitehaven, Cumberland to Dublin.
Nancy	United Kingdom	The ship was driven ashore in Studland Bay. She was on a voyage from France to Southampton. She was refloated on 15 January and taken into Swanage, Dorset.
Phoenix	United Kingdom	The schooner was driven ashore at The Mumbles, Glamorgan. She was later refloated.
Sarah	United Kingdom	The ship was driven ashore at Swansea and was scuttled. She was on a voyage from Harwich, Essex to Bristol, Gloucestershire.
Southwick	United Kingdom	The ship foundered in the North Sea off Caister-on-Sea, Norfolk.
Test	United Kingdom	The ship was abandoned in the Atlantic Ocean. Her crew were rescued by Amatia (United Kingdom). Test foundered the next day. She was on a voyage from Odesa to Antwerp, Belgium.
Thomas Gales	United Kingdom	The brig was driven ashore and damaged at Sunderland. Her crew were rescued by the Sunderland Lifeboat. Thomas Gales was refloated on 17 January and taken into Sunderland.
Tyne	United Kingdom	The ship was driven ashore and wrecked at Lowestoft, Suffolk.
William	United Kingdom	The brig was driven ashore at Sunderland.

== 14 January ==
List of shipwrecks: 14 January 1842
Ship	State	Description
Albion	United Kingdom	The ship was driven ashore and wrecked near Hartley, Northumberland.
Chapman	France	The ship was wrecked near "Vernon". She was on a voyage from Algiers, Algeria to Marseille, Bouches-du-Rhône.
Conrad	United Kingdom	The ship was driven ashore at Blyth, Northumberland. She was on a voyage from Great Yarmouth, Norfolk to Blyth. Conrad was refloated the next day.
John Lee	United Kingdom	The ship was driven ashore and wrecked south of Porto, Portugal with the loss of all hands.
Morning Star	United Kingdom	The brig ran aground and was damaged at Sunderland, County Durham. She was refloated the next day.
Newport	United Kingdom	The ship was driven ashore at the mouth of the River Tees.
Perseverance	United Kingdom	The ship ran aground on Camboy's Rock. She was refloated on 27 January and taken into Blyth, Northumberland.
Regent	United Kingdom	The ship was driven ashore at Folkestone, Kent. She was on a voyage from Havre de Grâce, Seine-Inférieure, France to Newcastle upon Tyne, Northumberland. She was refloated and taken into Dover, Kent.
Staatsrad Baud	Netherlands	The ship was driven ashore by ice on the Horsens. She was on a voyage from Batavia, Netherlands East Indies to Amsterdam, North Holland. She was later refloated and taken into the Niewue Diep.

== 15 January ==
List of shipwrecks: 15 January 1842
Ship	State	Description
Albion	United Kingdom	The ship was driven ashore at Cádiz, Spain. She was later refloated.
Christian	United Kingdom	The ship capsized in the Atlantic Ocean off Cabo da Roca, Portugal. She was abandoned on 18 January, her crew were rescued by Oberon (United Kingdom). Christian was on a voyage from Liverpool, Lancashire to Lisbon, Portugal.
Hound	United Kingdom	The ship ran aground at Figueira da Foz, Portugal. She was on a voyage from Saint John's, Newfoundland to Figueira da Foz.
King William	United Kingdom	The ship was driven ashore and damaged near Sunderland, County Durham. She was refloated on 17 January and taken into Sunderland.
Lion	United Kingdom	The ship was driven ashore at the "Inisgrette Lighthouse", County Mayo. She was on a voyage from Glasgow, Renfrewshire to Limerick. She was refloated.
Mary	United Kingdom	The ship was wrecked near Sunderland. Her crew were rescued.
Paul Jones	United States	The ship was wrecked on Saint Domingo. Her crew were rescued. She was on a voyage from Cádiz, Spain to New Orleans, Louisiana.
Sarah	United Kingdom	The ship was driven ashore and severely damaged at Port St. Mary, Isle of Man. She was on a voyage from Castletown, Isle of Man to Liverpool. Sarah was refloated on 17 January.
Shamrock	United Kingdom	The ship was driven ashore and damaged near Sunderland. She was refloated.
Victoria	United Kingdom	The ship was driven ashore and wrecked in the Sound of Mull. Her crew were rescued. She was on a voyage from South Shields, County Durham to Dublin.

== 16 January ==
List of shipwrecks: 16 January 1842
Ship	State	Description
Chance	United Kingdom	The ship foundered in the Atlantic Ocean. Her crew were rescued by Victoria (United Kingdom). Chance was on a voyage from Liverpool, Lancashire to Naples, Kingdom of the Two Sicilies.
Eden	United Kingdom	The ship ran aground on the Kentish Knock. She floated off but consequently sank. Her crew were rescued. She was on a voyage from Poole, Dorset to Newcastle upon Tyne, Northumberland.
George	United Kingdom	The ship was driven ashore and sank at Douglas, Isle of Man. She was on a voyage from Killough, County Louth to Liverpool, Lancashire.
Urania	Netherlands	The ship was driven ashore on the Oud Hoofd. She was on a voyage from Batavia, Netherlands East Indies to Amsterdam, North Holland.
Victoria	United Kingdom	The ship was driven ashore and wrecked at Bude, Cornwall. Her crew were rescued. She was on a voyage from Porthcawl, Glamorgan to Bude.

== 17 January ==
List of shipwrecks: 17 January 1842
Ship	State	Description
Watson	United Kingdom	The ship was driven ashore at Arbroath, Forfarshire. She was on a voyage from Liverpool, Lancashire to Arbroath. Watson was refloated and taken into Arbroath.

== 18 January ==
List of shipwrecks: 18 January 1842
Ship	State	Description
James & Helen	United Kingdom	The ship was driven ashore east of Calais, France. She was on a voyage from South Shields, County Durham to Cádiz, Spain.

== 19 January ==
List of shipwrecks: 19 January 1842
Ship	State	Description
Mary	United Kingdom	The sloop sprang a leak and foundered in the North Sea off Souter Point, County Durham. Her crew were rescued.

== 20 January ==
List of shipwrecks: 20 January 1842
Ship	State	Description
Ann	United Kingdom	The ship was driven ashore near Bootle, Lancashire. She was on a voyage from Fort William, Inverness-shire to Liverpool, Lancashire.
Ardent	United Kingdom	The brig was driven ashore and sank near Porthdinllaen, Caernarfonshire with the loss two of her crew.
Elizabeth	United Kingdom	The ship was driven ashore at Leasowe Castle, Cheshire She was on a voyage from Liverpool to London.
Enterprise	United Kingdom	The ship was driven ashore near Ravenglass, Cumberland. She was on a voyage from Dublin to Maryport, Cumberland.
Margaret	United Kingdom	The ship ran aground on the Benbow Bank, in Liverpool Bay. She was on a voyage from Liverpool to Ross-on-Wye, Herefordshire.
Mary	United Kingdom	The ship was driven ashore near Bootle. She was on a voyage from Liverpool to Dundee, Forfarshire.
Queen of the Isles	United Kingdom	The ship was abandoned in the Gulf of Lyon. Her crew were rescued. She was on a voyage from Sunderland, County Durham to Marseille, Bouches-du-Rhône, France.
Solway	United Kingdom	The ship was driven ashore 3 nautical miles (5.6 km) east of Porthdinllaen. She was on a voyage from Liverpool to Barbados. She was driven higher up the beach on 27 February and was reported to be severely hogged. Solway was refloated on 27 June and taken into Porthdinllaen.
Tyro	United Kingdom	The ship struck a rock off Planosa and was consequently beached near Portoferraio, Elba, Grand Duchy of Tuscany. She was on a voyage from Yarmouth to Civitavecchia, Papal States.

== 21 January ==
List of shipwrecks: 21 January 1842
Ship	State	Description
Ann and Hannah	United Kingdom	The ship was wrecked on the Annat Sandbank, in the North Sea. Her three crew were rescued by the Arbroath Lifeboat. She was on a voyage from Newcastle upon Tyne, Northumberland to Thurso, Caithness.
Balgowan	United Kingdom	The ship was driven ashore at Sunderland, County Durham. She was refloated.
James Wright	United Kingdom	The ship was driven ashore and wrecked at Civitavecchia, Papal States. Her crew were rescued. She was on a voyage from Málaga, Spain to Civitavecchia.
Sovereign	United Kingdom	The ship was driven ashore at Southwold, Suffolk. She was on a voyage from Norwich, Norfolk to London. Sovereign was refloated the next day and taken into Southwold.
Trafalgar	United Kingdom	The ship was wrecked on Papa Westray, Orkney Islands with the loss of a crew member. She was on a voyage from Banff, Aberdeenshire to Wick, Caithness.

== 22 January ==
List of shipwrecks: 22 January 1842
Ship	State	Description
Camilla	France	The schooner was in collision with another vessel and sank in the English Channel. She was on a voyage from Havre de Grâce, Seine-Inférieure, France to Southampton, Hampshire or vice versa.
Comet	United Kingdom	The ship was driven ashore at Dysart, Fife. She was on a voyage from Newport, Monmouthshire to Kirkcaldy, Fife. She was refloated the next day and taken into Kirkcaldy.
Dove	United Kingdom	The sloop was driven ashore and wrecked at Caernarfon. She was on a voyage from Mostyn, Flintshire of Porthdinllaen, Caernarfonshire.
Edward	United Kingdom	The ship was driven ashore at Pill Point, Pembrokeshire and was abandoned by her crew. She was later refloated and taken into Pembroke Dock.
George IV	United Kingdom	The ship sprang a leak and was beached at Milford Haven, Pembrokeshire. She was on a voyage from Newport to Palermo, Sicily. She was refloated on 26 January.
Honour	United Kingdom	The schooner was driven ashore at "Tacumstrin", County Wexford. She was on a voyage from Messina, Sicily to Liverpool, Lancashire, United Kingdom.
Hope	United Kingdom	The ship was driven ashore at Hubberston Pill. She was on a voyage from Glasgow, Renfrewshire to Palermo, Sicily.
London	United Kingdom	The ship was driven ashore at Gibraltar. She was on a voyage from Sumatra, Netherlands East Indies to Trieste. She was refloated with assistance from the schooner Andaluz (Spain) and proceeded on her voyage.
Marine	United States	The barque was driven ashore south of Thomas Point, Maryland.
Renown	United Kingdom	The ship was wrecked in Loch Seaforth.
Rose	United Kingdom	The ship was driven ashore at Port Fleetwood, Lancashire. She was on a voyage from Bardsey Island, Caernarfonshire to Liverpool.
Star	United Kingdom	The brig was driven ashore at Bridlington, Yorkshire. Her crew were rescued by the Bridlington Lifeboat. She was on a voyage from Sunderland, County Durham to London.
Stockton Packet	United Kingdom	The ship ran aground and was damaged at Whitby, Yorkshire. She was refloated on 28 January and taken into Whitby.
Tinker	United Kingdom	The schooner was driven ashore and wrecked at Aberdeen. Her crew were rescued by the Aberdeen Lifeboat. She was on a voyage from Newcastle upon Tyne, Northumberland to Aberdeen. She was refloated on 1 February and taken into Aberdeen in a severely damaged condition.

== 23 January ==
List of shipwrecks: 23 January 1842
Ship	State	Description
Harvest	United Kingdom	The ship struck the Coq Rock and sank. Her crew were rescued. She was on a voyage from Newcastle upon Tyne, Northumberland to Brest, Finistère, France.
Hiram	United Kingdom	The ship was driven ashore at Saltfleet, Lincolnshire. She was on a voyage from Málaga, Spain to Hull, Yorkshire. She was refloated on 28 January.
Star	United Kingdom	The ship sprang a leak and sank at Bridlington, Yorkshire. Her crew were rescued. She was on a voyage from Sunderland to London.

== 24 January ==
List of shipwrecks: 24 January 1842
Ship	State	Description
Charlotte	United Kingdom	The ship was driven ashore in Bootle Bay. She was on a voyage from Liverpool, Lancashire to Jamaica. She was refloated and taken into Liverpool.
Ceres	France	The full-rigged ship was wrecked at the mouth of the Loire near Saint-Nazaire, Loire-Inférieure with the loss of a crew member. She was on a voyage from Île Bourbon to Saint Helena and Nantes, Loire-Inférieure.
Druid	United Kingdom	The ship was wrecked at Kirkcudbright. Her crew were rescued. She was on a voyage from Workington, Cumberland to Belfast, County Antrim.
Maria	United Kingdom	The ship was driven ashore at Kirkcudbright. She was later refloated.
Trident	United Kingdom	The brig was driven ashore and wrecked in Porthwen Creek, Anglesey. Her crew were rescued. She was on a voyage from Saint Domingo to Liverpool, Lancashire.

== 25 January ==
List of shipwrecks: 25 January 1842
Ship	State	Description
Borussia	Danzig	The ship sprang a leak and was beached on the Île-d'Aix, Charente-Maritime, France. She was on a voyage from Bordeaux, Gironde, France to Danzig.
Constantia	United Kingdom	The ship was driven ashore and damaged at South Shields, County Durham. Her crew were rescued. She was refloated on 29 January.
Corriere di Malta	Kingdom of Lombardy–Venetia	The brig was driven ashore 6 nautical miles (11 km) east of Calais, France. She was on a voyage from Amsterdam, North Holland, Netherlands to Venice. She had become a wreck by 28 January.
Flora	United Kingdom	The ship was driven ashore and damaged at Sunderland, County Durham. She was refloated on 29 January and taken into Sunderland.
Jonge Jacob	Hamburg	The ship was driven ashore and wrecked at Marske-by-the-Sea, Yorkshire, United Kingdom. Her crew were rescued. She was on a voyage from Hartlepool, County Durham, United Kingdom to Altona.
Little Queen	United Kingdom	The ship was driven ashore at Southsea, Hampshire. She was on a voyage from Youghal, County Cork to Portsmouth, Hampshire. She was refloated on 27 January and taken into Portsmouth.
Mary	United Kingdom	The ship was driven ashore at the Point of Isle, Cumberland.

== 26 January ==
List of shipwrecks: 26 January 1842
Ship	State	Description
Alexander	United Kingdom	The ship was driven ashore at Ramsey, Isle of Man. She was on a voyage from Girvan, Ayrshire to Liverpool, Lancashire. She was refloated on 9 February and taken into Ramsey.
Alicia	United Kingdom	The smack was driven ashore and wrecked near Milford Haven, Pembrokeshire with the loss of two of her crew. She was on a voyage from Youghal, County Cork to Newport, Monmouthshire.
Amphitrite	United Kingdom	The ship was driven ashore west of Boulogne, Pas-de-Calais, France. She was on a voyage from Berbice, British Honduras to London.
Anne	United Kingdom	The ship was driven ashore near Kilrush, County Clare.
Anne & Betsey	United Kingdom	The sloop was driven ashore and wrecked at New Quay, Cardiganshire. Her crew were rescued.
Arethusa	United Kingdom	The ship was driven ashore and wrecked at Workington, Cumberland. Her crew were rescued. She was on a voyage from Dublin to Workington.
Argus	United Kingdom	The ship was driven ashore and damaged at Tynemouth, Northumberland. All on board were rescued by rocket Apparatus. Argus was refloated on 31 January.
Athelia	United Kingdom	The ship was driven ashore at Northam, Devon. She was on a voyage from Dungarvan, County Waterford to Newport.
Betsey	United Kingdom	The ship was driven ashore on Pill Point, Pembrokeshire. She was on a voyage from New Ross, County Wexford to Newport, Monmouthshire.
Cardiff Castle or Cardiff Lass	United Kingdom	The ship was driven ashore at Tarbert, Argyllshire. She was on a voyage from Limerick to London.
Centurion	United Kingdom	The ship sank in the River Dee at Greenfield, Flintshire with the loss of three of her four crew.
Champlain	United Kingdom	The ship was driven ashore in Tralee Bay. She was later refloated.
Chance	United Kingdom	The brig foundered in the Atlantic Ocean (37°00′N 8°40′W). Her crew were rescued by the steamship Braganza (United Kingdom). She was on a voyage from Liverpool to Naples, Kingdom of the Two Sicilies.
Chester	United Kingdom	The ship sank at Flint. Her crew were rescued.
Craig's Eliza or Eliza	United Kingdom	Captain Gray's schooner was wrecked at Tynemouth. Her crew were rescued by Argus (United Kingdom).
Countess of Arran	United Kingdom	The ship was driven ashore at Rutland, County Donegal. She was on a voyage from Liverpool to New York, United States.
Doris	United Kingdom	The ship was driven ashore near Mostyn, Flintshire.
Eliza Ann	United Kingdom	The ship was driven ashore and wrecked at "Alveroe", "Ilvarn" or "Roaine", County Clare. She was on a voyage from Limerick to London.
Favourite	United Kingdom	The ship was driven ashore near Port Gaverne, Cornwall. She was refloated on 29 January and taken into Padstow, Cornwall for repairs.
George IV	United Kingdom	The ship was driven ashore at Hubberstone Pill, Pembrokeshire. She was on a voyage from Liverpool to Newport, Monmouthshire and Palermo, Sicily. George IV was refloated the next day.
Good Intent	United Kingdom	The ship was driven ashore at Barmston, Yorkshire. Her crew were rescued. She was refloated on 30 January and taken into Bridlington, Yorkshire.
Henry and William	United Kingdom	The ship was driven ashore at Ramsey, Isle of Man. Her crew were rescued. She was on a voyage from Leith, Lothian to Liverpool. She was refloated on 28 January and taken into Ramsey.
Hope	United Kingdom	The ship was driven ashore near Allonby, Cumberland. She was refloated on 28 February and taken into Maryport, Cumberland.
Hope	United Kingdom	The ship was driven ashore at Kirkcudbright.
Jessie	United Kingdom	The ship capsized at Limerick.
Kirton	United Kingdom	The brig struck the Corton Sands, in the North Sea off the coast of Suffolk and foundered. Her seven crew were rescued.
Lansdowne	United Kingdom	The ship was driven ashore at Ardmore, County Waterford.
Leonora	United Kingdom	The ship was driven ashore at Kingstown, County Dublin. She was on a voyage from Dublin to London.
Liberty	United Kingdom	The ship sank at Limerick. She was refloated on 1 February.
Margaret	United Kingdom	The ship foundered in Liverpool Bay off Hoylake, Lancashire. Her crew were rescued.
Mary and Ann	United Kingdom	The sloop was driven ashore and wrecked at Cardigan. Her crew were rescued.
Mary Connolly	United Kingdom	The ship was wrecked in St Brides Bay. Her crew were rescued. She was on a voyage from Kinsale, County Cork to Newport.
Norris Castle	United Kingdom	The ship was driven ashore and wrecked in Carmarthen Bay. Her crew were rescued. She was on a voyage from Wexford to Gloucester.
Nymph	United Kingdom	The smack foundered in the Bristol Channel off Llanelly, Glamorgan.
Ocean	United Kingdom	The ship was driven ashore and wrecked at South Shields. Her crew were rescued by Rocket apparatus. She was on a voyage from Hartlepool, County Durham to London.
Olive	United Kingdom	The ship was driven ashore at Ringmoylan Point, County Limerick.
Pembrokeshire Lass	United Kingdom	The ship was driven ashore on Hog Island, County Limerick. She was on a voyage from Limerick to London.
Pomona	United Kingdom	The ship was driven ashore at Workington. She was refloated on 29 January.
Prosperity	United Kingdom	The smack was driven ashore at Warrenpoint, County Down.
Remke	Netherlands	The galiot was driven ashore and wrecked west of Dover, Kent, United Kingdom. Her crew were rescued. She was on a voyage from Surinam to Amsterdam, North Holland.
Rhoda	United Kingdom	The ship was driven into the pier and damaged at Holyhead, Anglesey. She was on a voyage from Liverpool to Venice, Kingdom of Lombardy–Venetia.
Sarah	United Kingdom	The schooner was driven ashore and wrecked at Rastoonstown, County Wexford with the loss of all but one of her crew. She was on a voyage from Llanelly, Glamorgan to Bannow, County Wexford.
Sir A. N. McNabb	United Kingdom	The brig was driven ashore at Killough, County Down. She was on a voyage from Troon, Ayrshire to Marseille, Bouches-du-Rhône, France.
Stag	United Kingdom	The full-rigged ship was wrecked near Leasowe Castle, Cheshire. She was on a voyage from Beaumaris, Anglesey to Liverpool.
Thomas Oliver	United Kingdom	The ship ran aground on the Inner Shoals, in the North Sea off the coast of Suffolk. She capsized and sank. Her crew were rescued.
Union	United Kingdom	The ship was driven ashore at the mouth of the River Parrett. Her crew were rescued.
Unity	United Kingdom	The fishing smack was wrecked on the Christchurch Ledge, in the English Channel off the coast of Hampshire with the loss of four lives.
Urania	Malta	The full-rigged ship was driven ashore and wrecked on Great Saltee, in the Saltee Islands, County Wexford with the loss of six her seventeen crew, or of eleven of her sixteen crew. She was on a voyage from Malta to Liverpool.
Venus	United Kingdom	The ship was driven ashore at the mouth of the River Parrett. Her crew were rescued.
HMS Vindictive	Royal Navy	The Vengeur-class ship of the line ran aground on The Dean, in the English Channel off the Isle of Wight. She was refloated the next day.
Vulcan	United Kingdom	The ship was driven ashore near Kilrush.
William	(United Kingdom of Great Britain and Ireland) Isle of Man	The ship was driven ashore at Ramsey.
Worcester	United Kingdom	The ship was driven ashore at the mouth of the River Parrett. Her crew were rescued.

== 27 January ==
List of shipwrecks: 27 January 1842
Ship	State	Description
Alderson	United Kingdom	The ship was driven ashore and wrecked at Sea Palling, Norfolk. She was on a voyage from London to Sunderland, County Durham.
Amedie	France	The ship was in collision with some Royal Navy warships and was beached at Sheerness, Kent, United Kingdom.
Brutus	United Kingdom	The ship was driven ashore and wrecked at Ballywalter, County Down. She was on a voyage from the Clyde to Saint Thomas, Virgin Islands. The wreck was towed into Belfast, County Antrim on 2 February for repairs.
David and John	United Kingdom	The schooner was beached at Pwllheli, Caernarfonshire. She was on a voyage from Liverpool, Lancashire to Bilbao, Spain.
Eliza	United Kingdom	The ship was driven ashore and wrecked at South Shields, County Durham.
Hercules	United States	The ship was driven ashore at Charleston, South Carolina. She was on a voyage from Charleston to Copenhagen, Denmark. She was refloated the next day and taken into Charleston.
James	United Kingdom	The ship sank in Rye Bay.
Lerwick	United Kingdom	The schooner was driven ashore and wrecked at Ballyferris, County Down. Her crew were rescued. She was on a voyage from Dublin to Lerwick, Shetland Islands.
Margaret and Catherine	United Kingdom	The ship was driven ashore and wrecked at Theddlethorpe, Lincolnshire.
Olive	(United Kingdom of Great Britain and Ireland) Isle of Man	The sloop was driven ashore near Southport, Lancashire.
Oliver Lloyd	United Kingdom	The ship was driven ashore at Warrenpoint, County Down.
Perseverance	United Kingdom	The ship was wrecked at Trebarwith, Cornwall. Her crew were rescued.
Sarah	United Kingdom	The ship was driven ashore and wrecked at Wexford. She was on a voyage from Llanelly, Glamorgan to Barrow-in-Furness, Lancashire.
Tom	United Kingdom	The schooner was driven ashore between Blackpool and Rossall, Lancashire. Her crew were rescued. She was on a voyage from Newry, County Antrim to Preston, Lancashire. Tom was refloated on 30 January.
Zelina	France	The ship was driven ashore at Laguna. She was consequently condemned.

== 28 January ==
List of shipwrecks: 28 January 1842
Ship	State	Description
Ohonia	United Kingdom	The ship was wrecked in the Saltee Islands, County Wexford with the loss of six of her crew. She was on a voyage from Malta to Liverpool, Lancashire.

== 29 January ==
List of shipwrecks: 29 January 1842
Ship	State	Description
Brunswick	United Kingdom	The ship was wrecked in Liverpool Bay.
Caledonia	United Kingdom	The ship was driven ashore on the Sandwich Flats. She was on a voyage from Ramsgate, Kent to Southampton, Hampshire. She was refloated and resumed her voyage.
Dispatch	United Kingdom	The ship ran aground on the Cockle Sand, in the North Sea off the coast of Norfolk. She was later refloated.
Nightingale	(United Kingdom of Great Britain and Ireland) British North America	The schooner was driven ashore and wrecked at Quaco, New Brunswick.
Peruvian	United Kingdom	The brig was driven ashore and wrecked at Flamborough Head, Yorkshire. Her crew survived. She was on a voyage from South Shields, County Durham to London.
Vermillion	United Kingdom	The brig was driven ashore and wrecked at Flamborough Head. Her crew were rescued by the Coast Guard.

== 30 January ==
List of shipwrecks: 30 January 1842
Ship	State	Description
Daphne	United Kingdom	The ship ran aground on the Scroby Sands, Norfolk. She was on a voyage from South Shields, County Durham to Guernsey, Channel Islands. She was later refloated.
Falkland	United Kingdom	The ship was wrecked at Porto Recanati, Papal States with the loss of five lives. She was on a voyage from Cardiff, Glamorgan to Ancona, Papal States.
Hastings	United Kingdom	The brig ran aground on the West Rocks, off Harwich, Essex. She was refloated the next day.
Jackson	United Kingdom	The ship ran aground on the Burbo Bank, in Liverpool Bay. She was on a voyage from Liverpool, Lancashire to Trinidad.
Lavinia	United Kingdom	The ship was wrecked at Porto Recanati with the loss of five lives. She was on a voyage from London to Ancona.
William	United Kingdom	The ship was wrecked between Cape St. Francis and Flat Rock, Newfoundland, British North America with the loss of six of her twelve crew. She was on a voyage from Poole, Dorset to Trinity, Newfoundland.
Zealous	United Kingdom	The ship sank in Coldingham Bay. Her crew were rescued. She was on a voyage from Wemyss, Fife to Perth.

== 31 January ==
List of shipwrecks: 31 January 1842
Ship	State	Description
Isabella	United Kingdom	The barque was wrecked on a reef off the Caroline Islands. She was on a voyage from Sydney, New South Wales to Manila, Spanish East Indies.
Jane	United Kingdom	The ship ran aground on the Shipwash Sand, in the North Sea off the coast of Essex and was damaged. She was on a voyage from Newcastle upon Tyne, Northumberland to London. Jane was later refloated and taken into Harwich, Essex.
Velocity	United Kingdom	The sloop foundered off the coast of Caernarfonshire with the loss of all hands.

== Unknown date ==
List of shipwrecks: Unknown date in January 1842
Ship	State	Description
Amelia	United Kingdom	The ship was driven ashore at Perth, Swan River Colony before 25 January. She was on a voyage from Lombok, Spanish East Indies to Perth.
Arcadia	United Kingdom	The ship struck the Pallas Rock, in the Firth of Forth and was damaged. She was on a voyage from Saint John, New Brunswick, British North America to Leith, Lothian. Arcadia put into Burntisland, Fife.
Active	United Kingdom	The ship was driven ashore and wrecked in the Dardanelles in early January. Her crew were rescued. She was on a voyage from Constantinople, Ottoman Empire to Odesa.
Ann Bridson	United Kingdom	The ship was driven ashore in Bootle Bay. She was on a voyage from Lima, Peru to Liverpool, Lancashire. She was refloated on 28 January and taken into Liverpool.
Brillante	Spain	The mistico was abandoned in the Atlantic Ocean before 30 January. Her crew were rescued by Rosa (Brazil).
Catherine	United Kingdom	The ship was driven ashore and wrecked at Coringa, India before 22 January. Her crew were rescued.
Columbian	United Kingdom	The ship was wrecked on Imbros, Ottoman Empire in late January. Her crew were rescued.
Columbus	United States	The ship was wrecked near St. Ubes, Portugal. She was on a voyage from New York to Marseille, Bouches-du-Rhône, Framce.
Continuation	United Kingdom	The ship foundered in the North Sea off the coast of Denmark.
Dart	United Kingdom	The smack was wrecked on the Greenground, in the Bristol Channel off the coast of Glamorgan with the loss of all hands.
Diligente	Belgium	The ship was driven ashore on the coast of Dalmatia before 18 January. She was on a voyage from Trieste to Antwerp.
Helene	Flag unknown	The ship foundered in the North Sea off the coast of Denmark.
James and Ellen	United Kingdom	The ship was driven ashore and wrecked east of Calais, France. She broke up on 23 January. She was on a voyage from South Shields, County Durham to Cádiz, Spain.
John	United Kingdom	The ship ran aground on the Gunfleet Sand, in the North Sea off the coast of Essex. She was on a voyage from London to South Shields. She was refloated and taken into Harwich, Essex, where she arrived on 24 January.
Justow	United Kingdom	The ship was driven ashore at Swansea, Glamorgan. She was on a voyage from Newport, Monmouthshire to Barnstaple, Devon. She was refloated on 25 January and taken into Swansea.
Le Marianne Alexandre	France	The schooner was dismasted and abandoned in the English Channel on or before 15 January. She was on a voyage from Bordeaux, Gironde to Rouen, Seine-Inférieure. Maracia was towed into Shoreham-by-Sea, Sussex, United Kingdom by Princess Royal (United Kingdom), where she arrived on 16 January.
Liberty	United Kingdom	The ship was wrecked in the Berry Island, Bahamas before 14 January.
Newburgh	United Kingdom	The ship was damaged by ice off Pillau, Prussia between 2 and 4 January. She was on a voyage from Königsberg to Pillau. Newburgh was taken into Pillau on 7 January.
Providentia	France	The ship was driven ashore between Cádiz and Tarifa, Spain.
Prosperous	United Kingdom	The ship was abandoned in the Bristol Channel on or before 25 January. She was on a voyage from Bristol, Gloucestershire to Bridgwater, Somerset. She was driven ashore in Walton Bay.
Sarah Moore	United Kingdom	The ship was driven ashore on the Isle of Man. She was on a voyage from Castletown, Isle of Man to Liverpool, Lancashire. Sarah Moore was refloated and put into Port Erin, Isle of Man in a severely damaged condition.
Tamenend	United Kingdom	The ship was driven ashore in Bootle Bay. She was on a voyage from Liverpool to New Orleans, Louisiana, United States or vice versa. Tamenend was refloated on 27 January.
William	United Kingdom	The ship was driven ashore and damaged whilst on a voyage from Liverpool, Lancashire to Weymouth, Dorset. She was later refloated and put into Weymouth.
