= Mary Laurinda Jane Smith Beatty =

African-American abolitionist and suffrage advocate (1834–1899)

- Born: Mary Laurinda Jane Smith; February 1834 near Louisville, Kentucky, United States
- Died: September 28, 1899 (aged 65)
- Occupations: abolitionist and suffrage advocate
- Known for: one of the first Black women to publicly agitate for women suffrage west of the Mississippi
- Notable work: Cast a ballot as an American citizen and woman in Portland, Oregon (1872)
- Spouse: James William Beatty (m. 1850)
- Parents: James Madison Smith (father); Catharine Ann Philips Smith (mother)

Mary Laurinda Jane Smith Beatty (February 1834 – September 28, 1899) was an African-American abolitionist and suffrage advocate who joined Abigail Scott Duniway, Maria P. Hendee, and Mary Ann King Lambert in 1872 to cast ballots in Portland, Oregon when women were not yet afforded the right to vote. She was one of the first African-American women to publicly agitate for women's suffrage west of the Mississippi River.

== Life ==
Beatty was born Mary Laurinda Jane Smith in February 1834 near Louisville, Kentucky. Her parents, James Madison Smith and Catharine Ann Philips Smith, were free African-Americans who had purchased their freedom from slavery in the 1840s. They were married by the future Catholic bishop Ignatius A. Reynolds and were active in the Underground Railroad.

Mary was married by Bishop Martin John Spalding to James William Beatty on January 8, 1850. The couple left Kentucky shortly thereafter, in the wake of newly passed state-level restrictions on Blacks, as well as passage of the Fugitive Slave Act. They settled briefly in Hanover, Indiana, leaving Indiana too after the Indiana constitution restricted Black immigration. The couple moved steadily westward over the next decade, before settling in Portland, Oregon, in 1864.

Despite the discrimination they faced in Portland, including the state's Black Exclusion Laws of 1857 and the Poll Tax of 1862, Mary and James Beatty established successful livelihoods in Portland: Mary worked as a dressmaker, while James worked as a painter. Despite Oregon's prohibition on Blacks owning property, the Beattys owned substantial real estate holdings.

== Politics ==
Throughout their lives, the couple worked for equal rights. James Beatty directed the city's “Grand Ratification Jubilee” for the Fifteenth Amendment and supported efforts to hire Black police officers. He was a member of the Colored Lincoln Republican Club. On November 5, 1872, Mary Beatty joined Abigail Scott Duniway, Maria P. Hendee and Mary Ann King Lambert in visiting Portland's Morrison Precinct to cast ballots, As the suffrage publication The New Northwest observed, “Thus was woman suffrage vindicated in the persons of Mrs. A.J. Duniway, a colored and two white women.” A few months later, Mary Beatty “read an essay proving that the colored women are awake to their own interests” at the 1873 Oregon State Woman Suffrage Association.

Mary Beatty did not live to see the partial victory for Oregon's woman suffrage in 1912, after five failed attempts. And it would not be until passage of the Voting Rights Act in 1965 that racially discriminatory policies preventing people of color from exercising their right to vote were ended, fulfilling some part of the promise of full suffrage. Still, Mary Beatty was a forerunner of Black suffrage activists who agitated for the vote in the Portland area during the important mobilization in 1912, including Hattie Redmond and Lizzie Weeks.

== Death ==
Following an accident, Beatty died on September 28, 1899, at the age of 65. She was funeralized at St. Joseph's Catholic Church in Portland and buried at Greenwood Hills Cemetery.
