= Chinese American women's suffrage in Oregon =

Chinese American women's suffrage in Oregon details the struggle for voting rights undertaken by ethnically Chinese women in the American state of Oregon. In Oregon, Chinese women faced a sort of double legal discrimination as women's suffrage was not legalized in Oregon until 1912 and an anti-Chinese constitutional amendment remained in effect in the state until 1927.

== Initial phase ==
In 1912, in response to the suffrage movements in China, the United States, and the Pacific Northwest, Chinese American women in Portland, Oregon, established an equal suffrage society with S. K. Chan as its president. They were responsible for mobilizing Portland's Chinese neighborhoods during Oregon's suffrage movement. At the time, however, Chinese immigrants were not allowed to become naturalized citizens and were intentionally denied the right of suffrage in the Oregon Constitution.

=== 1912 and S. K. Chan ===
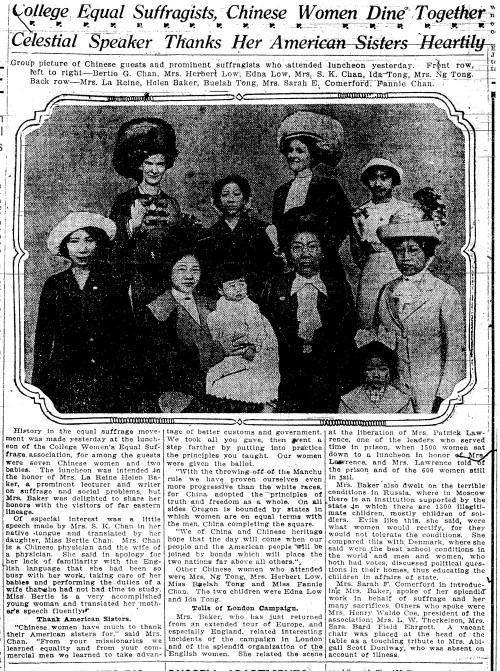
Chinese American suffrage activists in Portland, including S. K. Chan, after the La Reine Helen Baker banquet in 1912.

On April 11, 1912, seven Portland Chinese women, among them S. K. Chan, attended a banquet in honor of La Reine Helen Baker at the Portland Hotel as part of 150 equal suffrage workers. As noted in a news article from the Oregonian published on April 12, 1912, "The presence of the Chinese women at a banquet with white women is unique." Chan gave a notable speech that was translated by her daughter Bertie during the course of the dinner.

== Importance ==
The suffrage movements that were happening in China at the time were important to the development of the Chinese American suffrage movements in Portland, as they drew international attention. Chan also referenced the suffrage movements in China during her speech at the 1912 suffrage banquet in honor of La Reine Helen Baker.

Chan was a Chinese doctor (specifically, an herbalist) who practiced in Portland. She worked for the Chinese Medicine Company before striking out on her own in 1907. Chan was married to Methodist pastor Chan Sinh Kai (also known as S. K. Chan). They had at least four daughters: Bertie G. Chan, Lillian Chan, Fannie Chan, and Mary Chan.

In 1927, Oregon Constitution Article II, Section 6 was repealed, thus granting suffrage to anyone considered Chinese. In 1943, Congress repealed all Chinese exclusion laws, thus allowing Chinese immigrants the right to become naturalized citizens of the United States.

== See also ==
- Oregon Equal Suffrage Amendment
