= James Shoal =

Underwater shoal in the South China Sea

Disputed reef
- Location within Spratly Islands
- Other names: Beting Serupai; Zēngmǔ Ànshā (曾母暗沙)

Geography
- Location: South China Sea
- Coordinates: 03°58′26″N 112°20′56″E
- Total islands: 0

Administration
- Malaysia
- State: Sarawak

Claimed by
- China
- Prefecture-level city Province: Sansha Hainan
- Malaysia
- State: Sarawak
- Taiwan

James Shoal is a shoal (submerged bank) in the South China Sea, with a depth of 22 metres (72 ft) below the surface of the sea, located about 45 nautical miles (83 km; 52 mi) off the Borneo coast of Malaysia. It is claimed by Malaysia, the People's Republic of China, and the Republic of China (Taiwan). The shoal and its surrounds are administered by Malaysia.

== Name ==
The name James Shoal first appeared in British documents as early as 1892, and is possibly named after James Brooke (1803–1868), the first White Rajah of the Kingdom of Sarawak.

Malaysia refers to James Shoal as Beting Serupai ('Serupai Shoal'), with Serupai being a place name in Tatau District, Bintulu Division, Sarawak.

Both the People's Republic of China (mainland China) and the Republic of China (Taiwan) refer to James Shoal as Zengmu Reef / Zengmu Shoal / Zengmu Ansha/ Tseng-mu An-sha (Chinese: 曾母暗沙; pinyin: Zēngmǔ Ànshā; lit. 'James hidden-sand / James shoal').

== History ==
The name James Shoal first appeared in The London Gazette on November 15, 1892, as well as in the same year's British seafaring magazine The Nautical Magazine and Journal of the Royal Naval Reserve. The article reported findings from a survey conducted by Commander A. M. Field of the British naval survey ship HMS Egeria, confirming the existence of a shoal lying off the northwestern coast of Borneo. The shoal has a depth of 12 fathoms (22 m), with surrounding waters ranging from 22–31 fathoms (40–57 m), and is located approximately 25 miles (40 km) northwest of Acis Shoals, at latitude 4°0' N, longitude 112°18' E. The origin of the name James Shoal is probably derived from James Brooke (1803–1868), the first White Rajah of the Kingdom of Sarawak.

In 1935, the Land and Water Maps Review Committee of the Republic of China (ROC) produced a list of Chinese names for the rocks and reefs of the South China Sea, most of which were simply direct translations or transliterations of English names found on British maps. In this list, James Shoal was transliterated as Zengmu Tan (Chinese: 曾姆灘; pinyin: Zēngmǔ Tān; lit. 'James sandbank'). The term zengmu (曾姆) is a phonetic transliteration of "James", and tan (灘) means beach or sandbank. A beach or a sandbank is something that emerges above water, while a shoal is an underwater feature. James Shoal is 22 metres below the surface. It would appear that in 1935 the Chinese committee was unfamiliar with the area when it declared it to be a land feature, and based its territorial claims on a piece of territory that does not exist.

In October 1947, the ROC Ministry of the Interior revised the names of the islands in the South China Sea to make them sound more Chinese. The name of James Shoal was changed to Zengmu Ansha (Chinese: 曾母暗沙; pinyin: Zēngmǔ Ànshā; lit. 'James hidden-sand'). At this time, the Chinese government appeared to recognize its earlier misinterpretation of the term "shoal", because it coined the new word ansha (暗沙), literally “hidden sand”, as a neologism to use instead of tan in the name. Additionally, the transliteration of "James" was changed to 曾母 (zēngmǔ), a more Sinicized form as it can be interpreted as "the mother of Zeng", which could evoke an association with Zengzi’s mother from Confucian teachings, despite there is no actual historical connection. In December 1947, the ROC government printed an official map showing a "U-shaped line" encircling the area down to James Shoal, and claiming it as the southernmost territory of China.

In 1949, after winning the Chinese Civil War, the Chinese Communist Party established the People’s Republic of China (PRC), replacing the Republic of China (ROC) as the ruling government on the mainland and asserting its inheritance of the ROC’s territorial claims in the South China Sea. The PRC government kept the name Zengmu Ansha for James Shoal and has continued to declare it as the southernmost territory of China to this day.

== Location ==
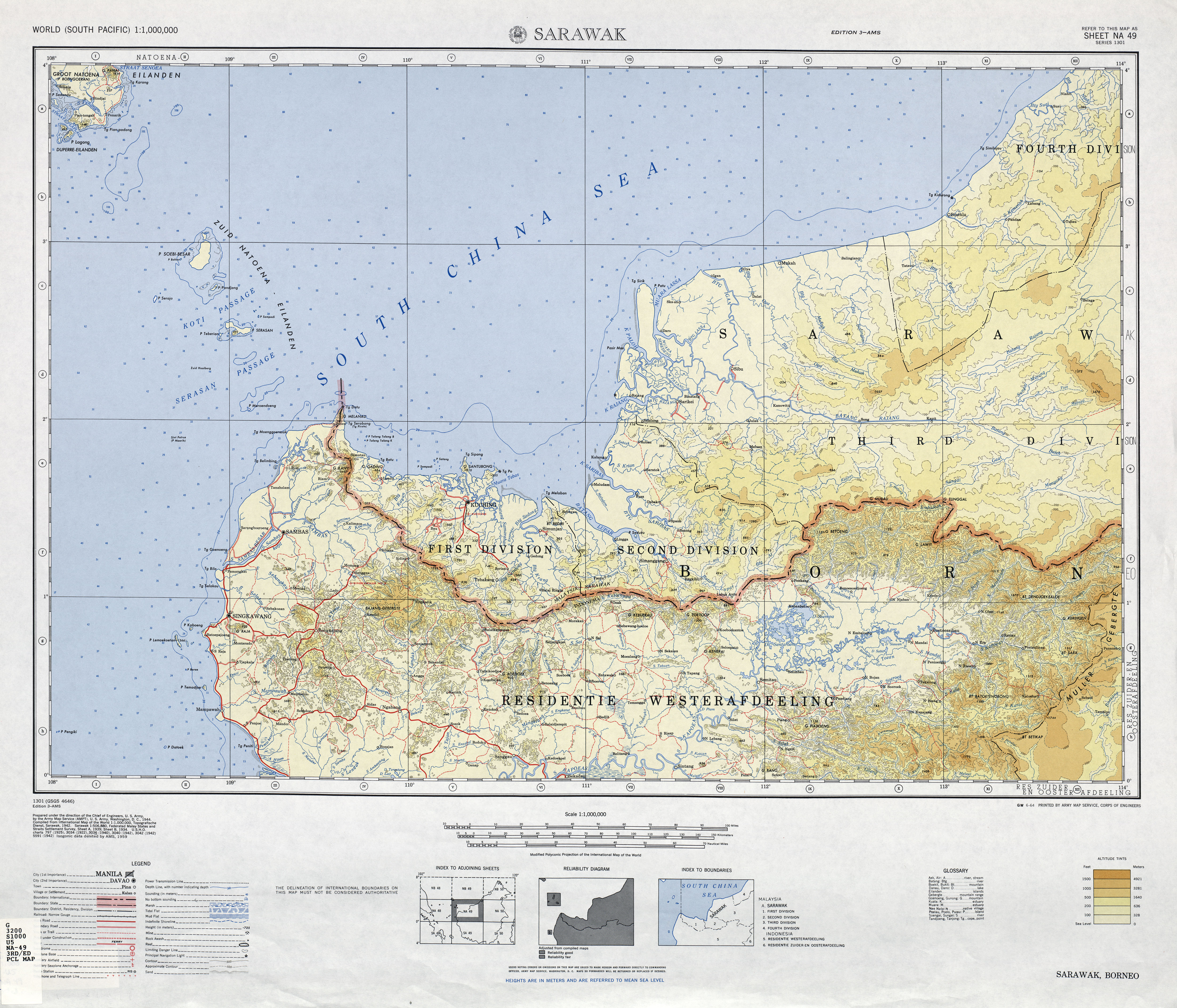
Map including the James Shoal area (in the general area labeled with '22' in the upper center of the map, meaning 22 meters below sea level) (AMS, 1959)

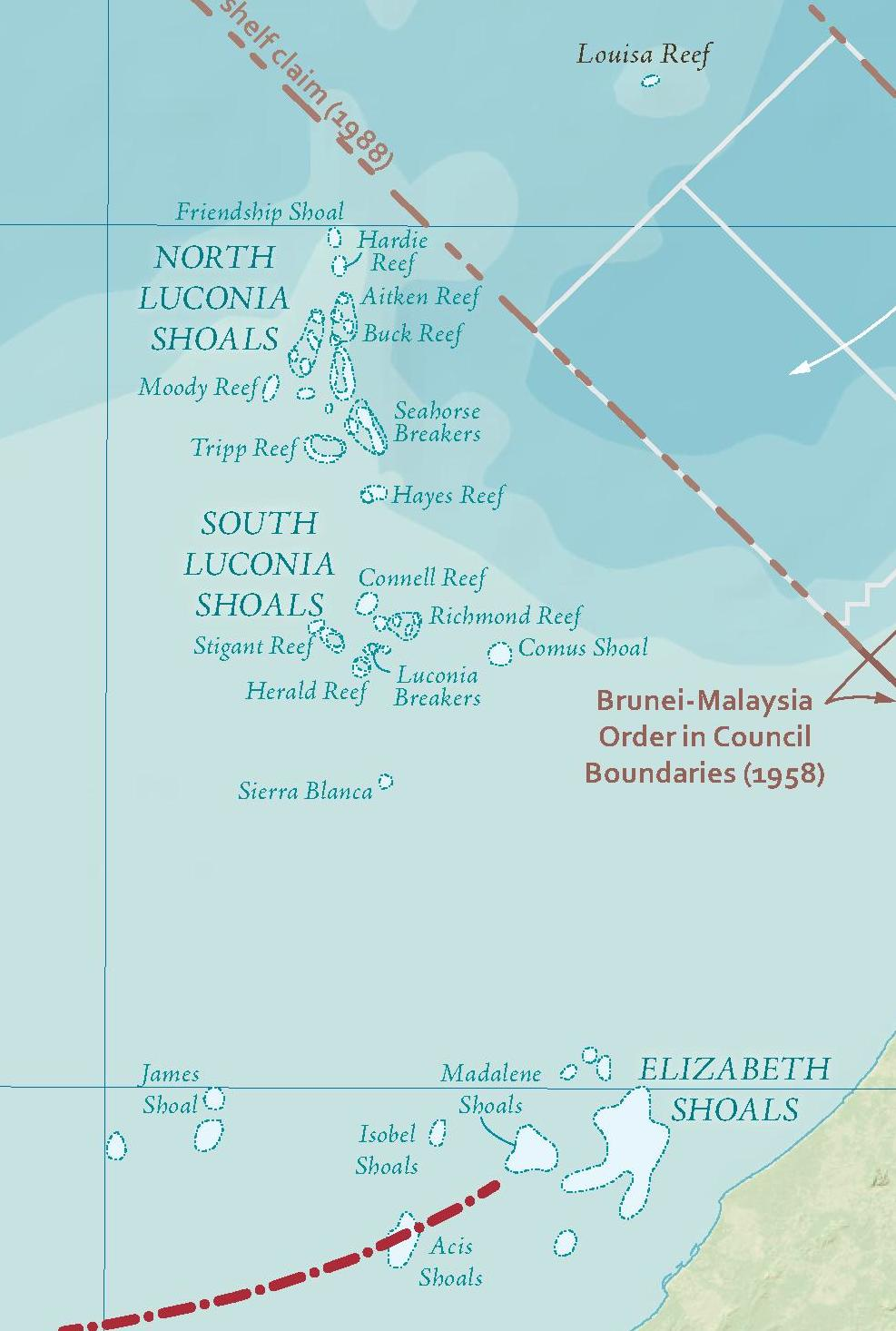
Extract from US Dept of State map showing James Shoal (lower left) and also showing Louisa Reef and Luconia Shoals.

Lying about 45 nautical miles (83 km; 52 mi) northwest of Bintulu, Malaysia on the Continental shelf of Borneo, the reef is 80 kilometres (50 mi) from the Malaysian coast and about 1,800 kilometres (1,100 mi) from mainland China. Geographically, it sits south of the Spratly Islands, but is sometimes grouped with them as part of international disputes over sovereignty in the South China Sea.

The reef is embedded in the continental shelf of Malaysia and well within its 200 nautical mile EEZ.

Nearby reefs are Parsons' Shoal and Lydie Shoal, and the Luconia Shoals, the latter 97 to 223 km to the north.

== Territorial dispute ==
=== Malaysia's claim ===
Malaysia's claim on the reef is based on the continental shelf principle, on the basis that Malaysia is the only country whose continental shelf covers James Shoal. International law defines continental shelf as a natural extension of a country's landmass to a distance of 200 nautical miles (maximum 350 nautical miles). Drawn from the mainland or any of its islands in the South China Sea, the continental shelf of China is well short of James Shoal. Similarly, James Shoal is also not part of the extended continental shelf of Vietnam, the Philippines or Republic of China (Taiwan).

In May 2009, Vietnam and Malaysia put up a Joint submission on the Extended Continental Shelf to the UN Committee on the Limit of Continental Shelf (CLCS) whereby Vietnam acknowledged that James Shoal is not part of its extended continental shelf.

James Shoal is 500 nautical miles (930 km; 580 mi) from Thitu Island (Pagasa) in the Spratlys that the Philippines has occupied since 1971, and more than 400 nautical miles (740 km; 460 mi) from Itu Aba, an island that Republic of China (Taiwan) has occupied since 1956. It is also outside Brunei's extended maritime zone which the 2009 Letter of Exchange that Brunei has with Malaysia attests to. In 1969, Malaysia and Indonesia signed a Treaty on the continental shelf, off Tanjung Datu, Sarawak, which has placed James Shoal on the Malaysian side.

==== Malaysian jurisdiction ====
Malaysia has also effectively asserted its jurisdiction over its continental shelf including the areas in and around James Shoal, Parson's Shoal and the Lydie Shoal. The activities of the Malaysian authorities include the construction and maintenance of a light-buoy on nearby Parson's Shoal on a 24/7 basis, daily patrolling and policing of the area by the Royal Malaysian Navy and the Malaysian Maritime Enforcement Agency and undertaking economic activities like exploration for and production of hydrocarbon resources on a sustained basis.

Under international law, such display of peaceful and continuous activities over a long period is tantamount to establishing a titre de souverain (acts of the sovereign).

=== China's claim ===
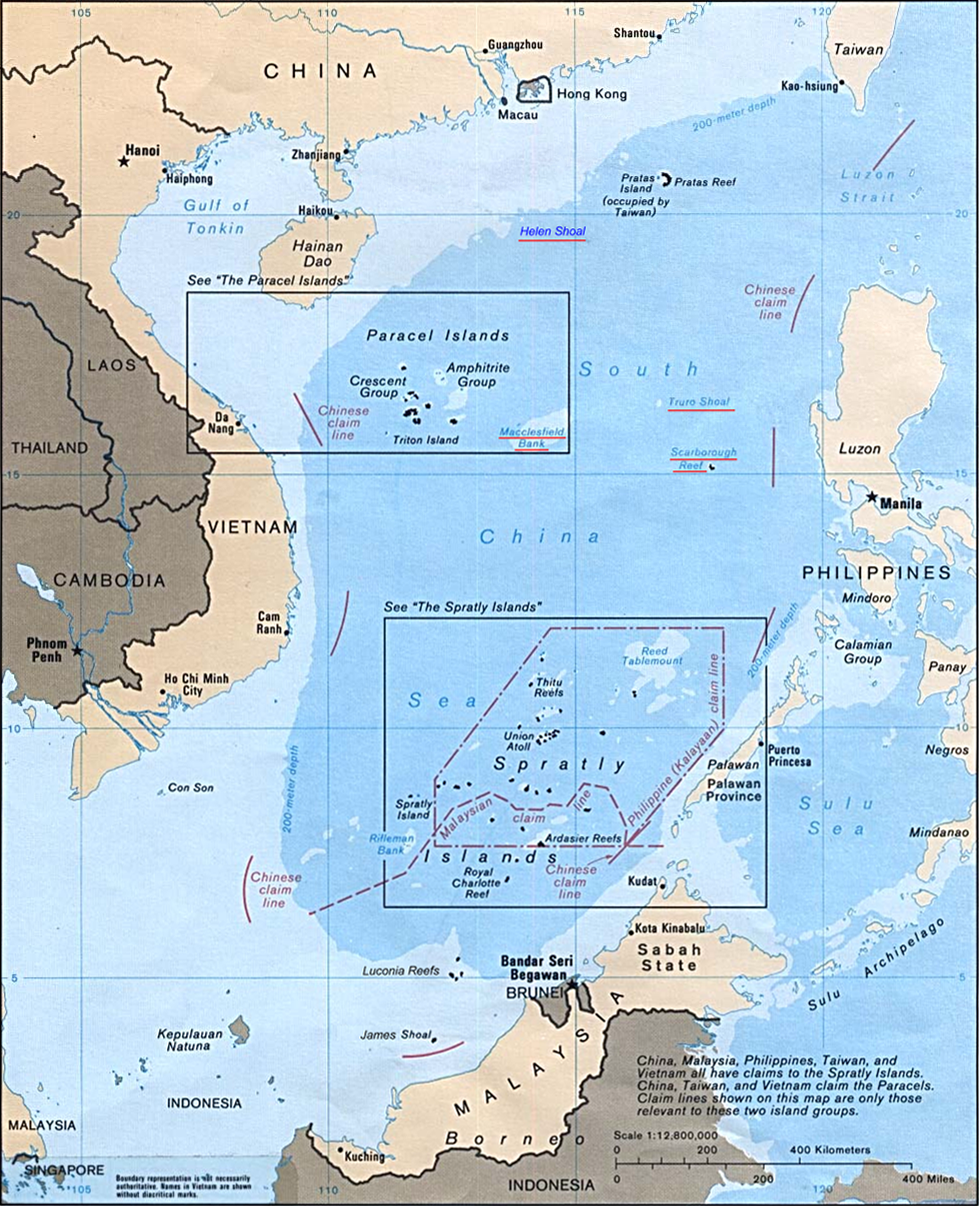
Map including James Shoal shown within the nine-dash line (above the fourth dash from the left)

The reef is claimed to be the southernmost territory of China by the People's Republic of China and Republic of China (Taiwan). China transliterated the British name as Zengmu Tan in 1935, and renamed it Zengmu Ansha in 1947. The People's Liberation Army Navy visited the reef in May 1981, again in 1994, and on 26 March 2013. China Marine Surveillance ships visited the reef and placed a sovereignty stele in the maritime area of the reef to mark it as Chinese territory on 26 March 1990, again in January 1992, on 15 January 1995, on 20 April 2010 and in 2012.

On 29 January 2014, Chinese state news agency Xinhua reported that three Chinese warships (one amphibious landing craft and two destroyers) returned to James Shoal to conduct military drills and perform an oath swearing ceremony. The Royal Malaysian Navy chief Tan Sri Abdul Aziz Jaafar denied the report, saying that the Chinese exercise took place hundreds of miles to the north in international waters.

Chinese students are taught and tested in schools that James Shoal is the southernmost point of Chinese territory, and that territory within the nine-dash line has always belonged to China, without any reference to the disputes over the islands and surrounding waters by neighbouring countries.

In July 2020, U.S. Secretary of State Michael Pompeo wrote concerning the claim:

The PRC has no lawful territorial or maritime claim to (or derived from) James Shoal, an entirely submerged feature only 50 nautical miles from Malaysia and some 1,000 nautical miles from China’s coast. James Shoal is often cited in PRC propaganda as the “southernmost territory of China.” International law is clear: An underwater feature like James Shoal cannot be claimed by any state and is incapable of generating maritime zones. James Shoal (roughly 20 meters below the surface) is not and never was PRC territory, nor can Beijing assert any lawful maritime rights from it.

As of September 2020, Chinese ships regularly patrolled near James Shoal.

== Oil and gas reserves ==
Active exploration and development of oil and gas fields by Malaysia has been taking place around the James Shoal since 2014, with several production facilities erected in the surrounding area. Malaysia has also been undertaking exploration for and production of hydrocarbon resources on a sustained basis in the area, effectively asserting jurisdiction over the area.

== See also ==
- South China Sea
- Territorial disputes in the South China Sea
- Wave shoaling
