= Oregon Equal Suffrage Amendment =

Constitutional amendment in Oregon granting women the right to vote

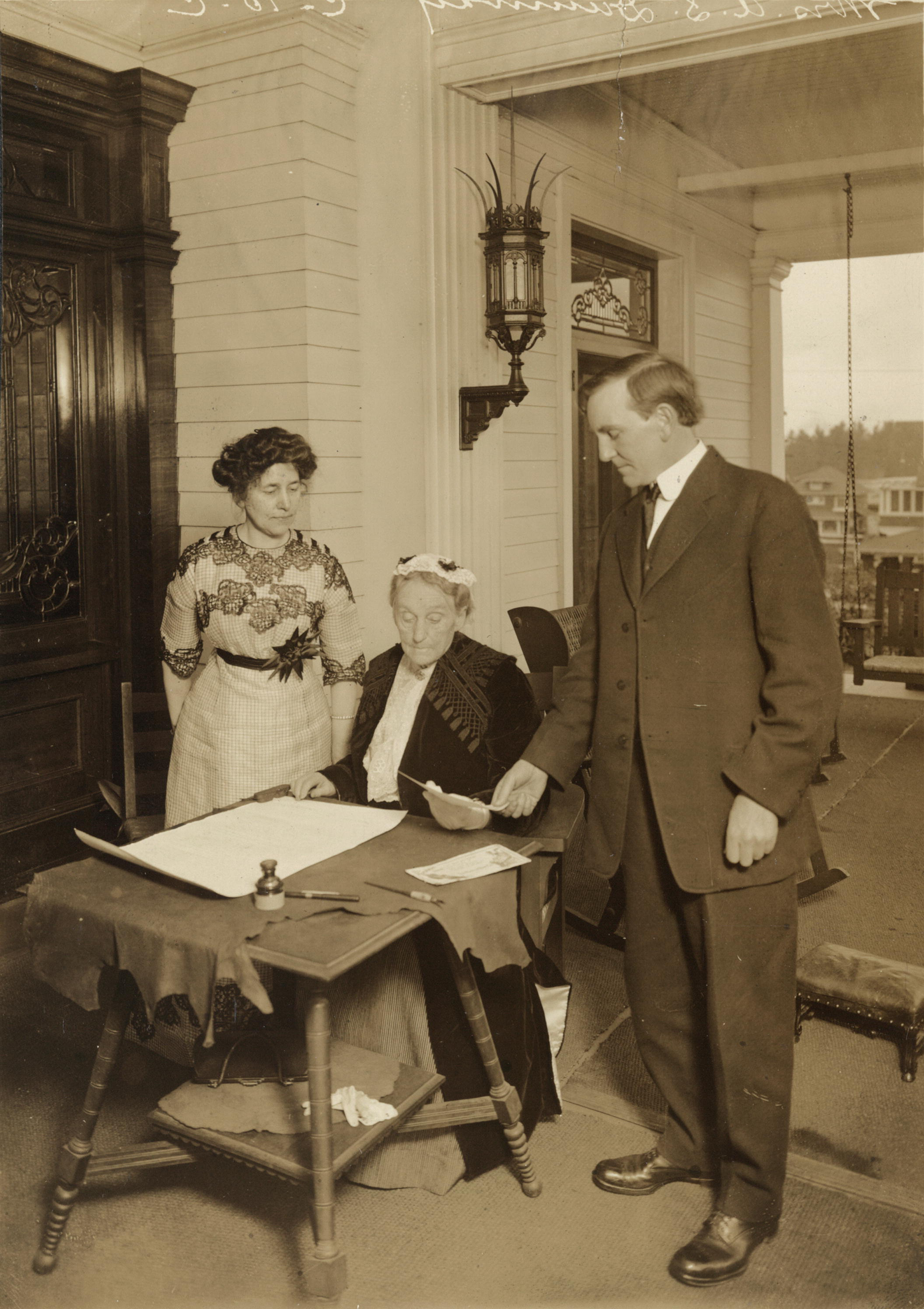
Abigail Scott Duniway signing the Oregon Equal Suffrage Amendment, Governor Oswald West standing behind her

The Oregon Equal Suffrage Amendment was an amendment to the constitution of the U.S. state of Oregon, establishing women's suffrage, which was passed by ballot initiative in 1912. The Oregon Suffrage Amendment was placed on the ballot several times between 1884 and 1912.

== History ==
Changes to the Constitution of Oregon could be made after the Oregon Legislative Assembly passed an amendment bill in both legislative houses. A women's suffrage amendment was passed by the Oregon Assembly in 1882. The amendment went to the voters in 1884, but it was defeated.

In 1900, the Oregon State Equal Suffrage Association urged the approval of the 1900 effort to ratify the amendment.

| year | type | "yes" votes | "no" votes | % "yes" |
|---|---|---|---|---|
| 1884 | referral | 11,223 | 28,176 | 28 |
| 1900 | referral | 26,255 | 28,402 | 48 |
| 1906 | initiative | 36,902 | 47,075 | 44 |
| 1908 | initiative | 36,858 | 58,670 | 39 |
| 1910 | initiative | 35,270 | 59,065 | 37 |
| 1912 | initiative | 61,265 | 57,104 | 52 |

Ballot measure #2 on the state's 1906 ballot was the "first attempt in American political history to amend the constitution of a state by the direct initiative of the people, and without any intervention by the legislature." The initiative failed, with 36,902 votes in favor and 47,075 against. The organization, Portland Women Opposed to Suffrage, worked on the 1906 campaign, urging local businessmen to lend their names to the fight against women's suffrage.

When the initiative was ratified in 1912, Oregon became the seventh state to extend the right to vote to women. Abigail Scott Duniway was a longtime advocate for women's suffrage in Oregon, and Governor Oswald West asked her to write and sign the equal suffrage proclamation.

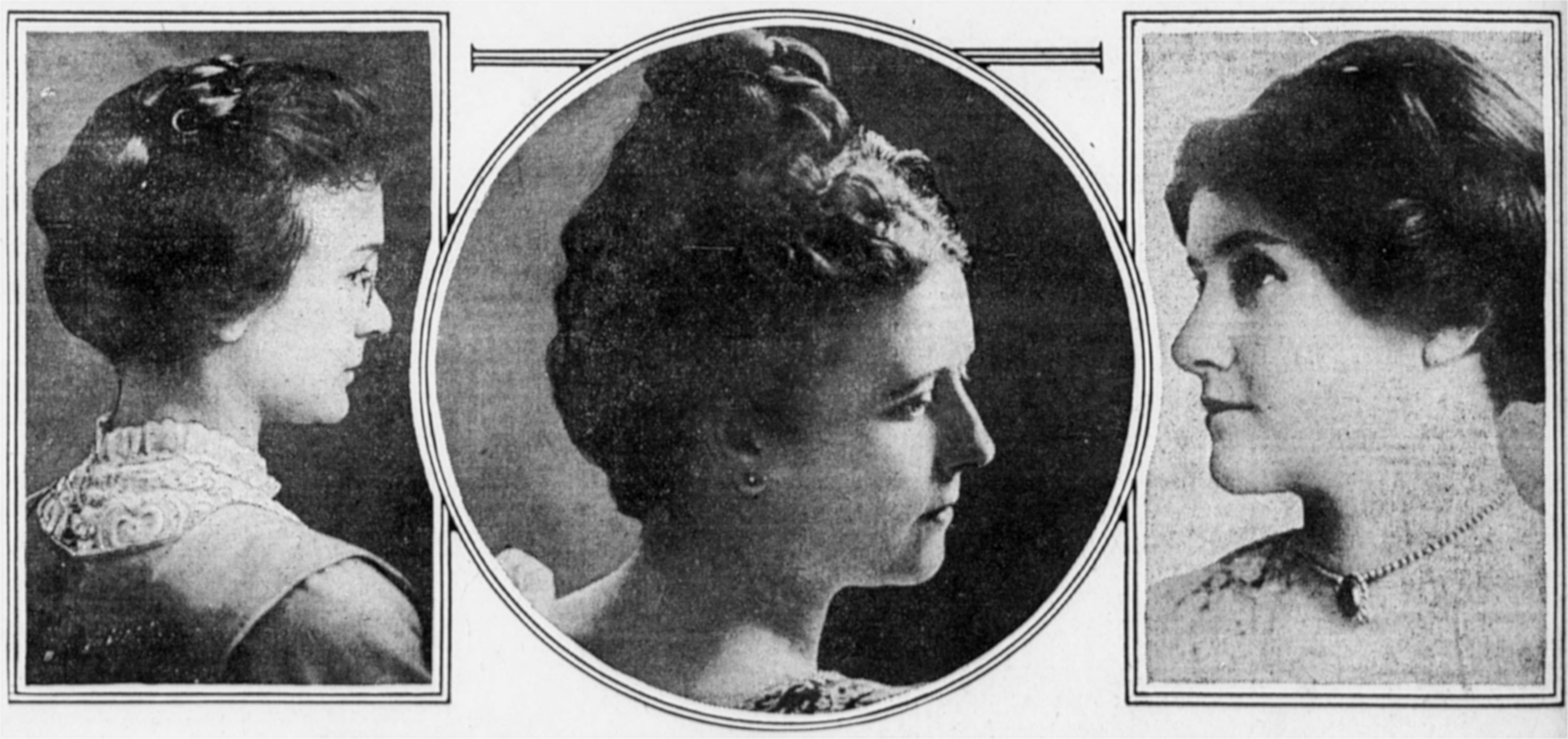
From left to right: Fern Hobbs, Kathryn Clarke and Marian Towne

In March 1915, the Philadelphia Evening Public Ledger honored three early women in public service in Oregon, in the wake of the passage of the equal suffrage amendment: Fern Hobbs (left) was private secretary to Governor Oswald West, and was later appointed by him to the newly-established State Industrial Accident Commission. Kathryn Clarke (center), was appointed to a vacancy in the State Senate by West. Due to doubts about the legality of the appointment, Clarke insisted on a special election, in which she defeated two male opponents. Marian Towne (right), the first woman ever elected to the Oregon Legislature, served in the Oregon House of Representatives.

== See also ==
- Chinese American women's suffrage in Oregon
