= Charlie Savage (journalist) =

American author and newspaper reporter (born 1975)

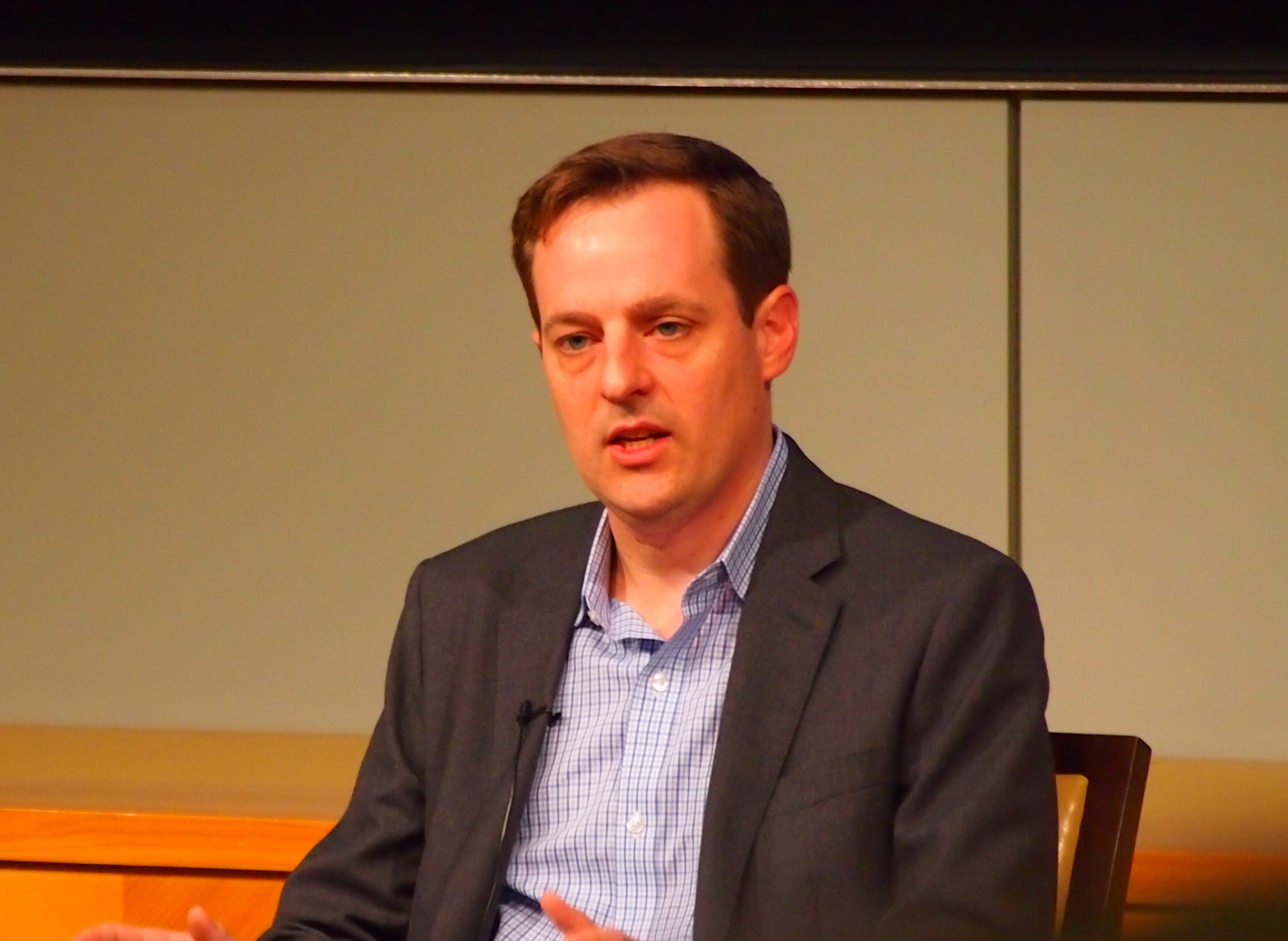
- Savage in 2015
- Born: Charles Savage; 1975 (age 50–51); Fort Wayne, Indiana, U.S.
- Education: Harvard University; Yale University
- Occupation: Journalist
- Spouse: Luiza Savage
- Children: 2
- Awards: Pulitzer Prize for National Reporting

Charles Savage is an American author and newspaper reporter with The New York Times. In 2007, while employed by The Boston Globe, he was a recipient of the Pulitzer Prize. He writes about national security legal policy, including presidential power, surveillance, drone strikes, torture, secrecy, leak investigations, military commissions, war powers, and the U.S. war on terrorism prison at Guantanamo Bay, Cuba.

== Early life and education ==
Born in Fort Wayne, Indiana, in 1975, Savage earned an undergraduate degree in English and American literature and language from Harvard College in 1998.

He earned a Master of Studies in Law (MSL) in 2003 from Yale Law School, where he was a Knight Foundation journalism fellow.

== Career ==
Savage is believed to have written the first mainstream media story about the Dark Side of the Rainbow, the practice of listening to Pink Floyd's album The Dark Side of the Moon while watching the film The Wizard of Oz, in August 1995, while working as a college intern at The Journal Gazette in Fort Wayne. He went on in 1999 to work as a staff writer for the Miami Herald, where, under the byline "Charles Savage", he covered local and state government and occasionally reviewed movies. He changed his byline to "Charlie Savage" when he moved to The Boston Globe's Washington Bureau in 2003 and kept it that way when he moved to the Times Washington Bureau in May 2008.

He is married to Luiza Chwialkowska Savage, the editorial director of events for Politico^{[2]} and a commentator on Canadian political news programs. He has taught a seminar at Georgetown University on national security and the Constitution.

Savage won the Pulitzer Prize for National Reporting for a 2006 series of articles in the Globe about Presidential Signing Statements and their use by the Bush administration as part of a broader effort to expand executive power. Those articles also won the Gerald R. Ford Foundation Prize for Distinguished Reporting on the Presidency and the American Bar Association's Silver Gavel Award.

In 2007, Savage published a book about the Bush administration's expansion of executive power entitled Takeover: The Return of the Imperial Presidency & the Subversion of American Democracy. The Constitution Project awarded the book its first Award for Constitutional Commentary. It also won the New York Public Library's Helen Bernstein Book Award for Excellence in Journalism and the National Council of Teachers of English's George Orwell Award for Distinguished Contributions to Honesty and Clarity in Public Language.

In 2015, Savage published a second book, an investigative history of the Obama administration's national security legal policy, called Power Wars: Inside Obama's Post-9/11 Presidency. While writing the book, he was a Woodrow Wilson Center Public Policy Fellow.

== Published work ==
- Savage, Charlie (2007). Takeover: The Return of the Imperial Presidency and the Subversion of American Democracy. New York: Little, Brown and Company. ISBN 9780316118040. OCLC 123029209.
- Savage, Charlie (2015). Power Wars: Inside Obama's Post-9/11 Presidency. New York: Little, Brown and Company. ISBN 9780316286572. OCLC 907941518. Ebook edition: Power Wars: The Relentless Rise of Presidential Authority and Secrecy.
