= Luconia Shoals =

Reef complex in the South China Sea

Disputed reefs and shoal
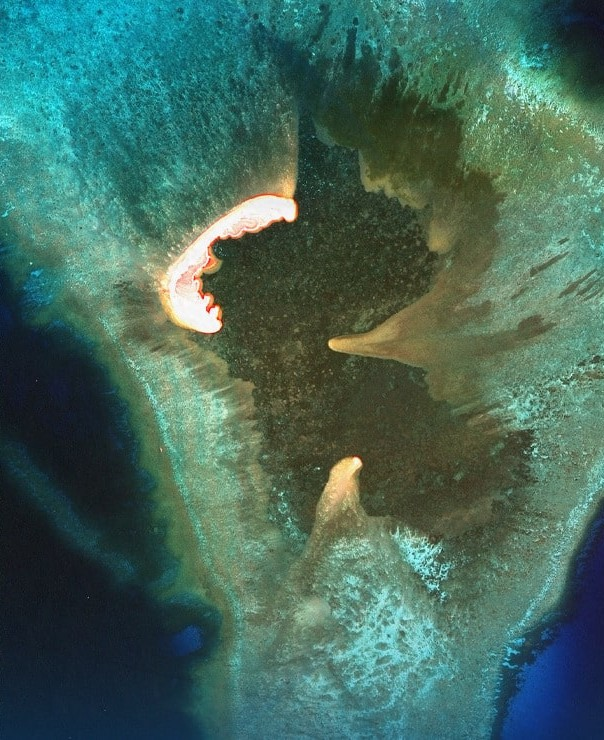
- Luconia Breakers, the only feature of the Luconia Shoals reef complex that is exposed at high tide

- Other names: Gugusan Beting Raja Jarum (Malay); Gugusan Beting Patinggi Ali (Malay) 北康暗沙 Běikāng ànshā (Chinese) 南康暗沙 Nánkāng ànshā (Chinese)

Geography
- Location: South China Sea
- Coordinates: 05°36′N 112°36′E

Administration
- Malaysia
- State: Sarawak, Division and District of Mukah, Subdistrict of Balingian

Claimed by
- Malaysia
- China
- Taiwan

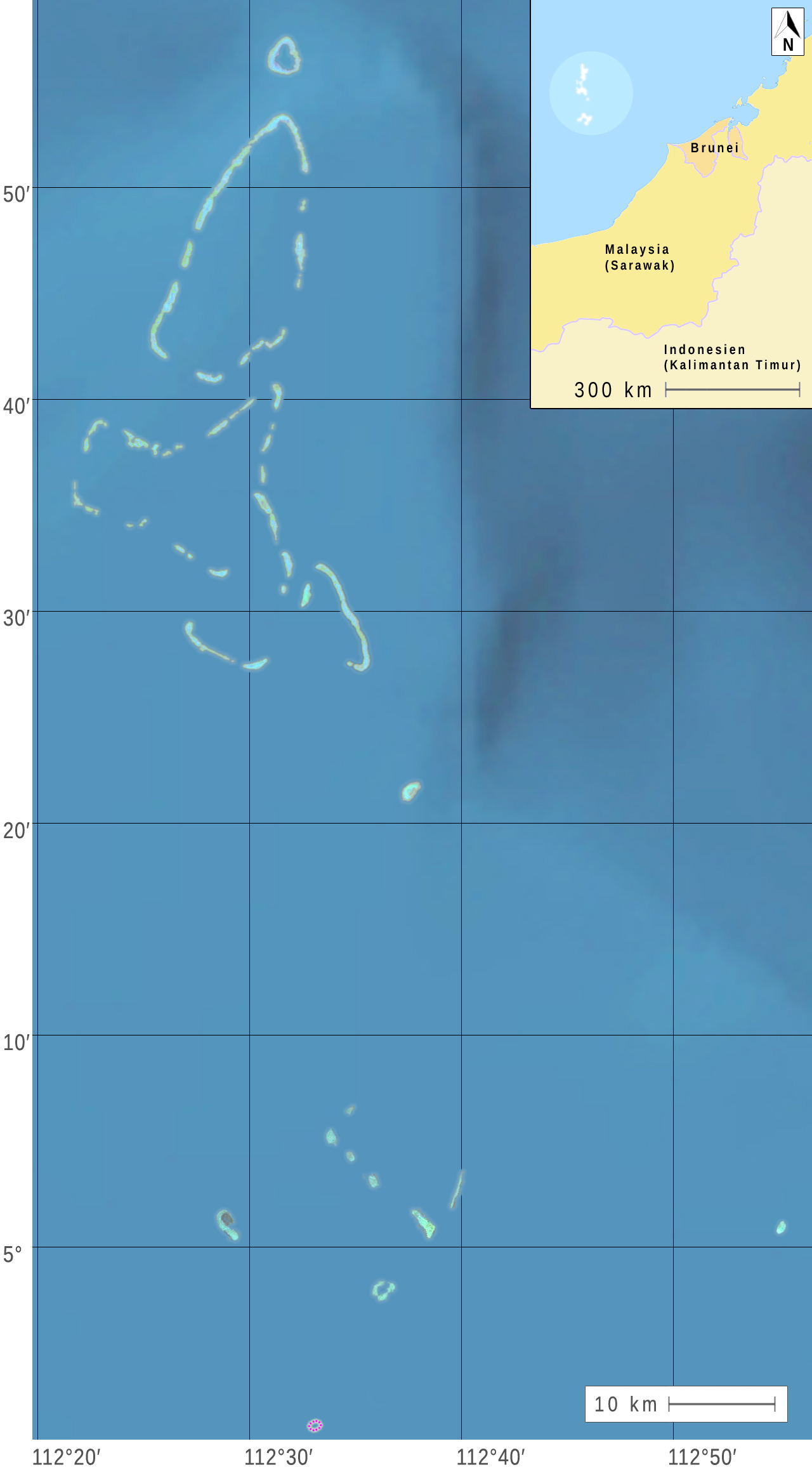
Landsat 7-derived sketch map of North and South Luconia Shoals

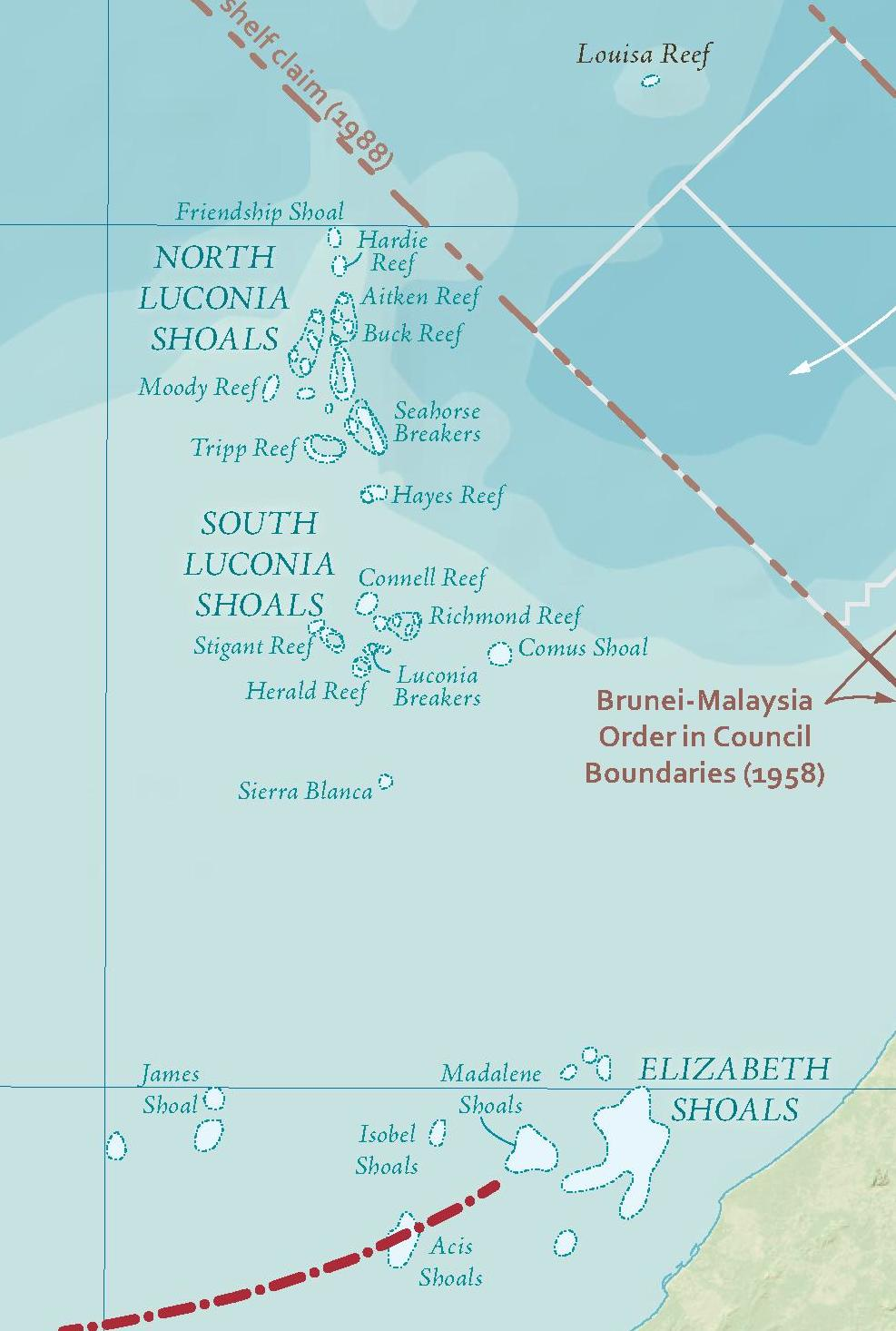
Extract from US Dept of State map also showing Louisa Reef and James Shoal

The Luconia Shoals, divided into the North and South Luconia Shoals, and sometimes known as the Luconia Reefs, are one of the largest reef and shoal complexes in the South China Sea. Some geographers classify the shoals as the southernmost part of the Spratly Islands. It is claimed by Malaysia, the People's Republic of China (mainland China), and the Republic of China (Taiwan).

The Luconia Shoals and its surrounds are currently administered by Malaysia. The shoals have been gazetted as the country's largest marine national park in 2018, and also host several major Malaysian oil and natural gas exploration projects in the surrounding waters.

== Name ==
Luconia Shoals are a group of submerged shoals and reefs in the South China Sea, which divided into North Luconia Shoals and South Luconia Shoals.

The name "Luconia" originally comes from an old name for Luzon Island in the Philippines, depicted in old Latin, Italian, and Portuguese maps as "Luçonia" or "Luconia". However, the direct origin of the name Luconia Shoals comes from the British ship Luconia, which discovered the shoals during its 1776 voyage. The ship's findings recorded the shoals at approximately 5°24′N, 112°30′E, with a depth of 1 1/2 fathoms (2.7 m), composed of hard rocks, and lying in a north-northeast to south-southwest direction. This discovery led to the shoals being named after the vessel.

=== North Luconia Shoals ===
Malaysia refers to North Luconia Shoals as Gugusan Beting Raja Jarum ('Raja Jarum Shoal Group'), named after Datu' Undi, a Minangkabau leader in Sarawak who adopted the title Raja Jarum. Both the People's Republic of China and the Republic of China (Taiwan) refer to North Luconia Shoals as Beikang Ansha (Chinese: 北康暗沙; pinyin: Běikāng Ànshā; lit. 'north-kang shoals').

=== South Luconia Shoals ===
Malaysia refers to South Luconia Shoals as Gugusan Beting Patinggi Ali ('Patinggi Ali Shoal Group'), named after Datu Patinggi Ali, a well-known Sarawak Malay leader who led resistance against the Brunei Empire. Both the People's Republic of China and the Republic of China (Taiwan) refer to South Luconia Shoals as Nankang Ansha (Chinese: 南康暗沙; pinyin: Nánkāng Ànshā; lit. 'south-kang shoals').

The Chinese name for the shoals, 'kang' (康) is actually the shortened form of 'Lu-kang-ni-ya' (盧康尼亞), which is a phonetic transliteration of the English name "Luconia".

Currently, neither Malaysia, People's Republic of China (mainland China) nor Republic of China (Taiwan) has an official general name for the entire Luconia Shoals.

== Location ==
The shoals lie around 100 kilometres (62 mi) off the Sarawak coast of Borneo, inside the exclusive economic zone (EEZ) of Malaysia, and around 2,000 kilometres (1,200 mi) from mainland China. The shoals are either part of the Spratly Islands, or southeast of what some sources consider to be the southernmost members of the Spratly Islands, such as Louisa Reef. Extending over an area of several thousand square kilometres, both the north and south groups of the shoals are permanently submerged at depths of 5 to 40 metres (16 to 131 ft) below sea level, with the exception of Luconia Breakers. There are extensive oil and natural gas resources under the seabed in this area, which is also home to various fish including manta rays, wrasse, and grouper. The shoals are also where the British barque Viscount Melbourne was wrecked on 5 January 1842.

== Features ==
Feature	Malaysian	Chinese (Trad./Simp.)	Coordinates	Depth metres
North Luconia Shoals	Gugusan Beting Raja Jarum	Běikāng ànshā (北康暗沙)		
Friendship Shoal	Beting Rentap	Méngyì ànshā (盟誼暗沙/盟谊暗沙)	5°57′N 112°32′E	8.2
Hardie Reef	Terumbu Asun	Hǎikāng ànshā (海康暗沙)	5°56′N 112°31′E	5.1
Aitken Reef	Terumbu Datuk Landih	Yìjìng Jiāo (義淨礁/义净礁)	5°54′N 112°33′E	9.4
Buck Reef	Terumbu Linggir	Fǎxiǎn ànshā (法顯暗沙/法显暗沙)	5°45′N 112°33′E	4.9
Moody Reef	Terumbu Permaisuri	Kāngxī ànshā (康西暗沙)	5°38′N 112°22′E	7.3
Seahorse Breakers	Hempasan Dang Ajar	Nán'ān Jiāo (南安礁)	5°32′N 112°35′E	2
Tripp Reef	Terumbu Litong	Běi'ān Jiāo (北安礁)	5°39′N 112°32′E	3.7
Hayes Reef	Terumbu Lang Ngindang	Nánpíng Jiāo (南屏礁)	5°22′N 112°38′E	<0
South Luconia Shoals	Gugusan Beting Patinggi Ali	Nánkāng ànshā (南康暗沙)		
Stigant Reef	Terumbu Sahap	Hǎi'ān Jiāo (海安礁)	5°02′N 112°30′E	4.6
Connell Reef	Terumbu Dato Talip	Yǐnbō ànshā (隱波暗沙/隐波暗沙)	5°06′N 112°34′E	1.8
Herald Reef	Terumbu Saji	Hǎiníng Jiāo (海寧礁/海宁礁)	4°57′N 112°37′E	2
Comus Shoal	Beting Merpati	Huānlè ànshā (歡樂暗沙/欢乐暗沙)	5°01′N 112°56′E	8.2
Richmond Reef	Terumbu Balingian	Tánmén Jiāo (潭門礁/潭门礁)	5°04′N 112°43′E	3.6
Luconia Breakers	Hempasan Bantin	Qióngtái Jiāo (瓊台礁/琼台礁)	5°01′N 112°38′E	>0
Sierra Blanca Reef	Beting Batu Puteh	Chéngpíng Jiāo (澄平礁)	4°51′N 112°32′E	4.6

Sierra Blanca Reef is sometimes listed separately from South Luconia Shoals, situated about 12 miles southwestward of the latter. Its least depth is given as 2½ fathoms. Besides, Beting Batu Puteh is not the official name released by Malaysia for Sierra Blanca Reef, but a name used informally.

Luconia Breakers, once only partially exposed at low tide, has now become permanently above water even at high tide. Satellite images have shown growth and massive man-made transformation in Luconia Shoals since 2014. It remains unclear whether the changes were carried out by China or Malaysia.

== Satellite Images ==
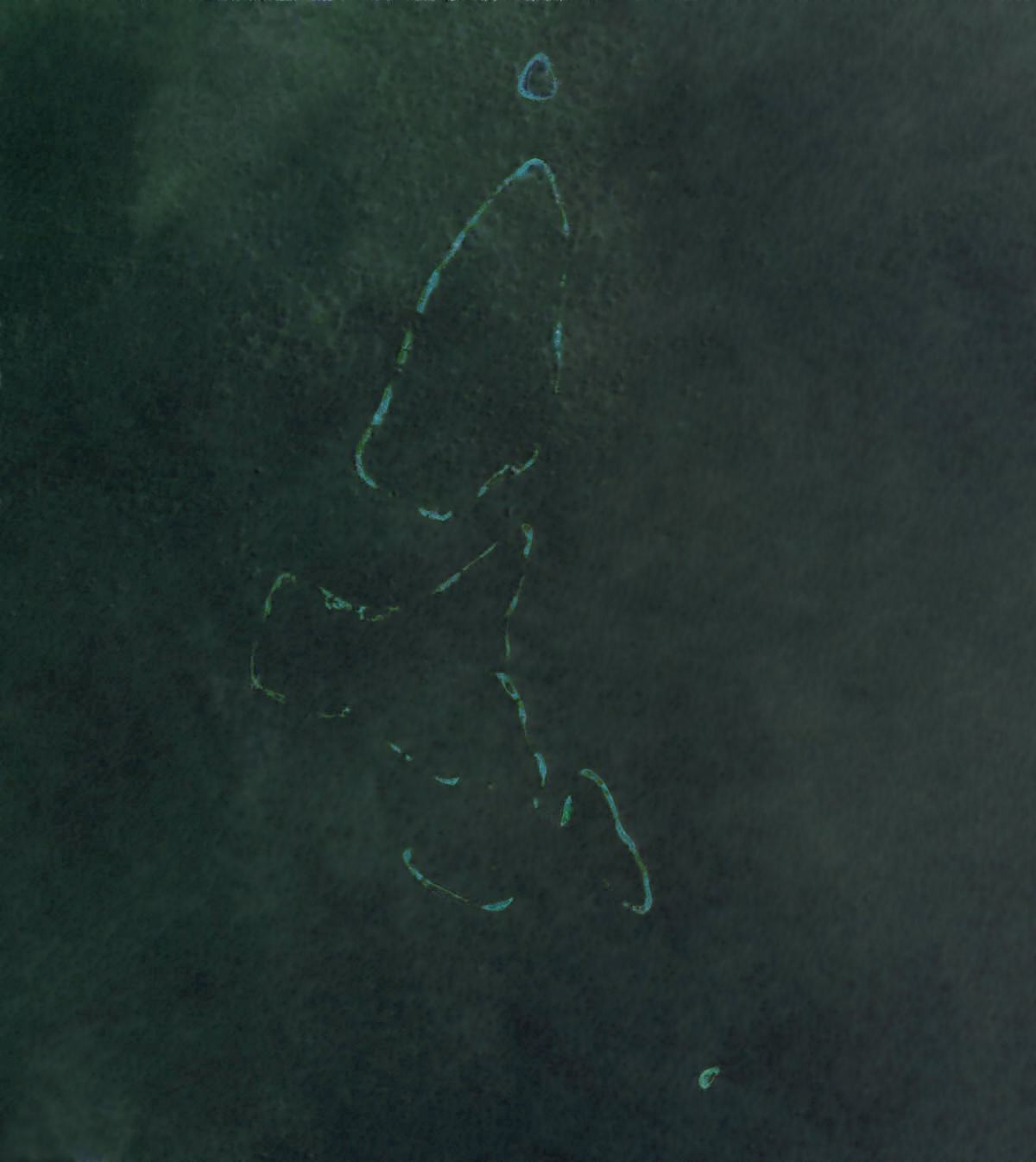
Landsat 7 image of North Luconia Shoals

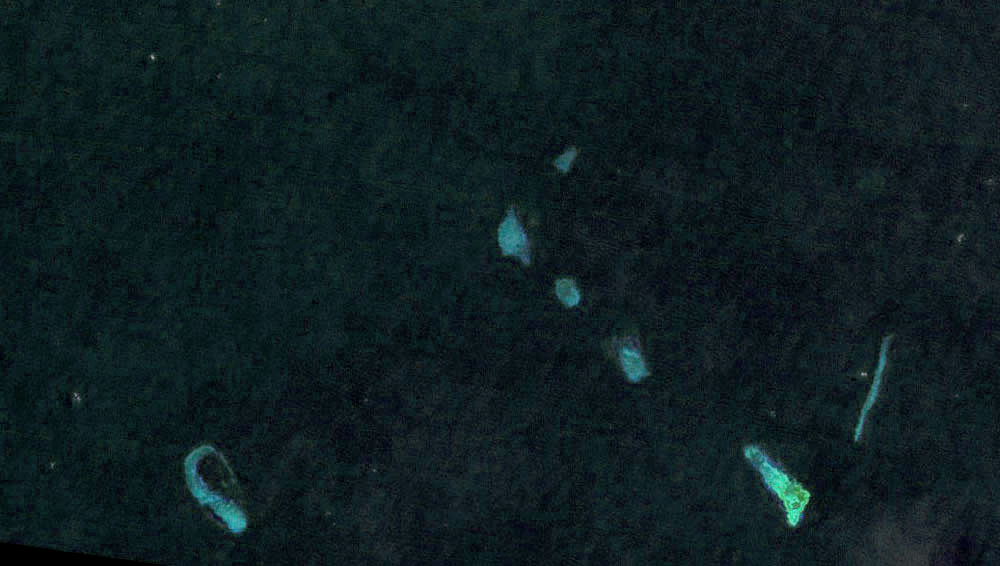
Landsat 7 image of South Luconia Shoals
not showing Herald Reef 5 km southwest of Luconia Breakers

== Territorial disputes ==
The Luconia shoals are administered by Malaysia, and are claimed by the Republic of China (Taiwan) and the People's Republic of China.

=== Malaysia ===
The shoals are administered by Malaysia, and the Royal Malaysian Navy and Malaysian Maritime Enforcement Agency maintains a 24/7 presence in the area to monitor the shoals. Malaysia's Fisheries Research Institute has conducted studies on the area since 2004. Malaysia organises an annual International Deep Sea Fishing Tournament on the shoals with participants departing from the Marina Bay in Miri and heading up to the area for 3 days. The participant who catches the biggest fish is proclaimed the winner of the tournament.

On 31 August 2015, amateur marine archaeologist Captain Hans Berekoven with his wife and a team of marine researchers, as well as the Sarawak Museum curator, went to the shoals to plant a Malaysian flag. Berekoven said the move was important to warn China to back down, and to urge the Malaysian government to take a serious look into the archaeological history of the area because the Sunda Shelf may have hosted a civilisation 12,000 years ago.

=== China ===
In June 2015, Malaysian authorities detected a China Coast Guard vessel entering the area. It appears to be anchored at the shoals, about 150 kilometres north of Malaysian Borneo—well inside the 200 nautical miles (370 km; 230 mi) exclusive economic zone claimed by Malaysia. The Chinese vessel has been warned to leave the area and is monitored closely by the Royal Malaysian Navy. Malaysia lodged a protest over China's incursion into its waters, as Chinese ships had been in Malaysian waters for more than two years. In a statement in 2015 by a Minister in the Prime Minister's Department, Shahidan Kassim, he said "We have never received any official claims from them (China) and they said the island (Beting Patinggi Ali) belongs to them, but the country is 1,400 kilometres (870 mi) away. We are taking diplomatic action but in whatever approach, they have to get out of our national waters". The Malaysian government has since sent diplomatic notes every week to protest against the intrusion. There have also been reports that crews aboard the Chinese vessel threatened to shoot local Malaysian fishermen who attempted to fish in the area.

On 31 March 2016, Malaysia summoned the Chinese ambassador in Kuala Lumpur to protest the presence of around 100 Chinese fishing boats at Luconia Shoals. Until March, the Malaysian government rarely rebuked China in public to avoid disturbances to Sino-Malay relations as Beijing emerges as the Malaysian economy's main investor. Kuala Lumpur has "consistently played down China's activities in our territories", said Wan Saiful Wan Jan, chief executive of the Institute for Democracy and Economic Affairs, a Malaysian think tank. "This could be to protect our commercial interest, or it could also be to avoid the public...realising how useless our defences are".

== See also ==
- South China Sea Islands
- List of islands in the South China Sea
- Territorial disputes in the South China Sea
