= Sylvia McGuire Thompson =

American politician and suffragist (1876–1950)

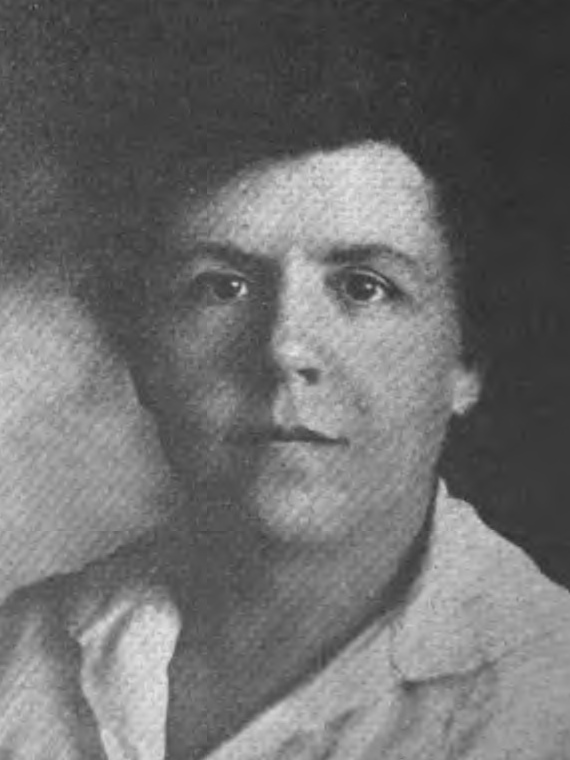

Member of the Oregon Senate
- In office 1916–1922

Personal details
- Born: April 13, 1876 Louisville, Kentucky, US
- Died: February 22, 1950 (aged 73) Troutdale, Oregon, US
- Party: Democratic
- Spouse: Alexander Thompson

Sylvia McGuire Thompson (April 13, 1876 – February 22, 1950) was an American socialist politician and suffragist. She was a two-term Democratic state representative for Oregon and the president of the Portland Federation of Women's Clubs.

== Biography ==
Thompson was born on April 13, 1876, in Louisville, Kentucky. She grew up in Indiana and then relocated to Portland, Oregon. This was where she met her husband, Alexander Thompson, whom she married in 1911. Thomson grew up in a period when the movement for women's right to vote and hold public office was gaining traction. She actively participated in the movement and was the head of the Wasco County suffrage campaign in 1912. She supported the candidacy of Woodrow Wilson during the presidential election of 1912 and she became the first woman to be a member of the Democratic National Campaign Committee in United States history.

In 1916, Thompson was elected to the state legislature, representing Hood River and Wasco counties. She was the third woman to hold an elective position in the Oregon legislature, following the election of Marian Towne and Kathryn Clarke, who both served single terms. She served two terms and during her tenure, she was the only female representative in the state legislature.

Thompson was the sponsor of the House Joint Resolution 1, which ratified the Nineteenth Amendment to the US Constitution, allowing woman suffrage. By August 1920, women's suffrage was granted through the 19th Amendment. Known for her public speaking ability, Thompson was one of the first women to take advantage of the opportunity. She is credited for passing the eight-month minimum school bill, the teachers' minimum salary, the elementary education tax, and the state's child welfare law.

Thompson died on February 22, 1950, aged 73, at Troutdale Tuberculosis Hospital.
