= Luiza Savage =

- Occupation: Journalist
- Spouse: Charlie Savage

Luiza Chwialkowska Savage (styled Luiza Ch. Savage) is the executive editor for growth at Politico and a contributor to Canadian political news programs on CTV, CPAC, and CBC News Network. She is married to The New York Times' Washington correspondent Charlie Savage.

A former Washington bureau chief for Maclean's, Savage is also the writer/producer of documentaries on the Keystone XL pipeline and the effort to build a new bridge linking Detroit, Michigan and Windsor, Ontario.

Born in Poland, Savage grew up in Canada. She graduated from Harvard College with a bachelor's degree in economics and earned a master's degree from Yale Law School while on a Knight Foundation journalism fellowship.
