= Marian B. Towne =

American politician (1880–1966)

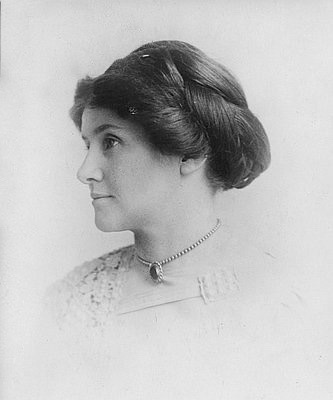
Marian Towne

Marian B. Towne (December 6, 1880 – February 16, 1966) was an American politician of the Democratic Party who was the first woman to serve in the Oregon House of Representatives. She was elected to that office in 1914, serving until 1917. Towne was born in Sterlingville, Oregon and died in Phoenix, Oregon.

== Early life ==
Towne was born in Sterlingville, on December 6, 1880. Her family later moved to Phoenix, where her father, William Francis Towne, was a successful merchant. After Towne graduated from the local school, she served as assistant county clerk in Medford. She began studying law, and left Oregon to attend the University of Michigan Law School for a term in 1908. She used her legal studies to evaluate state laws that might affect Jackson County. This experience led her to run for the legislature.

== Political career ==
1914 was the first year women were eligible to vote and run for office in Oregon. The mayor of Medford endorsed her candidacy, as well as the publisher of the Mail Tribune, George Putnam. Towne was elected to serve during the 1915 Oregon legislative session. She served alongside Kathryn Clarke, the first female Oregon State Senator. She served on the House Education, Health and Public Morals, and Salaries committees. Among the bills she introduced was a bill to increase school funding and expand the minimum school term from six to eight months. She also spoke in defense of the Oregon Girl's Industrial Home. She did not win reelection in 1916.

== Military career ==
In 1917, at the start of World War I, Towne volunteered for service the U.S. Naval Reserve, the first time women were allowed to do so. She served as a clerk at the Bremerton Naval Yard, where she applied for a regular commission in the U.S. Navy. Her application was rejected. She was discharged from the Naval Reserve in 1920.

== Later life ==
Towne worked for the state of Washington for the Department of Health, the State Bar of California and the California Public Welfare Department. She returned to Oregon in the late 1950s; she died in Phoenix on February 16, 1966 at age 85.

== See also ==
- Oregon Equal Suffrage Amendment
- Sylvia McGuire Thompson, Oregon politician who became first female member of the Democratic National Campaign Committee
- Women in the United States Navy
