= Kathryn Clarke (politician) =

First woman to serve in the Oregon Senate

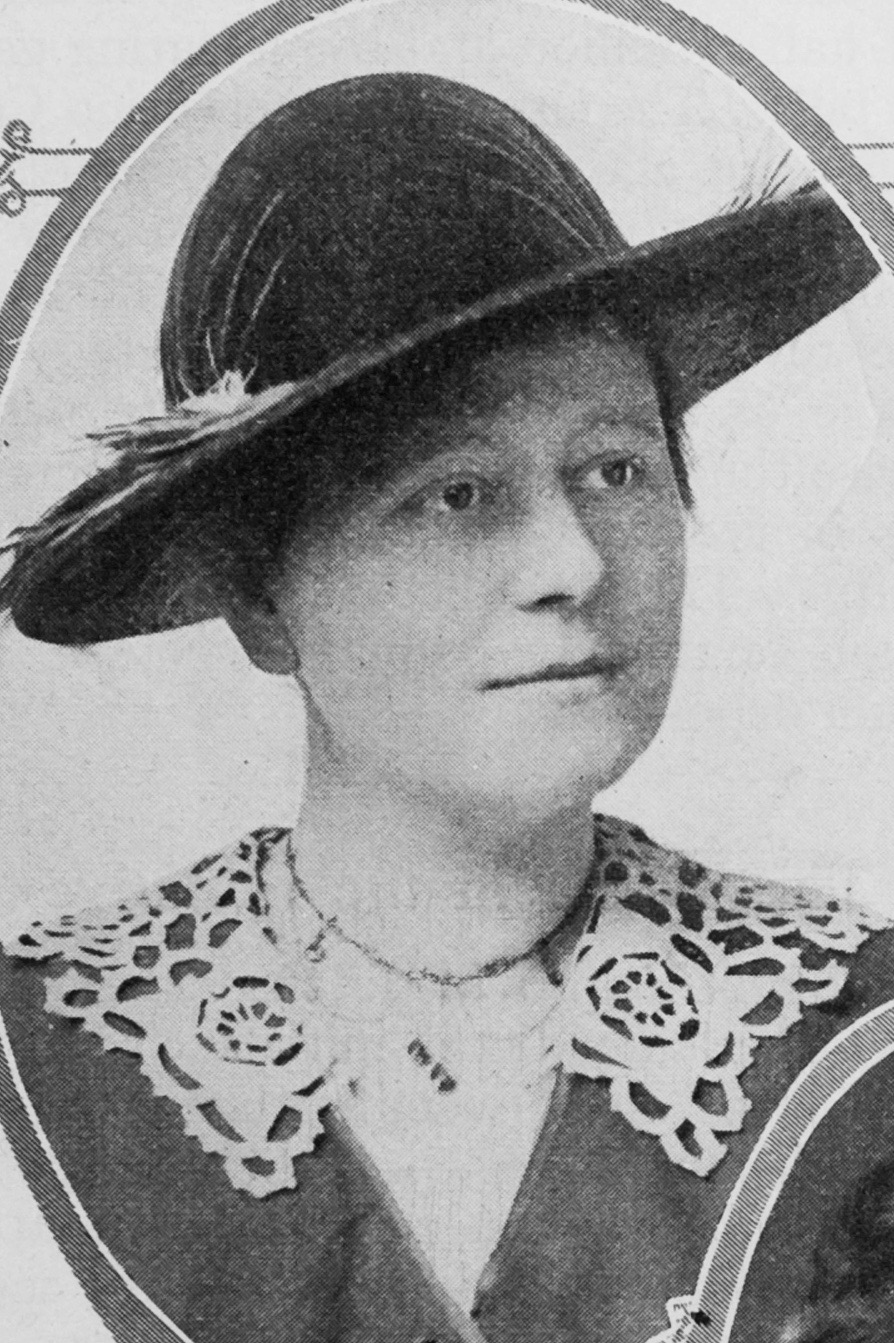

Member of the Oregon Senate
- In office January 21, 1915 – January 1917
- Preceded by: George Neuner Jr.

Personal details
- Born: 1873 Gardiner, Oregon, United States
- Died: August 19, 1940 (aged 66–67) Pasadena, California, United States
- Party: Republican

Kathryn Clarke (1873 – August 19, 1940) was an American politician, and the first woman to serve in the Oregon Senate.

== Biography ==
Clarke was born in 1873 to John Clarke and Catherine McGregor Clarke in Gardiner, Oregon. In January 1915, Senator George Neuner Jr. resigned to serve as district attorney, so governor Oswald West, the cousin of Clarke, set to appoint a replacement. He initially offered the post to Dexter Rice, a judge, but Rice declined. A special election was held on January 20, which Clarke won by 76 votes. Clarke served until January 1917.

== See also ==
- Marian B. Towne, first woman to serve in the Oregon House of Representatives
- Sylvia McGuire Thompson, Oregon politician who became first female member of the Democratic National Campaign Committee
