= Lizzie Weeks =

African American activist in Oregon (1879–1976)

Lizzie Koontz Weeks (1879 – September 20, 1976) was an African American activist in Portland, Oregon.

She was a commissioner for the National Emancipation Commemorative Society in 1912. In 1914 she was elected president of the Colored Women's Republican Club. The organization was created to support the candidacy of Robert A. Booth, C. N. McArthur, and other Republican political candidates. The club also organized voter registration drives to help black women become registered voters and held candidate talks to inform Black voters about political issues.

== Life ==
Lizzie Koontz was born in Washington D.C. In 1904, at the age of 27, she married George W. Weeks, age 37, who worked as a packer for Prael, Hegele and Company, a kitchen and tableware store in Portland. Weeks was a member of Portland's Bethel African Methodist Church and participated in fund-raising activities for the congregation. In 1912, she was one of the five commissioners representing Oregon on the National Emancipation Commemorative Society to recognize the fiftieth anniversary signing of the Emancipation Proclamation.

== Career ==
Weeks was a social worker in Portland where she was the first African American woman to work at the Multnomah County juvenile Frazier Detention Home. She also became a probation officer for the Juvenile Court and, in 1920, for the Multnomah County Court of Domestic Relations. In the fall of 1914, in the first national election after the success of woman's suffrage in Oregon, Weeks helped organize a meeting in Portland of African American women who supported the Republican Party, the party of most black Americans from the time of the American Civil War until the Great Depression. The group formed the Colored Women's Republican Club and elected Weeks, who was already a registered voter, as president. At the conclusion of the meeting, the group went to the Multnomah County courthouse so that those who were not yet registered could do so. In 1918, Weeks was a candidate for Republican precinct committee members.
