= S. K. Chan =

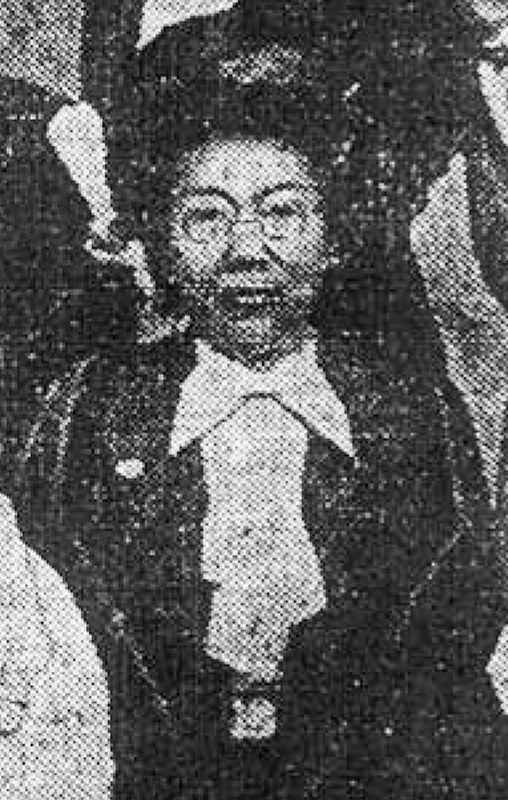
Picture of S.K. Chan

S.K. Chan was the President of the Chinese American Equal Suffrage Society in Portland, Oregon, United States.

== Suffrage activism ==
On April 11,1912, S.K. Chan acted in response to woman suffrage movements occurring in China, the United States, and other Pacific Northwest countries. She and seven Portland Chinese women attended a banquet in honor of La Reine Helen Baker, a magazine writer and author, at the Portland Hotel as part of 150 equal suffrage workers.

Along with S.K. Chan, the other six Chinese women involved were her two daughters, Bertie and Fannie Chan, Mrs. Ng Tong, Tong's two daughters, Ida and Beulah Tong, and Mrs. Herbert Low.

The Oregonian newspaper reported on the event on April 12, 1912, stating that "The presence of the Chinese women at a banquet with white women is unique."

During the course of the banquet, S.K. Chan addressed the other women and made a speech voicing her belief on women's rights and political equality with men. Speaking in her native tongue, her speech was interpreted by one of her daughters, Bertie Chan.

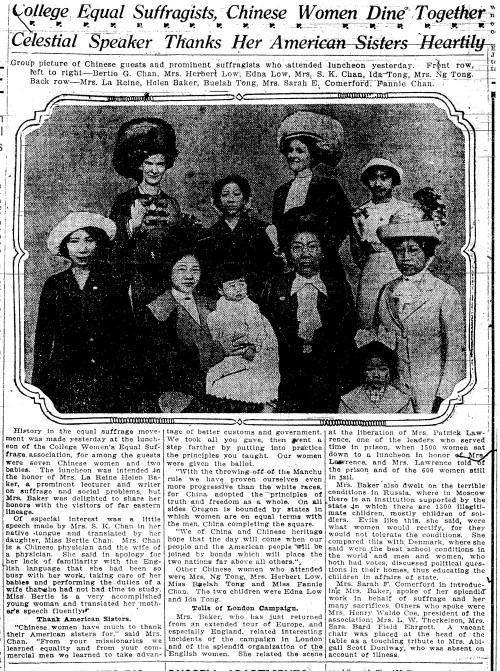
Group Picture of Chinese Women Banquet Participants and Mrs. La Reine Helen Baker
