= Viscount Melbourne (1835 ship) =

History

United Kingdom
- Name: Viscount Melbourne
- Namesake: William Lamb, 2nd Viscount Melbourne
- Owner: Marjoribanks
- Builder: James Edwards, South Shields
- Launched: 19 December 1835
- Fate: Wrecked on 5 January 1842

General characteristics
- Tons burthen: 670 (bm)
- Length: 150 ft (45.7 m)
- Beam: 47 ft (14.3 m)
- Sail plan: Barque

Viscount Melbourne was launched in Shields in 1835. She was the largest merchant vessel built in Shields to that time. Some London merchants experienced in the trade with India had her built expressly for the trade with China.

Viscount Melbourne was wrecked on 5 January 1842 on the Luconia Shoals, in the China Seas. All on board abandoned ship in five boats, two of which were reported missing. She was on a voyage from Singapore to Macao with a cargo of cotton, rice, and saltpetre.
