= Louisa Reef =

Brunei-controlled disputed reef in the South China Sea

Disputed reef
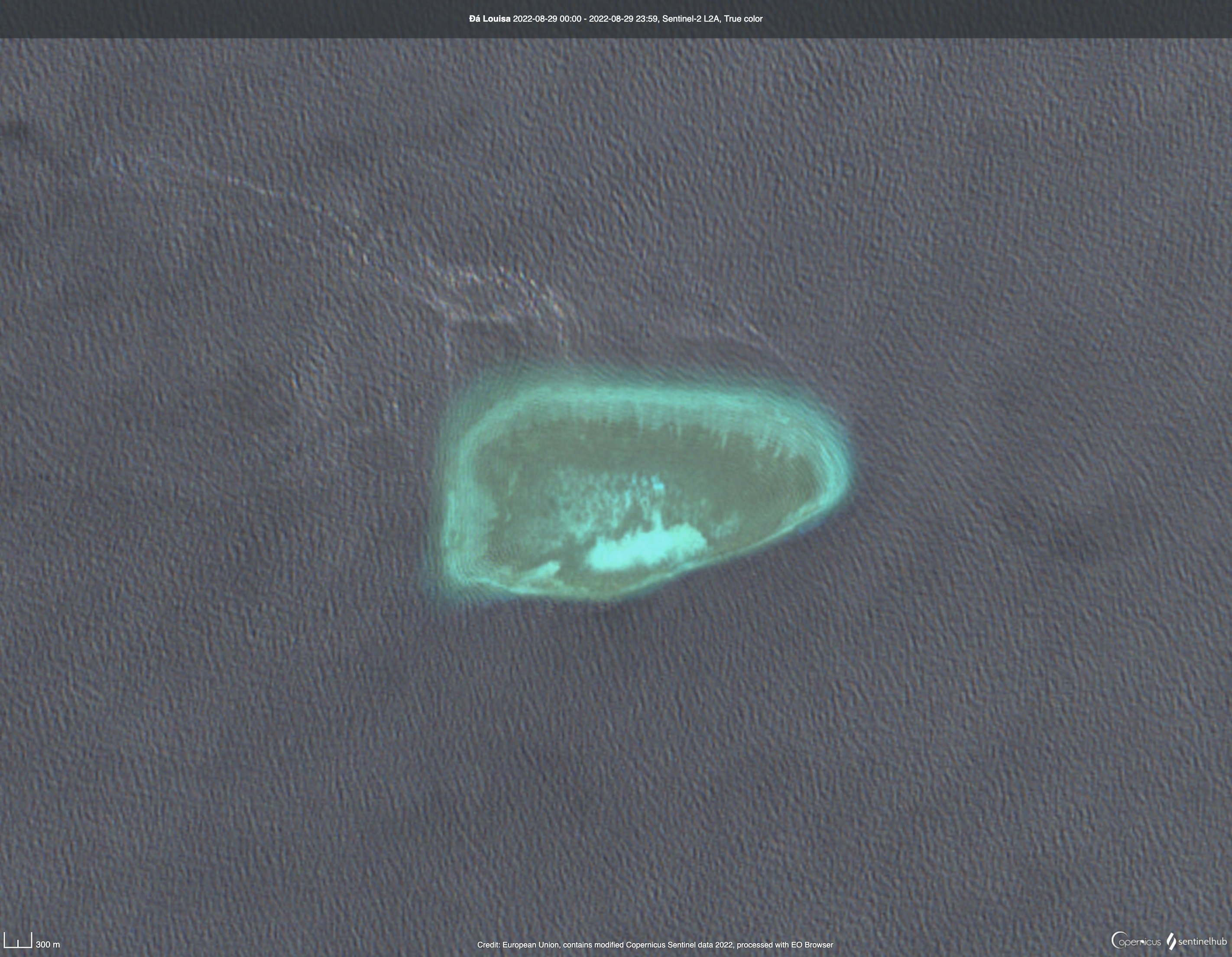
- Louisa Reef

- Location within Spratly Islands
- Other names: Terumbu Semarang Barat Kecil (Malay) 南通礁 Nántōng Jiāo (Chinese)

Geography
- Location: South China Sea
- Coordinates: 6°20′7″N 113°16′47″E
- Archipelago: Spratly Islands

Claimed by
- Brunei
- EEZ: Brunei zone
- China
- City: Sansha, Hainan
- Taiwan
- Municipality: Cijin, Kaohsiung
- Vietnam
- District: Trường Sa, Khánh Hòa

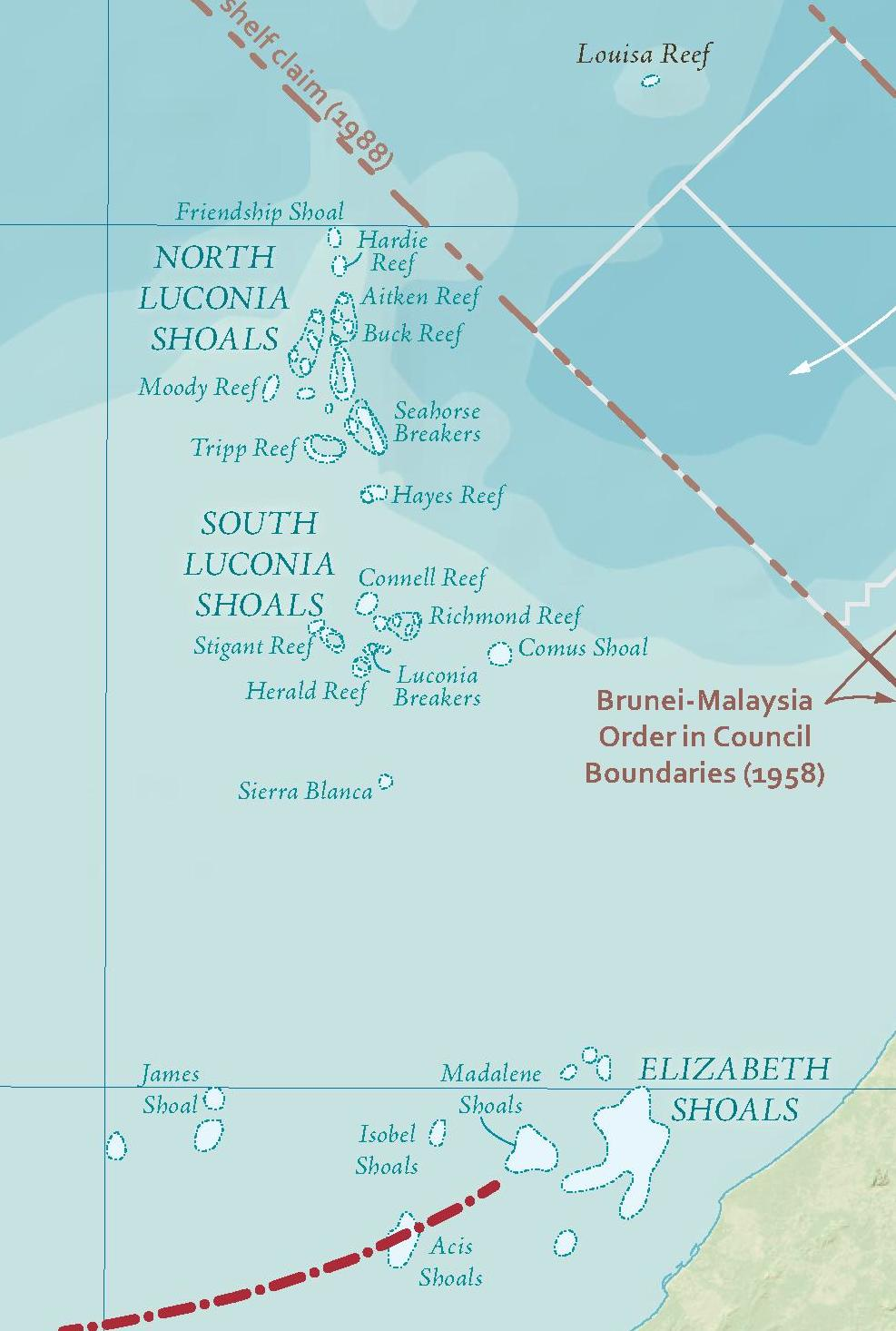
Extract from US Department of State map showing Louisa Reef (top right)

Louisa Reef (Brunei Malay: Terumbu Semarang Barat Kecil;Mandarin Chinese: 南通礁; pinyin: Nántōng Jiāo) is a coral reef in the southern reaches of the Spratly Islands in the South China Sea. As is the case with the islands, ownership of the reef is disputed, with Malaysia, Brunei, China and other nations claiming it as their territory.

== Description ==
The reef lies 125 nautical miles (232 km; 144 mi) off the coast of Brunei. Its dimensions are 1.2 miles (1.9 km) east to west and 0.6 miles (0.97 km) north to south. At high tide, little of the reef is above water.

The majority of what Brunei considers its offshore oil reserves lies in the Louisa Reef area.

== Disputed ownership ==
In 1979, the Malaysian government published the Map Showing the Territorial Waters and Continental Shelf Boundaries of Malaysia, which depicted the reef as its territory. Malaysia explicitly claimed in 1983 and 1988 that the reef is on its continental shelf and is therefore its possession; however, the continental shelf is off the coast of Brunei. To support its claim, Malaysia built an obelisk on the eastern submerged portion. In 1995, Malaysia and Brunei agreed to begin talks about their territorial claims, but apparently without a satisfactory resolution; both parties contracted with different consortiums to explore for undersea gas and oil, but in March 2003 a Bruneian patrol boat intercepted a Murphy Oil drilling ship, while in April of the same year, two Malaysian warships prevented a chartered vessel from conducting a survey.

China has also staked its claim, occupying parts of the Spratley Islands—including the reef—in 1988. The Spratleys fall on China's side of the nine-dash line of competing claims.

Other claimants to portions or all of the Spratleys include Taiwan and Vietnam.
