= List of shipwrecks in October 1836 =

The list of shipwrecks in October 1836 includes ships sunk, foundered, wrecked, grounded, or otherwise lost during October 1836.

== 1 October ==
List of shipwrecks: 1 October 1836
Ship	State	Description
Auguste	France	The ship was driven ashore at Calais. She was on a voyage from Newcastle upon Tyne, Northumberland to Rouen, Seine-Inférieure. Auguste was refloated on 6 October and taken in to Calais.
Chester	United States	The ship was abandoned in the Atlantic Ocean (47°00′N 43°15′W). Her 150 passengers, and her crew were rescued; some of them by Perseverance (United Kingdom). She was on a voyage from Liverpool, Lancashire, United Kingdom to New York.
Delphin	Prussia	The ship was driven ashore at Skagen, Denmark. Her crew were rescued. She was on a voyage from Memel to Boulogne, Pas-de-Calais, France.
Esperance	France	The ship was driven ashore at "Tranche". She was on a voyage from Bordeaux, Gironde to Martinique. Esperance was later refloated, but drove ashore on the coast of Aunis.
Lunenburg	(United Kingdom of Great Britain and Ireland) British North America	The ship was driven ashore at Crosby Point, Lancashire. She was on a voyage from Nova Scotia to Liverpool.
Star	United Kingdom	The ship was wrecked at Llanrhystud, Cardiganshire with the loss of all hands.
Venus	United Kingdom	The ship was driven ashore at King's Lynn, Norfolk.

== 2 October ==
List of shipwrecks: 2 October 1836
Ship	State	Description
Amelia	United Kingdom	The ship was driven ashore at Liverpool, Lancashire. She was on a voyage from Saint Domingo to Nassau, Bahamas and Liverpool. Amelia was refloated on 7 October and taken in to Liverpool.
Auguste	France	The ship was driven ashore near Calais. Her crew were rescued. She was on a voyage from Newcastle upon Tyne, Northumberland, United Kingdom to Rouen, Seine-Inférieure. Auguste was refloated on 6 October and taken in to Calais.
Diligence	United Kingdom	The ship was driven ashore at Aberystwyth, Cardiganshire.
Herd or Hudscott	United Kingdom	The ship ran aground on the Southcot Rocks, off the coast of Devon and capsized.
Superior	United Kingdom	The ship was abandoned in the Atlantic Ocean. Nine people were rescued by Harmony (United Kingdom).

== 3 October ==
List of shipwrecks: 3 October 1836
Ship	State	Description
Ardwell	United Kingdom	The ship was driven ashore at King's Lynn, Norfolk. She was on a voyage from Quebec City, Lower Canada, British North America to King's Lynn.
Idea	(United Kingdom of Great Britain and Ireland) British North America	The ship ran aground on the Round Reef, off Saint John, New Brunswick.
Resolute	United Kingdom	The ship was driven ashore and wrecked on Cornelmaws Sands, Glamorgan. She was on a voyage from Dublin to Barry, Glamorgan.
Sophia	Netherlands	The ship foundered. Her crew were rescued.
Union	United Kingdom	The ship capsized at Ramsgate, Kent. She was on a voyage from London to Bristol, Gloucestershire.

== 4 October ==
List of shipwrecks: 4 October 1836
Ship	State	Description
Colombia	Hamburg	The ship was lost at "Pregreas". Her crew were rescued.
Emerald	United States	The ship was wrecked on the Falsterbo Reef, in the Baltic Sea. She was on a voyage from Danzig to New York.
Idea	(United Kingdom of Great Britain and Ireland) British North America	The ship ran aground at Saint John, New Brunswick. She was on a voyage from Shubenacadie, Nova Scotia to St. John.
Mary	United Kingdom	The hoy was driven ashore on Papa Westray, Orkney Islands.
Sonne	France	The ship was driven ashore at Domesnes, Norway. she was on a voyage from Saint Petersburg, Russia to Dunkirk, Nord.

== 5 October ==
List of shipwrecks: 5 October 1836
Ship	State	Description
Lord Melville	United Kingdom	The barque was wrecked at Saint Pierre and Miquelon with the loss of four lives.
Matilda	United States	The ship was wrecked in the Bahamas. She was on a voyage from New York to Havana, Cuba.
Rebecca	United Kingdom	The ship ran aground in the Saint Charles River. She was on a voyage from Glasgow, Renfrewshire to Quebec City, Lower Canada, British North America.
Union	United Kingdom	The ship capsized at Ramsgate, Kent.
Windsor Castle	United Kingdom	The ship was driven ashore and wrecked at "Bonne Ouse", France. She was on a voyage from Newcastle upon Tyne to Bordeaux, Gironde, France.

== 6 October ==
List of shipwrecks: 6 October 1836
Ship	State	Description
Frances Harris	United Kingdom	The ship ran aground on the Domesnes Reef, in the Baltic Sea off the coast of Norway, and was abandoned.
Howden	United Kingdom	The schooner was wrecked on the Long Sand, in the North Sea off the coast of Essex with the loss of her captain. She was on a voyage from Dundee, Forfarshire to Lisbon, Portugal.
Janet Towers	United Kingdom	The ship was driven ashore and wrecked on The Rosses, County Donegal. She was on a voyage from the River Moy to the Clyde.
Mary Ford	United Kingdom	The ship was wrecked on the Pillar Rocks, in the Saint Lawrence River with the loss of two of her crew. She was on a voyage from Liverpool, Lancashire to Quebec City, Lower Canada, British North America.
Mayflower	United Kingdom	The ship was driven ashore and wrecked on "Shippigan Island", New Brunswick, British North America. Her crew were rescued. She was on a voyage from Jamaica to Quebec City.
Othello	United Kingdom	The ship was driven ashore in Princes Bay, Tobago.
Pekin	United Kingdom	The ship was driven ashore in the Saint Charles River. She was later refloated.
Rebecca	United Kingdom	The ship was driven ashore in the Saint Charles River. She was later refloated.
Sisters	United Kingdom	The sloop struck a rock and sank near Slains Castle Aberdeenshire. Her crew were rescued. She was on a voyage from Cruden Bay to Peterhead.

== 7 October ==
List of shipwrecks: 7 October 1836
Ship	State	Description
Faders Minde	Belgium	The schooner foundered in the Bristol Channel off Lundy Island, Devon, United Kingdom. Her seven crew were rescued. She was on a voyage from Newport, Monmouthshire, United Kingdom to Antwerp.
Forth	United Kingdom	The ship was driven ashore nearFrederikshavn, Denmark. She was on a voyage from Saint Petersburg, Russia to London.
Friend's Goodwill	United Kingdom	The ship sprang a leak and foundered off Carmarthen. She was on a voyage from Llanelly, Glamorgan to Carmarthen.

== 8 October ==
List of shipwrecks: 8 October 1836
Ship	State	Description
Express	United Kingdom	The smack was driven ashore and wrecked near Milford Haven, Pembrokeshire. She was on a voyage from Newport, Monmouthshire to Bridport, Dorset.
Janet	United Kingdom	The ship was driven ashore at Ross Point, County Mayo. She was on a voyage from Ballina, County Mayo to Glasgow, Renfrewshire.
Peggy	United Kingdom	The ship was wrecked on the Langhorne Sands. Her crew were rescued. She was on a voyage from Llanelly, Glamorgan to Carmarthen.
Pierre Corneille	France	The ship collided with another vessel and sank. She was on a voyage from Havre de Grâce, Seine-Inférieure to Cayenne.

== 9 October ==
List of shipwrecks: 9 October 1836
Ship	State	Description
Newcastle	United Kingdom	The ship was wrecked near "Patchaque". She was on a voyage from Burton to New York, United States.
Washington	United Kingdom	The ship was driven ashore at Thisted, Denmark. Her crew were rescued. She was on a voyage from Gävle, Sweden to London.

== 10 October ==
List of shipwrecks: 10 October 1836
Ship	State	Description
James and Mary	United Kingdom	The schooner was driven ashore and damaged on the Bondicar Rocks, Northumberland. She was on a voyage from Sunderland, County Durham to Peterhead, Aberdeenshire.
Rising Sun	United Kingdom	The ship was driven ashore at Point Oval. She was on a voyage from Quebec City, Lower Canada, British North America to Hull, Yorkshire. Rising Sun was consequently condemned.

== 11 October ==
List of shipwrecks: 11 October 1836
Ship	State	Description
Albion	United Kingdom	The ship was driven ashore on Dove Point, Lancashire. She was on a voyage from Saint John, New Brunswick, British North America to Liverpool, Lancashire.
Charlotte and Eliza	United Kingdom	The ship was driven ashore and wrecked at Wrangle, Lincolnshire. Her crew were rescued. She was on a voyage from Spalding, Lincolnshire to Leeds, Yorkshire.
Clarendon	United Kingdom	The West Indiaman was driven ashore and wrecked in Chale Bay with the loss of 25 of her 28 passengers and crew. She was on a voyage from Saint Kitts to London.
Dalkarlen	Norway	The ship capsized in a squall off the Dogger Bank with the loss of one of her eight crew. Survivors were rescued by St. Nicholas (United Kingdom). Dalkarlen was on a voyage from Riga, Russia to Havre de Grâce, Seine-Inférieure, France.
Duke of Marlborough	United Kingdom	The ship was driven ashore and wrecked near Torquay, Devon with the loss of all but one of her crew.
Farmer's Adventure	United Kingdom	The ship was driven ashore at Great Yarmouth, Norfolk. She was on a voyage from Southwold, Suffolk to South Shields, County Durham.
Isis	United Kingdom	The ship was driven ashore at Great Yarmouth. She was on a voyage from Exeter, Devon to South Shields. Isis was refloated on 10 November and taken in to Great Yarmouth.
James and Mary	United Kingdom	The ship was driven ashore near Warkworth, Northumberland.
John Barwise	United Kingdom	The ship was driven ashore at Burnham on Sea, Somerset.
Marie	Norway	The schooner was driven ashore and wrecked at Chideock, Dorset, United Kingdom with the loss of three of her five crew. She was on a voyage from Porto, Portugal to Trondheim.
Prima	United Kingdom	The ship was driven ashore near Kilnsea, Yorkshire. She was on a voyage from Sunderland, County Durham to Southampton, Hampshire.Prima was refloated on 22 October and taken in to Hull, Yorkshire.
True Friends	United Kingdom	The ship was driven ashore on the Sunk Sand, in the River Humber. She was on a voyage from Sunderland to King's Lynn, Norfolk. True Friends was later refloated and taken in to Grimsby, Lincolnshire.
Wilhelmina	Danzig	The ship was lost near Stolpmünde. She was on a voyage from Danzig to Hull, Yorkshire, United Kingdom.

== 12 October ==
List of shipwrecks: 12 October 1836
Ship	State	Description
Abbot	United Kingdom	The ship was driven ashore west of Tenby, Pembrokeshire. Her crew were rescued. She was on a voyage from Newport, Monmouthshire to Cork. Abbot was refloated on 15 October.
Amelia	Norway	The ship capsized at Truro, Cornwall, United Kingdom.
Bienfaisant	France	The ship was driven ashore at Ramsgate, Kent, United Kingdom. She was on a voyage from Honfleur, Calvados to Ramsgate. Bienfaisant was refloated on 15 October and taken in to Ramsgate.
Black Dwarf	United Kingdom	The schooner was wrecked at the mouth of the Humber with the loss of all hands. She was on a voyage from Málaga, Spain to Hull, Yorkshire.
Blessing	United Kingdom	The ship was driven ashore on Arnet Island, Newfoundland, British North America. She was on a voyage from Liverpool, Lancashire to Pugwash, Nova Scotia, British North America. Blessing was refloated on 20 October and put into Pictou, Nova Scotia for repairs.
Echo	United Kingdom	The ship was driven ashore and severely damaged at Milford Haven, Pembrokeshire.
Esperance	United Kingdom	The ship was wrecked on Prince Edward Island, British North America. She was on a voyage from Sunderland, County Durham to Miramichi, New Brunswick, British North America.
Friend's Adventure	United Kingdom	The schooner was driven ashore and wrecked at Tweedmouth, Northumberland. Her crew were rescued.
La Jeune Sophie	France	The ship was driven ashore at Guernsey, Channel Islands. Her crew were rescued. She was on a voyage from Havre de Grâce, Seine-Inférieure to Saint-Malo, Ille-et-Vilaine.
Mary Anne	(United Kingdom of Great Britain and Ireland) Jersey	The cutter was wrecked on the Hermit's Rock, Jersey. All on board were rescued. She was on a voyage from Jersey to Granville, Manche, France.
Minerva	United Kingdom	The ship was wrecked on the Hooper Sands, in Carmarthen Bay with the loss of all four crew. She was on a voyage from Caldy Island, Pembrokeshire to Bideford, Devon.
Robert	United Kingdom	The ship was driven ashore in the Bay of San José.
Success	United Kingdom	The schooner capsized off The Mumbles, Glamorgan with the loss of three of her crew.
Thomas and Isabella	United Kingdom	The sloop was wrecked on the Plough Rock, in the North Sea off the coast of Northumberland. Her crew survived. She was on a voyage from Newcastle upon Tyne, Northumberland to Eden Water.
Unity	United Kingdom	The ship sank at Ballina, County Mayo.
William and Elizabeth	United Kingdom	The ship was driven ashore and wrecked at Burnham Overy Staithe, Norfolk. She was on a voyage from Boston, Lincolnshire to London.
Wellington	United Kingdom	The ship was driven into Aquila (United Kingdom) and severely damaged off Penarth, Glamorgan.
Wheatsheaf	United Kingdom	The ship was driven ashore and wrecked at Saundersfoot, Pembrokeshire. Her crew were rescued.

== 13 October ==
List of shipwrecks: 13 October 1836
Ship	State	Description
Abel	United Kingdom	The ship was driven ashore at Tenby, Pembrokeshire.
Adelina	United Kingdom	The ship foundered in Robin Hoods Bay. Her crew were rescued.
Ann	United Kingdom	The ship was wrecked at Tyninghame, Lothian. Her crew were rescued.
Eldon	United Kingdom	The ship was wrecked near Louisbourg, Nova Scotia, British North America with the loss of two of her crew.
Garland	United Kingdom	The ship was wrecked on Scroby Sands, Norfolk. Her crew were rescued.
Helen	United Kingdom	The schooner was driven ashore and wrecked at Peterhead, Aberdeenshire. Her crew were rescued by rocket apparatus.
James	United Kingdom	The ship departed from Falmouth, Cornwall for Liverpool, Lancashire. No further trace, presumed foundered with the loss of all hands.
Louisa	United Kingdom	The barque was abandoned in the Atlantic Ocean (44°53′N 38°30′W). Her crew were rescued by Mary (United Kingdom). Louisa was sighted on 30 November by the brig Emilie (France).
Minerva	United Kingdom	The schooner was wrecked in the Isles of Scilly with the loss of all but one of those on board. She was on a voyage from Gibraltar to Bristol, Gloucestershire.
Triad	United Kingdom	The brig was abandoned in the North Sea off Flamborough Head, Yorkshire. She was taken in to Bridlington, Yorkshire on 15 October.
Wheatsheaf	United Kingdom	The ship was wrecked in Lundyfoot Bay. Her crew were rescued.
William	United Kingdom	The ship was abandoned in the Atlantic Ocean. She was on a voyage from Quebec City, Lower Canada, British North America to Padstow, Cornwall.
William and Ann	United Kingdom	The ship was driven ashore 6 nautical miles (11 km) west of Lyme, Dorset with the loss of a crew member. She was on a voyage from Limerick to London.

== 14 October ==
List of shipwrecks: 14 October 1836
Ship	State	Description
Briton	United Kingdom	The ship was driven ashore in the Humber. She was on a voyage from Hull to Goole, Yorkshire.
Catherina Maria	Prussia	The ship foundered off Skagen, Denmark. Her crew were rescued. She was on a voyage from Hull to Stralsund.
Europe	United Kingdom	The ship was driven ashore on the west coast of Gotland, Sweden. She was on a voyage from Narva, Russia to Dundee, Forfarshire. Europe was refloated on 17 October and resumed her voyage.
Neptunus	Danzig	The ship was wrecked on the Jadder Bank, in the North Sea. She was on a voyage from Hull to Danzig.
Resolution	United Kingdom	The ship was run down and sunk in the North Sea off Flamborough Head, Yorkshire by Theodocia (United Kingdom).Resolution was on a voyage from South Shields, County Durham to Exeter, Devon.
Sarah	United Kingdom	The ship was wrecked near Cascumpeque Harbour, Prince Edward Island, British North America. She was on a voyage from Newcastle upon Tyne, Northumberland to Cocagne, New Brunswick, British North America.
Union	United Kingdom	The ship was driven ashore near King's Lynn, Norfolk. Her crew were rescued. She was on a voyage from Wolferton, Norfolk to Wisbech, Cambridgeshire.
William and Ann	United Kingdom	The ship was driven ashore and wrecked at Seaton, County Durham with the loss of a crew member and a rescuer. She was on a voyage from Limerick to London.

== 15 October ==
List of shipwrecks: 15 October 1836
Ship	State	Description
Marianne	France	The ship was wrecked at Jersey, Channel Islands. She was on a voyage from Jersey to Granville, Manche.
Rochester	United Kingdom	The ship was driven ashore and damaged at St. Andrews, Fife. She was later refloated and put under repair.

== 16 October ==
List of shipwrecks: 16 October 1836
Ship	State	Description
Buenos Ayres	United Kingdom	The ship ran aground at Whitby, Yorkshire and was damaged. She was on a voyage from Seaham, County Durham to London. Buenos Ayres was later refloated and taken in to Whitby.
Hopewell	United Kingdom	The ship was driven ashore on Saaremaa, Russia. Her crew were rescued. She was on a voyage from London to Saint Petersburg, Russia.
Jane	United Kingdom	The ship sprang a leak and sank in Jack Sound, off the coast of Pembrokeshire.

== 17 October ==
List of shipwrecks: 17 October 1836
Ship	State	Description
City of Londonderry	United Kingdom	The steamship was driven ashore at Dover, Kent. All on board were rescued. She was on a voyage from Dublin to London. City of Londonderry was later refloated.
Only Son	United States	The ship was driven ashore at Hempstead Beach, New York. She was on a voyage from Jamaica to New York City.
Red Rover	United Kingdom	The paddle steamer collided with the steamship Magnet (United Kingdom) off the north Kent coast and foundered. All on board were rescued by Magnet. Red Rover was on a voyage from London to Herne Bay, Kent.
Thomas and Anna	United Kingdom	The ship was run down and sunk off St Agnes, Cornwall by Rebecca (United Kingdom). Her crew were rescued. Thomas and Anna was on a voyage from Newport, Monmouthshire to Exeter, Devon.

== 18 October ==
List of shipwrecks: 18 October 1836
Ship	State	Description
Amelia	United Kingdom	The ship departed from Calcutta, India. No further trace, presumed foundered with the loss of all hands.
Adventurer	United Kingdom	The ship was driven ashore at "Mille Vache", Lower Canada, British North America. She was on a voyage from Liverpool, Lancashire to Montreal, Lower Canada. Adventurer was later refloated and taken in to "Kamarouska".
Conceiqaio e Almas	Portugal	The ship was wrecked at Madeira.
Erin	United Kingdom	The ship was wrecked near Bray, County Wicklow. Her crew were rescued. She was on a voyage from Wicklow to Liverpool, Lancashire.
Eugene	United Kingdom	The ship was driven ashore at Noordwijk, North Holland, Netherlands. She was on a voyage from Honfleur, Calvados, France to Newcastle upon Tyne, Northumberland.
Maria Adelaide	Portugal	The ship was wrecked at Madeira.
Sophia	United Kingdom	The ship was driven ashore at "Mille Vache". She was later refloated and taken in to Quebec City, Lower Canada, where she arrived on 15 November.

== 19 October ==
List of shipwrecks: 19 October 1836
Ship	State	Description
Alert	United Kingdom	The ship was wrecked at Larache, Morocco. Her crew were rescued. She was on a voyage from Gibraltar to Larache.
Amice Rose	France	The ship struck rocks and sank at Alderney, Channel Islands. Her crew were rescued. She was on a voyage from Rouen, Seine-Inférieure to Brest, Finistère.
Dowson	United Kingdom	The barque was abandoned in the Atlantic Ocean. Her seventeen crew were rescued by Lipton (United Kingdom). Dowson was on a voyage from Whitby, Yorkshire to Saint John, New Brunswick, British North America.
Esther	United Kingdom	The ship ran aground in Lake Saint Pierre. She was on a voyage from Liverpool, Lancashire to Montreal, Lower Canada, British North America.

== 20 October ==
List of shipwrecks: 20 October 1836
Ship	State	Description
Camille	France	The ship was wrecked in Simons Bay. Her crew were rescued. She was on a voyage from Île Bourbon to Marseille, Bouches-du-Rhône.
Elizabeth	Spain	The ship was driven ashore on the Cortadura Beach, Cádiz. She was on a voyage from Newfoundland, British North America to Alicante. Elizabeth was refloated on 23 October and beached.
Erne	United Kingdom	The sloop was driven ashore at Bray, County Wicklow. Her five crew were rescued.
Friendship	United Kingdom	The ship was driven ashore at Bideford, Devon. She was refloated on 30 October and taken in to Bideford.
Jona	United Kingdom	The brig was wrecked on a reef off Saint-Esprit, Lower Canada, British North America. She was on a voyage from London to Quebec City, Lower Canada.
Marys	United Kingdom	The ship collided with Maria Brandt (Russia) and foundered in the North Sea 60 nautical miles (110 km) off the mouth of the Humber. Her crew were rescued by Aurora (United Kingdom). She was on a voyage from Hull, Yorkshire to Saint Petersburg, Russia.

== 21 October ==
List of shipwrecks: 21 October 1836
Ship	State	Description
Adams	United States	The ship foundered off Point Eto. Her crew were rescued. She was on a voyage from Jamaica to New York.
Betsey	Sweden	The ship was driven ashore and wrecked on Ameland, Friesland, Netherlands. She was on a voyage from Stockholm, Sweden to London, United Kingdom.
Fairfield	United Kingdom	The ship capsized at Liverpool, Lancashire. She was later righted.
Mulgrave	United Kingdom	The ship was wrecked on the coast of Newfoundland, British North America. She was on a voyage from an Irish port to Quebec City, Lower Canada, British North America.
Trace Greble	Denmark	The ship was driven ashore and wrecked near Thisted. Her crew were rescued. She was on a voyage from Amsterdam, North Holland, Netherlands to Aalborg.

== 22 October ==
List of shipwrecks: 22 October 1836
Ship	State	Description
Adolf Frederick	(Russian Empire) Grand Duchy of Finland	The ship was driven ashore at Visby, Sweden. She was on a voyage from Newcastle upon Tyne, Northumberland to Pori.
Louisa	(United Kingdom of Great Britain and Ireland) New South Wales	The sloop was wrecked in the D'Entrecasteaux Channel at the mouth of the Derwent River, Van Diemen's Land with the loss of two of her crew.

== 23 October ==
List of shipwrecks: 23 October 1836
Ship	State	Description
Ann	United Kingdom	The ship was driven ashore and wrecked at Kronstadt, Russia. She was on a voyage from Liverpool, Lancashire to Saint Petersburg, Russia.
Cinco de Abril	Chile	The brig was driven ashore and wrecked at Valparaíso with the loss of all but one of her crew.
Fayalence	Portugal	The ship was driven ashore and wrecked on Faial Island, Azores.
Felix Intelligente	Chile	The brigantine was driven ashore and severely damaged at Valparaíso.
Friends Adventure	United Kingdom	The ship was driven ashore at the mouth of the River Tweed. She was on a voyage from Glasgow, Renfrewshire to Newcastle upon Tyne, Northumberland.
Independencia	Chile	The brig was driven ashore at Valparaíso. She was refloated on 26 October.
John Echlin	United Kingdom	The schooner was driven ashore and wrecked at Valparaíso.
Rosa	Chile	The schooner was driven ashore and severely damaged at Valparaíso.
Serena	Chile	The barque was driven ashore and wrecked at Valparaíso.
Sir John Kean	United Kingdom	The brig was driven ashore and severely damaged at Valparaíso.
Waterlily	United Kingdom	The ship was destroyed by fire at the mouth of the River Shannon with the loss of all but one of her crew.
William Byrne	United States	The ship was driven ashore at Valparaíso. All on board were rescued.

== 24 October ==
List of shipwrecks: 24 October 1836
Ship	State	Description
De Vrow Alida	Netherlands	The ship was in collision with another vessel in the English Channel off Bolt Head, Devon, United Kingdom and was abandoned. She was on a voyage from Cardiff, Glamorgan, United Kingdom to Amsterdam, South Holland.
San Bernardo	Portugal	The ship was wrecked at Terceira Island, Azores.

== 25 October ==
List of shipwrecks: 25 October 1836
Ship	State	Description
Emerald	United Kingdom	The ship was wrecked in the Saint Lawrence River with the loss of six lives.
James Lumsden	United Kingdom	The schooner departed from Sunderland, County Durham for Aberdeen. No further trace, presumed foundered with the loss of all hands.
Mary	United Kingdom	The ship was driven ashore near Liverpool, Lancashire.
Royal Tar	United States	Royal Tar. Carrying passengers and circus animals, the 160-foot (49 m), 400-gross register ton sidewheel paddle steamer caught fire in Penobscot Bay off the coast of Maine east of Vinalhaven Island. She drifted away and sank with the loss of 32 of the 91 people on board.

== 26 October ==
List of shipwrecks: 26 October 1836
Ship	State	Description
British Merchant	United Kingdom	The ship was driven ashore at Rimouski, Lower Canada, British North America. She was subsequently destroyed by fire.
John and Margaret	United Kingdom	The ship was driven ashore in Narva Bay. Her crew were rescued.
Prince George	United Kingdom	The ship was driven ashore at Rimouski. She was refloated some months later and taken in to Patrick's Hole.

== 27 October ==
List of shipwrecks: 27 October 1836
Ship	State	Description
Catherine	United Kingdom	The ship struck the Stag Rocks and foundered. She was refloated on 7 November and taken in to Falmouth, Cornwall.
Charlotte	United States	The brig was driven ashore on Gotland, Sweden. She was later refloated and taken in to "Stite" for repairs.
Clara Margaretta	Netherlands	The ship was driven ashore and wrecked at Callantsoog, Groningen with the loss of all hands, although a pilot was rescued. She was on a voyage from Sunderland, County Durham, United Kingdom to Amsterdam, North Holland.
Gode Hensigt	Hamburg	The ship was driven ashore at Mandal, Norway. She was on a voyage from Havre de Grâce, Seine-Inférieure, France to Hamburg.
Jane	United Kingdom	The ship was driven ashore at Fishguard, Pembrokeshire.
John	United Kingdom	The ship was wrecked on the Herd Sand, in the North Sea off the coast of County Durham. Her crew were rescued.
Lucy End	United Kingdom	The ship was driven ashore at Larne, County Antrim.
Sarah Maria	United Kingdom	The ship was wrecked on the Herd Sand.
Swift	United Kingdom	The ship departed from Newry, County Antrim for Liverpool, Lancashire. No further trace, presumed foundered with the loss of all hands.

== 28 October ==
List of shipwrecks: 28 October 1836
Ship	State	Description
Antonia Madelaine	Spain	The brig was lost on the Hind Bank, in the North Sea. Her ten crew were rescued. She was on a voyage from Bergen, Norway to Bilbao.
Convoy	United States	The ship departed from Honolulu, Sandwich Islands for the north west coast of America. No further trace, presumed foundered in the Pacific Ocean with the loss of all hands.
Eugene	France	The schooner was driven ashore at Noordwijk, North Holland, Netherlands. Her seventeen crew were rescued by lifeboat. She was on a voyage from Honfleur, Calvados to Newcastle upon Tyne, Northumberland, United Kingdom.
Falcon	(United Kingdom of Great Britain and Ireland) Isle of Man	The ship was driven ashore and wrecked at Whitehaven, Cumberland. Her crew were rescued. She was on a voyage from Peel to Whitehaven.
Friendship	United Kingdom	The ship was wrecked at Conway, Caernarfonshire. She was on a voyage from Saint Domingo to Cork and Liverpool, Lancashire.
Henry and Jane	United Kingdom	The ship capsized in Abergele Bay with the loss of three of her six crew. The next day, she was driven ashore and wrecked near Rhyl, Denbighshire. She was on a voyage from Ipswich, Suffolk to Liverpool, Lancashire.
Hoffnung	Hamburg	The ship was driven ashore near Pärnu, Russia.
Intrepido	Spain	The ship was driven ashore on Borkum, Kingdom of Hanover. She was on a voyage from Bergen, Norway to Bilbao.
Jean Baptiste	France	The ship sprang a leak and foundered off Cape Lailly. Four crew were rescued. She was on a voyage from Sunderland, County Durham, United Kingdom to Havre de Grâce, Seine-Inférieure.
Mary	United Kingdom	The ship was driven ashore at Red Wharf Bay, Anglesey.
Plywell	United Kingdom	The sloop was driven ashore and wrecked between Harrington and Parton, Cumberland with the loss of all hands, at least three people. She was on a voyage from Dumfries to Whitehaven.
Progress	United Kingdom	The ship was driven ashore near Bude, Cornwall. Her crew were rescued. She was refloated on 1 November.
Volunteer	(United Kingdom of Great Britain and Ireland) Isle of Man	The ship was wrecked at St. Bees Head, Cumberland with the loss of all hands, at least four lives. She was on a voyage from Whitehaven to Port St. Mary

== 29 October ==
List of shipwrecks: 29 October 1836
Ship	State	Description
Avelines	United Kingdom	The ship was driven ashore near "Fibel".
Catherine	United Kingdom	The ship was driven ashore near "Fibel".
Ellen	United Kingdom	The ship was driven ashore near Red Wharf Bay, Anglesey.
Entreprenant	France	The ship was driven ashore near Saint-Martin-de-Ré, Charente-Maritime. She was on a voyage from Newfoundland to Bordeaux, Gironde. Entreprenant was refloated in early November and taken in to "La Howe".
Eolus	United Kingdom	The ship was driven ashore at "Comet Castle", Guernsey, Channel Islands. She was on a voyage from Lisbon, Portugal to Guernsey. Eolus was later refloated.
Espérance	France	The ship was driven ashore and wrecked at Dieppe, Seine-Inférieure with the loss of all hands. She was on a voyage from Caen, Calvados to Dieppe.
Friends	United Kingdom	The ship was driven ashore and wrecked at Conwy, Caernarfonshire. Eight of her crew were rescued.
Jessey	United States	The ship ran aground on the Wharf Bank, off the coast of Anglesy.
John Cullen	United Kingdom	The ship was lost near Libava, Courland Governorate. Her crew were rescued. She was on a voyage from Ventava, Courland Governorate to Leith, Lothian.
Louisa	United Kingdom	The ship was driven ashore on Lindisfarne, Northumberland. She was on a voyage from Wick, Caithness to London. Louisa was refloated on 12 November.
Neptune	United Kingdom	The ship was driven ashore near Bridport, Dorset. She was on a voyage from Weymouth, Dorset to Plymouth, Devon.
Providence	United Kingdom	The galiot foundered off the Cornish coast between Boscastle and Bude with the loss of all hands. She was on a voyage from Wexford to Bristol, Gloucestershire.
Tom Thumb	United States	The paddle steamer was driven ashore and wrecked at Boon Island, Maine.
Venus	United Kingdom	The ship was driven ashore near Bridlington, Yorkshire. She was on a voyage from Boston, Lincolnshire to Aberdeen. Venus was refloated on 5 November and taken in to Bridlington.
Victory	United Kingdom	The ship was in collision with William (United Kingdom) in the Bristol Channel off the coast of Pembrokeshire and was abandoned. She was on driven ashore and wrecked at Pentreath, Cornwall on 2 November.

== 30 October ==
List of shipwrecks: 30 October 1836
Ship	State	Description
Bien Venue	Belgium	The ship was driven ashore at Danzig. Her crew were rescued. She was on a voyage from Danzig to Ostend, West Flanders.
Caledonia	United Kingdom	The ship was wrecked near Fécamp, Seine-Inférieure, France. Her crew were rescued.
Celerity	United Kingdom	The ship was driven ashore and wrecked on Hogland, Russia with the loss of ten of her twelve crew. She was on a voyage from Saint Petersburg, Russia to London.
Elizabeth and Mary Dod	United Kingdom	The ship was driven ashore on Hogland. Her crew were rescued. She was on a voyage from Dundee, Forfarshire to Saint Petersburg.
Estratningen	Hamburg	The ship was driven ashore on "Schaarboor". She was on a voyage from Marseille, Bouches-du-Rhône, France to Hamburg. Estratningen was later refloated and taken in to Cuxhaven.
Fame	United Kingdom	The ship capsized and sank in the English Channel 12 leagues (36 nautical miles (67 km)) south east of Start Point, Devon. Her crew were rescued by Mynx (United Kingdom). She was on a voyage from London to São Miguel Island, Azores.
Futtap	Flag unknown	The Arabian ship foundered whilst on a voyage from Bombay to Calcutta, India with the loss of most of her crew. A few survivors were rescued by Hawke (United Kingdom).
Highlander	United Kingdom	The ship was driven ashore on Saaremaa, Russia. She was refloated on 1 November.
Molo	United Kingdom	The ship was wrecked on the north end of Gotland, Sweden. Her crew were rescued. She was on a voyage from Saint Petersburg to Boston, Lincolnshire.
Star	United States	The ship was wrecked at Madras, India.
Wesley	United Kingdom	The lugger was capsized in a squall off Smith's Knoll, in the North Sea with the loss of all ten crew.

== 31 October ==
List of shipwrecks: 31 October 1836
Ship	State	Description
Atalanta	United Kingdom	The steamship ran aground at Grange Chine, Isle of Wight. She was on a voyage from Guernsey, Channel Islands to Southampton, Hampshire. Atalanta was later refloated.
Experiment	United Kingdom	The brig foundered off the Isles of Scilly with the loss of six of her crew.
Leopold II	Grand Duchy of Tuscany	The ship was wrecked at Marseille, Bouches-du-Rhône, France.
Lykkens Prove	Denmark	The ship was driven ashore near Skagen. Her crew were rescued. She was on a voyage from Copenhagen to Randers.
Mary Ann	United Kingdom	The ship capsized and sank off Heligholmen, Sweden. She was on a voyage from Saint Petersburg, Russia to Gloucester.
Montebello	French Navy	The Océan-class ship of the line was driven ashore at the Grosse Tour, Toulon, Var.
Prince Regent	United Kingdom	The ship was driven ashore at "Wettsa", Russia and was abandoned by her crew. She was on a voyage from Riga, Russia to London.
Rose	United Kingdom	The ship sprang a leak and foundered off Loch Eriboll. Her crew were rescued. She was on a voyage from Wells-next-the-Sea, Norfolk to Newry, County Antrim.
Vigilant	Portugal	The ship was driven ashore at Pillau, Prussia. She was on a voyage from St. Ubes to Pillau.Vigilant was refloated on 7 November.

== Unknown date ==
List of shipwrecks: Unknown date in October 1836
Ship	State	Description
Adventure	United Kingdom	The ship was driven ashore at "Mille Vaches". She was on a voyage from Liverpool, Lancashire to Quebec City, Lower Canada, British North America.
Brunswick	United Kingdom	The ship was wrecked on Saaremaa, Russia. She was on a voyage from London to Saint Petersburg, Russia.
Clara Maria	Netherlands	The ship was driven ashore on Texel, North Holland. She was on a voyage from Newcastle upon Tyne, Northumberland, United Kingdom to Amsterdam, North Holland.
Corsair	United Kingdom	The ship ran aground in the Dardanelles.
Dawson	United Kingdom	The barque was abandoned in the Atlantic Ocean before 20 October. She was subsequently driven ashore and wrecked at Point May, Newfoundland, British North America.
Ellergill	United Kingdom	The ship was driven ashore on Gotland.
Esperance	France	The ship was driven ashore at La Tranche-sur-Mer, Vendée. She was refloated but subsequently drove ashore at "Annis".
Goede Hendricht	Norway	The ship was lost near Mandal. Her crew were rescued. She was on a voyage from London, United Kingdom to Arendal.
Gregory Bogastaff	Russia	The ship was driven ashore on Læsø, Denmark. She was on a voyage from Saint Petersburg to Hull, Yorkshire, United Kingdom. Gregory Bogastaff was later refloated and taken in to Helsingør, where she arrived on 5 November.
Halcyon	United States	The ship was wrecked on the coast of Mexico.
H and M	United Kingdom	The brig was driven ashore at Dragør, Denmark. She was on a voyage from Riga, Russia to London. H and M was later refloated and put into Copenhagen, Denmark for repairs.
Isabella	(United Kingdom of Great Britain and Ireland) New South Wales	The ship was wrecked in the Torres Straits. She was on a voyage from Sydney to the Swan River.
Jeune Clarisse	France	The ship was wrecked on Goree, Zeeland, Netherlands.
John Dunlop	United Kingdom	The ship foundered off the Isles of Scilly before 18 October.
Marie Elizabeth	Hamburg	The ship was wrecked off "Gerup" before 17 October. She was on a voyage from Banff, Aberdeenshire to the Hamburg.
Mary	United Kingdom	The ship foundered in the Irish Sea. She was on a voyage from Llanelly, Glamorgan to Waterford.
Mary	United Kingdom	The schooner was driven ashore on Anholt. She was refloated after 13 days and taken in to Helsingør, Denmark for repairs.
Neptunus	Norway	The brig was driven ashore at Thisted, Denmark before 29 October. She was on a voyage from Dram to Amsterdam, North Holland, Netherlands.
Redmond	United Kingdom	The ship was abandoned in the Irish Sea. She was on a voyage from Youghal, County Cork to Bristol, Gloucestershire. Redmond was later towed in to Penarth, Glamorgan by the steamship Star (United Kingdom).
Sally	United Kingdom	The ship was driven ashore at "Scheffling".
Scotia	(United Kingdom of Great Britain and Ireland) New South Wales	The ship was wrecked on the Actaeon Reef. Her crew were rescued.
Tomboy	United Kingdom	The schooner struck a rock off "Settra Koo", Africa and was damaged. She was later refloated and put into a port in Sierra Leone, where she arrived on 1 November.
Union	United Kingdom	The ship was abandoned in the North Sea before 14 October. She was taken in to Scarborough, Yorkshire on that date.
United States	United States	The steamship was wrecked in the Withlacoochee River, Florida Territory between 22 and 27 October.
Vier Gebroeders	Duchy of Holstein	The ship was abandoned in the North Sea. She was later taken into Stavanger, Norway, arriving on 21 October.
Waterloo	United Kingdom	The sloop sank in the River Humber off Stallingborough, Lincolnshire. Her crew were rescued. She was on a voyage from Louth, Lincolnshire to Wakefield, Yorkshire.
Williams	United Kingdom	The ship was driven ashore at Weymouth, Dorset. She was on a voyage from Cork to London. Williams was refloated on 4 October and taken in to Weymouth.
