= Byrum =

Byrum may refer to:

- Byrum (surname)
- Byrum Fred Saam, Jr., known as By Saam, sportscaster
- Byrum, Denmark, the main town of the Danish island Læsø
- "Byrum", the name given to the alien antagonists of Stephen King's novel Dreamcatcher

== See also ==
- Byrum's raukar, a group of stacks near the village of Byrum, Öland
