= Agnes Benham =

(1850–1932) Australian socialist and advocate of sex reform

- Born: Agnes Mary Matilda Nesbit; 3 December 1850; Adelaide, South Australia
- Died: 7 March 1932 (aged 81); Melbourne, Victoria, Australia
- Occupation: writer
- Known for: radical thinking including sex reform
- Children: 3

Agnes Mary Matilda Benham born Agnes Mary Matilda Nesbit (3 December 1850 – 7 March 1932) was an Australian socialist and advocate of divorce and sex reform. Her daughter Dr Rosamund Agnes Benham was also notable as an advocate for same fields.

== Life ==
Benham was born in Adelaide in 1850. Two years later, her mother, Ann (née Pariss), died following the birth of her fifth child, Paris Nesbit. Her father, Edward Planta Nesbit, was a schoolteacher and a cousin of the English writer E. Nesbit. Members of the Australian branch of the Nesbit family were also associated with radical political views. Her father was religious, taught and wrote poetry.

In 1870, she married John James Benham and they planned to move to Paraguay a few years later. However they thought again when they saw the "Royal Tar" the ship that was to take them there. The ship killed thirty passengers in 1836. In time John and Agnes had three children and Agnes wrote for the Weekly Herald. She was a speaker at the Adelaide Democratic Club.

Her brother, Paris(s), was a lawyer who was sometimes held in asylums. He was in Parkside Asylum in 1898 by order of the Kingston government. This was overruled by the Supreme Court. After his release he published The Beaten Side, a tract against Darwinism, and in 1900, they launched Morning (renamed Morning Star in 1902), a weekly publication that championed their causes.

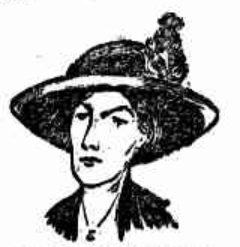
Dr Rosamund Agnes Benham in 1913

One of Agnes's causes was women's rights. She argued that women should be allowed to attend university. Her daughter Rosamund went to university and became Dr Benham. She was as equally outspoken as her mother. They both believed in sexual reform.

Agnes helped to form the "Clarion fellowship of Socialists" and she served on its first committee.

Agnes argued for the right to dissolve a loveless marriage, stating that the law created de facto "prostitution", if divorce was not permitted. In 1904, Agnes' book, Love's Way to Perfect Humanhood was published. Her daughter Rosamund's 1903 marriage was unhappy and after she parted from her husband, there was a divorce based on his cruelty. He husband rarely worked and demanded money from her threatening her with a pistol and assaulting her. She and their two children returned to Rosamund's name of Benham.

Benham died aged 81 in Queen Victoria Hospital in Melbourne in 1932. Only her son survived her.
