= Sundre, Gotland =

Sundre
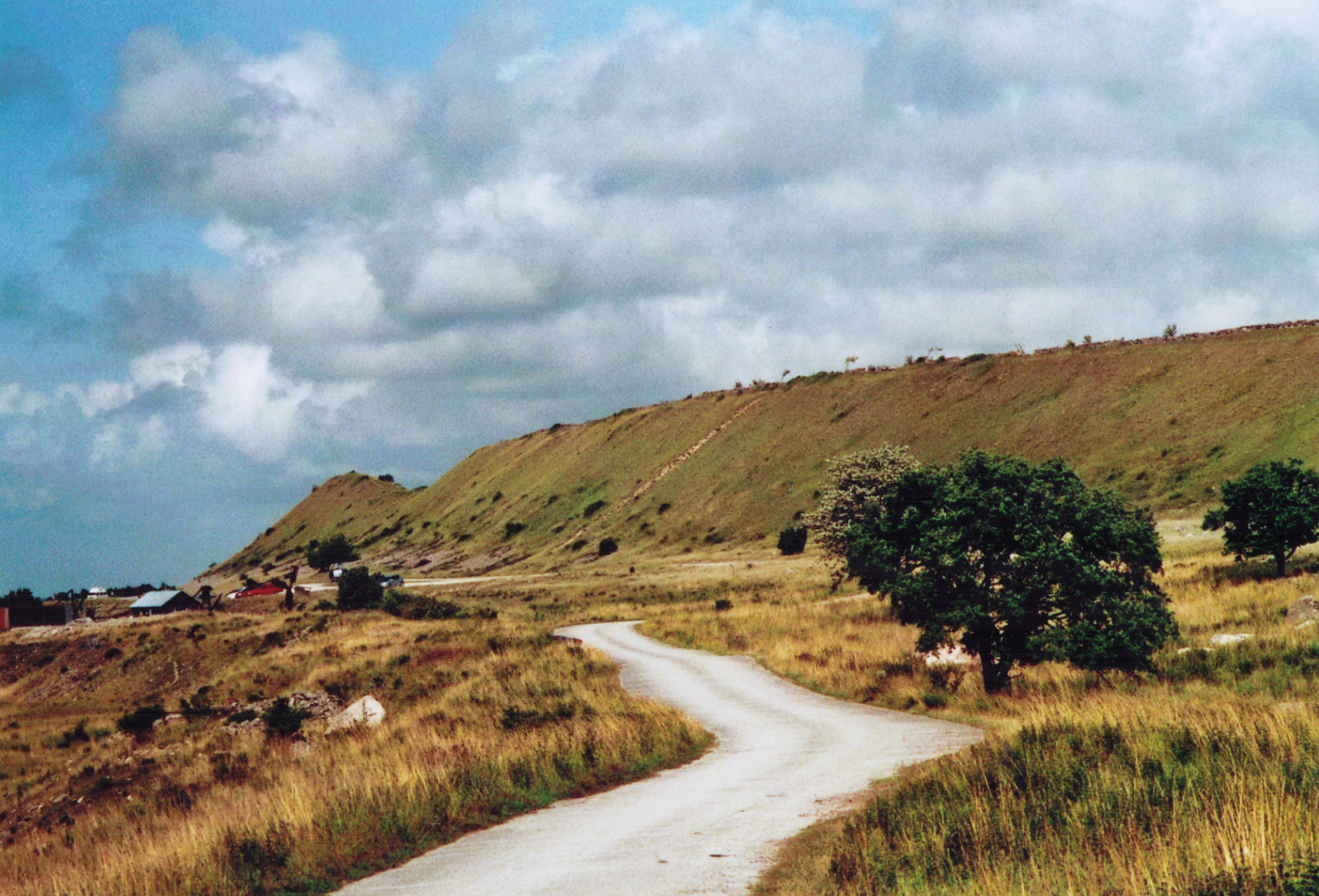
- Hoburgen in Sundre

- Location within Gotland
- Coordinates: 56°56′9″N 18°10′54″E
- Country: Sweden
- Province: Gotland
- County: Gotland County
- Municipality: Gotland Municipality

Area
  - Total: 20.71 km^{2} (8.00 sq mi)

Population (2014)
  - Total: 24
- Time zone: UTC+1 (CET)
  - Summer (DST): UTC+2 (CEST)

Sundre is a populated area, a socken (not to be confused with parish), on the Swedish island of Gotland. It comprises the same area as the administrative Sundre District, established on 1 January 2016.

== Geography ==
Sundre is the name of the socken as well as the district. It is also the name of the small village surrounding the medieval Sundre Church, sometimes referred to as Sundre kyrkby. It is the southernmost socken on the island, situated on the south tip of Gotland on the Storsudret peninsula. On the south coast of Sundre is the Hoburg lighthouse as well as the rauk (sea stack) area known as Hoburgen. One of the rauks is the noted Hoburgsgubben ("Old Man Hoburg").

South of Hoburgen is the Hoburg Shoal bird reserve.

As of 2019, Sundre Church belongs to Hoburg parish in Sudrets pastorat, along with the churches in Öja, Hamra, Vamlingbo and Fide.

One of the asteroids in the asteroid belt, 9374 Sundre, is named after this place.
