= Fide =

Fide may refer to

- Fide, Gotland, a populated place in Sweden
- FIDE, also known as the International Chess Federation or World Chess Federation
- Bona fide, good faith
