= Hoburgen =

Swedish landform

Coordinates: 56°55′11″N 18°07′29″E

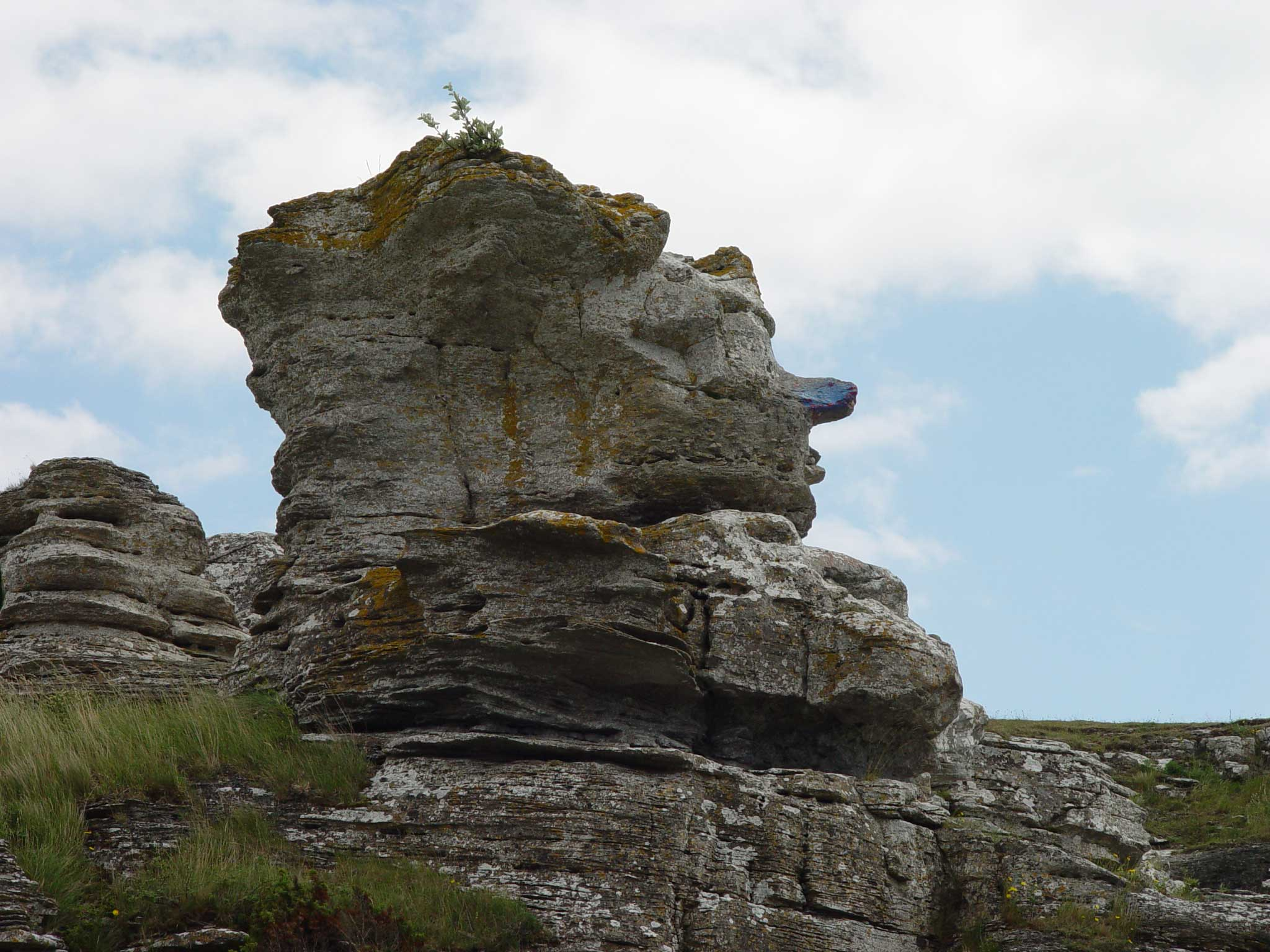
Hoburgsgubben ("Old Man Hoburg") a noted sea stack formation in the southernmost part of Hoburgen, Gotland.

Hoburgen is a rauk (sea stack) area on the Storsudret peninsula in Sundre socken on the southern tip of Gotland, Sweden.

The area contains one of Gotland's most noted rauks, the Hoburgsgubben ("Old Man Hoburg"). One of the asteroids in the asteroid belt, 10104 Hoburgsgubben, is named after it. South of Hoburgen is the Hoburg Shoal bird reserve.

Hoburgen is also one of the permanent weather stations along the Swedish coast. It is reported from daily in the Swedish Shipping Forecast.

== Climate ==
Hoburgen has a maritime climate with less differences between summer and winter than mainland Sweden. Its position on the edge of the peninsula that makes up the southern tip of the island, ensures that wind mainly travels over the Baltic Sea, tempering the warm summers of around 20 °C (68 °F), preventing them from turning into heat waves. The very same effect ensures that Hoburgen rarely if ever gets cold winters by typical Swedish standards. Another effect is the seasonal lag causing August to surpass July on many years in terms of being the warmest month and February typically being the coldest.

Climate data for Hoburgen (2002–2020 averages; extremes since 1901)
Month	Jan	Feb	Mar	Apr	May	Jun	Jul	Aug	Sep	Oct	Nov	Dec	Year
Record high °C (°F)	8.6 (47.5)	8.0 (46.4)	13.5 (56.3)	22.9 (73.2)	27.3 (81.1)	29.8 (85.6)	31.0 (87.8)	29.1 (84.4)	25.8 (78.4)	18.4 (65.1)	13.4 (56.1)	9.7 (49.5)	31.0 (87.8)
Mean maximum °C (°F)	5.6 (42.1)	5.1 (41.2)	9.0 (48.2)	14.6 (58.3)	21.3 (70.3)	23.3 (73.9)	26.1 (79.0)	24.8 (76.6)	20.2 (68.4)	15.3 (59.5)	10.3 (50.5)	7.2 (45.0)	26.9 (80.4)
Mean daily maximum °C (°F)	2.5 (36.5)	2.2 (36.0)	4.4 (39.9)	8.8 (47.8)	14.0 (57.2)	18.3 (64.9)	21.3 (70.3)	21.3 (70.3)	17.3 (63.1)	11.4 (52.5)	7.4 (45.3)	4.5 (40.1)	11.1 (52.0)
Daily mean °C (°F)	0.5 (32.9)	0.3 (32.5)	1.9 (35.4)	5.8 (42.4)	10.7 (51.3)	14.9 (58.8)	18.2 (64.8)	18.3 (64.9)	14.4 (57.9)	9.6 (49.3)	5.9 (42.6)	3.0 (37.4)	8.6 (47.5)
Mean daily minimum °C (°F)	−0.8 (30.6)	−1.0 (30.2)	−0.3 (31.5)	2.7 (36.9)	7.3 (45.1)	11.7 (53.1)	15.5 (59.9)	15.6 (60.1)	12.3 (54.1)	7.7 (45.9)	4.5 (40.1)	1.6 (34.9)	6.4 (43.5)
Mean minimum °C (°F)	−7.1 (19.2)	−7.1 (19.2)	−5.0 (23.0)	−1.5 (29.3)	2.2 (36.0)	7.5 (45.5)	11.7 (53.1)	11.3 (52.3)	7.6 (45.7)	1.8 (35.2)	−1.3 (29.7)	−3.3 (26.1)	−8.9 (16.0)
Record low °C (°F)	−24.1 (−11.4)	−23.5 (−10.3)	−20.1 (−4.2)	−10.4 (13.3)	−4.0 (24.8)	1.3 (34.3)	6.5 (43.7)	5.4 (41.7)	1.0 (33.8)	−3.4 (25.9)	−7.5 (18.5)	−13.7 (7.3)	−24.1 (−11.4)
Average precipitation mm (inches)	42.0 (1.65)	28.5 (1.12)	27.0 (1.06)	20.5 (0.81)	26.2 (1.03)	38.6 (1.52)	74.4 (2.93)	52.8 (2.08)	31.4 (1.24)	54.1 (2.13)	58.9 (2.32)	46.2 (1.82)	500.6 (19.71)
Mean monthly sunshine hours	38.6	68.4	164.5	247.4	318.3	323.9	303.5	270.5	198.6	115.4	51.5	36.5	2,137.1
Source 1: SMHI
Source 2: SMHI Monthly Data 2002–2018
