= Öja, Gotland =

Öja
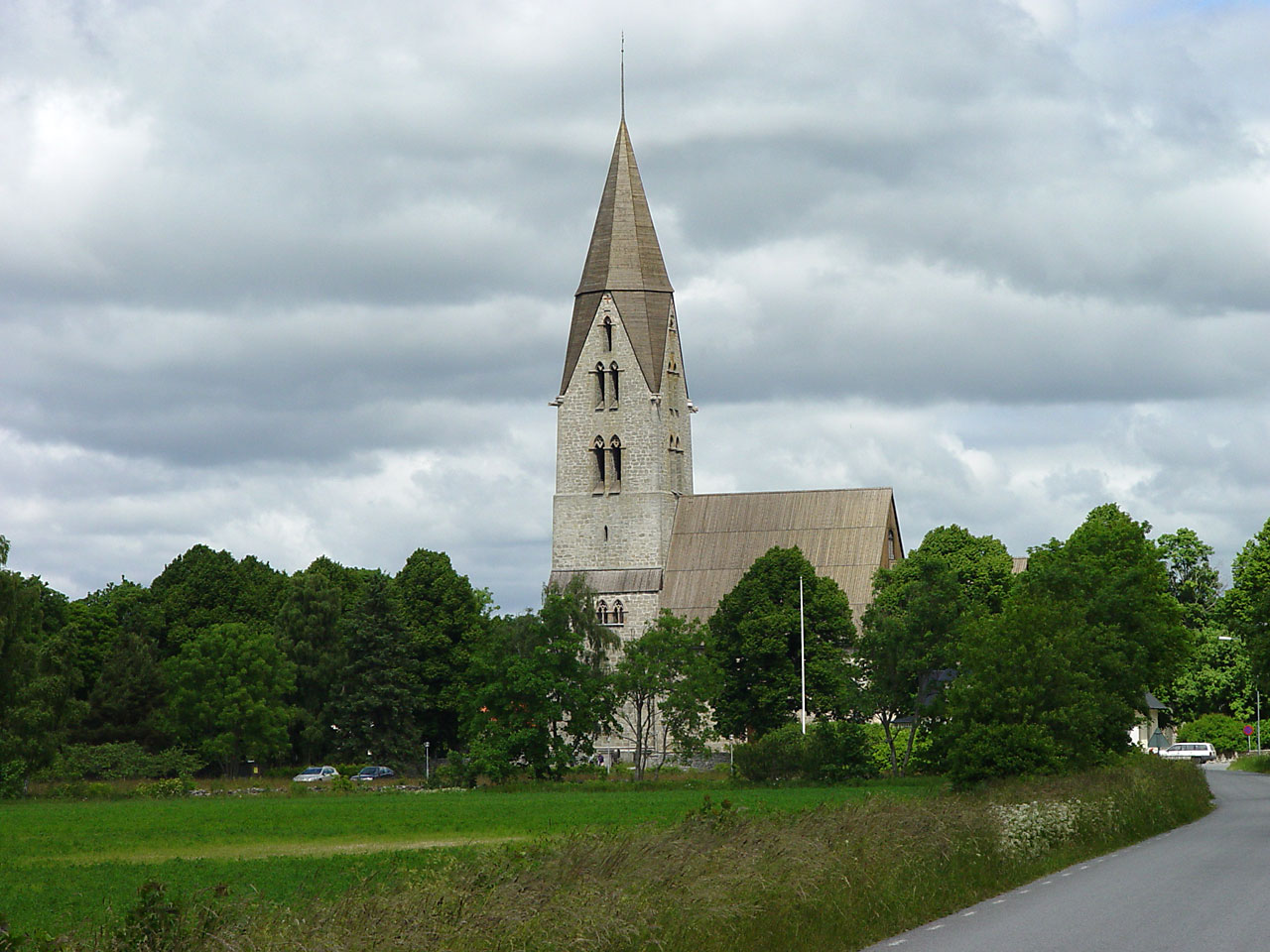
- Öja Church

- Location within Gotland
- Coordinates: 57°2′7″N 18°18′0″E
- Country: Sweden
- Province: Gotland
- County: Gotland County
- Municipality: Gotland Municipality

Area
  - Total: 38.19 km^{2} (14.75 sq mi)

Population (2014)
  - Total: 479
- Time zone: UTC+1 (CET)
  - Summer (DST): UTC+2 (CEST)

Öja is a populated area, a socken (not to be confused with parish), on the Swedish island of Gotland. It comprises the same area as the administrative Öja District, established on 1 January 2016.

== Geography ==
Öja is situated partly on the narrow southern isthmus that connects the Storsudret peninsula to Gotland and partly on the peninsula itself. The medieval Öja Church, part of the Evangelical-Lutheran Church of Sweden, is located in the socken. The locality Burgsvik is in the west part of Öja. As of 2019, Öja Church belongs to Hoburg parish in Sudrets pastorat, along with the churches in Hamra, Vamlingbo, Sundre and Fide.

One of the asteroids in the asteroid belt, 10123 Fideöja, is named after this place and the neighboring Fide socken.

== Öjamadonnan ==
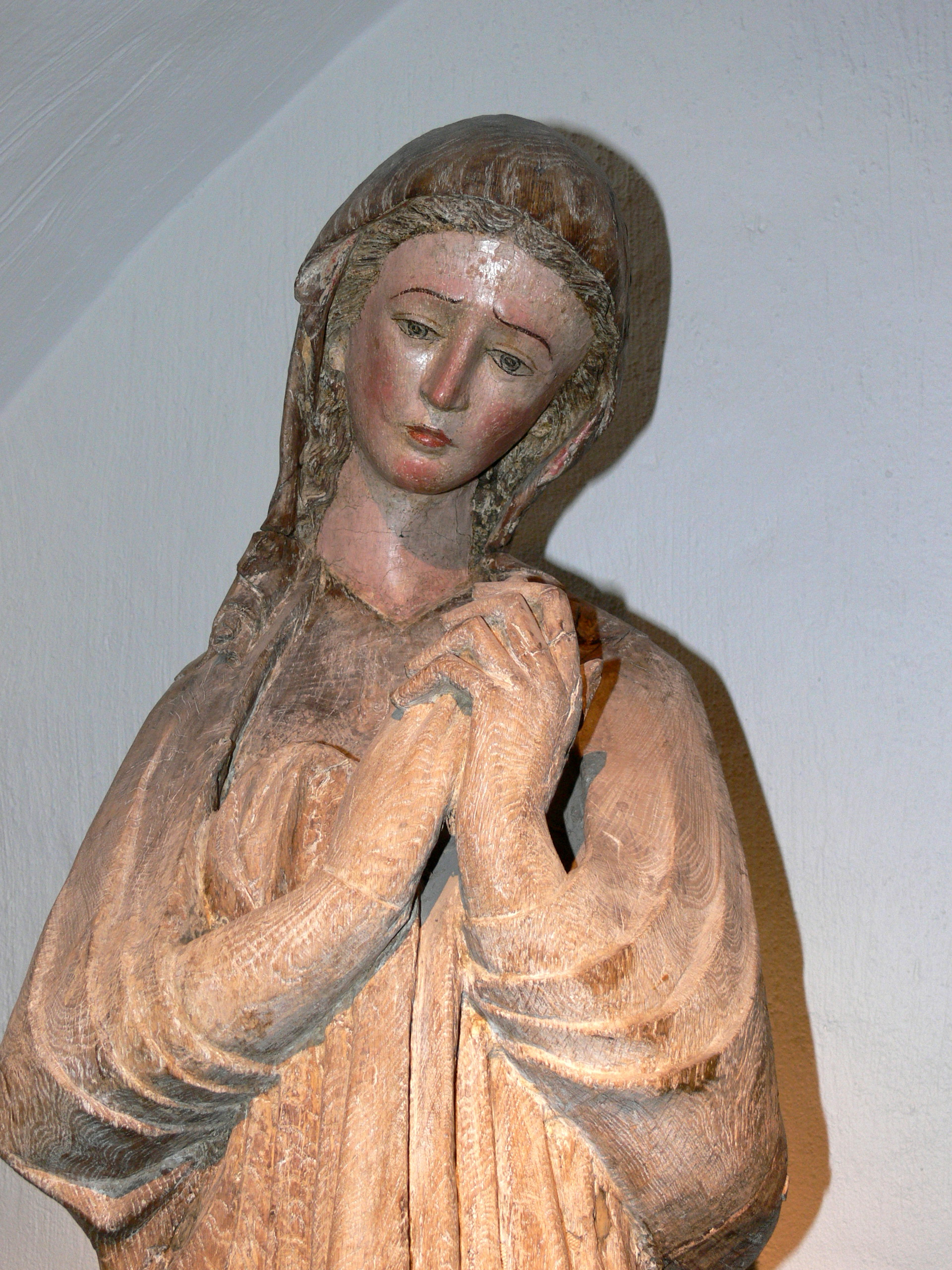
Öjamadonnan

Öja is mostly known for the 1.5 m (4.9 ft), 13th century, wooden sculpture Öjamadonnan ("The Öja Madonna"), a Stabat Mater representation of the Virgin Mary. The Catholic statue was removed from the Öja Church during the Swedish Reformation and stowed away in a woodshed. It was later retrieved by Gotland Museum, renovated in 1948 and it is now displayed in the museum. A replica of the statue for the Evangelical-Lutheran Öja Church, was later made by sculptor Bertil Nyström. The sculpture has been chosen as one of the Treasured Objects in Sweden.

== See also ==
- Visby Saint Mary's Evangelical-Lutheran Cathedral, which contains an icon of Our Lady of Öja
- Lutheran Mariology, an overview on Evangelical-Lutheran Marian devotion
