= Fide Church =

- Fide kyrka
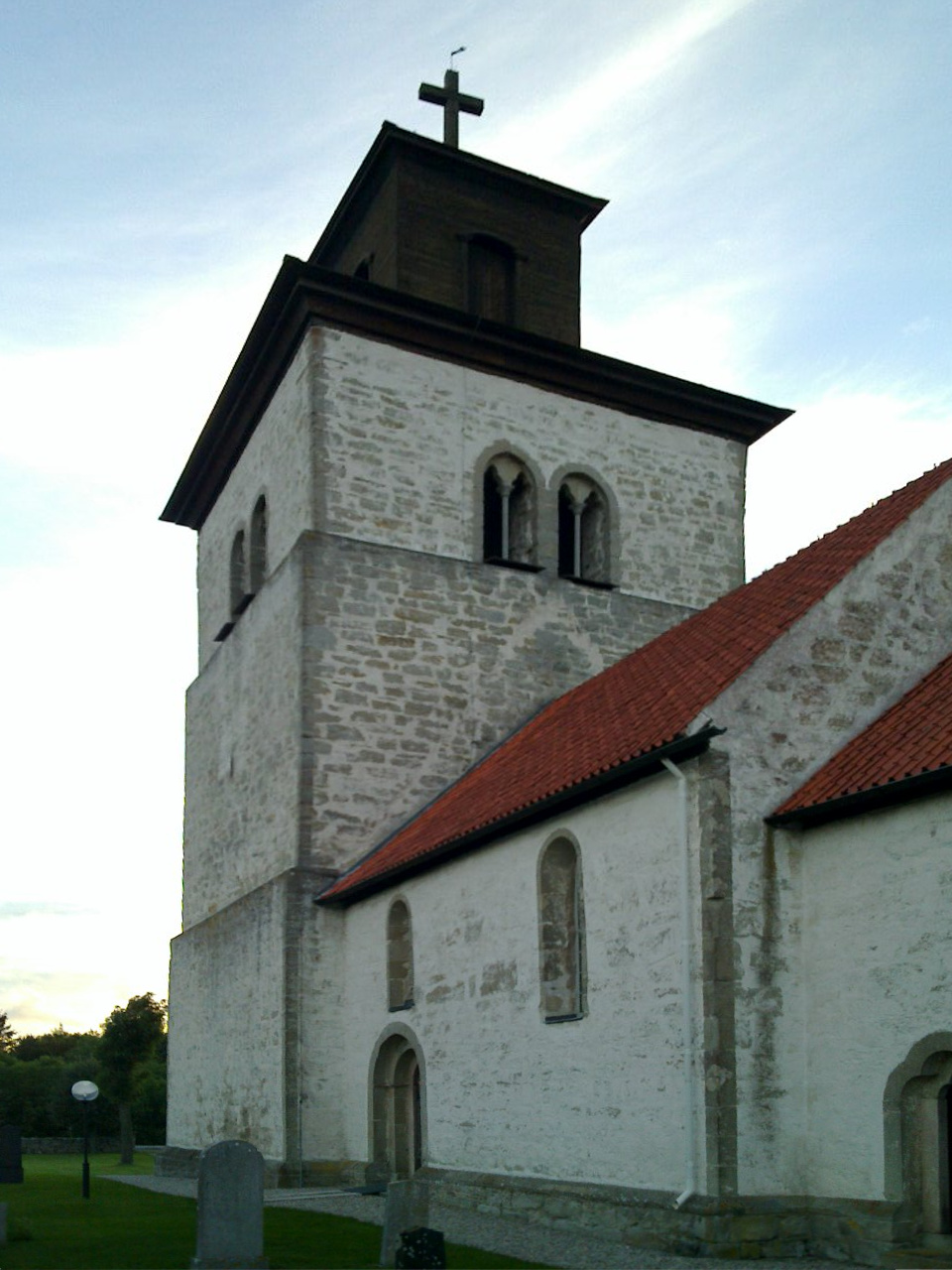
- Fide Church, view of the exterior

- Location on Gotland
- 57°04′25″N 18°18′58″E
- Country: Sweden
- Denomination: Church of Sweden

Administration
- Diocese: Visby

Fide Church (Swedish: Fide kyrka) is a medieval church in Fide on the Swedish island of Gotland, surrounded by an unusually well-preserved medieval cemetery. Belonging to the Church of Sweden, it lies in the Diocese of Visby.

== History and architecture ==
Fide Church dates from the 13th century. Oldest are the nave and choir, while the tower was added slightly later. The roof lantern which gives the top of the tower its distinctive shape is however considerably later, from 1826.

The church lies in an unusually well-preserved medieval cemetery which is surrounded by a low wall in which three medieval lych gates still sits. The building material of the church is sandstone. The exterior of the church is rather plain, but unusually the church still has the original windows, which have never been enlarged.

Inside, the church is decorated with murals from two different periods. The oldest are from the early 15th century and includes religious subjects as well as an inscription in Latin that has been interpreted as a lamentation of the Battle of Visby in 1361. In translation it reads: "The field is burnt and the men cry, beaten and in pain under the sword." The other, somewhat later set of murals depict scenes from the Passion of Christ and has been attributed to the Master of the Passion of Christ. Among the furnishings, especially the medieval (early 15th century) altarpiece deserves mention. The church furthermore has a triumphal cross from the time of the construction of the church, and one of the oldest pulpits on Gotland, from 1587.
