= Hamra Church, Gotland =

Hamra Church
- Hamra kyrka
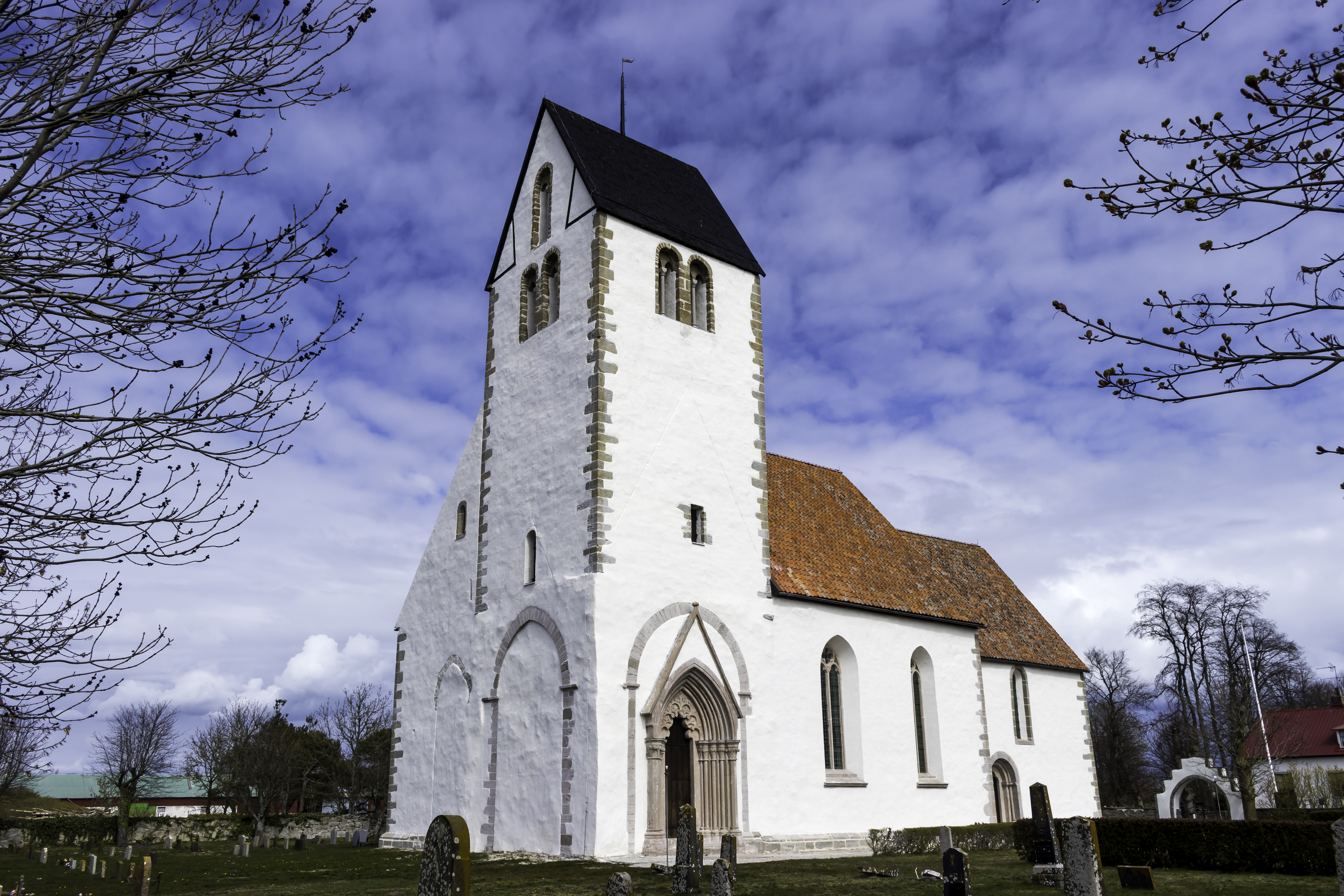
- Hamra Church

- Location on Gotland
- 56°58′33″N 18°18′48″E
- Country: Sweden
- Denomination: Church of Sweden

Administration
- Diocese: Visby

Hamra Church (Swedish: Hamra kyrka) is a medieval church in Hamra, Gotland, Sweden.

== History ==
Hamra Church was initially planned as a basilica, three bays wide, but only the chancel, the transept and the tower above the crossing were built. A nave was never built. This first construction phase was in the middle of the 13th century. In the early 14th century, the church was then heavily altered. The chancel and the south transept were demolished, and the church transformed into a two bay wide nave with a narrower chancel. Several parts of the demolished building were at the same time re-used.

The church was renovated in 1953 and again in 1973–74.

== Architecture and furnishings ==
The church is characterised by its complex building history, which is discernible in the different parts of the building both outside and inside. Even so, the church as it stands today has a plan typical for churches on Gotland with a broad nave and a narrower chancel. The inside of the church is decorated with church murals, both from the 15th century (by the so-called Passion Master) and from the 18th century.

The church contains several medieval wooden sculptures. The rood cross and the figures belonging to it are from the middle or late 14th century. Another group of sculptures is from around 1280, stylistically related to the large rood cross in Öja Church. Furthermore, three wooden sculptures from the 15th century (depicting Christ, Saint George, and the Coronation of the Virgin) also belong to the church. The decorated baptismal font is also medieval, made at the end of the 12th century by the Romanesque sculptor known by the notname Semibyzantios. The reliefs around the basin depict scenes from the childhood of Christ and Saint Michael.

== Sources cited ==
- Jacobsson, Britta; Johansson, Eva; Johansson, Per; Andersson, Rolf (1990). Våra kyrkor [Our churches]. Västervik: Klarkullens förlag AB. ISBN 91-971561-08.
- Lagerlöf, Erland; Svahnström, Gunnar (1991). Gotlands kyrkor [Churches of Gotland] (in Swedish) (4th ed.). Stockholm: Rabén & Sjögren. ISBN 91-29-61598-4.
