= Hamra, Gotland =

Area of Gotland, Sweden

Hamra
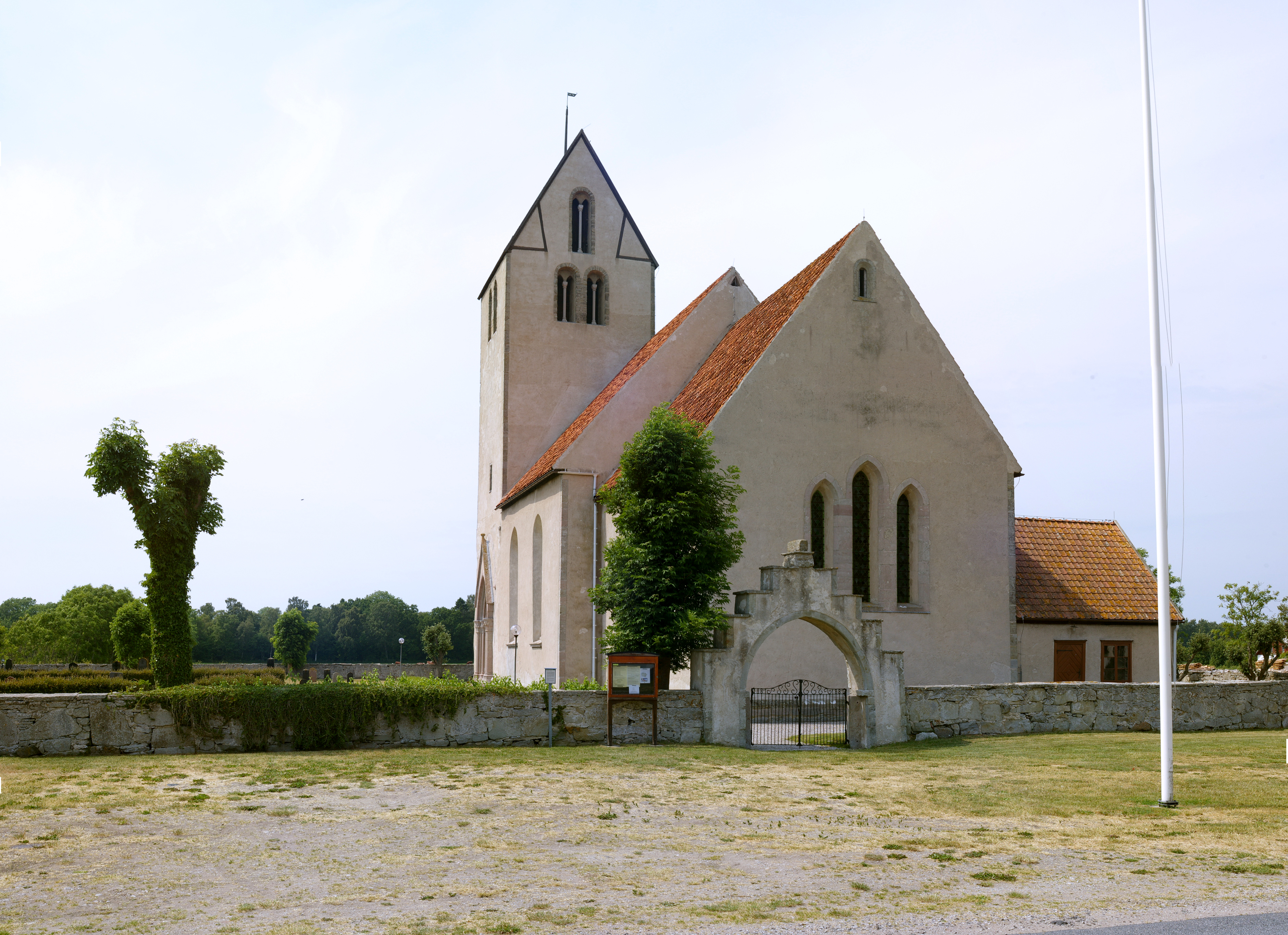
- Hamra Church

- Location within Gotland
- Coordinates: 56°58′33″N 18°18′48″E
- Country: Sweden
- Province: Gotland
- County: Gotland County
- Municipality: Gotland Municipality

Area
  - Total: 20.2 km^{2} (7.8 sq mi)

Population (2014)
  - Total: 107
- Time zone: UTC+1 (CET)
  - Summer (DST): UTC+2 (CEST)
- Website: www.hamragotland.se

Hamra is a populated area, a socken (not to be confused with parish), on the Swedish island of Gotland. It comprises the same area as the administrative Hamra District, established on 1 January 2016.

== Geography ==
Hamra is situated on the southeastern tip of Gotland. The medieval Hamra Church is located in the socken. The small Vändburg harbor and Hammarhage Hällar sea stack area are also in Hamra. Hamra has given its name to the Hamra formation, one of the Silurian sedimentary rock formations which make up Gotland.

As of 2019, Hamra Church belongs to Hoburg parish in Sudrets pastorat, along with the churches in Öja, Vamlingbo, Sundre and Fide.

One of the asteroids in the asteroid belt, 9373 Hamra, is named after this place.
