= Paris Nesbit =

Australian lawyer (1852–1927)

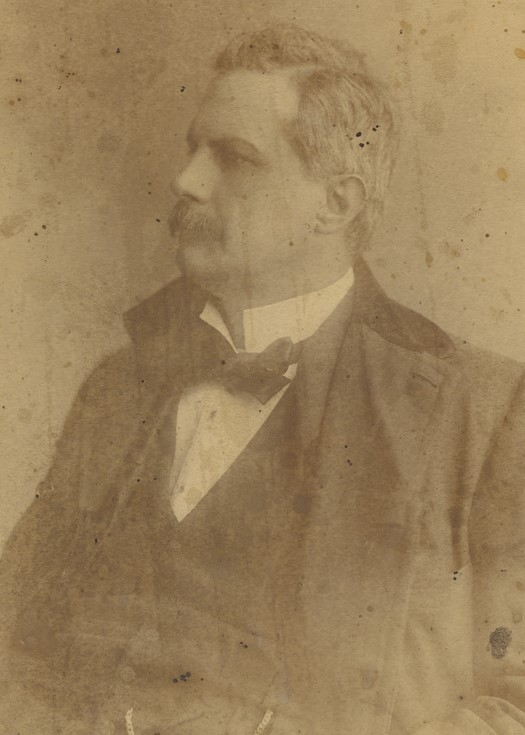
- Born: 8 August 1852
- Died: 31 March 1927 (aged 74)
- Occupation: Barrister

Paris Nesbit, QC (born Edward Pariss Nesbit; 8 August 1852 – 31 March 1927), was an Australian lawyer.

== Early life and education ==
Nesbit was born at Angaston in South Australia to schoolmaster Edward Planta Nesbit and Ann, née Pariss. He was a cousin of the English writer Edith Nesbit. His mother died when he was two. Something of a child prodigy, by the age of ten Nesbit could speak German, French and Latin, and had translated the works of Johann Wolfgang von Goethe and Friedrich Schiller into English.

Nesbit attended Rev. Gustav Rechner's school at Light's Pass and M. P. F. Basedow's grammar school at Tanunda, topping the scholarship examinations for South Australia; he also studied music with Carl Linger. In 1868, having worked briefly in a bank, he was articled as a clerk to Rupert Ingleby, QC. He formed the Articled Clerks' Debating Society with Charles Kingston and edited the organisation's journals; his political views developed in a progressive vein.

== Legal career ==
Nesbit was called to the Bar in 1873 and embarked on a successful career in the courts. In 1880 he joined in partnership with Rupert Ingleby and Eustace B. Gundy, which in 1883 admitted Rupert Pelly to form Grundy, Nesbit & Pelly; in 1884 Nesbit left the partnership.

He drafted a number of parliamentary laws in the 1880s, and was appointed Queen's Counsel in 1893. In 1896 he formally changed his name to "Paris Nesbit"; he was widely acknowledged joint leader of the Bar with Josiah Symon.

=== Stints in lunatic asylums ===
Nesbit's career was dogged by scandal, the first of which broke in 1885 when he was arrested for wilful trespass in Melbourne, apparently pursuing a lady who spurned him. He spent a week in Melbourne Gaol before being sent to Kew Lunatic Asylum, having been certified a lunatic. After several months he was released and sent back to South Australia, but on the steamer back to Adelaide he jumped overboard and swam back to Melbourne, where he was returned to the asylum. He began to acquire something of a reputation and was described in Adelaide gossip as an "absinthe-drinking, woman-loving, tobacco-enslaved ... Prince of Bohemia". He was a talented painter, a member of the Adelaide Easel Club, a Shakespeare scholar, and an engaging speaker. He was confined again in 1896 in Adelaide Lunatic Asylum.

In Parkside Asylum from January to July 1898, the Kingston government illegally imposed a detention order to avoid his release but was overruled by the Supreme Court. After his release he published The Beaten Side, a tract against Darwinism, and in 1900, with his sister Agnes Benham, he launched Morning (renamed Morning Star in 1902), a weekly publication that championed Nesbit's causes.

== Politics ==
Nesbit ran unsuccessfully for the South Australian House of Assembly in 1884 and 1896, in the second as a firm opponent of Charles Kingston. He was a strong supporter of Federation.

He contested Labor preselection for the 1906 federal election but was defeated, resigned from the Labor Party and defected to the Liberal Union, which he helped organise. The Liberals' views proved incompatible with his own, however, and at the 1910 election he contested Boothby as an independent.

== Personal life ==
Nesbit married Ellen Logue – aunt of speech therapist Lionel Logue – on 9 December 1874 at St Paul's Anglican Church in Adelaide. After his estranged wife's death on 16 February 1921, he married his long-time mistress, actress and divorcee Cecilia Elizabeth Hughes, on 22 February. Nesbit died in 1927 of a perforated duodenal ulcer.
