= Vamlingbo =

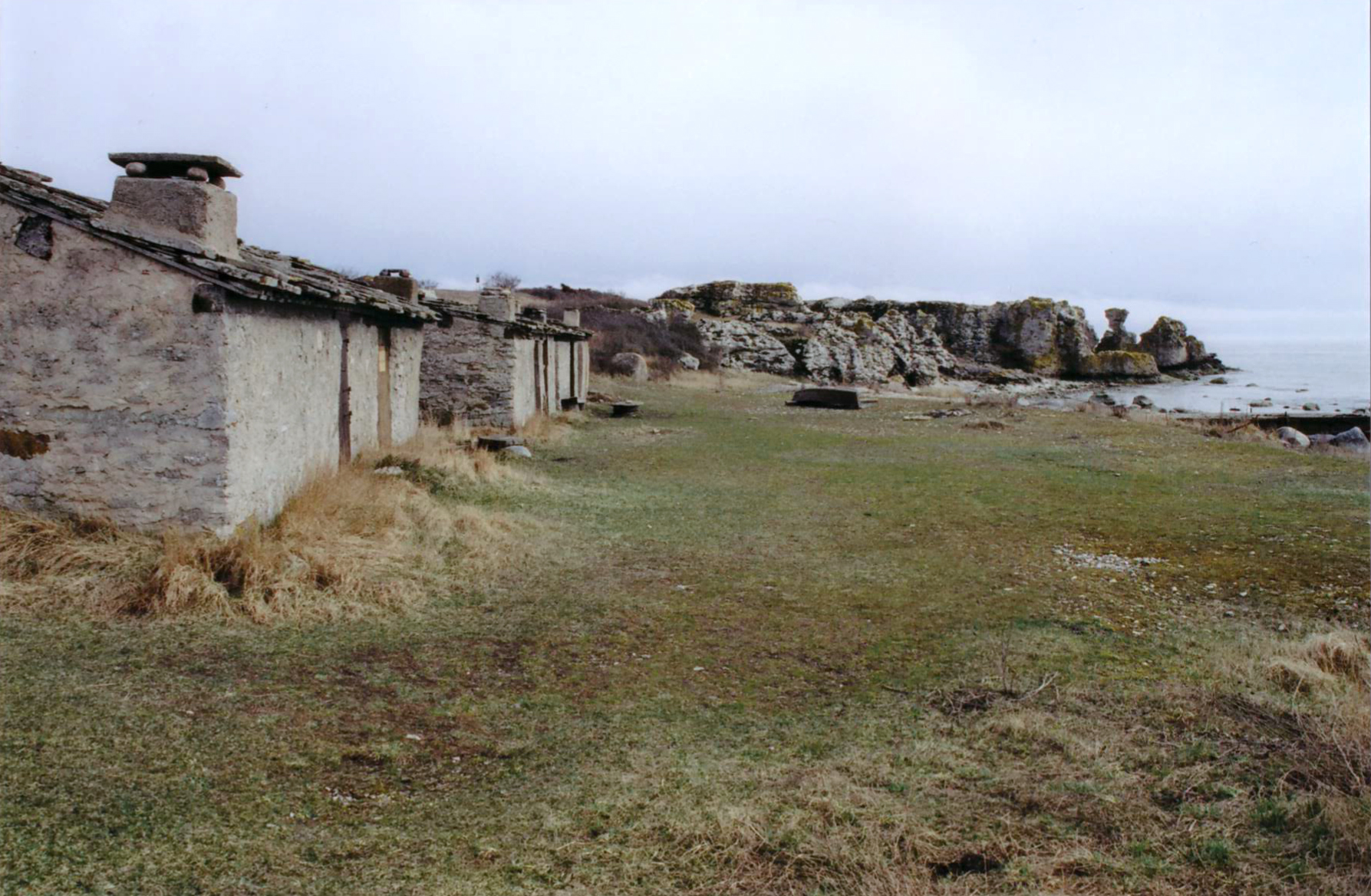
- Holm fishing village, Holmhällar in Vamlingbo

- Location within Gotland
- Coordinates: 56°58′11″N 18°13′49″E
- Country: Sweden
- Province: Gotland
- County: Gotland County
- Municipality: Gotland Municipality

Population (2014)
  - Total: 193
- Time zone: UTC+1 (CET)
  - Summer (DST): UTC+2 (CEST)
- Website: www.vamlingbosocken.se

Vamlingbo is a populated area, a socken (not to be confused with parish), on the Swedish island of Gotland. It comprises the same area as the administrative Vamlingbo District, established on 1 January 2016.

== Geography ==
Vamlingbo is the name of the socken as well as the district. It is also the name of the small village surrounding the medieval Vamlingbo Church, sometimes referred to as Vamlingbo kyrkby. Vamlingbo is situated on the south tip of Gotland.

As of 2019, Vamlingbo Church belongs to Hoburg parish in Sudrets pastorat, along with the churches in Öja, Hamra, Sundre and Fide.

Two of the asteroids in the Asteroid belt, 9372 Vamlingbo and 10105 Holmhällar, are named after this socken and the stack area.

=== Holmhällar ===
Holmhällar is a beach and a rauk area along the Vamlingbo south coast, right across from Heligholmen island. At Holmhällar is the Holm fishing village with stone fishing huts that are several hundred years old. Adjacent to the stack area are the beaches of Skvalpvik and Austre. The coastline is also a 6 ha (15 acres) nature reserve formed in 2008.

== History ==
Some of the most iconic Viking jewelry on Gotland has been found at Vamlingbo. Many of these discoveries are fashioned from gold.

== Community ==
Vamlingbo has attracted several companies and industries. The most noted is the textile company, Vamlingbolaget, founded in 1983 in the tradition of Swedish design collective "Mah-Jong", a noted brand during the 1960s and 1970s.

The Holmhällar pension is south of Vamlingbo right on the sandy beach.

== Gallery ==
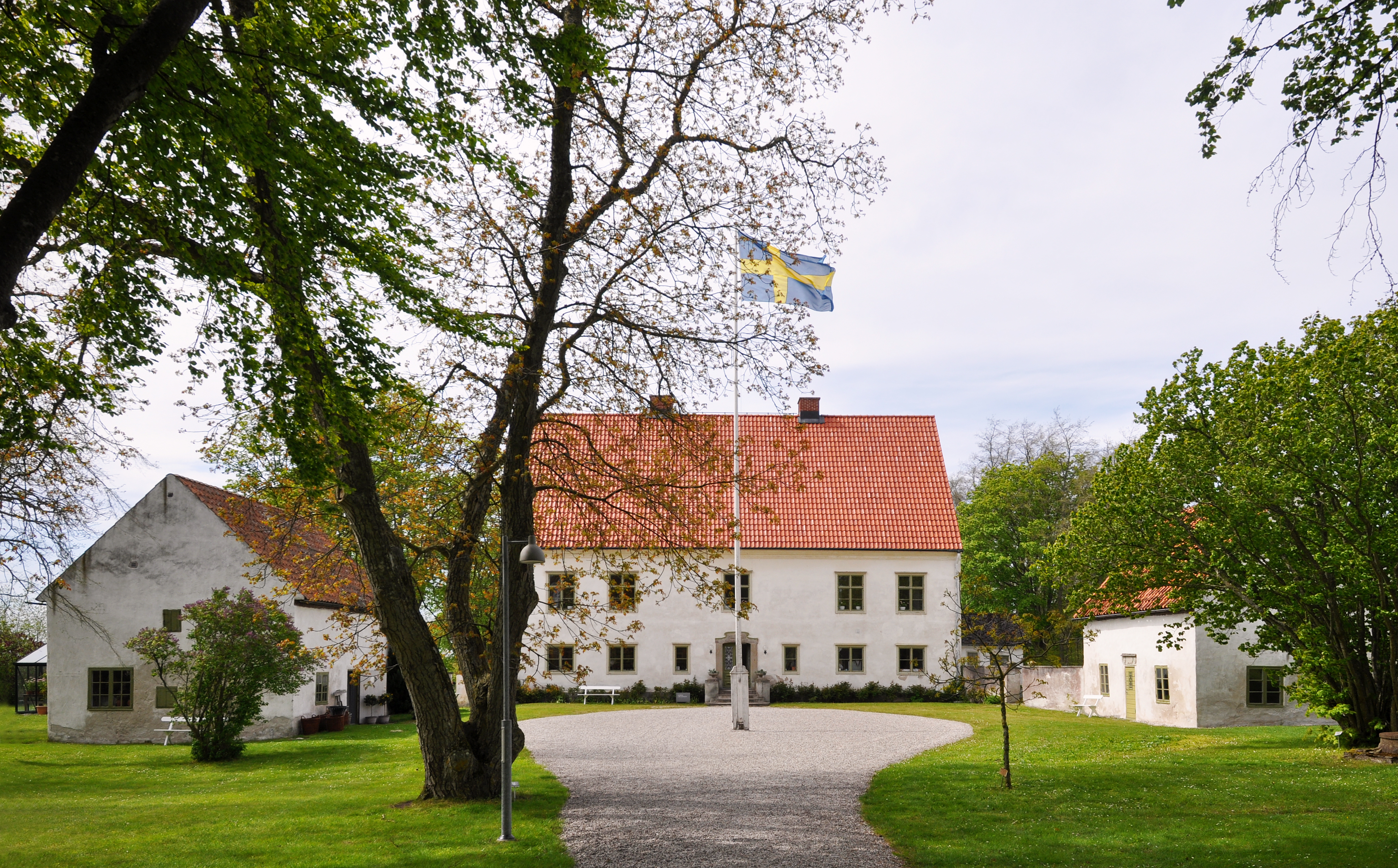
Vamlingbo rectory.

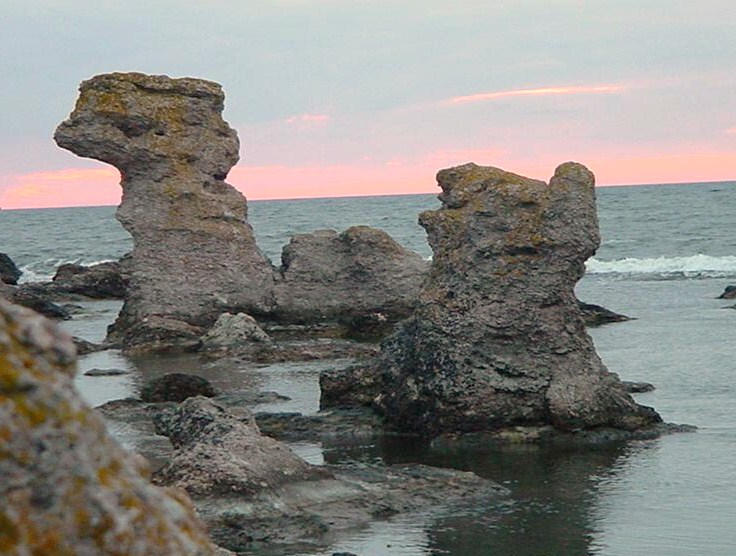
Rauks at Holmhällar

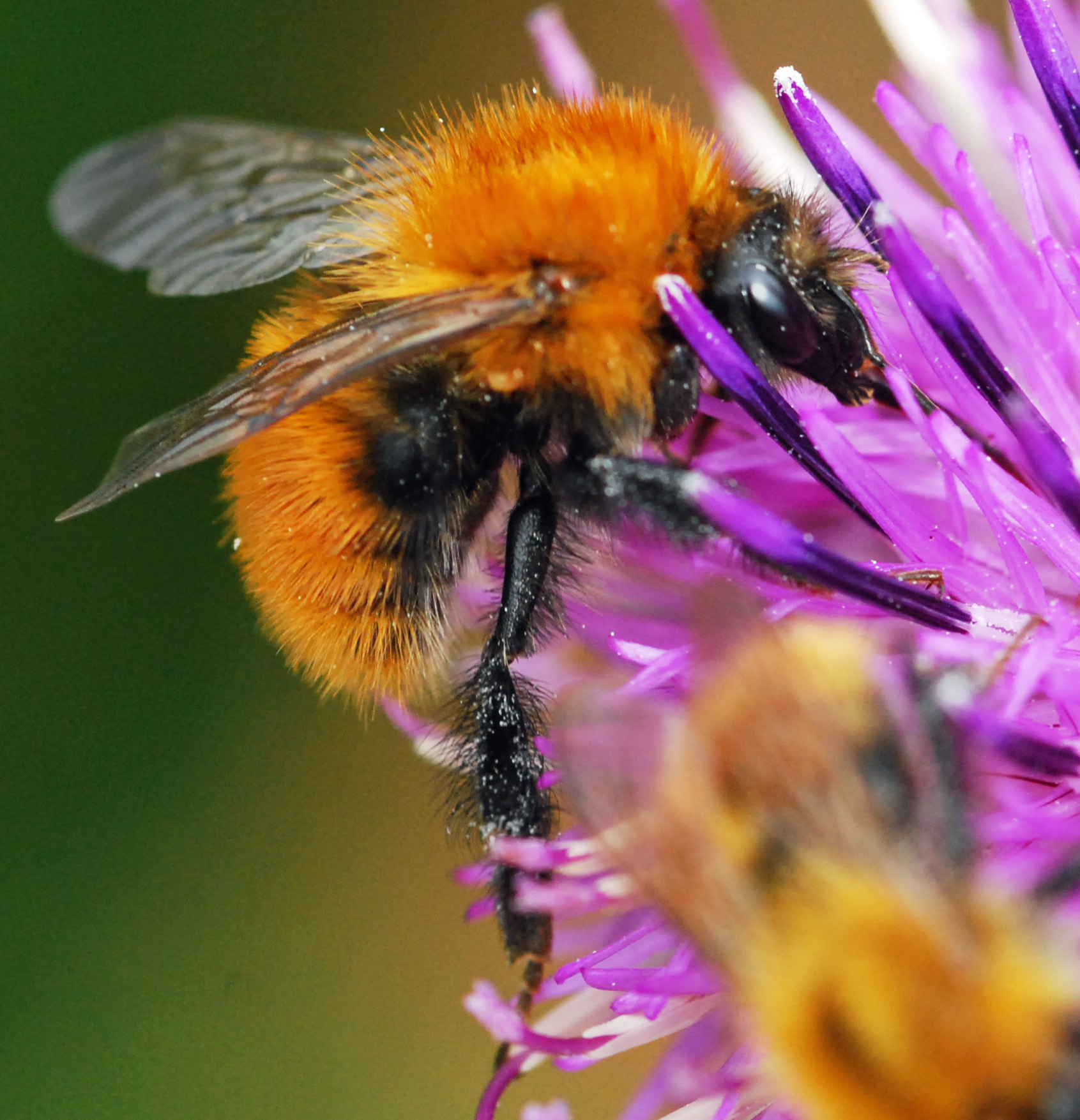
Flora and fauna at Holmhällar
