= Hoburg Shoal =

Hoburg Shoal Hoburgs bank
- Submerged bank
- Hoburg Shoal (Baltic Sea)
- Coordinates: 56°47′N 18°10′E
- Country: Sweden
- County: Gotland County
- Sea: Baltic Sea
- Minimum depth: 10 m (33 ft)

Area
  - Total: 1,226.28 km^{2} (473.47 sq mi)

Hoburg Shoal, also known as Hoburgs bank, is a shoal located in the Baltic Sea, in the southern zone of the Gotland shelf, south of Hoburgen.

The shoal is a bird reserve encompassing about 1,226.28 km^{2} (473.47 mi^{2}).

== Geography ==
It is a long shoal, comprising a northern and a southern section, that lies to the south of the Storsudret peninsula in Sundre socken on the southern tip of Gotland, Sweden. The submerged shoal's water depths range between about 15 and 40 metres (49 and 131 ft).

== History ==
As of 2016, a pipeline is projected that may cross the area of the shoal.
