= Heligholmen =

Island in Sweden

Coordinates: 56°55.426′N 18°17.041′E

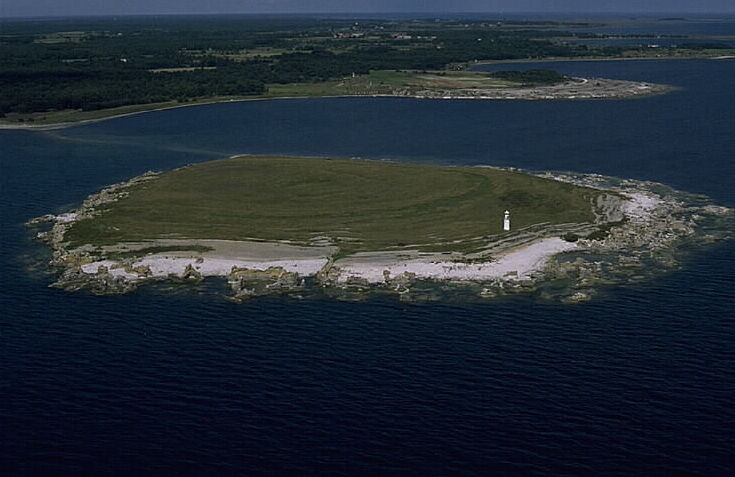
Heligholmen, 1996

Heligholmen is an island off the south coast of Vamlingbo, Gotland, Sweden, with an area of 11.8 hectares (29 acres). It is uninhabited and its only building is a small lighthouse. Heligholmen is a bird reserve. In 1741, Carl Linnaeus, visited the island and described it in his book Öländska och Gothländska Resa.
