= Fide, Gotland =

Fide
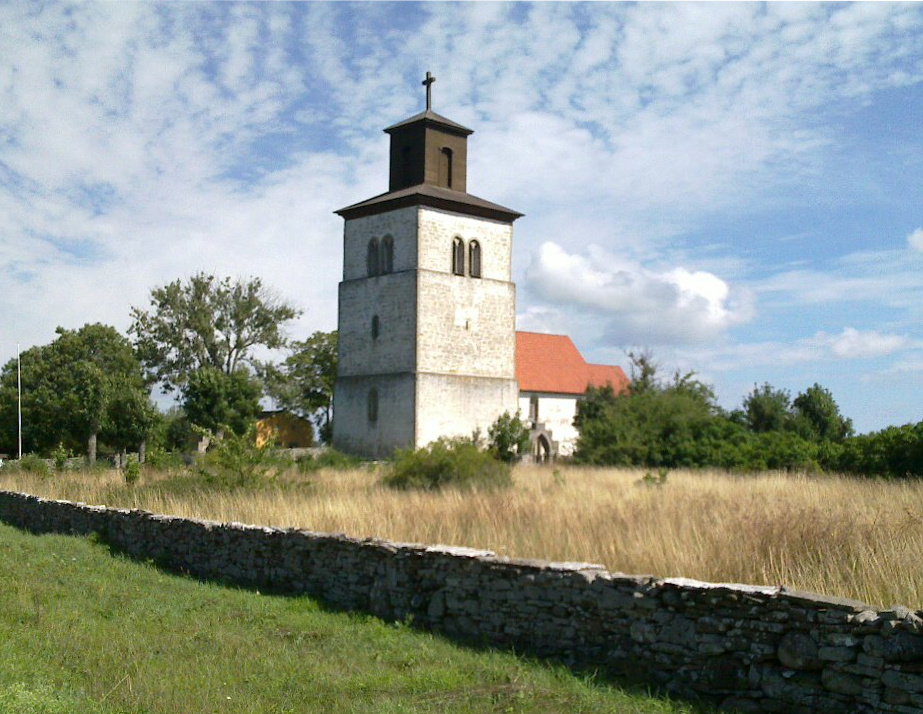
- Fide Church

- Location within Gotland
- Coordinates: 57°4′25″N 18°18′58″E
- Country: Sweden
- Province: Gotland
- County: Gotland County
- Municipality: Gotland Municipality

Area
  - Total: 15.01 km^{2} (5.80 sq mi)

Population (2014)
  - Total: 118
- Time zone: UTC+1 (CET)
  - Summer (DST): UTC+2 (CEST)

Fide is a populated area, a socken (not to be confused with parish), on the Swedish island of Gotland. It comprises the same area as the administrative Fide District, established on 1 January 2016.

== Geography ==
Fide is situated on the narrow southern isthmus that connects the Storsudret peninsula to Gotland. The medieval Fide Church is located in the socken. As of 2019, Fide Church belongs to Hoburg parish in Sudrets pastorat, along with the churches in Öja, Hamra, Vamlingbo and Sundre.

One of the asteroids in the asteroid belt, 10123 Fideöja, is named after this place and the neighboring Öja socken.

== History ==
On a wall of the Fide Church is a 115 by 92 cm (45 by 36 in) piece of 13th-century graffiti depicting a ship. It was carved into the plaster while it was still soft during the construction of the church. It is the first image of a cog in the world. The proportions differ slightly from those of the later medieval cogs and it corresponds with a cog-like ship from the 12th century, found at Kronholmen in Västergarn during the construction of a golf course. Both the image and the ship find are seen as examples of boats in the transition from Viking longships to cogs. Similar carving have been found on the walls of the church tower in Ala.
