= Byrums raukar =

Nature reserve in Sweden

Coordinates: 57°13′33″N 16°57′19″E

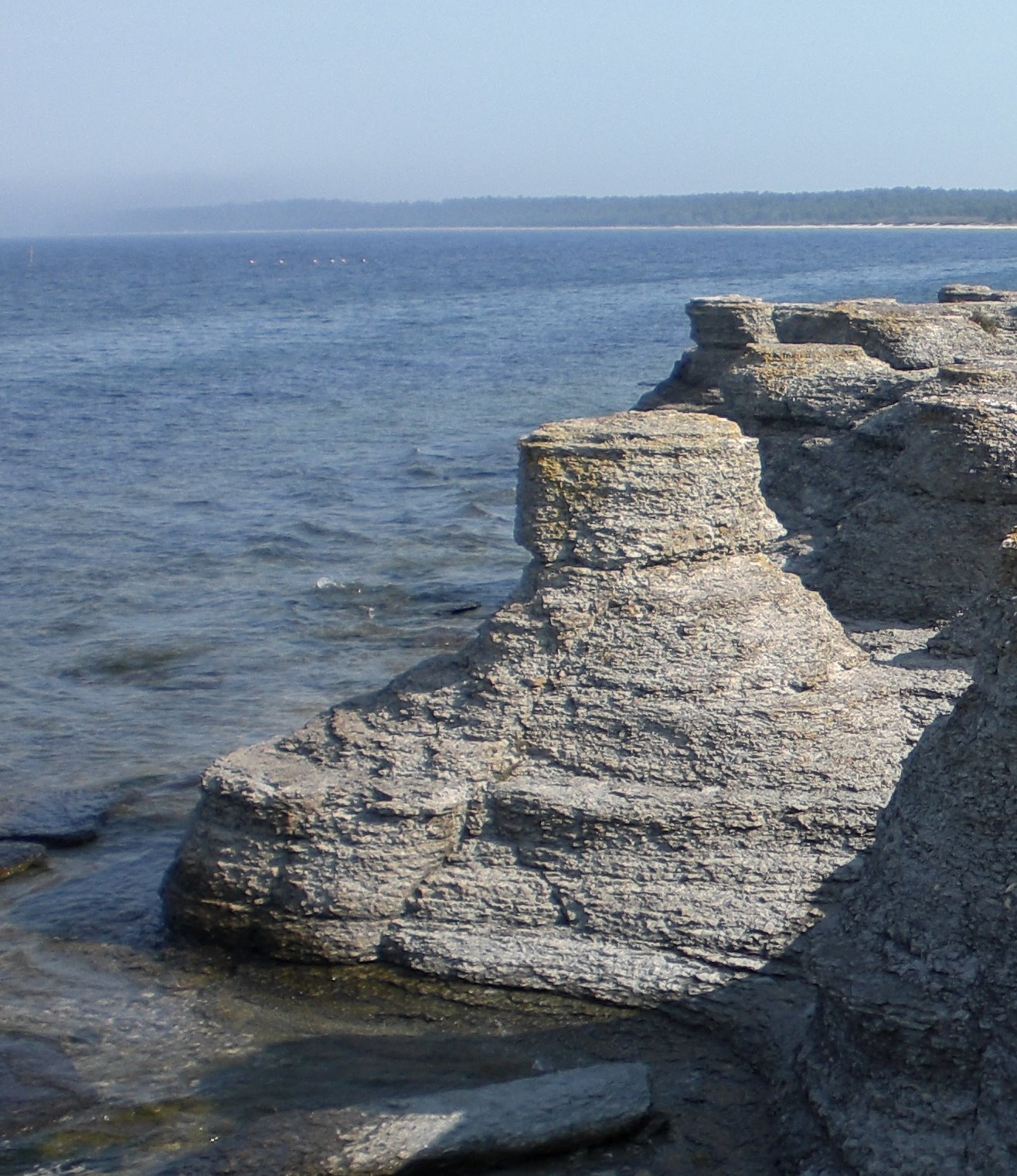
Byrum's raukar

Byrums raukar are a geological formation of a group of rauks (Swedish term for stacks) on the western shore in the north of Öland, Sweden (the island forming the Kalmar Strait with the Swedish mainland) near the village of Byrum. The group consists of about 120 limestone stacks, rich in fossils, of up to 4 m (13 ft) high on a 600 m (2,000 ft) stretch of beach. The area is about 3 hectares, is a Natural Monument III and a nature reserve since 1935.
