= Rauk =

Landform in Sweden and Norway

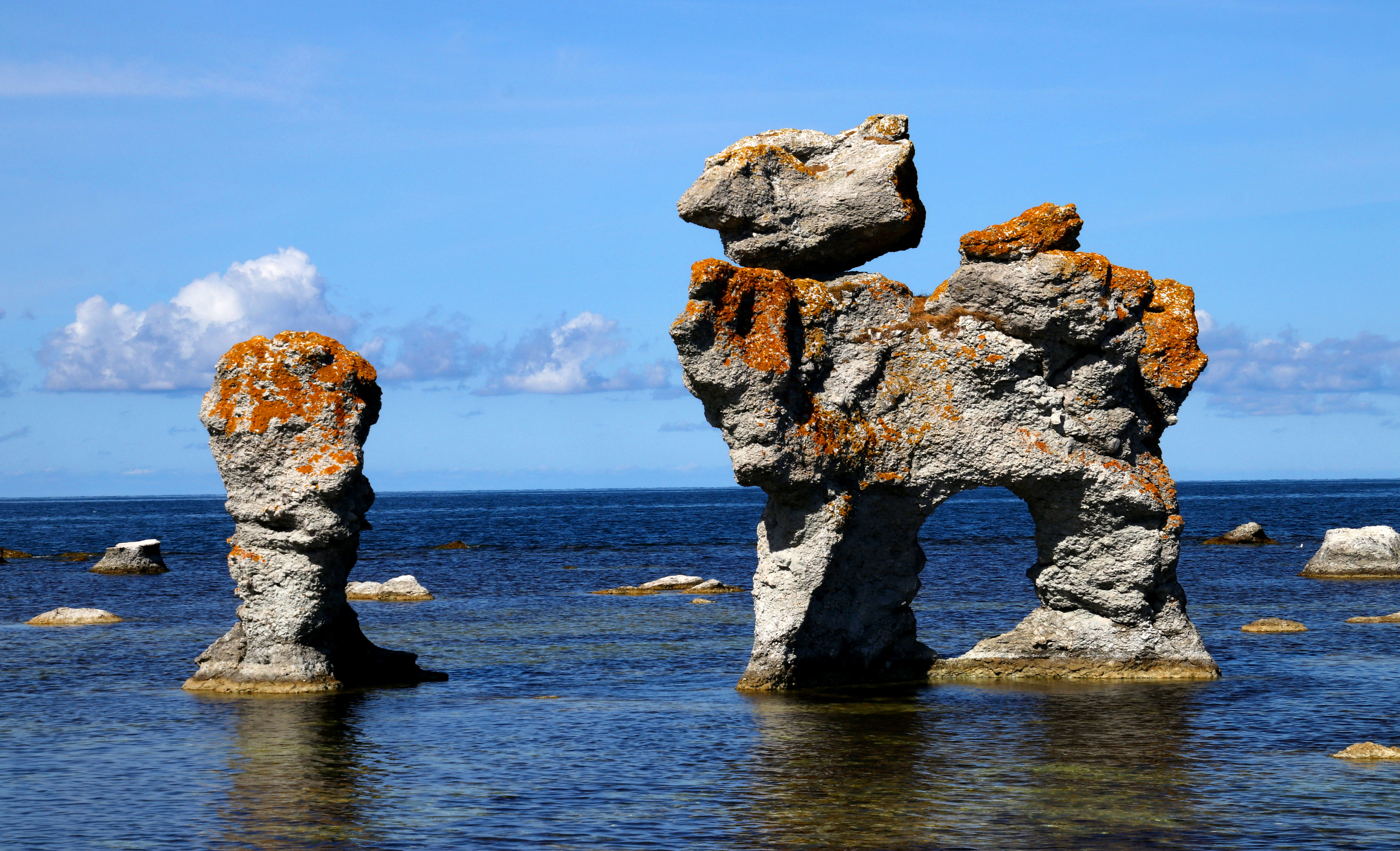
Rauks (rauks) at Fårö Island, east of mainland Sweden

A rauk is a column-like landform in Sweden, often equivalent to a stack. The limestone rauks of Gotland in the Baltic Sea are among the best known examples.

== Sweden ==
Rauks are common on the island of Gotland, Sweden and on the smaller islands belonging to Gotland County. Rauks in Gotland often occur in groups called raukfält ("rauk fields"). Fårö island north of Gotland and Vamlingbo at the southern end of Gotland (Holmhällars raukfält) are particularly rich in rauks. Rauks can be found both near and away from Gotland's many cliffs.

Other localities with rauks include Byrum on northwestern Öland neighboring Blå Jungfrun island, Hovs Hallar and Kullaberg in northwestern Scania, and Härnön in northern Sweden's High Coast. Rauks on Öland are made up of limestone. A few rauks are located in the Scandinavian Mountains in northern Sweden's Sarek and Padjelanta national parks.

== Norway ==
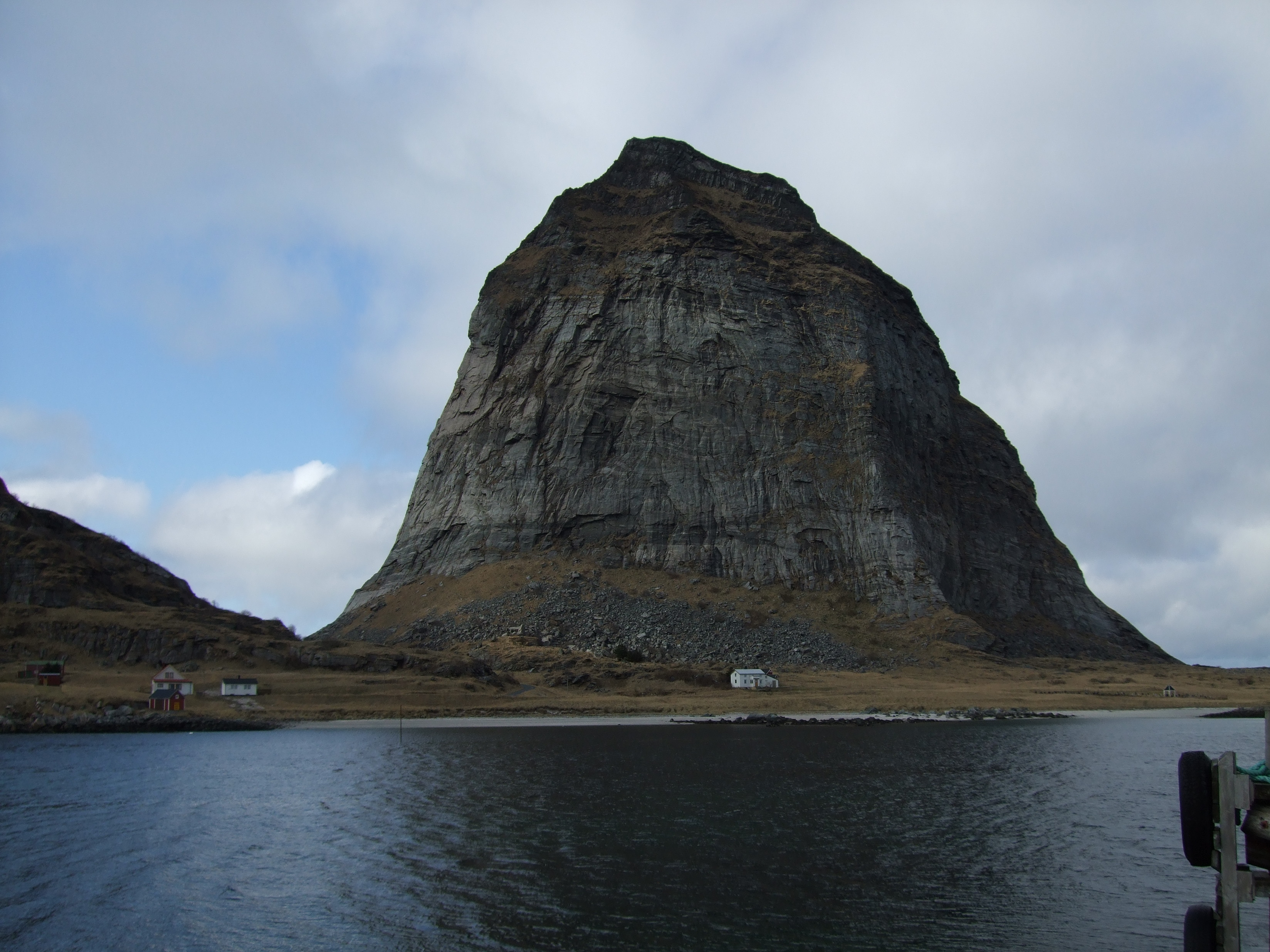
Trænstaven mountain in Træna Municipality is a rauk amidst the strandflat landscape of Norway's coast.

In Norway, there are rauks in Trollholmsund where, according to local lore, the rauks are petrified trolls. In Trollholmsund, rauks are made up of dolomite rock. Varanger Peninsula in northern Norway is rich in rauks and they also occur elsewhere along the Finnmark coastline.

In Norway the term rauk is also applied to isolated residual mountains in the flat strandflat landscape along the coast.

== Geology ==
Rauks are usually formed by wave erosion. On Öland and Gotland, rauks are chiefly formed along or near the escarpment known as the Baltic Klint. Gotland rauks consist of limestone representing reefs that existed in the Silurian period. As waves batter against limestone cliffs, pre-existing vertical fractures begin to erode and widen. Eventually this leads to the formation of caves that merge, and the remaining central rock has now become rauks.

The rauks of Gotland formed after the last ice age. It is unclear to which extent different rauks in Gotland started to form from a cliffed coast, a dissected coast or from glacial landforms. A comparison of photographs from 1900 and from 1966 has shown that some rauks had been destroyed during that period.

Carl Linnaeus, who visited Gotland in 1741, was the first scientist to describe rauks. He called them stenjättar (stone giants) while also noting the ruiniform shape of some rauks.

In Sarek National Park rauks originate as aeolian landforms, thus, contrary to other rauks, they are shaped more by wind than by water. These rauks are made of sandstone that belongs to the Sierggavággenappe (Swedish: Sierggavággeskollan) of the Scandinavian Caledonides.

== See also ==
- Byrums raukar
- Hoburgen
