= Royal Tar fire =

1836 ship fire

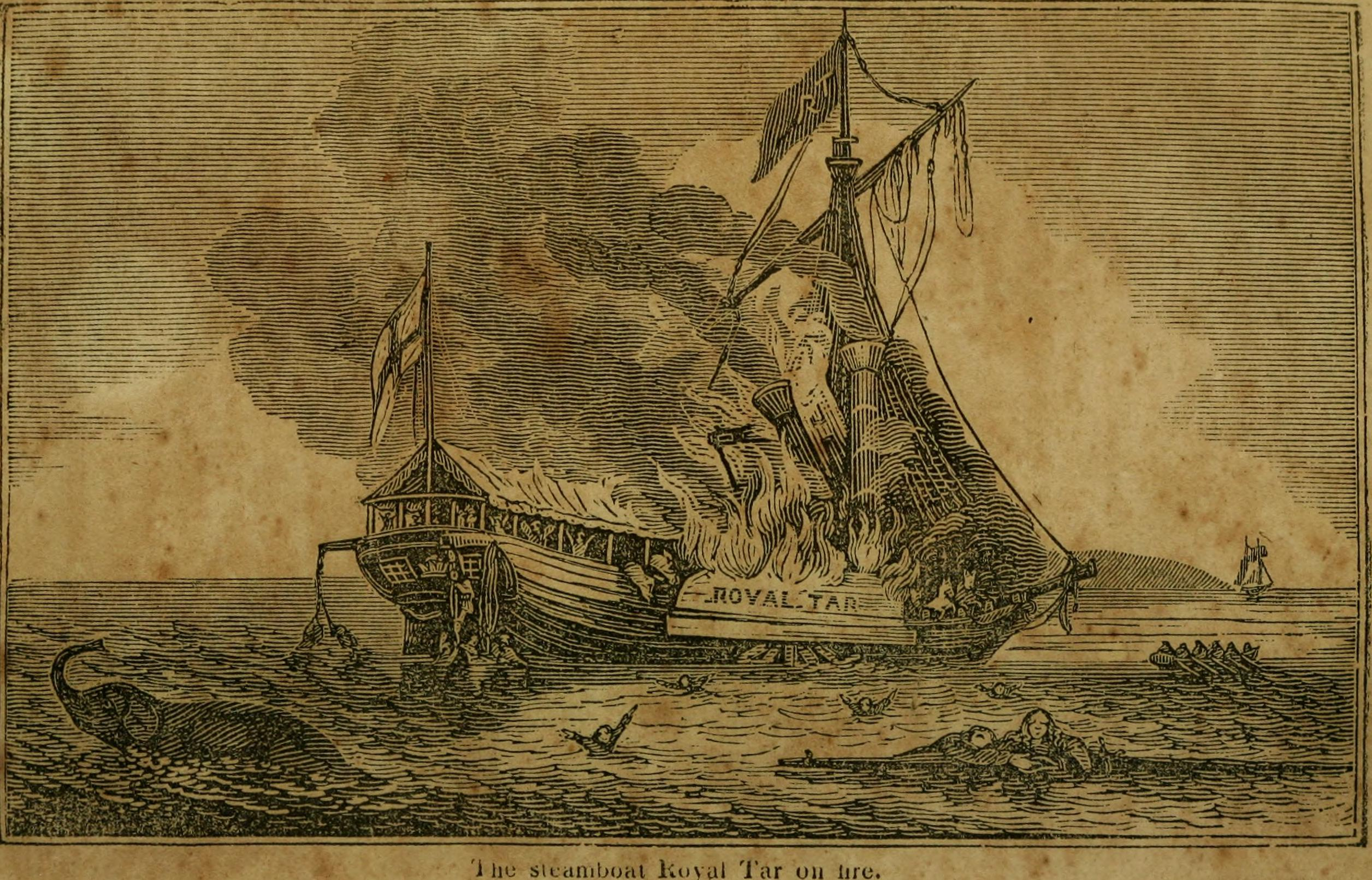

History

Canada
- Name: PSS Royal Tar
- Owner: John Hammond, Daniel McLaughlin and Mackay Brothers & Co.
- Route: Saint John, New Brunswick; Eastport, Maine; Campobello Island, New Brunswick; Portland, Maine
- Builder: William and Isaac Olive, Carleton
- Cost: abt. $40,000
- Laid down: Carleton (St. John, NB)
- Launched: November 1835
- Fate: Burned and sank October 25, 1836 in Penobscot Bay, Maine

General characteristics
- Class & type: Coastal steamer
- Tons burthen: 256 56/94 (bm)
- Length: 156 ft (48 m)
- Beam: 24 ft (7.3 m)
- Sail plan: Schooner-rigged
- Speed: 8 knots (15 km/h; 9.2 mph)
- Complement: 21

The Royal Tar fire was an 1836 ship fire in which the passenger steamship Royal Tar burned while transporting a menagerie with its animals.

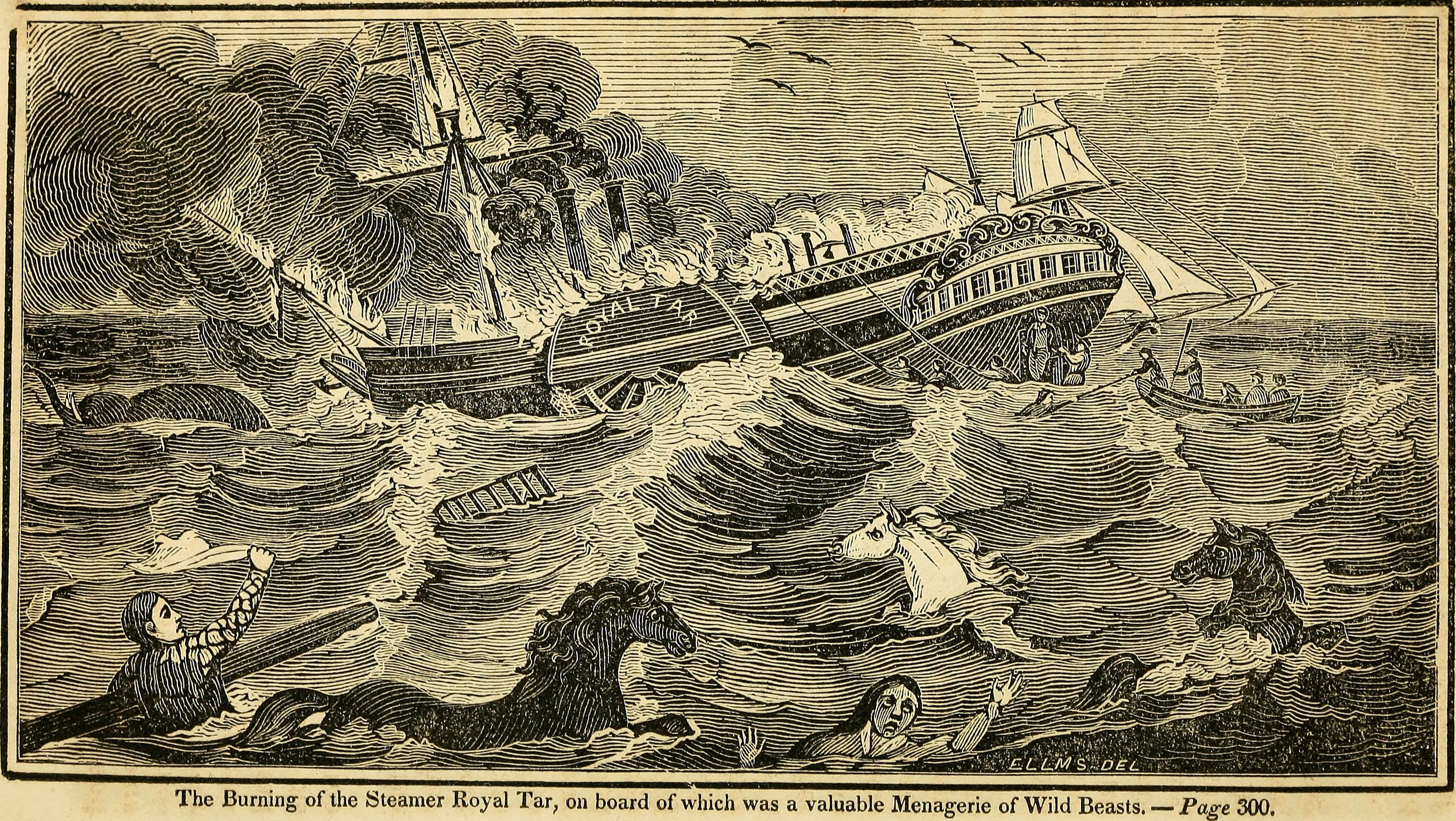
Wreck of Royal Tar

== Ship career ==
Royal Tar was the first steamer on the route between St. John, Eastport and Portland, Maine. It was built at the shipyard of William and Isaac Olive, Carleton, and launched in November 1835.

== Last voyage ==
On sailing from its berth at Peter's wharf, Eastport on October 21, the ship had a crew of 21 and 70 passengers, including a number of women and children. The passenger list was larger than usual as it had the members of a menagerie, Burgess and Dexter's Zoological Institute, managed by a Mr. Fuller. The animals included an elephant, two camels, and a variety of captive beasts and birds. There was also a large waxwork exhibit and a huge show wagon called an omnibus, as well as wagons required for carrying the cages, with the horses needed to pull them. Two of the ship's four lifeboats were offloaded to make room for the animals.

There was heavy weather along the coast in the latter part of October 1836, and when Royal Tar left Eastport on the evening of October 21, the wind was blowing so hard from the westward that the steamer put into Little River (near Cutler) for safety. The gale continued for three days, but on the afternoon of October 24, another attempt was made to resume the voyage. Finding a heavy sea outside and the wind still from the westward, the steamer put into Machias Bay and again came to anchor, remaining until midnight when the wind shifted to the northwest and the voyage was again resumed.

=== Fire ===
At about 1:30 on the afternoon of October 25, the engineer reported that the water had been allowed to get too low in the boiler. On hearing this report, the captain ordered the engine stopped and the safety valve opened, the steamer being brought to anchor about 1 1/2 miles (2.4 km) from the Fox Islands, in Penobscot Bay. The fire in the furnace was extinguished, but in about a half hour the steamer was found to be on fire under the deck over the boiler, near the animal cages. An effort was made to extinguish the flames by means of a hose attached to the pump, but it proved fruitless. The fire spread rapidly and soon consumed the firefighting equipment.

=== Rescue ===
The ship only had two lifeboats remaining. Captain Reed and two of the crew, lowered the small boat at the stern and got into it, in order to prepare rafts and save as many people as possible. Sixteen able-bodied men lowered the second and larger boat and rowed away, until they reached Isle au Haut.

The steamer endeavored to make for the nearest land. Captain Reed stood by with the boat, and as the terrified passengers began to jump overboard, was able to save several lives. Of the animals, only the two horses survived.

The fire was seen by the US revenue cutter Veto, which reached the scene half an hour later. The schooner's boats were small and of little use to the rescue. Captain Reed and his men, however, used their boat to rescue about 40 more persons.

The passengers continued on to Portland.

=== Aftermath ===
On November 12, a schooner arriving at Portland reported having passed the remains of a burned steamer near Cashes Ledge. A traveler's trunk, with about $90 in it was picked up at sea. This was the only trace of the ship recovered, although debris was later spotted.

Early newspaper accounts reported that thirty-two human lives were lost. Actually the number was thirty-three: four men, nine women and ten children.

Several of the St. John survivors became well known locally in the later years, including Andrew Garrison, Captain John Hammond, John Ansley, George Eaton, James H. Fowler, and W. H. Harrison. Stinson Patten, of Fredericton, and J. T. Sherwood, British consul at Portland, were also among the saved.

The ship was uninsured and the total loss was estimated at $100,000. The captain, with others of the crew, reached St. John on the following Saturday, where he learned that his son had died on the same day as the fire.

Captain Reed became harbormaster of St. John in 1841, and died in August 1860. For a number of years it was the custom of the St. John men who survived the disaster to take supper together on the anniversary of the fire.

== Treasure ==
The ship's safe, containing a large number of gold and silver coins, was forgotten during the rescue attempt. Subsequent efforts to find either the wreckage or the safe have proven fruitless.
