= 3D =

3D, 3-D, 3d, or Three D may refer to:

== Science, technology, and mathematics ==
- A three-dimensional space in mathematics

=== Relating to three-dimensionality ===
- 3D computer graphics, computer graphics that use a three-dimensional representation of geometric data
- 3D display, a type of information display that conveys depth to the viewer
- 3D film, a motion picture that gives the illusion of three-dimensional perception
- 3D modeling, developing a representation of any three-dimensional surface or object
- 3D printing, making a three-dimensional solid object of a shape from a digital model
- 3D television, television that conveys depth perception to the viewer
- 3D projection
- 3D rendering
- 3D scanning, making a digital representation of three-dimensional objects
- 3D video game
- Stereoscopy, any technique capable of recording three-dimensional visual information or creating the illusion of depth in an image
- Three-dimensional space

=== Other uses in science and technology ===
- 3-D Secure, a secure protocol for online credit and debit card transactions
- Biela's Comet, a lost periodic comet discovered in 1826, also known as 3D
- British Rail Class 207, sometimes known as 3Ds

== Music ==
=== Artists ===
- Robert Del Naja (born 1965), also known as 3D, English artist and musician in the band Massive Attack
- The 3Ds, a rock band

=== Albums ===
- 3D (Go West album), 2010
- 3-D (I See Stars album), the debut album from the band I See Stars
- 3-D (SPC ECO album)
- 3D (The Three Degrees album), 1979
- 3-D (TLC album), 2002
- 3-D (Wrathchild America album)
- "Weird Al" Yankovic in 3-D, 1984, sometimes simply referred to as 3-D

=== Songs ===
- "3D" (song), a 2023 song by Jungkook featuring Jack Harlow
- "3-D", a song by Cheap Trick from their 1983 album Next Position Please

== Other uses ==
- Threepence (disambiguation), a coin used in several countries, abbreviated as '3d'
- Three D Radio, a community radio station in Adelaide, Australia
- Three Ds of foreign policy, in United States foreign policy
- 3D Aerobatics, a form of flying using flying aircraft to perform specific aerial maneuvers
- 3D (Long Island bus), bus service in New York State
- 3D Test of Antisemitism, put forth by Israeli politician and human rights activist Natan Sharansky
- Middle finger, the third digit (abbreviated 3D) of the hand
- Three-dimensional chess
- The 3D ("Dudley Death Drop"), a professional wrestling double-team maneuver

== See also ==
- 3ds (disambiguation)
- 3rd (disambiguation)
- D3 (disambiguation)
- DDD (disambiguation)
- BBC HD (Used 3D approx 7 times before)
