= 3ds (disambiguation) =

The Nintendo 3DS is a handheld video game console that is a successor to the Nintendo DS.

3ds or 3DS may also refer to:

- Autodesk 3ds Max, a 3D graphics application by Autodesk
- .3ds, the file extension used by 3ds Max
- Dassault Systèmes or 3DS, a 3D software company
- The 3Ds, an alternative pop/rock band from Dunedin, New Zealand
- Three Ds of antisemitism
- Dirty, dangerous and demeaning or 3Ds, an American neologism derived from a Japanese expression that refers to certain undesirable yet necessary jobs
- 3-D Secure, a security protocol for online card transactions
- 3DS (die stacking), a computer memory technology
- Terceira Divisão, abbreviated to 3DS, a football league in Portugal

== See also ==
- 3D (disambiguation)
- DS3 (disambiguation)
- DDDS
