= Executive agreement =

Agreement between heads of government of countries

An executive agreement is an agreement between the heads of government of two or more nations that has not been ratified by the legislature as treaties are ratified. Executive agreements are considered politically binding to distinguish them from treaties which are legally binding.

In the United States, executive agreements are made solely by the president of the United States. They are one of three mechanisms by which the United States enters into binding international obligations. Some authors consider executive agreements to be treaties under international law in that they bind both the United States and another sovereign state. However, under United States constitutional law, executive agreements are not considered treaties for the purpose of the Treaty Clause of the United States Constitution, which requires the advice and consent of two-thirds of the Senate to qualify as a treaty.

Some other nations have similar provisions with regard to the ratification of treaties.

== In general ==
Executive agreements are often used in order to bypass the requirements of national constitutions for ratification of treaties. Many nations that are republics with written constitutions have constitutional rules about the ratification of treaties. The Organization for Security and Co-operation in Europe is based on executive agreements.

== In the United States ==
=== Federal government ===
In the United States, executive agreements are binding internationally if they are negotiated and entered into under the president's authority in foreign policy, as commander-in-chief of the armed forces, or from a prior act of Congress. For instance, as commander-in-chief, the president negotiates and enters into status of forces agreements (SOFAs), which govern the treatment and disposition of U.S. forces stationed in other nations. The president cannot, however, enter unilaterally into executive agreements on matters that are beyond their constitutional authority. In such instances, an agreement would need to be in the form of a congressional-executive agreement, or a treaty with Senate advice and consent.

The U.S. Supreme Court, in United States v. Pink (1942), held that international executive agreements validly made have the same legal status as treaties and did not require Senate approval. In Reid v. Covert (1957), while reaffirming the president's ability to enter into executive agreements, the court also held that such agreements cannot contradict existing federal law or the Constitution.

The Case–Zablocki Act of 1972 requires the president to inform the Senate within 60 days of any executive agreement being made. No restriction was placed on presidential powers to make such agreements. The notification requirement enabled Congress to vote to cancel an executive agreement, or to refuse to fund its implementation.

=== State government ===
Governors or other statewide executive officers may sign onto joint agreements with their counterparts in other state governments which may not have the legal backing of their respective legislatures.
