= Foreign policy of the United States =

According to its 2025 National Security Strategy, the officially stated goals of the foreign policy of the United States of America are to ensure US preeminence in the Western Hemisphere, to "halt and reverse the ongoing damage that foreign actors inflict on the American economy while keeping the Indo-Pacific free and open", to "prevent an adversarial power from dominating the Middle East", and that "U.S. technology and U.S. standard" are preeminent.

Liberalism has been a key component of US foreign policy since its independence from Britain. Since the end of World War II, the United States has had a grand strategy which has been characterized as being oriented around primacy, "deep engagement", and/or liberal hegemony. This strategy entails that the United States maintains military predominance; builds and maintains an extensive network of allies (exemplified by NATO, bilateral alliances and foreign US military bases); integrates other states into US-designed international institutions (such as the IMF, WTO/GATT, and World Bank); and limits the spread of nuclear weapons.

The United States House Committee on Foreign Affairs states as some of its jurisdictional goals: "export controls, including nonproliferation of nuclear technology and nuclear hardware; measures to foster commercial interaction with foreign nations and to safeguard American business abroad; international commodity agreements; international education; protection of American citizens abroad; and expulsion". U.S. foreign policy and foreign aid have been the subject of much debate and criticism, both domestically and abroad.

== Foreign policy development ==
Article Two of the United States Constitution grants power of foreign policy to the president of the United States, including powers to command the military, negotiate treaties, and appoint ambassadors. The Department of State carries out the president's foreign policy. The State Department is usually pulled between the wishes of Congress, and the wishes of the residing president. The Department of Defense carries out the president's military policy. The Central Intelligence Agency is an independent agency responsible for gathering intelligence on foreign activity. Some checks and balances are applied to the president's powers of foreign policy. Treaties negotiated by the president require ratification by the Senate to take force as United States law. The president's ambassadorial nominations also require Senate approval before taking office. Military actions must first be approved by both chambers of Congress.

The Constitution grants Congress the power to approve the president's picks for ambassadors and the power to declare war. The president is commander-in-chief of the United States Armed Forces. He appoints a secretary of state and ambassadors with the advice and consent of the Senate. The secretary acts similarly to a foreign minister, because they are the primary conductor of foreign affairs. While foreign policy has varied slightly from president to president, there have generally been consistently similar goals throughout different administrations.

Map of President's Trump's Board of Peace

Generally speaking there are four schools of thought regarding foreign policy. First is Neo-Isolationists, who believe the United States should maintain a very narrow focus and avoid all involvement in the rest of the world. Second is selective-engagement which avoids all conflicts with other nations, and is semi-restrictive on its foreign policy. Third is cooperative security, which requires more involvement throughout the world, occasionally countering threats to the country. Finally is the idea of primacy which seeks to advance the United States well beyond all other nations of the world, placing it first in all matters.

American foreign policy includes international agreements made with other countries. Treaties are governed by the Treaty Clause of the United States Constitution. This clause dictates that the president negotiates treaties with other countries or political entities, and signs them. For a treaty to be ratified by the provisions of this clause, it must be approved by two-thirds of the United States Senate. Typically treaties are first discussed and voted on by the Senate Committee on Foreign Relations. If approved, the United States exchanges the instruments of ratification with the relevant foreign states. In Missouri v. Holland, the Supreme Court ruled that the power to make treaties under the U.S. Constitution is a power separate from the other enumerated powers of the federal government, and hence the federal government can use treaties to legislate in areas which would otherwise fall within the exclusive authority of the states. Between 1789 and 1990, the Senate approved more than 1,500 treaties, rejected 21 and withdrew 85 without further action. As of 2019, 37 treaties were pending Senate approval.

International agreements, sometimes also collectively referred to as treaties, can also be entered into by other mechanisms, though they have different legal implications than Senate-ratified treaties. The president can unilaterally make executive agreements. Under the Supreme Court decisions United States v. Pink (1942) and Reid v. Covert (1957), these have the force of law only to the degree they were made by exercising a power in the scope of the president's authority.

Congressional-executive agreements are commonly used to enshrine the provisions of an international compact into federal law. Under this procedure, the executive branch negotiates the language, which is then approved by Congress and signed by the President as a regular piece of legislation, only requiring a simple majority of both houses. This procedure has been upheld by federal courts, though some scholars question its constitutionality because it bypasses the explicit Senate ratification procedure spelled out for treaties.

The State Department has taken the position that the Vienna Convention on the Law of Treaties represents established law. Following ratification, the United States incorporates treaty law into the body of U.S. federal law. As a result, Congress can modify or repeal treaties after they are ratified. This can overrule an agreed-upon treaty obligation even if that is seen as a violation of the treaty under international law. Several U.S. court rulings confirmed this understanding, including Supreme Court decisions in Paquete Habana v. the United States (1900), and Reid v. Covert (1957), as well as a lower court ruling in Garcia-Mir v. Meese (1986). As a result of the Reid v. Covert decision, the United States adds a reservation to the text of every treaty that says in effect that the United States intends to abide by the treaty but that if the treaty is found to be in violation of the Constitution, the United States legally is then unable to abide by the treaty since the American signature would be ultra vires.

== Historical overview ==
The main trend regarding the history of U.S. foreign policy since the American Revolution is the shift from non-interventionism before and after World War I, to its growth as a world power and global hegemon during World War II and throughout the Cold War in the 20th century. Since the 19th century, U.S. foreign policy also has been characterized by a shift from the realist school to the idealistic or Wilsonian school of international relations. Over time, other themes, key goals, attitudes, or stances have been variously expressed by presidential 'doctrines'.

=== 18th century ===
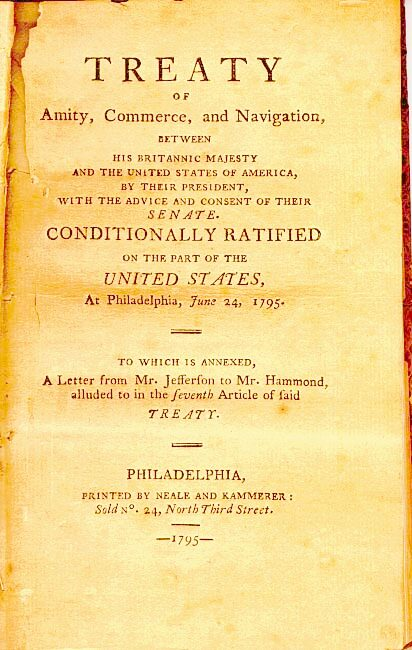
The Jay Treaty of 1795 aligned the U.S. more with Britain and less with France, leading to political polarization at home.

Foreign policy themes were expressed considerably in George Washington's farewell address; these included, among other things, observing good faith and justice towards all nations and cultivating peace and harmony with all, excluding both "inveterate antipathies against particular nations, and passionate attachments for others", "steer[ing] clear of permanent alliances with any portion of the foreign world", and advocating trade with all nations. Foreign policy in the first years of American independence constituted the balancing of relations with Great Britain and France. The Federalist Party supported Washington's foreign policy and sought close ties with Britain, but the Democratic-Republican Party favored France. Under the Federalist government of John Adams, the United States engaged in conflict with France in the Quasi-War, but the rival Jeffersonians feared Britain and favored France in the 1790s, declaring the War of 1812 on Britain. Jeffersonians vigorously opposed a large standing army and any navy until attacks against American shipping by Barbary corsairs spurred the country into developing a navy, resulting in the First Barbary War in 1801.

=== 19th century ===
American foreign policy was mostly peaceful and marked by steady expansion of its foreign trade during the 19th century. As the Jeffersonians took power in the 1800s, they opposed a large standing army and any navy until attacks against American shipping by Barbary corsairs spurred the country into developing a naval force projection capability, resulting in the First Barbary War in 1801. The Louisiana Purchase in 1803 doubled the nation's geographical area. The American policy of neutrality had caused tensions to rise with Britain in the Atlantic and with Native American nations in the frontier. This led to the War of 1812 and helped cement American foreign policy as independent of Europe. After the War of 1812, there were disagreements as to whether the United States should be isolated or be more involved in global activities.

In the 1820s, the Monroe Doctrine was established as the primary foreign policy doctrine of the United States, establishing Latin America as an American sphere of influence and rejecting European colonization in the region. The 1830s and 1840s were marked by increasing conflict with Mexico, exacerbated by the Texas annexation and culminating in the Mexican–American War in 1846. Following the war, the United States claimed much of what is now the Southwestern United States, and the Gadsden Purchase further expanded this territory. Relations with Britain continued to be strained as a result of border conflicts until they were resolved by the Webster–Ashburton Treaty in 1842. The Perry Expedition of 1853 led to Japan establishing relations with the United States.

The Diplomacy of the American Civil War emphasized preventing European involvement in the war. During the Civil War, Spain and France defied the Monroe Doctrine and expanded their colonial influence in the Dominican Republic and Mexico, respectively. The Alaska Purchase was negotiated with Russia in 1867 and the Newlands Resolution annexed Hawaii in 1898. The Spanish–American War took place during 1898, resulting in the United States claiming Guam, Puerto Rico, and the Philippines, and causing Spain to retract claims upon Cuba. Generally speaking the Foreign Policy of the United States during this era was anchored in a policy of wealth building for the nation.

=== 20th century ===
Following the Spanish–American War, the United States entered the 20th century as an emerging great power with colonies in the Caribbean and the Pacific. Under Theodore Roosevelt, the United States adopted the Roosevelt Corollary, which indicated American willingness to use its military strength to end conflicts and wrongdoings in Latin America. Following the independence of Panama, the United States and Panama negotiated the construction of the Panama Canal, during which time the Panama Canal Zone was placed under American jurisdiction. The United States established the Open Door Policy with China during this time as well. The 20th century was marked by two world wars in which Allied powers, along with the United States, defeated their enemies, and through this participation the United States increased its international reputation.

==== World War I and interbellum ====
Entry into World War I was a hotly debated issue in the 1916 presidential election. President Wilson's Fourteen Points was developed from his idealistic Wilsonianism program of spreading democracy and fighting militarism to prevent future wars. It became the basis of the German Armistice (which amounted to a military surrender) and the 1919 Paris Peace Conference. The resulting Treaty of Versailles, due to European allies' punitive and territorial designs, showed insufficient conformity with these points, and the U.S. signed separate treaties with each of its adversaries; due to Senate objections also, the U.S. never joined the League of Nations, which was established as a result of Wilson's initiative. In the 1920s, the United States followed an independent course, and succeeded in a program of naval disarmament, and refunding the German economy. Operating outside the League it became a dominant player in diplomatic affairs. New York became the financial capital of the world, but the Wall Street Crash of 1929 hurled the Western industrialized world into the Great Depression. American trade policy relied on high tariffs under the Republicans, and reciprocal trade agreements under the Democrats, but in any case exports were at very low levels in the 1930s. Post WWI, the United States entered back into isolation from world events. This was largely due to the Great Depression of 1929.

==== World War II ====
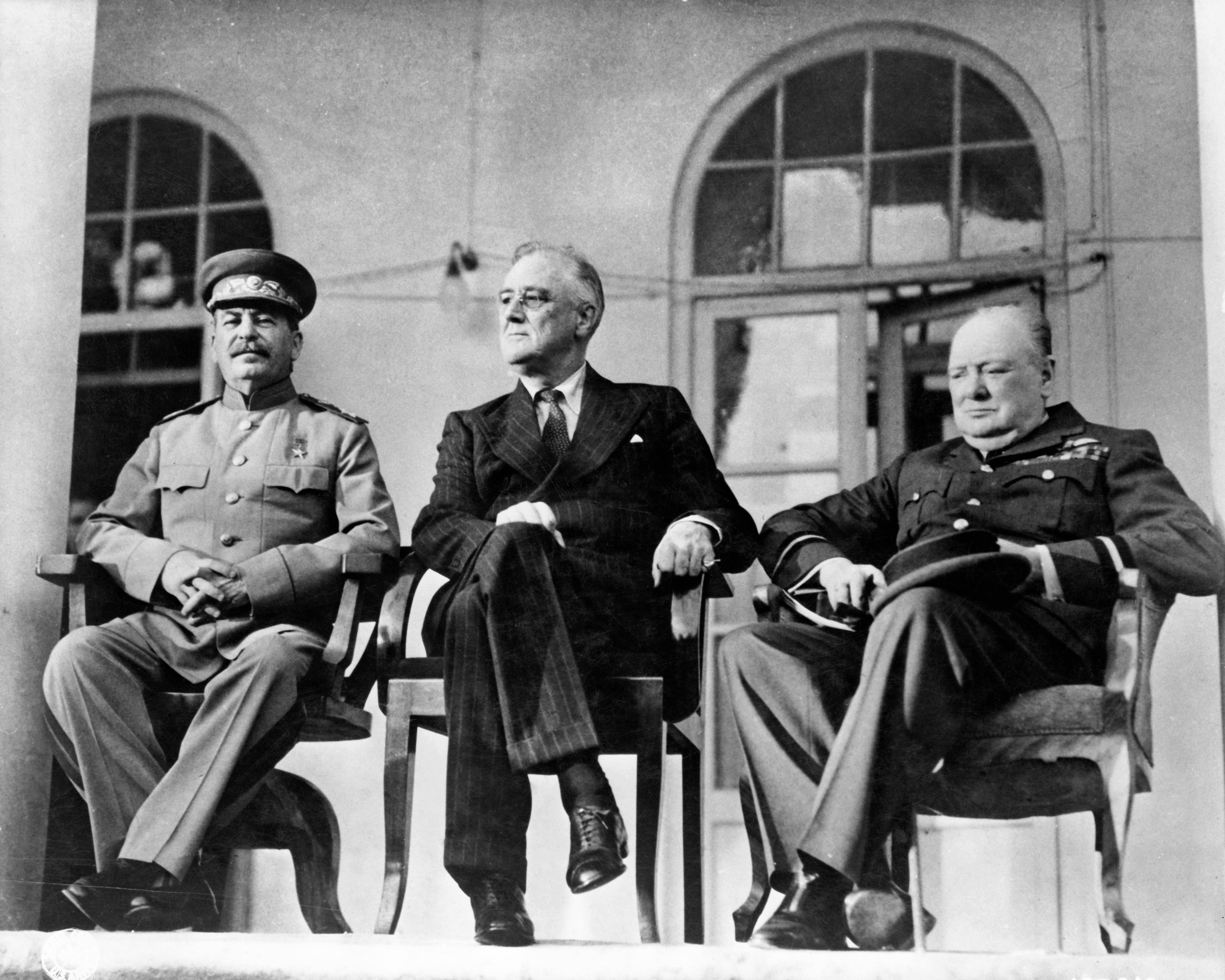
Allies of World War II at the Tehran Conference: Winston Churchill, Franklin D. Roosevelt, and Joseph Stalin

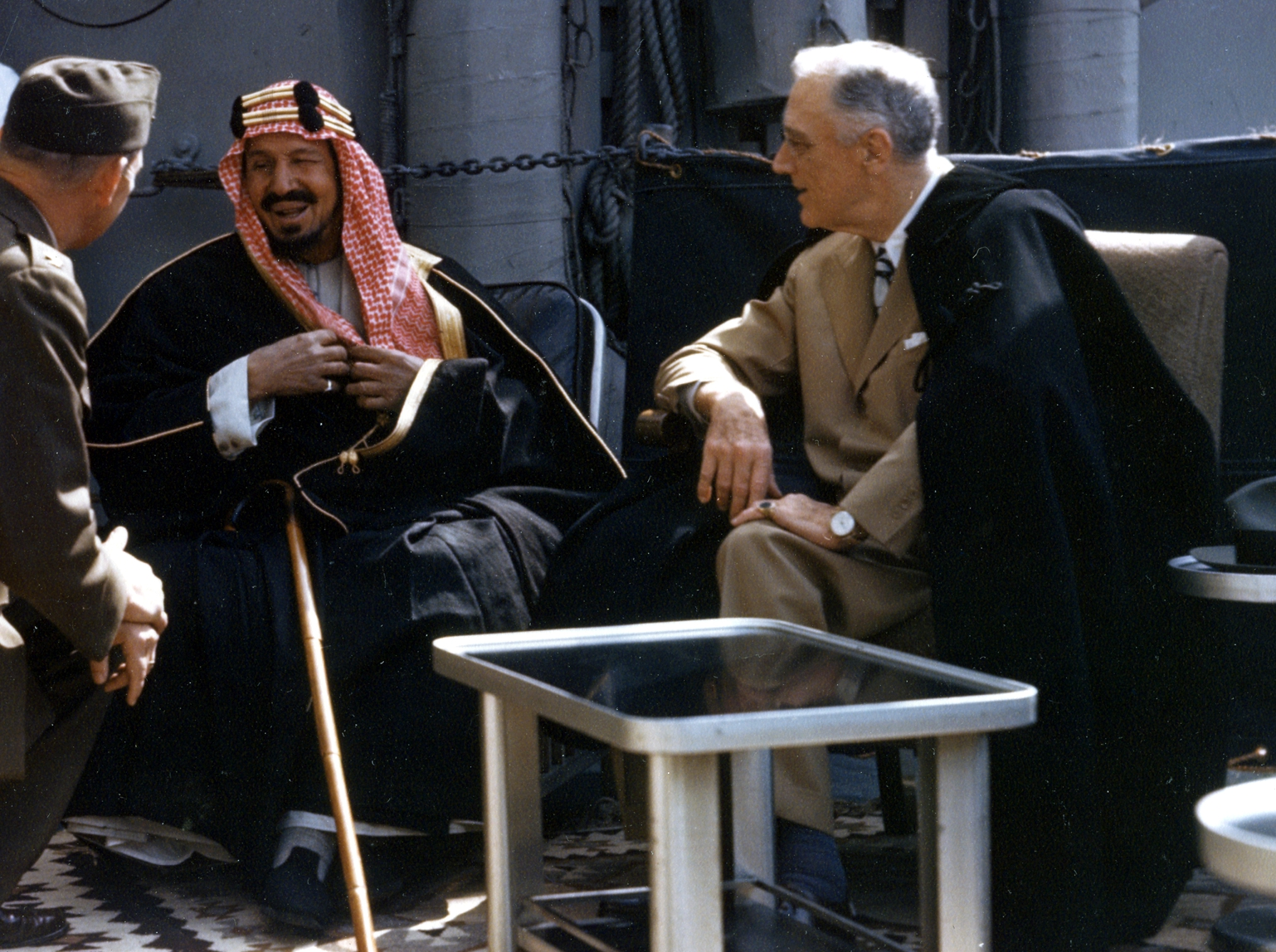
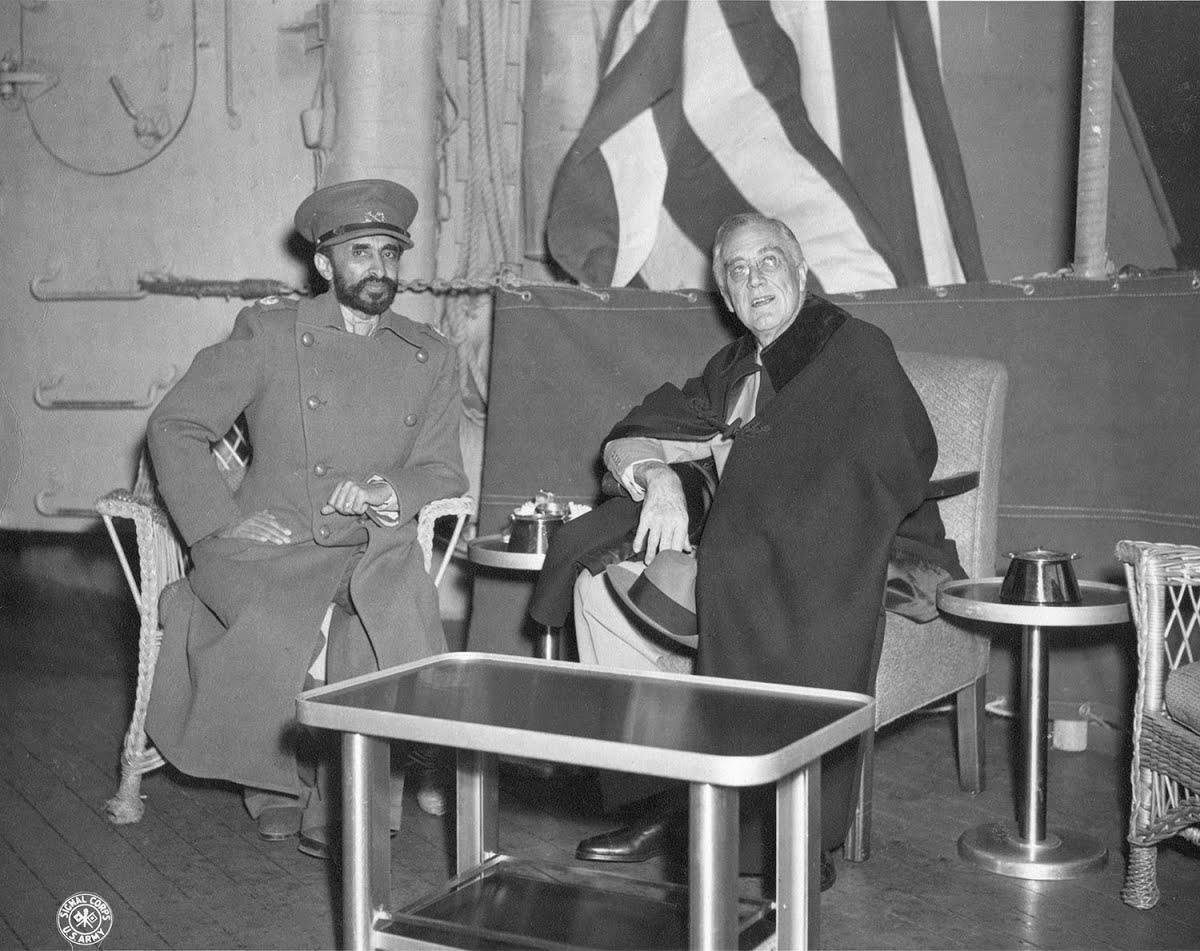
(Top) Both King Abdulaziz and (Bottom) Emperor Haile Selassie I with US President Franklin D. Roosevelt on USS Quincy (CA-71) in Egypt after the Yalta Conference in February 1945

The United States adopted an isolationist foreign policy from 1932 to 1938, but this position was challenged by the outbreak of World War II in 1939. Franklin D. Roosevelt advocated strong support of the allies, establishing the United States as the Arsenal of Democracy by providing military equipment without entering the war. Following the attack on Pearl Harbor, the United States joined the allies as combatants in World War II.

Roosevelt mentioned four fundamental freedoms, which ought to be enjoyed by people "everywhere in the world"; these included the freedom of speech and religion, as well as freedom from want and fear. Roosevelt helped establish terms for a post-war world among potential allies at the Atlantic Conference; specific points were included to correct earlier failures, which became a step toward the United Nations. American policy was to counter Japan, to force out of China, and to prevent attacking the Soviet Union. Japan reacted with an attack on Pearl Harbor in December 1941, and the United States was at war with Japan, Germany, and Italy. Instead of the loans given to allies in World War I, the United States provided Lend-Lease grants of $50,000,000,000. Working closely with Winston Churchill of Britain, and Joseph Stalin of the Soviet Union, Roosevelt sent his forces into the Pacific against Japan, then into North Africa against Italy and Germany, and finally into Europe starting with France and Italy in 1944 against the Germans. The American economy roared forward, doubling industrial production, and building vast quantities of airplanes, ships, tanks, munitions, and, finally, the atomic bomb. The culmination of World War II ended in the defeat of Nazi Germany, and the dropping of the atomic bombs on Hiroshima and Nagasaki. The post World War II era saw the rise of the United States as the global leader, which necessitated an effort by the United States to instill liberal democracy around the world.

==== Cold War ====
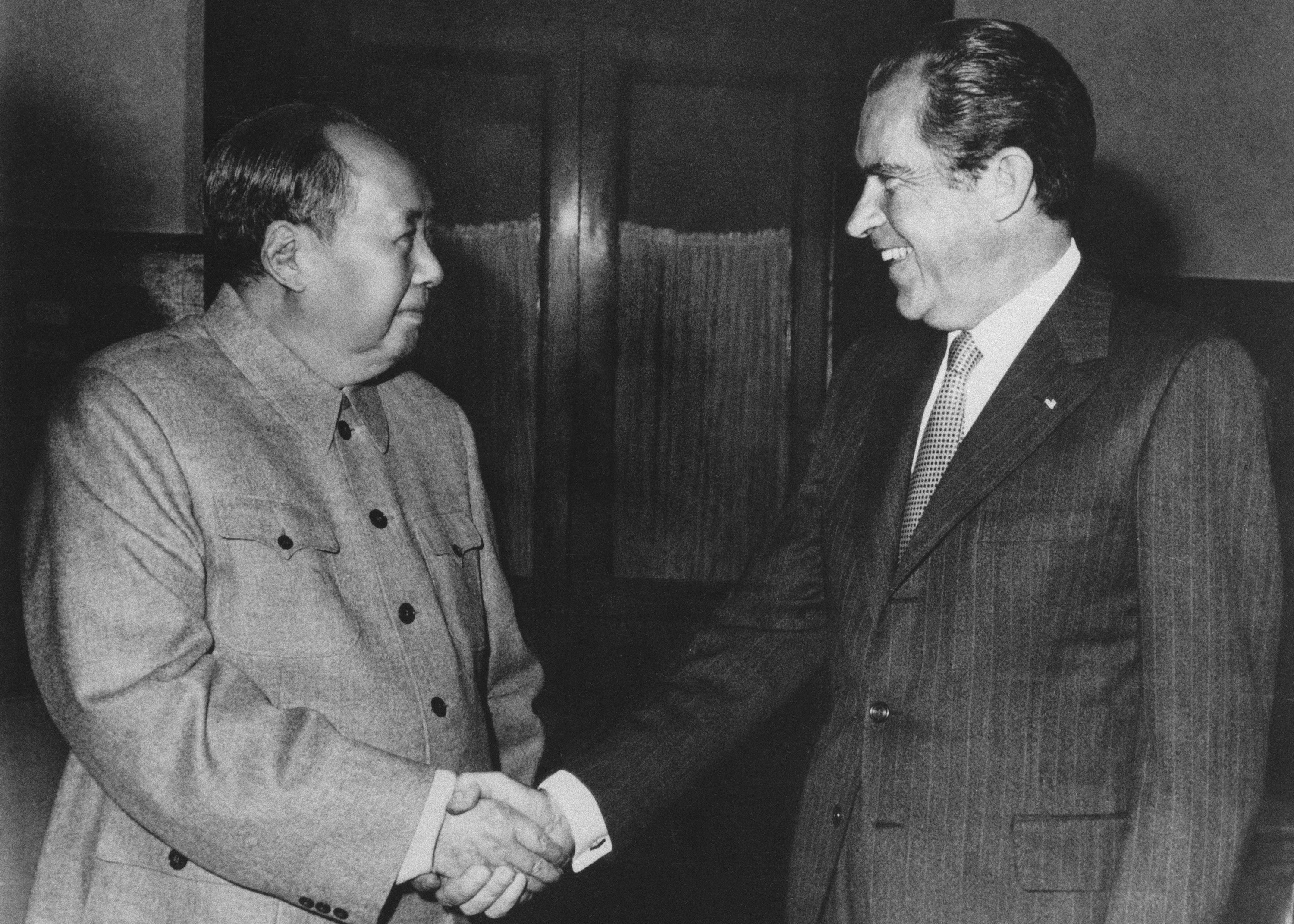
President Richard Nixon went to China to open friendly relations and meet Chinese Communist Party Chairman Mao Zedong in 1972.

After the war, the U.S. rose to become the dominant economic power with broad influence in much of the world, with the key policies of the Marshall Plan and the Truman Doctrine. Almost immediately, two broad camps formed during the Cold War; one side was led by the U.S. and the other by the Soviet Union, but this situation also led to the establishment of the Non-Aligned Movement. This period lasted until almost the end of the 20th century and is thought to be both an ideological and power struggle between the two superpowers. The United States extended its influence in the years after World War II, enacting the Marshall Plan to support the reconstruction process in European countries and seeking to combat Communism through containment. This strategy of containment resulted in the Korean War and the Vietnam War. The Vietnam War in particular was highly controversial, and its perceived failures reduced popularity for foreign intervention in the United States. The invasion of Afghanistan by the Soviet Union contributed directly to fueling tensions between the United States and the Soviet Union. This began with President Carter announcing the United States interests in maintaining the status quo within the Persian Gulf region, resulting in the Carter Doctrine. The Regan administration escalated the tensions by supporting freedom fighters around the world, most notably in Afghanistan during the Soviet invasion. The Soviet Union and the United States did not engage in direct conflict, but rather supported small proxies that opposed the other. In 1991, the Soviet Union dissolved into separate nations, and the Cold War formally ended as the United States gave separate diplomatic recognition to the Russian Federation and other former Soviet states.

In domestic politics, foreign policy was not usually a central issue. In 1945–1970, the Democratic Party took a strong anti-Communist line and supported wars in Korea and Vietnam. Then the party split with a strong, "dovish", pacifist element (typified by 1972 presidential candidate George McGovern). Many "hawks", advocates for war, joined the neoconservative movement and started supporting the Republicans—especially Reagan—based on foreign policy. Meanwhile, down to 1952 the Republican Party was split between an isolationist wing, based in the Midwest and led by Senator Robert A. Taft, and an internationalist wing based in the East and led by Dwight D. Eisenhower. Eisenhower defeated Taft for the 1952 nomination largely on foreign policy grounds. Since then the Republicans have been characterized by American nationalism, strong opposition to Communism, and strong support for Israel.

=== 21st century ===
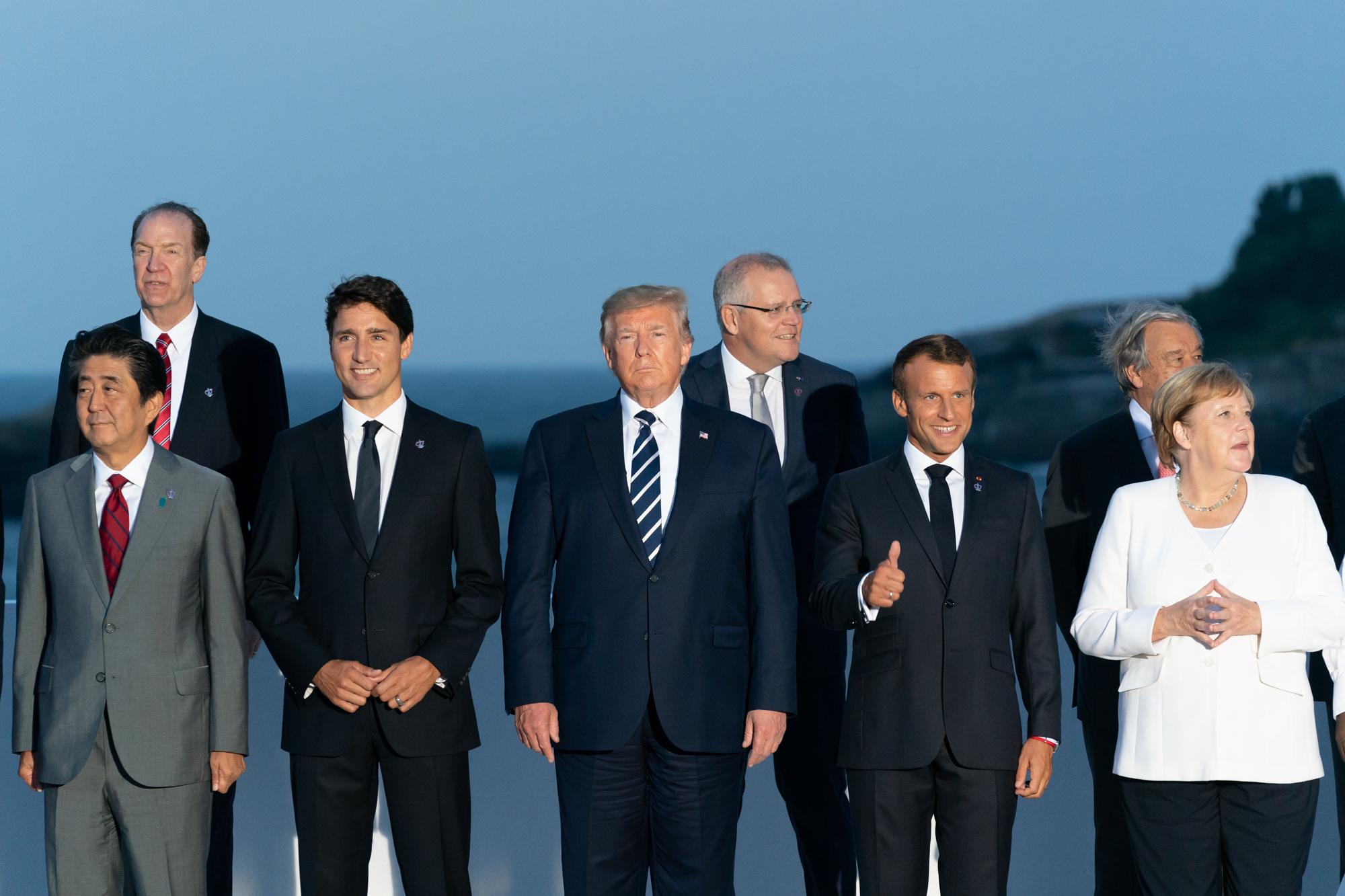
President Donald Trump and his Western allies from G7 and NATO

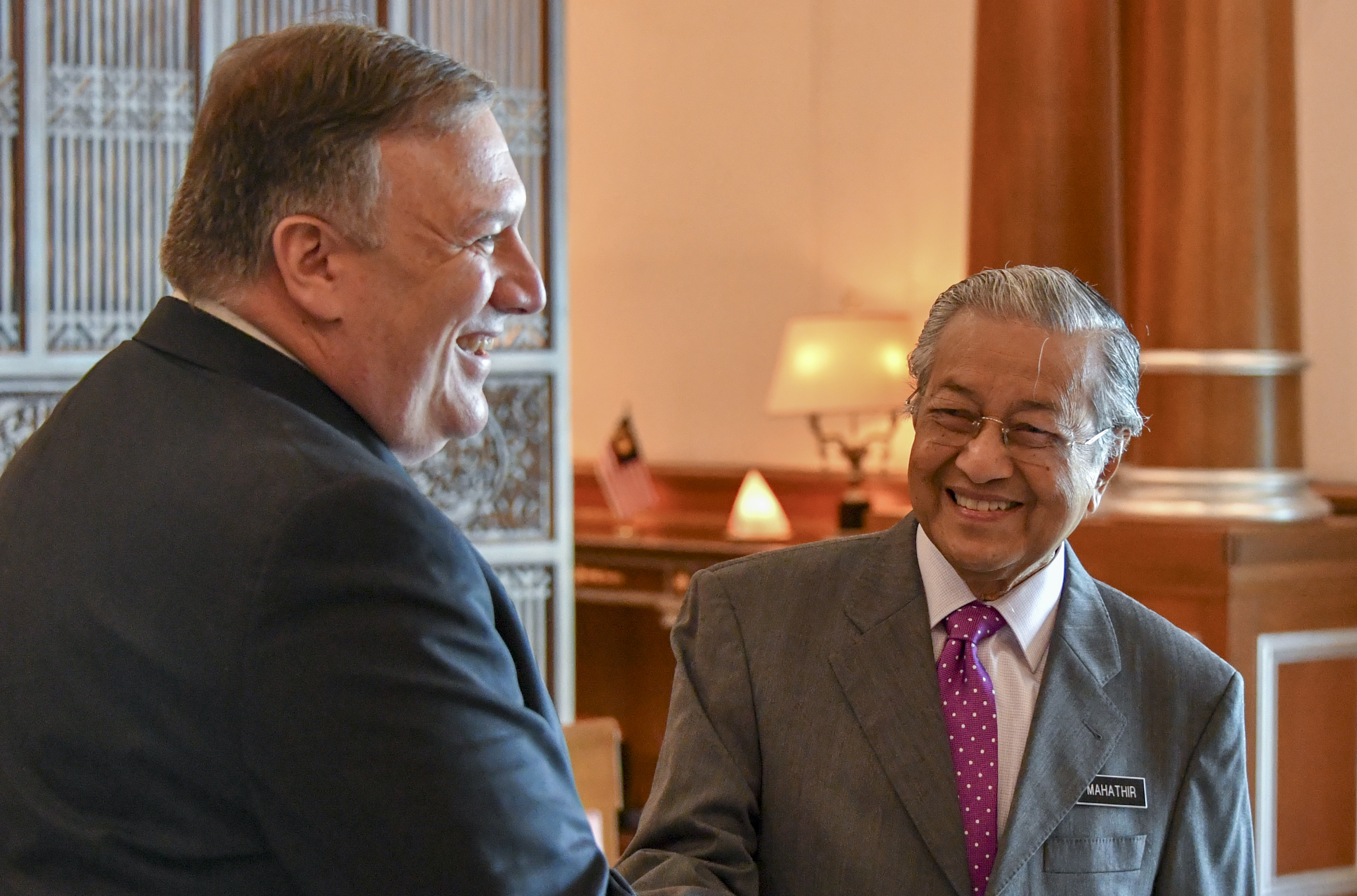
Malaysian Prime Minister Mahathir Mohamad meets with US Secretary of State Mike Pompeo in 2018.

Following the end of the Cold War, the United States entered the 21st century as the sole superpower, though this status has been challenged by China, India, Russia, and the European Union. Substantial problems remain, such as climate change, nuclear proliferation, and the specter of international terrorism.

The September 11 attacks in 2001 caused a policy shift, in which America declared a "war on terror". The United States invaded Afghanistan in 2001 and invaded Iraq in 2003, emphasizing nation-building and the neutralization of terrorist threats in the Middle East. During the war on terror, the United States significantly expanded its military and intelligence capacities while also pursuing economic methods of targeting opposing governments. After a phased withdrawal from Iraq, In 2014, the Islamic State emerged as a major hostile power in the Middle East, and the United States led a military intervention in Iraq and Syria to combat it. The extended nature of American involvement in Iraq and Afghanistan has resulted in support for isolationism and reduced involvement in foreign conflicts.

In 2011, the United States led a NATO intervention in Libya. In 2013, disclosures of American surveillance programs revealed that United States intelligence policy included extensive global surveillance activities against foreign governments and citizens.

In 2017, diplomats from other countries developed new tactics to engage with President Donald Trump's brand of American nationalism. Peter Baker of The New York Times reported on the eve of his first foreign trip as president that the global diplomatic community had devised a strategy of keeping interactions brief, complimenting him, and giving him something he can consider a victory. Before the Trump presidency, foreign policy in the U.S. was the result of bipartisan consensus on an agenda of strengthening its position as the number one power. That consensus has since fractured, with Republican and Democratic politicians increasingly calling for a more restrained approach. Foreign policy under the Trump administration involved heightened tensions with Iran, a trade war through increased tariffs, and a reduced role in international organizations.

Advancing a "Free and Open Indo-Pacific" has become the core of the U.S. national security strategy and has been embraced by both Democratic and Republican administrations. The United States ended its wars in the Greater Middle East with the withdrawal from Afghanistan in 2021. Unlike the Trump administration, which is more concerned with containing China's influence, foreign policy of the Biden-Harris administration shifted to an increased focus on Russia following the attempted Russian interference in the 2016 United States elections and developments in the Russo-Ukrainian War. With the rise of Russia and China as co-superpowers, the United States has had to shift its relations to more cooperation rather than coercion, with Russia and China pursuing a more self serving global system.

In a July 2025 meeting with High Representative of the Union for Foreign Affairs and Security Policy Kaja Kallas, Director of the Chinese Communist Party's Central Foreign Affairs Commission Office Wang Yi stated that China did not want to see Russia's loss in Ukraine. The diplomats reported, China fears the United States could focus more on Asia, once the conflict in Europe is over.

The Trump administration boycotted the November 2025 summit with G20 leaders, which took place in South Africa due to the on-going persecution of white citizens.

In the mid-2020s, discussions about U.S. foreign policy increasingly centered on whether Washington was reassessing its global priorities in response to shifting geopolitical dynamics. Analysts and international media noted potential changes in U.S. foreign policy, particularly regarding Iran. Although the 2025–2026 U.S. National Security Strategy suggested a reduced overall focus on the Middle East, reports indicated that Iran remained a key strategic concern. Think tanks and policy analysts highlighted unresolved issues such as Iran's nuclear program, its regional influence, and ongoing diplomatic tensions. At the same time, media coverage of U.S.–Israel security discussions related to Iran underscored Tehran's continued role in shaping Washington's foreign policy considerations. In the mid-2020s, discussions about U.S. foreign policy increasingly centered on whether Washington was reassessing its global priorities in response to shifting geopolitical dynamics. Analysts and international media noted potential changes in U.S. foreign policy, particularly regarding Iran. Although the 2025–2026 U.S. National Security Strategy suggested a reduced overall focus on the Middle East, reports indicated that Iran remained a key strategic concern. Think tanks and policy analysts highlighted unresolved issues such as Iran's nuclear program, its regional influence, and ongoing diplomatic tensions. At the same time, media coverage of U.S.–Israel security discussions related to Iran underscored Tehran's continued role in shaping Washington's foreign policy considerations.

In 2025–26, the U.S. triggered the Greenland crisis, while Trump declared he no longer felt "an obligation to think purely of Peace" in his foreign policy after his failure to win the 2025 Nobel Peace Prize.

The foreign policy of the second Trump administration has been described as imperialist, expansionist, and interventionist in respect to the Americas and Middle East, but also isolationist in respect to Europe and Africa. Trump has used the expansive version of the Monroe Doctrine, that Donald Trump himself called the "Donroe Doctrine". His foreign policy has been compared to the policy of former president William McKinley. Trump's deputy chief of staff, Stephen Miller, explained their policy saying: "We're a superpower. And under President Trump, we are going to conduct ourselves as a superpower."

== Diplomatic policy ==
The diplomatic policy of the United States is created by the president and carried out by the Department of State. The department's stated mission is to "protect and promote U.S. security, prosperity, and democratic values and shape an international environment in which all Americans can thrive." Its objectives during the 2022-2026 period include renewing U.S. leadership, promoting global prosperity, strengthening democratic institutions, revitalizing the diplomatic workforce and institutions, and serving U.S. citizens abroad. As of 2022, the United States has bilateral relations with all but four United Nations members.

The United States government historically emphasized human rights in foreign policy. Annual reports produced by the Department of State, such as "Advancing Freedom and Democracy" and the "Country Reports on Human Rights Practices", track the status of human rights around the world, though contents of the reports were significantly scaled back under the second Trump administration. The National Endowment for Democracy provides financial aid to promote democracy internationally.

=== International agreements ===
The United States is party to thousands of international agreements with other countries, territories, and international organizations. These include arms control agreements, human rights treaties, environmental protocols, and free trade agreements. Under the Compact of Free Association, the United States also maintains a relationship of free association with the countries of Micronesia, the Marshall Islands, and Palau, grants the United States military access to the countries in exchange for military protection, foreign aid, and access domestic American agencies.

The United States is a member of many international organizations. It is a founding member of the United Nations and holds a permanent seat on the United Nations Security Council. The United States is also a member of other global organizations, including the World Trade Organization. Regional organizations in which the United States is a member include NATO, Organization of American States, the Organization for Security and Co-operation in Europe, the United States–Mexico–Canada Agreement, and the Asia-Pacific Economic Cooperation. As the largest economy in the world, the United States is also a member of organizations for the most developed nations, including the OECD, the Group of Seven, and the G20.

==== Non-participation in multi-lateral agreements ====
The United States notably does not participate in various international agreements adhered to by almost all other industrialized countries, by almost all the countries of the Americas, or by almost all other countries in the world. With a large population and economy, on a practical level this can undermine the effect of certain agreements, or give other countries a precedent to cite for non-participation in various agreements.

In some cases the arguments against participation include that the United States should maximize its sovereignty and freedom of action, or that ratification would create a basis for lawsuits that would treat American citizens unfairly. In other cases, the debate became involved in domestic political issues, such as gun control, climate change, and the death penalty.

Examples include:

- Versailles Treaty and the League of Nations covenant (in force 1920–45, signed but not ratified)
- International Covenant on Civil and Political Rights (took effect in 1976, ratified with substantial reservations)
- International Covenant on Economic, Social and Cultural Rights (took effect in 1976, signed but not ratified)
- American Convention on Human Rights (took effect in 1978)
- Convention on the Elimination of All Forms of Discrimination against Women (took effect in 1981, signed but not ratified)
- Convention on the Rights of the Child (took effect in 1990, signed but not ratified)
- United Nations Convention on the Law of the Sea (took effect in 1994)
- Comprehensive Nuclear-Test-Ban Treaty (signed in 1996 but never ratified and never took effect)
- Mine Ban Treaty (took effect in 1999)
- International Criminal Court (took effect in 2002)
- Kyoto Protocol (in force 2005–12, signed but not ratified)
- Optional Protocol to the Convention against Torture (took effect in 2006)
- Convention on the Rights of Persons with Disabilities (took effect in 2008, signed but not ratified)
- Convention on Cluster Munitions (took effect in 2010)
- International Convention for the Protection of All Persons from Enforced Disappearance (took effect in 2010)
- Arms Trade Treaty (took effect in 2014)
- Other human rights treaties
- Joint Comprehensive Plan of Action (took effect in 2016 as part of the United Nations Security Council Resolution 2231. Signed by the U.S., France, Germany, European Union, UK, Russia, China and Iran, but abandoned by the U.S. in 2018)

=== Foreign aid ===
Foreign assistance has been a core component of the State Department's international affairs budget, and aid is considered an essential instrument of U.S. foreign policy. There are four major categories of non-military foreign assistance: bilateral development aid, economic assistance supporting U.S. political and security goals, humanitarian aid, and multilateral economic contributions (for example, contributions to the World Bank and International Monetary Fund). In absolute dollar terms, the United States government is the largest international aid donor. The United States Agency for International Development (USAID) historically managed the bulk of bilateral economic assistance. Foreign aid was significantly cut back during the second Trump administration, which effectively closed USAID, transferring the remaining programs to the Treasury Department, which handles most multilateral aid. Foreign aid has been highly partisan issue in the United States, with liberals, on average, supporting foreign aid much more than conservatives do.

The United States first began distributing regular foreign aid in the aftermath of World War II and the onset of the Cold War. Foreign aid has been used to foster closer relations with foreign nations, strengthen countries that could potentially become future allies and trading partners, and provide assistance for people of countries most in need. American foreign aid contributed to the Green Revolution in the 1960s and the democratization of Taiwan and Colombia. Since the 1970s, issues of human rights have become increasingly important in American foreign policy, and several acts of Congress served to restrict foreign aid from governments that "engage in a consistent pattern of gross violations of internationally recognized human rights". In 2011, President Obama instructed agencies to consider LGBT rights when issuing financial aid to foreign countries. In the 2019 fiscal year, the United States spent $39.2 billion in foreign aid, constituting less than one percent of the federal budget.

=== War on drugs ===
United States foreign policy is influenced by the efforts of the U.S. government to control imports of illicit drugs, including cocaine, heroin, methamphetamine, and cannabis. This is especially true in Latin America, a focus for the U.S. war on drugs. These foreign policy efforts date back to at least the 1900s, when the U.S. banned the importation of non-medical opium and participated in the 1909 International Opium Commission, one of the first international drug conferences.

Over a century later, the Foreign Relations Authorization Act requires the President to identify the major drug transit or major illicit drug-producing countries. In September 2005, the following countries were identified: Bahamas, Bolivia, Brazil, Burma, Colombia, Dominican Republic, Ecuador, Guatemala, Haiti, India, Jamaica, Laos, Mexico, Nigeria, Pakistan, Panama, Paraguay, Peru and Venezuela. Two of these, Burma and Venezuela are countries that the U.S. considers to have failed to adhere to their obligations under international counternarcotics agreements during the previous 12 months. Notably absent from the 2005 list were Afghanistan, the People's Republic of China and Vietnam; Canada was also omitted in spite of evidence that criminal groups there are increasingly involved in the production of MDMA destined for the United States and that large-scale cross-border trafficking of Canadian-grown cannabis continues. The U.S. believes that the Netherlands are successfully countering the production and flow of MDMA to the U.S.

In 2011, overdose deaths in the U.S. were on a decline mostly due to interdiction efforts and international cooperation to reduce the production of illicit drugs. Since about 2014, a reversal of this trend could be clearly seen as legal semi-synthetic opioids and cocaine stimulants were replaced by the fully synthetic fentanyl and methamphetamine. By 2022, overdose deaths caused by illicit fentanyl led to the worst drug crisis the U.S. has ever experienced in its history, with 1,500 people dying every week of overdose-related cases. By 2022, deaths caused by fentanyl significantly reduced the life expectancy in the U.S. and were also seen as a major drag on the U.S. economy. Despite efforts to control the trade of chemicals used in the synthesis of fentanyl, the tide of fentanyl-related deaths continues to be a major threat to U.S. national security.

=== Regional diplomacy ===
==== Africa ====
American involvement with Africa has historically been limited. During the war on terror, the United States increased its activities in Africa to fight terrorism in conjunction with African countries as well as to support democracy in Africa through the Millennium Challenge Corporation. Africa has also been the subject of competition between American and Chinese investment strategies. In 2007 the U.S. was sub-Saharan Africa's largest single export market accounting for 28% of exports (second in total to the EU at 31%). 81% of U.S. imports from this region were petroleum products.

==== Asia ====
America's relations with Asia have tended to be based on a "hub and spoke" model instead of multilateral relations, using a series of bilateral relationships where states coordinate with the United States instead of through a unified bloc. On May 30, 2009, at the Shangri-La Dialogue, Defense Secretary Robert M. Gates urged the nations of Asia to build on this hub and spoke model as they established and grew multilateral institutions such as ASEAN, APEC and the ad hoc arrangements in the area. In 2011, Gates said the United States must serve as the "indispensable nation", for building multilateral cooperation.

==== Canada ====
Canada has historically been a close ally to the United States, and their foreign policies often work in conjunction. The armed forces of Canada and the United States have a high level of interoperability, and domestic air force operations have been fully integrated between the two countries through NORAD. Almost all of Canada's energy exports go to the United States, making it the largest foreign source of U.S. energy imports; Canada is consistently among the top sources for U.S. oil imports, and it is the largest source of U.S. natural gas and electricity imports. Trade between the United States and Canada as well as Mexico is facilitated through the USMCA.

==== Europe ====
The United States has close ties with the European Union, and it is a member of NATO along with several European countries. The United States has close relations with most countries of Europe. Much of American foreign policy has involved combating the Soviet Union in the 20th century and Russia in the 21st century.

==== Latin America ====
The Monroe Doctrine has historically made up the foreign policy of the United States in regard to Latin America. Under this policy, the United States would consider Latin America to be under its sphere of influence and defend Latin American countries from European hostilities. The United States was heavily involved in the politics of Panama during the early 20th century in order to construct the Panama Canal. Cuba was an ally of the United States following its independence, but it was identified as a major national security threat following the Cuban Revolution; Cuba–United States relations remain poor.

==== Middle East ====
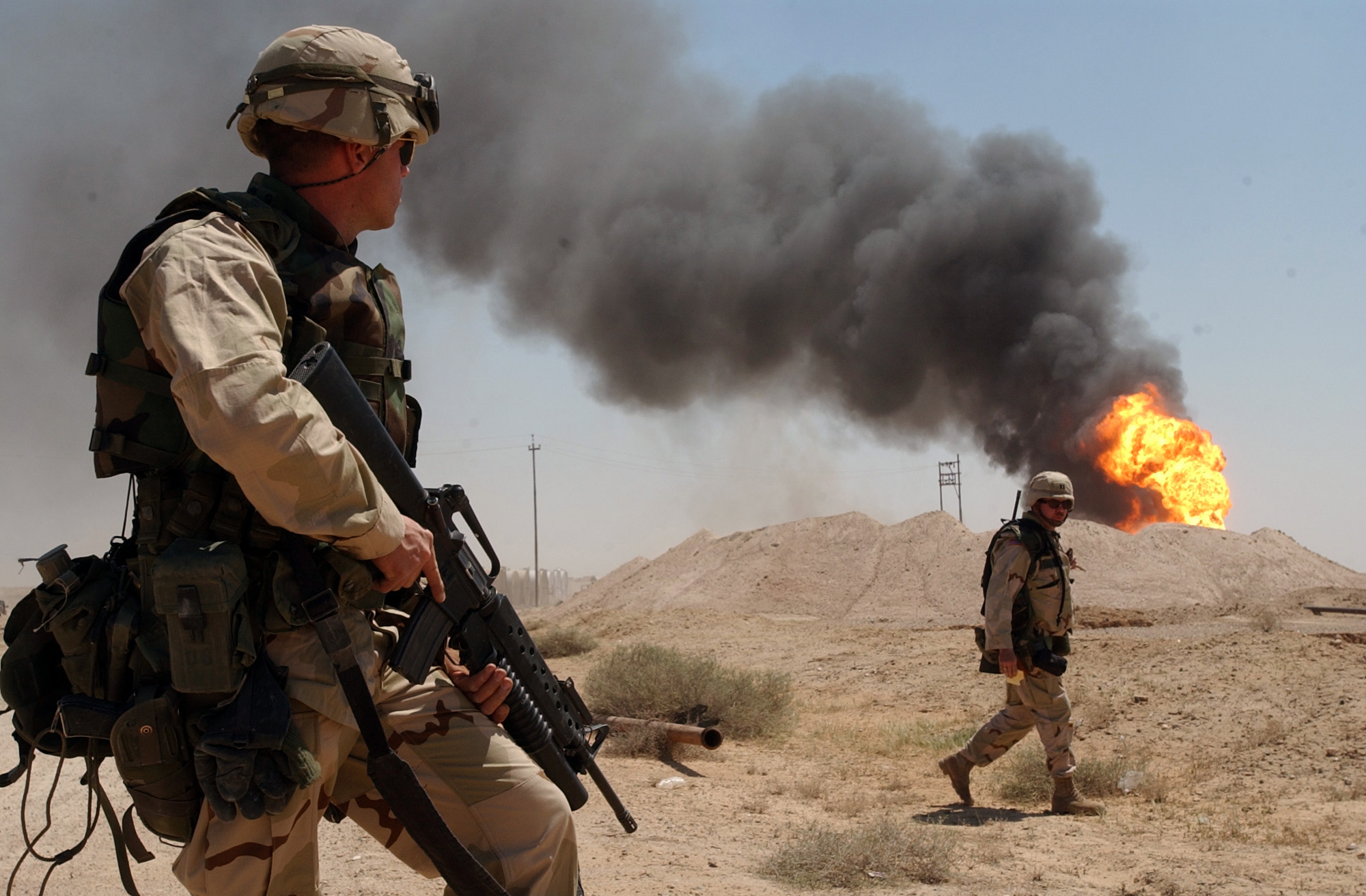
A U.S. soldier stands guard duty near a burning oil well in the Rumaila oil field, Iraq, April 2003.

The Middle East region was first proclaimed to be of national interest to the United States during World War II, and relations were secured with Saudi Arabia to secure additional oil supplies. The Middle East continued to be regarded as an area of vital importance to the United States during the Cold War, and American containment policy emphasized preventing Soviet influence from taking hold in the Middle East. The Truman, Eisenhower, and Nixon Doctrines all played roles in the formulation of the Carter Doctrine, which stated that the United States would use military force if necessary to defend its national interests in the Persian Gulf region. Carter's successor, President Ronald Reagan, extended the policy in October 1981 with the Reagan Doctrine, which proclaimed that the United States would intervene to protect Saudi Arabia, whose security was threatened after the outbreak of the Iran–Iraq War. During the so-called war on terror, the United States increased its involvement in the region; some analysts have argued that the implementation of the Carter Doctrine and the Reagan Doctrine also played a role in the outbreak of the 2003 Iraq War.

Two-thirds of the world's proven oil reserves are estimated to be found in the Persian Gulf, and the United States imports oil from several Middle Eastern countries. While its imports have exceeded domestic production since the early 1990s, new hydraulic fracturing techniques and discovery of shale oil deposits in Canada and the American Dakotas offer the potential for increased energy independence from oil exporting countries such as OPEC.

==== Oceania ====
Australia and New Zealand are close allies of the United States. Together, the three countries compose the ANZUS collective security agreement. The United States and the United Kingdom also have a separate agreement, AUKUS, with Australia. After it captured the islands from Japan during World War II, the United States administered the Trust Territory of the Pacific Islands from 1947 to 1986 (1994 for Palau). The Northern Mariana Islands became a U.S. territory (part of the United States), while Federated States of Micronesia, the Marshall Islands, and Palau became independent countries. Each has signed a Compact of Free Association that gives the United States exclusive military access in return for U.S. defense protection and conduct of military foreign affairs (except the declaration of war) and a few billion dollars of aid. These agreements also generally allow citizens of these countries to live and work in the United States with their spouses (and vice versa), and provide for largely free trade. The federal government also grants access to services from domestic agencies, including the Federal Emergency Management Agency, National Weather Service, the United States Postal Service, the Federal Aviation Administration, the Federal Communications Commission, and U.S. representation to the International Frequency Registration Board of the International Telecommunication Union.

== Defense policy ==
Defense treaty allies of the United States

Defense policy of the United States is established by the president under the role of commander-in-chief, and it is carried out by the Department of Defense and the Department of Homeland Security. As of 2022, the stated objective of the Department of Defense is to deter attacks against the United States and its allies in order to protect the American people, expand America's prosperity, and defend democratic values. The department recognizes China as the greatest foreign threat to the United States, with Russia, North Korea, Iran, and violent extremist organizations recognized as other major foreign threats. Most American troops stationed in foreign countries operate in non-combat roles. As of 2021, about 173,000 troops are deployed in 159 countries. Japan, Germany, and South Korea are host to the largest numbers of American troops due to continued military cooperation following World War II and the Korean War. The United States has not been involved in a major war since the conclusion of the War in Afghanistan in 2021, though American forces continue to operate against terrorist groups in the Middle East and Africa through the Authorization for Use of Military Force of 2001. The United States also provides billions of dollars of military aid to allied countries each year.

The Constitution of the United States requires that Congress authorize any military conflict initiated by the president. This has been carried out through formal declarations of war, Congressional authorizations without formal declaration, and through United Nations Security Council Resolutions that are legally recognized by Congress. The War Powers Resolution of 1973 limited the ability of the president to use the military without Congressional authorization. Prior to 2001, 125 instances of American presidents using military force without Congressional authorization had been identified. Since 2001, the Authorization for Use of Military Force of 2001 (AUMF) has granted the president the power to engage in military conflict with any country, organization, or person that was involved in carrying out the September 11 attacks. American presidents have since interpreted the AUMF to authorize military campaigns against terrorist groups associated with al-Qaeda in several countries.

=== Alliances and partnerships ===
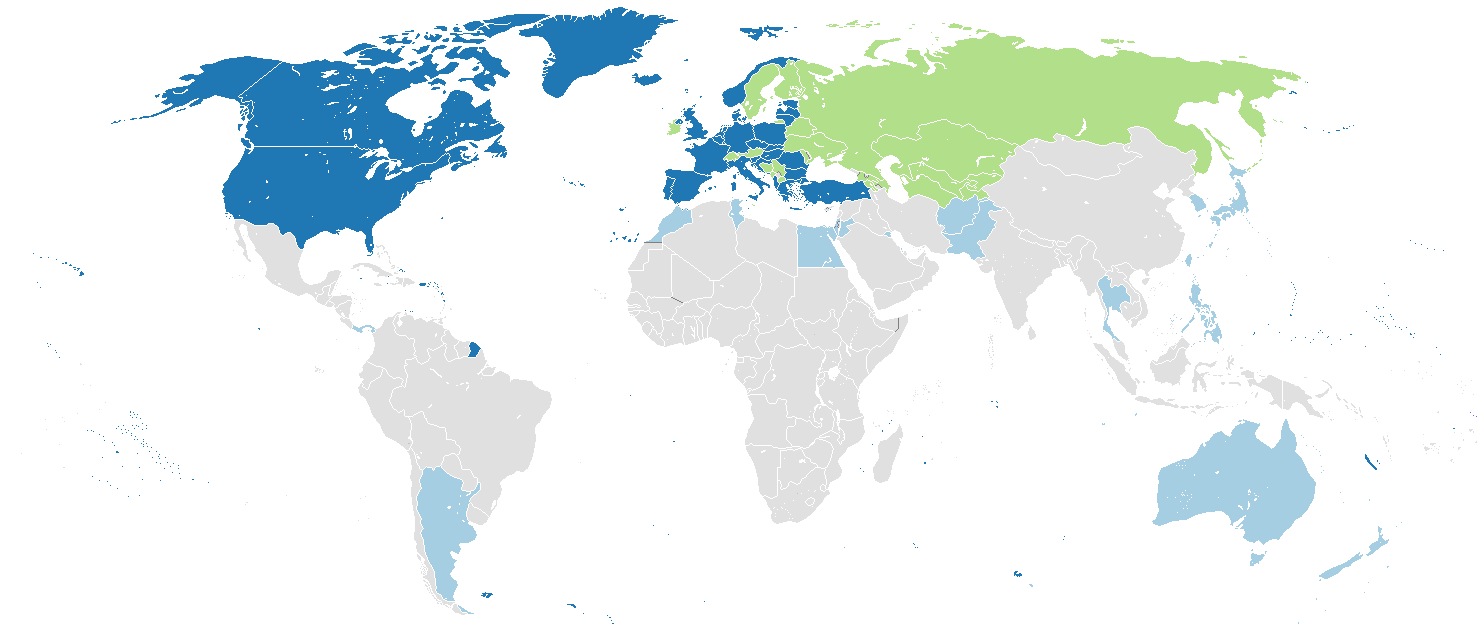
A map of allies of the United States NATO member states, including their colonies and overseas possessions Major non-NATO allies Signatories of Partnership for Peace with NATO

Countries with U.S. military bases (excluding the U.S. Coast Guard)

The Department of Defense considers cooperation with American allies and partners to be "critical" to achieving American defense objectives. The department makes a distinction between alliances, which are formal military agreements between countries through a treaty, and strategic partnerships, which are military cooperation agreements that aren't bound by specific terms. The United States military works in cooperation with many national governments, and the United States has approximately 750 military bases in at least 80 different countries. In addition to military agreements, the United States is a member of multiple international disarmament organizations, including the International Atomic Energy Agency and the Organisation for the Prohibition of Chemical Weapons.

The United States is a founding member of NATO, an alliance of 29 North American and European nations formed to defend Western Europe against the Soviet Union during the Cold War. Under the NATO charter, the United States legally recognizes any attack on a NATO member as an attack on all NATO members. The United States is also a founding member of the Inter-American Treaty of Reciprocal Assistance, an alliance of 19 North and South American nations. The United States is one of the three members of ANZUS, along with Australia and New Zealand, and it also has military alliances with Japan, South Korea, the Philippines, and Thailand. Under the Compact of Free Association, the United States is responsible for the defense of Micronesia, the Marshall Islands, and Palau. The United States has also designated several countries as major non-NATO allies. These are countries that are not members of NATO but are granted certain privileges in regard to defense trade and security cooperation, including eligibility for certain trade deals and research collaboration. The president is empowered to designate additional foreign countries as major non-NATO allies.

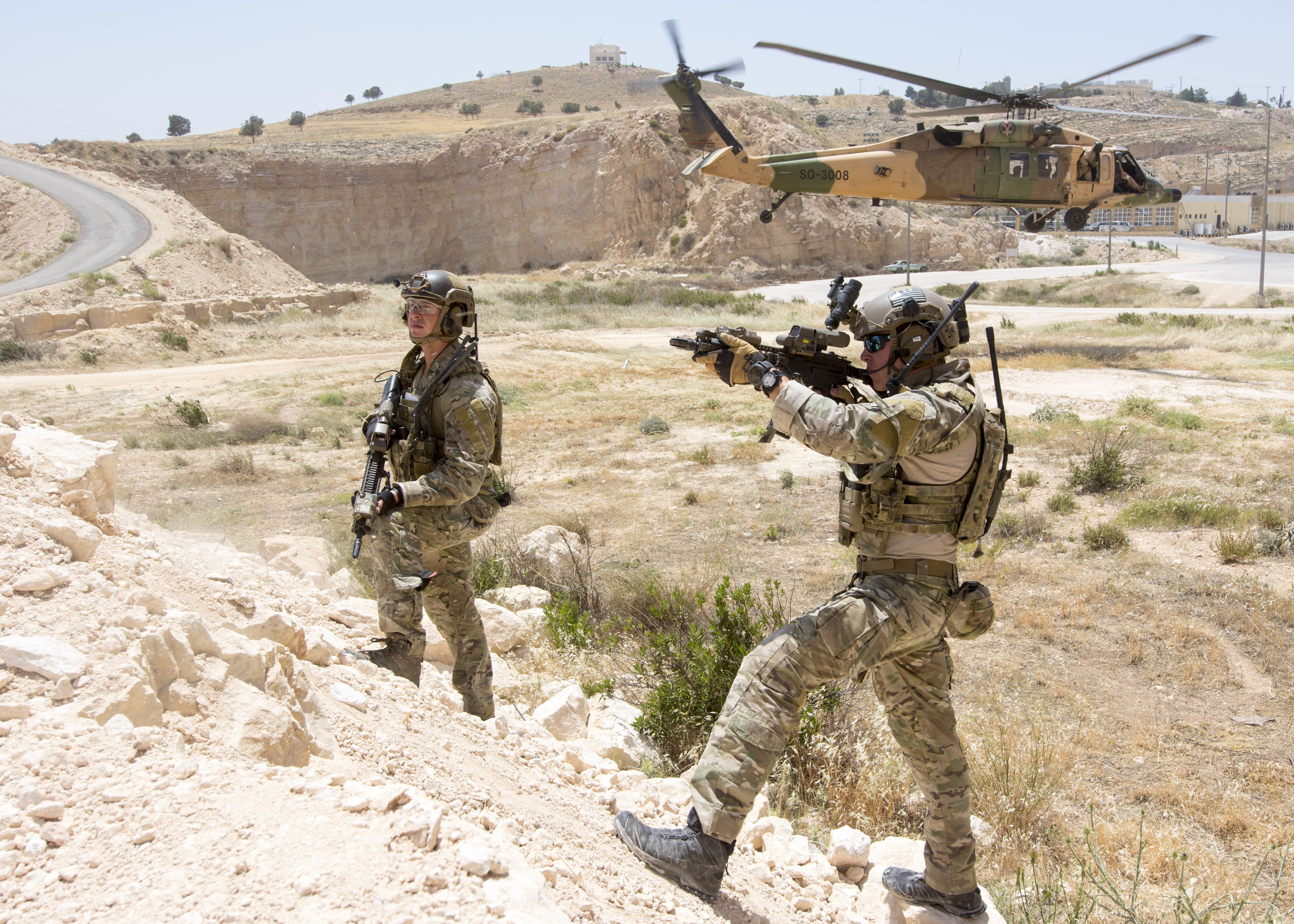
U.S. Air Force Special Tactics Commandos training with Jordanian special operations forces

Since it became a superpower in the mid-20th century, the United States has primarily carried out defense operations by leading and participating in multilateral coalitions. These coalitions may be constructed around existing defensive alliances, such as NATO, or through separate coalitions constructed through diplomatic negotiations and acting in a common interest. The United States has not engaged in unilateral military action since the invasion of Panama in 1989. United States military action may take place in accordance with or in opposition to the wishes of the United Nations. The United States has opposed the expansion of United Nations peacekeeping beyond its previous scope, instead supporting the use of multilateral coalitions in hostile countries and territories.

=== Military aid ===
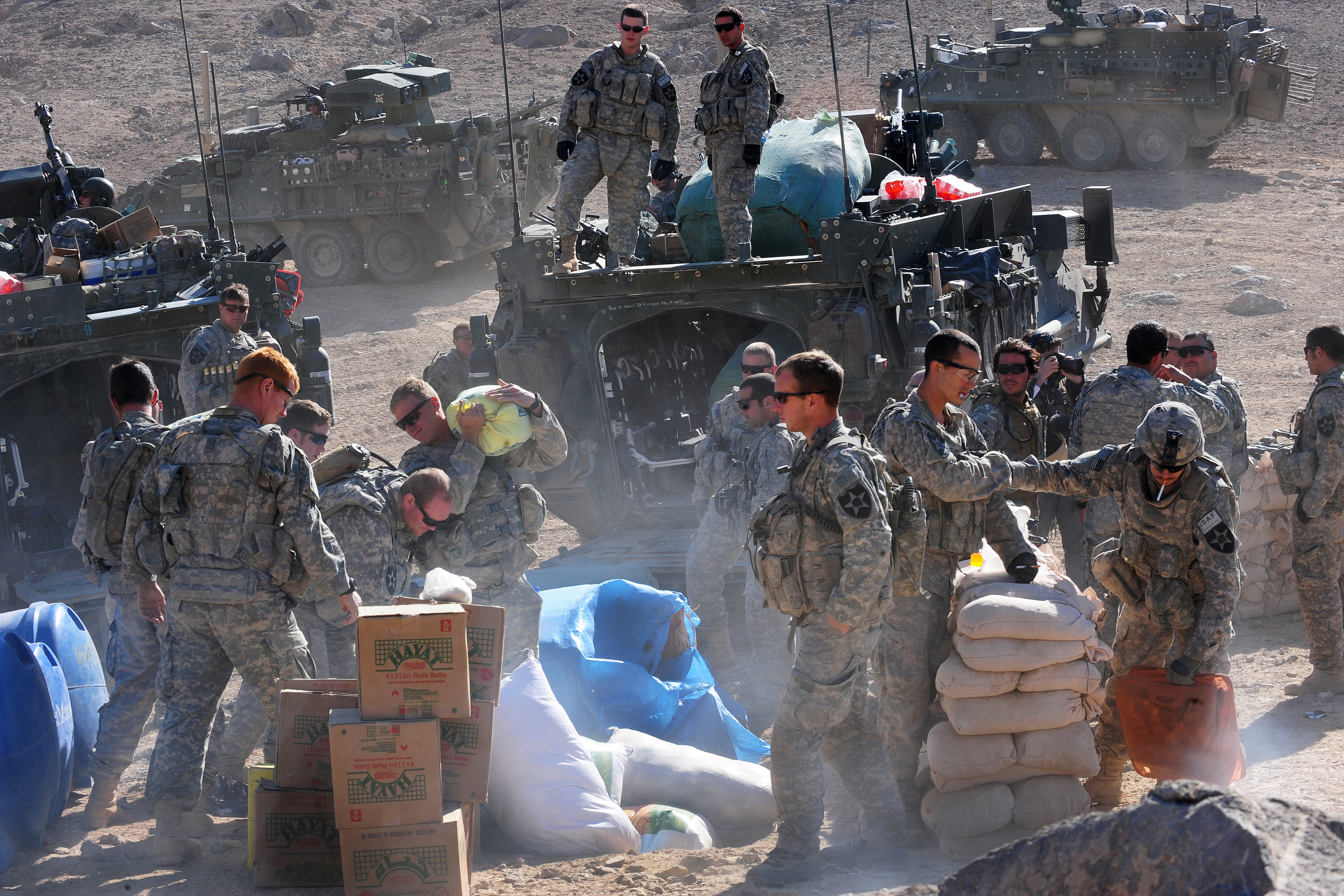
U.S. soldiers unload humanitarian aid for distribution to the town of Rajan Kala, Afghanistan, December 2009.

The U.S. provides military aid through many channels, including direct funding, support for training, or distribution of military equipment. Military aid spending has varied over time, with spending reaching as high as $35 billion in 1952, adjusted for inflation. The United States established a cohesive military aid policy during World War II, when the Lend-Lease program was implemented to support the Allied powers. After the war, the United States continued to provide military aid in line with other foreign aid programs to support American allies. Programs such as Foreign Military Financing and Foreign Military Sales oversee distribution of military aid.

According to a 2016 report by the Congressional Research Service, the U.S. topped the market in global weapon sales for 2015, with $40 billion sold. The largest buyers were Qatar, Egypt, Saudi Arabia, South Korea, Pakistan, Israel, the United Arab Emirates and Iraq. In 2020, the United States distributed $11.6 billion in military aid, the lowest since 2004. Military aid is one of the main forms of foreign aid, with 23% of American foreign aid in 2020 taking the form of military aid. Afghanistan was the primary recipient of American military aid in the 2010s. In 2022, military aid policy in the United States shifted from Afghanistan to Ukraine following the end of the War in Afghanistan and the Russo-Ukrainian war. As of 2021, the United States has military bases in at least 80 countries.

The table below outlines the ten largest recipients of United States military aid in 2020 and their estimated aid in billions.

Recipient	Military aid 2020 (USD billions)
Israel	3.30
Afghanistan	2.76
Egypt	1.30
Iraq	0.5481
Jordan	0.5040
Ukraine	0.2840
Lebanon	0.2445
Philippines	0.1651
Somalia	0.1384
Tunisia	0.1021

=== Missile defense ===
The Strategic Defense Initiative (SDI) was a proposal by U.S. President Ronald Reagan on March 23, 1983 to use ground and space-based systems to protect the United States from attack by strategic nuclear ballistic missiles, later dubbed "Star Wars". The initiative focused on strategic defense rather than the prior strategic offense doctrine of mutual assured destruction (MAD). Though it was never fully developed or deployed, the research and technologies of SDI paved the way for some anti-ballistic missile systems of today.

In February 2007, the U.S. started formal negotiations with Poland and Czech Republic concerning construction of missile shield installations in those countries for a Ground-Based Midcourse Defense system (in April 2007, 57% of Poles opposed the plan). According to press reports, the government of the Czech Republic agreed (while 67% Czechs disagree) to host a missile defense radar on its territory while a base of missile interceptors is supposed to be built in Poland.

Russia threatened to place short-range nuclear missiles on the Russia's border with NATO if the United States refuses to abandon plans to deploy 10 interceptor missiles and a radar in Poland and the Czech Republic. In April 2007, Putin warned of a new Cold War if the Americans deployed the shield in Central Europe. Putin also said that Russia is prepared to abandon its obligations under an Intermediate-Range Nuclear Forces Treaty of 1987 with the United States.

On August 14, 2008, the United States and Poland announced a deal to implement the missile defense system in Polish territory, with a tracking system placed in the Czech Republic. "The fact that this was signed in a period of very difficult crisis in the relations between Russia and the United States over the situation in Georgia shows that, of course, the missile defense system will be deployed not against Iran but against the strategic potential of Russia", Dmitry Rogozin, Russia's NATO envoy, said.

Keir A. Lieber and Daryl G. Press, argue in Foreign Affairs that U.S. missile defenses are designed to secure Washington's nuclear primacy and are chiefly directed at potential rivals, such as Russia and China. The authors note that Washington continues to eschew nuclear first strike and contend that deploying missile defenses "would be valuable primarily in an offensive context, not a defensive one; as an adjunct to a US First Strike capability, not as a stand-alone shield":

If the United States launched a nuclear attack against Russia (or China), the targeted country would be left with only a tiny surviving arsenal, if any at all. At that point, even a relatively modest or inefficient missile defense system might well be enough to protect against any retaliatory strikes.

This analysis is corroborated by the Pentagon's 1992 Defense Planning Guidance (DPG), prepared by then Secretary of Defense Richard Cheney and his deputies. The DPG declares that the United States should use its power to "prevent the reemergence of a new rival" either on former Soviet territory or elsewhere. The authors of the Guidance determined that the United States had to "Field a missile defense system as a shield against accidental missile launches or limited missile strikes by 'international outlaws'" and also must "Find ways to integrate the 'new democracies' of the former Soviet bloc into the U.S.-led system". The National Archive notes that Document 10 of the DPG includes wording about "disarming capabilities to destroy" which is followed by several blacked out words. "This suggests that some of the heavily excised pages in the still-classified DPG drafts may include some discussion of preventive action against threatening nuclear and other WMD programs."

Robert David English, writing in Foreign Affairs, observes that the DPG's second recommendation has also been proceeding on course. "Washington has pursued policies that have ignored Russian interests (and sometimes international law as well) in order to encircle Moscow with military alliances and trade blocs conducive to U.S. interests."

On September 12, 2024, the U.S. disclosed that Russia obtained ballistic missiles from Iran for its war in Ukraine, leading to new sanctions on Russian entities involved. The U.S. also targeted Iran Air and other organizations linked to Iran's missile activities, though Iran denies supplying the weapons. Secretary of State Antony Blinken is set to visit Ukraine and Poland to discuss further support, as Ukraine urges stronger actions.

=== Exporting democracy ===
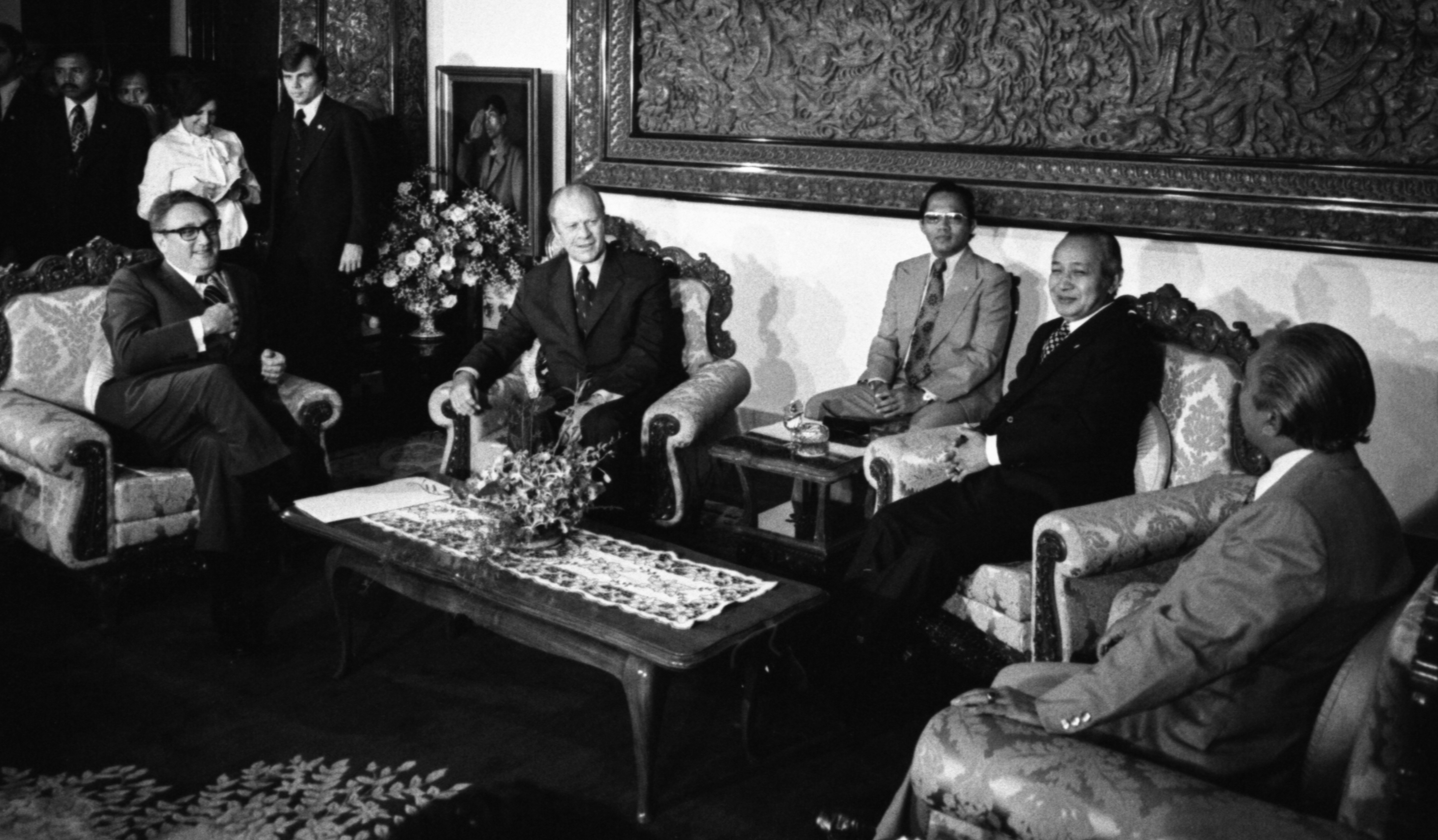
Indonesian President Suharto with U.S. President Gerald Ford in Jakarta on December 6, 1975, one day before the Indonesian invasion of East Timor

Studies have been devoted to the historical success rate of the U.S. in exporting democracy abroad. Some studies of American intervention have been pessimistic about the overall effectiveness of U.S. efforts to encourage democracy in foreign nations. Until recently, scholars have generally agreed with international relations professor Abraham Lowenthal that U.S. attempts to export democracy have been "negligible, often counterproductive, and only occasionally positive". Other studies find U.S. intervention has had mixed results, and another by Hermann and Kegley has found that military interventions have improved democracy in other countries.

== Intelligence policy ==
Intelligence policy is developed by the president and carried out by the United States Intelligence Community, led by the Director of National Intelligence. The Intelligence Community includes 17 offices and bureaus within various executive departments as well as the Central Intelligence Agency. Its stated purpose is to utilize insights, protected information, and understanding of adversaries to advance national security, economic strength, and technological superiority.

The Intelligence Community provides support for all diplomatic and military action undertaken by the United States and serves to inform government and military decision-making, as well as collecting and analyzing global economic and environmental information. The primary functions of the Intelligence Community are the collection and analysis of information, and it is responsible for collecting information on foreign subjects that is not available publicly or through diplomatic channels. Collection of information typically takes the form of signals intelligence, imagery intelligence, and human intelligence. Information collected by American intelligence is used to counter foreign intelligence, terrorism, narcotics trafficking, WMD proliferation, and international organized crime.

=== Counterintelligence ===
The Intelligence Community is responsible for counterintelligence to protect the United States from foreign intelligence services. The Central Intelligence Agency is responsible for counterintelligence activities abroad, while the Federal Bureau of Investigation is responsible for combating foreign intelligence operations in the United States. The goal of American counterintelligence is to protect classified government information as well as trade secrets of American industry. Offensive counterintelligence operations undertaken by the United States include recruiting foreign intelligence agents, monitoring suspected foreign agents, and collecting information on the intentions of foreign intelligence services, while defensive counterintelligence operations include investigating suspected cases of espionage and producing analyses of foreign intelligence threats.

Counterintelligence operations in the United States began when the Espionage Act of 1917 was used to prosecute German infiltrators and saboteurs during World War I. Today, counterintelligence is applied in the United States as a tool of national security. Due to its global influence, the United States is considered to be the world's greatest target for intelligence operations. Terrorists, tyrants, foreign adversaries, and economic competitors have all been found to engage in "a range of intelligence activities" directed against the United States. Terrorist organizations such as al Qaeda have been found to employ intelligence practices similar to those of foreign powers, and American counterintelligence operations play a significant role in counterterrorism.

=== Covert action ===
In addition to intelligence gathering, the Central Intelligence Agency is authorized by the National Security Act of 1947 to engage in covert action. Covert action is undertaken to influence conditions in foreign countries without evidence of American involvement. This may include enacting propaganda campaigns, offering support to factions within a country, providing logistical assistance to foreign governments, or disrupting illegal activities. The use of covert action is controversial within the Intelligence Community due to the potential harm to foreign relations and public image, but most individuals involved in American intelligence cite it as an "essential" option to prevent terrorism, drug trafficking, and the proliferation of weapons of mass destruction.

==== Examples of covert involvement in regime change ====
United States foreign policy also includes covert actions to topple foreign governments that have been opposed to the United States. According to J. Dana Stuster, writing in Foreign Policy, there are seven "confirmed cases" where the U.S. — acting principally through the Central Intelligence Agency (CIA), but sometimes with the support of other parts of the U.S. government, including the Navy and State Department—covertly assisted in the overthrow of a foreign government: Iran in 1953, Guatemala in 1954, Congo in 1960, the Dominican Republic in 1961, South Vietnam in 1963, Brazil in 1964, and Chile in 1973. Stuster states that this list excludes "U.S.-supported insurgencies and failed assassination attempts" such as those directed against Cuba's Fidel Castro, as well as instances where U.S. involvement has been alleged but not proven (such as Syria in 1949).

In 1953, the CIA, working with the British government, initiated Operation Ajax against the Prime Minister of Iran Mohammad Mossadegh who had attempted to nationalize Iran's oil, threatening the interests of the Anglo-Persian Oil Company. This had the effect of restoring and strengthening the authoritarian monarchical reign of Shah Mohammad Reza Pahlavi. In 1957, the CIA and Israeli Mossad aided the Iranian government in establishing its intelligence service, SAVAK, later blamed for the torture and execution of the regime's opponents.

A year later, in Operation PBSuccess, the CIA assisted the local military in toppling the democratically elected left-wing government of Jacobo Árbenz in Guatemala and installing the military dictator Carlos Castillo Armas. The United Fruit Company lobbied for Árbenz's overthrow as his land reforms jeopardized their land holdings in Guatemala, and painted these reforms as a communist threat. The coup triggered a decades long civil war which claimed the lives of an estimated 200,000 people (42,275 individual cases have been documented), mostly through 626 massacres against the Maya population perpetrated by the U.S.-backed Guatemalan military. An independent Historical Clarification Commission found that U.S. corporations and government officials "exercised pressure to maintain the country's archaic and unjust socio-economic structure", and that U.S. military assistance had a "significant bearing on human rights violations during the armed confrontation".

During the massacre of at least 500,000 alleged communists in 1960s Indonesia, U.S. government officials encouraged and applauded the mass killings while providing covert assistance to the Indonesian military which helped facilitate them. This included the U.S. Embassy in Jakarta supplying Indonesian forces with lists of up to 5,000 names of suspected members of the Communist Party of Indonesia (PKI), who were subsequently killed in the massacres. In 2001, the CIA attempted to prevent the publication of the State Department volume Foreign Relations of the United States, 1964–1968, which documents the U.S. role in providing covert assistance to the Indonesian military for the express purpose of the extirpation of the PKI. In July 2016, an international panel of judges ruled the killings constitute crimes against humanity, and that the US, along with other Western governments, were complicit in these crimes.

In 1970, the CIA worked with coup-plotters in Chile in the attempted kidnapping of General René Schneider, who was targeted for refusing to participate in a military coup upon the election of Salvador Allende. Schneider was shot in the botched attempt and died three days later. The CIA later paid the group $35,000 for the failed kidnapping.

According to one peer-reviewed study, the U.S. intervened in 81 foreign elections between 1946 and 2000.

The failed 1961 CIA Bay of Pigs Invasion in Cuba was an attempt by the U.S. government to overthrow a regime. Not only did this cause a diplomatic embarrassment, it also damaged the CIA's credibility internationally.

== Public image ==
United States foreign policy has been the subject of debate, receiving praise and criticism domestically and abroad. As of 2019, public opinion in the United States is closely divided on American involvement in world affairs. 53% of Americans wish for the United States to be active in world affairs, while 46% of Americans wish for less involvement overseas. American involvement in the global economy is received more positively by the American people, with 73% considering it to be a "good thing".

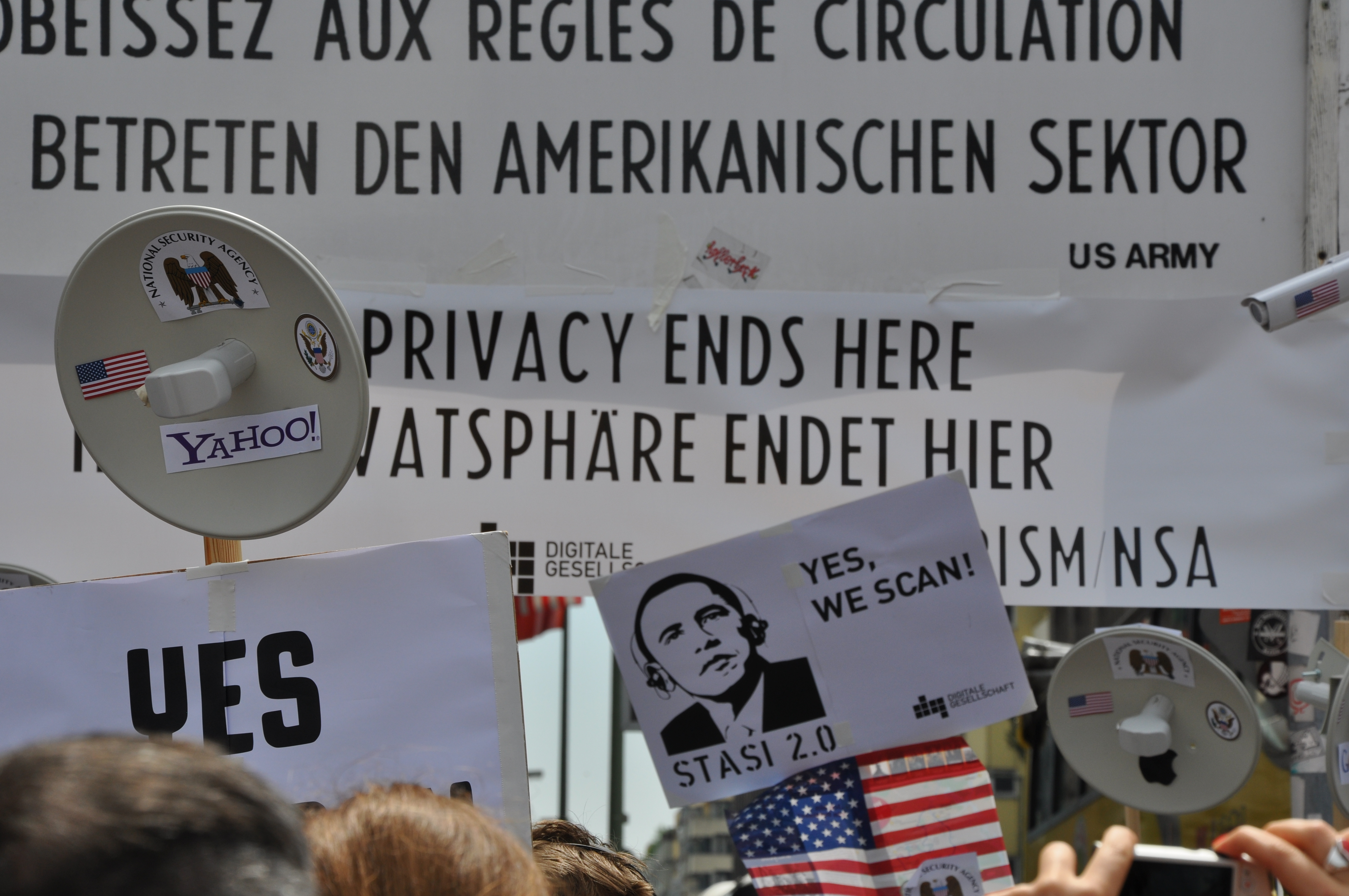
Demonstration at Checkpoint Charlie in Berlin against the NSA surveillance program PRISM, June 2013

=== Global opinion ===
Public opinion on the US (2022) < -40 -20 to -5 -4 to +4 +5 to +20 +20 to +34 +35 to +49 +50 to +64 > +65

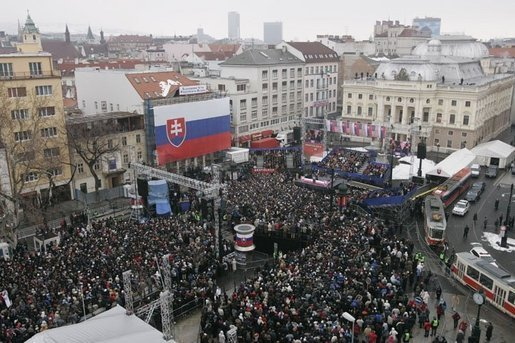
President George W. Bush and Slovakia's Prime Minister Mikulas Dzurinda are greeted by a crowd of thousands gathered in Bratislava's Hviezdoslavovo Square (February 2005).

International opinion about the US has often changed with different executive administrations. For example, in 2009, the French public favored the United States when President Barack Obama (75% favorable) replaced President George W. Bush (42%). After President Donald Trump took the helm in 2017, French public opinion about the US fell from 63% to 46%. These trends were also seen in other European countries. According to the 2025 Pew report, trust in the US president in high-income countries has fallen from 53% in 2024, when US President Joe Biden was in power, to 22% after Trump returned to the White House.

Many democracies have voluntary military ties with the United States. See NATO, ANZUS, U.S.-Japan Security Treaty, Mutual Defense Treaty with South Korea, and Major non-NATO ally. Those nations with military alliances with the U.S. can spend less on the military since they can count on U.S. protection. This may give a false impression that the U.S. is less peaceful than those nations. A 2013 global poll in 65 countries found that the United States is perceived as the biggest threat to world peace, with 24% of respondents identifying it as such. A majority of Russian respondents named the United States as the greatest threat, as well as significant minorities in China, Bosnia and Herzegovina, Argentina, Greece, Turkey, and Pakistan. A 2025 Pew survey in 24 countries, including 10 European countries, found that the share of respondents who have a positive view of the United States had declined in most of them compared to 2024. According to a 2025 Pew survey conducted in 25 countries, only 35% of respondents had a positive view of the United States, down from 51% in 2024.

=== Foreign intervention ===
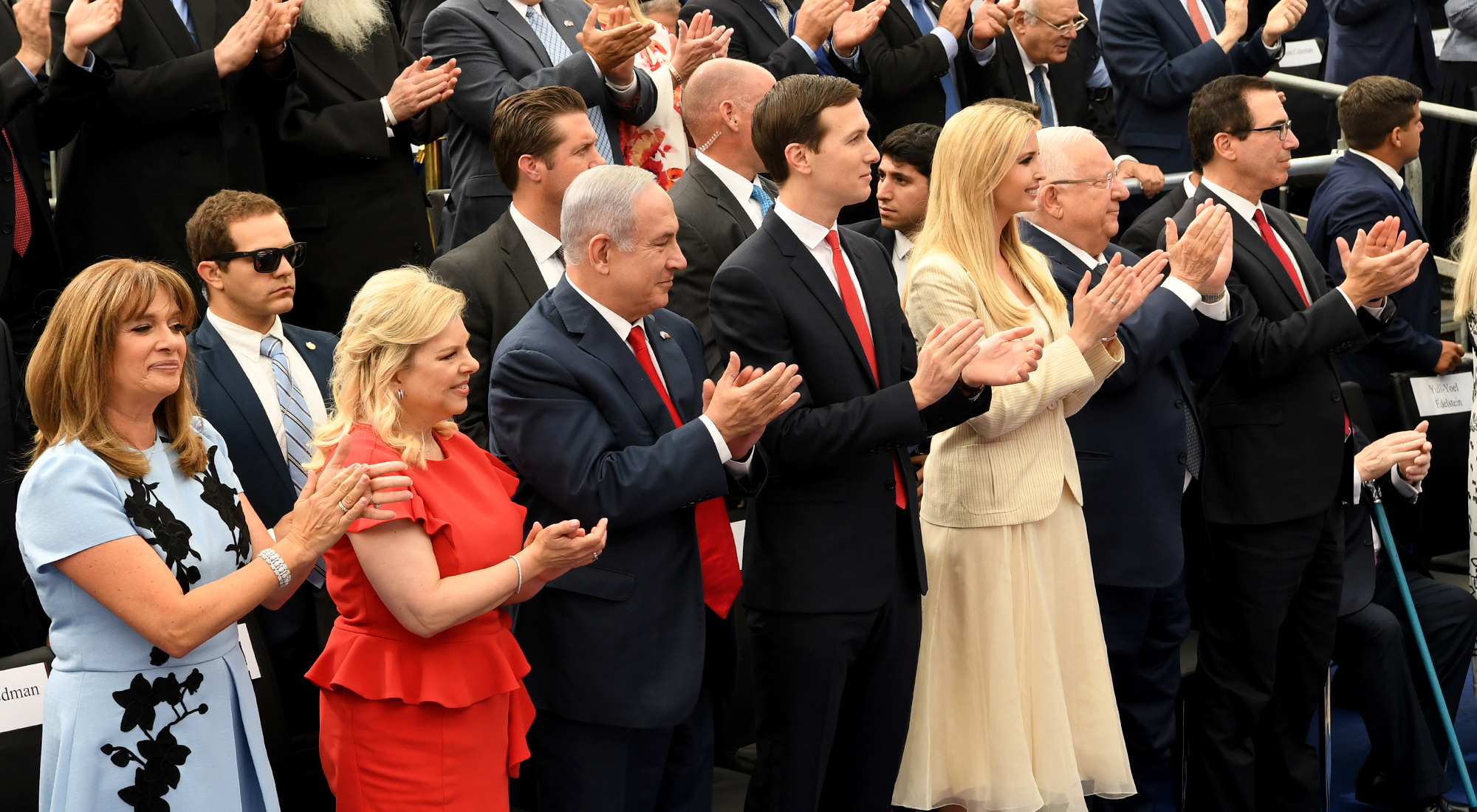
Dedication ceremony of the Embassy of the United States in Jerusalem, Israel, 14 May 2018

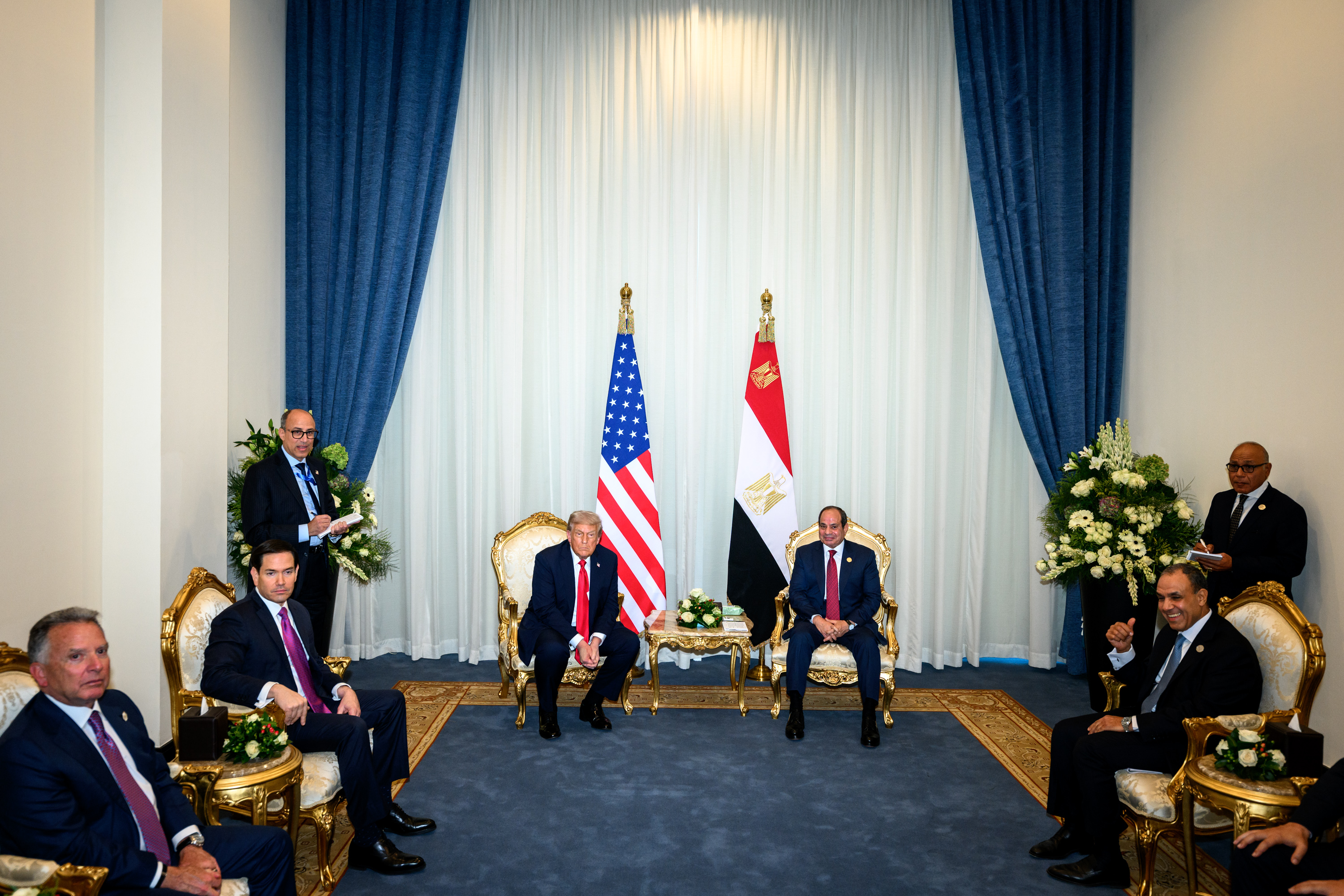
US President Donald Trump meeting Egypt's President Abdel Fattah El-Sisi on sidelines of Sharm El-Sheikh Peace Summit, Sharm El Sheikh, Egypt, 13 October 2025

Empirical studies (see democide) have found that democracies, including the United States, inflict significantly fewer civilian casualties than dictatorships. Media may be biased against the U.S. regarding reporting human rights violations. Studies have found that The New York Times coverage of worldwide human rights violations predominantly focuses on the human rights violations in nations where there is clear U.S. involvement, while having relatively little coverage of the human rights violations in other nations. For example, the bloodiest war in recent time, involving eight nations and killing millions of civilians, was the Second Congo War, which was almost completely ignored by the media.

Journalists and human rights organizations have been critical of US-led airstrikes and targeted killings by drones which have in some cases resulted in collateral damage of civilian populations. In early 2017, the U.S. faced criticism from some scholars, activists and media outlets for dropping 26,171 bombs on seven countries throughout 2016: Syria, Iraq, Afghanistan, Libya, Yemen, Somalia and Pakistan.

Research on the democratic peace theory has generally found that democracies, including the United States, have not made war on one another. There have been U.S. support for coups against some democracies, but for example Spencer R. Weart argues that part of the explanation was the perception, correct or not, that these states were turning into Communist dictatorships. Also important was the role of rarely transparent United States government agencies, who sometimes mislead or did not fully implement the decisions of elected civilian leaders.

Critics from the left cite episodes that undercut leftist governments or showed support for Israel. Others cite human rights abuses and violations of international law. Critics have charged that the U.S. presidents have used democracy to justify military intervention abroad. Critics also point to declassified records which indicate that the CIA under Allen Dulles and the FBI under J. Edgar Hoover aggressively recruited more than 1,000 Nazis, including those responsible for war crimes, to use as spies and informants against the Soviet Union in the Cold War.

Studies have been devoted to the historical success rate of the U.S. in exporting democracy abroad. Some studies of American intervention have been pessimistic about the overall effectiveness of U.S. efforts to encourage democracy in foreign nations. Some scholars have generally agreed with international relations professor Abraham Lowenthal that U.S. attempts to export democracy have been "negligible, often counterproductive, and only occasionally positive". Other studies find U.S. intervention has had mixed results, and another by Hermann and Kegley has found that military interventions have improved democracy in other countries.

America's history of non-intervention has been criticized as well. In his World Policy Journal review of Bill Kauffman's 1995 book America First! Its History, Culture, and Politics, Benjamin Schwartz described America's history of isolationism as a "tragedy" and being rooted in Puritan thinking.

The U.S. historically stated that democratic nations best support U.S. national interests. According to former U.S. President Bill Clinton, "Ultimately, the best strategy to ensure our security and to build a durable peace is to support the advance of democracy elsewhere. Democracies don't attack each other." In one view mentioned by the U.S. State Department, democracy is also good for business. Countries that embrace political reforms are also more likely to pursue economic reforms that improve the productivity of businesses. Accordingly, since the mid-1980s, under President Ronald Reagan, there has been an increase in levels of foreign direct investment going to emerging market democracies relative to countries that have not undertaken political reforms. Leaked cables in 2010 suggested that the "dark shadow of terrorism still dominates the United States' relations with the world".

The United States officially maintained that it supports democracy and human rights through several tools. Examples of these tools are as follows:

- A published yearly report by the State Department entitled "Advancing Freedom and Democracy", issued in compliance with ADVANCE Democracy Act of 2007 (earlier the report was known as "Supporting Human Rights and Democracy: The U.S. Record" and was issued in compliance with a 2002 law).
- A yearly published "Country Reports on Human Rights Practices".
- In 2006 (under President George W. Bush), the United States created a "Human Rights Defenders Fund" and "Freedom Awards".
- The "Human Rights and Democracy Achievement Award" recognizes the exceptional achievement of officers of foreign affairs agencies posted abroad.
- The "Ambassadorial Roundtable Series", created in 2006, are informal discussions between newly confirmed U.S. ambassadors and human rights and democracy non-governmental organizations.
- The National Endowment for Democracy, a private non-profit created by Congress in 1983 (and signed into law by President Ronald Reagan), which is mostly funded by the U.S. Government and gives cash grants to strengthen democratic institutions around the world.

=== Support for authoritarian governments ===
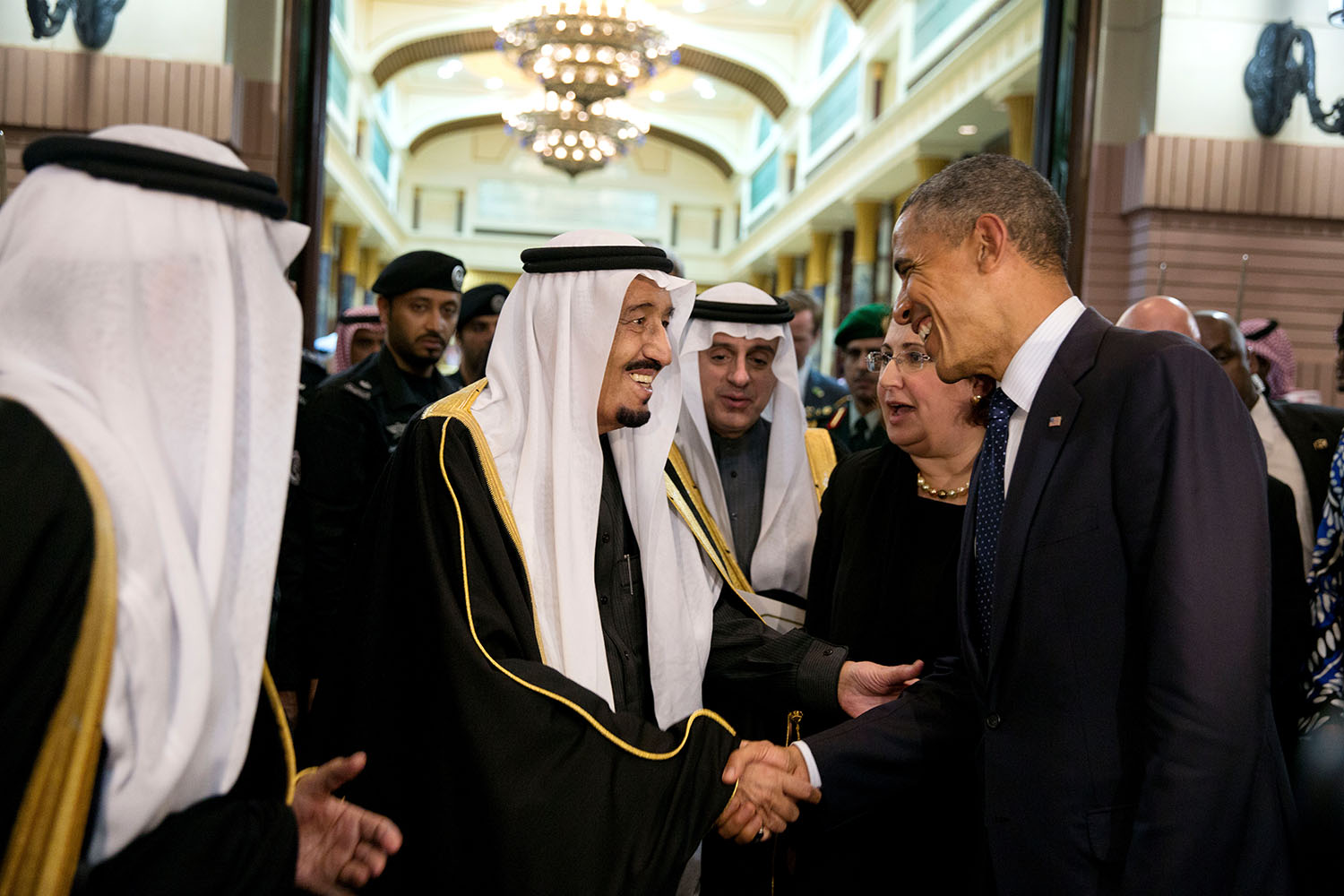
Barack Obama with King Salman of Saudi Arabia, January 2015. According to Amnesty International, "For too long, the USA has shied away from publicly confronting Saudi Arabia over its human rights record, largely turning a blind eye to a mounting catalogue of abuses."

Both currently and historically, the United States has been willing to cooperate with authoritarian governments to pursue its geopolitical goals. The U.S. has faced criticism for backing right-wing dictators that systematically violated human rights, such as Augusto Pinochet of Chile, Alfredo Stroessner of Paraguay, Efraín Ríos Montt of Guatemala, Jorge Rafael Videla of Argentina, Hissène Habré of Chad Yahya Khan of Pakistan, and Suharto of Indonesia. Critics have also accused the United States of facilitating and supporting state terrorism in the Global South during the Cold War, such as Operation Condor, an international campaign of political assassination and state terror organized by right-wing military dictatorships in the Southern Cone of South America.

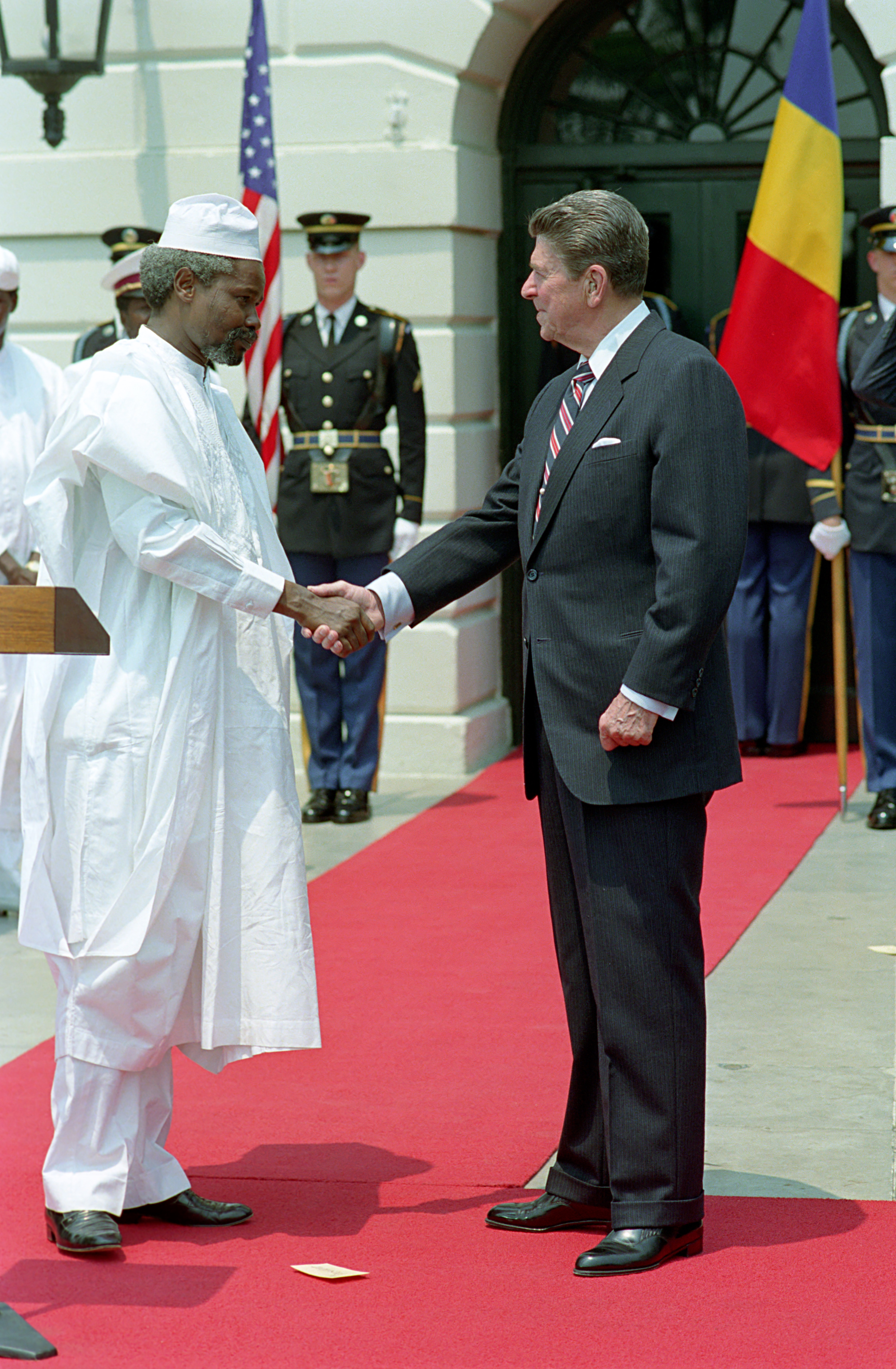
Ronald Reagan with Hissène Habré at the White House

Regarding support for certain anti-Communist dictatorships during the Cold War, a response is that they were seen as a necessary evil, with the alternatives even worse Communist or fundamentalist dictatorships. David Schmitz says this policy did not serve U.S. interests. Friendly tyrants resisted necessary reforms and destroyed the political center (though not in South Korea), while the 'realist' policy of coddling dictators brought a backlash among foreign populations with long memories. Some critical scholars and journalists, including Jason Hickel and Vincent Bevins, argue that the U.S. backed such dictators in order to reinforce Western business interests and to expand capitalism into countries of the Global South who were attempting to pursue alternative paths.

The U.S. has been accused of complicity in war crimes for backing the Saudi Arabian-led intervention into the Yemeni Civil War, which has triggered a humanitarian catastrophe, including a cholera outbreak and millions facing starvation.

Niall Ferguson argues that the U.S. is incorrectly blamed for all of the human rights violations perpetrated by U.S.-supported governments. Ferguson writes that there is general agreement that Guatemala was the worst of the U.S.-backed regimes during the Cold War, but the U.S. cannot be credibly blamed for all of the estimated 200,000 deaths during the long Guatemalan Civil War. The U.S. Intelligence Oversight Board writes that military aid was cut for long periods because of such violations, that the U.S. helped stop a coup in 1993, and that efforts were made to improve the conduct of the security services.

=== Human rights ===
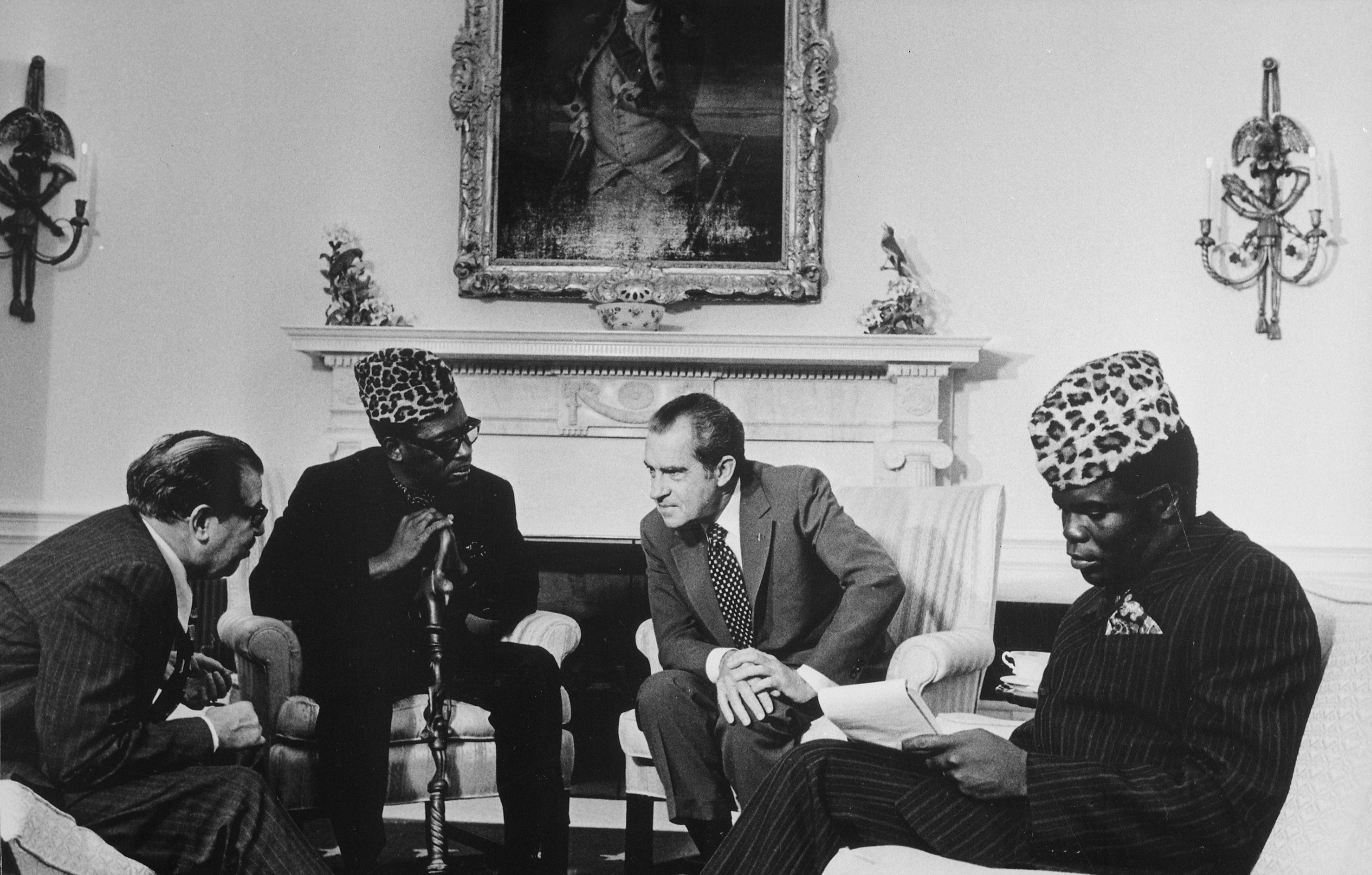
Zairean dictator Mobutu Sese Seko and Richard Nixon in Washington, D.C., October 1973

Since the 1970s, issues of human rights have become increasingly important in American foreign policy. Congress took the lead in the 1970s. Following the Vietnam War, the feeling that U.S. foreign policy had grown apart from traditional American values was seized upon by Representative Donald M. Fraser (D, MN), leading the Subcommittee on International Organizations and Movements, in criticizing Republican Foreign Policy under the Nixon administration. In the early 1970s, Congress concluded the Vietnam War and passed the War Powers Act. As "part of a growing assertiveness by Congress about many aspects of Foreign Policy", human rights concerns became a battleground between the Legislative and the Executive branches in the formulation of foreign policy. David Forsythe points to three specific, early examples of Congress interjecting its own thoughts on foreign policy:

1. Subsection (a) of the International Financial Assistance Act of 1977: ensured assistance through international financial institutions would be limited to countries "other than those whose governments engage in a consistent pattern of gross violations of internationally recognized human rights".
2. Section 116 of the Foreign Assistance Act of 1961, as amended in 1984: reads in part, "No assistance may be provided under this part to the government of any country which engages in a consistent pattern of gross violations of internationally recognized human rights."
3. Section 502B of the Foreign Assistance Act of 1961, as amended in 1978: "No security assistance may be provided to any country the government of which engages in a consistent pattern of gross violations of internationally recognized human rights."

These measures were repeatedly used by Congress, with varying success, to affect U.S. foreign policy towards the inclusion of Human Rights concerns. Specific examples include El Salvador, Nicaragua, Guatemala and South Africa. The Executive (from Nixon to Reagan) argued that the Cold War required placing regional security in favor of U.S. interests over any behavioral concerns of national allies. Congress argued the opposite, in favor of distancing the United States from oppressive regimes. Nevertheless, according to historian Daniel Goldhagen, during the last two decades of the Cold War, the number of American client states practicing mass murder outnumbered those of the Soviet Union. John Henry Coatsworth, a historian of Latin America and the provost of Columbia University, suggests the number of repression victims in Latin America alone far surpassed that of the USSR and its East European satellites during the period 1960 to 1990. W. John Green contends that the United States was an "essential enabler" of "Latin America's political murder habit, bringing out and allowing to flourish some of the region's worst tendencies".

On December 6, 2011, Obama instructed agencies to consider LGBT rights when issuing financial aid to foreign countries. He also criticized Russia's law discriminating against gays, joining other western leaders in the boycott of the 2014 Winter Olympics in Russia.

In June 2014, a Chilean court ruled that the United States played a key role in the murders of Charles Horman and Frank Teruggi, both American citizens, shortly after the 1973 Chilean coup d'état.

== See also ==
- American entry into World War I
- International relations, 1648–1814
- International relations of the Great Powers (1814–1919)
- International relations (1919–1939)
- United States and state-sponsored terrorism
- Perceptions of the United States sanctions
- Criticism of United States foreign policy

=== Diplomacy ===
- Cowboy diplomacy
- List of diplomatic missions in the United States
- List of diplomatic missions of the United States
- United States and the United Nations
- United States foreign adversaries

=== Intelligence ===
- Extraordinary rendition
- Special Activities Division
- Torture and the United States

=== Policy and doctrine ===
- Anti-Americanism
- Bush Doctrine
- China containment policy
- Détente
- Human rights in the United States
- Human Rights Record of the United States (Chinese publication)
- Kirkpatrick Doctrine
- Powell Doctrine
- Special Relationship
- Three Ds of foreign policy
