= DS3 =

DS3, DS-3, or DS 3 may refer to:

== Science and technology ==
- (29823) 1999 DS3, a main-belt minor planet
- Digital Signal 3, a digital signal level 3 T-carrier

== Transportation ==
- DS3 (locomotive), an AC electric locomotive
- DS 3, a French supermini car
  - Citroën DS3 WRC, a French WRC rally car
- DS 3 Crossback, a French subcompact crossover

== Video games ==
=== Games ===
- Dark Souls III, a 2016 video game
- Darksiders III, a 2018 video game
- Darkstalkers 3, a 1997 video game
- Dead Space 3, a 2013 video game
- Dungeon Siege III, a 2011 video game

=== Consoles ===
- DualShock 3, a gamepad by Sony for the PlayStation 3

== Other uses ==
- Army Wounded Warrior Program, a program formerly known as Disabled Soldier Support System (DS3)

== See also ==
- Nintendo 3DS, a handheld game console
- 3DS (disambiguation)
- Drip Season 3, an album by Gunna
