= Three Ds of foreign policy =

The three Ds of foreign policy (also sometimes called a 3D approach, the 3Ds of U.S. national security, the 3Ds of national security strategy, or the 3D model) is a concept in United States foreign policy strategy. The three Ds are defense, diplomacy, and development. The idea is that all three of these areas are about equally important. Defense is often handled by the Department of Defense, diplomacy is handled by the Department of State, and development is handled by the US Agency for International Development (USAID).

== Origin ==
An article in Foreign Policy speculates that the concept was inspired by a George W. Bush speech in 2001 at the World Bank, where Bush argued that the United States should have three goals: keep the peace, economic growth, and partnerships with developing countries. The 2002 National Security Strategy document, and the statements of a USAID official, are also mentioned as possible origins.

The 3Ds are used in the 2010 National Security Strategy document and the 2011 foreign aid budget.

== The three Ds ==
Defense involves maintaining a powerful military, both for warfare and deterrence. Warfare is risky and controversial, and is typically an option of last resort, and can occur when diplomacy becomes tense and development aid is ineffective or rejected. There are international laws and treaties governing warfare. A lot of diplomacy occurs during a war, typically behind the scenes. If avoiding conflict is a priority, a country may choose to prioritize diplomacy and development over defense. In terms of spending, the United States tends to prioritize defense over diplomacy and development. Focusing on defense can bolster national security.

Diplomacy involves building partnerships and engaging with other countries. This includes bilateral diplomacy and negotiations. Topics of discussion in diplomacy can include public health emergencies, United Nations votes, trade deals, and other topics. There is often coordination between the foreign ministry and the ambassador via demarches. Diplomacy involves resolving conflicts and fulfilling requests from allies. Focusing on diplomacy can bolster stability. Diplomacy is very safe for diplomats compared to development and defense; diplomacy typically takes place in capital cities and embassies, whereas development may take place in poverty-stricken areas, and defense may involve dangerous warfare.

Development (foreign aid) involves spending on things that build better lives for the citizens of a country. Areas for foreign aid are identified during the course of diplomacy, and not all countries may need foreign aid. Some side effects of foreign aid are that it reduces global poverty and it expands the aid provider's influence over the host nation. A positive side effect is that this may create new economic opportunities for American trade. Former Secretary of State Hillary Clinton argued that there is a link between terrorism and young people with no jobs, and that development can address this. Focusing on development can bolster stability. There is opportunity for very large amounts of development after a war. Former Secretary of Defense Jim Mattis one stated that not fully funding USAID would result in needing to buy more ammunition, suggesting a strong link between development and defense.

== See also ==
- Three Ds of antisemitism
