= Moroccan settlers =

Migration into the Moroccan-occupied Western Sahara

As part of the Western Sahara conflict, the Kingdom of Morocco has sponsored settlement schemes that have enticed thousands of Moroccan citizens to relocate to the Moroccan-occupied Western Sahara. This regulated migration has been in effect since the Green March in 1975, and it was estimated in 2015 that Moroccan settlers accounted for two-thirds of the 500,000 inhabitants of Western Sahara.

Under international law, the transfer of Moroccan citizens into the occupied territory constitutes a direct violation of Article 49 of the Fourth Geneva Convention (cf. Turkish settlers in Northern Cyprus and Israeli settlers in the Palestinian territories).

== History ==
=== Spanish disengagement ===
Western Sahara came under Spanish rule as a protectorate in 1884, wherein the territory extended from Cape Bojador to Cape Blanc. Spain gradually extended its control over the region over the next 40 years by negotiating with France. Spanish Sahara was formally established in 1958 after two earlier administrative districts, Río de Oro and Saguia el Hamra, were combined.

Amid pressure from nationalists in Spanish Sahara, Morocco, Mauritania, and Algeria, Spain disengaged from Western Sahara in 1976. The remaining territory was divided between Morocco and Mauritania, frustrating Algerian leaders and prompting them to begin supporting a Sahrawi nationalist group, the Polisario Front. In the late 1970s, the group began conducting guerrilla warfare in Morocco and Mauritania, but Mauritania soon ceded its claim to the territory, leaving Morocco as the only state belligerent. The war with Morocco caused about half of the Western Sahara's Sahrawi to flee the area, leaving a gap for Moroccan settlers to fill.

== Moroccan settlements and the Western Sahara conflict ==
Moroccan settlements have played a complex role in the resolution of the Western Sahara conflict.

=== Government support ===
The Kingdom of Morocco supports the settlements financially and administratively, with many incentives given to citizens who choose to relocate to Western Sahara. For example, government employees that live in the Western Sahara earn roughly twice the amount that their colleagues in the rest of the Kingdom earn.

=== Attitude of the Polisario Front ===
The Polisario Front disagrees with the presence of settlers in the Western Sahara and sees them as a significant barrier to self-rule. In a 2018 conversation between Brahim Ghali, Secretary-General of the Polisario Front, and Horst Koehler, the United Nations Secretary-General's Personal Envoy to Western Sahara, Ghali noted that Moroccan settlements were a major area of concern. Specifically, the presence of settlers is significantly shifting the demographic makeup of the region, posing a significant roadblock to a resolution.

For the Polisario Front, Moroccan settlers now constituting the majority of the population of Western Sahara precludes the possibility of an independence referendum. Wary that any independence vote would either force a union with Morocco or continue Moroccan dominance over Western Sahara, few are open to such a referendum without decolonization and the repatriation of settlers to Morocco.

== International response ==
=== United Nations ===
The United Nations has attempted to mediate claims to the Western Sahara, with settlers being a major area of contention. In the early 2000s, UN Secretary General Kofi Annan's Personal Envoy to the Western Sahara, James Baker, held multiple meetings with Moroccan and Polisario officials to discuss the future of the Western Sahara. They were ultimately ineffective and inflamed relations. Baker also put forth two peace plans that would introduce a four-year phase of autonomy to the Western Sahara and then put independence to a referendum-style vote. At either point, either the Polisario Front or Morocco denied the plan.

=== United States ===
Responses from other countries regarding settlers have been scarce. Though the United States Department of State, for example, has issued human rights reports for the Western Sahara, they have not made reference to settlers.

== See also ==
- Western Sahara conflict
- Turkish settlers in Northern Cyprus
- Israeli settlers in the Palestinian territories
