= Three D Radio =

Coordinates: 34°54′39″S 138°37′34″E

Australia
- Broadcast area: Adelaide
- Frequency: 93.7 MHz FM

Programming
- Format: No formal playlist

Ownership
- Owner: Community Based

History
- First air date: 1979
- Former call signs: 5MMM

Links
- Website: http://www.threedradio.com/

Three D Radio (call sign: 5DDD) is a community radio station based in Adelaide, Australia and located in St Peters, South Australia. Established as 5MMM in 1979, it broadcasts on 93.7 MHz across the greater metropolitan area of Adelaide and the surrounding rural areas, as well as a live stream via its website. Three D Radio is run by volunteers, with no paid staff and is funded by contributions made by its listeners and grants.

== History ==
The Triple M callsign was purchased in the early 1990s by Village Roadshow, for their national radio network of stations under that name. Although the terms of the deal were not disclosed, the major cash injection allowed the station to purchase modern equipment and maintain running costs for quite some time. The station changed its name to Three D Radio on 1 October 1993.

== Format ==
There are over 60 diverse programs going to air each week to an average cumulative audience of over 110,000 listeners.

Three D Radio is run by the PMBA, or Progressive Music Broadcasting Association. They are committed to playing contemporary, progressive and alternative music and support the local music and arts community in a way that few other Adelaide radio stations do.

There are no playlists. Announcers are free to choose the music that they present; however, there are strict quotas which ensure that content is at least 40% Australian music, of which half is local South Australian releases and a quarter is local unsigned material. Another quarter of music content is from female artists, who historically have been under-represented in broadcast music.

== See also ==
- List of radio stations in Australia
