= Three Ds of antisemitism =

Criteria aiming to distinguish criticism of Israel from antisemitism

The three Ds of antisemitism or the 3D test of antisemitism is a set of criteria formulated in 2003 by Israeli human rights advocate and politician Natan Sharansky in order to distinguish legitimate criticism of Israel from antisemitism. The "three Ds" stand for delegitimization, demonization, and double standards, each of which, according to the test, indicates antisemitism.

The test is intended to draw the line between on one hand legitimate criticism of Israel, its actions and policies, and on the other hand antisemitism hidden behind a facade of anti-Zionism. The three Ds test is intended to rebut arguments that "any criticism toward the State of Israel is considered antisemitic, and therefore legitimate criticism is silenced and ignored." This test was adopted by the U.S. Department of State in 2010, but later replaced by the IHRA definition of antisemitism in 2017.

The test has been criticized for vagueness, and has raised concerns of possible abuse among some people that it labels legitimate criticism of Israeli policies as antisemitic.

== Author and history ==
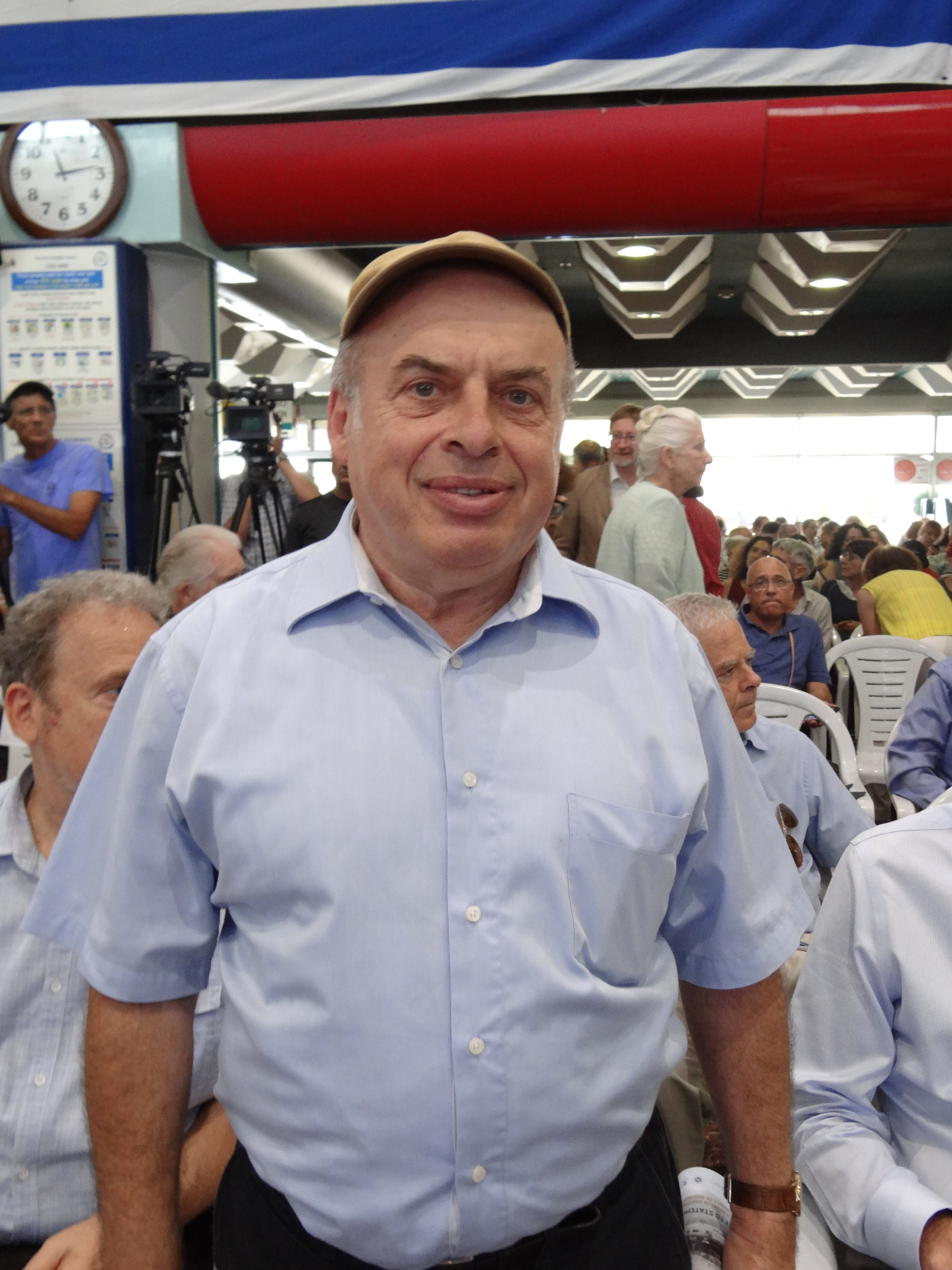
The test was formulated by Soviet dissident and Israeli politician Natan Sharansky.

The concept was formulated by Israeli politician and Soviet dissident Natan Sharansky in 2003, who at the time was a minister without portfolio in the Israeli government. It was first published in Jewish Political Studies Review, a journal run by the conservative Israeli think tank Jerusalem Center for Public Affairs, in 2004.

== Main concepts ==
According to Sharansky, the 3D test prevents situations where antisemitism is allowed to "hide behind the veneer of legitimate criticism of Israel". In other cases, the 3D test is used to identify when anti-Zionist rhetoric crosses the line into antisemitism, even if the original motivation was not antisemitic. Canadian MP Irwin Cotler has said that "we've got to set up certain boundaries of where [criticism of Israel] does cross the line, because I'm one of those who believes strongly, not only in free speech, but also in rigorous debate, and discussion, and dialectic, and the like. If you say too easily that everything is anti-Semitic, then nothing is anti-Semitic, and we no longer can make distinctions."

=== Delegitimization ===
The term "delegitimization of Israel" refers to the denial of the Jewish people's right to self-determination, for example, by claiming that the existence of a State of Israel is a racist endeavor. This claim allegedly discriminates against Jews by singling them out as ineligible for the basic right for self-determination as it is determined by the international law. Since any discrimination against a specific ethnic, religious, racial or national group is considered a type of racism, delegitimization of the Jewish people right for self-determination is labeled as racism against Jews, i.e. antisemitism.

Former Deputy Prime Minister of Sweden, Per Ahlmark, an advocate in the combating of antisemitism, wrote: "compared to most previous anti-Jewish outbreaks, this new antisemitism is often less directed against individual Jews. It attacks primarily the collective Jews, the state of Israel and then such attacks start a chain reaction of assaults on individual Jews and Jewish institutions. ... in the past the most dangerous anti-Semites were those who wanted to make the world judenrein, free of Jews. Today, the most dangerous anti-Semites might be those who want to make the world Judenstaatrein, free of a Jewish state." Irwin Cotler has defined delegitimization as one of the nine sets of what he calls "new antisemitism". Cotler uses the term political anti-Semitism to describe the denial of the Jewish people's right to self-determination and the de-legitimization of Israel as a state.

=== Demonization ===
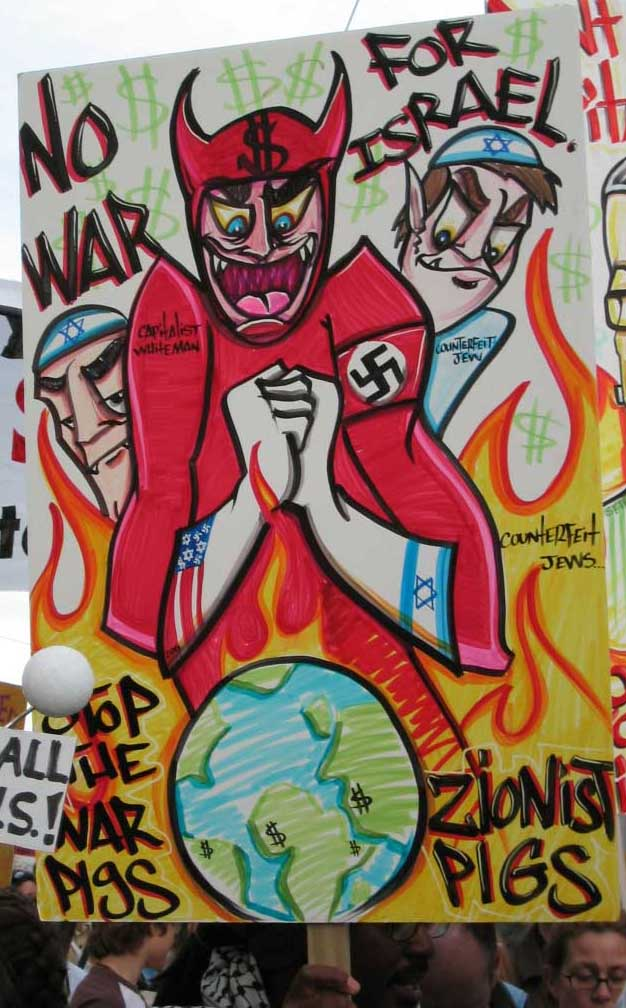
Cartoon demonizing Israel at a rally against the Iraq War in San Francisco, February 2003

The second "D" refers to the portrayal of certain groups as evil, demonic, or satanic. The IHRA definition of antisemitism says that antisemitism "frequently charges Jews with conspiring to harm humanity, and it is often used to blame Jews for 'why things go wrong'. It is expressed in speech, writing, visual forms and actions, and employs sinister stereotypes and negative character traits". If the criticism uses metaphors, images or rhetoric that implies that the Israelis or Jews are evil, it is once again a projection of antisemitic blood libels and rhetoric. One example of it might be making mendacious, dehumanizing, demonizing, or stereotypical allegations about Jews as such or the power of Jews as collective—such as, especially but not exclusively, the myth about the world Jewish conspiracy or of Jews controlling the media, economy, government or other societal institutions.

=== Double standards ===
The last "D" refers to the application of different sets of principles on similar situations. If a person criticizes Israel and only Israel on certain issues, but chooses to ignore similar situations conducted by other countries they are performing a double standard policy against Israel.

The implementation of a different moral standard for Jews and Israel compared to the rest of the world, just like the delegitimization claim, discriminates against a specific group and is labeled as antisemitism. Similar arguments were made by Thomas Friedman, stating that Boycott, Divestment and Sanctions (BDS) movements that ignore the situation in Syria, Saudi Arabia, and Iran are hypocritical and antisemitic. On the same matter, Friedman has also written that the "criticizing Israel is not anti-Semitic, and saying so is vile. But singling out Israel for opprobrium and international sanction—out of all proportion to any other party in the Middle East—is anti-Semitic, and not saying so is dishonest". Irwin Cotler has also included double standards as one of the nine sets of what he calls "new anti-Semitism". Cotler offers the denial to Israel of equality before the law in the international arena (i.e., "the singling out of Israel for differential and discriminatory treatment in the international arena") as a new antisemitic act.

== Example of application ==
Abraham Foxman gives the following example. During the Second Intifada, a cartoon of an Israeli soldier pointing a rifle at a Palestinian baby was published. This kind of scene is not antisemitism. However, the baby was a typical depiction of the baby Jesus, who was telling to the soldier (in the caption), "Oh, you’re doing it to me all over again." Therefore, this is an example of the second "D", demonization via the antisemitic canard of Jewish deicide.

== Question of double standards on settlements in occupied territories ==
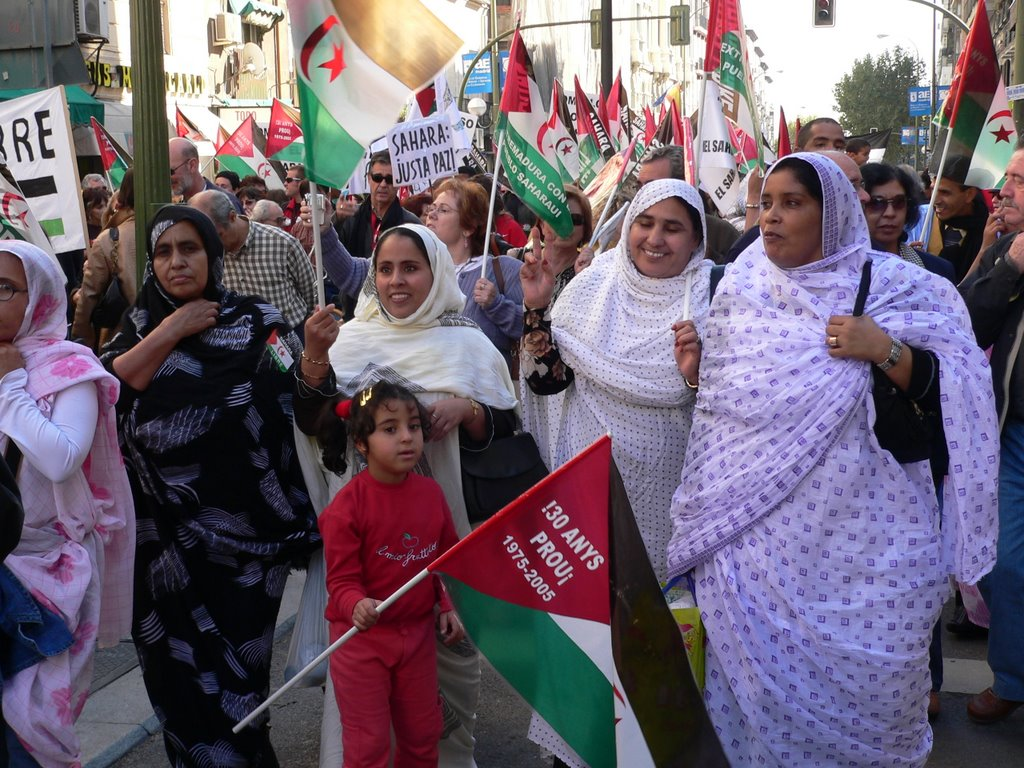
The largely exiled Sahrawi people are now greatly outnumbered by Moroccan settlers. Critics have accused the EU of double standards, citing it blocks certain deals with Israel but not with Morocco, despite both countries violating the Fourth Geneva Convention.

Some Israeli politicians, professor Eugene Kontorovich of Northwestern University and former Israeli ambassador to Canada Alan Baker argue that the European Union (EU) is applying a double standard by blocking deals with Israel that include the settlements in the West Bank and East Jerusalem. They question why the EU imposes these restrictions on Israeli settlements into occupied Palestinian territories but have no such qualms about making deals that include Moroccan settlements in occupied Western Sahara or from Turkish settlements in Northern Cyprus. The settler population in Western Sahara is now believed to outnumber the native Sahrawi population, while the settler population in the West Bank make up around one-fifth of the resident population. The Fourth Geneva Convention states that an occupying power may not transplant its own civilians onto land that it occupies.

Lars Faaborg-Andersen, then EU's ambassador in Tel Aviv, rejects the claim of double standards. He states that the Israeli occupation of the West Bank is a "totally different situations" compared to the Turkish occupation of Cyprus and the Moroccan occupation of Western Sahara. According to Faaborg-Andersen, "the only parallel that exists is the Nagorno-Karabakh conflict", in which the European Union made sure that areas in Azerbaijan that were under Armenian occupation were excluded from any deals with Armenia.

== Limitations ==
Some scholars, such as Jonathan Judaken and Kenneth L. Marcus concede the usefulness of the 3D test either in terms of its mnemonic cleverness in identifying Judaeophobia or as a helpful point of departure for demarcating the unacceptable limits of anti-Israel sentiment. Nonetheless, they consider the test limited for policy usage if applied without considering further development or modification.

== See also ==
- IHRA definition of antisemitism
