= United States v. Pink =

- Supreme Court of the United States

Argued December 15, 1941 Decided February 2, 1942
- Full case name: United States v. Pink, Superintendent of Insurance of State of New York, et al.
- Citations: 315 U.S. 203 (more) 62 S. Ct. 552; 86 L. Ed. 796; 1942 U.S. LEXIS 1060

Case history
- Prior: United States v. Pink, 259 A.D. 871, 871, 20 N.Y.S.2d 665 (App. Div. 1940), affirmed, 284 N.Y. 555, 32 N.E.2d 552 (1940); cert. granted, 313 U.S. 553 (1941).

Holding
- Rights to the property in question passed from the Soviet government to the United States by the Litvinov Assignment.

Court membership
- Chief Justice Harlan F. Stone Associate Justices Owen Roberts · Hugo Black; Stanley F. Reed · Felix Frankfurter; William O. Douglas · Frank Murphy; James F. Byrnes · Robert H. Jackson

Case opinions
- Majority: Douglas, joined by Black, Frankfurter, Murphy, Byrnes
- Concurrence: Frankfurter
- Dissent: Stone, joined by Roberts
- Reed and Jackson took no part in the consideration or decision of the case.

United States v. Pink, 315 U.S. 203 (1942), was a United States Supreme Court decision related to the Litvinov Assignment, wherein the US government recognised Soviet Russia as the successor of the previous Russian government. The United States sued Louis H. Pink, the Superintendent of Insurance of the State of New York, for claims regarding the First Russian Insurance Company.

The First Russian Insurance Company was organized under the former Russian government. The company opened an American branch in New York in 1907. After the Russian Revolution, the Russian government nationalized all insurance companies, including First Russian. The case concerned the return of over $1 million in assets held by the Superintendent of Insurance pursuant to the Litvinov Assignment. New York law granted marshalling preference of the nationalized assets to foreign creditors over American creditors.

The court stated that the action of New York

amounted in substance to a rejection of a part of the policy underlying recognition by this nation of Soviet Russia. Such power is not accorded a State in our constitutional system. ... No state can rewrite our foreign policy to conform to its own domestic policies. Power over external affairs is not shared by the States; it is vested in the national government exclusively.

The court ruled that rights to the property in question passed from the Soviet government to the United States by the Litvinov Assignment.

== See also ==
- Bricker Amendment § Legal background
- List of United States Supreme Court cases, volume 315
