= D3 =

D3, D03, D.III, D III or D-3 may refer to:

== Transportation ==
=== Roads ===
- London Buses route D3, a Transport for London contracted bus route
- D3 motorway (Czech Republic), a motorway in the Czech Republic
- D3 road (Croatia), a state road in Croatia
- D3 motorway (Slovakia), a motorway in northern Slovakia

=== Aircraft ===
- Albatros D.III, a 1916 German biplane fighter aircraft
- Dewoitine D.3, a Dewoitine aircraft
- Dunne D.3, a British Dunne aircraft
- Fokker D.III, a 1916 German single-seat fighter aircraft
- Mercedes D.III, a 1914 German 6-cylinder, liquid-cooled inline aircraft engine
- Phönix D.III, a variant of the Austro-Hungarian First World War Phönix D.I biplane fighter
- Pfalz D.III, a 1917 German fighter aircraft
- Schütte-Lanz D.III, a 1918 German fighter aircraft prototype
- Siemens-Schuckert D.III, a 1917 German prototype single-seat fighter aircraft

=== Automobiles ===
- Ford D3 platform, a full-size car automobile platform
- Peugeot D3, a panel van manufactured from 1950 to 1955

=== Locomotives ===
- Bavarian D III, an 1897 steam locomotive model
- LB&SCR D3 class, an 1893 British 0-4-4 tank locomotive design
- GS&WR Class D3, a Great Southern and Western Railway Irish steam locomotive
- GNR Class D3, which was also classified D3 during LNER ownership
- Pennsylvania Railroad class D3, an 1869 American steam locomotive model

=== Ships ===
- HMS Icarus (D03), a 1936 British Royal Navy destroyer
- HMS Ranee (D03), a 1943 British Royal Navy escort aircraft carrier
- USS D-3 (SS-19), a 1910 US Navy submarine
- D3-class motor torpedo boat, a Soviet motor torpedo boat class
- City of Detroit III (known as "D-III"), a Great Lakes and Detroit River passenger paddle steamer

== Science and technology ==
- Dihedral group of order 6 (D_{3})
- D-brane, a class of p-branes in theoretical physics
- D-3 (video), an uncompressed composite digital video tape format
- Nikon D3, a professional-level digital SLR camera
- Hexamethylcyclotrisiloxane, the threefold oligomer of dimethylsiloxane

=== Biology and medicine ===
- ATC code D03 Preparations for treatment of wounds and ulcers, a subgroup of the Anatomical Therapeutic Chemical Classification System
- Dopamine receptor D_{3}, a human gene
- Vitamin D_{3} (cholecalciferol), a type of Vitamin D
- Melanoma in situ (ICD-10 code: D03)
- Iodothyronine deiodinase type III

=== Computing ===
- d3.js, Data Driven Documents, a JavaScript library for live web graphics based on changing data
- D3, a Pick database sold by Rocket Software
- DOCSIS 3, a cable modem standard
- D3, alternative name for AntiEXE, a boot sector virus

== Entertainment ==
- D3 Digivice, a device from the fictional anime/manga Digimon series
- D3 (Tenchi Muyo! Ryo-Ohki), a character in the anime Tenchi Muyo!
- D3: The Mighty Ducks, the third film in The Mighty Ducks trilogy
- Dedication 3, a Lil' Wayne and Young Money mixtape
- Dhoom 3, a 2013 Indian Hindi-language action film by Vijay Krishna Acharya, third part of the Dhoom film series
- D3 (film), a 2023 Indian Tamil-language crime thriller by Balaaji

=== Video games ===
- Descent 3, a 1999 computer game
- Diablo III, a 2012 action role-playing game PC game by Blizzard Entertainment
- Dirt 3, a 2011 rallying video game
- Disciples III: Renaissance, a 2009 video game
- Disgaea 3, a 2008/2011 game in the Disgaea series
- Doom 3, a 2004 sci-fi horror first-person shooter computer game
- Driver 3, a 2004 racing, shooting, and adventure video game

== Organizations ==
- D3 Publisher, a Japanese video game publisher
- Daallo Airlines, (IATA airline code), an airline based in Dubai

== Other uses ==
- Dublin 3, a Dublin, Ireland postal district
- NCAA Division III, in American collegiate athletics
- USL League One, in American professional soccer, sometimes referred to as USL D3
- d3, a three-sided die in tabletop gaming
- d3, Mieses Opening in chess
- Voiced palato-alveolar affricate (former IPA symbol dʒ), a type of consonantal sound

== See also ==
- King Dedede, a character in the Kirby video game series
- DIII (disambiguation)
- 3D (disambiguation)
- DDD (disambiguation)
- d͡ʒ, the voiced postalveolar affricate in IPA
