= D3 class =

D3 class or Class D3 may refer to:

- D3-class motor torpedo boat
- GNR Class D3, 4-4-0 steam locomotives
- LB&SCR D3 class, 0-4-4T tank locomotives
- Pennsylvania Railroad class D3, 4-4-0 steam locomotives
- Victorian Railways D3 class, 4-6-0 steam locomotives
