= P 4-class torpedo boat =

Motor torpedo boat class of the Soviet Navy

P 4 class torpedo boat
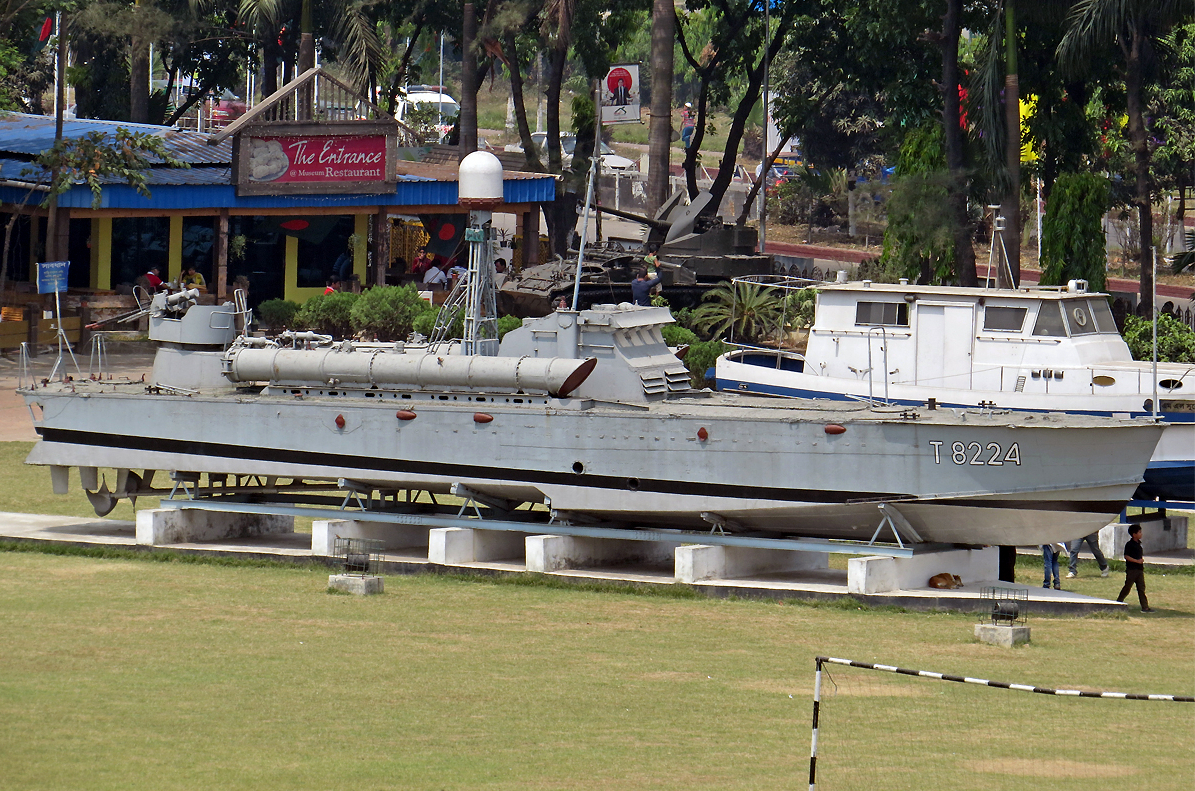
- Decommissioned P 4-class ( Project 123-K ) torpedo boat of the Bangladesh Navy. Preserved at the Bangladesh Military Museum.

Class overview
- Name: Project 123-bis "Komsomolets" torpedo boat; Project 123-K "Komsomolets" torpedo boat
- Builders: Shipyard No.609, Tyumen; Shipyard No.831, Feodosia
- Operators: Soviet Navy; Albanian Naval Force; Bangladesh Navy; Bulgarian Navy; Benin Navy; People's Liberation Army Navy; Cuban Revolutionary Navy; Cyprus Navy; Egyptian Navy; Iraqi Navy; Israeli Navy; Korean People's Navy; Romanian Naval Forces; Syrian Navy; Somali Navy; Tanzania Naval Command; Vietnam People's Navy; Yemeni Navy; Zairian Navy
- Preceded by: D3 class
- Succeeded by: P-6 class
- Built: 1944–1955
- Completed: ~336

General characteristics
- Type: Motor torpedo boat
- Displacement: 22 tonnes (22 long tons)
- Length: 18.70 m (61 ft 4 in) (B-123) 19.26 m (63 ft 2 in) (K-123)
- Beam: 3.40 m (11 ft 2 in)
- Draft: 1.0 m (3 ft 3 in)
- Propulsion: 2 × Soviet M-50 diesel engines, 2,400 hp (1,790 kW), 2 shafts
- Speed: 46–55 knots (85–102 km/h; 53–63 mph)
- Range: 500 nmi (930 km; 580 mi)
- Complement: 7-12
- Sensors & processing systems: 1 × Soviet I band Zarnitsa (Skin Head) navigational radar (K-123 only)
- Armament: 2 × 450 mm (17.7 in) torpedoes; 2 × 2 12.7 mm (0.50 in) DShK heavy machine guns or 1 x 2 14.5 mm (0.57 in) KPV heavy machine guns; 6 × BM-1 depth charges

The P 4-class torpedo boat, Soviet designations Project 123-bis and Project 123-K, commonly called the Komsomolets class (Russian: Комсомолец, a male member of the Komsomol), were Soviet aluminum-hulled torpedo boats. They were armed with twin heavy machine guns and two 450 mm (17.7 in) torpedoes. A large number of them were exported to allied states such as North Vietnam and China. They saw service in a variety of armed conflicts including World War II, the First Taiwan Strait Crisis, the Vietnam War and the Turkish Invasion of Cyprus.

The P 4 torpedo boats consisted of two primary types; the Project 123-bis (B-123) type with 12.7-millimetre (0.50 in) machine guns, and the Project 123-K (K-123) type with added radar and 14.5-millimetre (0.57 in) machine guns.

== Design and development ==
The P 4 torpedo boats were developed from the pre-war prototype Komsomolets torpedo boat (Project 123) in 1942 due to the unsatisfactory performance of the G-5 type motor torpedo boat. The original Project 123 was a single-step, hydroplaning design built from duralumin like the G-5. The prototype was built at the No.194 Marti yard in Leningrad in 1939, and after good test performance it was meant to replace it before the German invasion put a stop to those plans. Compared to the prototype Komsomolets, the new design, called Project 123-bis, had a flush deck hull, and were powered by American-supplied Packard petrol engines instead of the Soviet Mikulin GAM-34.

The armament consisted of two twin 12.7-millimetre (0.50 in) DShK heavy machine guns, two 450 mm torpedo tubes, and six depth charges.

Post-war, the Project 123-bis was identified as one of the more successful Soviet torpedo boat designs and production continued. As American-supplied engines dried up, new boats were built using Soviet M-50 diesel engines. A new variant, Project 123-K, was developed in 1950, with the addition of a radar and a single twin 14.5 mm KPV machine gun replacing the DShKs.

== Service history ==
The first P 4 torpedo boats were delivered to the Soviet Baltic Fleet in 1944. On 11 April 1945, the boats TK-131 and TK-141 attacked and scored a torpedo hit against the German destroyer Z34, though they were unable to sink it.

In 1951, the People's Republic of China purchased 46 P 4 torpedo boats from the Soviet Union, assigning them into four torpedo boat brigades. About 81–90 in total would be purchased from the Soviet Union from 1950–1955. The People's Liberation Army Navy would use them extensively in naval battles with the Republic of China Navy, most notably in 1954 when four P 4 torpedo boats sank the Evarts-class frigate Tai Ping off the Dachen Islands. All Chinese P 4 torpedo boats have been decommissioned, and four were transferred to the Bangladesh Navy in 1983.

Some of the surviving Chinese units were converted into target drones, and thus returned to service, functioning as minor support auxiliaries controlled by converted gunboats.

Twelve P 4 torpedo boats were exported to North Vietnam in 1961. Three of them (T-333, T-336, and T-339) launched an abortive attack on the American Allen M. Sumner-class destroyer USS Maddox on August 2, 1964, starting the Gulf of Tonkin incident.

The vessels T-1 and T-3 of the Cyprus Navy were dispatched to engage the first Turkish flotilla at Operation Atilla as it approached Kyrenia. One vessel was destroyed by air attack, and the other by artillery from Turkish destroyers.

== Variants ==
- Project 123-bis: also known as B-123, original P 4 class torpedo boat design with two twin 12.7 mm (0.50 in) DShK heavy machine guns and Packard petrol engines.
- Project M123-bis: B-123 with Soviet M-50 diesel engines.
- Project 123-K: also known as K-123, P 4 class torpedo boat with 14.5 mm (0.57 in) KPV heavy machine guns and radar, slightly larger than B-123 with a different bridge design.
- Project K123-K: K-123 boats fitted with a A-10bis forward hydrofoil.
- Project 123-U: K-123 boats converted to target ships with remote control systems.
- 2 B-123 boats were fitted with the A-10 and A-11 forward hydrofoil.
- 6 K-123 boats were converted to gunboats, with their torpedoes removed and a second pair of KPV machine guns added.

=== Egyptian variants ===
- Project 123-K with Rocket Launcher: K-123 boat with an eight barrel rocket launcher fitted. One example was captured by Israel.

== Surviving boats ==
- 36 in Baltiysk, Kaliningrad Oblast
- 60 in Komsomolets Torpedo Boat Memorial, St. Petersburg
- 119 "Hero Speedboat" in Phoenix Mountain Camp, Tianjin.
- 123 in Kaliningrad Oblast
- 131 in Victory Museum, Moscow
- 158 "Meritorious Torpedo Boat" in the Military Museum of the Chinese People's Revolution, Beijing.
- 341 in Pamyatnik Geroicheskim Moryakam Chernomortsam, Novorossiysk
- K-12 in Ha'apala and Israeli Navy Museum, Haifa
- T-8224 in Bangladesh Military Museum, Dhaka
- Unidentified in Kaliningrad
- Unidentified in Diorama, Sevastopol
- Unidentified in Katernikov Square, Kronstadt
