= DDD =

DDD or Triple D may refer to:

== Science and medicine ==
- Defined daily dose, a World Health Organization statistical measure of drug use
- Degenerative disc disease, a common disorder of the lower spine
- Dense deposit disease, the preferred name for Membranoproliferative glomerulonephritis Type II
- Dichlorodiphenyldichloroethane, a breakdown product of DDT
- Dual pacing, dual sensing and dual response modes of a pacemaker
- Depersonalization-derealization disorder, a psychiatric disorder involving feelings of oneself or the world being unreal, distant, or detached

== Computers and technology ==
- Data Display Debugger or GNU DDD, a popular graphical user interface for command-line debuggers
- Digital Divide Data, a social enterprise providing disadvantaged youths in Cambodia, Laos and Kenya with IT education and training
- Direct distance dialing, a method for telephone subscribers to call long-distance numbers without operator assistance
- DDD, the SPARS code for a CD that was recorded, mixed, and mastered digitally
- Domain-driven design, a methodology and set of priorities for programming
- Developer! Developer! Developer!, a series of community conferences for software developers
- 3D Systems (DDD), a company that makes devices for stereolithography or 3D printing

== Arts and entertainment ==
- DDD (album), by Poster Children, 2000, named after the SPARS code
- "DDD" (Koda Kumi song), 2005
- "DDD" (EXID song), 2017
- "D.D.D.", a 2019 song by The Boyz
- Diners, Drive-Ins and Dives, an American food TV series
- David Dorfman Dance, an American dance company
- Def Dames Dope, Belgian pop group from 1990s
- King Dedede, a character from Kirby

== Other uses ==
- DDD, a bra size
- Delta Delta Delta, a national collegiate sorority
- Denali Destroyer Dolls, roller derby league based in Wasilla, Alaska
- Dictionary of Deities and Demons in the Bible, an academic reference work
- Destroy Dick December, an Internet challenge and follow-up to No Nut November
- Die-deterioration doubling, a minting error on coins
- Doe Triple-D, a make of tractor
- Dhaalu Airport, Dhaalu Atoll, Maldives, IATA code DDD
- Dongotono language of Southern Sudan, ISO 639-3 language code ddd
- Doomsday device, a hypothetical construction — usually a weapon or weapons system — which could destroy all life on a planet, particularly Earth, or destroy the planet itself, bringing "doomsday", a term used for the end of planet Earth.

== See also ==
- King Dedede, a fictional character in Nintendo's Kirby video-game series
- Di Di Di, an album by Hang on the Box
- 3D (disambiguation)
- D3 (disambiguation)
- DDDD (disambiguation)
