= D3-class motor torpedo boat =

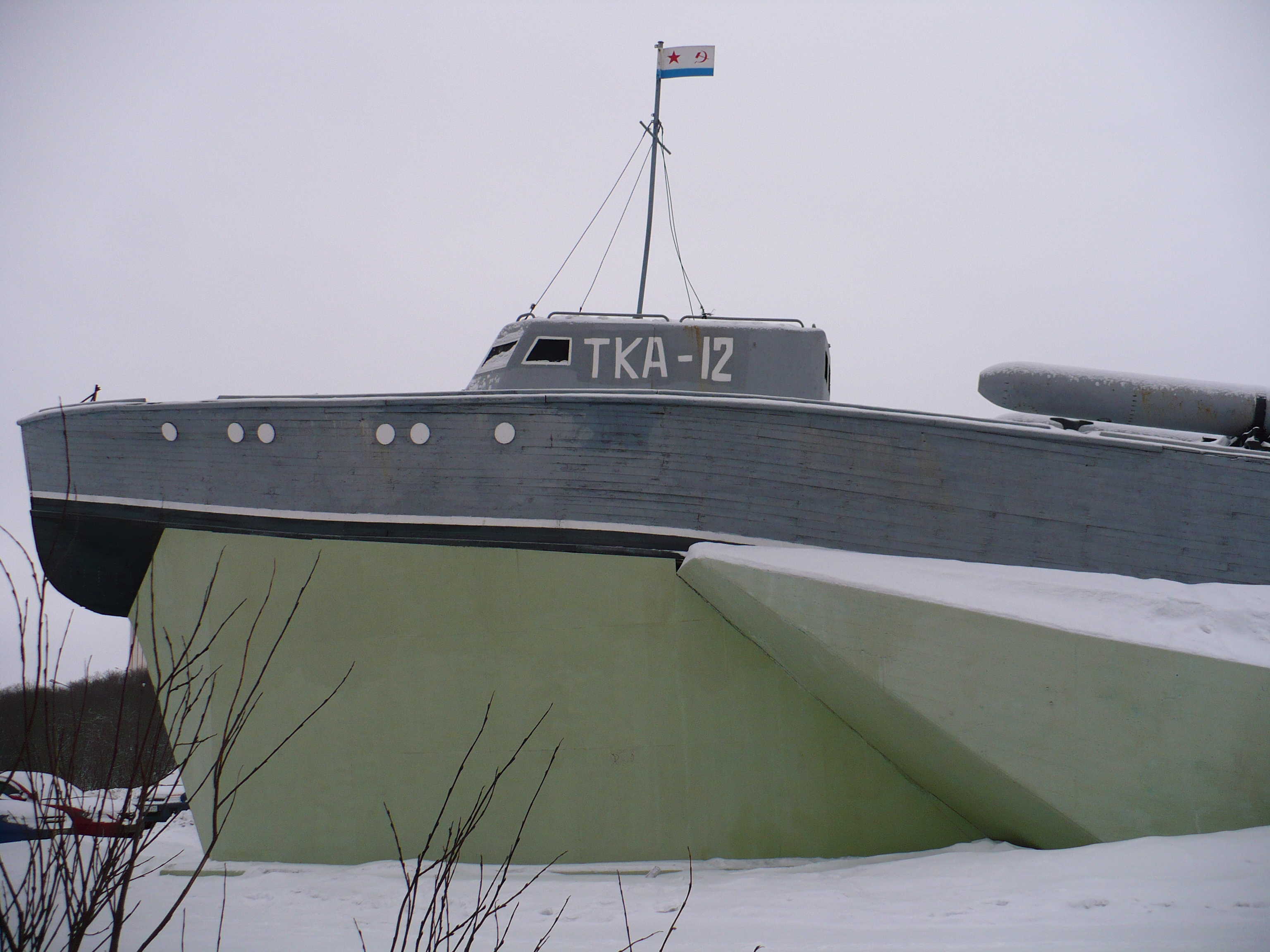
- The D-3-class torpedo boat TKA-12 displayed in Severomorsk

Class overview
- Builders: NKVD Shipyard No.5, Leningrad; Shipyard No.341, Rybinsk; Shipyard No.640, Sosnovka
- Operators: Soviet Navy; Polish Navy; Finnish Navy
- Preceded by: G-5 class
- Succeeded by: Project 123-bis class
- Subclasses: 2
- Built: 1939–1945
- In commission: 1941–1950s
- Completed: 73
- Lost: 28

General characteristics
- Type: Motor torpedo boat
- Displacement: 31 tonnes (31 long tons; 34 short tons) (standard)
- Length: 22.4 m (73 ft 6 in) overall
- Beam: 4.04 m (13 ft 3 in)
- Draught: 1.80 m (5 ft 11 in)
- Propulsion: GAM-34 or GAM-34BS or GAM-34FN petrol engines
- Speed: 32–48 knots (37–55 mph; 59–89 km/h)
- Complement: 9
- Armament: 2 12.7 mm (0.50 in) machine guns later *1 20 mm (0.79 in) or *1 25 mm (0.98 in) and *1 or 2 12.7 mm (0.50 in) *2 × 533 mm (21 in) torpedoes; 4 depth-charges

The D-3-class, designated Project P-19, was a class of Soviet wooden motor torpedo boats (MTB) built before and during World War II. The D stands for Derevyanniy (Russian: Деревянный, wooden).

== Design and development ==
In 1935 the Soviet Navy begun working on larger MTBs that possessed higher endurance than the previous numerous G-5 class. In 1937, the specifications for were issued with 2 designs created, the wooden D-2 and the Steel SM-3. During testing the SM-3 suffered hull cracks at high speeds and the D-2 had poor stability so neither entered production. Nevertheless, both were commissioned into the Black Sea Fleet.

The D-3 was a development of the D-2, with the prototype completed in 1939 and production ordered before trials of the prototype boat had begun. They were originally designed with 3 Mikulan GAM-34FN engines driving 3 shafts, but their unreliability and discontinuation in 1940 meant that the less powerful GAM-34BS engines were equipped instead. This reduced its speed from 48 knots to 32.

The boats were armed with 2 heavy machine guns of various types and 2 533 millimetres (21.0 in) BS-7 torpedo drop collars. Some ships were also fitted with lend-lease 20mm Oerlikon autocannons.

== Production ==
The boats were produced in two main series. The 1941 series with 26 boats built between possessed a noticeable lower speed 32 knots (59 km/h; 37 mph), and the 1943 series with 47 boats built that could reach up to 47–48 knots (87–89 km/h; 54–55 mph) thanks to lend-lease Packard engines. Engine shortages in wartime Leningrad led to some boats fitted with only a single GAM-34BS engine, with the other 2 shafts driven by much weaker ZIS-5 engines. These boats had a maximum speed of about 24 knots (44 km/h; 28 mph), and were converted to patrol boats as they were too slow to use as torpedo boats.

=== Variants ===
In 1942, due to lack of large enemy ships operating in within range of Kronshtadt, the local No.5 Shipyard created the Project P-19-O subchaser, armed with more powerful guns and 16 depth charges, though without submarine detection equipment. This design was modified again into the Project P-19-OK.

Additionally in 1942, the No.5 Shipyard and TsKB-50 design bureau submitted designs for an improved D-3, the Project P-26, with a modified internal layout and extra engines, and Project 158, a steel-hulled version of the D-3. These designs would culminate into Project 200, which was approved in November 1942 with 4 variants planned for production:

- OD-200: Wooden subchaser, entered production
- OM-200: Steel subchaser, cancelled due to lack of available steel
- TD-200: Wooden torpedo boat, prototype completed in 1946 and produced as the TD-200bis (NATO reporting name: P 2-class) using Soviet engines instead of lend-lease ones
- TM-200: Steel torpedo boat, 24 produced

Lastly, another steel torpedo boat based on the original SM-3 design was created in 1943, the STK DD, designated Project 163. It was the first Soviet torpedo boat to use torpedo tubes and M-50 diesel engines, which would be featured in many post-war torpedo boat designs. However it wasn't able to reach its designed speed and only a single prototype was built.

== Service history ==
The majority of the vessels operated in the Baltic Sea. Notably there the Finnish Navy captured the boat TK-52 in October 1941, after she was found grounded due a storm. She was named Vasema and used as motor torpedo boat until 1943 before operating as patrol vessel. She was returned to the Soviet Navy after the Moscow Armistice in 1944. The most notable naval Soviet success of the class was at the Battle of Nerva Island where they sunk the Elbing-class large torpedo boat T31.

In Black Sea the D-3-class was not operated in large numbers, only the original D-3 prototype was active alongside the steel-built SM-3 prototype, later supplemented with the TD-200 and STK DD boats. Both vessels were quite active, sinking the italian midget submarine CB-5 and the German barge F-334 in 1942, while SM-3 sank another barge in 1944 alongside G-5 boats during the Crimean offensive.

In Arctic, the D-3-class boat TKA-12 was successfully led by Aleksandr Shabalin who later become detachment commander of his unit and was decorated twice as Hero of the Soviet Union, this ship would be put on display as a memorial in the city of Severomorsk.

After the war, two vessels were exported to Poland in 1946 and commissioned there as TP-1 and TP-2.
