= Nansha Hospital =

Hospital in Qijin, Kaohsiung, Taiwan

Nansha Hospital 南沙醫院
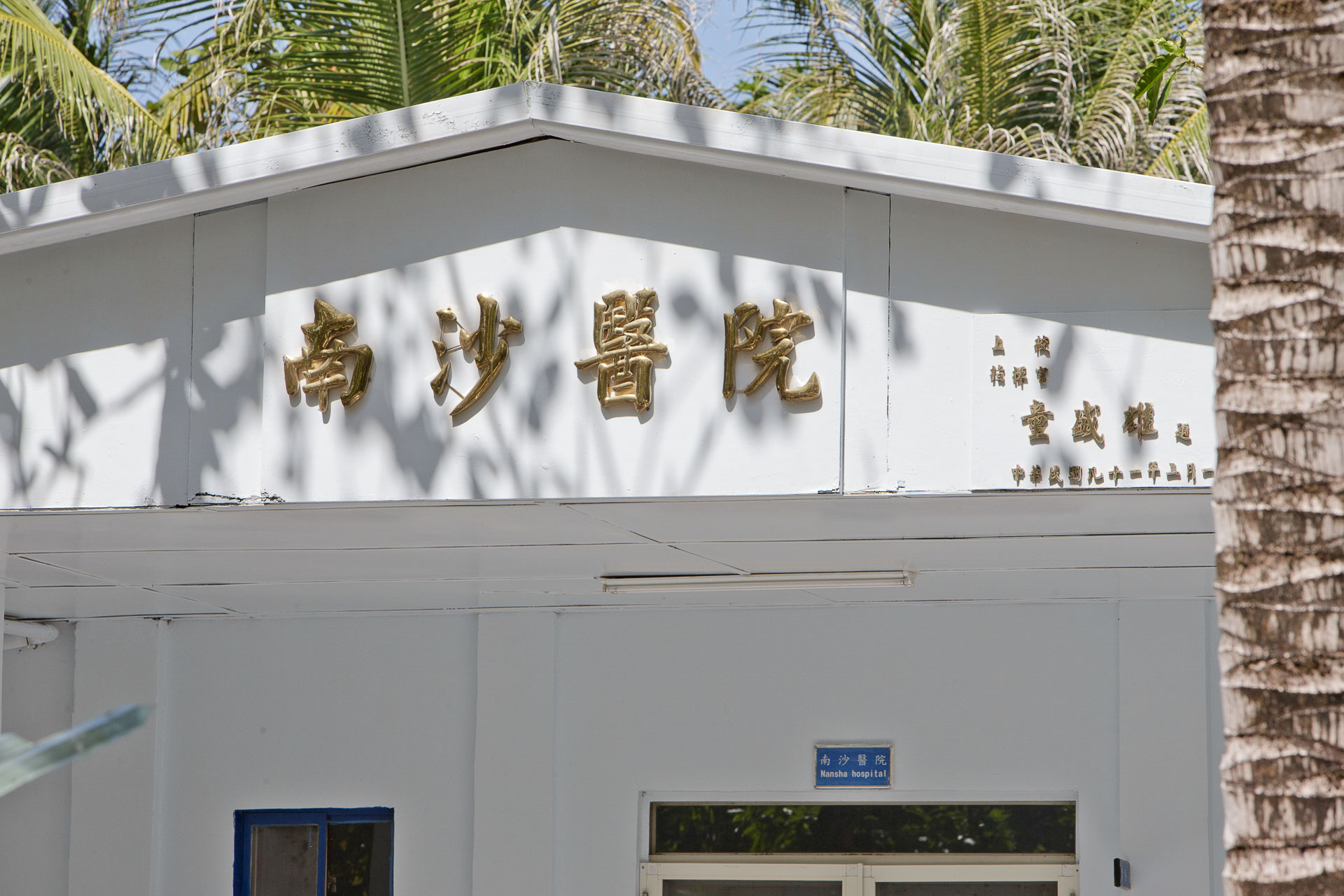

Geography
- Location: Cijin, Kaohsiung, Taiwan
- Coordinates: 10°22′26.6″N 114°21′54.3″E

Organisation
- Type: hospital

Services
- Beds: 10

History
- Founded: 1963

The Nansha Hospital (traditional Chinese: 南沙醫院; simplified Chinese: 南沙医院; pinyin: Nánshā Yīyuàn) is a hospital in Taiping Island, Cijin District, Kaohsiung, Taiwan. It is the only hospital in the island, which provides care for Republic of China Armed Forces stationed in the island and civilians around the island in case of emergency.

== History ==
The hospital was established in 1963.

== Personnel ==
The hospital is staffed by two doctors, a dentist and two nurses.

== Equipment ==
The hospital is equipped with 10 beds and video teleconference to connect it to mainland Kaohsiung.

== See also ==
- List of hospitals in Taiwan
