= Taiping Island =

Disputed island in the South China Sea

Disputed island
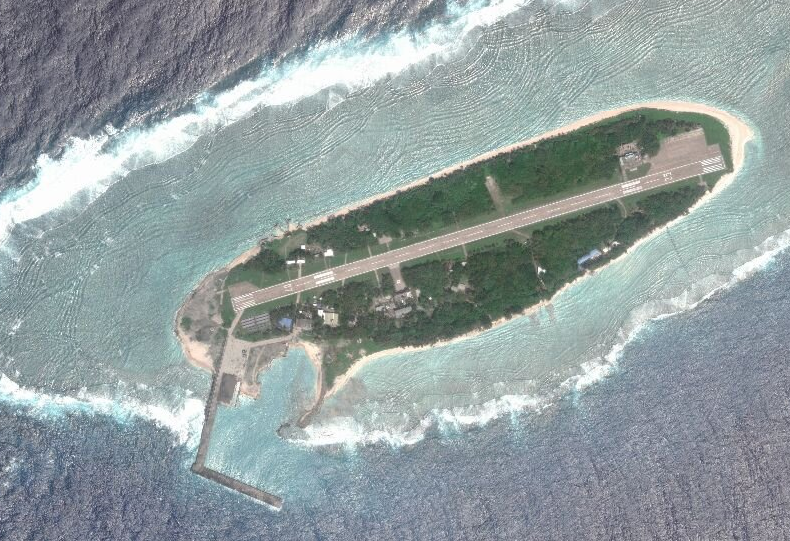
- Taiping Island

- Location within Spratly Islands
- Other names: Itu Aba (Malay) (Note: The feature is designated as ITU ABA ISLAND on NOAA chart K10); Tàipíng Dǎo (太平島/太平岛) (Mandarin Chinese); Ligao Island (Philippine English); Pulo ng Ligaw (Filipino); Đảo Ba Bình (Vietnamese); Huángshānmǎ Jiāo (黃山馬礁/黄山马礁) (Mandarin Chinese); Huángshānmǎ Zhì (黃山馬峙/黄山马峙) (Mandarin Chinese); Nagashima (長島) (Japanese)

Geography
- Location: South China Sea
- Coordinates: 10°22′37″N 114°21′57″E
- Archipelago: Spratly Islands
- Area: 51 ha (130 acres)
- Length: 1,430 m (4690 ft)
- Width: 402 m (1319 ft)

Administration
- Republic of China (Taiwan)
- Municipality District: Kaohsiung; Cijin

Claimed by
- China
- City: Sansha, Hainan
- Philippines
- Municipality: Kalayaan, Palawan
- Republic of China (Taiwan)
- Municipality District: Kaohsiung; Cijin
- Vietnam
- District: Trường Sa, Khánh Hòa

Demographics
- Population: ~200 military, coast guard and support personnel; four civilians

Taiping Island, also known as Itu Aba, and various other names, is the largest of the naturally occurring Spratly Islands in the South China Sea. (Note: Note that from 2014 the PRC embarked on seven major reclamation projects in the Spratly Islands area. It appears that the largest of these are at Subi Reef and Mischief Reef. The reclamation at Fiery Cross Reef is of at least 60 hectares, and according to some unverifiable sources, possibly as large as 150 ha.) The island is elliptical in shape being 1.4 kilometres (0.87 mi) in length and 0.4 kilometres (0.25 mi) in width, with an area of 46 hectares (110 acres). It is located on the northern edge of the Tizard Bank (Zheng He Reefs; 鄭和群礁). The runway of the Taiping Island Airport is easily the most prominent feature on the island, running its entire length.

The island is administered by the Republic of China (Taiwan), as part of Cijin, Kaohsiung. It is also claimed by the People's Republic of China (PRC), the Philippines and Vietnam.

In 2016, in the ruling by an arbitral tribunal in the intergovernmental Permanent Court of Arbitration, in the case brought by the Philippines against China, the tribunal classified Itu Aba as a "rock" under United Nations Convention on the Law of the Sea (UNCLOS) (and therefore not entitled to a 200 nautical mile exclusive economic zone (EEZ) and continental shelf). Both the Republic of China (Taiwan) and People's Republic of China rejected this ruling. According to an article from ASPI, a significant portion of international opinion views Itu Aba as an "island," despite the Tribunal's ruling, and that very few experts expected it to be classified as a "rock".

The adjacent unpopulated Zhongzhou Reef (Ban Than Reef) is also under the control of Taiwan.

== Names ==
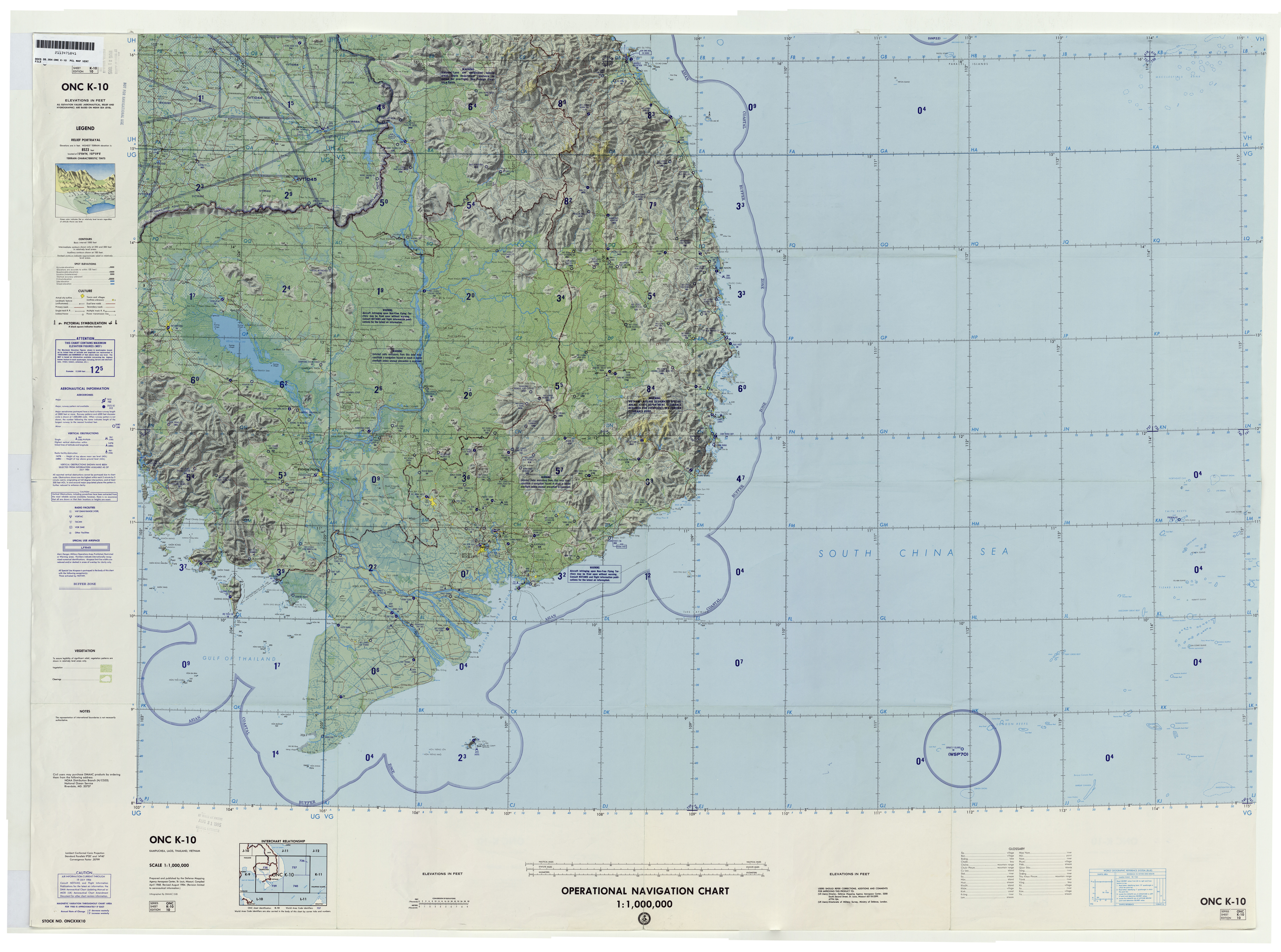
Historical English-language map of the region including the island (labeled as ITU ABA ISLAND) (DMA, 1984)

In 1946, the Republic of China named it Taiping Island (Mandarin Chinese: 太平島; pinyin: Tàipíng Dǎo; lit. 'Very Peaceful Island') in honour of an ROC Navy warship, ROCS Tai-ping (太平號), which sailed to the island when Japan surrendered after the Second World War. The name Taiping Island is used by both the government in Taipei (ROC) and in Beijing (PRC). The island was also called by Hainanese fishermen in their dialect as "Widuabe" (黃山馬), in Mandarin Chinese: 黃山馬礁; pinyin: Huángshānmǎ Jiāo; lit. 'Yellow Mountain Horse Reef' and Chinese: 黃山馬峙; pinyin: Huángshānmǎ Zhì; lit. 'Yellow Mountain Horse Peak'.

Outside of China and Taiwan, a common name for the island is Itu Aba, which was in use prior to 1946. Two different etymological origins have been proposed for this name: that it is a Malay expression meaning "What's that?" (conventionally spelled in Malay: Itu apa?, lit. 'What's that?'); or that it is a corruption of Hainanese: Widuabe (黃山馬). Some Western sources including U.S. government publications continue to use "Itu Aba" as the primary designator of the land feature, often with "Taiping" in parentheses.

The Vietnamese name for the island is Ba Binh (Vietnamese: Đảo Ba Bình, lit. 'calm wave/sea island', chữ Hán: 島波平) and the Philippine English name is Ligao Island (or in Filipino/Tagalog: Pulo ng Ligaw, lit. 'Island of Lost / Wild').

During the Japanese occupation of the island 1939–45, the name Nagashima (長島; Long Island) was used.

== History ==
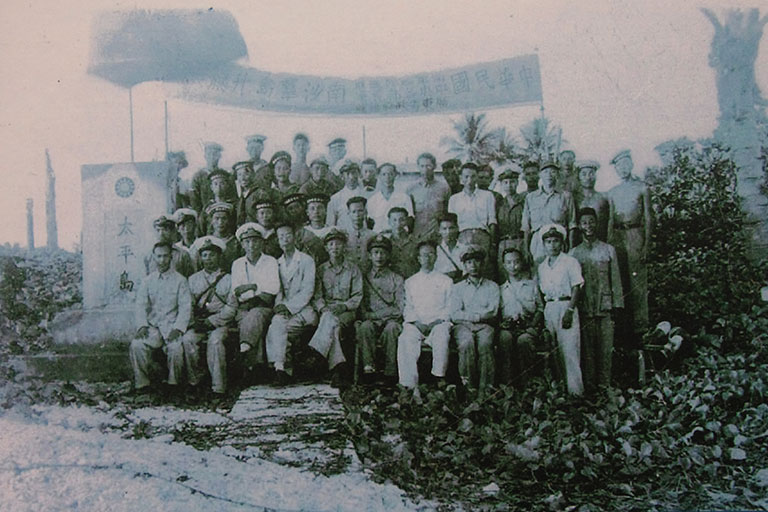
ROC Navy at Itu Aba Island

From before the 1870s the island was used by fishermen from Hainan. They had a semi-permanent settlement. Supplies were shipped from Hainan to the island in exchange for turtle shells.

China first asserted sovereignty in the modern sense to the South China Sea island when it formally objected to France's efforts to incorporate Itu Aba and other islands and rocks into French Indochina during the 1884–1885 Sino-French war. The French conceded the Paracels and Spratly Islands to the Qing government, in exchange for recognition of Vietnam as a French territory.

Sensing the weaknesses of the Republic of China, France formally incorporated the Paracel and Spratly islands into French Indochina in 1932, a year after the Japanese formally invaded northeast China (Manchuria). China and Japan both protested. On 6 April 1933, France seized the Spratlys, formally included them in French Indochina, and built a couple of weather stations on them, but did not disturb the numerous Chinese fishermen it found there. On 3 July 1938, French Indochinese colonial troops also formally occupied the Paracel islands in the name of French Indochina. The following year in March 1939, Japan took both the Paracel and Spratly islands from France, garrisoned them, and built a submarine base on Taiping (太平) Island. In 1941, the Japanese Empire made the Paracel and Spratly islands part of Taiwan, then under its rule.

In 1945, in accordance with the Cairo and Potsdam Declarations and with American help, the armed forces of the Republic of China government at Nanjing accepted the surrender of the Japanese garrisons in Taiwan, including the Paracel and Spratly Islands. Nanjing then declared both archipelagoes to be part of Guangdong Province. It was administratively attached to the municipality of Takao (Kaohsiung) in the Japanese colony of Taiwan. On 6 November 1946, the ROC government sent four warships to the South China Sea to secure islands within the region, commanded by Lin Zun and Yao Ruyu (姚汝鈺): ROCS Chung-Yeh (中業號), ROCS Yung-hsing (永興號), ROCS Tai-ping (太平號) and ROCS Chung-chien (中建號). The warships departed from Guangzhou and headed towards the Spratly and Paracel island groups. On 12 December the two ships led by Lin Zun, ROCS Tai-ping and ROCS Chung-Yeh, arrived at Taiping Island. In commemoration of the island being secured, the island was chosen to be named after the ROCS Tai-ping warship, and thus a stone stele reading "Taiping island" was erected on a breakwater tip southwest of the island. On 3 October 1946, China's leader Chiang Kai-Shek ordered the Navy to send a force to take control of the South China Sea islands: this force left Shanghai on 29 October, arriving at Itu Aba on one and a half months later, after stopping at the Paracel Islands. This expedition was assisted with US naval logistical support. The other three ships likewise had their names used: Woody Island (in the Paracels) was named Yongxing (Yung-hsing) Island (presently PRC-occupied), Triton Island (Paracels) was named Zhongjian (Chung-chien) Island (presently PRC-occupied), and Thitu Island (Spratlys) was named Zhongye (Chung-Yeh) Island (presently Philippines-occupied).

Imperial Japanese forces would not depart from the archipelago until 1946. In July 1949, French naval forces reported encountering both a Chinese Nationalist and a Chinese Communist force garrisoning Itu Aba Island.

After being secured by Nationalist China, the island was placed under the administration of China's Guangdong Province. When the Chinese Communists gained control of mainland China, the defeated Nationalists retreated to Taiwan, but retained control of the Taiping garrison. Japan officially renounced its control and transferred the island to the trusteeship of the Allied Powers within the San Francisco Peace Treaty on September 8, 1951. A different interpretation is that Japan officially renounced its sovereignty and transferred the island to the Republic of China under the provisions of the Taipei Peace Treaty.

In 1952, a Philippine civilian (Tomás Cloma) began to mine sulfur from Taiping Island after claiming it as part of Freedomland and that same year, a note attached to the Treaty of Taipei provided the Nationalist Chinese arguments for sovereignty over the island. The Nationalists established a permanent presence on the island in July 1956.

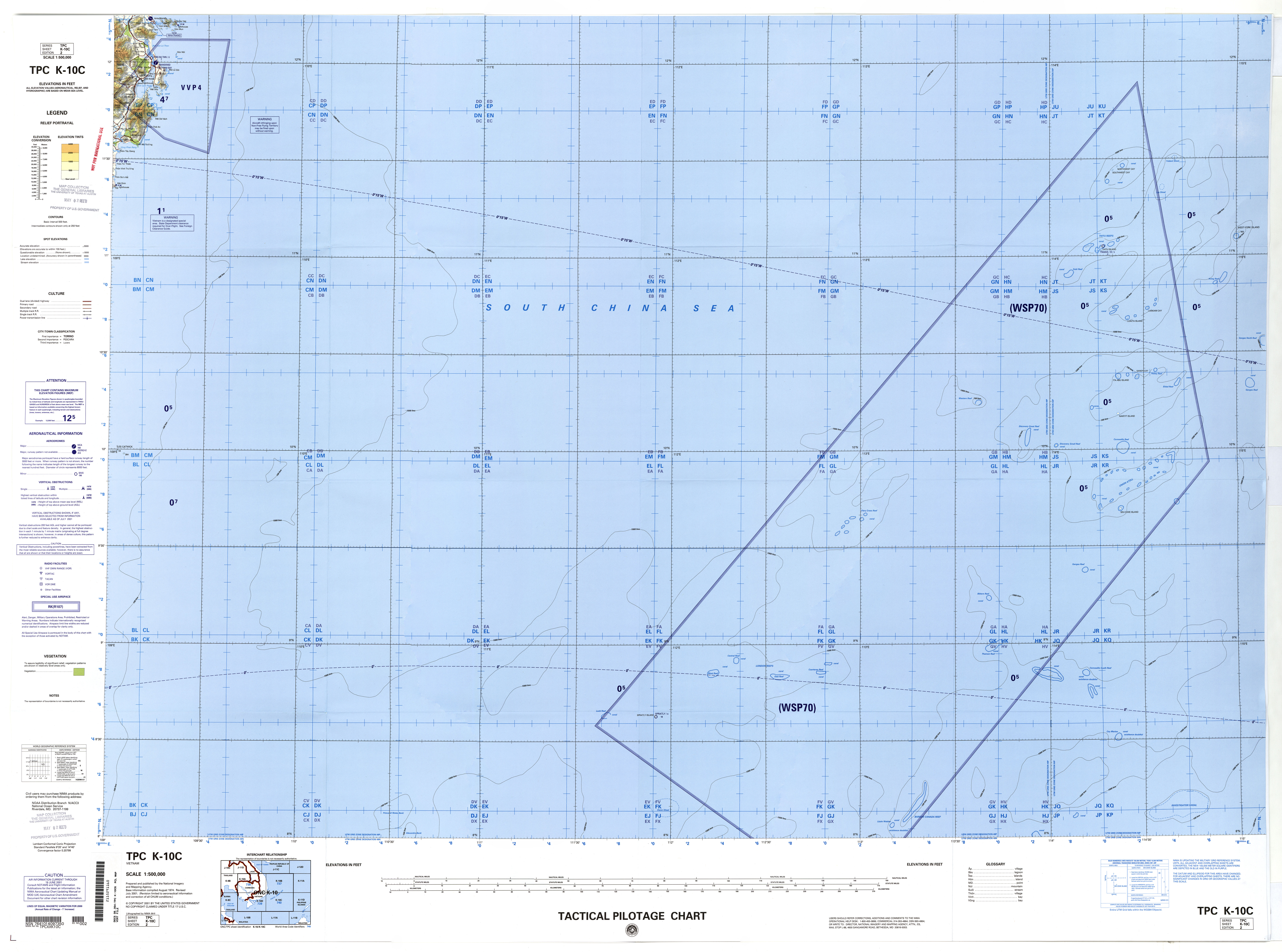
Map of the region including the island (labeled as ITU ABA ISLAND) (NIMA, 2001)

From 2000, a detachment of the ROC Coast Guard Administration was stationed on the island, replacing the Marine Corps detachment. The Taiping Island Airport was completed in December 2007, and a C-130 Hercules transporter airplane first landed on the island on 21 January 2008.

On 2 February 2008, ROC president Chen Shui-bian personally visited the island accompanied by a significant naval force including two fleets with Kidd class destroyer flagships and two submarines. On 19 April 2011, it was announced that the Marine Corps would once again be stationed on the island.

In February 2012, the ROC began construction of an antenna tower and associated facilities with the purpose of providing navigation assistance for aircraft landing. The tower had a planned height of approximately 7 to 8 metres (23 to 26 ft), and was scheduled to be completed in April 2012, and fully functional after proper testing in September 2012. In July 2012, ROC authorities revealed a project which intended to extend the runway by 500 metres (550 yards), which would allow the island to accommodate various kinds of military aircraft.

In late August 2013, the ROC government announced that it would spend US$112 million on upgrading the island's airstrip, and constructing a dock capable of allowing its 3,000-ton Coast Guard cutters to dock, due to be completed by 2016.

On July 12, 2016, a tribunal of the Permanent Court of Arbitration backed the Philippines in an arbitration proceedings against China's "nine-dash line" claim which includes Taiping Island controlled by Taiwan. Both China and Taiwan have strongly rejected the ruling.

== Geography ==
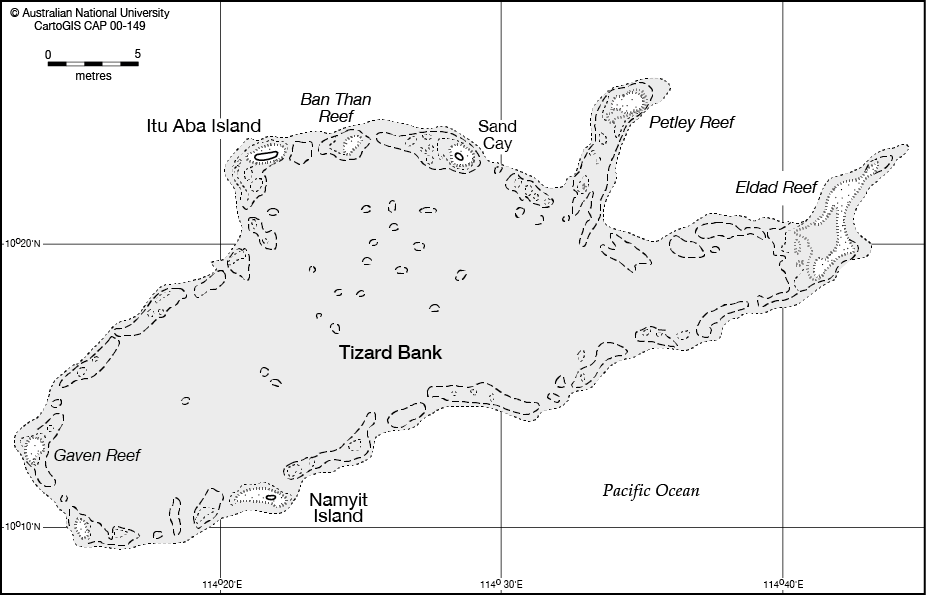

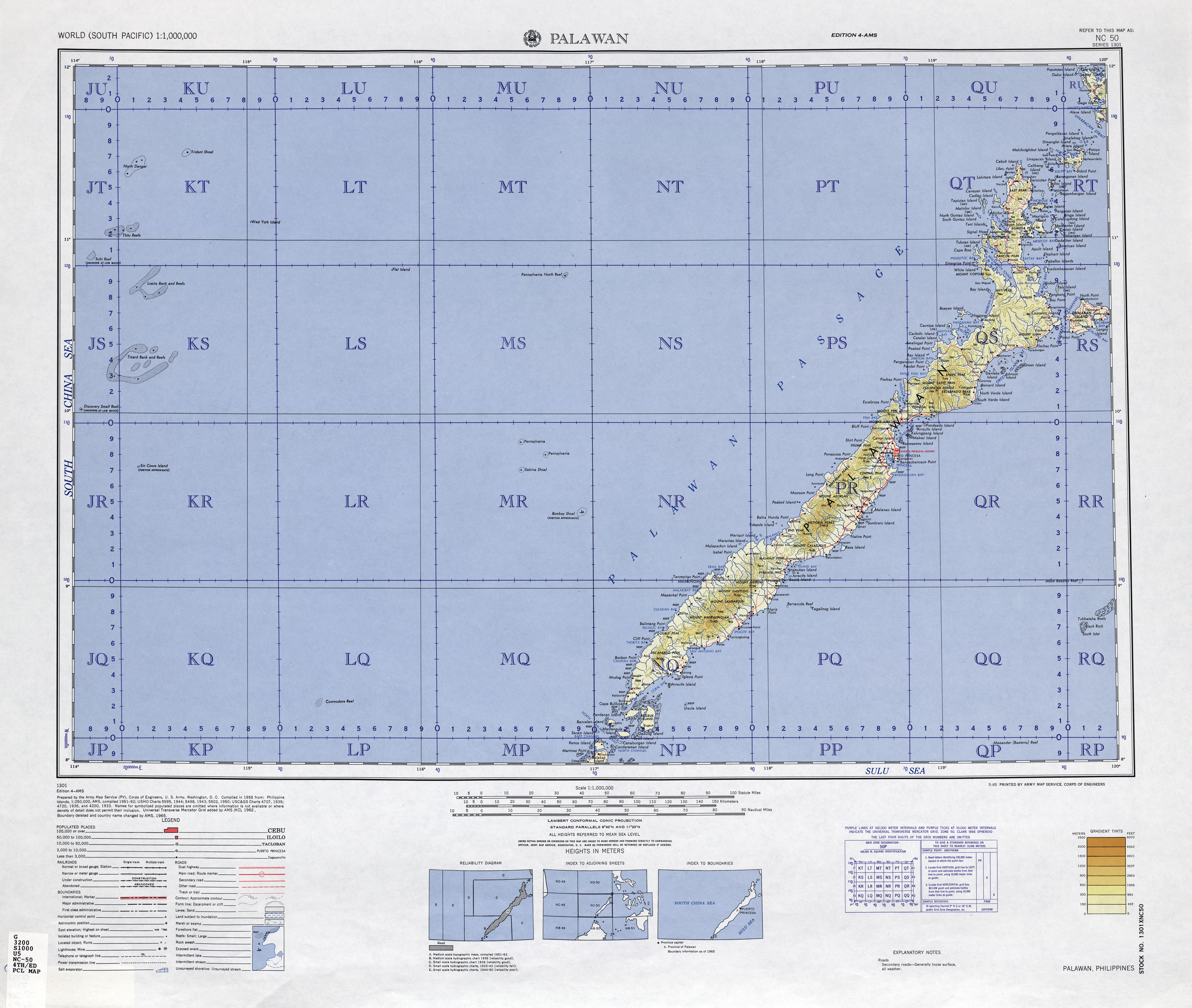
Map including Tizard Bank and Reefs from the International Map of the World (AMS, 1956)

=== Ecology ===
The flora and fauna present on and surrounding the island include swallows, papaya plant, coast oak, terminalia trees, lotus leaf tung tree, goodeniaceae, sea lemon, long stem chrysanthemum, long-saddle rattan, gray grass, coconut tree, banana tree, white-tailed tropicbird, sparrow hawk, tropical fish, jellyfish and various other organisms. The Island is also a nesting ground for green sea turtles migrating from Philippines.

=== Geology and landform ===
The island has a long and narrow shape that is low and flat, that is approximately 1,289.3 metres (1,410.0 yards) long and 365.7 metres (399.9 yards) wide. The area of the north–south coastline is 41.3 hectares (102 acres), and the coastal vegetation line range is 36.6 hectares (90 acres). The mean tidewater over land area is approximately 49 hectares (120 acres), and during low sea tides the water reefs and land area is 98 hectares (240 acres), 4–6 metres (13–20 ft) above sea level.

Since Taiping island is a coral island, the surface includes fine sand and coral reefs formed by weathering. Around the island are sandy beaches, with narrower beaches on the south and north sides 5 metres (16 ft) wide, on the east side 20 metres (66 ft) wide, and on the southwest side 50 metres (160 ft) wide. The sand accumulated on the beach is rosy coloured, mainly formed from red coral fragments and shell debris.

A 523-metre (1,716 ft) long core sample was obtained by the CPC Corporation. The rock layers were estimated to be as old as 780,000 years at the 43-metre (141 ft) mark and over 2 million years past the 130-metre (430 ft) mark.

=== Natural resources ===
The island has historically been mined for phosphates to the point of exhaustion, and today has no major natural resources. There is potentially a large amount of undiscovered reserves of oil and natural gas beneath surrounding waters within the South China Sea Basin, however, there has yet to be formal exploration and mining conducted.

=== Weather ===
Taiping Island has a tropical monsoon climate, with the temperature varying between 21 and 35 degrees Celsius (70 to 90 °F). There is a strong southwest monsoon in summer months in June and July, with strong southwest wind and currents, and during the time typhoons become frequent there is abundant rainfall. The rainy season occurs during November and December.

== Government and politics ==
The island, along with the rest of the Spratlys, is disputed by four countries on historical, geographic, legal and/or technical grounds, in pursuit of fishing rights, shipping lanes, and the potential of petroleum and natural gas beneath the South China Sea. Although it is anticipated that the South China Sea basin is abundant in oil and natural gas, the waters surrounding Taiping Island have yet to be formally surveyed or extracted. Kuomintang legislator Lin Yu-fang has stated that the Chinese Petroleum Corporation has not excluded the option of prospecting territorial waters in the near future, with the military providing naval escort assistance upon directive from the National Security Council of the Republic of China.

Taiping Island is administered under the Municipality of Kaohsiung City, Cijin District, by the Republic of China (Taiwan). Postal service is provided by Chunghwa Post under the assigned area code "819". The Republic of China (Taiwan) military postal service uses the designation "post office branch 68" ("68局") for postage services for the island. The total population of the island is about 600 with no civilians. Land pricing is managed by the Kaohsiung local government, although there have been no cases of actual transactions being made. In 2007, the announced land value adjustments placed the value of the land on Taiping Island at NT$400 per square metre.

Prior to 2012, the ROC coast guard defense forces held 106 mm (4 in) recoilless guns and 81 mm (3 in) mortars to defend the island. These were planned to be replaced by eight sets of 40 mm (2 in) auto-cannons and a number of 120 mm (5 in) mortars by the end of August 2012.

== Facilities ==
Taiping Island has four existing wells. The proportion of fresh water in them is 99.1, 75.8, 97.5, and 96.8 percent, respectively, averaging 92.3 percent. About 65 tonnes (72 short tons) of water can be pumped from these wells daily to provide drinking water and meet cooking and everyday needs. Apart from well water, there are water-retaining facilities mainly used for farming.

Since December 2014, the island has been powered by a 40 kWp photovoltaic power station with a 612 kW storage facility that will generate an estimated 50MWh per year. The project was divided into two phases: the first phase was completed in December 2011; and the second in December 2014. The entire solar power system will generate an estimated 189,492 kWh per year, saving an estimated 49,000 litres (11,000 imp gal; 13,000 US gal) of diesel fuel per year. It was funded by the Ministry of Economic Affairs.

The Taiping Island Airport features an airstrip which caters for C-130 transport planes of the ROC Air Force, with one sortie arriving every two months. No re-fueling facilities are available. Depending on sources, the runway is either 1150 or 1200 metres (approx. 1300 yards) long, 30 metres (98 ft) wide, and has a large hard-standing area capable of accommodating two C-130 aircraft. The island also has a helicopter platform.

Additional facilities located on the island include a shelter for fishermen, a hospital (including a civilian doctor), satellite telecommunications facilities, radar surveillance equipment, and other communications equipment. Five public telephones are connected via satellite. The island also has Internet connectivity. Mobile phone reception is available for individuals with international roaming; a signal from China Mobile can be accessed from a GSM base station located on PRC-occupied Nanxun Reef. In 2013, Taiwan's Chunghwa Telecom established a satellite-based cellular base station on the island to provide the coast guard with communication services.

The ROC maintains a large meteorological station on Taiping island. The station collects weather information using surface instruments, launching weather balloons daily. The ROC Central Weather Bureau has an employee presence on the island.

Guanyin Temple, built in 1959, and nearby tombstones dating back to the Qing dynasty (which lasted until 1911) can show traces of Chinese activity on the island.

== Coast guard ==
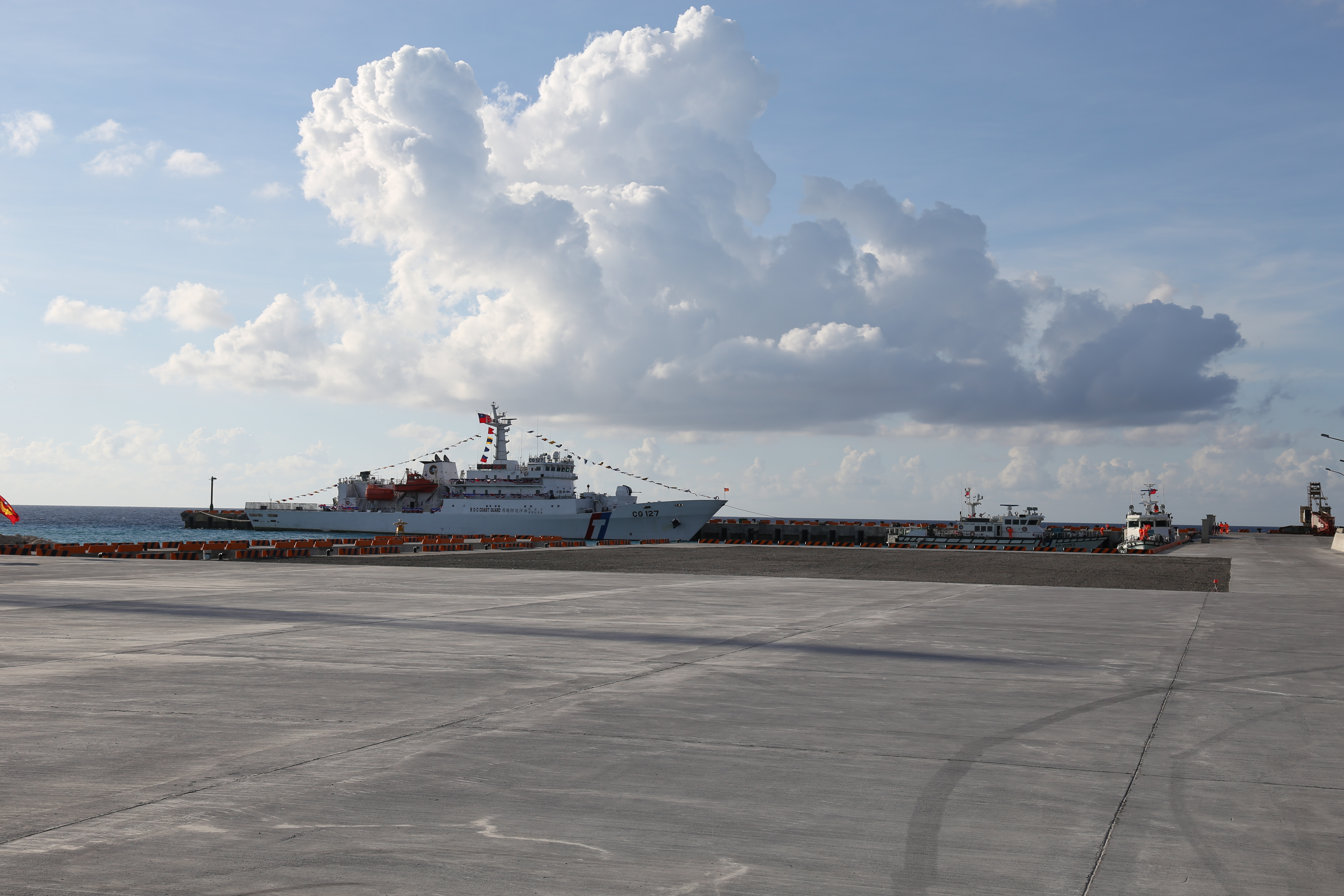
Taiping Island Pier, 2015.

Three Coast Guard Administration boats of the Type M8 speedboat, designated Nanhai 4, Nanhai 5, and Nanhai 6 (Chinese: 南海四號, 南海五號, 南海六號, "Nanhai" literally translates to "South Sea" or "South China Sea"), respectively, are prepared to patrol the island but are not considered sufficient to adequately monitor the island's surroundings. Bridge piers were constructed in 1992 but some had been damaged. In December 2006, rebuilding began on a damaged L-shaped pier, the Southern Star Ferry Pier (Chinese: 南星碼頭), in order to improve the transportation and supply of materials for the Coast Guard. Currently, as of 2017, a military supply ship services the island during a single voyage in April and November each year, anchoring for one day to deliver personnel and military supplies. Additionally, a civil merchantman arrives with general goods every 20 days, anchoring for 1 to 2 days at a time. This ship may be used as a transport for the stationed coast guard personnel.

== Tourist attractions ==
A temple on the island exists as a common visiting place. The southeast side of the island contains old Japanese constructions. The "Taiping Cultural Park" (Chinese: 太平文化公園) is located near the pier. There is also a pillar erected on the island that declares Taiping Island as a territory of the Republic of China.

== Sister cities ==
The following are sister cities with Taiping Island:

- (United States) Lincoln, Nebraska

== See also ==
- Pratas Island (Tungsha, Dongsha)
- List of islands of Taiwan
- List of maritime features in the Spratly Islands
- South China Sea Islands
- Taiping Island Airport
- Zhongzhou Reef
- List of Taiwanese superlatives
