= KPV heavy machine gun =

Heavy machine gun

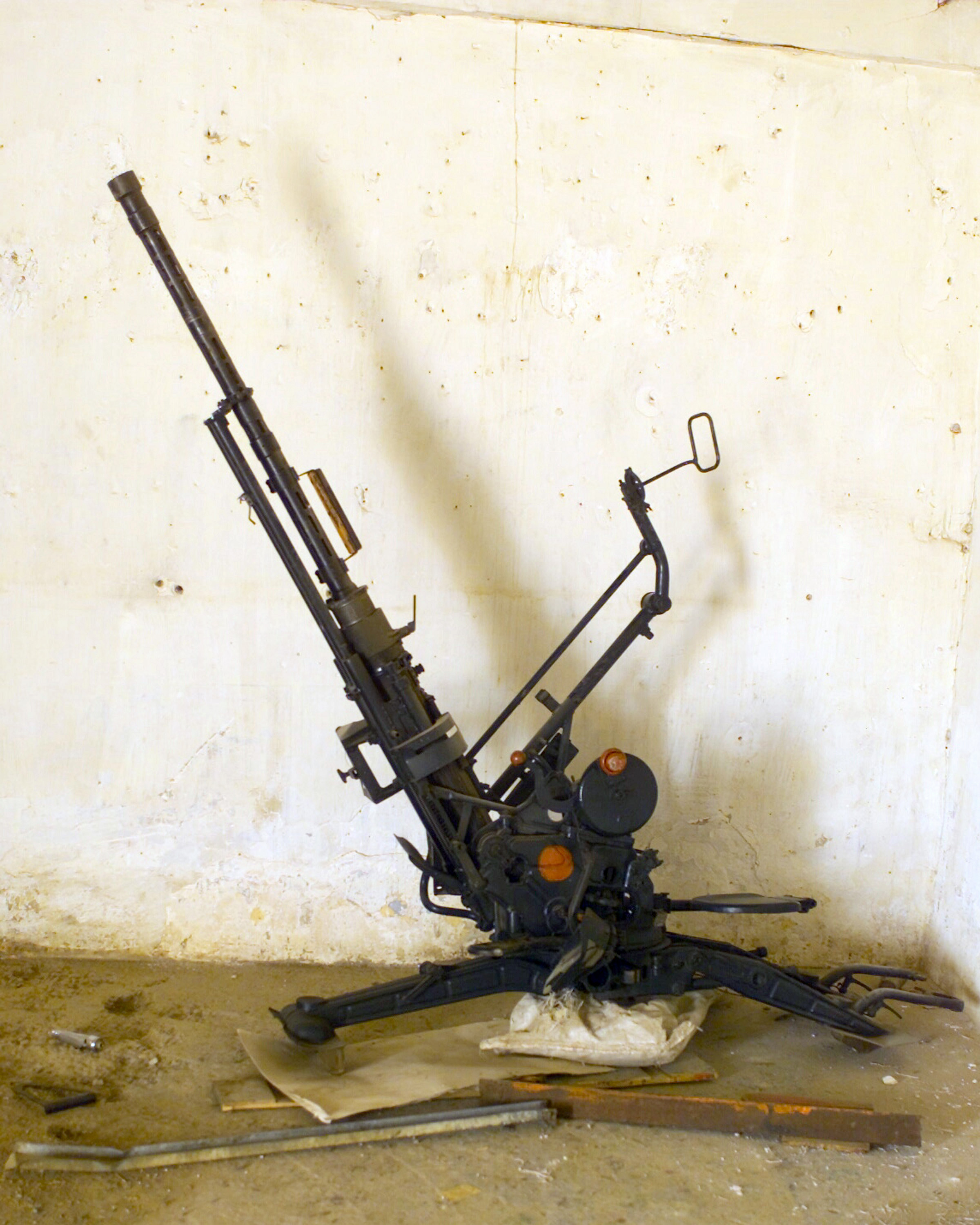
- KPV as used in ZGU-1 mountain anti-aircraft mount
- Type: Heavy machine gun
- Place of origin: Soviet Union

Service history
- In service: 1949–present
- Used by: See operators
- Wars: Korean War; Vietnam War; Laotian Civil War; Cambodian Civil War; Rhodesian Bush War; Western Sahara War; Angolan Civil War; South African Border War; Soviet–Afghan War; Chadian-Libyan War; Iran–Iraq War; Gulf War; First Chechen War; Second Chechen War; Russo-Georgian War; Iraq War; Lebanese Civil War; First Libyan Civil War; Syrian Civil War; War in Iraq (2013–2017); Russo-Ukrainian War; Second Libyan Civil War; Yemeni Civil War (2014–present); Saudi Arabian-led intervention in Yemen; Saudi–Yemeni border conflict (2015–present)

Production history
- Designer: Semyon Vladimirov
- Designed: 1944
- Manufacturer: Degtyarev Plant
- Produced: 1949–present
- Variants: KPVT

Specifications
- Mass: 49 kg (108.03 lb)
- Length: 1,980 mm (78.0 in)
- Barrel length: 1,346 mm (53.0 in)
- Width: 162 mm (6.4 in)
- Height: 225 mm (8.9 in)
- Cartridge: 14.5×114mm
- Caliber: 14.5 mm
- Action: Short recoil operation
- Rate of fire: 600 rpm
- Muzzle velocity: 1,005 m/s (3,297 ft/s)
- Effective firing range: 3,000 m (9,800 ft)
- Maximum firing range: 4,000 m (13,000 ft)
- Feed system: 40-round belt
- Sights: iron or optical

The KPV heavy machine gun (Russian: КПВ, romanized: KPV, an initialism for Крупнокалиберный пулемёт Владимирова, Krupnokaliberny pulemyot Vladimirova, 'Vladimirov's Large-Caliber Machine Gun') is a Soviet designed 14.5×114mm-caliber heavy machine gun, which first entered service as an infantry weapon in 1949. In the 1960s, the infantry version was taken out of production because it was too large and heavy. It was later redesigned for anti-aircraft use, as it showed excellent results as an AA gun against low flying aircraft, with a range of 3,000 m (9,800 ft) horizontally and 2,000 m (6,600 ft) vertically. It was used in the ZPU series of anti-aircraft guns. Its size and power also made it a useful light anti-armour weapon on the BTR series of vehicles and the BRDM-2 scout car.

== Mechanics ==
The KPV was a heavy machine gun developed by S. V. Vladimirov. It was developed in 1944 and adopted in 1949. It combines the rate of fire of a heavy machine gun with the armor-piercing capabilities of antitank rifles and was designed to combat lightly armored targets, firepower and manpower of the enemy located behind light cover, as well as to be an anti-aircraft machine gun. The muzzle energy of the KPV reaches 31 kJ. For comparison, the 12.7 mm Browning M2HB machine gun has up to 19 kJ (14,000 ft⋅lbf) with a 660 gr (43 g) bullet traveling at 3,080 ft/s (940 m/s) manufactured by PMC, the 20 mm ShVAK aircraft mounted gun has about 28 kJ (21,000 ft⋅lbf). It is one of the most powerful machine guns ever used by the Soviet and later Russian armed forces. The development of the machine gun began in 1944. The 14.5×114mm M41 cartridge can be used with high explosive incendiary - tracer (HEI-T) or armor-piercing incendiary (API) bullets. The KPV is air-cooled and fitted with a barrel with a hard chrome plated bore. It uses a short recoil operation system with gas assistance and a rotary bolt. It can be fed with the 40-round metallic belt from either the left or right side. The barrel can be removed by turning the prominent latch on the forward end of the receiver and pulling on the barrel's carrying handle.

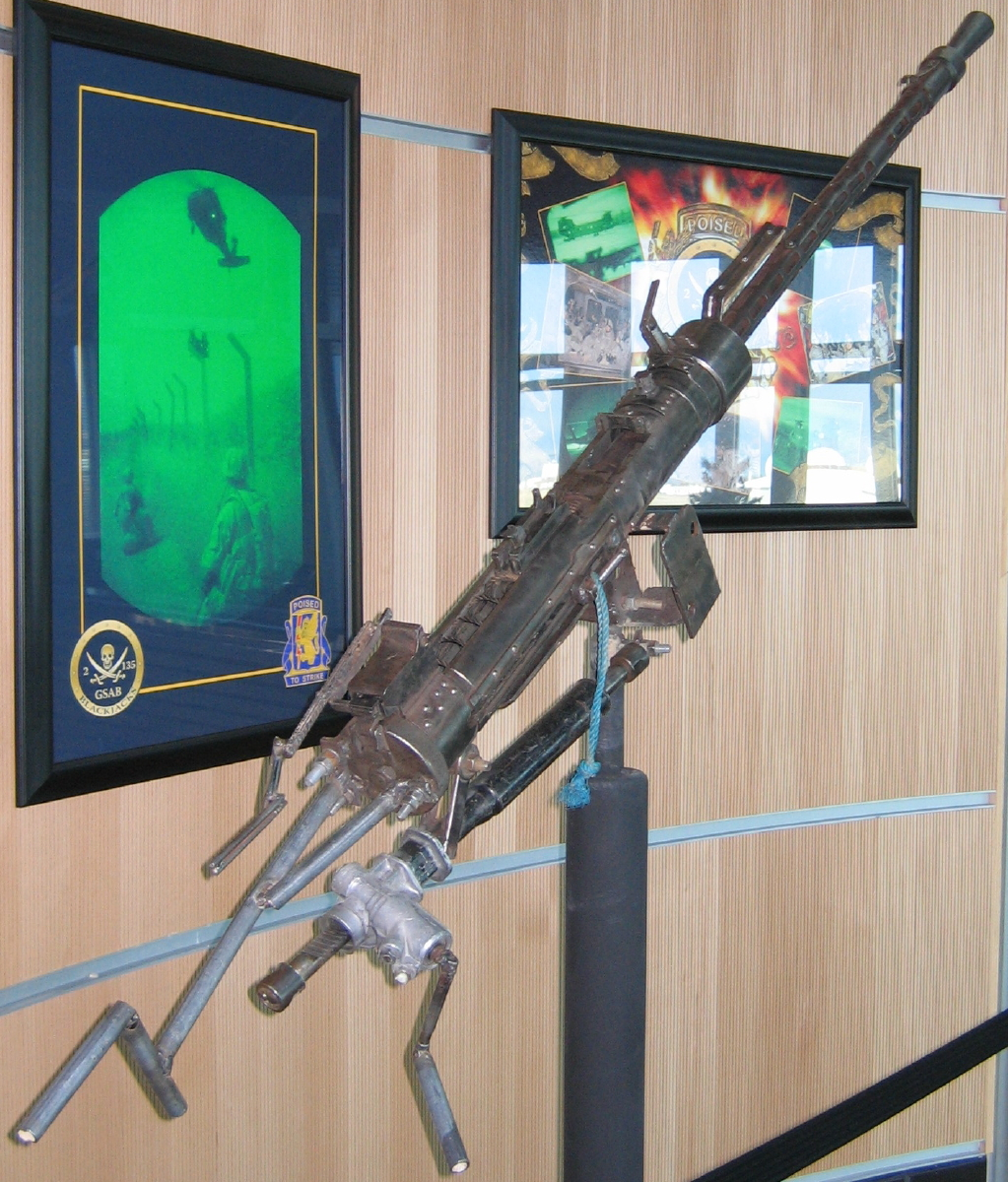
Rear view of a captured KPV machine-gun crudely modified for use as an anti-aircraft weapon on display at the headquarters of the 2-135 General Support Aviation Battalion at Buckley Space Force Base, Colorado. It is missing its feed tray cover and entire upper receiver.

== Versions ==
=== KPVT ===
The version for use in armored vehicles is called the KPVT (Russian: КПВ танковый, romanized: KPV tankovy, lit. 'Tank-Mounted KPV'). KPVT is used for armored vehicle installations, boats, movable and stationary mounts and various antiaircraft mounts. It features a shorter receiver and a heavier barrel jacket. The KPVT also uses a 50-round belt instead of the original 40-round belt. KPVTs are the primary armament of the wheeled BTR-60PB/70/80 series armored personnel carriers and BRDM-2 armored reconnaissance vehicles. It is intended for fighting against lightly armored targets, weapons systems and light shelters at the distances of up to 3,000 m (9,800 ft), as well as air targets at distances up to 2,000 m (6,600 ft).

The distance at which the bullet retains lethal force is 8 km (5.0 mi). The maximum flight range of the bullet is 9 km (5.6 mi).

=== Naval armament ===
The naval twin mount had several versions:

- 2M-5 was for motor torpedo boats.
- 2M-6 was a machine gun turret for armored gunboats.
- 2M-7 was for patrol and mine sweeping boats.

The single mount was called the "14.5 mm MTPU" (Russian: 14,5-мм МТПУ, an initialism for 14,5-мм морская тумбовая пулемётная установка, '14.5 mm Naval Machine Gun Column Mount'). The 14.5 mm MTPU is intended for combat against armored surface, coast and air targets. It is mounted on decks of boats and can defeat surface and coast targets with a range of 3,000 m (9,800 ft) horizontally and 2,000 m (6,600 ft) vertically against low flying planes.

=== ZPU ===
The ZPU (Russian: ЗПУ, an initialism for Зенитная пулемётная установка, 'Anti-Aircraft Machine Gun Mount') is a towed anti-aircraft gun based on the KPV. It entered service with the Soviet Union in 1949 and is used by over 50 countries worldwide.

- ZPU-1 single-barreled mount.
- ZPU-2 twin-barreled mount.
- ZPU-4 quadruple-barreled mount.

==== Mountain version ====
- ZGU-1 single-barreled pack mount (Russian: ЗГУ, romanized: ZGU, an initialism for Зенитная горная установка, 'Mountain Anti-Aircraft Mount').

== Remote weapon stations ==
The Emirati remote weapon station IGG-RWS14 uses the KPV machine gun.

== Gallery ==
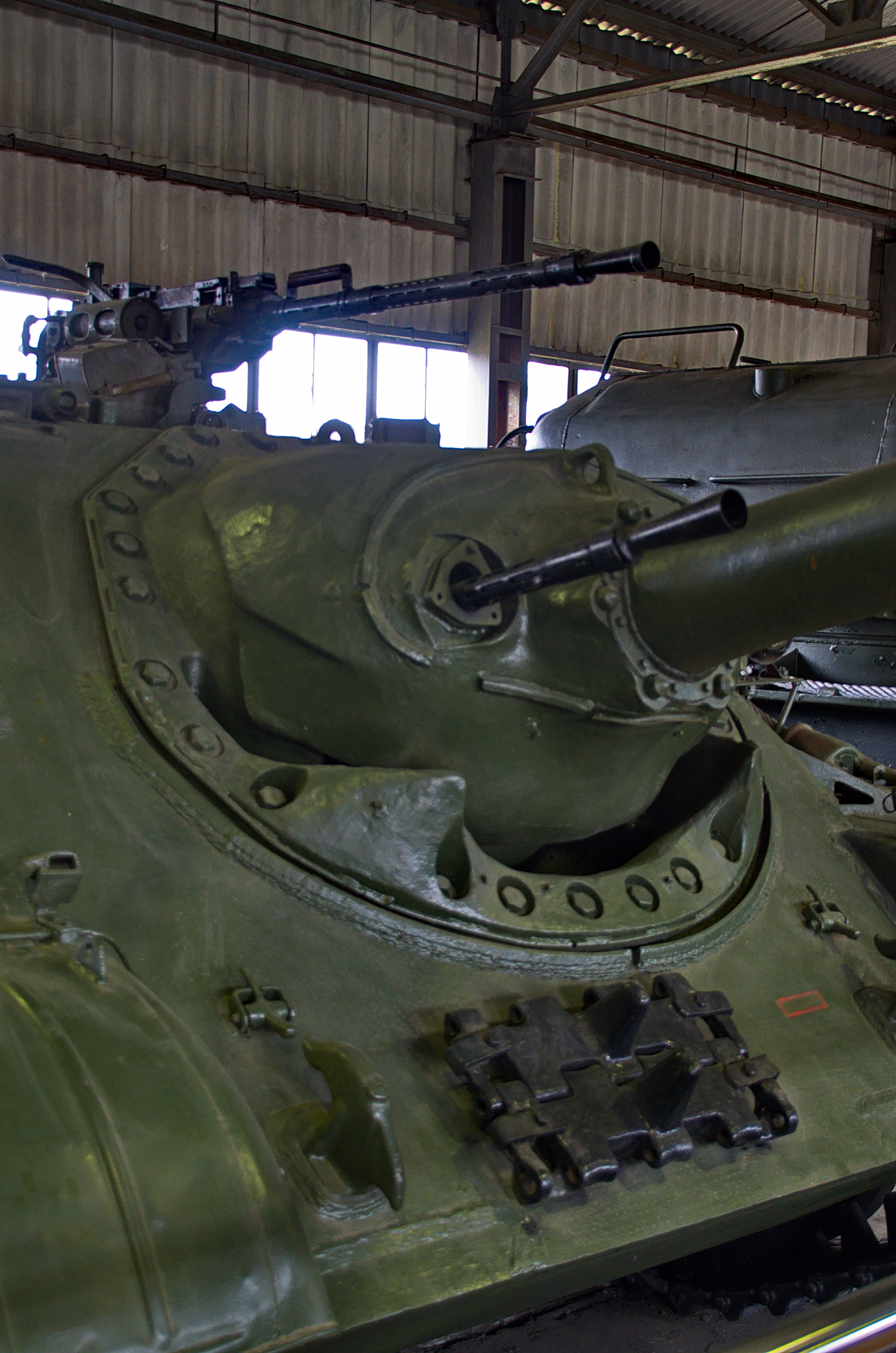
SU-122-54 with a KPVT mounted on top of the hull and another in a coaxial mounting next to the main cannon

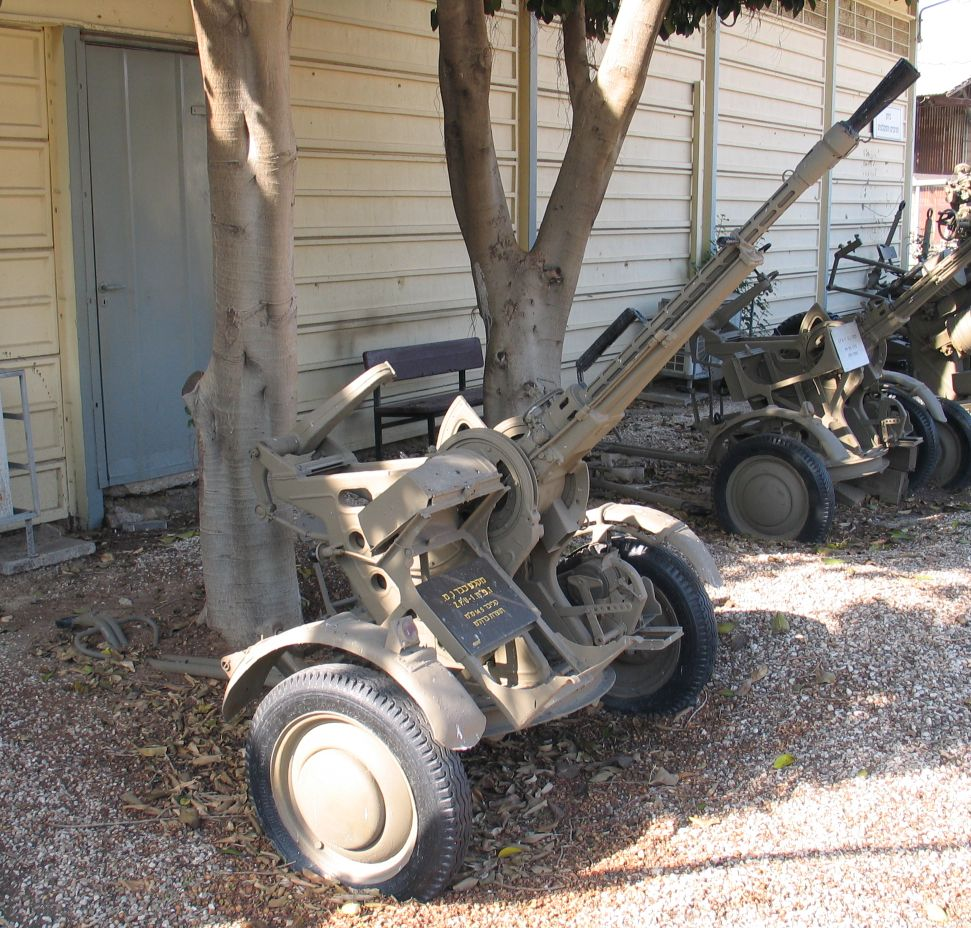
ZPU-1 single-barreled AA mount

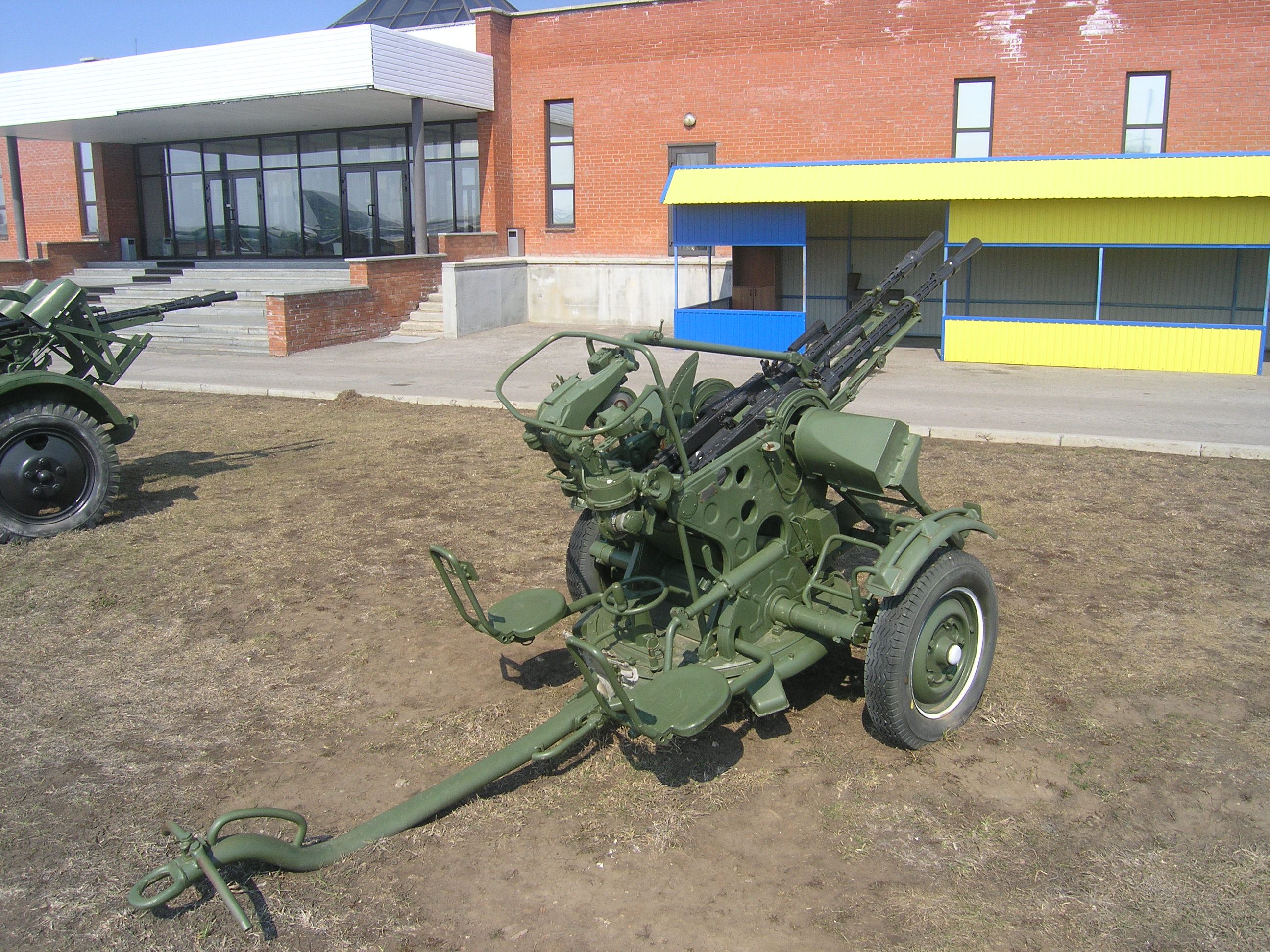
ZPU-2 twin-barreled AA mount

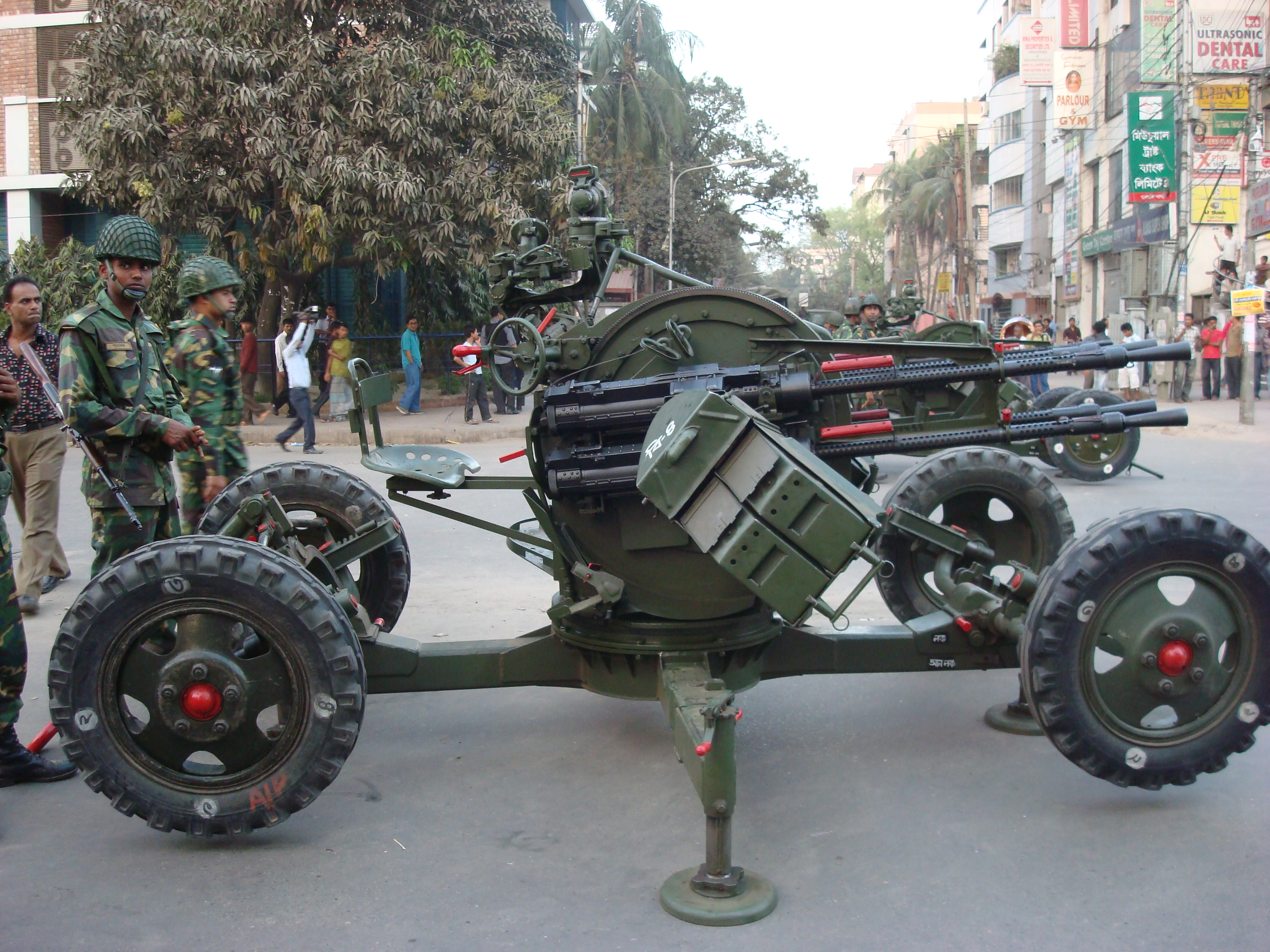
Bangladesh Army ZPU-4 quadruple-barreled AA mount

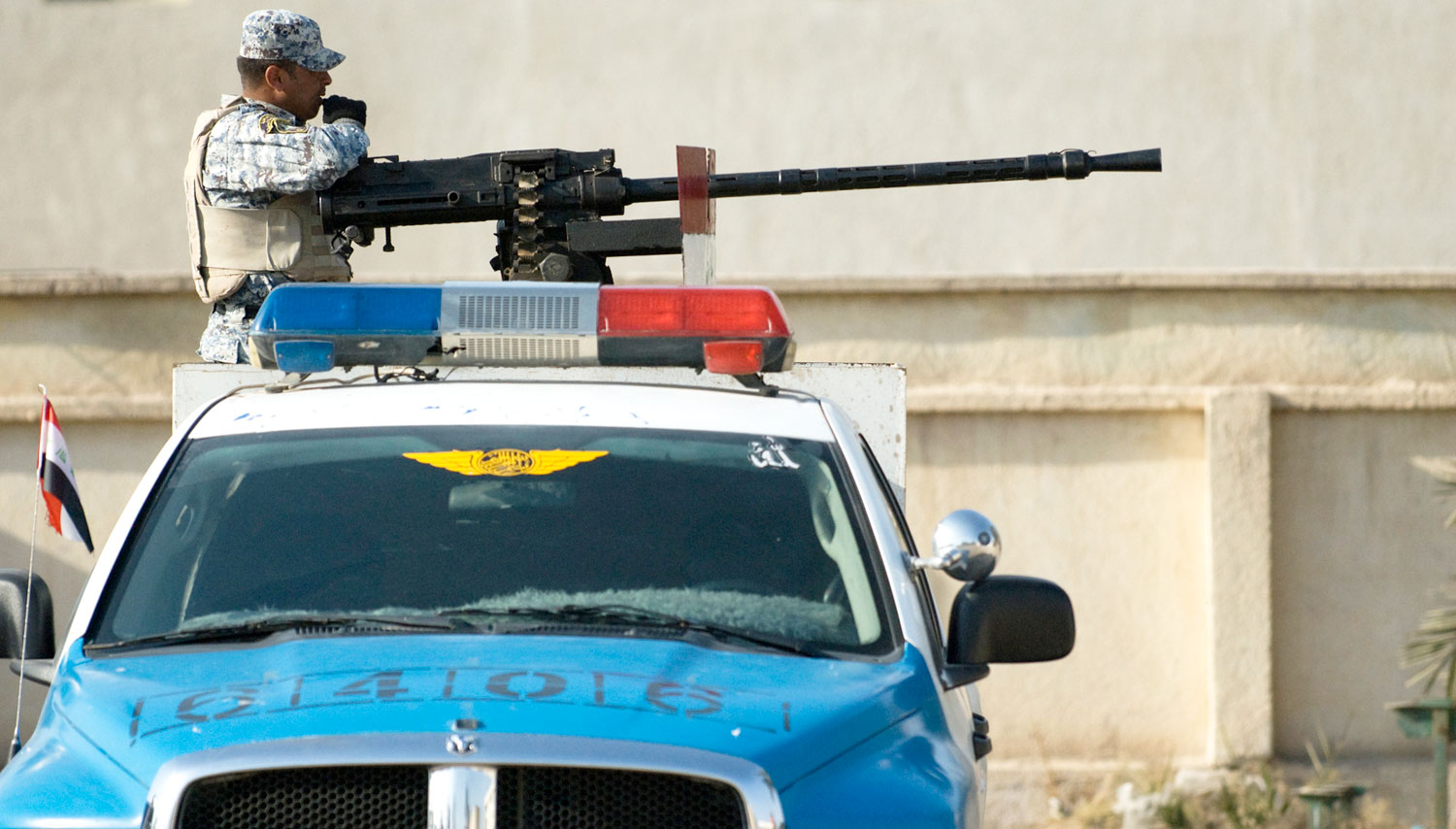
Iraq Police Dodge Ram gun truck with adapted KPV

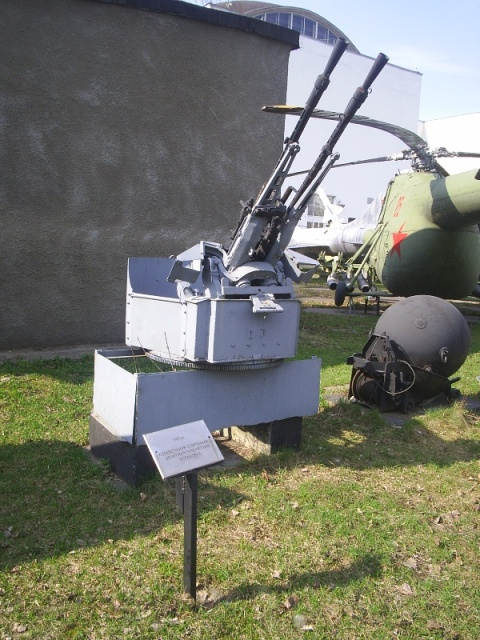
2M-5 naval machine gun mount

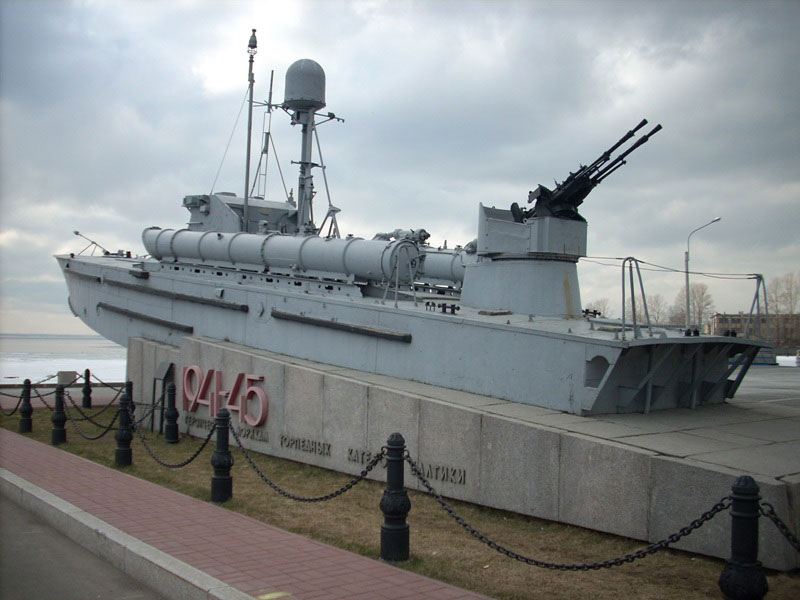
2M-5 naval machine gun mount on a P 4-class torpedo boat

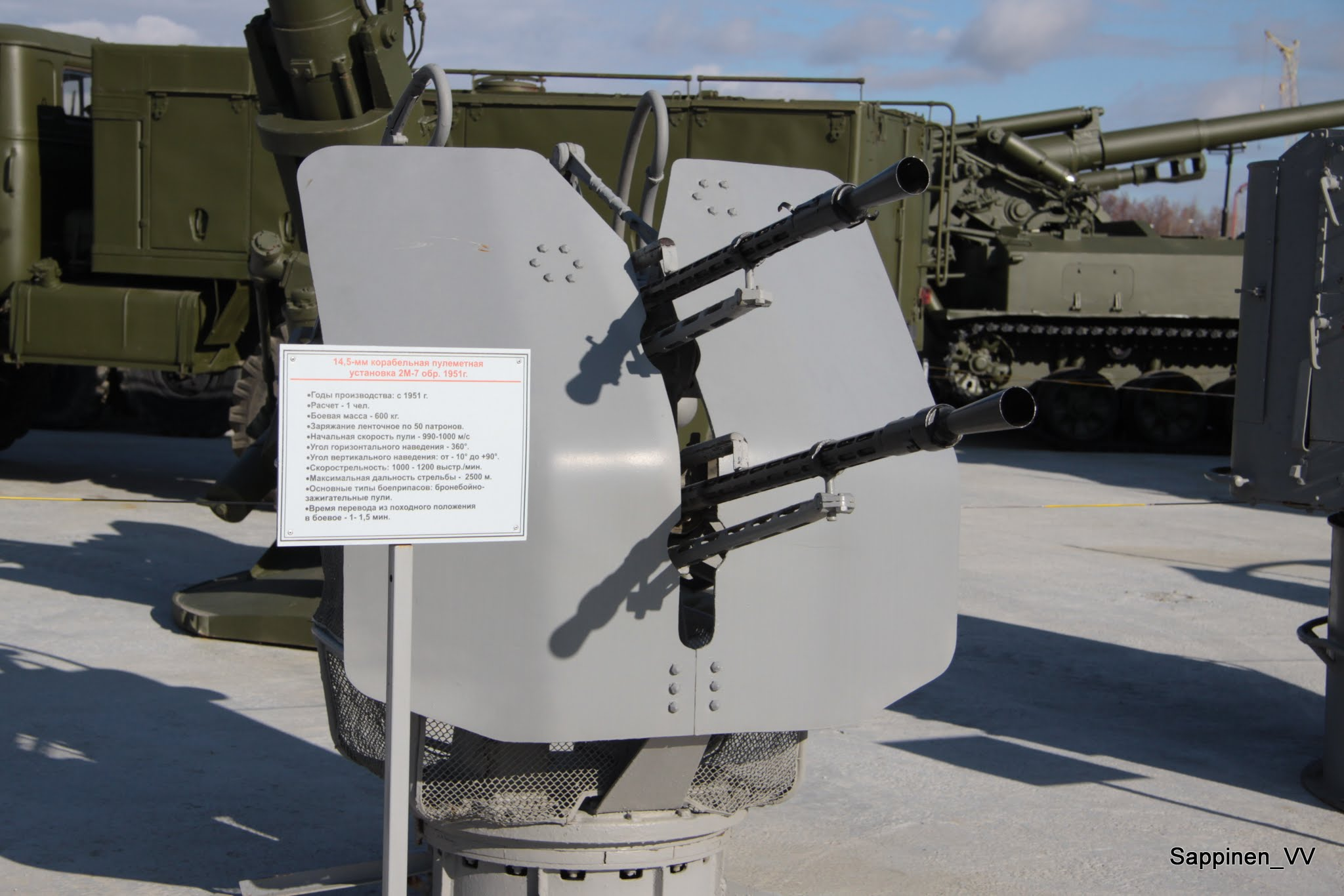
2M-7 naval machine gun mount (front view)

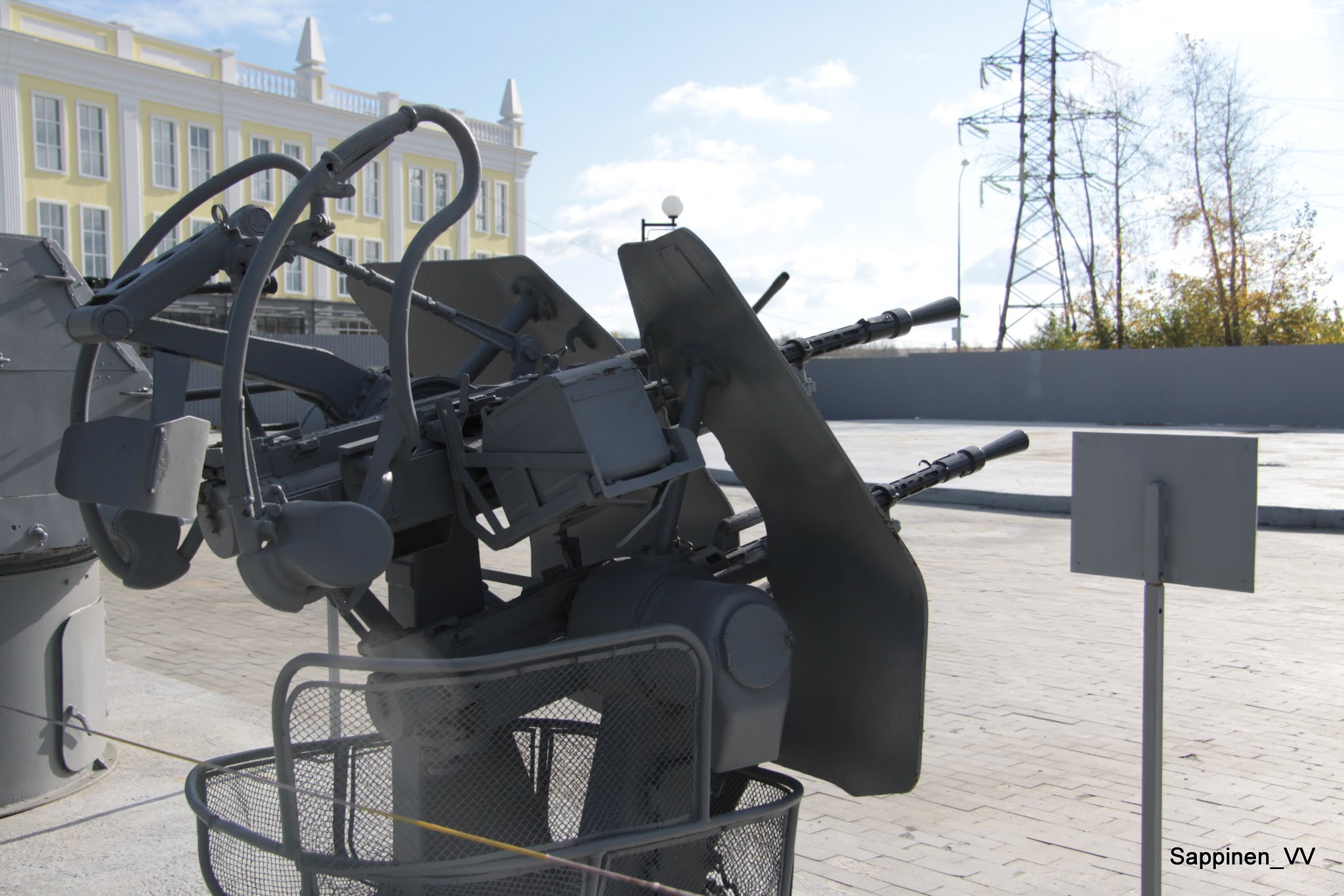
2M-7 naval machine gun mount (rear view)

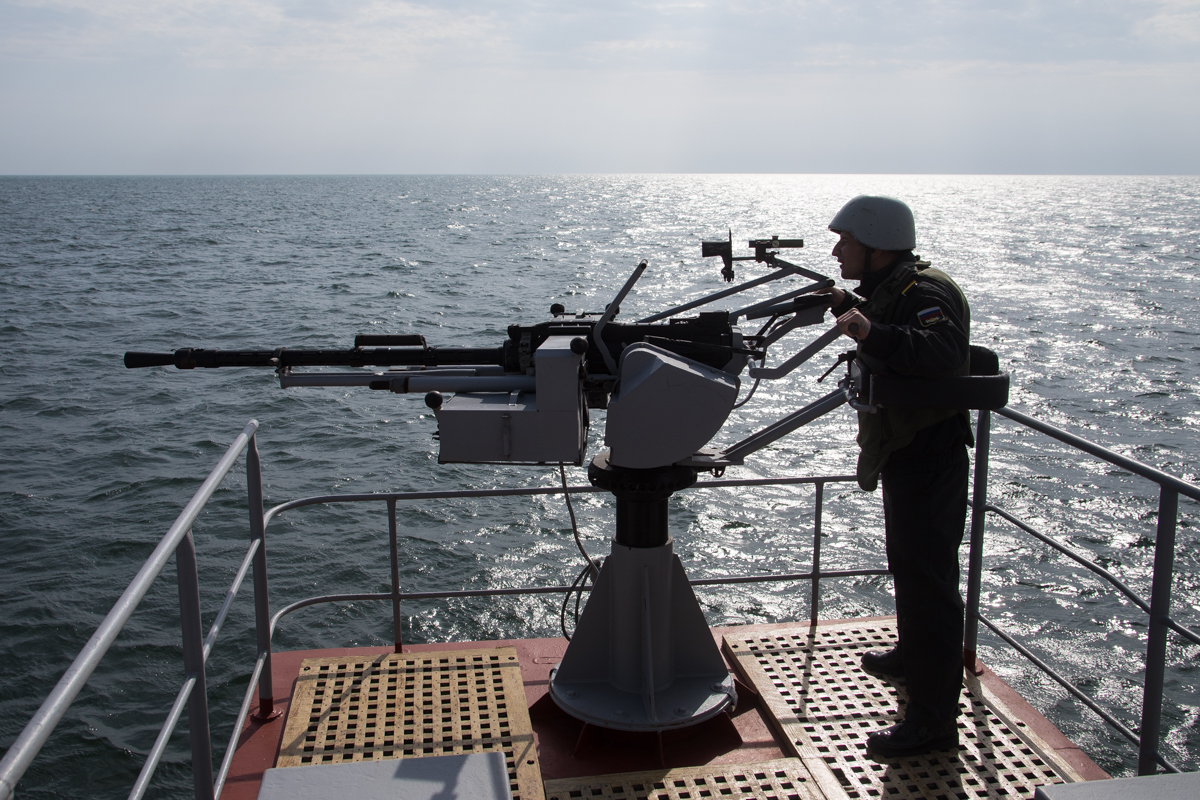
14.5 mm MTPU

== Ammunition ==
- B-32 – Armor-piercing incendiary full metal jacket round with a tungsten-carbide core. Projectile weight is 64.4 g (2.27 oz) and muzzle velocity is 976 m/s (3,200 ft/s). Armor penetration at 500 m (1,600 ft) is 32 mm (1.3 in) of rolled homogeneous armour (RHA) at 90 degrees.
- BZT – Armor-piercing incendiary tracer full metal jacket round with a steel core. Projectile weight is 59.56 g (2.101 oz) and muzzle velocity is 1,005 m/s (3,300 ft/s). Tracer burns to at least 2,000 m (6,600 ft).
- MDZ – High-explosive incendiary bullet of instant action. Projectile weight is 59.68 g (2.105 oz).

These rounds are also produced in Bulgaria, China, Egypt, Poland, and Romania.

== Operators ==
- Afghanistan
- Albania
- Algeria
- Angola
- Armenia
- Bangladesh
- Benin
- Bulgaria: locally produced
- Cambodia
- Cameroon
- Congo
- China: Type 56 (KPV) and Type 58 (KPVT) machine guns, produced by Norinco
- Cuba
- Egypt
- Eritrea
- Ethiopia
- Finland (KPVT)
- Georgia
- Guinea-Bissau
- Hungary
- India – Manufactured at Ordnance Factory Tiruchirappalli
- Iraq – Iraqi armed forces
  - Popular Mobilization Forces
  - Iraqi Kurdistan
- Iran
- Islamic State
- Ivory Coast
- Izz ad-Din al-Qassam Brigades
- Laos
- Lebanon
- Libya
- Malawi
- Mali – Armed and Security Forces of Mali
- Malta – North Korean-made KPVs.
- Mongolia
- Morocco
- Mozambique
- Myanmar
- North Korea
- Nicaragua
- Pakistan: Used by the Pakistan Army.
- Panama
- Poland
- Romania: KPV and KPVT built under license
- Russia
- Sahrawi Arab Democratic Republic
- São Tomé and Príncipe
- Serbia (KPVT)
- Sierra Leone: Chinese QJG56 and Polish KPVT
- Slovenia (KPVT)
- Somalia
- South Africa
- Sri Lanka
  - Liberation Tigers of Tamil Eelam
- Sudan
- Syria
- Syrian Democratic Forces
- Togo
- Ukraine
- Yemen
- Vietnam
- Tanzania
- Zimbabwe

=== Former operators ===
- Czechoslovakia
- Soviet Union

== See also ==
- List of Russian weaponry
- Weapons featured in the film 13 Hours: The Secret Soldiers of Benghazi
