= USS Decker =

Destroyer escort built in 1942

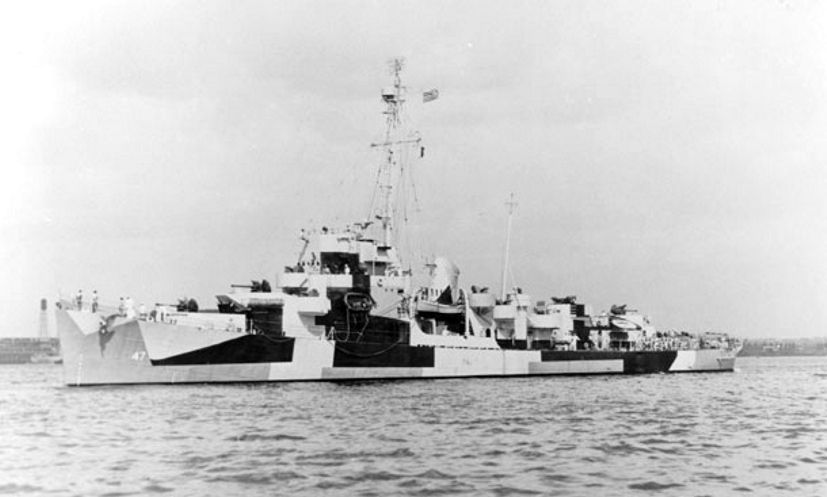
- USS Decker (DE-47)

History

United States
- Name: BDE-47
- Builder: Philadelphia Navy Yard
- Laid down: 1 April 1942
- Launched: 24 July 1942
- Renamed: USS Decker (DE-47), 4 March 1943
- Namesake: Ernest Elden Decker
- Commissioned: 3 May 1943
- Decommissioned: 28 August 1945
- Fate: transferred to Republic of China, 28 August 1945
- Stricken: 12 March 1948

History

Republic of China
- Name: ROCS Tai Ping (F-22)
- Acquired: 28 August 1945
- Fate: Sunk by Communist Chinese forces, Tachen Islands, 14 November 1954

General characteristics
- Class & type: Evarts-class destroyer escort
- Displacement: 1,140 (standard), 1,430 tons (full)
- Length: 283 ft 6 in (86.41 m) (waterline), 289 ft 5 in (88.21 m) (overall))
- Beam: 35 ft 2 in (10.72 m)
- Draft: 11 ft 0 in (3.35 m) (max)
- Propulsion: 4 General Motors Model 16-278A diesel engines with electric drive; 6,000 shp; 2 screws
- Speed: 19 knots (35 km/h)
- Range: 4,150 nm
- Complement: 15 officers, 183 enlisted
- Armament: 3 × 3 in/50 cal Mk 22 dual purpose guns (1×3), 4 × 1.1 in/75 cal Mk 2 AA guns (1×4), 9 × Oerlikon 20 mm Mk 4 AA cannons, 1 × Hedgehog Projector Mk 10 (144 rounds), 8 × Mk 6 depth charge projectors, 2 × Mk 9 depth charge tracks

USS Decker (DE-47) was an Evarts-class destroyer escort constructed for the United States Navy during World War II. She was sent off into dangerous North Atlantic Ocean waters to protect convoys and other ships from German submarines and fighter aircraft. She performed escort and antisubmarine operations in battle areas before sailing home victorious at the end of the conflict.

== Design ==
The Evarts-class destroyer escorts were 289 ft 5 in (88.21 m) long overall, and they had a beam of 35 ft 2 in (10.72 m). They had an average draft of 10 ft 1 in (3.07 m) at their full load displacement of 1,416 long tons (1,439 t). Each ship had a normal crew numbered 156 officers and sailors.

Decker was propelled by a pair of diesel motors manufactured by General Motors, which drove a pair of screw propellers. Her propulsion system was rated to produce 6,000 brake horsepower (4,500 kW) for a top speed of 19.5 knots (36.1 km/h; 22.4 mph). Oil storage amounted to between 131 and 197 long tons (133 and 200 t), which allowed a cruising radius of up to 6,000 nautical miles (11,000 km; 6,900 mi) at an economical pace of 10 knots (19 km/h; 12 mph).

The ship's armament consisted of a main battery of three 3-inch (76 mm) /50-caliber guns in individual pivot mounts, which could be used against air or surface targets. These were supported by a light anti-aircraft battery that initially consisted of four 1.1 in (28 mm) /75-caliber guns in a quadruple mount and nine 20 mm (0.79 in) Oerlikon guns. For attacks against submarines, the ship was equipped with a Hedgehog mortar, eight depth charge throwers, and two depth charge racks.

== Service history ==
Originally intended for transfer to Great Britain as BDE-47, the ship was launched on 24 July 1942 by the Philadelphia Navy Yard; retained for use in the USN; redesignated Decker (DE-47) on 4 March 1943. The ship was named after Ernest Decker, a naval officer killed during the Solomon Islands campaign. Decker was commissioned on 3 May 1943.

After escorting two oilers from Newport, Rhode Island to Galveston, Texas from 9–24 July 1943, Decker reported at Norfolk, Virginia on 20 August for convoy duty. From 26 August 1943 – 26 April 1945, she gave vital support to operations in North Africa, Italy, and Southern France by guarding the passage of nine supply convoys to Casablanca, French Morocco; Bizerte, Tunisia; Palermo, Sicily; and Oran, Algeria. On 11 May 1944, at sea as part of the screen of UGS-40 bound for Tunisia, she aided in repelling a heavy torpedo attack by enemy planes. After overhaul at Charleston, South Carolina, Decker operated in the Florida Keys as a training vessel until the end of the war. Decker received one battle star for World War II service.

On 28 August 1945, she was leased to the Republic of China. Decker was returned from Lend-Lease and transferred permanently to China on 7 February 1948 and renamed ROCS Tai Ping (F-22; Chinese: 太平). ROCS Tai-ping was one of the four warships sent by the Republic of China Navy on 6 November 1946 to claim islands within the South China Sea region. On 12 December 1946 Tai Ping arrived at Itu Aba island, becoming the first Chinese government ship ever to visit the Spratly Islands. (An American force had landed on Itu Aba in November 1945 and discovered that the wartime Japanese garrison had departed. A French warship, the FR Chevreuil had landed a team on Itu Aba in October 1946, two months before the Tai-ping arrived.) The Chinese government gave Itu Aba the Chinese name of Taiping Island in honour of the ship.

On 13 February 1951, she joined the blockade fleet under the direct order of ROC President Chiang Kai-shek to capture and confiscate the Norwegian civilian freighter Hoi Houw at 24°13′00″N 123°18′00″E within the Japanese territory of Yaeyama Islands. On 14 November 1954, four Communist Chinese P 4-class torpedo boats sank Tai Ping north of the Tachen Islands. All but 28 of the 200 officers and crew were reported rescued by ships and seaplanes.

== Awards ==
- Combat Action Ribbon (retroactive)
- American Campaign Medal
- European-African-Middle Eastern Campaign Medal (with one service star)
- World War II Victory Medal
