= G-5-class motor torpedo boat =

World War II Soviet torpedo boat

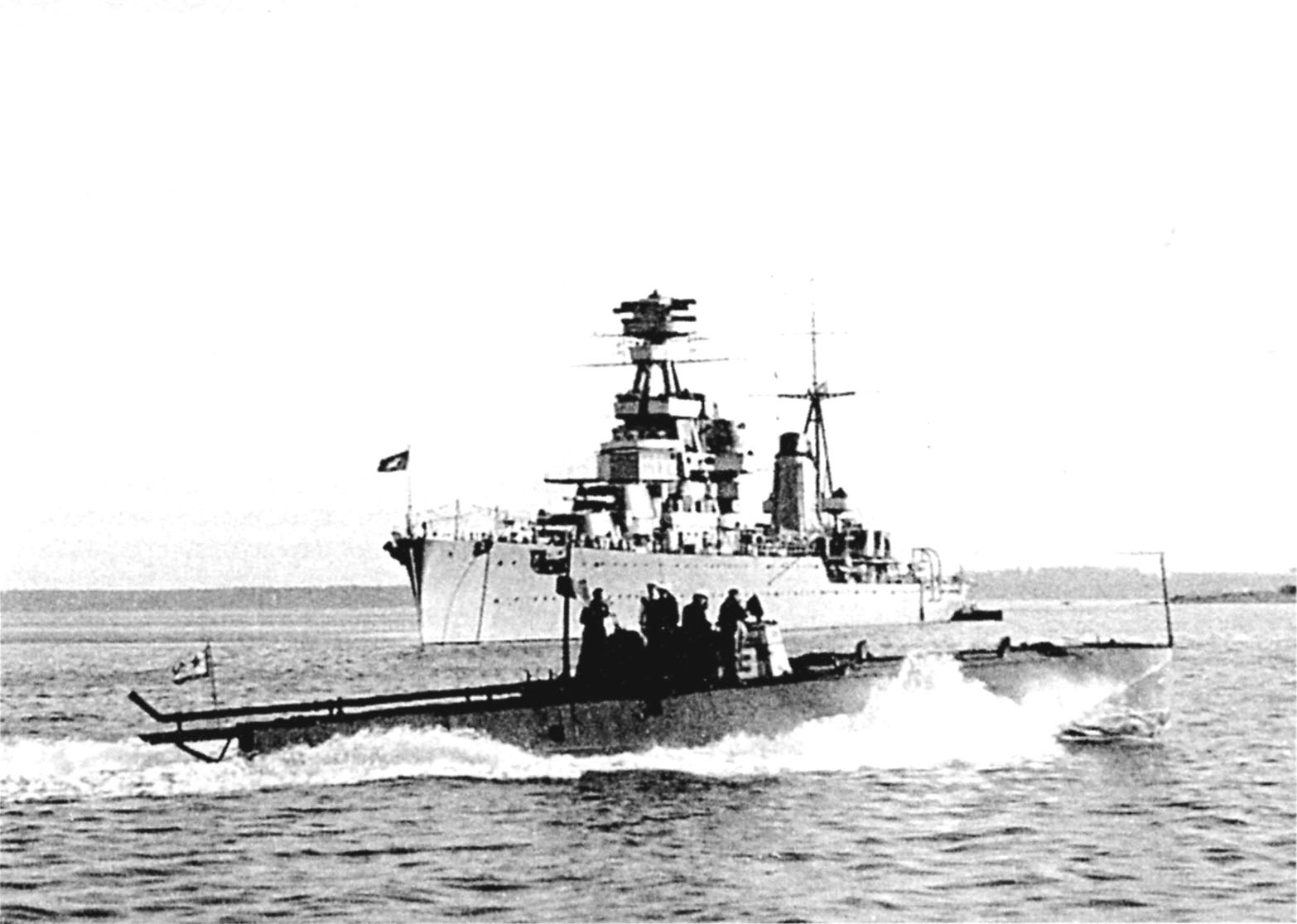
- A G-5-class motor torpedo boat passing in front of the Soviet cruiser Kirov in 1940

Class overview
- Operators: Soviet Navy; Spanish Navy; Spanish Navy; Finnish Navy; Korean People's Navy
- Preceded by: Stalnoy class
- Succeeded by: D3 class
- Subclasses: Series 7, 8, 9, 10, 11
- Built: 1933–1941
- In commission: 1934–late 1950s
- Completed: about 300
- Lost: 73
- Preserved: 2 (1 in Russia, 1 in North Korea)

General characteristics (Series 10)
- Type: Motor torpedo boat
- Displacement: 16.26 tonnes (16.00 long tons; 17.92 short tons) (standard)
- Length: 18.85–19.1 m (61 ft 10 in – 62 ft 8 in) overall
- Beam: 3.5 m (11 ft 6 in)
- Draught: 0.82 m (2 ft 8 in)
- Propulsion: 2 shafts, 2 × Mikulin GAM-34BS petrol engines; 850 bhp (630 kW) each
- Speed: 53 knots (61 mph; 98 km/h)
- Complement: 6-7
- Armament: 1-2 12.7 mm (0.50 in) DShK machine gun(s); 2 × 533 mm (21 in) torpedoes
- Notes: 1,600 kg (3,500 lb) of fuel

The G-5 was a Soviet motor torpedo boat design built before and during World War II. Approximately 300 were built, of which 73 were lost during the war. Four were exported to the Spanish Republican Navy during the Spanish Civil War and others were transferred to North Korea after the war. Three were captured by the Finns, but only two were used before all three had to be returned to the Soviets after the Moscow Armistice in 1944.

== Design and development ==
The G-5 class was an improved and enlarged version of the Sh-4-class motor torpedo boats which were derived from a design by Andrei Tupolev, a noted aircraft designer. It was intended to use Soviet-built engines and carry larger torpedoes than its predecessor. A prototype was designed and built by TsAGI (Russian: Центра́льный аэрогидродинами́ческий институ́т or "Tsentralniy Aerogidrodinamicheskiy Institut", the Central Aerohydrodynamic Institute) in 1932–33. As its intended engines were not yet available two 1,000 bhp (750 kW) Isotta Fraschini engines were imported from Italy. Unarmed, and with a partial fuel load, it achieved a maximum speed of 63.5 knots (73.1 mph; 117.6 km/h) during its trials in the Black Sea during 1933 and the decision was made to place it into production.

The G-5 was a single-step, hydroplaning design with a whaleback upper hull. It was mainly built from duralumin which saved a significant amount of weight, but greatly complicated its use in service because of duralumin's susceptibility to galvanic corrosion in salt water. One captured Soviet torpedo boat commander said that G-5s could only be kept in the water for 5–7 days during the summer and 10–15 days during the winter before it had to be removed from the water and treated with anti-corrosion measures. The hull was divided into three compartments by two transverse bulkheads. The superstructure was very small to reduce top-heaviness, and crewmembers could not stand up inside it.

The G-5 was designed to use a version of the Mikulin AM-34 aircraft engine adapted for maritime use as the GAM-34. The two engines were fitted in the forward compartment of the hull. Each engine had its own transmission and drove a bronze propeller .67 m (2 ft 2 in) in diameter. The initial version of the GAM-34 was less powerful than planned at only 675 bhp (503 kW) and the initial Series 7 boats could only reach 45 knots (52 mph; 83 km/h). However the minimum speed was 18 knots (21 mph; 33 km/h) which caused a great deal of trouble when trying to moor and when maneuvering in close proximity.

The two torpedoes were carried in troughs set into the rear deck in a manner derived from that used by the British WW I-era coastal motor boats captured by the Soviets during Russian Civil War. The torpedoes were shoved out the back of the trough by an arbor with a bell-shaped head that was activated by an explosive charge, but the torpedo motor was not activated until a wire trailing from the boat snapped, giving the boat time to turn away from the target. This launching system was very light, but it required additional training to properly aim the torpedo and prior coordination when making massed torpedo attacks to prevent the boats from ramming each other or the torpedoes.

The gun armament initially consisted of a single 7.62 mm (0.300 in) machine gun, but this was upgraded to a 12.7 mm (0.50 in) DShK machine gun in later models. Some later boats carried two DShKs although the mounts varied; some were placed in a tub in the forecastle, but others carried theirs in a rotating turret behind the superstructure, above the torpedoes. Some boats carried 82 mm (3.2 in) ROFS-82 or 132 mm (5.2 in) ROFS-132 rocket launchers in fixed mounts above and behind the wheelhouse.

== Production ==
Approximately 300 G-5s were built. 152 of the Series 7, 8 and 9 boats were built between 1934 and 1936. 20 Series 10 boats were built in 1937, another 76 in 1938–39 and five in 1939–40. 39 Series 11 boats were built beginning in 1941 and production may have continued during the war.

G-5

=== Variants ===
Series 7

They weighed 14.03 tonnes (13.81 long tons; 15.47 short tons) at standard load, had an overall length of 18.85 m (61.8 ft) and drew 0.6 m (2 ft 0 in) of water. They were armed with a single 7.62 mm (0.300 in) machine gun and sometimes an additional 12.7 mm DShK machine gun.

Series 8

Essentially identical to the Series 7 except that they had only a single DShK machine gun.

Series 9

Slightly enlarged version of the Series 8. Displacement increased to 14.85 tonnes (14.62 long tons; 16.37 short tons) at standard load, draft to 0.65 m (2 ft 2 in) and overall length ranged from 18.85 to 19.08 m (61.8 to 62.6 ft). Fitted with more powerful GAM-34B engines that produced 800 bhp (600 kW) and raised the maximum speed to 49 knots (56 mph; 91 km/h). 1,450 kg (3,200 lb) of fuel.

Series 10

Displacement increased still further to 16.26 tonnes (16.00 long tons; 17.92 short tons) and draft to 0.82 m (2 ft 8 in). They mounted more powerful GAM-34BS engines with 850 bhp (630 kW) that boosted their speed to a maximum of 53 knots (61 mph; 98 km/h).

Series 11

Used 1,000 bhp (750 kW) GAM-34BSF engines and had a top speed of 56 knots (64 mph; 104 km/h). Their armament increased to two DShK machine guns.

== Service history ==
On 22 June 1941, the day that the Germans invaded the Soviet Union, 254 G-5s were in service. The Baltic Fleet had 60, the Black Sea Fleet had 92, the Pacific Fleet had 135 and the Caspian Flotilla had six. During the war 73 were lost in action and 31 were scrapped after becoming unserviceable. By the end of the war in 1945 24 were in service with the Baltic Fleet, 134 were with the Pacific Fleet and six were still with the Caspian Flotilla.

Many of the Soviet G-5s were used for different roles (landing units, transports, escorts, etc..) and saw a relatively low numbers of torpedo attacks against enemy targets. In Baltic Sea TK-94 scored the locally significant sinking of Finnish minelayer Riilahti. The only other known sinking caused by G-5s in Baltic Sea was the German minesweeper M37. Likewise, few victories were scored in Black Sea. During the Crimean Offensive, on the night of 27 April, three G-5s attacked and crippled the German submarine hunter UJ-104 near Sevastopol. The Romanian gunboat Sublocotenent Ghiculescu opened fire with starshell rounds, enabling several more warships to locate the three boats and begin firing, resulting in one of the G-5s being sunk. UJ-104 was towed to Sevastopol and later sunk by Soviet aircraft. Later, some G-5s sank the already damaged and abandoned Romanian minelayer Romania.

On 18 November 1942 the Finnish motor torpedo boat Syöksy, the captured G-5 boats Vinha and Vihuri, as well as a minelaying KM-boat, attacked Soviet ships in the harbour of Lavansaari. Syöksy sank the Soviet gunboat Krasnoye Znamya, although she was later raised and put back into service.

=== Exports ===
Four boats were transferred to the Spanish Republican Navy during the Spanish Civil War, two continue in service after the war in the Spanish Nationalist navy until 1946. A number were transferred by the Soviet Union to North Korea after the end of the war.

=== Preservation ===
Two boats apparently survived:

- Torpedo Boat No. 21 which served in the Korean People's Navy at the Victorious War Museum in Pyongyang. Claimed to have sunk the American cruiser USS Baltimore, but this is false.
- In 2020, the Russian Navy recovered a G-5 which had been sunk during the Siege of Sevastopol. It is currently under restoration.
