= Battle of Nerva Island =

Coordinates: 60.267°N 28.283°E

- Part of the Eastern Front of World War II
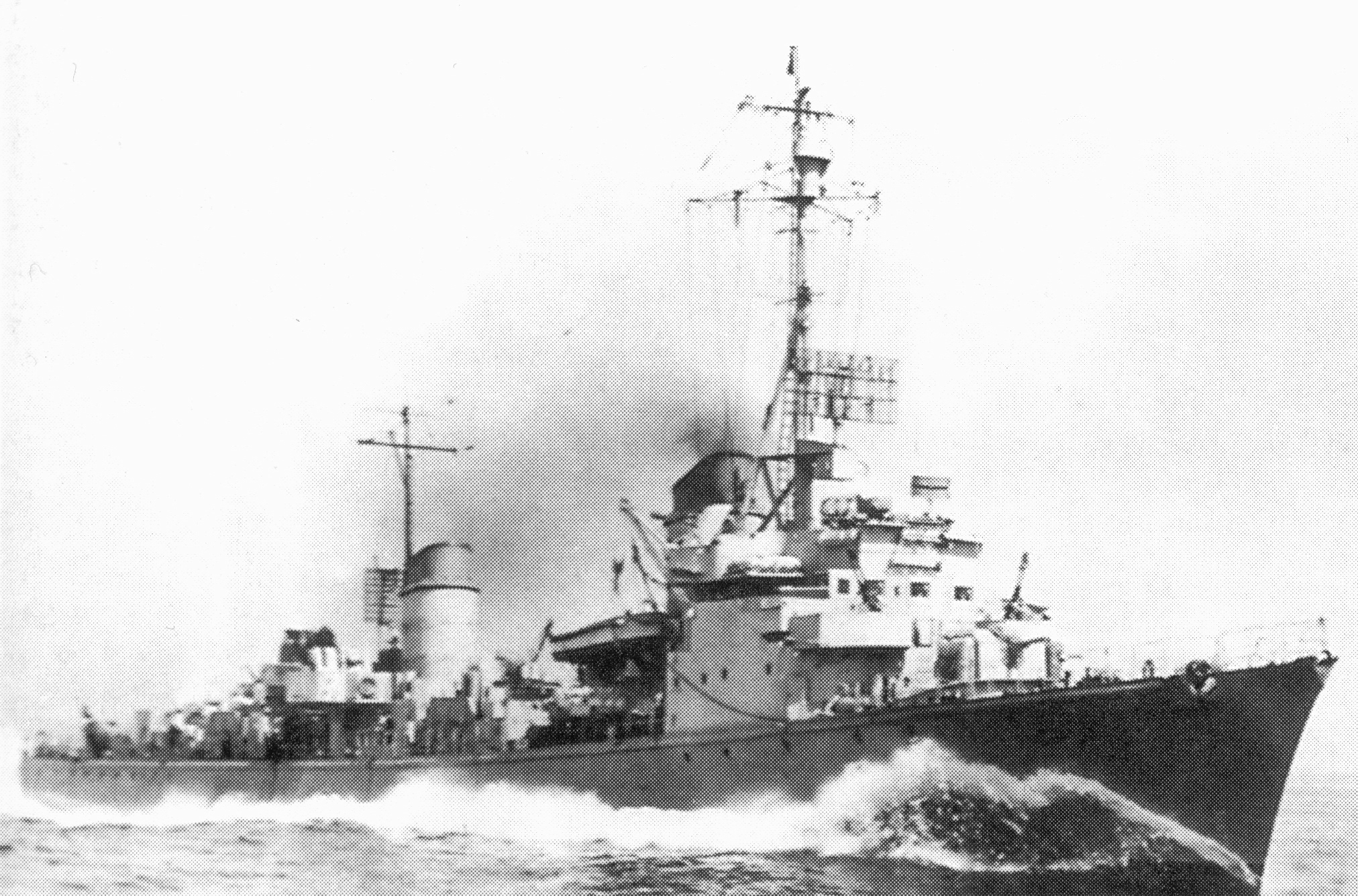
- T35, sister ship of T31 and T30 of the Elbing class
Date	19–20 June 1944
Location	close Nerva Island in Gulf of Finland
Result	Soviet victory

Belligerents
Germany	Soviet Union

Commanders and leaders
(Nazi Germany) Heinrich Peter-Pirkham	(Soviet Union) S.A.Osipov

Strength
2 torpedo boats	Minor units of the Soviet Baltic Fleet (4 gunboats, 10 patrol boats, 14 motor torpedo boats)

Casualties and losses
1 torpedo boat sunk, 1 torpedo boat damaged 78 killed, 21 wounded, 6 captured	8 units damaged unknown human losses

The Battle of Nerva Island took place in the Gulf of Finland during World War II on 19–20 June 1944 between the Soviet Union and Germany, which occurred amid the 1944 Soviet offensive against Finland. It was one of the few engagements in the Baltic theater with large surface ships.

== Background ==
Nerva (or Narvi) Island was a strategic target conquered by the Soviet forces in preparation for the following Battle of Vyborg Bay (1944). The Kriegsmarine begun the "Operation Drosselfang" on Koivusaari/Piisaari area, to attack Soviet small ships supporting the combined Soviet operations. The action was relevant for the involvement of German large surface vessels: the Elbing-class fleet torpedo boats T30 and T31.

== Battle ==
No major Soviet warships were in action (most of them were blocked in Leningrad), and the Soviet Navy engaged possessed in the area 4 small gunboats, 10 patrol boats (MO-4-class submarine chasers), and 14 motor torpedo boats. German torpedo boats shelled the Soviets but caused only damage to the two gunboats MBK-503, MBK-505 and on the MO-106, without sinking them. The Soviets counter-attacked with their motor torpedo boats, the first attack was repelled with damage to TK-53, TK-63 and TK-153, while the second attack was another failure with damage to TK-101 and TK-103. Finally, TK-37 and TK-60 made a pincer attack and launched their torpedoes at the same time against T31, the German torpedo boat was hit and sunk. Other sources give credit to the victory only to TK-37. 76 German sailors lost their lives, while 6 were captured by Soviets. Finnish units rescued other German sailors (including 23 wounded, two died of wounds). After the loss of her sister ship, T30 retreated after having suffered light damage (one sailor killed and 13 wounded). Germans claimed to have sunk a number of Soviet attacking motor torpedo boats but actually despite some were damaged, none was sunk.

== Aftermath ==
The battle resulted in a rare naval victory for the Soviets. The German forces failed to sink any Soviet ship, while they lost a torpedo boat. The following month, on 16 July 1944, the Germans attempted a repetition of the mission (“Operation Buckenwald”), engaging torpedo boats T30, T8 and T10, the action resulted in a brief inconclusive skirmish with Soviet torpedo boat Tucha and minesweepers T-211 Rym and T-217 Kontr-Admiral Yurkovskiy. No damage occurred to the major warships, although shortly before the fight the Soviets suffered damage to two small patrol boats.
