= Developer! Developer! Developer! =

Community conference for software developers

Developer! Developer! Developer!, more commonly known as DDD, is a series of community conferences aimed at software developers.

== History ==
DDD conferences started in 2005, as a community conference organised by software developers for software developers. The first was held at Microsoft's TVP campus in Reading, United Kingdom. There have been 10 DDD conference held in this location, as well as a number of regional conferences held in Belfast, Bristol, Wales, Cambridge, Dublin, Dundee, Edinburgh, Galway, Glasgow, Leeds, Sunderland, Taunton and Bradford. In Australia: Perth, Sydney, Melbourne, Brisbane, Adelaide, and the Outback. In South Korea: Seoul.

The original DDD event in Reading has frequently sold out on the day the tickets become available. The record is 350 tickets selling out in 13 minutes.

== Key Values ==
DDD was set up with a number of key elements in mind.

- It is free
- It is on a Saturday
- An open submissions process
- A democratically chosen agenda

The Australian DDD events do have a nominal ticket price, primarily to minimise the number of people who register to attend but don't show up. Subsidised tickets are available for those who can't afford this.
