= German torpedo boat T31 =

German torpedo boat

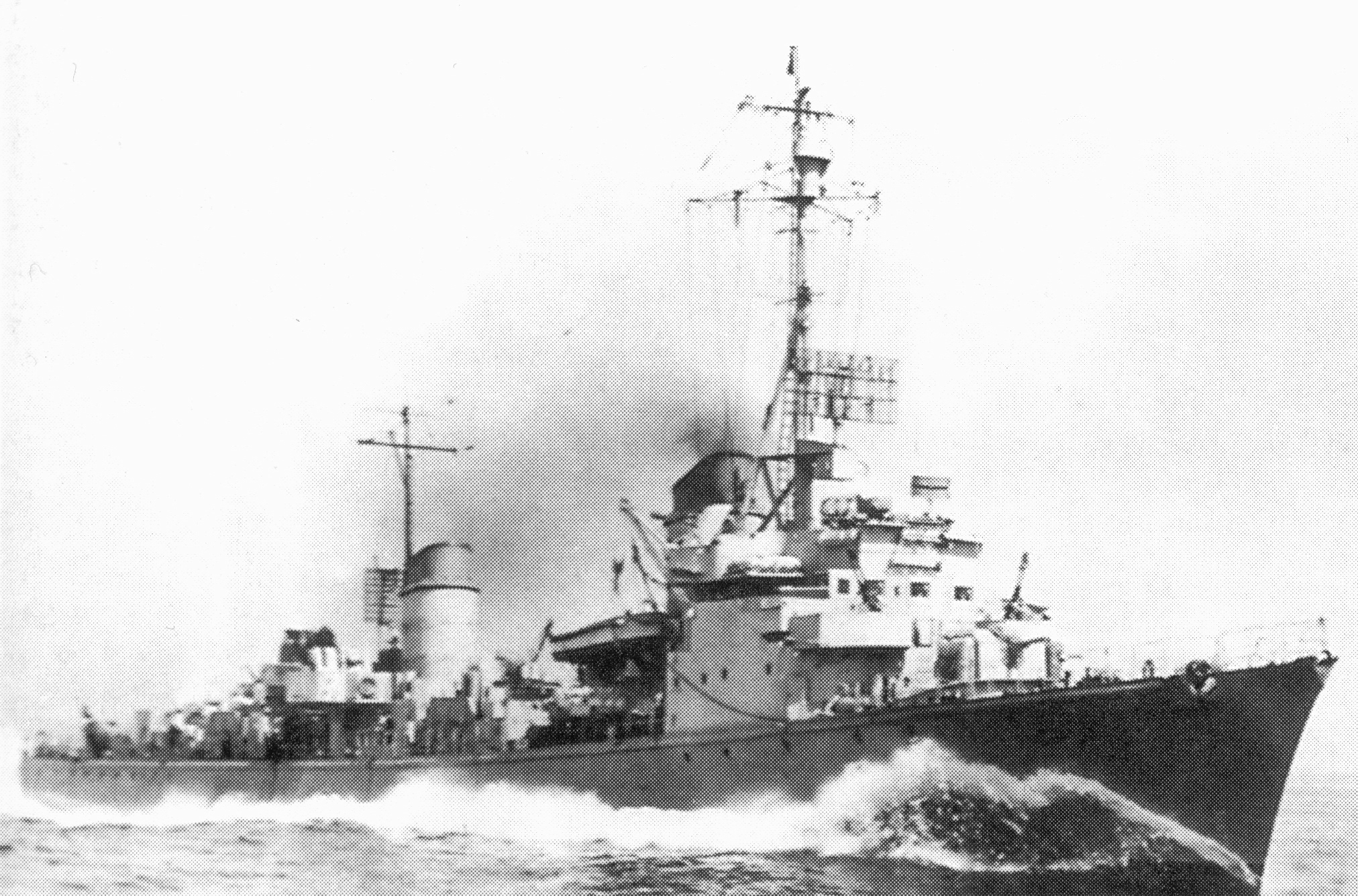
- Sister ship T35 in US service, August 1945

History

Nazi Germany
- Name: T31
- Ordered: 20 January 1941
- Builder: Schichau, Elbing, East Prussia
- Yard number: 1513
- Launched: 1943
- Completed: 5 February 1944
- Fate: Sunk by torpedo, 20 June 1944

General characteristics (as built)
- Class & type: Type 39 torpedo boat
- Displacement: 1,294 t (1,274 long tons) (standard); 1,754 t (1,726 long tons) (deep load)
- Length: 102.5 m (336 ft 3 in) o/a
- Beam: 10 m (32 ft 10 in)
- Draft: 3.22 m (10 ft 7 in)
- Installed power: 4 × water-tube boilers; 32,000 shp (24,000 kW)
- Propulsion: 2 × shafts; 2 × geared steam turbine sets
- Speed: 33.5 knots (62.0 km/h; 38.6 mph)
- Range: 2,400 nmi (4,400 km; 2,800 mi) at 19 knots (35 km/h; 22 mph)
- Complement: 206
- Sensors & processing systems: S-Gerät sonar; FuMO 21 radar
- Armament: 4 × single 10.5 cm (4.1 in) guns; 2 × twin 3.7 cm (1.5 in) AA guns; 3 × quadruple, 2 × single 2 cm (0.8 in) AA guns; 2 × triple 533 mm (21 in) torpedo tubes; 30–60 mines; 4 × depth charge launchers

The German torpedo boat T31 was one of fifteen Type 39 torpedo boats built for the Kriegsmarine (German Navy) during World War II. Completed in early 1944, the boat was assigned to convoy escort duties and supporting German forces in the Baltic. She was sunk in combat with Soviet motor torpedo boats on 20 June off the Finnish coast on 20 June with 82 men killed.

== Design and description ==
The Type 39 torpedo boat was conceived as a general-purpose design, much larger than preceding German torpedo boats. The boats had an overall length of 102.5 meters (336 ft 3 in) and were 97 meters (318 ft 3 in) long at the waterline. They had a beam of 10 meters (32 ft 10 in), a draft of 3.22 meters (10 ft 7 in) at deep load and displaced 1,294 metric tons (1,274 long tons) at standard load and 1,754 metric tons (1,726 long tons) at deep load. Their crew numbered 206 officers and sailors. The Type 39s were fitted with a pair of geared steam turbine sets, each driving one propeller, using steam from four high-pressure water-tube boilers. The turbines were designed to produce 32,000 shaft horsepower (24,000 kW) which was intended give the ships a maximum speed of 33.5 knots (62.0 km/h; 38.6 mph). They carried enough fuel oil to give them a range of 2,400 nautical miles (4,400 km; 2,800 mi) at 19 knots (35 km/h; 22 mph).

As built, the Type 39 ships mounted four 10.5 cm (4.1 in) SK C/32 guns in single mounts protected by gun shields; one forward of the superstructure, one between the funnels, and two aft, one superfiring over the other. Anti-aircraft defense was provided by four 3.7 cm (1.5 in) SK C/30 AA guns in two twin-gun mounts on platforms abaft the rear funnel and a dozen 2 cm (0.8 in) C/38 guns. One quadruple mount was positioned on the aft superstructure and two more were fitted on the bridge wings. They carried six above-water 533 mm (21 in) torpedo tubes in two triple mounts amidships and could also carry 30 mines; the full complement of 60 mines made the ships top-heavy which could be dangerous in bad weather. For anti-submarine work the boats were fitted with a S-Gerät sonar and four depth charge launchers. The Type 39s were equipped with a FuMO 21 (Note: Funkmess-Ortung (Radio-direction finder, active ranging)) radar and various FumB (Note: Funkmess-Beobachtung (Passive radar detector).) radar detectors were installed late in the war.

== Construction and career ==
T31 was ordered on 20 January 1941 from Schichau, laid down at their Elbing, East Prussia, shipyard as yard number 1513, launched in 1943 and commissioned on 5 February 1944. After working up, T31 and her sister T30 were tasked to support Finnish forces in Vyborg Bay and Koivisto Sound during the Vyborg–Petrozavodsk Offensive. On 20 June they engaged Soviet motor torpedo boats and claimed 3–5 boats sunk, but T31 was sunk by a torpedo from TKA37 at 60°16′N 28°17′E off Nerva (or Narvi) island, with the loss of 82 crewmen.
