= Pennsylvania Railroad class D3 =

PRR D3
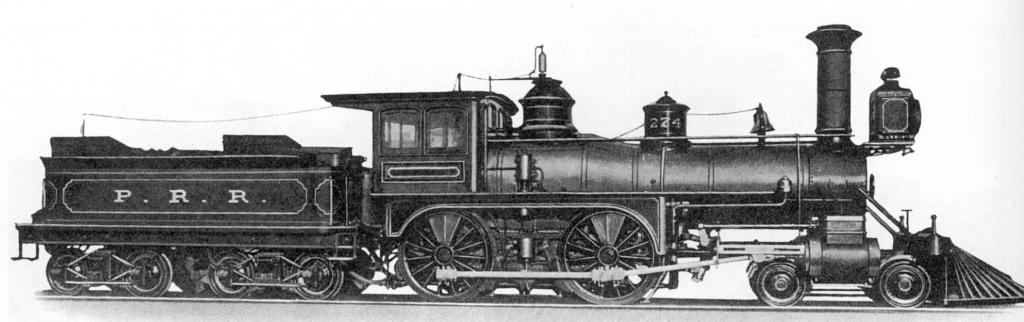
- PRR D3 #274 in its builders' portrait.
Type and origin
- Power type: Steam
- Builder: PRR Altoona Works
- Build date: 1869–1881
- Total produced: 67
Specifications
- Configuration
  - Whyte: 4-4-0
  - UIC: 2′B
- Gauge: 4 ft 8 1/2 in (1,435 mm)
- Leading dia.: 28 in (711 mm) (D2a)
- Driver dia.: 62 in (1,575 mm)
- Wheelbase: 22 ft 5 5/8 in (6.85 m)
- Length: 54 ft 5.44 in (16.60 m)
- Width: 9 ft 0.94 in (2.77 m)
- Height: 14 ft 8 in (4.47 m)
- Adhesive weight: 50,950 lb (23.1 tonnes)
- Loco weight: 79,100 lb (35.9 tonnes)
- Tender weight: 51,400 lb (23.3 tonnes)
- Total weight: 130,500 lb (59.2 tonnes)
- Tender type: Eight-wheel with water scoop
- Fuel type: Soft coal
- Fuel capacity: 8,000 lb (3.6 tonnes)
- Water cap.: 2,400 US gal (9,100 L; 2,000 imp gal)

The Pennsylvania Railroad's steam locomotive class D3 (formerly Class C, pre-1895) comprised sixty-seven 4-4-0 locomotives intended for general passenger and freight service, constructed at the railroad's own Altoona Works (now owned by Norfolk Southern) during 1869–1881. They were the third standardized class of locomotives on the railroad and the most numerous of the early standard types; they shared many parts with other standard classes.

This design differed from the Class A (later D1) mainly in its smaller drivers for greater tractive effort for freight haulage. Like all the early standardized 4-4-0s on the PRR, the Class C had a wagon-top boiler with steam dome and a firebox between the two driving axles.
