= BRP Panglao =

Philippine Coast Guard ship

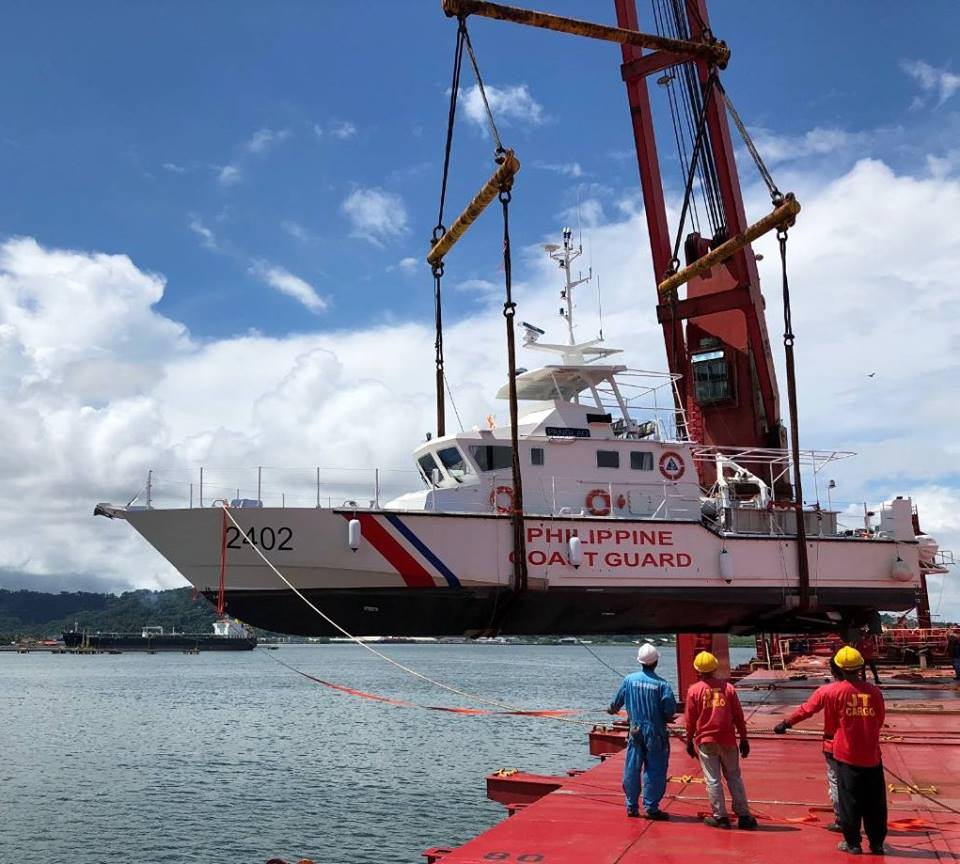
- BRP Panglao (FPB-2402)

History

Philippines
- Name: BRP Panglao
- Builder: OCEA
- Launched: 4 June 2018
- Commissioned: 15 October 2018
- Identification: Hull number: FPB-2402
- Status: in active service

General characteristics
- Type: Patrol Boat (WPB)
- Displacement: 120 tons
- Length: 24 metres (79 ft)
- Beam: 5.8 metres (19 ft)
- Draught: 1.7 metres (5 ft 7 in)
- Propulsion: 2 x 10V 2000 M72 MTU engines
- Speed: 28 knots (52 km/h; 32 mph)
- Range: 800 nautical miles (1,500 km; 920 mi) at 21 knots (39 km/h; 24 mph); 2,000 nautical miles (3,700 km; 2,300 mi) at 12 knots (22 km/h; 14 mph)
- Complement: 12
- Armament: .50cal M2HB M2 Browning Machine Gun

BRP Panglao (FPB-2402) is the second of four Boracay class Patrol Boats built by OCEA of France for the Philippine Coast Guard based on the Ocea FPB 72 design.

== Construction, delivery and commissioning ==
BRP Panglao was launched in June 2018 at the OCEA site in Les Sables d’Olonne, France and was commissioned into service in Manila, Philippines in October 2018 along with its sister ship,BRP Boracay (FPB-2401).

== Operational history ==
In November 2018, BRP Panglao participated in a joint Anti-Piracy Drill with the Japan Coast Guard ship Echigo (PLH-08) and PCG ships the BRP Suluan (MRRV-4406) and BRP Boracay (2401). The drill was held in Manila Bay and featured the mock hijacking of a vessel and arrest of the perpetrators aboard the ship.

In January 2019, the ship together with the BRP Boracay (2401) was positioned at the Manila Baywalk to serve as Command Post and alternate Medical Evacuation Post in case of Emergencies during the annual Traslación Procession of the Black Nazarene image.
