= BRP Boracay =

Philippine Coast Guard ship

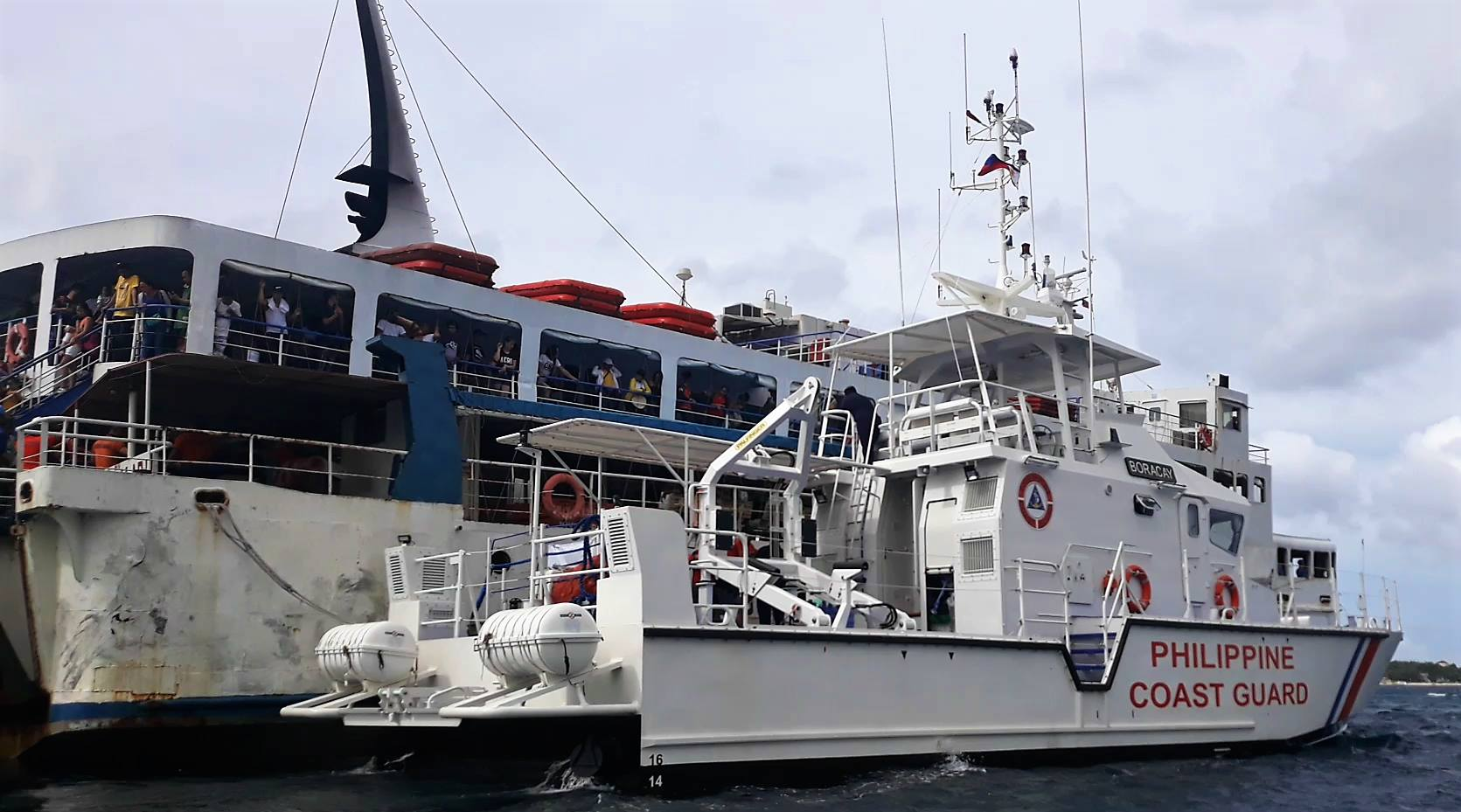
- BRP Boracay (FPB 2401) during its rescue operations in Aklan.

History

Philippines
- Name: BRP Boracay (FPB-2401)
- Builder: OCEA
- Launched: 25 April 2018
- Commissioned: 15 October 2018
- Identification: Hull number: FPB-2401
- Status: in active service

General characteristics
- Type: Patrol Boat (WPB)
- Displacement: 120 tons
- Length: 24 metres (79 ft)
- Beam: 5.8 metres (19 ft)
- Draught: 1.7 metres (5 ft 7 in)
- Propulsion: 2 x 10V 2000 M72 MTU engines
- Speed: 28 knots (52 km/h; 32 mph)
- Range: 800 nautical miles (1,500 km; 920 mi) at 21 knots (39 km/h; 24 mph); 2,000 nautical miles (3,700 km; 2,300 mi) at 12 knots (22 km/h; 14 mph)
- Complement: 12
- Armament: .50cal M2HB M2 Browning Machine Gun

BRP Boracay (FPB-2401) is the lead ship of four Boracay class Patrol Boats built by OCEA of France for the Philippine Coast Guard based on the Ocea FPB 72 design.

== Construction, delivery and commissioning ==
BRP Boracay was launched in April 2018 at the OCEA site in Les Sables d’Olonne, France and was commissioned into service in Manila, Philippines in October 2018 along with its sister ship, the BRP Panglao (2402).

== Operational history ==
In early October 2018, BRP Boracay made its first deployment in the island it was named after, Boracay in the province of Aklan, Western Visayas.

In late October 2018, the ship made its first rescue when it along with BRP Cape Engaño assisted in the transfer of passengers of the M/V Super Shuttle 18 which was stranded off the port of Malay, Aklan due to engine trouble. All of the 142 passengers of M/V Super Shuttle 18 were later safely brought to the Caticlan Jetty Port.

In November 2018, BRP Boracay participated in a joint Anti-Piracy Drill with the Japan Coast Guard ship Echigo (PLH-08) and PCG ships the BRP Suluan (MRRV-4406) and BRP Panglao (2402). The drill was held in Manila Bay and featured the mock hijacking of a vessel and arrest of the perpetrators aboard the ship.

In January 2019, the ship together with the BRP Panglao (2402) was positioned at the Manila Baywalk to serve as Command Post and alternate Medical Evacuation Post in case of Emergencies during the annual Traslación Procession of the Black Nazarene image.
