= BRP Amelia Gordon =

Vessel of the Philippine Coast Guard

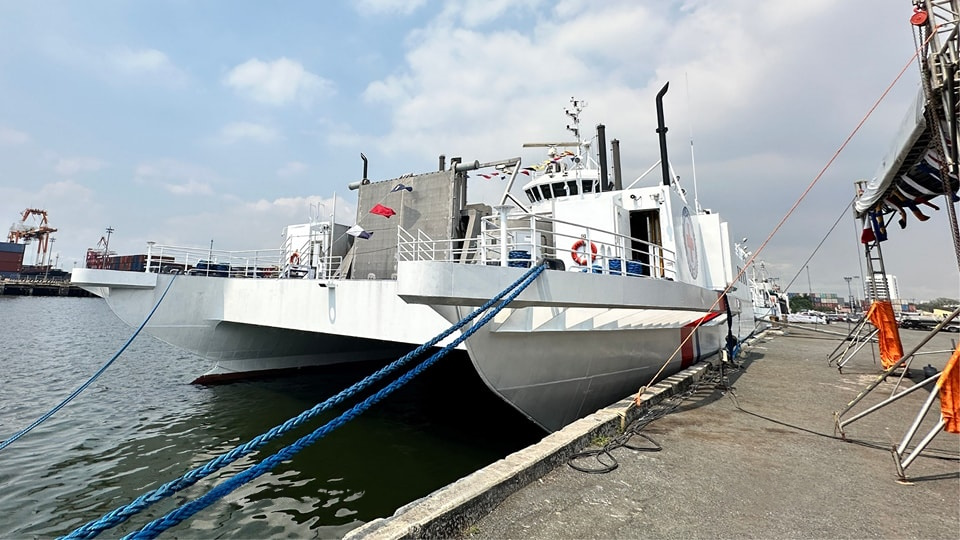

History

United States
- Name: MV Susitna
- Owner: Matanuska-Susitna Borough
- Builder: Alaska Ship and Drydock, Inc.
- Laid down: August 24, 2006
- Launched: April 2010
- Sponsored by: Lisa Murkowski
- Christened: June 11, 2010
- Acquired: 2011
- In service: Never used (planned for Knik Arm ferry)
- Home port: Ward Cove, Ketchikan, Alaska
- Fate: Transferred to the Philippine Red Cross

Philippines
- Name: MV Amazing Grace (May 2017–March 18, 2025); BRP Amelia Gordon (March 18, 2025–present)
- Namesake: Amelia Gordon
- Owner: Philippine Red Cross (2016–2025); Philippine Coast Guard (2025–present)
- Acquired: June 30, 2016
- Commissioned: May 2017

General characteristics
- Displacement: 940 tons
- Length: 60 m (200 ft)
- Installed power: 4 ea., MTU 12V 4000 diesel engines
- Speed: 20 knots (37 km/h; 23 mph)

BRP Amelia Gordon is a humanitarian and hospital ship of the Philippine Coast Guard.

Originally built in Alaska as a United States Navy prototype ship, Amelia Gordon was originally christened as Susitna. Susitna was acquired by the Matanuska-Susitna Borough in 2011 intending her for the proposed Knik Arm ferry service.

Susitna remained unused until its transfer to the Philippine Red Cross in 2016. Renamed as MV Amazing Grace, the ship served as a humanitarian ship of the PRC until her donation to the Philippine Coast Guard in 2025.

== History ==
=== MV Susitna ===
==== Construction ====
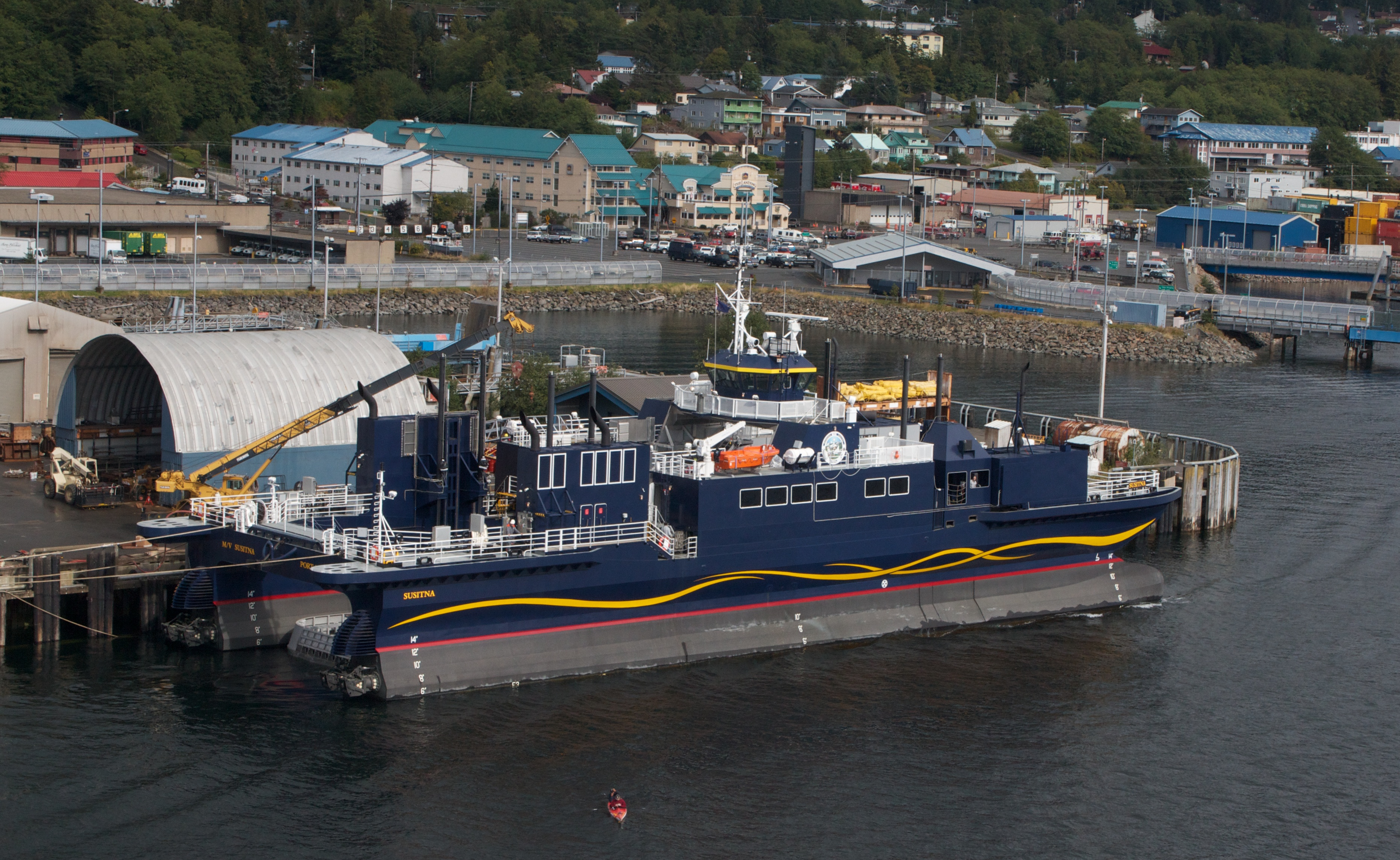
MV Susitna being outfitted in Ketchikan for delivery to Anchorage.

The ferry is a one-of-a-kind, ice-capable vessel that can transition from barge to twin-hulled ship, designed by Guido, Perla & Associates based on a concept by Lockheed-Martin Corporation for the Office of Naval Research as a half-sized prototype for a military vessel.

Susitna was built by Alaska Ship and Drydock, Inc., in Ketchikan. Design and construction costs were funded by the United States Navy Office of Naval Research to study the technology for its potential as a new type of expeditionary landing craft, also called an "E-craft".

The keel laying for the ship which was eventually named after the Susitna River was held on August 24, 2006. Senator Lisa Murkowski was the ship sponsor. Susitna was launched in April 2010. She was formally christened as the MV Susitna on June 11, 2010.

The vessel is 59 meters (193 ft 7 in) long and has a capacity is 129 passengers and 20 automobiles. Her design incorporates lift technology that allows changing from the Small Waterplane Area Twin Hull (SWATH) mode to barge mode by lowering or raising her center deck.

==== Under Matanuska-Susitna Borough ====
The Matanuska-Susitna Borough government acquired the ship in 2011. Originally intended for use in the Knik Arm passenger ferry system, Susitna remained berthed and unused at the Ward Cove dock. Susitna costed the borough $12.6 million including maintenance, repair, insurance, and other associated costs until her sale and transfer to the Philippine Red Cross in 2016. This include repair work on the ship after her engine suffered damage due to heavy rainfall in February 2015.

=== MV Amazing Grace ===
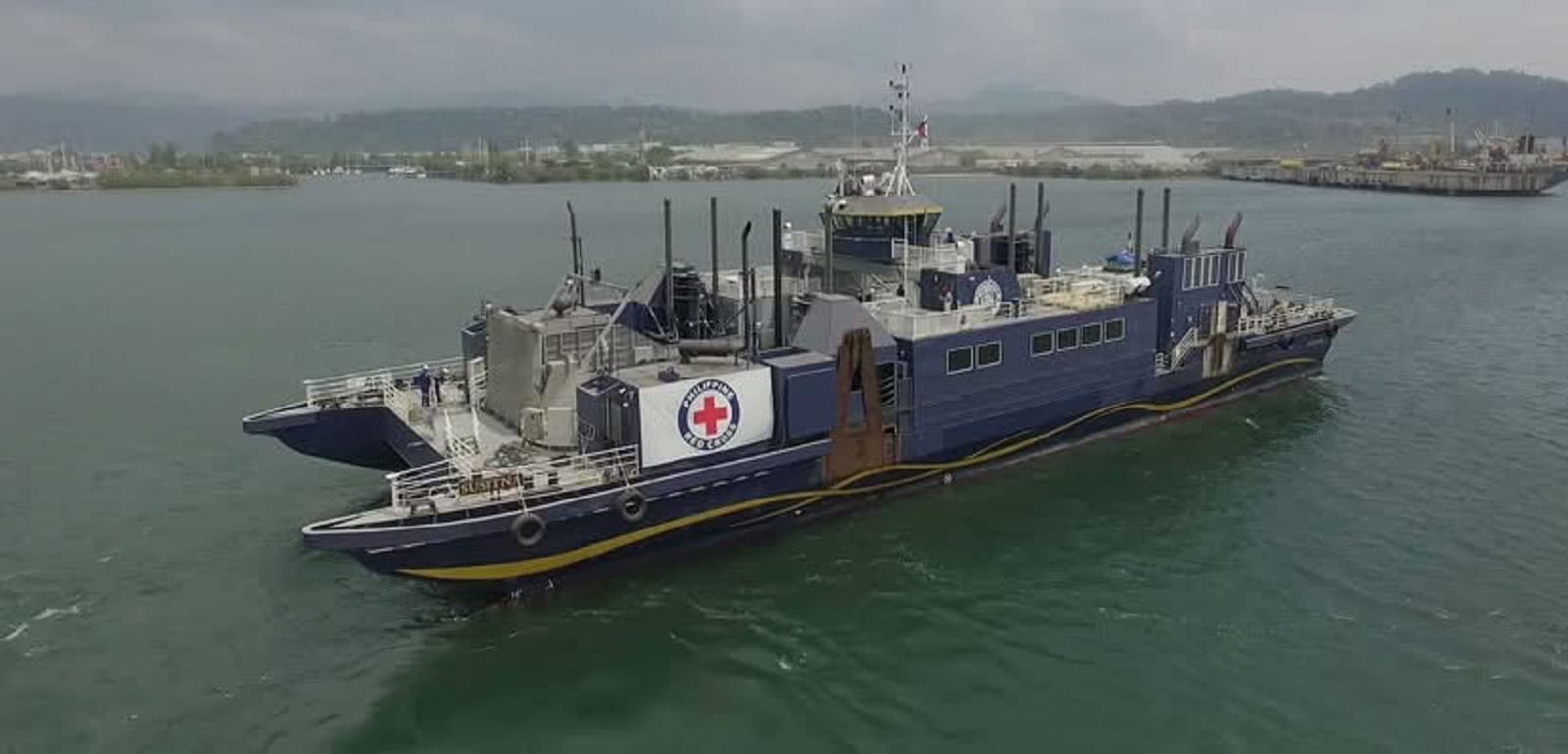
The ship as the MV Amazing Grace under the Philippine Red Cross

In September 2015, a deal was brokered with the Philippine Red Cross to purchase the ferry. The arrangement required that the ship first be repaired as three of its four engines were damaged by neglect and exposure during the time it had been stored without being used. The PRC originally found a need for a ship of its own when Typhoon Haiyan struck the Philippines back in 2013.

The ship was acquired by the PRC on June 30, 2016, for $1.75 million from Matanuska-Susitna Borough. The PRC raised funds for the purchase with the help of the International Federation of Red Cross and Red Crescent Societies, British Red Cross, German Red Cross, Japanese Red Cross, and American Red Cross.

In December 2016, MV Susitna arrived at Subic Bay in the Philippines for turnover to the PRC. As part of the organization's 70th anniversary activities in 2017, a contest was initiated to rename Susitna where, in the end, it became known as MV Amazing Grace.

Considered as the country's first humanitarian vessel, it was commissioned the same year in the presence of Philippine president Rodrigo Duterte. Its first deployment was on 2020 as part of PRC's disaster relief operations in the Philippine province of Catanduanes after being ravaged by Typhoon Rolly (Goni).

As the PRC shifted on relying on prepositioned supplies in regional hubs and warehouses for its disaster responses, the organization's reliance on maritime transport decreased.

=== BRP Amelia Gordon ===
The Philippine Coast Guard (PCG) has proposed to acquire its own hospital ship in 2020 and in 2025. The PCG approached the PRC and expressed interest to purchase MV Amazing Grace but PRC chief Richard Gordon insisted on donating the ship instead.

The Philippine Red Cross (PRC) donated the ship to the PCG on January 30, 2025. Amazing Grace was christened as BRP Amelia Gordon, after the mother of the PRC chief. Amelia Gordon was turned over to the PCG on March 20, 2025.
