= Boracay-class patrol boat =

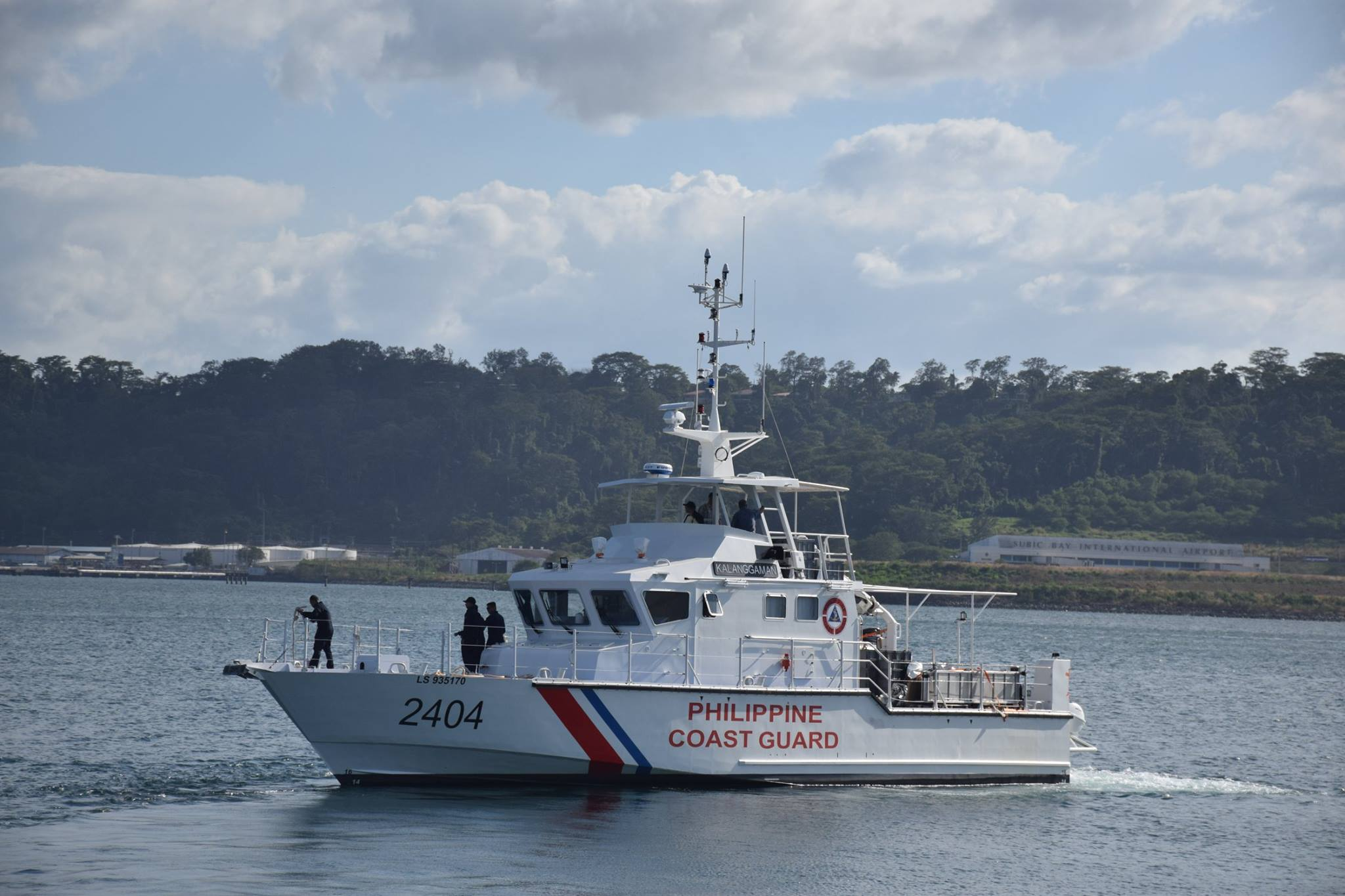
- BRP Kalanggaman (FPB-2404)

Class overview
- Builders: OCEA Shipbuilding, France
- Operators: Philippine Coast Guard
- Cost: UNKNOWN since the ₱5.6B contract price also included 1 large OPV BRP Gabriela Silang + 5-yr maintenance contract instead of the usual 2 yrs
- Planned: 4
- Completed: 4
- Active: 4

General characteristics
- Type: Patrol boat
- Displacement: 120 tons
- Length: 24 m (78 ft 9 in)
- Beam: 5.8 m (19 ft 0 in)
- Draught: 1.7 m (5 ft 7 in)
- Propulsion: 2 × 10V 2000 M72 MTU engines
- Speed: 28 knots (52 km/h; 32 mph)
- Range: 2,000 nmi (3,700 km; 2,300 mi) at 12 knots (22 km/h; 14 mph)
- Complement: 12
- Armament: .50 cal M2HB M2 Browning machine gun

The Boracay-class patrol boat is a series of four patrol boats built by OCEA of France for the Philippine Coast Guard based on the Ocea FPB 72 design. Based on their hull number prefix "FPB", they are officially classified as "fast patrol boats".

== Ships in class ==
Hull number	Name	Builder	Launched	Commissioned	Status
FPB-2401	Boracay	OCEA Shipbuilding	25 April 2018	15 October 2018	Active
FPB-2402	Panglao	OCEA Shipbuilding	4 June 2018	15 October 2018	Active
FPB-2403	Malamawi	OCEA Shipbuilding	10 July 2018	16 January 2019	Active
FPB-2404	Kalanggaman	OCEA Shipbuilding	13 August 2018	16 January 2019	Active
