= BRP Kalanggaman =

Philippine Coast Guard ship

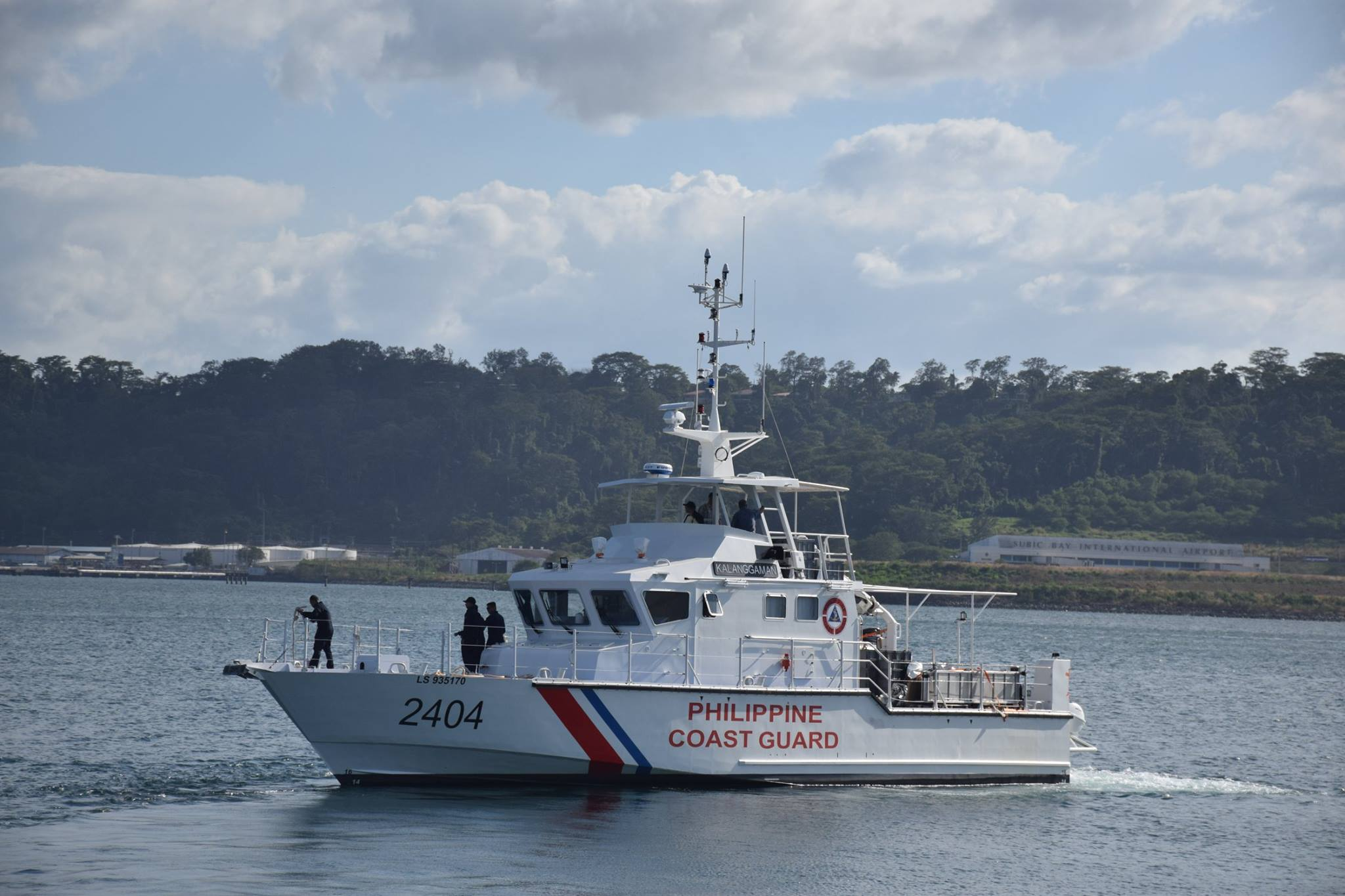
- BRP Kalanggaman sailing into Subic Bay in 2018.

History

Philippines
- Name: BRP Kalanggaman
- Builder: OCEA
- Launched: 13 August 2018
- Commissioned: 16 January 2019
- Identification: Hull number: FPB-2404
- Status: in active service

General characteristics
- Type: Patrol Boat (WPB)
- Displacement: 120 tons
- Length: 24 metres (79 ft)
- Beam: 5.8 metres (19 ft)
- Draught: 1.7 metres (5 ft 7 in)
- Propulsion: 2 x 10V 2000 M72 MTU engines
- Speed: 28 knots (52 km/h; 32 mph)
- Range: 800 nautical miles (1,500 km; 920 mi) at 21 knots (39 km/h; 24 mph); 2,000 nautical miles (3,700 km; 2,300 mi) at 12 knots (22 km/h; 14 mph)
- Complement: 12
- Armament: .50cal M2HB M2 Browning Machine Gun

BRP Kalanggaman (FPB-2404) is the last of four Boracay class Patrol Boats built by OCEA of France for the Philippine Coast Guard based on the Ocea FPB 72 design.

== Construction, delivery and commissioning ==
BRP Kalanggaman was launched in August 2018 at the OCEA site in Les Sables d’Olonne, France and was commissioned into service in Manila, Philippines in January 2019 along with her sister ship, BRP Malamawi (FPB 2403).
