= Datu Bago-class offshore patrol vessel =

Class of 40-meter offshore patrol vessel

Class overview
- Name: Datu Bago class
- Builders: Josefa Slipways Inc., Sual, Pangasinan, Philippines
- Operators: Philippine Coast Guard
- Planned: 2
- Active: 1

General characteristics
- Type: Multi-mission patrol vessel
- Length: 40.0 m (131 ft 3 in)
- Beam: 7.61 m (25 ft 0 in)
- Draft: 1.60 m (5 ft 3 in)
- Depth: 3.75 m (12 ft 4 in)
- Propulsion: 2 × diesel engines

The Datu Bago-class multi-mission offshore vessel is a new class of 40-meter offshore patrol vessel currently in service with the Philippine Coast Guard, after being transferred from the Bureau of Fisheries and Aquatic Resources (BFAR) in 2024.

The ships was constructed by Josefa Slipways Inc.'s shipyard in Sual, Pangasinan province in the Philippines, and its design was provided by Australian ship designer Incat Crowther.

The ships are designed to patrol Philippine waters and exclusive economic zone to protect against illegal fishing, and protection of marine resources. The ships will also assist the Philippine Coast Guard (PCG) in maritime patrol, and maritime law enforcement within Philippine waters and exclusive economic zone, as the ships are jointly crewed by personnel from the BFAR and PCG.

== Ships in class ==
| Hull number | Name | Builder | Launched | Commissioned | Status |
|---|---|---|---|---|---|
| MMOV-4093 | BRP Datu Bago | Josefa Slipways | | | Formerly known as MMOV-4001. The ship was transferred to the PCG on 2024. |
| MMOV-4002 | | Josefa Slipways | | | |
