= BRP Gabriela Silang =

Vessel of the Philippine Coast Guard

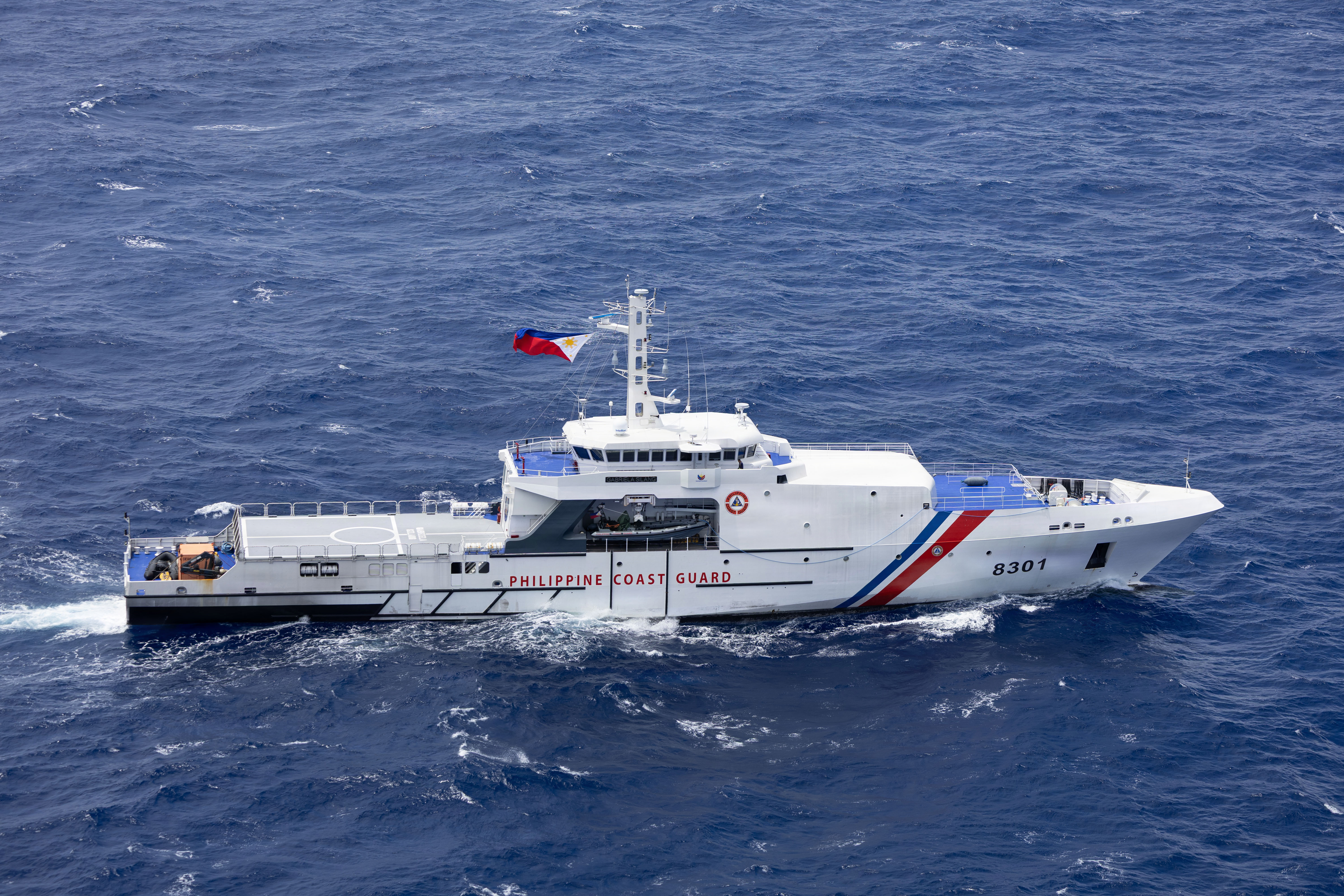
- BRP Gabriela Silang as it sails with other ships during RIMPAC 2026.

History

Philippines
- Name: BRP Gabriela Silang
- Namesake: María Josefa Gabriela Cariño de Silang
- Ordered: September 6, 2017
- Builder: OCEA S.A., Les Sables-d'Olonne, France
- Cost: UNKNOWN since the ₱5.6B contract price also includes 4 units 24-m fast patrol boats + 5-yr maintenance contract instead of the usual 2 yrs
- Launched: July 17, 2019
- Acquired: December 18, 2019
- Commissioned: April 13, 2020
- Identification: IMO number: 4724305; MMSI number: 548979500; Callsign: 4DFZ9; Hull number: OPV-8301

General characteristics
- Class & type: Gabriela Silang-class offshore patrol vessel
- Length: 83.6 m (274 ft)
- Beam: 16 m (52 ft)
- Draft: 3.5 m (11 ft)
- Propulsion: diesel-electric hybrid config; 2 × MTU 16V 4000 M73 diesel engines; 2 × Leroy-Somer electric motors
- Speed: 22 knots (41 km/h) maximum sustained
- Range: 8,000 nautical miles (14,800 km) at 15 knots
- Endurance: 5 weeks (35 Days)
- Boats & landing craft carried: 2 × Sillinger RHIBs
- Capacity: 500
- Complement: Current: 35; Maximum: 70 crew & personnel
- Sensors & processing systems: Nexeya's LYNCEA mission management system; Hensoldt-UK's SharpEye™ X-band (NATO I-band) & S-band (NATO E/F band) solid-state navigation & surface search radar suite; Optical: day-&-night cameras; Dedicated C2 (Command & Control) Room to function as flagship
- Aircraft carried: 1 × Airbus H145 helicopter
- Aviation facilities: Helideck for an 8.9-ton helicopter; Hangar for a 6-ton helicopter

BRP Gabriela Silang (OPV-8301) is an offshore patrol vessel of the Philippine Coast Guard. She is the first offshore patrol vessel and currently, the second largest and most modern vessel of the Philippine Coast Guard. Named after Gabriela Silang, a revolutionary leader during the Philippine struggle for independence from Spain. She was constructed by French shipbuilder OCEA S.A. based on the OPV-270 Mk II design, in Les Sables-d'Olonne, France.

== Construction and design ==
The offshore patrol vessel (OPV) was constructed by French shipbuilder OCEA S.A. under the "Philippine Ports and Coast Guard Capability Development" program of the Department of Transportation. She was based on the OPV-270 Mk II design. The deal worth P5.6 billion (€97 million at the time) was signed in September 2014.

The "base design specs" of OCEA OPV-270 includes a max speed of 20 to 30 knots, a cruising range of 4500 to 8000 nmi at 12 knots, a loiter time of 30 to 45 days.

Silang's actual specs however includes 8000 nmi cruising range at 15 knots (beyond OCEA's base design spec of 12) and can sail for up to 5 weeks (35 days) as confirmed by OCEA itself during EURONAVAL2020 Exhibition. These figures are also beyond her contractual specs: according to reports such as from philstarGlobal on 2019 July 18 which they cited the Philippine Coast Guard, Silang had a max speed of 20 knots and can sail (loiter time) for 22 days, but these reports were made before the sea trials, implying these belong to the specs according to contract only.

According to the Philippine Coast Guard (PCG), the OPV has a length of 83.6 meters and has a capacity of 64 crew members. She has a hybrid diesel-electric engine, a first for the PCG.

The OPV has a helideck and a hangar that can accommodate the Airbus H145 helicopter of the PCG. She also has a hyperbaric chamber for treating diving-related illnesses, as well as a survivor room equipped to accommodate rescued individuals.

On July 17, 2019, the OPV was launched at OCEA shipyard in Les Sables d’Olonne. She is the largest ship built at Les Sables d’Olonne as well as being the largest aluminum-hull OPV built in the world. On December 18, the PCG took possession of the offshore patrol vessel (OPV) from OCEA Shipyards at the occasion of a change of flag ceremony in Saint-Nazaire, France. The OPV departed France on December 30 with its 35-strong personnel and crew from the PCG.

== Operational history ==
=== Maiden cruise ===
On its way home to the Philippines after it left France on December 30, 2019, the OPV conducted a technical stopover in Malta, where the ship was asked to stand-by for instructions from the Philippine government as it was being considered to be deployed in the Middle East to evacuate Filipino citizens if an escalation of hostilities between the US and Iran happens.

The OPV then transferred to Catania, Sicily in Italy as it was also instructed to be on stand-by since the ongoing civil war in Libya as the country's capital Tripoli has been besieged, forcing Filipino embassy officials and workers to evacuate.

As the situation of Filipinos in Libya became better, the OPV was instructed to return home to the Philippines, passing through the Suez Canal in Egypt and conducting another technical stopover in Colombo, Sri Lanka. On April 6, 2020, the OPV entered Philippine waters for the first time.

The very next day, April 7, 2020, it proceeded to Manila where it was met by ships and aircraft from the Philippine Coast Guard off Manila Bay. Although the media was allowed to record its arrival in Manila, no ceremony was conducted due to the COVID-19 pandemic.

=== Commissioning ===
Secretary of Transportation Arthur Tugade and PCG Commandant, Adm. Joel Garcia led a private commissioning ceremony aboard the ship docked at Pier 15 in South Harbor. The event made the name BRP Gabriela Silang (OPV-8301) official. Restrictions on large gatherings because of the COVID-19 pandemic canceled the traditional ceremony for the new vessel.

During the height of the enhanced community quarantine amidst the COVID-19 pandemic, PCG used the BRP Gabriela Silang to ferry frontline health workers, medical supplies, PPE, and medicines to regional hospitals in the country.

On 4 March 2024, Gabriela Silang was deployed to the Batanes and Benham Rise areas after reports of Chinese presence in the area.

== Awards ==
On January 25, 2021, Gabriela Silang was awarded Best Large Patrol Boat by Baird Maritime's Work Boat World 2020 Awards. It details her size of 84×16 meter all-aluminium build (which was a world-first) yet performed excellently even during her very maiden voyage before being commissioned, responding to a civil war in Libya and tensions between the US and Iran in the Middle East by repatriating OFWs; her contribution to COP21 Paris Agreement; being tailor-made to a vast archipelagic tropical environment; among others.

== Gallery ==
BRP Gabriela Silang (OPV-8301)

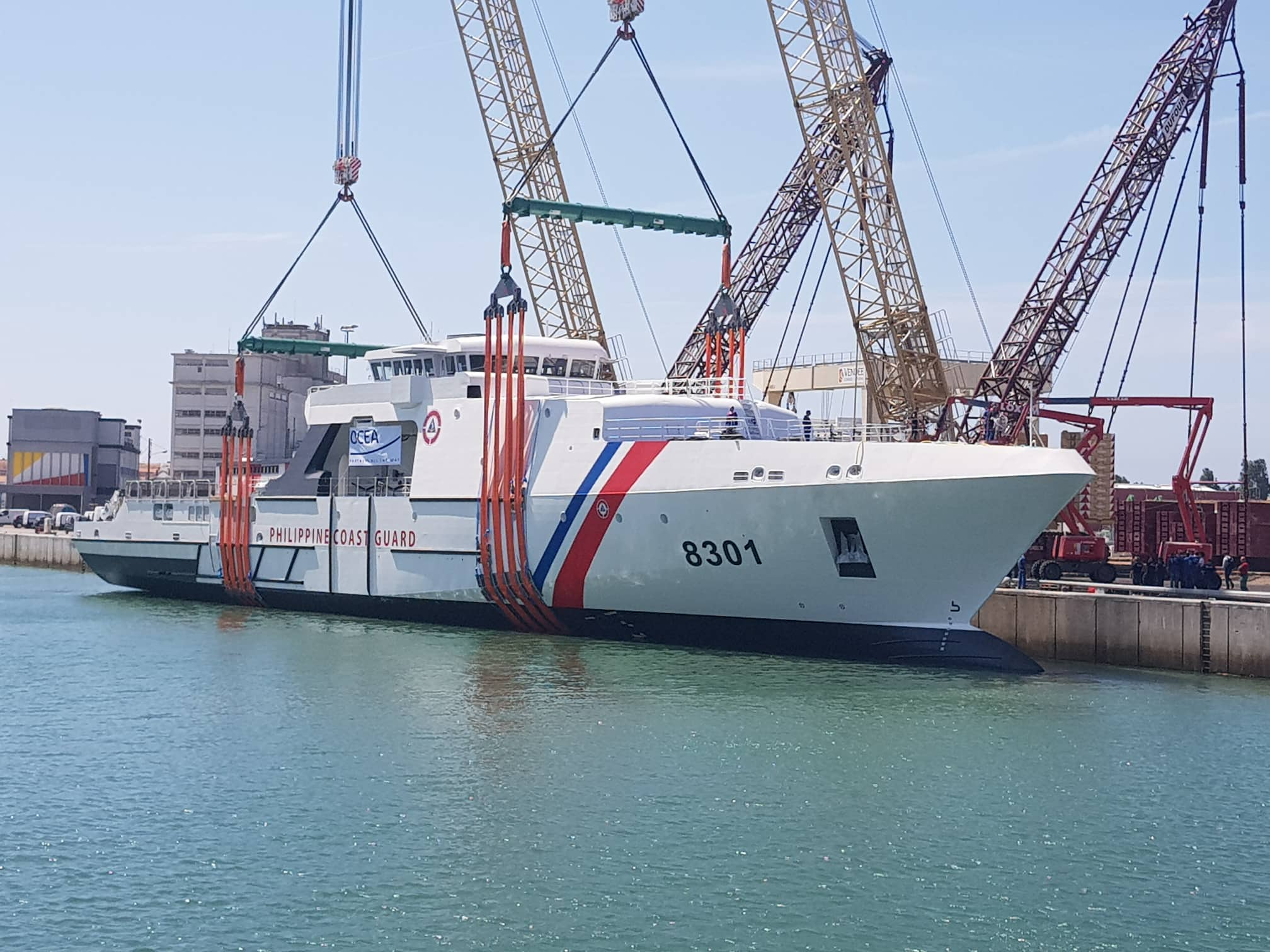
BRP Gabriela Silang during its launching in OCEA Shipyard, France.

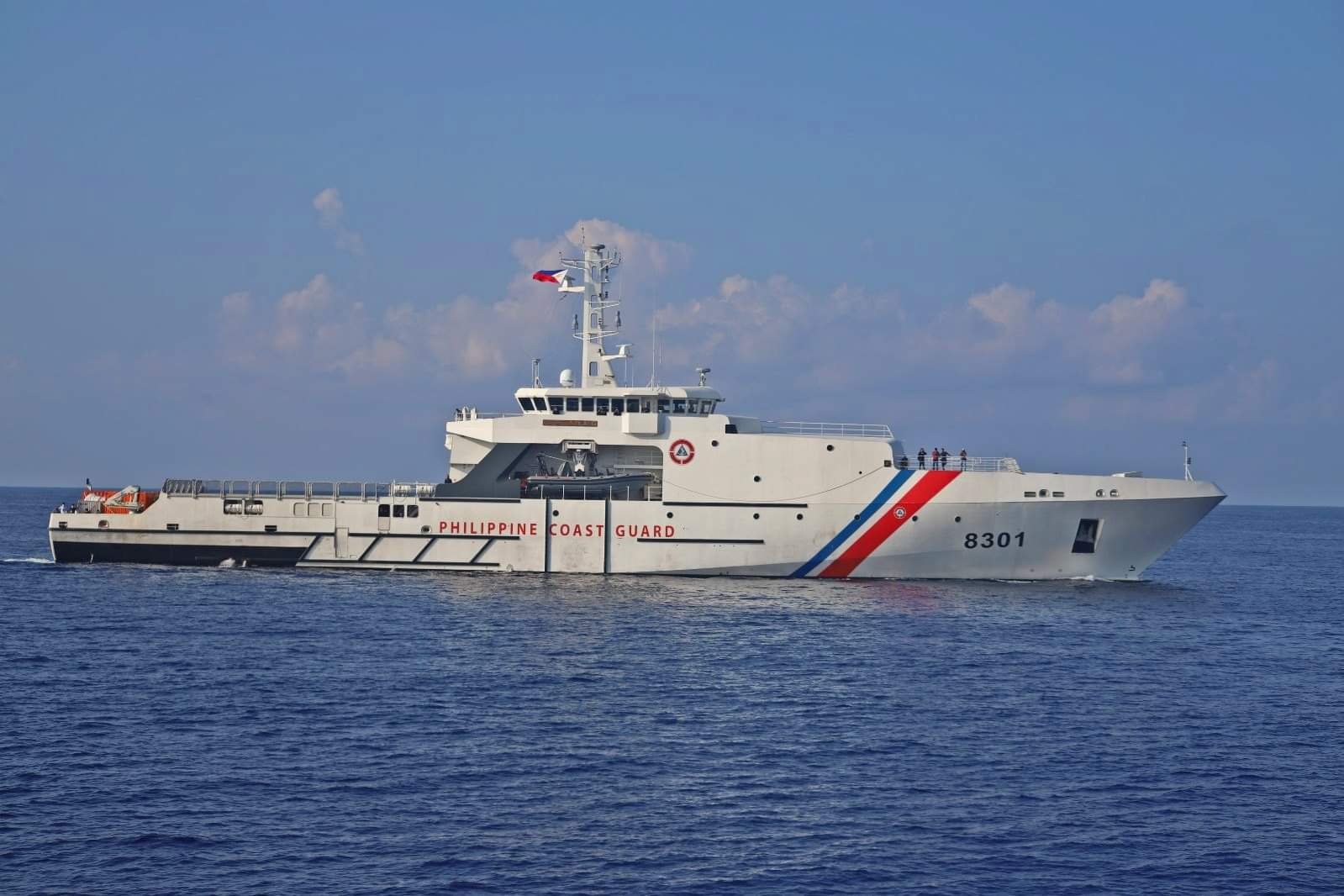
BRP Gabriela Silang (OPV-8301) as it sails home to the Philippines.

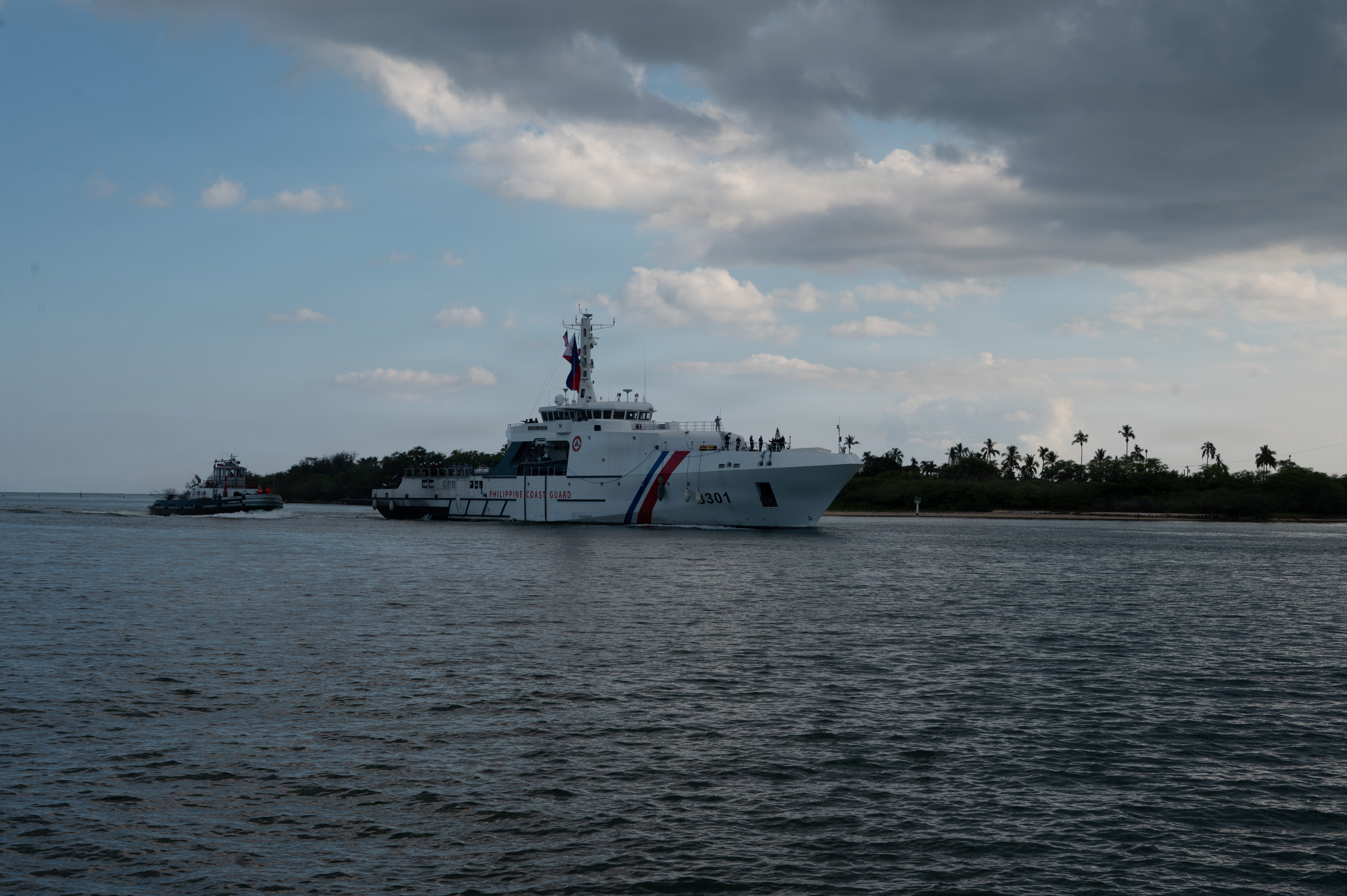
BRP Gabriela Silang arrives at Pearl Harbor for RIMPAC 2026
