= Gabriela Silang =

Ilocano rebel against Spain (1731–1763)

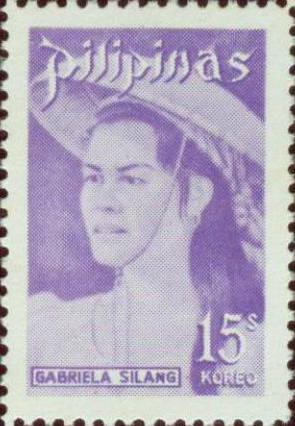
- Gabriela Silang on a 1974 stamp of the Philippines
- Born: Maria Josefa Gabriela Cariño; March 19, 1731; Bangued, Abra, Captaincy General of the Philippines, Spanish Empire
- Died: September 20, 1763 (aged 32); Vigan, Ilocos, Captaincy General of the Philippines, Spanish Empire
- Cause of death: Execution by hanging
- Other names: Nam Nama; La Generala; Joan of Arc of Ilocandia
- Spouses: Tomás Millan (m. 1751; died 1754) Diego Silang (m. 1757; died 1763)
- Father: Anselmo Cariño

Maria Josefa Gabriela Cariño Silang (Tagalog: [siˈlaŋ]; March 19, 1731 – September 20, 1763) was a Filipino military leader best known for her role as the female leader of the Ilocano independence movement from Spain. She took over from her second husband Diego Silang after his assassination in 1763, leading her people for four months before she was captured and executed by the colonial government of the Captaincy General of the Philippines.

== Early life ==
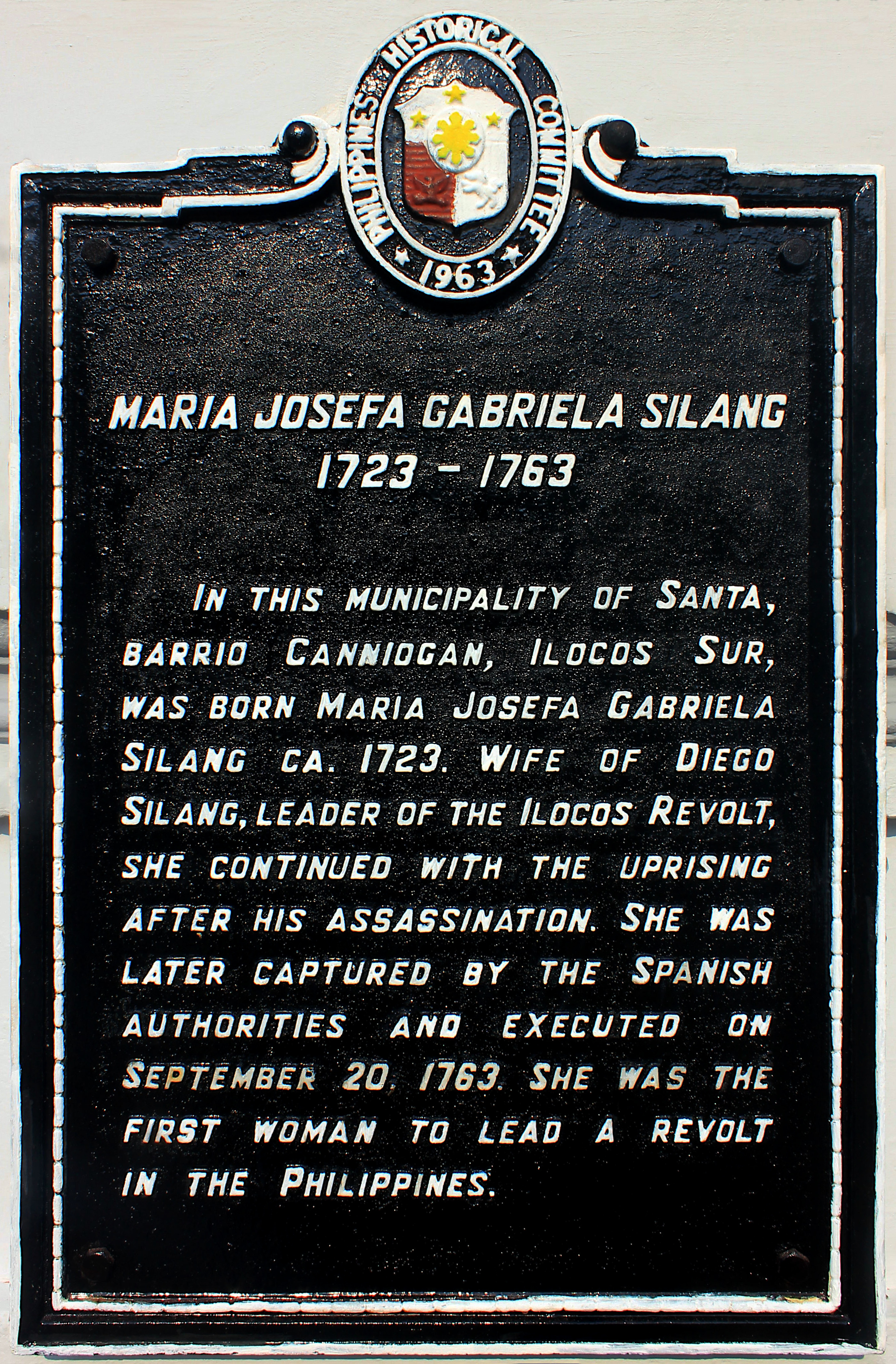
National historical marker installed in 1963 in Silang's hometown of Santa

Gabriela Silang was born in barrio Caniogan, Santa, Ilocos to a Spanish Ilocano father named Anselmo Cariño, a trader who ferried his wares from Vigan to Abra along the Abra River and a descendant of Ignacio Cariño, the first Galician from Spain to arrive in Candon in the late 17th century. Her mother was a Tinguian who was from a Tinguian barrio in San Quintin (now Pidigan, Abra).

She received a Catholic upbringing from the town's parish priest, and attained elementary level education at the town's convent school. After being separated from her parents early in her childhood, she was raised by a priest, who eventually arranged a marriage between her and the wealthy businessman. They married in 1751, and he died three years later.

== Revolutionary involvement ==
=== Relationship with her spouse, Diego Silang ===
After being widowed by her first husband, Gabriela met future insurgent leader Diego Silang and married him in 1757.

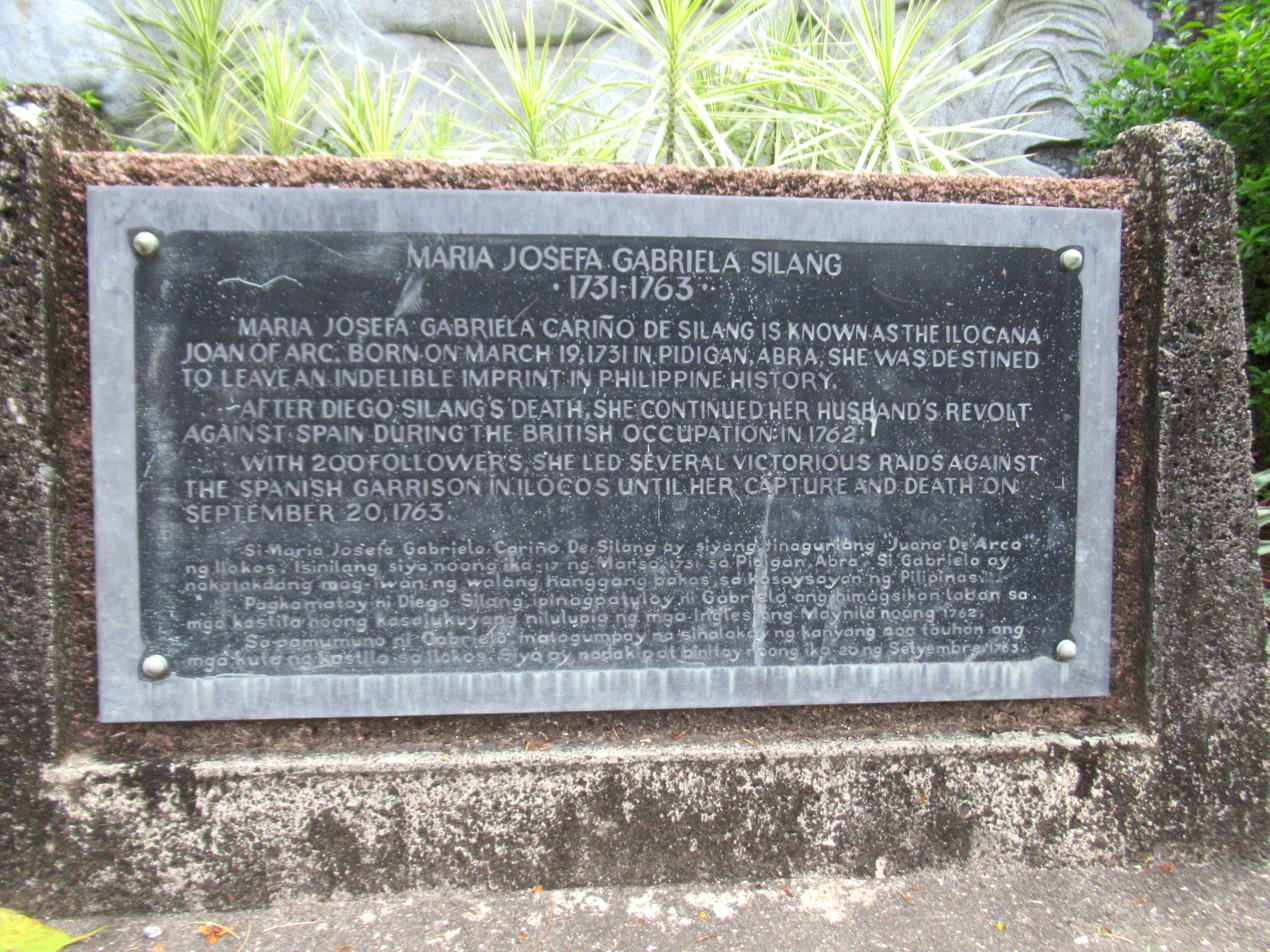
Silang memorial marker at the Himlayang Pilipino Memorial Park (Quezon City).

In 1762, as part of what would later be known as the Seven Years' War, the Kingdom of Great Britain declared war on Spain, and captured Manila, resulting in the British occupying the city and nearby Cavite. After the capture of Manila, an emboldened Diego sought to initiate an armed struggle to overthrow Spanish functionaries in Ilocos and replace them with native-born officials. He joined forces with the British, who appointed him governor of Ilocos on their behalf. During this revolt, Gabriela became one of Diego's closest advisors and his unofficial aide-de-camp during skirmishes with Spanish troops. She was also a major figure in her husband's co-operation with the British.

Spanish authorities retaliated by offering a reward for Diego’s assassination. Consequently, his two former allies, Miguel Vicos and Pedro Becbec, killed him in Vigan on May 28, 1763.

=== Revolutionary leadership in Tayum ===
After Diego's murder, Gabriela fled to Tayum, now part of Abra, to seek refuge in the house of her paternal uncle, Nicolás Cariño. There, she appointed her first two generals, Miguel Flores and Tagabuen Infiel. She later assumed her husband's role as commander of the rebel troops and achieved a "priestess" status amongst her community and followers. Her popular image as the bolo-wielding La Generala on horseback stems from this period.

=== Assault on Vigan and execution ===
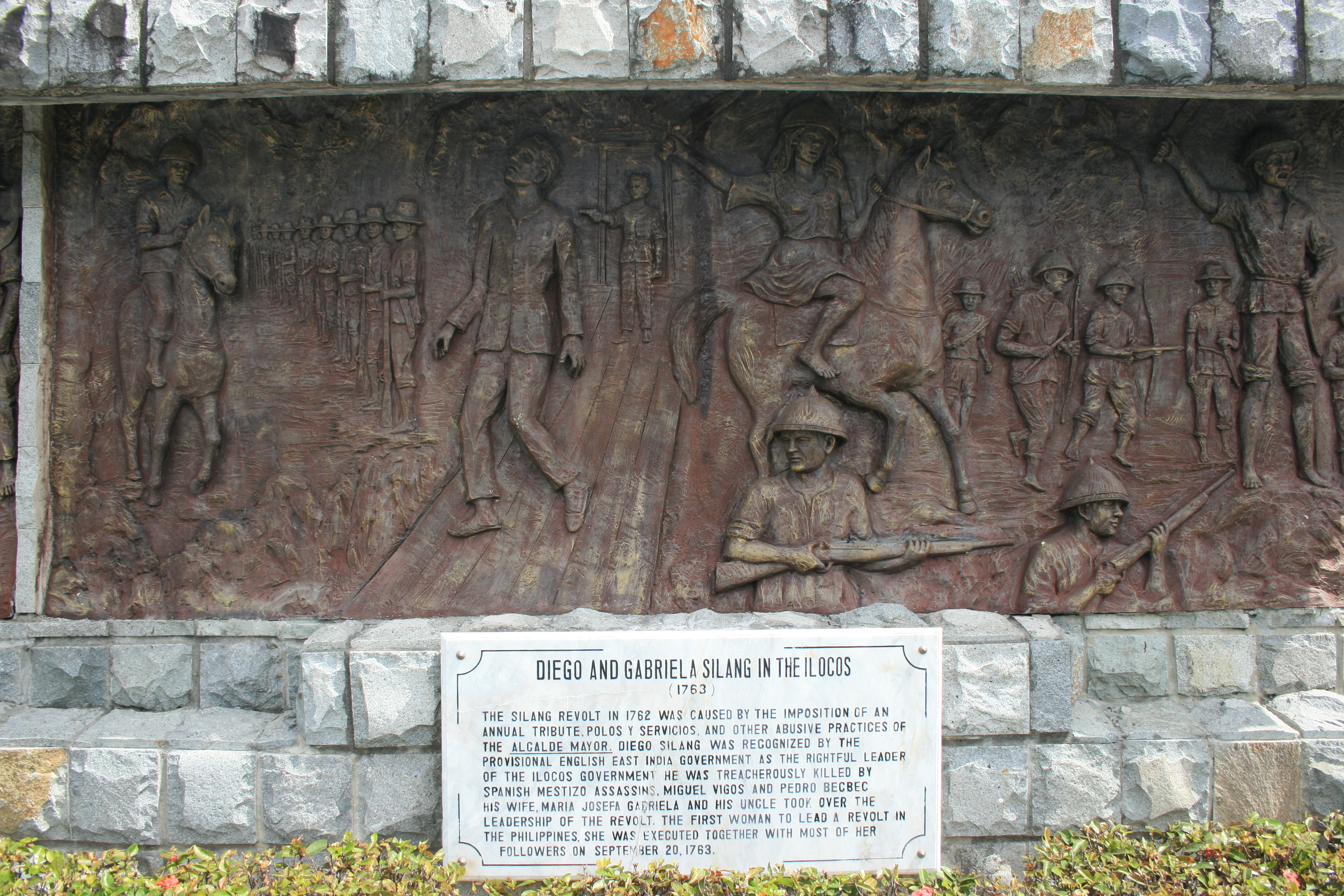
Silang revolt monument in Corregidor

On September 10, 1763, Silang attempted to besiege Vigan but the Spanish retaliated, forcing her into hiding. She retreated once more to Abra, where the Spanish later captured her. On September 20, 1763, Silang and her troops were executed by hanging in Vigan's central plaza.

== Legacy ==
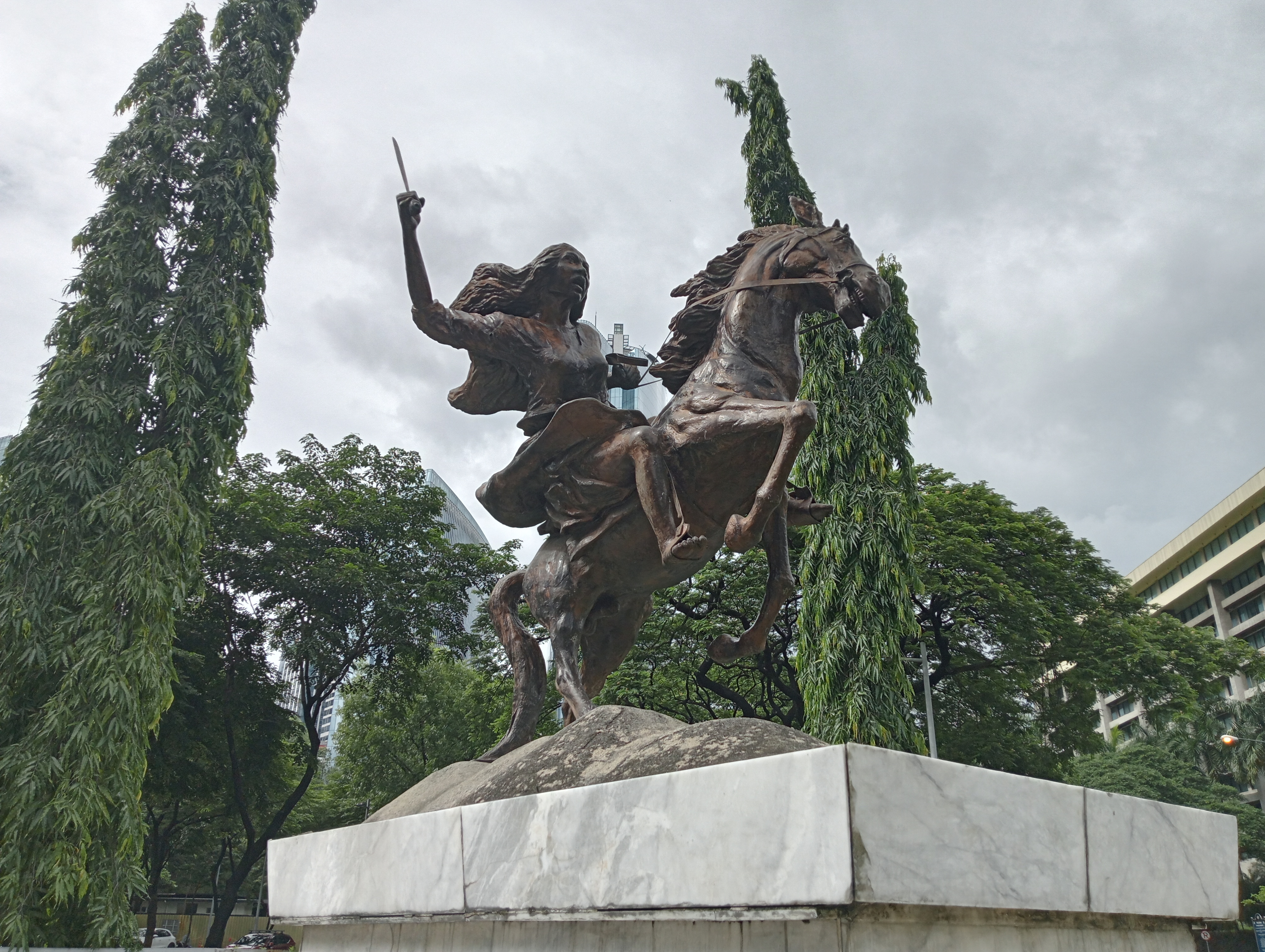
Gabriela Silang monument in Makati

She is remembered as the “Joan of Arc of Ilocandia” The Order of Gabriela Silang is the sole third class national decoration awarded by the Philippines whose membership is restricted to women. The organisation and party list Gabriela Women's Party ("General Assembly Binding Women for Reforms, Integrity, Equality, Leadership, and Action"), which advocates for women's rights and issues, was founded in April 1984 in her honour. The BRP Gabriela Silang (OPV-8301) is named after her. Asteroid 7026 Gabrielasilang, discovered by Eleanor Helin at Palomar in 1993, is named in her honor. The official naming citation was published by the Minor Planet Center on November 8, 2019 (M.P.C. 118218).

== In popular culture ==
- Silang was portrayed by Leila Morena in the 1951 film, Diego Silang.
- Silang was portrayed by Armida Siguion-Reyna in the 1975 musical, Dung-aw.
- Silang was portrayed by Tanya Gomez in the 1996 ABS-CBN educational television series Bayani in the two-episode "Gabriela Silang: Ang Alap" and "Diego Silang: Ang Sulat."
- Silang was portrayed by Kris Bernal in the 2013 GMA Network historical drama series Indio and by Glaiza de Castro in the GMA News TV television romance anthology Wagas.
- Silang will be portrayed by theater actress Gab Pangilinan in the upcoming original musical Gabriela: The Musical set to be staged at Hyundai Hall, Areté in Quezon City from November 13 to December 6, 2026.
