= Rommel Supangan =

Filipino admiral

31st Commandant of the Philippine Coast Guard
- Incumbent
- Assumed office 19 October 2026
- President: Bongbong Marcos
- Preceded by: Ronnie Gil Gavan

Personal details
- Born: Rommel Agsaullo Supangan Philippines
- Education: Philippine Military Academy (B.S); World Maritime University (M.M.A)

Military service
- Branch/service: Philippine Coast Guard
- Years of service: 1995 - Present
- Rank: Admiral
- Unit: Commandant of the Philippine Coast Guard; Maritime Environmental Protection Command; Coast Guard Fleet; Coast Guard Strategic Studies and International Affairs Center; Coast Guard Human Resource Management Command; Coast Guard District Palawan

Rommel Agsaullo Supangan is a Filipino admiral who serves as the incumbent commandant of the Philippine Coast Guard since 19 October 2026. Supangan's former assignments include the Maritime Environmental Protection Command from February 2026 to October 2026 while being subsequently serving as commander of the Coast Guard Fleet from June 2025 to October 2026, and Coast Guard District Palawan.

Supangan is a graduate of the Philippine Military Academy (PMA) "Marilag" Class of 1995 and also holds a Master of Science in Maritime Affairs, major in Marine Environment and Ocean Management from the World Maritime University in Malmo, Sweden.

== Early life and education ==
Supangan came from a military family. His father is retired Navy Ensign Alejandro R. Supangan, and his mother is Bety Supangan. He later entered the Philippine Military Academy (PMA) in 1991, where he took up Bachelor of Science degree in Naval System Engineering, and later graduated as part of the "Marilag" Class of 1995. He also finished his Master of Science in Maritime Affairs, major in Marine Environment and Ocean Management from the World Maritime University in Malmo, Sweden as a Sasakawa Fellow of the Nippon Foundation.

== Career ==
After Supangan's graduation in the PMA in 1995 as a newly minted ensign of the Philippine Coast Guard, he was assigned under various patrol ships under the Coast Guard and the Bureau of Fisheries and Aquatic Resources (BFAR). Supangan later skippered five Coast Guard capital ships and two BFAR patrol boats, and later received his command-at-sea badge. He later served as the district commander of Coast Guard District Palawan.

Supangan was also named as the deputy commander of the Maritime Safety Services Command and later as acting commander of Coast Guard District NCR–Central Luzon. He later served as commander of the Coast Guard Fleet from June 2025 to October 2026, and subsequently served as the acting director of the Coast Guard Strategic Studies and International Affairs Center from June 2025 to February 2026. Supangan later served as the commander of the Maritime Environmental Protection Command from February 2026 to October 2026 while retaining his position as commander of the Coast Guard Fleet, and was later promoted to the rank of vice admiral on 28 July 2026. During his stint as commander of the Maritime Environmental Protection Command, Supangan implemented a unified operational framework and doctrine developments through the implementation of Doctrine Development and Review Workshops to strengthen operational effectiveness and effective decision making at all levels. Supangan also later strengthened good governance initiatives and drove the command's "Vision 2040" framework towards becoming a capable, responsive, and recognized maritime environmental protection organization.

On 19 October 2026, Supangan was named as the 31st Commandant of the Philippine Coast Guard, and replaced retiring Admiral Ronnie Gil Gavan. During his assumption speech, Supangan stated that his leadership will be anchored on a "definitive command" philosophy, built upon four core strategic pillars: institutional transformation and good governance; strengthening effective maritime governance; modernization and capability building; and strategic partnerships and cooperation. He also vowed to continue conducting maritime patrols to assert the country's sovereign rights.

== Awards and decorations in Coast Guard ==
- Coast Guard Distinguished Service Medal
- Distinguished Coast Guard Cross
- Coast Guard Outstanding Achievement Medal
- Coast Guard Superior Achievement Medal
- Coast Guard Bronze Cross Medal
- Coast Guard Search and Rescue Medal
- Coast Guard Merit Medal
- Military Merit Medal
- Coast Guard Commendation Medal
- Military Commendation Medal
- Coast Guard Civic Action Medal
- Military Civic Action Medal
- Coast Guard Long Service Medal
- Coast Guard Anti-dissidence Campaign Medal
- Coast Guard Luzon Anti-Dissidence Campaign Medal
- Coast Guard Visayas Anti-Dissidence Campaign Medal
- Coast Guard Mindanao Anti-Dissidence Campaign Medal
- Coast Guard Disaster Response Ribbon
- AFP Disaster Relief and Rehabilitation Operations Ribbon

=== Unit decorations ===
- Philippine Republic Presidential Unit Citation
- Commandant's Unit Citation
- Coast Guard Efficiency Ribbon
- Coast Guard Meritorious Unit Ribbon

=== Badges ===
- Coast Guard Command-at-Sea Badge
- Coast Guard Commandant's Badge

== Personal life ==
Supangan is married to Christine Supangan and they 2 daughters and a son.
