= Philippine Coast Guard =

Coast guard of the Philippines

Philippine Coast Guard Tanod Baybayin ng Pilipinas
- Official Seal

- Racing stripe

- Flag Ensign
- Abbreviation: PCG
- Motto: "Saving Lives"

Agency overview
- Formed: October 10, 1967; 59 years ago (as the Philippine Coast Guard); October 26, 1905 – December 19, 1913 (as Bureau of Coast Guard and Transportation); October 17, 1901 – October 26, 1905 (as Bureau of Navigation)
- Employees: 36,000 active personnel
- Annual budget: ₱42.51 billion (US$723.77 million) (2026)

Jurisdictional structure
- Operations jurisdiction: Philippines
- Legal jurisdiction: Philippine Maritime Zone, International Waters
- Primary governing body: Government of the Philippines
- Secondary governing body: Department of Transportation
- Constituting instrument: Coast Guard Law of 2009 (Republic Act 9993)
- Specialist jurisdiction: Coastal patrol, marine border protection, marine search and rescue

Operational structure
- Headquarters: National Headquarters Philippine Coast Guard, Port Area, Manila, Philippines
- Agency executives: Pres. Bongbong Marcos, Commander-in-Chief; Vince B. Dizon, Secretary of Transportation (Acting); CG Admiral Rommel Supangan, Commandant of the Philippine Coast Guard
- Parent agency: Department of Transportation (2016–present); Department of Transportation and Communications (1998–2016); Department of National Defense (1967–1998); Department of Commerce and Police (1901–1913)

Facilities
- Patrol Vessels: 21(+1)
- Support Ships: 4
- Auxiliary Boats: 469
- Aircraft: Britten-Norman Islander; Cessna 208 Caravan; Piper PA-31 Navajo
- Helicopters: Airbus Helicopters H145

Notables
- Significant operations: Spratly Islands dispute; Scarborough Shoal standoff; Battle of Marawi

Website
- coastguard.gov.ph

The Philippine Coast Guard (PCG; Filipino: Tanod Baybayin ng Pilipinas) is the third armed uniformed service of the country attached to the Philippines' Department of Transportation, tasked primarily with enforcing laws within Philippine waters, conducting maritime security operations, safeguarding life and property at sea, and protecting marine environment and resources; similar to coast guard units around the world. In case of a declaration of war, the Coast Guard shall also serve as an attached service of the Department of National Defense.

It currently maintains a presence throughout the archipelago, with sixteen Coast Guard Districts, fifty-four CG Stations and over one hundred ninety Coast Guard Sub-Stations, from Basco, Batanes to Bongao, Tawi-Tawi.

== History ==
=== Colonial era history ===
The Philippine Coast Guard is the oldest and only humanitarian armed service in the Philippines. Its beginnings could be traced back to the early 20th century when coast guarding was related to the protection of the customs services of the country and in patrolling the coastlines and harbors.

When the Americans came in 1898, one of the first steps that the military government undertook was the reopening of the port and customs facilities of Manila. Soon after, the civilian Insular Government, through the Philippine Commission, enacted a law on October 17, 1901, that created the Bureau of Coast Guard and Transportation, which was placed under the Department of Commerce and Police. The Captain of the Port was designated as Bureau Director.

Recognition of the difficulty of administering such a vast island area without reliable government transportation resulted in the requirements to establish a transportation system for government services. The resulting report recommended purchase of 21 small steamers to establish 21 circuits supporting communication between provincial capitals and coastal towns as well as prevent smuggling and landing contraband. The average circuit would be . 651 mi (566 nmi; 1,048 km). The vessels required should be all weather of about 140 ft (42.7 m) in length capable of 10 kn (12 mph; 19 km/h) with light armament. Two small stern paddle steamers were recommended for river use on the Cayagen River and the Rio Grande de Mindanao and connected lakes. The bureau concentrated its early days on the contracts for the fifteen vessels with the result ten were to be built by Farnham, Boyd & Company in Shanghai, China and five by Uraga Dock Company in Uraga, Japan.

The ten Chinese contracted cutters were Balabac, Basilan, Busuanga, Corregidor, Luzon, Masbate, Negros, Palawan, Polillo, and Tablas. The five Uraga cutters were to be Marinduque and Romblon, which were delivered, and Bohol, Cebu, and Jolo which were cancelled after serious deficiencies were found on delivery of Marinduque and Romblon. The China built cutters began arriving in Manila by mid 1902 and were found to generally meet requirements. The Uraga built cutters, arriving in January and April 1903, had serious defects, to the extent the inspector in Japan was dismissed for negligence, and costly negotiations led to cancellation of the three others that were in process of completion. Five additional cutters were ordered from China, those being Leyte, Mindanao, Mindoro, Panay, and Samar.

The lighthouse service was placed under the Bureau. In 1902, the Coast Guard fleet of 15 steamers from China and Japan was established and were assigned for the lighthouse service inspection trips of top government officials, for transport to Culion Island, for patrolling against illegal entry of aliens, and for troop movement of the Philippine Constabulary.

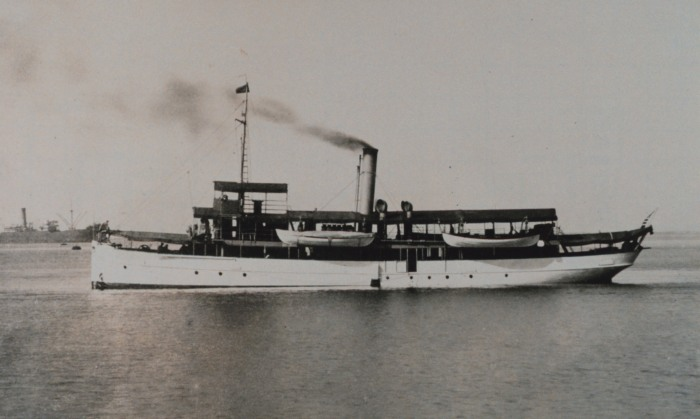
Marinduque as USC&GS survey vessel.

The Bureau of Coast Guard and Transportation was abolished on October 26, 1905, and the Bureau of Navigation took over its functions. The Bureau of Navigation was authorized to create a commissioned and enlisted service, and to adopt its own manual of court martial patterned after the US Navy.

Subsequently, however, the Bureau was also abolished on December 19, 1913, and the organization and its functions were transferred to the Bureau of Customs and the Bureau of Public Works until the establishment of the Commonwealth Government.

=== Postwar era history ===
After gaining independence from the United States shortly after the end of World War II, the Philippine government transferred some of the coast guard functions, such as the revenue cutter and lighthouse services, to the Philippine Naval Patrol, which eventually became the Philippine Navy. A Coast Guard unit was activated within the Philippine Navy to implement these functions.

On August 6, 1967, the Philippine Congress enacted Republic Act 5173 of the Philippine Coast Guard Law, which made the PCG a major unit of the Philippine Navy under a flag officer. The PCG was activated on October 10, 1967, and its coast guard functions were transferred from the navy proper.

=== Contemporary history ===
The civilian nature of the PCG functions led to the separation of the Coast Guard from the Philippine Navy on March 30, 1998, by virtue of Executive Order 475 signed by President Fidel Ramos. The Order effectively transferred the PCG from the Department of National Defense to the Office of the President, and eventually to the Department of Transportation and Communications (DOTC) on April 15, 1998, by virtue of Executive Order 477.

These executive orders provided inter alia that the PCG shall continue to be the agency primarily responsible for the promotion of safety of life and property at sea and the protection of the maritime environment as mandated under the Philippine Coast Guard Law and Presidential Decrees 600, 601, 602, and 979, as a mended.

The transformation of the PCG into a non-military organization has a tremendous impact and significance. Its civilian character has allowed it to receive offers of vessels, equipment, technology, services, cooperation and other needed assistance from other countries, something which would not be readily offered to a military agency.

With enactment of Republic Act 9993, also known as the Coast Guard Law of 2009, as well as its implementing rules and regulations, the PCG has been vested with the necessary authority and responsibility to perform preventive measures in ensuring the safety of merchant vessels. The new law also strengthened PCG's authority to meet new challenges and increasing demands for marine resources, technological advancement and climate change. Further, the law has defined the PCG's rightful niche in the bureaucracy as the premier maritime agency and its vital role in nation building.

On April 10, 2026, the Philippines opened a major coast guard district base on Thitu Island (Pag-asa) in the disputed South China Sea to strengthen sovereignty and protect local communities. The move highlights Manila's assertion of control amid frequent Chinese patrols and tensions in the Spratly Islands, despite the 2016 arbitration ruling invalidating Beijing's expansive territorial claims.

==== Religion ====
The Virgin Mary as Our Lady of Peace and Good Voyage is officially the patron of the PCG. Its head chaplain Fr. Lowie Palines received from Antipolo Cathedral Parish Priest-Rector Fr. Reynante "Nante" Unidad Tolentino, ACSP President, his requested 2 replicas of the Marian image. The PCG will hold processions thereof in all its headquarters. The second image will also be permanently installed by Bishop Oscar Jaime Florencio of the Military Ordinariate of the Philippines at Pag-asa Island's Catholic chapel.

== Organization ==
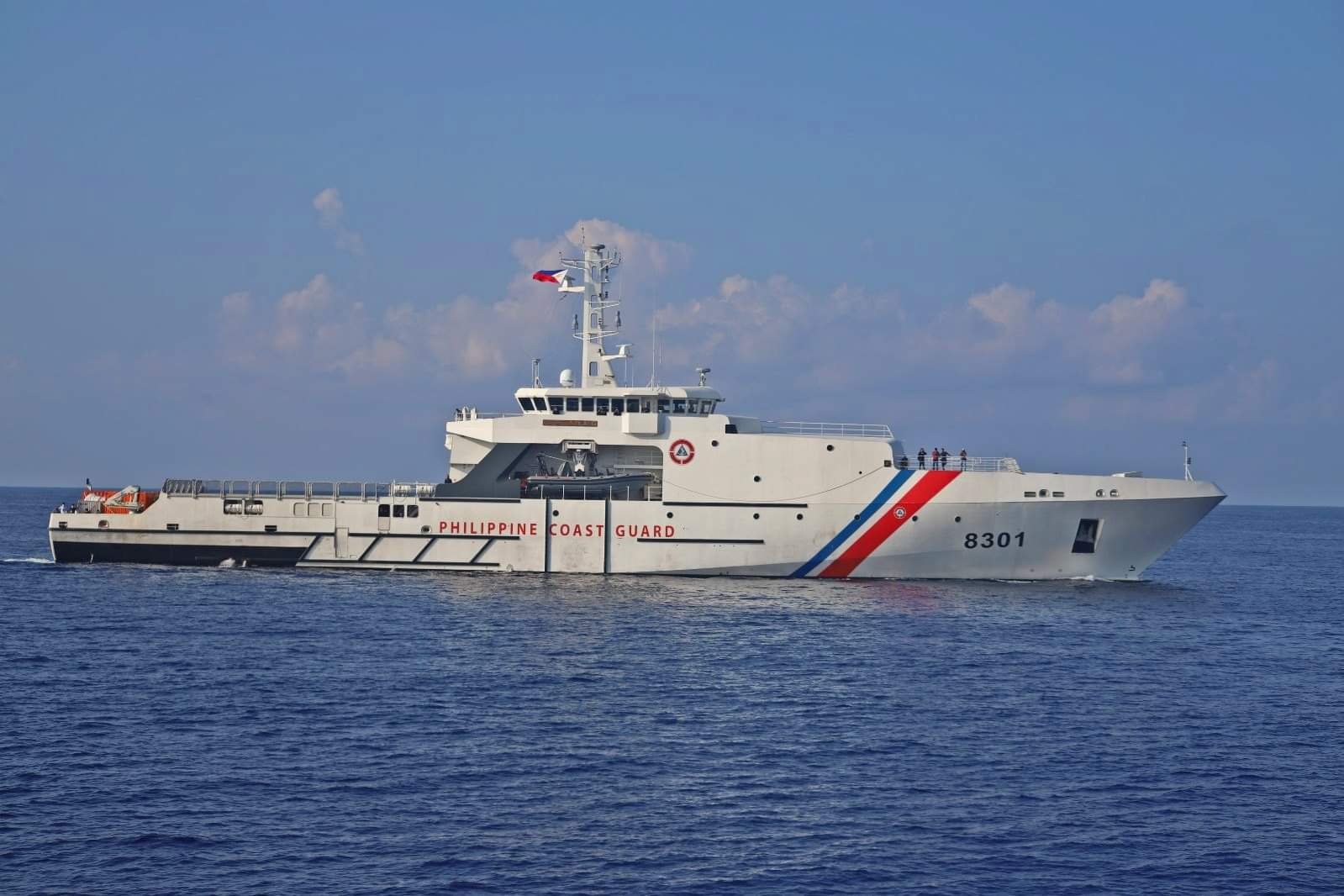
BRP Gabriela Silang (OPV-8301)

The Philippine Coast Guard is led by the Commandant of the Philippine Coast Guard, and directly reports to the Secretary of Transportation in maritime law enforcement, and also reports to the Secretary of National Defense in wartime. The Commandant is assisted by the Deputy Commandant for Administration and the Deputy Commandant for Operations, both holders of the rank of Vice Admiral, and the Chief of Coast Guard Staff, who holds the rank of Rear Admiral, and serves as the principal staff adviser and chief coordinator between the headquarters staff functions, the Central Directorial Staff, and overall policy-making matters. The Headquarters, Philippine Coast Guard is also assisted by the Central Directorial Staff, which is tasked to assist the headquarters on specialized organization-wide policies and operational commands. The Coast Guard currently consists of three main functional commands, and is also supported by support commands, Coast Guard Districts, and the Philippine Coast Guard Auxiliary.

== Leadership ==
- Commander-in-Chief: Pres. Bongbong Marcos
- Secretary of Transportation (SoTr): Giovanni Z. Lopez (Acting Secretary)
  - Undersecretary for Maritime, DOTr: Elmer Francisco U. Sarmiento
- Presidential Adviser on the West Philippine Sea: Sec. Andres C. Centino
- Commandant, Philippine Coast Guard (Comdt, PCG): CG Admiral Rommel A. Supangan
- Deputy Commandant for Administration: CG VADM Hostillo Arturo E. Cornelio
- Deputy Commandant for Operations: CG VADM Edgar L. Ybañez
- Chief of Coast Guard Staff: CG COMMO Philipps Soria
- Spokesperson, Philippine Coast Guard: COMMO Noemie Guirao-Cayabyab PCG

=== Commandant of the Philippine Coast Guard ===
The Commandant of the Philippine Coast Guard is the service branch's highest-ranking officer who serves as the overall head of the entire Philippine Coast Guard. The position is usually held by a four-star rank of Admiral and has full authority, command and oversight of the entire service branch. The commandant has full control on the Coast Guard's operational command and is responsible for the Coast Guard's activities, policies, and administrative functions, which includes the service branch's maritime policies, maritime environmental protection, maritime search-and-rescue missions, maritime law enforcement missions, counter-terrorism operations and transportation security missions. The commandant is also responsible for maintaining the coast guard's situational preparedness and gives both guidance and direction to all coast guard units, which includes all coast guard commands, stations, and units. The commandant is also tasked to lead the coast guard's long-term strategic planning strategies towards meeting its future needs and visions, which includes the coast guard's modernization plans, asset acquisition plans, and strategic doctrines to meet the service branch's roles. The commandant is also in charge for disaster preparedness missions and deployments for humanitarian assistance and disaster relief (HADR) operations and for boosting collaborations and partnerships with other service branches such as the Armed Forces of the Philippines, the Philippine National Police and other uniformed services for both land-based and maritime security preparations, as well as forging partnerships to foreign coast guard counterparts.

The commandant also reports directly to the Secretary of Transportation for transportation-related and peacetime matters, and only reports to the Secretary of National Defense for maritime security-related matters and wartime matters, and works in collaboration with the National Security Council. Upon the signing of the Republic Act No. 12122 on February 18, 2025, the commandant will serve their tenure on their post under a fixed 3-year term and will only be terminated if the commandant's term expires or under the President's pleasure, and allows the commandant to maintain stability and efficiency in their post. The new law also exempts the commandant on the service's retirement age of 56 or within 30 years of service, whichever comes earlier, and shall not exceed the age of 60. Additional requirements for the appointment of the position of commandant is still retained, which consists of being awarded the Command-at-Sea Badge and for serving as a commander of a Coast Guard District.

The commandant is assisted by three deputies in their post; namely the Deputy Commandant for Operations, who supervises all Coast Guard operations and functions; the Deputy Commandant for Administration, who is in charge of managing administrative functions and even assists in human resource management, personnel management and resource maangement; and the Chief of Coast Guard Staff, who assists the commandant in overseeing the coast guard's staff functions and commands. The Deputy Commandants for both Operations and Administration holds the three-star rank of Vice Admiral, while the Chief of Coast Guard Staff holds the two-star rank of Rear Admiral.

==== List of Commandants ====
The list shows the following officeholders who served as the commandant of the Philippine Coast Guard since its foundation in 1967.

No.	Portrait	Commandant of the Philippine Coast Guard	Took office	Left office	Time in office	President	Ref.
1	Geronimo M. Cabal, AFP	Commodore; Geronimo M. Cabal, AFP	October 10, 1967	November 30, 1968	1 year, 51 days	Ferdinand Marcos	
2	Dioscoro E. Papa, AFP	Commodore; Dioscoro E. Papa, AFP	November 30, 1968	March 31, 1970	1 year, 121 days	Ferdinand Marcos	
3	Leovigildo L. Gantioqui, AFP	Commodore; Leovigildo L. Gantioqui, AFP	March 31, 1970	July 14, 1971	1 year, 105 days	Ferdinand Marcos	
4	Gil S. Fernandez, PN (MNSA)	Commodore; Gil S. Fernandez, PN (MNSA)	July 14, 1971	September 20, 1972	1 year, 68 days	Ferdinand Marcos	
5	Ernesto R. Ogbinar, AFP	Commodore; Ernesto R. Ogbinar, AFP	September 20, 1972	March 27, 1976	3 years, 189 days	Ferdinand Marcos	
6	Simeon M. Alejandro, AFP	Commodore; Simeon M. Alejandro, AFP	March 27, 1976	August 1, 1980	4 years, 127 days	Ferdinand Marcos	
7	Brillante C. Ochoco, AFP	Commodore; Brillante C. Ochoco, AFP	August 1, 1980	December 9, 1985	5 years, 130 days	Ferdinand Marcos	
8	Libertad L. Lazo, AFP	Commodore; Libertad L. Lazo, AFP	December 9, 1985	February 26, 1986	79 days	Ferdinand Marcos; Corazon Aquino	
9	Carlito Y. Cunanan, AFP	Commodore; Carlito Y. Cunanan, AFP	February 26, 1986	March 29, 1988	2 years, 32 days	Corazon Aquino	
10	Pio H. Garrido, AFP	Commodore; Pio H. Garrido, AFP	March 29, 1988	April 10, 1990	2 years, 32 days	Corazon Aquino	
*	Rodolfo J. Simon, PN (MNSA)	Captain; Rodolfo J. Simon, PN (MNSA)	April 10, 1990	April 17, 1990	7 days	Corazon Aquino	
11	Carlos L. Agustin, AFP	Commodore; Carlos L. Agustin, AFP	April 17, 1990	December 2, 1993	3 years, 229 days	Corazon Aquino; Fidel Ramos	
12	Dario T. Fajardo, AFP	Rear admiral Dario T. Fajardo, AFP	December 2, 1993	October 17, 1994	319 days	Fidel Ramos	
13	Arturo Y. Capada, AFP	Rear admiral Arturo Y. Capada, AFP	October 17, 1994	September 8, 1997	2 years, 326 days	Fidel Ramos	
*	Julito M. Casillan II, PN (GSC)	Captain; Julito M. Casillan II, PN (GSC)	September 8, 1997	October 10, 1997	32 days	Fidel Ramos	
14	Manuel I. De Leon, AFP	Rear admiral Manuel I. De Leon, AFP	October 10, 1997	June 1, 1998	266 days	Fidel Ramos	
15	Euceo E. Fajardo, PCG	Vice admiral Euceo E. Fajardo, PCG	June 1, 1998	February 9, 2001	2 years, 253 days	Fidel Ramos; Joseph Estrada; Gloria Macapagal Arroyo	
16	Reuben S. Lista, PCG	Vice admiral Reuben S. Lista, PCG	February 9, 2001	November 4, 2003	2 years, 268 days	Gloria Macapagal Arroyo	
17	Arthur N. Gosingan, PCG	Vice admiral Arthur N. Gosingan, PCG	November 4, 2003	November 9, 2006	3 years, 5 days	Gloria Macapagal Arroyo	
18	Damian L. Carlos, PCG	Admiral; Damian L. Carlos, PCG	November 9, 2006	September 27, 2007	322 days	Gloria Macapagal Arroyo	
19	Danilo A. Abinoja, PCG	Admiral; Danilo A. Abinoja, PCG	September 27, 2007	May 31, 2008	247 days	Gloria Macapagal Arroyo	
20	Wilfredo D. Tamayo, PCG	Admiral; Wilfredo D. Tamayo, PCG	May 31, 2008	April 19, 2011	2 years, 323 days	Gloria Macapagal Arroyo; Benigno Aquino III	
21	Ramon C. Liwag, PCG	Vice admiral Ramon C. Liwag, PCG	April 19, 2011	January 24, 2012	280 days	Benigno Aquino III	
22	Edmund C. Tan, PCG	Vice admiral Edmund C. Tan, PCG	January 24, 2012	December 14, 2012	325 days	Benigno Aquino III	
*	Luis M. Tuason Jr., PCG	Rear admiral Luis M. Tuason Jr., PCG	July 16, 2012	December 14, 2012	151 days	Benigno Aquino III	
23	Rodolfo D. Isorena, PCG	Admiral; Rodolfo D. Isorena, PCG	December 14, 2012	October 26, 2015	2 years, 316 days	Benigno Aquino III	
24	William M. Melad, PCG	Rear admiral William M. Melad, PCG	October 26, 2015	December 20, 2016	1 year, 55 days	Benigno Aquino III; Rodrigo Duterte	
OIC	Joel S. Garcia, PCG, Ph.D., HD, Al-Haj	Commodore; Joel S. Garcia, PCG, Ph.D., HD, Al-Haj	December 20, 2016	January 15, 2018	1 year, 26 days	Rodrigo Duterte	
25	Elson E. Hermogino, PCG	Admiral; Elson E. Hermogino, PCG	January 15, 2018	October 24, 2019	1 year, 282 days	Rodrigo Duterte	
26	Joel S. Garcia, PCG, Ph.D., HD, Al-Haj	Admiral; Joel S. Garcia, PCG, Ph.D., HD, Al-Haj	October 24, 2019	June 1, 2020	221 days	Rodrigo Duterte	
27	George V. Ursabia Jr.	Coast Guard Admiral; George V. Ursabia Jr.	June 1, 2020	September 8, 2021	1 year, 99 days	Rodrigo Duterte	
28	Leopoldo V. Laroya	Coast Guard Admiral; Leopoldo V. Laroya	September 8, 2021	February 10, 2022	155 days	Rodrigo Duterte	
OIC	Eduardo D. Fabricante	Coast Guard Vice Admiral; Eduardo D. Fabricante	February 10, 2022	February 28, 2022	18 days	Rodrigo Duterte	
29	Artemio M. Abu	Coast Guard Admiral; Artemio M. Abu	March 1, 2022	October 19, 2023	1 year, 242 days	Rodrigo Duterte; Bongbong Marcos	
30	Ronnie Gil L. Gavan, PCG	Admiral; Ronnie Gil L. Gavan, PCG	October 20, 2023	October 19, 2026	2 years, 364 days	Bongbong Marcos	
31	Rommel A. Supangan, PCG	Admiral; Rommel A. Supangan, PCG	October 19, 2026	Present	26 days	Bongbong Marcos	

=== Ranks ===
The Philippine Coast Guard ranks are:

Commissioned Officer

Rank group	General / flag officers				Senior officers			Junior officers
Philippine Coast Guard
Philippine Coast Guard	Admiral	Vice admiral	Rear admiral	Commodore	Captain	Commander	Lieutenant commander	Lieutenant	Lieutenant (junior grade)	Ensign

Non Commissioned Officer/Enlisted

Rank group	Senior NCOs						Junior NCOs	Enlisted
Philippine Coast Guard
Philippine Coast Guard	Master chief petty officer	Senior chief petty officer	Chief petty officer	Petty officer, first class	Petty officer, second class	Petty officer, third class	Seaman first class	Seaman second class	Seaman apprentice

=== National Headquarters Command Group ===
- Office of the Commandant
- Office of the Deputy Commandant for Administration
- Office of the Deputy Commandant for Operations
- Chief of Coast Guard Staff
  - Secretary of Coast Guard Staff

=== Coast Guard Central Directorial Staff ===
- Deputy Chief of Coast Guard Staff for Human Resource Management, CG-1
- Deputy Chief of Coast Guard Staff for Intelligence, CG-2
- Deputy Chief of Coast Guard Staff for Operations, CG-3
- Deputy Chief of Coast Guard Staff for Logistics, CG-4
- Deputy Chief of Coast Guard Staff for International Affairs, CG-5
- Deputy Chief of Coast Guard Staff for Comptrollership, CG-6
- Deputy Chief of Coast Guard Staff for Civil Relations Service, CG-7
- Deputy Chief of Coast Guard Staff for Maritime Safety Services, CG-8
- Deputy Chief of Coast Guard Staff for Marine Environment Protection, CG-9
- Deputy Chief of Coast Guard Staff for Ships and Aircraft Engineering, CG-10
- Deputy Chief of Coast Guard Staff for Maritime Communications, Weapons, Electronics and Information System, CG-11
- Deputy Chief of Coast Guard Staff for Education and Training, CG-12
- Deputy Chief of Coast Guard Staff for Maritime Security Services, CG-14
- Deputy Chief of Coast Guard Staff for Strategic Studies and Modernization, CG-15

=== Support Services ===
- Legal Service
- Legislative Liaison Affairs
- Medical Service
- Nursing Service
- Dental Service
- Chaplain Service
- Command Center
- Public Affairs Office
- Headquarters Support Group
- Office of the Command Master Chief Petty Officer
- Project Management Office
- Real Estate Management Office
- Special Service Office
- Adjutant Office
- Receiving Station
- Gender and Development

=== Functional Commands ===
- Maritime Safety Services Command
- Marine Environmental Protection Command
- Marine Security and Law Enforcement Command
- Coast Guard Fleet
- Coast Guard Education, Training and Doctrine Command
- K9 Force
- Security and Border Protection Service
- Sea Marshall Group
- Investigation and Detection Management Service
- Surface Patrol Force
- PCG SAICT

=== Coast Guard Districts ===
The Coast Guard Districts are responsible for broad, region-wide maritime operations in various regions across the country. Each of the respective Coast Guard Districts are also tasked in launching maritime safety operations, humanitarian assistance, law enforcement and environment security within their respective area of operations, including Coast Guard Stations for local, province-wide operations, and Coast Guard Sub-stations for smaller community-wide missions.

- Coast Guard District Northeastern Luzon
- Coast Guard District Northwestern Luzon
- Coast Guard District National Capital Region – Central Luzon
- Coast Guard District Southern Tagalog
- Coast Guard District Palawan
- Coast Guard District Kalayaan Island Group
- Coast Guard District Bicol
- Coast Guard District Eastern Visayas
- Coast Guard District Western Visayas
- Coast Guard District Central Visayas
- Coast Guard District Southern Visayas
- Coast Guard District Northern Mindanao
- Coast Guard District Northeastern Mindanao
- Coast Guard District Southeastern Mindanao
- Coast Guard District Southwestern Mindanao
- Coast Guard District Southern Mindanao
- Coast Guard District Bangsamoro Autonomous Region in Muslim Mindanao

== Units ==
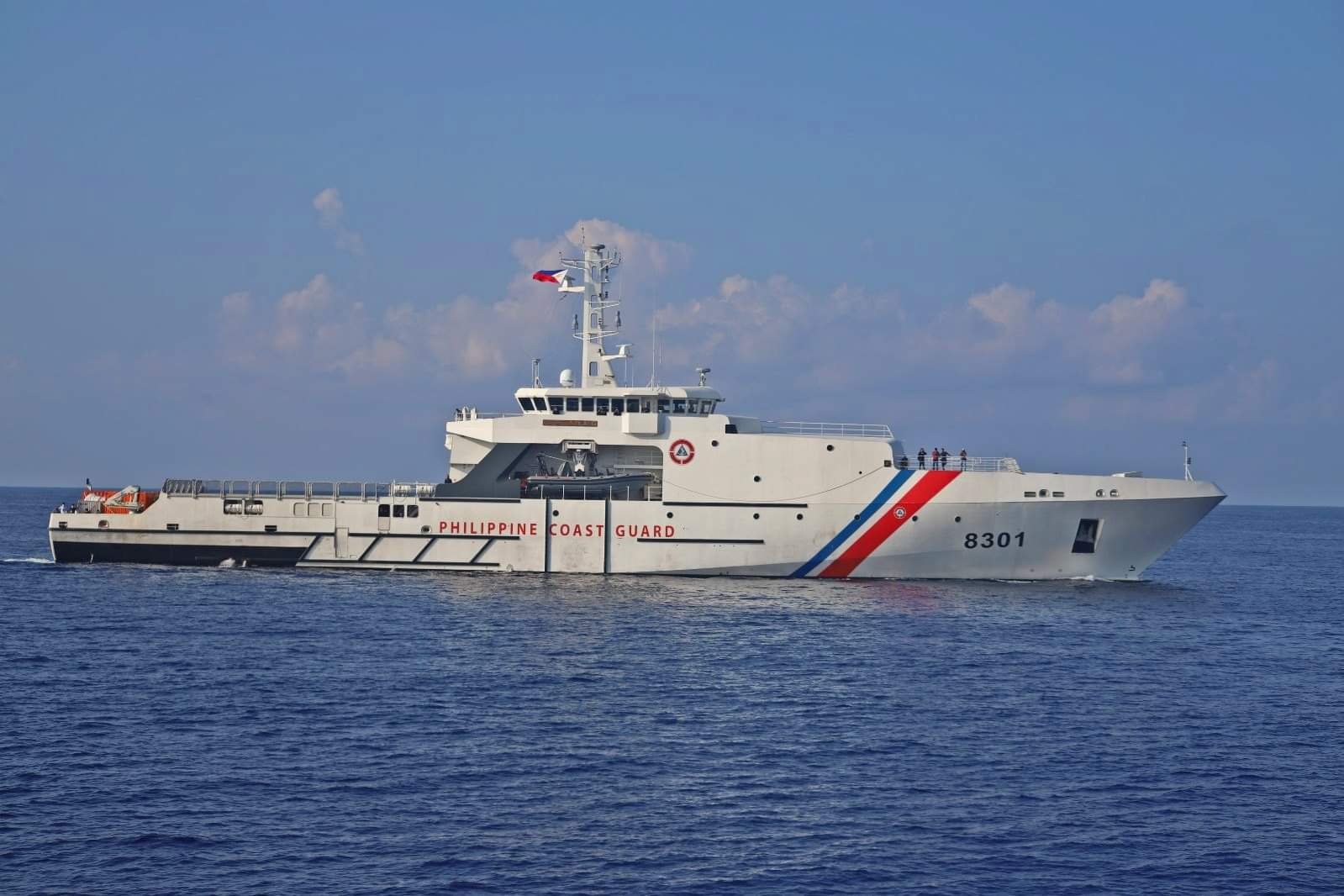
Philippine Coast Guard BRP Gabriela Silang (OPV-3801)

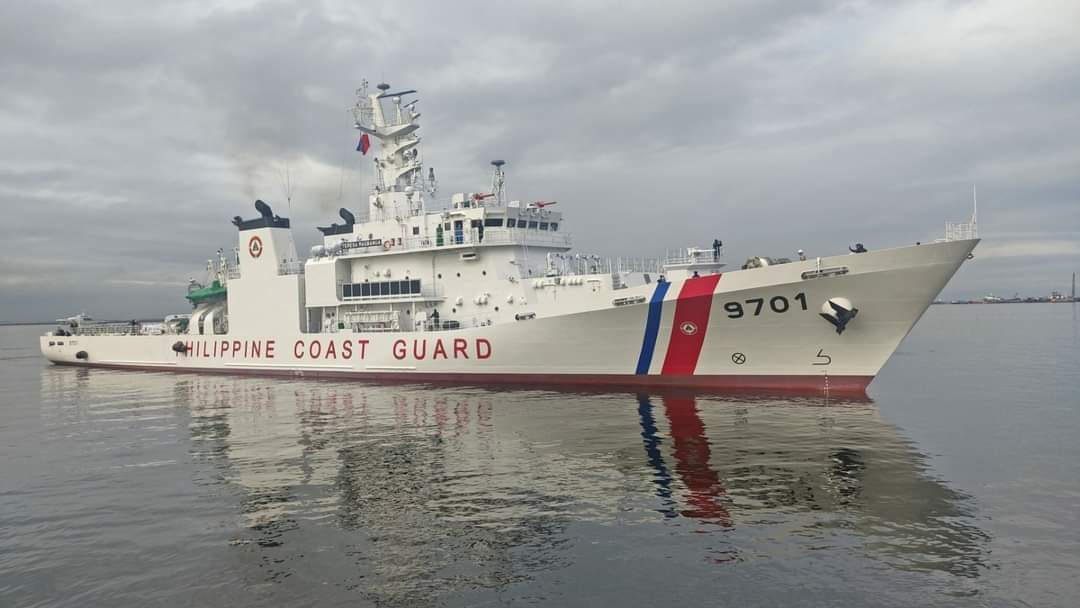
Philippine Coast Guard welcomes the arrival of BRP Teresa Magbanua (MRRV-9701) at the Port Area, Manila

The Philippine Coast Guard's functional command units include:

- The Maritime Security Command (MARSECOM) – responsible for overall territorial patrol, surveillance and law enforcement operations of the PCG.
- Marine Environmental Protection Command (MEPCOM) – responsible for overall maritime environmental enforcement, protection and control through maritime monitoring and enforcing maritime regulation operations.
- Maritime Safety Services Command (MSSC) – responsible for overall maritime surveillance for the safety of ships, navigational surveillance and ensures maritime freedom of navigation.

The PCG used to be with the Armed Forces of the Philippines under the Philippine Navy before it was transferred to the Department of Transportation. The PCG is considered the fourth armed and uniformed service of the country primarily tasked with enforcing all applicable laws within the Philippine waters, conducting maritime security operations, safeguarding of life and property at sea and protecting the marine environment and resources.

Due to the 2004 SuperFerry 14 bombing incident in 2004, the PCG activated the Task Force Sea Marshals a composite team from the PCG, AFP and Philippine National Police. These Sea Marshals ride on board the passenger ferries traveling to and from Manila and other ports, and maintain a security presence aboard these ferries.

=== Coast Guard Fleet ===
The Coast Guard Fleet is one of the Coast Guard's main support commands that is responsible for overall fleet management of all Coast Guard ships and related maritime operational assets for maritime patrols, safety, & law enforcement, as well as search and rescue (SAR), environmental protection, and interagency support. The command is also responsible for providing and operating coast guard ships to assist in carrying out its main duties and responsibilities at sea.

The Coast Guard Fleet is also structured into specialized operational forces aimed to further implement its core objectives:

- Offshore Surface Force : manages and operates large patrol vessels operating within the country's exclusive economic zone (EEZ) and high-sea, ocean-going missions.
- Coastal Surface Force : manages and operates medium-endurance ships for various missions such as maritime law enforcement, fisheries protection, pollution response, and coastal search and rescue (SAR) operations.
- Inshore Surface Force : operates inland and coastal patrol boats, primarily tasked for localized patrols, environmental monitoring, and community-based security and search and rescue missions.
- Auxiliary Surface Support Force : manages logistical support, vessel services, and specialized support missions for the fleet's missions
- Fleet Maintenance, Repair, and Logistics Services : handles and oversees nationwide dry docks, shipyards, technical support teams, and ship sustainment units to keep the vessels operational and mission-ready.

=== Coast Guard Aviation Command ===
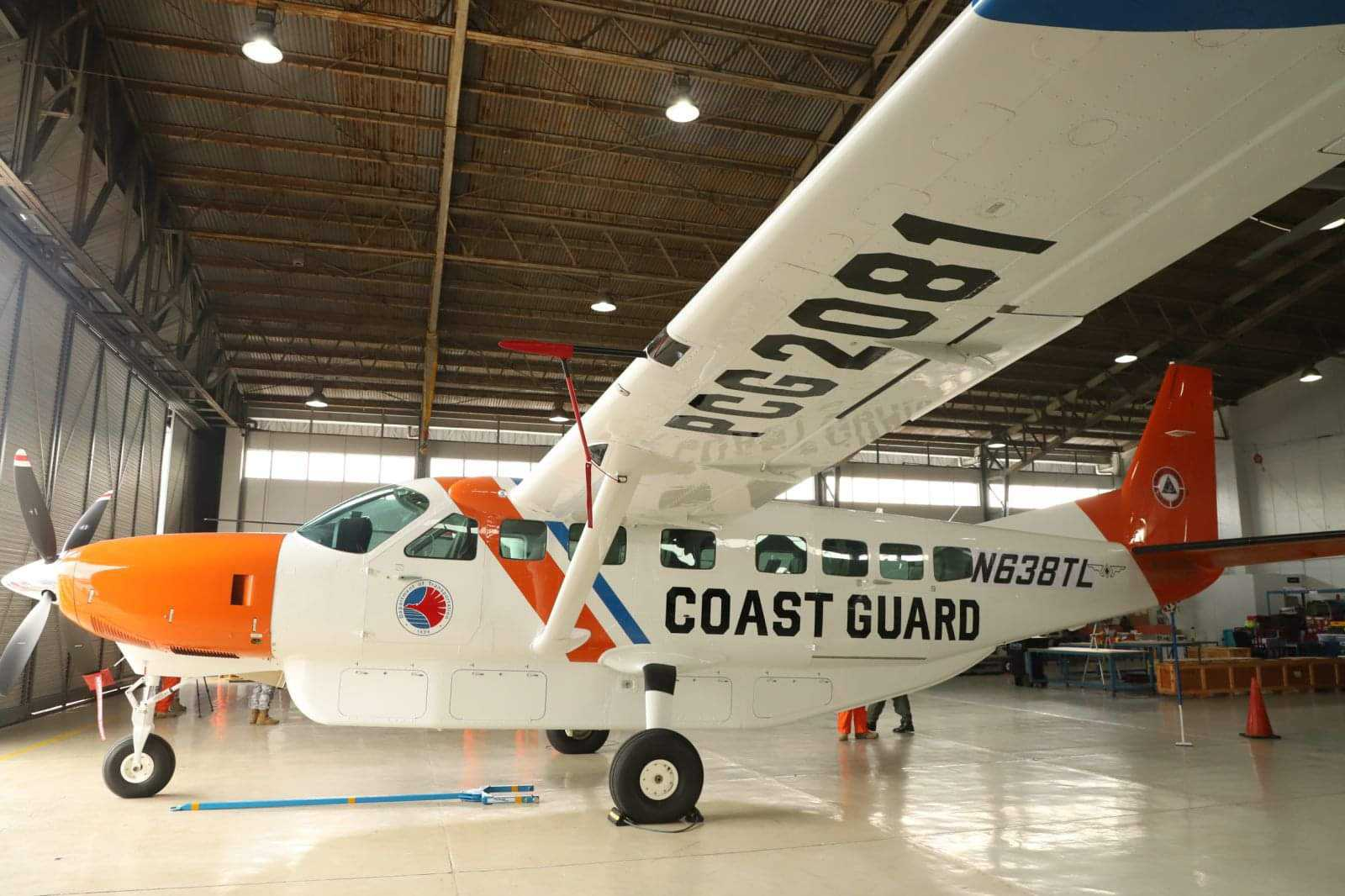
Cessna Grand Caravan EX of the Philippine Coast Guard

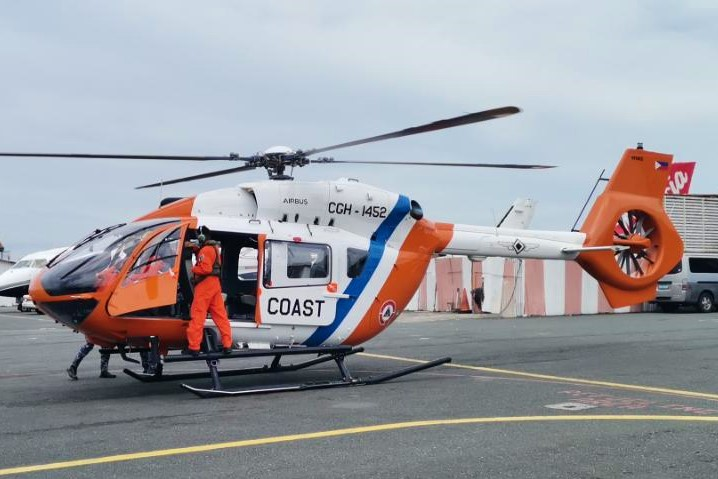
Philippine Coast Guard's Airbus H145 helicopter

The Coast Guard Aviation Force (CGAF), then known as Coast Guard Air Group was formally activated on May 18, 1998, during the incumbency of Commodore Manuel I de Leon PCG as Commandant, Philippine Coast Guard. Accordingly, Commander Noel O Monte PCG was designated as its first Commander holding office at the former PADC Hangar Nr. 3, Domestic Airport Complex, Pasay.

On January 22, 1999, after eight months of existence, PCGAG acquired its first aircraft, a BN Islander from the Philippine National Oil Company – Energy Development Corporation (PNOC – EDC). After six months of intensive inspection and rehabilitation, it was commissioned into Coast Guard service on June 26, 1999, as PCG–251. In June 1999, the first helicopter, a MBB BO-105CB was acquired from PADC and commissioned with the tail number PCG–1636. Another aircraft, a Cessna 421B "Golden Eagle" was acquired without cost from the Bureau of Soils and Water Management sometime in the early part of 2000. However, due to budgetary constraints, the aircraft rehabilitation is not yet completed to date. In the same year, another BN Islander with the tail number PCG–684 was acquired. It was commissioned and activated in June 2002 after it underwent rehabilitation. On March 30, 2001, the helm of the CGAG was transferred to Captain Lino H Dabi PCG. In search of a bigger home for its growing inventory, on November 21, 2002, with the support of Pantaleon Alvarez, the Secretary of Transportation and Communications, the Manila International Airport Authority allowed CGAG to occupy its present location. Extensive renovation work was undertaken to make the hangar suitable as the nerve center of all Coast Guard Air Operations. On March 28, 2003, the CGAG acquired another BO – 105C helicopter from PADC and was commissioned into the service as PCG – 163 during the Group's 5th Founding Anniversary.

With the need to extract survivors from water, a helicopter was fitted with a rescue hoist through the courtesy of the Japan International Cooperation Agency. Another milestone unfolded in the history of the group when PCG leadership was turned over to Vice Admiral Arthur Gosingan PCG. Through the endorsement of the CGOF Commander, Rear Admiral Damian Carlos PCG approvies the group's position paper on the Command Pilot Rating. This enabled aviators to have an equal opportunity with officers that acquired a Command at a Sea Badge to assume positions of higher responsibilities in the Coast Guard hierarchy.

=== Coast Guard Special Operations Force ===
The Philippine Coast Guard's Special Operations Force (CGSOF) is the special forces unit of the Philippine Coast Guard, founded in 1972. The CGSOF performs underwater operations, domestic counter-terrorism and other law enforcement operations. Some of their notable deployments and accomplishments include the operations to the Laoag International Airlines Flight 585 crash at Manila Bay, the aftermath of the 2004 SuperFerry 14 bombing, the Search and Recovery operations to the ill-fated M/V Princess of the Stars incident, and the Battle of Marawi.

=== Philippine Coast Guard Auxiliary ===
The Philippine Coast Guard Auxiliary (PCGA) is the civilian support group of the Philippine Coast Guard. Although a volunteer, civilian organization, the PCGA uses a military structure for organizational purposes. Like other volunteer sea rescue organizations around the world, it performs non-military and non-police activities in support of its national navy or coast guard. This endeavor includes search and rescue, environmental protection, disaster relief, community service, and marine safety.

The ranks of the Philippine Coast Guard Auxiliary follow those of the Philippine Coast Guard.

Operation Brotherhood Montessori Center has a few officers that serve as Leadership Training teachers and CAT teachers from this Coast Guard branch.

=== Philippine Coast Guard Officers' Basic Education and Training Center ===
Like the Training and Doctrine Command (TRADOC)'s Officer Candidate Schools (OCS) of Philippine Army, Philippine Navy and Philippine Air Force, the Philippine Coast Guard also has Philippine Coast Guard Officers' Basic Education and Training Center (PCGOBETC) that serves as officer candidate school of PCG officer aspirants. Officer Candidates taking the Coast Guard Officers' Course (CGOC) become Probationary Ensigns (P/ENS) and after graduation, they will be commissioned as regular officers in the organization.

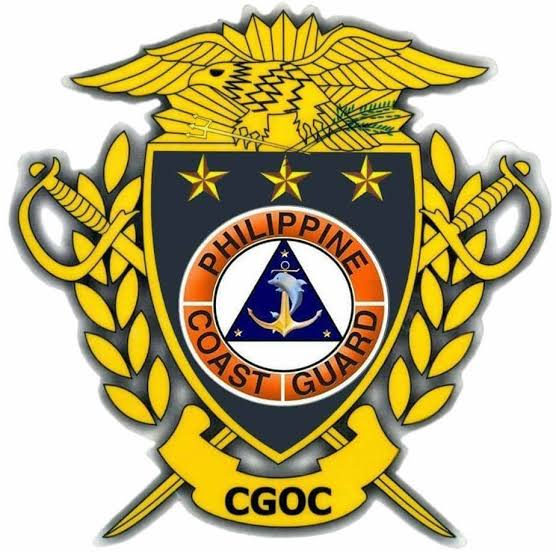
Official logo of PCGOBETC

== Ships in service ==
=== Major maritime assets ===
Picture	Class	Origin	Type	Vessels	Notes
Patrol vessels
	Teresa Magbanua-class	Japan	Multi-role response vessel	BRP Teresa Magbanua; BRP Melchora Aquino; MRRV-9703 – TBC; MRRV-9704 – TBC; MRRV-9705 – TBC; MRRV-9706 – TBC; MRRV-9707 – TBC	Two 97-meter vessels built by Mitsubishi Shipbuilding, with five additional vessels on order.
	Gabriela Silang-class	France	Offshore patrol vessel	BRP Gabriela Silang	One 83-meter OPV equipped with helipad built by OCEA of France.
	''Kinmen''-class	Republic of China	Search and rescue vessel	BRP Sarangani	61-meter-long former Taiwan Coast Guard Authority vessel, the Kinmen (CG123), donated to the an NGO, the WPS Foundation, which in turn donated to the PCG.
	San Juan-class	Australia	Search and rescue vessel	BRP San Juan; BRP EDSA II; BRP Pampanga; BRP Batangas	Four 56-meter vessels equipped with helipad and built by Tenix. Currently non-operational and reported to have fallen into disrepair. Australia commissioned a feasibility study in 2024 to assess returning vessels to operational service.
	Parola-class	Japan	Multi-role response vessel	BRP Tubbataha; BRP Malabrigo; BRP Malapascua; BRP Capones; BRP Suluan; BRP Sindangan; BRP Cape San Agustin; BRP Cabra; BRP Bagacay; BRP Cape Engaño	Ten 44-meter vessels built by Japan Marine United.
	Datu Bago-class	Philippines	Offshore patrol vessel	BRP Datu Bago	A 40-meter vessel built by Josefa Slipways Inc., and was transferred to the PCG from the Bureau of Fisheries and Aquatic Resources on 2024.
	Ilocos Norte-class	Australia	Search and rescue vessel	BRP Ilocos Norte; BRP Nueva Vizcaya; BRP Romblon; BRP Davao del Norte	Four 35-meter vessels built by Tenix. Currently non-operational and reported to have fallen into disrepair. Australia commissioned a feasibility study in 2024 to assess returning vessels to operational service.
Patrol boats / Patrol crafts
	FPB 110 PCG class	France	Fast patrol boat	0 (+40 units on order)	Forty 35-meter patrol boats to be built by OCEA of France. 40 units in order as of 2025.
	Boracay-class	France	Fast patrol boat	BRP Boracay; BRP Kalanggaman; BRP Panglao; BRP Malamawi	Four 24-meter patrol boats built by OCEA of France.
	Marine Protector-class	United States	Patrol Boat	BRP Pag-Asa; BRP Patag	Two vessels with hull numbers 2701 and 2702 (in Philippine service) were transferred by the U.S. to the Philippines in 2026.
Support vessels
	E-craft	United States	Transport / Hospital ship	BRP Amelia Gordon	The Philippine Red Cross handed over its multipurpose ship M/V Amazing Grace to the Philippine Coast Guard during an official turnover held on January 30, 2025.
	Corregidor-class	Japan	Buoy tender	BRP Corregidor (AE-891)	Built by Niigata Engineering in Japan through a soft loan. Commissioned on February 3, 1998, and is currently in active service.
	Balsam-class	United States	Buoy tender	BRP Kalinga (AE-89)	Ex-USCG Balsam-class navigational aid tender, USCGC Redbud (WLB-398) built by Marine Iron and SB Corp. Refitted in Cavite Naval Yard in November 1995. Equipped with a helicopter platform and an ice-breaking bow.
	Habagat-class	Japan	Medium-size ocean tugboat	BRP Habagat (TB-271)	

=== Minor maritime assets ===
Picture	Origin	Type	In Service	Notes
	Philippines	12–15-meter Seacraft High Speed Response Boat	40 (+14)	40 Seacraft High Speed Response Boat ordered from Dynacast Shipbuilding – Dynamic Power Joint Venture. The first 3 units were delivered in October 2023. All boats delivered by 2024. 14 more boats being acquired through public tender as of August 2026.
	Japan	15-meter Patrol Speed Boat	1	1 Patrol Speed Boat provided by Japan.
	Japan	12-meter High Speed Interceptor Craft	2	2 Yamaha High Speed Boat 1202 provided by Japan, to be used by Special Operations Group.
	United States	10-meter Response Boat – Small	4	Acquired via US FMS Program. Additional units scheduled for delivery.
	Philippines	Aluminum V-shaped hull boat	320	Used in search-and-rescue and disaster response. 300 ordered in an earlier contract, another 20 units delivered by Pacificfortia Marine Technologies in October 2018.
	From multiple suppliers	Rigid-hulled inflatable boat	93	Used in search-and-rescue and disaster response. 81 units ordered earlier, another 12 units made by Trenton USA delivered in October 2018.
	From multiple suppliers	Rubber boat	50	Used in search-and-rescue and disaster response.

=== Unmanned maritime vessels ===
Picture	Model	Origin	Type	In Service	Notes
	Shanaka 93 Class USV	United Nations	Unmanned surface vehicle	1	Uncrewed Surface Vessel (Unmanned Surface Vessel) is equipped with multiple surveillance sensors to collect MDA information. The USV has self-righting capability and can remain loitering out at sea or navigate on a predetermined plotted course.
	Oceanbotics SRV-8 ROV	Australia	Remotely operated underwater vehicle	1	Donated by the Australian Government as part of a maritime capability package for the Philippine Coast Guard. Equipped with Blueprint Subsea Oculus M-Series imaging sonar system to support underwater inspection, search-and-recovery, and maritime domain awareness operations.

== Aircraft in service ==
Picture	Model	Origin	Type	Variant	In Service	Notes
Fixed-wing aircraft
	BN-2 Islander	United Kingdom	Search and Rescue	BN-2A	5	Tail number: PCG–684, PCG-251, PCG-2169, PCG-4177 and PCG-829.
	Cessna 208 Caravan	United States	Search and Rescue	208EX	1	Plans were also laid out to procure 3 additional units. Tail number: PCG–2081.
	Piper PA-31 Navajo	United States	Search and Rescue	PA-31	2	Tail number: PCG-221, PCG-302.
	Beechcraft Super King Air	United States	Search and Rescue	360ER	0 (+3 on order)	Philippine Coast Guard Commandant Admiral Ronnie Gil Gavan and US Assistant Secretary of War for Indo-Pacific Security Affairs John Noh signed a Letter of Offer and Acceptance for the acquisition of three Beechcraft King Air light twin-engined turboprop aircraft in Manila February 16, 2026.
Helicopters
	Airbus H145	Germany	Search and Rescue	H145	2	5 additional units planned to be acquired, under a 5-bladed variant, set to complete the Maritime Disaster Response Helicopter Acquisition Project of the Philippine Coast Guard which requires 7 multirole helicopters.
	AgustaWestland AW109	Italy	Search and Rescue	AW109E	(+2)	2 being transferred from the Philippine Air Force, with more units eyed. Weapon-capable being armed helicopters during PAF service.
Unmanned Aerial Vehicles
	Quantum-Systems Trinity	Germany	Aerial Mapping	Trinity F90+	6	Donated by the German Government in June 2022.
	AeroVironment RQ-20 Puma	United States	Miniature UAV	RQ-20A Puma AE	5	Received five AeroVironment RQ-20 Puma drones from the US.
	ORPHIR 6 eUAV	Philippines	Surveillance unmanned aerial vehicle		1	Gifted by UNODC Global Maritime Crime Programme (GMCP), the fixed-wing maritime unmanned aerial vehicle (UAV) has vertical-take-off-and-landing (VTOL) capability, six hours endurance, airbag flotation device for emergency water landing and 5 kg payload with multiple maritime sensors. Developed by Philippine company Dodeca Drones, using the AheadX QP537 eUAV design from China.
	DeltaQuad Evo	Netherlands	Long range UAS	Evo	1	Donated by Australia.
	Freespace Callisto 25	Australia	Heavy-lift multirotor UAV	Callisto 25	1	Donated by Australia as part of a maritime capability package for the Philippine Coast Guard. An Australian-manufactured heavy-lift drone designed for logistics, surveillance, and other operational support missions.
	Sypaq Corvo	Australia	Disposable autonomous drone	Corvo	6	An initial donation formed part of Australia's PHP34 million drone assistance package to the Philippine Coast Guard in 2025, with additional systems donated in 2026.
	Skydio X10	United States	Short range UAS	X10	15	Donated by Australia.

== Recent acquisitions ==
=== Disaster Response Equipment for Philippine Coast Guard Project ===
The Project ensures that each of the Philippine Coast Guard's 12 Coast Guard District Headquarters will be assigned two Rubber Boats each for Rescue missions. Furthermore, all 63 Coast Guard Stations and the 237 Coast Guard Detachments will have one Aluminum Boat. Also, all 63 Coast Guard Stations will be equipped with one Rigid Hull Inflatable Boat (RHIB). Other RHIBs and Rubber Boats will be assigned to PCG Special Units and Search and Rescue vessels.

All the 300 Aluminum Boats, 81 RHIBs and 50 Rubber Boats will be equipped with 2 units VHF handheld marine-type Radio, 2 units Operators' Life Vests, 6 units of Common Life Vests, 1 Megaphone and 4 units of Flares.

It is projected to minimize the instances when PCG personnel borrowing boats from fishermen, or other private entities to perform their duties during emergencies. This resulted in delays in the PCG's response time, making rescue operations less efficient.

Under this same project but under a different public bidding document, 15 units of M35 6×6 Trucks and 40 units rubber boats were purchased. 3 units of the trucks and all 40 rubber boat units are currently assigned with the National Headquarters of the PCG. The remaining 12 units of the M35 trucks are assigned to each of the 12 Coast Guard Districts. It is expected to further facilitate timely response to disaster situations.

=== Maritime Safety Capability Improvement Project (Phase I) ===
The Project aims to strengthen and further develop the coast watch/patrol and search and rescue capabilities of Philippine Coast Guard by procuring additional patrol vessels. This will support the PCG in fulfilling its mandate and in complying with the international commitments of the Philippines on maritime safety, security and environmental protection. The vessels are to be deployed in ten PCG Districts Manila, Tacloban, Zamboanga, Puerto Princesa, La Union, Iloilo, San Fernando (La Union), Davao, Legaspi and Cagayan de Oro.

This JICA Project supports PCG, who is responsible of Maritime Safety, to enhance its capabilities to quickly and appropriately respond to coastal maritime incidents, such as search and rescue, maritime law enforcement, etc., by providing Multi-Role Responsive Vessels (MRRVs), thereby increasing the vessel/maritime area rate of each of the 12 districts. The Project is also in line with development policy of the Philippines and assistance strategy of Japan. Therefore, it is relevant that JICA supports the implementation of the Project.

During Japan's Minister of Foreign Affairs visit to Philippines in January 2013, Minister Fumio Kishida underscored the role of Japan as the Philippines' strategic ally. In the conference, he stressed Japan would provide 10 patrol vessels to the Philippine Coast Guard on a loan basis. Shinzo Abe confirmed that 10 patrol boats will be swiftly donated to the Coast Guard. President Aquino and Prime Minister Abe witnessed the signing of a $187-million (18.732 billion yen) loan for the Philippines' acquisition of multi-role response vessels to boost the capability of its coast guard to conduct maritime patrols.

=== Maritime Safety Capability Improvement Project for the Philippine Coast Guard (Phase II) ===
The project involves the acquisition of two heavy weather, high endurance 94-meter Offshore Patrol Vessels (OPVs), to provide the PCG with vessels with a cruising range capability of 4,000 nautical miles, can be used in Sea-State 6 (wave height of up to 6 meters) in rough sea condition, and are capable to conduct continuous maritime patrol up to 15 days at 15 knots. Each vessel, as claimed by PCG, will enable them to recover as much as 500 passengers in the event of a maritime disaster, as well as provide the country with wider maritime coverage for strategic and national security purposes. Given these upgraded vessel capacities, the project now costs PhP8 billion and with the NEDA Board approval, are expected to be delivered by 2022.

=== Maritime Safety Capability Improvement Project for the Philippine Coast Guard (Phase III) ===
The NEDA Board approved Phase 3 of the Maritime Safety Capability Improvement Project for the Philippine Coast Guard. This project involves the design, construction, and delivery of five units of multi-role response vessels or MRRVs, each with a length of 97 meters. This project comes after the agency expressed its desire to gain such number of units in January 2023. It also includes a five-year integrated logistics support.

This will further improve the Philippine Coast Guard's capability to respond to threats and incidents within the country's maritime jurisdiction. In particular, the project will enable the Coast Guard to secure important sea lines of communication in the South China Sea, Sulu-Celebes Seas, and the Philippine Sea. It will also help the PCG combat illegal activities and enforce maritime laws in the Philippine waters.

The total project cost is PHP 29.3 billion, which will be financed through an Official Development Assistance or ODA loan from the Government of Japan.

=== Philippine Ports and Coast Guard Capability Development Project ===
The project aims to strengthen the Philippine Coast Guard's capability to promote safety of life, protect the marine environment and enforce maritime laws through procurement of four brand new 24-meter OCEA FPV 72MKII patrol boats, 20 fast patrol boats, and one 82-meter 270 MKII offshore patrol vessel.

The budget from this project came from the loan balance of a French loan that financed the cancelled Greater Maritime Access Ports Project of the Arroyo administration.

=== Maritime Disaster Response Helicopter Acquisition Project ===
The project involves the procurement of seven Maritime Disaster Response (MDR) helicopters for the Philippine Coast Guard to strengthen and expand their MDR capabilities during maritime incidents and natural disasters and calamities. The project will also involve the training of pilots and technical crew, procurement of mission equipment, procurement of maintenance tools and spare parts for five years, and the construction of hangars for the helicopters and offices for the pilots and technical crew. It was supposed to be funded by the Credit Agricole of Germany.

In addition to the recently acquired Airbus H145 helicopters, plans were also laid out to acquire 2 units of AgustaWestland AW139 for SAR operations.

=== Lightweight Multi-purpose Fixed Wing Aircraft Acquisition Project ===
The project involves the procurement of one fixed-wing aircraft in order to increase the Coast Guard's aerial responsibilities, such as maritime patrol, search and rescue (SAR), and utility operations. Due to a limited budget, the coast guard has planned to acquire 1 or 2 units of the Cessna 208B Grand Caravan EX, with plans laid out to acquire additional units in the coming years as the aircraft is expected to replace the ageing Britten-Norman BN-2 Islander.

== See also ==
- Armed Forces of the Philippines
- Philippine Army
- Philippine Air Force
- Philippine Navy
- Philippine Marine Corps
- Philippine National Police
