= Tsugaru-class patrol vessel =

Japanese Coast Guard Vessel

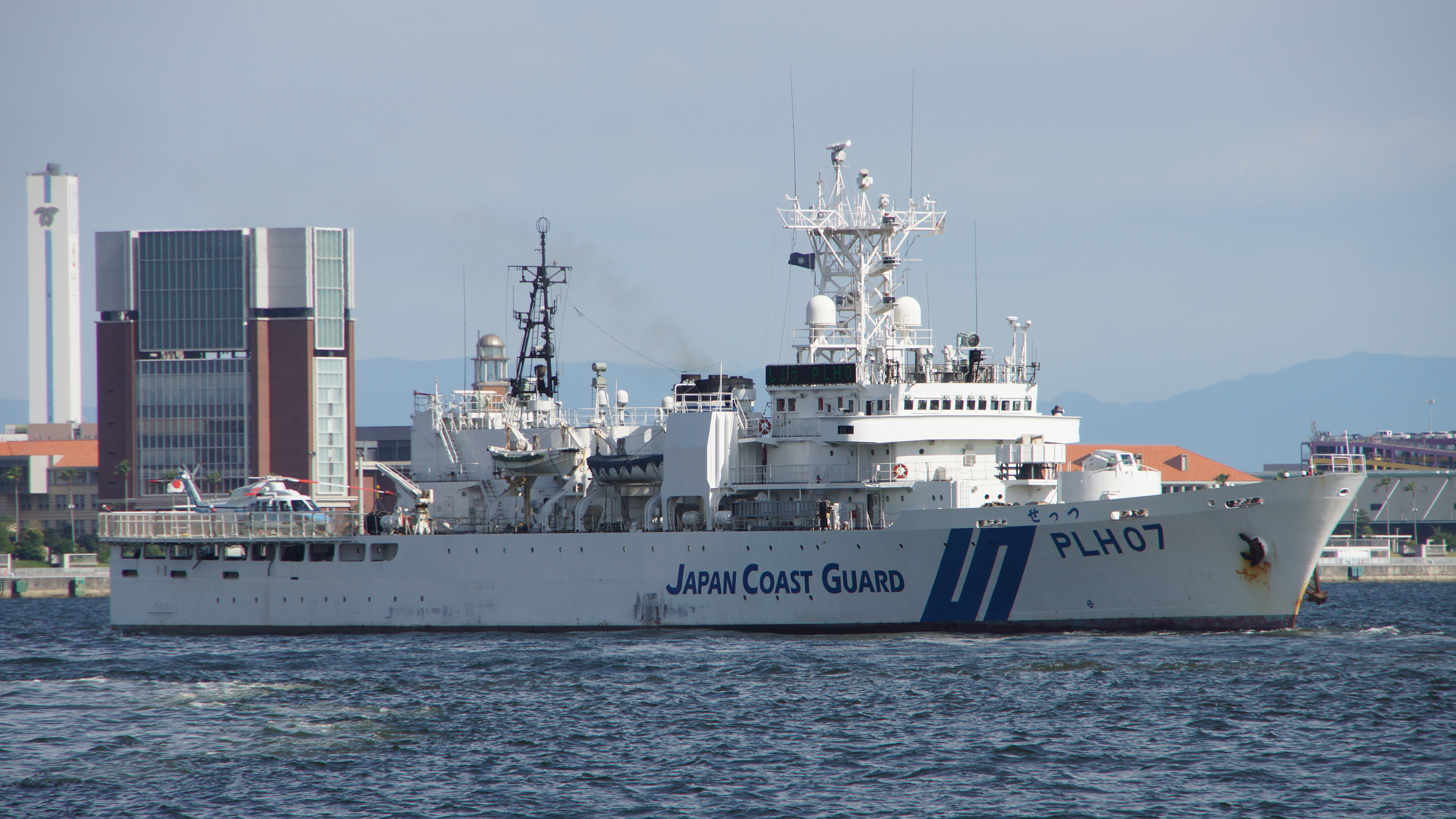
- Settsu (PLH-07)

Class overview
- Name: Tsugaru class
- Operators: Japan Coast Guard
- Preceded by: Sōya
- Built: 1978–2001
- In commission: 1979–present
- Completed: 9
- Active: 9

General characteristics of the Ryukyu class
- Type: PLH (Patrol vessel Large with Helicopter)
- Displacement: 4,037 tonnes full load
- Length: 105.4 m (345 ft 10 in)
- Beam: 14.6 m (47 ft 11 in)
- Draught: 8.0 m (26 ft 3 in)
- Propulsion: 2 × shafts; 2 × diesel engines
- Speed: 23 knots (43 km/h; 26 mph)
- Range: 6,000 nmi (11,000 km; 6,900 mi)
- Complement: 69
- Armament: 1 × L/90 35 mm gun; 1 × JM61-RFS 20 mm gun
- Aviation facilities: 1 × ASR helicopter

The Tsugaru-class patrol vessel (つがる型巡視船, Tsugaru-gata-junnshi-senn) is a class of PLH type patrol vessels of the Japan Coast Guard (JCG; former Maritime Safety Agency, MSA).

== Backgrounds ==
In late 1970s, it was clear that the new international rules on exclusive economic zone would need a considerable increase in the size of the Maritime Safety Agency fleets. In order to cover a wide ocean with a small number of vessels, JMSA began considering the shipping operation of air-sea rescue helicopters.

At first, Sōya was built as a prototype in the plan of FY1977. Then, from the supplementary budget for the same year, construction of this class was started.

== Design ==
This class is roughly based on its prototype, Sōya, it is the same as having a long forecastle, but her icebreaking capability was omitted. In order to operate helicopter with these small ships, antiroll tanks and fixed fin stabilizers were set up. Since this class were built for a long time, the design are slightly different. In particular, the overall improvement was added to the design of the last two vessels, so the United States Naval Institute dealt them as a separate group, Ryukyu class.

Like Sōya, these ships are not only a helicopter platform but also a command ship, so an operations room, OIC section, is installed adjacent to the bridge. The ability of Command and control is improved sequentially. Currently, Heli-TV system are installed to enable transmission of TV signals directly from a helicopter to OIC section. There are also SATCOM system to relay these TV signals to headquarters onshore.

In the earliest ships, one L/60 Bofors 40 mm gun and one L/70 Oerlikon 20 mm cannon were set up. But both of them became obsolete, so later, 40 mm guns were replaced by L/90 Oerlikon 35 mm guns, and 20 mm cannons were replaced by JM61-M 20 mm rotary cannons. And in the Ryukyu class, the 20 mm rotary cannons are upgraded to JM61-RFS, remotely operated version with an optical director.

In the early days, Bell 212 air-sea rescue helicopters were deployed as the shipboard helicopters. Then, with the aging of the Bell 212, they were superseded by the Sikorsky S-76C/D by 2016.

== In service ==
These ships are operated as command ships of each Regional Coast Guard Headquarters flotilla or task force, and conducting many search and rescue operations.

In the Incident of Suspicious Boats off the Coast of Noto Peninsula, Chikuzen acted as a forward operating base of the Special Security Team (SST). She also fired warning shots by her JM61-M.

With their high-endurance and aviation patrol capability, these ships also attend to overseas dispatch including counter-piracy operations in the Strait of Malacca.

18 January 2023 Echigo ran aground on, or struck a reef off Kashiwazaki, Niigata Prefecture, Honshu, in the Sea of Japan. later anchored.

== Ships in the class ==
| Pennant number | Ship name | Builder | Commission | Decommission | Homeport |
|---|---|---|---|---|---|
| PLH-02 | Tsugaru | IHI Corporation | 17 April 1979 | | Hakodate |
| PLH-03 | Sagami (former Ōsumi) | Tamano Shipyard, Mitsui Engineering & Shipbuilding | 18 October 1979 | | Kagoshima |
| PLH-04 | Uruma (former Uraga, Hayato) | Maizuru Shipyard, Hitachi Zosen Corporation | 5 March 1980 | | Naha |
| PLH-05 | Zaō | Nagasaki Shipyard, Mitsubishi Heavy Industries | 19 March 1983 | | Sendai |
| PLH-06 | Okinawa (former Chikuzen) | Kawasaki Shipbuilding Corporation | 28 September 1983 | | Naha |
| PLH-07 | Settsu | Uraga Shipyard, Sumitomo Heavy Industries | 27 September 1984 | | Kobe |
| PLH-08 | Echigo | Tamano Shipyard, Mitsui Engineering & Shipbuilding | 28 February 1990 | | Niigata |
| PLH-09 | Ryukyu | Nagasaki Shipyard, Mitsubishi Heavy Industries | 31 March 2000 | | Naha |
| PLH-10 | Daisen | Tsurumi Shipyard, JFE Engineering | 1 October 2001 | | Maizuru |
