= June 2024 Second Thomas Shoal incident =

China–Philippines incident near the Spratly Islands

- Part of South China Sea disputes
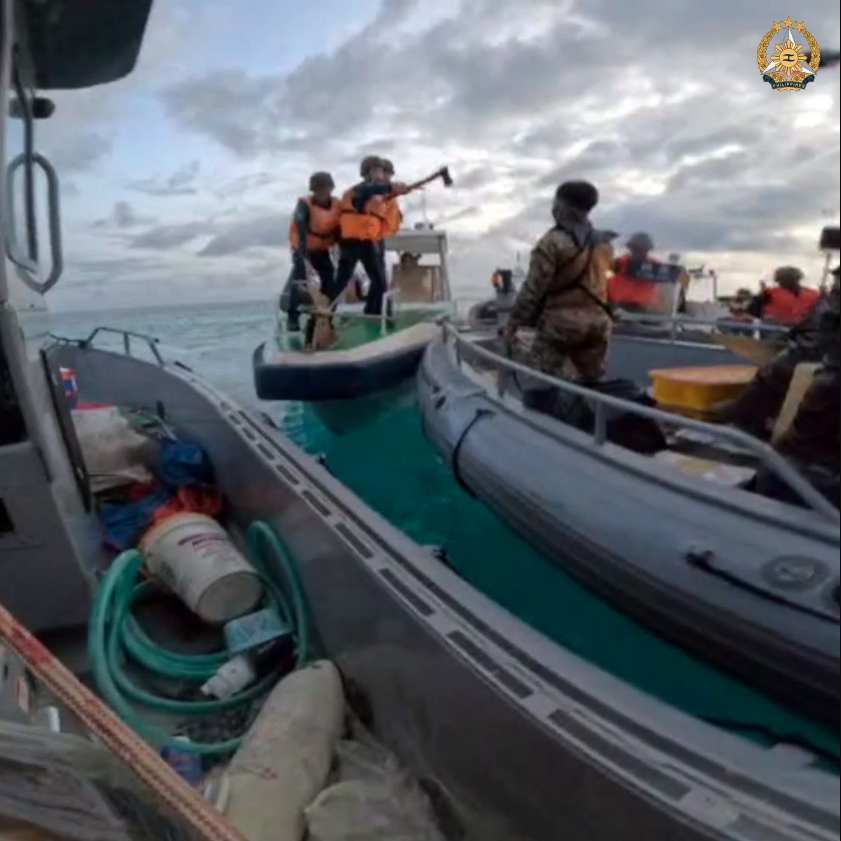
- China Coast Guard personnel (left) brandishing an axe towards a Filipino military personnel
Date	June 17, 2024; 05:59 UTC+8
Location	Second Thomas Shoal, South China Sea

Belligerents
Philippines	China

Units involved
Armed Forces of the Philippines: Philippine Navy; BRP Sierra Madre; ~2 rigid hull inflatable boats; Civilian ships; ML Lapulapu	China Coast Guard

Casualties and losses
8 injured (Note: Including one losing his right thumb)	None reported

On June 17, 2024, the China Coast Guard interfered with a resupply mission by the Philippine Navy near the Second Thomas Shoal, which is part of the internationally contested Spratly Islands.

== Background ==
The Second Thomas Shoal is a submerged reef and is among the maritime features which form part of the Spratly Islands, which is claimed as a territory by several nations including China and the Philippines.

The Philippines has deliberately grounded the BRP Sierra Madre in 1999 in an attempt to enforce its sovereignty claims, which remains a commissioned ship of the Philippine Navy over the feature which it believes to be within its exclusive economic zone. Meanwhile, China virtually claims sovereignty over most of the South China Sea.

On June 15, 2024, the China Coast Guard released new guidelines on implementing its 2021 law which authorizes its officers to use lethal means on foreign ships which enter waters China claims. The guidelines allow the detention of non-Chinese on the suspicion of "violating entry-exit laws of China" without formal charge for up to 60 days.

== Incident ==
=== Resupply mission ===
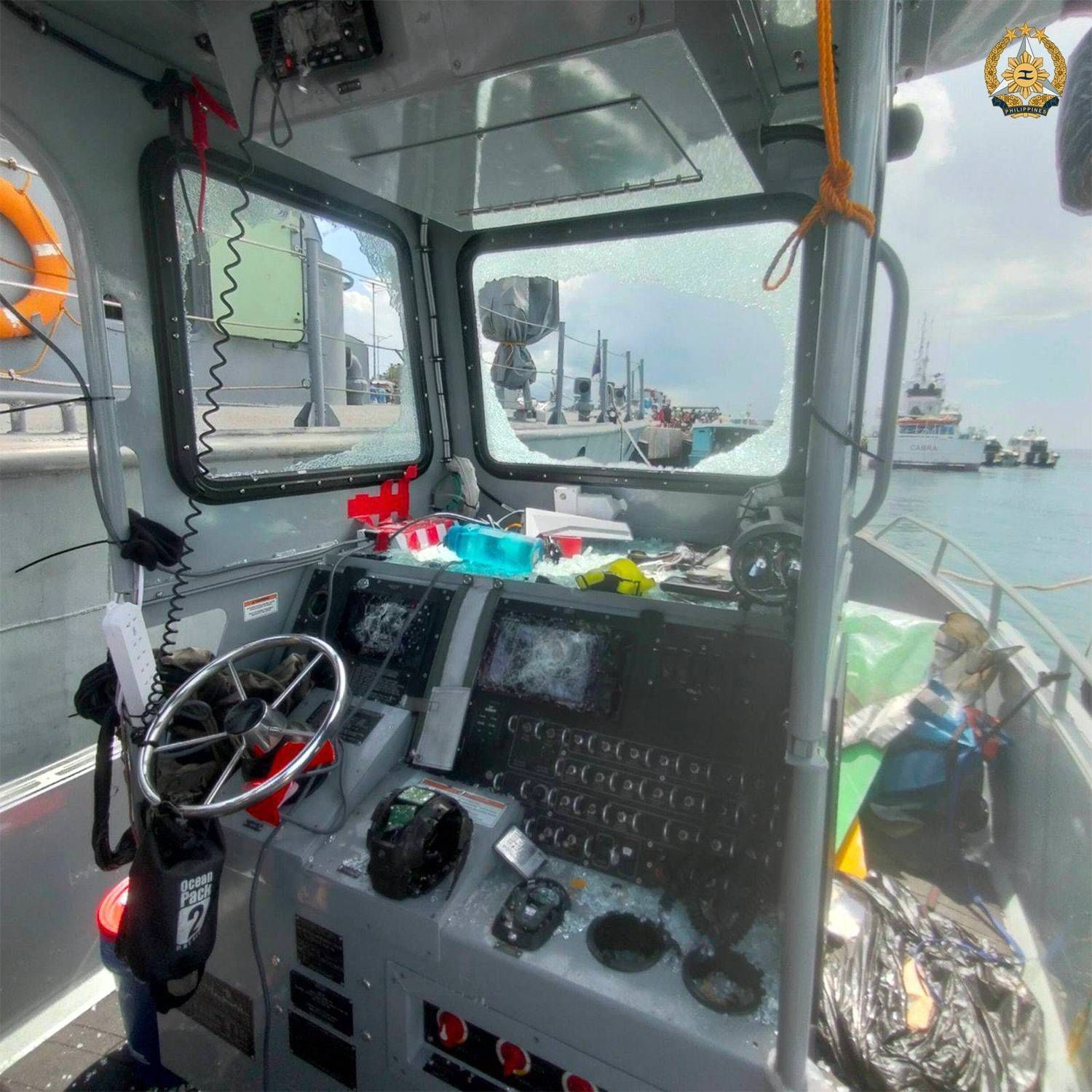
Damage on the interface on a ship operated by the Philippine Navy. Photograph was released by the Philippine military.

The Philippines, particularly the Armed Forces of the Philippines (AFP) backed by the Philippine Coast Guard under a "limited" role, was conducting a rotation and reprovisioning (RORE) mission for its personnel stationed at the Second Thomas Shoal on June 17, 2024.

The AFP used the civilian vessel ML Lapulapu and the Philippine Navy's rigid hull inflatable boats (RHIBs).

The China Coast Guard (CCG) would interfere with the Philippine mission. As per the CCG, it responded when a Philippine supply ship at around 5:59 am "dangerously approached and deliberately collided" with a "normally navigating" Chinese vessel. CCG insists that it has issued multiple "stern warnings" which was ignored.

The Philippines said that China Coast Guard personnel boarded its boats and allegedly damaged the communications and navigational equipment of the boats and took seven firearms. It also said that there is a directive for Filipino personnel on board not to display or use any firearms and therefore fought against Chinese coast guard personnel who are armed with bladed weapons with bare arms.

The ML Lapulapu was reportedly rammed and did not proceed with its intended mission.

China acknowledge that the action of its coast guard marks the first time it conducted an onboard inspection on Philippine vessels.

CCG personnel also reportedly threw rocks at Filipino troops moored near the grounded BRP Sierra Madre.

Eight Filipino personnel reportedly got injured. One of them was noted to have lost a finger.

The Philippine military has demanded the return of the rifles confiscated by China and reparation for the damaged equipment.

=== Rescue mission ===
The Philippine Coast Guard's BRP Bagacay would retrieve the stalled BRP Cabra at 8:00am but was shadowed by three Hubei Class missile boats by the People's Liberation Army Navy of China. Bagacay would be informed about the damaged RHIBs.

The PCG was notified about the injured Filipino troops at around 10:00 am which were allowed to be brought to the grounded Sierra Madre. The PCG was able to retrieve their damaged RHIBs by 12 noon.

The Philippines attempted to rescue the injured personnel by 10:30 pm. China allowed the Philippines to retrieve the eight injured but insisted that the responding vessels not bring construction materials.

== Reaction ==
=== China ===
The Ministry of Foreign Affairs of China insist that the resupply mission of by the Philippines is illegal and that they are actually sending construction materials and weapons to the BRP Sierra Madre contrary to the Philippine claim. It maintained that the action of the China Coast Guard was "professional and restrained" and that the Philippines has provoked China. The China Coast Guard also maintained the same stance in regards to the nature of its conduct.

=== Philippines ===
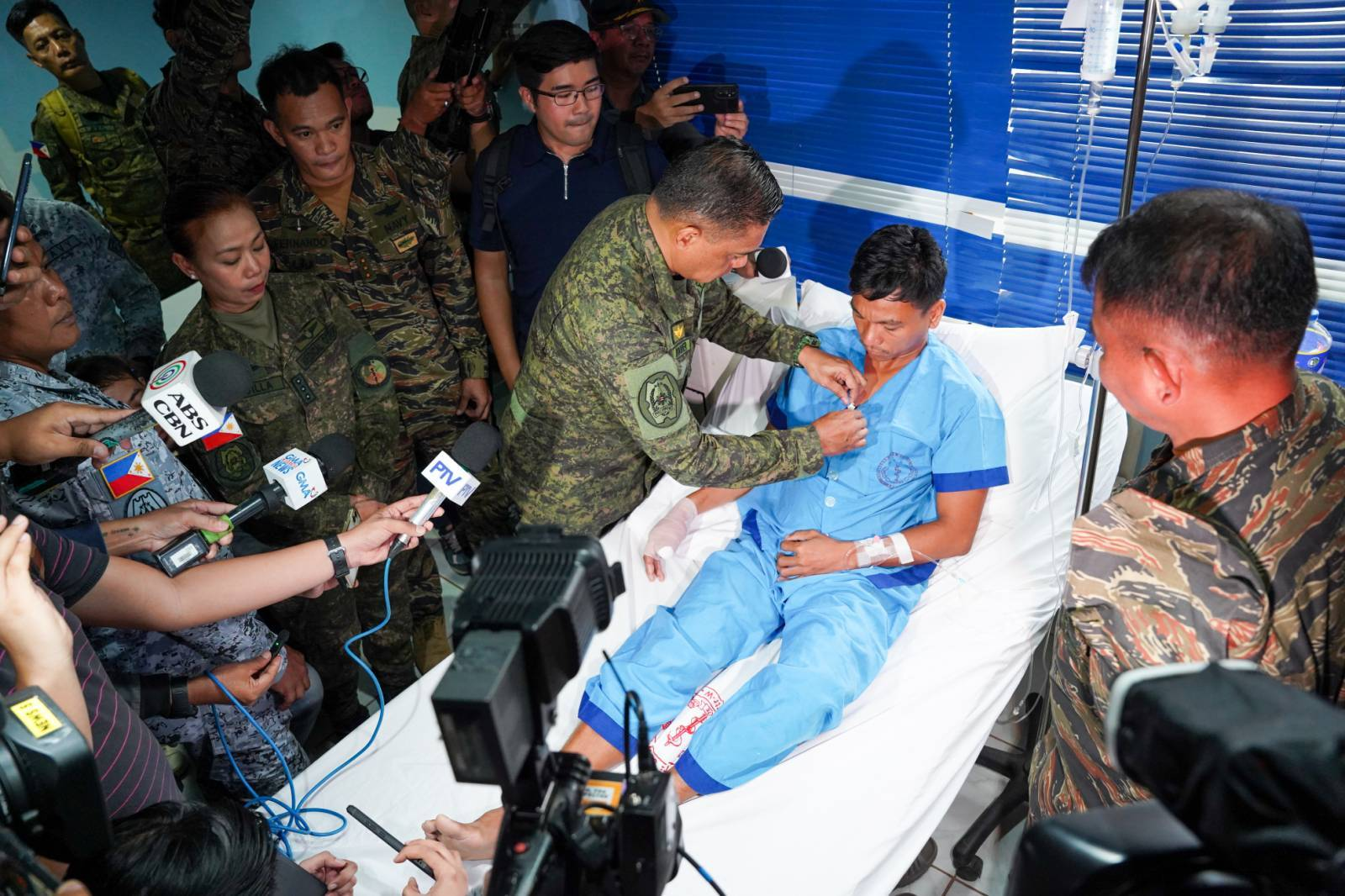
Philippine Armed Forces Chief of Staff Admiral Romeo Brauner Jr. visits Philippine Navy Diver First Class Jeffrey Facundo, who lost his right thumb in the incident, and awards him a medal

Armed Forces of the Philippines (AFP) chief Romeo Brawner Jr. described China's action as a "hijacking" and as "piracy" and demanded reparations. He said that the Filipino personnel involved deserved medals for their valor.

Former Justice Antonio Carpio believes that the incident does not constitute as an "armed attack" that would invoke the Philippines Mutual Defense Treaty (MDT) with the United States but has acknowledged the incident as an "escalation". As of June 21, there is no discussion on the invocation of the MDT by the Philippine government.

President Bongbong Marcos says that the Philippines is "not in the business to instigate wars" in regards to the South China Sea dispute though he add that his country's declared "calm and peaceful disposition" should not "mistaken for acquiescence". He also conferred the 80 Filipino personnel who took part in the mission, the Order of Lapu-Lapu with the rank of Kamagi.

The PCG also conferred the Distinguished Coast Guard Cross and Ribbon the 70 crew members of the BRP Cabra and Bagacay.

==== Recovery ====
A Seaman First Class Underwater Operator in the Philippine Navy, who lost his right thumb during a clash with the China Coast Guard in June, has successfully undergone surgery to rebuild his severed finger. After a series of procedures at a medical center, doctors used a bone from his rib cage to create a new thumb. According to a spokesperson for the Armed Forces, it will take about 18 months of rehab for the new thumb to work fully.

=== Other countries ===
The United States reiterates its support to the Philippines through the Mutual Defense Treaty (MDT). It said that armed attacks could be a basis to invoke the treaty. Australia, Canada, Finland, Germany, Japan, the Netherlands, New Zealand, and South Korea, as well as the European Union condemned China's actions or expressed concerns.

== See also ==
- Atin Ito Christmas convoy
- August 2023 Second Thomas Shoal standoff
- Second Thomas Shoal laser incident
- Scarborough Shoal standoff
- Whitsun Reef incident
