= Atin Ito Coalition =

Philippine civic group advocating for sovereignty and democratic rights

- West Philippine Sea – Atin Ito!
- Formation: 2023; 3 years ago
- Type: Non-governmental coalition
- Purpose: Support for Philippine sovereignty claims in the territorial disputes in the South China Sea
- Location: Philippines
- Methods: Convoy of boats, deployment of buoys in the contested areas, delivery of supplies to Filipino soldiers and fishers

West Philippine Sea – Atin Ito! (transl. This is Ours!), commonly known as the Atin Ito Coalition, is a civilian-led initiative that organizes supply and solidarity missions for Filipino personnel stationed in the Spratly Islands in the South China Sea. The coalition advocates for the Philippines' sovereignty claims in the West Philippine Sea.

== Background ==
West Philippine Sea – Atin Ito (transl. West Philippines Sea – It is Ours) is a civilian-led initiative to launch expeditions in support of the Philippines' claim in the South China Sea dispute. It is also in opposition to the People's Republic of China's assertions of its own territorial claim over the sea.

Its name bears the designation West Philippine Sea, a name introduced by the Philippine government to refer to parts of the South China Sea covering waters and islands claimed by the Philippines including the Spratly Islands and Scarborough Shoal.

Atin Ito includes members of Akbayan, Pambansang Katipunan ng mga Samahan sa Kanayunan (PKSK), and the Philippine Rural Reconstruction Movement (PRRM).

== Activities ==
=== 2023 Christmas convoy ===
Atin Ito Christmas convoy
- Part of Territorial disputes in the South China Sea
- Date: December 10, 2023
- Location: Spratly Islands, South China Sea
- Caused by: Philippine sovereignty claims to parts of the South China Sea; China's implementation of its sovereignty claim over the whole sea
- Goals: Sail near Second Thomas Shoal; Deliver supplies to Filipino troops in Nanshan and Flat Islands
- Result: Second Thomas Shoal planned visit cancelled; Goods delivered to Filipino troops in Nanshan

Parties
Philippines: Atin Ito Coalition; Philippine Coast Guard	China: People's Liberation Army Navy; China Coast Guard

Lead figures
(Philippines) Rafaela David (Philippines) Jorge Dela Cruz	

Number
40 marine vessels: M/V Kapitan Felix Oca; 40 boats; 1 ship: BRP Melchora Aquino	3 ships: Chinese destroyer Changsha (173); Second Chinese naval ship; Chinese Coast Guard vessel 5305

==== Planning ====
The Atin Ito coalition planned on holding a convoy of marine vessels to deliver donated supplies to Filipino troops stationed at the grounded BRP Sierra Madre at Second Thomas Shoal.

The National Security Council (NSC) has cautioned against the plan saying the organization could visit other Philippine occupied features in the Spratlys. It also suggest turning over donations to the Philippine Navy and Philippine Coast Guard instead. The coalition insist that it would push through with their plan despite the discouragement. The NSC would eventually approve the convoy on the condition that its vessels would only pass through the general area near Second Thomas Shoal. The National Task Force for the West Philippine Sea also approved of the plan.

The final plan is for the convoy to sail near Second Thomas Shoal and Nanshan and Flat Islands. The convoy was to consist 40 boats with a "mother vessel" which could accommodate 100 people.

==== Mission ====
M/V Kapitan Felix Oca, the lead ship of the Christmas convoy with 40 volunteers departed from Manila for El Nido, Palawan on December 8, 2023. Carrying humanitarian supplies meant for Filipinos in the Spratlys Islands, the ship arrived in El Nido the following day.

The Christmas convoy, officially commenced in the early morning of December 10. The marine vessels departed from El Nido's San Fernando Port. The convoy had a total of 200 people which includes 100 fishers, 20 youth and student leaders, 20 sectoral representatives as well as 60 journalists working for domestic and international media outlets. The Philippine Coast Guard's BRP Melchora Aquino served as ecort.

The plan for the Christmas convoy was revised due to a separate incident during the morning between Filipino and Chinese ships involving the Second Thomas Shoal. This cancelled the Atin To's plan to sail near the shoal. China later laid blame on the Philippines for the encounter.

In the afternoon, Kapitan Felix was heading towards Nanshan Island when it decided to go back to El Nido. A mass was being held by its passengers when two People’s Liberation Army Navy ships including Chinese destroyer Changsha (173) and Chinese Coast Guard vessel 5305 appeared nearby.

ML Chowee, a smaller vessel part of the convoy, sailed a different route from Kapitan Felix. Evading bigger Chinese vessels, it was able to deliver supplies to Filipino troops in Nanshan Island in the morning.

==== Reception ====
Bishop Broderick Pabillo of the Apostolic Vicariate of Taytay in Palawan expressed support for the conduct of the Christmas convoy.

=== May 2024 convoy ===
Shortly after the conduct of the Christmas convoy, the Atin Ito Coalition vowed to organize future resupply missions with the next one projected to be held in early 2024.

A convoy would visit Scarborough Shoal on May 15, 2024. The convoy consists of five "mother boats" and 100 smaller fishing boats. The Philippine Coast Guard's BRP Bagacay would escort the mission. The China Coast Guard's vessels Nos. 4108 and 4109 would challenge the convoy.

== See also ==
- Second Thomas Shoal laser incident
- August 2023 Second Thomas Shoal standoff
- Scarborough Shoal standoff
- Whitsun Reef incident
