= Second Thomas Shoal incident =

Second Thomas Shoal incident may refer to the following:

- 2023 Second Thomas Shoal laser incident
- August 2023 Second Thomas Shoal standoff
- June 2024 Second Thomas Shoal incident
