= 2023 Second Thomas Shoal incident =

2023 Second Thomas Shoal incident may refer to either two confrontations between China and the Philippines in the Second Thomas Shoal:

- Second Thomas Shoal laser incident
- August 2023 Second Thomas Shoal standoff
