= 2023 Second Thomas Shoal laser incident =

Involved China using a laser against a Philippine ship in February 2023

Second Thomas Shoal laser incident
- Part of South China Sea disputes
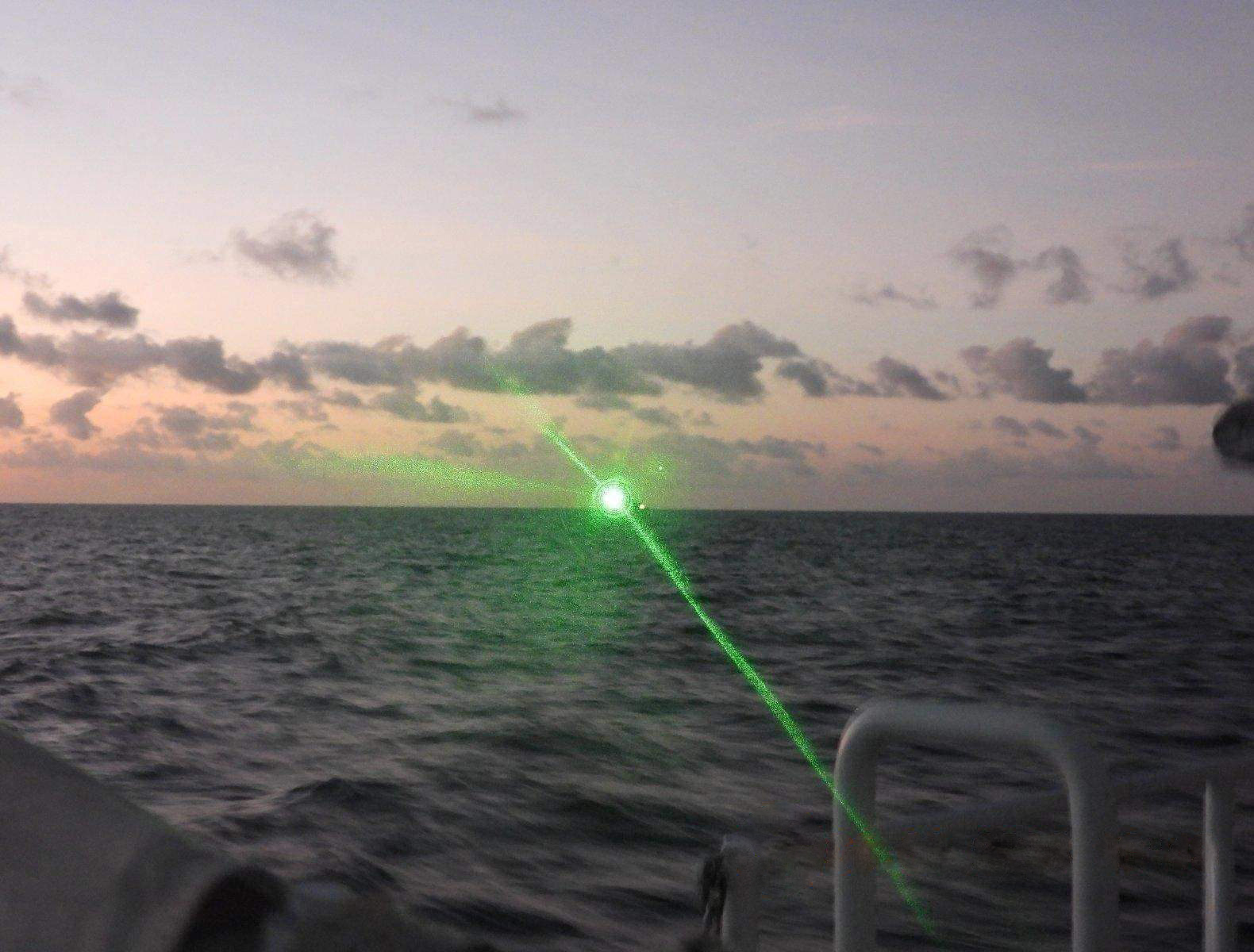
- CCG 5205 pointing a laser at BRP Malapascua
Date	February 6, 2023
Location	Second Thomas Shoal, South China Sea

Belligerents
Philippines	China

Units involved
Philippine Coast Guard: BRP Malapascua	China Coast Guard: CCG 5205

On February 6, 2023, the China Coast Guard and Philippine Coast Guard had an encounter near the Second Thomas Shoal. The shoal is one of the features of the Spratly Islands, which is subject to a wider dispute in the South China Sea.

The Second Thomas Shoal is claimed by multiple countries, including China and the Philippines. The latter controls the feature, having grounded the BRP Sierra Madre on the shoal.

The BRP Malapascua of the Philippine Coast Guard was heading towards the shoal for a rotation and resupply mission for the BRP Sierra Madre crew when CCG 5205 of the China Coast Guard blocked the Filipino coast guard ship to act upon what it viewed as an intrusion of the Philippine vessel and aimed a green laser light towards it.

The Philippine side alleged the laser was "military grade" and caused its crew to suffer from temporary blindness, which China denied. The incident led the Philippines to file a diplomatic protest.

== Incident ==
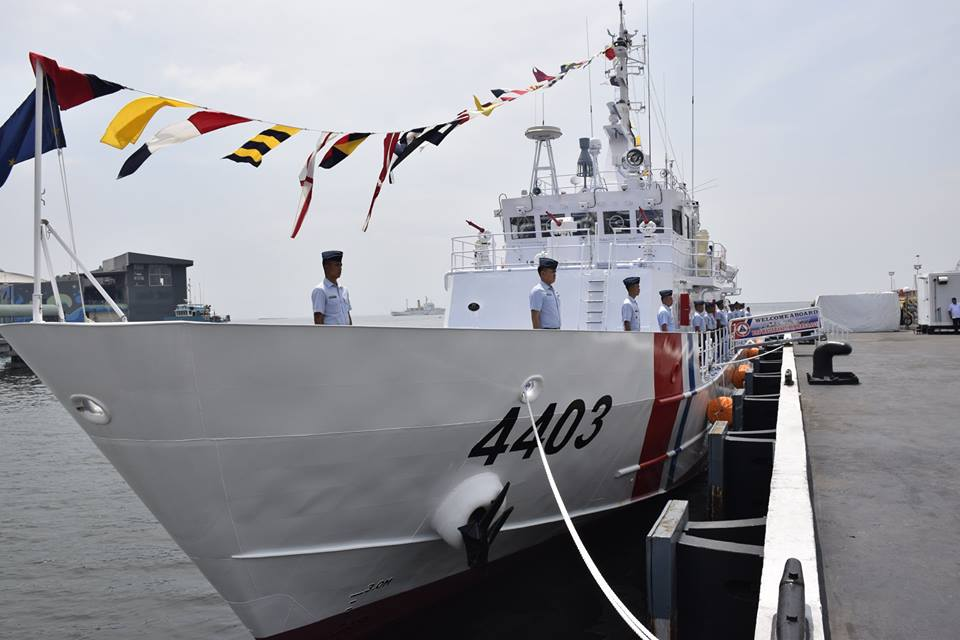
BRP Malapascua

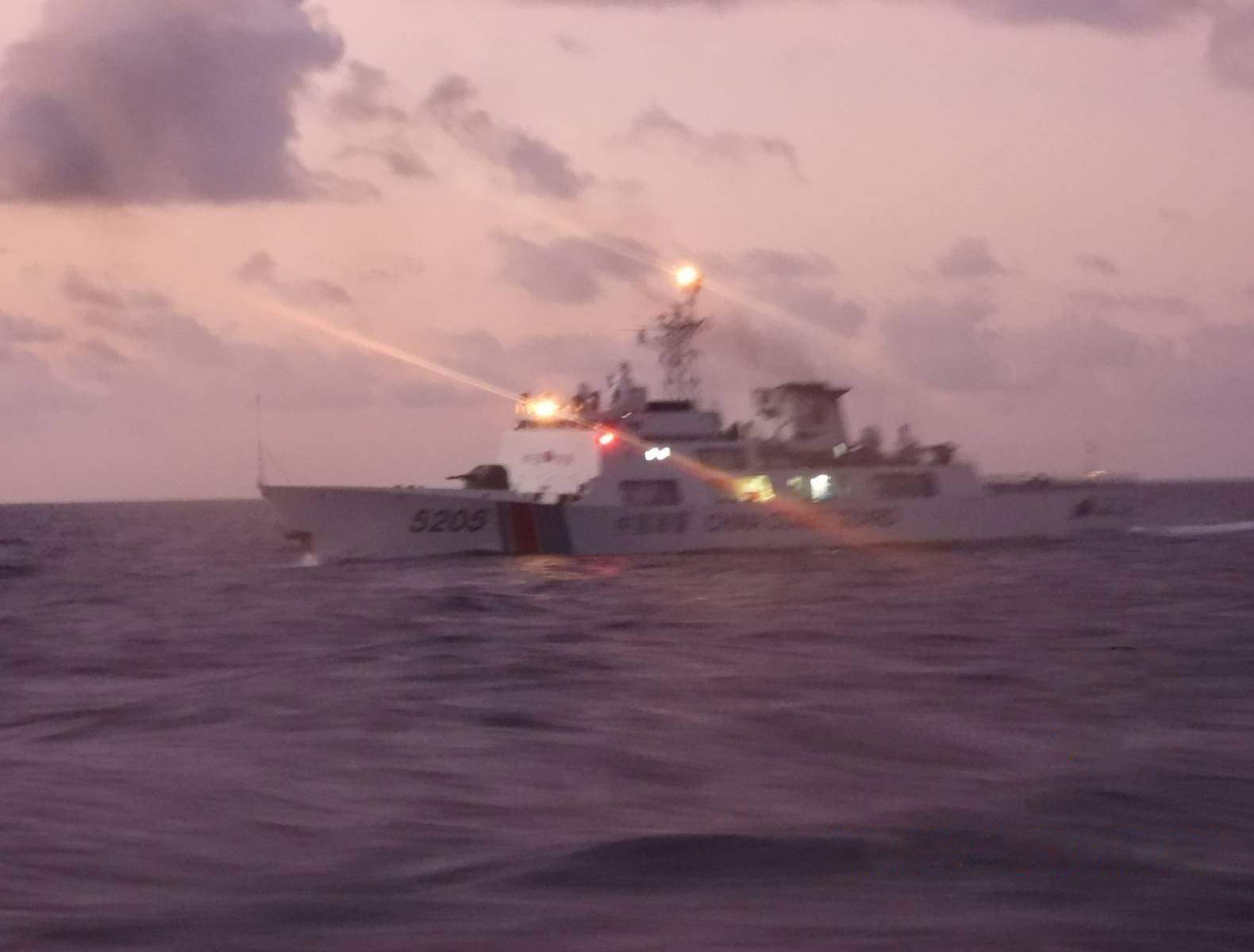
CCG 5205

According to the Philippine Coast Guard (PCG), on February 6, 2023, the BRP Malapascua was aiding the Philippine Navy in conducting a rotation and resupply (RoRE) mission, delivering a food and supply cargo to the crew of the grounded BRP Sierra Madre at the Philippines-controlled Second Thomas Shoal, when a ship from the China Coast Guard (CCG) with bow number 5205 deliberately blocked the Philippines' coast guard ship.

BRP Malapascua was 10 nautical miles (19 km; 12 mi) away from Second Thomas Shoal when it spotted the CCG vessel 4 nautical miles (7.4 km; 4.6 mi) ahead and was maneuvering from the PCG ship's left to block it. The CCG ship then beamed against the PCG ship a green laser light, which the PCG claimed to be of "military-grade" that caused its crew to suffer from temporary blindness. The PCG added that the Chinese ship came as close as 150 yards (140 m) to the right of BRP Malapascua.

BRP Malapascua then headed, along with BRP Teresa Magbanua, towards Nanshan Island to resume its maritime patrol and RoRE mission to stations within the Spratlys.

== Reactions ==
=== Philippines ===
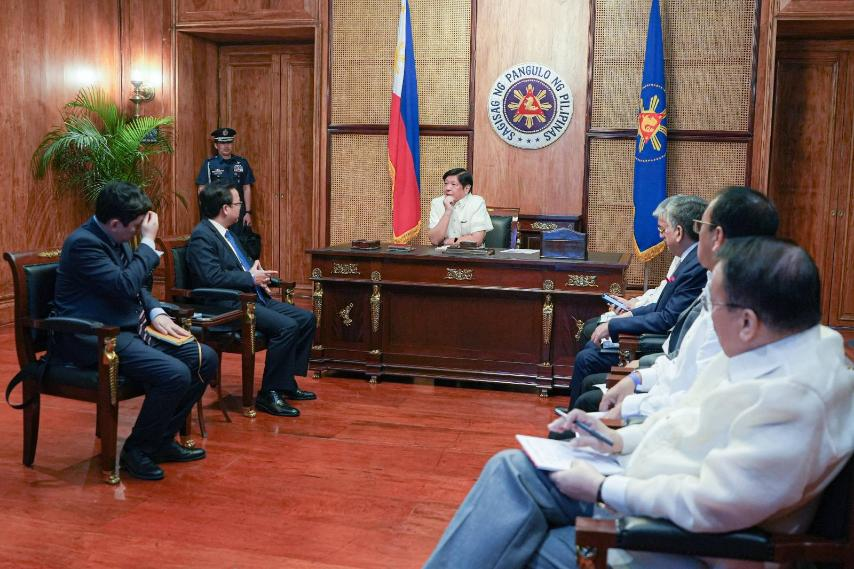
President Bongbong Marcos summoned Chinese ambassador Huang Xilian

On February 14, 2023, President Bongbong Marcos summoned Chinese Ambassador to the Philippines Huang Xilian over the incident to express concern over "the increasing frequency and intensity of actions" of China against the Philippine Coast Guard and Filipino fishermen. The Department of Foreign Affairs also filed a formal diplomatic protest.

Responding to an inquiry by the media, Marcos said that while the incident is clearly an "act of aggression", it is not enough reason to invoke the Mutual Defense Treaty with the United States.

The National Task Force for the West Philippine Sea said it would formulate new rules and procedures on how to deal with another potential laser-pointing and other encounters which it considers as harassment from China in the South China Sea.

=== China ===
China maintains defended its actions in the Second Thomas Shoal. It said it was only acting upon what they view as an "intrusion" of the Philippines side to its territory and insist that it was professional and restrained in dealing the issue. It says that the Philippine Coast Guard's account of the incident did "not reflect the truth". It also added that the light used was from a hand-held laser speed detector and hand-held greenlight pointer used to "measure the distance and speed of the Philippine vessel and signal directions to ensure navigation safety" and does not inflict damage on anything or anyone.

The Philippines' Department of Foreign Affairs in response told China to engage the Philippines in "truth and goodwill" standing by the account of the Philippine Coast Guard on what happened saying that there is "lack of congruence" between China's statements and what it believes to be the "actual events in the seas".

Ambassador Huang on February 7, 2023, would cite the "lack of communication" between his country and the Philippines over the incident and pushed for stronger dialogue mechanisms between the two countries to avoid similar incidents in the future.

=== Other countries ===
The United States Department of State issued a statement in support of the Philippines following the Second Thomas Shoal incident calling China's use of laser as "provocative and unsafe". Australia, Japan, and Germany likewise expressed concern over the incident.

== See also ==
- Atin Ito Christmas convoy
- August 2023 Second Thomas Shoal standoff
- Scarborough Shoal standoff
- Whitsun Reef incident
- June 2024 Second Thomas Shoal incident
