= Cabbage tactics =

Chinese naval tactic

Cabbage tactics are a naval swarming practice used by China to encircle, blockade and seize control of islands and shoals, most notably during territorial disputes in the South China Sea in the 21st century. Instead of a direct amphibious invasion, the targeted island is surrounded by successive maritime patrol lines consisting of People's Liberation Army Navy surface ships and patrol aircraft, China Coast Guard and Maritime Militia patrol vessels, and even fishing fleets. The pattern of blockade is similar to a siege investment in land warfare, and has been figuratively compared with the alternating layers of leaves wrapping around a cabbage's core/stem, hence the name.

The practice is considered a "grey-zone" tactic whose purpose is to screen and interdict maritime transport to and from the island, effectively isolating the island from outside contacts and cutting off its reinforcements and logistical support. Once any prior occupants of the island all had to withdraw due to logistical depletion, the blockading forces can then land and claim the abandoned island unchallenged, all while maintaining de jure peace and avoiding the casualty and diplomatic fallout of an open conflict.

== Definition ==
The term "cabbage tactics" was first coined by now-retired military theorist Zhang Zhaozhong, who was a rear admiral of the People's Liberation Army Navy (PLAN) and a doctoral advisor at the National Defense University. According to The New York Times Magazine, Zhang Zhaozhong "described a 'cabbage strategy', which entails surrounding a contested area with so many boats — fishermen, fishing administration ships, marine surveillance ships, navy warships — that 'the island is thus wrapped layer by layer like a cabbage'." It is a tactic to overwhelm and seize control of an island without actually assaulting it, instead by surrounding and wrapping the island in successive lines of naval ships, patrol vessels and fishing boats, as well as patrol aircraft and drones. It has also been called small-stick diplomacy.

Ahmet Goncu, an associate professor at China's Xi'an Jiaotong-Liverpool University, stated: "Whenever there is a conflicted small island, the Chinese military and paramilitary forces are sent to overwhelm the islands and lay siege to the surrounding islands with military ships, fishing boats along with other kinds of paramilitary vessels." The layers of Chinese vessels block the entry or exit of any other country's navies, thus effectively isolating the island and bringing it under Chinese control. The strategy also involves the People's Armed Forces Maritime Militia, which includes fishermen, serving as a first line of defense. The goal of cabbage tactics is to create a layered envelopment of the target.

== History ==
Examples of Chinese cabbage tactics include the swarming of contested islands in the South China Sea, which also entailed the construction of artificial islands, and the occupation of disputed areas along the Sino-Indian border. Cabbage tactics has also been used to intimidate military vessels. For instance, in 2009 the United States Navy survey ship USNS Impeccable encountered cabbage tactics from Chinese maritime forces. In 2013, The New York Times Magazine published a multimedia feature piece exploring the South China Sea that covered the concept of cabbage tactics in depth.

== Usage ==
The usage of this tactic has been seen at:

- Scarborough Reef in the South China Sea from Philippines in 2012
- Ayungin Island in the Spratlys also from Philippines in 2013
- Vietnam's claimed EEZ was encroached by installing a CNOOC oil rig
- Pagasa Island in the South China Sea in 2019.

== See also ==
- China's salami slicing
- Grey-zone (international relations)
- Hybrid warfare
