= Maritime Militia =

Chinese paramilitary organization

Chinese Maritime Militia
- 中国海上民兵
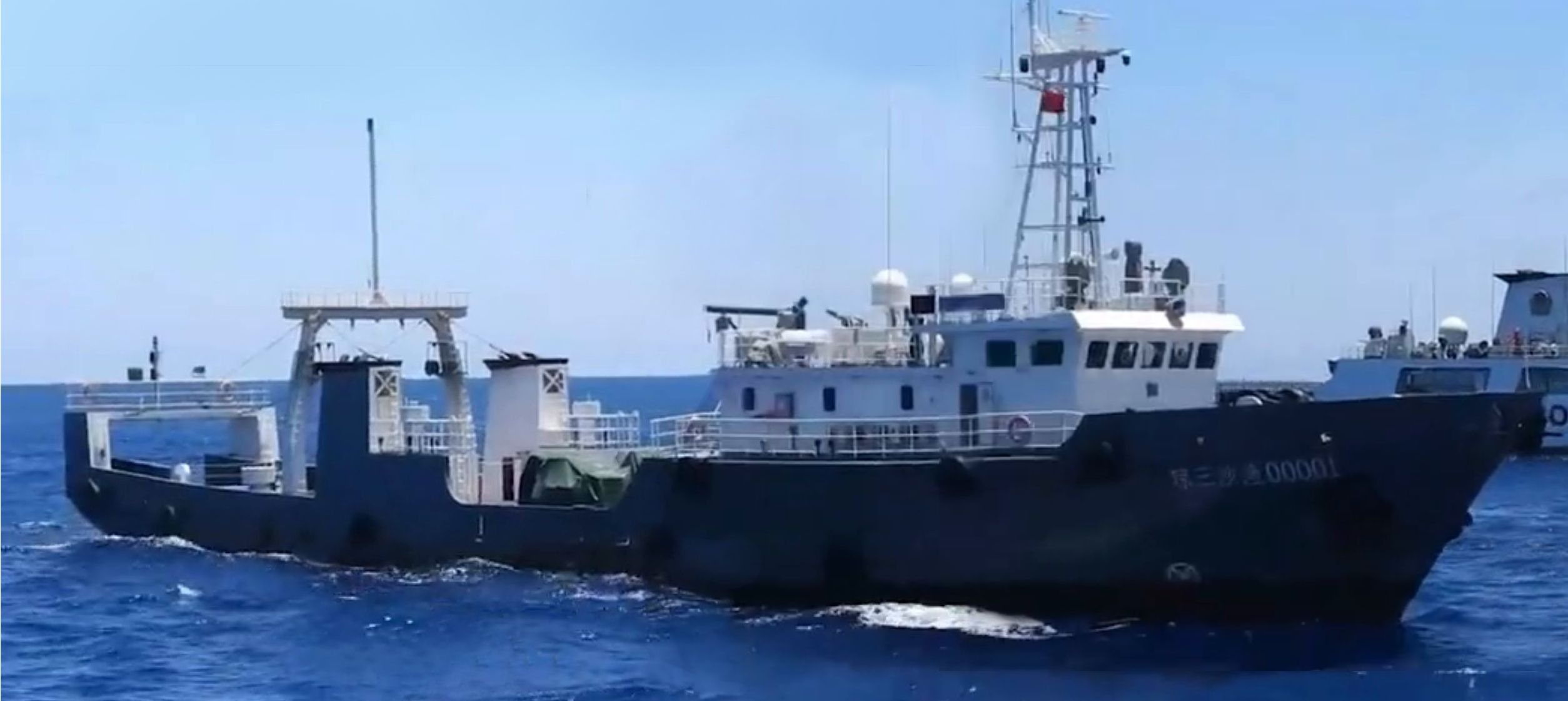
- A purpose-built Chinese Maritime Militia ship (type WAG FT-16) intercepting a Filipino vessel resupplying a Spratly outpost, 2023
- Country: China
- Allegiance: Chinese Communist Party
- Type: Maritime militia
- Role: Naval patrols, reconnaissance, search and rescue; greyzone warfare; Law Enforcement; commercial fishing
- Fleet: 370,000 non-powered FVs (2015); 672,000 powered FVs (2015)
- Engagements: Battle of the Paracel Islands; Harassment of the USNS Impeccable; Senkaku Islands incidents; Great Wall of Sand; Scarborough Shoal standoff; Hai Yang Shi You 981 standoff; Whitsun Reef incident

The Chinese Maritime Militia (CMM; Chinese: 中国海上民兵), also called China's Maritime Militia, the People's Armed Force Maritime Militia (PAFMM) the Fishery Militia (渔政民兵), and informally known as the Chinese naval militia, is a naval militia of the People's Republic of China (PRC). It is the smallest of the three maritime forces used in Chinese sea patrol operations, next to the China Coast Guard (CCG) and the People's Liberation Army Navy (PLAN).

The maritime militia takes part in anti-access and area denial missions in areas of the Pacific Ocean claimed by China. By using law enforcement and "civilian" fishing vessels, the PRC is able to use "greyzone" tactics, avoiding a military conflict while still pursuing and enforcing its maritime claims.

== Name ==
The US Military refers to the Maritime Militia as the People's Armed Forces Maritime Militia (PAFMM).

For reportedly operating in the South China Sea without clear identification, they are sometimes referred to as the "little blue men", a term coined by Andrew S. Erickson of the Naval War College, in reference to Russia's "little green men" during its 2014 annexation of Crimea.

== History ==
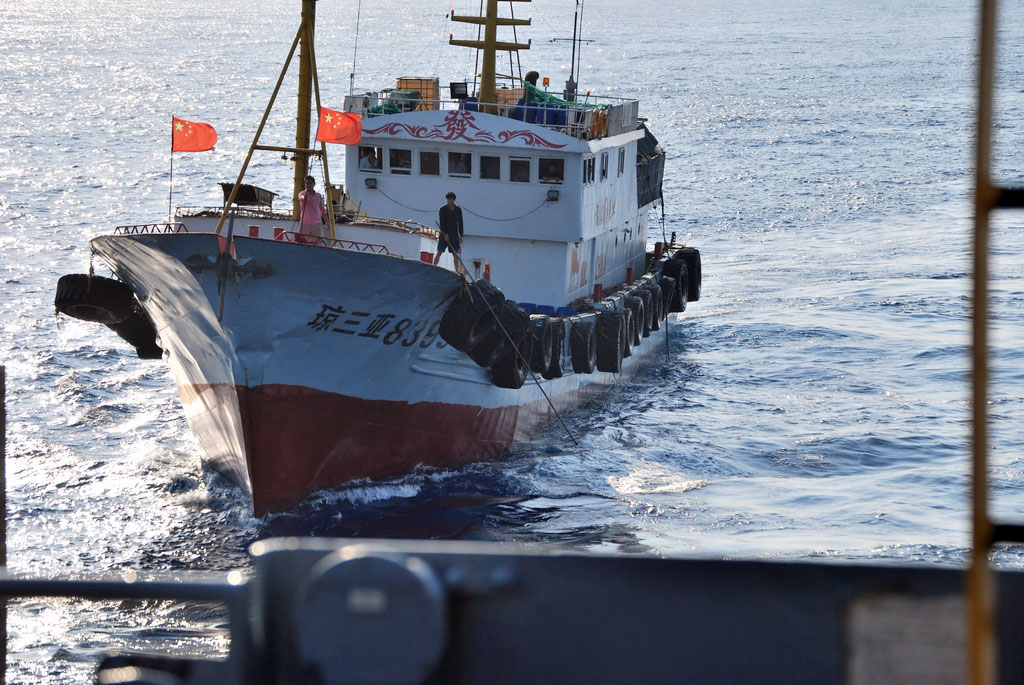
A crewmember on a Chinese trawler uses a grapple hook in an attempt to snag the towed acoustic array of USNS Impeccable in international waters, 8 March 2009

China's maritime militia was established after the Chinese Communist Party (CCP) won the Chinese Civil War and forced the Kuomintang (KMT) to flee the mainland to Taiwan. The newly consolidated communist government needed to augment their maritime defenses against the nationalist forces, which had retreated offshore and remained entrenched on a number of coastal islands. Therefore, the concept of people's war was applied to the sea with fishermen and other nautical laborers being drafted into a maritime militia. The nationalists had maintained a maritime militia during their time in power, but the communist government preferred to craft theirs anew given their suspicion of organizations created by the nationalists. The CCP also instituted a national-level maritime militia command to unite the local militias, something the KMT had never done. In the early 1950s, the Bureau of Aquatic Products played a key role in institutionalizing and strengthening the maritime militia as it collectivized local fisheries. Bureau of Aquatic Products leaders were also generally former high-ranking PLAN officers which lead to close relations between the organizations. The formation of the maritime militia was influenced by the Soviet "Young School" of military theory, which emphasized coastal defense over naval power projection for nascent communist powers.

The maritime militia was particularly important from the 1950s through the 1970s, during which it had a significant role in national defense and territorial assertion.

In the 1960s and 1970s, the PLAN established maritime militia schools near the three main fleet headquarters of Qingdao, Shanghai, and Guangzhou. Through the first half of the 1970s, the maritime militia mostly stayed near shore and close to China. However, by the later 1970s, the maritime militia had evolved an important sovereignty support function which brought it into increasing conflict with China's neighbors, especially in the South China Sea.

The maritime militia contributed significantly to the 1974 Battle of the Paracel Islands against South Vietnam especially in providing amphibious lift capacity to Chinese forces. Militia presence also significantly slowed the South Vietnamese forces.

The maritime militia was significant in asserting territorial claims during 1974 swarming operations at the Senkaku/Diaoyu islands in the East China Sea.

=== Operational history since the 2000s ===
In the 2000s, the involvement of the maritime militia in more aggressive operations, namely, the physical interference with the navigation of US Navy ships, increased.

China's fishing fleet was being downsized until 2008, when maritime militia funding lead instead to an expansion. This expansion has led to an increase in illegal, unreported and unregulated fishing.

In 2019, the United States issued a warning to China over aggressive and unsafe action by their Coast Guard and maritime militia.

The maritime militia is believed to be behind a number of incidents in the South China Sea where high powered lasers were pointed at the cockpits of aircraft. This includes an attack against a Royal Australian Navy helicopter.

In 2022, satellite images showed that more than a hundred militia vessels operated in the South China Sea on a daily basis. The number of vessels peaked in July 2022, when around 400 militia vessels were deployed in the South China Sea. The movement and the observed behavior of the militia vessels remained consistent over the years.

In 2023, militia activity around key features in the South China Sea averaged 195 vessels per day, representing a 35 percent increase from the previous year.

In June 2025, a Chinese maritime militia vessel with hull number 16838 ran aground near Pag-asa Island in the West Philippine Sea and, for the first time on record, deployed a parachute anchor that dragged across a coral reef. The anchor caused significant damage to 307 square meters of coral, marking the first documented case of a Chinese militia vessel inflicting reef destruction through this method within Philippine waters. The incident highlighted growing concerns over the environmental impact of maritime militia operations in ecologically protected zones.

== Structure and characteristics ==
China's fishing militia consists of a mixture of purpose-built maritime militia fishing vessels (MMFV) as well as normal fishing boats, called Spratly Backbone Fishing Vessels (SBFVs), which get recruited by the central government via various subsidy programs. Most of the boats are between 45 and 65 meters long. A vast majority of the fleet is owned by natural persons, and not the government itself. This means, a large part of the armed mass organization is made up of civilians, who still maintain regular jobs in the marine economy, while being part of the militia. Although the militia is independent from the PLAN and the CCG, it is trained by both. The maritime militia operates from mainly ten ports within the Guangdong and Hainan Provinces of China. In 2026, The Economist reported that the authorities can pay a militia boat owner over US$3,500 per day to loiter, which covers costs while no fishing is being undertaken.

=== Command and control ===
The Maritime Militia is required to operate in certain areas and support the military. The militia is funded through various government subsidies, and some personnel receive full-time salaries from state-owned companies.

Command and coordination arrangements of the maritime militia are unclear and only a weak exertion of control on fishermen can be noticed. Since most members of the maritime militia are simultaneously fishermen, they regularly pursue their own agendas, sometimes contradictory to what the government wants. For instance, multiple fishermen went against the central government by using maritime militia policy to fish for protected and endangered species in disputed waters.

Moreover, factors such as food security and economic advantages influence fishermen to operate outside of China's exclusive economic zone, since the PRCs jurisdictional waters are polluted, and a depletion of China's fishery resources can be noticed. Therefore, while the maritime militia is involved in greyzone operations, it is misleading to portray it as a professional coherent body, which can be systematically used by the central government.

=== Capabilities ===
The Maritime Militia has utilized both rented fishing vessels and purpose-built ships in its operations.

Although the maritime militia is part of the armed forces of the PRC, in 2018 it was usually unarmed. The violence used by the militia is mostly limited to dangerous maneuvers and, on occasion, the ramming or shouldering of other vessels. Professional militia vessels can be equipped with large water cannons. Most vessels are issued with navigation and communication equipment while some are also issued small arms. Some Maritime Militia units are equipped with naval mines and anti-aircraft weapons.

The communications systems can be used both for communication and espionage. Often, fishermen supply their own vessels. However, there are also core contingents of the maritime militia who operate vessels fitted out for militia work instead of fishing; these vessels feature reinforced bows for ramming and high-powered water cannons. The increasing sophistication of militia vessels' communication equipment is a double-edged sword for Chinese authorities. New equipment, as well as training in its use, has substantially improved command, control, and coordination of militia units. However, the vessels' resulting professionalism and sophisticated maneuvers make them more identifiable as government-sponsored actors, dampening their ability to function as a gray-zone force. Such improvements also potentially make militia vessels more threatening during at-sea confrontations, raising the risk of unintended escalations with foreign militaries.

== Tasks ==
The PRC considers its large fishing fleet an essential part of its sea power, helping with the pursuit of its maritime interests in disputed waters. The maritime militia carries out three different tasks in China's dispute strategy, also referred to as maritime rights protection: It is active in disputes over the territorial features as well as disputes over the extent of zones of jurisdictions, and it regulates foreign activities - especially military activities - in waters claimed by the PRC. While the first two tasks target mostly neighboring countries, such as Brunei, Indonesia, Japan, Malaysia, the Philippines, Taiwan, and Vietnam and their conflicting interests in the South China and East China Sea, the third task is primarily a response to the Freedom of Navigation Operations (FONOPs) by the US.

According to a Congressional Research Service report, the Maritime Militia and coast guard are deployed more regularly than the PLAN in maritime sovereignty-assertion operations.

=== Grey-zone warfare ===
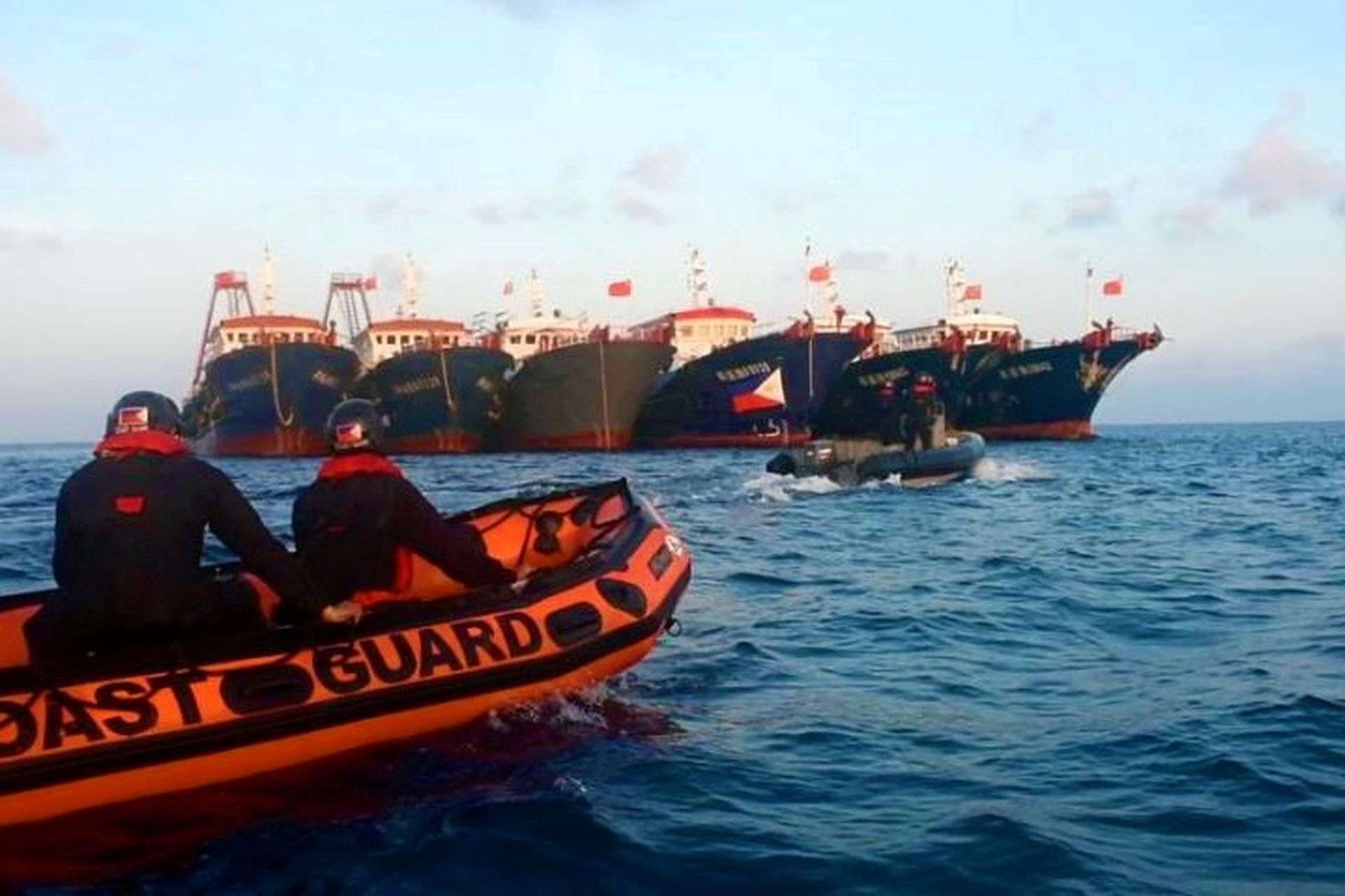
The Philippine Coast Guard approaches Maritime Militia vessels during the Whitsun Reef incident, April 13, 2021

Various academic journals and media articles claim that the maritime militia increasingly takes part in anti-access and area denial missions in a continuously growing area of the western Pacific in what has been described as grey-zone warfare. By using law enforcement and fishing vessels, instead of traditional naval assets, the PRC is able to stay with its actions in a grey zone, avoiding a military conflict while still being able to successfully pursue its maritime claims. The use of the maritime militia, which consists of civilians, allows the PRC to benefit from the legal ambiguity and the diplomatic arbitrariness coming from the involvement of civilians in such maritime operations.

According to research from the Taiwanese Institute for National Defense and Security Research, China's maritime militia is part of their "grey zone" tactics, which are used to wage conflict against China's neighbors without crossing the threshold into conventional war. The maritime militia is a particularly useful gray zone force because Chinese authorities can deny or claim affiliation with its members depending on context. China can send its militia to harass foreign vessels in contested areas, but publicly assert that the vessels are independent from government control, thus avoiding escalation with other states. At the same time, if militia members are hurt during confrontations with foreign vessels, the Chinese government can claim the need to "defend" its own fishermen, mobilizing domestic nationalism to improve its bargaining position in a crisis.

China conducts maritime gray‑zone operations affecting both Taiwan and the Philippines - deploying civilian and quasi‑military vessels and dual‑use infrastructure in waters around Taiwan, the Scarborough Shoal and the Second Thomas Shoal - thereby undermining Taiwan's maritime jurisdiction and hampering the Philippines' access and maritime rights in its Exclusive Economic Zone. Chinese maritime militia vessels conduct "gray zone" surveillance in the waters near the Taiwan Strait median line.

Some of the incidents, which are generally defined as greyzone operations within the academic discourse, are the harassment of the USNS Impeccable in 2009, the Senkaku Island incident in 2010, the Scarborough Shoal standoff in 2012, the Hai Yang Shi You 981 standoff in 2014, the Natuna Islands incident in 2016 and the Whitsun Reef incident in 2021.

== See also ==
- Cabbage tactics
- Chinese salami slicing theory
- Territorial disputes in the South China Sea
