= BRP Malapascua =

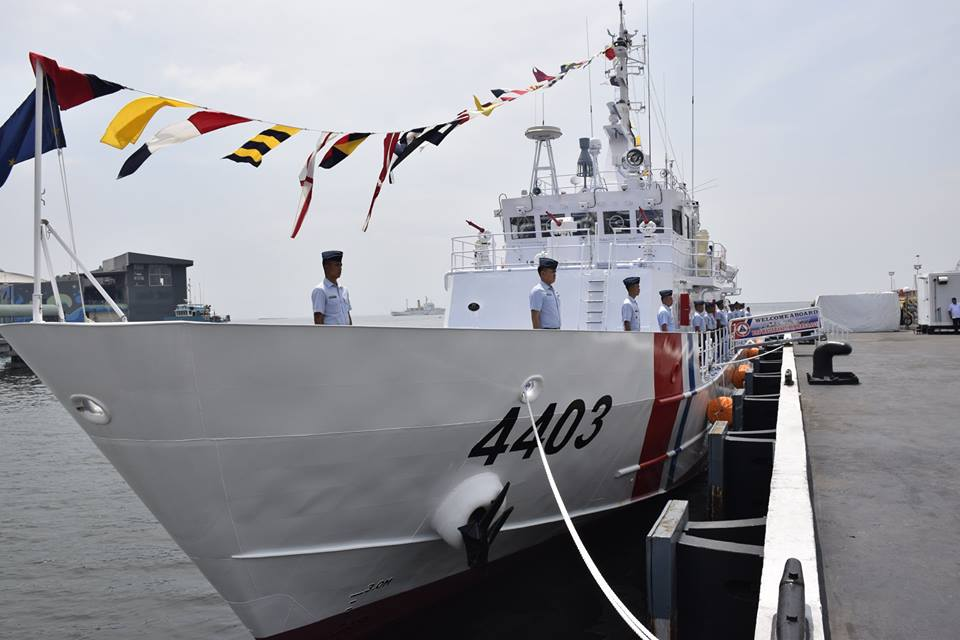
- BRP Malapascua (MRRV-4403) during commissioning rites

History

Philippines
- Name: BRP Malapascua
- Namesake: Lighthouse Malapascua located in Malapascua Island, Cebu
- Ordered: 29 May 2015
- Builder: Japan Marine United Corporation, Yokohama, Japan
- Completed: January 2017
- Commissioned: 7 March 2017
- Identification: MMSI number: 548143500; Callsign: 4DFN5; Hull number: MRRV-4403
- Status: in active service

General characteristics
- Class & type: Parola-class patrol vessel
- Length: 44.5 m (146 ft)
- Beam: 7.5 m (25 ft)
- Draft: 4 m (4.0 m)
- Propulsion: 2 × MTU 12V4000M93L 12-cylinder diesel engines, Total diesel engine output: 3,460 shp (2,580 kW)
- Speed: Maximum @ 25 knots (46 km/h), cruising 15 knots (28 km/h)
- Range: 1,500 nautical miles (2,800 km)
- Boats & landing craft carried: 1 × RHIB work boat
- Complement: 25 (5 officers, 20 enlisted)
- Sensors & processing systems: Furuno FAR series X & S-band navigation radars

BRP Malapascua (MRRV-4403) is the third ship of the Parola-class patrol vessels of the Philippine Coast Guard.

== Design and features ==
The Philippine Coast Guard clarified that the ship is a law enforcement vessel and is designed to conduct environmental and humanitarian missions, as well as maritime security operations and patrol missions.

The ship was designed with a bulletproof navigation bridge, and is equipped with fire monitors, night vision capability, a work boat, and radio direction finder capability.

The ship will be equipped with communications and radio monitoring equipment from Rohde & Schwarz, specifically the M3SR Series 4400 and Series 4100 software-defined communication radios, and DDF205 radio monitoring equipment. These equipment enhances the ship's reconnaissance, pursuit and communications capabilities.

== Delivery and commissioning ==
The ship left Yokohama, Japan on February 27, 2017, and arrived in the Port of Manila on March 3, 2017.with CDR Garydale Gimotea being her first commanding officer.

BRP Malapascua was commissioned during a commissioning ceremony held at Philippine Coast Guard headquarters in Manila on March 7, 2017, with CDR Garydale Gimotea being her first commanding officer. The ceremony was attended by the Speaker of the House of Representatives Cong. Pantaleon Alvarez, and Department of Transportation Sec. Arthur Tugade.

== Service history ==
The ship has distinguished itself in challenging missions. Notable of which are the patrols conducted in Benham Rise, Inabangga, Bohol terrorist incident. The vessel was also stationed in Mindanao conducting security patrols in the waters Basilan, Jolo, Tawi-tawi and supported the government's campaign in Marawi. Further, BRP Malapascua has responded to the people of Palawan, during the TS Vinta and TS Agaton, and saved many typhoon victims in Mangsee Island. The Officers and men of BRP Malapascua have carried out the PCG manuella.

On 6 February 2023, the Malapascua was on a mission to resupply the BRP Sierra Madre when it was challenged by a vessel of the China Coast Guard which pointed a laser at the Malapascua causing temporary blindness to some of her crew.
