= Whitsun Reef incident =

Diplomatic incident

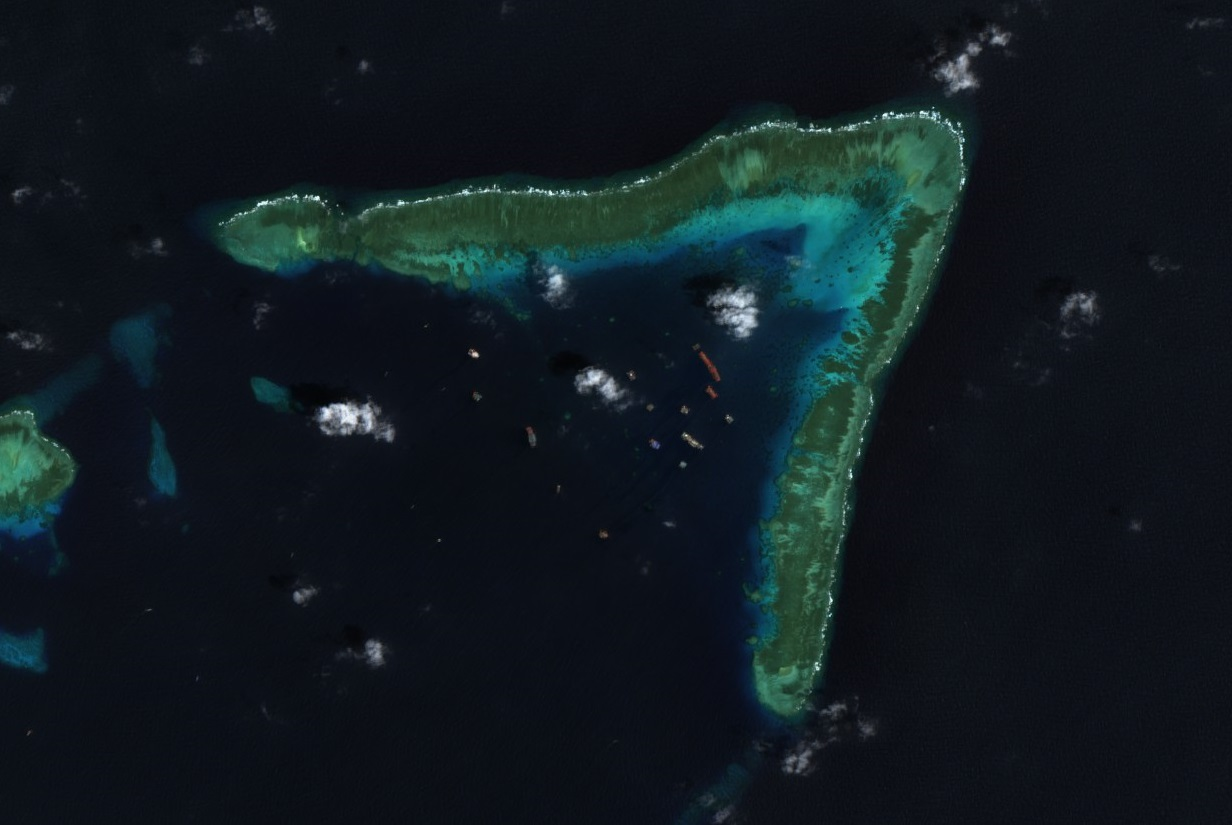
- Marine vessels at Whitsun Reef on March 9, 2021.
- Date: March 21, 2021 (Note: Date the first formal diplomatic protest was filed over the incident. The Chinese vessels which caused the diplomatic tensions were present in the reef as early as March 7, 2021. Diplomatic tensions and presence of ships persisted for an undetermined time period after the date.)
- Location: Whitsun Reef, South China Sea (Note: Chinese presence at Whitsun Reef later dispersed to other maritime features in the Spratly Islands.); 9°59′12.8″N 114°38′52.1″E
- Type: Diplomatic incident
- Cause: South China Sea disputes; Presence of Chinese ships at Whitsun Reef
- Participants: About 220 Chinese fishing boats allegedly to be part of a militia by the Philippines; Government of China, Philippines and Vietnam.

On March 22, 2021, a diplomatic incident started after the Philippines filed a diplomatic protest against China due to the presence of more than 200 Chinese fishing vessels at Whitsun Reef as early as March 7, 2021. The reef is part of the contested Spratly Islands in the South China Sea.

The Chinese presence at Whitsun Reef caused tensions, with the Philippines alleging that the ships are part of a militia and the mooring of the ships at the reef is a prelude to a Chinese takeover of the maritime feature. China denied such allegations, claiming that the ships were seeking shelter at the reef due to rough weather conditions. Both countries claim sovereignty over Whitsun Reef, as does Vietnam which has filed its own protest against Chinese presence in the reef.

Over time, the Chinese presence in the Whitsun Reef declined. However, the ships' dispersal to other parts of the Spratly Islands prolonged diplomatic tensions.

== Background ==
Whitsun Reef is among the maritime features in the Spratly Islands in the South China Sea. The Spratlys are subject to territorial dispute and are in whole or partly claimed by numerous countries, namely Brunei, China, Malaysia, Philippines, Taiwan, and Vietnam. China claims virtually all of the South China Sea as part of its nine-dash line claim, and the Philippines' claim the Spratlys as being within its exclusive economic zone (EEZ). The Philippines calls the part of the South China sea included in its EEZ the "West Philippine Sea".

Whitsun Reef itself, which is the northeasternmost feature of the Union Banks, is claimed by China, Philippines, and Vietnam. Whitsun Reef is called Niu'e Jiao by China and Julian Felipe Reef by the Philippines. In Vietnam, the reef is called Đá Ba Đầu.

Up to 220 marine vessels were monitored to have moored in the Whitsun Reef on March 7, 2021, causing concern that the ships are part of prelude to the Chinese government taking control over the maritime feature. Previous changes of control over maritime features in the South China Sea in favor of China and at expense of the Philippines include the 1995 Mischief Reef takeover and the aftermath of the 2012 standoff in the Scarborough Shoal. The ships are alleged by the Philippine government to be part of China's People’s Armed Forces Maritime Militia, a claim denied by China which says they are normal fishing boats.

President Rodrigo Duterte, who took office in 2016, has pursued closer ties to China and initially did not demand that China comply with the 2016 international arbitration ruling in The Hague which invalidated China's nine-dash line claims beyond those entitled to China under the United Nations Convention on the Law of the Sea. The ruling is unrecognized by China, which calls it a "sham". Duterte's critics believe that Duterte has not done enough to assert the Philippines' claim in the South China Sea and have questioned Duterte's cordial approach to China. Duterte has also sought funding from China for his infrastructure program by fostering ties with China. In 2020, Duterte reaffirmed the 2016 Hague ruling and pledged a stronger stance in the South China Sea dispute.

== Incident ==
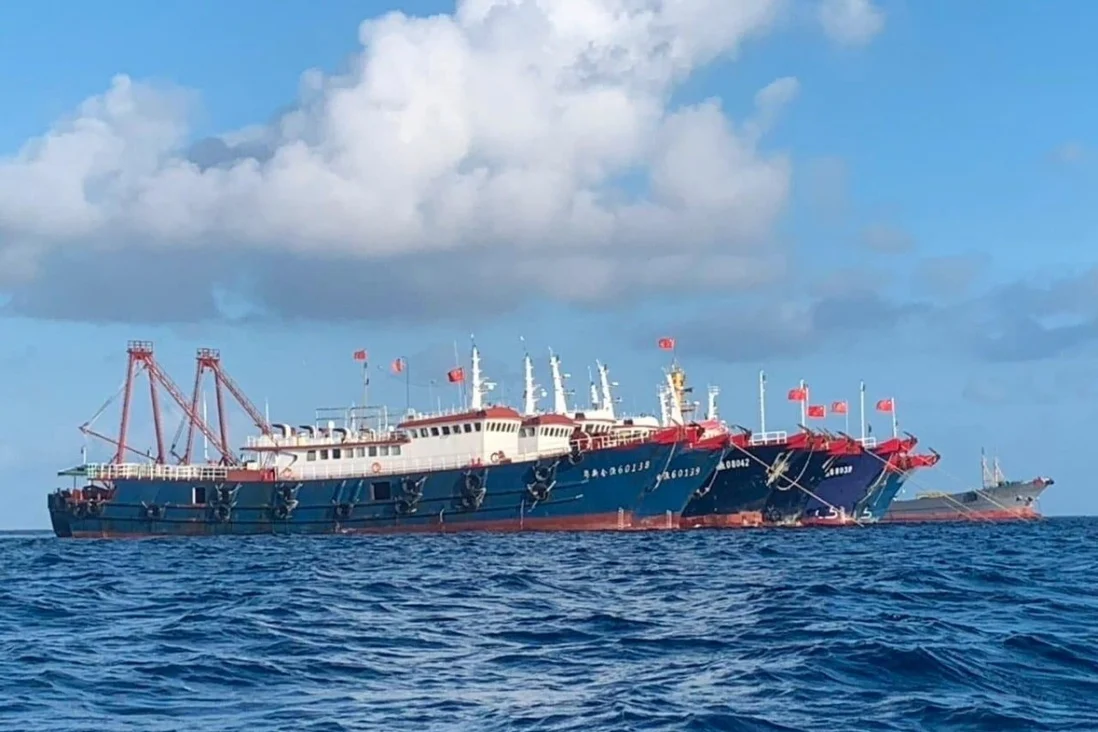
Chinese marine vessels moored at Whitsun Reef

Presence of marine vessels at Whitsun Reef from February 7 to April 3, 2021

=== March ===
The National Task Force for the West Philippine Sea (NTF-WPS), a task force of the Philippine government, received a report that around 220 Chinese fishing ships were monitored to have moored at Whitsun Reef as early as March 7, 2021. The NTF-WPS reported that the Chinese marine vessels were not engaging in fishing activities and noted the clear weather in the vicinity at around that time. The NTF-WPS also took note of the incident due to "possible overfishing and destruction of the marine environment, as well as risks to the safety of navigation". The Chinese vessels were observed to have been lying side by side in formation. The Armed Forces of the Philippines said in response to the NTF-WPS report that its Western Command had sent assets of the Philippine Air Force and Navy to the South China Sea to further validate the report.

On March 21, Philippine Department of National Defense (DFA) Secretary Delfin Lorenzana issued a demand to China to have the marine vessels, which he alleged were part of a maritime militia, withdraw from Whitsun Reef; calling the mooring as an act of incursion. The country's Department of Foreign Affairs also filed its first diplomatic protest against Chinese maritime presence in the reef following recommendation from the Philippine military. The following day, China's Ministry of Foreign Affairs (MFA) disputed the Philippine claim regarding the situation, saying that the fishing boats took shelter at the Whitsun Reef due to rough sea and wind conditions and insisted that their mooring was normal, also saying, "there is no Chinese Maritime Militia as alleged".

Vietnam, also a claimant country of the Whitsun Reef, issued a statement on March 25 objecting to Chinese presence in the reef. A ship of the Vietnam Coast Guard also reportedly moored near the reef.

The Philippine military vowed on March 31 to continue conducting aerial patrols over the South China Sea. The NTF-WPS released a report on the same day that only 44 Chinese marine vessels remain at Whitsun Reef, with other ships dispersing to other parts of the Spratly Islands; 115 ships were observed to have moored near McKennan and Hughes Reefs, 45 ships near Thitu Island (which is the seat of the Philippine-administered Kalayaan municipality), and 50 ships near Mischief, Fiery Cross, and Subi reefs. The NTF-WPS also noted the presence of four Chinese Navy ships at Mischief Reef.

=== April ===
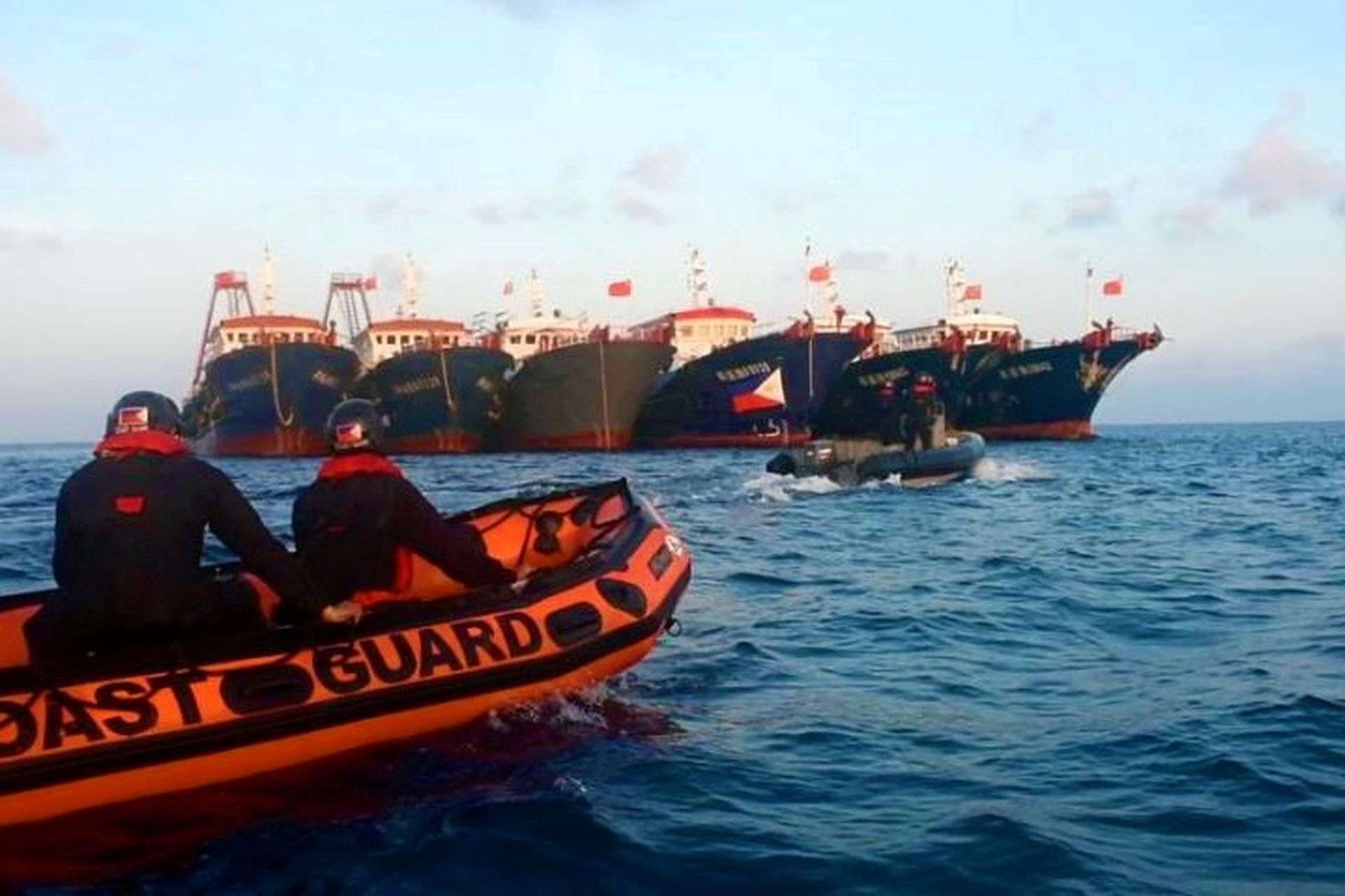
The Philippine Coast Guard as part of its maritime patrol operations approaches Chinese ships moored at Whitsun Reef, April 13, 2021

The Philippine military documented structures which it considers illegal in the Union Banks on April 1, 2021, although it did not directly attribute the structures to China.

Philippine Foreign Affairs Secretary Teodoro Locsin Jr. and Chinese Foreign Minister Wang Yi held talks regarding the Whitsun Reef incident on April 2 in Fujian. The following day Philippine Defense Secretary Delfin Lorenzana repeated calls for China to withdraw ships in the area saying he is "no fool", that there is no good reason for the ships to remain in the area, and remarking that the "weather has been good so far". He cited aerial surveillance results that there were still 44 Chinese vessels moored in the reef at that time. He further remarked that China is planning to occupy more features in the South China Sea. The Chinese Embassy in Manila rebuked Lorenzana's remarks, branding them "perplexing" and "unprofessional".

The Philippines' foreign department supported Lorenzana's remarks on April 5, and pledged to file further diplomatic protests if the Philippines' demand for Chinese ships to withdraw from Whitsun Reef is not met or compliance is delayed. The continued tensions over the Whitsun Reef also elicited remarks from direct aides of President Rodrigo Duterte; his lawyer and former spokesperson Salvador Panelo saying the prolonged Chinese presence in the reef risk "unwanted hostilities that both countries would rather not pursue" and that the Philippines would not be blinded by China's humanitarian aid in reference to China's vaccine donations in response to the COVID-19 pandemic, and spokesperson Harry Roque remarking that the Philippine government won't give up a "single inch" of its territory or EEZ.

The Chinese Foreign Ministry released a statement on April 6 calling for the Philippines to stop "hyping up" the issue and urged the country to preserve peace and stability in the region, while reiterating China's sovereignty over the South China Sea islands. It also maintained that China doesn't intend to maintain a "permanent presence" in the area. In response, Foreign Secretary Locsin repeated the Philippines demand for China to order the ships to withdraw if that was the case, remarked that "Nobody fishes by lashing ships together", and referenced the act to the Persian invasion of Greece. The Philippines filed another diplomatic protest.

As of April 8, bilateral talks over the incident are still taking place despite the repeated hostile public verbal exchanges. The Philippine side maintains it is weighing numerous options to resolve the crisis, including leveraging its partnerships with other countries such as the United States, and expelling a Chinese diplomat. Vietnam's foreign ministry also released a statement that it is monitoring the situation at Whitsun Reef. On the same day, ABS-CBN reporters on board a ship near the Second Thomas Shoal were confronted by the Chinese Navy. The following day, Foreign Secretary Locsin and US Secretary of State Antony Blinken had talks over the phone over various issues including the Chinese presence at Whitsun Reef.

Foreign Secretary Locsin summoned Huang Xilian, the Chinese ambassador to the Philippines on April 13. In the meeting, Locsin made his stance of objecting to China's "illegal lingering presence" in the reef known. As of that date the NTF-WPS reports that while 9 Chinese ships remained at Whitsun Reef itself, around 231 other Chinese vessels were spotted in other maritime features of the Spratly Islands. The Philippines filed another diplomatic protest the following day.

President Rodrigo Duterte remarked on April 19, that he does not care about the issue of fishing rights in the South China Sea but added that he is prepared to send naval ships in the area if China begins drilling for oil and other mineral resources.

On April 21, two more protests were filed over what the Philippines says as China's "blatant disregard" of its prior commitment to "promote peace and stability in the region" due to the presence of around 160 Chinese ships within the Philippines' claimed exclusive economic zone in the South China Sea.

=== Later months ===
By mid-May 2021, there were only 9 vessels in the Union Banks. However the number of ships in the Union Banks increased again to 236 in mid-June 2021. By May 28, 2021, the Philippines' foreign department has filed its 100th diplomatic protest over Chinese presence within the country's claim exclusive economic zone in the South China Sea.

== Reactions ==
=== Domestic ===
==== In China ====
Chinese news publication Global Times released an editorial which asserts that China would make a "strong response" if China was made to withdraw its ships at Whitsun Reef. It also says that the United States has a "geopolitical need" to use the Philippines to create tensions in the South China Sea.

==== In the Philippines ====
The Philippine Chamber of Commerce and Industry, Management Association of the Philippines, Makati Business Club, Filipina CEO Circle, Bishops-Businessmen's Conference for Human Development, Judicial Reform Initiative, Cebu Business Club, and Iloilo Business Club issued a joint statement of support calling for China to withdraw the presence of its ships from Whitsun Reef and supporting the Philippine sovereignty claims over the maritime feature.

=== International ===
Australia, Japan, and the United States expressed concerns over the development in the South China Sea in response to the standoff in Whitsun Reef. The United States on April 7, 2021, warned China not to use military action against the Philippines, remarking that "an armed attack against the Philippines' armed forces, public vessels, or aircraft in the Pacific, including in the South China Sea" would trigger its obligation under its Mutual Defense Treaty with the Philippines.
