= August 2023 Second Thomas Shoal standoff =

China used water cannons to block Philippine resupply boats at Second Thomas Shoal

- Part of South China Sea disputes
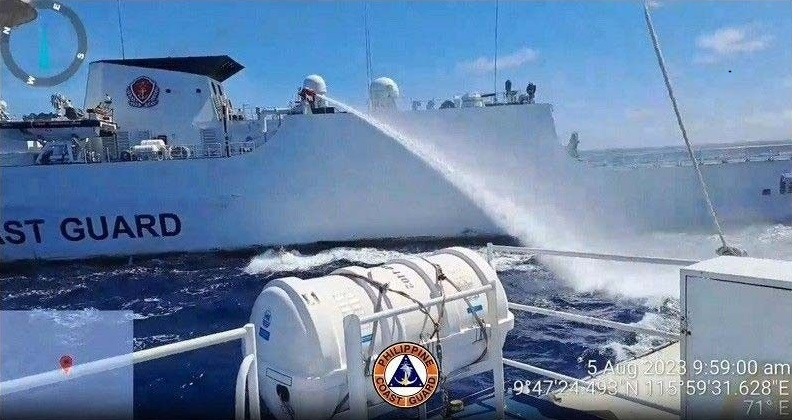
- Haijing 5305 fires a water cannon at BRP Malabrigo
Date	5 August 2023
Location	Near Second Thomas Shoal, Spratly Islands, South China Sea

Belligerents
Philippines	China

Units involved
Philippine Coast Guard: BRP Gabriela Silang (OPV-8301); BRP Teresa Magbanua (MRRV-9701); BRP Malabrigo; BRP Cabra; Philippine Navy: Unaizah May 1; Unaizah May 2	China Coast Guard: Chuanshan (3302); Haijing 4203; Haijing 5201; "Zhubi" (5304); Haijing 5305; Haijing 5402

Strength
4 patrol vessels 2 wooden supply boats	6 cutters

On August 5, 2023, a China Coast Guard ship blocked a Philippine Coast Guard ship en route to the Philippine-occupied Second Thomas Shoal in the disputed Spratly Islands.

== Background ==
The Second Thomas Shoal (named Ren'ai Jiao (仁爱礁) by China; Ayungin Shoal by the Philippines) is part of the Spratly Islands which is disputed territory claimed in full or in part by multiple countries including China and the Philippines in the South China Sea. The sea itself is claimed by China under its nine-dash map line claim.

Second Thomas Shoal is occupied by the Philippines, which intentionally grounded the Philippine Navy ship BRP Sierra Madre on the shoal in 1999.

== Incident ==
Philippine Coast Guard (PCG) video showing a China Coast Guard ship firing its water cannon towards a PCG ship

On August 5, 2023, the Philippine Coast Guard and the Philippine Navy were heading to the Second Thomas Shoal to conduct what it describes as a routine resupply mission for personnel aboard the BRP Sierra Madre marooned at the feature. The mission involved two wooden boats of the Philippine Navy; Unaizah May 1 (UM1) and Unaizah May 2 escorted by the Coast Guard's BRP Malabrigo and BRP Cabra while BRP Gabriela Silang and BRP Teresa Magbanua was in standby near at the shoal. Navy purposely uses civilian-type ships for the resupply as part of grey-zone warfare.

The China Coast Guard (CCG) has impended the Philippine ships. UM1 was able to provide provisions for Filipino personnel aboard Sierra Madre after successfully outmaneuvering a CCG ship. UM2 was deterred by another CCG ship which fired water cannons towards it. The CCG were allegedly backed by Chinese maritime militia vessels.

China claims that the Philippines is sending construction materials to reinforce Sierra Madre, an activity which it considers as illegal.

=== Chinese order of battle ===
- China Coast Guard
  - South Sea Bureau
    - 3rd Bureau
      - Chuanshan / 川山 (3302)
    - 4th Bureau
      - Haijing 4203 / 海警 4203
    - 5th Bureau
      - Haijing 5201 / 海警 5201
      - Zhubi / 渚碧 (5304)
      - Haijing 5305 /海警 5305
      - Haijing 5402 / 海警 5402

== Reactions ==
=== China Foreign Ministry ===
Chinese Foreign Minister Wang Yi urged the Philippines to work with China to resolve the South China Sea dispute in response to the Second Thomas Shoal incident. The Chinese foreign ministry has also tried to dissuade the United States from interfering in the territorial dispute.

=== International ===
The United States reaffirmed its commitment to its alliance with the Philippines in response to the incident. Australia, Canada, France, Germany, Japan, the United Kingdom and the European Union also issued statements condemning China.

== Aftermath ==
=== Claims against Filipino diplomats ===
The Department of Foreign Affairs supposedly issued a memorandum ordering the recall of Jose Manuel Romualdez, Ambassador of the Philippines to the United States due to bribery and corruption allegations from an anonymous complaint. Foreign Secretary Enrique Manalo denied such order exists and Romualdez claimed that China is launching a smear campaign to damage Philippine–United States relations.

=== Alleged Philippine promise ===
On August 8, 2023, China brought up an alleged explicit promise made by the Philippines to remove Sierra Madre from the Second Thomas Shoal.

The Department of Foreign Affairs (DFA) of the Philippines insists that the grounded ship shall remain a "permanent station". On August 9, President Bongbong Marcos issued a statement that he is "not aware of any such arrangement or agreement" while adding that if such exist, that he rescind such agreement.

In response to request to show proof of such agreement, China said that there is no point in doing so following the rescission.

On August 14, 2023, Manila Times columnist Rigoberto Tiglao claimed that the alleged pledge was indeed made albeit "solely verbal". Tiglao wrote that such pledge was referenced in several documents including confidential official memoranda from the DFA.

Senators Jinggoy Estrada and JV Ejercito said that there was no such deal made during the administration of their father Joseph Estrada. The former had prior recent correspondence with Orly Mercado who was the Defense Secretary during the Estrada presidency. He also pointed out that the promise is "illogical" given that President Estrada himself instructed the Armed Forces of the Philippines to ground Sierra Madre as a move for the Philippines to assert its claim over the feature. He challenged China to name the specific Filipino official who made the supposed pledge.

Former President Gloria Macapagal Arroyo also categorically denied making any such promise during her administration.

The National Security Council claim that China is using "political operators" to undermine the Philippines' position on the South China Sea dispute, naming the alleged promise as one of China's methods of "psychological warfare" to sway Filipino public opinion on the matter.

In April 2024, Philippine president Bongbong Marcos said he was convinced that former president Rodrigo Duterte had made a secret deal with China. Duterte admitted on April 11 that he had made a "status quo" "gentleman’s agreement" not to repair or reinforce BRP Sierra Madre. Food and water were allowed to be brought to the sailors, but construction materials would not be permitted.

=== Vietnam ===
Three Filipino critics on China's territorial claims were offered compensation by unidentified individuals in July to comment on Vietnam's alleged militarization of the South China Sea. The three were Jay Batongbacal (UP Institute of Maritime Affairs and the Law of the Sea head), Antonio Carpio (Retired Supreme Court Justice), and Renato De Castro (De La Salle University international studies professor). Carpio said this was meant to "direct the Filipinos’ ire on Vietnam and away from China". Other media outlets were approached to write about Vietnam's island-building activities.

== See also ==
- Second Thomas Shoal laser incident
