= Second Thomas Shoal =

Atoll in the South China Sea

Disputed atoll
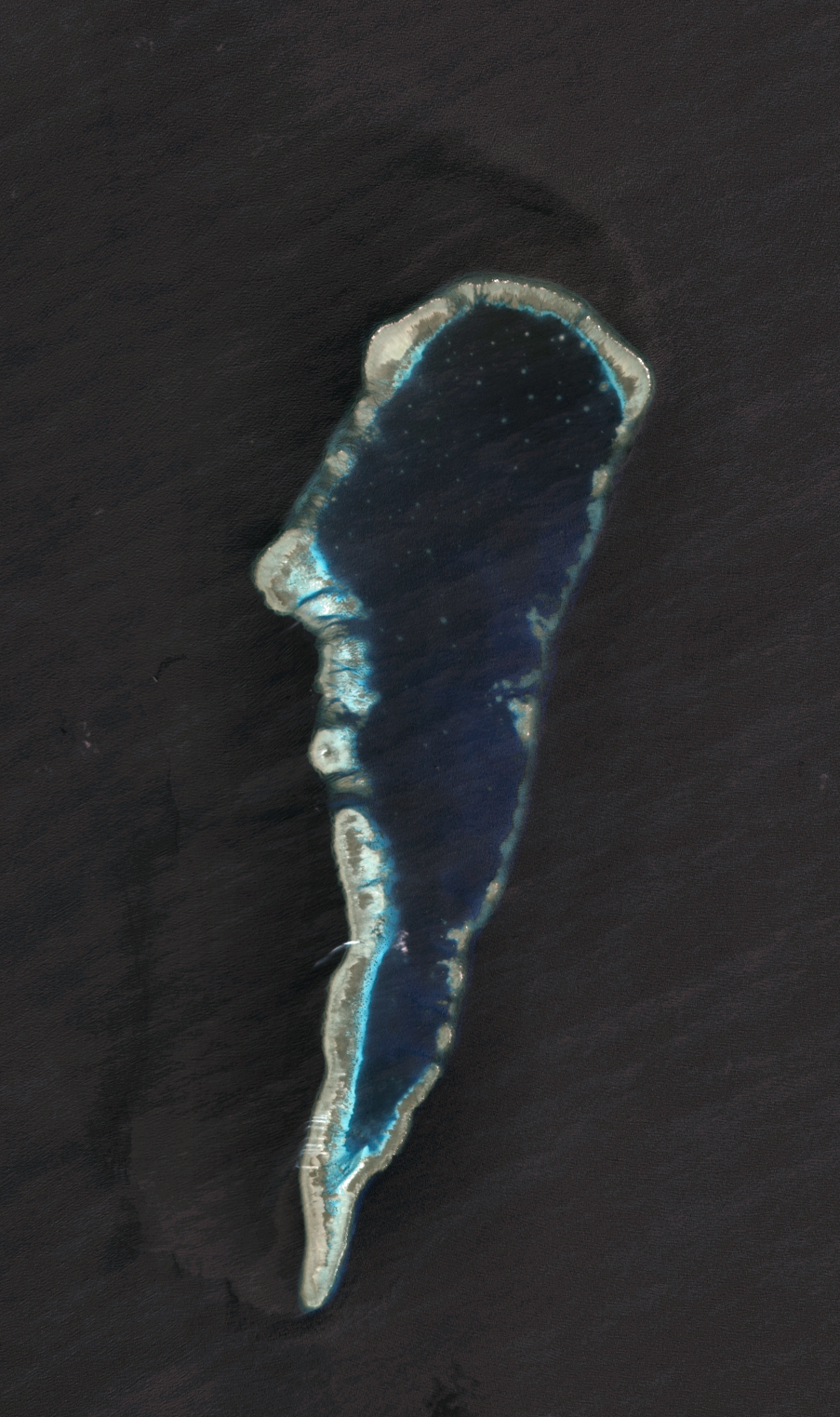
- Second Thomas Shoal

- Location within Spratly Islands
- Other names: Ayungin Shoal (Philippine English); Bãi Cỏ Mây (Vietnamese); Buhanginan ng Ayungin (Filipino); Rén'ài Jiāo 仁爱礁/仁愛礁 (Chinese)

Geography
- Location: South China Sea
- Coordinates: 9°44′N 115°52′E
- Archipelago: Spratly Islands

Administration
- Philippines
- Region: Southwestern Tagalog Region
- Province: Palawan
- Municipality: Kalayaan

Claimed by
- China
- Philippines
- Taiwan
- Vietnam

Second Thomas Shoal, also known as Ayungin Shoal (Filipino: Buhanginan ng Ayungin, lit. 'sandbank of silver perch'), Bãi Cỏ Mây (Vietnamese) and Rén'ài Jiāo (Chinese: 仁爱礁/仁愛礁), is a submerged reef in the Spratly Islands of the South China Sea, 105 nautical miles (194 km; 121 mi) west of Palawan, Philippines. It is a disputed territory and claimed by multiple nations.

The reef is occupied by a garrison of Philippine Navy personnel aboard a ship, the BRP Sierra Madre, that was intentionally grounded on the reef in 1999 and has been periodically replenished since then.

== History ==
The atoll is one of three named after Thomas Gilbert, captain of the Charlotte:

- First Thomas Shoal – 09°19′N 115°56′E, South of Second Thomas Shoal.
- Second Thomas Shoal – 09°44′N 115°52′E, Southeast of Mischief Reef.
- Third Thomas Shoal – 10°54′N 115°56′E, Northeast of Flat Island – some distance North of Second Thomas Shoal.

== Geographical location ==
Located south-east of Mischief Reef (09°55′N 115°32′E), Second Thomas Shoal is near the centre of Dangerous Ground in the north-eastern part of the Spratly Islands. There are no settlements north or east of it. It is a tear-drop shaped atoll, 11 nautical miles (20 km; 13 mi) long, from north to south and fringed with coral reefs. The coral rim surrounds a lagoon, which has depths of up to 27 metres (89 ft) and is accessible to small boats from the east. Drying reef patches are found east and west of the reef rim.

== Geographical features ==
On July 12, 2016, the UNCLOS tribunal at the Permanent Court of Arbitration concluded that Second Thomas Shoal is, or in its natural condition was, exposed at low tide and submerged at high tide and, accordingly, has low-tide elevations that do not generate an entitlement to a territorial sea, exclusive economic zone or continental shelf.

== Territorial claims ==
Second Thomas Shoal is claimed by China, the Philippines, Taiwan and Vietnam.

The Philippine Navy maintains a presence of less than a dozen Marine personnel on a 100 m (330 ft) long Second World War US-built Philippine Navy landing craft, the BRP Sierra Madre, which was deliberately run aground at the atoll in 1999, in response to the Chinese reclamation of Mischief Reef. The Philippines claims that the atoll is part of its continental shelf. Parts of the Spratly group of islands, where Second Thomas Shoal lies, are claimed by China, Brunei, the Philippines, Malaysia and Vietnam.

=== Standoffs ===
In response to China's occupation of Mischief Reef in 1994, Philippine president Joseph Estrada in 1998 decided to "as well put up our own structures". In May 1999, two Philippine ships—the BRP Sierra Madre and the BRP Lanao del Norte—were intentionally grounded on the shoal. According to Chinese officials' narrative, the Philippines partly complied with China's demand to remove the ships, towing away the BRP Lanao del Norte but leaving the BRP Sierra Madre on the shoal. Estrada promised that the latter vessel would also be towed away. However, the BRP Sierra Madre served as an informal outpost of the Philippine Navy until 2014, when the Philippines declared it a "permanent installation"; in response, the Chinese government asked the Philippines to remove the grounded ship.

Philippine supply ships have avoided Chinese blockades in order to deliver food, water and other supplies to the BRP Sierra Madre garrison. PRC coast guard vessels blocked two attempts by Philippine ships to resupply the garrison on March 9, 2014, thus supplies were airdropped to it three days later. Another supply ship with replacement troops successfully reached the atoll on March 29, 2014, by sailing through shallow waters where the PRC vessels, having deeper drafts, were unable to follow. Since then, the Philippine military has been sending relief and provisions by supply boats.

In 2017, the Philippines under President Rodrigo Duterte accepted a gentlemen's agreement with China to maintain the status quo for the South China Sea while both sides tried to strengthen their relations. Under the status quo agreement, no construction materials would be allowed to fortify the Sierra Madre to avoid escalations. In 2023, Philippine president Bongbong Marcos said, "I am not aware of such agreement. If there was, I rescind it as of this moment". A year later, Marcos said he was "horrified" by revelations about the said "gentlemen's agreement".

In November 2021 and August 2023, China Coast Guard (CCG) vessels used water cannons and blocked Philippine supply boats, preventing the boats from delivering essential supplies to the Philippine marines stationed on the Sierra Madre. On October 22, 2023, Philippine officials disclosed that Chinese vessels had rammed a Philippine Coast Guard ship and a military-run supply boat on October 17, during a replenishment mission to the Sierra Madre. Earlier in the same year, a PRC coast guard ship intercepted a Philippine coast guard ship en route to the Sierra Madre and beamed a green laser light at the latter, which light the Philippine side alleged was "military grade" and caused its crew to suffer from temporary blindness. The incident, which China denied, led to the Philippines' filing of a diplomatic protest.

In April 2024, China stated it reached an agreement with the Philippines in adopting a "new model" over the disputed atoll; the claim, however, was denied by Philippine defense secretary Gilberto Teodoro, who said that the Philippines would not enter into any agreements compromising its territorial claims. In June, China's coast guard interfered with a new supply mission to the Sierra Madre by the Philippine Navy. A month later, a "provisional agreement" on supply missions had been reached between China and the Philippines as part of efforts to de-escalate tensions, with the details kept secret. On August 20, the day after a clash between the two coast guards occurred near the Sabina Shoal, the Philippine government stated it was considering expanding the provisional agreement covering the Second Thomas Shoal to other areas.

In 2026, the Philippines accused China of using cyanide around the atoll.

== Alternate names ==
The Singapore National University Gazetteer, and the US NGA Gazetteer list the following as other names for the Second Thomas Shoal:

- Filipino – Ayungin
- French – Banc Thomas Deuxième
- Mandarin Chinese – Ren'ai Jiao
- Other Chinese names – Jen-ai An-sha, Jen-ai Chiao, Jên-ai Chiao, Ren'ai Ansha, 仁愛暗沙, 仁爱礁, 断节
- Other English names – Thomas Shoal Second
- Other names – Duanjie
- Vietnamese – Bãi Cỏ Mây
