= Mutual Defense Treaty (United States–Philippines) =

Defense treaty

Mutual Defense Treaty between the Republic of the Philippines and the United States of America
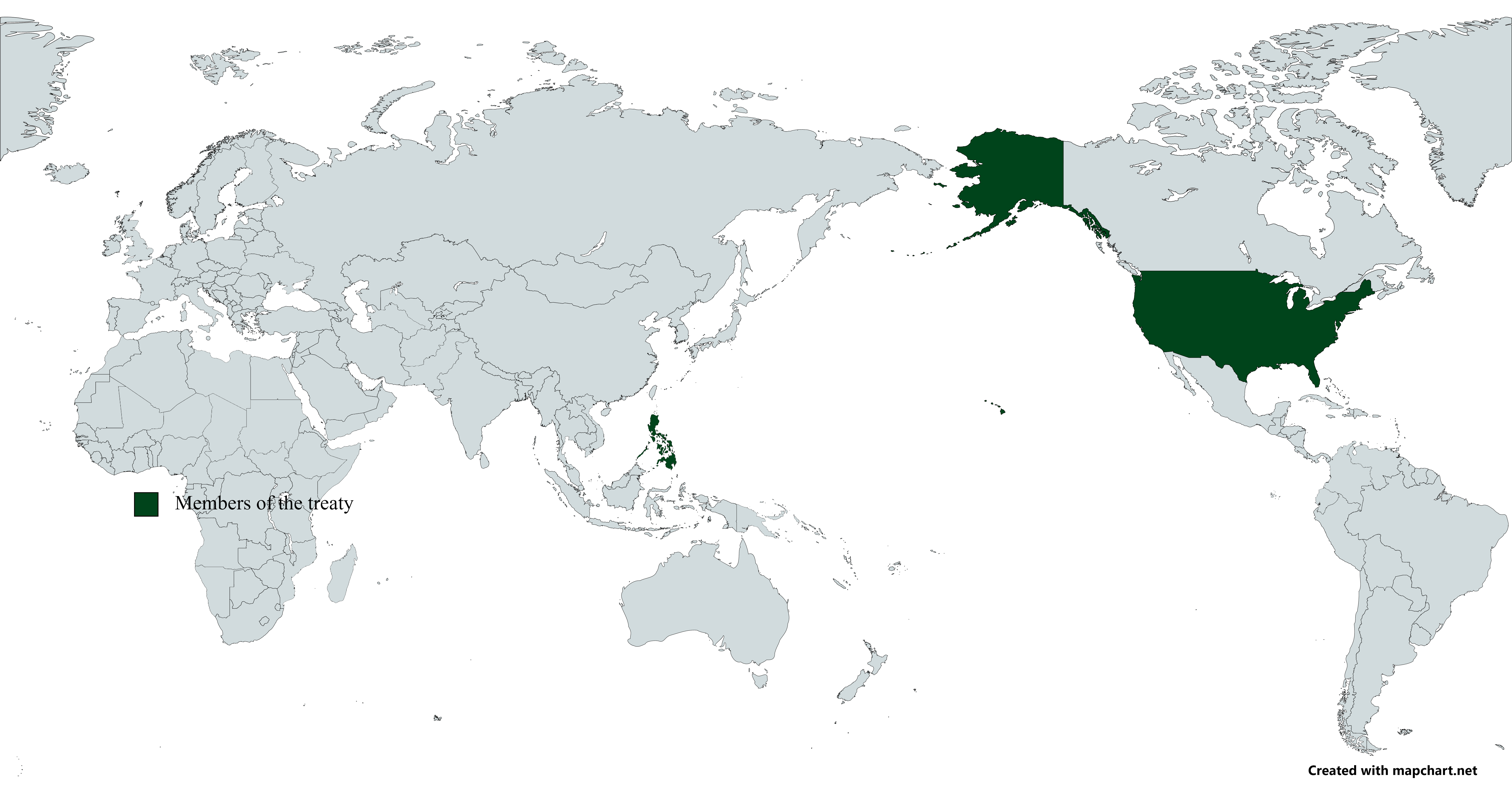
- Map of the Members of the treaty
- Type: Military alliance
- Signed: August 30, 1951
- Location: Washington D.C., United States
- Parties: Philippines; United States
- Language: English

The Mutual Defense Treaty Between the United States and the Republic of the Philippines is an agreement between the two nations recognizing that an attack in the Pacific on either would endanger the peace of both and agreeing to act in concert to meet the common danger. It was signed on August 30, 1951 by their representatives in Washington, D.C. and has eight articles.

== History ==
The Philippines became a US territory after the Spanish–American War and the subsequent Philippine–American War. In 1935, under the terms of the Tydings–McDuffie Act, the Philippines became a self-governing commonwealth, the Philippine Commonwealth, with full independence planned for ten years later. Delayed by World War II and the Japanese invasion and occupation of the Philippines, the Philippines became a fully independent sovereign state on July 4, 1946. Following independence, a strong US military presence remained, including a number of US military bases that were agreed in treaties between the countries. Some treaties created a strong bond between them that gave both countries rights not enjoyed by other nations. The Mutual Defense Treaty between the Republic of the Philippines and the United States of America was signed on August 30, 1951, in Washington, D.C. between representatives of the Philippines and the United States.

Philippine Defense Secretary Delfin Lorenzana ordered a review of the MDT on December 28, 2018, to "maintain it, strengthen it, or scrap it". On February 11, 2020, the Philippines notified the US that it would withdraw from the Visiting Forces Agreement, leading to speculation that the move could impact the MDT. It reversed its decision in June 2020.

In 2021, after the Philippines filed a diplomatic protest over a new Chinese law that may endanger Filipino fishers, US Secretary of State Antony Blinken reaffirmed the US commitment to the MDT. In a 2022 meeting, US Vice President Kamala Harris reportedly assured Philippine president Bongbong Marcos that "an armed attack on the Philippines armed forces, public vessels, or aircraft in the South China Sea would invoke US Mutual Defense commitments."

In September 2024, the United States Secretary of defense Lloyd Austin III reaffirmed its "ironclad" commitment to defending the Philippines after China's latest effort to assert its naval presence in the South China Sea.

In October 2024, The Philippine Navy and the United States Navy conducted joint anti-submarine and night patrol exercises as part of their Sama-Sama ("together" in Filipino) military drills. The exercises are designed to enhance the interoperability of the two navies and improve their readiness in maritime security operations. Japan, Australia, Canada, and France will join the exercises.

These naval maneuvers come amid heightened tensions due to the increasing presence of Chinese vessels, including warships, in the West Philippine Sea, part of the contested South China Sea. The drills are seen as a strategic response to rising security concerns in the region.

On November 4, 2024, Philippine Ambassador to the United States, Jose Manuel Romualdez, confirmed that the treaty compelling the United States to defend the Philippines in case of an armed attack would remain unchanged, irrespective of the outcome of the 2024 U.S. presidential elections. The agreement obligates both nations to come to each other's defense in the event of an external armed attack, reaffirming the longstanding military alliance between the two countries.

In December 2024 The United States deployed A-10 Thunderbolt II aircraft to the Philippines for joint training exercises with the Philippine Air Force, reinforcing their defense partnership.

== Specifics ==
The overall accord contains eight articles and dictates that both nations would support each other if either the Philippines or the United States were to be attacked by an external party.

As stated in Article I of the treaty, each party is to settle international disputes in a peaceful manner so that international peace is not threatened, and to refrain from the threat of the use of force in any manner that is inconsistent with the purpose of the United Nations. Article II states that each party either separately or jointly through mutual aid may acquire, develop and maintain their capacity to resist armed attack. Article III states that from time to time the parties will consult one another through the use of their secretaries of state, foreign ministers or consuls in order to determine the appropriate measures of implementation. The parties will also consult one another when either party determines that their territorial integrity, political independence or national security is threatened by armed attack in the Pacific. Article IV states that an attack on either party will be acted upon in accordance with their constitutional processes and that any armed attack on either party will be brought to the attention of the United Nations for immediate action. Once the United Nations has issued such orders, all hostile actions between the signatories of this treaty and opposing parties will be terminated.

Article V defines the meaning of attack and its purpose which includes all attacks by a hostile power will be held as an attack on a metropolitan area by both parties or on the island territories under its jurisdiction in the Pacific or on its armed forces, public vessels or aircraft in the Pacific. Article VI states that this treaty does not affect, impede, or shall not be interpreted as affecting the rights and obligations of the parties under the Charter of the United Nations. Article VII states that the treaty shall be ratified in accordance with the constitutional processes set delineated by the Constitution of the United States and the Constitution of the Philippines. Lastly, Article VIII stipulates that the treaty terms are indefinite until one or both parties wish to terminate the agreement. If the agreement is to be terminated, either party must give one-year advance notice.

== Support ==
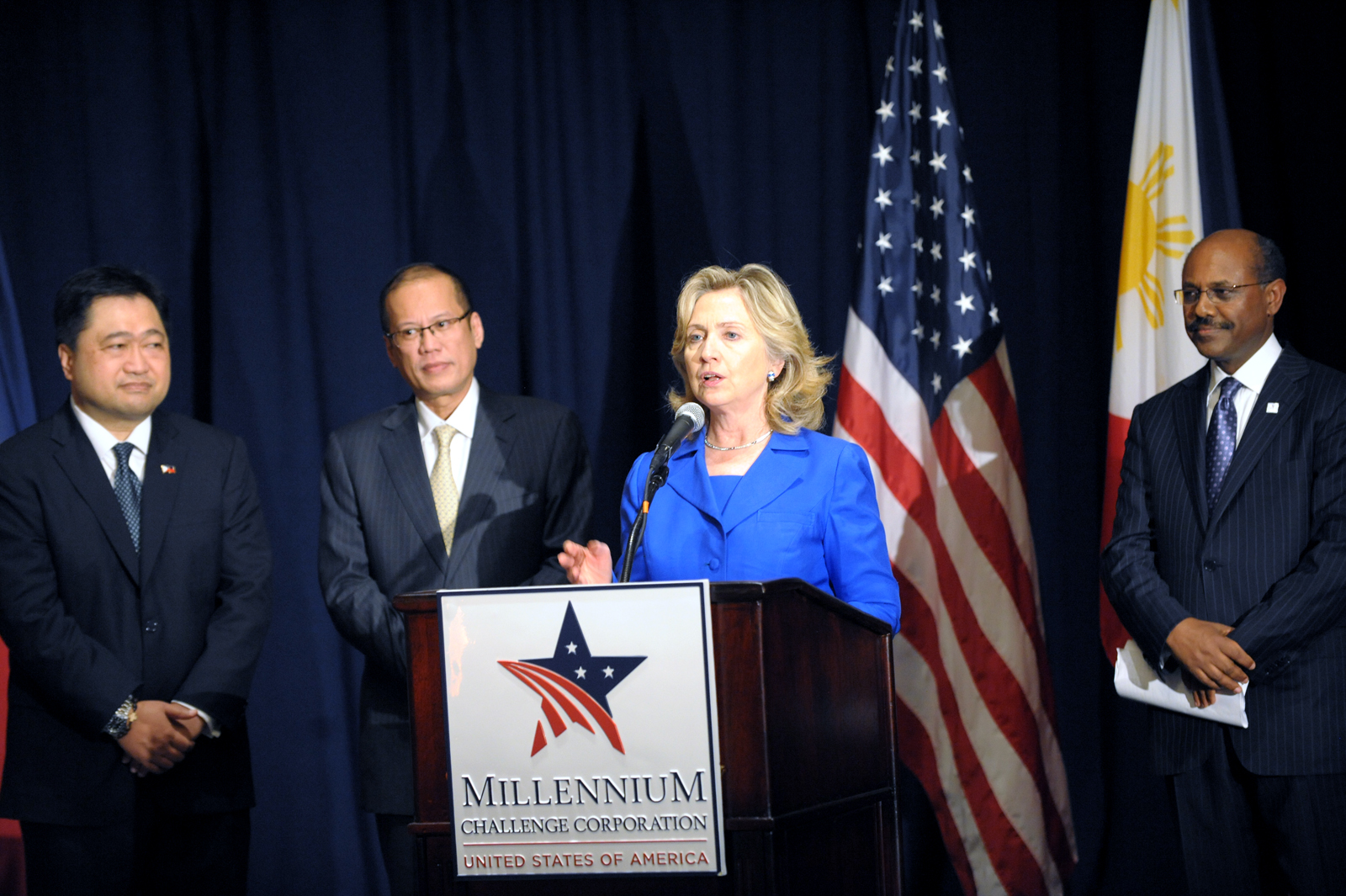
Secretary of State Hillary Clinton featured with Philippine President Benigno Aquino (left) taken while Secretary Clinton was speaking during her two-day visit to the Philippines as a part of President Obama's Partnership for Growth agreement which coincided with the 60th anniversary of the two nations Mutual Defense Treaty, November 17, 2011.

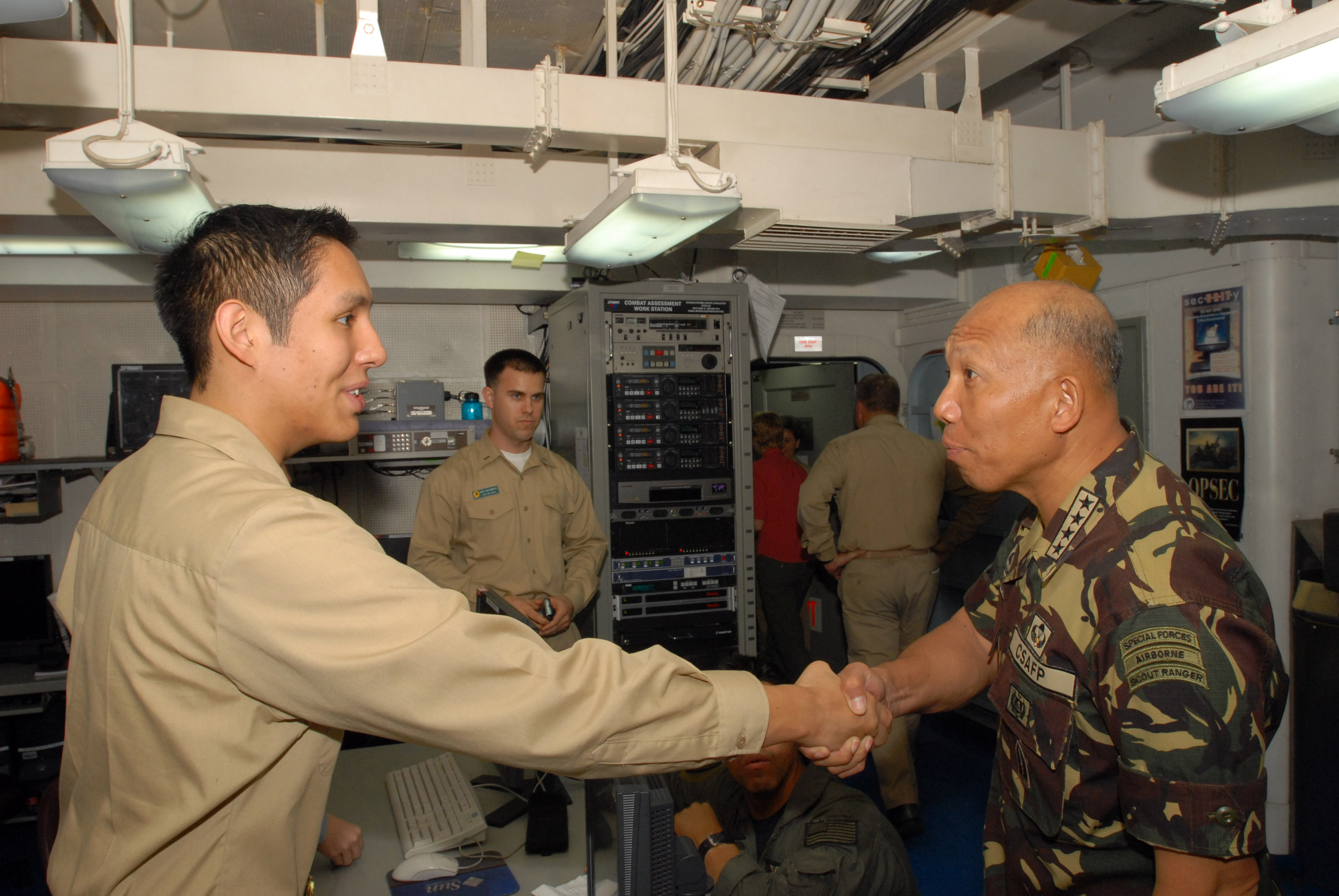
General Alexander B. Yano, Chief of Staff of the Armed Forces of the Philippines shakes hands with Lieutenant Junior-Grade Eduardo Vargas on the USS Ronald Reagan.

After the Soviet Union dissolved and communism declined in the 1990s, bilateral support for the treaty has varied, especially in the Philippines. Generally, the Philippine government has remained supportive of the treaty since its inception, often coming to rely on the US for its defenses as it has done since World War II. This was made apparent during the Cold War by the numerous active US military bases in the Philippines. The most controversial of these bases is Clark Air Base outside of metro Angeles City, and the US Naval Base Subic Bay. The bases were garrisoned for nearly 40 years after the end of World War II until the early 1990s. In 1991, anti-US sentiment in the Philippines forced the Philippine Senate to reject a new base agreement treaty that subsequently forced all US forces to be removed from the Philippines. However, with the rise of global terrorism with the 9/11 attacks and the subsequent economic rise and militant expansion of China, the US strengthened its ties to the Philippines and its other Asian allies.

In its 60th anniversary year, in a ceremony held on November 11, 2011, on the deck of the US-guided missile destroyer USS Fitzgerald docked in Manila, the two governments reaffirmed the treaty with the Manila Declaration. The declaration was signed by Philippine Foreign Secretary Alberto Del Rosario and US Secretary of State Hillary Clinton. The declaration was a formal affirmation of defensive ties between the two countries that date back over a century. The declaration states, in part:

The Republic of the Philippines and the United States reaffirm our shared obligations under the Mutual Defense Treaty. We expect to maintain a robust, balanced, and responsive security partnership including cooperating to enhance the defense, interdiction, and apprehension capabilities of the Armed Forces of the Philippines. The Republic of the Philippines and the United States of America today commemorate the 60th anniversary of the Philippines-US Mutual Defense Treaty. On this historic occasion, we reflect on the rich history of our alliance and the continuing relevance of the treaty for peace, security, and prosperity in the Asia-Pacific region. We also reaffirm the treaty as the foundation of our relationship for the next 60 years and beyond. The United States and the Philippines are bound by a deep and abiding friendship forged by a history of shared sacrifice and common purpose. The many Filipinos who bravely served side-by-side with American servicemen and women during World War II and the veterans of our two nations buried at the Manila American Cemetery in Fort Bonifacio bear testament to our profound and enduring bonds. These bonds are enriched by the presence in the US of over four million Filipinos and Filipino Americans, and in the Philippines by over 150,000 Americans, who help shape the political and economic future of both countries.

In a follow-up to the signing of the Manila Declaration, the US and Philippine representatives met in 2011 to sign onto a new partnership strengthening the economic and defensive ties of the two countries. This new formal agreement was termed Partnership for Growth. This agreement came as a part of President Obama's Global development initiative, which was designed to strengthen the Philippines business development and commercial ties between the two countries. During the signing ceremony of this agreement, Secretary Clinton reaffirmed the US position on the mutual defense of the Philippines through the statement "The US will always be in the corner of the Philippines. We will always stand and fight with you to achieve the future we seek". By 2017, this had evolved into Partnership for Growth with Equity, in line with the 2017-2022 Philippine Development Plan.

== Opposition ==
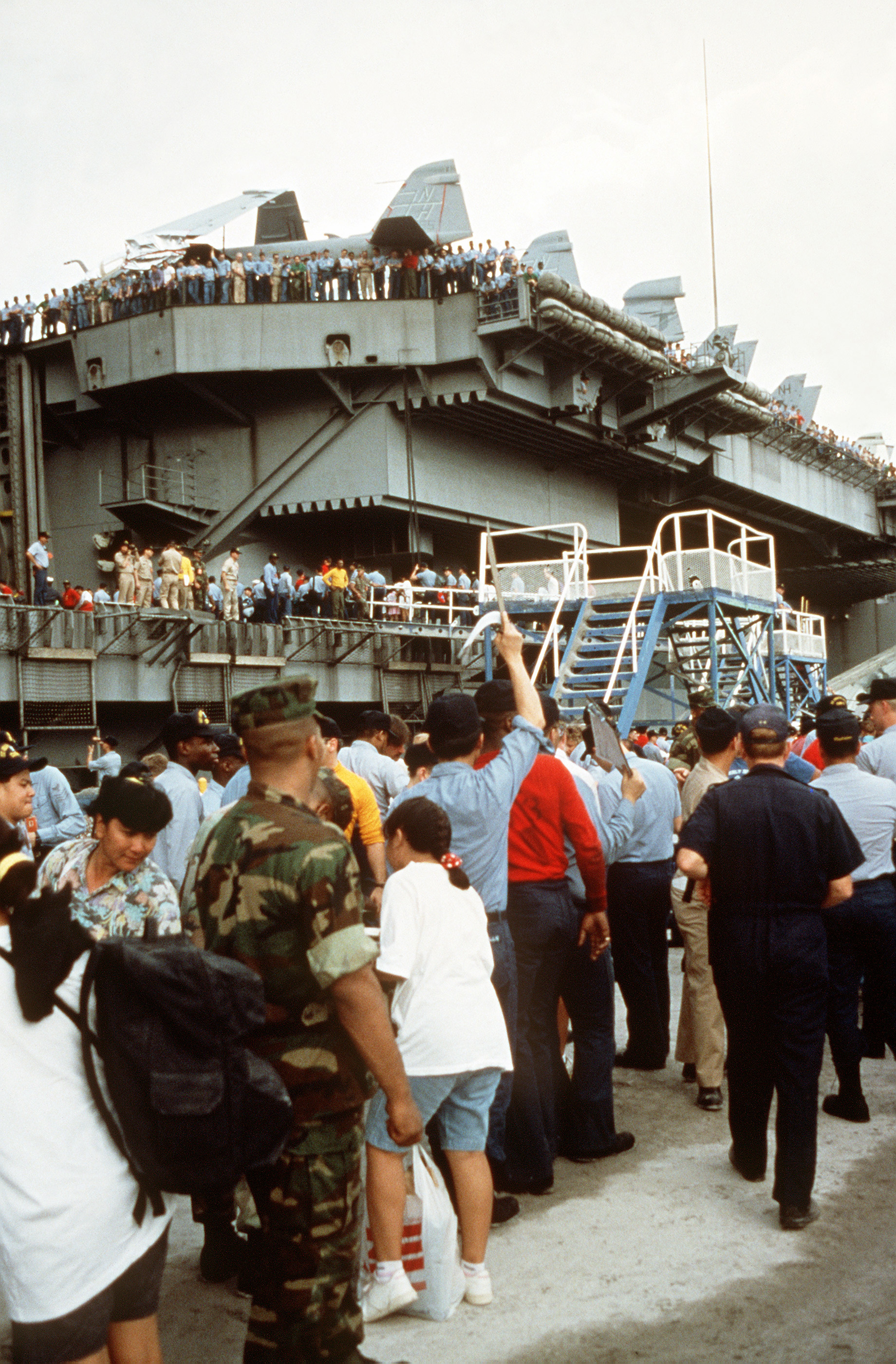
Evacuees board the USS Abraham Lincoln

Opposition to the treaty has had its periods on both sides of the Pacific. The longevity of the US military presence in the Philippines caused opposition to the treaty to begin in the 1980s, with the escalating tensions surrounding US policy and its repercussions. The late 1970s and the 1980s saw a rise in anti-American sentiment following the increasing allegations and perpetrations of US military personnel misconduct towards Filipino men and women. The nightclubs and social hotspots surrounding Clark Air Force Base and Naval Base Subic Bay became flashpoints of allegations of assaults by American service members on local Filipinos. Political tensions steadily grew.

In 1991, the Military Bases Agreement of 1947 was expiring and the George H. W. Bush administration in the US and the Corazon Aquino administration in the Philippines were in talks to renew the agreement. A new treaty, the RP-US Treaty of Friendship, Cooperation, and Security, was signed for the renewal of the Subic Bay lease. Anti-American sentiment continued to grow in the Philippines and was reflected in the election of a Philippine Senate majority against the treaty's renewal. On September 13, 1991, the Philippine Senate voted not to ratify the new treaty. As a result, the last US military personnel in the Philippines were removed from the bases on November 24, 1992.

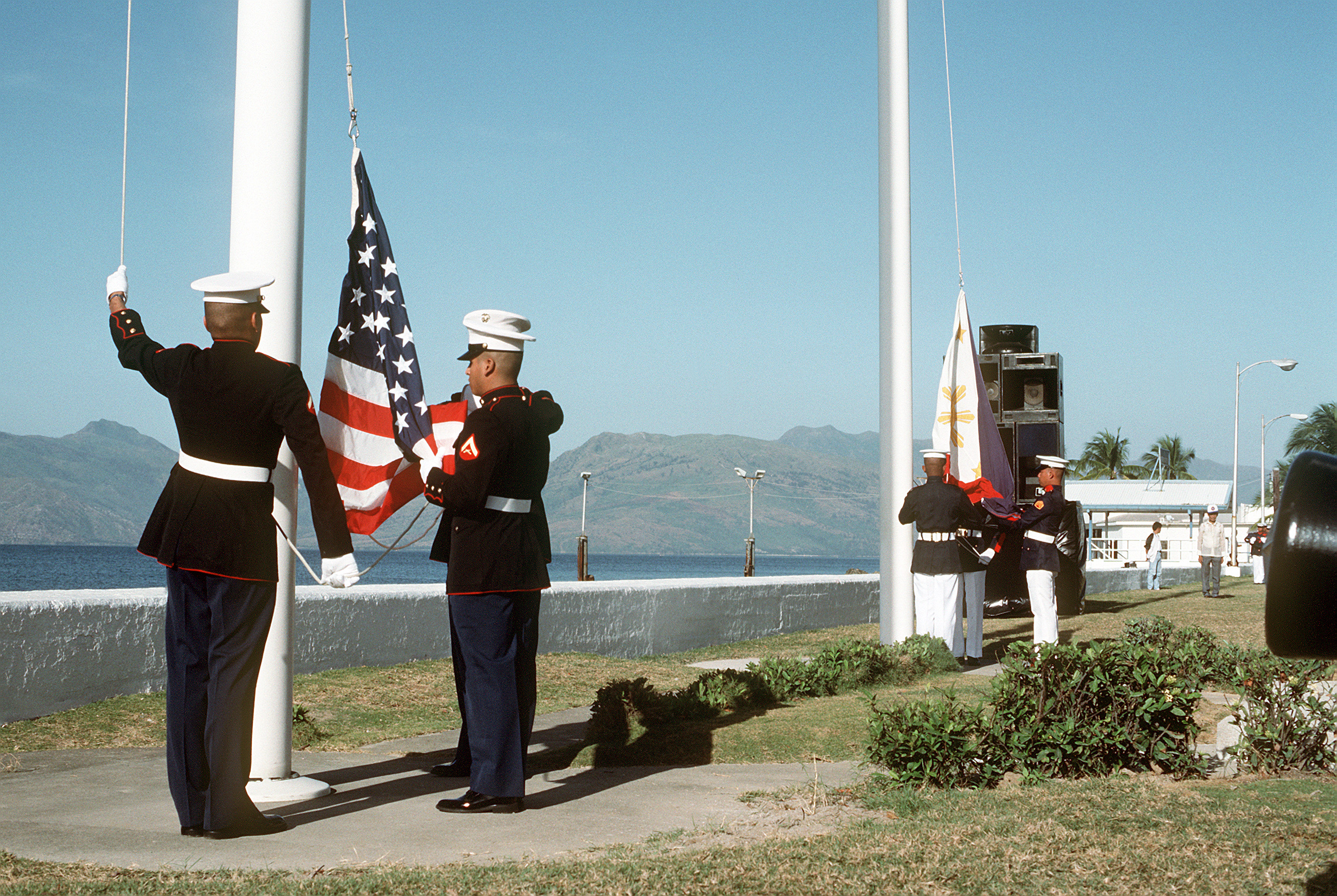
The U.S. flag is lowered by marines and a Philippine flag is raised during turnover of Naval Station Subic Bay

The opposition movement within the Philippines subsided after the removal of US personnel from the Philippines in the early 1990s but never truly dissipated in its entirety. Anti-American sentiment remained a prevalent social issue within the collegiate community in Metro Manila, and relatively small demonstrations routinely took place outside the US embassy until the early 2000s. As a result of the events surrounding the 9/11 attacks, the US began restructuring and exercising its rights in the treaty as a part of its war on terrorism, which included the deployment of US forces to the Philippines in Operation Enduring Freedom – Philippines to advise and assist the Armed Forces of the Philippines (AFP).

== 2014 Enhanced Defense Cooperation Agreement ==
On April 28, 2014, desiring to enhance cooperative capacities and efforts in humanitarian assistance and disaster relief, both governments executed an Enhanced Defense Cooperation Agreement (EDCA). It is designed to promote the following between the Philippines and the United States:

- Interoperability
- Capacity building towards AFP modernization
- Strengthening AFP for external defense
- Maritime Security
- Maritime Domain Awareness
- Humanitarian Assistance and Disaster Response (HADR)

The agreement allows US forces access to and use of designated areas and facilities owned and controlled by the Armed Forces of the Philippines at the invitation of the Philippine Government. It contains a clear provision that the US will not establish a permanent military presence or base in the Philippines and a prohibition of entry to the Philippines of nuclear weapons. The EDCA has an initial term of ten years, and thereafter will continue in force until terminated by either party after having given a one-year notice of intention to terminate.

== See also ==
- San Francisco System
- Mutual Defense Treaty § United States
- Southeast Asia Treaty Organization (SEATO; 1954 - 1977)
- North Atlantic Treaty Organization (NATO; 1949–Present)
- ANZUS
- Sino-American Mutual Defense Treaty (1955-1980)
