= BRP Sierra Madre =

US/Philippine Navy tank landing ship

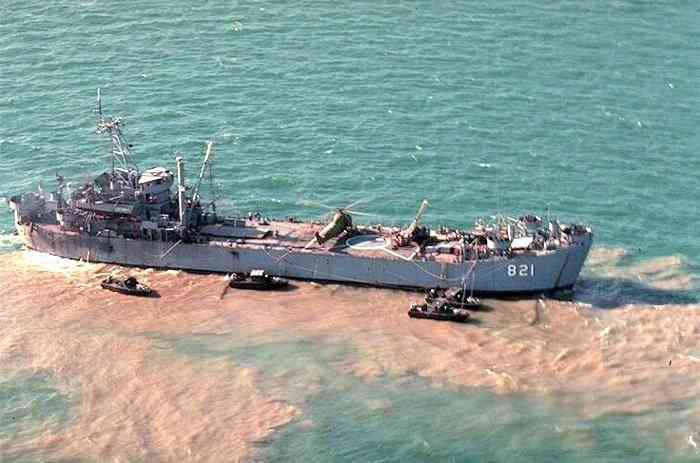
- USS Harnett County (AGP-821) in South Vietnamese waters, c. 1967–1970. Atop her flight deck is a Sikorsky H-34 Choctaw helicopter (left) and a Navy Helicopter Attack (Light) Squadron Three (HAL-3) "Seawolf" UH-1B Huey gunship.

History

United States
- Name: USS LST-821
- Builder: Missouri Valley Bridge & Iron Company, Evansville, Indiana
- Laid down: 19 September 1944
- Launched: 27 October 1944
- Commissioned: 14 November 1944
- Decommissioned: March 1946
- Renamed: USS Harnett County (LST-821), 1 July 1955
- Namesake: Harnett County, North Carolina
- Recommissioned: 20 August 1966
- Decommissioned: 12 October 1970
- Reclassified: AGP-821, 1970
- Honors and awards: 1 battle star (World War II); 9 battle stars, 2 Presidential Unit Citations, 3 Navy Unit Commendations (Vietnam)
- Fate: Transferred to South Vietnam, 12 October 1970

South Vietnam
- Name: RVNS My Tho
- Namesake: Mỹ Tho
- Acquired: 12 October 1970
- Identification: HQ-800
- Fate: Transferred to the Philippines, 5 April 1976

Philippines
- Name: BRP Sierra Madre
- Namesake: Sierra Madre
- Acquired: 5 April 1976
- Identification: LT-57
- Fate: Deliberately grounded 1999 at Second Thomas Shoal (South China Sea). Remains in commission as a forward outport.; 9°47′27.4″N 115°51′23.7″E

General characteristics
- Class & type: LST-542-class tank landing ship
- Displacement: 1,625 long tons (1,651 t) light; 4,080 long tons (4,145 t) full
- Length: 328 ft (100 m)
- Beam: 50 ft (15 m)
- Draft: Unloaded : 2 ft 4 in (0.71 m) forward; 7 ft 6 in (2.29 m) aft; Loaded : 8 ft 2 in (2.49 m) forward; 14 ft 1 in (4.29 m) aft
- Propulsion: 2 × General Motors 12-567 diesel engines, two shafts, twin rudders
- Speed: 12 knots (22 km/h; 14 mph)
- Boats & landing craft carried: 2 LCVPs
- Troops: 16 officers, 147 enlisted men
- Complement: 7 officers, 104 enlisted men
- Armament: 1 × single 3"/50 caliber gun; 8 × 40 mm guns; 12 × 20 mm guns

BRP Sierra Madre (LT-57) is an LST-542-class tank landing ship that is an active duty commissioned vessel under the Philippine Navy.

Originally known as USS LST-821, it was renamed to USS Harnett County (LST-821/AGP-821), built for the United States Navy during World War II. She was named for Harnett County, North Carolina and was the only U.S. Naval vessel to bear the name. It served the United States Navy in World War II and the Vietnam War. It was transferred to South Vietnam's Republic of Vietnam Navy, which named her RVNS My Tho (HQ-800).

After the Vietnam War, Harnett County was transferred to the Philippine Navy, which named her BRP Sierra Madre. In 1999, the Philippine government deliberately had her run aground on Ayungin Shoal in the Spratly Islands to serve as an outpost of the Philippine Marine Corps to affirm the Philippines' exclusive economic zone amid its dispute with China over the Spratly Islands, and it still serves such function as of 2025.

== United States Navy ==
USS LST-821 was laid down on 19 September 1944 at Evansville, Indiana by the Missouri Valley Bridge & Iron Company. The ship was launched on 27 October 1944, sponsored by Mrs. Hugh Robertson Sr. LST-821 was commissioned on 22 November 1944.

=== World War II ===
During World War II, LST-821 was assigned to the Asiatic-Pacific theater, spending most of the remainder of World War II ferrying supplies around Western Pacific ports like Eniwetok, Okinawa, Iejima, Ulithi, and Guam in advance of the planned invasion of the Japanese home islands. LST-821 earned one battle star for her World War II service. Following Japan's surrender in September 1945, the ship supported the occupation of the country. On 11 December she sailed back to the United States where she was decommissioned and placed into reserve on 8 July 1946.

On 1 July 1955 all remaining LSTs were given names of U.S. counties; LST-821 was named USS Harnett County (LST-821).

=== Vietnam War ===
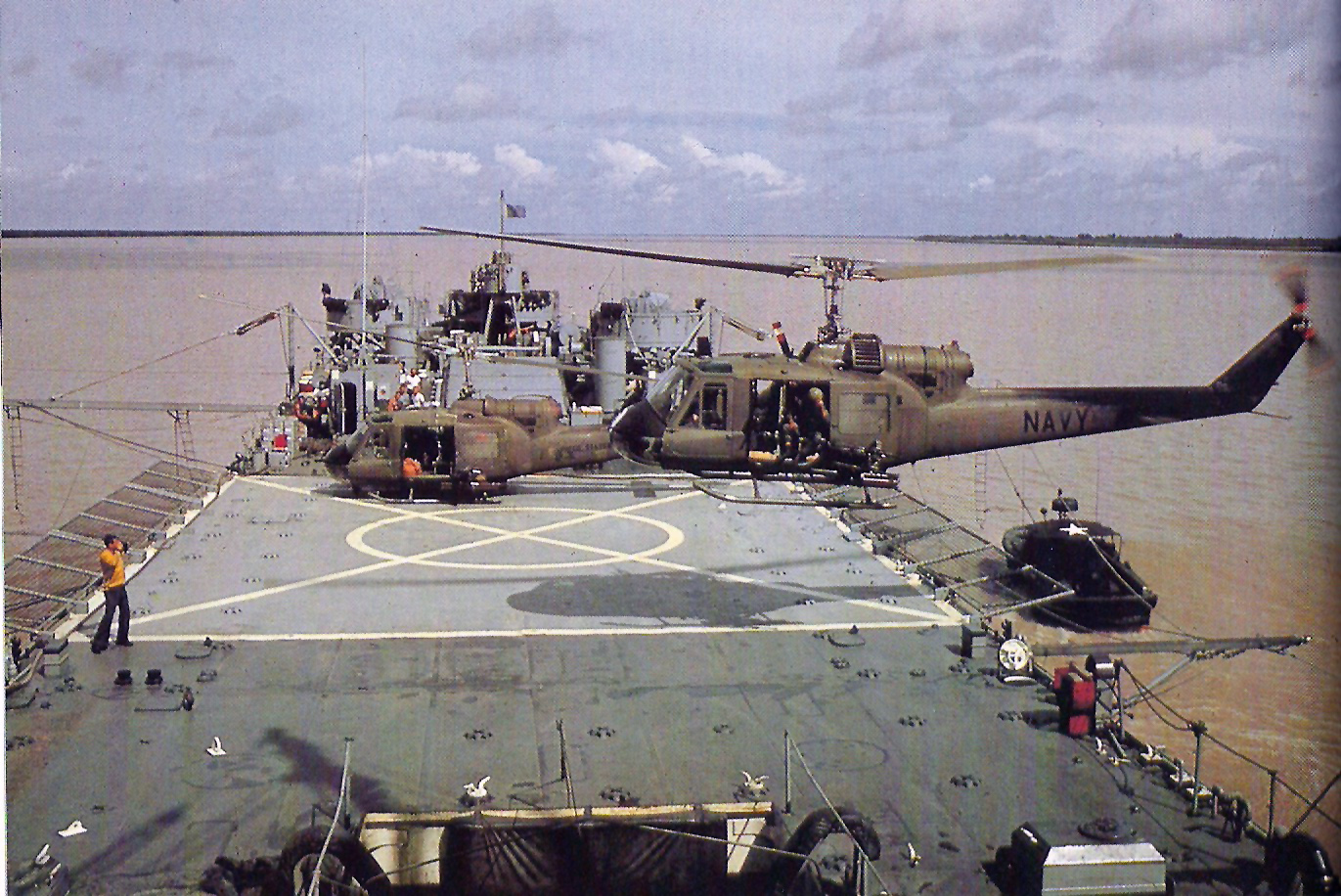
A UH-1E "Huey" lands on the flight deck of Harnett County in the Mekong Delta in October 1967.

Recommissioned on 20 August 1966 at the Mare Island Navy Yard, Vallejo, California, Harnett County saw extensive service during the Vietnam War. Along with the other tank landing ships Garrett County, Hunterdon County, and Jennings County, Harnett County was updated to be a floating base in the Mekong Delta as part of the Mobile Riverine Force. As part of this refit, the ship was equipped with a landing area and maintenance facilities for UH-1B Seawolf gunships, patrol boat (PBR) mooring facilities, and more modern communications equipment. The ship would support ten PBRs and two gunships, and could provide close fire support with its 40mm guns. Harnett County reported for this role on 12 January 1967 and was redesignated as Patrol Craft Tender (AGP-821) for the duration of its service, until late 1969. On 12 October 1970, the ship was decommissioned in Guam.

Over the course of her service in Vietnam, the crew of Harnett County was awarded two Presidential Unit Citations for "extraordinary heroism" and "superb" performance. The ship also received an additional nine battle stars and three Navy Unit Commendations.

== Republic of Vietnam Navy ==
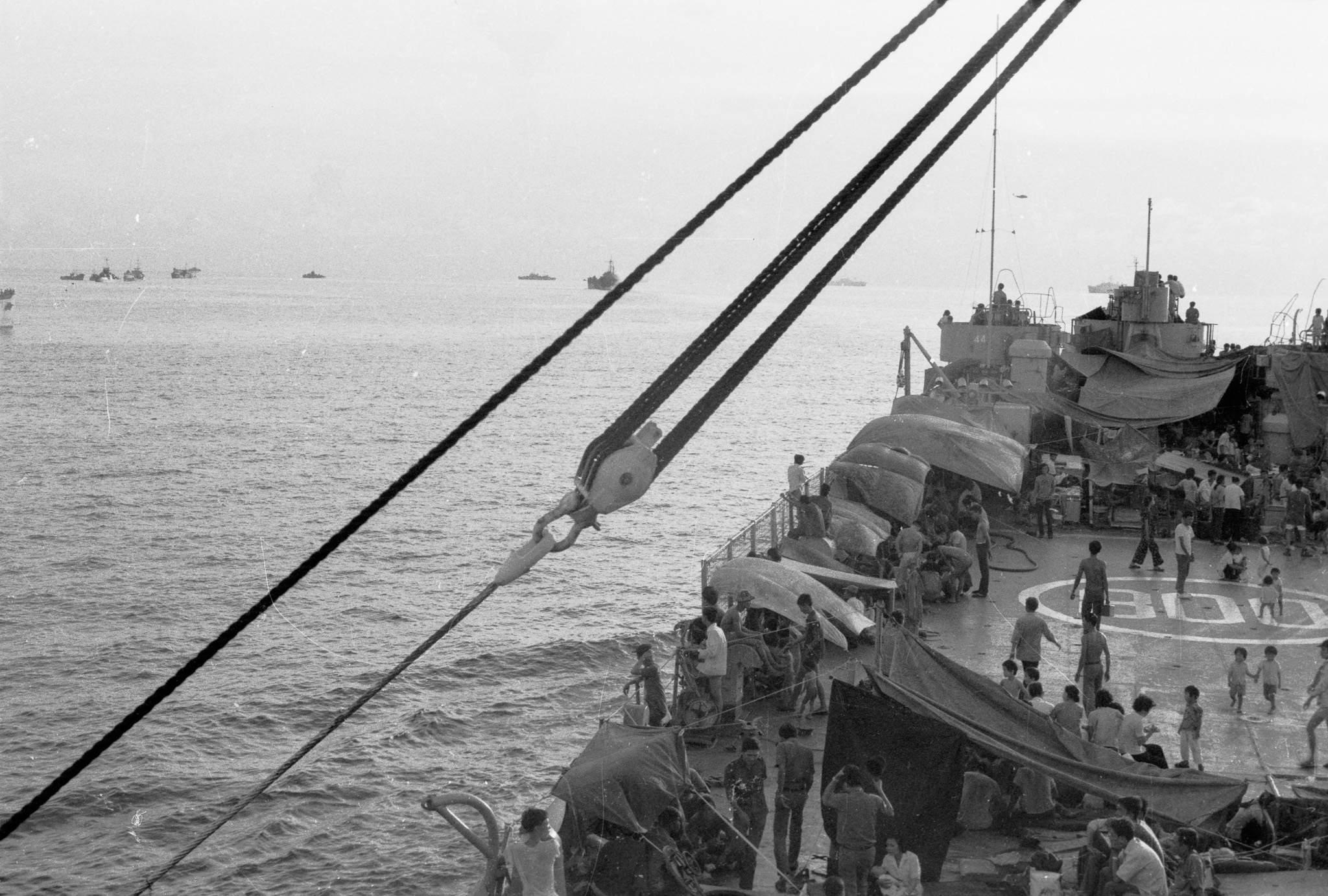
My Tho carrying Vietnamese refugees to Subic Bay after the Fall of Saigon

The United States transferred Harnett County to the Republic of Vietnam Navy under the Security Assistance Program on 12 October 1970 and renamed RVNS My Tho (HQ-800). My Tho would continue to serve in the riverine war until April 1975. At that point, the fall of Saigon was seen as inevitable.

During the fall of the South Vietnamese capital, My Tho was fully loaded with more than 3,000 refugees from the city and set sail downriver towards the sea. She joined a fleet of other South Vietnamese ships to rendezvous with USS Kirk (DE-1087). The situation aboard the ship was desperate, with food and medical supplies running so low that a helicopter left the ship and landed aboard Kirk in order to resupply. The flotilla arrived at Subic Bay in the Philippines where the refugees were disembarked. In exchange for the assistance in harboring the South Vietnamese, the United States brokered an agreement by which it would ensure that all operable ships moored at Subic Bay would transfer ownership to the Philippines.

== Philippine Navy ==
The ship sat moored at Subic Bay for nearly a full year. The Philippine Navy officially acquired the ship on 5 April 1976 and renamed her BRP Dumagat (AL-57). She was quickly renamed again to BRP Sierra Madre (LT-57) after the Sierra Madre mountain range. The ship continued to operate as an amphibious transport for the next decades through the 1990s.

=== Spratly Islands dispute ===
In 1999, the Philippine Navy intentionally ran her aground on the Second Thomas Shoal in order to maintain the Philippines' territorial claim in the area. Since then a detachment of Filipino marines have been continuously stationed on board Sierra Madre to provide a military presence at the site. The Chinese coast guard frequently patrols the area and attempts to prevent the monthly resupply of these Filipino marines. In 2013, The New York Times visited the site and reported on the life of the handful of marines stationed there, and the vessel's role in the geopolitics of the South China Sea. It was inferred that Sierra Madre would never sail again, but had gained importance due to her role as an outpost in the Spratly Islands dispute.

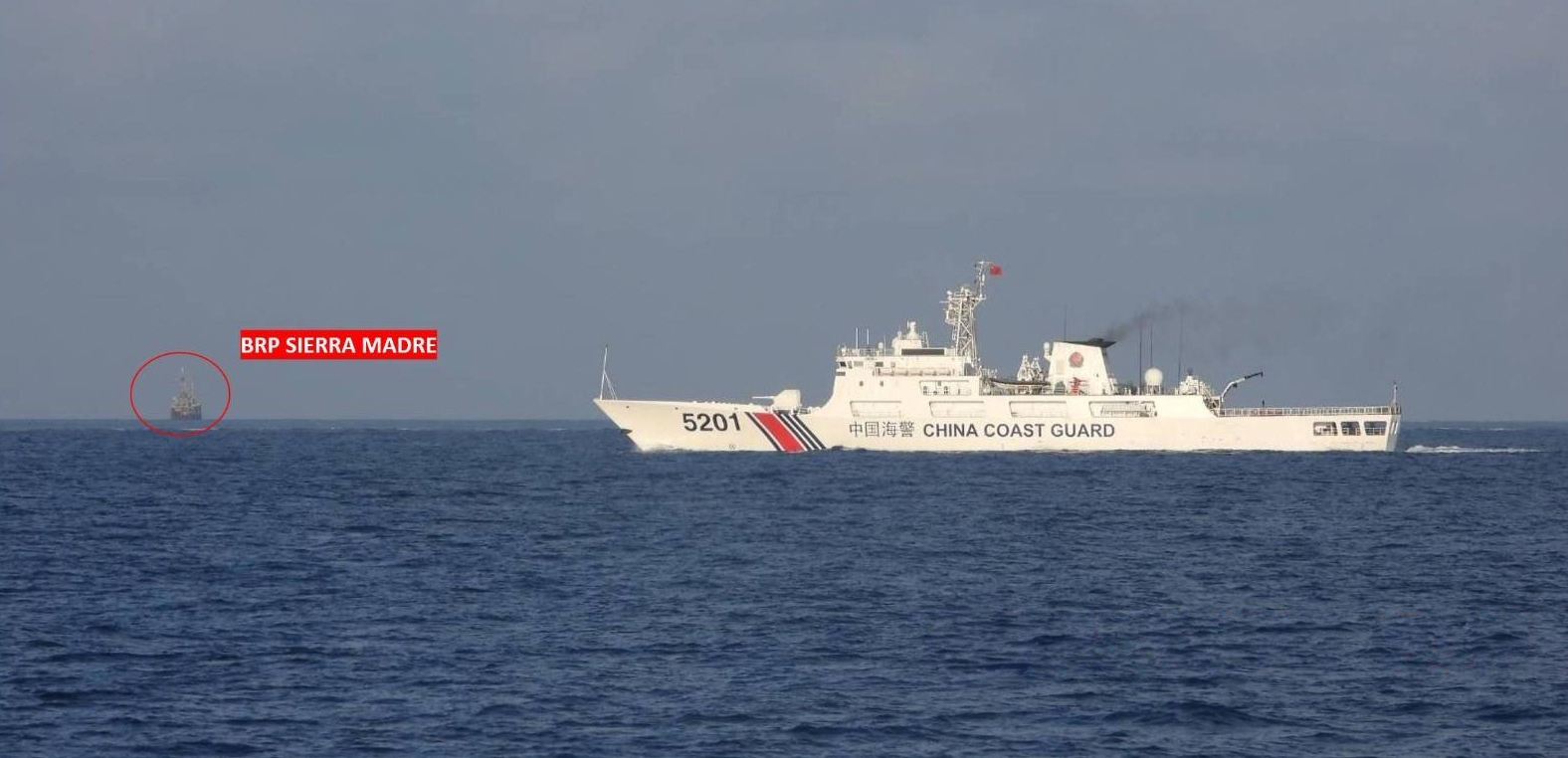
A China Coast Guard (foreground) vessel off Second Thomas Shoal, where BRP Sierra Madre (background) was grounded.

On 11 March 2014, the Philippine government protested to the Chinese chargé d'affaires in Manila that the Chinese Coast Guard had on 9 March prevented two civilian vessels hired by the Philippine Navy from exchanging personnel on, and delivering supplies to the Sierra Madre. This was the first time that Chinese forces had interfered with resupply. On 13 March, the Philippines conducted an aerial resupply mission to the marines. On 1 April 2014, the Philippine Navy succeeded in getting a fishing boat with resupply and replacement marines past the Chinese blockade.

In September 2014, Rupert Wingfield-Hayes, reporting for the BBC, visited Sierra Madre which remained blockaded by the Chinese coastguard. At this time supplies for the garrison of 11 Filipino marines were dropped by air. The ship was described as in a poor condition: "The ship's sides are peppered with massive holes. Waves slosh through them right into the ship's hold."

In July 2015, Philippine Navy spokesman Colonel Edgardo Arevalo said that they were doing maintenance repair on the ship to ensure its minimum habitability.

In November 2021, Chinese Coast Guard ships blocked two civilian boats resupplying the vessel.

On February 6, 2023, the Chinese Coast Guard used what the Philippines Navy described as a military grade laser to temporarily blind crew. On 6 August 2023, Chinese Coast Guard ships fired water cannon at a Philippine Coast Guard ship resupplying the Sierra Madre. Increased encounters with Chinese patrols has coincided with a change in foreign policy from Philippines President Bongbong Marcos who has increased cooperation with the US military. In February 2023, he announced an expansion of the Enhanced Defense Cooperation Agreement.

In October 2023, repairs and retrofitting to the BRP Sierra Madre started. The Philippine government aimed to improve the living conditions inside the ship by repairing the existing sleeping quarters, adding a modern kitchen, and access to the internet.
