= BRP Bagacay =

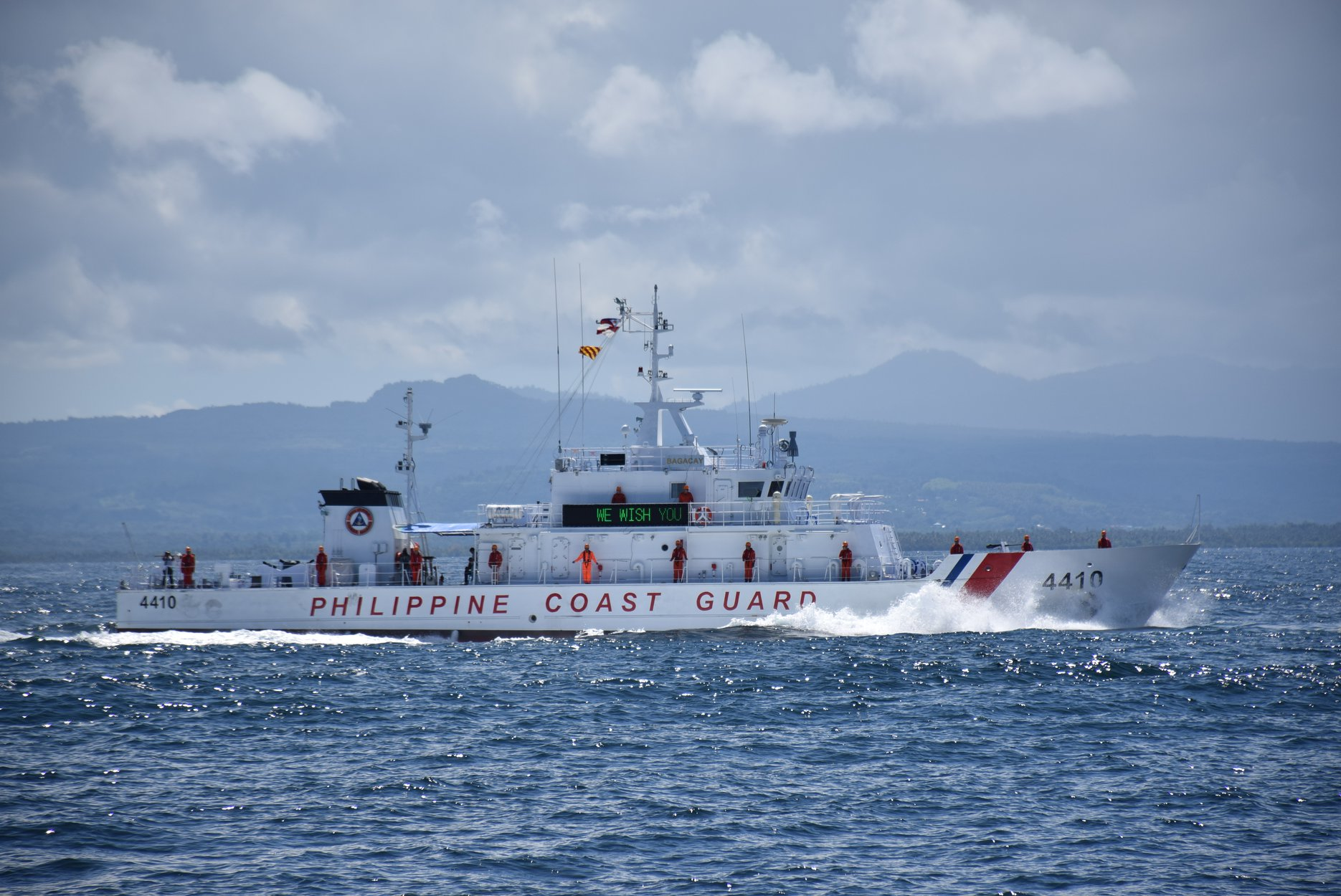
- BRP Bagacay during communication exercise with Japan Coast Guard.

History

Philippines
- Name: BRP Bagacay
- Namesake: Bagacay Point Lighthouse located in Liloan, Cebu
- Ordered: 29 May 2015
- Builder: Japan Marine United, Yokohama, Japan
- Completed: March 2018
- Commissioned: 23 August 2018
- Identification: IMO number: 9809502; MMSI number: 548917500; Callsign: 4DFT2; Hull number: MRRV-4410
- Status: in active service

General characteristics
- Class & type: Parola-class patrol vessel
- Length: 44.5 m (146 ft)
- Beam: 7.5 m (25 ft)
- Draft: 4 m (4.0 m)
- Propulsion: 2 × MTU 12V4000M93L 12-cylinder diesel engines, Total diesel engine output: 3,460 shp (2,580 kW)
- Speed: Maximum @ 25 knots (46 km/h), cruising 15 knots (28 km/h)
- Range: 1,500 nautical miles (2,800 km)
- Boats & landing craft carried: 1 × RHIB work boat
- Complement: 25 (5 officers, 20 enlisted)
- Sensors & processing systems: Furuno FAR series X & S-band navigation radars

BRP Bagacay (MRRV-4410) is the ninth ship of the Parola-class patrol vessels of the Philippine Coast Guard.

== Design and features ==
The Philippine Coast Guard clarified that the ship is a law enforcement vessel and is designed to conduct environmental and humanitarian missions, as well as maritime security operations and patrol missions.

The ship was designed with an armored navigation bridge, and is equipped with fire monitors, night vision capability, a work boat, and radio direction finder capability.

The ship will be equipped with communications and radio monitoring equipment from Rohde & Schwarz, specifically the M3SR Series 4400 and Series 4100 software-defined communication radios, and DDF205 radio monitoring equipment. These equipment enhances the ship's reconnaissance, pursuit and communications capabilities.

== Construction, delivery and commissioning ==
After completed sea trials in Yokohama, Japan, BRP Bagacay arrived at Philippine Coast Guard National Headquarters on May 31, 2018.

On August 23, 2018, Bagacay and BRP Cape Engaño (MRRV-4411) commissioned into Philippine Coast Guard fleet.

== Service history ==
In September 2018, the BRP Bagacay was officially deployed to the PCG Southwestern Mindanao District based in Zamboanga City where she joins two other ships of her class already deployed there, the BRP Malabrigo (MRRV-4402) and BRP Cape San Agustin (MRRV-4408).

In November 2018, the ship was transferred to Banguingui, Sulu (originally named Tongkil) to augment the security forces in that area.

In July 2021, the BRP Bagacay intercepted the motor boat Dynasty which was carrying 70 boxes of smuggled cigarettes off the coast of Zamboanga City.

In early August 2021, the ship conducted a Medical Evacuation (MEDEVAC) of an Australian veterinarian from the livestock carrier MV Maysora off the coast of Zamboanga City. The veterinarian suffered a bone fracture when he fell from a cattle pen while working

In late August 2021, the BRP Bagacay rescued a French national whose yacht Ouma went adrift after suffering engine trouble off the waters of Tubbataha Reef in the Sulu Sea.

On April 30, 2024, the Bagacay was on a mission to supply food and water to Filipino fishermen doing their livelihood at Scarborough Shoal inside the exclusive economic zone of the Philippines in the South China Sea when she was harassed and bombarded with water cannons by Chinese Coast Guard ships causing damage to her canopy and steel railings.

On August 18, 2024, the ship was hulled in a maritime incident involving the PRC Navy near Sabina Shoal in the South China Sea, known in the Philippines as Escoda Shoal.
