= BRP Capones =

Philippine Coast Guard Vessel

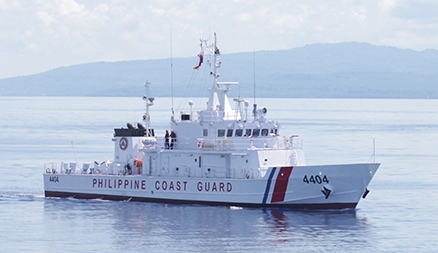

History

Philippines
- Name: BRP Capones
- Namesake: Lighthouse Capones located in Capones Island, Zambales
- Ordered: 29 May 2015
- Builder: Japan Marine United, Yokohama, Japan
- Completed: April 2017
- Commissioned: 30 May 2017
- Identification: IMO number: 9809447; MMSI number: 548153500; Callsign: 4DFP2; Hull number: MRRV-4404
- Status: In active service

General characteristics
- Class & type: Parola-class patrol vessel
- Length: 44.5 m (146 ft 0 in)
- Beam: 7.5 m (24 ft 7 in)
- Draft: 4 m (13 ft 1 in)
- Propulsion: 2 × MTU 12V4000M93L 12-cylinder diesel engines, Total diesel engine output: 3,460 shp (2,580 kW)
- Speed: Maximum 25 knots (46 km/h)
- Range: 1,500 nautical miles (2,800 km)
- Boats & landing craft carried: 1 × RHIB work boat
- Complement: 25 (5 officers, 20 enlisted)
- Sensors & processing systems: Furuno FAR series X & S-band navigation radars

BRP Capones (MRRV-4404) is the fourth ship of the Parola-class patrol vessels of the Philippine Coast Guard.

== Design and features ==
The Philippine Coast Guard clarified that the ship is a law enforcement vessel and is designed to conduct environmental and humanitarian missions, as well as maritime security operations and patrol missions.

The ship was designed with a bulletproof navigation bridge, and is equipped with fire monitors, night vision capability, a work boat, and radio direction finder capability.

The ship will be equipped with communications and radio monitoring equipment from Rohde & Schwarz, specifically the M3SR Series 4400 and Series 4100 software-defined communication radios, and DDF205 radio monitoring equipment. This equipment enhances the ship's reconnaissance, pursuit and communications capabilities.

== Delivery and Commissioning ==
According to The Philippine Star reported on May 21, 2017, Philippine Coast Guard spokesman Commander Armand Balilo said BRP Capones have arrived in Philippines on May 16.

She was commissioned into service on November 21, 2017, together with BRP Suluan and BRP Sindangan.

== Service history ==
In May 2018, Capones participated in a fluvial procession in Manila Bay by carrying the image of the Our Lady of Mount Carmel.

In September 2018, the ship assisted in the firefighting operations on MV Lite Ferry 28 which caught fire while docked in Argao, Cebu. The fire was immediately extinguished and no casualties were reported among the ship's 92 passengers and 29 crew members. In October, Capones towed the vessel MV Mags Royal back to port after the ship ran aground off Bansaan Island in Talibon, Bohol, suffering a nine-by-six-inch (230 by 150 mm) hole in the hull near the rudder. All of Mags Royal's passengers and crew were brought back to safety.
