= BRP Sindangan =

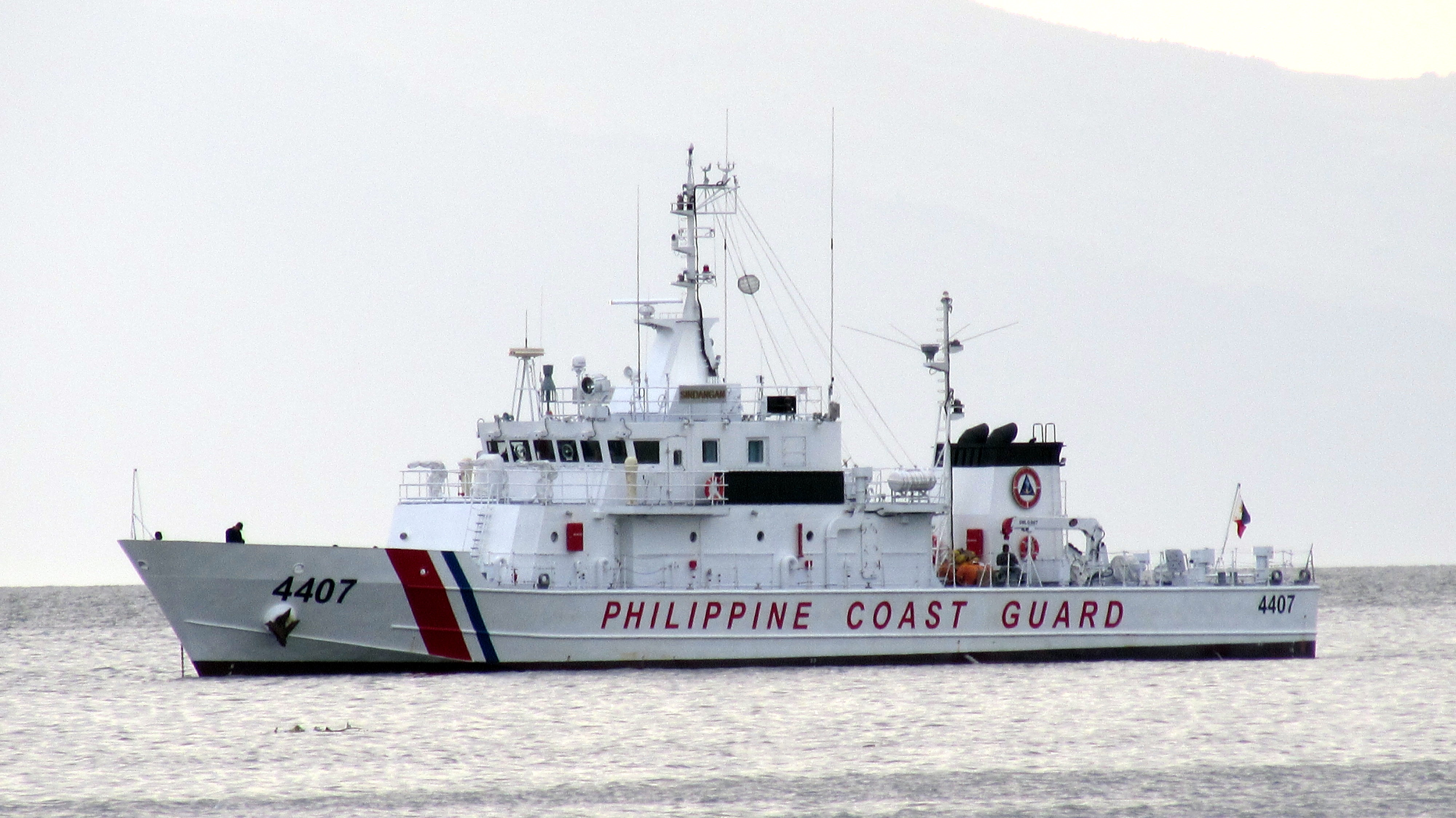
- The BRP Sindangan (MRRV-4407) patrolling Manila Bay during the 31st ASEAN Summit.

History

Philippines
- Name: BRP Sindangan
- Namesake: Sindangan Lighthouse located in Sindangan, Zamboanga del Norte
- Ordered: 29 May 2015
- Builder: Japan Marine United, Yokohama, Japan
- Completed: August 2017
- Identification: IMO number: 9809473; MMSI number: 548166500; Callsign: 4DFQ7; Hull number: MRRV-4407
- Status: In Service

General characteristics
- Class & type: Parola-class patrol vessel
- Length: 44.5 m (146 ft)
- Beam: 7.5 m (25 ft)
- Draft: 4 m (4.0 m)
- Propulsion: 2 × MTU 12V4000M93L 12-cylinder diesel engines, Total diesel engine output: 3,460 shp (2,580 kW)
- Speed: Maximum @ 25 knots (46 km/h), cruising 15 knots (28 km/h)
- Range: 1,500 nautical miles (2,800 km)
- Boats & landing craft carried: 1 × RHIB work boat
- Complement: 25 (5 officers, 20 enlisted)
- Sensors & processing systems: Furuno FAR series X & S-band navigation radars

BRP Sindangan (MRRV-4407) is the sixth ship of the Parola-class patrol vessels of the Philippine Coast Guard.

== Design and features ==
The Philippine Coast Guard clarified that the ship is a law enforcement vessel and is designed to conduct environmental and humanitarian missions, as well as maritime security operations and patrol missions.

The ship was designed with a bulletproof navigation bridge, and is equipped with fire monitors, night vision capability, a work boat, and radio direction finder capability.

The ship will be equipped with communications and radio monitoring equipment from Rohde & Schwarz, specifically the M3SR Series 4400 and Series 4100 software-defined communication radios, and DDF205 radio monitoring equipment. These equipment enhances the ship's reconnaissance, pursuit and communications capabilities.

== Construction, delivery and commissioning ==
BRP Sindangan underwent sea trials in September 2017 and was commissioned into service on November 21, 2017, together with the BRP Capones (MRRV-4404) and BRP Suluan (MRRV-4406).

== Service history ==
In September 2018, the BRP Sindangan along with its sister ship the BRP Cabra (MRRV-4409) and the Philippine Navy vessels BRP Nestor Reinoso (PG-380) and BRP Benguet (LS-507) secured the BRP Gregorio del Pilar (FF-15), which ended up being grounded at the Hasa-Hasa Shoal (also known as the Half Moon Shoal) in the South China Sea. Divers from the BRP Sindangan also assessed the hull of the BRP Gregorio del Pilar, which was eventually pulled out from the shoal a couple of days later.

== Gallery ==
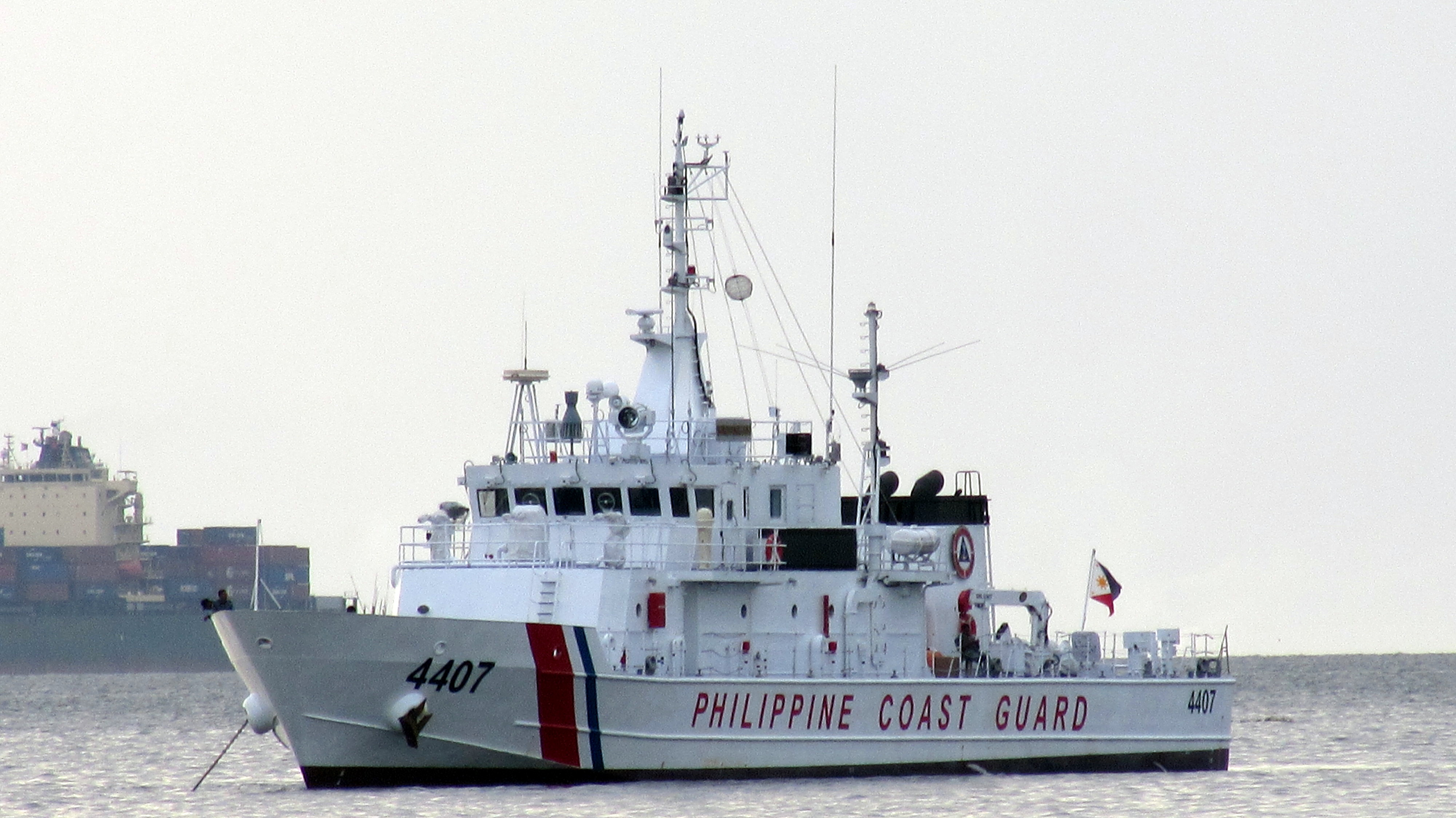
The BRP Sindangan patrolling Manila Bay

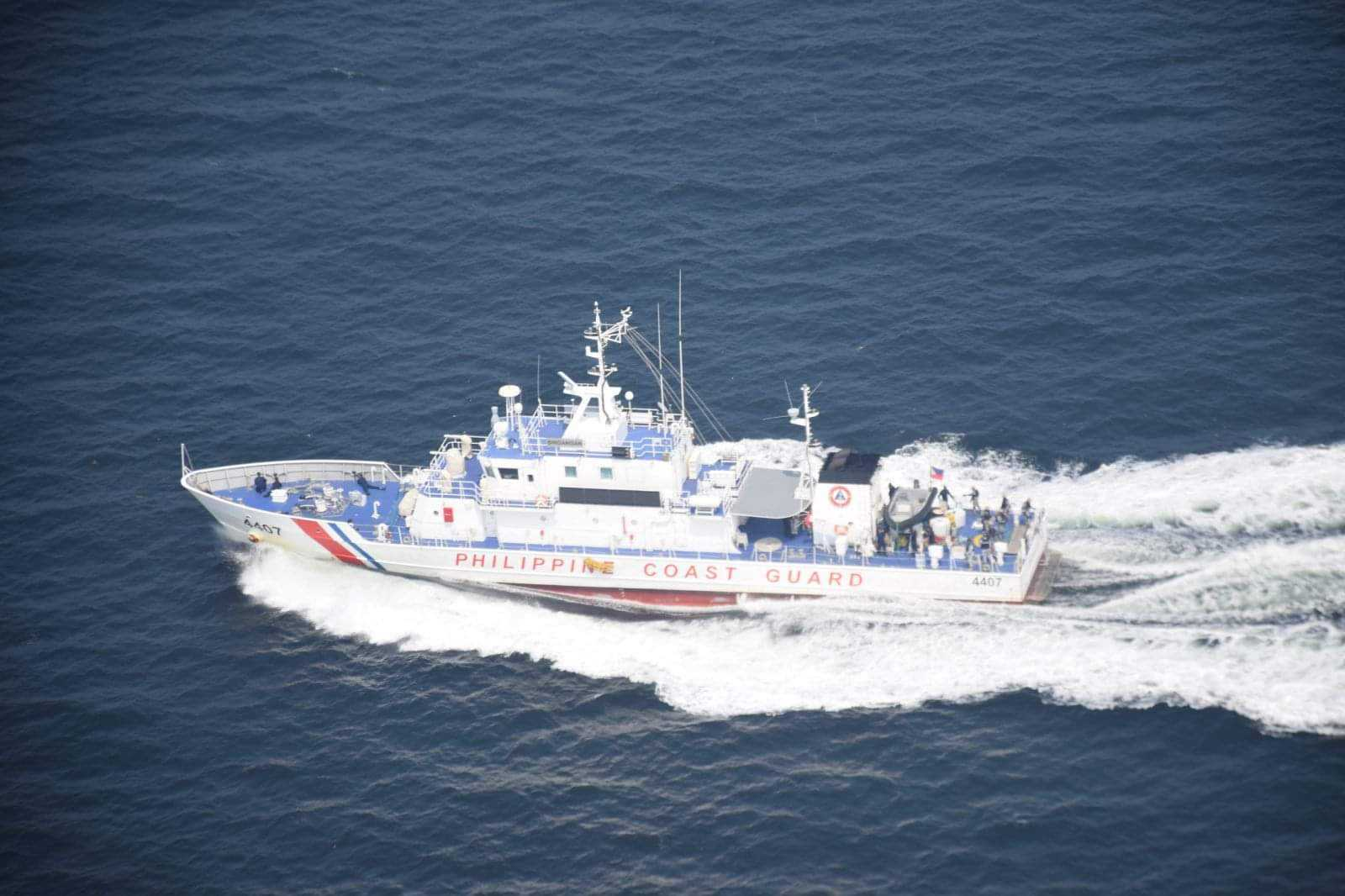
BRP Sindangan (MRRV-4407) during SEACAT Exercise 2021 at the vicinity waters off Bataan on 14 August 2021.
