= Parola-class patrol vessel =

Small Philippine Navy ships

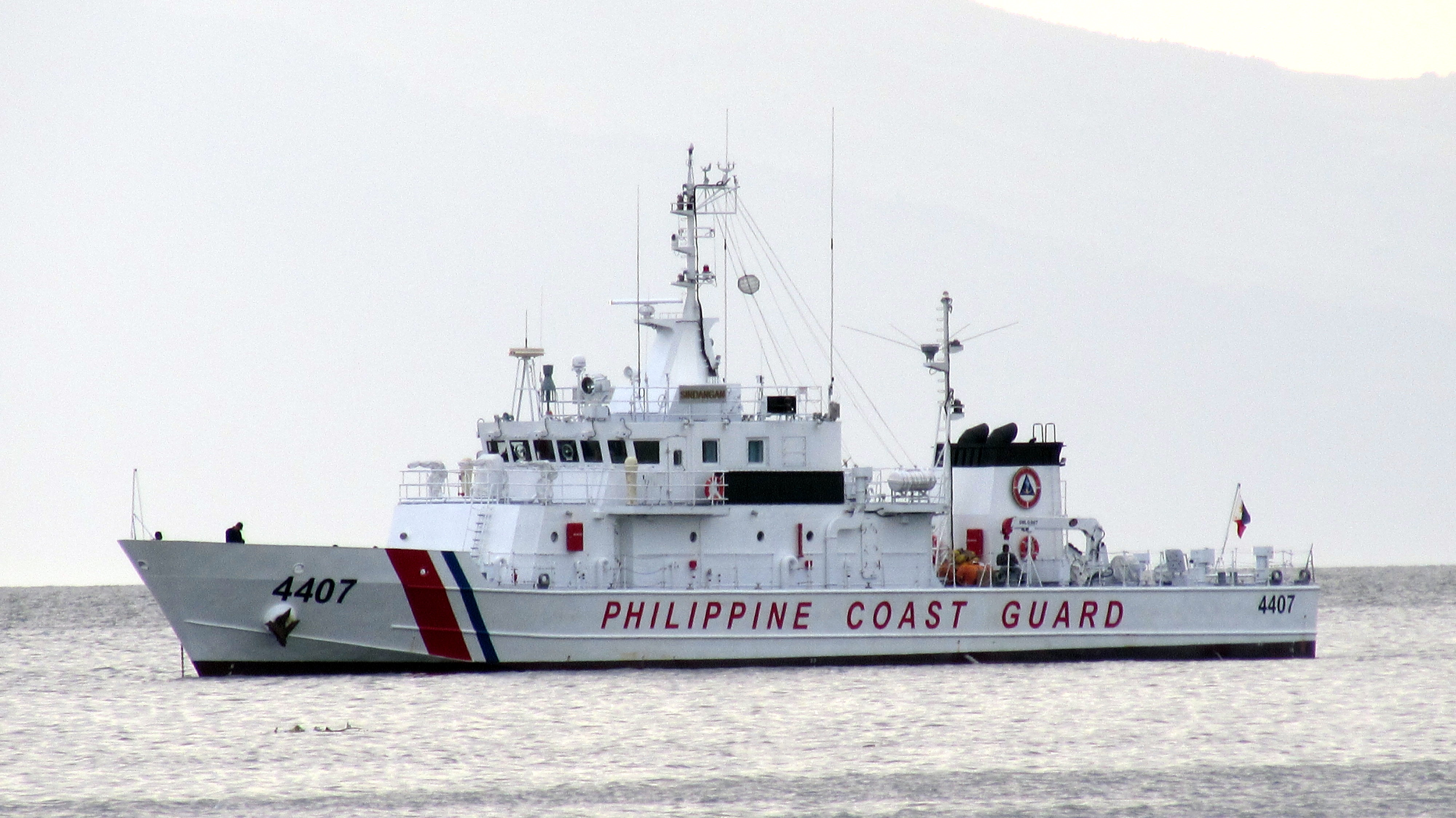
- BRP Sindangan, a Multi-Role Response Vessel (MRRV)

Class overview
- Name: Parola class patrol vessel
- Builders: Japan Marine United, Yokohama, Japan
- Operators: Philippine Coast Guard
- Cost: ₱460M (FY2015) per vessel
- In commission: 2016–present
- Planned: 10
- Active: 10

General characteristics
- Type: Patrol vessel
- Displacement: 321 t (316 long tons)
- Length: 44.5 m (146 ft 0 in)
- Beam: 7.5 m (24 ft 7 in)
- Draft: 4 m (13 ft 1 in)
- Propulsion: 2 × MTU 12V4000M93L 12-cylinder diesel engines, with total output of 2,580 kW (3,460 shp)
- Speed: 25 knots (46 km/h) maximum speed
- Range: 1,500 nautical miles (2,800 km)
- Boats & landing craft carried: 1 x RHIB
- Complement: 25 (5 officers, 20 enlisted)
- Sensors & processing systems: Furuno FAR series X & S-band navigation radars
- Armament: 2 × .50 caliber M2 Browning machine guns; 1 × 12.7mm Elbit Systems WAVE 350 RCWS (6 ships); 1 × LRAD 450XL long range acoustic device

The Parola-class patrol vessel consists of ten vessels currently in service with the Philippine Coast Guard. Their hull number prefix "MRRV" means they are officially classified as "multi-role response vessels". They will be named after primary lighthouses in the Philippines, with the Filipino word "Parola" meaning "lighthouse" in English. The lead ship, BRP Tubbataha, is named after a major lighthouse situated in the Tubbataha Marine National Park in Palawan.

== Project planning and funding ==
The ships, a based on the "Maritime Safety Capability Improvement Project for the Philippine Coast Guard" project of the Philippine Coast Guard and the Department of Transportation and Communication (DOTC), and was funded by the Japan International Cooperation Agency's (JICA) Official Development Assistance (ODA) loan. JICA will provide Php 7,373,700,000.00, while the Philippine government will shoulder Php 1,434,000,000.00 of the entire project value.

Japanese shipbuilders were shortlisted by the DOTC, among them Japan Marine United Co., Mitsubishi Heavy Industries Ltd., Nigata Shipbuilding and Repair Inc., and Sumidagawa Shipyard Co. Inc.

Japan Marine United Corporation (JMU) won the tender against other Japanese shipbuilders with a bid price of Y12,790,000,000 (Php 4,600,000,000.00).

Under the project terms, the MRRVs will be used by the PCG for the following purposes:

- Primary rescue vessels within the PCG Districts' areas of responsibility (AOR) when the extent of the disaster is beyond the capability of floating assets deployed within the area
- Assistance in the control of oil pollution and protection of the marine environment
- Enforcement of applicable maritime laws within the designated AOR, particularly relating to illegal fishing and sea patrol
- Service as platform for rapid response during relief operations in the area
- Transport of personnel and logistical support.

== Design and features ==
The Philippine Coast Guard clarified that the ships are designed for law enforcement duties, to conduct environmental and humanitarian missions, as well as maritime security operations and patrol missions.

The ships are designed with a bulletproof navigation bridge, and is equipped with fire monitors, night vision capability, a work boat, and radio direction finder capability.

The ships are equipped with communications and radio monitoring equipment from Rohde & Schwarz, specifically the M3SR Series 4400 and Series 4100 software-defined communication radios, and DDF205 radio monitoring equipment. These equipment enhances the ship's reconnaissance, pursuit and communications capabilities.

== Ships in class ==
| Hull number | Name | Builder | Launched | Commissioned | Status |
|---|---|---|---|---|---|
| MRRV-4401 | BRP Tubbataha | Japan Marine United | 12 May 2016 | 12 October 2016 | Active |
| MRRV-4402 | BRP Malabrigo | Japan Marine United | 4 October 2016 | 22 December 2016 | Active |
| MRRV-4403 | BRP Malapascua | Japan Marine United | January 2017 | 7 March 2017 | Active |
| MRRV-4404 | BRP Capones | Japan Marine United | March 2017 | 20 November 2017 | Active |
| MRRV-4406 | BRP Suluan | Japan Marine United | June 2017 | 20 November 2017 | Active |
| MRRV-4407 | BRP Sindangan | Japan Marine United | August 2017 | 20 November 2017 | Active |
| MRRV-4408 | BRP Cape San Agustin | Japan Marine United | September 2017 | 28 March 2018 | Active |
| MRRV-4409 | BRP Cabra | Japan Marine United | January 2018 | 28 March 2018 | Active |
| MRRV-4410 | BRP Bagacay | Japan Marine United | May 2018 | 23 August 2018 | Active |
| MRRV-4411 | BRP Cape Engaño | Japan Marine United | July 2018 | 23 August 2018 | Active |
