= BRP Tubbataha =

2016 Parola-class patrol vessel

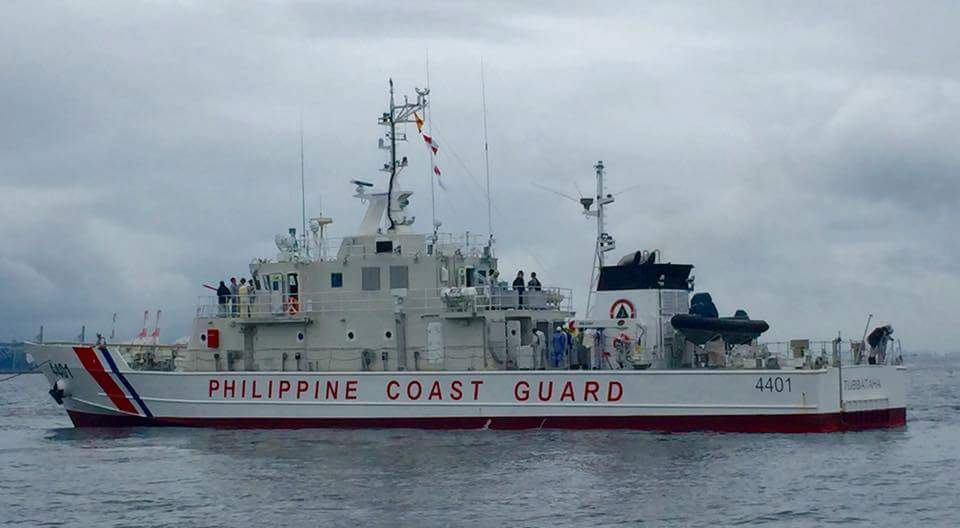
- BRP Tubbataha during its sea trials prior to delivery to the Philippine Coast Guard.

History

Philippines
- Name: Tubbataha
- Namesake: Lighthouse Tubbataha located at the Tubbataha Marine National Park in Palawan
- Operator: Philippine Coast Guard
- Ordered: 29 May 2015
- Builder: Japan Marine United, Yokohama, Japan
- Laid down: 6 February 2016
- Launched: 12 May 2016
- Commissioned: 12 October 2016
- Identification: IMO number: 9809411; MMSI number: 548126500; Callsign: 4DFL9; Hull number: MRRV-4401
- Status: in active service

General characteristics
- Class & type: Parola-class patrol vessel
- Length: 44.5 m (146 ft)
- Beam: 7.5 m (25 ft)
- Draft: 4 m (4.0 m)
- Propulsion: 2 × MTU 12V4000M93L 12-cylinder diesel engines, Total diesel engine output: 3,460 shp (2,580 kW)
- Speed: Maximum @ 25 knots (46 km/h), cruising 15 knots (28 km/h)
- Range: 1,500 nautical miles (2,800 km)
- Boats & landing craft carried: 1 × RHIB work boat
- Complement: 25 (5 officers, 20 enlisted)
- Sensors & processing systems: Furuno FAR series X & S-band navigation radars

BRP Tubbataha (MRRV-4401) is the lead ship of the Parola-class patrol vessels of the Philippine Coast Guard, and is one of the newer additions to the agency's fleet.

== Design and features ==
The Philippine Coast Guard clarified that the ship is a law enforcement vessel and is designed to conduct environmental and humanitarian missions, as well as maritime security operations and patrol missions.

The ship was designed with a bulletproof navigation bridge, and is equipped with fire monitors, night vision capability, a work boat, and radio direction finder capability.

The ship is equipped with communications and radio monitoring equipment from Rohde & Schwarz, specifically the M3SR Series 4400 and Series 4100 software-defined communication radios, and DDF205 radio monitoring equipment. These equipment enhances the ship's reconnaissance, pursuit and communications capabilities.

== Construction, delivery and commissioning ==
The ship's keel was officially laid down on February 6, 2016, and the ship was launched on May 12, 2016. It underwent sea trials starting in June 2016 until before its delivery.

The ship left Yokohama, Japan on August 11, 2016, and arrived in the Port of Manila on August 18, 2016, where it was formally handed over to the Philippine Coast Guard to prepare for final fitting works, crew training, and eventual commissioning.

The ship was commissioned into service as part of the Philippine Coast Guard's 115th founding anniversary celebrations on October 12, 2016 at Pier 13 in Manila, led by Pres. Rodrigo Roa Duterte and the Japanese ambassador to the Philippines Kazuhide Ishikawa.

== Notable operational deployments ==
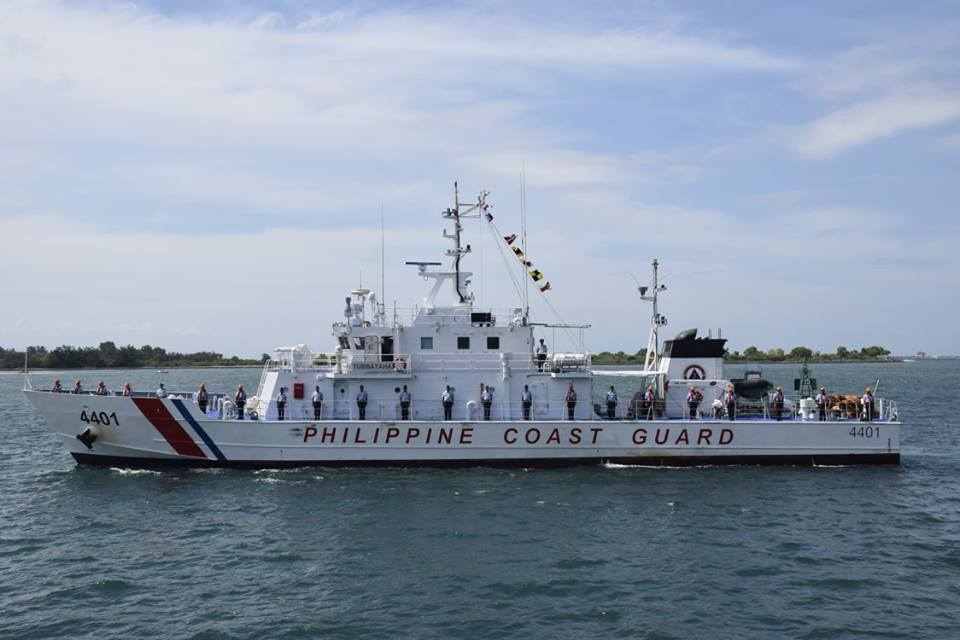
BRP Tubbataha during its arrival for MARPOLEX 2017

Tubbataha, together with BRP Davao del Norte, were deployed to the Scarborough (Panatag) Shoal on November 3, 2016, and was meant to conduct inspections, make its presence felt on the area, and "test the waters" following the reported incident-free expedition of Filipino fishermen in the contested sea feature. The ships were instructed not to conduct provocative action as China Coast Guard (CCG) ships are still in the shoal. The two ships were backed-up by a larger PCG vessel, the BRP Pampanga.

Tubbataha, together with BRP Pampanga, BRP Nueva Vizcaya and TB Habagat were part of the task force sent to Bali, Indonesia to participate in the biennial maritime pollution exercise MARPOLEX Bali 2017 from May 15 to 18, 2017, together with other ships of the Philippine Coast Guard, as well as its counterparts from Indonesia and Japan.
