= BRP Cape Engaño =

Philippine patrol vessel built in 2018

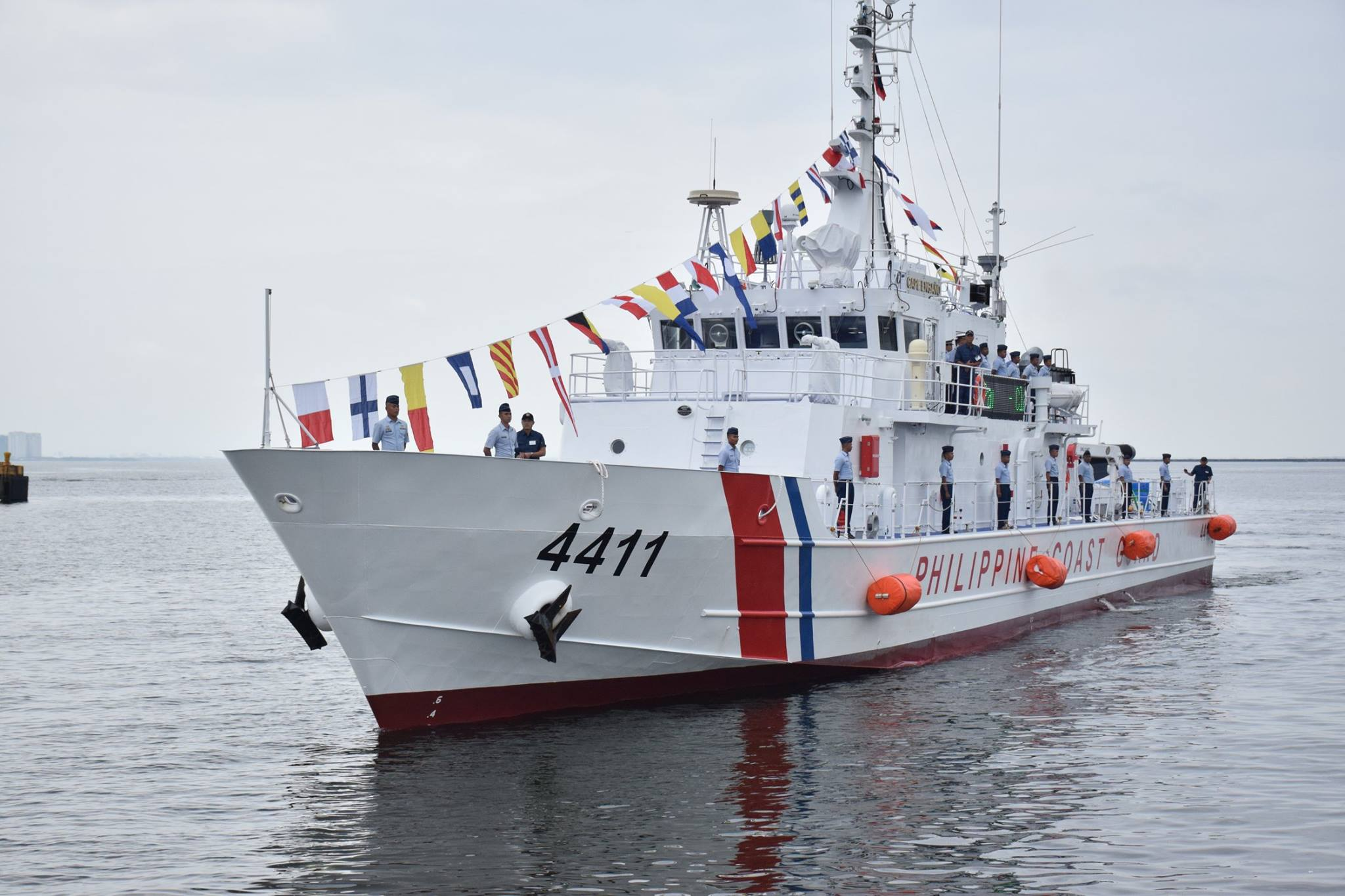
- BRP Cape Engaño (MRRV-4411)

History

Philippines
- Name: BRP Cape Engaño
- Namesake: Cape Engaño Lighthouse located in Palaui Island, Santa Ana, Cagayan
- Ordered: 29 May 2015
- Builder: Japan Marine United, Yokohama, Japan
- Completed: July 2018
- Commissioned: 23 August 2018
- Identification: IMO number: 9809514; MMSI number: 548928500; Callsign: 4DFU3; Hull number: MRRV-4411
- Status: in active service

General characteristics
- Class & type: Parola-class patrol vessel
- Length: 44.5 m (146 ft)
- Beam: 7.5 m (25 ft)
- Draft: 4 m (4.0 m)
- Propulsion: 2 × MTU 12V4000M93L 12-cylinder diesel engines, Total diesel engine output: 3,460 shp (2,580 kW)
- Speed: Maximum @ 25 knots (46 km/h), cruising 15 knots (28 km/h)
- Range: 1,500 nautical miles (2,800 km)
- Boats & landing craft carried: 1 × RHIB work boat
- Complement: 25 (5 officers, 20 enlisted)
- Sensors & processing systems: Furuno FAR series X & S-band navigation radars
- Armament: 2 x M2 Browning .50 BMG (12.7×99mm NATO)

BRP Cape Engaño (MRRV-4411) is the tenth ship of the Parola-class patrol vessels of the Philippine Coast Guard.

== Design and features ==
The Philippine Coast Guard clarified that the ship is a law enforcement vessel and is designed to conduct environmental and humanitarian missions, as well as maritime security operations and patrol missions.

The ship was designed with a bulletproof navigation bridge, and is equipped with fire monitors, night vision capability, a work boat, and radio direction finder capability.

The ship will be equipped with communications and radio monitoring equipment from Rohde & Schwarz, specifically the M3SR Series 4400 and Series 4100 software-defined communication radios, and DDF205 radio monitoring equipment. These equipment enhances the ship's reconnaissance, pursuit and communications capabilities.

== Construction, delivery and commissioning ==
BRP Cape Engaño was completed sea trials in Yokohama, Japan and arrived at the Philippine Coast Guard National Headquarters in August 2018.

BRP Cape Engaño was commissioned by the Philippine Coast Guard at Philippine Coast Guard National Headquarters on August 23, 2018, along with BRP Bagacay in a double commission ceremony.

== Operational history ==
In October 2018, the BRP Cape Engaño along with the BRP Boracay (2401) assisted in the transfer of passengers of the M/V Super Shuttle 18 which was stranded off the port of Malay, Aklan due to engine trouble. All of the 142 passengers of the M/V Super Shuttle 18 were later safely brought to the Caticlan Jetty Port.

=== China Coast Guard ramming incident ===
On August 19, 2024, Cape Engaño along with the BRP Bagacay suffered damage after being rammed by China Coast Guard ships off the Sabina Shoal. Bagacay suffered a 3-foot hole above the waterline. A CBS 60 Minutes crew with journalist Cecilia Vega were onboard the Cape Engaño when it was surrounded by 14 Chinese Coast Guard and Maritime Militia ships and rammed at 4am by a China Coast Guard vessel. The ramming tore a 3 1/2 foot hole above the waterline on the Cape Engaño. Footage showing the damage was on 60 Minutes in the segment "Danger in the South China Sea" aired on September 15, 2024.

== See also ==
- Parola-class patrol vessel
- Philippine Coast Guard
