= BRP Suluan =

Patrol vessel of the Philippine Coast Guard

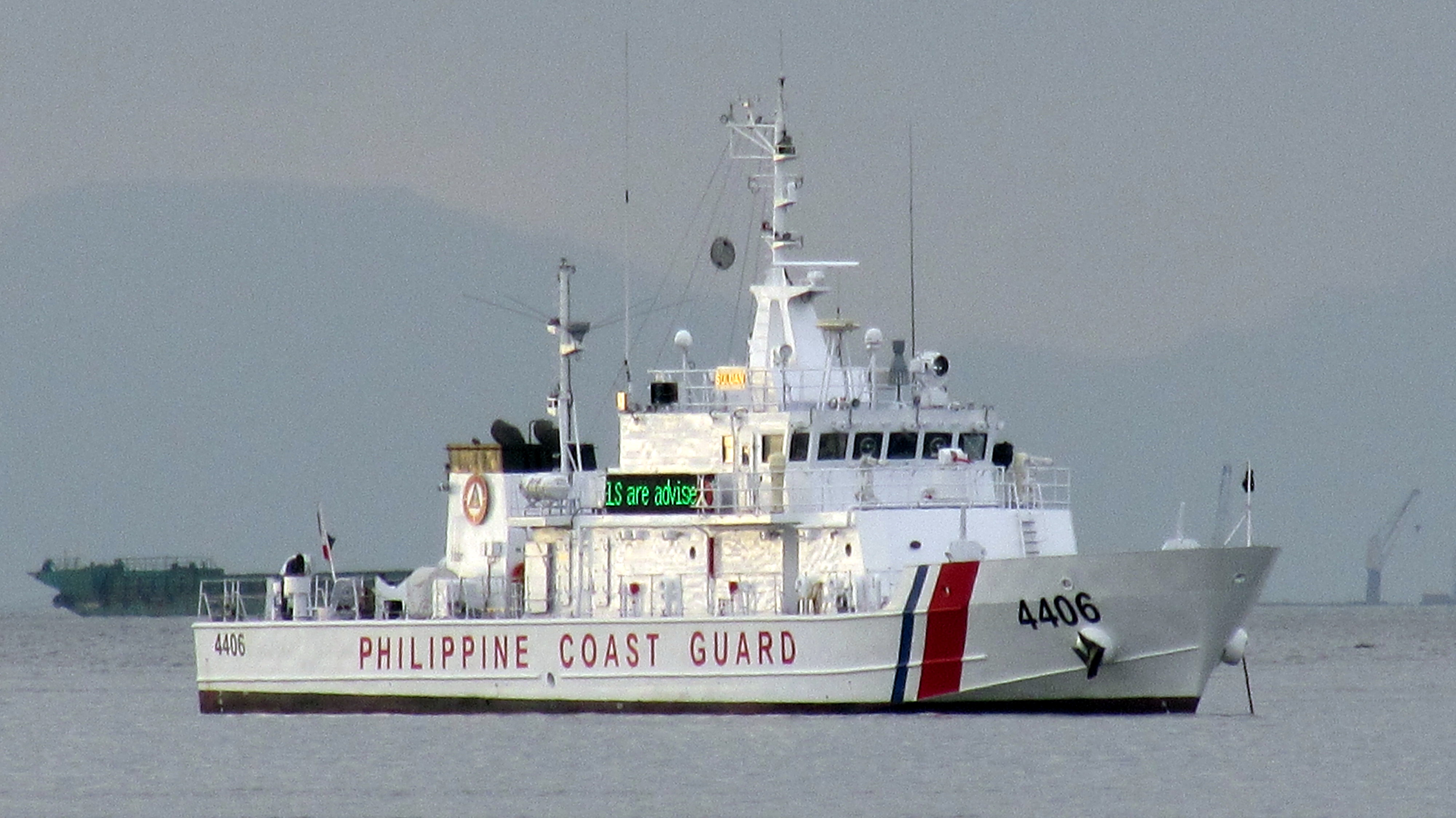
- The BRP Suluan (MRRV-4406) patrolling Manila Bay during the 31st ASEAN Summit.

History

Philippines
- Name: BRP Suluan
- Namesake: Suluan Lighthouse at Suluan Island located in Guiuan, Eastern Samar
- Ordered: 29 May 2015
- Builder: Japan Marine United, Yokohama, Japan
- Completed: June 2017
- Identification: IMO number: 9809459; MMSI number: 548160500; Callsign: 4DFP9; Hull number: MRRV-4406
- Status: in active service

General characteristics
- Class & type: Parola-class patrol vessel
- Length: 44.5 m (146 ft)
- Beam: 7.5 m (25 ft)
- Draft: 4 m (4.0 m)
- Propulsion: 2 × MTU 12V4000M93L 12-cylinder diesel engines, Total diesel engine output: 3,460 shp (2,580 kW)
- Speed: Maximum @ 25 knots (46 km/h), cruising 15 knots (28 km/h)
- Range: 1,500 nautical miles (2,800 km)
- Boats & landing craft carried: 1 × RHIB work boat
- Complement: 25 (5 officers, 20 enlisted)
- Sensors & processing systems: Furuno FAR series X & S-band navigation radars

BRP Suluan (MRRV-4406) is the fifth ship of the Parola-class patrol vessels of the Philippine Coast Guard.

== Design and features ==
The Philippine Coast Guard clarified that the ship is a law enforcement vessel and is designed to conduct environmental and humanitarian missions, as well as maritime security operations and patrol missions.

The ship was designed with a bulletproof navigation bridge, and is equipped with fire monitors, night vision capability, a work boat, and radio direction finder capability.

The ship will be equipped with communications and radio monitoring equipment from Rohde & Schwarz, specifically the M3SR Series 4400 and Series 4100 software-defined communication radios, and DDF205 radio monitoring equipment. These equipment enhances the ship's reconnaissance, pursuit and communications capabilities.

== Construction, delivery and commissioning ==
BRP Suluan underwent sea trials since June 2017 until it was delivered. On 7 August 2017, Philippine Coast Guard formally received the ship at a ceremony held on Philippine Coast Guard headquarters in Manila.

She was commissioned into service on November 21, 2017, together with the BRP Capones (MRRV-4404) and BRP Sindangan (MRRV-4407).

== Service history ==
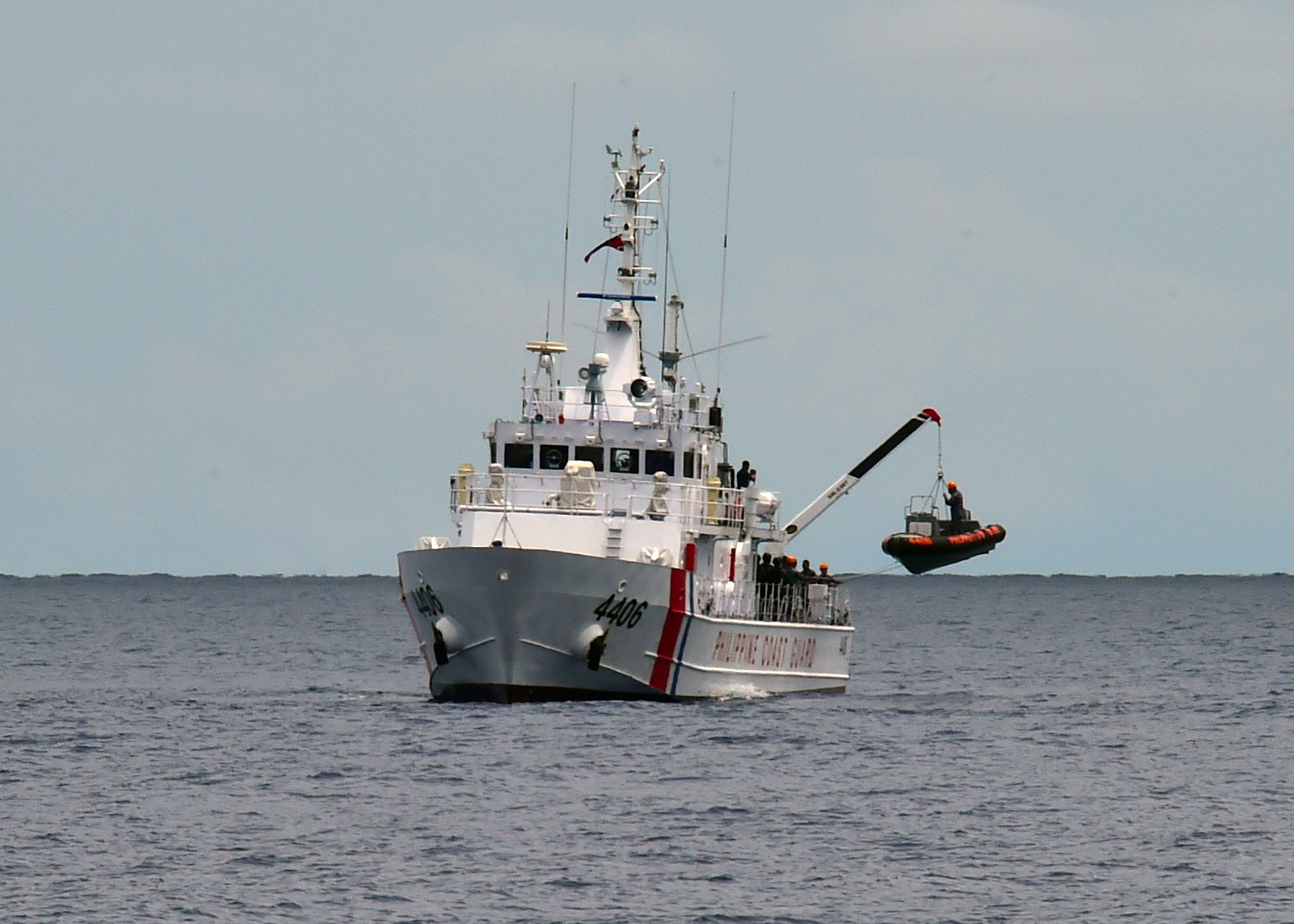
BRP Suluan during sea phase of SEACAT 2018 Exercise.

=== 2017 ===
BRP Suluan participated in the field training phase of SEACAT 2017 Exercise.

=== 2018 ===
In November 2018, the BRP Suluan participated in a joint anti-piracy drill with the Japan Coast Guard ship Echigo (PLH-08) and PCG ships the BRP Boracay (2401) and BRP Panglao (2402). The drill was held in Manila Bay and featured the mock hijacking of a vessel and arrest of the perpetrators aboard the ship.

=== 2025 ===
On August 11, 2025, the BRP Suluan, along with BRP Teresa Magbanua, accompanied the M/V Pamamalakaya to conduct the “Kadiwa Para sa Bagong Bayaning Mangingisda (KBBM)” initiative in Bajo de Masinloc. During the operation, Filipino vessels and fishermen encountered hazardous maneuvers and blocking actions from China Coast Guard and People's Liberation Army Navy vessels in the vicinity. In particular, the BRP Suluan was targeted with a water cannon by a Type 056 corvette, the CCG 3104 (formerly known as the CNS Ningde), but the seamanship skills by BRP Suluan crew members allowed the vessel to successfully avoid being hit.

China Coast Guard 3104 chasing Philippine Coast Guard BRP Suluan with water cannon before T-boning the side of PLA Navy 164 in Bajo de Masinloc

In a Facebook post, Philippine Coast Guard spokesperson for the West Philippine Sea, Commodore Jay Tarriela, said the collision between CCG 3104 and Type 052D destroyer CNS Guilin happened while the former was chasing BRP Suluan at high speed. “CCG 3104 performed a risky maneuver from the PCG vessel's starboard quarter, leading to the impact with the PLA Navy warship. This resulted in substantial damage to the CCG vessel's forecastle, rendering it unseaworthy,” Tarriela said. Following the collision, the BRP Suluan personnel, along with BRP Teresa Magbanua, issued a radio call offering assistance but received no response. Forty-two crew members of BRP Suluan earned the Coast Guard Bronze Cross Medal and Ribbon, while the commanding officer of BRP Suluan, Captain Jomark Angue, earned the Coast Guard Distinguished Service Medal and Ribbon.
