= Sabina Shoal =

Atoll of Spratly Islands in South China Sea

Disputed atoll
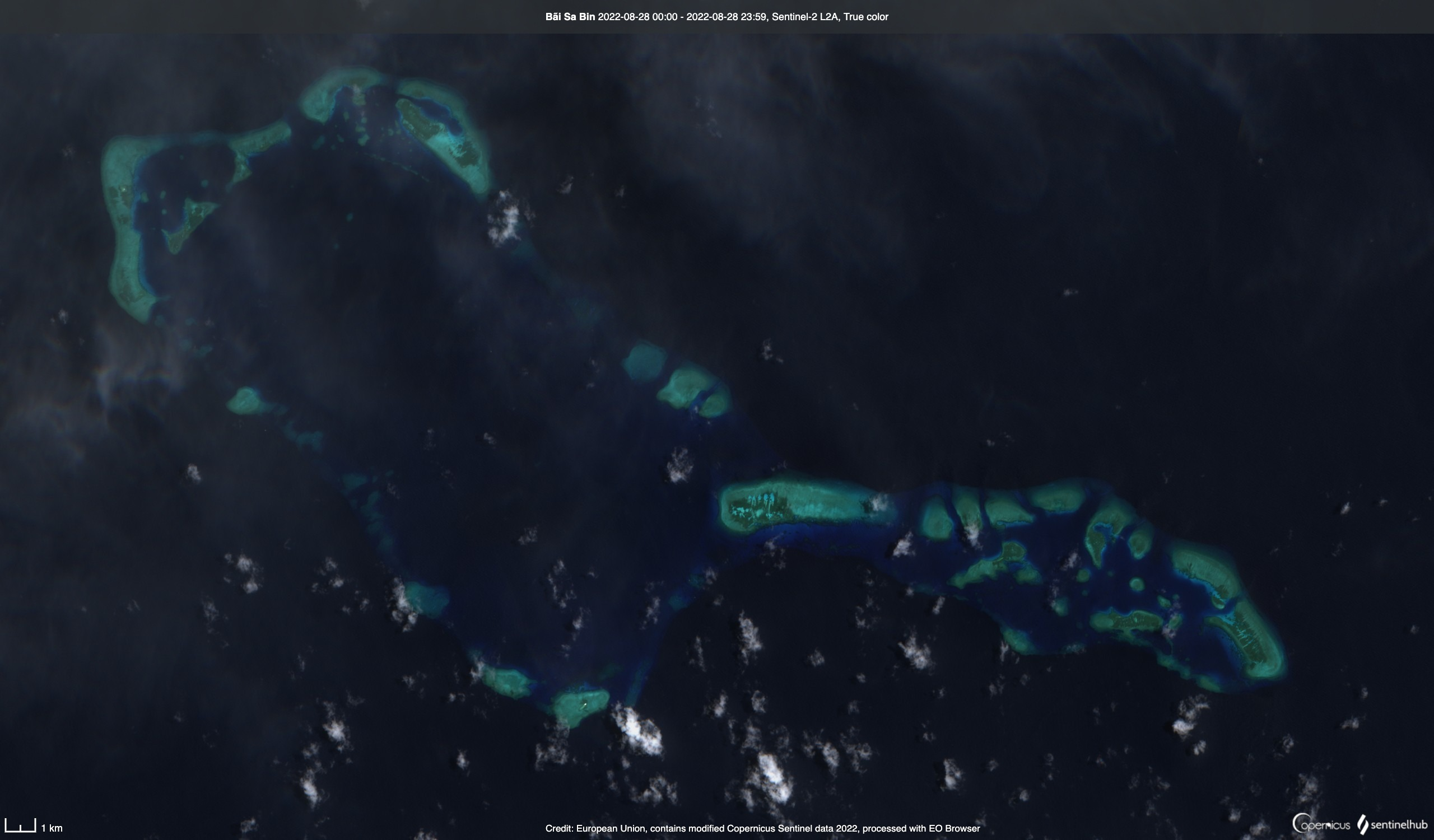
- Sabina Shoal

- Location within Spratly Islands
- Other names: Bãi Sa Bin (Vietnamese); Buhanginan ng Escoda (Filipino); Escoda Shoal (Philippine English) 仙賓礁 / 仙宾礁 Xiānbīn Jiāo (Chinese)

Geography
- Location: South China Sea
- Coordinates: 9°45′N 116°28′E
- Archipelago: Spratly Islands

Claimed by
- China
- Philippines
- Taiwan
- Vietnam

Sabina Shoal, also known as Bãi Sa Bin (Vietnamese: Bãi Sa Bin); Escoda Shoal (Filipino: Buhanginan ng Escoda); Xianbin Jiao (Chinese: 仙賓礁/仙宾礁; pinyin: Xiānbīn Jiāo), is a disputed low-tide elevation atoll located in the northeast of Dangerous Ground in the Spratly Islands, South China Sea.

It is claimed by China, the Philippines, Taiwan and Vietnam. These countries claim the Spratly Islands either in part or their entirety.

The shoal lies within the exclusive economic zone of the Philippines. The EEZ itself does not grant the actual sovereignty except certain exclusive rights and jurisdictions to the Philippines under UNCLOS.

== Other names ==
The US BGN Advisory Committee on Undersea Features (ACUF) database also documents other names as French: Banc Sabina, Malay: Beting Sabina and alternative Chinese names as Hsien-pin An-sha, Xianbin Ansha, Yulin, 仙濱暗沙, 鱼鳞.

== Geography ==
Sabina Shoal is part of the Spratly Islands in the South China Sea. It lies in position 09° 45' N 116° 28' E, 75 nautical miles (139 km; 86 mi) from Palawan Island and lies within the 200-nautical-mile (370 km; 230 mi) exclusive economic zone (EEZ) of the Philippines. It is situated 56 nautical miles (104 km; 64 mi) southwest of Carnatic Shoal, with two main parts and an area of 115 square kilometres (44 mi^{2}).

The eastern half of Sabina Shoal consists of reefs awash, while the western half consists of banks 3.7 to 8.3 metres (12 to 27 feet) deep, and reefs enclosing a lagoon.

== Sovereignty and sovereign rights ==
Maritime Zones under International Law

Sabina Shoal is a disputed low-tide elevation in the Spratly Islands which is claimed by multiple states: China, the Philippines, Taiwan and Vietnam. As a low-tide elevation that is not within the territorial sea of a littoral state, Sabina Shoal itself does not generate any territorial sea of its own per Article 13 of the United Nations Convention on the Law of the Sea (UNCLOS).

There is a distinction between sovereignty and sovereign rights according to international maritime law. Determining sovereignty of disputed features is beyond the jurisdiction of UNCLOS according to Professor Robert Beckman of Nanyang Technological University. The 2016 South China Sea Arbitration by the arbitral tribunal at Permanent Court of Arbitration in The Hague stated that it was not empowered to address the question of sovereignty over the Spratly Islands. The ruling did address specific issues brought to it which included where the Philippines' sovereign rights in its exclusive economic zone had been breached by others. While Sabina Shoal was not specifically mentioned in the 2016 PCA ruling, the ruling was a landmark decision which affirmed the rights of the Philippines over the waters surrounding the shoal.

The Philippines as the coastal state has the sovereign rights to explore, manage, and conserve the natural resources of the sea within its EEZ according to UNCLOS. It also has jurisdiction on "the establishment and use of artificial islands, installations and structures; marine scientific research; and the protection and preservation of the marine environment" according to the same.

While China does not claim all waters within its nine-dash line as its internal waters and territorial sea, its actions near Sabina Shoal, has resulted in commentators implying this applies. The 2016 arbitral tribunal ruled that China has no legal basis for claims of historic rights with respect to maritime area (surrounding sea area) claims within its nine-dash line. China rejected the ruling as "ill-founded", and said its territorial sovereignty and marine rights in South China Sea would not be affected by the ruling.

== Incidents ==
In 1995, soon after occupying Mischief Reef, China (PRC) installed three buoys near Sabina Shoal. They were confiscated by the Philippines.

On April 27, 2021, during a joint maritime patrol operations of the Philippine Coast Guard (PCG) and Bureau of Fisheries and Aquatic Resources (BFAR) in the area, seven Chinese maritime militia vessels were spotted anchored at the atoll. After several challenges from BRP Cabra of the PCG, the militia vessels left the area.

Alleging reclamation activities by China, the PCG stationed the BRP Teresa Magbanua at Sabina Shoal in April 2024. China responded by deploying its 12,000-tonne (13,000-short-ton), 165-metre (541 ft) Coast Guard ship which is nicknamed "The Monster" because of its size.

On the Independence Day of the Philippines in 2024, Rear Admiral Armando Balilo of the PCG, aboard BRP Teresa Magbanua in that part of the South China Sea called by the Philippines the West Philippine Sea, held a flag-raising ceremony claiming Sabina Shoal for the Philippines. China responded with a vow to take "strong measures" against the Philippines.

Up to 71 Coast Guard ships and other vessels from China were seen at Sabina Shoal from August 27 to September 2, 2024.

=== Ramming incidents ===
On August 19, 2024, Philippine Coast Guard vessels BRP Cape Engaño along with the BRP Bagacay suffered damage after being rammed by China Coast Guard (CCG) ships off Sabina Shoal. Bagacay suffered a 3-foot (0.91 m) hole above the waterline. A 60 Minutes crew with journalist Cecilia Vega were on board the Cape Engaño when it was surrounded by 14 Chinese Coast Guard and Maritime Militia ships and rammed at 4 am by a CCG vessel. The ramming tore a 1.1-metre (3 1/2 ft) hole above the waterline on the Cape Engaño.

China Coast Guard vessel 21555 turning and ramming BRP Datu Sanday on August 25, 2024, near Sabina Shoal

The day after a clash between the two coast guards near the shoal on August 19, 2024, the Philippine government stated it was examining expanding the provisional agreement that had been established to de-escalate tensions near the Second Thomas Shoal to other areas.

On August 25, 2024, the Philippine Bureau of Fisheries and Aquatic Resources (BFAR) vessel BRP Datu Sanday was surrounded by at least 8 Chinese vessels including the People's Liberation Army Navy (PLAN) ship 626, multiple China Coast Guard cutters, and two tugboats. Philippine officials said the Datu Sanday was on a "humanitarian mission"; the vessel is traditionally used to resupply fishing crews. It was rammed and suffered engine failure after being doused by water cannons from the Chinese vessels. China Coast Guard spokesperson Gan Yu accused the Philippine vessel of intentionally colliding with their ship, but a video released by the Philippine Coast Guard showed the Chinese Coast Guard vessel 21555 ramming the Datu Sanday.

China Coast Guard vessel 5205 ramming BRP Teresa Magbanua on August 31, 2024, in Sabina Shoal

On August 31, 2024, PCG Commodore Jay Tarriela said China Coast Guard vessel 5205 rammed the port bow of the PCG patrol ship BRP Teresa Magbanua, then turned around and struck its starboard quarter, turned around once more and struck its port bow again. Tarriela released video footage of the incident showing the damage to the Philippine ship, including a man-sized hole on the freeboard, as well as dents, deformed railings, and waterlogged equipment. China Coast Guard said it was conducting enforcement against the Teresa Magbanua in "China's Xianbin Reef" and despite warnings "the Philippine ship 9701 deliberately collided with the Chinese ship 5205."

The United States, Japan, Taiwan, Australia, and the European Union condemned China's actions of repeatedly ramming the Teresa Magbanua, demanding that China stop its aggression. This was the fifth incident since the breakdown of a June provisional agreement between China and the Philippines.

On September 15 the Teresa Magbanua arrived at the Philippines with four soldiers suffering from dehydration due to China's prolonged blockade attempt. China said it may tow the Philippine vessel away if it is anchored at the Sabina Shoal again, although such an attempt can be challenging due to Teresa Magbanua's size and the risk of drawing the United States into the conflict.

== Environmental destruction ==
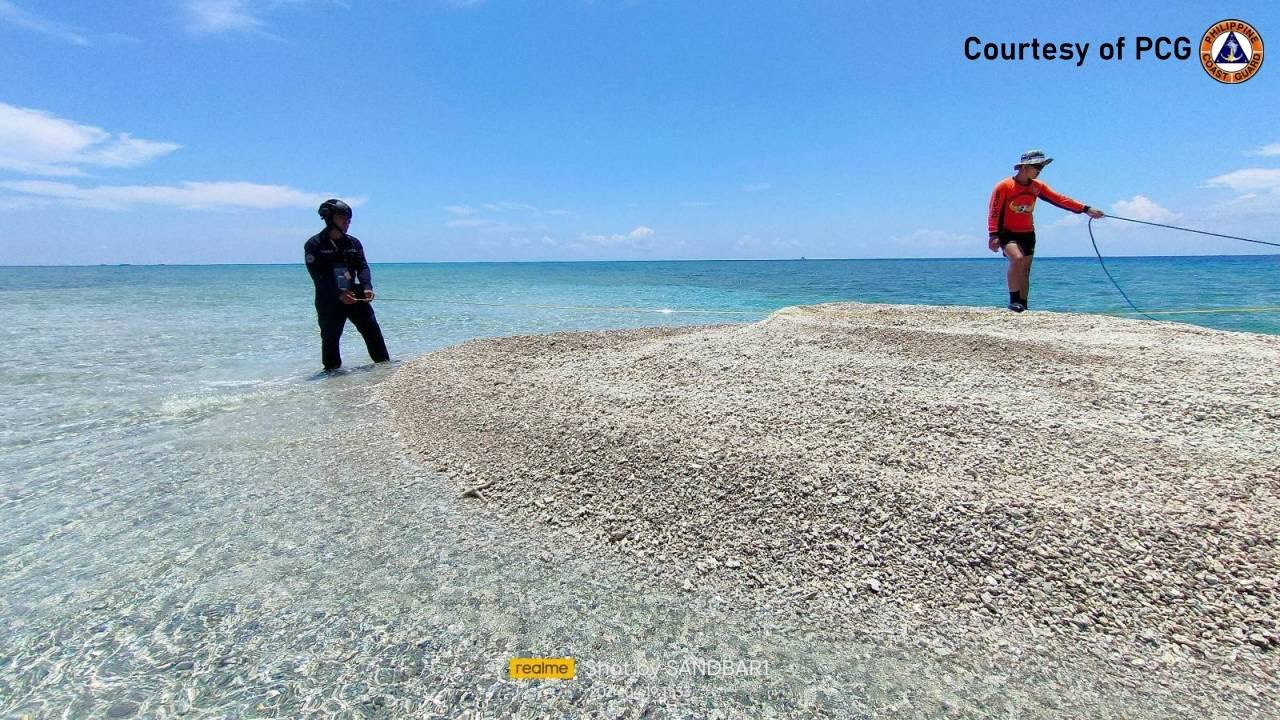
Philippine Coast Guard examining crushed dead corals dumped in Sabina Shoal

In September 2023, the Philippine Coast Guard reported "massive damage" to the marine environment and coral reef in Sabina Shoal. It suggested that the destruction may have been the result of dumping, illegal fishing, and land reclamation efforts (also known as China's Great Wall of Sand) by the Chinese maritime militia.

China said there was no scientific or factual basis for the claims made by the Philippines. It claimed that the PCG ship (BRP Teresa Magbanua) which had been anchored at the shoal in April 2024 had caused continuous damage to the surrounding natural environment.
