= BRP Cabra =

Naval ship for the Philippine Coast Guard

History

Philippines
- Name: BRP Cabra
- Namesake: Cabra Island Lighthouse located in Cabra Island, Lubang, Occidental Mindoro
- Ordered: 29 May 2015
- Builder: Japan Marine United, Yokohama, Japan
- Completed: January 2018
- Identification: IMO number: 9809497; MMSI number: 548909500; Callsign: 4DFS3; Hull number: MRRV-4409
- Status: In Active Service

General characteristics
- Class & type: Parola-class patrol vessel
- Length: 44.5 m (146 ft)
- Beam: 7.5 m (25 ft)
- Draft: 4 m (4.0 m)
- Propulsion: 2 × MTU 12V4000M93L 12-cylinder diesel engines, Total diesel engine output: 3,460 shp (2,580 kW)
- Speed: Maximum @ 25 knots (46 km/h), cruising 15 knots (28 km/h)
- Range: 1,500 nautical miles (2,800 km)
- Boats & landing craft carried: 1 × RHIB work boat
- Complement: 25 (5 officers, 20 enlisted)
- Sensors & processing systems: Furuno FAR series X & S-band navigation radars

BRP Cabra (MRRV-4409) is the eighth ship of the Parola-class patrol vessels of the Philippine Coast Guard.

== Design and features ==
The Philippine Coast Guard clarified that the ship is a law enforcement vessel and is designed to conduct environmental and humanitarian missions, as well as maritime security operations and patrol missions.

The ship was designed with a bulletproof navigation bridge, and is equipped with fire monitors, night vision capability, a work boat, and radio direction finder capability.

The ship will be equipped with communications and radio monitoring equipment from Rohde & Schwarz, specifically the M3SR Series 4400 and Series 4100 software-defined communication radios, and DDF205 radio monitoring equipment. These equipment enhance the ship's reconnaissance, pursuit and communications capabilities.

== Construction, delivery and commissioning ==
BRP Cabra underwent sea trials in Yokohama, Japan and was commissioned into service on March 28, 2018, together with the BRP Cape San Agustin (MRRV-4408).

== Operational history ==
In April 2018, the BRP Cabra was sent to Boracay in Caticlan to conduct Maritime Patrols around the island for the duration of its six-month closure that started on April 26, 2018.

In September 2018, the BRP Cabra along with its sister ship the BRP Sindangan (MRRV-4407) and the Philippine Navy vessels BRP Nestor Reinoso (PG-380) and BRP Benguet (LS-507) secured the BRP Gregorio del Pilar (FF-15), which ended up being grounded at the Hasa-Hasa Shoal (also known as the Half Moon Shoal) in the South China Sea. The BRP Gregorio del Pilar was eventually pulled out from the shoal a couple of days later.
