= BRP Cape San Agustin =

2018 Philippine Coast Guard patrol vessel

History

Philippines
- Name: BRP Cape San Agustin
- Namesake: Cape San Agustin Lighthouse located in Lavigan, Governor Generoso, Davao Oriental
- Ordered: 29 May 2015
- Builder: Japan Marine United, Yokohama, Japan
- Completed: October 2017
- Identification: IMO number: 9809485; MMSI number: 548171500; Callsign: 4DFR4; Hull number: MRRV-4408
- Status: Active

General characteristics
- Class & type: Parola-class patrol vessel
- Length: 44.5 m (146 ft)
- Beam: 7.5 m (25 ft)
- Draft: 4 m (4.0 m)
- Propulsion: 2 × MTU 12V4000M93L 12-cylinder diesel engines, Total diesel engine output: 3,460 shp (2,580 kW)
- Speed: Maximum @ 25 knots (46 km/h), cruising 15 knots (28 km/h)
- Range: 1,500 nautical miles (2,800 km)
- Boats & landing craft carried: 1 × RHIB work boat
- Complement: 25 (5 officers, 20 enlisted)
- Sensors & processing systems: Furuno FAR series X & S-band navigation radars

BRP Cape San Agustin (MRRV-4408) is the seventh ship of the Parola-class patrol vessels of the Philippine Coast Guard.

== Design and features ==
The Philippine Coast Guard clarified that the ship is a law enforcement vessel and is designed to conduct environmental and humanitarian missions, as well as maritime security operations and patrol missions.

The ship was designed with a bulletproof navigation bridge, and is equipped with fire monitors, night vision capability, a work boat, and radio direction finder capability.

The ship will be equipped with communications and radio monitoring equipment from Rohde & Schwarz, specifically the M3SR Series 4400 and Series 4100 software-defined communication radios, and DDF205 radio monitoring equipment. These equipment enhances the ship's reconnaissance, pursuit and communications capabilities.

== Construction, delivery and commissioning ==
BRP Cape San Agustin underwent fitting out and sea trials in October 2017. It sailed home to Manila Bay on the last week of February 2018 and arrived safely on March 2, 2018. She was commissioned into service on March 28, 2018 together with the BRP Cabra (MRRV-4409).

== Service history ==
In mid August 2018, the BRP Cape San Agustin together with the BRP Malabrigo (MRRV-4402) found and rescued the wooden-hulled vessel M/L Sabrina carrying 13 people near Mapun Island in Tawi-Tawi. The rescued ship which was later towed to port was travelling from Malaysia with a cargo of sugar when it encountered mechanical trouble and started drifting at sea.

In late August 2018, the ship was on routine patrol when it intercepted two wooden-hulled vessels, the M/L Overseas and M/L Nadeepa, which were carrying smuggled food products worth at least ₱33 million in the vicinity of Tamuk Island, Basilan. The M/L Overseas was loaded with 10,000 sacks of rice of 25 kilos each, refined sugar, and 1,000 boxes of noodles while the M/L Nadeepa was loaded with 12,000 bags of rice of 25 kilos each. The two vessels were later escorted to Zamboanga City and turned over to the Bureau of Customs (BOC).

In November 2018, the BRP Cape San Agustin made a series of successful interceptions of smuggled rice in Sulu and Basilan. First was the discovery of 4,000 sacks of rice worth Php 8 million onboard the R/J Express which was flagged during a routine patrol off the coast of Maluso, Basilan. A couple of days later the ship found the partly abandoned M/V Hulk anchored off coast of Buland Island in Sulu with 50,000 sacks (each weighing 25 kilos) of rice worth Php 50 million also without proper documentation.

In January 2019, the ship rescued three fishermen who had been drifting in the Celebes Sea near the Maritime Border of the Philippines and Indonesia for 12 days. The fishermen left Tawi-Tawi in late December 2018 when their motorboat's engine quit and ended up being beyond repair. A foreign vessel later spotted them and sent a distress signal to the Philippine Coast Guard.
