= BRP Malabrigo =

Philippine Coast Guard patrol vessel

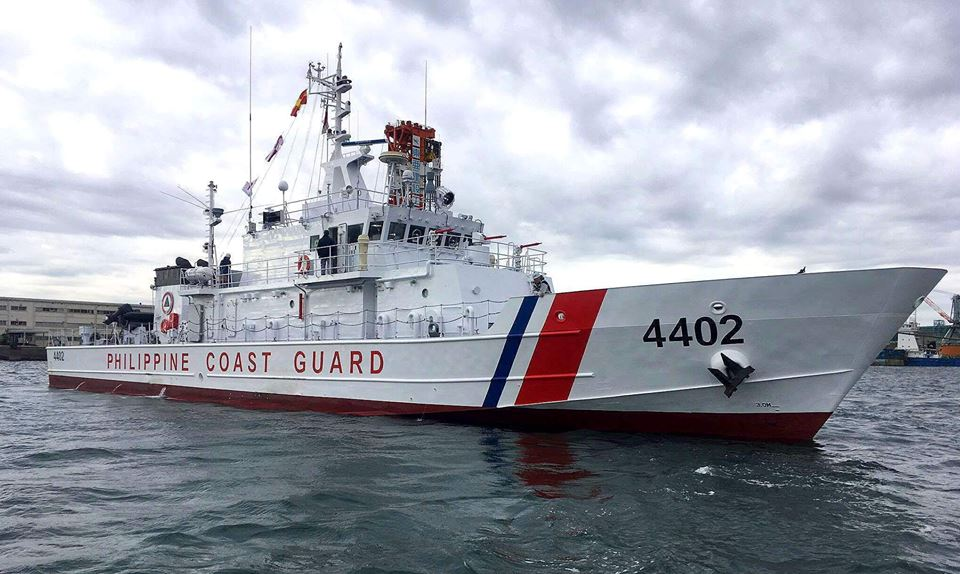
- BRP Malabrigo (MRRV-4402) prior to delivery from Japan to the Philippines

History

Philippines
- Name: BRP Malabrigo
- Namesake: Lighthouse Malabrigo located in Lobo, Batangas
- Ordered: 29 May 2015
- Builder: Japan Marine United, Yokohama, Japan
- Laid down: 13 May 2016
- Launched: 4 October 2016
- Completed: November 2016
- Commissioned: 22 December 2016
- Identification: IMO number: 9809423; MMSI number: 548135500; Callsign: 4DFM5; Hull number: MRRV-4402
- Status: in active service

General characteristics
- Class & type: Parola-class patrol vessel
- Length: 44.5 m (146 ft)
- Beam: 7.5 m (25 ft)
- Draft: 4 m (4.0 m)
- Propulsion: 2 × MTU 12V4000M93L 12-cylinder diesel engines, Total diesel engine output: 3,460 shp (2,580 kW)
- Speed: Maximum @ 25 knots (46 km/h), cruising 15 knots (28 km/h)
- Range: 1,500 nautical miles (2,800 km)
- Boats & landing craft carried: 1 × RHIB work boat
- Complement: 25 (5 officers, 20 enlisted)
- Sensors & processing systems: Furuno FAR series X & S-band navigation radars

BRP Malabrigo (MRRV-4402) is the second ship of the Parola-class patrol vessels of the Philippine Coast Guard.

== Design and features ==
The Philippine Coast Guard clarified that the ship is a law enforcement vessel and is designed to conduct environmental and humanitarian missions, as well as maritime security operations and patrol missions.

The ship was designed with a bulletproof navigation bridge, and is equipped with fire monitors, night vision capability, a work boat, and radio direction finder capability.

The ship will be equipped with communications and radio monitoring equipment from Rohde & Schwarz, specifically the M3SR Series 4400 and Series 4100 software-defined communication radios, and DDF205 radio monitoring equipment. These equipment enhances the ship's reconnaissance, pursuit and communications capabilities.

== Construction, delivery & Commissioning ==
The ship's keel was officially laid down on May 13, 2016, and the ship was launched on October 4, 2016. Then the ship started sea trials starting in June 2016 until before its delivery.

The ship left Yokohama, Japan on December 2, 2016, and arrived in the Port of Manila on December 8, 2016.

BRP Malabrigo was commissioned during a commissioning ceremony held at Philippine Coast Guard headquarters in Manila on December 22, 2016, with LCDR Geronimo B. Tuvilla being her first commanding officer. The ceremony was attended by the Undersecretary for Maritime Sector of the Department of Transportation Felipe A. Judan and Japan International Cooperation Agency Chief Representative Susumo Ito etc.

== Service history ==
In April 2018, the BRP Malabrigo rescued a crew of the Chinese vessel MV China Peace named Zheng Le after he suffered an Epilepsy attack while the ship was transiting the waters near Laparan Island in Pangutaran, Sulu. The BRP Malabrigo transported to Zamboanga City for treatment.

In August 2018, the BRP Malabrigo together with the BRP Cape San Agustin (MRRV-4408) found and rescued the wooden-hulled vessel M/L Sabrina carrying 13 people near Mapun Island in Tawi-Tawi. The rescued ship which was later towed to port was travelling from Malaysia with a cargo of Sugar when it encountered mechanical trouble and started drifting at sea.

== Gallery ==
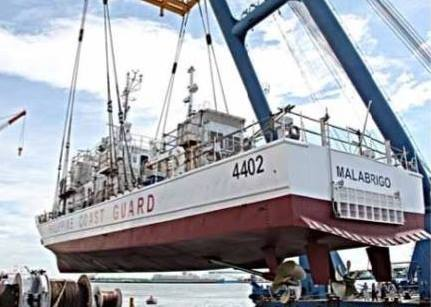
BRP Malabrigo being launched at Japan Marine United's shipyard in Yokohama, Japan.

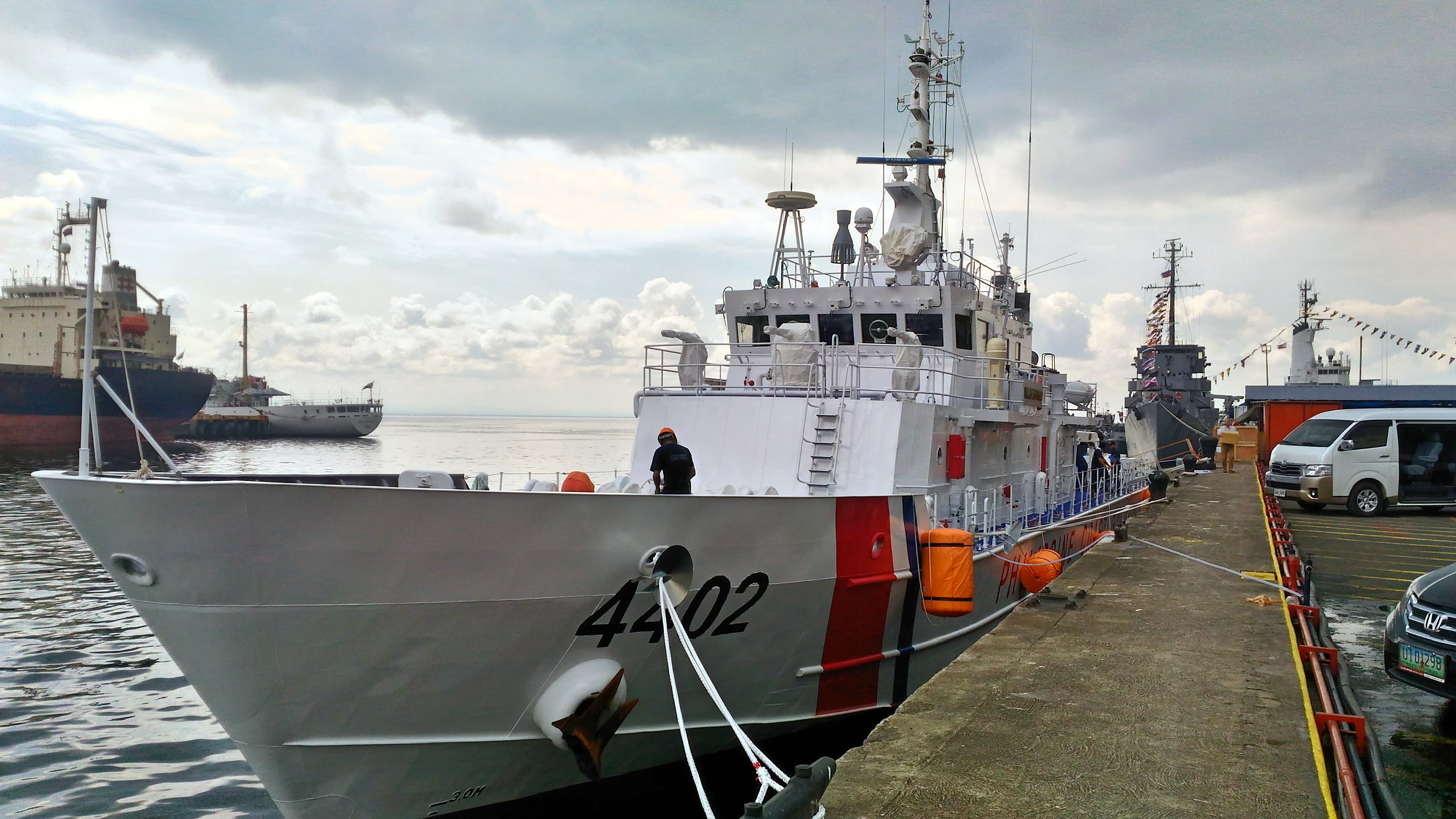
A front view of the BRP Malabrigo while docked in port.

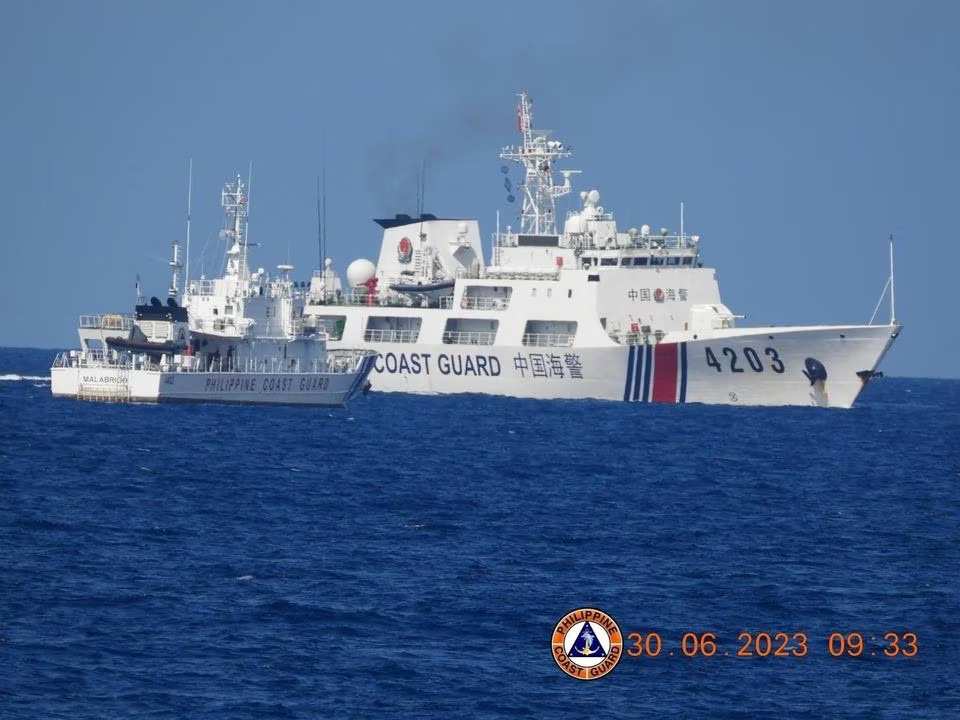
BRP Malabrigo (left) in an encounter with China Coast Guard ship No. 4203 (right) at Second Thomas Shoal. June 2023.
