= Fish finder =

Fish finder may refer to:

- Fishfinder, a sonar device attached to a boat, used to measure the amount of fish at various depths underneath the boat
- Fish identifier, an identification key used in fishing to identify the species of a caught fish
