= BRP Benguet =

Philippine Navy landing ship

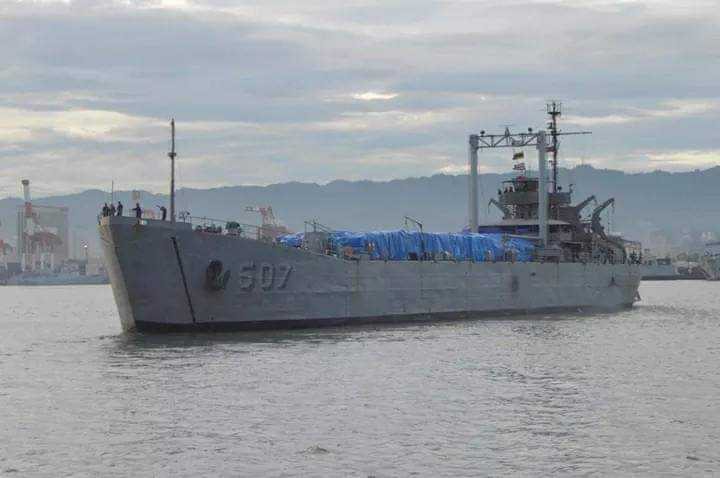
- BRP Benguet departing at Captain Veloso Pier

History

United States
- Name: USS LST-692
- Builder: Jeffersonville Boat & Machine Company, Jeffersonville, Indiana
- Laid down: 7 February 1944
- Launched: 31 March 1944
- Commissioned: 10 May 1944
- Decommissioned: 1946
- Recommissioned: 1951
- Renamed: USS Daviess County (LST-689), 1 July 1955
- Namesake: Daviess County
- Stricken: 1 June 1964
- Honours and awards: 1 battle star (World War II); 2 battle stars (Korea)
- Fate: Transferred to the Philippines, 13 September 1976

Philippines
- Name: BRP Benguet (LS-507)
- Namesake: Province of Benguet
- Operator: Philippine Navy
- Acquired: 13 September 1976
- Renamed: BRP Benguet (LT-507) – until April 2016; BRP Benguet (LS-507) – from April 2016
- Status: In active service

General characteristics
- Class & type: LST-542-class tank landing ship
- Displacement: 1,780 long tons (1,809 t) light; 3,640 long tons (3,698 t) full
- Length: 328 ft (100 m)
- Beam: 50 ft (15 m)
- Draft: Unloaded : 2 ft 4 in (0.71 m) forward; 7 ft 6 in (2.29 m) aft; Loaded : 8 ft 2 in (2.49 m) forward; 14 ft 1 in (4.29 m) aft
- Propulsion: 2 × General Motors 12-567 diesel engines, two shafts, twin rudders
- Speed: 12 knots (22 km/h; 14 mph)
- Boats & landing craft carried: 2 LCVPs
- Troops: Approximately 140 officers and enlisted men
- Complement: 8-10 officers, 100-115 enlisted men
- Armament: 1 × single 3"/50 caliber gun mount; 8 × 40 mm guns; 12 × 20 mm guns

BRP Benguet (LS-507) is a LST-542-class tank landing ship, currently serving the Philippine Navy.

Formerly known as USS Daviess County (LST-692), it was an LST-542-class tank landing ship built for the United States Navy during World War II. Named after counties in Indiana, Kentucky, and Missouri, she was the only U.S. Naval vessel to bear the name. She served in World War II and during the Korean War. The US Government transferred Daviess County to the Philippine Navy in 1976, which renamed her BRP Benguet (LT-507). A new classification system implemented in April 2016 changed her hull number from LT-507 to LS-507.

== Service history ==
=== United States service ===
LST-692 was laid down on 7 February 1944 at Jeffersonville, Indiana, by the Jeffersonville Boat & Machine Company; launched on 31 March 1944; sponsored by Mrs. Alma D. Voelker; and commissioned on 10 May 1944.

During World War II, LST-692 was assigned to the European Theater and participated in the invasion of southern France in August and September, 1944. Decommissioned in 1946, she was placed in the reserve fleet at Green Cove Springs, Florida until reactivated in 1951. She performed active service during the Korean War and thereafter. LST-692 was redesignated USS Daviess County (LST-692) on 1 July 1955.

LST-692 earned one battle star for World War II service and two battle stars for Korean service.

Daviess County was struck from the Naval Vessel Register on 1 June 1964 and transferred to the Military Sea Transportation Service (MSTS) where she operated as T-LST-692.

=== Philippine service ===
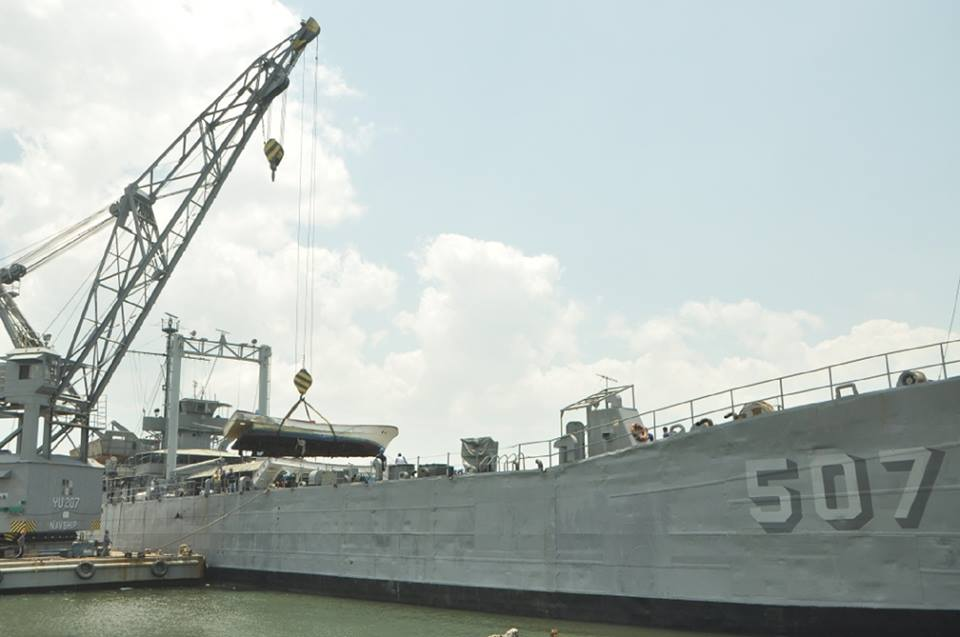
LT-507 with YU-207

The US Government transferred Daviess County to the Philippine Navy on 13 September 1976, which renamed her to BRP Benguet (LT-507). In 1999, the Philippines stationed Benguet on Scarborough Shoal. China then urged the Philippines to remove her, and the Philippines immediately replied that it would do so. However, the Philippines only removed BRP Benguet from Scarborough Shoal shortly before the official visit of Chinese Premier Zhu Rongji to Manila. After that removal she went aground again on Thitu Island in 2004, but was removed again and still serves the Philippine Navy today.

In September 2018, the BRP Benguet along with the BRP Sindangan (MRRV-4407), BRP Cabra (MRRV-4409) and BRP Nestor Reinoso (PG-380) secured and assisted the BRP Gregorio del Pilar (FF-15) which ended up being grounded at the Half Moon Shoal in the South China Sea. The BRP Gregorio del Pilar was eventually pulled out from the shoal a couple of days later.
