= BRP Nestor Reinoso =

History

Philippines
- Name: BRP Nestor Reinoso (PC-380)
- Operator: Philippine Navy
- Ordered: March 1993
- Builder: Trinity-Equitable Shipyards, New Orleans, USA
- Acquired: 1 February 1995
- Commissioned: 1 June 1995
- Reclassified: April 2016: from PG-380 to PC-380
- Status: in active service

General characteristics
- Class & type: Jose Andrada class
- Type: Coastal Patrol Craft
- Displacement: 56.4 tons full load
- Length: 78 ft (24 m)
- Beam: 20 ft (6.1 m)
- Draft: 5.8 ft (1.8 m)
- Propulsion: 2 × 1,400 bhp Detroit 16V-92TA Diesel Engines (Note: All sources refer to the same engine, although with different horsepower rating. But official specs from manufacturer indicates a 1,400 hp rating for each engine.); 2 × 35-kW Diesel generators; 2 shafts
- Speed: 28 knots (52 km/h) maximum
- Range: 1,200 nmi (2,200 km) at 12 knots (22 km/h)
- Boats & landing craft carried: 4-meter rigid inflatable boat at aft
- Complement: 12
- Sensors & processing systems: Raytheon AN/SPS-64(V)11 Navigation / Surface Search Radar
- Armament: 1 × Mk.38 Mod.0 Bushmaster 25mm chain gun; 4 × Mk.26 M2HB Browning 12.7 mm/50-cal. GP machine guns; 2 × M60 7.62 mm/30-cal. GP machine guns

BRP Nestor Reinoso (PC-380) is the tenth ship of the Jose Andrada class coastal patrol boats of the Philippine Navy. It is part of the second batch of its class ordered through US Foreign Military Sales (FMS) in 1993, and was commissioned with the Philippine Navy on 1 June 1995.

It was initially designated as Fast Patrol Craft, and was numbered "DF-380", but later on was re-designated as a Patrol Gunboat, and was finally re-numbered as "PG-380". Another round of reclassification was made in April 2016, which redesignated the patrol gunboat as the coastal patrol craft "PC-380".

== Technical details ==
The ship was built to US Coast Guard standards with aluminium hull and superstructure. She is powered by two Detroit Diesel 16V-92TA Diesel Engines with a combined power of around 2,800 hp driving two propellers for a maximum speed of 28 knots (52 km/h). Maximum range is 1,200 nmi (2,200 km) at 12 knots (22 km/h), or alternatively 600 nmi (1,100 km) at 24 knots (44 km/h).

The ship originally designed to carry one bow Mk.3 40 mm gun, one 81 mm mortar aft, and four 12.7 mm/50 calibre machine guns. Instead, she is armed with one 25mm Bushmaster chain gun on Mk.38 Mod.0 mount, four M2HB Browning 12.7 mm/50 caliber machine guns on Mk.26 mounts, with two positioned forward and two aft; and two M60 7.62 mm/30 caliber machine guns, both mounted amidships. The ship can carry 4,000 rounds of 12.7 mm and 2,000 rounds of 7.62 mm A large "Big Eyes" binocular is also carried on tripod mounts, one on the forecastle and one just above the mast.

As part of the second batch (PG-379 to PG-395), it is equipped with Mk.38 Mod.0 M242 Bushmaster 25mm chain gun that the first batch of ships do not carry.

She is equipped with a Raytheon AN/SPS-64(V)11 surface search and navigation radar but with a smaller antenna as those used in bigger Philippine Navy ships. Like all other Philippine Navy ship, she was installed with the Philippine Navy Vessel Tracking System (VTS) by the Naval Sea Systems Command.

A 4-meter rigid inflatable boat powered by a 40-hp outboard motor is stowed amidships.

== Operational history ==
In March 2018, the BRP Nestor Reinoso provided assistance to the P/Y Atlantis Asorez, a yacht with about 20 foreign guests southeast off Tubbataha Reef off the coast of Palawan. While on routine patrol, the Patrol Craft was informed that one of the Asorez's passengers suffered an injury and required medical evacuation upon which the BRP Reinoso obliged. The injured passenger was safely brought to the nearest hospital upon reaching shore.

In August 2018, the BRP Nestor Reinoso made two rescues in Palawan, the first was when it responded to a distress call and rescued 28 passengers from the Athan Uno which ended up being half submerged after being hit by strong waves on its way to do fishing in the West Philippine Sea (WPS). All of the passengers were delivered safely later to El Nido.

Just a couple of days later, the Tourist Boat M/B Cleopatra was on its way to Bacuit Bay for a Private Tour when it broke its bow due to strong waves when it was spotted by the BRP Nestor Reinoso which subsequently towed the ship to El Nido after transferring its 10 passengers to other boats which assisted in the rescue.

In September 2018, the BRP Nestor Reinoso along with the BRP Sindangan (MRRV-4407), BRP Cabra (MRRV-4409) and BRP Benguet (LS-507) secured and assisted the BRP Gregorio del Pilar (FF-15) which ended up being grounded at the Hasa-Hasa Shoal (also known as the Half Moon Shoal) in the South China Sea. The BRP Gregorio del Pilar was eventually pulled out from the shoal a couple of days later.
