= Fishfinder =

Sonar instrument used to detect aquatic animals and the bottom and measure their depth

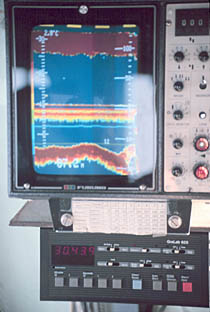
Fathometer sonar

A fishfinder or sounder (Australia) is a sonar instrument used on boats to identify aquatic animals, underwater topography and other objects by detecting reflected pulses of sound energy, usually during fishing activities. A modern fishfinder displays measurements of reflected sound on a graphical display, allowing an operator to interpret information to locate schools of fish, underwater debris and snags, and the bottom of a body of water. Fishfinder instruments are used both by recreational and commercial fishermen, as well as by marine biologists. Modern electronics allow a high degree of integration between the fishfinder system, marine radar, compass and GPS navigation systems.

== Fathometer ==
Fishfinders were derived from fathometers, active sonar instruments used for navigation and safety to determine the depth of water. The fathom is a unit of water depth, from which the instrument gets its name. The fathometer is an echo sounding system for measurement of water depth. A fathometer will display water depth and can make an automatic permanent record of measurements. Since both fathometers and fishfinders work the same way, and use similar frequencies and can detect both the bottom and fish, the instruments have merged.

== Operating theory ==
In operation, an electrical impulse from a transmitter is converted into a sound wave by an underwater transducer, called a hydrophone, and sent into the water. When the wave strikes something such as a fish, it is reflected back and displays size, composition, and shape of the object. The exact extent of what can be discerned depends on the frequency and power of the pulse transmitted. Knowing the speed of the wave in the water, the distance to the object that reflected the wave can be determined. The speed of sound through the water column depends on the temperature, salinity and pressure (depth). This is approximately c = 1404.85 + 4.618T - 0.0523T^{2} + 1.25S + 0.017D (where c = sound speed (m/s), T = temperature (degrees Celsius), S = salinity (per mille) and D = depth). Typical values used by commercial fish finders are 4921 ft/s (1500 m/s) in seawater and 4800 ft/s (1463 m/s) in freshwater.

The process can be repeated up to 40 times per second and eventually results in the bottom of the ocean being displayed versus time (the fathometer function that eventually spawned the sporting use of fishfinding).

The temperature and pressure sensitivity capability of fishfinder units allow one to identify the exact location of the fish in the water by the use of a temperature gauge. Many modern fishfinders also have track-back capabilities to check changes in movement in order to switch position and location whilst fishing.

It is easy to get more detail on screen when the fishfinder's frequency is high. Deep-sea trawlers and commercial fishermen normally use low frequency (50–200 kHz); modern fishfinders have multiple frequencies to view split-screen results.

== General interpretation ==
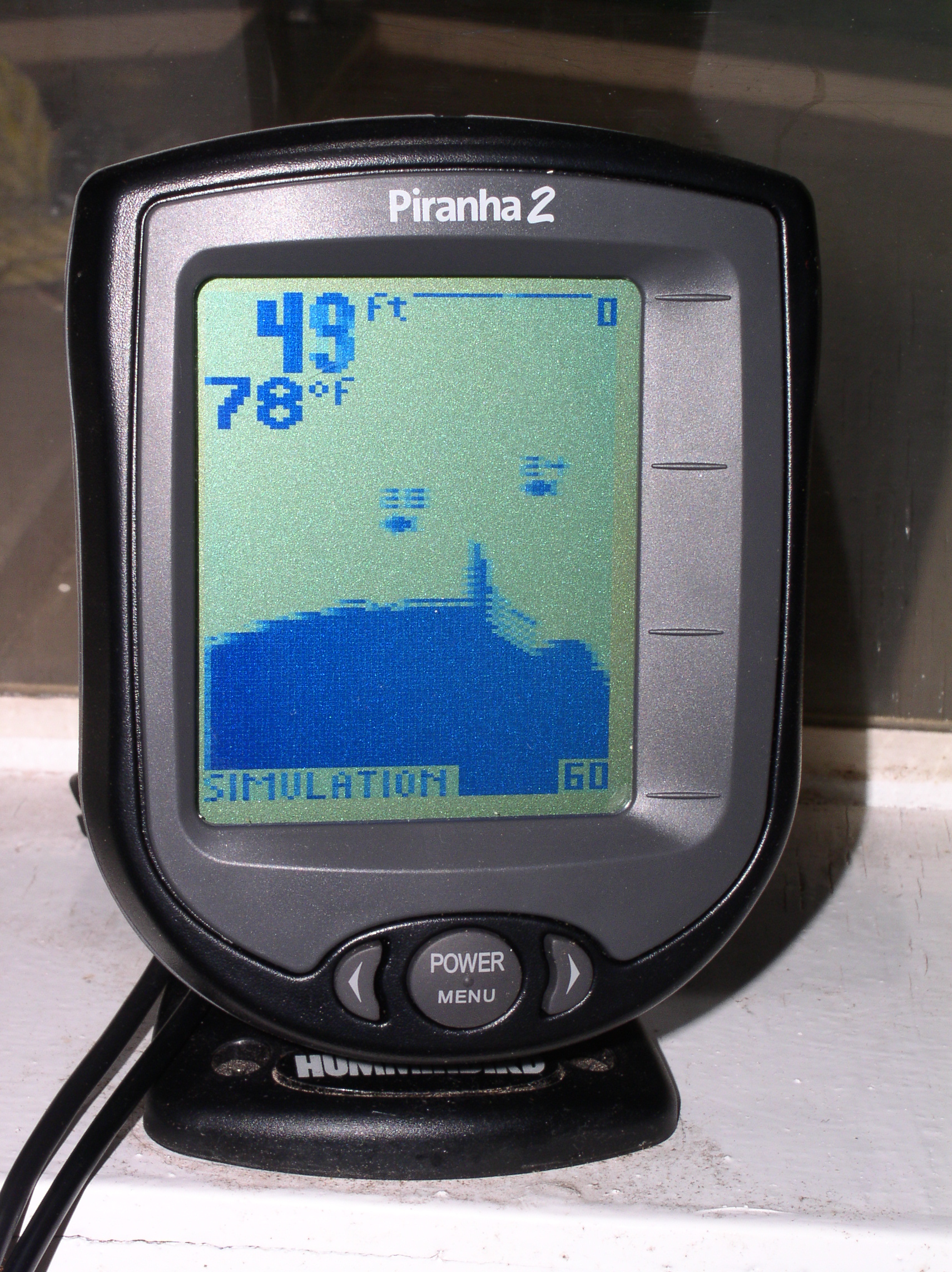
Display of a consumer-type fishfinder

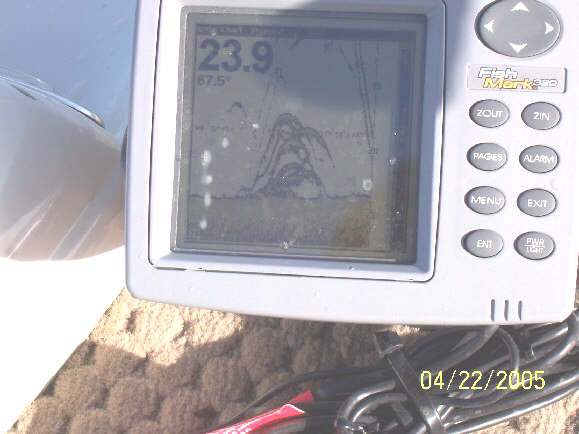
Sonar image of a white bass feeding frenzy

The image above, at right, clearly shows the bottom structure—plants, sediments and hard bottom are discernible on sonar plots of sufficiently high power and appropriate frequency. Slightly more than halfway up from the bottom to the left of the screen centre and about a third away from the left side, this image is also displaying a fish – a light spot just to the right of a 'glare' splash from the camera's flashbulb. The X-axis of the image represents time, oldest (and behind the soundhead) to the left, most recent bottom (and current location) on the right; thus the fish is now well behind the transducer, and the vessel is now passing over a dip in the ocean floor or has just left it behind. The resulting distortion depends on both the speed of the vessel and how often the image is updated by the echo sounder.

== Fish arches ==
With the Fish Symbol feature disabled, an angler can learn to distinguish between fish, vegetation, schools of baitfish or forage fish, debris, etc. Fish will usually appear on the screen as an arch. This is because the distance between the fish and the transducer changes as the boat passes over the fish (or the fish swims under the boat). When the fish enters the leading edge of the sonar beam, a display pixel is turned on. As the fish swims toward the centre of the beam, the distance to the fish decreases, turning on pixels at shallower depths. When the fish swims directly under the transducer, it is closer to the boat so the stronger signal shows a thicker line. As the fish swims away from the transducer, the distance increases, which shows as progressively deeper pixels.

The image to the right shows a school of white bass aggressively feeding on a school of threadfin shad. Note the school of baitfish near the bottom. When threatened, baitfish form a tightly packed school, as the individuals seek safety in the center of the school. This typically looks like an irregularly shaped ball or thumbprint on the fishfinder screen. When no predators are nearby, a school of baitfish frequently appears as a thin horizontal line across the screen, at the depth where the temperature and oxygen levels are optimal. The nearly-vertical lines near the right edge of the screen show the path of fishing lures falling to the bottom.

== History ==
The first fishfinder, i.e. sonar device meant to find underwater fish or schools of fish, was invented in Japan in the 1940s by the Furuno brothers, who were radio repairmen. Building from the knowledge of fishermen who were able to determine the presence of fish, and their number, from bubbles, the Furuno brothers first planned to detect these bubbles with sonar, a new technology at the time. They invented the first through-hull transducer and found they were able to detect the fish themselves. In 1948 they introduced their fishfinder for use in commercial fishing vessels; the Furuno Fish Finder is the world's first practical fishfinder.

The first fishfinder marketed to consumers in America for recreational fishing was the Lowrance Fish Lo-K-Tor (also nicknamed "The Little Green Box"), which was invented in 1957 and entered the market in 1959. It retailed for $150 at the time, equivalent to $1,610 in 2024. Originally the subject of controversy due to its perceived unfair advantage, it faced the potential of being banned by some states but its use was eventually accepted.

By the early 1970s, a common pattern of depth finder used an ultrasonic transducer immersed in water, and an electromechanical readout device. A neon lamp mounted on the end of an arm was rotated around a circular scale at a fixed speed by a small electric motor. The circular scale was calibrated in terms of depth of water. The instrument was arranged to send out a pulse of ultrasonic waves as the lamp passed the zero point of the scale. The transducer was then arranged to detect any reflected ultrasound impulses; the lamp would flash when an echo returned to the transducer, and by its position on the scale would indicate the elapsed time and therefore the depth of the water. These also gave a small flickering flash for echos off of fish. Like today's low-end digital fathometers, they kept no record of the depth over time and provided no information about bottom structure. They had poor accuracy, especially in rough water, and were hard to read in bright light. Despite the limitations, they were still usable for rough estimates of depth, such as for verifying that the boat had not drifted into an unsafe area.

Eventually, CRTs were married with a fathometer for commercial fishing and the fishfinder was born. With the advent of large LCD arrays, the high power requirements of a CRT gave way to the LCD in the early 1990s and fishfinding fathometers reached the sporting markets. Nowadays, many fishfinders available for hobby fishers have color LCD screens, built-in GPS, charting capabilities, and come bundled with transducers. Today, sporting fishfinders lack only the permanent record of the big ship navigational fathometer, and that is available in high end units that can use the ubiquitous computer to store that record as well.

Fishfinders may use higher frequencies to improve the image of underwater objects. Side-looking transducers provide additional visibility of underwater objects on either side of the boat's path.

== Commercial and naval units ==
Commercial and naval fathometers of yesteryear used a strip chart recorder where an advancing roll of paper was marked by a stylus to make a permanent copy of the depth, usually with some means of also recording time (each mark or time 'tic' is proportional to distance traveled) so that the strip charts could be readily compared to navigation charts and maneuvering logs (speed changes). Much of the world's ocean depths have been mapped using such recording strips. Fathometers of this type usually offered multiple (chart advance) speed settings, and sometimes, multiple frequencies as well. In the deep ocean, low frequency carries better, while in shallows, high frequency shows smaller structures—like fish, submerged reefs, wrecks, or other bottom composition features of interest. At high frequency settings, high chart speeds, such fathometers give a picture of the bottom and any intervening large or schooling fish that can be related to position. Fathometers of the constant recording type are still mandated for all large vessels (100+ tons displacement) in restricted waters (i.e. generally, within 15 miles (24 km) of land).

== See also ==
- Bathymetry – Study of underwater depth of lake or ocean floors
- Depth sounding – Measuring the depths of a body of water
- Fessenden oscillator – Type of electro-acoustic transducer
- Sensor – Converter that measures a physical quantity and converts it into a signal
