= Bansaan =

Island in the Philippines

- Location within Philippines

Geography
- Coordinates: 10°13′15″N 124°19′30″E
- Area: 0.844 km^{2} (0.326 sq mi)
- Highest point: 1.5 m (4.9 ft)

Administration
- Philippines
- Province: Sag[*]
- Municipality: Talibon

Bansaan is a boomerang-shaped island located in the off the mid-northern coast of Bohol Island, Philippines. It is part of the municipality of Talibon, Bohol province.

== Geography ==
Bansaan Island is located in the off the mid-northern coast of the main island of Bohol. It is located 7 kilometres (4.3 mi) north of Talibon with an approximate geographic position at latitude 10˚13.0’ to 10˚13.5' and longitude 124˚18.5" to 124˚20.0'. It is accessible by pump boat from Talibon on the mainland of Bohol.

== Physiography ==
Bansaan, a boomerang-shaped island, is composed of raised coral reefs and part of the bigger Calituban reefs, a group of scattered and low-lying reefal islands located off the northwestern coast of Bohol Island. The highest elevation is 1.5 m above sea level.

== Rainfall distribution ==
The island falls under Coronas climate IV, where rainfall is evenly distributed throughout the year. The highest observed average rainfall based from July 1975 to September 1984 records was observed in the month of June [246.3 mm (9.70 in)] and the lowest was in April [15.3 mm (0.60 in)]. The annual average rainfall was 1,136.2 mm (44.73 in).

== Biodiversity ==
=== Fauna ===
A total of 24 species of birds including 14 species of waders and 10 species of terrestrial birds were identified in Bansaan. The counts made during the visits in February and September 1991 confirm the importance of the island as a wintering area and stop over site for the waders during their northward and southward migration. Grey-tailed tattlers (Heteroscelus brevipes), grey plovers (Pluvialis squatarola), whimbrels (Numenius phaeopus), and common redshanks (Tringa totanus) constitute the largest numbers recorded.

A total of 35 species of marine mollusks were reported including 28 species of gastropods and 7 species of bivalves. Apparently all those species are edible, and are also used as raw materials in the shellcraft industry.

The preliminary entomological survey of Bansaan Island revealed a total of 16 species representing 6 orders and 16 families of insects. Of the 16 species, Order Diptera comprises the largest number of families. Orders Lepidoptera and Orthoptera ranked second with 3 families each, followed by Order Coleoptera having 2 families and the last were Orders Hemiptera and Hymenoptera with only one family each.

Leafminers, leaf beetles, loopers and leaftiers are pests on mangrove trees: Pongamia pinnata, Osbornia octodonta, Terminalia catappa, Excoecaria agallocha, Sonneratia caseolaris, and Lumnitzera littorea. Meadow grasshoppers, mole crickets, ants, and long-horned grasshoppers were found attacking some terrestrial plants and grasses.

Some insects were found to be pests to human. These include mosquitoes, houseflies, and small dungflies.

== Soil composition ==
Beach sand and hydrosol are the dominant soil types of the island. Both soil types are characterized by high pH values with high amounts of soluble salts and exchangeable sodium which resulted to high salinity and electrical conductivity as well as base saturation of nearly 100%. Moreover, it was noted that most of the soils are coarse textured.

== Geology ==
The whole island is composed of white coralline sands derived from the weathering of coral reefs. Based on the paleontological analyses of three selected samples, it showed a list of known microfossils identified as common in nearshore or shallow environment, typical in coral reef areas. Geological assessment of the island showed no mineral deposits worthy of exploitation.
