= Furuno =

Japanese marine electronics company

Furuno Electric Co., Ltd.
- Native name: 古野電気株式会社
- Type: Public KK
- Traded as: TYO: 6814
- Industry: Electronics
- Founded: Nagasaki (1948; 78 years ago)
- Founder: Kiyotaka Furuno
- Headquarters: 9-52 Ashihara-cho, Nishinomiya, Hyōgo Prefecture 662-8580, Japan
- Key people: Yukio Furuno (President)
- Products: Marine electronics; Medical equipment; Meteorological instrumentation
- Revenue: ▼US$ 700 million (FY 2017) (JPY 78.67 billion) (FY 2017)
- Net income: ▲US$ 11.5 million (FY 2017) (JPY 13 billion) (FY 2017)
- Number of employees: 2,836 (consolidated, as of February 28, 2014)
- Website: furuno.co.jp

Furuno Electric Co., Ltd. (古野電気株式会社, Furuno Denki Kabushiki-gaisha) (commonly known as Furuno) is a Japanese electronics company whose main products are marine electronics, including marine radar systems, fish finders, and navigational instruments. The company also manufactures global positioning systems and medical equipment, and entered the weather radar market in 2013.

== History ==
Furuno Electric Shokai was founded in Nagasaki, Japan in 1948. The same year, Furuno commercialized the world's first practical fish finder. Manufacturing continued to ramp up as the decade came to a close, and by the mid-1950s, Furuno was producing various Marine supplements, such as early examples of commercial Marine radars. In 1973, Furuno created an early iteration of satellite positioning receivers for vessels at sea. Later that decade, Furuno entered the United States market, establishing an HQ in the United States as Furuno USA. Following this expansion and continued growth, Furuno continued expanding their marine-based radar products. In 2009, Furuno acquired San Francisco based eRide, Inc., a fabless semiconductor company. Following this acquisition, in 2013, Furuno introduced an X-band weather radar, the smallest of its kind. In 2015, the company's GNSS Receiver Modules were used in radio controlled flying quadcopters.

== In popular culture ==
Furuno's marine electronic devices has been featured in Licence to Kill (1989) as product placement.

== Gallery ==
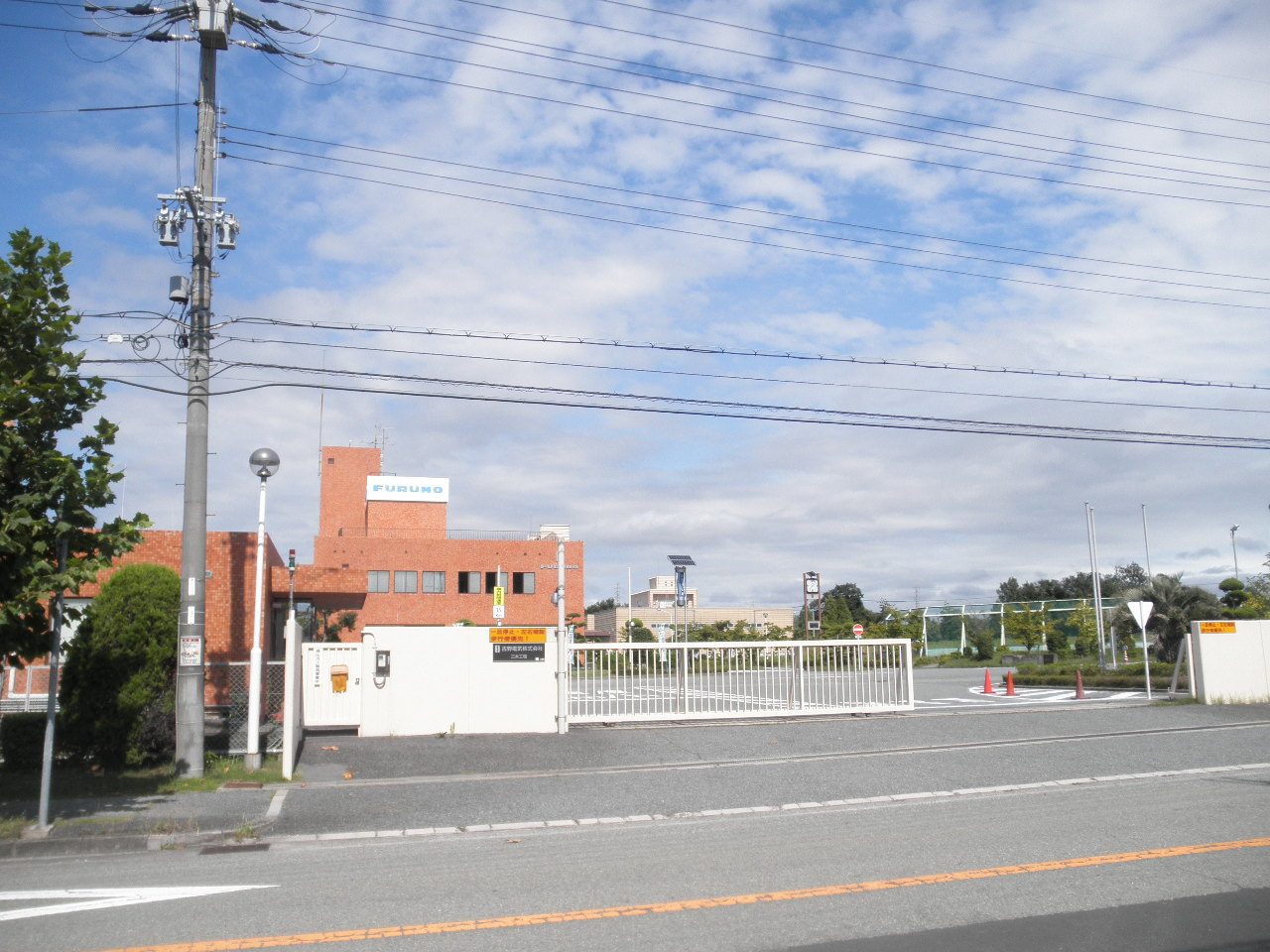
The Furuno factory in Miki city

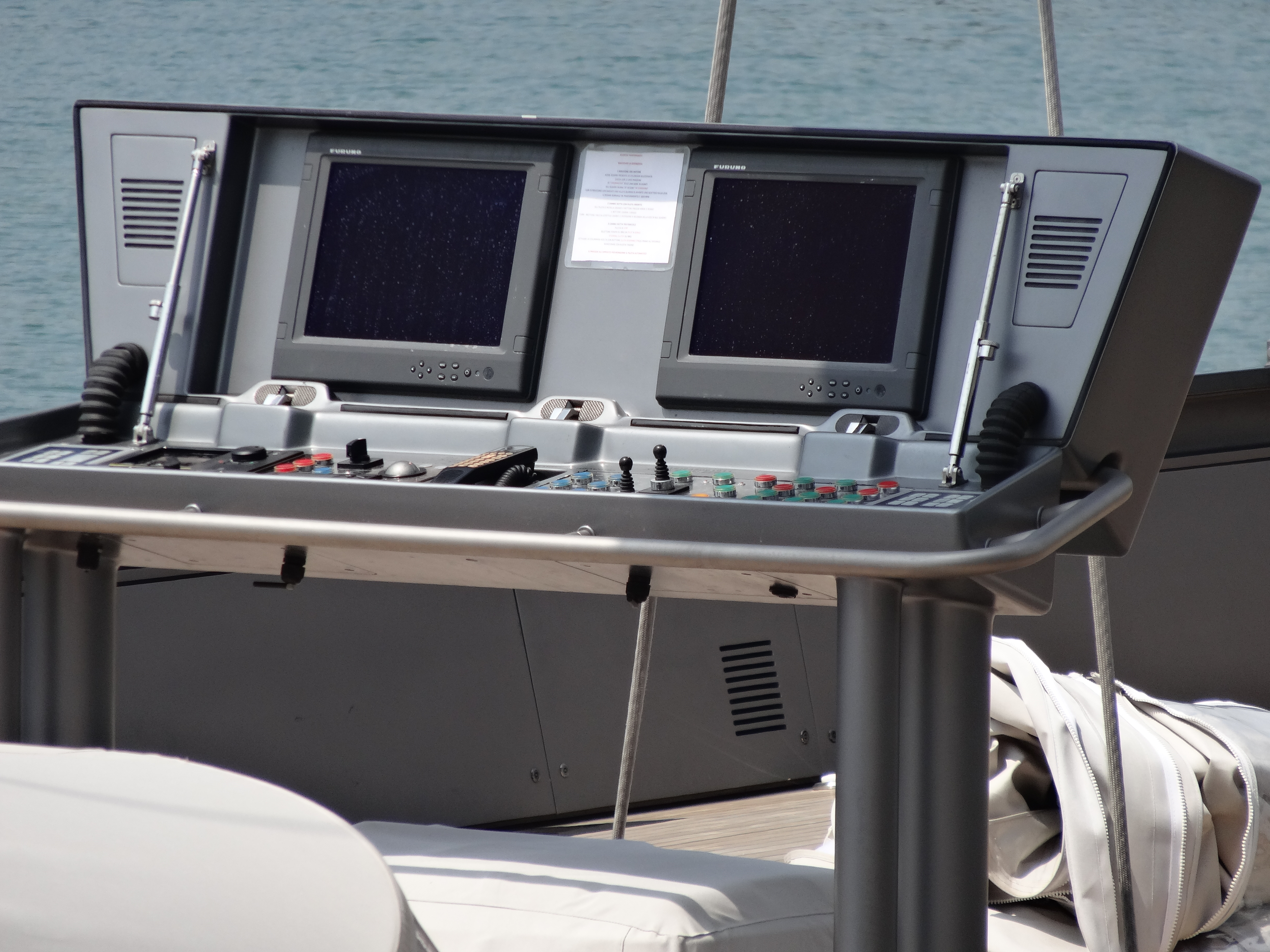
Furuno control panels on a ship

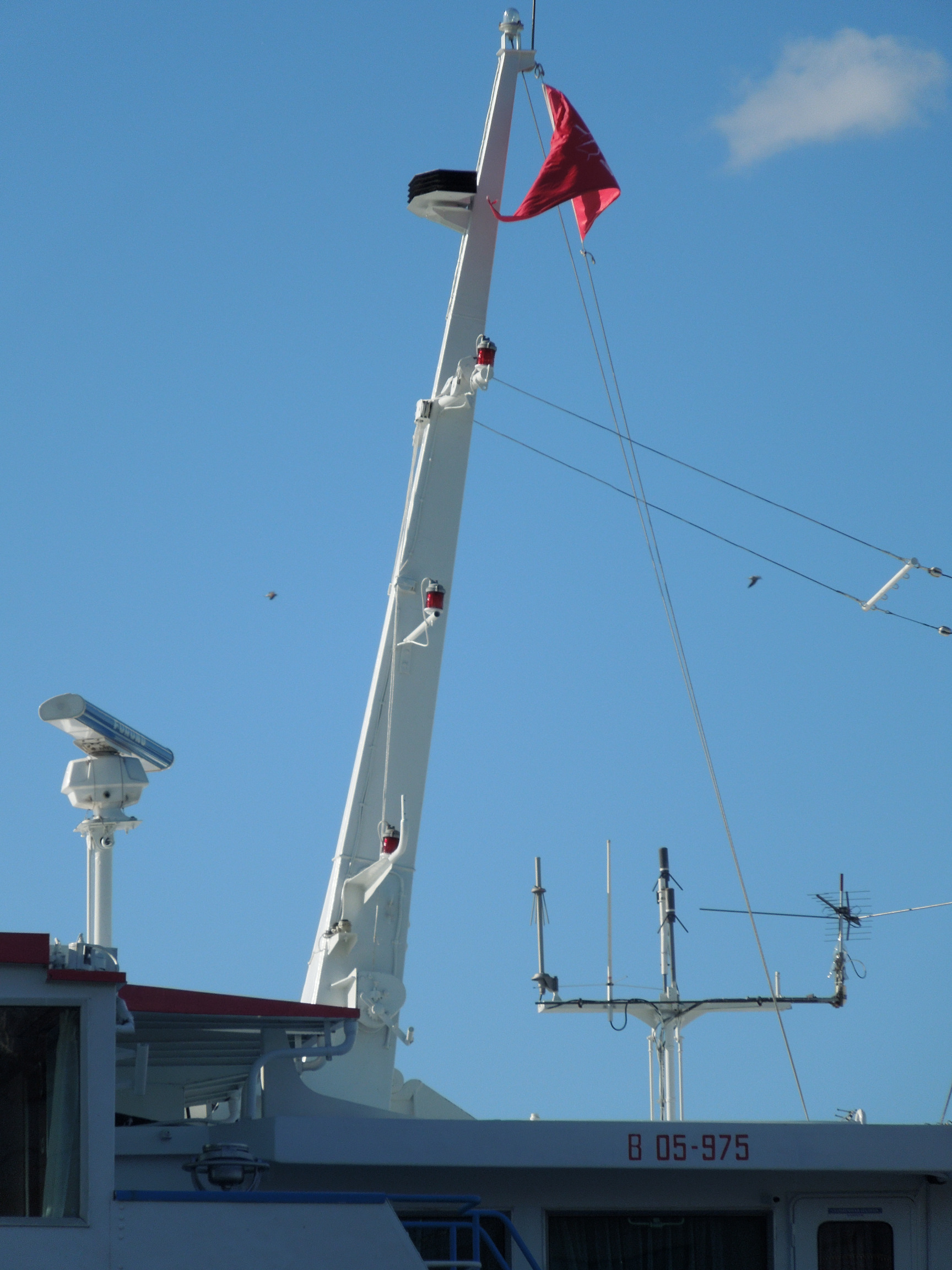
A Furuno marine radar on a ship (visible on the left)

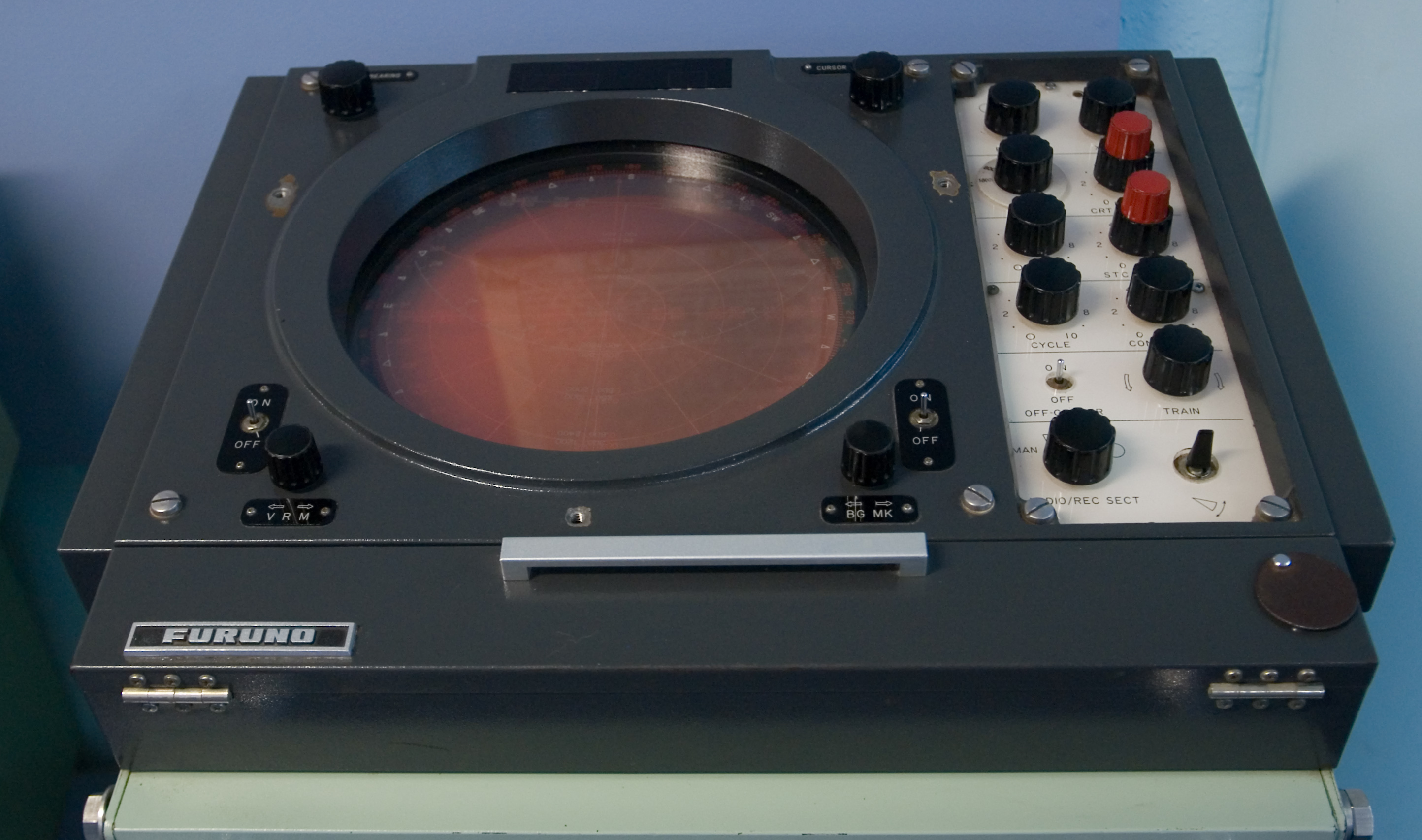
An old model of sonar made by the company

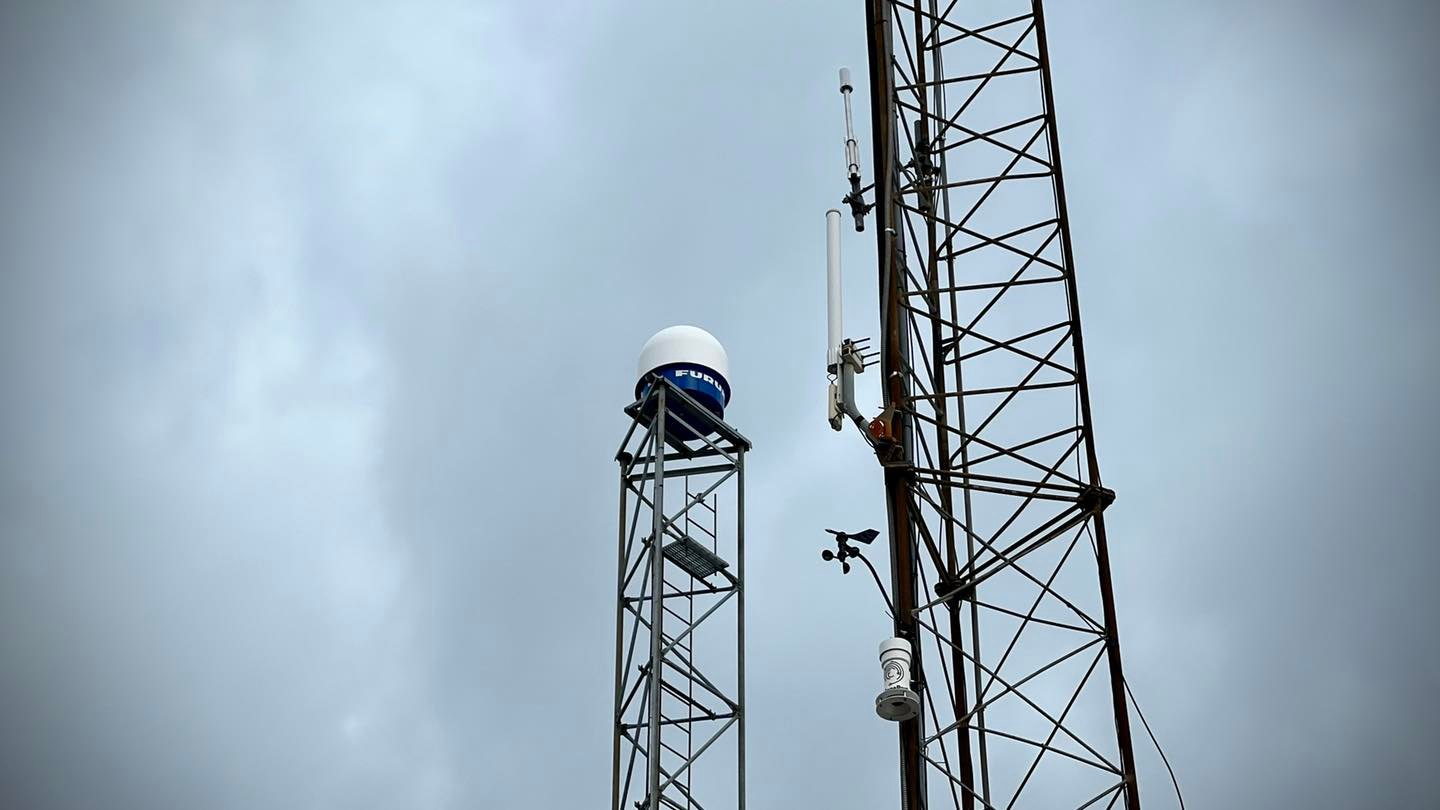
A Furuno Doppler Weather Radar
