= Japan Marine United =

Japanese ship builder

Japan Marine United Corporation ジャパン マリンユナイテッド株式会社

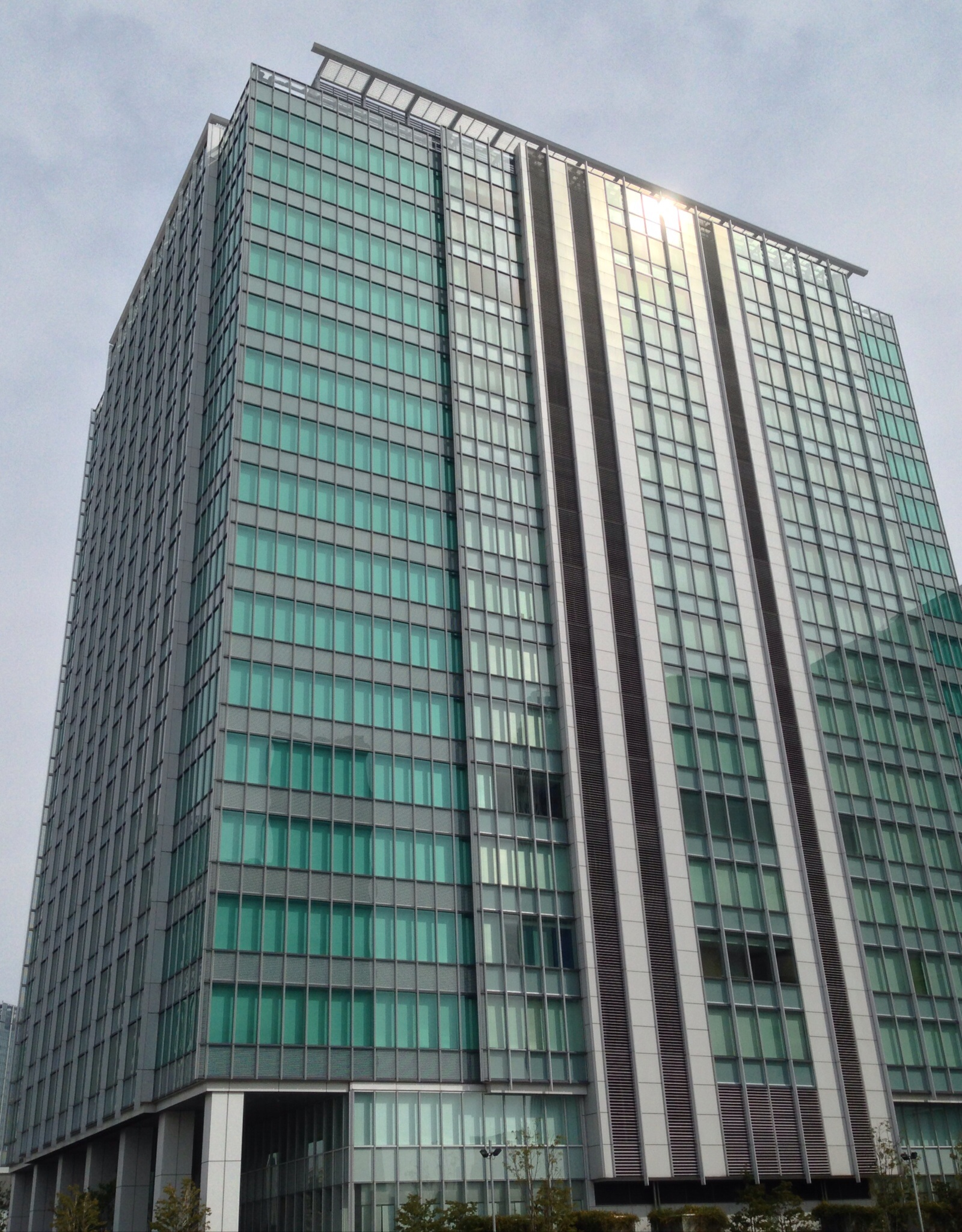
- Headquarters Yokohama Blue Avenue
- Type: Public KK
- Industry: Shipbuilding
- Founded: 2013
- Headquarters: Yokohama, Kanagawa, Japan
- Area served: Global
- Key people: Kotaro Chiba (President and CEO); Yoshio Otagaki (Representative Director)
- Parent: JFE Holdings: 35% IHI Corporation: 35% Imabari Shipbuilding: 30%
- Divisions: Merchant Ship; Naval Ship; Offshore & Engineering; Ship Life Cycle
- Website: www.jmuc.co.jp

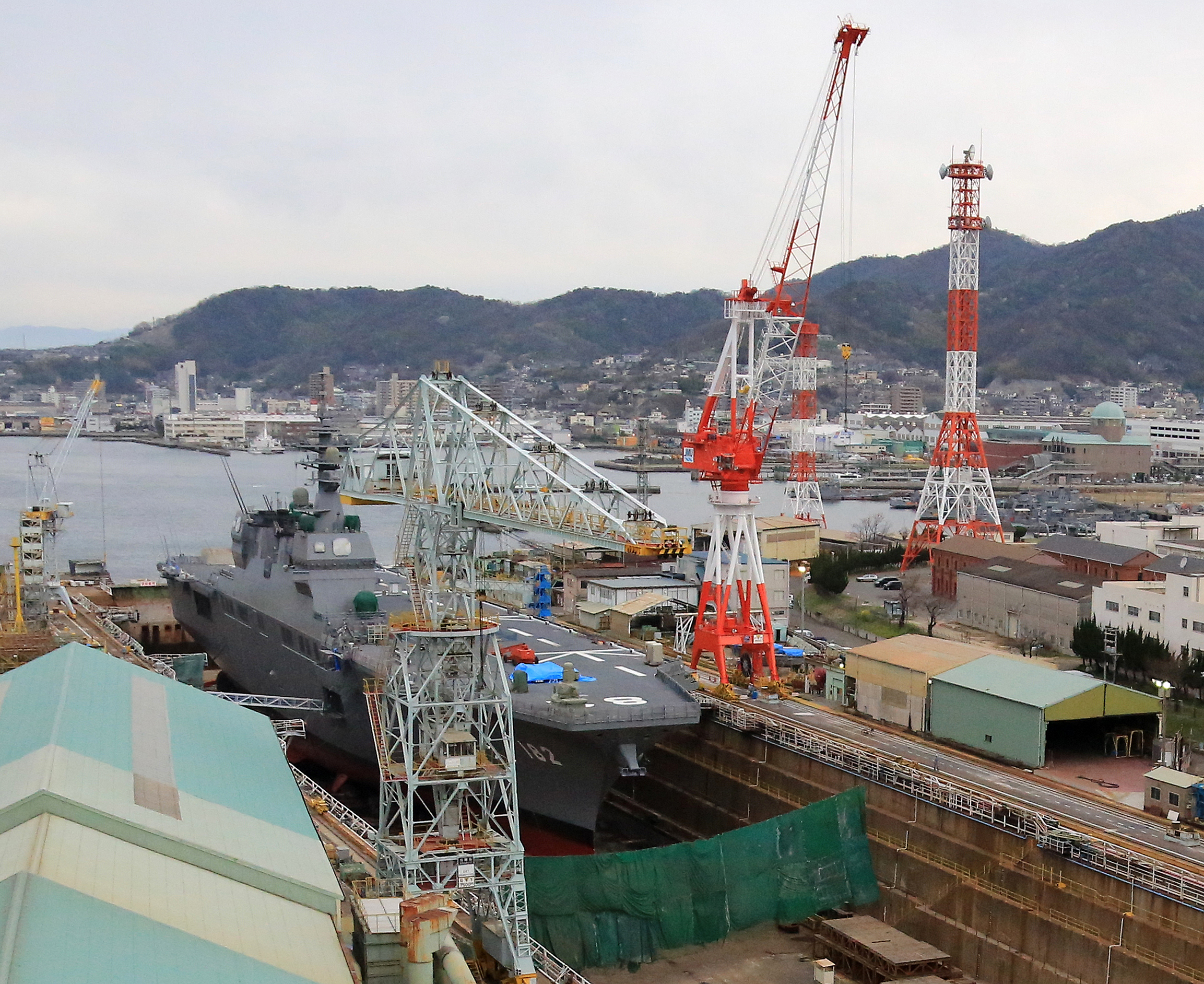
JDS Ise (DDH-182) at JMU's Dry Dock No.4, Kure, Hiroshima

Japan Marine United Corporation (ジャパン マリンユナイテッド株式会社, Japan Marine United Kabushiki-kaisha) (informally JMU) is a Japanese ship building marine engineering and service company headquartered in Yokohama, Japan.

It's Japan's second largest shipbuilder after Imabari Shipbuilding, with shipyard facilities in Kure, Hiroshima, Yokohama, Nagasu, Kumamoto, Maizuru, Kyoto and Mie prefectures.

JMU's products include the design, manufacture, purchase and sale of both merchant and naval ships, offshore engineering and ship life cycle services.

== History ==
Osaka Iron Works (Hitachi Zosen) established in 1881. Nippon Kokan (NKK) established by Asano zaibatsu in 1912. Both united and became Universal Shipbuilding Corporation in 2002.

Ishikawajima Shipyard established in 1853. Uraga Dock (Sumitomo Heavy Industries) established in 1893. Both united and became IHI Marine United in 2002, part of Ishikawajima-Harima Heavy Industries Co., Ltd., later renamed IHI Corporation

Universal Shipbuilding Corporation and IHI Marine United Inc. united and became Japan Marine United in 2013.

On January 1, 2021, JMU (with 49% of shares) merged into a new joint venture with Imabari Shipbuilding (with 51% of shares) named Nihon Shipyard covering all ship types except LNG carriers, which are designed and sold by MI LNG Company, established as a joint venture of Mitsubishi Heavy Industries and Imabari Shipbuilding. In parallel, Imabari Shipbuilding bought 30% of JMU's shares. The cooperation between these two Japanese companies make it one of the largest marine engineering and shipbuilding company in the world. Nihon Shipyard designs, builds and promotes zero-emission vessels.

== Vessels ==
=== Japan Maritime Self-Defense Force ===
- Izumo-class destroyer
- Maya-class destroyer
- Awaji-class minesweeper
- Sakura-class patrol ship
- New FFM (upgraded Mogami-class frigate)
