= China–Philippines relations =

- China: Philippines

Diplomatic mission
- Chinese Embassy, Makati: Philippine Embassy, Beijing

Envoy
- Ambassador Jing Quan: Ambassador Jaime FlorCruz

Diplomatic relations between the People's Republic of China and the Philippines were established in June 1975. Relations became closer during the Philippine presidencies of Gloria Macapagal Arroyo and Rodrigo Duterte. However, they became more strained due to territorial disputes in the South China Sea, particularly following the 2012 Scarborough Shoal standoff, after which China established de facto control over the shoal and the July 2016 arbitral tribunal found that China had violated the traditional fishing rights of Philippine fishermen. In 2013, the Philippine government under President Benigno Aquino III filed an arbitration case concerning China's maritime claims in the South China Sea.

Under President Ferdinand “Bongbong” Marcos Jr., the Philippines has strengthened its security cooperation with the United States while maintaining diplomatic and economic engagement with China; he has likewise stated that his administration does not pursue a policy of distancing itself from China. China has sought to increase its influence in the Philippines and the wider region, while the United States and China remain engaged in broader strategic competition in the Indo-Pacific.

The Duterte administration emphasized diplomatic alignment with China and engaged in regional talks over a South China Sea Code of Conduct. A strategy that faced domestic and international backlash over its concessions to Beijing. China is the Philippines' top trading partner. According to a survey conducted in late 2023, the country that Filipinos distrusted the most was China. The Philippines also had the highest threat perception of China according to a survey released by the Pew Research Center in July 2026, by at least 76%. Relations strained during the presidency of Bongbong Marcos due to increasing tensions over the South China sea dispute, resulting in the Philippines' withdrawal from the Belt and Road Initiative in 2023 and allegations of election interference in 2025.

== Pre-colonial political relations ==
The earliest Chinese artifact uncovered in the Philippines appears to be from the Tang dynasty. After that, no other ceramics have been uncovered earlier than the 9th century based on available evidence. Imperial China acknowledged the existence of several Precolonial Philippine settlements and the Chinese Emperor received embassies from Filipino Datus, Rajahs, and Sultans. Note that the usage of "king" and "kingdoms" here are loose translations based on how centralized cultures understood the social organizations of Filipinos before the late 16th century, the consensus of anthropologists and historians is that pre-historic to 16th century Filipino social structures are classified as "chiefdoms" (see datu).

=== Relations between Song China and the Rajahnate of Butuan (11th century) ===
The first recorded precolonial Philippine tribute mission to China was from Butuan in 1001 A.D. according to the Sung Shih. Since 1003 A.D., King Kiling of Butuan began sending diplomatic missions to China. By 1011 A.D., Rajah Sri Bata Shajah, sent an envoy, Likan Shieh, to the Chinese imperial court and demanded equal diplomatic status. China agreed and its relations opened direct commercial links to Butuan, which broke its reliance from the Chinese trade monopoly held by Tondo and Champa.

=== Relations with China under the Yongle Emperor (1402–1424) ===
The Kingdom of Kumalarang (Gumalalang, 古麻剌朗) and the Pre-sultanate kingdoms of Sulu, precolonial Philippine kingdoms, has been noted to have significant political relations with China during the Ming dynasty.

According to the records in The Dynastic history of Ming (the Ming shi), in 1417 a Ming eunuch arrived in Kumalarang with an imperial edict, bringing fine silk and urged the local ruler to pledge loyalty to the Yongle Emperor. By 1420, the ruler of Kumalarang, Ganlayi Yibendun (幹剌義亦奔敦), visited the Ming court with his wife and subjects, presenting local goods as a sign of submission. The Ming court elevated his status, and during a meeting, he expressed his desire for formal acknowledgment from the emperor. The emperor granted his request and providing him with the necessary honors and symbols of authority. Ganlayi Yibendun left the Ming capital in early 1421 but died at a seaport in Fuzhou failing to return to his kingdom.

Also in 1417, three pre-sultanate Sulu rulers organized a large mission, involving over 340 people, to establish their power and relationships. China initially viewed them as temporarily in charge but later recognized them as equals, granting the three rulers title of "king" (guowang, 國王), and gave them various gifts and official items. According to the Ming Annals:

[The] three kings from Sulu went on a tribute mission to China in 1417—Paduka Batala (Sulu east king), Maja Raja Kolamating (Chinese for Kamaluddin) of the West Country, and Paduka Palabu from Duon (Chinese for Dungun) state in Tawi-Tawi ... Kalamuddin was proclaimed by the emperor as king of the west (because he lived in the western part of Jolo islands).

The delegation stayed in the Ming capital for twenty-seven days before departing, but soon after, Paduka Pahala (Baduge Badala, 巴都葛叭答剌), the Eastern King of Sulu, died during the journey home in 1417.

Reflecting on the deaths of Paduka Pahala in 1417, Ganlayi Yibendun in 1421, and the ruler of Boni in 1405, Luo Yuejiong, a Ming author wrote:

Our court did not bother to dispatch a single envoy [to these countries]. But their rulers sailed across the sea with their wives and subjects to present gifts. They died in China thousands of miles away from home. Yet they never regretted their deeds. They would have never so wholeheartedly offered their loyalty [to China], if it was not due to the magnificent virtue [of our emperor].

— Luo Yuejiong, Xianbin lu

In the Luzon region, numerous states or kingdoms responded to the invitation of the Yongle Emperor to send tribute missions. Rulers from Pangasinan, for instance, appeared in the Chinese court numerous times such as Chieftain Kamayin in 1406, as well as Chieftains Taymey and Liyü in 1408 and 1409. In 1411, the emperor offered the Pangasinan party to a state banquet.

== Colonial and contemporary political relations ==
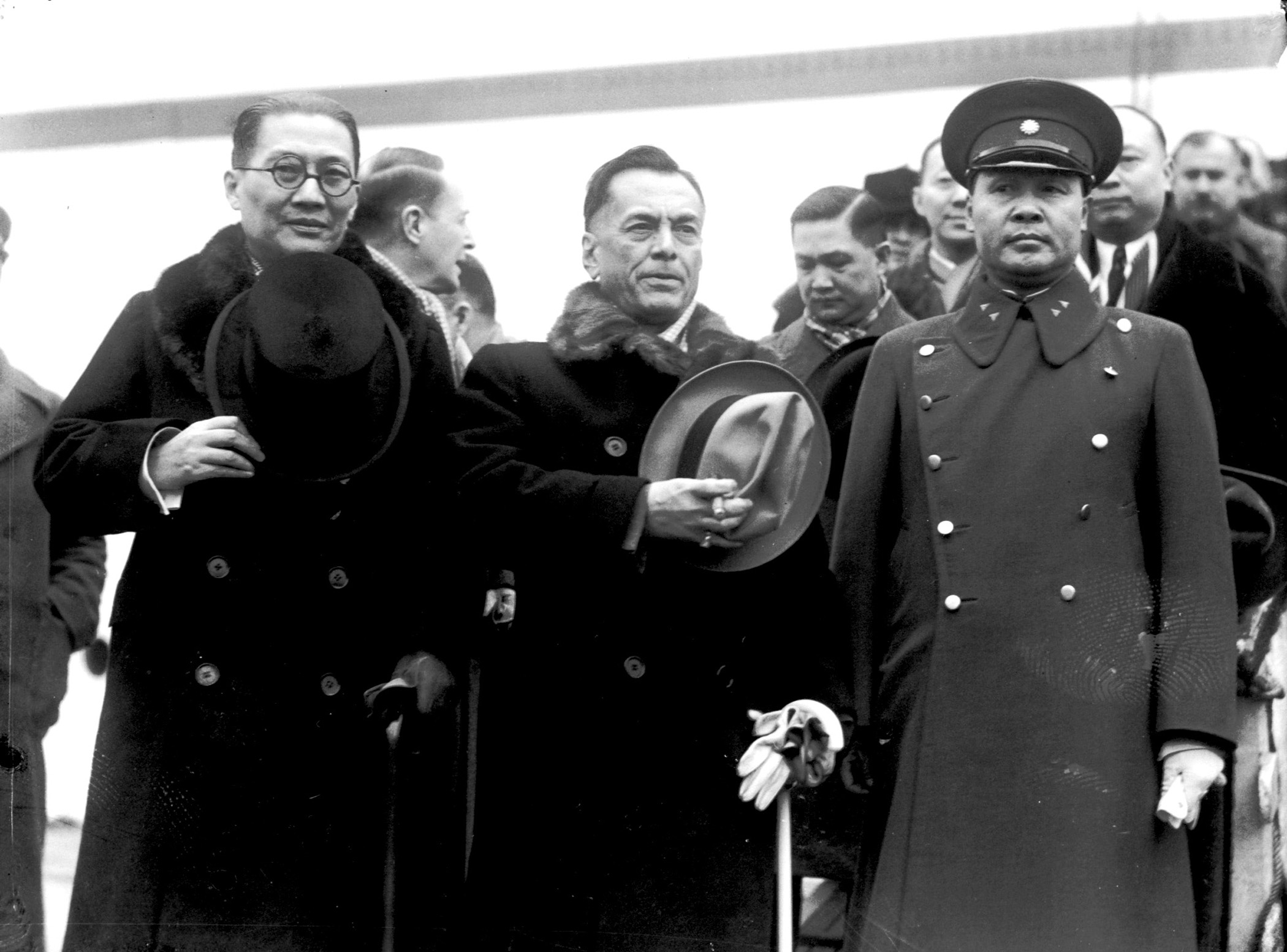
Philippine Commonwealth President Manuel L. Quezon in Shanghai, 1937

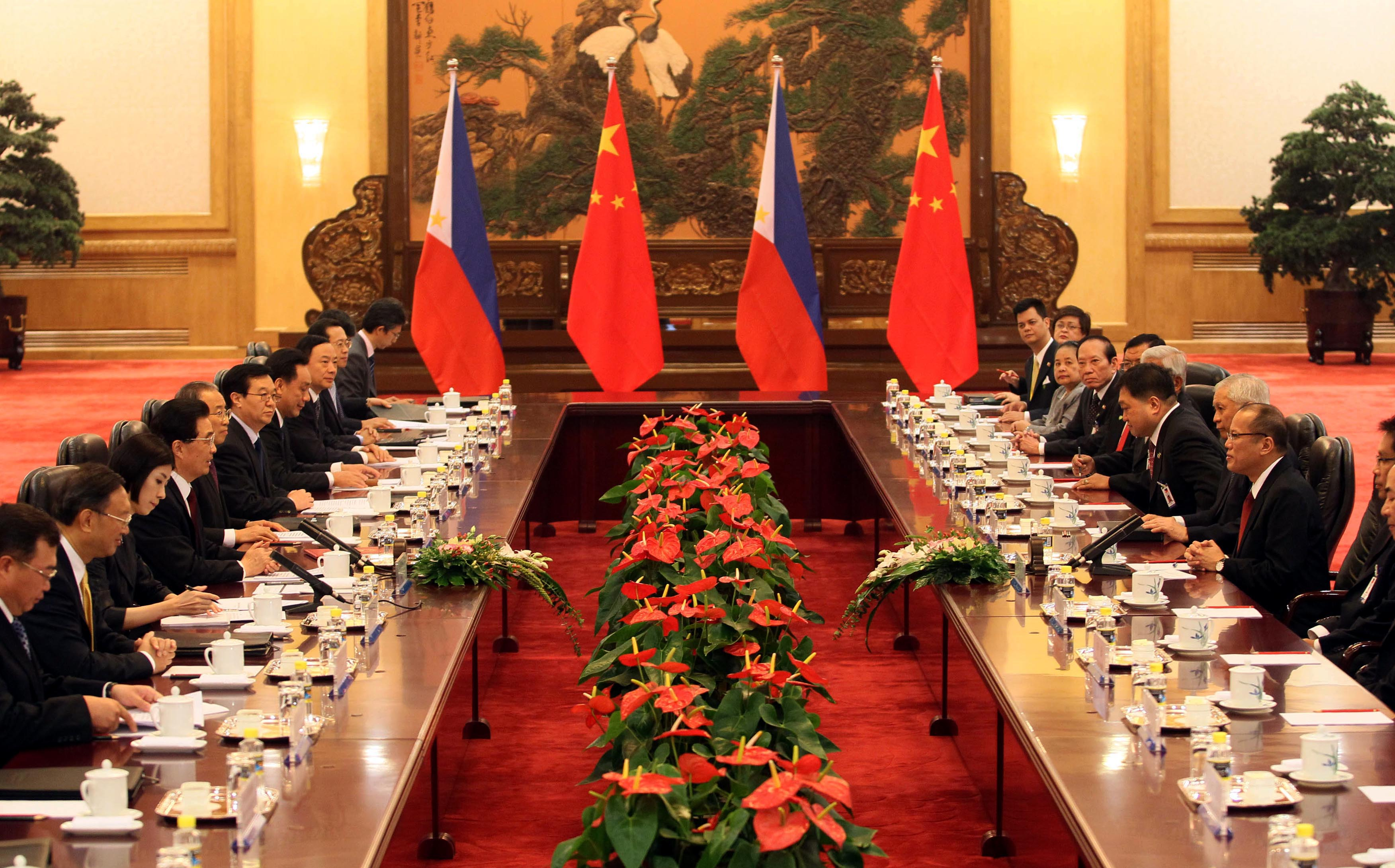
Bilateral meeting between China and the Philippines, led by Hu Jintao and Benigno Aquino III, at the Great Hall of the People in Beijing, 2011.

=== Spanish colonial period ===
During the Spanish colonial period, several notable armed confrontations occurred between the authorities and overseas Chinese in the Philippines such as the 1603 Sangley Rebellion and the 1639 Sangley Rebellion.

=== American occupation (1899 – 1946) ===
During the Philippine-American War, Chinese nationalist figures such as Sun Yat-sen expressed support for the Philippine revolutionaries under Emilio Aguinaldo. In 1899, Sun arranged for Japanese arms to be shipped to the Philippines covertly.

Between 1921 and 1934, relations between China and the Philippines were marked by cooperation. In 1927, Philippine Senate President Manuel L. Quezon urged the Filipinos to distance themselves from Chinese nationalists due to concerns about the Philippines' relationship with the United States. He believed that having links with China would hinder the Philippines' independence campaign. By the 1930s, there were debates in the US government on granting the Philippines its independence. Newton W. Gilbert, who formerly served as the Philippine Vice Governor-General, sent a letter to the US Senate stating the importance of keeping the Philippines while also noting the consequences of a possible Chinese invasion.

Following Philippine independence in 1946, the Philippines established diplomatic relations with the Republic of China (ROC), then the internationally recognized government of China.

=== Cold War ===
The Philippines and the ROC signed the Sino-Philippine Treaty of Amity in 1947, establishing formal relations and provisions for peaceful and friendly relations between the two governments. During the Cold War, the two countries were part of the anti-communist camp that view the Chinese Communists as a security threat. During the Korean War, the Philippine Expeditionary Forces to Korea under the United Nations Command fought the PRC's People's Volunteer Army in multiple battles.

=== Establishment of official diplomatic relations ===
It began considering normalizing relations with the People's Republic at the start of the 1970s and the Philippines recognized the PRC on 9 June 1975, with the signing of the Joint Communiqué by leaders of the two countries.

=== Major agreements ===
In 2009, the Philippines and China signed the Joint Action Plan for Strategic Cooperation, a five-year agreement outlining increased cooperation in various areas.

In 2016, Philippine president Rodrigo Duterte and Chinese leader Xi Jinping created the biannual Bilateral Consultation Mechanism on the South China Sea, a mechanism for bilateral dialogue on disputes in the South China Sea and other issues of concern.

On 16 November 2017, the Philippines and China signed fourteen deals on a variety of issues, including transportation and military aid, worth approximately US$21.6 million.

In July 2019, UN ambassadors of 37 countries, including Philippines, signed a joint letter to the United Nations Human Rights Council defending China's policies of persecution of Uyghurs in Xinjiang. The Philippines was one of 16 countries that defended China's policies in Xinjiang in 2019 but did not do so in 2020.

=== Belt and Road Initiative ===
During the respective visits of Philippine President Rodrigo Duterte to the People's Republic of China and the Chinese Communist Party general secretary Xi Jinping's visit to the Philippines, the two agreed to increase China's Official Development Assistance (ODA) to the Philippines from the People's Republic of China as part of China's Belt and Road Initiative. However, concerns were soon raised over the terms and conditions of the ODA funding and the lack of transparency into the details. As of 2018, the delivery of that aid had also stalled, with few firm commitments put in place by the Xi administration. The Duterte administration nevertheless continued to make the relationship a major part of its economic agenda. During the Duterte administration, several infrastructure projects were pursued with Chinese financing or in connection with the Belt and Road Initiative, including the Subic–Clark Railway, Mindanao Railway, and PNR South Long Haul projects. However, financing for these three railway projects encountered delays; in 2022, the Philippine government withdrew the loan applications after the Chinese government had not acted on the funding requests. In January 2023, during the Marcos administration, the Philippines and China nevertheless signed a memorandum of understanding on cooperation under the Belt and Road Initiative, alongside other bilateral agreements concerning infrastructure and development cooperation. Later that year, the Philippines dropped China as a financing partner for the three railway projects, with the Department of Transportation stating that alternative sources of financing would be explored.

During the Marcos Jr. administration in 2023, the Philippines withdrew from the Belt and Road initiative.

== Trade and commerce ==
=== Middle Imperial China and Precolonial Philippine States ===
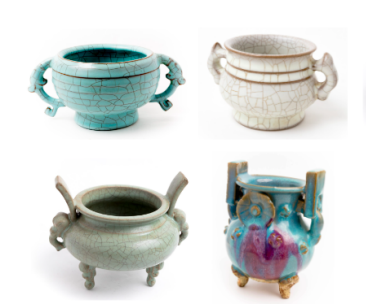
Royal porcelain-ware from the Song Dynasty era excavated in the Kalaga Putuan Crescent (Butuan)

Since Song dynasty times in China and precolonial times in the Philippines, evidence of trade contact can already be observed in the Chinese ceramics found in archaeological sites, like in Santa Ana, Manila. Based from Chinese historical records, traders from Mayi (possibly located in northern Mindoro) began visiting Canton in 971 A.D. during the Northern Song dynasty. They returned in 982 A.D., catching the interest of Chinese officials. In the early 11th century, traders from Puduan (Butuan) and Sanmalan (Zamboanga) arrived as tribute payers, trading with the Song court in 1004, 1007, and 1011 A.D., bringing back items like Chinese ceramics.

Yuan dynasty sources expressed how valuable the pearls produced in Sulu, with the Chinese wearing them as jewelries.

=== Late Imperial China and Spanish Philippines ===
During Ming and Qing dynasty times in China and Spanish colonial era in the Philippines, the Philippines through Manila has had centuries-long trade contacts with cities such as Quanzhou, Zhangzhou, Xiamen in Fujian province and Guangzhou and Macau in Guangdong province, especially as part of the Maritime Silk Road trade, then connected with the Manila-Acapulco Galleon Trade that ensured the export of Chinese trade goods, such as chinaware, across Spanish America and Europe in the Spanish colonial empire and the constant supply of Spanish silver into the economy of China as observed in the later dominance and widespread use of the Spanish silver dollar coins in the Ming and Qing dynasty coinage and its general acceptance as a de facto standard of trade across the Far East around the 16th to 19th century. In 1567, the Spanish trade port in the city of Manila in the Philippines as part of the Spanish colonial empire was opened which until the fall of the Ming dynasty brought over forty million Kuping Taels of silver to China with the annual Chinese imports numbering at 53,000,000 pesos (each peso being 8 real) or 300,000 Kuping Taels. During the Ming dynasty the average Chinese junk which took the voyage from the Spanish East Indies to the city of Guangzhou took with it eighty thousand pesos, a number which increased under the Qing dynasty as until the mid-18th century the volume of imported Spanish pesos had increased to 235,370,000 (or 169 460,000 Kuping Tael). The Spanish mention that around 12,000,000 pesos were shipped from Acapulco to Manila in the year 1597 as part of the Manila-Acapulco Galleon Trade while in other years this usually numbered between one and four million pesos.

=== Modern Period ===
Bilateral trade volume in 2007 was US$30.62 billion. From January to October 2008, bilateral trade volume reached US$25.3 billion, an increase of 1.4% as compared with the same period last year. By the end of September 2008, the actually utilized value of accumulative investment from the Philippines to China reached US$2.5 billion. China's transformation into a major economic power in the 21st century has led to an increase of foreign investments in the bamboo network, a network of overseas Chinese businesses operating in the markets of Southeast Asia that share common family and cultural ties.

The Philippines and China signed an air rights agreement in 2010, significantly increasing flights between the two countries.

In August 2011, the Philippines and China signed a five-year trade development program worth US$6 billion.

On 17 September 2014, the Philippines and China signed a memorandum of understanding for the promotion of investment cooperation.

In 2022 the Philippines became able to export fresh durian to China. Market access is sometimes used as a tool of Chinese diplomacy; banana exports from the Philippines have previously been restricted during times of geopolitical tension.

A 2024 study by AidData found that from 2000 to 2022, China's investments in the Philippines exceeded US$9 billion. Between 2010 and 2023, Chinese foreign direct investment (FDI) in the Philippines reached US$21.9 billion. By 2023, China became the second largest market for Philippine exports, which at some point became the largest during the first semester amounting to US$5.58 billion or equivalent to a share of 16 percent followed by the US and Japan. However, since 2024, the Philippines has been urging the US and its allies to increase their inward investments to the country in an attempt to counter China.

== Chinese Filipinos ==
Chinese Filipinos constitute one group of overseas Chinese. Chinese Filipinos are present within several commerce and business sectors in the Philippines and a few sources estimate companies which comprise a majority of the Philippine economy are owned by Chinese Filipinos, if one includes Chinese mestizos.

In view of the ongoing territorial dispute of China and the Philippines (such as Scarborough Shoal), Chinese-Filipinos prefer a peaceful solution through diplomatic talks while some view that China should not extend its claims to other parts of South China Sea. Nevertheless, the community has expressed concerns over the increased anti-Chinese sentiment from other Filipinos resulting from issues surrounding the POGO businesses and investigations on the background of former Bamban mayor Alice Guo, who was accused by the authorities of having links to a POGO business in the municipality.

According to a 2023 report by the Philippine Center for Investigative Journalism, Chinese Filipino tycoon George Siy's think tank, the Integrated Development Studies Institute, has been a major promoter of pro-Chinese government narratives in the Philippines.

Sealight Foundation global security analyst Ray Powell took note of the recent attempts by the Chinese government to exploit the Chinese Filipino community. In a March 21, 2026 forum, he particularly mentioned the so-called "blood transfusion plan" for Chinese Filipino schools in the country. He clarified that their organization's research did not target the entire community as a whole. Instead, it sought to prevent the "hostile foreign state" from taking over these Chinese Filipino institutions. Powell's statements allegedly influenced the exodus of many Chinese volunteer teachers in the country, with their parents from the mainland pleading for their return. The Chinese Filipino schools had to conduct online classes with substitute teachers as a result. The Chinese embassy criticized Powell's statements as "malicious smear campaigns" and claimed these threaten the "time-honored friendship between the Chinese and Filipino peoples".

Depictions of Chinese people from the Ming Dynasty in the Boxer Codex, c.1590
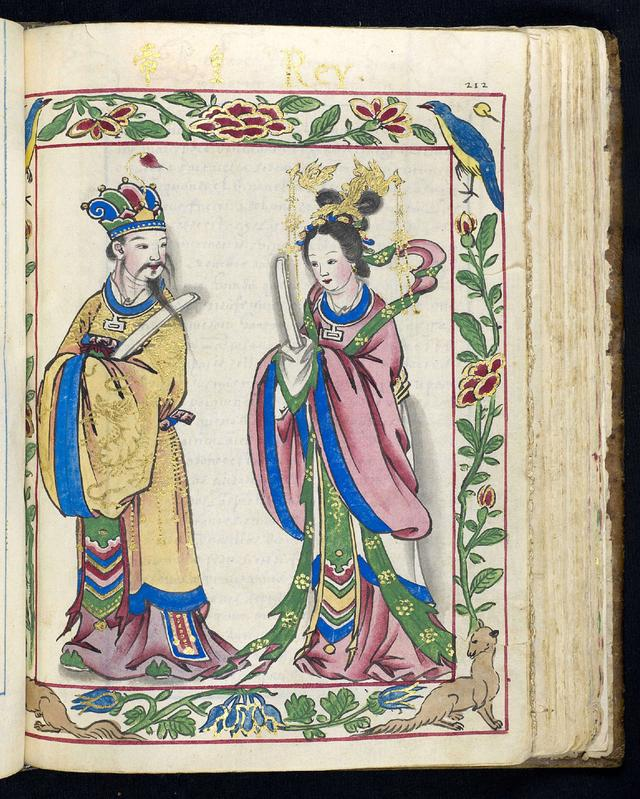
Emperor & Empress of Ming Dynasty China

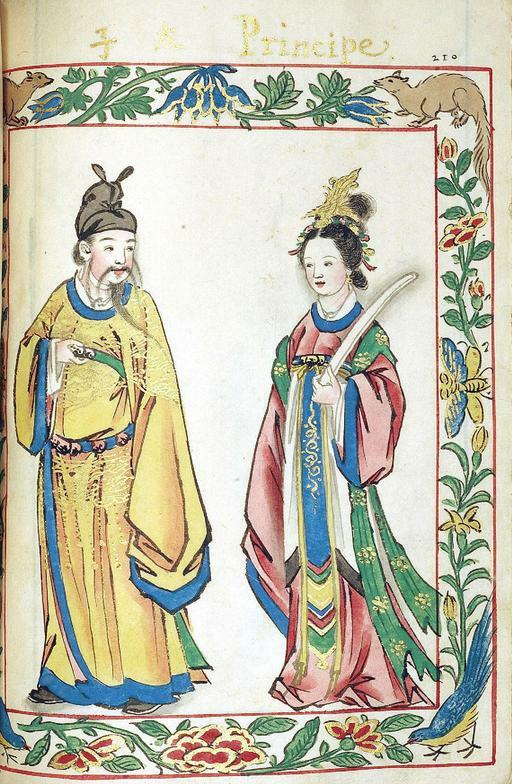
Noble Prince and Princess from Ming Dynasty China

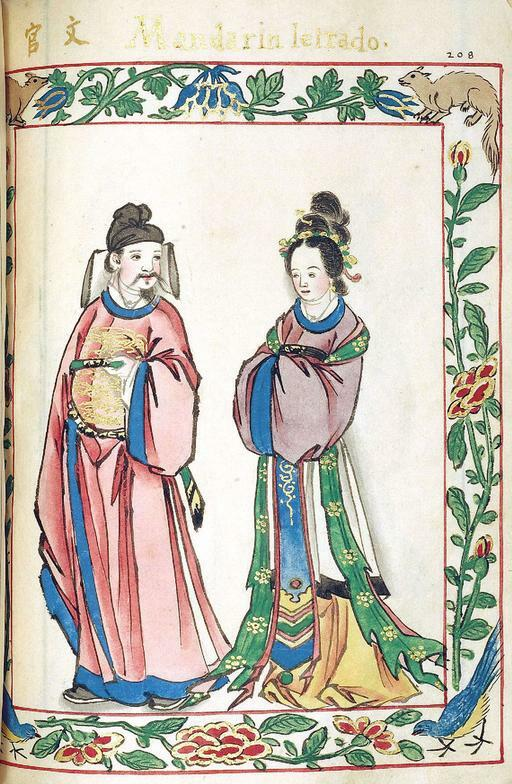
Mandarin Bureaucrat from Ming Dynasty

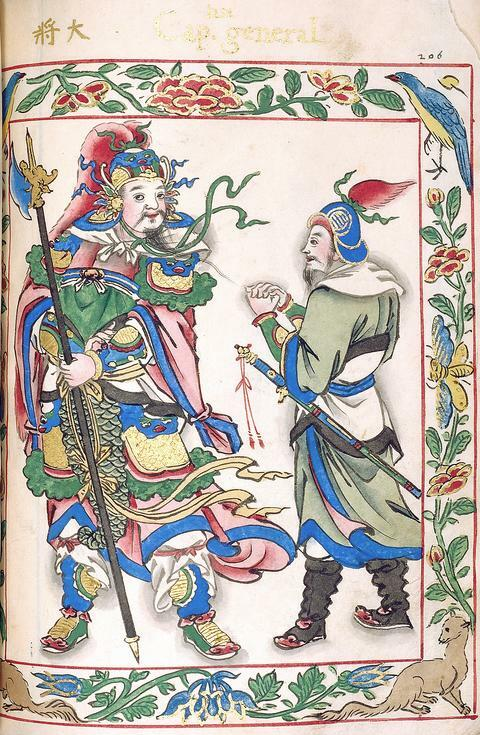
Ming Dynasty Chinese general with attendant

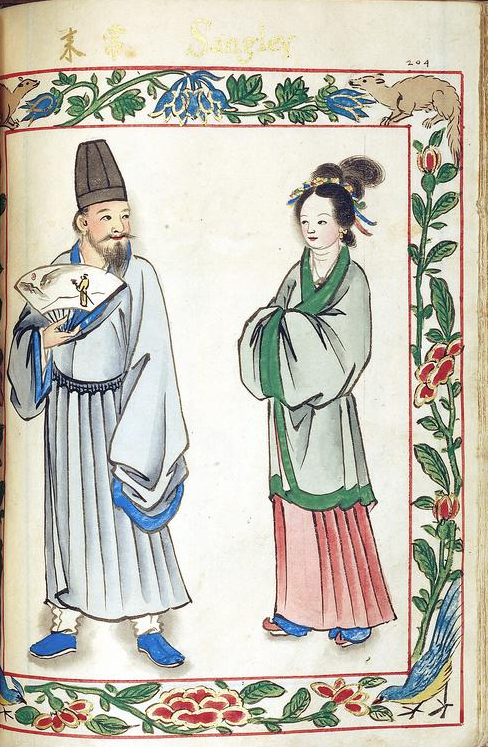
A Chinese couple wearing hanfu during Ming Dynasty times

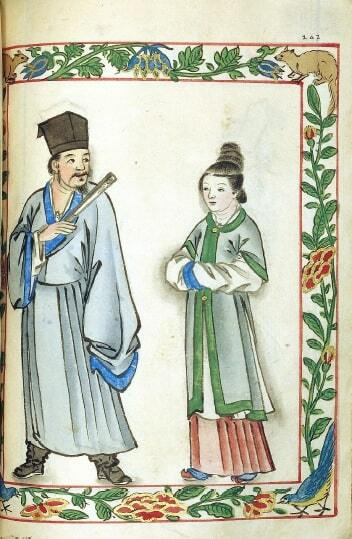
Another Chinese couple wearing hanfu during Ming Dynasty times

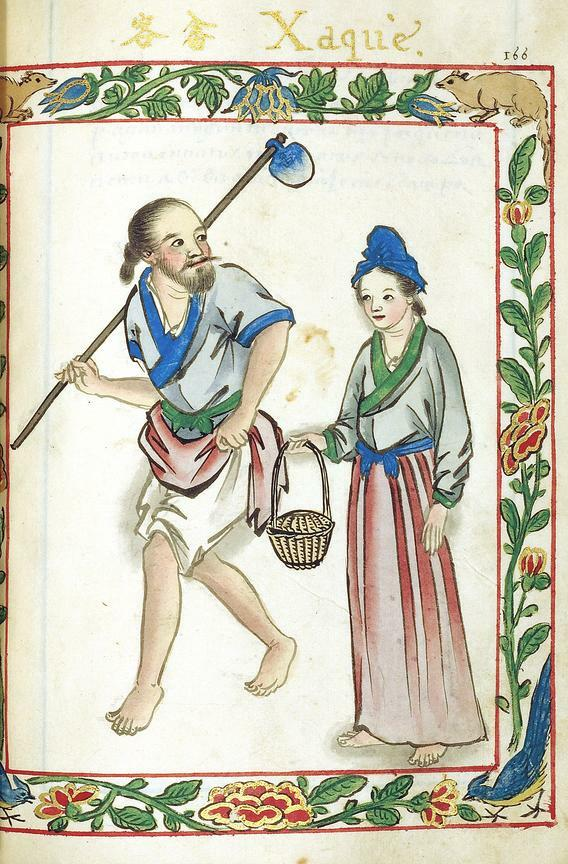
She couple wearing hanfu during Ming Dynasty times

== Sister city agreements ==
There are 24 pairs of sister cities or sister provinces between China and the Philippines:

- Hangzhou and Baguio
- Guangzhou and Manila
- Shanghai and Metro Manila
- Xiamen and Cebu City
- Shenyang and Quezon City
- Fushun and Lipa
- Hainan and Cebu province
- Sanya and Lapu-Lapu
- Shishi and Naga, Camarines Sur
- Shandong and Ilocos Norte
- Zibo and Mandaue
- Anhui and Cavite
- Hubei and Leyte
- Liuzhou and Muntinlupa
- Hezhou and San Fernando,
- Harbin and Cagayan de Oro
- Laibin and Laoag
- Beijing and Manila
- Jiangxi and Bohol
- Guangxi Zhuang Autonomous Region and Davao City
- Lanzhou and Albay
- Beihai and Puerto Princesa
- Fujian and Laguna
- Wuxi and Puerto Princesa

== Territorial disputes ==
=== Spratly Islands and the South China Sea ===
Territorial claims in the South China Sea

The two countries have disputes over the sovereignty of some islands and shoals in the Spratly Islands. These disputes are linked to other disputes in the South China Sea. China conducts grey-zone operations in these waters. Rising tensions has led the Philippines to invest further in its military forces, and to deepen cooperation with the United States and Japan.

In 1734, the Spanish colonial government in the Philippines published the first edition of the Velarde map, detailing the territories under full sovereign control of Spanish Philippines, which included Scarborough Shoal (called Panacot in the indigenous language in the map) and the Spratly Islands (referred in the map as Los Bajos de Paragua). The 1734 Velarde map is the earliest map to showcase the sovereignty of a nation over Scarborough Shoal and the Spratly Islands. In 1792, the Spanish colonial government of the territory of the Philippines launched the first ever survey of Scarborough Shoal on 4 May 1792. The survey, Plano de la Navigacion, was taken by Alessandro Malaspina aboard the Sta. Lucia, with Filipino comrades. The official territories of the Philippines was again published in the 1808 Carita General del Archipelago Filipino and again in the 1875 Carita General del Archipelago Filipino.

After the Spanish-American War, Spain lost and ceded the territory of the Philippines to the United States through the 1898 Treaty of Paris. The 1898 Treaty of Paris created a treaty line, where Scarborough Shoal, the Spratly Islands, and parts of Tawi-tawi continued to be under Spanish sovereignty. This led to talks between Spain and the United States, which ended upon the signing of the 1900 Treaty of Washington, which rectified retroactively the 1898 Treaty of Paris. Under the 1900 Treaty of Washington, "all islands belonging to the Philippine Archipelago, lying outside the lines described in Article III" were also ceded to the United States as part of the territory of the Philippines, where Scarborough Shoal, the Spratly Islands, and the rest of Tawi-tawi was included. From 1899 to 1902, the United States war department in the territory of the Philippines republished and reissued four times the 1875 Carita General del Archipelago Filipino with the addition of military telegraph lines, military cable lines, eastern cable company lines, and military department boundaries. The official map of the entire Philippine territory under Spanish rule was effectively adopted as the entire Philippine territory under American rule. During the 1928 Islas Palmas international case, the United States, as representative of the territory of the Philippines, reiterated in a court memorandum that the 1875 Carta General del Archipielago Filipino "is both an American official and a Spanish official map" of Philippine territory, bounding the United States on its recognition of the Scarborough Shoal and the Spratly Islands as Philippine territory. In 1930, the United States and the United Kingdom signed a treaty, where the United Kingdom recognized the territory of Philippines which included Scarborough Shoal and the Spratlys, effectively bounding the United Kingdom's successor countries as well, such as Malaysia and Brunei but there has been disagreement with a Philippines view that the treaty covers the waters within the Treaty Limits by at least the United States and Britain. In 1932, China sent a Note Verbale to France, declaring that China's southernmost territory was the Paracels.

After rounds of consultations to address territory disputes, both sides agreed to strive for a solution through bilateral friendly consultation. In October 2004, Chinese Maritime Safety Administration and Philippine Coast Guard conducted a joint sand table rescue exercise for the first time. China National Offshore Oil Corp. and Philippine National Oil Company signed the "Agreement for Joint Marine Seismic Undertaking on Certain Areas in the South China Sea" on 1 September 2004. In May 2005, Vietnam agreed to join the Sino-Philippine cooperation. Oil companies from three countries signed the "Agreement for Joint Marine Seismic Undertaking on Certain Areas in the South China Sea" in March 2005.

Due to the 2012 Scarborough Shoal standoff, relations between the two countries significantly worsened. On 8 April 2012, a Philippine navy vessel cornered several Chinese fishing vessels in the Scarborough Shoal lagoon, suspecting the fishing vessels of illegal fishing. Two China Maritime Surveillance vessels arrived shortly thereafter, placing themselves between the Chinese fishing vessels and the Philippine navy vessel to prevent the Philippine navy from making an arrest. A two-month standoff followed. During the initial phase of the standoff, the Philippines withdrew the navy vessel and replaced it with a coast guard vessel and a Bureau of Fisheries and Aquatic Resources Vessel. China responded by reinforcing its presence, first with the advanced fisheries patrol ship Yuzheng 310 and later other ships to reach a total of 14 vessels in the area by 3 May. An approaching typhoon caused all participants in the standoff to disperse. Chinese ships returned to the area shortly thereafter and maintained a regular presence there until October 2016.

In October 2012, Chinese Vice Foreign Minister Fu Ying visited Manila in an effort to persuade the Philippines to continue bilateral discussions to address the South China Sea territorial disputes and to avoid involving the United States or taking the dispute to an international forum. The Philippines responded by initiating an arbitration against China.

==== 2013–2016 South China Sea arbitration ====
In January 2013, the Philippines formally initiated arbitration proceedings against China's claim on the territories within the nine-dash line that includes Spratly Islands, which it contended was unlawful under the United Nations Convention on the Law of the Sea (UNCLOS). An arbitration tribunal was constituted under Annex VII of UNCLOS and it was decided in July 2013 that the Permanent Court of Arbitration (PCA) would function as registry and provide administrative duties in the proceedings.

On 12 July 2016, the arbitrators agreed with the Philippines on most of its contentions. They concluded in the award that there was no evidence that China had historically exercised exclusive control over the waters or resources, hence there was "no legal basis for China to claim historic rights" over the nine-dash line. Accordingly, the PCA tribunal decision is ruled as final and non-appealable by either countries. The tribunal also criticized China's land reclamation projects and its construction of artificial islands in the Spratly Islands, saying that it had caused "severe harm to the coral reef environment". It also characterized Taiping Island and other features of the Spratly Islands as "rocks" under UNCLOS, and therefore are not entitled to a 200 nautical mile exclusive economic zone. China however rejected the ruling, calling it "ill-founded". Taiwan, which currently administers Taiping Island, the largest of the Spratly Islands, also rejected the ruling.

China's response was to ignore the arbitration result and to continue pursuing bilateral discussions with the Philippines. The day after the ruling, China's Vice Foreign Minister Liu Zhenmin stated at a press conference that China had "taken note of the positive attitude of the new Philippine government under President Duterte toward resuming dialogue with China and progressing bilateral relationships from various aspects. We welcome this initiative with open arms."

On 8 August 2016, the Philippines dispatched former president Fidel V. Ramos to Hong Kong to mitigate tensions following the arbitration result. Ramos met with Fu Ying (chair of China's Foreign Affairs Committee for the National People's Congress) and Wu Shicun (president of the National Institute for South China Sea Studies). Ramos conveyed the Philippines' willingness to engage in formal discussions with China. The three issued a statement in their personal capacities emphasizing cooperation and dialogue between the two countries.

On 20 October 2016, Duterte visited China where he and Xi Jinping resumed bilateral discussions on the South China Sea dispute. In an effort to demonstrate its cooperative approach, following the visit China allowed Filipino fisherman to return to the area of Scarborough Shoal.

==== Other incidents ====
In April 2019, international satellites and local reports revealed that Chinese ships have swarmed Philippine-controlled areas in the South China Sea through a cabbage strategy. Later reports showed that endangered giant clams under Philippine law protection were illegally being harvested by Chinese ships. The swarming continued for the entirety of April, with the Philippine foreign affairs secretary, Teddy Locsin Jr., expressing dismay over the incident and calling it an intentional "embarrassment" aimed against the Philippines. A few days before the 2019 Philippine independence day, President Duterte stated that the country may go to war with China if China claims disputed resources.

On 9 June 2019, a Chinese ship, Yuemaobinyu 42212, rammed and sank a Philippine fishing vessel, F/B Gem-Ver, near Reed Bank, west of Palawan. The fishermen were caught by surprise as they were asleep during the said event. The Chinese ship afterwards left the sank Philippine vessel, while the Filipino fishermen were adrift in the middle of sea and left to the elements, in violation of a rule under UNCLOS. The 22 Filipino fishermen were later rescued by a ship from Vietnam.

The government responded a day later, stating that they may cut ties with China if the culprits are not punished by the Chinese. China has stated that the event was an ordinary maritime accident, which was later backed up by investigations from the Armed Forces of the Philippines.

The Chinese crew was later criticized for failing to undertake measures to avoid colliding with the F/B Gem-Ver and abandoning the stricken boat's crew, in violation of maritime laws.

In 2020, Facebook took down a Chinese network which was part of a disinformation campaign against the Philippines. The campaign used fake profiles in an attempt to influence public opinion, particularly related to politics and the South China Sea.

==== Increasing escalations during the Marcos presidency ====
The election of Philippine president Bongbong Marcos in 2022 saw the onset of worsening Philippine-China relations and frequent skirmishes in the South China Sea. Marcos' decision to increase the number of Philippine bases the United States military troops can use under the Enhanced Defense Cooperation Agreement from five to nine met vehement opposition from the Chinese government. Marcos made overt signals that the Philippines would inevitably get involved in the event of a Taiwan-China conflict, prompting China to warn the Philippines against "playing with fire". Under Marcos, the Philippine Coast Guard began a strategy of publicizing China's aggressive actions in the South China Sea by inviting journalists during territorial encounters and releasing the photographs and videos thereafter in an attempt to gain international support. Among the escalations since 2023 include China Coast Guard's firing on Philippine military ships in the Spratly Islands waters; the Philippines accusing China of parking its navy and coast guard vessels near Scarborough Shoal in an apparent attempt to block Philippine vessels from passing through the area; the Philippine Coast Guard accusing China Coast Guard ships of jamming their automatic identification system (AIS); and, amidst Chinese and Philippine military operations around the disputed Scarborough Shoal in August 2024, the Armed Forces of the Philippines accusing China of "dangerous and provocative actions" after two Chinese Air Force aircraft dropped flares in the path of a Philippines' plane that China claimed was "illegally intruding" into its airspace. Additionally, in May 2024, the Philippines' Department of Foreign Affairs said it would probe Chinese diplomats' activities around wiretapping after reports surfaced of a recording of an agreement between a Philippine military official and Chinese officials over the South China Sea.

In April 2024, the Philippine Coast Guard deployed one of its key patrol ships, the BRP Teresa Magbanua, to the Sabina Shoal area after Filipino scientists discovered submerged piles of crushed corals in its shallows, raising suspicions that the Chinese may be preparing to build a structure on the site. In August 2024, two separate collisions involving ships from the Chinese Coast Guard and the Philippine Coast Guard occurred near the Sabina Shoal, resulting in significant damage to Philippine vessels, including the BRP Teresa Magbanua. In response, Commodore Jay Tarriela of the Philippine Coast Guard announced that the Magbanua would not withdraw from the Sabina Shoal area "despite the harassment, bullying activities, and escalatory action of the Chinese coast guard". Chinese Foreign Ministry spokesperson Mao Ning described the Philippines' anchoring of the vessel in the shoal as a strategy to "permanently occupy the area".

The United States' deployment of the Typhon missile system in northern Philippines in April 2024 prompted condemnation from China and Russia, which respectively accused the US of threatening regional peace and stoking an arms race. Initially, the Philippine government reassured the public that the missile system shall remain only in the Philippines until September 2024; nearing the specified deadline, however, plans on extending its stay in the country were announced, with a senior Philippine government official remarking it would help deter China and "give them sleepless nights".

On 18 February 2025, a Chinese military helicopter flew within 3 meters of a Philippine patrol plane over Scarborough Shoal, leading to a 30-minute standoff. The Philippines warned the helicopter pilot of the danger posed to the crew. On 21 February 2025, China accused the Philippines of illegally flying three aircraft over the disputed Spratly Islands. The Chinese military said it drove away two Cessna 208 planes and an N-22 aircraft.

On June 7, 2025, a Chinese maritime militia vessel with hull number 16838 deployed a nylon parachute anchor during a period of 3 hours when apparently stuck over Pag-asa Reef 1, about 2.6 km (1.6 mi) from Pag-asa Island within Philippine territorial waters. The vessel was escorted away by China Coast Guard ships. About 30% of the area of the reef, being over 300 m^{2} (3,200 sq ft) of coral was damaged, with broken hard and soft coral fragments, that was attributed to the anchor's drag rather than a hull impact upon a later joint assessment by the Palawan Council for Sustainable Development, Western Philippines University, and the Philippine Coast Guard. The anchor was still present at 9 m (30 ft) underwater, blocking sunlight to the reef so threatening further damage. The environmental loss was estimated to be ₱11.1 million, within a maximum protection zone under Republic Act No. 7611, where all human activity is banned. These findings may result in legal and diplomatic action under the Philippine Fisheries Code. This is the first well documented case of such damage by a parachute anchor from a Chinese militia vessel.

On 12 July 2025, the Philippine Coast Guard cutter BRP Teresa Magbanua (MRRV-9701) intercepted the Chinese Type 815G-class electronic surveillance ship Tianwangxing (793), accompanied by the China Coast Guard Zhaojun-class cutter 4203, approximately 70 nautical miles west of the Philippine archipelago within the country's exclusive economic zone. The Philippine vessel issued radio challenges, which were ignored by the Chinese Navy ship, while the escorting cutter responded with a counter-challenge asserting China's jurisdiction over the disputed waters. Philippine Coast Guard spokesperson Commodore Jay Tarriela described the interception as a “proactive response” and urged Chinese vessels to respect Philippine jurisdiction, respond to communications, and cease unauthorized activities in the EEZ. The PLA Navy later deployed the 052D-class destroyer Guilin (164) to escort the spy ship, which was observed conducting flight operations with a Z-9 utility helicopter. The incident, which took place during the U.S.-Philippines Cope Thunder military exercises, underscored continuing tensions in China–Philippines maritime relations and followed similar encounters involving Chinese military and civilian vessels operating near or within Philippine-claimed waters.

In September 2025, China announced plans to establish a nature reserve on the disputed Scarborough Shoal, known as Huangyan Island in China and Bajo de Masinloc in the Philippines, prompting Manila to condemn it as a "pretext for occupation" that violates Philippine sovereignty, amid ongoing South China Sea territorial disputes and overlapping claims with several Southeast Asian nations.

In April 2026, China sent navy ships and aircraft to patrol near Scarborough Shoal in the South China Sea, claiming it was protecting its territorial claims. The patrols came after the joint Balikatan military exercises by the Philippines, the United States, Australia, and New Zealand. That same month, the Philippines discovered cyanide on Chinese boats seized near Second Thomas Shoal, which they believe was used to kill local fish populations. At the same time, satellite imagery showed that China had deployed vessels and installed a floating barrier at the entrance to Scarborough Shoal in the South China Sea, a disputed area also claimed by the Philippines. Philippine authorities stated that the move restricted access for their fishermen, amid ongoing tensions over control of the shoal.

In May 2026, the Philippine Coast Guard reported that a Chinese research vessel, Xiang Yang Hong 33, was conducting unauthorized operations near Reed Bank in the South China Sea, accompanied by Chinese Coast Guard and militia ships. The Philippines said this violated its sovereignty and international law, while China claimed it was a legitimate scientific mission. That same month, China and the Philippines got into a dispute over Sandy Cay in the South China Sea. China said Filipino personnel had no right to be there, while the Philippines said Chinese ships were operating in its waters without permission.

In late June 2026, China deployed warships and aircraft in the South China Sea after a joint naval exercise by the United States and the Philippines near the disputed Scarborough Shoal.

==== Ayungin Shoal incident ====
On June 17, 2024, the China Coast Guard interfered with a resupply mission by the Philippine Navy near the Second Thomas Shoal, which is part of the internationally contested Spratly Islands.

==== August 2025 collision of Chinese Coast Guard and Chinese Navy ====
On 11 August 2025, Chinese ships had chased a ship of the Philippines Coast Guard, BRP Suluan, near Scarborough Shoal, according to media; During the incident, one Chinese ship rammed into the bow section, of another Chinese ship.

=== Benham Rise ===
In March 2017, Chinese ships were spotted in the Benham Rise, a protected food supply exclusive zone of the Philippines. The Philippines, through its ambassador to Beijing has officially asked China to explain the reported presence of one of its vessels in Benham Rise in the Pacific. A week later, the Chinese Ministry of Foreign Affairs released a statement saying that China is honoring the Philippines' sovereign rights over Benham Rise, and that the ship was passing by. However, the ship was revealed to have been on the area for about three months. In May 2017, Philippine president Duterte revealed that the Chinese Communist Party leader Xi Jinping made an unveiled threat of war against the Philippines over the islands in the South China Sea during a meeting in Beijing.

In January 2018, the Department of Foreign Affairs approved the Chinese Institute of Oceanology of the Chinese Academy of Sciences to perform a scientific survey of the Rise, with the approval of President Rodrigo Duterte. In February, Duterte ordered the halting of all foreign researches in the Benham Rise; however, the research being conducted by the Chinese Academy of Sciences was already finished before the halt order. Duterte later signed an executive order renaming the Benham Rise to Philippine Rise and stressing that the rise is subject to sovereign rights and jurisdiction of the Philippines.

The International Hydrographic Organization (IHO) and the Intergovernmental Oceanographic Commission (IOC) of the UNESCO have rules wherein the entity that first discovers unnamed features underwater have the right to name those features, prompting Filipino officials to realize that China was after, not just research, but also the naming rights over the underwater features of the Philippine Rise which will be internationally recognized through UNESCO. It was later clarified by the Philippine government that all researches ongoing at the time the halting was made were officially cancelled, but the government still allows research activities in the Rise. Foreign researchers may still do research within the Rise if they apply for research activities through the Philippine government. The government is also maintaining that the Rise belongs to the Philippines. On 12 February 2018, the International Hydrographic Organization approved the names proposed by China for five features in the Philippine Rise after China submitted to the organization its research findings on the area. The Chinese naming of the features met public protests in the Philippines.

=== Claims over Palawan on Chinese social media ===
The government of the People's Republic of China does not officially claim Palawan. Agencies of the Philippine government have denounced claims that Palawan was once part of Greater China, made from early 2025 on Chinese social media.

=== 2026 diplomatic unrest ===
On 21 January 2026, the Chinese Embassy in Manila issued a series of public statements and social media posts responding to remarks by Philippine government officials and lawmakers concerning disputes in the West Philippine Sea. The embassy published multiple posts on its official platforms disputing statements made by Philippine officials and asserting China's position on maritime and legal issues related to the dispute.

The statements named several Philippine officials, including Commodore Jay Tarriela of the Philippine Coast Guard, Senators Risa Hontiveros and Kiko Pangilinan, and Representatives Leila de Lima and Chel Diokno. Embassy posts accused these officials of spreading misinformation, misinterpreting international law, or politicizing maritime issues. In particular, the embassy's deputy spokesperson publicly responded to remarks by Hontiveros, describing them as political rhetoric and stating that freedom of expression should not be used to defame foreign leaders.

On 23 January 2026, 1Sambayan called on the Philippine government to take a stronger approach against what it described as problematic rhetoric from the Chinese Embassy in Manila, including considering the declaration of certain embassy personnel persona non grata.

Philippine officials and lawmakers reacted by criticizing the embassy's statements. Senator Hontiveros urged the Department of Foreign Affairs (DFA) to address what she described as attacks by the Chinese mission, while other lawmakers defended their statements as part of their constitutional duties and expressions of concern over national sovereignty. Senator Pangilinan also publicly condemned the tone of the embassy's responses and called on the DFA to lodge formal diplomatic protests.

Other Philippine officials similarly criticized the embassy's remarks. Senator Erwin Tulfo stated that foreign diplomatic missions should respect freedom of speech in the Philippines and refrain from publicly admonishing Philippine officials for statements made in defense of national interests.

The DFA reiterated support for Philippine officials defending the country's sovereignty and stated that differences between states are best addressed through established diplomatic channels rather than public exchanges.

On 14 March 2026, in response to recent remarks by Jay Tarriela, the Chinese Embassy in Manila presented a 1990 letter from Bienvenido Tan Jr., former Philippine ambassador to Germany, addressed to German radio operator Dieter Löffler, which it said supports China's claims on the Scarborough Shoal. According to the embassy, the letter stated that "According to the Philippine National Mapping and Resource Information Authority, the Scarborough Reef or Huangyan Dao does not fall within the territorial sovereignty of the Philippines." Two days later, the Foreign Ministry of the Philippines spokesperson, Rogelio Villanueva, rejected the assertion of the Chinese embassy that the then-diplomat Tan admitted that Scarborough Shoal was not part of Philippine territory.

In October 2026, the Philippine president criticized what was described as a "thinly veiled threat" of military force by the Chinese ambassador Jing Quan. The next month, Presidential Spokesperson Claire Castro told the government officials to continue the mandate on defending the Philippine sovereignty over the disputed waters, but adviced using "diplomatic language" and that the president still preferred diplomacy in dealing with the tensions. The Department of Foreign Affairs earlier asserted that the "President is the chief architect of Philippine foreign policy".

In a November 2026 report by The Philippine Star, Defense Secretary Gibo Teodoro cautioned the Filipinos who are visiting China to "not be brainwashed" while "enjoying their beautiful culture".

==== China Daily AI-generated video controversy ====
In July 2026, the Department of Foreign Affairs denounced an AI-generated video by Chinese state media outlet China Daily that portrayed Filipinos as monkeys, calling it racist and dehumanizing propaganda. Two leading Chinese Filipino groups, Kaisa Para sa Kaunlaran and Federation of Filipino Chinese Chambers of Commerce and Industry, Inc. (FFCCCII), also condemned the video, with FFCCCII president Victor Lim demanding its immediate takedown and Kaisa Para sa Kaunlaran calling for a "sincere apology" from the Chinese outlet.

China Daily defended the video claiming it as satire directed at Philippine political figures and their policies rather than Filipinos as a national or ethnic group. China's Ministry of Foreign Affairs said that the video was not an official act of the Chinese government and did not represent its official position.

=== Censorship ===
In July 2025, tensions between China and the Philippines deepened after China attempted to block the screening of Food Delivery: Fresh from the West Philippine Sea, a documentary highlighting the challenges faced by Filipino fishermen and the Philippine Coast Guard amid Chinese interference in the West Philippine Sea. Originally set to premiere in the Philippines, the film was reportedly withdrawn due to "external forces" and later debuted at the Doc Edge Festival in Auckland, where China's embassy and consulate requested the cancellation of future screenings, calling the film a distortion of facts and a tool of "Philippine propaganda". The Philippine government condemned the move, viewing it as an act of censorship, with National Security Adviser Eduardo Año saying that “The use of diplomatic pressure to demand the cancellation of the documentary’s screening represents a blatant attempt to silence a powerful narrative that exposes the truth about the situation in the West Philippine Sea and the daily realities faced by Filipino fisherfolk“.

== COVID-19 pandemic ==
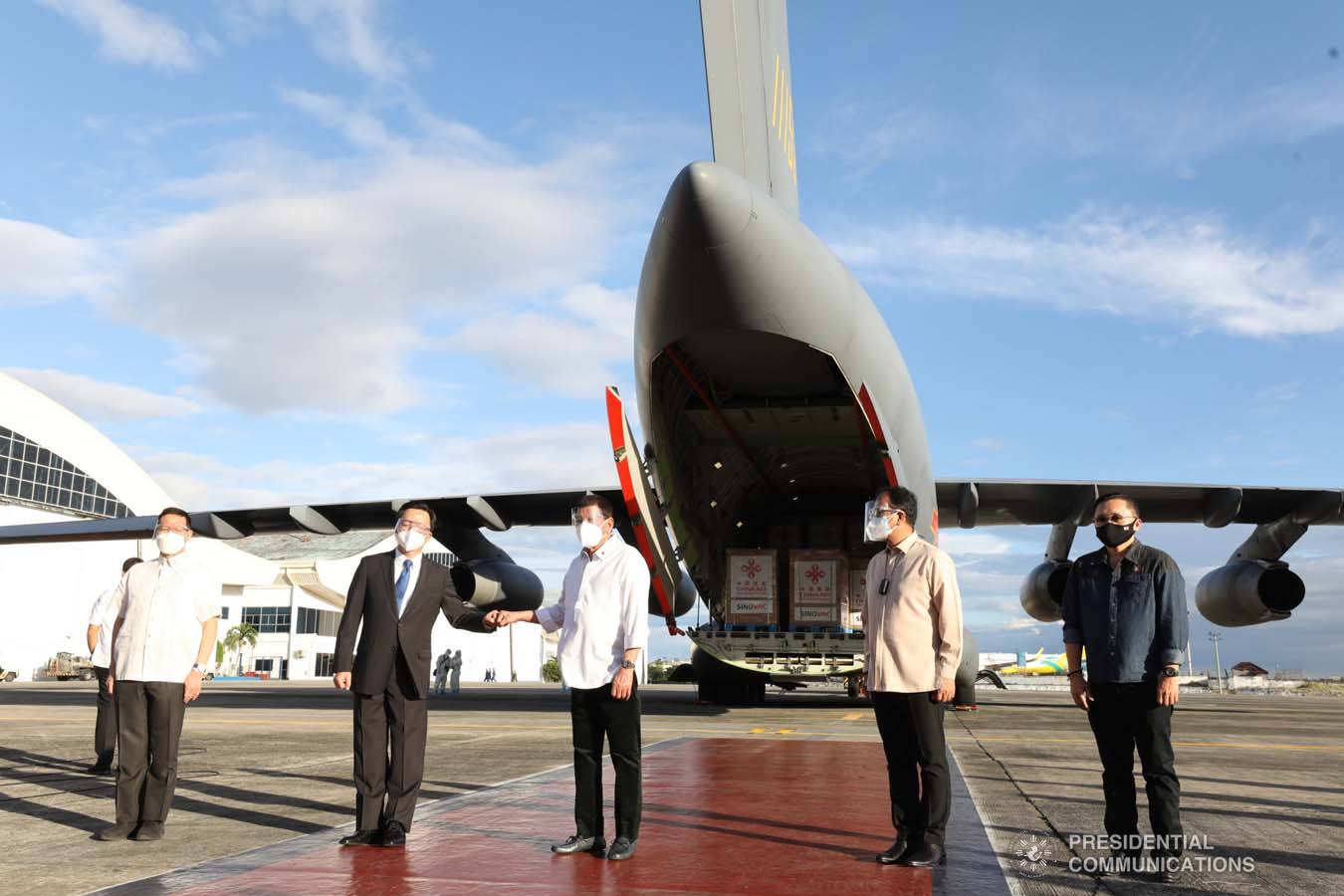
Philippine President Rodrigo Duterte (center) with Chinese Ambassador Huang Xilian during the ceremonial turnover of CoronaVac vaccines in Villamor Air Base, Pasay City on 28 February 2021.

China played an important role in the early months of the Philippines' response to COVID-19. In February 2021, China became the first country to send the Philippines COVID-19 vaccines, following President Rodrigo Duterte's request for assistance from Chinese leader Xi Jinping in securing vaccines.

A June 2024 Reuters investigative report later revealed that the United States allegedly launched at the height of the pandemic a clandestine campaign to undermine China's growing influence in the Philippines and to erode Filipinos' public trust on China's Sinovac vaccine, face masks, and testing kits, thereby causing economic damage and putting innocent lives at risk.

== National security concerns in the Philippines ==
Amid escalating tensions in the South China Sea during the Bongbong Marcos administration in April 2024, the National Intelligence Coordinating Agency and the National Bureau of Investigation announced that they would investigate an influx of over a thousand Chinese students enrolled in private universities in Cagayan, a province facing Taiwan, most of whom were not attending classes, according to the Bureau of Immigration. Several universities and colleges in Cagayan rejected the allegations, and called the national security concerns regarding the Chinese students influx as a "blatant display of racism and Sinophobia". The Commission on Higher Education later stated that most foreign students in the Philippines were Indians and not Chinese, adding that most Chinese students in the country as of Academic Year 2022–2023 were in the National Capital Region, followed by Cagayan Valley. Bloomberg News reported that the Chinese government has invested heavily in Cagayan and attempted to woo local political elites.

In May 2024, the mayor of Bamban, Tarlac, Alice Guo, faced a senate inquiry after she was linked to an earlier Philippine Offshore Gaming Operator (POGO) raid; she was also suspected by Senator Risa Hontiveros of being a "Chinese asset", and was described by President Bongbong Marcos as not being known to most politicians in Tarlac. In June 2024, the National Bureau of Investigation confirmed that the fingerprints of Alice Guo matches with Chinese national Guo Hua Ping. In July 2024, the Senate of the Philippines issued an arrest order for Guo and some of her family members for failing to attend a second consecutive hearing. Guo subsequently fled the country, but was subsequently captured in Indonesia and returned to the Philippines. The Economist wrote in July 2026 that Guo was unlikely to be a spy, noting that the claims have not been backed by persuasive evidence and that the Chinese government has a negative view of scammers, who often target Chinese citizens. The newspaper added that the fact that Guo escaped to Southeast Asia rather than China was further evidence that she was not a spy.

In July 2024, Romeo Brawner Jr. stated that China is using a united front strategy to attempt to "influence various sectors in our society, including the education sector, business, even the media, and local government units." He cited POGOs as an aspect of that strategy. On 22 July 2024, President Marcos announced the nationwide ban of POGOs in his State of the Nation Address due to numerous security concerns. In August 2024, Rappler reported that the Manila bureau chief of Wenhui Bao from 2021 until 2024, Zhang "Steve" Song, was an undercover Ministry of State Security (MSS) operative who worked closely with Huawei and gathered intelligence about the internal dynamics and politics of key personalities in the country's defense and security sectors.

In January 2025, Philippine police arrested Deng Yuanqing, a Chinese national affiliated with the Army Engineering University of the People's Liberation Army on suspicion of espionage. China's foreign ministry spokesperson Mao Ning responded to the allegations of Chinese spies saying that the Philippines should make statements "based on facts" and to stop "making false claims and hyping up so-called Chinese spies". She then urged the country to protect the rights of Chinese citizens in the Philippines. The same month, Philippine authorities arrested suspected Chinese spies posing as Taiwanese tourists, recording the activities of Philippine Coast Guard ships in Palawan. In February 2025, the National Bureau of Investigation arrested two Chinese nationals for allegedly spying on Malacañang Palace. In March 2025, Philippine authorities announced they had uncovered an alleged spy ring involving hundreds of Chinese nationals in the country.

In April 2025, the Philippines expressed concern over China's arrest of three Filipinos on espionage charges, calling the accusations retaliatory and baseless. Chinese authorities alleged the individuals were working for Philippine intelligence to gather military information, claiming they had confessed. However, the Philippines' National Security Council stated the three were former scholars who had studied in Hainan under a bilateral program with Palawan, and denied any military ties.

In April 2025, Senator Francis Tolentino presented evidence in a Senate hearing linking the Chinese Embassy in Manila to the operation of troll farms through a contract with Infinitus Marketing Solutions. He revealed a signed service agreement and a corresponding payment, alleging the effort was part of a covert disinformation campaign targeting the Philippine government and public. On July 1, 2025, China sanctioned former Philippine senator Francis Tolentino, barring him from mainland China, Hong Kong, and Macau over his stance on South China Sea issues. Beijing cited his “egregious conduct” and opposition to Chinese interests, including authoring the Philippine Maritime Zones Act and leading a probe into alleged Chinese espionage. The move, announced a day after his term ended, is the first of its kind against a Philippine political figure. Tolentino dismissed the sanction as a “badge of honour” and reaffirmed his commitment to national sovereignty.

In March 2026, Philippine authorities arrested three Filipino nationals, suspected of spying for China. In May 2026, at the Shangri-La Dialogue, Philippine defense secretary Gilbert Teodoro said that the Philippines was "under severe threat territory-wise and politically too by China." The Chinese government subsequently sanctioned Teodoro, his spouse, and child. In July 2026, the Department of National Defense stated that foreign state-backed education programs needed further scrutiny following a report of Jinan University serving as the primary training destination for Chinese-Filipino schools.

=== Cyber crime ===
On February 27, 2025, Philippine authorities arrested over 400 people, including 207 Chinese nationals, in a raid on a suspected cybercrime hub in Pasay. The individuals were accused of involvement in illegal online gambling and various scams, including cryptocurrency, romance, and investment frauds. Despite a crackdown ordered by Philippine President Bongbong Marcos in 2024, these operations have continued, with many relocating to other Southeast Asian countries. The arrests highlight the ongoing issue of cybercrime in the region, with China's strict anti-gambling laws fueling some of these illicit operations.

=== Election interference ===
In 2025, allegations of election interference by the Chinese government were widely reported. During a hearing of the Senate's special panel on maritime and admiralty zones in April 2025, the National Security Council said that there are indicators that the Chinese government is interfering in the 2025 Philippine general election including discrediting candidates critical of it and supporting candidates who sympathize with China. China's foreign ministry spokesperson Guo Jiakun dismissed these reports.

The National Intelligence Coordinating Agency (NICA) also claimed that Chinese agents were "amplifying divisive political discourse" in the Philippines in coordination with local proxies. NICA alleged that the Chinese embassy in Manila have paid InfinitUs Marketing Solutions in 2023 for a troll farm on Facebook and Twitter to spread disinformation and promote Chinese state interests.

== Safety concerns from China ==
In 2025, China had made four travel advisories about the Philippines over the course of five months since April. In April 2025, Anson Que, Chinese-Filipino businessman and CEO of Elison Steel was kidnapped and murdered, with his body being found in Rizal province. The Chinese embassy, that same month, made a safety warning citing "harassment of Chinese individuals and businesses," however, did not specify cases for the advisory. The safety advisory from the embassy also came at a time during arrests made against Chinese nationals for espionage cases. The Malacañang Palace later denied the embassy's harassment claims. In July 2025, China's Education Ministry issued a safety warning for Chinese nationals studying in the Philippines due to criminal incidents targeting them. The Education Ministry also issued travel advisories for Chinese students in April and August citing security concerns. On August 30, China's Foreign Ministry issued a travel warning for its citizens due to "worsening" crime rates in the Philippines. The travel warning was refuted by the Philippines stating that crime rates in the country has declined. Carl Baker of the Pacific Forum stated that China's travel advisories on the Philippines "overstate the risk associated with ordinary tourist and business travel."

== Public opinions ==
=== Chinese public opinion ===
According to a 2026 feeling thermometer poll by the Carter Center and Emory University, Chinese opinion of the Philippines was on average 27 out of 100. The same poll also showed 43% of the Chinese respondents agreed to China "ceding" the South China Sea territories to the Philippines "if Manila ended its mutual defense treaty with the United States in favor of non-alignment".

=== Filipino public opinion ===
China remains not trustworthy among the majority of the Filipinos. A December 2025 OCTA Research survey showed 60% of the respondents did not trust China, as opposed to 13% who answered they did. 79% of the respondents selected China as "the greatest threat to the Philippines", which the polling firm said was "a five-percentage point increase from 74 percent in July 2025".

In a Pulse Asia survey conducted in late February 2026, only 3% of the Filipino respondents supported a prospective state visit of Chinese leader Xi Jinping to the Philippines. 68% of the respondents supported the continuation of the transparency initiative against Chinese harassment of the Filipino fishermen and authorities, while 28% opposed it. Support for the initiative was highest among respondents in both Luzon and Metro Manila and lowest among the respondents in the Visayas.

A survey published in 2026 by the Pew Research Center found that 40% of Filipinos had a favorable view of China, while 57% had an unfavorable view. It also found that 47% of Filipinos in the 18-35 age group had positive opinions of China.

== Resident diplomatic missions ==
of China in the Philippines

- Makati (Embassy)
- Cebu City (Consulate-General)
- Davao City (Consulate-General)
- Laoag (Consulate-General)

of the Philippines in China

- Beijing (Embassy)
- Chongqing (Consulate-General)
- Guangzhou (Consulate-General)
- Hong Kong (Consulate-General)
- Macau (Consulate-General)
- Shanghai (Consulate-General)
- Xiamen (Consulate-General)

== See also ==
=== China ===
- List of diplomatic missions in China
- List of diplomatic missions of China

=== Philippines ===
- List of diplomatic missions in the Philippines
- List of diplomatic missions of the Philippines
