= Devon Bay =

Singaporean cargo vessel

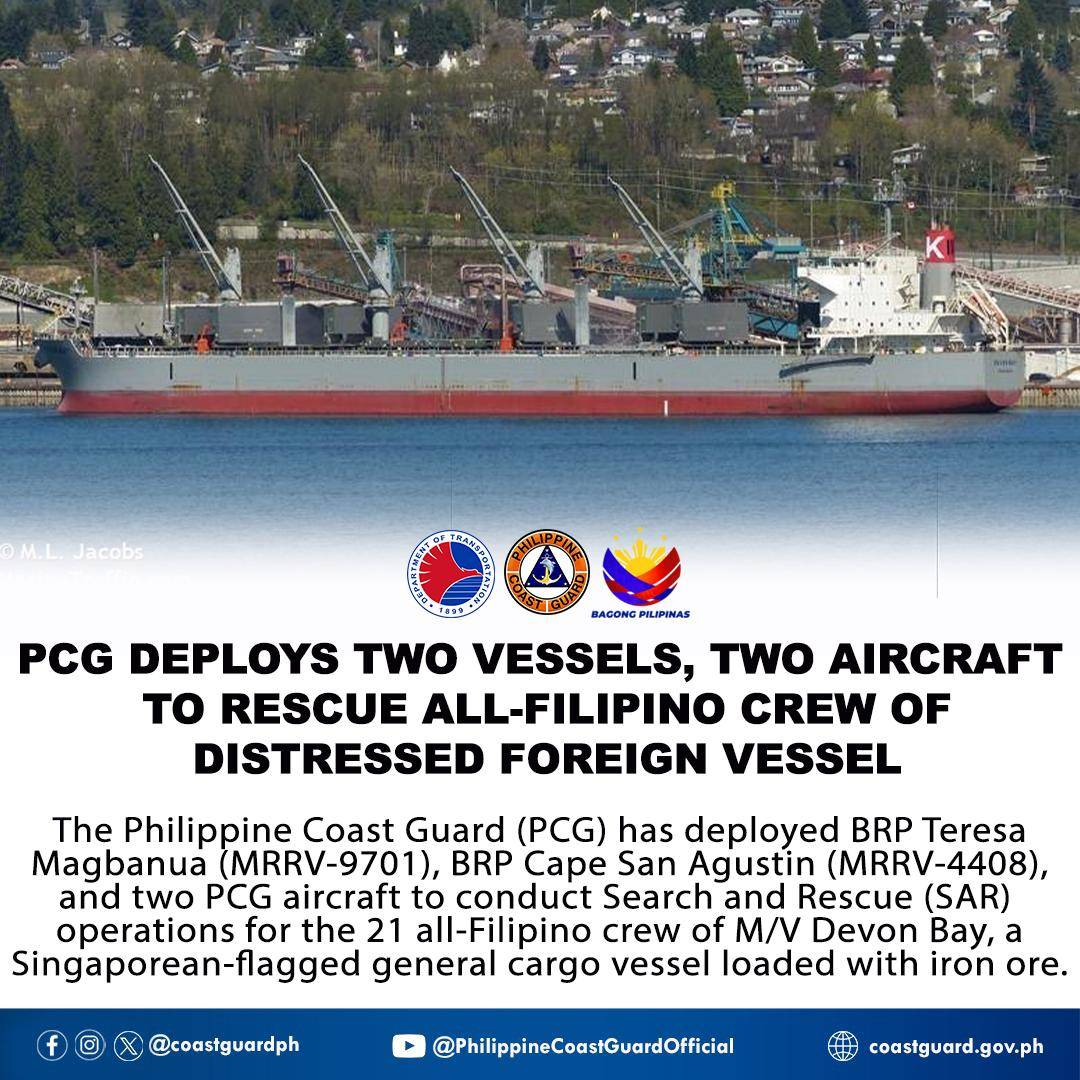
- A post released by the Philippine Coast Guard about search and rescue operations with a photo of the ship

History

Singapore
- Name: Devon Bay
- Operator: K Line
- Builder: Mitsui E&S
- Yard number: 1843
- Launched: 15 March 2013
- Completed: 1 July 2013
- Out of service: 23 January 2026
- Fate: Capsized and sank

General characteristics
- Class & type: Mitsui 56 series bulk carrier
- Tonnage: 31,756 GT; 56,095 DWT
- Length: 189.99 m (623 ft 4 in)
- Beam: 32.25 m (105 ft 10 in)
- Depth: 18.10 m (59 ft 5 in)
- Decks: 1
- Speed: 16.5 kn (30.6 km/h; 19.0 mph) max speed, 14.5 kn (26.9 km/h; 16.7 mph) cruising speed
- Capacity: 28
- Crew: 21

Devon Bay was a Singaporean bulk carrier that was built in 2013 and serviced Asia. On January 23, 2026, the vessel capsized and sank in the South China Sea near the disputed atoll of Scarborough Shoal after the cargo it was carrying shifted to one side of the vessel during bad weather. Six crew members were killed and 15 were rescued.

== Description ==
Devon Bay was a Singaporean-flagged bulk carrier owned by Japanese shipping company K Line. It was launched on 15 March 2013 and was completed by Mitsui E&S on 1 July 2013. It was 189.99 m (623 ft 4 in) long and 32.25 m (105 ft 10 in) wide, with a capacity of 28 crew members. The max speed of the vessel was 16.5 kn (30.6 km/h; 19.0 mph), while the normal speed was 14.5 kn (26.9 km/h; 16.7 mph).

== Sinking ==
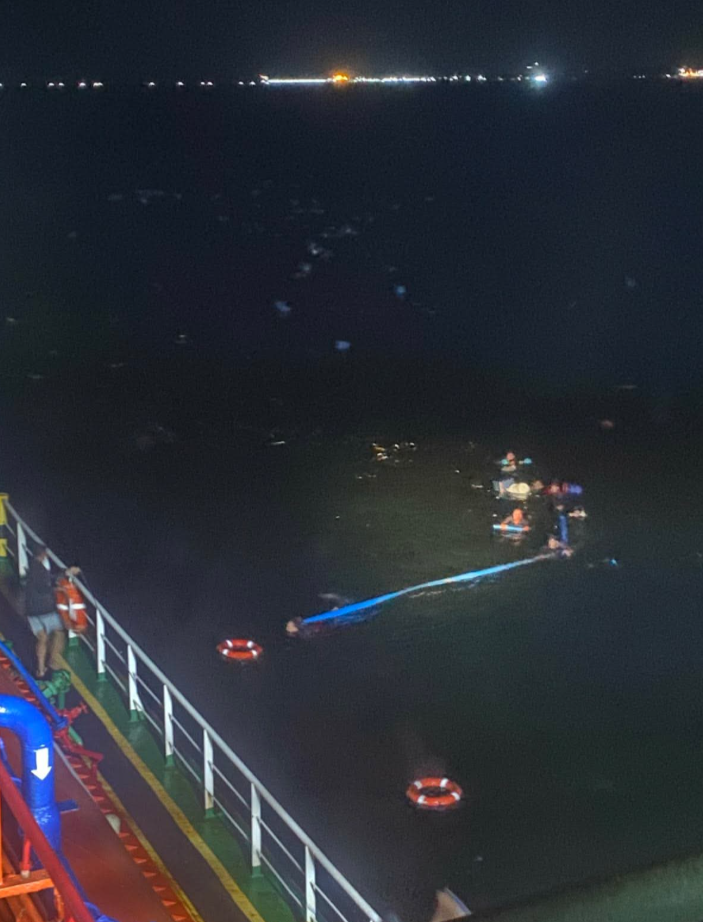
Search and rescue operations by the Philippine Coast Guard

The vessel was loaded with 55,000 tons of nickel ore en route from Zamboanga del Sur to Yangjiang, China, when contact was lost approximately 141 nautical miles off Pangasinan, Philippines, on 22 January at around 8:30 p.m. local time. An SOS signal was received by the Chinese Coast Guard (CCG) at 1:34 a.m. on 23 January that the vessel had capsized in the South China Sea approximately 55 nautical miles off Scarborough Shoal. Two CCG vessels were dispatched, including one that rescued 10 crew members. The PCG also dispatched two vessels and two aircraft. Out of the 21 crew members on board at the time of the sinking, two died, four were reported missing, including the captain, and 15 were rescued, including one receiving emergency medical treatment. The 14 other crew members were reported to be in stable condition. The survivors and deceased victims were recovered by the BRP Teresa Magbanua. Search and rescue (SAR) operations concluded on February 1, and the four missing crew members were presumed dead.

The Maritime and Port Authority of Singapore confirmed it was investigating. According to the PCG, cargo liquefaction may have caused shifting in the weight of the load, forcing the vessel to tilt to one side and capsize.

K Line said they are deeply grateful to the Philippines and China Coast Guards, the co-ordinating rescue centers and all the vessels and crew that assisted in SAR operations. They also extended condolences to the families of the victims.

== See also ==
- Sinking of MV Trisha Kerstin 3 – another shipwreck in the Philippines which occurred 3 days later
