= 2025 Chinese coast guard and navy ship collision =

Maritime event in the South China Sea

- Part of the territorial disputes in the South China Sea
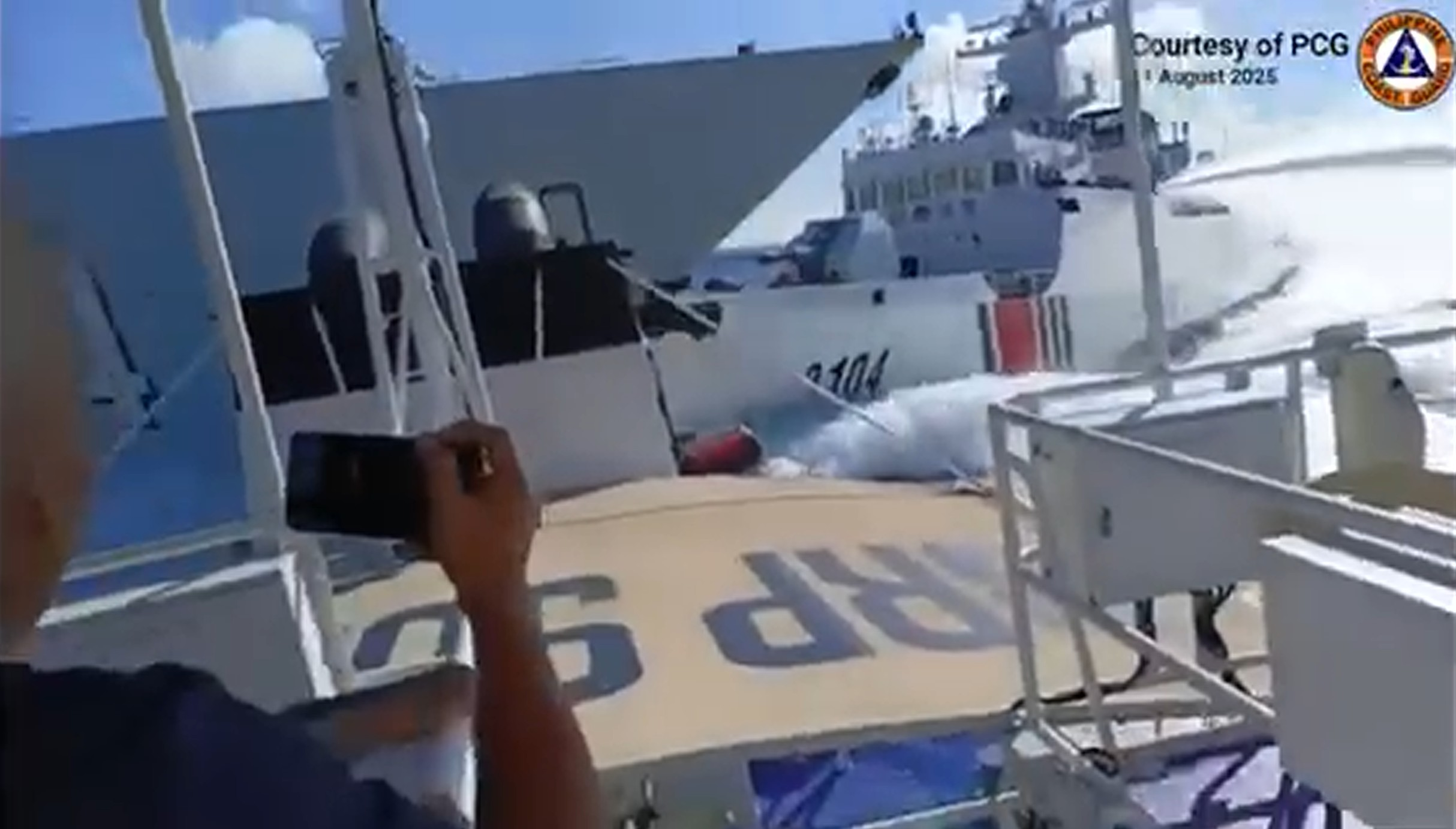
- The moment of collision between Guilin (left) and 3104 (right).
Date	Around 8:00 am (UTC+8), August 11, 2025
Location	Near Scarborough Shoal, South China Sea 15°07′N 117°46′E
Result	Severe damage to a China Coast Guard cutter and damage to a People's Liberation Army Navy destroyer; heightened tensions between the Philippines and China

Belligerents
Philippines	China

Units involved
Philippine Coast Guard: BRP Suluan (MRRV-4406); BRP Teresa Magbanua (MRRV-9701)	China Coast Guard; People's Liberation Army Navy Type 052D destroyer China Coast Guard ship 3104

Casualties and losses
None	1 China Coast Guard vessel (Chinese cutter Jiangdao 3104) rendered inoperable 3 China Coast Guard personnel killed (Philippine claim); 2 China Coast Guard personnel killed (confirmed by China)

On August 11, 2025, a maritime incident occurred near Scarborough Shoal in the South China Sea, in which a China Coast Guard vessel and a People's Liberation Army Navy warship collided while pursuing a Philippine Coast Guard patrol vessel. The incident, which was captured on video and released by the Philippine government, has triggered renewed tensions in the ongoing territorial disputes in the South China Sea.

The two casualties, both of whom were China Coast Guard personnel, were never officially acknowledged by China until a year later.

== Background ==
According to the Philippine Coast Guard, its vessel, BRP Suluan, was conducting a routine patrol near Scarborough Shoal when several China Coast Guard and People's Liberation Army Navy ships began maneuvering aggressively. The Chinese vessels reportedly sought to obstruct and expel the Philippine vessel from the reef.

== The incident ==
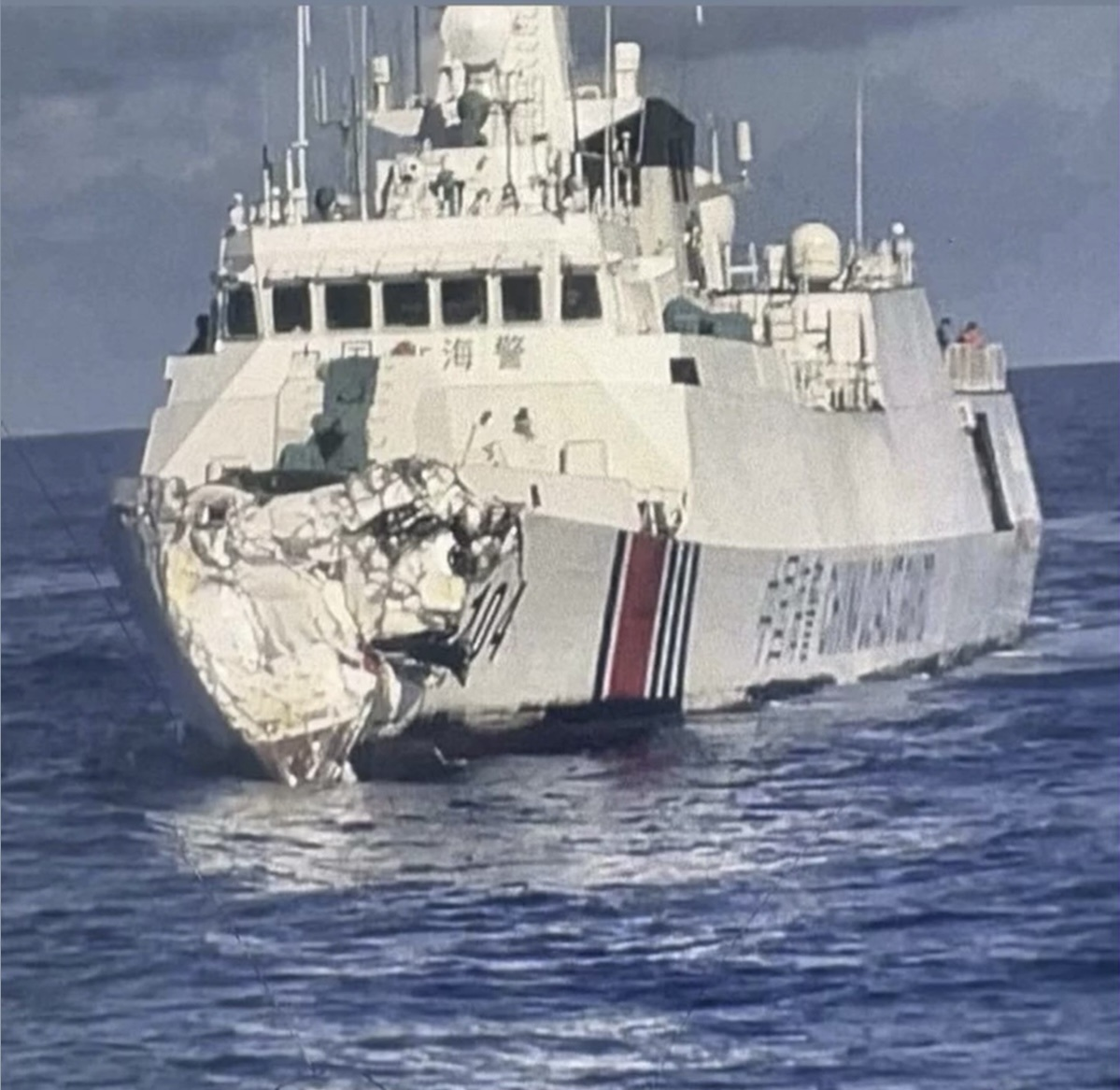
The bow of China Coast Guard vessel 3104 sustained heavy damage

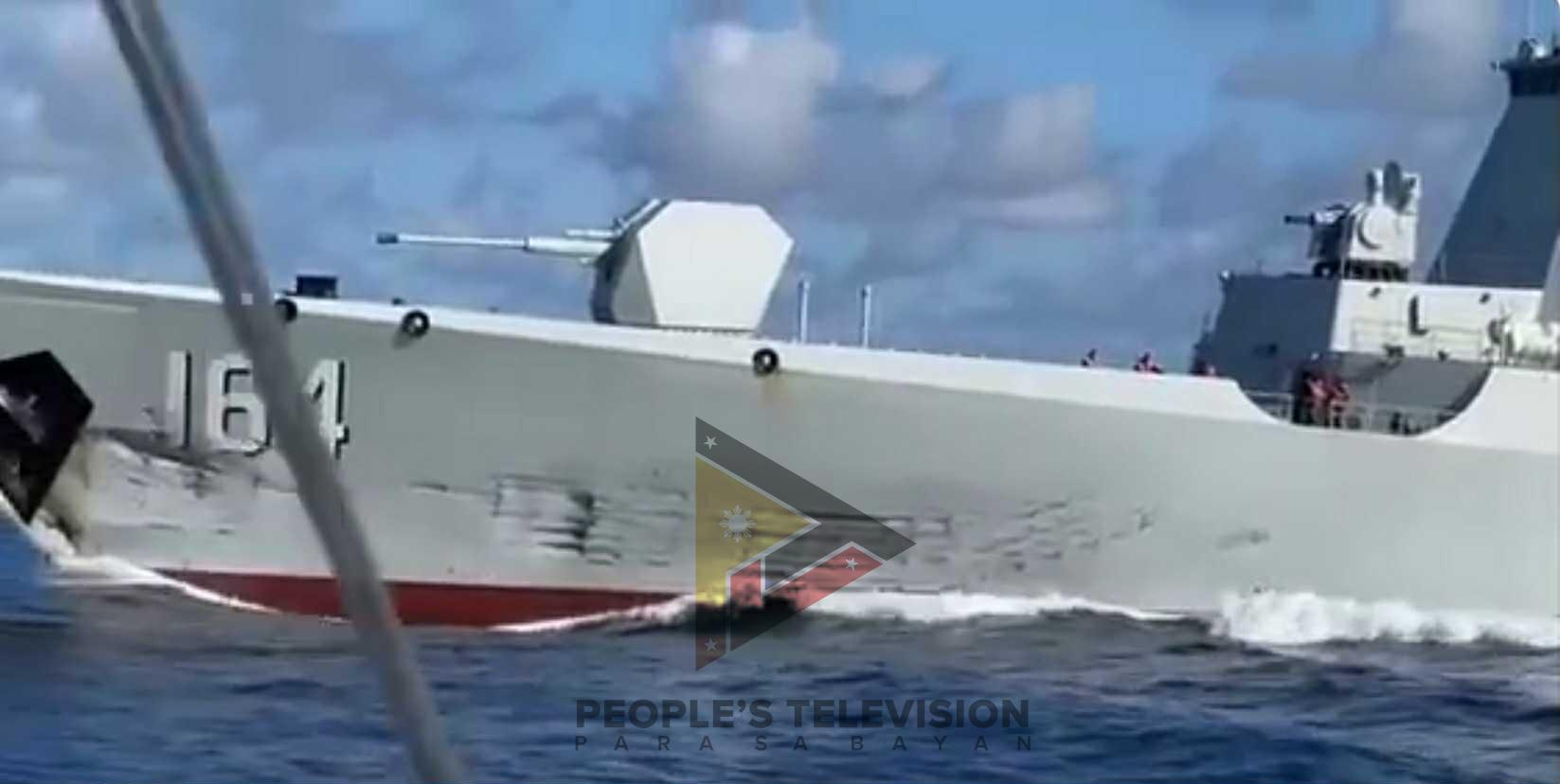
The Type 052D destroyer Guilin showing dents and multiple scrape marks on its port side

The Philippine Coast Guard patrol vessel Suluan recorded the video, which showed the collision between Guilin and China Coast Guard 3104 at the 0:58 mark

During a resupply mission, the Philippine vessel encountered a naval maneuver carried out by the China Coast Guard and the People's Liberation Army Navy. According to Philippine Coast Guard spokesperson Jay Tarriela, Suluan was targeted with water cannon blasts and chased by China Coast Guard vessel 3104. The entire operation was documented by Philippine Coast Guard personnel and accompanying journalists using various cameras. The footage shows the Chinese Navy Type 052D destroyer Guilin and China Coast Guard cutter 3104 attempting to block Suluan, which evaded them by passing between the two vessels.

Prior to the collision, Suluan veered to the right, while China Coast Guard 3104 followed closely from behind on its port side. Guilin first made a sharp turn to the right, then swung to the left in an attempt to block Suluan's course. However, Suluan accelerated and also turned left, narrowly avoiding Guilin's stern. 3104, unable to maneuver in time, struck Guilin at high speed.

Images released by the Philippines show crew members aboard China Coast Guard 3104 attempting to place fenders at the bow shortly before the impact, but these proved insufficient to prevent the collision. The crash caused extensive damage to the bow and forecastle of 3104, with its hull crumpling inward by approximately 10 meters (33 ft), rendering the ship inoperable. Guilin sustained lesser damage, though visible scrapes and dents were apparent on its port side.

After the collision, Guilin did not assist the disabled 3104 and instead continued its pursuit of Suluan. The operation was considered highly dangerous. Later, the Philippines stated, "We express our concern for the Chinese sailors who may have been injured."

Based on the video released by the Philippine government, while 3104 was pursuing Suluan, it suddenly collided with the People's Liberation Army Navy warship. The crash resulted in severe damage to the Chinese coast guard vessel, leaving it unable to sail. In response to individuals who had fallen overboard and the collision itself, the Philippine Coast Guard redirected the mission of BRP Teresa Magbanua and contacted 3104 via radio to offer search-and-rescue and medical assistance, but received no reply. Roughly an hour later, the People's Liberation Army Navy and the China Coast Guard initiated their own search-and-rescue operations. The People's Liberation Army Navy Type 903 replenishment ship Honghu arrived to assist, along with several militia vessels, in a search-and-rescue effort conducted 15–25 nautical miles (28–46 km; 17–29 mi) east of the reef. After the operation, Suluan returned to Manila.

Initially, no casualties were reported on either side, but the Philippines condemned the Chinese vessels' "dangerous maneuvers and unlawful interference". Almost a year later, China's People's Armed Police confirmed two China Coast Guard personnel deaths during the incident.

== Aftermath ==
On August 11, Philippine Coast Guard spokesperson Jay Tarriela said "The (China Coast Guard vessel) CCG 3104, which was chasing the (Filipino coast guard vessel) BRP Suluan at high speed, performed a risky maneuvre from the (Philippine) vessel's starboard quarter, leading to the impact with the PLA (People's Liberation Army) Navy warship. This resulted in substantial damage to the CCG vessel's forecastle, rendering it unseaworthy." He said that the Chinese crew "never responded" to the Filipino ship's offer of assistance and that earlier in the confrontation, the BRP Suluan was "targeted with a water cannon" by the Chinese but "successfully" evaded it.

On August 11, Gan Yu, spokesperson for the China Coast Guard, claimed that the Philippines had dispatched several coast guard and government vessels near Scarborough Shoal under the pretext of resupplying fishing boats. According to him, despite repeated persuasion and warnings from China, the China Coast Guard took "lawful measures" to drive them away. He emphasized that China would defend its territorial sovereignty and maritime rights, describing the actions as "professional, standard, and legitimate." He also stated that the Philippine vessels had already been expelled from the waters near Scarborough Shoal, but did not mention the collision.

On August 12, the Philippines Department of Foreign Affairs issued a statement stressing that "their [China's] actions not only posed a serious threat to Philippine personnel and vessels, but also resulted in the unfortunate collision of two Chinese ships." The statement further noted: "In recognition of its duty to provide assistance during maritime disasters and in carrying out missions within its jurisdiction, the Philippines promptly expressed readiness to provide medical aid and other support, including the possible towing of the disabled China Coast Guard vessel to ensure the safety of other ships in the area."

On August 12, Admiral Ronnie Gil Gavan, Commandant of the Philippine Coast Guard, awarded the Coast Guard Bronze Cross Medal and Ribbon to the 42 crew members of BRP Suluan in recognition of their active and courageous service. Captain Jomark Angue was awarded the Coast Guard Distinguished Service Medal and Ribbon.

=== Censorship in China regarding the incident ===
On China's social media platform Weibo, a military news account titled “Marine Equipment and Public Service Ship Information” posted an image of three candles, suggesting that three individuals may have died. Meanwhile, with China's military parade approaching on 3 September, authorities restricted news about the reportedly embarrassing incident on national social media platforms to reduce discussion, and state media made no reports about it. Some military analysts nonetheless suggested that "this provides an opportunity to assess their true capabilities".

== Reactions ==
CNN reported that while the incident could be seen as "embarrassing" for the Chinese military, the potential escalation of tensions instead became a "fortunate" reminder that the vessel had collided with its own ship. According to Ray Powell, an expert on South China Sea issues and director of the Light of the Ocean project at the Center for National Security Innovation at Stanford University, the Philippines is a treaty ally of the United States under an international agreement. He noted that if the excessive maneuver had resulted in the deaths of Philippine crew members—considering the significant disparity in size between the two vessels, which could have caused the immediate sinking of the Philippine ship—such an outcome might be regarded as an intentional injury and interpreted as an "act of war." This would constitute grounds for international legal intervention, sanctions, and embargoes. The United States and the Philippines signed the Mutual Defense Treaty in 1951. Regarding the collision between the Chinese military and coast guard vessels, U.S. Ambassador to the Philippines Mary Kay Loss Carlson stated: "Condemn China's latest reckless action against the 'Suluan' and praise the professionalism of the Philippine Coast Guard." The European Union also called on China to adhere to agreements, including the United Nations Convention on the Law of the Sea.

The Chinese government denied responsibility, accusing the Philippines of "provocation" and "territorial intrusion." Meanwhile, the Philippines received statements of support from US allies Japan, Australia, and New Zealand, as well as from the United States themselves.

On August 13, 2025, the United States deployed two warships near Scarborough Shoal to demonstrate support and to ensure freedom of navigation in the area.
