= BRP Teresa Magbanua =

Philippine Coast Guard vessel

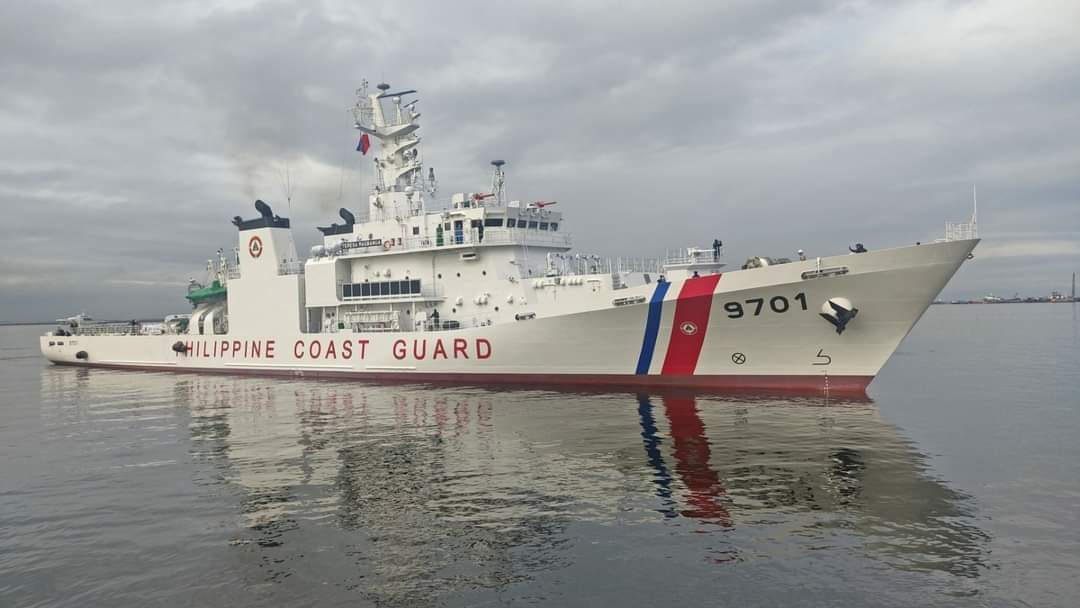
- BRP Teresa Magbanua (MRRV-9701)

History

Philippines
- Name: BRP Teresa Magbanua
- Namesake: Teresa Magbanua
- Ordered: February 7, 2020
- Builder: Mitsubishi Shipbuilding Co., Ltd.
- Cost: 14.55 billion yen for two units
- Launched: July 26, 2021
- Acquired: February 21, 2022
- Commissioned: May 6, 2022
- Identification: IMO number: 9908669; MMSI number: 548897700; Callsign: 4DJF8; Hull number: 9701
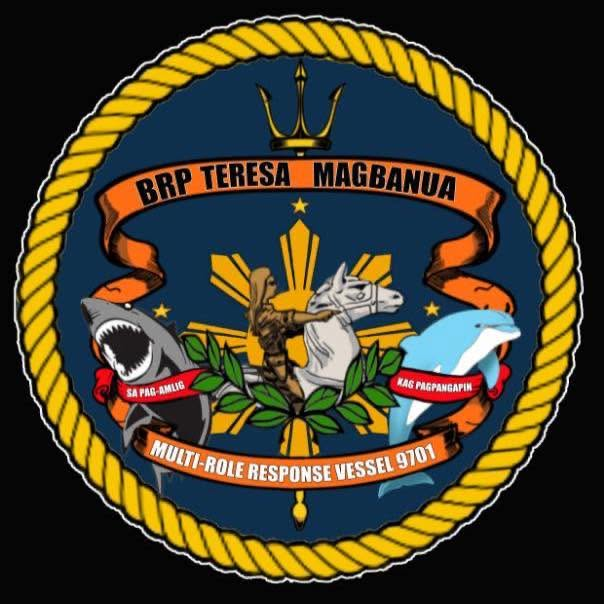
- Badge

General characteristics
- Length: 96.6 m (316 ft 11 in)
- Beam: 11.5 m (37 ft 9 in)
- Draft: 4.3 m (14 ft 1 in)
- Propulsion: 2 × diesel engines, with total output of 13,200 kW (17,700 shp)
- Speed: 24 knots (44 km/h) maximum sustained
- Range: 4,000 nmi (7,400 km) at 12 knots (22 km/h; 14 mph)
- Endurance: more than 15 days
- Boats & landing craft carried: 2 × RHIB
- Complement: 67 officers and sailors max
- Armament: To be determined
- Aircraft carried: 1 × Airbus H145 helicopter
- Aviation facilities: Hangar and flight deck for 1 × Airbus H145 helicopter

BRP Teresa Magbanua (MRRV-9701) is the lead ship of her class of patrol vessels operated by the Philippine Coast Guard (PCG). The service officially classifies her as a multi-role response vessel (MRRV). She is one of the largest, and most modern vessels of the PCG.

She is named after Teresa Magbanua, a Filipino schoolteacher who participated in all three resistance movements in Philippine history: against Spain (in the Philippine Revolution), the United States (in the Philippine–American War), and Japan (in World War II).

== Construction and design ==
She was constructed by Mitsubishi Shipbuilding Co. Ltd in Shimonoseki, Japan based on the Kunigami-class patrol vessels. The contract was under the "Maritime Safety Capability Improvement Project Phase 2" project of the Department of Transportation in 2016. The deal was worth 14.55 billion yen for two units from a JICA STEP Loan of 16.455 billion yen and was signed on February 7, 2020.

Teresa Magbanua has a length of 96.6 meters (316 ft 11 in), a maximum speed of not less than 24 knots (44 km/h; 28 mph), and has a complement of 67 officers and crew. She is powered by two 6,600-kilowatt (8,900 hp) diesel engines. The vessel has a helideck, as well as a hangar that can accommodate the H145 helicopter used by the PCG. She is also equipped with a hyperbaric chamber to support divers and a survivor room that can house people rescued after an accident.

The first steel cutting ceremony happened on December 18, 2020. She was launched on July 26, 2021. The vessel underwent sea trials conducted by the shipbuilder and the PCG in late 2021. The ship sailed on February 21, 2022 in a ceremony overseen by representatives from the Philippine Embassy, Mitsubishi Shipbuilding Co. Ltd., Nippon Kaiji Kyokai, and Japan Coast Guard. She arrived at Manila on February 26, 2022.

== History ==
On May 6, 2022, the vessel was commissioned by the Philippine Coast Guard.

On May 12, 2024, the Teresa Magbanua, along with BRP Cabra and BRP Malabrigo, was sent to Escoda Shoal – a sandbank located 75 nautical miles (139 km; 86 mi) from the coastline of Palawan – to monitor the activities of the China Coast Guard (CCG) in the area. On August 31, she was damaged after being rammed three times by a CCG vessel while anchored near Escoda Shoal. The vessel returned to port on September 15 due to lack of supplies – resupply attempts having been prevented by Chinese vessels, unfavorable weather, and the damage from the ramming incident. Four crew members were subsequently treated for dehydration.

On June 13, 2025, the Teresa Magbanua made a visit to Kagoshima, where Japan Coast Guard officers interacted with their Philippine counterparts during the port call.

On July 12, 2025, the Teresa Magbanua intercepted the Chinese Type 815G electronic surveillance ship Tianwangxing (793) and its escort, the CCG cutter 4203, approximately 70 nautical miles (130 km; 81 mi) west of the Philippine archipelago while on a maritime law enforcement patrol. The vessel issued radio challenges, which were ignored by the Chinese Navy ship, prompting a counter-challenge from the escort asserting Chinese jurisdiction. In a statement, Commodore Jay Tarriela described the interception as a “proactive response,” underscoring the ship's role in asserting Philippine jurisdiction within its exclusive economic zone and monitoring unauthorized foreign military activity.

On April 30, 2025, Japanese Prime Minister Shigeru Ishiba visited the ship and her crew during his trip to the Philippines.

On August 11, 2025, the Teresa Magbanua, along with BRP Suluan, accompanied the M/V Pamamalakaya to conduct the “Kadiwa Para sa Bagong Bayaning Mangingisda (KBBM)” initiative in Bajo de Masinloc. During the operation, Filipino vessels and fishermen encountered harassment from CCG and People's Liberation Army Navy vessels. Two of the Chinese ships collided with each other while chasing BRP Suluan, as Teresa Magbanua escorted the Filipino fishermen to safety. Following the collision, the Philippine Coast Guard issued a radio call offering assistance to the damaged Chinese vessels but received no response.

In October 2025, the Teresa Magbanua was deployed to Cebu with a medical team to assist earthquake victims.

On January 26, 2026, the vessel arrived in Manila carrying 15 survivors and the remains of 2 deceased crew members from the sunken MV Devon Bay. These had been turned over to the Teresa Magbanua by the China Coast Guard the previous day.

On October 1, 2026, the Teresa Magbanua, accompanied by a Philippine Coast Guard aircraft, was deployed off Batanes to challenge the Chinese research vessel JIA HAI KE 7, which the PCG said had been conducting unauthorized marine scientific research about 37 nautical miles northwest of Itbayat. During the operation, Teresa Magbanua approached to within about 100 yards (91 m) of the research vessel and deployed a rigid-hull inflatable boat while issuing radio challenges. A China Coast Guard vessel later arrived and issued its own radio challenges to the Philippine vessel. The PCG said the operation compelled JIA HAI KE 7 to leave its loitering position, while the Chinese Embassy in Manila said the research vessel was conducting normal operations in waters under Chinese jurisdiction and accused the Philippines of harassment.
