= Transparency initiative =

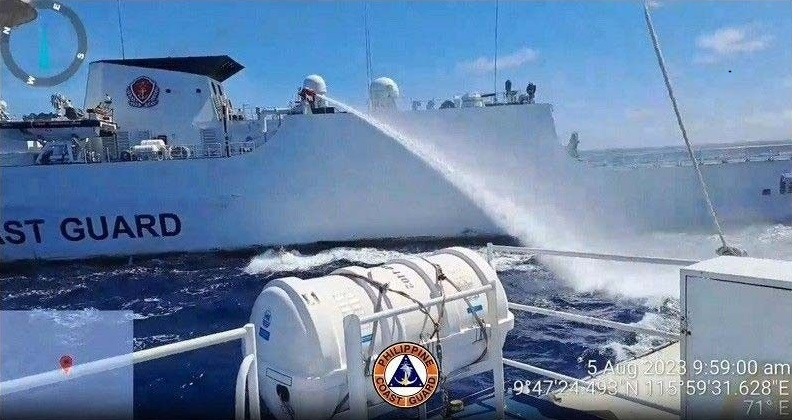
A Philippine Coast Guard photo showing a China Coast Guard ship firing water canon at the BRP Malabrigo in August 2023.

The transparency initiative, also known as assertive transparency, is a counter-gray zone strategy used by the Philippines to combat China's assertions concerning in the South China Sea dispute. It is marked by the Philippines publicizing of altercations involving China and Filipinos including fishermen and personnel of coast guard and the navy.

== History ==
The transparency initiative was adopted in February 2023 during the presidency of Bongbong Marcos. This was after a laser incident occurred at the Second Thomas Shoal when the China Coast Guard allegedly pointed a laser at the crew of a Philippine Coast Guard ship. China justified the move as its coast guard using laser as a measuring tool as part of routine law enforcement operations.

It preceded Rodrigo Duterte's foreign policy of silence and selective disclosure on dealing with China in regard to the South China Sea dispute. Duterte previously insisted that publicizing China's actions would provoke it to be more aggressive.

Since then, the Philippine government has shifted to publicizing altercations between China and the Philippines in the South China Sea.

== Strategy ==
The transparency initiative seeks to frame China as a "bully" of its smaller neighboring countries in the context of the South China Sea dispute. It serves as an awareness campaign for Filipinos on China's "illegal presence and dangerous maneuvers" in the contested sea which Manila insist deprives Filipino fishers of their livelihood and affront to its sovereign rights. It is also meant to garner support from the international community on the 2016 South China Sea Arbitration ruling which declared China's nine-dash line claim as invalid. It is seen as a response to China's grey-zone tactics in the South China Sea.

The Philippine government has published photos and evidence of Chinese alleged harassment of its fishers and its navy and coast guard personnel as part of the strategy. It has also invited journalists, both foreign and local, to join the Philippine Coast Guard's missions to the Scarborough Shoal and the Spratly Islands.

== Impact ==
National Security Council spokesperson Jonathan Malaya described the transparency initiative as having mixed results in 2024, stating it increased awareness both internationally and domestically in regard to China's actions but concedes it did not change China's behavior. At least for 2023, trade relations between China and the Philippines remain largely unaffected.

Benjamin Goirigolzarri of the Stanford Gordian Knot Center for National Security Innovation said that the initiative "damaged" China's global reputation and economic ambitions, while the Philippines has gained moral support from major Asian and European countries. In March 2025, the foreign ministers of the G7 countries issued a condemnation of China's "illicit, provocative, coercive and dangerous actions" and formally supported the results of the 2016 South China Sea Arbitration ruling that favored the Philippines.

University of the Philippines political scientists Edcel John Ibarra and Aries Arugay called the maritime transparency initiative a "necessary step forward" that has yielded strategic benefits such as garnering international solidarity and support and cultivating strong domestic public approval for the government's efforts to defend the country's national interest. However, they argue that merely exposing grey-zone tactics is insufficient, because of the personal and materials risks involve with the approach, and that challenges remain on the strategy's ability to weather domestic political disturbances.

The initiative has strengthened commitment of the United States with its military alliance with the Philippines, while a reciprocal access agreement (RAA) between the Philippines and Japan was signed by both countries' legislatures in 2025. The Philippines was also able to conduct joint-patrol exercises with foreign nations in the South China Sea as a result of the initiative.

== Reception ==
In 2025, Lithuanian defense minister Dovilė Šakalienė has praised the strategy which challenges "the illusion of China being peaceful and friendly".

== See also ==
- Foreign policy of the Philippines
- West Philippine Sea – name used by the Philippines to refer to parts of the South China Sea within its claimed exclusive economic zone.
- Cabbage tactics
- Chinese salami slicing strategy
