= Kingdom of Kumalarang =

Pre-hispanic Filipino nation

Kingdom of Kumalarang Kumalarang
- before 1417–1515
- Capital: Kumalarang
- Common languages: Subanon
- Religion: Hinduism, Islam
- Government: Kingdom
- King
  - 15th century-1421: Kanlai Ipentun
  - 1421-?: Lapi
- History
  - Established: before 1417
  - Subjugated by the Sultanate of Maguindanao: 1515
- Currency: Barter
Succeeded by
Sultanate of Maguindanao
- Today part of: Philippines

The old Kingdom of Kumalarang (Mandarin: 古麻剌朗; pinyin: Gǔmǎlàlǎng), also known as Sibuguey, was a Subanon kingdom located in the south of the Philippine Archipelago, more precisely in modern-day Kumalarang, Zamboanga del Sur in the island of Mindanao. According to Chinese records, Kumalarang already existed by the 15th century.

== History ==
=== Ming Chinese records ===
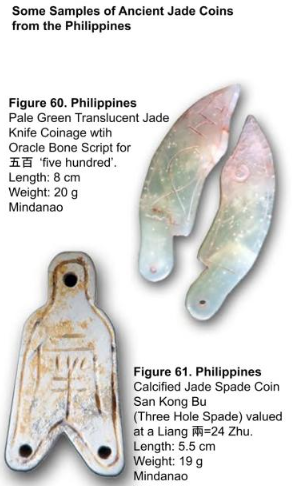
Varying Teal Colored Jade Coinages issued by the Chinese Empire that was found in Mindanao Philippines at vicinity of what was then the Kingdom of Kumalarang.

Kumalarang, along with other states in Insular Southeast Asia (like Brunei, Malacca and Sulu), were included in the Chinese records in the Ming Shilu as a state given with the imperial seal of the Emperor of Ming in the 15th century.

On 15 December 1417, the Emperor of China sent the eunuch Zhang Qian (張謙) to persuade the King of Kumalarang. Eventually, Zhang Qian arrived bringing the imperial decree to persuade the King of Kumalarang Kanlai Ipentun or Ganlayiyibendun (干剌義亦奔敦). He received various fabrics brought by Zhang Qian, including brocades, silk and gauzes.

In September 1420, King Kanlai Ipentun brought his family to accompany Zhang Qian to the Imperial Court of China, arriving on 16 November of the same year. The King was welcomed honorably and ceremoniously in a similar fashion to that of Sulu. Eventually, King Kanlai Ipentun brought a petition in front of the Emperor to become a tributary of China in which he was given several gifts coming from the Emperor that was deserving of a royal head of state. This was followed by gifts like luxurious clothing and a crown.

In the following year, February 1421, the King requested permission to return to his country. He and the Queen were gifted with luxurious clothing and fabric as well as gold and silver.

When King Kanlai Ipentun and others were able to reach Fujian, in an unfortunate turn of events, he became gravely ill and died on 27 May 1421. The Minister of Rituals ordered Yang Shan (楊善) to manage the burial ceremonies, in which he gave the late king a posthumous title of Kangjing 康靖 (courageous and peaceful). The local government organized his burial. The king's son Lapi or Labi (剌苾) succeeded to the throne and returned to Kumalarang bringing home the gifts and treasures coming from the Chinese.

On 3 November 1424, King Lapi ordered Datu Batikisan and others on a diplomatic mission bringing with them golds with a carved memorial.

=== Maguindanaon period ===
In 1515, after Sharif Kabungsuwan established the Sultanate of Maguindanao, Kumalarang was subjugated as its vassal state. However, they maintained a high degree of autonomy with the exception of establishing foreign relations in which only Maguindanao was allowed to do so on behalf of every other state. Islamization also began in Kumalarang, in which they eventually became a sultanate.

== Diplomatic relations ==
=== China ===
Relations were strong between Kumalarang and China as Kumalarang identified itself as a tributary of China similar to other states throughout Southeast Asia that intended to have economic ties to China.

=== Sulu ===
Before the King of Kumalarang travelled to China, the King of Sulu was able to gain favors from the Emperor. According to the historian William Henry Scott, Sulu was attempting to compete with Kumalarang in the flow of trade in the southern portion of the Philippine Archipelago. This is evidence of a highly active economic activity in Mindanao.

== See also ==
- Kumalarang
- Sultanate of Maguindanao
- Ming dynasty
- Yongle Emperor
- Ming Veritable Records
- Subanon people
