= Mitsui 56 series =

Class overview
- Builders: Mitsui Engineering & Shipbuilding
- Building: 170
- Completed: 151 (January 2013)

General characteristics
- Type: Bulk carrier
- Tonnage: 31,000 GT; 56,000 DWT
- Length: 190 m (623 ft)
- Beam: 32 m (105 ft)
- Installed power: MAN-B&W 6S50MC-C (9,070 kW)
- Propulsion: Single shaft; fixed-pitch propeller
- Speed: 14.5 knots (26.9 km/h; 16.7 mph)
- Capacity: Hold capacity 70,000 m^{3} (2,500,000 cu ft)

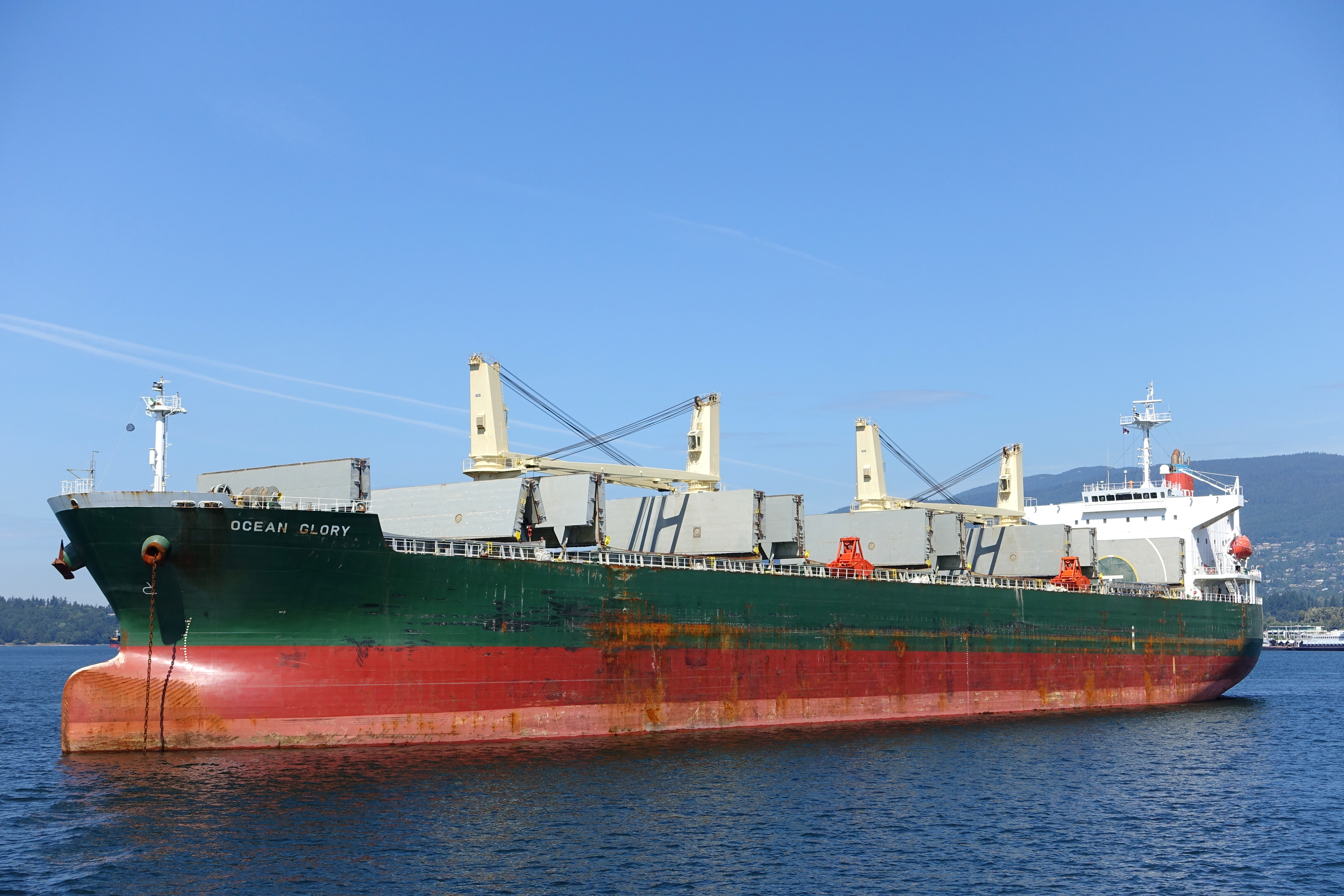
a cargo ship

The 56 series is a series of cargo ships built by Mitsui Engineering & Shipbuilding.

As of January 2013, 151 ships have been built and 170 ordered. The 151st was delivered to New Blossom Maritime S.A. They are built at Mitsui's Tamano and Chiba shipyards.

== Design ==
The ships are bulk carriers, 189.99m long overall (182m between perpendiculars) with 56,000 dwt and approximately 31000gt. Hold volume is over 70,000m³, divided between five cargo holds with four cranes. Main engines are generally MAN B&W 6S50MC-C low-speed diesels. Service speed is 14.5 knots.
