= West Philippine Sea =

Designation for parts of the South China Sea claimed by the Philippines

- Kanlurang Dagat ng Pilipinas (Filipino)
- An outdated map showing the approximate area corresponding to the official extent of the West Philippine Sea. Also included is the international treaty limits (red line as per the 1898 Treaty of Paris) and the Spratly Islands which is often designated as the Kalayaan Island Group in Philippine maps (green line as per Presidential Decree No. 1596 of 1978). The international treaty limits under the Treaty of Washington (1900), which retroactively included the outlying territories outside the Treaty of Paris of 1898 and is one of the many basis for the Philippine claim on Scarborough Shoal and the Spratly Islands, is not included in the outdated map.

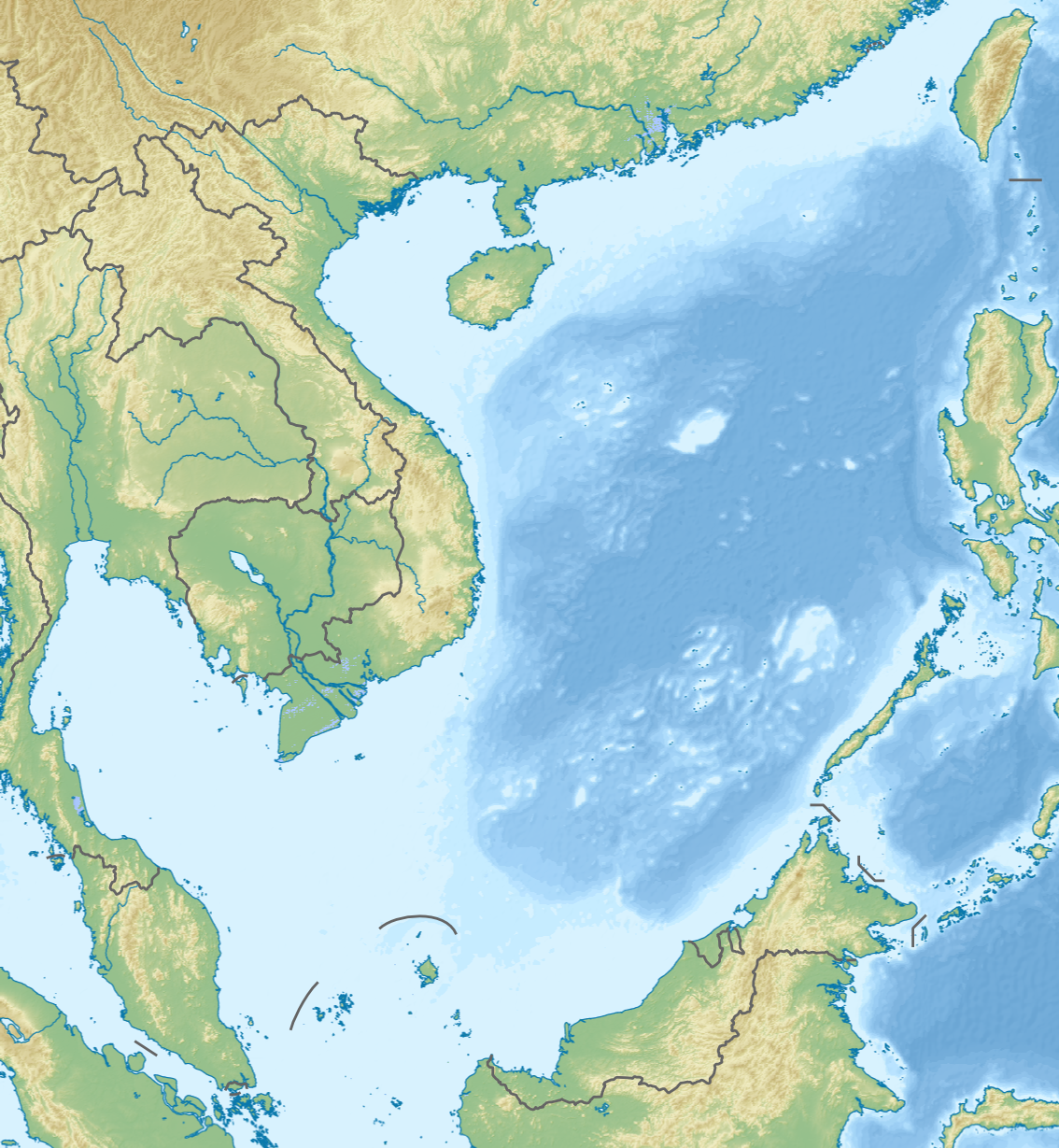
- Location within Luzon Location within South China Sea Location within Southeast Asia Location within Asia
- Coordinates: 13°N 118°E
- Etymology: After the Philippines (name officially adopted by the Philippine government on September 5, 2012 pursuant to Administrative Order No. 29.)
- Part of: South China Sea (Philippine-claimed EEZ only)
- Islands: Scarborough Shoal and Spratly Islands (disputed territories)

West Philippine Sea (Filipino: Kanlurang Dagat ng Pilipinas; or Karagatang Kanlurang Pilipinas; abbreviated as WPS) is the designation by the government of the Philippines to the parts of the South China Sea that are included in the country's exclusive economic zone. The term was originally used in the 1960s to refer to the body of water off the eastern coast of the Philippines. The name was later repurposed in the mid-2000s by the Philippines to refer to the body of water to its west surrounding the Spratly Islands and Scarborough Shoal due to territorial disputes with the People's Republic of China. The Philippine government officially mandated the use of West Philippine Sea in 2012.

== History ==
=== Background ===
The term "West Philippine Sea" has been in use by the international community since at least 1961, mentioned in geology and oceanography papers. It was, however, used to refer to the western portion of the Philippine Sea, which is East of the Philippine archipelago.

The International Hydrographic Organization (IHO), in its Limits of Oceans and Seas, 3rd edition (1953), does not list a West Philippine Sea. Instead, the area encompassed by the West Philippine Sea is considered a portion of the South China Sea. The 1986 draft of the IHO's Limits of Oceans and Seas proposed the Natuna Sea, which extends south from the Natuna and Anambas Islands to the Belitung Islands.

=== Modern use ===
The Armed Forces of the Philippines began using the name West Philippine Sea for the area around the disputed Spratly Island group since 2006. In 2011, the Philippine national government under the administration of President Benigno Aquino III started referring to the waters to the West of the Philippine archipelago as the West Philippine Sea. The officially stated purpose of the new name was related to the national mapping system, however according to other government sources, the move to rename the body of water was due to disagreements with China over territorial rights. According to Walden Bello, a member of the Philippine House of Representatives, the name "South China Sea" carries subliminal connotations of ownership by China, and renaming the area to West Philippine Sea dealt a psychological blow to China. It was meant to signify and reinforce the Philippine's territorial claims to the Spratly Islands and refute China's sovereignty claim over the entirety of a "South China Sea". The Philippine military gave similar reasons for their use of the name. Armed Forces spokesman Commodore Miguel Jose Rodriguez also mentioned the subliminal message that the name "South China Sea" sends and stated that each country has their own name for the area. Therefore the Philippines should call it the West Philippine Sea, which the military had done since at least the mid-2000s.

In the House of Representatives, Akbayan representative Walden Bello filed a resolution in June 2011 urging the government to look into the process of changing the name of the South China Sea to "Western Philippine Sea". According to Bello, the term West Philippine Sea did not carry any specific spatial demarcation or geographical specificity and was meant to reflect that the South China Sea was not China’s sea. The proposal to have a different naming for the sea has received support from the Armed Forces of the Philippines, which has been using West Philippine Sea since the mid-2000s.

That was codified by administrative order in September 2012, which mandated use of that term by departments, subdivisions, agencies and instrumentalities of the Philippine government. In September 2012, the Philippine government announced that it would start using the name to refer to waters west of the Philippines as "West Philippine Sea" in government maps, other forms of communication and documents. Application of the term has been clarified as limited to waters within the Exclusive economic zone of the Philippines.

=== 2016 PCA ruling ===
On July 12, 2016, the Permanent Court of Arbitration ruled in favor of the Philippines in a case not involving naming. It clarified that "The Tribunal has not been asked to, and does not purport to, delimit any maritime boundary between the Parties or involving any other State bordering on the South China Sea". The tribunal also ruled that China has "no historical rights" based on the "nine-dash line" map.

=== International Use ===
Multiple international governments, embassies, and representatives have used and acknowledged the term "West Philippine Sea". These include the United States with Ambassadors Sung Kim and MaryKay Carlson, the United Kingdom, France with Ambassador Marie Fontanel, Australia with foreign minister Penny Wong, and the European Union with ambassador Massimo Santoro.

== Legal scope ==
There is no exact demarcation of boundaries for the area in the South China Sea named by the Philippines as the West Philippine Sea. The Administrative order which officially named the area defined it as follows:

The maritime areas on the western side of the Philippine archipelago are hereby named as the West Philippine Sea. These areas include the Luzon Sea as well as the waters around within the adjacent to the Kalayaan Island Group and Bajo de Masinloc, also known as Scarborough Shoal.

— Sec. 1, Administrative Order No. 29 (2012)

In Philippine law, the West Philippine Sea refers only to the portions of the South China Sea which the Philippine government claims to be part of the country's exclusive economic zone (EEZ). The naming of the area became official through Administrative Order No. 29 issued by then-President Benigno Aquino III on September 5, 2012. The order also cites Presidential Decree No. 1599 which was issued in 1978 during the tenure of then President Ferdinand Marcos which established the Philippine EEZ as well as the Republic Act No. 9522 or the Baselines Law which was enacted into law in 2009 during the administration of then-President Gloria Macapagal Arroyo which delineated the baselines of the Philippine archipelago.

The administrative order asserts the Philippine claim over its EEZ in the South China Sea which conveys the Philippine government's position that it has sovereign rights under the 1982 United Nations Convention on the Law of the Sea over the West Philippine Sea area and "inherent power and right to designate its maritime areas with appropriate nomenclature for purposes of the national mapping system".

This legal scope was debated in a Senate hearing on February 3, 2026, discussing the Senate resolution concerning the diplomatic incident between Beijing and Manila in late January 2026. Senator Rodante Marcoleta cited the figure of 381,000 square kilometres (147,000 mi^{2}) given by the National Security Council, while Senator Kiko Pangilinan cited the figure of 500,000 square kilometres (190,000 mi^{2}) provided by the South China Sea Arbitration ruling in 2016. Both senators also debated on the exact coordinates of the sea with respect to the scope of the EEZ as given by the Philippine Maritime Zones Act, which provides for a 200-nautical-mile EEZ. Marcoleta claimed that four of the Philippine-administered features – Thitu Island, Northeast Cay, Loaita Island, and Lankiam Cay – lie outside the scope of the EEZ. Pangilinan stressed the validity of the arbitral ruling and expressed openness for amendment to relevant laws to clarify the matter. With regards to Marcoleta's concern over the International Hydrographic Organization's definition of Philippine and Chinese territories in the area, Senator Risa Hontiveros asserted that the international body's research "is technical, not a political organization and its map delineations do not constitute legal recognition of sovereignty such as China's 9-dash line". The next day, Commodore Jay Tarriela, Spokesperson of the Philippine Coast Guard for the West Philippine Sea, warned that anyone who begins to question the Philippine position on the West Philippine Sea "at some point" is already committing "treason" and can be considered "a traitor".

== Usage ==
Unofficial NAMRIA map showing features in the West Philippine Sea. Features names are those recognized by Philippine government.

Under the Administrative Order No. 29, the National Mapping and Resource Information Authority (NAMRIA) is mandated to use the designation West Philippine Sea in maps produced and published by the government agency. Other government agencies are also required to use the term to popularize the use of the name domestically and internationally.

Prior to the issuance of the order, the Philippines' weather bureau, PAGASA, adopted the name in 2011 to refer to waters west of the country while remained using "Philippine Sea" to refer waters east of the archipelago.

The term West Philippine Sea has sometimes been used to refer to the whole of the South China Sea, though this is usage has been denounced as incorrect.

The term "West Philippine Sea" has been searchable in Google Maps. In April 2025, Google updated its map to include a more explicit label for the West Philippine Sea. "South China Sea" remains visible northwest of the new label. The Philippine government and the Armed Forces of the Philippines praised the move, while the Ministry of Foreign Affairs of China objected to it. However the explicit label was temporary removed before it was later visible again.

== See also ==
- Exclusive economic zone of the Philippines
- North Natuna Sea
- Great Wall of Sand
- Nine-dash line
