= Jay Tarriela =

Spokesperson of the Philippine Coast Guard since 2023

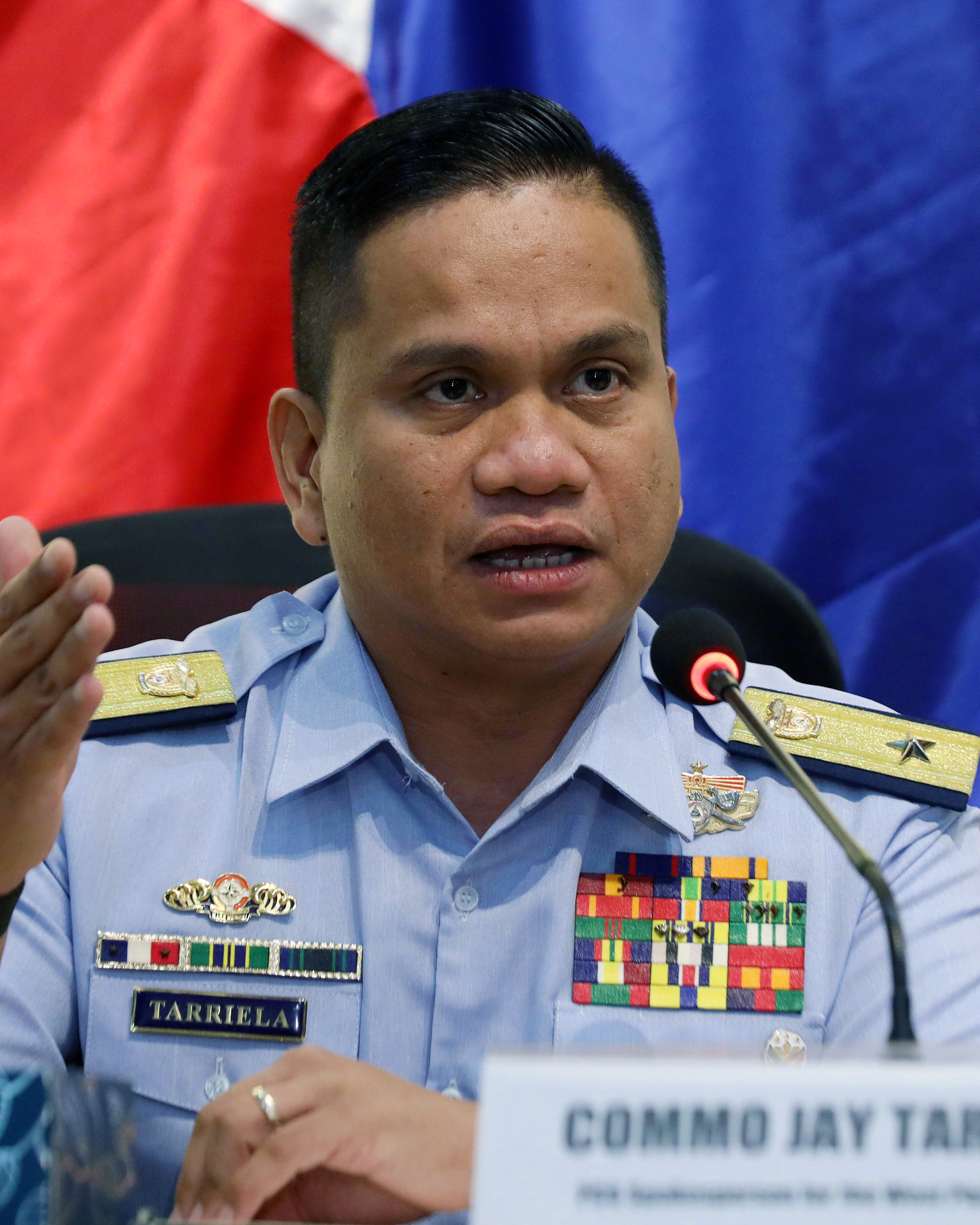
- Tarriela in 2025

Spokesperson of the Philippine Coast Guard for the West Philippine Sea
- Incumbent
- Assumed office 2023

Personal details
- Education: Jose Abad Santos High School
- Alma mater: Philippine Military Academy (BS); Philippine Merchant Marine Academy (MS); National Graduate Institute for Policy Studies (MPP, PhD)

Military service
- Branch/service: Philippine Coast Guard
- Rank: Rear admiral
- Unit: West Philippine Sea operations

Jay Tristan Tarriela is a Philippine Coast Guard (PCG) officer with the rank of rear admiral currently serving as the organization's spokesperson. He has contributed to maritime security and policy by publicly supporting the Philippines’ position in the territorial disputes in the South China Sea.

== Education ==
Tarriela was a student at the Philippine Military Academy (PMA). However, in September 2003, he along with seven other cadets were alleged to have cheated in a quiz. Management Information Science professor Jovelyn Hermano accused the eight of violating the honor code due to their answers being similar to another class. Tarriela admits leaving weeks prior to his supposed graduation in 2004 framing the move as a means to preserve the honor code. He and his seven others filed a legal complaint against the PMA for denying them due process.

Tarriela obtained a Master of Science in Maritime Education and Training from the Philippine Merchant Marine Academy Graduate School. He also earned a Master of Public Policy from the National Graduate Institute for Policy Studies (GRIPS) in Tokyo and the Japan Coast Guard Academy. In 2016, he was part of the first batch of the Maritime Safety and Security Program, launched jointly by both institutions.

Tarriela completed his Ph.D. in Advanced Policy Studies at the National Graduate Institute for Policy Studies in 2021.

== Career ==
Tarriela serves as the Philippine Coast Guard spokesperson for the West Philippine Sea. His role includes public relations, strategic communications, and engagement with international media regarding the Coast Guard's activities in the South China Sea. In February 2026, President Bongbong Marcos promoted Tarriela from the rank of commodore to rear admiral.

== Public policy positions ==
=== Maritime security advocacy ===
Tarriela has published articles on maritime security issues affecting the Philippines. In March 2020, he published an analysis proposing a strategic recalibration of the Philippine Navy in response to maritime tensions in the South China Sea, particularly addressing concerns over China's activities.

=== South China Sea dispute ===
Tarriela has publicly supported President Bongbong Marcos' administration and its stance on enforcing and defending the Philippines' claims in the disputed South China Sea. He has been a vocal critic of China's actions in the region by expressing his views through his Twitter (X) account.

He advocates for using the term West Philippine Sea. He has spoken out against Filipino influencers who, according to him, advance China's claims and narratives arguing that such content undermines the Philippines’ sovereign rights over the disputed waters.

==== Chinese diplomatic protest ====
In January 2026, the Chinese Embassy in the Philippines filed a diplomatic protest against Tarriela, accusing him of "attacking and smearing Chinese leaders" on social media in relation to the South China Sea dispute. The embassy characterized Tarriela's actions as a "blatant political provocation", citing his exchanges with a Chinese embassy official online and a Facebook post showing him delivering a speech in front of presentation slides captioned "Why China remains to be bully?", which had caricature-style images of Chinese president Xi Jinping. The embassy stated that the post violated China's "political dignity" and sought clarification from the Philippine government on whether Tarriela's remarks reflected official government policy. This diplomatic protest was supported by China's Foreign Ministry.

In response, Tarriela stated that the embassy's protest was an attempt to divert attention from what he described as China's aggressive and illegal activities in the West Philippine Sea. He argued that his remarks were based on documented incidents, including dangerous maneuvers, water cannon use, and harassment of Filipino fishermen, and cited the Vienna Convention on Diplomatic Relations in asserting that diplomatic missions should not interfere in the internal affairs of the host state. On January 22, 2026, China summoned Philippine ambassador Jaime FlorCruz to express displeasure over Tarriela's statements. Ever since the diplomatic protest, Tarriela had been in heated online exchange with the Chinese embassy, which further accused him of "lying".

=== Electoral advocacy ===
In October 2024, Tarriela discussed the significance of electoral decisions regarding maritime security. He encouraged voters to consider candidates commitment to defending Philippine territorial claims in the South China Sea.

== Selected publications ==
- "The Rise of the White Hulls in Southeast Asia: The Philippine Coast Guard Case" (Doctoral Dissertation, 2021).
- "Recalibrating the Philippine Navy's Strategic Direction" (2020).
