= Kiranmala =

Kiranmala may refer to:

- Kiranmala (folktale), a Bengali folk tale and one of the stories from Thakurmar Jhuli, a collection of Bengali folk stories compiled by Dakshinaranjan Mitra Majumder
  - Kiranmala (film), a 1979 Indian Bengali-language fantasy film based on the folk tale
  - Kiranmala (TV series), a 2014–2016 Indian Bengali-language fantasy television series aired on Star Jalsha
