= The Boy with the Moon on his Forehead =

Bengali fairy tale

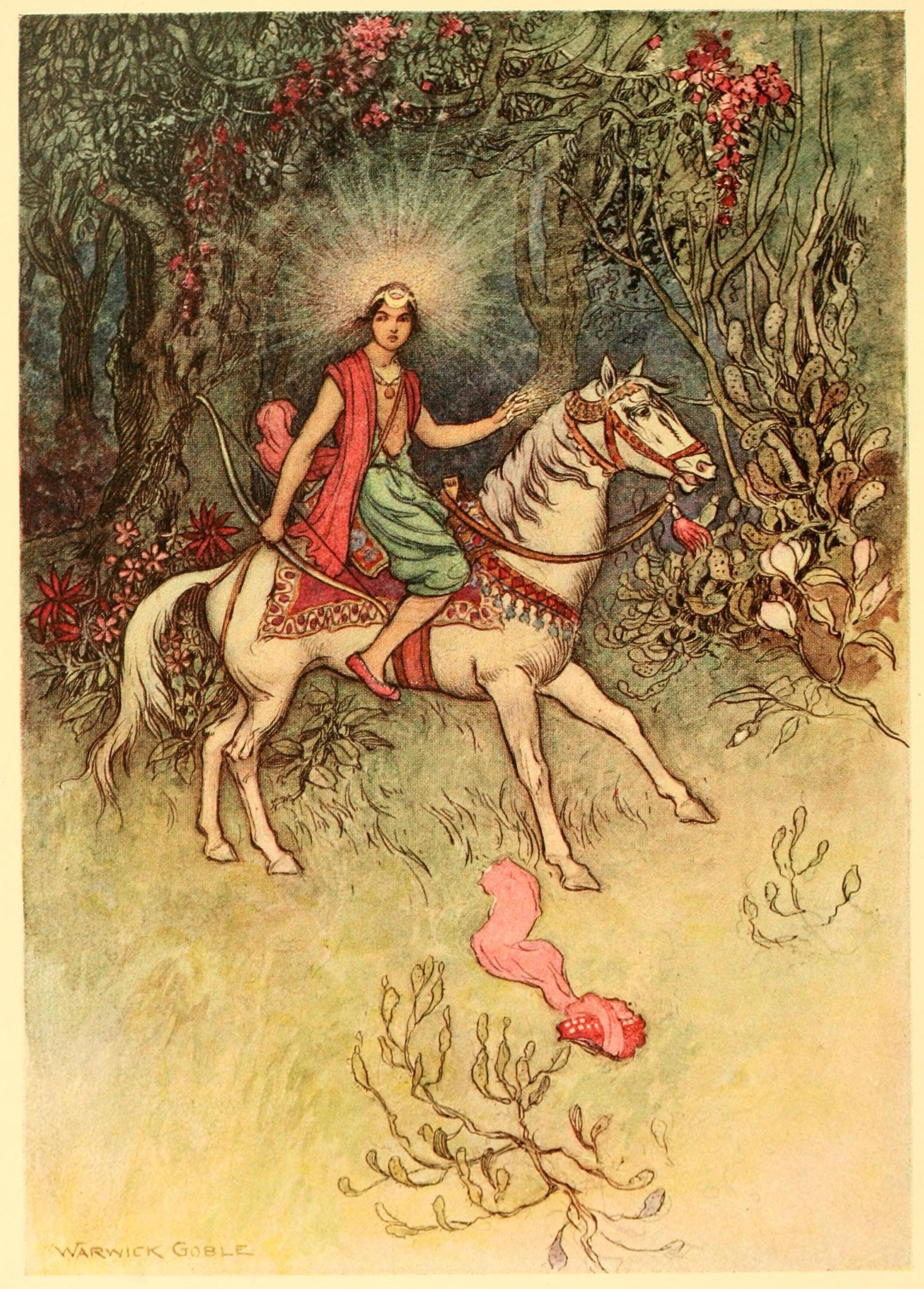
- The boy with the moon on his forehead. Illustration by Warwick Goble for Folk-Tales of Bengal by Lal Behari Dey (1912).

Folk tale
- Name: The Boy with the Moon on his Forehead
- Aarne–Thompson grouping: ATU 707 (The Three Golden Children; The Three Golden Sons)
- Region: Bengal; India
- Related: The Story of Lalpila; Saat Bhai Champa; Kiranmala; The Real Mother (Indian folktale); A Tale of a King

The Boy with a Moon on his Forehead is a Bengali folktale collected by Maive Stokes and Lal Behari Day.

These tales are classified in the Aarne-Thompson-Uther Index as tale type ATU 707, "The Three Golden Children". These tales refer to stories where a girl promises a king she will bear a child or children with wonderful attributes, but her jealous relatives or the king's wives plot against the babies and their mother. Many variants of the tale type are registered in India, although they comprise specific cycles in this country.

== Summary ==
=== Stokes's version ===
In Maive Stokes's version, later republished by folklorist Joseph Jacobs, titled The Boy who had a Moon on his Forehead and a Star on his Chin, a gardener's daughter says out loud, to her friends' mockery, that when she marries she will give birth to a boy with a moon on the forehead and a star on the chin. Her friends think she is only jesting, but her words draw the king's attention, who makes her his fifth cowife.

A year later, the king's other four queens convince the newly crowned one that the king may give her a kettle drum to inform the time of labour is approaching. The fifth queen sounds the kettle-drum three times to see if the king comes to her. He does on the first two occasions, but on the third he is absent, which creates a window of opportunity for the other queens to replace her son for a stone and deliver the baby to a nurse to kill him.

The nurse takes the boy in a box and buries it in the jungle, but the king's royal hound, named Shankar, goes to the hole and swallows the boy (but does not eat him). The dog takes the boy and rears him for a time. His master, the king's dogkeeper, sees the boy after the dog spits him out and marvels at the boy's beauty. The four queens learn that the boy is still alive and demand the dog to be killed come morning. The dog, however, saves the boy by giving him to the king's cow Suri, who swallows the boy in its belly.

The four queens once again learn of the boy's survival and order the cow to be sacrificed, but the boy is saved by the cow, who delivers him to the king's horse, Katar. The news of his survival reach the four queens' ears, who beg the king to sacrifice the horse. When a cadre of the king's sepoys surround the barn, the horse tells the prince to get some princely clothes, a bridle, a saddle, a sword and a gun from the stable, and ride it to escape execution.

The boy and Katar reach another country and exchange their clothes for common disguises, and the horse becomes a donkey. The prince with a moon takes up a job as a grain merchant's apprentice. On one hot day, the boy begins to sing to pass the time, and the local king's seventh daughter listens to the song. The princess goes to the royal garden, located neat the grain merchant's shop, and inquires the youth about his origins. He evades her questions. The princess insists on knowing about him, and this time he answers he is only a poor boy.

Some time later, the princess tells her father she wants to get married, and she must choose her husband. The king gathers a royal assemblage in the royal gardens, where the princess is to select her betrothed by placing a golden necklace around their neck, and she chooses the grain merchant's apprentice. The princes and rajás protest her choice, but the king accepts his new son-in-law

After their marriage, the princess feels a bit saddened that her intended does not join with her sisters' husbands in hunting game around the palace. The prince consults with the magic horse Katar (shaped like a donkey), and they transform back into a gallant prince and a horse. The duo hunt birds and deer, and stop to rest under a tree. The other six brothers-in-law come and see him in the guise of the prince with a moon and a star, and beg him for food and drink. The prince agrees, so long as the six other men suffer a red-hot iron scar on their backs.

The prince returns to the palace in his true form, to everyone's surprise. He tells the truth to his wife, who accepts him as her husband. Some time later, the prince tells Katar he wants to return to his own country to check on his father and mother. The youth and the princess visit his father's kingdom.

After the couple arrive and pitch their tents, the king pays him a visit. The youth introduces himself as a foreign prince, who wants to hold a grand banquet for the king and the whole kingdom is to be invited. Everyone comes to the celebration, except his mother, the gardener's daughter. The youth insists she is to be present too at the event. The youth greets her as a queen, to the other queens's anger.

Some days after, the prince asks the king if he has any sons. The prince reveals the whole truth to his father, and shows him the magic horse Katar, who has helped the prince so far. The king asks his son to live with him in the palace, but he will only consent if his father kills the other four queens. The king does, and restores his former queen to her proper place.

=== Dey's version ===
In another Bengali folk tale collected by Lal Behari Dey in his Folk-Tales of Bengal with the title The Boy with the Moon on his forehead, a king has not yet fathered a son, even though he has six cowives. So he decides to marry a seventh queen. In his wanderings, he finds a cow-dung seller's beautiful daughter. In a conversation with other girls (daughter of the king's minister, daughter of a wealthy merchant, and the daughter of the royal priest), she tells them that to whoever marries her, she will bear him a boy and a girl (the girl "divinely fair"; the boy with "the moon on his forehead and stars on the palms of his hands").

The king decides to marry the girl who promises the wonder children, to her mother's surprise and to the anger and jealousy of the other six queens. The king gives her a bell and tells her he will be travelling for the next six months. The other queens convince the girl to ring the bell to prove that the king will return to her side. After three times, the king grows impatient and will not returns after a fourth ringing.

The six queens take the seventh queen and a midwife to a hut in the stables, replace the twins for puppies and give them to be disposed by the midwife. She puts both babies in an earthenware pot and takes the vessel to a poor potter's wheel, so that he burns all vessels clays the next morning along with the infants. However, the potter and his wife wake up the next morning and discover the clay vessels have been prepared overnight. The couple also find the twins "of unearthly beauty" and raises them as their own children.

After the potter and his wife die, the twin children move to the king's city. When they enter a bazaar, the whole place illuminates all of a sudden. Fascinated by their beauty, the men at the bazaar promise to build a house for them, which they do. The boy hires a horse and hunts game in the nearby forests. One day, the king, also on a hunt, sees the mysterious boy. The youth shoots an arrow at a deer, but the force of the maneuver lets loose his turban, and the king can see his lunar birthmark.

The king returns to the six queens and tells them the incident, thinking about the son he might have had. The queens notice the youth is the boy they tried to kill in the past, and send the midwife to talk to both twins. The youth's sister is paid a visit by the midwife, who tells her her house need the kataki flower, guarded by 700 rakshasas.

The boy travels far across the ocean and finds a maiden named Pushpavati sleeping in a death-like state controlled by a golden and a silver baton. The maidens bids him to hide, as a rakshasa comes to wake up the girl. Pushpavati asks the demoness what may happen when she dies, and the creature answer that fate ordained that only the man with a moon on his forehead and stars on his palms can get a wooden box in a deep tank of water which contains the death of all rakshasas.

The boy follows the rakshasas' instructions, gets the wooden box, crushes the two bees that were inside and kills the demons. He takes a bunch of kataki flowers to his sister, along with the maiden. They return home safe and sound. One day, the youth invites the king to his house, where the whole truth is revealed by Lady Pushpavati. The king buries the six queens in the ground and reinstates the twins' mother to her rightful place.

== Analysis ==
=== Tale type ===
Both tales are classified in the international Aarne-Thompson-Uther Index as ATU 707, "The Three Golden Children".

Late 19-century and early 20th-century scholarship noted the great similarities between the Bengali tales and European fairy tales with a similar narrative. Scholar Francis Hindes Groome already saw a parallel between this tale with the Romani tale he collected, and Brothers Grimm's The Three Little Birds.

In their commentaries to the Grimm's fairy tales, folklorists Johannes Bolte and Jiří Polívka listed the Indian tales as related to the German tale The Three Little Birds.

According to Stith Thompson' and Jonas Balys's index of Indian tales, the tale type ATU 707 shows 44 variants across Indian sources. Stuart Blackburn also studied Tamilian variants of the tale type, which he claimed was "one of the most frequently told Tamil tales". As for Stokes's version, it is also classified as type AaTh 532, "The Helpful Horse", in Stith Thompson and Warren Roberts's Types of Indic Oral Tales. (Note: For clarification, German folklorist Hans-Jörg Uther, in his 2004 revision of the international tale type index (henceforth, ATU), subsumed type AaTh 532 under a new tale type, ATU 314, "Goldener", due to "its similar structure and content".)

=== Motifs ===
Folklorist Christine Goldberg, in the entry of the tale type in Enzyklopädie des Märchens, noted that in Indian variants of tale type 707, the children may entice their father to the truth by trying to feed a wooden horse. In others, the children die and are reborn as plants, and only their mother may pluck fruits or flowers from the trees. (Note: A similar sequence is attested in Iran, in a tale from Khorasan with the title Haft Derakht-e Sepidar ('Seven Poplar Trees'): after a girl is expelled from home and her brothers protect her, the brothers die and reincarnate as poplar trees, while their sister joins their transformation and becomes a blooming flower. Later, the king's gardener tries to pluck the flowers, but the girl asks her brothers if she should allow it. This sequence is reported by German scholar Ulrich Marzolph as its own tale type in the Persian Folktale Catalogue, indexed as type *407, "Die Familie in Blumen verwandelt" ("The Family changed into flowers").) (Note: Similarly, Tajik folklorist Klavdia Ulug-Zade collected a Tajik tale titled "Семь братьев и одна сестра" ("Seven Brothers and One Sister"), wherein seven brothers, at the end of the tale, turn into doves and fly away; his sister joins them in their avian transformation and they land in their parents' garden, where the brothers become seven poplar trees and the girl an apple tree that yields fruits; a prince tries to pluck an apple and is refused by the girl's brothers; an old man tries and the brothers agree to let him do it.) Likewise, researcher Noriko Mayeda and Indologist W. Norman Brown divided Indian variants of type 707 in five groups: (1) quest for wonderful items; (2) reincarnation into flowers; (3) use of wooden horses; (4) children sing a song; (5) miscellaneous.

Dutch author Christiaan Snouck Hurgronje noted that the motif of the hero branding his brothers-in-law (or other suitors) also occurs in Indonesian literature, namely, in Banta Ali or Banta Peureudan ("Prince Ape"), and in the Hikayat Indra Bangsawan.

== Variants ==
=== India ===
Folklorist Ashraf Siddiqui argued that variants of the tale type were "borrowed" into the oral corpus of the Santals, the Hos and the Birhors from the Hindus.

==== Quest for objects ====
In a Gujarati variant collected by Putlibai Wadia with the title Súrya and Chandra, a disguised raja wanders about his kingdom and reaches a tree near a well, where a group of young women were talking. Two of them boast about their skills, and a third, from a Brahman family, says she is destined to bear the Sun and the Moon. The king, interested in fathering both luminaries, marries the girl as his fourth wife. The woman bears twins: the Sun, a "divinely handsome boy", and the Moon, a "bewitchingly lovely girl". The other wives replace them for a log of wood and a broom and cast them in the sea. The queen is imprisoned and the twins are saved by a poor devotee, who named the boy Súrya and the girl Chandra. Years later, the girl is convinced to send her brothers for the sandalwood tree that lies at the bottom of the well of Chandan Pari, and the world-renowned Pari of Unchhatra, who petrifies people. Súrya brings home the sandalwood tree, and marries both Chandan Pari and Unchhatra. Unchhatra is the one to arrange for the truth of their parentage to be discovered.

In an Indian tale titled The Pomegranate Princess, collected from a Rajasthani teller named Chhoti, from Bassi, in the "Rajasthani dialect of Hindi", a childless king marries a seventh wife, a woman named Usha, to the jealousy of the other six queens. Now queen, Usha gives birth to a boy, a girl and another boy (as three consecutive births), but the jealous queens bribe the midwife to put rocks in their cribs and throw the children in the ocean. However, they are saved each time by a sadhu, who names them, respectively, Gokul, Kamala and Kalyan. Some time later, the sadhu dies, but leaves the children "the ashes of the fire", which are imbued with magic. The three decide to move from the sadhu's hut to the city, and Kamala, using the magic ashes, creates a fine mansion for them. The barber and the king's minister see Kamala and find a matchmaker. The matchmaker takes a job as the siblings' housekeeper and tells the girl the house will be even more beautiful if one of her brothers finds a pomegranate that "shines like a bright star in a far away tree". Her brother Gokul uses the ashes on his horse, rides it to the tree and takes the pomegranate home. That night, the fruit cracks open and a princess comes out of it. The next time, the matchmaker convinces the sister to send her brothers for the golden bird. As usual, the brothers fail and are turned into stone, but their sister gets the bird and rescues them. Now back home, the golden bird convinces the siblings to invite the king, the queens and everyone for a banquet. The bird reveals the intrigue to the king, who orders for the former queen to be brought to his presence.

Ethnologist Verrier Elwin collected a Baiga story from the Mandla district, titled The Brave Children: the fourth queen gives birth to a boy and a girl, but the three jealous co-wives of the king cast them in the water. They are found by a Sadhu, who gives them two sticks with a magical command. Years later, the jealous queens send the boy on a quest for a lotus flower and Pathari Kaniya (The Stone Maiden) as his wife.

James Hinton Knowles collected three variants from Kashmir, grouped under the title "The Wicked Queens". In the first, the number of siblings is 4 (three boys, one girl), the third son is the hero and he goes on a quest for a bird that speaks and sings. In another, there is only one son who quests for a tree and its covering (lacking the quest for a magical water and a magical bird, from other variants).

In a tale collected from the Lapcha people in Sikhim, The Golden Knife and the Silver Knife, King Lyang-bar-ung-bar-pono goes on a hunt with his two dogs. The dogs follow two stags. The animals turn into she-devils and kill the dogs. The king discovers their corpses and follow a trail into a second realm, Lung-da. He goes to the king's palace and meets two fairies: Se-lamen and Tung-lamen. Se-lamen spends a night with the king and promises to feed the entire palace with a grain of rice. Tung-lamen spends the next night with him and promises that she can clothe the king down to the poorest person with only one roll of cloth. The king Lyang-bar meets Ramit-pandi, the daughter of the king of Lung-da, who promises to give birth to a golden knife and a silver knife. They marry and Ramit-pandi gives birth to twins, who are replaced for puppies by the fairies. The evil fairies put the twins in an earthen pot and bury it deep in the ground at a crossroads. The twins' mother is killed, but her corpse floats upstream. The boys are found by a poor old couple. Years later, king Lyang-bar summons the twins to his presence to inquire them about their origins, and the evil fairies convince the king to send them after the golden and silver flutes of the demon Chenchhyo-byung-pono. The twins steal the flute and a pair of tusks and make peace with the demon, returning soon after to their father's kingdom to reveal the whole truth and to resuscitate their mother.

==== Birth of multiple children ====
Author Mary Frere collected an Indian tale titled Truth's Triumph. In this tale, told across two generations of the same family, a childless Rajah with twelve co-wives sees a bringal tree with no leaves but with 101 bringal fruits. His Wuzeer interprets the sight as a portent: whoever marries the daughter of the Malee who tends the garden, shall father 100 sons and a daughter. The rajah marries the Malee's daughter, Guzra Bai. The girl's humble origins spark the jealousy of the twelve co-wives, who take the 101 children and abandon them in the wilderness. In the wilderness, the single sister lives in the forest and witnesses her brothers' transformation into crows, but she is eventually found and marries a Rajah of a neighboring region. Her child, the prince, learns of his family history and ventures on a quest to reverse his uncles' transformation. At the climax of the story, the boy invites his grandfather and his co-wives and reveals the whole plot, as the family reunites. The tale was later republished as The Triumph of Truth by illustrator Katherine Pyle, and in German as Der Sieg der Wahrheit.

In a tale collected from the Muria people in Kanhargaon, Bastar State, by Verrier Elwin with the title The Nine Scores and One Babies, a Raja with seven wives hasn't fathered a son. One day, a beggar and his wife appear at the palace to beg for alms. The Raja dismisses the man, but lets the beggar woman stay. After some months, the woman is pregnant with child, and the Raja gives her a flute of sorrow and a flute of joy, to blow if she ever need his presence. The beggar woman blows on both flutes to test it, but the Raja becomes annoyed and promises not to get back to her. The other queens seize the opportunity to blindfold the beggar woman while she delivers her children: nine scores of boys and a girl. The queens replace them for a grindstone and cast them with the buffaloes, which suckle the children. The seven queens go to the buffalo shed and notice that the children still live, so they get the children and throw them in the bottom of a well in a Marar's garden. The Marar couple finds the children and adopt them. Years later, when the children grow up, the seven queens look for them to give them a cursed piece of bread, which turns them into monkeys. The boys' sister goes with them to live in the jungle. One day, a hunter finds the girl in the jungle and wants to marry her. The girl refuses, but the hunter promises to turn the brothers back into humans. The hunter fulfills his promise and marries the girl, while her brothers, now back into humans, decide to seek employment elsewhere. They steal for a living, which attracts the attention of the Raja, their father. They are arrested and confront the Raja with the truth of their story. The Raja orders the beggar woman to be brought to them, and for a screen to be put between the beggar woman and the boys. Jets of stream flow from her breasts to the boys' mouths, confirming their parentage.

Scholar P. Goswami summarized a tale from Assam with the translated title The tale of the hundred sons and the golden-nosed daughter. In this tale, a king has two wives and no children, until a sage appears and gives them a fruit. The elder co-wife eats the pulp, leaving only the seeds and peeling and becomes pregnant. When she is ready to give birth, the elder co-wife covers the younger's eyes with a blindfold, takes the children (a hundred boys and a girl) as soon as they are born and thrown in the river, and replaces them with wooden dolls. The 101 siblings are rescued by an old couple, who raises them. Years later, after some adventures, they return home and the king punishes his elder co-wife.

Professor Stuart Blackburn collected a tale from a Tamil informant named Sitalakshmi, with the title The Sixteen Wooden Blocks. In this tale, a raja marries twice in order to sire an heir, to no avail. On a ride, he finds a group of five or six girls, among them an Irula tribal girl with a large stomach. It is explained that the girl can give birth to sixteen children, which greatly interests the raja. The monarch goes to talk to her parents, pays them a bag of gold as bride price and takes the Irula girl as his third wife. In time, she becomes pregnant, and the king gives his co-wives a bell to ring when the babies are born, for he will leave on a ride. After he departs, the co-wives commission sixteen wooden blocks from a carpenter. The babies are born to the Irula girl: the elder a daughter and the other fifteen sons, whom the co-wives throw in a garbage heap and replaced for the wooden blocks. They ring the bell to summon the king and lie that the Irula girl gave birth to wooden images, which makes the king to demote her to the cow-pen. As for the children, they survive and are raised by the "Queen of the Rubbish Heap". The co-wives see the children and ask the raja to remove the garbage heap. The woman from the garbage heap takes the babies to Ganga Devi, who raises them by the well. The co-wives find the children again and ask the raja to plug up the well. Ganga Devi delivers the children to Kali Devi, who raises them in her temple, and still the co-wives find them when they bring flour to the temple, so they ask the raja to destroy the temple. The children move out to the forest, when a tiger appears to devour them, but Siva and Parvati turn the siblings into stones to spare them from the tiger's attack, then restores them to human form. Later, the elder sister orders her young brothers to go to an old woman's house and ask for food. The brothers go to ask her for food, but give a wrong answer and the old woman turns them into plants. As for the elder sister, she cries for their delay and her tears form a stream that flows into a river. Another king goes to investigate, discovers the girl and marries her. In time, she gives birth to a son, but remains silent all the time. Her son complains to her that his schoolmates tease and mock him for his mute mother and threatens to kill himself if she does not speak. The girl begins to talk and explains her brothers have been turned into plants by the old woman. The son goes to talk to the old woman and begs her to restore his uncles, which she does with water and a magic wand. The fifteen siblings are reunited with their elder sister. The elder sister then requests them to commission fifteen wooden blocks, take them to their father's, the raja, assembly and beat the blocks, asking aloud if a woman could bear fifteen wooden blocks, for the raja will invite them for a meal; during the meal, they are to take care, for the co-wives will try to poison them. It happens as the elder sister describes, and the fifteen siblings give the poisoned meal to crows and dogs. The elder sister asks them to repeat the stratagem and they are invited again to the raja's palace, but they ask that the meal should be prepared by the cowherd woman, who is their mother. The raja tries to invite the siblings' sister, but the elder sister wants the raja to bring the fifty-six rajas of the world for a gathering. It happens thus, and the elder sister attends the assembly, where she recounts her family's life story: how the raja met the Irula girl with a big stomach, how the co-wives replaced the children for wooden blocks and tried to destroy them, how the raja was tricked and humiliated the Irula girl, how the siblings were separated by the old woman and the elder sister was found by a king who married her, and how the family reunited at last.

Professor Sujatha Vijayaraghavan translated a Tamil tale with the title The Foolish King, originally collected around Cuddalore district. In this tale, a king has three wives and no children. One day, he goes on a ride and finds some Irula children playing. One Irula kicks another girl's belly, who tells her to take her, since her belly can bear sixteen children. Interested, the king goes to meet the poor Irula girl's family, a poor couple named Irula and Irulatchi. The king asks for the Irula girl's hand and takes her as his fourth wife. After she becomes pregnant, the Irula queen is given a bell to ring. Meanwhile, the three co-queens ask a carpenter to fashion sixteen wooden seats, and place the objects next to the Irula queen, then take her sixteen children (a girl and fifteen boys) and cast them in the rubbish heap. The king comes back and finds the wooden seats instead of children, and demotes the Irula wife to sweep the palace. As for the children, one of the co-wives finds the children playing by the rubbish heap, so she feigns illness and asks for the king to destroy it. The Goddess of the Rubbish takes the children and places them in the well to spare them. Next, the co-wives keep finding the children in new hideouts and ask the king to destroy it: first, a well, but Ganga Devi takes the siblings to Kalika Devi's temple; then, Kaliva Devi takes the children and leaves them in the forest. However, a tiger appears to eat the boys and the girl, when Paramasivan and Parvathi turn them to stones, then restore them after the tiger goes away. The sister, the eldest of the group, sends them towards an old woman's house and advises them to answer they are in search of livelihood. They go to the old woman's house, answer incorrectly, and are turned to plants. The girl notices her brothers's delay and cries in the forest. A king and a minister find her, and the king marries her. The girl gives birth to a boy. The young prince is mocked for his mother's muteness, and confronts her about it. The girl tells her son about how she sent her brothers to old woman's hut and they never returned. The prince makes the same path and meets the old woman, explaining about their uncles' disappearance. The old woman asks the prince to delouse her, and the plants return to human form. The fifteen brothers, now young men, and the prince return home and the sixteen siblings are reunited. The elder sister gets fifteen wooden seats, which she gives to her brothers so that they dive in the pond in the eighbouring king's realm, splash about and cause a ruckus by shouting if a woman could bear fifteen wooden seats; the king, who is their father, will invite them for a feast, but they should decline it at first. It happens thus, and the brothers manage to draw the king's attention. They repeat the stratagem the following day, but their elder sister warns them they are to take care, for the co-wives will try to poison them. It happens as the elder sister describes, and the fifteen siblings give the poisoned rice to crows and dogs. The elder sister asks them to repeat the stratagem a third time, but to ask that the three queens are locked up; the Irulatchi woman to prepare them rice, and that the king invites all the kings of the world (who amount to fifty-six). It happens this, and the Irulatchi woman cooks rice for the fifteen young men and their sister. During the assembly, the sister recounts her family's life story: how the king met the Irula girl, how the co-wives replaced the children for wooden seats and tried to destroy them by asking the monarch to dig up the pit, and other details. On hearing this, the fifty-six kings burn the three co-queens in a lime kiln, while the king reinstates the Irula girl as his wife and reunites with his children. Vijayaraghavan noted that the story existed in "several versions" in Tamil Nadu, and that it was also "prevalent" in other states.

Zacharias P. Thundy published a tale from a Kadar informant that he titled Bhadrakali, the Mother Goddess. In this tale, a mighty and powerful king lives in the east, has many wives, and still no children. He makes pilgrimages, send gifts to priests and asks hermit for intercession, to no avail. One day, he rides in the forest with his retinue and meets a girl under a pipul tree. The girl threatens to turn them to stone if they come near. The king approaches her and she asks for an arecanut and some betel leaves, which the king gives her. She keeps asking the king, who moves in to hit her, but she says it would be a sacrilege to hit her, a goddess, his future wife and mother of seventeen children, sixteen boys and a girl. The king takes her as his newest wife and moves her to her own palace, to the jealousy of the other co-queens. Ten months later, the goddess is pregnant, and the other co-wives place a blindfold on her eyes. She gives birth to her predicted sixteen boys and one girl, whom the midwives toss with the rats and place mortar, pestle, rocks, and driftwood to trick her and the king. The king falls for the co-queens' ruse and orders his soldiers to return her to the forest and starve her to death. Meanwhile, the rats find the children and, seeing the "divine halo" around the siblings, deliver them to the temple of goddess Bhadrakali, where they animals are told to bring them to the neighbouring country. An old ayah finds and raises the children, who grow up. One day, the brothers leave their house to find pearls to their sister, and, when they return home, they are caught in a strange storm and hit by lightning. The sister comes out of the house and finds the brothers and their horses dead. The girl cries for her fallen brothers, when a prince finds her and takes her and her brothers with him. The prince marries the girl and buries her brothers and their horses in his palace. The girl gives birth to a son. The little prince is mocked for being "uncle-less" (having no uncles), and asks his mother about it. The girl tells her son about the dead uncles, and the little prince vows to revive them. He goes to Bhadrakali's temple and is welcomed by a matron, who is a goddess and gives him a wand and some water to restore his uncles to life. The goddess also reveals the little prince that his uncles are the sons of the king of the country. The little prince returns home, enters the room where the bones are interred, waves the wand and sprinkles the water on the bodies and his uncles return to life with their horses. The little prince tells them he is their nephew, their father is the king, and goddess Bhadrakali was the one to revive them. The sixteen brothers talk to the king about their blood relation, but he needs some proof, so the siblings go to the forest where their mother is trapped, and jets of breastmilk flow from her breasts towards them, proving their relationship. The little prince appears, says that she is Bhadrakali, the Mother Goddess, who blesses them and vanishes.

==== Other tales ====
Indian scholar A. K. Ramanujan demonstrated the existence of two markedly different modes of storytelling regarding a South Indian variant of the tale type. One way of narration (which he called "domestic") skips the preamble and is more basic and to the point; the second mode ("bardic") is accompanied by instruments and offers a more elaborate tale: the story about king Chadurangaraja who, despite being married to five queens, never had a son, so he goes on a journey in search of a new queen, and finds a maiden named Kadasiddamma in a temple.

In a variant from Salsette Island, Bapkhadî, the Salsette Cinderella, in the second part of the tale, after Bapkhadî marries the prince, she announces that a miraculous event shall happen when she gives birth: if to a boy, "a shower of gold" [golden water] shall appear; if to a girl, "a shower of silver" [silver water]. Everytime she gives birth (to two boys and a girl), the events happen and the king, on a trip, returns home to see his newborn children, but the queen's sisters have taken the children and replace them with animals. The princess Bapkhadi is taken to the dungeon. The siblings are rescued by "the hand of the Almighty God" and grow up. They survive by begging and chanting their story, introducing themselves as Brothers Saya from under the saya tree, Brother Ansa from under the ansa tree and Sister Denku from the Church. One day, the prince - their father - and their aunts pass by them and their aunts give their alms, but the children refuse. The prince is puzzled at the children's behaviour, and they explain that, after they take Bapkhadi out of the dungeon and prepare seven thick curtains, the truth will be revealed. The prince follows with the instructions: behind the heavy curtains, jets of milk stream from Bapkhadi's breasts and into the children's mouth, thus proving their biological connection.

Elwin collected a tale from the Pando people, in the Korba Zamindari, with the title The Raja of Kakarpur: the raja of Kakarpur is already married to six wives, but has yet to father a son. One day, he goes near a tank of water where the princess of Mahuapurgarh and six companion arrive to bathe. The seven girls play in the water and comment with one another what is prophesied for each of them: the princess, the seventh to speak, tells the others her fate is to be the seventh wife to a man and bear him "a son who would shine as brightly as the rays of the sun". He takes the princess by force to his kingdom and marries her. When the fabled boy is born to her, with skin shining as the light, the six other queens become very angry and refuse to talk to their husband unless he banishes the seventh queen from the palace with her son. The boy and his mother are banished to the jungle; the boy eventually separates from his mother and is reared by a sow, a she-dog and a mare. The six queens notice the boy is alive and, to torture him, feign illness and lie to the king that they need the liver of the sow and the she-dog. The mare escapes with the boy to the city of Bhuiharra, where he finds work as a potter's apprentice. During the Ekti festival, the princess and her twenty handmaidens try to buy some red coloured pots from the boy, now a youth, but he says they are not ready. So he paints the 21 pots with a red paint made with red earth and his urine. The 21 girls drink water from the pot and become pregnant and give birth to a son each. The princess's father organizes a paternity test wherein the sons are to identify their father from all men in the realm. The children indicate the potter as their father, and he tells his life story to the king of Bhuiharra.

In a tale collected from the Santal people, Raj ar eae go̯ṭẹn rạni reaṅ ("A King and his Seven Wives"), a king marries seven wives, wanting to have a child, but no such luck. Then, "Father Isor of Heaven", under the guise of a "Gosse", instructs him to go to his own mango grove and find a tree with seven mangoes and give them to his wives, with the promise that the king give him, the Gosse, his firstborn. The first six wives eat their mangoes and the fruit reserved to the youngest wife. However, she gets the mango rind and eats, becoming pregnant before the other wives. The king arranges the preparations for the birth of his child: the queen shall ring a deep-sounding bell for a boy, and a tiny-sounding bell for a girl. The queen gives birth to twins, a boy and a girl (both bells were sounded), but the other jealous co-wives, out of envy, replace the children for two worn-out brooms. The twins are found and raised by a potter and his wife. The truth is revealed when the Gosse goes to the palace to cash in his promise and tells the king none of the children of the other six queens are his firstborn. The tale later continues with the adventures of the seven half-brothers.

In a Gujarati tale published by author Tara Bose with the title The Story of the Twins, king Vijaypal of Gujarat has six wives, but no child yet. His ministers recommend he marries a poor, but beautiful woman named Suman as his seventh wife. Suman becomes pregnant and gives birth to twins, a boy and a girl, who are taken by the other six queens and replaced for pups. The twins are cast in a wooden box in the Shetrunji River and are saved by a hermit. The hermit names the boy Dilaram and the girl Chandrika and raises them as his children. On his deathbed, the hermit gives the twins a magical pot and two rubies. After their adoptive father dies, they rub the rubies against each other and two fairies appear. They wish for the fairies to take them to the land of their birth, Paran. Once there, they build a palace for themselves and Dilaram invites the king and every citizen in the realm for a feast. After the feast, the king takes an interest in the twins' past and orders his ministers to ask around. The ministers find a former midwife named Champa, who looked after queen Suman until the twins' delivery. The king learns the truth, embraces Dilaram as his heir and reinstates Suman as his queen.

In a Tamil tale from Madurai district, a raja is despondent for not having a son, so he remarries four times. His newest wife is pregnant, and he goes away on a hunt. She gives birth to seven children, the eldest a girl, but the other cowives replace them with insects and cockroaches, and abandoned in a garbage heap. The children are raised by a rat, who tells them to find some food in the palace. The cowives see them and order the rat to be killed. The rat takes the children to the temple of Kali and resigns to her death. The goddess Kali raises the children, until the cowives order Kali to be killed and her blood used to cure her headaches. Kali delivers the children to a snake foster mother named Nagamma. Later, Nagamma takes the children to a Gasnesa temple and they are raised there until they are ten years old. At the climax of the tale, the eldest sister decides to return home and confront her father and the cowives. She summons a panchayat and presents her case as a story in front of the assembly of people.

In a tale from the Kota people collected by linguist Murray Emeneau with the title How children were reared by bandicoots and a cow, an old man named Angarain lives in Kolmel with his elder wife. Wanting to have a child, he prays to his gods, to no avail. One day, he goes to the village of Porgar and meets a young woman there, who he marries and takes to his house in Kolmel to be his co-wife, working in tandem with the elder one. The elder wife pretends to accept the man's decision, and secretly plots to get rid of her rival. After a while, the second wife becomes pregnant and is taken to a hut in the backyard (the story explains it is an old custom for pregnant women to be taken to another hut to give birth and blindfolded). The elder wife blindfolds the second wife so she cannot see her child. A son is born to her, but the elder wife takes the child and buries him in the bandicoot's barrow (badger, in Zograf's translation) near a garbage heap, while placing an old broom to trick their husband. The badger's mate, in its barrow, has just given birth to their brood, and the male badger brings the human boy to live with them. This repeats with Angarain's second son (who is replaced by a wooden mallet) and third son (who is replaced by a hair roller with cat's hair). The three boys are raised by the animal family in the badger's hole. Six years later, the elder wife goes outside and sees the three boys rushing to hide inside the badger's barrow, and realizes they are the second wife's children, who are still alive. She goes home and pretends to be ill, and asks Angarain for some fresh badger blood to smear on her forehead. The man goes to sharpen his axe, and badger overhears some villagers talking about it, then goes to warn his mate about it. The animals decide to take the children to the forest of Teloinar, where Angarain grazes his cow. After they meet the cow, the badgers deliver the children to be reared and fed by the cow, and depart. Back to Angarain, he goes to the badger's barrow and does not find anything, save for some human children's footsteps, and returns home empty-handed. Later, the elder wife goes to the forest and sees the cow nursing their children, then returns home to repeat the ploy of feigning illness, this time asking for the sew made of cow's brain. Angarain decides to fulfill her request, but, suspecting something, kills a pig and gives its meat to his wife, who eats it with relish. Some time later, her has a dream: an old man tells him he was deceived, and urges him to bathe and go to the forest, where he will find his children. Angarain follows the vision's instructions and finds three boys in the forest, who he recognizes as his sons and takes home. The elder wife is punished by the village elders by hanging, and they decide that, from now on, whenever a woman is ready to give birth, people are to go to her house. Russian translator Georgy A. Zograf translated the tale to Russian with the title "Дети в барсучьей норе" ("Children in the Badger's Hole").

British officer John Shakespear collected an untitled etiological tale from the Lushei people about the origin of the Tui-chong river. In this tale, Tui-chongi and her younger sister Nuengi walk through the forest on a hot day, and the elder, to provide water for her sister, transforms herself into a river (the Tui-chong river, tributary of the Kurnaphuli) to sate the latter's thirst. The stream, however, flows to the country of the Bengalis with a mighty force it draws the attention of the Bengali king, who sends people to find its origin. The forerunners trace its upstream origin and finds Nuengi, who they bring to their king. The monarch of Chittagong marries Nuengi, and makes her the youngest queen of his harem. In time, she gives birth to a son, who the elder co-queen replaces with a puppy and throws in the river. The Tui-chong river, who was still Tui-chongi, rescues the boy and raises him in the river. Nuengi gives birth to six other sons who share their elder brother's fate and are thrown in the river. Years later, their aunt, Tui-chongi, reveals her nephews their origins and bids them go and dance on the roof of their father's palace. It happens thus: annoyed at the disturbance, the king goes to check on its source, and sees the seven boys. The seven boys explain to the king they are his sons; the king reinstates Nuengi and punishes the elder co-queen. Anthropologist B. Lalthangliana published a version of the story titled Origin of the Tuaichawng River. The tale was also reprinted as Origin of the Tui-Chong stream, and sourced from the Lushai people. Scholar Heda Jason listed this etiological tale as a Tripuran variant of tale type 707.

In a Hill Korwa tale translated as The King and His Abandoned Twin (sic), collected from informant Mrs. Sudhni Bai, in Kado Pani, in 2014, a king has two wives, one elder and one younger, and still childless, and suffers for it. One day, he declares that he will search for a mango for the queens to eat and become pregnant. The king brings back a mango and gives it only to the elder queen. The younger queen returns from her bath and asks about the fruit, since their co-husband promised to share it with the three of them. She realizes they ate the mango, but finds the stem, scrapes it and eats it. In time, she gives birth to twins, a boy and a girl. The king is surprised that the elder, who ate the mango's pulp, did not bear children, while the younger ate the mere stem and gave birth to twins. The elder queen fears that the king will favour the younger and tries to kill the babies: she places them in a goat pen for the goats to trample them, but they survive; next, she places them on a road where cows and buffaloes tread for the cattle to tread on the children, but they survive. A vulture flies by, sights the children and snatches them to its nest to raise them. After the children grow up, the vulture parent tells them they are of age and need to live on their own. The female twin questions where they will leave, and the male twin says they cannot return to land, since people will hurt them, so they gather feathers, fashion wings and fly around. The twins' mother notices them flying overhead and sings a song about them, saying they look like a parasol, spinning like flowers. The king realizes the flying pair are his children and wonders how he can bring them down to the ground. The younger queen brings them down and bathes them, then tells the king to fetch water from seven wells to bathe the twins, and to have them sat on the board of a chair with seven parasols. It happens thus, and the king fulfills their requests and brings them back home with him.

=== Nepal ===
Russian orientalist Lyudmila A. Aganina published a Nepalese tale translated to Russian as "Сказка о мальчике, у которого на правом плече - солнце, а на левом - луна" ("Tale of a Boy with the Sun on his right shoulder and the Moon on his left"). In this tale, a king named Subahu lives in his kingdom. The gods have given him wealth and glory, but he lacks an heir, so he devotes himself to pilgrimages and prayers, even marrying six women in succession, to no avail yet. One night, he goes with his minister to spy on two beautiful women taking a midnight bath in the sea. After the women get out of the sea, first some servants, then two women who comment to each other about their wishes for a son. The elder girl, who is the elder sister, says she will give birth to a boy fearless ("formidable") as death god Mahakala, and the youngest that she will bear a boy with the Sun and the moon on his shoulders. The king learns of this and takes the younger sister as his newest wife, for he has six co-wives from previous marriages. Before the seventh wife gives birth to her promised wonder son, the six co-queens bribe the court astrologers to predict the newborn will be a monster and bring disaster to the kingdom. It happens thus. When it time for the youngest queen's labour, she gives birth to her fabled son, but the co-queens bribe the midwife to replace the baby for a piece of wood and throw him in a pond to drown. The king falls for the deception and banishes the seventh co-queen to the barnyard to herd the cattle. As for the boy, a giant fish swallows him and protects him in its belly. One night, when the fish goes to eat and the boy is on the shore, the queens see the baby's birthmarks shining in the distance and realize he is alive, so they feign illness and ask for the fish to cure their ailment. The fish learns of its imminent death and gives the boy to the king's winged steed for protection: the horse swallows the boy and only eats at night, after every animal has fed. This situation draws the king's attention, who tries to feed it himself but the horse denies him. The co-queens, who were alerted of the steed's strange behaviour, accompany the king with the executioner to the stables, but the steed opens its wings and flees to another kingdom, where it raises the prince in seclusion. It also warns the boy to hide his astral birthmarks with a cape. Years later, when the boy is a youth, the local rajah summons his three daughters to ask them about their marriage wishes: the elder to a king, the middle to a king's son, and the youngest to the destitute boy that rides the winged horse around their kingdom. The rajah reiterates the question to the youngest princess, and she insists on marrying the poor boy. Thus, their marriages are celebrated: the elder two to noble men and the youngest to the poor youth, who then moves out to a humble hut. Later, war erupts and the rajah's enemies are at the gate. The rajah convenes with his generals, and the third princess offers to send her husband to the frontlines. Her suggestion is carried out: the boy with the sun and moon on his shoulders, riding on the winged steed, finishes off the enemy armies. News of his prowess reach the first king's ears, who ponders that the youth looks like the boy his wife promised to bear, so he goes to the rajah's kingdom. After the king arrives, the rajah asks his son-in-law why he never talked about his parents, and the youth answers that his horse was his only companion. The king goes to embrace the boy with the sun and moon on his shoulders, realizing he is his son, and promises to take him back to their kingdom. But first - the youth requests -, the king has to right the wrongs the co-queens have wrought against them. Thus, the co-queens become servants to the youngest queen, who is restored to her proper place. The tale was also translated to German as Von dem Jungen, der Sonne und Mond auf der Schultern trug ("About the boy that carries the Sun and the moon on his shoulders"), and as Vom Jungen mit Sonne und Mond auf den Schultern ("About the youth with Sun and Moon on the shoulders"). The story is classified as a "contamination" of type 707, The Three Golden Children, with type 314, Goldener, possibly due to the fact that, in some variants of the former, the children have a Moon or a Star or golden hair.

=== Pakistan ===
==== Sindhi ====
In a Sindhi tale published by Sindhologist Nabi Bakhsh Baloch with the title Noor Shah Badshah (Sindhi: "نورشاھ بادشاھ"), a king laments the fact he has no heir, when a beggar appears, gives him a thread and directs him to a fruit tree in his garden whose fruits can cure the queen's barrenness. The queen eats some of the fruits and gives birth to a son they name Noor Shah Badshah. The prince grows up and is educated by mentors and teachers. He also enjoys hunting. During a hunt, Prince Noor Shah reaches the house of three women talking about their marriage wishes: the first declares she can feed her husband's household with a quarter weight of flour, the second boasts she can sew clothes for the whole household with a seer of thread, and the third promises she can bear a beautiful son with the Sun on his face and the Moon on his back, and wherever he enters, he will illuminate the place. Noor Shah marries all three women.

After the wedding, prince Noor Shah is taciturn and his co-wives talk to him: he wishes to see them prove their claims. Thus, the first prepares bread with a meagre quantity of flour for the whole palace, the second sews clothes for the whole palace with few strands of cloth, and the third becomes pregnant. The promised child is born, but the other co-wives hide him in the stables and place a sack of coals near his mother. Noor Shah falls for their deception and reduces the third co-queen to a mere servant. As for the child, he illuminates the whole stable, to the women's horror, who decide to throw him in the forest to be trampled by passing men and animals. It happens thus, but from his grave, a banyan tree sprouts and provides shade for the king. The co-queens then want the tree to be cut down; a flower survives and is eaten by a goat, which gives birth to a special lamb. Noor Shah likes the kid and gives it to a goatherd for protection, but the co-queens try to bribe the goatherd to have the animal.

The goatherd flees to another kingdom and raises the kid with other goats. One day, the goat begins to talk and says he wishes to marry the local princess. The local king sets suitors' tasks first (to have a well full of flowers, and to have a well full of coins), which are duly fulfilled, and he has to deliver his daughter to the goat. The princess marries the goat and, one night, discovers the goat removes his goatskin at night to become a handsome prince. The now human goat prince lives with the princess. One day, he decides to journey to his father's, Noor Shah Badshah, kingdom joined by his wife. Noor Shah, now a king himself, welcomes the foreign prince with a feast, but the prince notices a woman wearing rags. Noor Shah indicates that woman in rags promised a son, but gave birth to coals. The prince reveals he is the woman's promised son and embraces his father. Noor Shah then banishes the co-wives and remains with his son and his son's mother.

==== Odki language ====
In a tale collected by linguist George Abraham Grierson from an Odki source in Muzaffargarh, a king is childless, and goes outside his kingdom to meet a group of faqirs near a fire. The faqirs ask him the matter, and the king answers: he has no son. The faqirs then advise the king to take two tapāsās, to be eaten to his wife and himself, and she will bear a son with the moon on his forehead and a star on his little finger. The king follows the faqirs' instructions and thus a son is born to his eldest wife. The king's second wife conspires with the midwife to kill the child: the midwife replaces the boy for a bag of coals and leaves the child in a heap of manure. The king's she-dog finds the boy and takes care of him. Two years later, the second queen learns the boy is still alive and orders his death, but the she-dog gives the boy to a "bloody horse" for safekeeping. The boy grows up and is discovered by the king, who takes him back to the palace.

== Adaptations ==
The folktale was adapted into a graphic novel by Indian publisher Amar Chitra Katha, in 1979, with the name Chandralalat, the Prince with a moon on his forehead.

Cat Stevens tells this story sparely in his song "Boy With a Moon & Star on his Head," from his 1972 album Catch Bull at Four.

== See also ==
- Fire Boy (folktale)
- The Magician's Horse
- Thakurmar Jhuli, collection of Bengali folktales
- The Turtle Prince (folktale)
