= A Tale of a King =

Folktale from Tulu Nadu

Folk tale
- Name: A Tale of a King
- Also known as: Arasu Kate
- Aarne–Thompson grouping: ATU 707 (The Three Golden Children; The Three Golden Sons)
- Region: Tulu Nadu, India
- Related: The Story of Lalpila; Saat Bhai Champa; Kiranmala; The Real Mother (Indian folktale); The Boy with the Moon on his Forehead

A Tale of a King (Tulu: Arasu Kate) is an Indian folktale collected from the Tulu Nadu region, in southwestern India. The tale is classified in the Aarne-Thompson-Uther Index as tale type ATU 707, "The Three Golden Children". These tales refer to stories where a girl promises a king she will bear a child or children with wonderful attributes, but her jealous relatives or the king's wives plot against the babies and their mother. Many variants of the tale type are registered in India, although they comprise specific cycles in this country.

== Sources ==
The tale was originally published as Arasu Kate in 2011, in a compilation of Tulu folktales.

== Summary ==
In this tale, in the kingdom of Candrapaṭna, a king named Cākru-Cōkru has two wives (Vajra and Ratna), two courtesans by his side (Enakebūta and Kanakebūta), two horses (Ākrōji and Pakrōji), two elephants (Adānu and Madānu), two dogs (Kāḷu and Boḷḷu), and there are two ponds near his palace, called Kukkaḍi and Kullaḍi. Despite his wealth, the king has no son, nor his pet animals any litter, and the ponds are all dried up, and he laments the situation. He travels afar and a deity approaches him in human form, asking the cause of his woes. The king confides in the stranger and the god produces three magic stones for the monarch to use: one he is to throw into the dried pond to have it fill with water, where he is to wash his hand and feet; then, he is to walk a while through the paddy field and throw the second stone to create a mango tree, and finally to throw the last stone to knock down a mango. The mango is to be given to his two queens, and they shall bear children.

The king does as the god instructed and plucks the mango to give to his wives. Queen Ratna is occupied with her ritual bath, and queen Vajra is told of the fruit's child-bearing properties by the king. Vajra eats the whole fruit and tosses the stone away. Ratna leaves the bath and some maidservants inform her of the king's gift, so she asks them to find the stone, which was in the ground outside. Only Ratna becomes pregnant, and the pre-natal wish-fulfillment is held at the palace. (Note: The collectors explain that this ceremony, called bayake in Tulu, deals with a woman's pregnancy by fulfilling her desires during pregnancy, including gastronomic.) The king leaves for war, but gives Ratna instructions to ring a large bronze drum with pebbles. One day, she feels ill and beats the drum, and the king returns to see her.

After nine months, Ratna is ready to give birth and queen Vajra falsely offers her help in the delivery. Ratna gives birth to twins, a boy with a golden crown and a girl with a golden ornament parting her hair. Queen Vajra takes the children and buries them under a cowdung heap in the cattleshed, and replaces them for a lizard and a skink to trick the king. The monarch receives a letter with the false information. Meanwhile, queen Vajra goes to milk her pet tawny cow and notices it is yielding only half of its normal measure (eight). She spies on the cow and discovers it is nursing the children, so she takes the twins away and tosses them inside a well in a pot. However, a family of eagles is also feeding the children in the well, so the queen decides to cast the children in water in a pot.

A boatman rescues the children from the pot and adopts them. He meets an old woman and takes her in to live with them so she can nurse the children. The pair raise the twins, but eventually die and leave the siblings alone. The children drop out of school and live in the boatman's humble shed. One day, years later, while the female twin is cooking, she welcomes an old woman tenant from the king's palace and tells her their whole story. The old tenant goes back to the palace and comments her visit with queen Vajra. The queen realizes the children are alive and sends the tenant back to the twin's hut to say they are so beautiful, they need a golden palace, which they can find beyond seven seas.

The male twin goes in search of the golden palace and finds it at the confluence of the seven seas, inhabited but demons. The demons tell the boy they can give the palace in exchange for lifting the demons' large cooking rice pot. The boy utters a command for it to shrink, if he was born in Truth and raised in Virtue, and fulfills the request, gaining the palace in return. Next, the tenant women, per queen Vajra's orders, tells the pair to seek a wife for the brother, a maiden called Siṅgi, sister to Nārāyaṇa, the Lord of the Heavens. The boy decides to have Singi as his bride and goes after her. He reaches a large bākimārū field dotted with stones - other people that fell victim to Singi's powers. The boy steps on the field and begins to turn to stone, then calls for her, and her guardian informs her of the stranger seeking her. Singi comes out with a goblet of water and restores the boy.

The boy tells Singi he wishes to marry her, and she says he must ask for her brother's permission up in Heaven, so she conjures up a string ladder and bids him climb it, without thinking either of his sister or of her. The boy begins to climb and up there, begins to worry about his sister, causing the ladder to cut off and him to fall to earth and die. Singi revives him and repeats the warning, but he thinks of Singi while climbing the second time and falls to his death again. Singi revives him a second time, and he obeys her warnings this time, reaching Narayana in Heaven. The boy prostrates before the deity and explains the motive for his visit, and Narayana agrees to let Singi marry the human boy if she consents to it. The god also allows the boy to take gold, jewels and other wealth before going down. The boy climbs down the ladder, spends some time with Singi, then returns with her to the golden palace.

Preparations for the boy and Singi's wedding are arranged and invitations are sent to monarchs and rulers, but the people worry that the boy has no parents to give away the daughter and welcome the daughter-in-law. At the wedding ceremony, the bridegroom knows that his parents are there among the crowd of monarchs, but cannot tell which, so a test is prepared: the boy's mother would have her breasts brimming with milk. However, none of the queens present cannot produce milk, so they question king Cākru-Cōkru, who was invited to the ceremony, if he had any other wife somewhere. They send for the disgraced queen Ratna, demoted to work in the garden, cook horse-gram and eat a little morsel of rice. She is given new clothes and attend the wedding. Once there, a lady presses her breasts: a jet of breastmilk leaves her right breast to enter the boy's mouth and another from the left breast to the girl's, proving their relation. The male twin marries Singi, and king Cākru-Cōkru takes them home. The boy hacks up queen Vajra as her punishment, and lives with Singi, his sister and his mother.

== Analysis ==
=== Tale type ===
The tale is classified in the international Aarne-Thompson-Uther Index as type ATU 707, "The Three Golden Children": three sisters converse among themselves about their plans to marry the king, the youngest promising to bear children with wondrous aspect; the king decides to marry the youngest (or all three), and the youngest bears the wondrous children, who are taken from her and cast in the water by the jealous aunts; years later, the children, after many adventures, reunite the family, which leads to the aunts being punished.

According to Stith Thompson' and Jonas Balys's index of Indian tales, the tale type ATU 707 shows 44 variants across Indian sources. Researcher Noriko Mayeda and Indologist W. Norman Brown divided Indian variants of type 707 in five groups: (1) quest for wonderful items; (2) reincarnation into flowers; (3) use of wooden horses; (4) children sing a song; (5) miscellaneous.

=== Motifs ===
According to Stith Thompson and Jonas Balys study of motifs of Indian literature and oral folklore, the tale contains the motif T511, "Conception from eating"; T511.1, "Conception from eating fruit", and specific motif T511.1.3, "Conception from eating mango".

A motif that appears in the Indian variants is that, in the conclusion of the tale, jets of breastmilk flow from the children's biological mother, the disgraced queen, confirming their blood relation.

== Variants ==
=== Brother and Sister ===
In an Indian tale collected in Tulu Nadu and translated as ಅಣ್ಣ-ತಂ ("Brother and Sister"), a king in a village has married twice and still has no son. A god in human form tosses three stones on the ground and a mango tree sprouts, whose fruits the king is to pluck and give to his co-wives and they shall bear sons. The second wife eats the whole fruit and tosses aside the pit, which the first wife eats and becomes pregnant. The first wife gives birth to twins, a boy and a girl, while the king is away, and the second wive tries to kill the twins by hiding them in the cowdung pit, then replaces then for frogs and toads to trick the king. The king banishes his first wife and hires a water carrier to water the garden. The water-carrier finds the children and nurses them on cow's milk. The king wants one day to clean out the manure from the barn and the second wife, afraid of her ruse being discovered, throws the children away, but they are found by a religious man. The priest raises the children and gifts them a magic carper that can carry them wherever, a magic pot that can feed any number of people and a magic stick that can create a golden palace. The twins use the carpet and fly over to the king's village, then build a golden palace for them. The king's second wife learns of the twins' survival and asks her grandmother to get rid of them. The grandmother meets the female twin and tells her her brother can find her Jatayu, beyond seven seas. The male twin goes on a quest for Jatayu, kills a snake to protect two cubs, and convinces Jatayu to come with him. Next, the grandmother tells the female twin to send her brother for a maiden named Patala Singhi ("ಪಾತಾಳ ಸಿಂಗಿ", in the original). The brother plants a basil plant as token of life to alert his sister if something happens to him, and travels on the flying carpet beyond seven seas. The male twin finds Patala Singhi's palace and calls out for her, becoming petrified after three calls. The female twin learns her sibling has perished and goes there to rescue him. She cries over her brother's statue, and Patala Singhi, hearing the commotion, leaves her palace and revives the twin, then goes with the siblings back to their home. Sometime later, the king holds a feast, and the twins bring Jatayu and Patala Singhi as guests. The second wife tries to poison them, but the quarter refuse to wash their hands or to eat the food, which they give to some dogs to prove it is poisoned: they eat it and die. The four ask the king to bring the disgraced first queen, who has been demoted to water the garden. The king sends for her. The first queen arrives and the king presses her right breast; a jet of her breastmilk gushes forth and enters the male twin's mouth. Then, her left breast is squeezed, and out comes a jet of breastmilk to enter the female twin's mouth, proving their bloodties. The king then punishes the second wife and retakes the first wife and children. According to the collector, the tale was collected in 1973 from an illiterate elderly female Tulu informant named Akkamma, from Konaje, in Mangalore, which she learned from an elderly source named Gauri Madiwalagitti. The tale was also classified as tale type 707, "The Three Golden Sons".

=== Twin Children ===
In another tale collected in Tulu Nadu and translated as ಅವಳಿ ಮಕ್ಕಳು ("Twin Children"), a king has three wives, and still no son. One day, however, his third wife, Sumitra, announces she is pregnant, while the king is away at war. The elder queens feign friendship and helpfulness, then take the children, a boy and a girl, as soon as they are born and throw them in the river, then place puppies in their place. The king is told the third wife gave birth to animals and he banishes her to water the flowers in the garden. As for the children, a farmer (Marakalan) finds the twins and raises them. After he dies, the twins go to his father's village and find work as lowly labourers near the palace. The co-wives learn of their survival and plan to get rid of them: they send a maidservant to tell the female twin to send her brother for a bride from Rakkasanur, beyond seven seas. The male twin lights up a lamp that serves as his token of life, saying that if the light goes out, it means something happened to him. The male twin finds a winged horse on the shore and flies to the demon realm. A demoness falls in love with him and gives him a magic cane, and he reaches the golden palace where the princess lives. He calls for her three times and becomes petrified in the third time. The princess revives him with magical water and joins the male twin on the horse back to his home village. The male twin creates a golden palace with the cane. The princess has omniscient powers, and knows the truth of the twins' royal origins. Failing to kill them, the co-wives invite them for a feast and the palace and try to give them poisoned food, but the princess warns him about it. During the meal, the male twin throws the food to a dog, which eats it and die. He then enters the garden and meets his mother, who reveals the whole truth. The king learns of the co-wives' plot, executes them and retakes the third queen and the twins as his children. According to the collector, the tales "Twin Children" and "Brother and Sister" belong to the "same category".

=== The Magic Mango ===
In a South Indian tale from Tulu Nadu with the title "ಮಂತ್ರದ ಮಾವು" ("The Magic Mango"), a king has two queens, the elder Venkataputhali and the younger Nagaputhali. The monarch has no sons, so god Narayana, under a disguise of a human Brahmin, gives the king a bowl of water and a stick, with instructions to douse the stick in the water, go to a certain place and beat a mango tree for the fruits to fall down, pluck a mango and give to his co-queens. It happens thus, but the elder co-queen eats the whole fruit, while the younger one eats its pit. Only Nataputhali becomes pregnant, to the elder's jealousy. Some time later, the king announces he will depart to take care of some business, and gives a bronze pillar to Nagaputhali. Convinced by Venkataputhali, Nagaputhali rings the pillar a few times, annoying their co-husband, who tells her he will not come to her after she rings it a third time, leaving her unprotected. Thus, Venkataputhali blindfolds her rival and helps in the delivery of the children: twins, a boy and a girl. Venkataputhali orders a servant to throw the children by the dung heap and place two puppies in their place. The king returns from his journey and, fooled by the deceit, reduces the younger queen to water the garden. As for the children, they survive near the dung heap, for a cow nurses them on its milk. Venkataputhali notices this and orders the twins to be placed next to the wild birds to be devoured, but the birds feed the twins and their own young with seeds. Failing that, she casts them in the water in a box. The box is washed away to another margin where an old man lives. He sees the box and rescues the twins, raising them as his own children. When they are older, the old man gives him three magic stones as a dying gift. The twins move out to another land, then the male twin uses the three stones to create a palace for him and his sister, grains and servants with the second one, and a horse, weapons and ornaments with the third one. The male twin goes to hunt in the king's lands, and an old maidservant of Venkataputhali informs the queen about the children's survival. The queen then pays her a sum for her to get rid of the twins: she pretends to be a beggar and pays a visit to twins' palace. She compliments their "copper" palace, and convinces her to search for silver roof for the palace, which lies beyond seven seas, guarded by seven demons. The male twin rides a silver horse and gets the silver covering for their palace. Next, the maidservant sends the twins for gold plates, which lie beyond sixteen seas in the hands of sixteen demons. The male twin makes the same journey and makes the demons cast a spell to cover his palace in gold. The third time, the maidservant tells the female twin her brother should have a bride, and there is one suitable for him. The male twin journeys to Mirloka and finds a maiden called Mardur Mard Singhi, who agrees to be his wife after some talk with her father. The male twin celebrates his marriage to Singhi by inviting everyone to his palace, where he retells the story of his and his sister's birth. On hearing it, the king embraces his children, reinstates Nagaputhali, and orders the execution of the elder co-queen.

== See also ==
- The Boy with the Moon on his Forehead
- The Story of Lalpila
- Saat Bhai Champa
- Kiranmala
- The Real Mother (Indian folktale)
