= Kiranmala (folktale) =

Bengali fairy tale

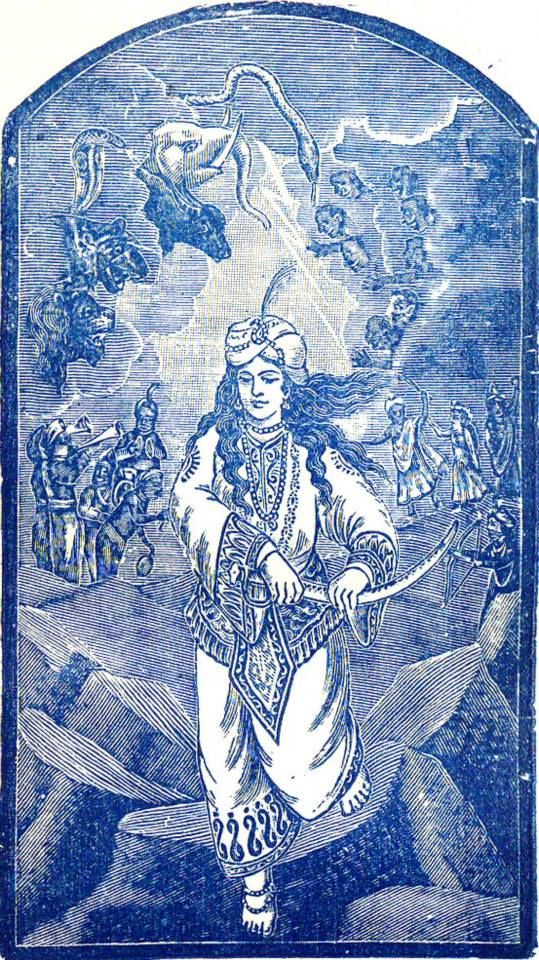
- Kiranmala braves the mountain of perils. Illustration by Dakshinaranjan Mitra Majumdar.

Folk tale
- Name: Kiranmala
- Aarne–Thompson grouping: ATU 707 (The Three Golden Children; The Three Golden Sons)
- Region: Bengal, Indian Subcontinent
- Related: The Story of Lalpila; Saat Bhai Champa; The Boy with the Moon on his Forehead; The Real Mother; A Tale of a King

Kiranmala (Bengali: কিরণমালা) is a Bengali folktale collected by author Dakshinaranjan Mitra Majumder and published in the compilation Thakurmar Jhuli (Bengali: ঠাকুরমার ঝুলি; Grandmother's Bag [of tales]), a collection of Bengali folk tales and fairy tales.

The tale is classified in the Aarne-Thompson-Uther Index as tale type ATU 707, "The Three Golden Children", a cycle of stories a woman promises a king she will bear a child or children with wonderful attributes, but her jealous relatives or the king's wives plot against the babies and their mother. Many variants of the tale type are registered in the Indian Subcontinent, although they comprise specific cycles in this country. In one of the cycles, the king's children are sent on dangerous quests to find marvellous items.

== Translations ==
The tale has been published as Kirunmala, or the Wreath of Light, by author Francis Bradley Bradley-Birt; as The Story of Kiranmala by Geeta Majumdar; as Kiranmala by Sayantani DasGupta, and as Arun, Barun, and Kiranmala. Folklorist Sohinder Singh Wanjara Bedi republished the tale with the title The Golden Sparrow.

== Summary ==
The king wanders the streets at night to listen to his subjects' opinion of him, and stops by a house where three sisters are talking to one another: the first wanting to marry the feeder of the king's horses, the second to the royal cook, and the third to the king himself. The king brings them all to his presence the next day and marries the youngest.

Time passes, and the young queen is ready to give birth, but asks to be nursed by her elder sisters, instead of stranger. Unbeknownst to her, her sisters have begun to nurture envy at their cadette's fortunate marriage, and seize the opportunity to bring harm to her. The first time, the queen gives birth to a young boy, whom the elder sister replaced with a cur and throw him in the river in an earthen pot. The second time, the queen gives birth to another boy, who is replaced by a kitten, and in the following year, a girl is born, but a doll is put in her place. Thinking his wife is an evil woman, the king banishes her from the palace to sit astride a donkey.

As for the children, the two siblings share the fate of their elder, and are abandoned in the river in an earthen pot. However, each time a Brahmin, who was making his devotions near the river, finds each pot and rescues them, then raises them as their own. The Brahmin names the boys Arun and Barun (Varun) and the girl Kirunmala. After he dies, the siblings meet the king after a heavy storm on the road, and decide to build a palace. One day, a fakir passes by their palace, compliments their fine abode, but suggests the girl to send her brothers for "a silver tree with flowers of gold, a tree of diamonds with birds of gold perched on it; and a canopy of a net made of pearls" (In Wanjara Bedi's printed version, a "golden sparrow, a tree of silver and a spring of jewels"). In this tale, the water is only used to disenchant Kirunmala's petrified brothers, and one of the birds of gold convinces them to invite the king to a banquet.

== Analysis ==
=== Tale type ===
The tale is classified in the international Aarne-Thompson-Uther Index as ATU 707, "The Three Golden Children".

According to Stith Thompson' and Jonas Balys's index of Indian tales, the tale type ATU 707 shows 44 variants across Indian sources. In addition, researcher Noriko Mayeda and Indologist W. Norman Brown divided Indian variants of type 707 in five groups: (1) quest for wonderful items; (2) reincarnation into flowers; (3) use of wooden horses; (4) children sing a song; (5) miscellaneous.

Professor Ashutosh Bhattacharjya described that Kiranmala has a "distant similarity" to the Bengali tale Saat Bhai Champa.

=== Motifs ===
According to Giuseppe Flora, Kiran means 'ray, beam (of light)'. As for her brothers' names, Arun derives from Aruṇa, a Hindu deity associated with the sunrise and whose name means 'the reddish one'. Also, in the original, the silver tree is called rūpār gācha, the diamond tree is hīrār gācha, and the bird of gold is sonār pākhī.

== Variants ==
=== India ===
Indian author M. N. Venkataswami published an Indian tale titled The Two Princes and Their Sister: a poor woman has three daughters. One day, a fairy, under the guise of an old woman, is welcomed by the youngest and kind third sister into their house. The fairy blesses their house and leaves. One night, the three sister talk to one another: the eldest promises she can weave a great sail for a vessel, if she maries a captain; the middle one promises to give birth to a boy if she marries a king; and the youngest promises to give birth to twins, a boy with a golden chain on his neck and a girl with two stars on the front if she marries a prince. Coincidentally, a ship's captain, a king and a prince just happen to pass by the house at the exact moment and overhear their conversation. The men take each of the sisters as their respective wives. Jealous of the luck of the younger ones, the eldest sister deceives her brothers-in-law by replacing the king's son for a block and the prince's children for animals, and casting the babies in the water. The babies are saved by a country merchant and looked after by the fairy that visited their biological mothers years ago. When they are grown up, their aunt, the ship's captain's wife, sends them after the dancing-water, the singing apple and the singing bird that sings songs from "all climes and nationalities". According to Venkataswami's preface, the tale was provided by a Tamil herbalist named R. J. Samuel, who heard it from a Tamil pandit in the early 1870s.

In an Indian tale collected by John W. Spellman with the title The King's True Children, a king has six wives, and yet no children. One day, he finds himself a beautiful princess whom he makes his seventh wife. When the seventh queen is pregnant, they become jealous of her, and, after the king leaves on a hunt, the queen's first child, a son, is taken from her, cast in the river in a basket and replaced by a stone. The baby prince is rescued by an old fisherman, who takes the boy to raise with his wife. The next year, the seventh queen gives birth to a girl, who is also cast in the river by the jealous co-queens and replaced by another stone. Tricked by his co-wives, the king demotes his seventh spouse to shoo away crows in the garden. As for the children, the fisherman couple raises them until, on day, the boy has a dream about a yogi beckoning him on a pilgrimage towards a sacred stream. Deciding to chase the vision from his dream, the elder sibling departs and journeys beyond mountains until he finds the yogi near the sacred stream. The holy man gives him a catamaran, two water pots, and warns the boy to always look ahead while on the river, and to not look back. The boy follows the yogi's warnings and sails to the source of the river, deep into a cave, but demons in the deep darkness of the cave frighten and grab at his clothes, he turns his head to glance behind. Back at the fisherman's cottage, the female sibling realizes her elder brother is in danger and follows the same trail to the yogi. She meets the holy man and is given the same instructions: the girl sails on the catamaran and always looks straight ahead, until she reaches the source of the stream and fills the water pots with the liquid. The cave suddenly illuminates and she finds the unmoving figures of pilgrims and sprinkles the water on them, reverting their immobile state. She reunites with her elder brother and they return home. Later, the king learns of the girl's deed and pays the fisherman's cottage a visit with his six co-queens, the seventh their servant and fanning them. The fisherman tells the story of how he found the children floating in the river, and the seventh queen realizes the pair are her children. The king hears the queen's story, proving the injustice done to her, then banishes the elder co-queens to wander the forest, and reinstates his children and their mother.

==== Simla ====
Author Alice Elizabeth Dracott collected a tale from Simla with the title The Enchanted Bird, Music and Stream. In this tale, a prince likes to disguise himself as a poor man and mingle with his subjects. One day, while walking through a gulley, he overhears three sisters talking: the elder wants to marry a prince's servant, the middle one the prince's cook, and the youngest the prince himself. The next day, the prince sends for the three sisters and fulfills their marriage wishes. Some time later, the youngest sister, now the prince's wife, gives birth to a son. The elder sister, jealous of their cadette's fortunate marriage, replace the boy for a puppy and throw him in the stream in a box. The prince's gardener finds the boy and raises him as his own son. In the following years, the princess gives birth to two other children (a boy that is replaced by a kitten and a girl that is replaced by a rat), who are also cast in the river, but are saved by the gardener. The Prince, enraged at his wife, banishes her from the palace. As for the siblings, the gardener asks the Prince for a portion of land to live, and takes the children with him: the boys go hunting while the girl stays home. One day, an old woman pays the siblings' a visit, and says their house lacks a bird, music, and a stream of water. The girl tells her older brothers she wants the three things and they go on a quest for them. The elder brother fails in his quest and is turned to stone, and so does the middle brother. The girl ventures alone up a mountain and captures a talking bird in a cage. The bird then tells her to break a branch of a nearby tree and plant it on the ground, since it will produce music when the breeze blows through it; and to take some water from a stream. She also sprinkles the water on some stone and restores her brothers to life. At the end of the tale, the three siblings invite the Prince to their house and prepare a meal of kheer with a dish of pearls. The Prince remarks he cannot eat the pearls, and the bird replies to him that he believed his wife, the princess, gave birth to animals.

==== Jammu ====
Noriko Mayeda and W. Norman Brown collected a tale from Jammu from an informant named Des Raj Chopra. In this tale, titled The Slandered Queen, Khalifa Haroun-al-Rashid wanders the city streets at night and spies on three sisters talking: the elder wants to marry the king's cook; the middle one the king's butler; and the youngest the king himself, and bear him two sons and a daughter "of beautiful complexion". The king takes them to his court the next morning, and fulfills their marriage wishes. Jealous of their sister's good fortune, the queen's sisters replace the royal children (two golden-haired boys and a girl, born in consecutive years) for animals and throw them in the water. The children are saved by the king's gardener, and, years later, they are sent for a talking bird that knows the future, the golden coloured water and a tree that produces melodies when wind rustles its leaves.

In another tale from Jammu, also collected by Mayeda and Brown as a variant of The Slandered Queen, a king has three wives, and no son yet. One day, the oldest co-wife announces she is pregnant, to the jealousy of the other two, who conspire to take the child and son as they are born and cast them in the water. The child's two brothers, bron in the next years, are also cast in the water. All three are saved by a man who was fishing, and are raised by a wise man. Years later, they live a comfortable house with a beautiful garden. One day, the king passes by their garden and compliments it, but says it lacks the golden water and the celestial bird. The two brothers go on a quest for these two items, but fail and are turned into marble statues; their sister finishes the quest, saves them, and brings the objects home.

Mayeda and Brown summarized a tale collected by Jit Kour: a king has seven wives and no son yet. He decides to travel around until he stops by a house where maidens are talking among themselves, and the most beautiful of them states an astrologer predicted her future: she is to bear "two handsome boys" and "a lovely daughter". The king takes her as his eighth wife, to the chagrin of the other seven wives, who conspire to degrade her: as soon as the children are born (in three consecutive pregnancies), the queens take the children and cast them in the river, replacing them for monkeys. The children are saved and raised by a fisherman. Years later, an old woman visits the siblings' house and tells them to seek a sparrow that can talk. The brothers fail, but their sister takes the bird and sprinkles holy water to restore them to life. The sparrow then reveals the truth to the king during a banquet.

==== Odisha ====
In an Orissan tale titled Sunā Jharanā ('The Golden Shower'), collected in 1918 from a source in Nilgiri, near Balasore, a king has three children, two boys and a girl. Their mother dies, and the king remarries. At first, the stepmother likes the children, but after some time she begins to nurture hatred towards them. One day, she orders a maid to kill the children in the forest, while the king is told a lie that the siblings have travelled to visit their mother's people. The maid spares the children and only abandons them in the forest, while she reports to the queen she killed them. Back to the children, a rishi finds them and provides some magical help: he gives them a golden deer that can grant them anything they wish for, and a magical ring that signals whenever the elder brothers are in danger. Later, a foret ranger discovers the children and tells the queen. The queen then hires a witch to get rid of the children. The witch goes to the siblings' forest house and convinces them to search for a golden spring atop a mountain. The elder brother goes and meets a wise man on the path, who warns them the spring is inside a temple guarded by serpents and a bird that can petrify anyone that responds to it. Despite the warning, the elder brother fails. The younger brother goes to fetch himself the water and also fails. The sister, seeing the diamond ring has changed colour, goes to the temple and douses herself in the golden spring, all the while ignoring the bird. Soon after, the bird advises her to pluck a feather of its tail and touch the petrified brothers. They are restored and return home. At the end of the tale, the king, their father, finds his children in their forest house and bring them home, then executes his second wife.

==== Uttara Kannada ====
In a South Indian tale from Karavali Uttara Kannada with the title "ಮಾತನಾಡುವ ಗಿಳಿ ಚಿನ್ನದ ಬಾವಿ" ("The Talking Parrot of the Golden Well"), a king has two wives, and still no child, so he takes a third wife. The third wife becomes pregnant, to the co-wives' jealousy, who conspire to humiliate their rival: she gives birth to a son in the first pregnancy, who is replaced by a stone and cast in the water; a second son in the second pregnancy, who is also replaced for a stone and cast in the water, and a girl in the third pregnancy, who is replaced by a boom and cast in the water. The children are rescued each time by a farmer. Years later, the children are visited by a monk who tells the sister about a talking parrot and a well of golden water up a nearby hill. The elder brother offers to fetch them and tells her sister to watch out for the tulsi plant: if it withers, it means something bad has happened to him. The elder brother fails in his quest, so the middle brother goes after him. He also fails, and their younger sister goes up the hill. She goes up the hill and draws some water from the well, then sprinkles on some people to revive them, including her elder brothers. The talking parrot flies to them and they return home. Some time later, the king sees them during a hunt and invites them to their palace, but the brothers invite the monarch to their house. During the meal, the parrot utters that father and children are sitting together to eat. The next day, the king takes the children to the castle, when they notice their mother is not there, so the king sends for his third wife, who is bathed and dressed in a sari. Mother and children reunite, and the king orders his co-wives to be beheaded.

== Adaptations ==
The 1979 Indian Bengali-language film Arun Barun O Kiranmala was also based on this folktale.
