= Saat Bhai Champa (TV series) =

- Genre: Soap opera
- Created by: Surinder Singh
- Based on: Saat Bhai Champa from Thakurmar Jhuli by Dakshinaranjan Mitra Majumder
- Written by: Sayantani Bhattacharya; Rupa Banerjee; Priyanka Seth
- Directed by: Rajat Paul; Suman Das
- Starring: Promita Chakraborty; Rudrajit Mukherjee; Samrat Mukherjee; Sudipta Banerjee; Sonali Chowdhury
- Theme music composer: Madhuraa Bhattacharya
- Opening theme: "Saat Bhai Champa"
- Composer: Debjit Roy
- Country of origin: India
- Original language: Bengali
- No. of episodes: 454 (list of episodes)

Production
- Producers: Surinder Singh; Nispal Singh
- Production location: Kolkata
- Cinematography: Paritosh Singh
- Running time: 22 minutes
- Production company: Surinder Films

Original release
- Network: Zee Bangla
- Release: 27 November 2017 – 3 March 2019

Saat Bhai Champa was an Indian Bengali fantasy television soap opera that premiered on 27 November 2017 and aired on Zee Bangla. It is produced by Surinder Films and stars Pramita Chakraborty, Rudrajit Mukherjee and Sudipta Banerjee. The show is dubbed in Hindi as "Shoorveer sister" (aired on Big Magic channel) & "Parul" (on Zee TV). The Odia dubbed version is aired on Zee Sarthak. It was premiered on 27 November 2017 and aired on Zee Bangla. It went off air on 3 March 2019 and it got replaced by Trinayani. It is based on the folktale of Saat Bhai Champa as collected in Thakurmar Jhuli by Dakshinaranjan Mitra Majumder.

== Plot ==
The selfish queens led by the 1st queen Manimallika of King Mahendra of Surjanagar try to kill the seven sons and one daughter of the seventh queen Padmavati. The seven brothers become Champa flowers. The daughter Parul is rescued by the maid. Through a series of adventures Princess Parul has to bring back alive her seven long-lost brothers (who are now Champa flowers) and reunite her family. She finds brave Raghav as her partner and evil witch Rani Manimallika as her main enemy. On the day of the wedding, Raghav gets lost, was made a king of another country by an elephant. One wicked sorcerer and the evil queen are behind all of this. Princess Parul rescues him and kills Manimallika with the help of her friends. She marries Raghav and lives happily ever after in Surjanagar.

== Cast ==
=== Main ===
- Promita Chakraborty / Roosha Chatterjee as Parul.
- Rudrajit Mukherjee as Senapati Raghavendra

=== Recurring ===
- Samrat Mukherji as Mahendra / Surendra.
- Sudipta Banerjee as Rakkhosi Rani Monimallika (dead)
- Solanki Roy / Sonali Chowdhury as Rani Padmavati: Parul's mother and Mahendra's wife
- Manasi Sengupta as Rani Swetanghshi.
- Liza Goswami as Rani Lolontika.
- Sayantani Guhathakurta as Rani Dakahini.
- Priyanka Rati Pal as Rani Bonhisikha.
- Nayana Bandyopadhyay as Rani Maya and a mermaid Sankhomala.
- Sabyasachi Chowdhury as King Nakshatrajyoti
- Tania Ganguly as Komolini
- Rupsha Mukhopadhyay as Urmimala
- Shambhabvi Mukherjee as Mukta: Sankhomala daughter
- Mayna Banerjee as Gaitri Dashi
- Boni Mukherjee as Raghav's mother
- Palash Ganguly as Veer Pratap
- Madhubani Goswami as Rani Rukmini.
