= Byangoma =

Legendary birds of Bengali folklore

Byangoma (Bengali ব্যাঙ্গমা, feminine Byangomi ব্যাঙ্গমী) are legendary human-faced birds of Bengali folklore, appearing notably in the fairytales of Thakurmar Jhuli, where they are portrayed as wise, fortune-telling birds that help the deserving.

In Thakurmar Jhuli by Dakshinaranjan Mitra Majumder, the fairy-tale "Lalkamal Neelkamal" describe how the nestlings of these birds are sightless at birth and how few drops of blood from a donor can activate their sight. Lalkamal and Neelkamal are the eponymous princes who seek help from these birds living on a tree at the edge of Tepantorer Math (The Field of Three Horizons). The birds display remarkable strength in carrying the princes on their backs safely across the very large field. The book also contains illustrations of the birds drawn by the author.

The Victoria Memorial houses a painting by Abanindranath Tagore, captioned "ব্যাঙ্গমা-ব্যাঙ্গমী". The English title is "The vision anybird" (1939). In Abanindranath's version, the birds are smaller and do not have human faces.
