= Kiranmala (TV series) =

Bengali television serial

- Genre: Fantasy; Drama
- Created by: Surinder Films
- Based on: Thakurmar Jhuli by Dakshinaranjan Mitra Majumder
- Written by: Writam Ghosal
- Screenplay by: Writam Ghosal, Arpita Chattopadhyay
- Directed by: Shrejit Roy & Sumanta Bannerjee
- Starring: Rooqma Ray; Chandrayee Ghosh; Farhan Imroze
- Opening theme: Kiranmala by Madhuraa Bhattacharya
- Composer: Indraadip Dasgupta
- Country of origin: India
- Original language: Bengali
- No. of seasons: 1
- No. of episodes: 721

Production
- Producers: Nispal Singh; Surinder Singh
- Running time: 21/22 minutes
- Production company: Surinder Films

Original release
- Network: Star Jalsha
- Release: 4 August 2014 – 19 November 2016

Kiranmala is an Indian Bengali language television series which aired on Star Jalsha from 4 August 2014 to 19 November 2016. It was produced by Surinder Films and starred Rooqma Ray, Farhan Imroze and Chandrayee Ghosh. It was based on traditional folktales of the same name collected in Thakurmar Jhuli by Dakshinaranjan Mitra Majumder. The series was dubbed into Hindi, Tamil, and Odia and broadcast on Star Plus, Star Vijay and Tarantg TV. It returned in March 2020 due to the COVID-19 pandemic. The series re-aired a third time on Jalsha Movies on 13 May 2024.The series re-aired a 4th time on Colors Bangla 28 June 2026.

== Plot ==
King Bijoy is the king of Achinpur. After winning a battle, his mother/Rajmata takes him to a secret room of the palace and shows him that the imprisonment of the demons will come to an end which was given to them by his father. She also tells him that of the ancestors' prophecy that a princess named Kiranmala will be born in their royal family who will save the world from the demons. But demons Queen Paykati and her daughter Katkati learned of the prophecy and plot a plan. According to their plan, Paykati goes to the royal place as a nurse for Queen Rupmoti and at the time of Rupmoti's labour time, she switches baby Kiranmala with frogs and rats. After this she throws Kiranmala in the sea, but she is saved by a fisherman and his wife and they care for Kiranmala as their daughter along with their sons. Paykati accuses Rupmoti of being a witch and everyone, including Rajmata and the king, believe her and throw Rupmoti out of the palace. 18 years later, they start forming an entire team of demons including Pishachini, Bajramala, Donkar and Bitkel. Kiranmala falls in love with Donkar's stepbrother Kumar Prithviraj, making Donkar jealous of Prithviraj. Bajramala becomes jealous of Kiranmala because Bajramala loves Prithviraj. However, Kiranmala and Prithviraj end up married. They give birth to Alokmala, who changes the jealousy in Bajramala and Donkar's heart into love. Katkati becomes angry and tries to destroy Achinpur and Amrita Nagari. Kiranmala dies by suicide to save the world from Katkati. She and Katkati both go to Mokhsa (Kingdom of Death), where Kiranmala is rewarded with Svarga, while Katkati, Pyakati, Pishachini and Bitkel are left to suffer in Naraka.Then, Alokmala went there and brought kiranmala again.

== Cast ==
Main

- Rukma Roy as Rajkumari Kiranmala / Urmimala / Jhinukmala (triple role): king Bijoy and Queen Rupmati's daughter; Kumar's wife; Alokmala's mother
- Farhan Imroze as Rajkumar Prithviraj/Kumar

Recurring

- Kaushik Chakraborty as Raja Bijoy: Kiranmala's father
- Aditi Chatterjee as Rani Rupmati: Kiranmala's mother
- Chandrayee Ghosh as Rakkoshi Rani Katkati/ Kotimaa (dead)
- Chaitali Chakraborty as Pyakati / Kotkoti's mother (dead)
- Adolina Chakraborty as Alokmala/Hingting(Kiranmala's daughters)
- Arjun Chakraborty as Nakula
- Sonamana Arinsha as Sonamoni
- Moumita Gupta as Raj Mata / Kiranmala's grandmother
- Subhra Sourav Das as Donkar
- Ronit Modak as Bitkel (dead)
- Joymala Ganguly as Lalona
- Sumanta Mukherjee
- Mafin Chakraborty as Maya Pari / Maya Arshi
- Indradev Banerjee as Barun
- Chhanda K Chatterjee as Bodyi Buri
- Anirban Bhattacharya as Kaal Tapaswi
- Riya Ganguly Chakraborty / Sayantani Guha Thakurata / Shreyasee Samanta as Shankhini / Chhalonamoyi, Kiranmala's sister, a Naagini.(dead)
- Vivaan Ghoswami as Shuborno kumar
- Kanchana Moitra as Suroshini
- Madhubani Ghoshw as Bajramala / Kotkoti's daughter
- Debjani Chatterjee as Maharani Amrapali: Kumar Prithviraj's mother
- Arijit Chakraborty as Maharaja Bikram Singha / Kumar Prithviraj's father
- Sayan Chakraborty as Alien

== Reception ==
The serial was promoted by many film personalities from Tollywood like Koel Mallick and Raj Chakraborty in the last episode of the latter serial on 3 August 2014. The series had also become popular in neighboring Bangladesh, where several people have clashed over it at a village in the Habiganj District, injuring 100 people.

At the Kolkata Book Fair, seven children from Kolkata met Rukma Roy (who plays Kiranmala) at the stall of Star Jalsha. The actress said:

Happy that the work of famed fantasy writer Dakshinaranjan Mitra Majumder will be introduced to the largely uninitiated audience of Gen Next as well as others. Replete with palace, forts and 'raj-durbar' Kiranmala by Star Jalsha will bring a change in the usual look of Bengali serials after many years.

== Television special ==
A telefilm named Kiranmala has been premiered on STAR Jalsha on 15 March 2015 featuring June Malia as the queen of time.
