= Arun Barun O Kiranmala =

1979 Bengali film

- DVD cover of the film
- Directed by: Barun Kabasi
- Based on: Thakurmar Jhuli by Dakshinaranjan Mitra Majumder
- Produced by: Dolphin Films
- Starring: See below
- Music by: Amal Mukhopadhyay
- Production company: Dolphin Films
- Release date: 1979
- Country: India
- Language: Bengali

Arun Barun O Kiranmala (also known as: Arun-Barun-Kiranmala) is a 1979 Indian Bengali-language fantasy film, directed by Barun Kabasi and produced by Dolphin Films. It is based on the tale Kiranmala, compiled in Dakshinaranjan Mitra Majumder's collection of fairy tales, Thakurmar Jhuli.

== Plot ==
Arun, Barun and Kiranmala are orphaned siblings. One day they go in search of their parents. They first visit the Jogini Durbar where they are helped with magical items like a golden stick. Then they go to Maya Puri where they find fairy spirits trapped by the witch of the Maya Puri. After overcoming many hurdles they finally kill the witch and help the fairy spirits to escape. The fairies then promise to tell them about their parents in return. The children are taken for lunch to the Jogini Durbar where the king of Arabia also joins them. It is soon discovered that the three children are the children of this king. The five fairies reveal how the sister of the king's wife played tricks and set the three children afloat in the river for which the king punished his wife and banished her from the palace. The story ends with a happy reunion as Arun, Barun & Kiranmala find their parents and all live happily ever after.

== Cast ==
- Tarun Kumar
- Dilip Ray as the King
- Master Partho as Arun
- Master Supratim as Barun
- Tapati Manna as Kiranmala
- Jnanesh Mukhopadhyay
- Nimu Bhowmik
- Satya Bandyopadhyay
- Alpana Goswami
- Chhaya Debi
- Padma Devi
- Jhumur Gangopadhyay
