= Saat Bhai Champa =

Bengali folk tale

Saat Bhai Champa (Bengali: সাত ভাই চম্পা, Sāt Bhāi Champā) or Sat Bhai Chompa is a popular folk tale in the Bengal region in the eastern part of the Indian subcontinent. The story was first officially published by Dakshinaranjan Mitra Majumder in the book Thakurmar Jhuli in 1907. The introduction to Thakurmar Jhuli was written by Nobel laureate Rabindranath Tagore. A more detailed version of the story was published by Bishnu Dey under the name "Sat Bhai Champa" in 1944.

The tale is classified in the Aarne-Thompson-Uther Index as tale type ATU 707, "The Three Golden Children", a cycle of stories in which a woman promises a king she will bear a child or children with wonderful attributes, but her jealous relatives or the king's wives plot against the babies and their mother.

== Plot ==
Once upon a time, there lived a king. The king was not able to produce any heir to the throne through his three wives. The king was depressed and spent a large amount of time by himself in the forest. A priest in the forest saw the king's misery and gave him mangoes of bearing. The priest instructed the king to feed the fruits to his wives, and then they would conceive children. The king gave his three wives the fruits as instructed by the priest. Two elder queens did not produce any children, as they ate it with disbelief. However, the younger queen gave birth to octuplets: seven boys and one girl, when the king was on a voyage. The elder queens became jealous and buried the babies in the garden before the younger queen gained consciousness from pregnancy. The babies magically blossom into seven champak flowers and a trumpet flower. The last baby, the girl, was born some time after the first seven babies, in a time when the elder queens left the room with seven babies, and this enabled the maid to hide the baby from the elder queens. She named the child Parul. Elder queens, then, placed seven puppies on the younger queen's bedside and claimed the queen gave birth to seven puppies. Parul grew up in the forest. After learning her origin from her maid, she helped to revive her brothers into princes.

=== Variants ===
Another variant of the story has it that seven babies turned into seven puppies.

In a Bengali variant of the story, published by author Geeta Majumdar with the title The Story of the Seven Brothers and a Sister, a nameless rajah has seven wives, the oldest named Premlata and the youngest Sulata. After a long time of praying to God for a child, the youngest queen, Sulata, becomes pregnant. The other six queens become jealous and enraged at the youngest's luck and conspire against her. When the time of labor is upon Sulata, her eight children - seven boys and a girl - are taken from her and thrown in a hole in the garden, and animals are put in their place. The king sees the animals in the cradle and banishes Sulata. Some time later, the king's gardener finds a champa tree in the garden with beautiful flowers. He tries to pluck some to give to the king, but the flowers move about the branch. The gardener summons the king to witness the strange occurrence. When the king himself tries to get one of the eight flowers on the branch, the flowers move out of reach, and a voice tells him to summon the eldest queen. She comes and notices the champa tree sprouted where she and the other queens buried the children. She fails to get any flower. This happens to the other five queens until the voice tells them to summon Sulata. The disgraced queen, now wearing tatters and looking emaciated, is brought to the champa tree. When she tries to get the flowers, her seven sons come out of the champa buds and her daughter from the parul bud. The king learns of the truth and condemns Premlata and the other queens to be buried alive in a pit filled with thorns and brambles.

In a West Bengali tale published by author Pranab Chandra Roy Choudhury with the title Seven Champa Brothers and Sister Parul, a king has seven queens, the first six arrogant, but the youngest demure and loved best by the king. One day, the seventh queen is pregnant, which fuels the bitter jealousy of the co-queens. The king gives her a bell at the end of a cord to ring if she needs something, but the seventh queen rings it too many times, which annoys the king. Finally, she gives birth to eight children, seven boys and a girl, who are taken by the co-queens and buried under a dung heap, and replaced by puppies and a kitten. The king, seeing the little animals, banishes the seventh queen to the menial position of cleaning the cowshed. Back to the children, eight trees sprout: seven Champak or Champa flower trees, and one Parul flower. Some time later, the king's gardener tries to pluck the flowers, but the trees begin to speak and call for the co-queens to come. They also cannot get the flowers. The king himself comes and also cannot take the flowers. Lastly, the disgraced queen comes and plucks the flowers; her children come back to life.

In a Bengali language tale published by author Ashutosh Bhattacharjya with the title সাত ভাই চম্প। (পাঠাস্তর) ("Saat Bhai Champa"), a king has two queens, and yet no son. He dotes on the younger queen, to the elder queen's consternation. Thus, the elder queen conspires with a midwife, bribing her to place a wooden doll in the royal child's cradle as soon as they are born, be it a boy or a girl. In time, the younger queen becomes pregnant and gives birth to a girl, who is replaced with a wooden doll and thrown in an ash heap. The king, called Shantaraj, brings an astrologer, who divines that the next child will be a son, but he will be cursed. It happens thus, and the younger queen gives birth to a boy, who is replaced by a brick and thrown in the ash heap. This continues on with the king's next six sons. Dismayed for not having heirs, the king strips the younger queen of her royal rank and banishes her to a cowshed in tatters, as the elder queen delights in her rival's sufferings. Some time later, a storm washes away the royal garden so that there are no flowers left, so the gardener goes to look for some flowers and finds the parul flower ("parulphul") and champa flowers ("tapaphul") in the ash heap. He tries to pluck them, but the parul flower asks brothers if he can have them. The champa brothers tell her to deny his request and move away. The gardener informs the king about it, who also tries to pluck the flowers, but they deny him. Next, the elder queen is brought to try her luck, and still the flowers move away. Finally, the disgraced queen, her hands soiled with dung and wearing tatters, comes to pluck the flowers. Suddenly, angels come from the sky, and the eight flowers are restored to the form of seven princes and a princess, all shouting for their mother. The king realizes these are his children, orders the elder queen to be buried alive, and restores the younger co-queen as his wife.

In a Bengali tale sourced from Bangladesh titled "আশ্চর্য ফুলগাছ আর আটটি ফুলের গল্প" ("The Story of the Wonderful Tree and the Eight Flowers"), the king's gardener, Gokul, is alarmed with the state of the royal gardens, since they are now dried up, and supposes it was due to the scandal involving the king's seventh wife, who was a beautiful woman inside and out. She collected flowers for their daily devotions, and cared for the other six queens, which earned her their jealousy. The king liked the seventh queen more, and was very happy when she was pregnant. The six co-queens offered to look after her as her midwives. When the seventh queen was in labour, she gave birth to seven boys and a girl, whom the six co-queens got rid of. The seventh queen asked her colleagues about her children. They lied to her that she gave birth to a dog, a cat, and some kittens, and urged the woman to leave the palace in shame. It happened thus, and the seventh queen left the palace with tattered clothes, moving out to a hut in the forest, while the king withdrew himself out of grief, while the six queens began to hound gardener Gokul. Presently, the gardener notices the garden is all dried up. Some time later, Gokul notices a strange flower in a corner of the garden, yielding beautiful flowers: seven white-crowned champa flowers and a pink-crowned parul. Gokul admires their beauty and goes to pluck the lower placed parul, but the tree moves its branches out of reach, due to the champa flowers saying that only the king can remove them. Gokul alerts the king of the incident, and the monarch goes to have a go at plucking the flowers, but the flowers ask for the seventh queen's presence. She is brought to the vicinity of the tree in a dishevelled state, and the eight flowers lament that their mother is in such a sorry state, then denounce the trickery and jealousy of the king's six co-queens. When the seventh queen approaches the tree, the flowers fall on her lap and turn into seven golden-breasted boys and a milk-white girl. The queen embraces her children, and the whole garden is restored to life. The king confronts his six co-wives about their deception, which they admit to, then orders them to be buried alive. He takes his wife and children back to the palace with him.

In a Bengali language tale titled সাত ভাই চম্পা। ("Seven Brothers Champa"), a king has two queens, one elder and the other younger, whom he dotes on, to the elder's jealousy. In time, the younger queen becomes pregnant, which makes the king love her even more. The elder queen feigns friendliness and wishes to help the other in her labour: she blindfolds the younger queen, who gives birth to a girl; the midwife replaces the girl with a wooden doll and buries her in an ash heap. The following year, the younger queen becomes pregnant again, and gives birth to a boy, whom the elder queen and the midwife replace for a brick and bury in the same ash heap as his elder sister. This goes on for the following pregnancies, until the queen has given birth to eight children (a girl and seven boys), all buried under the ash heap. After a string of false pregnancies, the king banishes the younger queen to the cowshed. Sometime later, the king's father has died, and people arrive to render him homage. A Brahmin wants to offer some flowers and goes to the king's garden, where he finds parul flowers and champa flowers by the ash heap. The Brahmin tries to pluck some, but the parul asks her brothers, the champa flowers, if they should allow him to pluck any flower; the brothers say that the flowers are for the one by the cowshed. The Brahmin enters the palace to inform the king of the strange occurrence, and he is mocked by the crowd. Still, some soldiers go to investigate, then return to report the same incident. Soon, it is the minister's turn, and finally the king's, who all cannot pluck any flowers. The king sends for the younger queen, who goes to the garden and approaches the tree. She goes to pluck a flower, and it turns into a boy. The parul and the champa flowers agree to let the younger queen have the flowers, so she touches them, and the flowers turn into her children, to the crowd's astonishment. The king is told that the younger queen would indeed have seven boys and a girl, but the elder queen's treachery cursed them. For this, the king buries the elder queen in a pit and retakes the younger queen and their children.

In a Bangladeshi tale from Kishoreganj with the title "চম্পা ও তার সাত ভাই" ("Champa and Her Seven Brothers"), a king has seven queens, the elder six arrogant and the youngest gentle and kind, whom he favoured above the others. The king is childless, until the day when the youngest queen is ready to give birth to her children. The king is joyful and opens the royal treasury to mark the occasion, to the elder queens' jealousy. The king ties a golden chain to the youngest queen to announce the child's birth. The elder queens convince the king to let them attend their co-queen during birth. The queens tug at the chain to summon the king, who arrives and sees no child is born yet, so he complains about it. While he is away, the seventh queen gives birth to seven sons and a daughter. The seventh queen wishes to see her children, but the elder queens lie that she gave birth to rats and crabs. On hearing this, the seventh queen faints, opening a window for the co-queens to hide the children in earthen jars and bury them in a trash heap, then place froglets and rats to foll the king. They tug at the golden chain to summon the king, and he sees the little animals instead of human babies. For this, he banishes the seventh queen from the palace and diminishes her to collect cow-dung cakes for fuel. Days pass, and sadness takes hold in the king's heart. The gardener wishes to decorate the palace with some flowers, but cannot find any in the garden, except in a tree growing in the trash heap. The king asks the gardener to fetch such flowers. The gardener approaches the tree and tries to pluck them, but the parul flower asks her champa brothers if the gardener is allowed to pluck the flowers. The champa flowers answer that they should bring the king first, and raise themselves. The gardener returns and brings back the king. Still, the parul asks the champa flowers if the king can have any flowers, and the champa flowers reply that the queens should come first. The king brings the co-queens, and still the flowers do not allow the queens to touch the tree, so they mention the disgraced queen who collected cow-dung. The king finally brings the youngest queen, her garments in tatters, for her to pluck the flowers: the flowers lower themselves, open up and out of the flowers emerge the seven princes and the princess, who acknowledge the disgraced queen as their mother. The king cries tears of happiness for his children, orders the co-queens to be beheaded, and returns to the palace with his eight children and the seventh queen.

== Translations ==
The tale was translated by Francis Bradley Bradley-Birt into English as The Seven Brothers who were turned into Champa Trees and published in 1920 in the book Bengal Fairy Tales. Author Sayantani DasGupta published the tale as The Seven Brothers Champak.

The tale was also translated into French as Les Sept Fleurs de Champaka et la Fleur de Paroul ("The Seven Champaka Flowers and the Parul Flower") and published in 1923.

Indologist Heinz Mode and Arun Ray translated the tale into German as Die sieben Champakabrüder ("The Seven Champaka Brothers").

== Analysis ==
=== Tale type ===
According to Types of Indic Oral Tales, established by folklorists Stith Thompson and Warren Roberts to classify South Asian tales, the story belongs to tale type 707, The Three Golden Sons, wherein a queen gives birth to children, who are taken from her by jealous co-wives and buried in the garden; the siblings then transform into trees whose flowers only their mother can pluck. The Indic tale corresponds to tale type ATU 707, "The Three Golden Children", of the international Aarne-Thompson-Uther Index. In their joint work, researcher Noriko Mayeda and Indologist W. Norman Brown listed Bradley-Birt's translation as belonging to the same type, under a form that appears locally in India: the children of a slandered queen are stolen and killed, but reincarnate into flowers. Heinz Mode and Arun Ray also classified the tale they translated as type ATU 707.

== Arts ==
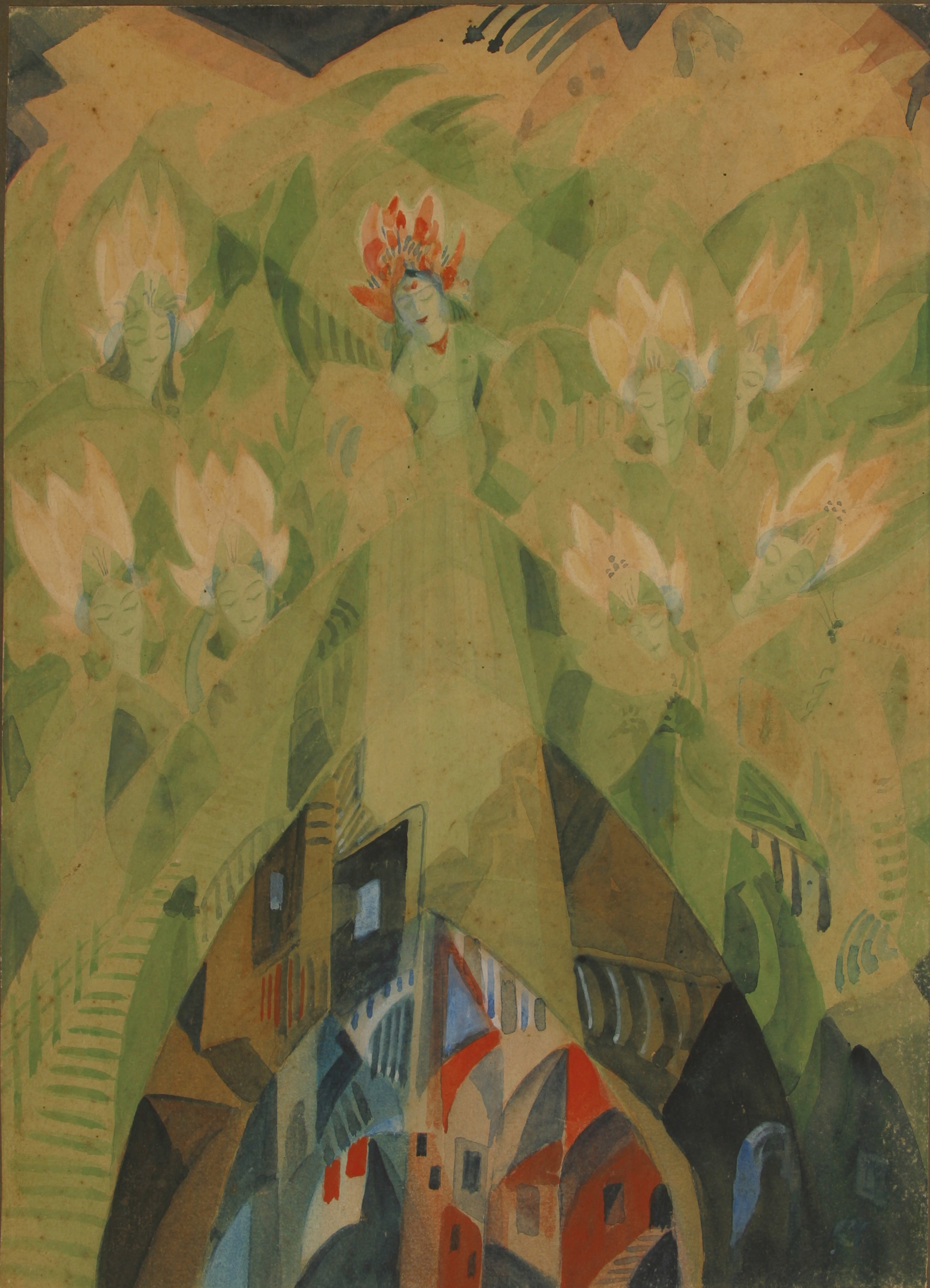
Sat-Bhai Champa by Gaganendranath Tagore; c. 20th century, watercolour, 34 × 25 cm, Victoria Memorial, Kolkata.

Sat-Bhai Champa painting by Gaganendranath Tagore is considered a masterpiece in contemporary Indian art. The painting is currently located at the Academy of Fine Arts of Calcutta.

== Adaptations ==
Several Bengali films have been made based on the Saat Bhai Champa story, including:

- Sat Bhai Chompa (1968 film) - The movie was made in East Pakistan, what is now Bangladesh. The director of the movie is Dilip Shome and the main cast members are Kabori and Khan Ataur Rehman. The movie is ranked by the British Film Institute as one of the top ten Bangladeshi films of all time.
- Saat Bhai Champa (1978 film) - The movie was made in West Bengal, India. The movie was directed by Chitrasarathi, and the music of the film was composed by Raghunath Das. The actors starring are Biswajeet, Sandhya Roy, Mrinal Mukherjee, Gita Karmakar, Biswanath Chattopadhyay, and Chhanda Chattopadhyay
- Saat Bhai Champa (2017–19 TV series) is an Indian fantasy drama television series that aired on Zee Bangla.

== See also ==
- The Boy with the Moon on his Forehead
- The Boys with the Golden Stars
- Champa Si Ton
- The Real Mother (Indian folktale)
