= Thakurmar Jhuli =

Bengali fairytales

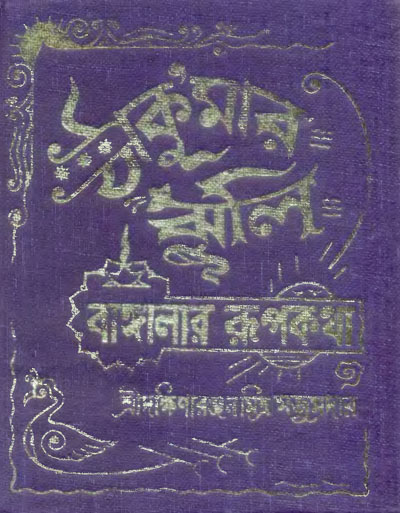
- Cover design of Thakurmar Jhuli (1907)
- Author: Dakshinaranjan Mitra Majumder
- Language: Bengali
- Subject: Children's Literature
- Published: 1907
- Publisher: Mitra & Ghosh Publishers Pvt. Ltd.
- Publication place: India

Thakurmar Jhuli (Bengali: ঠাকুরমার ঝুলি; Grandmother's Bag [of tales]) is a collection of Bengali folk tales and fairy tales. The author Dakshinaranjan Mitra Majumder collected some folktales of Bengali and published some of them under the name of "Thakurmar Jhuli" in 1907 (1314 of Bengali calendar). The Nobel-Laureate, Rabindranath Tagore wrote the introduction to the anthology. Since then, it has become iconic in Bengali children's literature, becoming a household name in West Bengal and Bangladesh over the years.

Certain characters and stories like "Lalkamal-Nilkamal", "Buddhu-Bhutum" and "Byangoma-Byangomi", have gained legendary status. Hundreds of editions of this book have been published from Bangladesh and West Bengal since the original publication.

== Publishing background ==
Rabindranath Tagore notes in his introduction to Thakurmar Jhuli, that there was a dire need for folk literature of Bengal to be revived because the only such works available to the reading public of the time were European fairytales and their translations. He expressed the need for a swadeshi or indigenous folk literature that would remind the people of Bengal of their rich oral traditions. This would be a method of contending the cultural imperialism of the British. Dakshinaranjan recounts the memories of listening to fairytales told by his mother as well as his aunt, in his own introduction to Thakurmar Jhuli. Dakshinaranjan's aunt, Rajlakkhi Debi had given him the duty of visiting the villages in their zamindari. He travelled and listened to Bengali folktales and fairytales being narrated by the village elders. These folk stories were mostly collected from Mymensingh district region of Bangladesh. He recorded this material with a phonograph that he carried, and listened to the recordings repeatedly, imbibing the style. However, he found no publisher initially, and had set up a press to self-publish the first book that would be a compilation of the stories he developed from the recorded tales. At this juncture, Dinesh Chandra Sen, impressed by the manuscript, arranged for it to be published by Bhattacharya and Sons, a renowned publisher of the time. Within a week, three thousand copies were sold. Several illustrations for the collection were also drawn by the author. His drawings were turned into lithographs for printing.

== Contents ==
Audio book release cover

The book contains fourteen stories, divided into three sections: Dudher Sagor ('Sea of Milk'), Rooptarashi ('Scary Form'), and Chyang Byang ('Fish-Frog'). The final section, Aam Sandesh ('Mangoes and Sweets') contains three poems. Apart from this, some other poems act as introductions to the collection as a whole, and to each section.

=== Character types and tropes ===
The first section, Dudher Sagor, contains the very popular stories Kalabati Rajkanya ('Princess Kalabati'), Ghumonto Puri ('The Sleeping Town'), Saat Bhai Champa ('Seven Champa Brothers') and Kiranmala, among others. The former is known elsewhere as "Buddhu Bhutum". These stories, like others in the collection, depict characters who initially suffer a series of misfortunes, display admirable personal qualities, like courage, kindness and wit, and eventually rise to great fortune.

The second section, "Rooptarashi", contains what is probably the most popular story from this iconic volume, "Lalkamal Neelkamal". These stories usually depict human protagonists encountering other creatures like rakkhoshes, magical snakes, and the like. A rakkhosh, or a Rakshasa, is a race of beings from Hindu mythology, who are known from magical abilities, shapeshifting as well as eating humans, sometimes. The birds with human faces, Byangoma and Byangomi, are also encountered in "Lalkamal Neelkamal".

The third section, "Chyang Byang" deals with miscellaneous stories, and features some feats by the proverbial "Sheyal Pandit" (Fox Pandit).

== Language ==
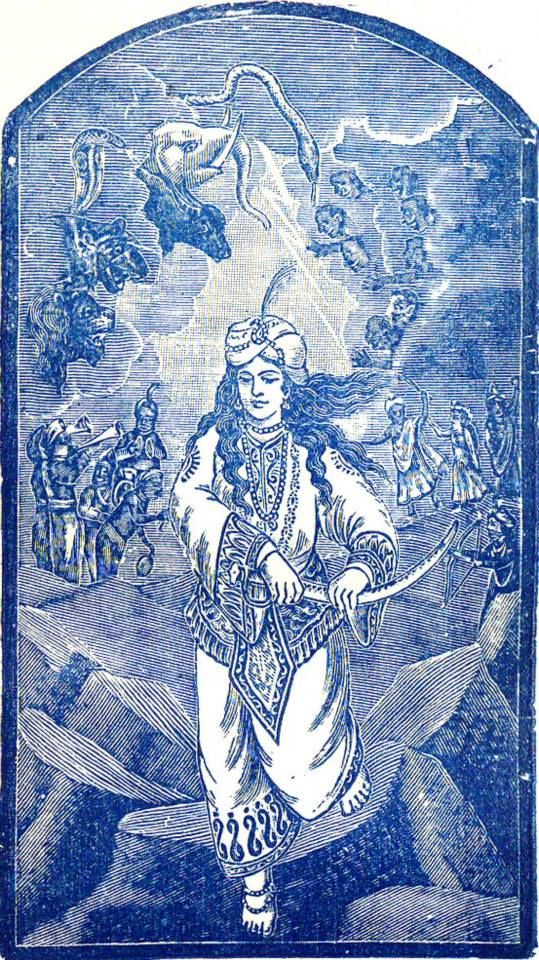
Illustration by Dakshinaranjan Mitra Majumdar for the story "Kiranmala"

In his introduction, Tagore noted that Dakhshinaranjan has successfully put into writing, the linguistic flavour of traditional oral tales. The poems read as collages of references to Bengali culture and folklore motifs.

== Translations ==
- Tales My Grandmother Told Me (2005). English. Translation by Rina Pritish Nandy.
- Tales from Thakurmar Jhuli: Twelve Stories from Bengal. Oxford University Press, 2012. ISBN 9780198082200.

== Film and television ==
- Saat Bhai Champa (1978). Indian Bengali-language film directed by Chitrasathi.
- Arun Barun O Kiranmala (1979). Indian fantasy film directed by Barun Kabasi.
- Thakumar Jhuli, an Indian animated television series which aired on Zee Bangla in the 2000s.
- Kiranmala, an Indian fantasy television series based on some stories of Thakurmar Jhuli, which aired on Star Jalsha channel from 2014 to 2016.
- Buddhu Bhutum (2017). Indian fantasy drama film directed by Nitish Roy.
- Saat Bhai Champa, an Indian Bengali-language fantasy television series that aired on Zee Bangla from 2017 to 2019.
- Thakurmar Jhuli, an Indian anthology television series that aired on Star Jalsha in 2019.

== In other media ==
- Audio tapes and CDs.
- Puppet-theatres.
- Children's radio shows narrating the stories with the help of child artists.
- Children's book publications.
- Cartoon Animation

== Legacy ==
The four initial folktale anthologies of Mitra Majumdar are titled after a grandparent, who represents the bygone era and thereby embodies cultural heritage. In the contemporary context, written and digital recordings of these fables seem to have replaced the earlier oral tradition, but Thakurmar Jhuli remains a compilation that is not limited to children alone, and over the years has found tremendous response among the adults. It is a veritable treasure of Bengali literature. It has helped taught countless of children rules of life, mannerism by resulting every story with a certain lesson.
