= The Real Mother =

Fairy tale collected by Alice Elizabeth Dracott

The Real Mother is an Indian folktale collected by Alice Elizabeth Dracott from Simla, wherein a childless king gives mangoes to his co-wives in order to cure their barrenness, and only the youngest queen bears him children, to the others' jealousy. The co-queens decide to kill the children, which are buried and from their graves flowers and fruit trees sprout.

The tale is classified in the Aarne-Thompson-Uther Index as tale type ATU 707, "The Three Golden Children". These tales refer to stories where a girl promises a king she will bear a child or children with wonderful attributes, but her jealous relatives or the king's wives plot against the babies and their mother. Many variants of the tale type are registered in India, although they comprise specific cycles in this country. In one of the cycles, the king's children are buried and transform into flowers or trees whose flowers only their mother can pluck.

== Summary ==
In this tale, a Rajah has no son, despite having seven wives, six who dwell in the palace and the seventh who dwells in a poor mud hut. The Rajah meets a fakir, who orders him to shake up a tree, gather however many mangoes fall, and give them to his ranees. The rajah follows the instructions and give the fruits to the six ranees, but forgets his seventh wife. The poor ranee asks a servant to bring her the mango husks, eats them and becomes pregnant. She gives birth to six sons and one daughter, but the other ranees blindfold her eyes, take the children and cast them in a potter's field to die.

The potter finds the children and raises them. The six ranees learn of this and send an old midwife to give the children chapatis laced with poison. The children eat the chapatis and die, but the Fakir resurrects them with his own blood. The six ranees send the midwife again to poison the children. They die again, and the Fakir orders the potter to dig eight graves, for the children and him.

After they are buried, a mango tree sprouts on each brother's grave, a rose tree on the girl's and a chumpa tree on the Fakir. One day, the Rajah's servants try to pluck the roses from the tree, but a voice from the fakir's grave warns that it is only for their mother. The Rajah goes to the graves and tries to pluck the flowers, and the same voice warns him. He brings the six ranees to try to pluck them, but to no avail. Lastly, the poor ranee is brought to the trees, and the rose branches spread to cover her with flowers. The Fakir rises from his grave with the seven children and tells their story.

== Analysis ==
=== Tale type ===
According to Stith Thompson' and Jonas Balys's index of Indian tales, the tale type ATU 707 shows 44 variants across Indian sources. Researcher Noriko Mayeda and Indologist W. Norman Brown divided Indian variants of type 707 in five groups: (1) quest for wonderful items; (2) reincarnation into flowers; (3) use of wooden horses; (4) children sing a song; (5) miscellaneous.

=== Motifs ===
Folklorist Christine Goldberg, in the entry of the tale type in Enzyklopädie des Märchens, noted that in Indian variants of tale type 707, the children may entice their father to the truth by trying to feed a wooden horse. In others, the children die and are reborn as plants, and only their mother may pluck fruits or flowers from the trees. (Note: A similar sequence is attested in Iran, in a tale from Khorasan with the title Haft Derakht-e Sepidar ('Seven Poplar Trees'): after a girl is expelled from home and her brothers protect her, the brothers die and reincarnate as poplar trees, while their sister joins their transformation and becomes a blooming flower. Later, the king's gardener tries to pluck the flowers, but the girl asks her brothers if she should allow it. This sequence is reported by German scholar Ulrich Marzolph as its own tale type in the Persian Folktale Catalogue, indexed as type *407, "Die Familie in Blumen verwandelt" ("The Family changed into flowers").) (Note: Similarly, Tajik folklorist Klavdia Ulug-Zade collected a Tajik tale titled "Семь братьев и одна сестра" ("Seven Brothers and One Sister"), wherein seven brothers, at the end of the tale, turn into doves and fly away; his sister joins them in their avian transformation and they land in their parents' garden, where the brothers become seven poplar trees and the girl an apple tree that yields fruits; a prince tries to pluck an apple and is refused by the girl's brothers; an old man tries and the brothers agree to let him do it.) French ethnologist Eveline Porée-Maspero noted that Indic variants of type 707 show a theme "well-known" in Indochina: the children are killed and buried, but transform into trees whose flowers only their father or their mother can pluck. Also, in the conclusion of the tale, there is the motif of jets of breastmilk flowing from the children's biological mother.

According to Stith Thompson and Jonas Balys study of motifs of Indian literature and oral folklore, the tale contains the motif T511, "Conception from eating"; T511.1, "Conception from eating fruit", and specific motif T511.1.3, "Conception from eating mango".

== Variants ==
Folklorist Ashraf Siddiqui argued that variants of the tale type were "borrowed" from the Hindus into the oral corpus of the Santals, the Hos and the Birhors.

=== India ===
==== Ho people ====
Bengali folklorist Saratchandra Mitra published a tale from the Ho people, "of the wicked queens type": a raja is married to seven ranis, but has not yet fathered a son. A bramahna tells him to take a stick and beat a tree for seven mangoes and to give the fruits to his seven wives. They eat the fruit, but the seventh eats a partly eaten fruit and gives birth to a "beautiful boy with the face of a mongoose". The other queens replace the boy for a stone and a broom, and later in the story his six half-brothers kill and bury him. A bamboo and a shrub with a beautiful flower sprout. The raja plucks the flower and cuts down the bamboo, and his son reappears.

In another tale from the Ho people, published by Sukumar Haidar with the title The Trials of a Rani, a childless Raja with three wives is visited by a Brahman, who advises him to take a mango from a mango tree and give it to his three wives. Two of them eat the fruit, while the third rani eats the skin and the stone. The latter is the only one to bear a son to the king. The other two ranis, jealous of the luck of the other co-wife, replace the boy for a piece of wood, while dropping the boy in a clay pit next to a lake from where potters take clay from. The Raja sees the piece of wood and banishes his third queen. Meanwhile, the third queen's son crawls out of the pit and falls into the lake, becoming a lotus flower (Kamal-bā). The gardener's wife sees the lotus flowers and tries to grab it, but it floats away in the lake. Some time later, the ranis try to get the lotus, but the flower questions them about their misdeed. The Raja himself tries next, but the lotus flower floats away. Lastly, the banished queen goes to retrieve the flower. Jets of milk escape from her breasts and shoot at the flower, which moves closer and closer to the shore of the lake. The lotus flower turns back into a human boy and the Raja discovers the ruse.

==== Birhor people ====
Indian ethnographer Sarat Chandra Roy collected and a published a tale from the Birhor people. In this tale, titled How the dead and buried children of the Raja were restored to life, a childless rajah is married to seven ranis, but has no son. A Brahman advises him to strike a mango tree with his sword, take as many mangoes as he can and give them to his seven wives. He does, but only manages to get one. Six of the ranis eat the fruit and leave the rind to the seventh. The ones that ate the fruit bear no son, while the seventh becomes pregnant. The king gives her two drums to announce the child's birth: golden for a boy, silver for a girl. She gives birth to twins, a boy and a girl, who are replaced for a broom and a piece of burnt firewood. The twins are thrown in a pit and found by pot-makers, who raise them as their children. Years later, the six ranis notice that the children are alive and give them poisoned bread. The twins eat, die and are buried by the potmakers in the jungle. From the boy's grave, a plantain tree sprouts, and from the girl's a pinjār tree. One day, a king's woodsman tries to pluck a flower from the pinjar tree, but both it and the plantain extend their trunks. The woodsman reports to the king, who goes to the trees and tries to pluck the flower. The same event happens. The king summons his six queens, who also fail to pluck the flower. The rajah summons the seventh queen, who tries to take the flower and both trees return to human form. The rajah learns of the co-wives' deceit and buries them alive in a hole.

==== Bastar State ====
Ethnologist Verrier Elwin collected a tale titled The Jealous Queens, from a Dora-Kurk source in Kaknar, Bastar State. In this tale, a Rani has three children, a son and two daughters. The boy proclaims he wants to marry his sisters. To avoid such a wedding, their mother arranges the boy's marriage to another woman. Even so, he insists he will marry his sisters. Both girls escape to the woods. They beg to a sarai tree to lower its branches for them to climb, then to lead them to a nearby lake to drink water. However, the lake has dried up, so the younger of the two sisters throws her ring into the lake to fill it with water. She then asks her elder sister to retrieve the ring for her. The elder sister dives into the lake and bring the ring to her, but drowns in the process. The girl is now all alone. Some time later, a Raja goes to the lake to shoot some birds and finds the girl atop a mango tree. The Raja takes her as his seventh Rani, since his other six wives haven't born him a son. The seventh queen becomes pregnant and the Rajah gives her a flute of sorrow and a flute of joy to announce the birth of the royal heir. The six cowives blindfold the girl, take the boy as soon as he is born and throw him with cord and placenta in the lake, and announce she gave birth to a broom. Deep in the lake, the boy is rescued by his mother's elder sisters, and his placenta becomes a flower on the surface of the lake. A Brahmin sees the flower and tries to get it, but it retreats to the middle of the lake. The Brahmin tells the Raja. The Raja Saheb, Kuar Saheb and Diwan Saheb go to the lake to get the flower. The boy asks his aunt underwater, who tells him to only give the flower to his mother. The six ranies come and try to get it. Lastly, the seventh rani, who was expelled from the palace, is bathed and brought to the lake. She asks the boy to give her the chapa flower, the dondera flower. The boy comes with the flowers and sits on the rani's lap. The Raja begs for an explanation and the boy reveals she is his mother, the Raja is his father and the six cowives tried to get rid of him. The Raja asks the boy to come live with him. The boy declines, so the Raja kills the six ranis.

==== Dogri language ====
In a Dogri tale titled Chameli dā phul, translated as A Fragrant Flower or Jasmine Flower, a king has seven queens, the youngest of which he favours the best, and still no son, so he prays and worships. One day, his pleas are answered, and the youngest queen is pregnant, to the dismay of the other co-wives. The king gives the queen a drum for her to beat whenever she needs something. However, the jealous co-queens trick their rival into beating the drum many times to annoy their husband and leave her on her own at labour. When the time comes, the seventh queen gives birth to twins, a prince (named Rajkumar) and a princess (Rajkumari), who are replaced by rats, hidden in an earthen pot and buried under a pot of dung. The king returns and, seeing the animals, banishes the young queen to the menial position of scaring crows. Meanwhile, on the dung heap, two trees sprout: a mango tree (representing the boy) and a bush of chameli flowers, or jasmine creeper, in another translation (representing the girl). Sometime later, the king's sepoys see beautiful chameli flowers on the bush and try to pluck them, but, on the advice of the mango tree, the bush rises its height. The sepoys inform the old vizier, who comes to the dunghill to try and pluck the flowers, but the same thing happens. Next, the king himself comes to take the chameli flowers, but the tree rises even higher. Finally, the disgraced junior queen comes to the trees; they embrace the woman and ask her to be dug out of the dunghill. The twins are rescued from the dunghill, still alive; the king then restores the junior queen to her rightful place.

==== Oraon people ====
In a tale collected by linguist Ferdinand Hahn from an Oraon source in Chota Nagpur and translated to German with the title Die Zwillinge ("The Twins"), a king has seven wives. One day, the seventh wife gives birth to a boy and a girl, who are taken by the jealous co-queens and cast in a clay pit, while they replace them for a stone and a broom. A clay potter finds the children and raises them. Years later, he fashions a clay horse for the boy and a clay bird for the girl. The children play with their toys next to a pool where the co-queens are bathing and try to have their toys drink water. The co-queens tease the twins about their strange play, and they retort so is strange for a woman to give birth to a stone and a broom. The co-queens realize the children are their rival's twins, and, feigning illness, ask for their blood. The king then kills the children and buries them; from their graves, a vine sprouts with beautiful flowers. Some time later, the co-queens try to pluck the flowers, but the brother's voice tells his sister not to allow them to have the flowers, and the vine rises its height. Next, the king tries to pluck them, and this time the boy's voice tells his sister to allow it, since it is their father. With this, the children come out alive of the vine and sit on the king's lap.

In a tale from the Kurukh people collected by linguist Ferdinand Hahn with the Kurukh title Lūrhī dara Calkī, and translated by A. Grignard as Curry-roller and Broom, a king has seven queens and no son yet. However, the youngest queen becomes pregnant and gives birth to twins, a boy and a girl, whom the other co-queens replace for a broom and a curry-roller, then cast in a potter's pit. The king falls for the deception and mistreats the twins' mother so much she dies. As for the children, a potter rescues them from the pit and raises them. He also makes them a wooden horse for the boy and a wooden sparrow for the girl. They play pretend with the wooden animals in front of the co-queens who are bathing in a tank. The co-queens mock the twins' playtime, questioning how wooden animals would drink water, and the twins reply how can a woman give birth to a broom and a curry-roller. The co-queens realize the children are alive, feign illness and ask the king to drink their blood. The children are killed, and the potter buries them near the tank. From their grave a creeper with beautiful flowers sprouts. The co-queens try to pluck the flowers, but a voice in the wind warns the creeper about the co-queens and the flowers move up. Next, the king comes and the voice in the wind tells the twins not to fear the king. Thus, the twins come out of the grave alive and sit on the king's lap. The king reunites with his children and executes the co-queens.

==== Malto people ====
In a tale collected from a Malto source named Mesa Pahariya, in Ursa Pahar, and translated from Malto language to English as Story of abandoned children, a king is rich and has seven wives, but no child, and worries about who would bring him water in his old age. An ascetic comes to beg for alms and is given money or grains to eat when there is no food. One day, the king is too caught up in his dilemma when the ascetic makes a turn home. The king breaks off from his thoughts and addresses the ascetic, confinding in him his dilemma. The ascetic advises the king to find a mango in his garden, declare that he will have two sons, and throw a stone at a mango, then share it with his seven queens. It happens thus, and the king brings the fruit home. The six co-queens ask for the youngest to bring them some water, while they eat the entire mango, leaving only the stalk for her. The seventh queen returns and finds nothing of the mango for her. She goes to sweep the palace, finds the stalk and eats it, then becomes pregnant. The king goes on a hunt and gives his wife a drum of happiness and a drum of sadness. The six co-queens beat the drum of happiness, replace the twins for bricks and throw the babies in a potter's kiln. The co-queens trick the king that their colleague has given birth to bricks and does no work, so the monarch beats her up and banishes her. She lives in the flower garden. As for the children, the potters' couple finds them and adopts them, since they are childless. They raise the twins. When they are older, they ask this adoptive parents to fashion them some wooden horses, which they take to play pretend near the water and sing for the wooden horses to drink water. The six queens realize the twin boys are their rival's sons and plot to kill them: first, they give them some poisoned bread to eat, but the younger twin advises his elder brother to throw the food to a crow, which eats it and dies; next, the co-queens cook some jalebi laced with poison and give it to the twins, but the younger twin advises his elder to throw it to a dog, which eats it and dies. The younger twin bids them go to the water: they carry flowers and turn to two flowers near the water. The king's servants, who stand guard near the pond, see the flowers wriggling and hear a song about the crows drove their mother away. The servants notice the flowers' beauty and inform the king, since he would want to decorate the door to the palace with them. The king goes with the servants and sees the flowers, which begin to sing, calling him Raja Babu and repeating that the crows drove their mother to the flower garden. The king cries out that they are his sons; the flowers are restored to human form, and the boys jump on their father's lap. The king takes the twins home with him, and the younger prince reveals that the king wanted a son, so they were born, but he beat their mother, and the queens tried to kill them. The king then kills the six co-queens and buries them in the entrance hall, then brings back the twins' mother in a car from the flower garden, and lives with her and their twin sons.

==== Odisha ====
Author Praphulla Mohanti published a tale titled The Seven Sisters, which he sourced "from the coastal villages of Orissa". In this tale, a Brahmin lives in poverty with his wife and their seven daughters, and begs for alms for a living. One day, the Brahmin's wife prepares cakes for her and him, but their daughters eat the food. That same night, the Brahmin and his wife decide to abandon the girls in the forest since they can afford to support a family of nine. With an excuse to take the girls to their maternal uncle's house, the Brahmin takes them through the woods and gives each of them a bag of rice. After the girls are distracted, the man makes his way back home, and leaves the girls to their fates. Realizing they have been abandoned by their parents and that there isn't much food in the bags, the girls take refuge on a treetop. Some time later, a passing king feels a drop of water falling from the tree and look up; he notices the seven girls and orders them to climb down the tree. He inquires each about their skills: the first promises to feed the whole court with a pot of rice; the other that they can make delicious cakes and curry; finally, the seventh promises to bear "seven handsome sons and a beautiful daughter". The king chooses the seventh sister as his wife and marries her. When she is pregnant, he gives her a flute to blow if there is something she needs; on her sisters' goading, she blows on the flute many times, which irritates the king. She then gives birth to her promised eight children, whom are taken from her by her sisters and replaced for wooden dolls. The sisters bury the children in a dung heap, but they are found by a dog and taken to a lake where a Goddess of Waters live. The goddess raises the children and gives them wooden horses to play with. They then play before the king's gardener, trying to make them drink water, and the latter questions the purpose of their playtime, since a wooden being cannot drink. The children retort that so is a human woman giving birth to wooden images. Later, the Goddess of Water turns the boys into seven trees and the girl into a flower bush. The gardener, the king's minister and the king himself try to pluck their flowers, but the trees rise their branches out of their reach. Lastly, when the disgraced queen, banished to the stables, come to fetch the flowers. The trees approach the queen and the children come out of it. The king learns of his sisters-in-law's ruse and punishes them.

In a Orissan tale collected by folklorist Sohinder Singh Wanjara Bedi with the title A Jasmine Flower, a king has two co-queens, and, advised by astrologers, marries a third wife, a simple girl named Roopmati. Queen Roopmati becomes pregnant, to the king's delight and the jealousy of the other queens. In time, Roopmati is given a gong to ring to call the king. Roopmati is tricked by the co-queens into ringing the gong once and call the king, which greatly annoys him. The next time, she rings again and the king has the gong removed. The following day, she gives birth to a pair of twins, a boy and a girl. The co-queens bribe a midwife to take the children and replace them with kittens. The co-queens pretend to be shocked and lie to the king it signals an evil portent. The monarch then throws away the kittens and banishes Roopmati to the stables. As for the twins, they are lying in a heap of garbage, and their cries alert a passing sadhu. The sadhu rescues them and named them Amba (the boy) and Chamba (the girl). The co-queens learn of the children taken out of the garbage heap and decide to kill them: they bide their time four years later, when one day the sadhu leaves to collect food for them. They send the midwife with poisoned sweets, which she gives to the twins, who eat it and die. The sadhu returns and buries the children; from their graves, a mango tree sprouts bearing fruits (from the boy's) and a jasmine plant with flowers from the girl's. In time, the queens suspect the plants will reveal their deceit and try to pluck the flowers, but the jasmine asks the mango tree what she should do, and the mango tree answers she should shoot up to keep them unreachable. The co-queens surmise the trees are the children and ask the king to remove them. The soldiers try to uproot them, but both trees sink into the ground. The next time, the minister tries to pluck the flowers and fruits, but both trees keep shooting up. The king himself tries to uncover the truth of the trees, but the plants shoot up. However, they talk to each other that the king is their father, and ask him to bring the woman banished to the stables. The king does as requested and Roopmati is brought to the trees, which bend down in reverence to their mother. Roopmati recognizes the trees are her children, which say she can find them by pulling their roots. It happens thus and Amba and Chamba come out alive of the ground. The king banishes the co-queens and reinstate Roopmati.

In an Odisha tale from Mahipala titled "ଚକୁଳିଆ ପଣ୍ଡା" ("Chakulia Panda"), a Chakulia panda has a wife and seven daughters. The woman bakes cakes for her husband and the girls go to sleep. One by one, the girls wake up and eat the cakes. The wife realizes the trouble of her daughters eating the cakes, and her husband makes them dress for he will take them to their uncle's house. On the road, the girls rest for a while, while their father goes to look for water for them, but leaves a piece of his clothes to indicate if he is dead or alive if his garment is torn and bloody. Soon, the girls realize the piece of clothing is torn and bloody, fear their father has been devoured by a tiger and ask a tree to open up and let them inside the trunk for protection. One of the girls, the youngest, remains outside and climbs the treetop to hide. She cries, and her tears fall on a passing king. The king asks the girl her nature, and she says she is human, and her sisters are inside the tree. The other girls come out of the tree and the king inquires them about their skills. The girls offer their domestic skills, and the youngest promises to have the king as his wife. The king marries the youngest and she becomes pregnant, then he gives her a flute to call for him if she needs anything of him. The girl plays the flute at one time to test if he would come. The queen gives birth to seven boys, the youngest of the children, and a girl, the eldest, one day and plays the flute, but he does not come, so her sisters take the babies and toss them in the river in pots, then trick the king. The king banishes the queen to the stables, while the babies wash ashore in a garden, with the boys becoming arjun trees ("ଅର୍ଜୁନ ଗଛ", in the original) and the girl a patali flower ("ପାଟଳୀ", in the original). The king's gardener goes to pluck flowers and finds the new trees, then tries to pluck their flowers, but the trees begin to talk and ask their sister if they should allow the gardener to have the flowers, while their mother is at the stables, and the girl, as the flower, forbids them. The gardener goes to inform the king, who comes to the garden to hear the trees talking. The king then brings the disgraced queen; the trees notice their mother is there, and jump into her lap. The king learns the queen's sisters did this to the children and punishes them.

In an Indian tale from Western Odisha titled The childless queens, a king has seven queens that are barren, and he worries for the infighting between his co-wives, since the elder six mistreat the seventh. One day, a sadhu comes and the king confides in him about his childless problem. The sadhu gives him a mango seed in return, advising him to plant it in his garden and for the queens to water it and eat its fruit. The king follows the sadhu's instructions and a mango tree sprouts. The six queens leave the work for the seventh and eat the only fruit it yields, leaving no piece of it to the seventh. However, the seventh queen finds the discarded seed and the peels, and presses them to drink its juice. The elder queens think they will become pregnant, but only the seventh does, so while the king is busy elsewhere with the affairs of the kingdom, they give her nothing to eat or drink in order to starve her, to no avail. In time, the seventh queen gives birth to twins, a boy and a girl. The co-queens, feigning defference to their rival, place a broom and a grinding stone in their place, tie the babies in a sack and throw them in the water. The king falls for the ruse and the co-queens state she should be put to death, but the king spares her and asks her to leave the palace with the objects. The disgraced queen builds a hut near a pond and overhears a boy and a girl singing for her to bring them from the cold pond, where the young ones of the fishes, crocodiles and frogs are taking care of them. The queen dismisses the plea, saying that she has her children by her side (the objects). The same morning, the co-queens go to take a bath in the pond and spot a lotus and a lily floating in the water, so they try to pluck them. One by one, the co-queens fail in getting them, so they send passersby to get the flowers for them, to no avail. They return empty-handed to the palace and obsess over the flowers. The king notices their behaviour and goes to the pond to pluck the lotus and the lily. The monarch recognizes the flowers and tries to fetch them, but the flowers begin to sing to the king that, despite being their father, he lives with the "sinners". The king asks the flowers who are they, and the flowers answer with verses that they are the children of the mango, born of the disgraced queen, and thrown out by the other queens. The king sits by the edge of the ghat, while the disgraced queen goes to the other edge of the pond to wash her face, and the flowers sing to her, saying that they have not tasted their mother's milk. The seventh queen reaches into the water to pull the flowers and they turn into her twin children, who begin to suckle her breasts. The king sees the whole exchange and goes to meet his wife, asking to be forgiven for his mistake. He orders six sacks to be brought, where he ties the elder co-queens to toss them in the pond, and retakes the seventh queen and their twin children.

==== Goa ====
In a Goan tale, titled Seven Sons and a Daughter, a king is married, but has no heir. Thus, he marries other women in subsequent years, but his spouses are unable to bear children. One day, a princess from another kingdom announces that, if the king marries her, she will bear him seven sons and a daughter. The king agrees to her terms and marries her, to the elder six wives' jealousy. The king departs for business in another land, and leaves his seventh wife in the care of the other six spouses. Before he leaves, the seventh queen tells him that rain will mark a boys' birth, and a rain of pearls, a girl's. The king departs. When the time comes, the queen gives birth to her eight children, but the jealous co-wives cast the children into the dung pit and replace them and lie to the king she gave birth to seven dogs and a cat. Humiliated, the king orders the seventh queen to be cast in a pit, with only her head visible. Some time later, the six co-wives sight the children near the dung pit and hurriedly throw them in the well near the palace to finally kill them. However, the boys become a tall mango tree and the girl a plantain tree. The king's washerman goes to do his chores and sees the large leaves of the plantain tree, so he wants to use them as clothes hanger. He tries to cut off a leaf, but the tree moves its branch away from the washerman. Then, the plantain tree asks the mango tree if it can allow the washerman to have some of its leaves, but the mango tree says he cannot, until they see their mother's face. The washerman reports the strange occurrence to the king, and the monarch tries to pluck the leaf himself, but the situation repeats. He then sends for the six co-wives and the midwife, who also try to pluck the leaves, but the trees sing the same verses. The king then orders his seventh wife to be dug out of the pit and brought to the well. The trees recognize they have seen their mother, and lean forward on her shoulders. The king realizes the trees are his children, rubs his ring, washes it with water and sprinkles some drops on the trees to restore the children to human form. The family reunites, and the king executes the wicked co-wives and the midwife.

==== Magahi language ====
In an Indian tale in the Magahi language collected by Ramprasad Singh with the title "कउवाहँकनी रानी" ("Kauvahankani Rani"), a king has seven co-queens, but no child. One day, a sadhu advises him to take a stick and beat a mango tree to pluck seven mangoes which are to be given to his wives. It happens thus, and he gives the mangoes to the co-queens, who eat the seven mangoes. The youngest queen cannot eat a fruit, save for their leftovers, and is the only one to become pregnant, to the other queens' jealousy. The seventh queen is moved out to a hut, where she shoos away ravens, thus earning her the mocking name of Kauvahankani Rani. In time, she is ready to give birth, and the co-queens blindfold her: a pair of twins, a boy and a girl, are born, who are cast inside a potter's kiln and replaced for bricks and stones to fool the king. As for the children, the potter finds them inside the kiln and rescues them to raise, fashioning clay horses for them to play with. They take the horses to play in a lake near the king, bidding their horses to drink water. The king is puzzled at their play pretend, and they retort that equally strange is a queen giving birth to bricks and stones. Moved by the words, the king asks the potter about the children's origin, and learns they are his children. He takes them to the palace. However, the queens murder them and bury the pair. Where they are buried, a tree with fragrant flowers sprouts on the boy's grave and a jasmine plant on the girl's. The king wants the flowers and sends the gardener to pluck them, but the trees raise their branches. The co-queens try to pluck them also, but cannot. Finally, the Kauvahankani Rani goes to pluck them herself, and the trees lower their branches to allow her to pick the flowers. The king suspects something strange about the trees, and sends the gardener. The trees ask to be cut up gently: a twelve-year-old boy and girl come out alive. The king buries the co-queens alive and takes the Kauvahankani Rani and children back.

==== Assam ====
In a variant collected from elderly teller Lahari Hazarika, from Biragaon, Jorhat, with the title Atijar Raja Ranir Sadhu, translated as Tale of a King and Queen of the Past, a king has six queens, and takes a poor girl as his seventh wife. One day, the king has to depart, and gives the seventh queen a rang singa ('joy harp') and khong singa ('sorrow harp') for her to ring and call for the king if she needs anything. While he is away, the co-queens blindfold the queen, who is in the delivery of her children, and she gives birth to six boys and a girl. The co-queens order a soldier to take each child and kill them, but he only buries them in the forest, while the co-queens place a broom and kittens in the children's place, and ring the khong singa to summon the king. The monarch falls for the trick of the false births and banishes his seventh wife to be a cleaning lady. As for the children, the girl becomes a keteki flower, while the boys are buried in a box in the hole. A parrot flies in and tries to pluck the flower, when the girl asks her brothers if she should let the bird have it, but they deny it. The parrot flies to report to the king, who sends his ministers to investigate the matter. The ministers try to pluck the keteki flower, which the girl and her brothers deny them. The king comes with the eldest queen and she tries to pluck the flower, and still the girl, convinced by her brothers, denies her. The king then decides to bring in the seventh queen to the forest, by sending a palanquin to get her. The seventh queen refuses the palanquin and walks to the flower. When she goes to pluck it, the keteki flower tells her brothers their mother is there, and the boys allow their sister to give their mother the flower. The disgraced queen touches the keteki flower and it turns into her daughter, and they dig up the six princes from the hole. The king judges his elder co-queens and executes them, then retakes his seventh queen and their children.

==== Awadh ====
In an Indian tale from Awadh with the title Ketaki and Amola, a king is married to five queens, but still has no heir. One day, the fifth queen tells the king she is pregnant, and the four other co-queens fear that they will lose their position. One day, the king gives the pregnant queen a bell to ring if she needs anything, and she rings to test it. During labour, she rings the bell again, but the king does not appear, leaving her at the mercy of the co-queens: the eldest queen blindfolds her, and takes the younger queen's newborns, a pair of twins (a boy and a girl), and replace them for bricks and stones to trick her and the king. The king returns and falls for the trick, then orders the fifth queen to be paraded around town and have her face dirtied with soot, then banishes her to shoo away the crows. As for the children, the midwife places the twins in a potter's kiln to burn to death when the potter wakes up. Instead, the potter finds the children and discovers his wares are all shiny and clear. The potter and his wife rear the children and let them play with clay horses. One day, when the four co-queens are bathing in the river, the twins play with their clay horses, asking them to drink water. The queens notice the strange play pretend, and the boy replies so is a woman giving birth to bricks and stones. The co-queens realize the children are alive and lie to the king they were insulted by the brother-sister twin pair. The king sends for them and the boy explains they were simply playing and never meant to insult anyone. Still, the king has a pit dug and the twins thrown inside to be buried alive. From the pit, the boy becomes an Amola tree and the girl a Ketaki flower. People see the beautiful Ketaki flower and wish to pluck it, but the brother's voice in the tree asks his sister to leave the flower out of reach and into the sky. The king tries to pluck the flower himself, but the boy repeats his request to his sister, and the flower is again unreachable. Next, the co-queens try to pluck the flower, and again the flower becomes unreachable. Lastly, they bring in the Crow-chaser queen, the disgraced queen, whom the twins recognize as their own mother and the boy asks his sister to let their mother have the flower. The Crow-chaser woman gathers a handful of them and goes to the palace. The king notices the Ketaki flowers in the disgraced queen's hands and decides to investigate, so he orders the Amola tree to be dug up. When the men are doing it, a voice asks them to do it gently: under the tree, they find the twins alive and shining with "divine brilliance". The ministers and noblemen suggest they are the Crow-chaser queen's children, but he does not believe it at first, so they arrange a test: place a hot iron chest on each queen's breasts and if milk flows to the children's mouths, she will be declared their mother. The co-queens are summoned to perform the test and no milk emerges. When it is the Crow-chaser queen's turn, milk flows from her breasts and into the twins' mouths, thus proving their relationship. The disgraced queen retells the king how she rang the bell and he never came, how she was blindfolded by the others, and how they tried to kill the children. The king retakes the twins' mother as his queen and executes the other four by skinning them, stuffing them with straw and hanging them.

=== Nepal ===
In a Nepalese tale titled From the Mango Tree, a king has seven wives, but none have given birth to a son yet. He laments the fact to a sanyasi, a religious old man, who gives him a magic stick and advises him to beat it against a certain mango tree on a certain place, pluck the fruits that will fall and give them to his queens. The king beats the stick against the mango and gathers six mangoes. He brings the fruits home and gives them to his eldest queen, with a request to share the fruits with the other co-wives. The eldest queen summons five of their co-queens, save for the youngest and seventh, and the sextet eat the fruits, leaving nothing for the seventh queen, out of jealousy for the king's attention on her. The seventh queen learns of the king's quest, and goes to eat the mango pits and whatever was left of fruit. In time, the youngest queen becomes pregnant and gives birth to twins, a boy and a girl, whom the other queens throw through the window into some bushes and place a musli (a pestle) and a broom next to the queen. The king falls for the trick and reduces the seventh queen to being a servant to the others. As for the children, a poor water-carrier woman finds the twins in the bushes and takes them to raise. Years later, when the twins are playing next to a well, one of the other queens sights the pair and asks about their parentage. This motivates the twins to ask their adoptive mother, who reveals they are not her children. The queens learn the children are alive and conspire to eliminate them: they dig up a hole in the garden, shove the twins in and bury them. However, two trees sprout bearing blossoms. Later, each of the queens try to pluck a flower from the trees, but their branches move away. The youngest queen, now demoted from her position, goes one day to pluck the flowers to decorate her hair, and the tree lowers its branch, to the other queens' envy. The king lasly goes to pluck a flower himself and the tree lowers its branch for him. On seeing this, the elder queens try to steal it, but the branch is swings away. The king suspects something strange about how the trees act towards him and orders the gardeners to uproot the trees. The children are found alive in the tree roots and given to the king, who asks them who did this to them. The children retells the story of their life, from the old woman's kindness until the time where they were buried, barely surviving by breathing from the gaps between the treeroots. The king sends for the water-carrier to listen to her story, and gathers his councillors to identify the mother of the children. The councillors advise him to gather the young women of the kingdom in front of the children, and whoever cries is their mother. It happens thus, and many women are brought before the children, including the elder six co-queens, who do not shed any tear. Finally, the king learns the disgraced queen is in prison due to the six queens' orders and brings her before the twins, shedding tears for her own babies. The king force the queens to admit their misdeed and tries to execute them, but the disgraced queen begs him to take pity on them and he banishes the group.

== See also ==
- Saat Bhai Champa
- The Boys with the Golden Stars
- Champa Si Ton
