= Dakshinaranjan Mitra Majumder =

Indian Bengali writer (1877-1957)

- Born: 15 April 1877; Ulail, Savar, Dhaka, British India
- Died: 30 March 1957 (aged 79); Calcutta, India
- Occupations: Writer, editor, collector of folk literature, Zamindar
- Spouse: Giribala Debi
- Relatives: Ramadaranjan Mitra Majumdar (father); Kusumkumari Debi (mother); Rajlakkhi Debi (paternal aunt)
- Writing career
- Language: Bengali
- Genres: Folk Literature, Children's Literature
- Notable work: Thakurmar Jhuli (1907)

Dakshinaranjan Mitra Majumdar (15 April 1877 – 30 March 1957) was an Indian writer in Bengali of fairy tales and children's literature. He was born at Ulail in Dhaka district of Bengal province in British India (now Dhaka District of Bangladesh). His major contribution to Bengali literature was the collection and compilation of Bengali folk and fairy tales in four volumes – Thakurmar Jhuli (Grandmother's Bag of Tales), Thakurdadar Jhuli (Grandfather's Bag of Tales), Thandidir Thale (Maternal-Grandmother's Bag of Tales) and Dadamashayer Thale (Maternal-Grandfather's Bag of Tales).

== Early life ==
Dakshinaranjan Mitra Majumdar was born in the village of Ulail, near Savar in Dhaka district. He lost his mother when he was nine, and was brought up by his paternal aunt, Rajlakkhi Devi, in Mymensingh. Dakhshinaranjan recounts the memories of listening to fairytales told by his mother as well as his aunt, in his introduction to Thakurmar Jhuli. At the age of twenty-one, he moved to Murshidabad with his father. Education was not his strong suit, he had to change schools multiple times. However, his father's collection of books was a comfort to him. In Murshidabad, he began to write in different journals, including the Sahitya Parisat Patrika (mouthpiece of the Bangiya Sahitya Parishad) and Pradip. At 25, he published a collection of poems called Utthan (Ascent). On completing his F.A. degree, he returned to Mymensingh, and took over the task of overseeing his aunt's zamindari.

== Contribution to folk literature ==
Rabindranath Tagore notes in his introduction to Thakurmar Jhuli, that there was a dire need for folk literature of Bengal to be revived because the only such works available to the reading public of the time were European fairytales and their translations. He expressed the need for a swadeshi or indigenous folk literature that would remind the people of Bengal of their rich oral traditions. This would be a method of contending the cultural imperialism of the British. Dakhshinaranjan's aunt, Rajlakkhi Debi had given him the duty of visiting the villages in their zamindari. Dakhshinaranjan travelled and listened to Bengali folktales and fairytales being narrated by the village elders. He recorded this material with a phonograph that he carried, and listened to the recordings repeatedly, imbibing the style. Inspired by Dinesh Chandra Sen, he edited and published the material he had collected in Thakurmar Jhuli(1907), Thakurdadar Jhuli(1909), Thandidir Thale(1909), and Dadamashayer Thale(1913). He also translated fairytales from different parts of the world in the collection Prithibir Rupkotha (Fairytales of the World).

== Other contributions ==
Dakshinaranjan also edited a number of journals such as Sudha (1901–1904), Sarathi (1908) and Path (1930–1932). He was the mouthpiece of the Bengal Scientific Council of which he was vice-president from 1930 to 1933. As president of the Scientific Terminology Board of the Council he was able to contribute to the development of terminology.

== Death ==
He died of gastric ulcer in his Kolkata residence, on 30 March 1957.

== Works ==
- Thakurmar Jhuli (1907) - This anthology has attained iconic status in Bengali children's literature. In his introduction, Tagore noted that Dakhshinaranjan has successfully put into writing, the linguistic flavour of traditional oral tales. In 1907, Thakurmar Jhuli was published by the renowned publisher, Bhattacharya and Sons. Within a week, three thousand copies were sold. Several illustrations for the collection were also drawn by the author. His drawings were turned into lithographs for printing.
- Thakurdadar Jhuli (1909) - The tales in this collection are notable for their frequent use of song. The author notes in the introduction, that these were ritual tales, to be told and sung to pregnant women, or on the occasion of the completion of a religious vow or brata.
- Thandidir Thale (1909)
- Dadamashayer Thale (1913)
- Charu O Haru
- First Boy
- Last Boy
- Utpal O Rabi
- Banglar Bratakatha
- Sabuj Lekha
- Amar Desh
- Ashirbad O Ashirbani
- Manush Kishore
- Kishorder Man
- Banglar Sonar Chhele
- Bijnaner Rupkatha
- Natun Katha
- Rupak Katha
- Srishtir Swapna
- Chiradiner Rupkatha
- Amar Bai
- Karmer murti
- Sonar chala
