= Life's Secret =

Bengali folktale

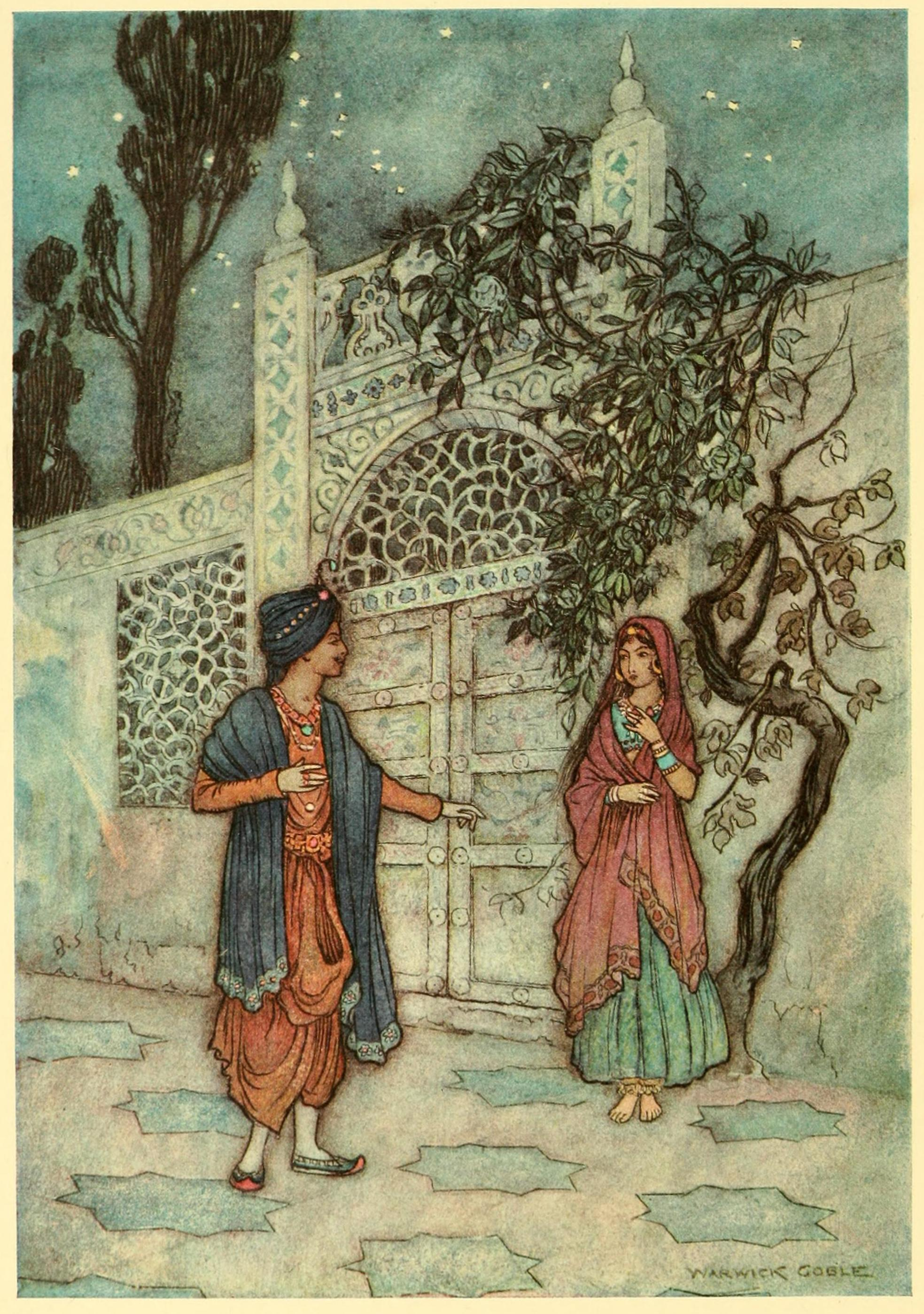
- A revived prince Dalim Kumar meets the maiden by the palace doors. Illustration by Warwick Goble for Folk-Tales of Bengal by Lal Behari Dey (1912).

Folk tale
- Name: Life's Secret
- Aarne–Thompson grouping: ATU 412, "The Maiden (Youth) with a Separable Soul in a Necklace"
- Region: Bengal; India
- Related: Princess Aubergine; A Dead Husband (Assamese folktale)

Life's Secret is a Bengali folktale collected by Lal Behari Day in his work Folk-Tales of Bengal. It concerns a prince whose lifeforce is tied to a necklace, and, as soon as it falls in the hands of his stepmother, he falls into a death-like sleep. With the help of a maiden predicted to marry "a dead husband", who is the seemingly dead prince, he recovers the necklace and unmasks his stepmother. Variants exist in India, both with a heroine and a hero whose life is attached to a magical necklace.

== Summary ==
In this tale, a king has two wives, Suo and Duo, both childless. One day, a fakeer goes to the palace to beg for alms, and is greeted by queen Suo, who gives him a handful of rice. In return, the fakeer gives her a nostrum, to be swallowed with the juice of a pomegranate flower; the queen will give birth to a son she will name Dalim Kumar ("Dalim" - pomegranate; "Kumar" - son). The fakeer also warns her that her son's life will be bound to a necklace of gold, inside a wooden box, inside a boal fish's heart that lives in a pool in the palace. In time, Suo gives birth to Dalim Kumar. The boy grows up and likes to play with pigeons. One day, a pigeon flies in Duo queen's quarters. Duo promises to return the pigeon if Dalim asks his mother the secret of this life. Dalim Kumar talks to his mother about it; at first, Suo refuses to tell her son about it, but eventually concedes and tells him about the necklace. Dalim Kumar tells his step-mother about it. Duo begins a plan: with some herbs, she feigns that her bones are so frail that they crackle and pop, and her only cure is the boal fish.

After the fish is caught, at the same time Dalim begins to feel unwell and, as the wooden box is open and Duo places Dalim's necklace around her neck, Dalim falls dead. The king's grief is so deep, and he orders his son's body to be placed in one of his garden-houses, with provisions, and trusts the son of his prime minister, Dalim Kumar's friend, with the keys to his tomb. Dalim Kumar wakes up at night while his step-mother does not wear the necklace, and dies in the daytime so long as Duo wears the necklace. After some time, the prime minister's son notices that, despite being dead, Dalim Kumar's body does not decay, and decides to investigate further. Dalim Kumar's friends discovers he is alive, and both plot to retrieve the necklace.

Meanwhile, Bidhata-Purusha's sister gives birth to a daughter, and Bidhata-Purusha prophesises his niece shall marry a dead bridegroom. After she comes of age, her mother takes the girl with her to avoid her fate, and they reach Dalim Kumar's garden-palace. The girl enters the palace and meets Dalim Kumar, who claims to be her future dead bridegroom. Dalim Kumar's friend marries them and leaves them be. The next day, Dalim Kumar "dies" again, to his wife's consternation, but revives at night. The girl learns of his condition and, after some years, and the birth of their two children, decides to meet her step-mother-in-law and retrieve her husband's necklace.

The girl disguises herself as a poor female barber and goes to Queen Duo's palace to hire herself. Unaware of the girl's identity, she takes her in as her servant. The girl instructs her elder son to play with the necklace around Duo's neck, and to cry if the boy parts with it. Duo lets the child play with the necklace, certain of her triumph. Dalim Kumar's wife steals the necklace and brings it back to her husband. Dalim Kumar, his friend and his family enter the king's palace with grandeur; the prince meets his parents and tells the whole truth. The king then sentences his queen Duo to be buried alive.

== Analysis ==
=== Tale type ===
The tale is classified in the international Aarne-Thompson-Uther Index as tale type ATU 412, "The Maiden (Youth) with a Separable Soul in a Necklace". Folklorist Stith Thompson included in the same tale type stories about a heroine and a hero whose soul lies in a magical necklace.

=== Motifs ===
The tale contains the motif E711.4, "Soul in necklace".

==== Fate's entity ====
The character of Bidhata is the personification of fate: he predetermines a person's fate from birth, by writing the individual's destiny on their forehead. He is also called Bidhātā Purush in Bengali language, and Vidhātā Purusha in Sanskrit, as well as Vidhātṛ, Dhātṛ, and Dhātā.

=== Interpretation ===
According to Marilyn Jurich, the tale follows the war between two female tricksters: Queen Duo, the king's younger wife, and Dalim Kumar's wife. Queen Duo tricks the prince into revealing his secret, steals the necklace, and has the upper hand for a time, when Dalim Kumar meets Bidhata's niece, whom he marries and who tricks queen Duo into delivering her the prince's life necklace. Another rivalry occurs between both queens: the king prefers the younger queen, Duo, until the elder, Suo, gives birth to a son, earning their co-husband's favour.

== Variants ==
=== Dalim-Koumar ===
In a Bengale tale collected by Tapanmohan Chatterji with the title Dalim-Koumar ou Le Prince Grenade, a king has two queens, Suo and Duo. Suo has a child, while Duo is childless, and envies the other. Suo's son is named Dalim-Koumar, since his life is tied to a pomegranate. One day, one of Dalim's doves flies to Duo's room and she catches it. Duo promises to return it, if the boy reveals where his "life" is. The boy retorts that his life is inside him, but the queen explains that an astrologer told the boy's mother the boy's life is inside the pomegranate, and Duo wants to know where it is. Dalim runs to his mother to ask her about it and, despite some avoidance, Suo tells him the secret. Dalim goes to tell Duo the information. Some time later, queen Duo feigns illness, and she tells the king her only cure is a certain pomegranate on a certain tree that lies away from the village. The king's servant takes the pomegranate from the tree, which instantly causes the boy to fall ill. Duo cracks open the fruit and finds a little box with a golden necklace inside. She wears it on her neck and Dalim falls dead immediately. The king and Suo cry for their lost son, and order his body to be placed inside a white marbled pavilion. Meanwhile, Dalim Kumar's fiancée, a princess, prepares herself for the sati, but promises to defeat death by the strength of her love and by giving offerings to the gods. The princess decides to vigil his body alone, in the pavilion. All the while, queen Suo retires to her chambers out of grief, and Duo becomes the king's favourite, being showered with affection and jewels, but, in order to avoid suspicions, takes off the necklace at night - which revives Dalim in his tomb. Thus, Dalim revives at night and dies in the morning. One day, Dalim Kumar awakes and sees the princess, his fiancée, in the pavilion, and they embrace. The prince tells the princess about the necklace, and she promises to fetch it and give it to him. After Dalim falls into a sleep again, the princess disguises herself as a barber woman and goes to queen Duo's palace. With a child in tandem, the princess convinces Duo to let the child play with the necklace. After fulfilling her task, the princess takes the necklace back to Dalim Kumar. He awakes and embraces his fiancée, thanking her for her help. The next day, Dalim Kumar and the princess enter his father's city to let him know his son is alive, and to punish the perfidious queen.

=== The Dead Prince ===
In a tale collected by Sunity Devi, Maharani of Coochbehar, with the title The Dead Prince, an astrologer has a sister. His sister gives birth to a girl and, after six days, asks her brother to predict her daughter's future - since, on the sixth day after birth, one's own future is written on their forehead by the Creator. The astrologer prophecizes that she will marry a dead man. Trying to avoid this fate, the girl's mother takes her daughter after she is 12 or 13 years old and wanders through a forest. Meanwhile, a Maharajah has two wives, a first Maharani with a son named Dalim Kumar, and a second Maharani, with no son. The second Maharani hates her step-son. One day, the prince is found dead, apparently he drowned while in the castle's grounds. The second Maharani suggests her husband burn the prince's body, but the boy's grieving mother asks her husband to build a palace to house the prince's body, with his instruments and provisions for 10 years. The Maharajah fulfills her request. Back to the girl and her mother, they are still wandering through forests and jungles, and the girl says she is thirsty. The girl stops to rest by a tree, while her mother goes in front of her to find any water source. They get separated: the mother thinks she lost her daughter and returns home, while the girl reaches the palace in the jungle. While she is there, one evening, the prince awakes and sees her. Days, months pass, and the girl and prince begin to like each other and marry. One day, the girl, now a woman, asks the prince his story. He tells that an astrologer predicted at the time of his birth his destiny as a great ruler, if he lived, and gave his father a necklace (which was "his life"), with a warning to not allow anyone wear it around their neck. So, to protect his son, the Maharajah places the necklace in a golden box and hid in the depths of a pool in the palace. However, the Maharajah's second wife, who also knew of the necklace, and ordered the fisherman to catch the fish that swallowed the golden box. The second Maharani stole the necklace and wore it around her neck - and it has been like this since then: whenever she wears the necklace in the morning, the prince dies, but come night, she takes off the necklace and the prince is alive. After hearing the story, the prince's wife, then, promises to get back the necklace. Some time later, some of the Maharajah's huntsmen and sportsmen report back to him that the prince's palace is haunted, since they hear a woman's voice and a baby's cry. The Maharajah ponders that, if his son was alive, he would have married and fathered a child at that time, but dismisses the huntsmen's concerns. Back to the prince's wife, she takes her child, disguises herself as a poor woman ("naptini") and goes to her father-in-law's palace to hire herself as a servant to the second Maharani. She has the Maharani play with her child, while she paints her feet, and the baby plays with the necklace. The prince's wife steals the necklace and rushes back to Dalim Kumar's palace to give him. Later, Dalim Kumar is visited by his father and mother, who rejoice that their son is alive. The prince suggests they throw the necklace to the depths of the ocean. Finally, the girl's mother learns of her daughter's survival and her story, and thanks her brother for his prediction.

=== Chundun Rajah ===
In a tale collected by author Mary Frere with the title Chundun Rajah, seven princes marry seven wives, who mistreat their sister-in-law, the princes' sister, except the seventh prince's wife. The women spread rumours about the princess until her brothers expel her from home. As a last humiliation, they shout at the princess to not return home until she marries Chundun Rajah ("King Sandlewood"), and when she does, to set wooden stools for them. The princess is given some food for the road, and finds a Rakshas's house. The Rakshas's pets, a little cat and a little dog, ask for some food and in returns let the princess take some of the Rakshas's antimony and saffron. Later, the princess finds a large tomb in the middle of the jungle, and enters it. The story then explains that the tomb belongs to Chundun Rajah: his family laid his body in the tomb, and, though many months have passed, his body has not decayed, because he comes alive at night and dies in the morning, and this only a Brahmin knows. One night, Chundun Rajah wakes up and sees the princess. They tell each other their stories. Chundun Rajah marries the princess with the blessing of his Brahmin friend, and, one day, explains the origin of his malaise to the princess: a flying peri fell in love with Chundun Rajah, but he refused her advances, and, in vengeance, the peri stole the Chundun Har ("sandlewood necklace") that stored the youth's life within. In time, the princess gives birth to a boy, but, due to worry for her husband's state, she begins to fall ill. Their Brahmin friends suggests she seeks shelter with her relatives-in-law (Chundun Rajah's mother and sister), and to sit on a marble slab in their garden, which was Chundun's favourite. The princess takes her son and goes to her mother-in-law's palace to sit on the marble slab. Chundun Rajah's sisters notice her presence and go to talk to her, and notice that the little boy was very reminiscent of their dead brother. They take the princess and her son and give her a house to live in. Days pass, and Chundun Rajah's sisters hear some voices coming from the princess's house, and pay her a visit: they see their brother, Chundun Rajah, alive and well, and playing with his son. After a joyous reunion, Chundun Rajah tells them of the peri and the necklace. Some time later, Chundun Kumar is playing with his son in his wife's house, and the flying peris come in unseen, even the one wearing his necklace. Chundun's son sees that specific peri and tears off the necklace from her neck, making its beads fall to the ground. The peris fly out of the house, while the princess gathers the beads, rebuilds the necklace and puts it on her husband's neck, ending his curse once and for all. Later, the princess invites her own brothers and their wives to her wedding to Chundun Rajah. Remembering her sisters-in-law's mocking remark, the princess has six of them sat on wooden stools, while the only one that was kind to her is given a better stool.

=== Pomegranate Prince ===
In an Orissan tale titled ଡ଼ାଳିମ୍ବକୁମର କଥା ("Story of Dalimbekumara" or "Tale of the Pomegranate Prince"), published by author Madhusudan Rao, a king has two wives and still no children. He does charitable works in hopes of being given a boon, when a wise man appears and gives the king a pomegranate, to be eaten by the queen that first enters her period. The younger queen enters her period and is given the pomegranate, causing her to become pregnant. The elder queen grows to despise her rival, and sends a snake to bite her. The snake warns the younger queen of the ploy, but, on calling the name of the wise man, no harm befalls her. Ten months later, the younger queen gives birth to a son they name Dalimbekumara or Pomegranate Prince. The wise man returns and warns the queen the boy's life lies inside a box, which is inside a Raghaba fish, a legendary creature, and that no one must find it, for the boy's sake. When the prince is six or seven, the elder queen tricks him to ask his mother about his life token in exchange for some parrots, and the prince tells his stepmother about the secret of life, hidden in the Raghaba fish. The elder queen feigns illness and convinces the king to drain the lake and fetch the fish for her. It happens thus, and the elder queen finds a necklace, which she wears around her neck. By doing this, the Pomegranate Prince falls dead. The king and the younger queen refuse to cremate him, so they build a palace in the forest with provisions and a flower garden and place his body there. However, the prince is actually alive, but dies when the elder queen puts on the necklace and revives when she removes it. Meanwhile, in another kingdom, a princess is sad for she cannot find a bridegroom, and the royal astrologers predict she is to marry a dead man that revives at night. The princess's father questions how they can find her a dead husband, so the astrologer suggests they abandon her in the forest. It happens thus, but the princess finds Pomegranate Prince's tomb and spends the day there. The prince wakes up and discovers the princess, telling her his lifestory. They fall in love and marry, and a son is born to them. When the boy is four years old, the princess disguises herself as a Bhandaruni and takes her child with her to her stepmother-in-law's palace. The princess pretends to be a nail clipper and asks the elder queen if her son can play with the necklace. The following day, the elder queen agrees to let the nail clipper's son play with the jewel, and both escape to the Pomegranate Prince's tomb to deliver him the necklace. Some time later, the Pomegranate Prince's father is alerted by the gardener about some commotion at the prince's tomb and goes to investigate. Once he enters the tomb, he finds the Pomegranate Prince back to life, with a princess and a baby boy next to him. The princess reveals to the king about the elder queen's ploy, and they return to the palace. The king digs up a pit to throw the elder queen inside and buries her with thorns, while the younger queen rejoices in her son's return. According to Odishan folklorist Kunja Behari Das, the Orissan tale of Pomegranate Boy is "borrowed from Sanskrit", and it is the "only example" of a human's life token in Orissan folktales.

=== Tale of Dalimbe Kumar ===
In an Odishan tale from Mahipala with the title ଡ଼ାଳିମ୍ବ କୁମର କଥା ("Tale of Dalimbe Kumar"), a king in a country has two queens, but neither have children. One day, a sannyasi comes to their palace and the elder queen goes to give him alms, then confides in him about their lack of heirs. The sannyasi gives the queen a pomegranate with a necklace inside, which he says will be the prince's soul and that it must protected from people's hands. In time, the elder queen gives birth to a boy named Dalimbe Kumar. The boy grows up and plays with some kites, one of which ends up in the younger queen's quarters. The younger queen promises to return the kite in exchange for Dalimbe Kumar finding out where his life is. He brings the necklace to the younger queen, who puts on her neck, causing the young prince to fall dead. The elder queen wants her son's body to be left in a house with provisions for him, which happens thus. Inside the house, Dalimbe Kumar dies during the day and comes alive at night, since the younger queen removes the necklace at night. Meanwhile, in another country, a raja lives with his daughter, the princess, when suddenly a voice booms from the sky with a prediction: the princess shall marry the one that dies during the day and lives by night. The raja expels his wife, the rani, and daughter, the princess, to the forest in a rage. The rani and the princess find the house of Dalimbe Kumar in the forest, and the princess enters it. She meets Dalimbe Kumar, who is alive at the moment, falls in love with him, and both have a son. One day, the princess asks Dalimbe Kumar about his condition, and he explains about everything. The princess then decides to retrieve the necklace for him, dons a barberwoman's disguise and takes her son to her in-laws' palace. She pretends to be a nail clipper and works on the younger queen's nails, when she notices the necklace and asks if her baby son can play with it. The younger queen allows it and gives the barber-woman the necklace. The boy tells his mother he will bring the necklace to his father, and hurries back to the house in the forest. Dalimbe Kumar wears his necklace and returns to life for good. Dalimbe Kumar's father hears news of a commotion in his son's house and goes to investigate: inside, he finds his newly revived son, a princess and a boy. The king learns everything about the younger queen's machinations, buries her alive in a hole, then retakes his son and his family to the palace.

== See also ==
- Kajalrekha (Bengali folk ballad)
- The Sleeping Prince (fairy tale)
- The Dead Prince and the Talking Doll
- Syair Bidasari
