= A Dead Husband =

Assamese folktale

Folk tale
- Name: A Dead Husband
- Aarne–Thompson grouping: ATU 412, "The Maiden (Youth) with a Separable Soul in a Necklace"
- Region: Assam, India
- Published in: Tales of Assam (1980); Folktales of India (1999)
- Related: Princess Aubergine; Life's Secret (Bengali folktale)

A Dead Husband is an Assamese folktale collected by Praphulladatta Goswami. It concerns a prince whose lifeforce is tied to a necklace, and, as soon as it falls in the hands of his stepmother, he falls into a death-like sleep. With the help of a maiden predicted to marry "a dead husband", who is the seemingly dead prince, he recovers the necklace and unmasks his stepmother. Variants exist in India, both with a heroine and a hero whose life is attached to a magical necklace.

== Sources ==
The tale was collected by author and scholar Praphulladatta Goswami from a fifty-year-old informant named Subhadra Goswami, a Brahmin woman from Nahir village, Kamrup District.

== Summary ==
In this tale, a man named Bidhata ("destiny") rules over fate. After his sister gives birth to a girl, Bidhata predicts that the girl shall have no want of food and drink, but she shall marry a dead husband. Trying to avoid this fate, Bidhata's sister takes her daughter and wanders off. They reach a large, uninhabited palace on the way, and the girl is impelled inside it, leaving her mother outside the palace door. Inside, the girl cries due to being separated from her mother, but, at night, a handsome youth appears to her. The youth assuages her fears, and tells her he will die in the morning. The girl becomes a woman, and lives with the youth.

One day, the youth explains he is a prince; his mother placed a necklace on his neck; after his mother died, his father remarried, and his new step-mother hated the prince and stole his necklace, causing him to fall into a death-like sleep immediately. The prince's step-mother placed the necklace in a water jug, and he wishes someone can retrieve the necklace. The prince's wife takes their child and goes to her father-in-law's palace to steal the necklace. She enters service as a maid, and wins the queen's trust. After some time, she takes back the necklace and rushes back to her husband in the jungle palace. The girl drops the necklace in a pot of water and revives the prince.

The prince goes back to his father and tells him the whole story. The king executes his wife, and welcomes his son and daughter-in-law.

== Analysis ==
=== Tale type ===
The tale is classified in the international Aarne-Thompson-Uther Index as tale type ATU 412, "The Maiden (Youth) with a Separable Soul in a Necklace". Folklorist Stith Thompson included in the same tale type stories about a heroine and a hero whose soul lies in a magical necklace.

=== Motifs ===
The tale contains the motif E711.4, "Soul in necklace".

==== Fate's entity ====
The character of Bidhata is the personification of fate: he predetermines a person's fate from birth, by writing the individual's destiny on their forehead. He is also called Bidhātā Purush in Bengali language, and Vidhātā Purusha in Sanskrit, as well as Vidhātṛ, Dhātṛ, and Dhātā.

== Variants ==
=== Dalim Konwar ===
In a tale collected from a seventy-year-old teller from Chamarkuchi with the title Dalim Konwar ("Pomegranate Prince"), a king and his two wives are childless. One day, a beggar appears with an offer to fulfill the monarch's wishes for a son: he recites a mantra over a pomegranate and gives it to the king, which is to be shared between both co-wives. The elder wife eats the whole fruit and leaves the peels to the younger one. Only the younger queen becomes pregnant and gives birth to a son they name Dalim Konwar. Prince Dalim Konwar is always immobile, as if he is asleep or dead. The beggar returns and gives a chain to the boy, explaining it must be places in water for the boy to live, otherwise he will fall dead. The elder queen discovers the prince's secret and steals the chain, causing him to appear as if dead. The king believes his son has died and places him inside a palace. Meanwhile, an astrologer predicts his elder daughter will marry a dead man. The astrologer's wife tries to defer this fate for her daughters and escapes with them to the forest. Under heavy rain, they take shelter inside a palace and discover the sleeping prince. The elder daughter enters the palace and it locks behind her, trapping her inside and thus fulfilling the astrologer's prediction. The girl finds the prince awake and both marry. In time, the girl gives birth to a son and later goes to find work in her stepmother-in-law's palace. The baby boy cries to play with the golden chain that the queen has around her neck, and the woman gives it to the boy to calm him. The following day, the queen gives the baby the golden chain, and the girl escapes with the object back to Dalim Konwar's palace, placing it in a lota full of water. Dalim Konwar is restored to life and takes his wife and son to meet his father. The king learns of the elder queen's treachery and punishes her.

=== Abanti Konwar ===
In a tale titled Abanti Konwar, Avantikonwar or Avanti Konwar, originally collected by author Atul Chandra Hazarika, a king and his co-queens are childless, but he favours the younger one over the elder one. Being a devotee of god Shiva (or Mahadeva), the elder wife is visited by the god with news of her future pregnancy and a golden chain (or necklace). In time, the elder wife gives birth to a prince, who becomes his father's favourite. The elder queen places the necklace on the boy during the day and removes it at night, placing it in a water pitcher for safekeeping. The Konwar's mother dies when he is sixteen, and his stepmother, the co-queen, sets his sights in eliminating the boy. With a maid's help, she discovers the secret of the golden chain: Konwar wears it during the day and places it safely inside a Ghagri, a water brass pot; without it, he would die. The co-queen steals the golden chain when the prince is asleep and causes him to enter a comatose state as if he is dead. The king goes mad with grief, builds a mausoleum for him in the forest and covers it with greenery, turning it into Abanti Nagar (or Avanti Nagar, in another translation). The prince becomes known as "Avanti Konwar".

Meanwhile, Bidhata's wife gives birth to a girl, and Bidhata declares his daughter's fate, written on her forehead: she is to marry the dead man at Abanti Nagar. Bidhata's wife, Sabitri, tries to avoid this fate for their daughter, and flees from their home. Sabitri and her daughter venture into a forest, eventually finding the forest mausoleum and leading to the fulfillment of the prophecy: they take shelter in Abanti Nagar during a harsh storm, and the girl finds herself trapped inside, and discovers the prince asleep on a bed of gold. At night, the dead man, Konwar, wakes up and meets the newcomer girl. They fall in love with each other and settle into a routine, with him remaining in a dead state during the day and alive at night. The girl gives birth to a son. Some time later, the girl learns of her husband's chain that his stepmother keeps around her neck and pays a visit to her palace under the guise of a barber for the queen, trimming her nails and giving her massages. Avanti Konwar's wife earns the queen's trust, and one day nudges her son to ask to play with the necklace around the queen's neck. The queen falls for the trick and gives the barber's son the chain. The barber takes the golden chain back to Abanti Nagar and gives it to her husband. Konwar is restored to life and meets his father, taking his wife and son with him. Avanti Konwar reveals the whole story to his father and forgives his stepmother.

=== What is Fated to Be ===
In an Assamese tale titled What is Fated to Be, a king has two queens, but no child. The younger queen worships Mahadeva. Pleased with her devotion, the deity approaches her. The queen prays to Mahadeva to grant her a child, but he says it is not her fate. After some insistence on her part, Mahadeva gives her a string of beads, telling her to place it in water. The queen is happy for her boon, tosses the beads in a tank, and gives birth to a son. The king is happy for his son, raises him and arranges for his marriage when he comes of age. Years later, the elder queen learns of the prince's secret of life asks the king to catch some fishes in the palace's tank, then to show her every fish that is caught. The elder queen finds the fish that swallowed the string of beads, cuts it open and places the beads around her neck, causing the prince to die on the day before his wedding. The king and the younger queen are stricken with grief, and the monarch orders for a house to be built in the middle of the forest and furnished with food and other amenities. The prince's stepmother wears the beads at night and places it in a pitcher during the morning, causing the prince to fall into a death-like sleep at night and become alive in the morning.

Meanwhile, Bidhata, the god of fate, has a daughter with his wife. On her probing, he predicts his daughter's fate: she will marry into a royal family, but her husband will be a dead man. Bidhata's daughter becomes a beautiful young woman, and her mother goes to look into her fate: she discovers her daughter will marry a dead husband. Displeased that her husband Bidhata allots good marriages for others and not their own daughter, the woman confronts Bidhata about it, and he resigns that he only reads what is written on her forehead. She takes their daughter and leaves for the forest, avoiding animal dangers. Eventually, they reach a walled house. Bidhata's daughter enters the gate and is locked inside, leaving her mother outside. The woman asks her daughter to investigate the building, and finds the prince, alive at this time. They introduce themselves to each other, when the prince falls dead by nighttime. Bidhata's daughter vigils the prince at night, who wakes up in the morning. Both live as husband and wife, have a son, and fall into a routine. One day, Bidhata's daughter and the prince discuss about the beads around his stepmother's necklace, and she decides to retrieve it. She leaves for her father-in-law's palace with her child and hires herself. The maiden convinces the king to take after her son, whose relationship she does not divulge, and nudges her son to ask the queen for the beads to play with. It happens thus, and Bidhata's daughter takes it and throws it in a tank, then reveals to the king the baby is his grandson, and the prince is alive in the forest. The king reunites with the prince and punishes the elder wife.

=== The Woman Who Married a Dead Man ===
In a tale titled The Woman Who Married a Dead Man, sourced from Assam, Bidhata's sister gives birth to a daughter and predicts her fate: the girl shall want for nothing, but shall marry a dead man. Bidhata's sister takes her daughter and flees, wanting to escape this turn of fate. She ventures into the jungle, when her daughter complains she is thirsty. The duo find a palace in the jungle and go there to find provisions. Maya, the girl, enters the palace and is locked inside it. Maya's mother tries to release her daughter, to no avail, so she tries to look for help. Back to Maya, she cries herself to sleep. when she wakes up, she finds a young man next to her, called Jaya, who dines with her. Jaya and Maya talk to each other, and Maya begins to fall in love with him. Jaya also explains he wakes up at night, but dies by the sunrise, so maya should not fear anything, for he revives at night. They fall into a routine, with Maya asking Jaya about the reason he is that alive and dead state, but he refuses to divulge, opting to talk instead about his home and family.

Five years later, Maya is now a young woman, and convinces Jaya to marry her, since both their families think they are dead. It happens thus. Maya then presses Jaya for explanations, since she is now his wife, and he relents: he is a prince, and a court astrologer predicted a dire fate for him; thus, his mother, the queen, prayed fervently, and the Goddess came to give the queen a necklace which was to put around the prince's neck; after the queen died, the king took another wife, and the new queen stole his necklace, causing him to fall dead; the king placed the prince's body in the palace with food and drinks, and he goes through a cycle of living and dying when the queen puts on and removes the necklace. Maya then thinks about retrieving the object to save Jaya. Years pass, and she has a baby girl.

One day, Maya tries to open the locked door of the palace and finds herself outside with her daughter in her arms, her husband still locked in. Maya goes to her stepmother-in-law's palace to look for a job, and works in the kitchen. Maya notices the necklace around the queen's neck, and one day is called to comb her hair. Maya pinches her daughter to make her cry and lies to the queen the girl wants to play with the necklace. The queen gives the bracelet first. In time, Maya gains the queen's trust and is given the necklace for her daughter to play with. Maya takes the necklace when the queen is asleep and rushes to the jungle palace with her daughter. The queen wakes up, realizes the necklace is gone and orders her soldiers to go after Maya. In the jungle palace, Maya places the necklace around Jaya's neck and he revives. They don some dresses and clothes, take some jewels an escape through a secret passage to reach Jaya's father's kingdom. At the kingdom, the couple draw the people's attention, and are brought to the king's presence. Jaya reunites with his father and introduces his wife Maya and their daughter. The king banishes his second wife to the palace jungle with provisions for her, and locks her inside. Jaya's father invites Maya's mother and uncle to their children's marriage celebration. During the ceremony, Bidhata tells his sister that Maya would have nothing to worry about, just as he predicted.

== See also ==
- Kajalrekha (Bengali folk ballad)
- Life's Secret (Bengali folktale)
- The Sleeping Prince (fairy tale)
- The Dead Prince and the Talking Doll
- Syair Bidasari
