= Kajalrekha (Bengali folk ballad) =

Heroine from a Bengali folk ballad

Kajalrekha (Bengali: কাজলরেখা) is a Bengali folk ballad collected in the work Maimansingha Gitika, containing ballads from Mymensingh, Bengal. It tells the story of a girl that is destined to marry a seemingly dead man, who is, in reality, under a curse, his body prickled by numerous needles. The girl begins a task of removing the needles to revive the prince, but a servant replaces her and claims the prince's resurrection as her doing. Finally, after some misandventures, a bird reveals Kajalrekha's story to a gathering of people, which alerts the prince of the truth.

The tale is classified in the international Aarne-Thompson-Uther Index as tale type ATU 894, "The Ghoulish Schoolmaster and the Stone of Pity", for the alternate object the heroine may tell her tale to, but, before the 2004 revision, it was indexed as type AaTh 437, "The Needle Prince".

== Publication ==
The story was also translated to Russian with the title "Каджалрекха" ("Kadjalrekha").

== Summary ==
A rich merchant named Dhaneswar has a daughter named Kajalrekha and a son named Ratnaswar. In time, the man gambles away his wealth, and he cannot find a suitable groom for his daughter when she reaches marriageable age. One day, a sannyasi (sage) comes and brings a ring-finger and a Suka, a bird the sage calls Dharma-mati, and both will provide the means to regain his fortune. The Suka guides the merchant in regaining his fortune by selling the ring and hiring some artisans. Later, as the girl approaches her 12th year, the Suka bird tells the merchant Kajalrekha's fate is to marry a dead husband, and convinces him to abandon her in the forest.

The merchant takes his daughter to the forest to leave her there, but she realizes the truth of her situation. The pair stop to rest on the staircases of a dilapidated temple, and they go to search for water. Kajolrekha enters the temple, which locks behind her. The girl finds the body of a dead prince pierced by needles and arrows, and talks to her father about her destiny. The merchant resigns to his daughter's fate and returns home. Kajalrekha laments for the dead prince.

The sannyasi enters the temple and tells Kajalrekha the dead prince is her husband, and her role is to remove the needles from her body, but she must leave the last needles over his eyes for last and not discern her identity to him. He also gives her some leaves for her to apply their juices on him. After seven days removing the needles, she leaves the temple on the eighth day and goes to a ghat to take a bath. A man announces a young teenage servant whom she buys and names Kankan-dashi ("Maid of the Bracelet"). She brings the servant with her to the temple. The Maid of the Bracelet wakes the prince instead of Kajalrekha, and says Kajalrekha is but her maid who she purchased. The prince brings the false bride and the servant to his palace, where the servant, acting as the queen, orders Kajalrekha around, but the prince begins to take a liking to her due to her modesty and manners. One day, the prince says he is going on a journey and asks which presents he can bring both maidens: the servant asks for jewels, while Kajalrekha asks for the Dharma-mati bird. The prince, whom the text calls Needle Prince, journeys to Kajalrekha's father's house and buys from him the bird.

Meanwhile, at the prince's kingdom, the ministers decide to put the false queen and Kajalrekha to the test: first, Kajalrekha and the false queen are to cook dishes for the guests, and Kajalrekha cooks better food and makes a presentable dish for guests with rice and lemon. Secondly, they are to decorate the patio for the night of the Lakshmipuja festival, by doing alipana paintings; Kajalrekha paints beautiful pictures with rice flour, which leads to the ministers to suspect the girl is of higher breeding. At last, the Needle Prince returns with the Dharma-mati bird and gifts it to Kajalrekha. The girl confides with the bird her problems, and the bird consoles her with tales from her father's lands. However, the false queen makes up rumours about Kajalrekha and brings the case to court. Kajalrekha sustains her innocence and asks for the bird Dharma-mati to be brought as her witness. The bird says nothing in her defence, save to banish her to the forest. Kajalrekha is banished from the kingdom and takes a ship. A friend of the Needle Prince, another prince, offers to marry her, and she finally tells her lifestory. The second prince departs with her on a ship, but the ship stalls at sea and they abandon her on an island, believing her to be cursed.

Eventually, her brother Ratneswar, now a merchant, rescues her on his ship and brings her back home intent on marrying her, due to not recognizing her. Kajalrekha agrees to a marriage, but asks for the Dharma-mati bird (a parrot) to be brought to the wedding to reveal her origin and caste. Back to the Needle Prince, he becomes obsessed with finding the girl he believes to be a servant, to no avail, until he hears the drums announcing the marriage of Ratneswar and the bird from the forest being brought to the ceremony. The Needle Prince attends the celebration with the bird, which perches on a stool and relates Kajalrekha's tale. Then, he recalls the origins of the Needle Prince: how his merchant prince father, Hiradhar, could not have children, until a sannyasi appeared and gave the couple a mango to cure the queen's barrenness; the queen, however, gave birth to a dead son, which the sannyasi said was to be pierced with needles and placed in a temple, for the gods allowed him to grow to youth. The bird finishes his tale by relating how Kajalrekha restored the Needle Prince to life, was replaced by the servant and is about to marry her own brother. With this, the Dharma-mati bird vanishes, Ratneswar apologizes to his sister, the Needle Prince marries Kajalrekha and punishes the Maid of the Bracelet by burying her alive.

== Analysis ==
=== Origin ===
The folk ballad is dated to the seventeenth century. Bengali folklorist Ashraf Siddiqui considered that its contents resembled a folktale from the international Cinderella tale type. Similarly, in his introduction to the story, Dinesh Chandra Sen referred to it as a "folk-tale," and stated it was written in the dialect of the eastern parts of Mymensingh.

=== Tale type ===
The tale is classified in the international Aarne-Thompson-Uther Index as tale type AaTh 437, "The Supplanted Bride (The Needle Prince)": the heroine is prophesied to marry a dead man, enters a castle and finds a prince on a slab as if he is dead. Alternatively, the heroine must remove the pins from his sleeping body, or hold a long vigil on him for forty days; the heroine tires on the second-to-last day and hires a servant to cover for her, who supplants her as the prince's saviour; next, the prince goes to the market and brings back three objects on the heroine's request, to which the heroine reveals the servant's deceit and through which the prince learns the whole truth.

The tale type is also closely related to AaTh 425G, "False Bride Takes Heroine’s Place". However, the last major revision of the International Folktale Classification Index, published in 2004 by German folklorist Hans-Jörg Uther, subsumed tale type AaTh 437 as new type ATU 894, "The Ogre Schoolmaster and the Stone of Pity".

=== Motifs ===
According to Sen, the heroine's name, Kajalrekha, literally means "streak of the black paint collyrium".

In regards to a similar Bengali tale, Indologist Heinz Mode and Arun Ray noted that the cooking test (preparing dishes with rice) and the painting test (making ceremonial Alpona paintings with rice), done by the heroine and the false queen, reveal the "local Bengali character" of the story, since both traditions are cultivated in Bengal as part of the female milieu.

==== The heroine's role ====
According to Enzyklopädie des Märchens, type 437, "The Needle Prince", is thus called for the task the heroine must undertake in Indian, Persian and Tajik variants: remove the pins or needles from the prince's body.

The heroine is also considered to be more active, since the prince is the one who is in a passive state, and discovers the truth by heroine's actions, who asks for the objects she will reveal the tale to.

==== The heroine's confidante ====
The heroine may tell her sorrows to the stone of patience, which is replaced by a doll or a "patience box" in other tales. The stone of patience serves to reveal the truth, since another person eavesdrops on the heroine's confession. In some tales, the heroine's suffering is so strong, the stone explodes or melts.

== Adaptation ==
The story of the ballad was adapted to a 2024 Bengali language film titled Kajolrekha.

== See also ==
- A Dead Husband (Assamese folktale)
- The Dead Prince and the Talking Doll (Indian tale)
- Pentamerone
- The Lord of Lorn and the False Steward
- The Goose Girl
- The Young Slave
- The Maiden with the Rose on her Forehead
- The Bay-Tree Maiden
- Sleeping Beauty
- The Sleeping Prince (fairy tale)
- Life's Secret (Bengali folktale)
