= Maroula =

Greek fairy tale

Maroula is a Greek fairy tale collected by Georgios A. Megas in Folktales of Greece.

Andrew Lang included a variant, The Sunchild, in The Grey Fairy Book, without listing any source information.

== Synopsis ==
A childless woman tells the Sun that if she could only have a child, the Sun could take the child when she was twelve. Then she has a daughter, Maroula or Letiko. When Maroula is twelve, a fine gentlemen meets her while she is gathering herbs and tells her to remind her mother of her promise.

In Megas's variant, this happens twice; the first, the mother instructs Maroula to tell the Sun that she forgot; the second, the Sun has her put an apple in her headdress to remind her by falling out in the evening; the mother keeps her a long time, and finally sends her again, and the Sun returns, so she tells Maroula to tell the Sun that he may take "it" when he finds it, and so he takes Maroula.

In Lang's variant, her mother stops up the house to keep all sunlight out, but she leaves open a key hole, and when the light falls on Letiko, she vanishes.

In both variants, she is miserable in the Sun's house and makes up excuses.

In Megas's, she scratches her own cheeks and blames, in turn, a cockerel, a cat, and a rose bush for scratching her.

In Lang's, she is sent after straw; she sits in the shed and laments being taken from her mother; when she returns, she claims her shoes were too large and slowed her, so the Sunball shrinks them. The same thing happens when she is sent for water, except that she says her petticoat was too long; and then when she is sent for slippers, and says her hood blocked her sight.

Finally, the Sun realized she is unhappy and decided to send her home. He summons animals to ask whether they would take her home, and then what they would eat on the way. In Megas's variant, both lions and foxes say they will eat Maroula; only foxes say the same in Lang's. Then he asked two hares in Lang's version and two deer in Megas's, and they would eat grass and drink from streams. They set out. When they became hungry, the animals told her to climb a tree while they ate.

In Megas's version, a lamia sent her three daughters to get water from the well; each one saw Maroula's reflection in the well, took it for her own, and decided she was too pretty to fetch water. The lamia herself came and realized what it was. She complained that Maroula had made her leave her bread she was making, and Maroula kept sending her back to finish it before she ate her.

In Lang's version, a lamia just came. She tried to lure her down by comparing their shoes, but Letiko said hers were finer, and when the lamia said her house needed sweeping, Letiko told her to sweep it and come back. When she did, the lamia compared their aprons, and then tried to cut down the tree to eat her, but she could not cut it down. Then she tried to lure her down because she had to feed her children, but Letiko told her to go and do it, and when she left, Letiko summoned the hares and they fled.

The lamia chased after them. They passed a field and the lamia asked if they had seen anyone; they answered only that they were planting beans. Or, they passed a mouse that gave answers about what it had been doing, not what it saw, until several questions in.

As she approached home, the dog, the cat, and the rooster each announced her return, and her mother told them to be quiet before her heart broke with grief, but Letiko returned. The lamia was so close that she took part of one of the hare/deer's tails, but nothing more. The mother, delighted, silvered its tail for bringing Letiko back to her.

== Analysis ==
The tale is classified in the international tale type index (henceforth, AaTh) as type AaTh 898, "Daughter to be Given to the Sun when Twelve". After folklorist Hans-Jörg Uther's 2004 revision of the index, the type was renamed ATU 898, "The Daughter of the Sun".

Professor Michael Merakles listed 40 Greek variants of tale type 898.

Commenting on a Sicilian variant collected by Laura Gonzenbach, scholar Jack Zipes supposed that the tale originated in Middle East. Further scholarship points out that the tale type is "widespread" in Mediterranean countries. Author Italo Calvino, for instance, noted its presence in Italy, Spain and Greece.

=== Variants ===
Lang's original source was Vom Sonnenkinde ("About the Sun-Child"), collected from Epiros by Austrian consul Johann Georg von Hahn. Von Hahn also provided a variant from Kato Sudena, wherein the girl is named Iliodara (᾽Ηλιοντάρα).

Zipes also lists a variant from Gonzenbach ("Von der Tochter der Sonne"), one by Giuseppe Pitre ("La Fata muta") and another by Domenico Comparetti ("Il Palazzo incantato").

Lucy Garnett published an Albanian tale titled The Maiden who was Promised to the Sun, wherein a childless queen prays to the Sun to give her one daughter, and the Sun agrees, with the condition that she relinquishes the girl to him when she is of age. It does happen and the girl is taken to the Sun. At the Sun's abode, there lives a Koutchedra (kulshedra) that hungers to devour the maiden. She escapes with the help of a stag and returns home. The second part of the tale follows the episode of the princess holding a vigil on a cursed prince, a slave replacing her, and the heroine confessing her story to an object named "stone of patience".

== See also ==
- Prezzemolina
