= The Dead Prince and the Talking Doll =

Indian folk tale

The Dead Prince and the Talking Doll is an Indian folktale collected by scholar A. K. Ramanujan in Kannada. It tells the story of a princess destined to marry a seemingly dead man, who is, in reality, under a curse, his body prickled by numerous pins. The princess begins a task of removing the pins to revive the prince, but a servant replaces her and claims the prince's resurrection as her doing. Finally, the princess is given a talking doll she reveals her story to, which alerts the prince of the truth.

The tale is classified in the international Aarne-Thompson-Uther Index as tale type ATU 894, "The Ghoulish Schoolmaster and the Stone of Pity", for the alternate object the heroine may tell her tale to, but, before the 2004 revision, it was indexed as type AaTh 437, "The Needle Prince". Variants of the type are reported in India.

== Summary ==
A princess is visited by a beggar man (bava) who comes for alms and predicts she will marry a dead man. One day, the king overhears the beggar man's prophecy and asks his daughter the meaning of the man's words. The princess explains the beggar man has visited her for the past twelve years and has always uttered this prophecy to her, since she was a little girl. The king decides to avert this fate for his daughter and departs from the kingdom with the whole family.

Meanwhile, the story takes a turn to explain how a prince from a neighbouring kingdom fell deathly ill and seemed to die, but his body looked as if it was in a state of sleep. Astrologers divined that he would be that way for twelve years, and the king places his son's body in a bungalow outside his kingdom, only to be accessed by his destined bride. Before the king exits the improvised mausoleum, he writes a warning that only a chaste woman who has made offerings to the gods for her husband can enter the door to the bungalow, only her and nobody else.

The action returns to the first king and his family: they stop by the forest to cook a meal, while the princess goes for a walk and finds the bungalow. She touches the door and it lets her in, locking her inside. The princess wanders through the bungalow's twelve door and discovers the body of the prince. She realizes the beggar man's words have become true, and finds provisions the prince's family have left for twelve years. The princess then decides to stay there and take care of the prince's body. In the forest, the princess's family notices the girl is missing and go to look for her. Her father finds the house and hears his daughter's cries coming from the bungalow, then asks how she entered it. The princess explains the door opened for her, but they locked her in and she cannot leave, then mentions the dead man's body. Her father then concedes that this is the princess's destiny, and leaves her to her fate.

The princess holds a long, 12 year vigil on him, bathing the body and making offerings for the gods. In the tenth year, the princess feels lonely and longs for a female companion, when an acrobat girl appears outside the bungalow. She contorts herself and enters the building. The princess rejoices she has a companionship to endure the end of the vigil. After two more years, the princess hears a bird chirp outside, saying that the time of the vigil is at an end and the girl should take the leaves from a certain tree, make a juice out of it and give it to the prince in a silver cup. The princess follows the bird's instructions and prepares the concoction to awaken the prince, but goes for a bath before she does it. The acrobat girl sees the concoction and asks the princess what it means. The princess tells the acrobat girl what the bird said and goes to take a bath. While she is busy, the acrobat girl takes the potion and pours down the prince's mouth. The prince wakes up uttering Siva's name, and sees the acrobat girl, who introduces herself as his wife.

The princess returns and finds the prince, now revived, and the girl in private conversation, then relents that happiness is not for her. Later, the prince begins to notice differences between the girl who claims to be his wife and the one that acts as their servant, and suspects something is amiss. Later, he decides to go on a hunt, and asks the two girls what he can bring them: the acrobat girl asks for dry bread (which alerts the prince of her true character) and the princess asks for a talking doll. The prince returns with the gifts, and that night the talking doll asks the princess to tell her a story. The princess recounts everything that happened to her, including how the acrobat took the silver cup. The prince overhears the whole story, whips the acrobat girl with a switch to expel her, and goes to meet the princess, his true saviour. Outside, the prince's family, who has waited twelve long years for his revival, finds the couple inside, the prince back to life and with his loving princess. The prince's family sends for the princess's family, who go to their daughter's wedding.

== Analysis ==
=== Tale type ===
The tale is classified in the international Aarne-Thompson-Uther Index as tale type AaTh 437, "The Supplanted Bride (The Needle Prince)": the heroine is prophesied to marry a dead man, enters a castle and finds a prince on a slab as if he is dead. Alternatively, the heroine must remove the pins from his sleeping body, or hold a long vigil on him for forty days; the heroine tires on the second-to-last day and hires a servant to cover for her, who supplants her as the prince's saviour; next, the prince goes to the market and brings back three objects on the heroine's request, to which the heroine reveals the servant's deceit and through which the prince learns the whole truth.

Similarly, Kannada scholarship abstracted a similar tale type from Karnataka, also indexed as 437 ("೪೩೭", in the original): a princess is prophecised to marry a dead man and finds his corpse inside a palace; she is locked in and holds a vigil for him for a certain period, until a potter girl, who has joined the heroine, tricks the revived dead man into thinking she is his saviour; the heroine is made to be the potter girl's maidservant, until she tells her story to a talking doll or to parrots; the revived dead man learns of the princess's tale and punishes the potter girl.

The tale type is also closely related to AaTh 425G, "False Bride Takes Heroine’s Place". However, the last major revision of the International Folktale Classification Index, published in 2004 by German folklorist Hans-Jörg Uther, subsumed tale type AaTh 437 as new type ATU 894, "The Ogre Schoolmaster and the Stone of Pity".

==== Combinations ====
Ramanujan states that the story is combined in India with a local version of the King Lear judgment, indexed as type AT 923B (after 2004, ATU 923B), "The Princess Who Was Responsible for Her Own Fortune". In the same vein, according to Enzyklopädie des Märchens, type 437 may borrow as a starting episode sequences from other types, such as from ATU 923, "Love Like Salt".

=== Motifs ===
==== The heroine's role ====
According to Enzyklopädie des Märchens, type 437, "The Needle Prince", is thus called for the task the heroine must undertake in Indian, Persian and Tajik variants: remove the pins or needles from the prince's body.

The heroine is also considered to be more active, since the prince is the one who is in a passive state, and discovers the truth by heroine's actions, who asks for the objects she will reveal the tale to.

==== The heroine's confidante ====
The heroine may tell her sorrows to the stone of patience, which is replaced by a doll or a "patience box" in other tales. The stone of patience serves to reveal the truth, since another person eavesdrops on the heroine's confession. In some tales, the heroine's suffering is so strong, the stone explodes or melts.

=== Interpretations ===
Ramanujan cited it as an example of "woman-centered folktale", and the Indian tale showcases a wife's devotion and a new bride's loneliness and fear in a new household. Similarly, the tale type is said to be primarily part of female tellers' repertoire.

== Variants ==
Israeli professor Dov Noy reported that the tale type 894 was "very popular in Oriental literature", with variants found in India, Iran, Egypt and regionally in Europe (southern and eastern).

As for type 437, Richard Dorson stated that it appears "sporadically in Europe", but it is "better known in India". In this regard, according to Enzyklopädie des Märchens, type 437 is reported in Europe (South, Southeastern, Eastern and Northeast), in the Caucasus, Middle East, North Africa, Central Asia and India.

=== India ===
According to Stith Thompson's second revision of the international index, type AaTh 437 was reported with five variants in India. In turn, Ramanujan stated that variants of tale type 437 exist in Bengali, Hindi, and Marathi. According to Kannada scholarship, type 437 is "very popular" in South Karnataka.

==== The King of Pins ====
In a tale from New Goa, collected in the Konkani language, The King of Pins, a princess gives alms to a beggar lady. In return, the lady prays that the maiden will marry the "King of Pins". Her interest piqued, the princess asks around the location of this prince. She meets a fairy who turns her to stone, but the fairy's son restores the princess and gives her a black hen with chicks and a spinning wheel. When she reaches her destination, she enters a fabulous palace and enter a room. Inside, there is a prince in a coma-like state, his body prickled by pins from head to toe. The princess then begins to take out the pins. Unfortunately, she falls asleep, and a "wicked black woman" appears to finish her job. When all pins are taken out of his body, he awakens and sees the black woman instead of princess, thinking her to be his saviour. The prince places the black woman in better apartments and the princess in the quarters below. The princess then takes out the spinning wheel which she trades with the black woman for one night in the prince's chambers. The black woman allows it, but gives a sleeping drink to the prince, so the princess cannot talk to him. The next day, the princess trades the hen with chicks for another night with the prince, and manages to talk to him, for he avoided drinking the potion. He discovers the whole truth, hangs the black woman and marries the princess. (Note: Portuguese scholar Isabel Cárdigos classified the tale in the Portuguese Folktale Catalogue as a Goan variant of type 437, Portuguese: O Príncipe Morto é Ressuscitado, lit. 'The Dead Prince is Revived', with the second part being type 425A, wherein the heroine trades objects with a false bride for a night in the prince's quarters.)

==== The Sister (Bharia) ====
In a Central Indian tale collected from a Bharia source in Mandla and titled The Sister, a princess with seven brothers receives a prophecy by an astrologer: she will marry a corpse. Their father, the king, dismisses the words and forgets about it. Years later, she and her brothers go on a hunt. They soon become thirsty and find a house in the jungle, furnished and filled with provisions. They drink water and spend the night there. The next morning, the brothers take their servants with them and exit the house, when its doors lock the princess in. The princess wanders about the house and finds it full of utensils, food and clothes, and finds the body of a man with innumerable pins on it. Her brothers realize her fate is coming true and leave her be. The princess then begins to remove the pins on the man one by one. Meanwhile, the princes return home and report to his parents the occurrence. Their mother fashions a doll of rag and sends it with a maidservant to her daughter in the jungle. When the maidservant arrives, the princess has removed almost every pin, save from those on his face, when she welcomes the maidservant with some water to drink, and leaves to take a bath. While she is busy, the maidservant removes the last pins and revives the prince, who mistakes her for his saviour. The princess comes back from the bath and finds the prince awakened, and the maidservant lies she is a lowly servant. The princess takes the doll of rag to the bunyan tree, which comes alive at night to provide food the princess and to bathe her. The princess confides in the doll, which tells her her sorrow will end in four days. In the morning, the doll returns to an immobile state; the princess returns to the prince's house and is beaten by the maidservant. The next night, the Lamans follow the princess to the riverside, see women coming out to bathe the princess, and report to the prince. On the third night, the prince himself follows the princess and witness the same scene. By the fourth day, the prince confronts the princess about her true identity, and she reveals everything. The prince marries the true princess at once, and she requests the prince to fill the maidservant's nose and mouth with marking nuts and cowry shells and bury her alive. It happens thus, and the prince takes his wife into his house.

==== The Clever Princess ====
In a tale from Himachal Pradesh with the title The Clever Princess, a king's daughter and a minister's daughter are friends and playmates. A guru teaches the girls and is paid with gold coins by the princess and with silver coins by the minister's daughter. He also predicts that the princess will marry a corpse and her friend a prince. The king worries for his daughter's fate, since the Guru's predictions have been true in the past, and takes her to the forest to do charity to beggars and mendicants. While in the forest, they get thirsty and find a small house, where they believe they can drink water. The princess enters the house and the door locks behind her, keeping her in. She realizes she is trapped inside, cries, then decides to explore the place, when she discovers the whole house is furnished. She opens every room and discovers a man's body covered with dub grass - the man she realizes is her intended husband. The princess has a dream that, if she prays to the Sun God and remove a blade of dub grass every day, he would awake, thus she begins her task the next day. In time, she begins to feel lonely, when an oil merchant passes by the house to rest. The princess notices he has a daughter, and insists that she stays and becomes her companion. After the merchant oil leaves, his daughter learns from the princess how to revive the dead man, and goes to finish the task the next day, since there is only a blade of dub grass left. On doing this, the man revives and sees the oil merchant's daughter, promising to marry her. The princess enters the man's room and finds the dead man has been revived, but the merchant's daughter lies that she is but a maidservant. Some time later, the man goes to town to buy gifts for his wife (red bangles and other accessories) and the maidservant (a Mina bird). The man brings the bird to the maidservant (the princess), who teaches the bird her whole story. The oil merchant's daughter wants to have the bird gone, and the man takes the cage to his room. The mina bird begins to repeat the princess's whole story, and he learns of the whole truth. The oil merchant's daughter confirms the bird's words and the man wants to have her killed, but the princess begs him to spare her. Thus, the princess marries the man from the house, makes the oil merchant's daughter their servant, and returns to her father.

==== The Black Wooden Doll ====
In a tale from Bihar titled The Black Wooden Doll, translated to Russian with the title "Черная деревянная кукла" ("Black Wooden Doll"), a Rani devotes herself to the sadhus and rewards them whenever they come to her palace. One day, she is entertaining a sadhu and sends her daughters to repay him with a plate of gold coins and gems. The sadhu thanks the girls, but prophecizes that the elder princess shall marry a dead man. Fearing for her elder's fate, the Rani escapes with the two princesses to the forest. Tired and thirsty, they send the elder to fetch water from a palace they found in the forest. When the elder princess enters it, its doors lock her inside. The Rani asks her to see if she can find any help inside the palace, and the elder princess finds the palace furnished, and the body of a man riddled with needles all over it. The Rani presumes the dead man is her daughter's predicted husband, and advises her to remove the needles. The elder princess removes every needle for years, when one day she spots a servant girl drawing water from the palace well. The princess asks the servant to look after the man's body while she rests for a while, and the servant removes the last needles from the body. The dead man, who is a prince, wakes up, sees the servant and declares her to be his wife, while the princess is made to be their servant. Sometime later, the prince goes on a journey and asks which gifts he can bring them: the maidservant asks for needle and thread and the princess for a wooden black doll. The prince brings the requested gifts and the princess confides in the black wooden doll about her woes. The doll answers the princess that she was the prince's true saviour, not the maidservant. The prince overhears the princess talking to the doll and confronts her the following morning. The princess denies everything, but the prince realizes the maidservant tricked him and banishes her, then marries the princess.

==== The Sangudda-Sanguddi Box ====
In a Magahi language tale titled "संगुड्डा-संगुड्डी के पेटारा" ("Sangudda-Sanguddi ke petara"; "The Sangudda-Sanguddi Box"), a woman has two daughters. One day, a sadhu comes and predicts that one of her daughters will marry a young man, while the other will wed a dead man. Intent on avoiding this prophecy, the woman marries the first daughter off and takes the other with her far away as they can. While walking on the road, evening comes and they feel tired and thirsty. The woman send her daughter to find water for them, and the girl enters a house in search of water. The gate locks behind her, and both the girl and her mother cry that the sadhu's prophecy has been fulfilled. The woman leaves back home while her daughter explores the house: she finds a set of keys and opens many doors, finding provisions, jewels, silver and gold, clothes, and lastly a dead body. The girl holds a vigil for the person's body for days on end. One day, she hears a voice calling from outside, offering a maidservant. The girl wishes to have a maidservant for companion, since she is there all alone next to a dead man's body. The girl and the maidservant spend time together talking and chatting up. Some time later, the girl tells her companion she will sleep in another room. While the other is away, the maidservant waits next to the dead man, who wakes up from the long death-like state. The person is a king, and notices the maidservant, whom he mistakes for his saviour and declares her to be his queen. His true saviour is made to be their maidservant. Later, a Chhath fair is held, and the king asks his wife, the false queen, which gifts she wants from the fair. The king notices that the queen did not have a dowry with her, and she blames the maidservant. The king goes to ask the servant girl which gifts she wants, and she asks for the "Sangudda-Sanguddi Box". The king goes to the Chhath fair and buys presents for the false queen, but forgets about the "Sangudda-Sanguddi Box" and cannot find it. Thus he wanders from village to village until he reaches the house of a woman, who says she has the box, which is her daughter's, and gives it to the king for free. The king returns home and gives the "Sangudda-Sanguddi Box" to the servant girl. She goes to graze the goats and tells her woes to the box. At night, the goat-herder takes the goats to graze and hears a voice saying to the "Sangudda-Sanguddi" about how a queen became a servant and a servant became a queen. The box also gives food to the servant girl. The goat-herder tells he king about the voice that was heard and bids the goat-herder take him there. The king overhears the same words and knocks on the door to the servant girl's room, asking her who is she talking to. The servant opens the door and explains she is talking to the "Sangudda-Sanguddi Box", which grants whatever its owner asks for, like food and drinks. She then recounts everything: how her mother learned of a prediction about one daughter marrying a living bridegroom and the other a dead one, how they escaped, how she was locked behind the gate, and only her mother had the "Sangudda-Sanguddi Box". The king learns of the deception and buries the false queen in a pit.

==== Tales combined with type ATU 923B ====
===== The Lucky Princess =====
In a tale from Uttar Pradesh published by author Krishna Prakash Bahadur with the title The Lucky Princess, a king summons his seven daughters to ask them by whose good fortune do they have food to eat. The six elder princesses answer that it is their father's good fortune, while the youngest says it is herself. The king, enraged, promises to find a dead man for her to marry: he marries his six elder daughters to princes, and takes his cadette with him to the forest to fulfil his threat. While in the forest, they get thirsty, and the king orders his daughter to enter a nearby house in search of water. As soon as she enters, the door closes on her, and the king leaves her there. As for the princess, she notices she is inside a palace; she opens every room and finds a dead prince's body in the attic, all prickled with needles. The princess decides to remove the needles, one by one. One day, a merchant passes by the palace and offers a maidservant, whom the princess takes for herself. While the maidservant does the chores around the palace, the princess dedicates to the task of removing the needles. Thus, the time comes when there are only three remaining needles on his eyelid, and the princess asks the maidservant to cover for her, while she goes to take a bath. Seizing the opportunity, the maidservant removes the last needles and revives the prince, lying to him she is a princess and the real princess is a mere servant. Some time later, the prince buys from the market an emerald and a pigtail for the false princess and a doll on the true's one request. The real princess tells her sorrows to the doll every night, which sparks the prince's curiosity to hear it. The prince asks the maidservant about her taletelling to the doll, and the real princess reveals the deceit. The prince then turns the maidservant inside out, and marries the real princess.

===== The Princess who Loved her Father like Salt =====
India-born author Maive Stokes collected and published the Indian tale The Princess who Loved her Father like Salt. In the first part of the tale, three princesses are asked a question about how much they love their father. After the princess is banished by her father to the jungle, she finds a palace deep within the jungle. Inside lies a prince in a deep sleep, his body prickled by needles. She begins the task of carefully taking each needle, one by one, until one day she purchases a slave girl to keep her company. Maive Stokes compared this tale to a Sicilian variant collected by folklorist Laura Gonzenbach, with the name Der böse Schulmeister und die wandernde Königstochter ("The Evil Schoolmaster and the Wandering Princess").

===== The Needle Prince =====
In a tale collected by Sunity Devi, Maharani of Coochbehar, with the title The Needle Prince, seven princesses who are sisters talk among themselves about leaving or not leaving their parents' home: the six elder princesses would rather stay with their parents, while the youngest, although reluctant to express her opinions at first, tells them she would like to marry one day and live with her husband always. The other princesses show their concern with their cadette's answer, since their parents might expel her for those words, and threaten to tell their mother about it. Afraid, the princess flees in fear into the forest, and stumbles upon an abandoned house. She walks to the house, which is in fact a richly furnished palace, takes a bath in a swimming pool filled with rosewater, eats some food, and finds the body of a handsome young man lying as if dead, pierced with thousand of needles. The princess decides to remove the needles one by one, and, fourteen days later, all but two have been removed. Suddenly, the princess notices one of her maidservants from her parents' palace, an ugly, dark and fat woman, has found her in the forest palace. The princess lets her in and places her to watch over the body, while she herself goes to rest and take a bath. The maidservant disregards the princess's warning not to touch anything on the man's body, and removes the last two needles from his eyelids, reviving him. The man thinks that the maidservant was the one that did the whole task. As for the princess, she puts on a beautiful sari and goes to the dead man's room, when she finds the man is awake. Her maidservant lies to the man that the beautiful princess is but her maidservant. The man silently notices the princess's beauty, but believes the lie that is a maidservant, then reveals he is a prince under the needles curse, and only a princess could have saved him. However, while he is set on marrying his saviour, he must postpone the wedding until he hears music again, for his kingdom is silent and abandoned. As time passes, the maidservant humiliates and beats the princess, and she cries for her fate. One day, she cries in the garden and fairies come to comfort her, saying that the prince will eventually know the truth. More time passes, and the maidservant, passing herself off as a princess, threatens the prince into marrying her, but he goes for a walk in the garden and sees a light in the distance: it is the true princess, conversing with the fairies, to whom she tells how everything transpired, from her removing the needles to her replacement by her own maidservant. The prince overhears the story and approaches the girl, proposing to marry her in the garden, surrounded by the fairies and blessed by two Brahmins. The pair then confront the maidservant about her trickery.

===== The Comatosed Prince =====
In a Deccan tale titled The Comatosed Prince, a king sends for his daughters and asks them who they love best. The elder princesses admit they love their father, but the youngest princess, Naila, says she loves Allah best. The king is offended by this and banishes his daughter from the realm. In the forest, she forages for food and finds a dilapidated castle: inside, the body of a prince with needles all over his body. She decides to hold a vigil and remove the needles from his body. Sometime later, she brings a slave named Ramadha as a companion while she finishes up the task. Naila leaves for a while, then Ramadha removes the last needles from the prince's eyes, causing him to return to life. The prince wakes up, says his name is Prince Shujjah, and mistakes Ramadha as his saviour. Ramadha lies that she is the princess, then goes to talk to Naila to force her to become their servant and not to reveal anything to the prince, lest Ramadha expels her from the palace. Naila does the chores and goes to her room to pray, then cries after her prayers. Suddenly, three fairies enter the room and comfort the fallen princess from her suffering. The princess keeps talking to the fairies, which draws prince Shujjah's attention. The prince overhears Naila talking to the fairies one night, then goes to talk to Naila herself about how he was tricked by the slave Ramadha. Shujjah then promises to punish the slave, and marries Naila.

=== Nepal ===
In a tale collected from a female Maithil informant named Indu Karna in the village of Nagarain, Mithila region, in Nepal, with the title Second Wife (Dutti Bar), a king has a daughter and brings a priest to divine her fate. The priest predicts she will have a good fate, but is destined to become a cowife (sauta). Thinking such a position is beneath her, he takes the girl with him to the jungle to avoid this fate. In the jungle, the king becomes thirsty and sends his daughter to a house in the forest for water. The princess drinks some and goes to bring it to her father, when the doors to the house lock her in and keep her father outside. The king tries to release his daughter, but gives up seven days later. Back to the princess, she discovers a sleeping man in the house (whose dead body, the teller explains, has been kept inside the house) and decides to provide him service (sewa), by taking care of the house. She also forages for food in the forest and befriends the jungle animals. After twelve years, the man wakes up from his sleep and spots a servant girl (dasi) whom he marries, while the princess is walking in the jungle. The servant girl pretends to be royalty and lies to the sleeping man, a king's son, that the princess is her own maidservant. The king's son returns to his father's king with his new wife and the princess in tow, and assumes the throne. The king's son notices the beauty in the one he believes is the queen's maidservant, to the queen's concern, so she has a burka made to hide the princess's beauty. One day, the young king is ready to go the market and asks both women which gifts he can bring them: the false queen asks for a necklace, while the princess asks for a "smiling-but-not-smiling box", like one that she had in her childhood, given by her mother. While looking for such a box and the necklace, the young king muses about how his wife spoke like a servant and their maidservant spoke like a queen, and eventually reaches the princess's home kingdom, where he finds the box at the marketplace. The tale explains the princess's father took to the forest and the queen sold the box she gave to her daughter. The king's son returns with the box and gives it to the maidservant. At the young king's palace, the false queen humiliates the real princess and makes her do lowly chores, like collecting cow dung. The princess takes the "smiling-but-not-smiling box" and, after doing the chores for the day, she pours out her woes to the box, saying how she, Gauri's daughter, is made to cry while the servant girl is now a queen, but the box replies to the princess her day will still come. The box also provides her with food and drinks on the princess's request, like the box did it when she was young. One night, the princess is at a pond with the magic box. Soon enough, a man is looking for a place to defecate and begins to hear a woman's wail, which is the princess telling her story to the box. The man reports the incident to the young king, who accompanies the man to witness the event: the box asks the princess the reason for her crying, and she admits that, being a king's daughter, she misses her parents, so the box promises to take her back to her parents' kingdom. The young king returns to the palace and questions the false queen about the origin of their maidservant, information which the servant girl queen cannot provide. The following day, the magic box provides a stool (pihiya) to the princess so that she could return to her parents' kingdom, when the young king stops her from taking flight and confronts her. The princess tells the young king everything: how her fate is to be a cowife, how she was locked inside the house in the jungle and spent time near the young king's body for twelve years, and how the false queen, who is in fact a servant girl, took her place. The young king's suspicions are confirmed that their maidservant had regal bearing, and promises to make the princess his only queen, not a cowife. Thus, he kills the first wife, the servant girl, and marries the princess as his only wife.

== See also ==
- Kajalrekha (Bengali folk ballad)
- Pentamerone
- The Lord of Lorn and the False Steward
- The Goose Girl
- The Young Slave
- The Maiden with the Rose on her Forehead
- The Bay-Tree Maiden
- Sleeping Beauty
- The Sleeping Prince (fairy tale)
- Life's Secret (Bengali folktale)
- A Dead Husband (Assamese folktale)
