= The Sleeping Prince (fairy tale) =

Greek fairy tale

The Sleeping Prince is a Greek fairy tale collected by Georgios A. Megas in Folktales of Greece.

It is Aarne-Thompson 425G: False Bride takes the heroine's place as she tries to stay awake; recognition when heroine tells her story. This is also found as part of Nourie Hadig, and a literary variant forms part of the frame story of the Pentamerone.

The tale type was also closely related to AaTh 437, "The Supplanted Bride (The Needle Prince)". However, the last major revision of the International Folktale Classification Index, written in 2004 by German folklorist Hans-Jörg Uther, subsumed tale type AaTh 437 as new type ATU 894, "The Ogre Schoolmaster and the Stone of Pity".

== Synopsis ==
A king had only his daughter, his wife having died, and had to go to war. The princess promised to stay with her nurse while he was gone. One day, an eagle came by and said she would have a dead man for a husband; it came again the next day. She told her nurse, and her nurse told her to tell the eagle to take her to him. The third day, it came, and she asked; it brought her to a palace, where a prince slept like the dead, and a paper said that whoever had pity on him must watch for three months, three weeks, three days, three hours, and three half-hours without sleeping, and then, when he sneezed, she must bless him and identify herself as the one who watched. He and the whole castle would wake, and he would marry the woman.

She watched three months, three weeks, and three days. Then she heard someone offering to hire maids. She hired one for company. The maid persuaded her to sleep, the prince sneezed, and the maid claimed him. She told him to let the princess sleep and when she woke, set to tend the geese. (The fairy tale starts to refer to the prince as the king.)

The king had to go to war. He asked the queen what she wanted, and she asked for a golden crown. He asked the goose-girl, and she asked for the millstone of patiences, the hangman's rope, and the butcher's knife, and if he did not bring them, his ship would go neither backward nor forward. He forgot them, and his ship would not move; an old man asked him if he had promised anything, so he bought them. He gave his wife the crown and the other things to the goose-girl. That evening, he went down to her room. She told her story to the things and asked them what she should do. The butcher's knife said to stab herself; the rope, to hang herself; the millstone, to have patience. She asked for the rope again and went to hang herself. The king broke in and saved her. He declared she was his wife and he would hang the other on the rope. She told him only to send her away. They went to her father for his blessing.

== Analysis ==
=== Tale type ===
Richard MacGillivray Dawkins described that the "essence" of the tale type involves the heroine being destined to marry "a dead man", which is not dead at all. The prince, in fact, is under a magical sleep in a room in a castle somewhere. The heroine finds him and stays by his side on a long vigil. The heroine hires a maid or slave to help her in the long vigil, but she replaces the heroine and takes credit for awakening the prince. At the end of the tale, the prince, now back to life, is asked by a broken heroine to bring her ("almost always") three objects: a knife, a rope to hang herself with and a stone of patience.

=== Motifs ===
==== Starting episodes ====
The tale type may start with one of two opening episodes: a bird announces to the heroine she will marry a dead man, and she decides to look for him; or the heroine is with her family on a field or in the forest, goes astray and ends up in the dead prince's tomb, where she begins her long vigil over his body.

==== The heroine's requests ====
According to Marianne Klaar, in most of the variants, the heroine asks for the knife of slaughter, a rope for hanging, and a stone of patience. In some variants, the stone of patience swells, then explodes after the heroine tells her woes to it, while it bids the heroine to have patience for her suffering.

==== Other motifs ====
According to Greek folklorist Georgios A. Megas, in subtype AT 425G, the heroine is not promised to, nor marries an animal, but an enchanted prince trapped in an enchanted sleep, and only the heroine may save him by holding a long 40 day vigil.

== Variants ==
=== Distribution ===
Greek scholars Anna Angelopoulou and Aigle Broskou locate variants of type AaTh 425G in Greece, Turkey, Southern Italy, Sicily, Spain, North Africa (among the Berbers) and even in Poland.

Israeli professor Dov Noy reported that the tale type 894 was "very popular in Oriental literature", with variants found in India, Iran, Egypt and regionally in Europe (southern and eastern).

As for type 437, Richard Dorson stated that it appears "sporadically in Europe", but it is "better known in India". Indian scholar A. K. Ramanujan states that the tale type is known in Europe as "The Needle Prince". In this regard, according to Enzyklopädie des Märchens, type 437 is reported in Europe (South, Southeastern, Eastern and Northeast), in the Caucasus, Middle East, North Africa, Central Asia and India.

=== Europe ===
Scholars Ibrahim Muhawi and Sharif Kanaana stated that "in European tradition" type AaTh 894 is found in association with the story of "The Sleeping Prince". Professor Jack V. Haney stated that type 437 is more common in Ukraine, but "uncommon" in Western Europe.

==== Italy ====
A Sicilian variant was collected by Laura Gonzenbach with the title Der böse Schulmeister und die wandernde Königstochter ("The Evil Schoolmaster and the Wandering Princess").

==== Greece ====
According to scholars Anna Angélopoulos and Marianthi Kaplanoglou, the tale type AaTh 425G (now included in the general subtype ATU 425A after 2004) is the "most widely disseminated subtype in Greece, with 118 versions".

In another Greek variant, The Knife of Slaughter, the Whet-stone of Patience and the Unmelting Candle, a girl is broidering when a bird chirps that she is to marry a "lifeless man". One day, she enters a neighbouring house and sees the body of a prince holding a letter in his hand, telling for someone to hold a vigil for three nights, three days and three weeks. Nearing the end of the vigil, she takes in a gypsy as a companion, who takes the credit for the vigil. After the prince and the gypsy marry, she asks the prince to bring her the titular items: the Knife of Slaughter, the Whet-stone of Patience and the Unmelting Candle.

==== Spain ====
Hispanist Ralph Steele Boggs located a Spanish tale he numbered as type *445B (a number not added to the revision of the international index, at the time), in his 1930 index. In this story, the princess holds a vigil on a king that will only awake on St. John's Day. She buys a slave woman for company, who takes her place at the king's bed and passes herself as his saviour. The despondent princess asks the prince to bring her two objects: a hard stone and the branch of bitterness. The king learns these are objects requested by people who are on the verge on taking their own lives. Scholars Wolfram Eberhard and Pertev Naili Boratav (1953) considered this story so close to the Turkish tales that they believed it to be a version that developed locally. Later, scholars Julio Camarena and Maxime Chevalier, in their updated Spanish catalogue (1995), considered Boggs's indexing as tale type AaTh 437, "La novia suplantada (La espina del príncipe)".

==== Armenia ====
According to Armenian scholarship, Armenia also registers similar tales about the heroine's confession to the object of patience. In Armenian tales, the object is called Sabri Xrcig or Doll of Patience, related to the cycle of stories called Le Prince endormi ("The Sleeping Prince"). The "Doll of Patience" (Armenian: Սաբրի խրծիկ; Sabri khrtsik) is a dowry gift, given to the newlywed bride and which acts as her confidante as she moves to an unknown household after marriage.

Professor Susan Hoogasian-Villa collected two variants from Armenian tellers in Detroit. In the first, titled Saber Dashee, during a pilgrimage to Jerusalem, a girl loses her way from her family and enters an abandoned house. Inside, a man under a cursed sleep, on whom she has to bear ten years on a vigil. She gets replaced by a gypsy girl, who marries the prince after the vigil. The heroine asks for the Saber Dashee and pours out her story to it. In a second story, The Dead Bridegroom, the trees and the river predict that a girl will marry a dead man. The girl enters a palace that locks behind her, then sees a man in a cursed-like sleep. Hoogasian-Villa noted that it follows very closely the outline of the first variant.

==== Azerbaijan ====
Azerbaijani scholarship registers a similar tale in Azerbaijan as tale type 437, "Ölüyə qismət olan qız" ("A girl destined for the dead"). In the Azeri type, the heroine is responsible for rescuing the love interest by reciting the Quran by his head for forty days and nights, or by removing the needles from his feet, or by chasing away the flies from his body; a servant girl (or gypsy girl) takes over for the heroine in the last moments and takes up the credit for saving the dead man and they marry; the heroine goes through a cycle of transformations, and may reveal the truth by telling her tale to a stone of patience or knife in a scabbard, or by writing it on a carpet, or by telling her story while stringing pearls in front of an audience.

==== Albania ====
In an Albanian tale published by Lucy Garnett with the title The Maiden who was Promised to the Sun, a queen prays to the Sun to give her one daughter, and the Sun agrees, with the condition that she relinquishes the girl to him when she is of age. It does happen and the girl is taken to the Sun. At the Sun's abode, there lives a Koutchedra (kulshedra) that hungers to devour the maiden. She escapes with the help of a stag and returns home (tale type ATU 898, "The Girl Promised to the Sun"). In the second part of the story, the girl enters a garden and opens a locked gate that closes itself behind her. She discovers the petrified body of a prince and she decides to release him from this curse, by holding a vigil for three days, three nights and three weeks without sleeping. Nearing the end of the trial, and feing tired, she hires a slave woman to continue the vigil in her place, when the girl with reassume her position by the prince's side. The slave woman ends up replacing the princess as the man's saviour and marries him. The girl laments her fate to the "Stone of Patience" and the prince overhears her story.

==== Lithuania ====
Lithuanian folklorist Jonas Balys, in his analysis of Lithuanian folktales (published in 1936), listed one variant of type *446 (a type not indexed in the international classification, at the time), under the banner Miegas karalaitis ("The Sleeping Prince"). In the only recorded tale, the princess finds the coffin of the sleeping prince and a note to hold a vigil for three nights.

==== Latvia ====
According to the Latvian Folktale Catalogue, in type 437, Neīstā līgava ("The False Bride"), the heroine helps break the curse on the whole kingdom, until a girl comes and takes the credit for the deed. The true heroine asks the prince to bring her a stone or a doll, to which she tells her story.

==== Slavic languages ====
Russian scholarship indexes a similar narrative in the East Slavic Folktale Classification (Russian: СУС, romanized: SUS), as tale type SUS -533**, "Царевна и служанка" ("The Princess and the Servant"): a princess reads a magic book to break the spell on a prince, but a maidservant finishes the job and takes the credit for awakening the sleeping prince; the deception is eventually revealed. The East Slavic index registers few texts in Russia, Ukraine, and Belarus.

==== Judeo-Spanish people ====
In a Judeo-Spanish tale collected by Cynthia Mary Crews from a source in Salonica with the title La niña y el joven resuscitado ("The Girl and the Revived Youth), the stepmother abandons her stepdaughter, who enters a palace where she finds a dead body. She reads a note saying one should fan the dead body for forty days and forty nights for the youth to wake up and marry the one who revived him. The girl finds a gypsy servant to help her, but she gypsy woman fans the prince in the last night, revives him and marries him. The girl later tries to kill herself, but the revived youth stops her, learns of the whole truth and marries his true saviour.

=== Asia ===
==== Turkey ====
According to Dov Noy, the Turkish Folktale Catalogue (Typen türkischer Volksmärchen, or TTV) by Wolfram Eberhard and Pertev Naili Boratav registered 38 variants in the country. In their joint work, the Turkish tales were grouped under type TTV 185, Der Geduldstein II.

In a Turkish variant collected by folklorist Ignác Kúnos with the title Stone-Patience and Knife-Patience, a poor woman's daughter stays at home when a bird chirps that "death" is her kismet ('fate', 'destiny'). The situation repeats itself, to the mother's concern. She decides to let her daughter walk a bit with the neighbour's daughters to put her mind at ease. When walking with the girls, a huge wall rises out of the ground to isolate the poor woman's daughter from the others, who return to the village to inform the old woman of the occurrence. Back to the girl: she finds a door on the wall, opens it and is transported to a grand palace. The girl opens all doors, filled with treasures and gems, and behind the fortieth door, lies a Bey on a bed holding a note that says a damsel must stay by his side for 40 days to find her kismet. So she decides to follow the note. Time passes, the girl meets a black woman outside of the palace and brings her in to help her vigil. The Bey awakes, sees the black girl and thinks she is his saviour. At the end of the tale, the girl asks the Bey to bring her a stone-of-patience of a yellow colour and a knife-of-patience with brown handle. She gets both items: she tells her woes to the stone, but chooses the knife. The Bey appears in the nick of time to stop her attempt.

==== Iraqi Turkmens ====
In an Iraqi Turkmen tale from Telafer with the title Sabır Daşı, translated to Turkish as Sabır Taşı ("The Stone of Patience"), a girl named Fatmacik lives with her father and mother. Her teaches sends Fatmacik to the fountain to draw water, and one day a hand emerges from the water and predicts that a dead Pashaoğlu (Pasha's son) is her destiny. Fatmacik withholds this information from her parents, who press her for answers. The girl reveals about the prediction, the family moves away from the village, and settle in an empty palace whose doors are all closed. Fatmacik is the only one to open any door in the palace. She enters the palace and sees a man lying on a bed, as if he is dead, his body covered in pins. Fatmacik is locked inside the palace, and her family leave her there since they cannot open the doors. Back to Fatmacik, she starts to remove the pins from the body, then goes to the roof of the palace in search of anyone else that may appear. One day, she sees a family in the distance and shouts for them to come to the palace. A girl named Hatice enters the dead man's palace, finds the body and reveals the last pins from the Pasha's son's face, restoring him to life. The Pasha's son wakes up and mistakes Hatice for his saviour, and Fatmacik is made their servant. One day, the Pasha's son plans to travel and asks which presents he can bring them: Hatice ask for clothes and other gifts, and Fatmacik for a patience stone. The Pasha's son buys the stone patience from a merchant, who warns him not to leave alone the person who asked for the stone. Fatmacik tells her woes to the stone every day, and the Pasha's son overhears her lamentations. One day, Fatmacik asks the patient stone whether Fatmacik or the stone is cracking. The Pasha's son enters the room and says that the stone is to crack, and the stone cracks. The Pasha's son realizes the truth, divorces from Hatice, marries Fatmacik and takes her parents to live with them in their palace.

In a tale from the Iraqi Turkmens, collected in Kirkuk with the title Sabır Daşı, and translated to Turkish as Sabır Taşı ("The Stone of Patience"), a girl of seventeen named Melek lives with her family. One time, she has a dream about many doors, which repeats for many days. Melek tells her family about the dreams and they decide to consult someone. After consulting many religious scholars, the family decides to move, without knowing where to go. They eventually reach a palace which only Melek is able to enter. After she enters, the palace gates locke her in, leaving her family outside. Her father and her mother try to open the gate, to no avail, and leave her there. Melek wanders through the palace and sees many doors that lead to rooms filled with jewels, clothes and otehr riches. Finally, she enters the last room and finds a man lying with 101 nails all over his body. Melek reads a letter which contains instructions on how to revive the man: wash his body, dress him in clean clothes, recite prayers and remove each nail. Melek follows the letter's instructions and cares for the man for days. One day, she notices she is very tired, and hears a group of slaves walking by the palace. Melek decides to buy a female slave as a companion, and forbids her from entering the last room, which houses the man's body. Eventually, Melek removes all but one nail, and goes to take a bath. The slave enters the last room, reads the letter and applies the instructions to the body. The man wakes up and asks the slave if she was the one who cared for him, and she lies that she did so. Melek returns, finds the man woken up, but decides to stay silent. The man marries the slave and allows Melek to live with them. In time, Melek becomes their maidservant. One day, the man asks which presents he can bring them from a journey: the slavewoman asks for jewels and clothes, while Melek asks for the patient stone. The man finds the patient stone in an apothecary, who warns him about minding whomever he gives the stone to. The man returns home and gifts Melek with the patient stone. The man is curious about the gift and spies on Melek talking to the stone for days on end, until the stone cracks from absorbing Melek's suffering. The man realizes that Melek was his true saviour, banishes the slavewoman from the palace by tying her to a donkey, and recognizes Melek's pure heart and enduring patience. He then marries Melek.

==== Azeri Turks ====
In an Azeri Turk tale collected in Tebriz with the title Sitare Behti Gare, a family in a village has a daughter named Sitare ("star"). One day, she goes to draw water from a fountain, when a voice comes from nowhere and shouts "Sitare Behti Gare" ("Bahtı kara"), meaning Sitare's fate is an unlucky one. Sitare feels afraid, goes home and avoids mentioning the incident to her family. A week later, she returns to draw water and the voice sounds again. Finally, she decides to reveal the incident and tells her grandmother about it. Time passes, and Sitare reaches marriageable age. Her family decide to leave their home village and depart. They stop by a palace and ask Sitare to fetch some water from the palace garden. She enters the palace to draw water, and a voice repeats the same words. Sitare and her family enter a nearby village and her relatives send her to fetch water again from a rich house. She enters the house, but she cannot leave it, for the is locked in while her family is outside. Her old relatives realize this is Sitare's fate, however it may be, and leave her to her fate. Sitare cries for a while, then decides to explore the palace: she finds the place empty, save for food and jewels. After some days of exploration, she finds a small room housing a coffin with a handsome youth inside, under a shroud. Sitare removes the shroud and finds that his body is covered in numerous needles, and a letter and a Quran near the head. The letter states that the youth is the son of the owner of the house, cursed by witches into that state, and one can restore him to life by praying, reading the Quran for forty days and removing the needles. Sitare sets herself to the task and falls in love with the sleeping youth, until, after some ten or fifteen days she starts to feel tired. She rests for a while and sees a caravan selling servants. She buys a female servant to help her, then restarts the task. After thirty-nine days, while Sitare is sleeping, the female servant takes the Quran to finish the vigil. By doing this, the youth wakes up, sees the female servant and mistakes her for his saviour, marrying her. They make Sitare their servant. Time passes, and one day, the youth asks the false saviour which presents she wants from the journey: she wants gold, headscarves and shoes, and Sitare asks for a stone of patience. He finds a dervish selling the stone of patience and buys it. The dervish asks the youth to whom he plans to give the stone, and warns that whoever asked for it has great sorrow in their heart, so the youth needs to watch the girl that asked for the stone, since her sorrow will transfer to the stone, but she will die from it; so he must take the stone and smash it on the ground to dissipate her sorrow and grief. The youth returns home and gives the stone to Sitare. Sitare begins to pour out her woes to the stone, until she concludes her narration to the stone by saying that either the stone or she will burst. Suddenly, the youth enters Sitare's room and smashes the stone on the ground. The youth asks for Sitare's forgiveness for his mistake, and ties the servant to a mule and let loose in the desert.

In a Southern Azerbaijan tale titled Səbir daşı or Səbr daşı ("Stone of Patience"), a girl named Sitarə lives with her family. One day, when she reaches marriageable age, she goes to wash clothes by the river next to her village, when a crow perches on a branch and cries out "Sitarə – bəxti qara!" and that Sitarə is destined for a dead person. Sitarə runs back home in tears and tells her parents about it. Her family decide to leave, make some provisions and depart from the village, fearing the prophecy. They walk for a long while, and reach the gates of a castle by a valley. Sitarə's mother says that if they stayed in the village, their daughter would have died. They stop to rest and eat, then try to knock on the door: Sitarə's father and mother cannot open it; Sitarə knocks on the gate and manages to enter the palace, but the gate locks her in. Their family try to break the heavy iron gate down after her, to no avail, then leave their daughter to her fate. Sitarə wanders the rooms and finds a throne room, with a handsome youth asleep. She reads a piece of paper above the youth's head: if a girl recites forty surahs from the Quran and removes the 40 needles from his chest, he will wake up and take her. Sitarə prepares herself for the task and does it diligently for thirty-nine days. On the fortieth day, she sees a gypsy girl by the window of the palace and decides to pull her in through the window. She gives her food and drink and goes to sleep, then the gypsy girl reads the paper above the youth, read the final surah and removes the last needle, causing the youth to return to life. The youth wakes up, sees the gypsy girl and accepts her as his fate, but secretly worries about marrying an ugly girl. The gypsy girl points to the sleeping Sitarə as their maidservant. The youth sees the sleeping Sitarə, notices her beauty and thinks of marrying her instead. The following morning, the youth is going to the market to buy clothes, and asks Sitarə what he can bring her. Sitarə requests for a stone of patience and a knife. He goes to the market and buys a bridal dress and golden ornaments for the gypsy girl, then enters a store to ask for the stone and the knife for Sitarə. The storeowner sells the youth the stone and the knife, and warns him that whoever asked for it is suffering, for they will tell their troubles to the stone and kill themselves, so the youth is to spy on their maidservant, since she will tell her suffering to the stone in a secluded place and kill herself with the knife. The youth returns with the stone and gives it to Sitarə. The girl enters a room and begins to tell her woes to the stone of patience: about the prediction, her family's journey, her task for forty days, and how the gypsy girl replaced her. Sitarə finishes her narration wishing for death and is ready to kill herself, when the youth stops her in time. He admits that he listened to her story, tells her they are each other's, and sends the gypsy girl away with the gifts. The youth calls his tribe and marries Sitarə in a seven day and seven night celebration.

In an Azeri Turkish tale collected from a source in Erdebil with the title Seng-i Sebir, a man and his wife have a daughter. One day, the girl goes to the courtyard to wash her hands, and sees a bird perch on a branch. She extends her hands and lets the bird fly to her hand. The bird then begins to sing that the girl is destined for a dead man. The girl is aghast and sad at the bird's words and reports to her family. Her parents sell their possessions and leave their house to avoid their daughter's fate. Eventually, they reach a house. The parents cannot open its door, save for the girl. The girl is locked inside and wanders through the halls and finds a dead man's corpse prickled by pins, then informs her family and asks them to leave her to her fate. The girl starts a vigil for the dead man by reading the Quran by his head and removing a needle after each reading, until there is only a last needle. One day, she sees a caravan passing in front of the house and buys a gypsy girl to be her servant. She takes the gypsy inside and tells her not to touch the Quran and the last needle, while she goes to wash her hair. After the girl leaves, the gypsy girl reads the Quran and removes he last needle. The dead man returns to life and believes that the gypsy girl is to become his wife, since he mistakes her for his saviour. The true saviour, the girl, is made to be their servant. The trio go to the market to ship, and the girl asks for a patience stone ("seng-i sebir"). The man buys the patience stone and gives it to her. She takes the stone and goes to talk to it, revealing her sorrows to the stone and finishing the narration with the warning that either she will crack, or the stone. The man overhears the girl's confession to the stone and learns the truth of his mistake. He then marries his true saviour and makes the gypsy girl their servant.

==== Iran ====
According to a study by Russian scholar Vladimir Minorsky, the tale type appears in Iran as type 437, Sang-e Sabur, with varied starting episodes: either a voice predicts the heroine's destiny lies with a dead man, or the heroine and her family are in a desert. Either way, the heroine enters a palace alone, the door locks her in, and she meets a prince lying on a slab, his body full of needles. She removes the needles for 40 days, but a Gypsy girl replaces her and marries the prince. At the end of the tale, the heroine tells her woes to a stone of patience and is overheard by the prince. Later, German scholar Ulrich Marzolph reported 22 variants of tale type 894, Der Geduldstein, across Iranian sources. In the Iranian tale, the heroine's destiny is predicted to be an unhappy one; she drifts away until she reaches a garden and enters a palace, where a youth is lying as if dead, his body prickled with several pins; the heroine helps the youth for almost 40 days, until she tires herself and buys a slavewoman to cover for her. This causes the youth, now awake, to mistake the slavewoman for his true saviour, and marries her, taking the heroine as their maidservant. At the end of the tale, the heroine asks the prince to bring a patience stone, which she tells her woes to.

In a Persian tale collected by Emily Lorimer and David Lockhart Robertson Lorimer, from Kermani, The Story of the Marten-Stone, a king's daughter finds a castle with a sleeping prince inside, his body covered with needles. She begins a long and strenuous vigil, picking each needle for the next 40 days and 40 nights. After her slave girl replaces her as the prince's saviour, she asks for a marten-stone to pour out her woes to.

==== Kurdish people ====
A similar story also exists in the folktale corpus of the Kurdish people. According to the Catalogue of Kurdish Folktales, in tale type 437, "Der Nadelprinz" ("The Needle Prince"), a couple flees with their daughter to escape from a plague; they come across a castle, the girl enters it and is locked inside; she finds the corpse of a youth prickled with many needles; she begins to remove the needles; later, she hires a servant to help her in the castle and she removes the last needles, waking the prince, who thinks the servant is his saviour, instead of the heroine; the heroine asks the youth to bring her an object (the stone of patience), and she tells her woes to it; by doing so, the youth learns the truth, expels the servant and marries the heroine. The Catalogue of Kurdish Folktales registers three variants.

==== Tajikistan ====
Tajik Iranist Anna Rozenfel'd collected a Tajik tale from a Mountain Tajik informant in the Kizvay village, Darwaz, with the title "Мертвец с иголками" ("The Dead Man with Needles"). In this tale, a shah has a daughter, who has a servant as companion. One day, both women enter a house in a garden and find a sleeping man with an inscription beside him: whoever removes the needles from the prince's body shall marry him, but must eat a small morsel of flatbread and a thimble of water every day. The princess's servant decides to submit herself to the harsh vigil and begins removing the needles from the prince's body, leaving a single one on the man's foot. The servant leaves the room, while the princess removes the last needle, causing the prince to wake up. The prince sees the shah's daughter and marries her, thinking she is his saviour, then takes the maid as their servant. Sometime later, the prince goes on a journey and asks which presents he can bring them: the princess asks for a silk red dress and the maid a magic stone. The prince delivers the magic stone to the maid, who begins to tell her woes to the stone. The stone breaks up and releases pus from the inside. The prince notices the pus and asks the maid about her grief, and she reveals how the princess took the credit for the vigil on his body. The prince then marries the maid, his true saviour, and demotes the princess to be their servant. Rozenfel'd noted that the tale also appeared in Iran with the title "The Stone of Patience".

==== Uzbekistan ====
In an Uzbek tale titled Der brennende Stein, translated to Russian as "Горючий камень" ("The Burning Stone") and to French as La pierre qui brûlait ("The Stone that Burns"), a girl named Rose Bloom is fetching flowers, when she follows a trail deep into a mansion. Inside it, there lies the body of a man, all riddled with pins. The girl extracts each pin carefully, until she begins to get tired. She hires a servant girl from a passing caravan to continue the vigil on him. The man wakes up and mistakes the servant girl for Rose Bloom. At the end of the tale, Rose Bloom asks the prince to get her a burning stone: she plans to tell her sorrows to the stone until it bursts into a pyre, and intends to throw herself into it. According to researcher Gabrielle Keller, the Haqiq-Tosch (meaning "burning stone" or "patience stone") is a stone to which a person tells their woes, and the stone begins to burn up; if the person's suffering is too strong, the stone swells and bursts, thus relieving the teller of their secret.

==== Afghanistan ====
In an Afghan tale titled The Seventy-Year-Old Corpse, collected by Hafizullah Baghban from a female informant named Hayāto, in Herat, in 1966, an old man has a daughter and earns his living by collecting and selling thorn bushes. One day, the girl is home and spinning wheel, when a nightingale perches on a wall and says that the girl will marry a seventy-year-old corpse. The girl reports the incident to her father after he returns at night, and the he dismisses the nightingale's words. The bird returns the following day with the same prediction, which she also reports to her father the same incident, and the man questions his daughter whether one can understand the birds. Regardless, the man asks his daughter to prepare, for they are leaving to her aunt's house. On the road, the girl feels tired, so they stop to rest and eat. The man takes out a piece of bread, but it becomes stuck in the man's throat, so the girl rushes to find water nearby. She finds a fort with a pool inside, fills her jug with water, but cannot leave the fort. She cries for a bit, then checks the seven rooms in the fort, finding in the last room a seventy-year-old corpse with needles all over him. The girl sits by the corpse for a while. Suddenly, a caravan's bells are heard outside and the girl buys a concubine as companion, whom she ropes up to the fort. The girl asks the concubine to remove the needles while she goes to make ablutions and pray, but not to pick the needles on the corpse's nose. While the girl is away, the concubine removes all needles from the corpse, which sneezes and sits up. The "corpse" marries the concubine as his false saviour and makes the old man's daughter their concubine. One day, the "corpse" goes to the city to buy clothes for the false saviour and asks the old man's daughter which gifts he can procure for her; she asks for a patience stone and a black-handled knife. He finds a patience stone from a store, but cannot find the black-handles knife. A passerby asks him the reason for his plight, and the "corpse" says he still has to find the specific knife they requested. The passerby directs him to another store and he buys the knife there. The passerby asks the "corpse" the reason why he bought the stone of patience and the knife, and reveals that the "corpse" should watch his person closely, since they plan to enters an oven, tell the story to the stone and kill herself. The "corpse" returns home and gives the old man's daughter the stone and the knife, so she enters an oven, covers the top and begins to pour out the woes from the beginning, as the "corpse" listens to it closely. After telling the story, the old man's daughter asks her objects if she should stab him or herself. The "corpse" interrupts her, after learning the truth, and takes the old man's daughter out of the oven. He confronts the concubine, his false saviour, whether she wants a loaf of barley or a bīdāw horse (which means a racehorse). The concubine wants the horse to ride on mountains and deserts, but she is tied to one that is let loose until she is torn to pieces. The concubine's skull is dowsed with silver and made into a glass, and the "corpse" marries the old man's daughter. According to Dorson, two more variants of the tale were collected in Afghanistan, all from female informants in Tawberyan. Dorson interpreted the tale as a woman expressing her dissatisfactions in a male-dominated world.

==== Uyghur people ====
In a tale collected in Kashgar from a female informant named Rabbi Khan, and translated as The tale of the wife of the dead young man, a man sends his daughter to school, and the girl's teacher greets her calling her "wife of a dead man". The girl tells her father about it, who confronts the teacher about it, and the teacher says it came from a book. One day, when the girl is going to school, she feels thirsty and finds a courtyard with a water channel. She enters the courtyard, drinks some of the water and tries to leave the place, but the gates are firmly locked. She cries for not being able to leave, but soon investigates the place and finds a house there, with a handsome young man lying on a bed. She reads a letter attached to the body's forehead saying that whoever fans the man for forty days and nights shall marry him. The girl decides to do as the letter instructed, and fans the body nonstop for thirty-nine days. On the fortieth day, she begins to feel tired, and goes to a roof. She spots a woman in the distance combing her hair, and calls her in to the house, then places the woman next to the man's body to cover for her while she goes to wash herself and say her prayers. When the girl returns, the dead man has returned to life and staying beside the woman she brought in, and the girl admonishes herself that her efforts were in vain. The dead man takes the woman as his wife. After years, the man decides to go to the bazaar, and asks his wife about what gifts he can bring her; she asks for silk, earrings, slippers and socks. The man goes to the bazaar and finds the girl on the road, then asks her what he can bring her; the girl asks for a sangil-sungul-stone. The man buys the gifts for the woman, but cannot find the sangil-sungul-stone. At last he enters a shop and the vendor says he has the stone, but warns the man that it is a rare and dangerous gift: whomever it is for, the person will dip the stone in water and tell its woes to it; the stone will swell and break, and the man related to the person's woes will die. Still, the man buys the stone, returns home and gifts it to the girl. At night, the girl lights up her house and places the stone in a cup of water, telling her woes to it. The man remembers the vendor's words and rushes to the girl's house, where she is telling her woes to the sangil-sungul-stone. The man quickly breaks down the door and removes the stone from the water, just moments before it breaks. The man confronts the girl about the events surrounding his revival and comforts her, then expels the woman he married, since she only fanned him for a single day, and takes the girl who fanned him for thirty-nine days. They celebrate their marriage in a forty days and forty nights celebration. According to Gunnar Jarring, the narrator informed that the tale was "usually" told among women and young girls, not men.

== See also ==
- Pentamerone
- The Lord of Lorn and the False Steward
- The Goose Girl
- The Young Slave
- The Maiden with the Rose on her Forehead
- The Bay-Tree Maiden
- Sleeping Beauty
- The Dead Prince and the Talking Doll
- Kajalrekha (Bengali folk ballad)
- Life's Secret
- A Dead Husband
- The Patience Stone (film)
