= Folk-Tales of Bengal =

1883 story collection by Lal Behari Dey

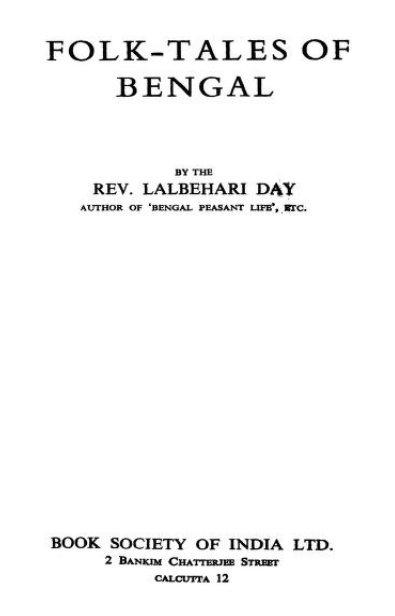
- Title page for Folk-Tales of Bengal (1883)
- Author: Lal Behari Day
- Publication date: 1883

Folk-Tales of Bengal is a collection of folk tales and fairy tales of Bengal written by Lal Behari Dey. The book was published in 1883. The illustrations by Warwick Goble were added in 1912. All these stories were passed from generation to generation for centuries.

== Stories ==
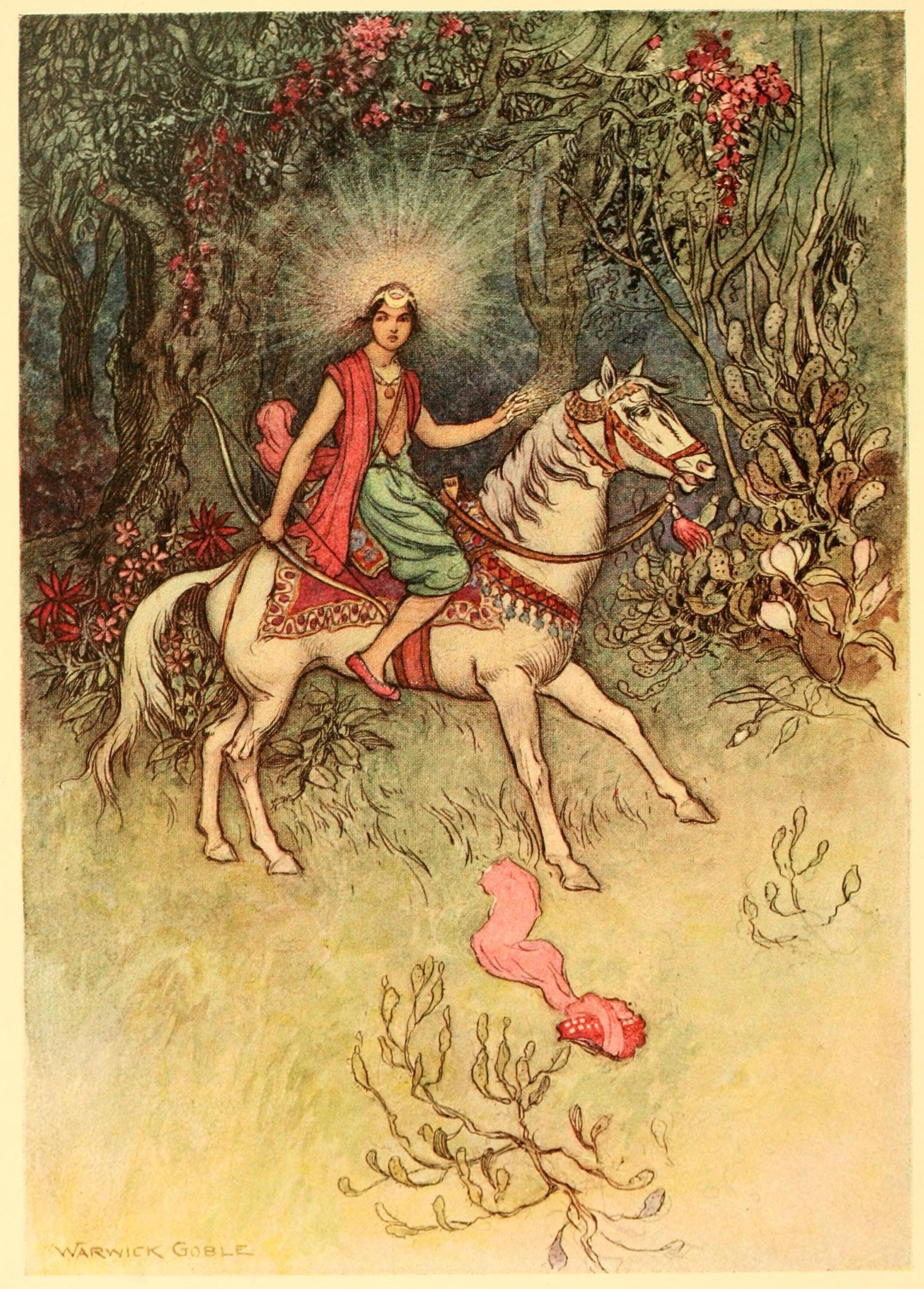
Illustration to Folk-Tales of Bengal by Warwick Goble

This list represents the 1912 Contents (page xi) that is displayed in small caps.

1. Life's Secret
2. Phakir Chand
3. The Indigent Brahman
4. The Story of the Rakshasas
5. The Story of Swet-Basanta
6. The Evil Eye of Sani
7. The Boy whom Seven Mothers suckled
8. The Story of Prince Sobur
9. The Origin of Opium
10. Strike but Hear
11. The Adventures of Two Thieves and of their Sons
12. The Ghost-Brahman
13. The Man who wished to be Perfect
14. A Ghostly Wife
15. The Story of a Brahmadaitya
16. The Story of a Hiraman
17. The Origin of Rubies
18. The Match-making Jackal
19. The Boy with the Moon on his Forehead
20. The Ghost who was Afraid of being Bagged
21. The Field of Bones
22. The Bald Wife
