= Praphulladatta Goswami =

Author (b. 191, d. 1994)

- Born: 1919
- Died: 1994 (aged 74–75)
- Citizenship: Indian
- Occupation: Poet
- Writing career
- Language: Assamese

Praphulladatta Goswami (1919–1994) was an Assamese author of more than 46 novels, including Shesh Kot (Where Does It End, 1948) and Kesa Pator Kapani (The Trembling of New Leaves, 1952).
