= Lal Behari Day =

Bengali writer and journalist

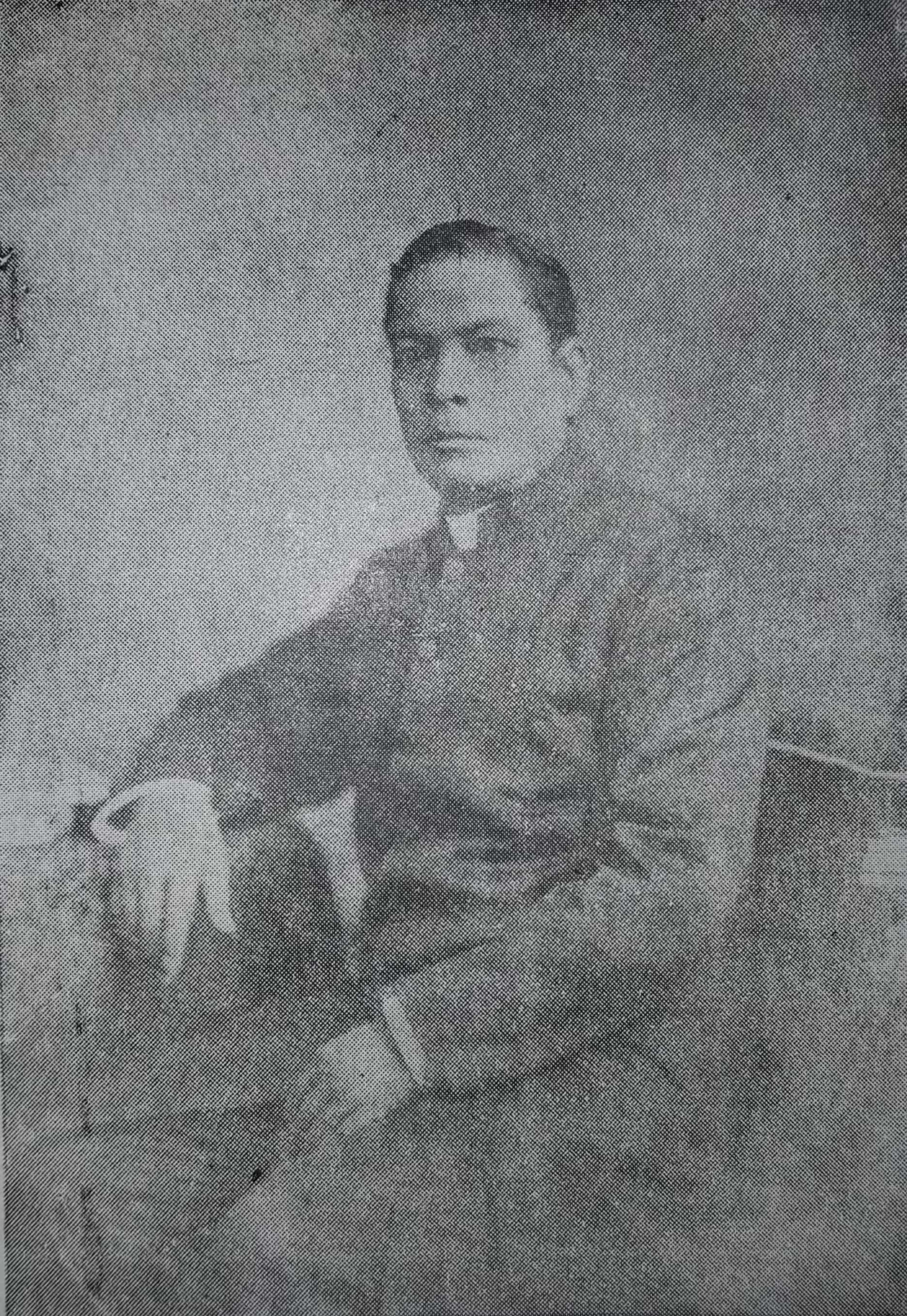
- Lal Behari Day, before 1892
- Born: Lal Behari Dey Mondal; 18 December 1824; Sonapalasi, Bardhaman, Bengal Presidency, British India
- Died: 28 October 1892 (aged 67); Calcutta, Bengal Presidency, British India

Reverend Lal Behari Day (also Dey, 18 December 1824 – 28 October 1894) was an Indian writer and journalist, who converted to Christianity, and became a Christian missionary himself.

== Biography ==
Lal Behari Dey was born on 18 December 1824 to a Bengali Suvarna Banik caste family at Sonapalasi near Bardhaman. His father Radhakanta Dey Mondal was a small bill broker in Kolkata. After primary education in the village school he came to Calcutta with his father and was admitted to Reverend Alexander Duff's General Assembly Institution, where he studied from 1834 to 1844. (Duff's Institution is now the Scottish Church Collegiate School; he was one of the first five boys admitted by Duff.) Under Duff's tutelage he formally embraced Christianity on 2 July 1843. In 1842, a year before his baptism he had published a tract, The Falsity of the Hindu Religion, which had won a prize for the best essay from a local Christian society.

From 1855 to 1867 Lal Behari was a missionary and minister of the Free Church of Scotland. From 1867 to 1889 he worked as professor of English in Government-administered colleges at Berhampore and Hooghly. After having served in several churches in the prime of his career, he joined the Berhampore Collegiate School as Principal in 1867. Later he became Professor of English and Mental and Moral Philosophy in Hooghly Mohsin College of the University of Calcutta and stayed with it from 1872 to 1888. Being a devout Christian but pro-British Raj, he protested against any discrimination practised by the ruling class against the natives.

Lalbehari Dey was known for his profound knowledge of the English language and literature. During his work at Burdwan he saw rural life closely and this experience was drawn upon to Bengal Peasant Life (1874). At this time landlord-tenant relations had greatly deteriorated, and there was peasant unrest in various parts of Bengal. Bengal Peasant Life explains the reasons for this situation. Lalbehari was against the zamindari system and he may be called the first man to investigate and report the actual problems of the depressed classes under the operation of the permanent settlement and suggest remedies towards solving the problem. His contemporaries Bankim Chandra Chattopadhyay, Peary Chand Mitra and Dinabandhu Mitra, also wrote powerfully about peasants and depressed class's problems. Their opinions greatly influenced the report of the Rent Commission of 1880 which led to the enactment of the famous bengal tenancy act of 1885, which has been termed as the Magna Carta of peasant rights in Bengal.

Rev. Lalbehari also wrote two novels, Chandramukhi, A Tale of Bengali Life (1859) and Govinda Samanta, which portray the suffering of peasants under the zamindari system. In 1874 his Govinda Samanta won the prize of Rs 500 offered by Baboo Joy Kissen Mookerjea of Uttarpara, one of the most enlightened zamindars in Bengal, for the best novel, written either in Bengali or in English, illustrating the "Social and Domestic Life of the Rural Population and Working Classes of Bengal". Charles Darwin wrote a letter on 18 April 1881 to the publishers saying,

"I see that the Reverend Lal Behari Day is Editor of the Bengal Magazine and I shall be glad if you would tell him with my compliments how much pleasure and instruction I derived from reading a few years ago, this novel, Govinda Samanta."

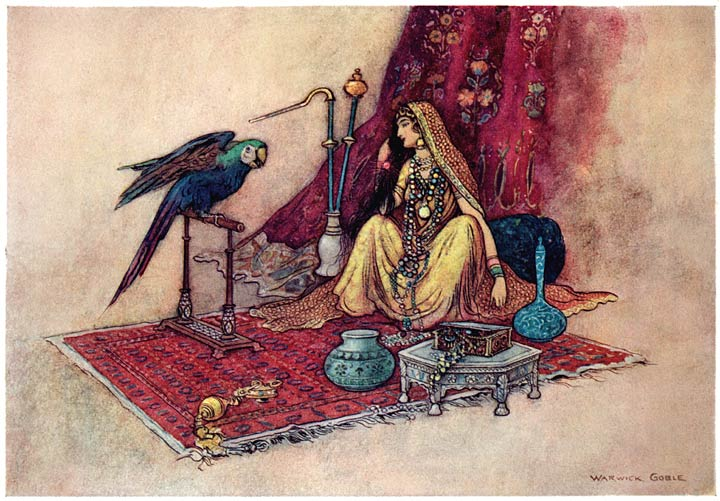
Illustration to Folk-Tales of Bengal by Warwick Goble

Lalbehari Dey was perhaps the first collector of Bengali fairy tales and compiled Folk-Tales of Bengal (1875). This scholarly work is a path-breaking effort in cataloguing the cultural heritage of rural Bengal. This compilation not only preserved folk tales that might otherwise have been lost, but also paved the way for the modern study of Folk literature.

Lalbehari was also strong advocate of Bengali medium and vernacular education. He made it a policy to publish features on the importance of education in the vernaculars in Arunodaya (1875), a fortnightly journal published and edited by him. These views were given due attention by Hunter Commission (1882), education commission for popularizing education among depressed classes.

He was also the editor of three English magazines, Indian Reformer (1861), Friday Review (1866) and Bengal Magazine (1872). Apart from writing in these magazines, Lal Behari also contributed articles to Calcutta Review and Hindu Patriot. He was a member of many associations like the Bethune Society and the Bengal Social Science Association.

He was made a Fellow of the University of Calcutta from 1877.

Lal Behari Day died on 28 October 1894, at Calcutta.
