= The Maiden with the Rose on her Forehead =

The Maiden with the Rose on her Forehead is a Portuguese fairy tale collected by Consiglieri Pedroso in Portuguese Folk-Tales.

== Synopsis ==
A prince had a garden, which he allowed no one to tend but himself. One day, he had to go to war; his sister promised to look after it. She remained in the garden day and night and became pregnant. Ashamed of herself, she gave birth to her daughter, who had a rose on her forehead, and raised her secretly, sending her to school with directions to never let anyone know who she was. The prince saw her at school, and she made a shirt for him but never revealed anything. One day, the children played with cherry pits, and one fell on the girl; her mother thought she had revealed herself, killed her, and put the body in an iron chest in a room. Her grief and guilt killed her; before she died, she gave her brother the key and forbade him to enter.

The prince married and forbade his wife to enter the room. His mother-in-law encouraged her daughter, and they went in and found the girl in the iron chest, sewing. Jealous, they burned her all over with a hot iron and told the prince that she was a mulatta they had bought to run errands.

When the prince went to the fair, he asked her what she wanted; she asked for a talisman. When he brought it, he was curious and hid to learn what she would do; she poured out her story to the talisman, and the prince burned his wife and mother-in-law as they had burned his niece and turned them out of his home.

== Analysis ==
Portuguese scholar Isabel Cárdigos classified the tale in the Portuguese Folktale Catalogue as type 438, Portuguese: A Filha da Rosa, lit. 'The Daughter of the Rose', being its only variant. A similar type is attested in the Spanish Folktale Catalogue established by Hispanists Julio Camarena and Maxime Chevalier (fr), under a new tale type, termed 438, La Hija de la Rosa. Spanish variants are recorded in Mallorca (2 tales), and Catalonia (1 tale).

== See also ==
- The Young Slave
- The Sleeping Prince (fairy tale)
- The Dead Prince and the Talking Doll

== Bibliography ==
- Cardigos, Isabel (2007). "Em Busca Do Belo Adormecido No Mundo Dos Contos Tradicionais". In: Povos E Culturas, n. 11 (Janeiro), 22-23. https://doi.org/10.34632/povoseculturas.2007.8780. (In Portuguese)
- Goldberg, Christine. "The Knife of Death and the Stone of Patience". In: E.L.O.: Estudos de Literatura Oral. Spring 1995. pp. 103-117
