= Syair Bidasari =

Malay poem

The English version of the poem, 1901

The Syair Bidasari is a Malay poem popular across Southeast Asia. Surviving manuscripts date to the early 19th century, and the story may be older. Following a beautiful maiden who falls into a deathlike sleep during the day, it has been compared to the European fairy tales of Snow White and Sleeping Beauty.

== Plot ==
A king and his pregnant wife flee an attack by a garuda. The queen gives birth along the way. Due to the danger, they place their newborn daughter in a boat on a riverbank and leave her there. A merchant finds the infant and raises her as his own, naming her Bidasari. He and his wife place her soul into a small fish, which they hide within a casket in a pond in their garden. Bidasari grows into a beautiful girl.

Djouhan Mengindra, Sultan of Indrapura, is married to the beautiful but vain Lila Sari. Lila Sari becomes consumed with worry that she'll be replaced as his favorite wife. She sends four servants to seek out any girl more beautiful than her, leading to the discovery of Bidasari. She commands that Bidasari be brought to her, claiming that she will treat her like an adopted daughter. Her parents reluctantly allow her to go. When Bidasari arrives, the Queen locks her up and beats her. The Queen wants to kill her but is thwarted until the despondent Bidasari – who believes her parents have abandoned her – tells her about the fish containing her soul. If she removes the fish from the water during the day, Bidasari will die. The Queen obtains the fish and wears it on a ribbon around her neck, and Bidasari swoons. Triumphant, the Queen has her body sent home. Her father hopes to revive her using the fish, only to discover that it’s been stolen. At midnight, Bidasari returns to life and tells her parents what happened, but she “dies” again at dawn. Her parents, terrified of the queen, build a refuge in the wilderness which they name Pengtipourlara. There they leave Bidasari alone for her safety, visiting regularly with supplies.

King Djouhan dreams about the Moon falling to Earth. When told that the dream means he will find a beautiful and deserving wife, he denies that anyone could ever equal Lila Sari. He goes on a hunting trip, only for his servants to discover Bidasari's refuge. The King orders them to break open the gates, enters alone and finds the dead Bidasari. He is struck by her beauty, and tries unsuccessfully to wake her. He returns again the next day, and stays until night when she awakes.

Bidasari is alarmed, but the King declares his love, explains who he is and states his wish to marry her. Bidasari tells him about the Queen, before swooning again as dawn approaches. He returns home, where he notices the fish on the Queen’s necklace and realizes that Bidasari was telling the truth. He takes the fish and at that moment, Bidasari is fully revived. The King returns and marries her in a magnificent wedding, building her a new palace. He invites Lila Sari to make amends with Bidasari, but she insults them both until he leaves in anger.

Meanwhile, Bidasari’s biological parents are once again reigning in their kingdom. Her brother learns of her story and decides to search for her. He successfully tracks her down and meets her foster family and husband. Bidasari is initially conflicted, wondering why her parents abandoned her, but the prince explains their story, and they arrange for a family reunion on the isle of Nousa Antara. There, the prince goes on a hunting trip which leads him to a palace. He fights an Ifrid and rescues a maiden named Princess Mendoudari, whom he brings back as his bride. The royal families are overjoyed when he returns, having thought him lost. With the celebrations coming to an end, they return to their kingdoms to live in peace and prosperity, with Bidasari’s story spread far and wide. Lila Sari is left alone in solitude to repent.

== History ==
Syair Bidasari is a romantic syair, part of a genre popular in the 18th and 19th centuries. It was translated into other languages such as English, French, German and Russian. Julian Millie found that it was known across Southeast Asia from the Minangkabau region of Indonesia to the island of Mindanao.

The exact location of origin is unknown, and the date is uncertain, except that it was in circulation before the early 1800s, with the earliest mention of the title from 1807 and the earliest extant manuscript dated 1814. A similar work, the Syair Ken Tambuhan, is dated 1791 and was theorized to have been composed no earlier than 1650. The story may have also existed in a prose form known as hikayat, with Dr. J. Leyden mentioning the "Hikaiat Bida Sari" in 1807.

== Analysis ==
Malaysian literary scholar Siti Hawa Salleh identified this as one of the hikayat in syair form with both Indian and Middle Eastern elements, alongside Syair Siti Zubaidah and Syair Dandan Setia. The poem's intricate language has made it difficult to translate into English with full accuracy.

== Adaptations ==
- Bidasari (1965 film)
- Bidasari (play)

== See also ==
- Princess Aubergine
