= Laura Gonzenbach =

Swiss fairy tale collector in Sicilia (1842–1878)

Laura Gonzenbach (1842–1878) was a fairy-tale collector of Swiss-German origins, active in Sicily, who collected fairy tales told orally in the local dialects.

Gonzenbach was born in Messina, to a Swiss German-speaking mercantile family and community. Her sister, Magdalena, founded the first school for girls in Messina, the Istituto Gonzenbach. Her important work as a folklorist was thoroughly researched by Luisa Rubini in Fiabe e mercanti in Sicilia. La raccolta di Laura Gonzenbach. La comunità di lingua tedesca a Messina nell’Ottocento (1998). Gonzenbach was a scrupulous avant-garde scholar of popular traditions. She was well educated, mastered several languages and became well known for the Italian folklore she gathered mainly from female informants. After the prompting of Otto Hartwig for material to append to a historical survey of the country, she produced what would become an important two-volume collection in Standard German, Sicilianische Märchen (Sicilian folk-tales), published in 1870. Her seminal anthology contained tales told verbally by peasants and other members of the working classes; the assemblage is one of the few major collections of the nineteenth century to be compiled by a woman.
