= Mauro Maur =

Italian trumpeter and composer (born 1958)

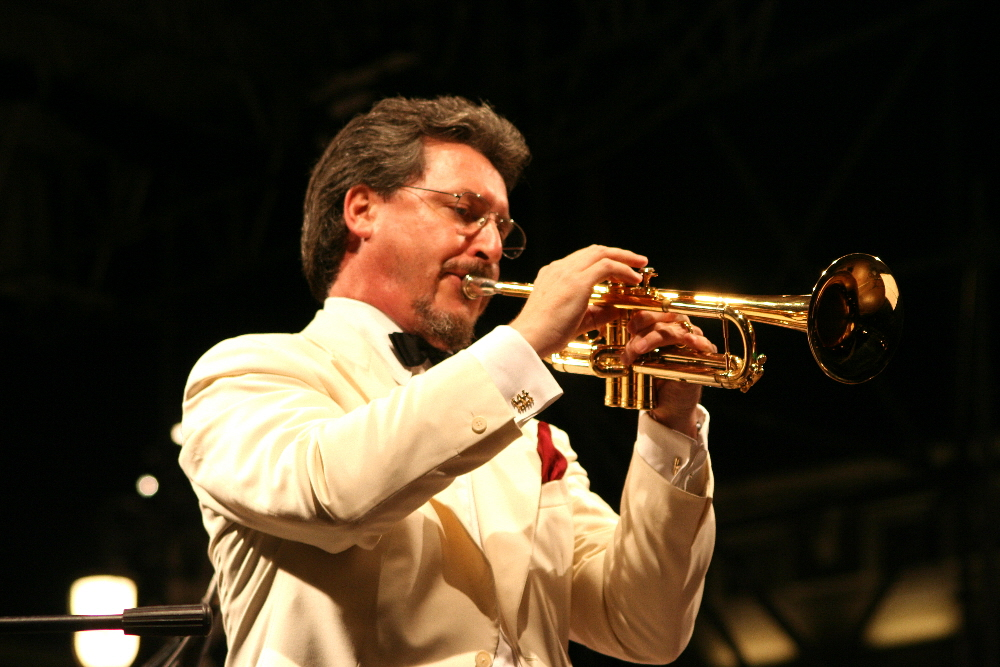

Background information
- Born: 8 August 1958 (age 68); Trieste, Italy
- Genres: Classical; cinema; crossover
- Occupations: Composer; trumpeter; pedagogue
- Labels: Sony Classical; Columbia; Denon; RCA Italiana; JVC Japan
- Spouse: Françoise de Clossey

Mauro Maur, OMRI (born 8 August 1958) is an Italian trumpeter and composer. He has collaborated alongside musicians such as Ennio Morricone, Placido Domingo, Uto Ughi, Riccardo Muti, Leonard Bernstein, Seiji Ozawa, and Pierre Boulez.

== Biography ==
First Trumpet for the Orchestra of the Opera House in Rome from 1985 to 2009, Mauro Maur has appeared on several popular television shows such as: Maurizio Costanzo Show, Tappeto Volante, La Notte di Marzullo, on radio shows and he has recorded for BMG Ariola, RCA, Sony Columbia and Denon. Trumpet player, conductor and composer for the theater, the television as well as for the cinema, Mauro Maur has played with musicians such as Gloria Gaynor, Plácido Domingo and the Solisti Veneti from Claudio Scimone.

Mauro Maur graduated in Trieste at a very young age. In 1975, he successfully passed the admission audition at the Conservatoire de Paris where he perfected his studies with Pierre Thibaud. While he was still a pupil of the Conservatory, he won the audition of first trumpet for the Toulouse National Orchestra (directed by Michel Plasson) and with them took part in several competitions around the world. He began in France, at the age of 18, to be in demand as soloist from famous organists, from chamber orchestras, to be present in the most important festivals. He completed a cycle of studies to the Northwestern University in Chicago with Adolph Herseth, Vincent Cichowicz and Arnold Jacobs.

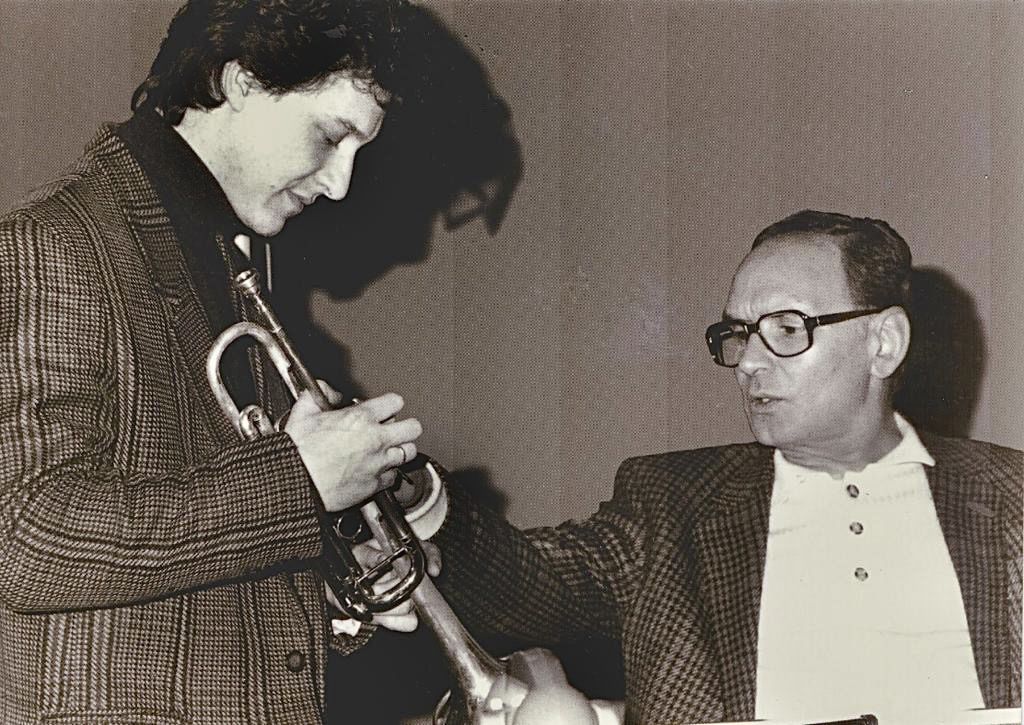
Maur (left) and Ennio Morricone in the recording studio "Forum Music Village", c. 1970s

Mauro Maur was a gold medalist at the International Competition of Toulon in 1981, a recipient of the First Prize at the Superior National Conservatory of Paris Competition in 1982 and a winner of several competitions in Lille and at the Opera House in Rome, the Teatro di San Carlo in Naples and the Accademia Nazionale di Santa Cecilia. Furthermore, he has played in prestigious concert's halls around the world such as Carnegie Hall of New York, Festspiele Salzburg, Megaron Athens, Seoul Arts Center.

Composers such as Morricone, Theodorakis, Bussotti, Clementi, Vlad, Ronchetti, Dashow, Flavio Emilio Scogna, Fabrizio De Rossi Re have dedicated several musical compositions to Mauro Maur. Since 1985, he has been the First Trumpet for the Orchestra of the Opera House in Rome. With regards to the cinema and television industries, Mauro Maur has played in more than 100 films on sound tracks composed by Morricone, Piovani, Ortolani, Goldsmith and Delerue.

Mauro Maur is coach instructor for the trumpets of The Orchestra of the Americas. He has given masterclasses at the conservatories of Palermo, Florence, Montefiascone, Portogruaro, and Trieste, at the MusicaRiva Festival in Trentino, at McGill University in Montreal, and in Moscow at the Tchaikovsky Conservatory. He has been professor of the Superior studies in trumpet at the Santa Cecilia Conservatory in Rome.

In 2008, Mauro Maur received the Price Oder 2008 for the career and in 2009, he received the prestigious "Sigillo Trecentesco", the highest distinction of the city of Trieste.

At the request of Italian President of the Council of Ministers, Mauro Maur was given the honorary distinction of Cavaliere (Knight) dell'Ordine "al Merito della Repubblica Italiana". The President of the Italian Republic can bestow “honours of the Republic” on persons who have a particular merit in regard to the nation.

== Association with Ennio Morricone ==
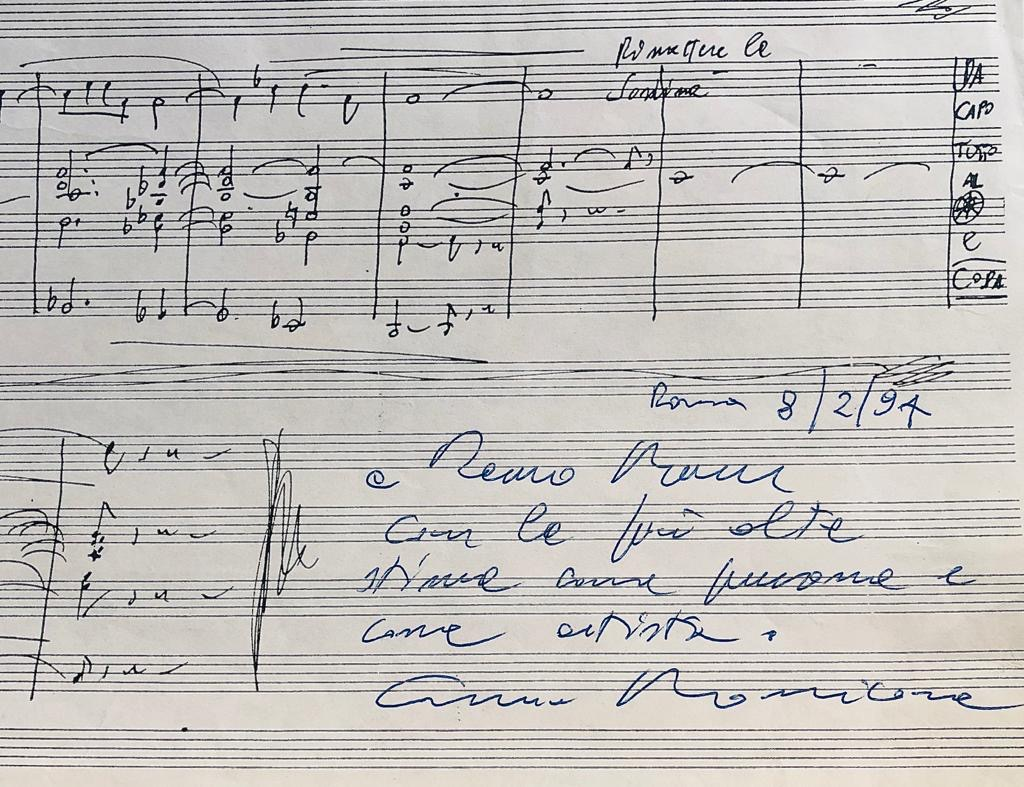
Personal Dedicace from Ennio Morricone to Mauro Maur: "To Mauro Maur with the highest esteem as a person and as an artist. Ennio Morricone" (A Mauro Maur con la più alta stima come persona e come artista. Ennio Morricone)

Mauro Maur has collaborated with Ennio Morricone for more than 20 years, recording the solos of the films under the direction of the Maestro Morricone in the historic "Forum Studios" located in Piazza Euclide in Rome. Linked by a deep friendship, Morricone dedicated many solos of his films in concert form and also his Concerto for trumpet and orchestra "Ut" to Mauro Maur who played the premier and recorded it for BMG Ariola. Mauro Maur has also been mentioned several times in Maestro Morricone's autobiography and received from Morricone passionate dedicaces on the scores after recording them. The trumpet that Sergio Leone used for the Spaghetti-western films was donated by Ennio Morricone to Mauro Maur.

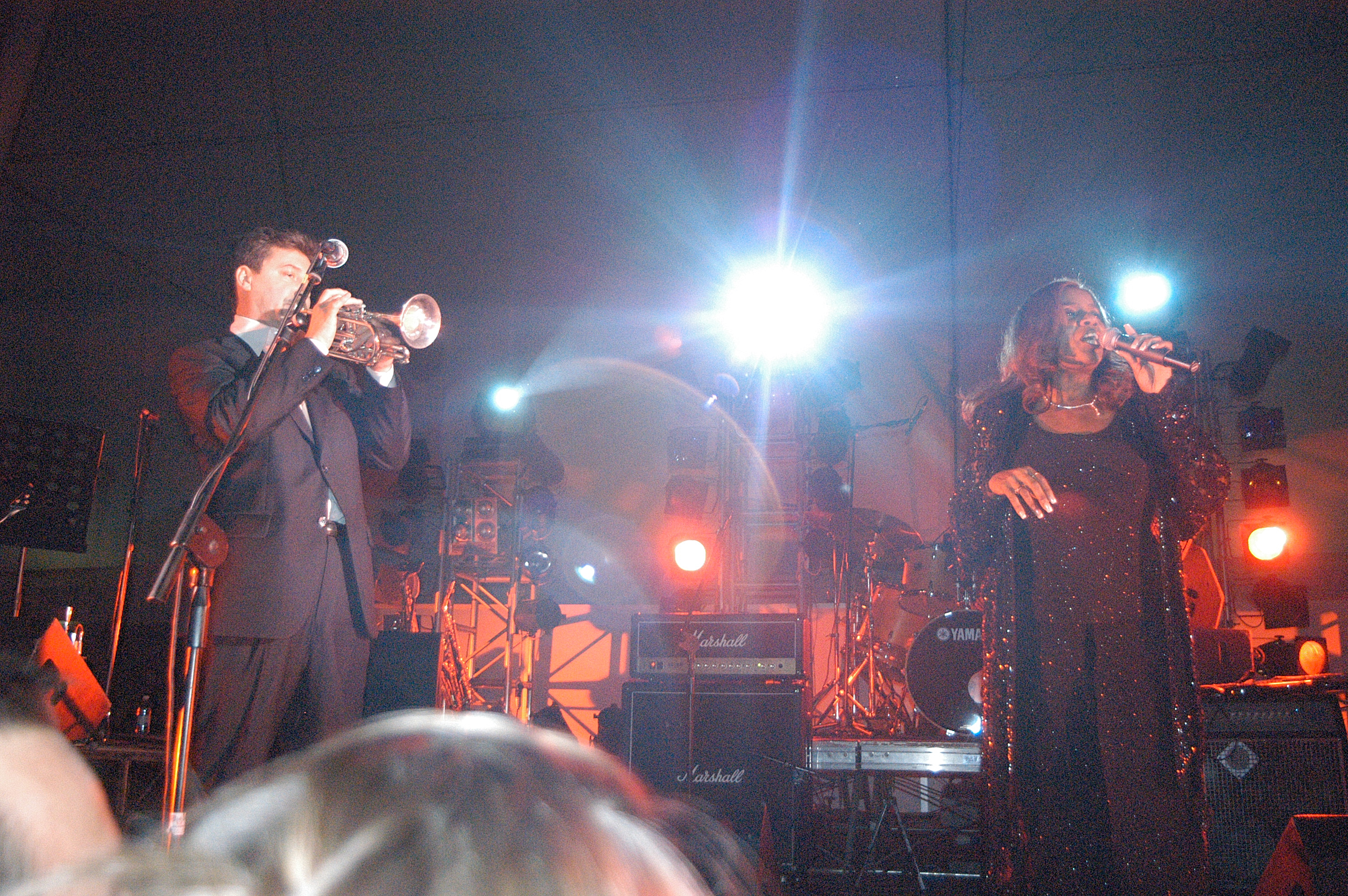
Mauro Maur & Gloria Gaynor during a show

== Other collaborations ==
He has played with various famous French orchestras (Opera, National, Radio) composed of prestigious groups such as L'Ars Nova, Les Solistes de France, Ircam, and accompanied of great soloists such as Hendricks, Isoir, Thibaud. He has also been directed by great masters such as Muti, Bernstein, Ozawa, Boulez, and Maazel.

Mauro Maur was a friend of Federico Fellini and Giulietta Masina and he recorded the music for the last three Fellini films. He played Nino Rota's music at their respective funerals in Rome.

== Honours ==

Knight: Cavaliere Ordine al Merito della Repubblica Italiana: 2008

Officer: Ufficiale Ordine al Merito della Repubblica Italiana: 2018

Honor of "Meritorious Member" of the "International Police Association": 2022

== Compositions dedicated to Mauro Maur ==
- E. Morricone: Ut (1991) for trumpet and orchestra
- E. Morricone:Quarto Concerto (1993) for organ, two trumpets, two trombones and orchestra
- M. Théodorakis:Adagio for trumpet and string orchestra
- S. Bussotti: Solfeggio in re della Regina for piccolo trumpet
- F. Grillo: Sol e Eius Umbra (1981) for trumpet and doublebass
- F. Mannino: Atmosfere delle Notti Bianche di S. Pietroburgo (1987) op. 279 for trumpet and orchestra
- F. Mannino: Concerto op. 324 (1990) for trumpet and strings
- A. D'Antò: Alone away (1988) for solo trumpet
- W. Dalla Vecchia: Ouverture for trumpet and string orchestra
- R. Gervasio: Variazioni sulla "Preghiera del Mose" di Rossini for trumpet and organ
- G. Farace: Cuor di Pagliaccio for flugelhorn and saxophones quartet
- V. Mortari: Divertimento (1990) for trumpet and cello
- E. Zanoni: Cadencia y Seguidilla for trumpet and piano
- E. Zanoni: Sarabande Lyrique for trumpet and piano
- L. Ronchetti: Deserti for trumpet and tape
- G. Baldi: The Ancient City (1992–93) for seven trumpets, piano and percussions
- F.E. Scogna: Trame (1993) for solo trumpet
- R. Vlad: Melodie e Squilli (1993) for trumpet and piano
- J. Dashow: Morfologie (1993) for trumpet and computer
- E. Chasalow: Out of Joint (1994) for trumpet and electronic sounds
- F. de Rossi Re: Quarto Nero for trumpet and organ
- D. Nicolau: Rug Maur Short Music op. 89 for three trumpets and percussions
- D. Nicolau: Ariette op.72 for solo trumpet
- D. Nicolau: Pathopoiia op.86 (1988) for trumpet and percussions
- R. Chiesa: Kaddish (1998) for solo trumpet
- P. Thilloy: Le Labyrinthe ou Le Chemin de Jerusalem (2000) for trumpet, trombone and string orchestra
- M. Frisina: Hymnus for trumpet and organ
- M. Frisina: Suite Giovanni Paolo II for trumpet and organ
- M. Sofianopulo: Varianti "Dal Tuo Stellato Soglio" (2004) for trumpet and organ
- M. Pagotto: No More Seasons (2009) for trumpet and piano

== Discography ==
- 2019: Il Silenzio, I grandi Successi di Nini Rosso: Mauro Maur soloist JVC Japan
- 2016: Ave Maria: Mauro Maur trumpet soloist, Françoise de Clossey, organ
- 2009: Franco Margola, F. Busoni Chamber Orchestra dir M. Belli, Mauro Maur soloist
- 2008: On the Wings of Love, Solisti Veneti dir. C. Scimone, J.J. Mouret Due Sinfonie per tromba e archi Mauro Maur soloist FABULA CLASSICA #12076-2
- 2003: Concerto per Alberto, omaggio all’arte di Piero Piccioni
- 2001: A. Vivaldi Juditha Triumphans, Solisti Veneti dir. C. Scimone Warner Fonit #8573 85747–2
- 2001:From the Screen to the Stage Rota & Morricone, I Filarmonici Italiani Denon #COCQ 83538
- 1996: Mauro Maur e i suoi Solisti: music of Ennio Morricone et Nino Rota Sony Columbia #COL 485352–2
- 1994: Una Tromba in scena Mauro Maur Iktius Milano #C009P
- 1993: La Tromba Classica Contemporanea : musiche di Ennio Morricone, Flavio Emilio Scogna, Lucia Ronchetti, Aldo Clementi, Fabrizio De Rossi Re, Sylvano Bussotti, Mikis Theodorakis, Roman Vlad, James Dashow BMG #74321-16825-2
- 1993: Torelli: Concerti, Sinfonie e Sonate per Tromba, Archi e Basso Continuo RS-Darpro #6367-07
- 1993: L’Orchestra Classica Contemporanea BMG #74321-17516-2
- 1993: La Bibbia: Abramo: music of Ennio Morricone CGD 450994978–2
- 1993: In the Line of Fire: music of Ennio Morricone Sony #B000008GT8
- 1992: City of the Joy: music of Ennio Morricone EPIC SOUNDTRAX #EK 52750
- 1991: Voyage of Terror: music of Ennio Morricone BMG Ariola #OST 101
- 1989: Improvviso dell'Angelo: Mauro Maur trumpet Luigi Celeghin organ Casa Musicale Bongiovanni
- 1985: Orchestre Champetre 1900: Mauro Maur cornet FR3 #BZ 62004
- 1984: Sonates et Concertos pour trompette: music of Corelli, Manfredini, Torelli, Purcell, Telemann Orch. de Chambre de Picardie dir. J.P. François Mauro Maur soloist Jacinthe #N84.25.001
