= Snow White =

German fairy tale

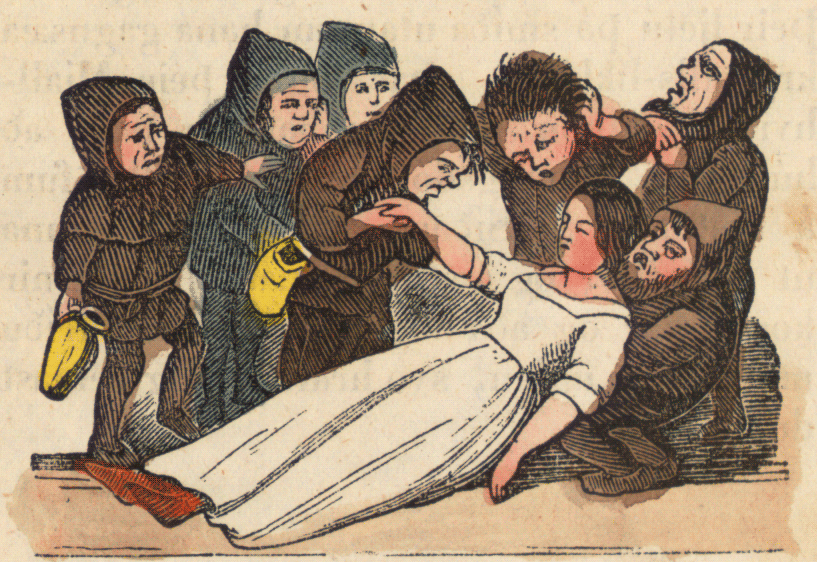
- The seven dwarfs carrying Snow White

Folk tale
- Name: Snow White
- Aarne–Thompson grouping: 709
- Country: Germany
- Origin Date: 1812
- Published in: Grimms' Fairy Tales

"Snow White" is a German fairy tale, first written down in the early 19th century. The Brothers Grimm published it in 1812 in the first edition of their collection Grimms' Fairy Tales, numbered as Tale 53. The original title was Sneewittchen, which is a partial translation from Low German. The modern spelling is Schneewittchen. The Grimms completed their final revision of the story in 1854, which can be found in the 1857 version of Grimms' Fairy Tales. The story was first published in English in 1823 under the title "Snow-Drop", which was also used in other early translations. Occasionally, the title "Little Snow-White" was also used.

The fairy tale features elements such as the magic mirror, the poisoned apple, the glass coffin, and the characters of the Evil Queen and the seven Dwarfs. The seven dwarfs were first given individual names in the 1912 Broadway play Snow White and the Seven Dwarfs and then given different names in Walt Disney's 1937 film Snow White and the Seven Dwarfs. The Grimm story, which is commonly referred to as "Snow White", should not be confused with the story of "Snow-White and Rose-Red" (in German "Schneeweißchen und Rosenrot"), another fairy tale collected by the Brothers Grimm.

In the Aarne–Thompson folklore classification, tales of this kind are grouped together as type 709, Snow White. Others of this kind include "Bella Venezia", "Myrsina", "Nourie Hadig", "Gold-Tree and Silver-Tree", "The Young Slave", and "La petite Toute-Belle".

== Plot ==
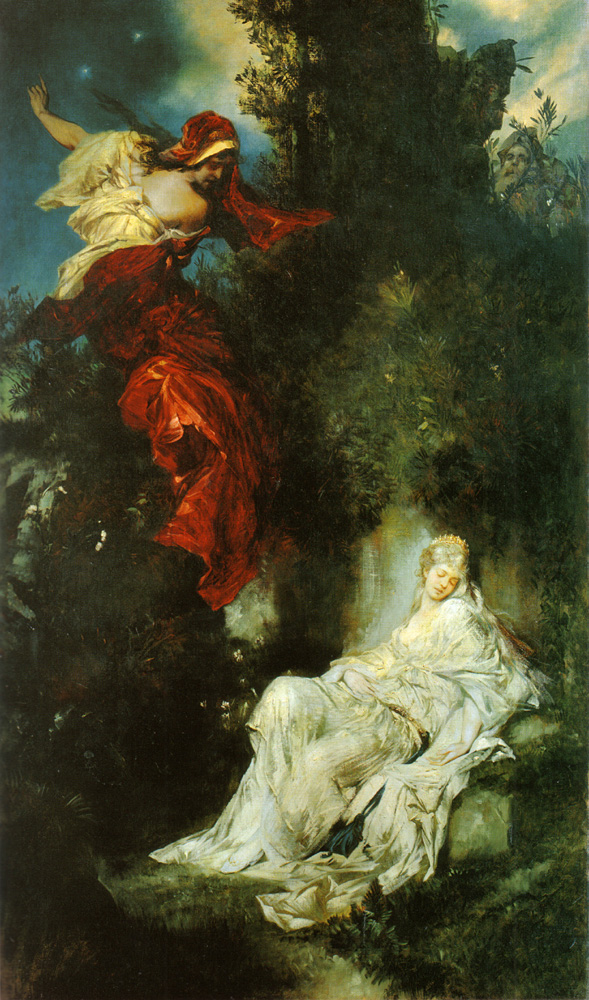
The fable's antagonist the Evil Queen with the protagonist Snow White as depicted in The Sleeping Snow White by Hans Makart (1872)

The following plot is that of the definitive 1857 edition of Grimm's Fairy Tales.

At the beginning of the story, a queen sits sewing at an open window during a winter snowfall when she pricks her finger with her needle, causing three drops of blood to drip onto the freshly fallen snow on the black window sill. Then she says to herself, "How I wish that I had a daughter who had skin as white as snow, lips as red as blood and hair as black as ebony." Some time later, the queen dies giving birth to a baby daughter whom she names Snow White.

A year later, Snow White's father the king marries again. His new wife is very beautiful, but a vain and wicked woman who practices witchcraft. The new queen possesses a magic mirror which she asks every morning "Mirror mirror on the wall, who is the fairest one of all?" The magic mirror always tells the queen that she is the fairest. The Queen is always pleased with that response because the magic mirror never lies. When Snow White is seven years old, her fairness surpasses that of her stepmother. When the Queen again asks her magic mirror the same question, it tells her that Snow White is the fairest.

This gives the Queen a great shock. She becomes envious, and from that moment on, her heart turns against Snow White, whom the Queen grows to hate increasingly with time. Eventually, she orders a huntsman to take Snow White into the forest and kill her. As proof that Snow White is dead, the Queen also wants him to return with her lungs and liver so she can eat them with salt. The huntsman takes Snow White into the forest. After raising his dagger, the huntsman finds himself unable to kill her. When Snow White learns of her stepmother's plan and tearfully begs the huntsman "Spare me this mockery of justice! I will run away into the forest and never come home again!" After seeing the tears in the princess's eyes, the huntsman reluctantly agrees to spare Snow White and brings the Queen a boar's lungs and liver instead. Believing them to be Snow White's lungs and liver, the queen has the royal cook roast them with salt and eats them.

After wandering through the forest for hours, Snow White discovers a tiny cottage belonging to a group of seven dwarfs. Since no one is at home, she eats some of the tiny meals, drinks some of their wine, and then tests all the beds. Finally, the last bed is comfortable enough for her, and she falls asleep. When the seven dwarfs return home, they immediately become aware that there has been a burglar in their house because everything in their home is in disorder. Prowling about frantically, they head upstairs and discover the sleeping Snow White. She wakes up and explains to them about her stepmother's attempt to kill her and the seven dwarfs take pity on her and let her stay with them in exchange for a job as a housemaid. They warn her to be careful when alone at home and to let no one in while they are working in the mountains.

Meanwhile, the queen still believes she got rid of Snow White and asks her magic mirror once again "Mirror mirror on the wall, who now is the fairest one of all?" The magic mirror tells her that not only is Snow White still the fairest in the land, but she is also currently hiding with the dwarfs. The Queen is furious that the huntsman failed to kill Snow White and decides to kill her herself.

First, she appears at the dwarfs' cottage, disguised as an old peddler and offers Snow White a colourful silky laced bodice as a present. The queen laces her up so tightly that Snow White faints. The seven dwarfs return just in time to revive Snow White by loosening the laces. Next, the queen dresses up as a comb seller and convinces Snow White to take a beautiful comb as a present as she strokes Snow White's hair with the poisoned comb. The girl is overcome by the poison from the comb, but is again revived by the dwarfs when they remove the comb from her hair. Finally, the queen disguises herself as a farmer's wife and offers Snow White an apple that is secretly poisoned. Snow White is hesitant to accept it, so the queen cuts the apple in half, eating the white (harmless) half and giving the red poisoned half to Snow White; the girl eagerly takes a bite and then falls into a coma, causing the Queen to think she has finally triumphed. The seven dwarfs unfasten her clothes, comb her hair, and wash her with water and wine, but this time they are unable to revive Snow White, and, assuming that the queen has finally killed her, they place her in a casket as a funeral for her. After three days of mourning, the dwarfs consider burying her, but being still in such good condition as to appear alive, they place her in a glass casket. On it, they inscribe her name in golden letters and note that she is the daughter of a king, then place it on a mountain, where one of the dwarfs stays to stand guard over her, along with some animals. In this way, Snow White remains in the coffin for a long time without decomposing.

Some time later, a prince stumbles upon a seemingly dead Snow White lying in her glass coffin during a hunting trip. After hearing her story from the seven dwarfs, the prince asks them to give him Snow White in exchange for a reward, but they refuse. The prince pleads with them, saying that he can no longer live without her and that he would honor her as the most precious thing in the world. Seeing that his intentions are sincere, the dwarfs agree, and the prince is allowed to take Snow White to her proper resting place back at her father's castle. All of a sudden, while Snow White is being transported, one of the prince's servants trips and loses his balance. This dislodges the piece of the poisoned apple from Snow White's throat, magically reviving her. The Prince is overjoyed by this, and he declares his love for the now alive and well Snow White, who, surprised to meet him face to face, humbly accepts his marriage proposal.

The Queen is also invited to the wedding, and after dressing herself, asks again her magic mirror who is the fairest in the land. The mirror says that the young bride is a thousand times fairer. The furious Queen initially considers not attending the wedding, but, finding no peace, she decides to go and see the bride. Once she arrives, the queen becomes frozen with rage and fear when she finds out that the prince's bride is her stepdaughter, Snow White herself. As punishment for the previous murder attempts of Snow White, the queen is forced to wear a pair of red-hot iron slippers and to dance in them until she drops dead.

Franz Jüttner's illustrations from Sneewittchen (1905)

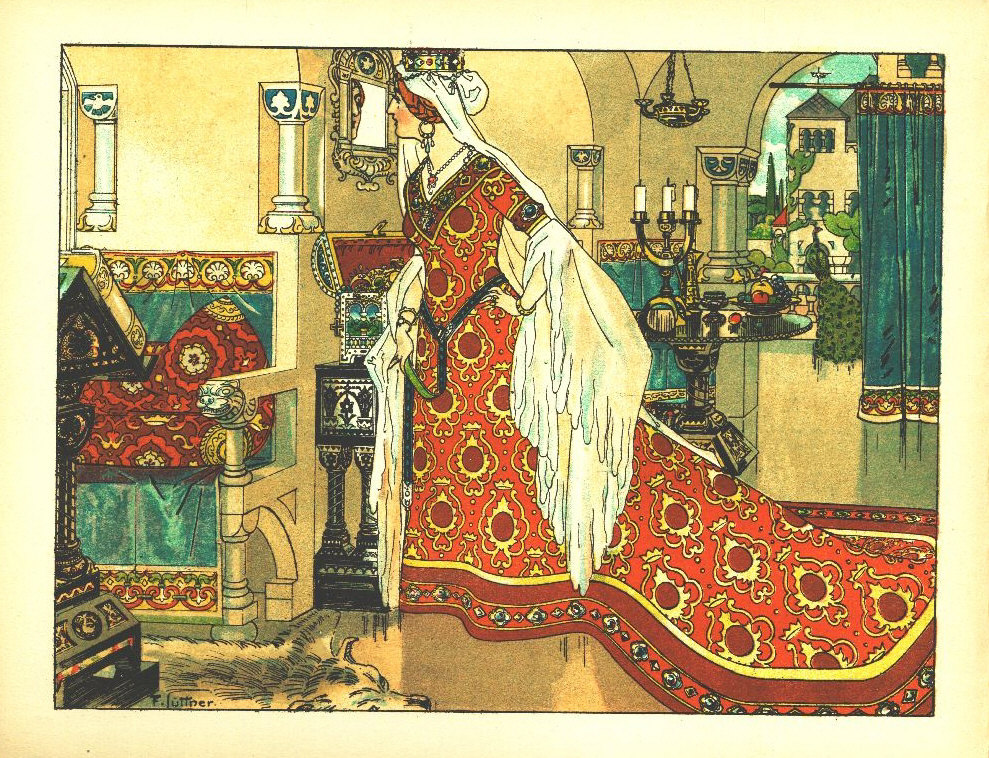
1. The Queen asks the magic mirror

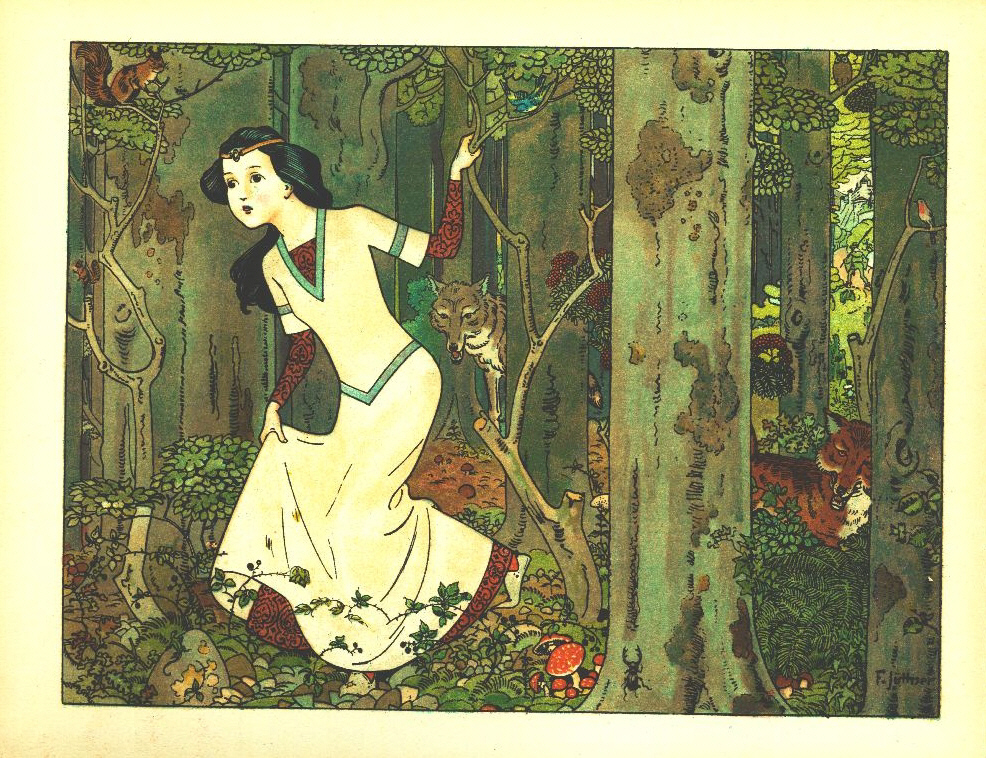
2. Snow White in the forest

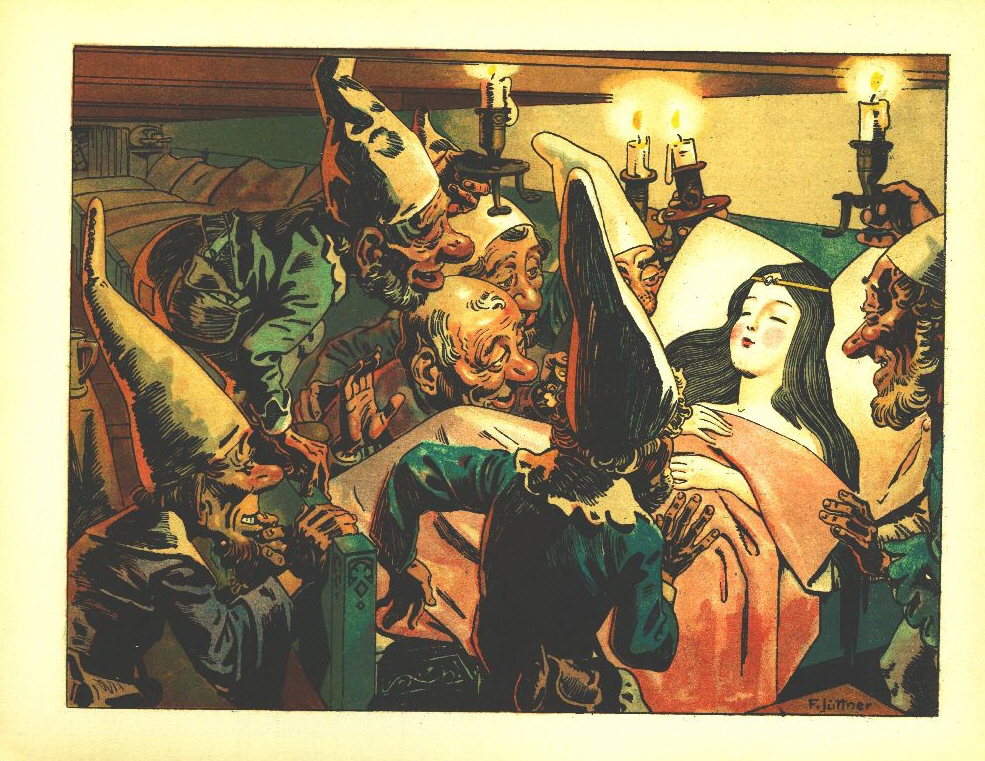
3. The dwarfs find Snow White asleep

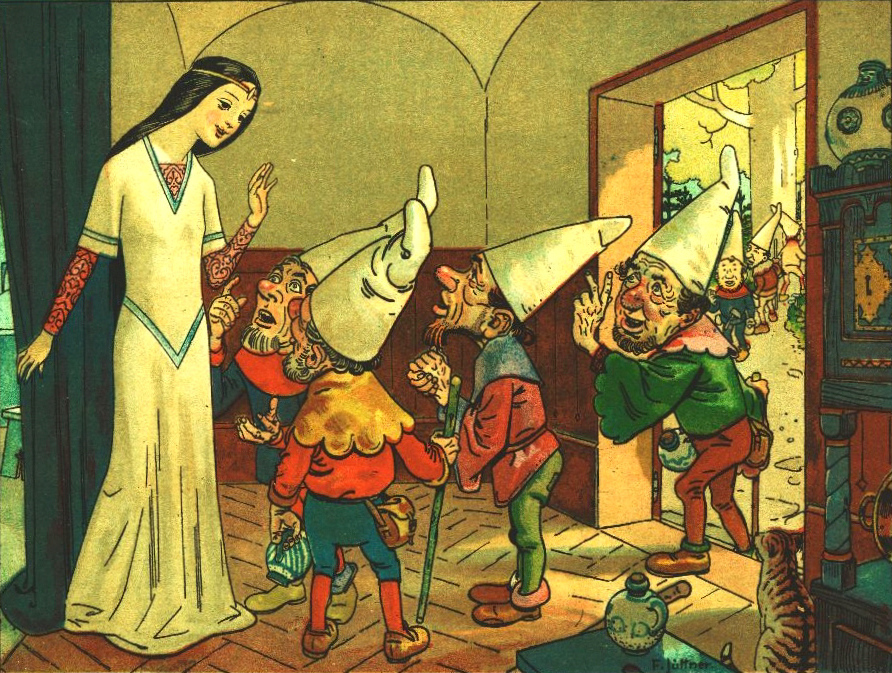
4. The dwarfs leave Snow White in charge

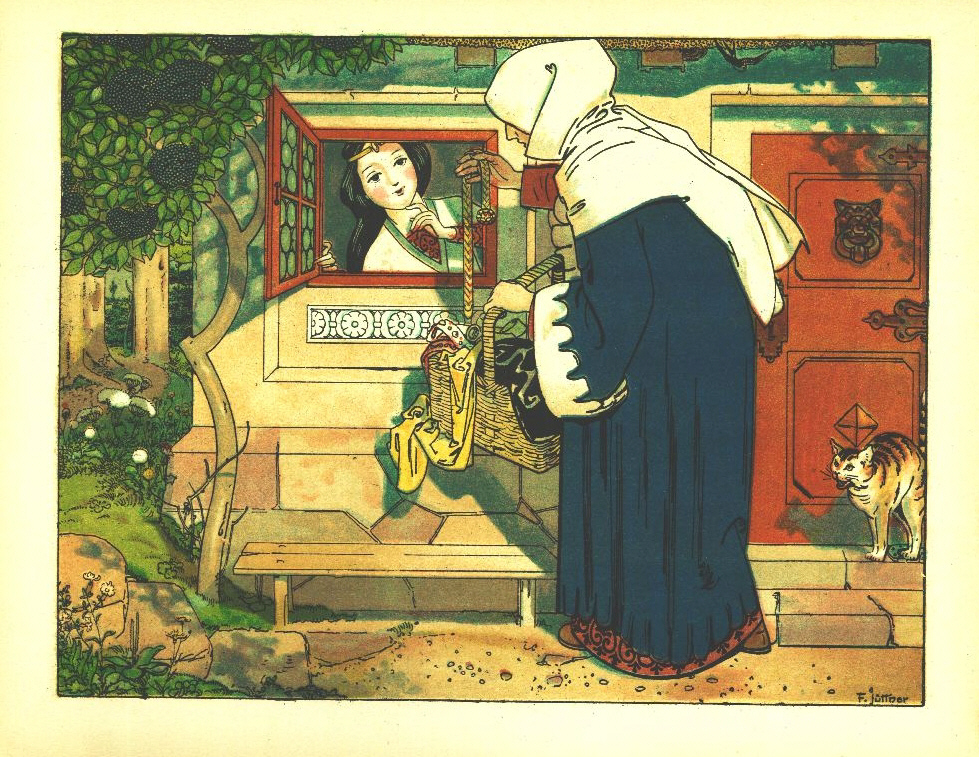
5. The Queen visits Snow White

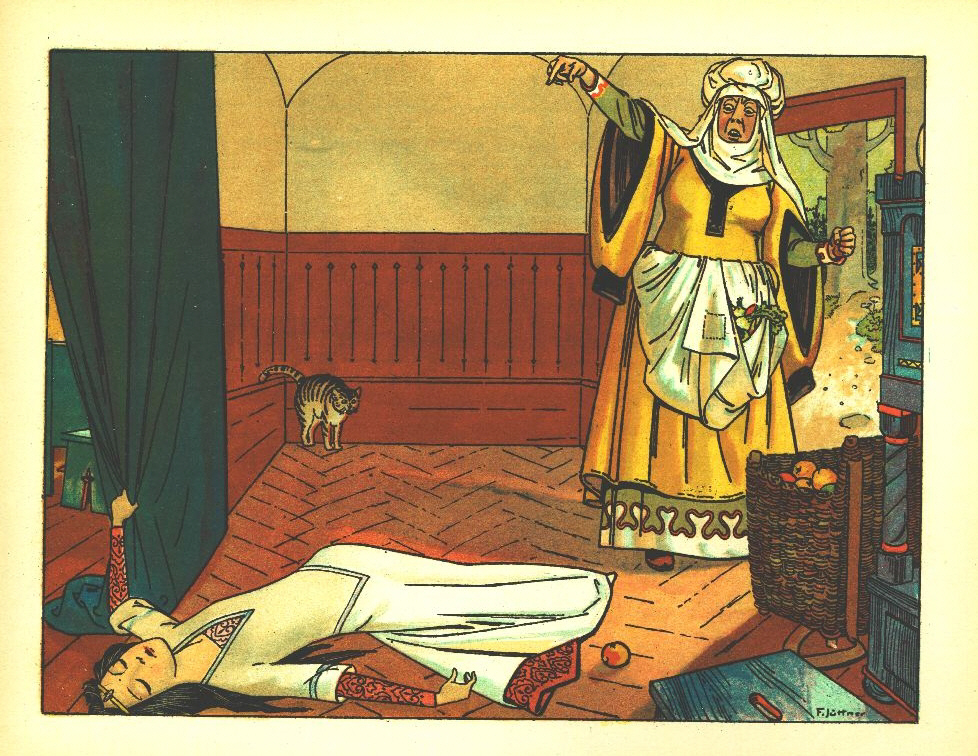
6. The Queen has poisoned Snow White

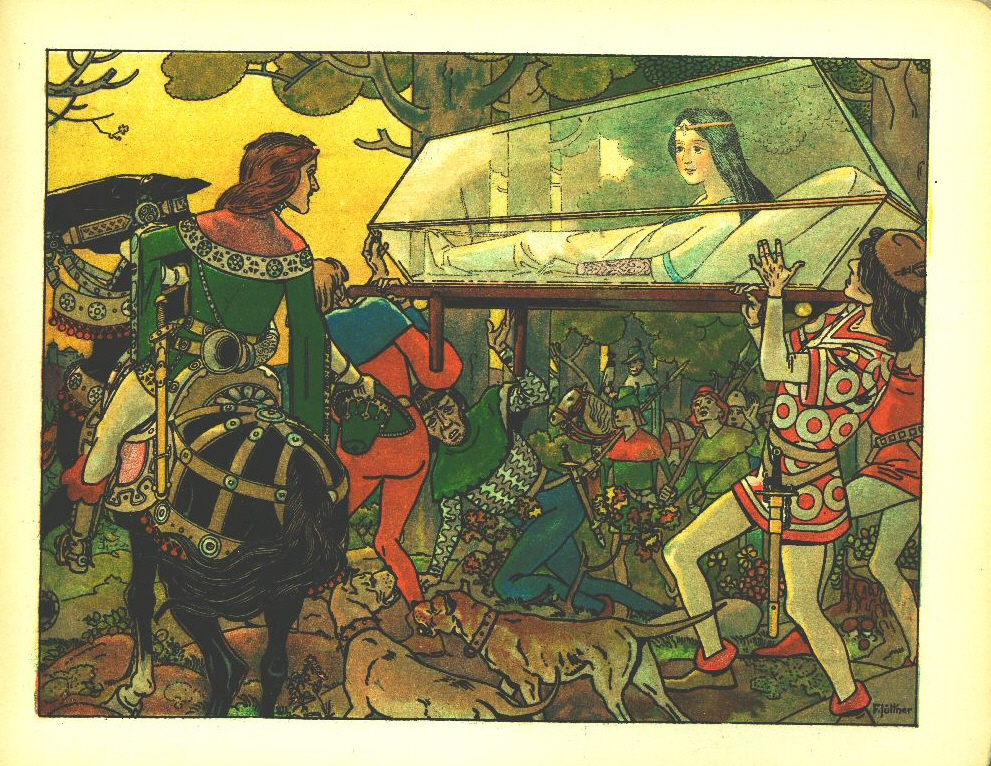
7. The Prince awakens Snow White

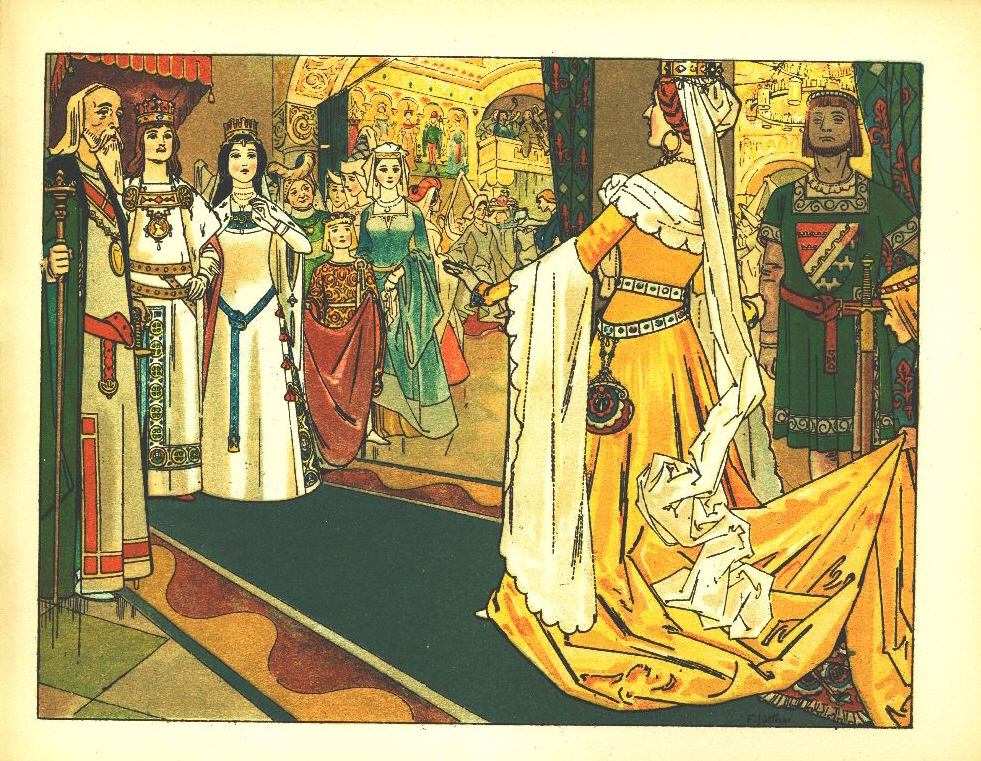
8. The Queen discovers and confronts Snow White at her wedding

== Characters ==
=== Snow White ===
Snow White is the main character in the story and stepdaughter to the Evil Queen. She is described by the Evil Queen's Magic Mirror as the fairest of the land. She survives several attempts by the jealous queen to murder her. After Snow White is spared by the huntsman sent by her stepmother to assassinate her, she takes shelter at the home of seven dwarfs. Finally, the Evil Queen disguises herself as an old woman and tricks Snow White into eating a poison apple, which puts her in a deep sleep. Snow White is later revived and marries the prince.

=== Seven Dwarfs ===
The Seven Dwarfs are a group of dwarfs that let Snow White live with them.

=== The Evil Queen ===
The Evil Queen deeply envies Snow White for her looks and her jealousy leads her to attempt to murder Snow White in multiple different ways. The Evil Queen first tries to murder Snow White via a huntsman who she has sent to assassinate her. The Evil Queen then decides to murder Snow White by disguising herself as an old woman in order to gain her trust so she can then poison her. The Evil Queen initially attempts to poison Snow White with a comb, but when that fails, she disguises herself as an old woman and gives Snow White a poison apple. The Evil Queen's third attempt to kill Snow White is successful: Snow White bites into the poisoned apple and dies.

=== The Huntsman ===
The Evil Queen orders an unnamed Huntsman to take Snow White into the deepest woods to be killed. As proof that Snow White is dead, the Queen demands that he return with her lungs and liver. The Huntsman takes Snow White into the forest, but spares her. The Huntsman leaves her behind alive, convinced that the girl would be eaten by some wild animal.

Other adaptions have Snow White either avoiding the Huntsman or the Huntsman being unable to kill Snow White, stating that the Queen wants her dead, and to get far away from the kingdom as possible.

The Huntsman instead brings the Queen the lungs and liver of a wild boar which is prepared by the cook and eaten by the Queen.

=== The Magic Mirror ===
The Magic Mirror is an omniscient and seemingly sentient mirror that the Queen uses to confirm her status as the "fairest in the land".

=== The King ===
The King is the father of Snow White and a minor character in the story.

=== The Queen ===
The Queen is the mother of Snow White and the wife of the King who died giving birth to her.

=== The Prince ===
The Prince marries Snow White after she is revived while the Prince and his servants take her to be buried.

== Editions ==
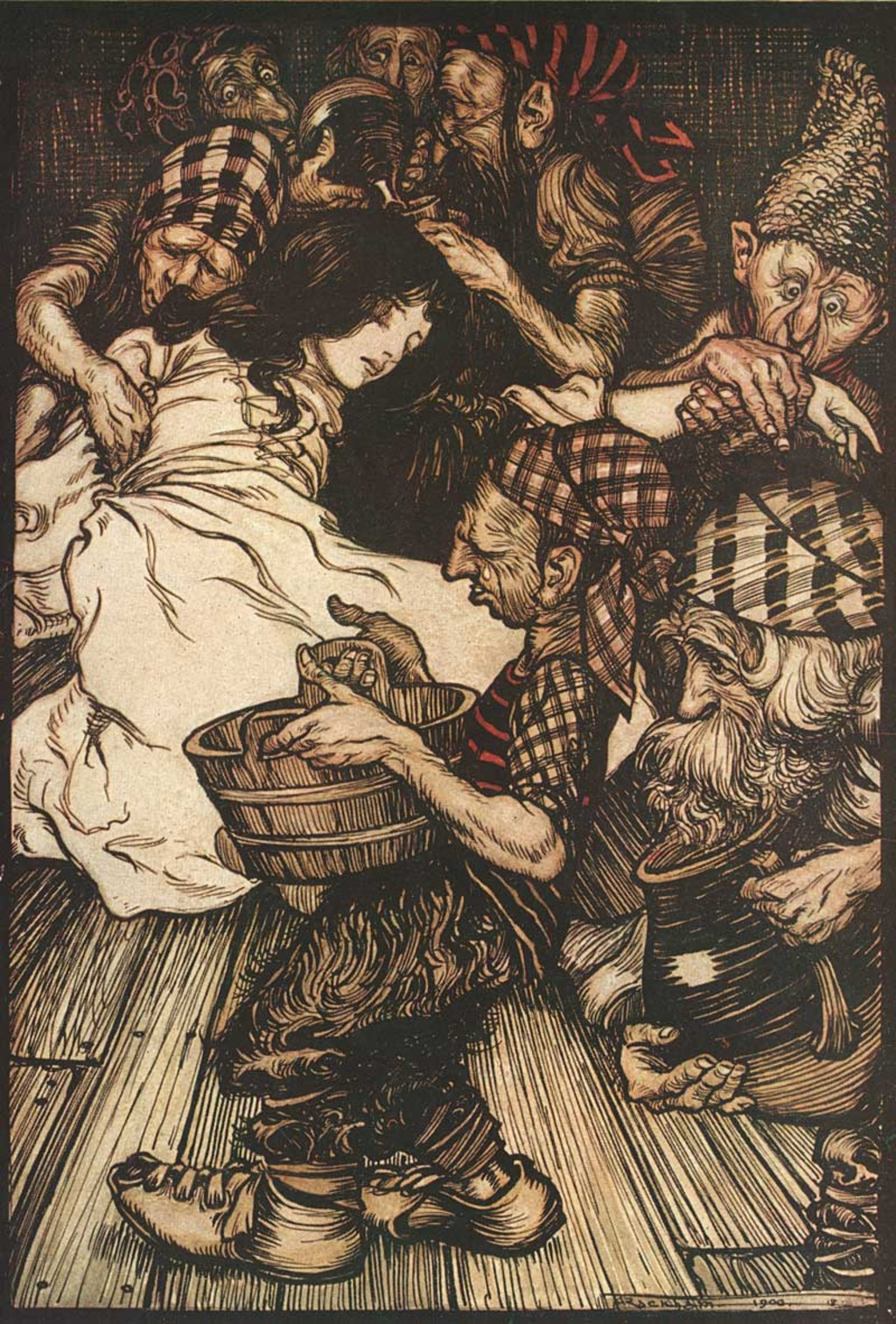
Illustration by Arthur Rackham for a 1909 English-language edition of the Brothers Grimm's fairy tales

The Brothers Grimm made several changes from the 1810 manuscript Schneeweißchen auch: das Unglückskind ("Snow White, or: The Unlucky Child") to the 1854 revision for the 1857 last edition of Kinder- und Hausmärchen. The most substantial differences appear in the manuscript and in the first edition of 1812, such as the Evil Queen being Snow White's biological mother. With the second edition of 1819, the tale underwent a major revision, which then became the stable basis for the five subsequent re-editions, up to the final version of 1857, where only minor changes were introduced.

=== 1810 manuscript ===
In the 1810 manuscript, the main differences from the published versions are the following:

- Snow White's mother does not die but later behaves the same way the stepmother does in later versions of the tale, including the 1854 iteration.
- Snow White is blonde and has eyes as black as ebony.
- The line that the queen says to the mirror is: 'Mirror, mirror on the wall, who is the fairest woman in England?'
- The huntsman does not appear: it is the queen herself who takes her daughter into the forest, taking advantage of the king's absence while he is away at war. Once they arrive in the carriage, she orders the girl to get out and pick some red roses, then abandons her there, leaving without her.
- Snow White bites into the apple, which has been poisoned only on one half, and dies from the poison (not because the apple got stuck in her throat causing a state of apparent death).
- The scene in which the dwarfs wash Snow White with water and wine to revive her is absent.
- The saving role falls to Snow White's father. The king, returning to his kingdom and passing through the forest where the seven dwarfs live, finds the coffin and is overwhelmed with grief at the death of his beloved daughter. Since his entourage includes skilled physicians, they request to take the body with them. In a room, they tie Snow White to the four corners with ropes, and it is in this way that she comes back to life.
- At the castle, Snow White is married to a handsome prince, and at the wedding a pair of shoes is heated over the fire, which the queen must wear, forcing her to dance until she dies. It is not specified, however, that the shoes are made of iron.
- In a final note, Jacob Grimm adds that, according to other sources, the dwarfs bring Snow White back to life by striking her 32 times with small magical hammers.

=== 1812 edition ===
In the 1812 version, the main plot largely takes the form of the later editions, but there are still prominent differences:

- In this case too, Snow White's mother does not die and serves as the story's antagonist.
- It is not specified which physical feature of Snow White the color red refers to; her eyes are as black as ebony, while her hair color is unclear.
- The dwarfs do not wash Snow White's (apparently dead) body with water or wine.
- Snow White's coffin is placed in the dwarfs' house, not on a mountain.
- The prince becomes so obsessed with Snow White that he carries her coffin wherever he goes, until one of his servants, in anger, lifts Snow White from the coffin and strikes her on the back, causing the piece of apple to come out of her throat.

== Inspiration ==
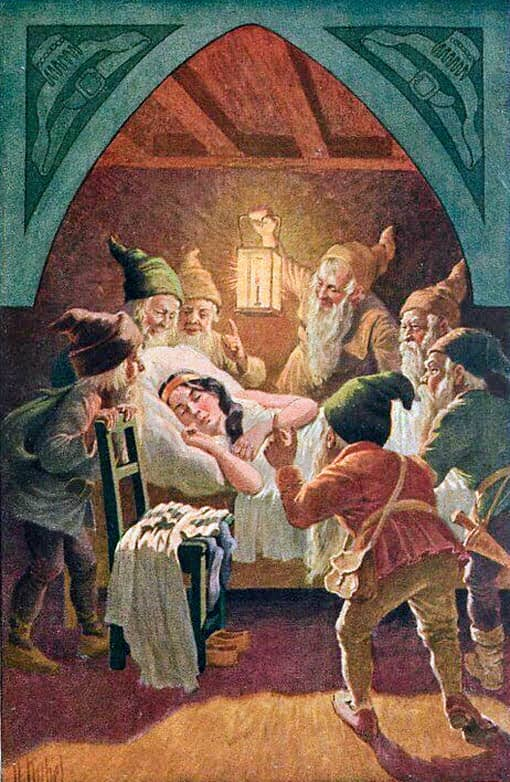
Illustration by Otto Kubel

Scholars have theorized about the possible origins of the tale, with folklorists such as Sigrid Schmidt, Joseph Jacobs and Christine Goldberg noting that it combines multiple motifs also found in other folktales. Scholar Graham Anderson compares the fairy tale to the Roman legend of Chione, or "Snow," recorded in Ovid's Metamorphoses.

In the 1980s and 1990s, some German authors suggested that the fairy tale could have been inspired by a real person. Eckhard Sander, a teacher, claimed that the inspiration was Margaretha von Waldeck, a German countess born in 1533, as well as several other women in her family. Karlheinz Bartels, a pharmacist and scholar from Lohr am Main, a town in northwestern Bavaria, created a tongue-in-cheek theory that Snow White was Maria Sophia Margarethe Catharina, Baroness von und zu Erthal, born in 1725. However, these theories are generally dismissed by serious scholars, with folklore professor Donald Haase calling them "pure speculation and not at all convincing."

== Variations ==
The principal studies of traditional Snow White variants are Ernst Böklen's, Schneewittchen Studien of 1910, which reprints fifty Snow White variants, and studies by Steven Swann Jones. In their first edition, the Brothers Grimm published the version they had first collected, in which the villain is Snow White's jealous biological mother. In a version sent to another folklorist prior to the first edition, additionally, she does not order a servant to take her to the woods, but takes her there herself to gather flowers and abandons her; in the first edition, this task was transferred to a servant. It is believed that the change to a stepmother in later editions was to tone down the story for children.

Another version of the story is the 1937 American animated film Snow White and the Seven Dwarfs by Walt Disney, which was so influential that its popularity has surpassed the original Grimm tale and all other versions. Disney's variation of Snow White gave the dwarfs names and included a singing Snow White who is shown to be more mature. Other changes include:

- The Queen forces Snow White to work as a scullery maid, a motif borrowed from Cinderella.
- Snow White and her prince meet and fall in love before she bites the apple.
- Instead of her lungs and liver, the huntsman is asked by the queen to bring back Snow White's heart. While the heart is mentioned, it is never shown in the box.
- Snow White is discovered by the dwarfs after cleaning the house, not vandalizing it.
- The evil queen tries only once to kill Snow White (with the poisoned apple) and fails. The dwarfs then chase her through the forest, after which she dies by falling down a cliff and being crushed by a boulder.
- The prince wakes Snow White by kissing her, a detail borrowed from Grimm's Little Briar Rose. This innovation has been repeated in many subsequent versions.

=== Variants and parallels to other tales ===
This tale type is widespread in Europe, in America, in Africa and "in some Turkic traditions," the Middle East, in China, in India and in the Americas. Jörg Bäcker draws a parallel to Turkic tales, as well as other tales with a separate origin but overlapping themes, such as those in Central Asia and Eastern Siberia, among the Mongolians and Tungusian peoples. Due to Portuguese colonization, Sigrid Schmidt posits the presence of the tale in modern times in former Portuguese colonies, and contrasts it with other distinct African tales.

=== Europe ===
A primary analysis by Celtic folklorist Alfred Nutt, in the 19th century, established the tale type, in Europe, was distributed "from the Balkan peninsula to Iceland, and from Russia to Catalonia", with the highest number of variants being found in Germany and Italy.

This geographical distribution seemed to be confirmed by scholarly studies of the 20th century. A 1957 article by Italian philologist Gianfranco D'Aronco (it) studied the most diffused Tales of Magic in Italian territory, among which Biancaneve. A scholarly inquiry by Italian Istituto centrale per i beni sonori ed audiovisivi ("Central Institute of Sound and Audiovisual Heritage"), produced in the late 1960s and early 1970s, found thirty-seven variants of the tale across Italian sources. A similar assessment was made by scholar Sigrid Schmidt, who claimed that the tale type was "particularly popular" in Southern Europe, "specially" in Italy, Greece and the Iberian Peninsula. In addition, Swedish scholar Waldemar Liungman suggested Italy as center of diffusion of the story, since he considered Italy as the source of tale ("Ursprung"), and it holds the highest number of variants not derived from the Grimm's tale.

Another study, by researcher Theo Meder, points to a wide distribution in Western Europe, specially in Ireland, Iceland and Scandinavia.

==== Germany ====
The Brothers Grimm's "Snow White" was predated by several other German versions of the tale, with the earliest being Johann Karl August Musäus's "Richilde" (1782), a satirical novella told from the wicked stepmother's point of view. Albert Ludwig Grimm (no relation to the Brothers Grimm) published a play version, Schneewittchen, in 1809. The Grimms collected at least eight other distinct variants of the tale, which they considered one of the most famous German folktales. They found that it was particularly well known in Hesse, noting that even in that district—where High German predominates—the Low German name Sneewitchen persisted, sometimes altered to Schliwitchen. From these stories, they drew and combined various elements, partially shortening them to create the definitive version. The opening, with the drops of the mother's blood, recalls a motif found in the tale The Juniper Tree, recorded by the painter Philipp Otto Runge.

In their comparative notes on the tale, the Grimms mention several unpublished variants. In one, the queen cuts herself while peeling an apple during a sleigh ride with the king. In another, there are a count and countess; here, it is the father who wishes for a daughter white as snow, red as blood, and with hair black as a raven, after passing three heaps of snow, three pits of blood, and three black ravens. Soon after, they encounter a girl with these traits, whom the count welcomes but the countess despises, plotting to rid herself of her. Under the pretext of retrieving a fallen glove, she leaves the girl alone in the forest, where she finds refuge with the dwarfs. In a third story, the only variation is that the queen takes Snow White into the forest and asks her to gather a nosegay of roses, only to leave her behind.

In a fourth variant, after Snow White's death, the dwarfs decide to burn her, wrapping her in a sheet and suspending her above a pile of wood. Just before the fire is lit, the prince arrives, lowers her, and takes her with him; the motion of the carriage dislodges the piece of poisoned apple from her throat, restoring her to life. In a fifth story, a widowed king has a daughter named Snow White and marries a woman who bears him three daughters of his own. The stepmother, envious of her stepdaughter's beauty, leads her to a cave inhabited by seven dwarfs who kill any girl who enters. Struck by her beauty, the dwarfs spare her on the condition that she tend to their house. Snow White has a dog named "Mirror," left at the castle grieving for her. The dog under a bench is questioned by the Queen about who is the fairest in England, and he replies that Snow White surpasses the stepmother and her three daughters in beauty. The Queen goes to Snow White, telling her that a knight has kidnapped her daughters and that, now left alone, she would like to live with her and dress her prettily. Moved to pity, the girl lets her in, but the Queen tries to kill her first with a poisoned stay-lace and then with a poisoned hair-ribbon. On both occasions Snow White is saved by the dwarfs, yet despite their warnings, she once again allows herself to be touched by her stepmother's words. At last, the Queen succeeds by making her eat a poisoned apple. The dwarfs make a silver coffin for her and place it on a tree in front of their cave. A prince, passing by, asks them to give him the coffin, and once he brings it home, he lays Snow White on a bed and dresses her as if she were alive, loving her above measure. A servant, tasked with watching over her, grows weary of his duty, and one day gives her a blow on her back: the piece of apple comes out of her mouth, and Snow White returns to life.

A Viennese version tells of three sisters, with Snow White as the youngest and most beautiful. The envious sisters send her away with a piece of bread and a jar of water. She arrives at the Glass Mountain, where she finds refuge with the dwarfs. When the sisters consult the mirror, they are told that the fairest lives with the dwarfs. Here too, envy leads to an attempt to poison her.

Moreover, in 1845 Ludwig Bechstein published a variant very similar to the Grimm version in his Deutsches Märchenbuch, under the title Schneeweißchen, with the main difference that Snow White forgives the queen, who goes unpunished.

==== Italy ====
The Pentamerone, published 1634–1636, contains some stories with similarities to Snow White, such as an enchanted sleep in "The Young Slave" and a female character with snow-white skin in "The Raven." In most Italian versions of Snow White, the heroine is not the daughter of a king but an innkeeper, the antagonist is not her stepmother but her biological mother, and instead of dwarfs she takes refuge with robbers. For instance, in La Bella Venezia, an Abruzzian version collected by Antonio De Nino, the mother asks her customers if they have seen a woman more beautiful than she. If they say they did not, she only charges them half the price, if they say they did she charges them twice the price. When the customers tell her that her daughter is prettier than her, she gets jealous. In Maria, her Evil Stepmother and the Seven Robbers (Maria, die böse Stiefmutter und die sieben Räuber), a Sicilian version collected by Laura Gonzenbach the heroine also lives with robbers, but the antagonist is her stepmother and she's not an innkeeper.

Sometimes the heroine's protectors are female instead of male, as in The Cruel Stepmother (La crudel matrigna), a variant collected by Angelo de Gubernatis in which, like in the Grimm's version, Snow White's counterpart, called here Caterina, is the daughter of a king, and the antagonist is her stepmother, who orders her servants to kill her stepdaughter after she hears people commenting how much prettier Caterina is than she. One day the two women are going to mass together. Instead of a male protector, Caterina takes refuge in a house by the seashore where an old woman lives. Later a witch discovers that Caterina's still alive and where she lives, so she goes to tell the queen, who sends her back to the cottage to kill her with poisoned flowers instead of an apple. A similar version from Siena was collected by Sicilian folklorist Giuseppe Pitrè, in which the heroine, called Ermellina, runs away from home riding an eagle who takes her away to a palace inhabited by fairies. Ermellina's stepmother sends a witch disguised as her stepdaughter's servants to the fairies' palace to try to kill her twice, first with poisoned sweetmeats and the second time with an enchanted dress. Pitré also collected a variant from Palermo titled Child Margarita (La 'Nfanti Margarita) where the heroine stays in a haunted castle.

There's also a couple of conversions that combines the ATU tale type 709 with the second part of the type 410 Sleeping Beauty, in which, when the heroine is awakened, the prince's mother tries to kill her and the children she has had with the prince. Gonzenbach collected two variants from Sicily, the first one called Maruzzedda and the second Beautiful Anna; and Vittorio Imbriani collected a version titled La Bella Ostessina.

In some versions, the antagonists are not the heroine's mother or stepmother, but her two elder sisters, as in a version from Trentino collected by Christian Schneller, or a version from Bologna collected by Carolina Coronedi-Berti. In this last version, the role of both the mirror and the dwarfs is played by the Moon, which tells the elder sisters that the youngest, called Ziricochel, is the prettiest, and later hides her in his palace. When the sisters discover Ziricochel is still alive, they send an astrologer to kill her. After several attempts, she finally manages to turn her into a statue with an enchanted shirt. Ziricochel is revived after the prince's sisters take the shirt off.

Italo Calvino included the version from Bologna collected by Coronedi Berti, retitling it Giricoccola, and the Abruzzian version collected by De Nino in Italian Folktales.

==== France ====
Paul Sébillot collected two variants from Brittany in northwestern France. In the first one, titled The Enchanted Stockings (Les Bas enchantés), starts similarly to Gubernatis' version, with the heroine being the daughter of a queen, and her mother wanting to kill her after a soldier marching in front of her balcony says the princess is prettier than the queen. The role of the poisoned apple is fulfilled by the titular stockings, and the heroine is revived after the prince's little sister takes them off when she's playing. In the second, titled La petite Toute-Belle, a servant accuses the heroine of stealing the things she stole and then throws her in a well. The heroine survives the fall and ends up living with three dragons that live at the bottom of the well. When the heroine's mother discovers her daughter is still alive, she twice sends a fairy to attempt to kill her, first with sugar almonds, which the dragons warn her are poisoned before she eats them, and then with a red dress. In another version from Brittany, this one collected by François Cadic, the heroine is called Rose-Neige (Eng: Snow-Rose) because her mother pricked her finger with a rose in a snowy day and wished to have a child as beautiful as the rose. The role of the dwarfs is played by Korrigans, dwarf-like creatures from the Breton folklore. Louis Morin collected a version from Troyes in northeastern France, where like in the Grimm's version the mother questions a magic mirror. A version from Corsica titled Anghjulina was collected by Geneviève Massignon, where the roles of both the huntsman and the dwarfs are instead a group of bandits whom Anghjulina's mother asks to kill her daughter, but they instead take her away to live with them in the woods.

==== Belgium and the Netherlands ====
A Flemish version from Antwerp collected by Victor de Meyere is quite similar to the version collected by the brothers Grimm. The heroine is called Sneeuwwitje (Snow White in Dutch), she is the queen's stepdaughter, and the stepmother questions a mirror. Instead of dwarfs, the princess is taken in by seven kabouters. Instead of going to kill Snow White herself, the queen twice sends the witch who had sold her the magic mirror to kill Sneeuwwitje, first with a comb and the second time with an apple. But the most significant difference is that the role of the prince in this version is instead Snow White's father, the king.

Another Flemish variant, this one from Hamme, differs more from Grimm's story. The one who wants to kill the heroine, called here Mauricia, is her own biological mother. She is convinced by a demon with a spider head that if her daughter dies, she will become beautiful. The mother sends two servants to kill Mauricia, bringing as proof a lock of her hair, a bottle with her blood, a piece of her tongue and a piece of her clothes. The servants spare Mauricia's life, as well as her pet sheep. To deceive Mauricia's mother, they buy a goat and bring a bottle with the animal's blood as well as a piece of his tongue. Meanwhile, Mauricia is taken in by seventeen robbers who live in a cave deep in the forest, instead of seven dwarfs. When Mauricia's mother discovers that her daughter is still alive, she goes to the robbers' cave disguised. She turns her daughter into a bird, and she takes her place. The plan fails and Mauricia recovers her human form, so the mother tries to kill her by using a magic ring which the demon gave her. Mauricia is awoken when a prince takes the ring off her finger. When he asks her if he would marry her, she rejects him and returns with the seventeen robbers.

==== Iberian Peninsula ====
One of the first versions from Spain, titled The Beautiful Stepdaughter (La hermosa hijastra), was collected by Manuel Milà i Fontanals, in which a demon tells the stepmother that her stepdaughter is prettier than she is when she's looking at herself in the mirror. The stepmother orders her servants to take her stepdaughter to the forest and kill her, bringing a bottle with her blood as proof. But the servants spare her life and instead kill a dog. Eight days later the demon warns her that the blood in the bottle is not her stepdaughter's, and the stepmother sends her servants again, ordering them to bring one of her heart and bare-toes as proof. The stepdaughter later discovers four men living in the forest, inside a rock that can open and close with the right words. Every day after she sees the men leave she enters the cave and cleans it up. Believing it must be an intruder, the men take turns to stay at the cavern, but the first one falls asleep during his watch. The second one manages to catch the girl, and they agree to let the girl live with them. Later, the same demon that told her stepmother that her stepdaughter was prettier gives the girl an enchanted ring, that has the same role that the apple in the Grimm's version. The version in Catalan included by Francisco Maspons y Labrós in the second volume of Lo Rondallayre follows that plot fairly closely, with some minor differences.

In an Aragonese version titled The Good Daughter (La buena hija) collected by Romualdo Nogués y Milagro, there's no mirror. Instead, the story starts with the mother already hating her daughter because she's prettier, and ordering a servant to kill her, bringing as proof her heart, tongue, and her little finger. The servant spares her and brings the mother the heart and tongue from a dog he ran over and says he lost the finger. The daughter is taken in by robbers living in a cavern, but despite all, she still misses her mother. One day an old woman appears and gives her a ring, saying that if she puts it on she'll see her mother. The daughter actually falls unconscious when she does put it on because the old woman is actually a witch who wants to kidnap her, but she can't because of the scapular the girl is wearing, so she locks her in a crystal casket, where the girl is later found by the prince.

In a version from Mallorca collected by Antoni Maria Alcover i Sureda titled Na Magraneta, a queen wishes to have a daughter after eating a pomegranate and calls her Magraneta. As in the Grimm's version the queen asks her mirror who's the most beautiful. The dwarf's role is fulfilled by thirteen men who are described as big as giants, who live in a castle in the middle of the forest called "Castell de la Colometa", whose doors can open and close by command. When the queen discovers thanks to her mirror that her daughter is still alive she sends an evil fairy disguised as an old woman. The role of the poisoned apple is fulfilled by an iron ring.

Aurelio Macedonio Espinosa Sr. collected two Spanish versions. The first one, titled Blanca Flor, is from Villaluenga de la Sagra, in Toledo. In this one the villain is the heroine's own biological mother, and like in Na Magraneta she questions a mirror if there's a woman more beautiful than she is. Instead of ordering a huntsman or servant to kill her daughter, after the mirror tells the woman her daughter has surpassed her, she tries to get rid of her daughter herself, inviting her to go for a walk in the countryside, and when they reach a rock she recites some spells from her book, making the rock swallow her daughter. Fortunately thanks to her prayers to the Virgin the daughter survives and gets out the rock, and she is later taken in by twelve robbers living in a castle. When the mother discovers her daughter is still alive, she sends a witch to kill her, who gives the daughter an enchanted silk shirt. The moment she puts it on, she falls in a deathlike state. She's later revived when a sexton takes the shirt off. The second one, titled The Envious Mother (La madre envidiosa), comes from Jaraíz de la Vera, Cáceres. Here the villain is also the heroine's biological mother, and she's an innkeeper who asks a witch whether there's a woman prettier than she is. Instead of a shirt, here the role of the apple is fulfilled by enchanted shoes. Aurelio de Llano Roza de Ampudia collected an Asturian version from Teverga titled The Envious Stepmother (La madrastra envidiosa), in which the stepmother locks her stepdaughter in a room with the hope that no one will see her and think she's more beautiful. But the attempt fails when a guest tells the mother the girl locked in a room is prettier than she is. The story ends with the men who found the heroine discussing who should marry the girl once she's revived, and she replies by telling them that she chooses to marry the servant who revived her. Aurelio Macedonio Espinosa Jr. collected four versions. The first one is titled Blancanieves, is from Medina del Campo, Valladolid, and follows the plot of the Grimm's version fairly closely with barely any significant differences. The same happens with the second one, titled Blancaflor, that comes from Tordesillas, another location from Valladolid. The last two are the ones that present more significant differences, although like in Grimm's the stepmother questions a magic mirror. The Bad Stepmother (La mala madrastra) comes from Sepúlveda, Segovia, and also has instead of seven dwarfs the robbers that live in a cave deep in the forest, that can open and close at command. Here the words to make it happen are "Open, parsley!" and "Close, peppermint!" The last one, Blancaflor, is from Siete Iglesias de Trabancos, also in Valladolid, ends with the heroine buried after biting a poisoned pear, and the mirror proclaiming that, now that her stepdaughter is finally dead, the stepmother is the most beautiful again.

One of the first Portuguese versions was collected by Francisco Adolfo Coelho. It was titled The Enchanted Shoes (Os sapatinhos encantados), where the heroine is the daughter of an innkeeper, who asks muleteers if they have seen a woman prettier than she is. One day, one answers that her daughter is prettier. The daughter takes refugee with a group of robbers who live in the forest, and the role of the apple is fulfilled by the titular enchanted shoes. Zófimo Consiglieri Pedroso collected another version, titled The Vain Queen, in which the titular queen questions her maids of honor and servants who's the most beautiful. One day, when she asks the same question to her chamberlain, he replies the queen's daughter is more beautiful than she is. The queen orders her servants to behead her daughter and bring back her tongue as proof, but they instead spare her and bring the queen a dog's tongue. The princess is taken in by a man, who gives her two options, to live with him as either his wife or his daughter, and the princess chooses the second. The rest of the tale is quite different from most versions, with the titular queen completely disappeared from the story, and the story focusing instead of a prince that falls in love with the princess.

==== Great Britain ====
In the Scottish version Gold-Tree and Silver-Tree, queen Silver-Tree asks a trout in a well, instead of a magic mirror, who's the most beautiful. When the trout tells her that Gold-Tree, her daughter, is more beautiful, Silver-Tree pretends to fall ill, declaring that her only cure is to eat her own daughter's heart and liver. To save his daughter's life, the king marries her off to a prince, and serves his wife a goat's heart and liver. After Silver-Tree discovers that she has been deceived thanks to the trout, she visits her daughter and sticks her finger on a poisoned thorn. The prince later remarries, and his second wife removes the poisoned thorn from Gold-Tree, reviving her. The second wife then tricks the queen into drinking the poison that was meant for Gold-Tree. In another Scottish version, Lasair Gheug, the King of Ireland's Daughter, the heroine's stepmother frames the princess for the murder of the queen's firstborn and manages to make her swear she'll never tell the truth to anybody. Lasair Gheug, a name that in Gaelic means Flame of Branches, take refugee with thirteen cats, who turn out to be an enchanted prince and his squires. After marrying the prince and having three sons with him the queen discovers her stepdaughter is still alive, also thanks to a talking trout, and sends three giants of ice to put her in a death-like state. As in Gold-Tree and Silver-Tree the prince takes a second wife afterwards, and the second wife is the one who revives the heroine. Thomas William Thompson collected an English version from Blackburn simply titled Snow White which follows Grimm's plot much more closely, although with some significant differences, such as Snow White being taken in by three robbers instead of seven dwarfs.

==== Scandinavia ====
One of the first Danish versions collected was Snehvide (Snow White), by Mathias Winther. In this variant, the stepmother is the princess' nurse, who persuades Snow White to ask her father to marry her. Because the king says he won't remarry until grass grows in the grave of the princess' mother, the nurse plants magic seeds in the grave so grass will grow quicker. Then, after the king marries the nurse, Snow White gets betrothed to a prince, who chooses her over the nurse's three biological daughters, but after that the king and the prince had to leave to fight in a war. The queen seizes her opportunity to chase Snow White away, and she ends up living with the dwarfs in a mountain. When the queen finds out Snow White is still alive thanks to a magic mirror, she sends her daughters three times, each time one of them, with poisoned gifts to give them to her. With the third gift, a poisoned apple, Snow White falls into a deep sleep, and the dwarfs leave her in the forest, fearing that the king would accuse them of killing her once he comes back. When the king and the prince finally come back from the war and find Snow White's body, the king dies of sorrow, but the prince manages to wake her up. After that we see an ending quite similar to the ones in The Goose Girl and The Three Oranges of Love the prince and Snow White get married, and the prince invites the stepmother and asks her what punishment deserve someone who has hurt someone as innocent as Snow White. The queen suggests for the culprit to be put inside a barrel full of needles, and the prince tells the stepmother she has pronounced her own sentence. Evald Tang Kristensen collected a version titled The Pretty Girl and the Crystal Bowls (Den Kjønne Pige og de Klare Skåle), which, like some Italian variants, combines the tale type 709 with the type 410. In this version, the stepmother questions a pair of crystal bowls instead of a magic mirror, and when they tell her that her stepdaughter is prettier, she sends her to a witch's hut where she's tricked to eat a porridge that makes her pregnant. Ashamed that her daughter has become pregnant out of wedlock she kicks her out, but the girl is taken in by a shepherd. Later a crow lets a ring fall on the huts' floor, and, when the heroine puts it on, she falls in a deathlike state. Believing she's dead the shepherd kills himself and the heroine is later revived when she gives birth to twins, each one of them with a star on the forehead, and one of them sucks the ring off her finger. She's later found by a prince, whose mother tries to kill the girl and her children.

A Swedish version titled The Daughter of the Sun and the Twelve Bewitched Princes (Solens dotter och de tolv förtrollade prinsarna) starts pretty similarly to the Grimm's version, with a queen wishing to have a child as white as snow and as red as blood, but that child turned out to be not the heroine but the villain, her own biological mother. Instead of a mirror, the queen asks the Sun, who tells her that her daughter will surpass her in beauty. Because of it the queen orders that her daughter must be raised in the countryside, away from the Royal Court, but when it's time for the princess to come back the queen orders a servant to throw her in a well before she arrives. In the bottom, the princess meets twelve princes cursed to be chimeras, and she agrees to live with them. When the queen and the servant discover she is alive, they give her poisoned candy, which she eats. After being revived by a young king she marries him and has a son with him, but the queen goes to the castle pretending to be a midwife, turns her daughter into a golden bird by sticking a needle on her head, and then the queen takes her daughter's place. After disenchanting the twelve princes with her singing, the princess returns to the court, where she's finally restored to her human form, and her mother is punished after she believed she ate her own daughter while she was still under the spell.

==== Greece and Albania ====
French folklorist Henri Carnoy collected a Greek version, titled Marietta and the Witch her Stepmother (Marietta et la Sorcière, sa Marâtre), in which the heroine is manipulated by her governess to kill her own mother, so the governess could marry her father. Soon after she marries Marietta's father, the new stepmother orders her husband to get rid of his daughter. Marietta ends up living in a castle with forty giants. Meanwhile, Marietta's stepmother, believing her stepdaughter is dead, asks the Sun who's the most beautiful. When the Sun answers Marietta is more beautiful, she realises her stepdaughter is still alive, and, disguised as a peddler, goes to the giants' castle to kill her. She goes twice, the first trying to kill her with an enchanted ring, and the second with poisoned grapes. After Marietta is awoken and marries the prince, the stepmother goes to the prince's castle pretending to be a midwife, sticks a fork on Marietta's head to turn her into a pigeon, and then takes her place. After several transformations, Marietta recovers her human form and her stepmother is punished. Georgios A. Megas collected another Greek version, titled Myrsina, in which the antagonists are the heroine's two elder sisters, and the role of the seven dwarfs is fulfilled by the Twelve Months.

Austrian diplomat Johann Georg von Hahn collected a version from Albania, that also starts with the heroine, called Marigo, getting manipulated by the governess into killing her mother. She snaps her mother's head off with a marble lid, while she was leaning over the marble chest to get her figs and almonds. After Marigo tells her father to marry the governess, the king refuses, making up various excuses, like his shoes turning red or his robes being full of holes. All of them are fulfilled by Marigo under the manipulation of her governess, therefore, the king keeps his promise and marries her. Some years after, Marigo grows up to be a beautiful young woman, even more attractive than the queen. Jealous, the stepmother forces her husband to choose between them. Either she kills herself or the king kills his daughter. But the king doesn't have the heart to murder his own child, so he takes Marigo into the woods and tells her to fetch him the loaf of bread and the wooden flask which he threw off the cliff. When Marigo comes back, she fails to find her father and realises that he has abandoned her. As it was dark, the girl climbs up a wooden tree to spend the night. While she is asleep, the three Fatia, goddesses of fate, take pity on her and decide to wish her good. Each of the fatia suggest a choice for the girl. The third goddess tells her to find the castle inhabited by forty dragons who are all brothers. They take Marigo as their surrogate sister and she helps them with the castle chores, while they gift her precious jewellery. After discovering her stepdaughter is still alive thanks to the Sun, the queen twice sends her husband to the dragons' castle to kill Marigo, first with enchanted hair-pins and the second time with an enchanted ring. After the dragons fail to bring her alive, they decide to bury her in a coffin adorned with pearls. They hang it in a young king's garden where an ancient tree near a beautiful fountain is to be found. The dragons suspend the coffin on four silver chains so that it would dangle right over the fountain. When the king finds the coffin, he takes it to his bedchamber and hides it for an entire year, refusing to eat, drink or sleep out of sorrow. His mother, the dowager queen, finds Marigo's corpse and tells the maids to burn her. Marigo wakes up when one of the maids steals the ring off her finger. Eventually, she marries the young king and lives happily aver after.

In another Albanian version, titled Fatimé, collected by French folklorist Auguste Dozon, the antagonists are the heroine's two elder sisters.

==== Russia and Eastern Europe ====
According to Christine Shojaei Kawan, the earliest surviving folktale version of the Snow White story is a Russian tale published anonymously in 1795. The heroine is Olga, a merchant's daughter, and the role of the magic mirror is played by some beggars who comment on her beauty. In the Russian tale, titled "Сказка о старичках-келейчиках", a merchant has a daughter named Olga, and marries another woman. Years later, the girl's stepmother welcomes some beggars in need of alms, who tell her Olga is more beautiful than her. A servant takes Olga to the open field and, in tears, tells the girl the stepmother ordered her to be killed and her heart and little finger brought back as proof of the deed. Olga cuts off her little finger and gives to the servant, who kills a little dog and takes out its heart. Olga takes refuge in a cottage with hunters, and asks the beggars to trade gifts with her stepmother: Olga sends a pie, and her stepmother sends her a poisoned pearl-studded shirt. Olga puts on the shirt and faints, as if dead. The hunters find her apparently dead body and place it in a crystal tomb. A prince appears to them and asks to take the coffin with him to his palace. Later, the prince's mother takes off the pearl-studded shirt from Olga's body and she wakes up.

Alexander Afanasyev collected a Russian version titled The Magic Mirror, in which the reason that the heroine has to leave her parents' house is different from the usual. Instead of being the daughter of a king, she is the daughter of a merchant, who's left with her uncle while her father and brothers travel. During their absence, the heroine's uncle attempts to assault her, but she frustrates his plans. To get his revenge he writes a letter to the heroine's father, accusing her of misconduct. Believing what's written in the letter, the merchant sends his son back home to kill his own sister, but the merchant's son does not trust his uncle's letter, and after discovering what's in the letter are lies, he warns her sister, who escapes and is taken in by two bogatyrs. The elements of the stepmother and the mirror are introduced much later, after the merchant returns home believing his daughter is dead and remarries the woman who owns the titular magic mirror, that tells her that her stepdaughter is still alive and is more beautiful than she is. In another Russian version the heroine is the daughter of a Tsar, and her stepmother decides to kill her after asking three different mirrors and all of them told her her stepdaughters is more beautiful than she is. The dwarfs' role is fulfilled by twelve brothers cursed to be hawks, living at the top of a glass mountain.

Arthur and Albert Schott collected a Romanian version titled The Magic Mirror (German: Der Zauberspiegel; Romanian: Oglinda fermecată), in which the villain is the heroine's biological mother. After the titular mirror tells her that her daughter is prettiest, she takes her to go for a walk in the woods and feeds her extremely salty bread, so her daughter will become so thirsty that she would agree to let her tear out her eyes in exchange for water. Once the daughter is blinded her mother leaves her in the forest, where she manages to restore her eyes and is taken in by twelve thieves. After discovering her daughter is still alive, the mother sends an old woman to the thieves' house three times. The first she gives the daughter a ring, the second earrings, and the third poisoned flowers. After the heroine marries the prince, she has a child, and the mother goes to the castle pretending to be a midwife to kill both her daughter and the newborn. After killing the infant, she's stopped before she can kill the heroine.

The Pushkin fairytale The Tale of the Dead Princess and the Seven Knights bears a striking similarity to the tale of Snow White. However, the Dead Princess befriends 7 knights instead of dwarfs, and it is the Sun and Moon who aid the Prince to the resting place of the Dead Princess, where he breaks with his sword the coffin of the Tsarevna, bringing her back to life.

=== Americas ===
In a Louisiana tale, Lé Roi Pan ("The King Peacock"), a mother has a child who becomes more beautiful than she, so she orders her daughter's nurse to kill her. The daughter resigns to her fate, but the nurse spares her and gives her three seeds. After failing to drown in a well and to be eaten by an ogre, the girl eats a seed and falls into a deep sleep. The ogre family (who took her in after seeing her beauty) put her in a crystal coffin to float down the river. Her coffin is found by the titular King Peacock, who takes the seed from her mouth and awakens her. The King Peacock shares "motifs and tropes" with Snow White, according to Maria Tatar.

== Adaptations ==
=== Theatrical live-action adaptations ===
Snow White, 1916, full 63-minute film

- Snow White (1902), a lost silent film made in 1902. It was the first time the classic 1812 Brothers Grimm fairy tale was made into a film.
- Snow White (1916), a silent film by Famous Players–Lasky produced by Adolph Zukor and Daniel Frohman, directed by J. Searle Dawley, and starring Marguerite Clark, Creighton Hale, and Dorothy Cumming.
- Schneewittchen und die sieben Zwerge (1939), German film by Heinz Wolff.
- I sette nani alla riscossa (The Seven Dwarfs to the Rescue) (1951), an Italian film based on the fairy tale.
- Lumikki ja 7 jätkää (The Snow White and the 7 Dudes) (1953), a Finnish musical comedy film directed by Ville Salminen, loosely based on the fairy tale.

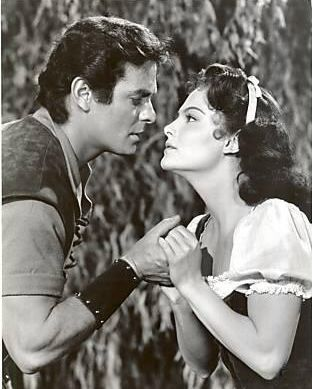
Edson Stroll and Carol Heiss as Prince Charming and Snow White in the retelling film Snow White and the Three Stooges

- Schneewittchen und die sieben Zwerge (1955), a German live-action adaptation of the fairy tale.
- Snow White and the Seven Fellows (1955), a Hong Kong film as Chow Sze-luk, Lo Yu-kei Dirs.
- Snow White and the Three Stooges (1961), starring the Three Stooges with Carol Heiss as Snow White and Patricia Medina as the Evil Queen.
- Snow White (1961), an East German fairy tale film directed by Gottfried Kolditz.
- The New Adventures of Snow White (1969), a West German sex comedy film directed by Rolf Thiele and starring Marie Liljedahl, Eva Reuber-Staier, and Ingrid van Bergen. The film puts an erotic spin on three classic fairy tales Snow White, Cinderella and Sleeping Beauty.
- Pamuk Prenses ve 7 Cüceler (1970), a Turkish live-action remake of the 1937 Disney film.
- Snow White (1987), starring Diana Rigg as the Evil Queen and Nicola Stapleton and Sarah Patterson both as Snow White.
- Schneewittchen und das Geheimnis der Zwerge (1992), a German adaptation of the fairy tale.
- Snow White: A Tale of Terror (1997), starring Sam Neill as Snow White's father, Sigourney Weaver as the Evil Queen, and Monica Keena as Snow White.
- 7 Dwarves – Men Alone in the Wood (7 Zwerge – Männer allein im Wald) (2004), a German comedy film.
- The Brothers Grimm (2005), an adventure fantasy film directed by Terry Gilliam and starring Matt Damon, Heath Ledger, and Lena Headey.
- 7 Dwarves: The Forest Is Not Enough (7 Zwerge – Der Wald ist nicht genug) (2006), sequel to the 2004 German film 7 Dwarves – Men Alone in the Wood.
- Sydney White (2007), a modernization of the story, starring Amanda Bynes.
- Blancanieves (2012), a silent Spanish film based on the fairy tale.
- Mirror Mirror (2012), starring Julia Roberts as the Evil Queen Clementianna, Lily Collins as Snow White, Armie Hammer as Prince Andrew Alcott, and Nathan Lane as Brighton, the Queen's majordomo.
- The Huntsman series:
  - Snow White and the Huntsman (2012), starring Kristen Stewart, Charlize Theron, Chris Hemsworth, and Sam Claflin.
  - The Huntsman: Winter's War (2016), which features Snow White as a minor character.
- White as Snow (2019), starring Lou de Laâge, Isabelle Huppert.
- In the Mirror (2020), an absurdist reinterpretation of the story, starring Madlēna Valdberga.
- Snow White (2025), a reimagining of Disney's 1937 animated version, starring Rachel Zegler as Snow White, Gal Gadot as the Evil Queen, and Andrew Burnap as a new character (replacing the Prince) named Jonathan.
- The Death of Snow White (2025), a horror reimagining of the story, starring Sanae Loutsis as Snow White and Chelsea Edmundson as the Evil Queen.

=== Theatrical animated adaptations ===
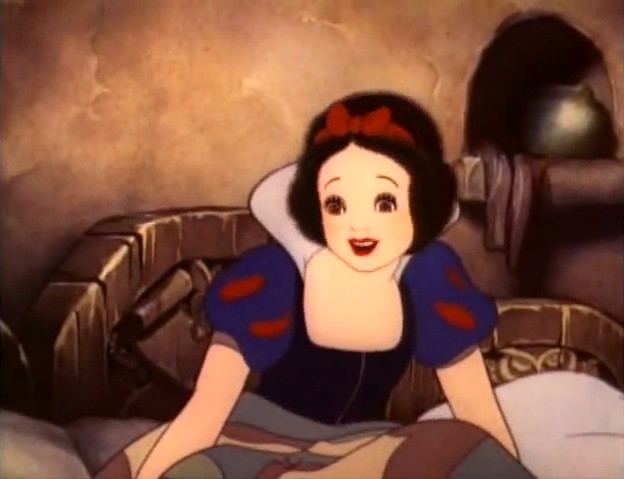
Snow White from Walt Disney's Snow White and the Seven Dwarfs (1937)

- Snow-White (1933), also known as Betty Boop in Snow-White, is a film in the Betty Boop series from Max Fleischer's Fleischer Studios.
- Snow White and the Seven Dwarfs (1937) is an animated film based on the fairy tale, featuring Adriana Caselotti as the voice of Snow White. It is widely considered the best-known adaptation of the story, thanks in part to it becoming one of the first animated feature films and Disney's first animated motion picture.
- Coal Black and de Sebben Dwarfs (1943) is a Merrie Melodies animated cartoon directed by Bob Clampett. The short was released on January 16, 1943. It is a parody of the fairy tale featuring African-American stereotypes and is part of the "Censored Eleven".
- Happily Ever After (1989) is a 1989 American animated musical fantasy film written by Robby London and Martha Moran, directed by John Howley, produced by Filmation.
- Snow White: The Sequel (2007) is a Belgian/French/British adult animated comedy film directed by Picha. It is based on the fairy tale of Snow White and intended as a sequel to Disney's classic animated adaptation. However, like all of Picha's cartoons, the film is actually a sex comedy featuring a lot of bawdy jokes and sex scenes.
- Shrek the Third (2007), animated comedy film, sequel to Shrek 2 (2002). Snow White appears extensively among Princess Fiona's friends.
- The Seventh Dwarf (2014) (German: Der 7bte Zwerg), is a German 3D computer-animated film, created in 2014. The film is based upon the fairy tale Sleeping Beauty and characters from Snow White and the Seven Dwarfs.

=== Direct-to-video live-action adaptations ===
- Neberte nám princeznú (1981) (English: Let the Princess Stay with Us) is a modern version of the Snow White and the Seven Dwarfs fairytale, starring Marika Gombitová. The musical was directed by Martin Hoffmeister, and released in 1981.
- Grimm's Snow White (2012), starring Eliza Bennett as Snow White and Jane March as the Evil Queen Gwendolyn.
- Snow White: A Deadly Summer (2012) is an American horror film directed by David DeCoteau and starring Shanley Caswell, Maureen McCormick, and Eric Roberts. The film was released straight to DVD and digital download on March 20, 2012
- Snow White's Christmas Adventure (2023), starring Jennifer Mischiati as Snow White, with Rayna Campbell and Elijah Rowen.

=== Direct-to-video animated adaptations ===
- Amada Anime Series: Super Mario Bros. (1989), a three-part OVA series featuring Mario characters in different fairy tales.
- Snow White (1990), direct-to-video featurette by American Film Investment Corporation.
- Snow White and the Magic Mirror (1994), produced by Fred Wolf Films Dublin.
- Snow White (1995), a Japanese-American direct-to-video film by Jetlag Productions.
- Snow White (1998), direct-to-video film by Golden Films.
- Rugrats: Tales from the Crib: Snow White (2005), direct-to-video film from the animated series Rugrats, with the characters playing the characters from the fairy tale. This is also the first adaptation of the original fairy tale in which Snow White is depicted as a dark-skinned character (being portrayed by Susie Carmichael).
- Happily N'Ever After 2: Snow White—Another Bite @ the Apple (2009), an American-German computer-animated direct-to-video film and sequel to Happily N'Ever After
- Charming (2018), an animated film featuring Snow White as one of the princesses, featuring the voice of Avril Lavigne.
- Red Shoes and the Seven Dwarfs (2019), a Korean-American animated film based on the fairy tale, featuring the voice of Chloë Grace Moretz.

=== Television live-action adaptations ===
- The Brady Bunch (1973), in the episode "Snow White and the Seven Bradys", the Bradys put on a production of "Snow White and the Seven Dwarfs" in their backyard, with each of the Bradys playing one of the characters.
- El Chapulín Colorado (1978), in the three part episode "Blancanieves y los siete Churi Churín Fun Flais" being crossover with El Chavo del Ocho where Chapulin visits Professor Jirafales' class to narrate the story of Snow White for the children. Snow White is played by Florinda Meza while the Evil Queen is played by María Antonieta de las Nieves.
- Faerie Tale Theatre (1984) has an episode based on the fairy tale starring Vanessa Redgrave as the Evil Queen, Elizabeth McGovern as Snow White, and Vincent Price as the Magic Mirror.
- A Smoky Mountain Christmas (1986) is a retelling of Snow White, except it is set in the Smoky Mountains and there are orphans instead of dwarves.
- Saved by the Bell (1992), in the episode "Snow White and the Seven Dorks", the school puts on a hip hop version of "Snow White and the Seven Dwarfs".
- The 10th Kingdom (2000) is a TV miniseries featuring Snow White as a major character.
- Snow White: The Fairest of Them All (2001), TV movie starring Kristin Kreuk as Snow White and Miranda Richardson as Queen Elspeth.
- Blanche Neige (2009) - France TV movie
- During the episode of The Suite Life on Deck "Once Upon a Suite Life" (2010) is shown a version of the fairy tale with the characters of the series in the roles of the characters from the tale.
- Once Upon a Time (2011) is a TV series featuring Snow White, Prince Charming, their daughter Emma Swan, and the Evil Queen as the main characters.
- Seven and Me (2016) - Italian-French TV series focused on Snow, a modern-day girl who discovers she is a descendant of Snow White after seven dwarfs arrive at her house to be her guardians.

=== Television animated adaptations ===
- Popeye the Sailor - The episode Olive Drab and the Seven Sweapeas, being produced by Jack Kinney Productions and posted on October 10, 1960, is based on the same fairy tale, with Olive Oyl as Snow White, the Sea Hag as the Evil Queen, the seven Swee'Peas as the seven dwarfs and Popeye as Prince Charming. In that same episode, the king's gold is stolen off his boat and the princess Olive is asked to find it by locating "the seven Swee Peas" in the swamp and having them solve the case. After rescuing Olive, who almost drowns trying to find the little ones, the seven Swee Peas head out on their mission. The Sea Hag, of course, is behind the robbery. At least in this "adventure story," the Hag has a clever plan to beat her foes, which is to give the princess a can of cursed spinach.
- Festival of Family Classics (1972–73), episode Snow White and the Seven Dwarfs, produced by Rankin/Bass and animated by Mushi Production.
- Manga Fairy Tales of the World (1976–79), anime anthology series animated by Dax International has a 10-minute adaptation.
- A Snow White Christmas is a Christmas animated television special produced by Filmation and telecast December 19, 1980, on CBS.
- A 1984 episode of Alvin & the Chipmunks called Snow Wrong is based on the fairy tale, with Brittany of The Chipettes as Snow White.
- The Saturday-morning cartoon series Muppet Babies parodied the tale in "Snow White and the Seven Muppets" (1985).
- My Favorite Fairy Tales (Sekai Dōwa Anime Zenshū) (1986), an anime television anthology, has a 30-minute adaptation.
- Grimm's Fairy Tale Classics (1987–89) an anime television series based on Grimm's stories, as a four half-hour episodes adaptation.
- Season 7 of Garfield and Friends had a two-part story parodying the fairy tale called "Snow Wade and the 77 Dwarfs".
- The ALF Tales season 2 episode "Snow White and the Seven Dwarfs" (1989) is a retelling of the tale.
- World Fairy Tale Series (Anime sekai no dōwa) (1995), anime television anthology produced by Toei Animation, has half-hour adaptation.
- Wolves, Witches and Giants (1995–99), special Snow White (1997).
- The Triplets (Les tres bessones/Las tres mellizas) (1997–2003), Catalan animated series, season 1 episode 2 includes the series' protagonists traveling to the "Snow White" tale, but in a time after the events of the original fairy tale, where they meet Snow White's triplet sons, while Snow White's stepmother acts as the episode's main antagonist. Snow White also makes another appearance in the final episode of the series.
- Simsala Grimm (1999–2010), season 2 episode 8.
- Animated webseries Ever After High (2013–2017) based on the same name doll line, features as main characters Raven Queen, daughter of the Evil Queen, and Apple White, daughter of Snow White. The two protagonists' mothers also appear in the Dragon Games special.
- RWBY (2013) is a web series which features characters called "Weiss Schnee" and "Klein Sieben", German for "White Snow" and "Small Seven" (grammatically incorrect, though, since it would be "Weisser Schnee" and "Kleine Sieben").
- In The Simpsons episode "Four Great Women and a Manicure" (2009), Lisa tells her own variation of the tale, with herself as Snow White.
- Revolting Rhymes (2016), TV film based on the 1982 book of the same name written by Roald Dahl featuring Snow White as one of the main characters.
- A 2016 video on the Pudding TV Fairy Tales YouTube channel tells a comical version of the story.
- In the season 14 SpongeBob SquarePants episode "Snow Yellow and the Seven Jellies", SpongeBob acts as Snow Yellow, Karen acts as the Evil Queen, Patrick, Squidward, Mr. Krabs, Sandy, Mrs. Puff, Gary, and Old Man Jenkins act as the Seven Jellies, Plankton acts as the Magic Mirror and Bubble Bass acts as the Huntsman.

=== Music and audio ===
- Schneewittchen (1851), a song by Theodor Storm, set to music by Rudolf Ewald Zingel in 1908 and later by Armin Knab.
- Schneewittchen (1874), a musical composition for female choir by Carl Reinecke.
- Hildegard Quiel (1888-1971) composed incidental music for a theatrical production of Schneewittchen.
- Sonne (2001) is a music video for the song by Neue Deutsche Härte band Rammstein, where the band are dwarfs mining gold for Snow White.
- Charmed (2008), an album by Sarah Pinsker, features a song called "Twice the Prince" in which Snow White realizes that she prefers a dwarf to Prince Charming.
- The Boys (2011), Girls' Generation's third studio album, features a concept photo by Taeyeon inspired by Snow White.
- Hitoshizuku and Yamasankakkei are two Japanese Vocaloid producers that created a song called Genealogy of Red, White and Black (2015) based upon the tale of Snow White with some differences, the song features the Vocaloids Kagamine Rin/Len and Lily.
- John Finnemore's Souvenir Programme S5E1 (2016) features a comedy sketch parodying the magic mirror scene.
- The music video of Va Va Voom (2012) features Nicki Minaj in a spoof of the fairy tale.

=== Literature ===
- German author Ludwig Aurbacher used the story of Snow White in his literary tale Die zwei Brüder ("The Two Brothers") (1834).
- Snow White (1967), a postmodern novel by Donald Barthelme which describes the lives of Snow White and the dwarfs.
- Snow White and the Seven Dwarfs (1971), a poem by Anne Sexton in her collection Transformations, in which she re-envisions sixteen of the Grimm's Fairy Tales.
- Snow White in New York (1986), a picture book by Fiona French set in 1920s New York.
- O Fantástico Mistério de Feiurinha (1986), a fairytale crossover written by Pedro Bandeira where Snow White and her prince are among the main characters. In 2009 it was adapted into the film Xuxa em O Mistério de Feiurinha.
- "Snow White" (1994), a short story written by James Finn Garner, from Politically Correct Bedtime Stories: Modern Tales For Our Life & Times.
- "Snow, Glass, Apples", a 1994 short story written by Neil Gaiman, which all but explicitly rewrites the tale to make Snow White a vampire-like entity that is opposed by the Queen, while the prince is strongly implied to have necrophiliac tastes.
- Black as Night, 2004 novel by Regina Doman set in contemporary New York City.
- Six-Gun Snow White (2013), a novel by Catherynne M. Valente retelling the Snow White story in an Old West setting.
- Three modern-day "adaptations of... popular international fairy tales" were recorded in Puerto Rico. Two named "Blanca Nieves" ("Snow White") and the third "Blanca Flor" ("White Flower").
- Tímakistan (2013), a novel by Andri Snær Magnason, an adaptation of Snow White.
- Boy, Snow, Bird (2014), a novel by Helen Oyeyemi which adapts the Snow White story as a fable about race and cultural ideas of beauty.
- Winter (2015), a novel by Marissa Meyer loosely based on the story of Snow White.
- Girls Made of Snow and Glass (2017), a novel by Melissa Bashardoust.
- Sadie: An Amish Retelling of Snow White (2018) by Sarah Price

=== Opera and ballet ===
- Biancaneve (1940), ballet by Riccardo Zandonai.
- Biancaneve o il perfido candore (1993), opera by Fabrizio De Rossi Re.
- Schneewittchen (1998), a chamber opera based on the drama by Robert Walser, with music by Heinz Holliger.
- Blancanieves (2005), ballet by Emilio Aragón.
- Blanche Neige (2008), ballet by Angelin Preljocaj.
- Blanche-Neige (2011), a family opera by Marius Felix Lange.

=== Theatre ===
- Schneewittchen (1888), a play with music by Engelbert Humperdinck and a libretto by Adelheid Wette.
- Snow White and the Seven Dwarfs (1912), a play by Jessie Braham.
- Snövit (1950), play by Astrid Lindgren.
- Snow White and the Seven Dwarfs (1969) musical by Frank Churchill, Larry Morey, Jay Blackton and Joe Cook. Adaptation of the 1937 Disney film.
- The story of Snow White is a popular theme for British pantomime.

=== Comics ===
- The Haunt of Fear (1953) was a horror comic which featured a gruesome re-imaging of Snow White.
- Prétear (Prétear - The New Legend of Snow-White) is a manga (2000) and anime (2001) loosely inspired by the story of Snow White, featuring a sixteen-year-old orphan who meets seven magical knights sworn to protect her.
- Stone Ocean (2002), the sixth part of the long-running manga series, JoJo's Bizarre Adventure by Hirohiko Araki features Snow White as one of the various fictional characters brought to life by the stand, Bohemian Rhapsody. She also appeared in its anime adaptation.
- Fables (2002–2024) is an adult-target series of comics created by Bill Willingham, which features Snow White as a major character. She also appears in a prequel, 1001 Nights of Snowfall.
- MÄR (Märchen Awakens Romance) is a Japanese manga (2003) and anime (2005) series where an ordinary student (in the real world) is transported to another reality populated by characters that vaguely resemble characters from fairy tales, like Snow White, Jack (from Jack and the Beanstalk) and Dorothy from The Wizard of Oz.
- Snow White with the Red Hair is a manga (2006) and anime (2015) which open with a loose adaptation of the fairy tale, with a wicked prince pursuing a girl with strikingly red hair.
- Junji Ito's Snow White (2014) is a manga by Junji Ito retelling the story with Snow White repeatedly resurrecting from murders at the hands of the Queen.
- Monica and Friends has many stories that parody Snow White. Notably one of the stories "Branca de Fome e os Sete Anões" was adapted into an animated episode.

=== Video games ===
- Snow White: Happily Ever After, a North America-exclusive video game that was released in 1994 for the Super Nintendo Entertainment System.
- Dark Parables (2010–present), a series of computer video games featuring fairy tales. Snow White appears as a recurring character in a few installments.
- The Wolf Among Us (2013), the Telltale Games video game based on the comic book series Fables, with Snow White appearing as one of the main characters.

=== Other ===
- In 1989, the 61st Academy Awards featured Rob Lowe singing a duet with Eileen Bowman, who played an unauthorized portrayal of Disney's Snow White.
- The Pucca Spring/Summer 2011 fashion show was inspired by Snow White and her wicked stepmother, the Queen. The opening model, Stella Maxwell, was dressed as a Lolita-esque modern day Snow White in a hoodie, miniskirt and high heels.
- Joanne Eccles, an equestrian acrobat, won the title of Aerobatic World Champion (International Jumping of Bordeaux) in 2012. She interpreted Snow White during the first part of the event.
- In the doll franchise Ever After High, Snow White has a daughter named Apple White, and the Queen has a daughter named Raven Queen.
- In the Efteling amusement park, Snow White and the dwarfs live in the Fairytale Forest adjoining the castle of her mother-in-law.

== Religious interpretation ==
Erin Heys' "Religious Symbols" article at the website Religion & Snow White analyzes the use of numerous symbols in the story, their implications, and their Christian interpretations, such as the colours red, white, and black; the apple; the number seven; and resurrection.

== See also ==
- The Glass Coffin
- Princess Aubergine
- Sleeping Beauty (a princess cursed into a death-like sleep)
- Snow-White-Fire-Red, an Italian fairy tale
- Snežana, a Slavic female name meaning "snow woman" with a similar connotation to "Snow White"
- Snegurochka, a Russian folk tale often translated as "Snow White"
- Syair Bidasari, a Malay poem with some plot similarities to "Snow White"
- Udea and her Seven Brothers
- The Tale of the Dead Princess and the Seven Knights (Alexander Pushkin's fairy tale in verse form)
