= The Young Slave =

Fairy tale by Giambattista Basile

The Young Slave is an Italian literary fairy tale written by Giambattista Basile in his 1634 work, the Pentamerone.

It is Aarne-Thompson type 709, Snow White; other variants include Bella Venezia and Myrsina. The tale is based in Italy, and is often cited as one of the first Snow White stories to exist.

== Synopsis ==
A few girls compete to see who can jump over a rose bush without touching it. Lilla, the baron's sister, is the last to go. She almost clears the bush, but knocks off a single rose petal, signifying her loss. However, wanting to win, she decides to swallow the petal and claim victory. That night, she becomes pregnant. She confides in her fairy friends about what has happened, confused because she is a virgin, but the fairies tell her not to worry, because it is the rose petal itself that has impregnated her.

Eventually she bears a daughter and names her Lisa. The fairies give Lilla gifts to commemorate the birth, but one twists her ankle and accidentally curses Lisa to die when she is seven. The cause of death will be by Lilla herself combing her daughter's hair and forgetting the comb, causing it to become poisonous and kill her. When Lisa turns seven, the curse becomes true, but Lisa only falls asleep, while Lilla falls ill. The lamenting mother puts Lisa in seven crystal coffins and hides her away in a room. Before she dies, she gives her brother the key to the room and makes him promise not to open it.

He obeys and, eventually, marries. He is always out hunting, and during one of his trips, his wife opens the door and finds the casket. Lisa has continued to age into a beautiful young girl, and the casket grew with her. Jealous of the girl's beauty and believing that her husband would cheat on her with Lisa, the baroness pulls Lisa out by her hair, which knocks out the comb and awakens her. She cuts the girl's hair, dresses her in rags and beats her every day until her husband returns. When her uncle returns, he cannot recognize her as his niece, and his wife takes advantage of this. She claims that her aunt has sent her the girl to be their slave, and that she is not to be loved. She forces the girl to do work around the house and continues to abuse her.

One day, the baron goes to a fair and asks everyone for what they want him to bring back, including Lisa. His wife flies into a jealous rage, stating that she is not to be loved or put on their social level. Lisa then asks for a doll, a knife, and some pumice-stone, and curses him to not be able to cross the river to return if he fails. He indeed forgets them, but when the river swells, it reminds him of her request, and he goes back to buy her items. Lisa takes them to the kitchen and tells her life story to the doll and threatens to sharpen the knife on the stone and kill herself if the doll does not answer. Miraculously, the doll replies "All right, I heard you! I'm not deaf!" Lisa continues this game with her doll over several days, threatening to kill herself with the knife if the doll does not reply.

By chance, the baron hears Lisa speaking to the doll one night. Recognizing the story of the rose bush, he breaks down the door just before Lisa can stab herself with the knife. He asks her to retell the story, and she does, and he instantly knows that she is his niece. He embraces the girl and sends her away from the abusive home to one of his relatives, where she can recover. In a few months' time, Lisa has once again regained her "goddess-like" beauty and is invited back to the home. The baron plans a great banquet for the kingdom and, when the meal is finished, asks Lisa to recount the horrors his wife had put her through. The people at the banquet are horrified and sobbing, angry at the baroness, until finally the baron banishes his wife from his land and out of their lives forever. He finds a handsome, loving husband for his niece of her choosing, and they live happily ever after.

== Analysis ==
=== Tale type ===
Folklorist D. L. Ashliman classified the tale in the Aarne-Thompson-Uther Index as type ATU 709, "Snow White", in his 1987 study of folktales. Similarly, Maria Tatar considered it a version of "Snow White".

On the other hand, scholar Nancy Canepa classified it as type ATU 410, "Sleeping Beauty", and ATU 894, "The Ghoulish Schoolmaster and the Stone of Pity", although she recognized that the story "shared motifs" with "Snow White", e.g., the comb and the glass coffin.

In another line of scholarship, Spanish scholars Julio Camarena and Maxime Chevalier, in their joint Spanish Folktale Index, classified the tale as a new Spanish tale type: 438, "La Hija de la Rosa" (English: "The Daughter of the Rose"). In this type, the heroine's mother either swallows a rose petal, or sleeps beneath a rosebush, thus causing her to become pregnant with the heroine; later in life, the heroine is put to sleep by a magic comb, but wakes up in a prince's castle; at the end of the tale, the heroine tells her woes to a piedra del dolor (or a stone of pity), and tries to kill herself when the prince stops her.

In the same vein, Turkologist Karl Reichl, in Enzyklopädie des Märchens, argued that Basile's story is part of a separate subtype of type ATU 894 that involves the heroine's magical conception, a subtype reported mainly in Italian variants.

== See also ==
- Snow White
- Gold-Tree and Silver-Tree
- La petite Toute-Belle
- The Sleeping Prince (fairy tale)
- The Maiden with the Rose on her Forehead
- The Dead Prince and the Talking Doll
