= Nourie Hadig =

Armenian fairy tale

Nourie Hadig is an Armenian fairy tale collected by Susie Hoogasian-Villa in 100 Armenian Tales and Their Folkloristic Relevance. Her informant was Mrs. Akabi Mooradian, an Armenian living in Detroit.

== Synopsis ==
A rich man had a beautiful wife and a beautiful daughter, Nourie Hadig. Every month, Nourie Hadig's mother asked the new moon if she was the most beautiful. Finally, however, the moon said her daughter was more beautiful. She took to her bed and told the man that he must get rid of her daughter and bring her bloody shirt as proof. Instead of killing the girl, though, the father abandoned Nourie Hadig in the woods.

Nourie Hadig found a house and when she entered it, the door closed behind her. She found rooms full of treasure and a sleeping prince. A voice told her to cook food for the prince for seven years, leaving it beside his bed.

At the next new moon, the moon told Nourie Hadig's mother her daughter was still more beautiful. The wife realized that her daughter had not been killed and was determined to find and murder her. The husband admitted that he had not killed Nourie Hadig but did not know where she was; the wife set out to find her. Every new moon, she asked the moon again about her daughter and heard every time that her daughter was more beautiful.

After four years, gypsies came by the house where Nourie Hadig was. She bought a girl from them, and they both served the prince. At the end of the seven years, the prince woke and because the gypsy girl was tending him, he thought she had served him all seven years, so he decided to marry her. While wedding arrangements were going on, the prince went to town and told Nourie Hadig that since she must have helped some, he would buy her something. She asked for the Stone of Patience. He went to buy it. The stonecutter told him that if one's troubles were great, the stone would swell until it burst from sorrow on hearing them, but if the person made much of a little, the person would swell and burst, and so he must watch and ensure that the servant who asked for it did not burst. He gave Nourie Hadig the stone, and she told it her story. It swelled and was about to burst when the prince broke in and insisted on marrying her rather than the gypsy.

The next new moon, the moon said that the princess of Adana was more beautiful, so the mother knew where her daughter was. She made a beautiful sleep-inducing ring, and had a gypsy take it to her daughter, pleading that she had been out of her mind when she ordered her death. The gypsy girl persuaded the daughter to wear the ring, and as soon as Nourie Hadig had it on her finger, the ring sent her into sleep. The prince refused to bury his wife; he would tend her as she had tended him. Many doctors were unable to heal her, but one tried to steal the ring. She started to come awake; he slid it back on and got the prince to promise him rewards for healing his wife. Then he took the ring off, which awoke Nourie Hadig.

While the ring was on Nourie Hadig's finger, the moon had told the wife that she was the most beautiful one. After the ring was removed, though, it said that Nourie Hadig was. The wife became so angry that she died.

== Analysis ==
=== Tale type ===
The tale is classified in Aarne-Thompson-Uther Index as type ATU 709, "Snow White". Other tales of this type include Snow White, Bella Venezia, Gold-Tree and Silver-Tree, Myrsina, La petite Toute-Belle and The Young Slave.

It also includes an episode in the middle from Aarne-Thompson type 425G, similar to The Sleeping Prince and the frame story of the Pentamerone. The heroine's plight is revealed in the same manner in many more tales, such as The Maiden with the Rose on her Forehead, The Goose Girl, or The Lord of Lorn.

=== Motifs ===
The heroine's name, Nourie Hadig, means a tiny bit of pomegranate.

The tale also includes the motif of "The Stone of Pity" (alternatively, "The Knife of Patience", in some versions), a mark of tale type ATU 894. This also features in The Young Slave, another Snow White variant.
