= La petite Toute-Belle =

Breton fairy tale published in 1900

"La petite Toute-Belle" ("Little Toute-Belle"; Breton: Bihan Holl-Kaer) is a Breton fairy tale published in 1900 by Paul Sébillot in Contes des landes et des grèves.

It is Aarne-Thompson type 709, Snow-White. Others of this type include Bella Venezia, Gold-Tree and Silver-Tree, Myrsina, Nourie Hadig and The Young Slave.

In the tale, a daughter is framed for stealing jewelry from her mother. Her mother orders her death, but wants the death to seem accidental. A female servant pushes the daughter into a well, but the daughter returns unharmed the following day. The mother decides to poison her daughter with sugared almonds, but the daughter is informed that the almonds are poisoned and does not eat them. An evil fairy working for the mother arranges for the girl to wear a poisoned dress. The daughter falls asleep upon donning the dress, but she wakes up when her dress is removed. A king decides to marry the daughter and to execute his new mother-in-law.

== Synopsis ==
A woman has a daughter who is so beautiful that people call her Toute-Belle (Very Beautiful). Her mother is jealous of her beauty. They have a servant, who keeps stealing everything she finds. She hates Toute-Belle, because she tells her mother of her thefts, and eventually convinces Toute-Belle's mother that it is her daughter who steals. When the mother finds that her jewels have been stolen, she promises to reward whoever will rid her of Toute-Belle. The servant says that she will push Toute-Belle into the well and everybody will think she fell in accidentally.

The next day, the servant pretends to see a beautiful flower in the well. Toute-Belle bends over the edge and the servant pushes her, but Toute-Belle finds herself in a pretty room instead of drowning. The room is inhabited by three dragons who ask her how she came. She tells them her stories and they decide to keep her with them.

The next day, the servant goes to the well to draw water and Toute-Belle greets her. She goes to the mother and tells her Toute-Belle is alive. The mother asks an evil fairy how to kill her daughter. The fairy gives her red sugared almonds and says Toute-Belle will die when she eats them. The next morning, the servant gives Toute-Belle the almonds, but when the girl wants to eat them, the dragons come and say they are poisoned.

The mother asks the fairy to kill Toute-Belle, threatening to kill her instead if she does not succeed. The fairy reluctantly gives her a red dress, saying Toute-Belle will die when she slips it on. The following morning, the servant gives Toute-Belle the dress and the girl puts it on, so the dragons will see how pretty she is. But no sooner she slipped on the poisoned dress than rather than killing her, the poison put Toute-Belle to sleep.

When the dragons find her, they think she is dead and put her in a shrine, which they put on the beach. When the tide rises, the shrine floats away and the dragons watch it, crying. When it disappears, they think it has sunk.

The shrine floats until it stops on rocks, near a castle. A young king sees it and asks his servant to bring it to him. When he opens it, he finds Toute-Belle and thinks she is too fresh-looking to be dead, only asleep. He starts a fire in the chimney and tries to wake her up.

The king's mother, who wonders why he stays in his bedroom, thinks he must be ill and asks her maid to look through the keyhole. The maid says she sees the king holding a girl in his arms. The angry queen breaks the door down but when she sees Toute-Belle, she takes pity on her. The maid says the girl is too fresh-looking and pretty to be dead, and that they should take her dress off to warm her up.

As soon as they take off the dress, Toute-Belle wakes from her sleep and tells her story. The king sends for the three dragons, rewards them, and says he will marry Toute-Belle if she agrees. Then he invites Toute-Belle's mother and her servant and asks the mother if she has a marriageable daughter. The mother says she had one, but she died very suddenly. The king confronts her with the truth and condemns her and the servant to be burned at the stake.
