= Bussetti (surname) =

Bussetti is an Italian surname. Notable people with the surname include:

- Marco Bussetti (born 1962), Italian teacher and politician
- Paolo Bussetti, Italian swimmer

== See also ==
- Bussetti
- Bussotti
