= Françoise de Clossey =

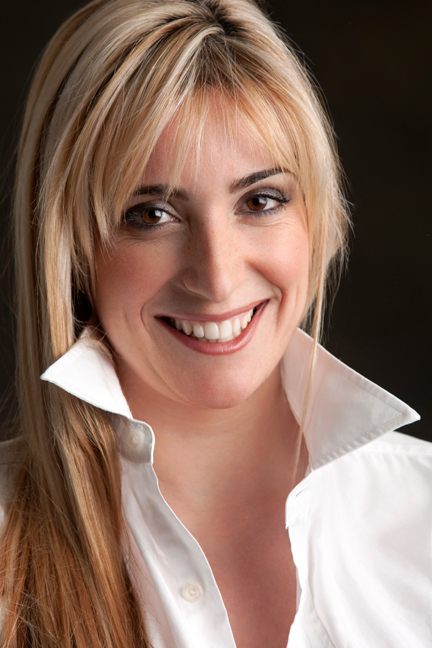

Background information
- Born: October 12, 1974 (age 50); Montreal, Quebec
- Genres: Classical; Cinema
- Occupation(s): pianist, pedagogue
- Instrument: Piano
- Spouse: Mauro Maur

Françoise de Clossey (born October 12, 1974) is a Canadian pianist and organist.

== Biography ==
Françoise de Clossey has to her credit firsts, among which are the world premiere of a work of Henryk Górecki, the first North American performances of works by Salvatore Sciarrino and Sofia Gubaidulina, and the first worldwide performances of the Italian composers Frisina and Sofianopulo. At the beginning of the 21st century, she performed music of Heitor Villa-Lobos, directed by Isaac Karabtchevsky, and has collaborated with the great Brazilian singer and songwriter Gilberto Gil. Her performances of works of North Americans Oscar Peterson, Dave Brubeck, Aaron Copland, George Gershwin, Leonard Bernstein have had great success in duet recitals with Mauro Maur.

Furthermore, Françoise de Clossey has participated in numerous recordings for radio and television. She has played in such important concert halls of the world as the Palacio de Bellas Artes of Mexico, the Kunsthalle of Munich, the Teatro dell'Opera di Roma, the Tchaikovsky Hall of Moscow Conservatory, etc. She has played concerts in Italy, Vatican, France, Belgium, Germany, Spain, England, Switzerland, Luxembourg, Austria, Slovenia, Croatia, Bosnia, Montenegro, Serbia, Spagna, Portugal, Sweden, Russia, Kazakhstan, Turkmenistan, Latvia, Georgia, Hungary, Romania, Czech Republic, Poland, Argentina, Brazil, Bolivia, Peru, Chili, Colombia, Venezuela, Panama, Guatemala, Mexico, Canada, United States, Saudi Arabia, Kuwait, Turkey, Armenia, Lebanon, Tunisia, Libya, Morocco, Eritrea, Ethiopia, Egypt, Nigeria, Gabon, Congo, Zambia, Mozambique, South Africa, Malesia, Thailandia, Singapore, Japan and China.

Born in Montreal, Françoise de Clossey completed the concertist diploma of the University of Montreal under the direction of Professor Natalie Pepin. She later pursued studies in contemporary music with the founder of the NEM, Professor Lorraine Vaillancourt.

Winner of Quebec and Canada music competitions, Françoise de Clossey has appeared as soloist in various international festivals such as those of Montreal, the Festival de Musique de Menton, Festival de la Ville de Paris, The Proms in London, Vatican concerts in Rome and at the Festival Italiano of Munich.

Françoise de Clossey has attended the University of Montreal, the Conservatorio Santa Cecilia in Rome and the MusicaRiva Festival. Recently, she signed an important contract for a series of recordings in duet with Mauro Maur, with whom she has collaborated since 2003 with great public and critical success all over the world, which emphasizes the uniqueness of this duet and the freshness and musicality of its interpretations.

She has been a coach for the Youth Orchestra of the Americas.

== Honours ==
Françoise de Clossey was honoured with the International "Beato Angelico" Prize for the Woman of the year 2006.

Françoise de Clossey received the Prize Oder 2008 for her career.
