= Gold-Tree and Silver-Tree =

Scottish fairy tale

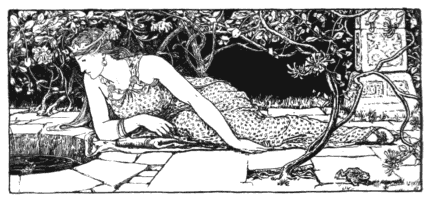

Gold-Tree and Silver-Tree is a Scottish fairy tale collected by Joseph Jacobs in his Celtic Fairy Tales. It is Aarne-Thompson type 709, Snow White. Others of this type include Bella Venezia, Nourie Hadig, La petite Toute-Belle and Myrsina.

== Plot ==
A king had a wife, Silver-Tree, and a daughter, Gold-Tree. One day they walked by a pond, and Silver-Tree asked a trout if she were the most beautiful queen in the world, whereupon the trout said that Gold-Tree was more beautiful. Silver-Tree took to her bed and declared she would never be well unless she ate Gold-Tree's heart and liver. A king's son had asked to marry Gold-Tree, so her father agreed and sent them off; then he gave his wife the heart and liver of a he-goat, at which she got up from her bed.

Silver-Tree went back to the trout, which told her Gold-Tree was still more beautiful, and living abroad with a prince. Silver-Tree begged a ship of her husband to visit her daughter. The prince was away hunting; Gold-Tree was terrified at the sight of the ship. The servants locked her away in a room so she could tell her mother she could not come out. Silver-Tree persuaded Gold-Tree to put her little finger through the keyhole, so she could kiss it, and when Gold-Tree did, Silver-Tree pricked Gold-Tree's finger with a poisoned thorn, causing her to fall asleep.

When the prince returned, he was grief-stricken and could not persuade himself to bury Gold-Tree, because she was so beautiful. He kept her body in a room. Having married for a second time, he would not let his new wife into the room. One day, he forgot the key, and the new wife went in. She tried to wake Gold-Tree and found the thorn in her finger. Pulling it out, she revived Gold-Tree. Because of the wakened one's identity, the second wife offered to leave, but their husband refused to allow it.

Silver-Tree went back to the trout, who told her what had happened. Silver-Tree took the ship again. The prince was hunting again, but the second wife said that the two of them must meet her. Silver-Tree offered a poisoned drink. The second wife said that it was the custom that the person who offered the drink drank of it first. Silver-Tree put the drink to her mouth, and the second wife struck her arm so that some went into her throat. She fell down dead, and Gold-Tree and the second wife lived happily thereafter with the prince.

== Analysis ==
=== Tale type ===
The tale is classified in the international Aarne-Thompson-Uther Index as type ATU 709, "Snow White".

=== Motifs ===
Folklorist Joseph Jacobs commented on variants and motifs of the tale in the Notes of his Celtic Fairy Tales. He suggested the migration of the tale from abroad. He also remarked that publisher and Celtic folklorist Alfred Nutt called Jacobs's attention to the Breton lai of Eliduc.

According to Alan Bruford, Donald A. MacDonald and Christine Shojaei Kawan, the speaking trout in a pool replaces the mirror in Gaelic, Scottish and Irish variants of the tale type ATU 709, as part of the Irish-Scottish oikotype of ATU 709.

== See also ==
- Calumniated Wife
- Snow White and the Seven Dwarfs
- Udea and her Seven Brothers
- Salmon of Knowledge
