= Bussotti =

Bussotti is an Italian surname. Notable people with the surname include:

- Asfò Bussotti (1925–1987), Italian long distance runner
- Joao Bussotti (born 1993), Mozambican-born Italian middle-distance runner
- Sylvano Bussotti (1931–2021), Italian composer of contemporary music

== See also ==
- Bussetti (surname)
