= Marzullo =

Marzullo is a family name of Italian origin. Notable people with the name include:

- Frank Marzullo, American meteorologist
- Gianluca Marzullo (born 1991), Italian-German footballer
- Gigi Marzullo (born 1953), Italian journalist
- J.P. Marzullo, American politician
- Keith Marzullo, American computer scientist

== See also ==
- Marzullo's algorithm
