= Fabrizio De Rossi Re =

Italian composer and librettist

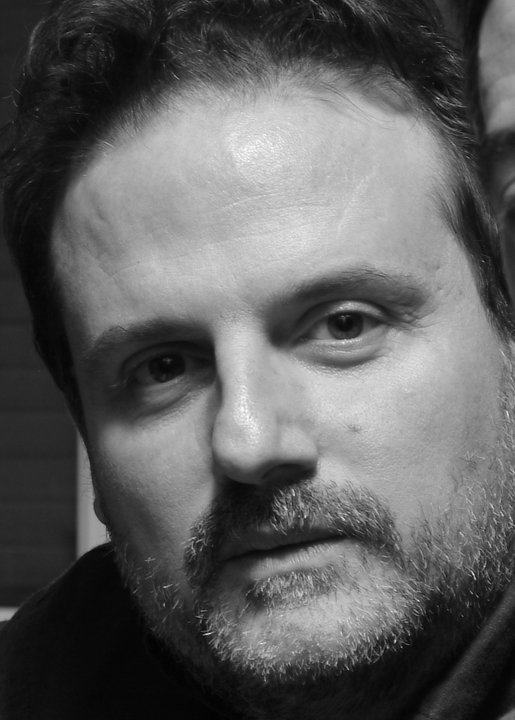
- Born: 1 August 1960 (age 66); Rome, Italy
- Occupations: composer and librettist
- Notable work: King Kong, amore mio Biancaneve, ovvero il perfido candore Cesare Lombroso o il corpo come principio morale

Fabrizio De Rossi Re (born 1 August 1960) is an Italian composer and librettist. He composes operas, symphonic, choral and chamber music, and performs as a pianist.

== Biography ==
De Rossi Re was born in Rome. He studied at the Conservatory of Santa Cecilia in Rome under Mauro Bortolotti and Raffaello Tega. He has also had the chance to meet and study with other important figures of Italian music, such as Sylvano Bussotti, Salvatore Sciarrino, Luciano Berio, and the jazz pianist Umberto Cesari.

He teaches Elements of Composition for Music education at the Conservatory G. B. Pergolesi of Fermo, and has been involved in teaching Didactics of improvisation and composition for High school teachers (organized by the Ministry of Education.)

He has been a member of the artistic association of Nuova Consonanza in Rome since 1987. As a jazz pianist, he often participated in sessions with many other soloists, balancing the heritage of classical music and jazz with the continuous research of new creative paths and sounds.

His works have been recorded by Adda Records, Agenda, BMG Ariola, CNI, Edipan, Fonit Cetra, I Move, QQD, Rai Trade, RCA, Semar, and Sonzogno.

== Selected works ==
Stage

- Biancaneve, ovvero il perfido candore (chamber opera, libretto by the composer, stage-directed by Catherine McGilvray), 1993;
- Nocturnàlia (dance music), 1993;
- Paracelso, from the work Nymphs, Sylphs, Pigmeos, Salamanders and Other Beings (text by the composer, after Paracelsus), 1994;
- L'ombra dentro la pietra (ballet, choreography by Paola Rampone), 1996;
- La comunione dei beni (text by Edoardo Albinati), 1996–1997;
- Cantopinocchio, la fatina che canta (musical action, text by Adriano Vianello), 1997;
- La stanza del corpo dipinto (performance), 1999;
- Cesare Lombroso o il corpo come principio morale (musical action, text by Adriano Vianello), 2000;
- Négritude (for female voice, and 2 actors), 2001;
- Il canto dell'odio (grotesque monologue, text by Lorenzo Stecchetti), 2002;
- Musica senza cuore (grotesque, texts by Francesca Angeli, Paola Cortellesi, after Edmondo De Amicis's novel Heart), 2003;
- Mysterium Cosmographicum, un viaggio nei sogni e nei ricordi di Keplero (musical action, text by Francesca Angeli, after Johannes Kepler), 2004;
- Radiopanico (breve notturno lunare, text by Carlo Lucarelli), 2005;
- King Kong, amore mio (Grotesque and sentimental opera, libretto by Luis Gabriel Santiago), 2011.

Orchestral, choral

- Grandebanda, symphonic band, 1984;
- Nero, nero, piano, string orchestra, 1984;
- Nero, nero II, piano, string orchestra, 1984;
- Lauda (text by Elio Pecora), mezzo-soprano, mixed chorus, flute, cello, piano, orchestra, 1990;
- Aria di strèpito, tenor saxophone, orchestra, 1992;
- Épaves I, 11 strings, 1992;
- Spaventàti dalla tempesta, 1992;
- Concerto, harp, orchestra, 1998;
- Imaginary Portrait, 2 oboes, bassoon, 2 French horns, string orchestra, 1998
- Iguanas (divertimento, text by Edoardo Albinati), 4 mixed voices, 1999;
- Terra trémuit, tenor, mixed chorus, orchestra, 1999;
- Imaginary Portrait, version for 4 French horns, 4 trumpets, 3 trombones, string orchestra, 2000;
- An Imaginary Portrait (il vero antico, il nuovo falso), ancient-instrument orchestra, 2000;
- Slow Dance, accordion, orchestra (tribute to Giuseppe Verdi), 2001;
- Rappresentatione (Urbs Imaginaria), 2 female voices, 2 male voices, mixed chorus, ancient-instrument ensemble, orchestra, tape, live electronics, 2003;
- Valse, small orchestra (16 players), 2005.
- Ricercari (for the String quartet of the Berlin Philharmonic)
- The Bridge (melologue for actor and string quartet, text by Ambrose Bierce), 2011.

Chamber music

- Erato, amore mio (Erato, My Love) for viola and piano, 2001
- Krono e gli altri dèmoni e dèi (Cronus and the Other Demons and Gods) for clarinet and viola, 1987
- Palus Epidemiarum for viola, cello and double bass, 1988

Chamber, radio

- Terranera (radiofilm, text by Valerio Magrelli, directed by Giorgio Pressburger), 1994;
- Orti di guerra (text by Edoardo Albinati), 1995;
- Diario giapponese I (for male voice and percussion), 1997;
- Tre per una, per non dire l'Ernani (text by Vittorio Sermonti), soprano, male speaker, clarinet, piano, 2001.

== Discography ==
- Appunti dal nero. Alicia Terzián/Grupo Encuentros de Música Contemporánea (ADDA Records: CCS 590014)
- Lacus Fulminis. Alter Ego (BMG/Ariola: CCD 3007)
- Spaventàti dalla tempesta. Flavio Emilio Scogna/Orchestra Sinfonica Abruzzese (BMG Ricordi: 74321.17516)
- A Bop be bounce. Alter Ego (BMG Ricordi: 74321.16229)
- Terranera, un viaggetto nel proto-Lazio; Paracelso, dal trattato delle Ninfe, Silfi, Pigmei, Salamandre ed altri esseri. Roberto Fabbriciani, flute (Edizioni Edi.Pan: 3057)
- Vampyr. Federico Mondelci, alto saxophone (BMG Ricordi: 74321.25171)
- Cain (a mystery). Manuel Zurria, flute (Edizioni Edi.Pan: 3039)
- Quarto nero (visione dell'Angelo). Mauro Maur, trumpet; Luigi Celeghin, organ (BMG Ricordi: 74321.16825)
- Terra trémuit. Francesco Marcacci, tenor; Fabio Maestri/chorus and orchestra of the Sagra Musicale Umbra (Octacorda/Sonzogno)
- Ritratto dell'artista da giovane. Toni Germani, alto saxophone; Bernardino Penazzi, cello; Fabrizio De Rossi Re, piano, melodica; Mauro Orselli, percussion (IREC: DDQ 128039)
- Songs and Ricercari.
