= Dashow =

Dashow is a surname. Notable people with the surname include:

- James Dashow (born 1944), American composer
- Ken Dashow (born 1958), American writer, performer, and director
