= Mortari =

Mortari is a surname. Notable people with the surname include:

- Cláudio Mortari (1948–2025), Brazilian basketball player and coach
- Daniele Mortari (born 1955), Italian (later naturalized American) engineer
- Virgilio Mortari (1902–1993), Italian composer
