= Myrsina =

Greek fairy tale collected by Georgios A. Megas in Folktales of Greece

Myrsina (Greek: Η Μυρσίνη) or Myrtle (Greek: Μυρτιά) is a Greek fairy tale collected by Georgios A. Megas in Folktales of Greece. Other variants were collected by Anna Angelopoulou.

It is Aarne-Thompson type 709, Snow White, though substituting many motifs: sisters for the stepmother, the Sun for the magic mirror, abandonment in the woods for an attempt to kill, and the Months for dwarves. Others of this type include Bella Venezia, Nourie Hadig, Gold-Tree and Silver-Tree. and La petite Toute-Belle.

== Synopsis ==
Myrsina is the youngest of three orphaned sisters. Three times, the sun declares that she is the most beautiful. Her jealous sisters tell her it is time to honor their mother with a memorial, or to rebury her. They make the traditional food, go to her grave in the forest, and exclaim they have forgotten the shovel and so cannot plant flowers, or dig her up to rebury her. The two oldest must go back for it, and Myrsina watch the food. In the evening, Myrsina realizes they will not return and cries. This wakes the trees, and one tells her to roll her bread down the hill and follow it. She does and lands in a pit, wherein is a house. She hides there and does the housework while the owners, the Months, are about. The Months wonder who is doing it until the youngest stays behind and hides. He catches her, and the Months take her as their sister.

Word reaches Myrsina's sisters. They come to her with a poisoned cake, claiming to have been unable to find her. She gives part of the cake to the dog, and it dies. When the sisters hear Myrsina is still alive, they come back; she will not open the door to them, but they claim to have a beautiful but poisoned ring that their mother said must be given to Myrsina. She could not defy her mother's wishes; when Mysina slid the ring onto her finger, the ring's poison took effect, and she fell asleep. The Months returned, lamented her, and put her body in a golden chest.

A prince came by, and they gave him their best room, so that he saw the chest. He pleaded for it, and they finally gave it to him on the condition that he never open it. He became ill and did not want to die without knowing what was in the chest; he opened it, wondered at Myrsina, and thought the ring might reveal to him who she was. He took it off, and Myrsina awoke. Myrsina had the ring thrown into the sea and married the prince. One day, her sisters came to harm her, and the prince had his soldiers deal with them.
