= Blanche Neige =

2009 film

- Directed by: Angelin Preljocaj
- Starring: See below
- Theme music composer: Gustav Mahler
- Countries of origin: France; Germany

Original release
- Release: 25 December 2009

Blanche Neige is a contemporary ballet production of Snow White by Angelin Preljocaj with the music of Gustav Mahler.

== Film version ==
Preljocaj directed a filmed version of the ballet in 2009.

=== Film cast ===
- Isabella Arnaud
- Gaëlle Chappaz
- Sergio Díaz
- Caroline Finn
- Céline Galli
- Jean-Charles Jousni
- Lorena O'Neill
- Nagisa Shirai
- Jean-Paul Gaultier
- Nicolas Cambois
- Angelin Preljocaj
