= Ronchetti =

Ronchetti is a surname. Notable people with the surname include:

- Giancarlo Ronchetti (1913–1991), Italian bobsledder
- Liliana Ronchetti (1927–1974), Italian basketball player
- Lucia Ronchetti (born 1963), Italian composer

== See also ==
- Ronchetti Cup
