= Farace =

Farace is a surname. Notable people with the surname include:

- Anthony Farace (born 1976), American soccer player
- Costabile Farace (1960–1989), American mobster
- Luigi Farace (1934–2018), Italian politician
