= Siete Iglesias de Trabancos =

Coordinates: 41°21′N 5°11′W

Siete Iglesias de Trabancos, Spain
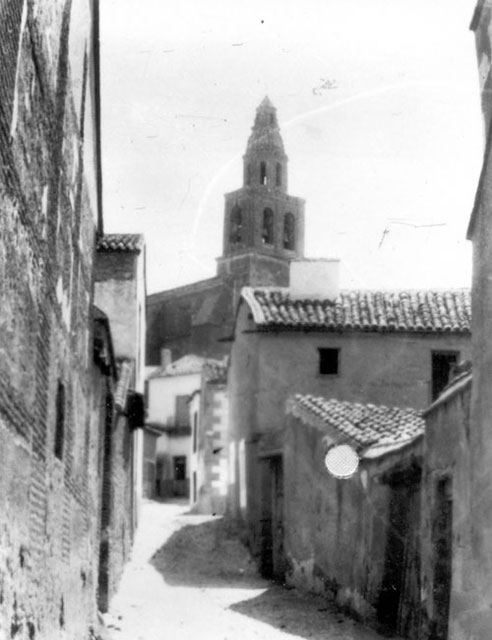
- church
- Country: Spain
- Autonomous community: Castile and León
- Province: Valladolid
- Municipality: Siete Iglesias de Trabancos

Area
  - Total: 61 km^{2} (24 sq mi)

Population (2025-01-01)
  - Total: 413
  - Density: 6.8/km^{2} (18/sq mi)
- Time zone: UTC+1 (CET)
  - Summer (DST): UTC+2 (CEST)

Siete Iglesias de Trabancos (English: Seven Churches of Trabancos) is a municipality in the province of Valladolid, Castile and León, Spain. According to the 2004 census (INE), the municipality has a population of 561 inhabitants.
