= Bella Venezia =

Italian fairy tale

"Bella Venezia" is an Italian fairy tale collected by Italo Calvino in his Italian Folktales. Calvino selected this variant, where the heroine meets robbers, rather than others that contain dwarfs, because he believed the dwarfs were probably an importation from Germany. It is Aarne-Thompson type 709, Snow White. Others of this type include Gold-Tree and Silver-Tree, Nourie Hadig, La petite Toute-Belle, and Myrsina.

== Synopsis ==
An innkeeper named Bella Venezia asked her customers whether they had ever seen a more beautiful woman than herself. When they said they had not, she cut the price for their stay in half, but one day, a traveler said that he had seen such a woman: her own daughter. Bella Venezia doubled the price of his stay instead of halving it; and had her daughter shut in a tower with a single window.

But the daughter escaped and wandered until she saw twelve robbers order a cave open and shut: "Open up, desert!" and "Close up, desert!" She snuck inside and cleaned up the place, and then stole some of their food before hiding. The robbers set watch, but each robber waited outside, for the person to sneak in, and so did not catch her, until the chief robber waited inside and saw her. He told her not to be afraid: she could stay and be their little sister. But one day a robber went to Bella Venezia's inn and told her that a girl they had with them was more beautiful than Bella.

A witch begged every day from the inn, and Bella Venezia promised her half her fortune if she could put an end to the daughter. The witch went into the forest as a peddler, persuaded her daughter to let her in, and while showing her a hair pin, thrust it into her daughter's head, causing her to fall asleep. The robbers found her body, and thinking her dead, they wept and buried her in a hollow tree.

One day, a prince went hunting, and his dogs sniffed out the tree where the girl was buried. He took her body back to the castle and could not bear to be away from her because she was so beautiful. His mother was angry and said that he could at least fix her hair. When he does so, the pin was revealed. When he pulled it out, the girl awoke, and the prince married her.

== See also ==
- Ali Baba
- Snow White
- Udea and her Seven Brothers
