= Indrapuri =

Indrapuri may refer to:

== India ==
- Indore, a major city in central India in Madhya Pradesh, formerly known as Indrapuri
- Indrapuri, Bhopal, a locality in Bhopal, Madhya Pradesh, India
- Indrapuri, Patna, Bihar, India
- Indrapuri Barrage, Bihar, India
- Indrapuri railway station, Delhi India
- Indrapuri Studio, film studio in Kolkata, West Bengal, India

== Indonesia ==
- Indrapuri, Aceh Besar, a district in Aceh Besar Regency, Aceh, Indonesia
- Indrapuri Old Mosque, a 17th-century mosque in Aceh Province, Indonesia

== See also ==
- Indrapura (disambiguation)
- Indrapur (disambiguation)
- Indore (disambiguation)
