= Shivpuri, Patna =

Shivpuri SheoPuri
- Neighbourhood
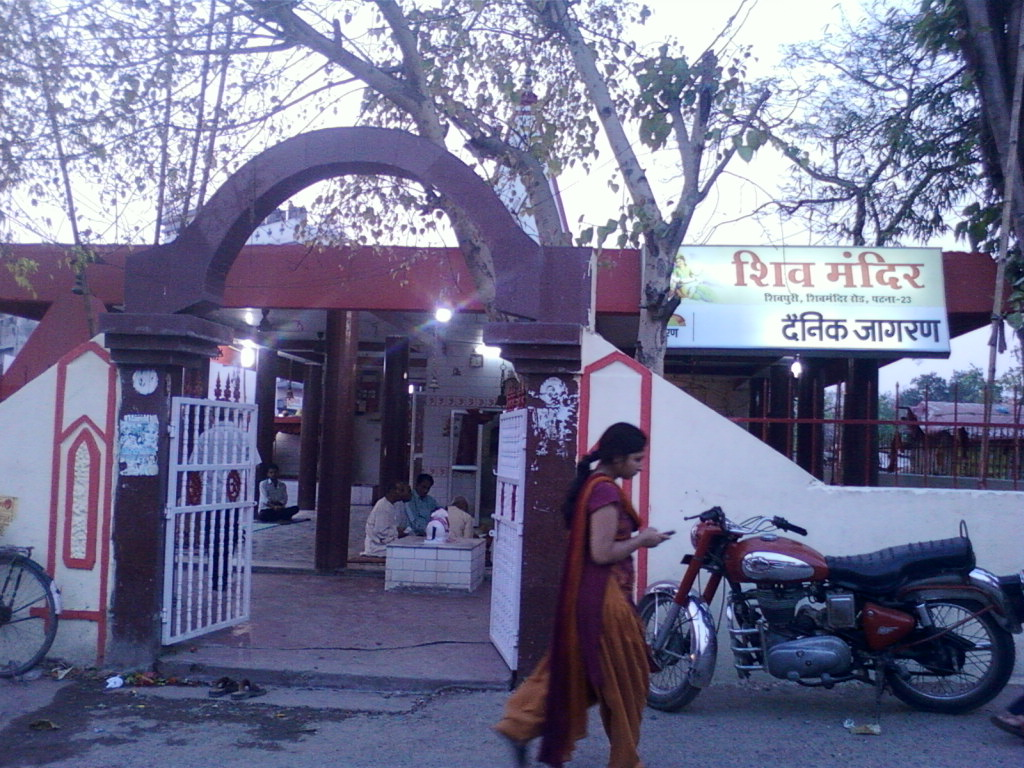
- Shiv Mandir, Shivpuri Main Market
- Nickname: Dhakanpura
- Location in Patna, India
- Coordinates: 25°36′47.19″N 85°6′34.60″E
- Country: India
- State: Bihar
- Metro: Patna
- Named for: Shiva Temple (Shiv Mandir)

Area
  - Total: 1.70 km^{2} (0.66 sq mi)
  - Density: 1.7/km^{2} (4.4/sq mi)
- Demonym: Shivpuriyan (tentative)

Languages
  - Spoken: Hindi, Magadhi
- Time zone: UTC+5:30 (IST)
- Postal code: 800 023
- Vehicle registration: BR01
- Planning agency: Patna Regional Development Authority
- Civic agency: Patna Municipal Corporation
- Ward councillor: Mr. Jai Prakash Sahni, Current Ward Parsad: Shri Amar Kumar
- Ward Number: 07
- Website: patna.nic.in

Shivpuri is a neighbourhood in Patna, capital of Bihar, India.

== Geography ==
Shivpuri is located in the central part of Patna, the capital city of Bihar, India. It extends from A. N. College in the north to BSEB Colony Patel Nagar in the south. To its east lie Mohanpur and Punaichak, while to the west are Patel Nagar, Indrapuri, and Mahesh Nagar.

The locality derives its name from the Shiv Mandir (a temple dedicated to Lord Shiva) situated at the entrance near A. N. College, just beyond the railway crossing (now Atal Path). Another notable place of worship is the Radha Krishna Sai Mandir, which attracts thousands of devotees every Thursday. Near the Sai Mandir, a large mural of Lord Buddha in a seated posture can be seen on the front wall of a building named Siyaram Sadan. Other long-established institutions include Tarang Press, Marigold Convent School, and HRDT School.

Some of the prominent landmarks in the locality are:

North: The Hanuman Mandir, located opposite the Gyan Ganga Building. South: C. P. Thakur Path, where the old Canada Bhawan is situated. East: Shrikanta Bhawan, regarded as one of the oldest Kayastha community buildings on the eastern side of Shivpuri.

== Places of interest ==
Sai mandir in the campus of Radha Krishna Mandir, Shiv Mandir at Shiv Market, Vishwakarma Temple at Shivpuri Railway Halt, Relation Store, Sumant medical hall and The Subzi Mandi are the chief attractions of Shivpuri. A painting of sitting Buddha under bodhi tree is depicted on a building named Siyaram Sadan in RKM road

== Transport ==
Shivpuri is connected to the rest of Patna primarily through road networks. Previously, the locality was served by the Digha–Patna Junction railway line, providing suburban rail connectivity. However, this railway track has been converted into the Atal Path, a major urban road corridor that runs through the area, offering direct connectivity between R-Block and Digha.

The construction of the Digha–Patna six-lane elevated road has further improved access to important city destinations such as Bailey Road, High Court, Gandhi Maidan, and Kankarbagh.

From Pani Tanki Chowk, numerous auto-rickshaws operate throughout the day, connecting Shivpuri to Patna Junction, Bailey Road, and nearby localities. City buses and shared vehicles are also available from Pani Tanki and Gandhi Murti. In addition, app-based and private cab services operate extensively in the area.

== Demographics ==
Shivpuri, one of the prominent and busy urban localities of Patna, is situated close to Boring Road, one of the city's major commercial and residential corridors. Over the decades, it has developed into a well-established neighbourhood known for its mix of traditional residences, educational institutions, and modern commercial complexes.

Residents of Shivpuri come from diverse professional and cultural backgrounds, creating a peaceful yet vibrant community atmosphere. In recent years, the locality has witnessed rapid urbanization — with the emergence of shops, offices, and multi-storey apartment buildings. Two marriage and convention halls further add to the area's growing infrastructure.

The steady development has generated employment opportunities in various sectors, improving the local economy and quality of life.

== Economy ==
Shivpuri has a printing press industry as there are 5-6 printers located here. There is also a Carbon Paper Factory in Shivpuri. But the central business point is the Shivpuri market which consists of the Subzi Mandi and other markets of all types of shops.

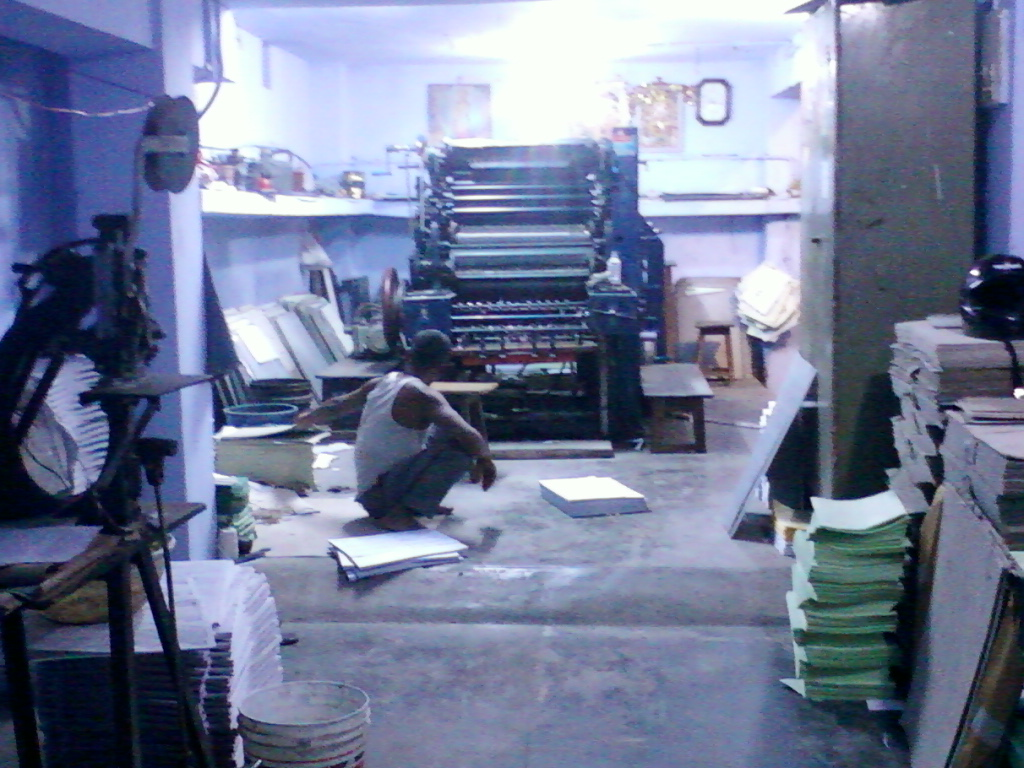
Carbon factory

== Education ==
There are several educational institutions in and around Shivpuri, catering to students from primary to higher education levels. Within the locality, there are around four to five private schools, among which H.R.D.T. Public School is considered the most prominent, providing comprehensive academic education. Other schools include Sunshine Public School, R. S. Academy, and the Government Primary School.

Nearby affiliated schools include D.A.V. Public School (B.S.E.B. Colony), International School, Rose Bud School, K. B. Sahay High School, and Shastri Nagar Girls’ High School, all of which are easily accessible to students from Shivpuri.

For higher education, institutions include A. N. College, Patna Women's College, and J. D. Women's College, which are among the leading colleges in the city and serve as preferred options for students after completing their +2 studies.

== Social organisations ==
Baba Bateshwar Sewa Sansthan is actively involved in various community welfare activities and is known for its commendable social service work for the residents of Shivpuri. Another prominent organization, Pragya Samiti, organizes the annual Saraswati Puja and other cultural programs that bring together people from all sections of society.

In addition, Lama Seva Sansthan, a locally established social organization, conducts charitable activities such as health awareness camps, educational assistance programs, and cleanliness drives aimed at improving community life and promoting social harmony in the area.

Like many rapidly developing urban localities, Shivpuri has faced occasional law and order challenges in the past. Reports of local group conflicts, sometimes referred to as gang rivalries, have been noted; however, with increased police vigilance and community cooperation, the situation has improved significantly in recent years.

== Culture ==
The majority of residents in Shivpuri are Hindus, and the locality is known for its strong sense of community and cultural harmony. The population largely comprises families from educated and service-oriented backgrounds, with many belonging to traditional upper-caste communities of Patna.

Festivals such as Chhath Puja, Durga Puja, Saraswati Puja, and Chitraguptavanshi Kayastha are celebrated with devotion and collective participation. On auspicious occasions like marriages or housewarming ceremonies, it is customary for residents to invite the entire lane or neighborhood, a long-standing tradition that represents the unity and social bonding among the people of Shivpuri.

Over the years, this sense of togetherness has remained a defining feature of the locality, even as urbanization and modern housing patterns have gradually changed its demographic composition.

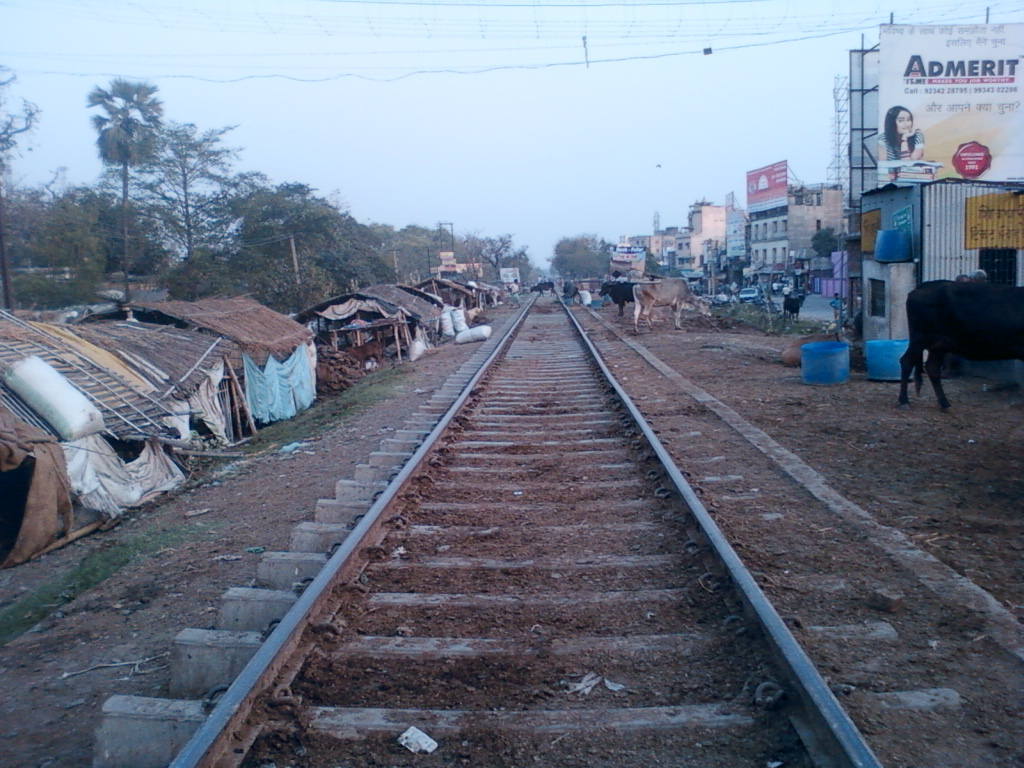
Shivpuri Railway Track

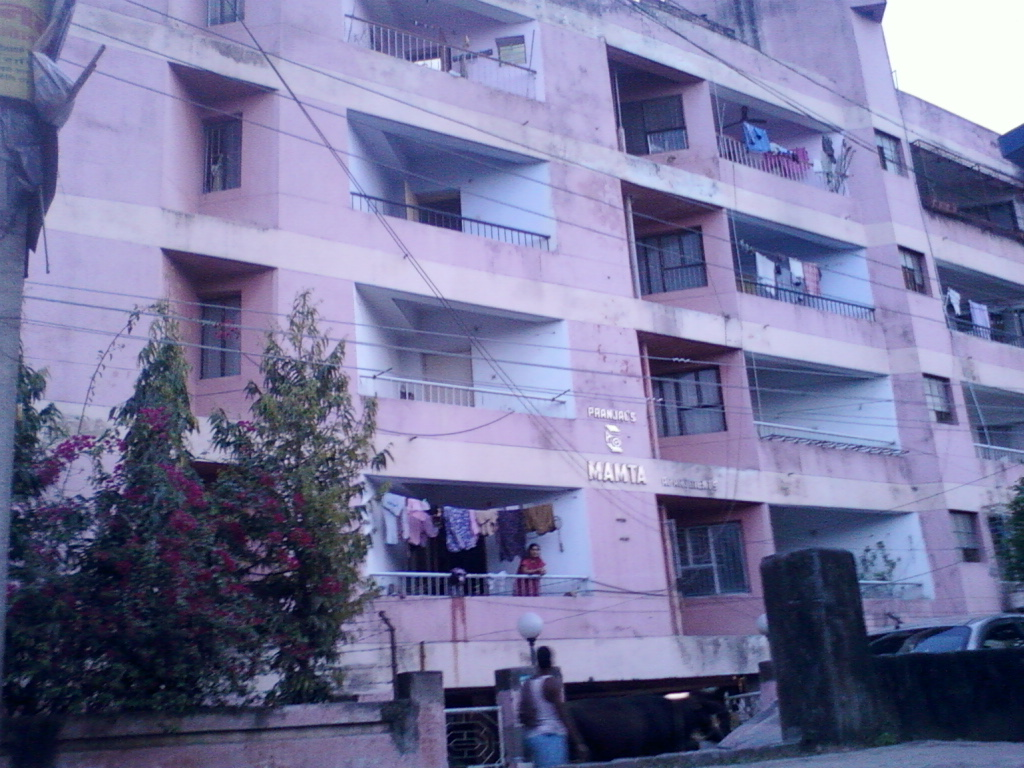
Mamta apartment

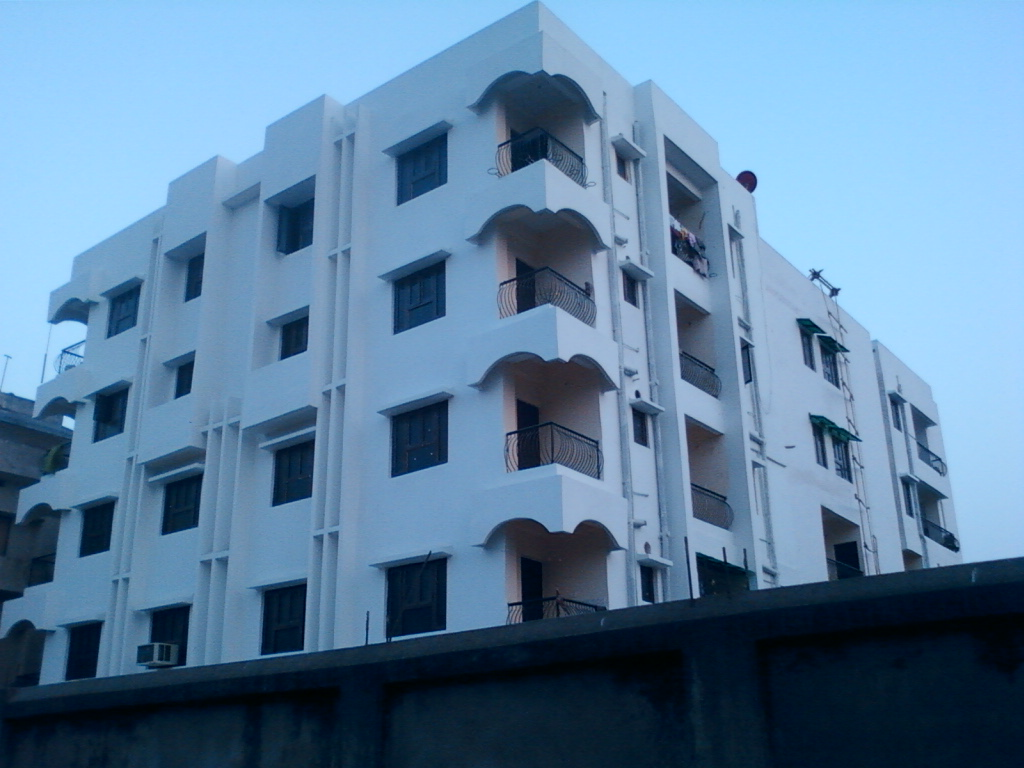
Madhuri Enclave, a newly erected apartment of shivpuri
