= "Philippines, Province of China" banners =

Philippines, province of China, banners
- A visual representation of the banners as they appeared in Metro Manila in July 2018
- Date: July 12, 2018
- Location: Various parts of Metro Manila
- Type: Tarpaulin banner installation
- Motive: Unknown, suspected to be a satirical attack on the government of the Philippines or a protest against the foreign policy of the Philippines on China under the administration of Rodrigo Duterte
- Outcome: Banners dismantled

On July 12, 2018, tarpaulin banners containing the phrase "Welcome to the Philippines, Province of China" were discovered in various parts of Metro Manila. The date also marks the second anniversary of the South China Sea Arbitration, an international arbitration case that ruled against the legality of the People's Republic of China's claims over the South China Sea.

== Background ==
=== Banner description ===
The tarpaulin banners were red and features the Flag of the People's Republic of China flanked with two dragons. It also displays the text "Welcome to the Philippines, Province of China" in white letters presenting the Southeast Asian country as a province of the People's Republic of China. It also features Chinese text in yellow characters below the English text which loosely translates to "Welcome to China's Philippines". Traditional Chinese characters were used in the banners which are not used widely in mainland China.

The banners' text appears as a possible reference to a joke made by Philippine President Rodrigo Duterte of offering the country as a province of its larger northern neighbor in a forum of Chinese Filipino businessmen in February 2018.

No group or individual has claimed responsibility for the banners.

=== Public display ===
==== Installation ====
The tarpaulin banners were reportedly seen hanging on footbridges in various parts of Metro Manila on July 12, 2018, exactly two years since the Permanent Court of Arbitration ruled in favor of the Philippines regarding the Philippines v. China arbitration case concerning China's nine dash-line claim over the South China Sea. The international court has ruled the claim as having no legal basis. The government under the administration of President Rodrigo Duterte decided to set aside the ruling to improve economic and political ties with the People's Republic of China.

At the time when the banners were publicly installed, a Chinese delegation is present in Metro Manila for an annually held incentive tour though delegates were not scheduled to pass through the area where the banners were installed.

Banners were reportedly hung on sides of pedestrian footbridges on:

- Commonwealth Avenue, Quezon City
- Quezon Avenue, Quezon City
- C-5 road southbound
- Near Ninoy Aquino International Airport, Pasay

==== Removal ====
The tarpaulins were later removed on the same day by the Metropolitan Manila Development Authority (MMDA) in cooperation with concerned local government units and the police since the MMDA did not give permission for the banners' installation on footbridges.

== Responses ==
=== Philippine government ===
The Philippine government through then-Presidential spokesperson Harry Roque has alleged that enemies of the government were behind the installation of the banners adding that the government has "nothing to gain" by doing such. He speculated that the act of installing the banners was a means of provocation to push a claim that the national government has given up its territory and insists that the administration of President Rodrigo Duterte will continue to assert the country's sovereignty and sovereign rights. Roque has also said that the Duterte administration's friendly approach towards China despite the ongoing disputes in the South China Sea has lessened tensions in the region and gave way for confidence building talks between the ASEAN and China.

=== Chinese embassy ===
Zhao Jianhua, China's ambassador to the Philippines, said the Philippines will never be "any part of China" and called the installation of the banners as a "vicious attack" on the bilateral relations of China and the Philippines.

=== Others ===
There were mixed response regarding the banners in social media from both supporters and critics of the Philippine government. Supporters alleged that the banners were an attack on the government. There was speculation that the banners was a satirical response to the Duterte administration's policy in dealing with China.

Edwin Lacierda, presidential spokesperson of Rodrigo Duterte's predecessor Benigno Aquino III, while hailing the previous administration's efforts in the Philippines v. China case, expressed disbelief regarding the banners.

Florin Hilbay, former Solicitor General who played a key role in the Philippines v. China arbitration case, called the banners a creative form of protest and says that these were reflective on how the Philippine government's policy towards China drastically changed in just two years while urging the government to assert the country's sovereignty against what he calls China's militarization of the South China Sea.

== In Cambodia ==
In February 2021, during the Lunar New Year, a modified image of a banner spread on Facebook with its text altered to read "Welcome to the [sic] Cambodia – Province of China". Fact Crescendo debunked the claim by cross-referencing images of the original banner in Metro Manila, as reported by Deutsche Welle and The Philippine Star in 2018.

== See also ==
- Chinese social media claim on Palawan
