= Food Delivery (film) =

- CinePanalo poster
- Directed by: Baby Ruth Villarama
- Produced by: Chris Cahilig; Ivy Zharisse Piedad; Ferdinand Lapuz; Chuck Gutierrez
- Cinematography: Nana Buxani; Ivan Torres; Glenn de Guzman
- Edited by: Chuck Gutierrez
- Music by: Emerzon Texon
- Production company: Voyage Studios
- Release dates: June 30, 2025 (New Zealand); July 27, 2025 (Philippines)
- Running time: 83 minutes
- Country: Philippines
- Language: Filipino

Food Delivery: Fresh from the West Philippine Sea is a 2025 Philippine documentary film. Directed by Baby Ruth Villarama under Voyage Studios, the film covers the plight of Filipino fishermen, navy, and coast guard personnel in the contested South China Sea, despite China's obstruction of their activities.

Originally set to be released in March 2025 as part of Puregold's CinePanalo Film Festival in Quezon City, the film was withdrawn from the event. Its subject matter was seen as the reason for its withdrawal from Puregold's film festival. It was later released on June 30, 2025, in Auckland as part of the DocEdge Festival in New Zealand. The film was subject to overseas censorship attempts by the government of the People's Republic of China.

The film has had limited theatrical screenings in the Philippines since July 27, 2025, and was presented in Dolby Vision and Dolby Atmos.

== Production ==
=== Development ===
Food Delivery was directed by Baby Ruth Villarama under Voyage Studios. Chuck Gutierrez was the editor and producer. As a former CinePanalo Film Festival entry, its production was funded by Puregold, a supermarket chain brand owned by the Chinese-Filipino Co family.

Gutierrez asked Villarama to make a pitch for a film for a CinePanalo entry. Puregold's sponsorship gave Villarama an idea to center her film concept on "food", leading her to research on the plight of Filipino fishermen in the South China Sea, which is subject to a territorial dispute claimed in whole by China. Villarama also tackled the difficulties of the Armed Forces of the Philippines' efforts to deliver supplies to Filipino soldiers stationed in the contested islands.

The film had West Philippine Sea in its name, which refers to the eastern portion of the South China Sea that the Philippines claims sovereignty over. Villarama is motivated by supporting the Philippines' claim in the area and countering China's own sovereignty claims and tactics to dissuade Filipino fishers from the sea. Villarama insists despite the political nature of the film, Food Delivery is about "empathy" meant to connect its audience to the plight of its subjects.

=== Filming ===
Principal photography took place from October to December 2024, with the production crew joining Filipino fisherfolk doing their work in the South China Sea. The filming was non-continuous, consisting of several trips ranging from five days to two weeks. They also filmed with Filipino troops stationed near the sea in January 2025.

The film covers both the plight of the Filipino fisherfolks and the Philippine Coast Guard and Navy's resupply efforts despite China's opposition to their presence.

One of the resource persons for the documentary was Subic-based fisherman Arnel Satam, who operates a small motorized wooden boat. He recounts being driven away by the China Coast Guard from his usual fishing waters in 2023 as well as the simbada fishing tradition within his community.

The crew also covered the Philippine Coast Guard and the Filipino local fisherfolk community's search for the four fishermen of the FB Reincris who went missing on November 27, 2024, within the vicinity of the Scarborough Shoal.

== Release ==
=== CinePanalo Film Festival and withdrawal ===
Food Delivery was announced as one of the eight official entries of the 2nd CinePanalo Film Festival by Puregold in September 2024. It would have been the first documentary to feature in the film festival to run from March 14 to 25, 2025 at the Gateway Mall in Quezon City. The film's CinePanalo release were to have English subtitles for the foreign jurors invited and the Movie and Television Review and Classification Board has given the film a PG rating.

However, on March 12, 2025, Food Delivery director Villarama and Festival director Chris Cahilig issued a joint statement about the film being withdrawn from the event. The statement claims it is a joint decision from the organizers and film creators but admitted to unnamed "external factors" influencing the move. The organizers of the CinePanalo told that whole film festival is at risk of being cancelled if Food Delivery was not withdrawn.

Villarama admitted the withdrawal felt like censorship and speculated it was due to "political and economic pressures" from China. She later disclosed that the film was withdrawn at the request of Puregold's board of directors.

The Directors' Guild of the Philippines expressed disappointment over the censorship by the film festival's organizers to "seemingly to avoid disfavor from powerful foreign interests."

=== Premiere at DocEdge Festival ===
Puregold has 60 percent stake on the release of Food Delivery causing uncertainty if the film will be released at all. However the March 12 joint statement promised alternate screenings at a yet to be announced date. The filmmakers reportedly gained full rights over Food Delivery but no Philippine-based cinemas agreed to screen the film. The film creators were working for the film to be released in an international film festival outside the Philippines.

The organizers of the DocEdge Festival in New Zealand sent an invite despite submission of entries already being closed. Food Delivery is among the 33 documentaries selected from 1,500 film entries. The film eventually had its premiere on June 30, 2025, at The Capitol Cinema in Auckland. The film was promoted by DocEdge as a "banned film that must be seen". In Rolling Stone Magazine the director said: "We hope this world premiere marks the beginning of a new chapter, one where the film can finally do what it was meant to do: open hearts, spark honest dialogue, and help us imagine a path toward peace in the West Philippine Sea".

DocEdge refused to heed to a July 4 request of the Chinese consulate in Auckland to cancel future screenings of Food Delivery. The consulate labeled Food Delivery as "rife with disinformation and false propaganda" and alleges the film "peddles groundless accusations against China". The New Zealand Ministry of Foreign Affairs and Trade released a statement that while it does not take side to individual claims in the South China Sea dispute, that it fully supports freedom of expression.

=== Philippine premiere ===
Food Delivery was approved for public release in the Philippines by the Movie and Television Review and Classification Board, which granted the film a parental guidance rating, on July 15, 2025. The film had an earlier approval for early 2025 from the MTRCB with the same rating. The now-cancelled release of Food Delivery in CinePanalo in March 2025 was under this period.

There has only been limited release of Food Delivery in the Philippines, with civic groups organizing block screenings of the film. The film made its premiere in the Philippines with a one-day screening at the Power Plant Mall in Makati on July 27, 2025. This was followed by an August 1 to 8, 2025 screening on the same venue.

In August 2025, the film was announced by the Film Development Council of the Philippines as a contender for the Philippines' official entry to the Best International Feature Film category of the Academy Awards in 2026. However, in September 2025 the FDCP decided to enter Magellan instead.

== Accolades ==
Year	Awards	Category	Recipient	Result	Ref.
2025	Doc Edge Festival	Tides of Change Award	Food Delivery	Won	

== See also ==
- Regional reactions to China's maritime activities in the South China Sea
- Sunday Beauty Queen
