= Indrapura =

Indrapura may refer to:

- the ancient name of Indore, the largest city and the commercial capital of the Indian state of Madhya Pradesh
- Indrapura (Champa), capital city of the Champa Kingdom in the 9th century A.D.
- Indrapura (Khmer), the first capital city of Khmer king Jayavarman II
- the old name of Pahang, a state in Malaysia
- an old name of Mount Kerinci, a volcano on Sumatra
- Sultanate of Siak Sri Indrapura, a Muslim kingdom ruling eastern Sumatra from the 18th to the 20th century
  - Siak Sri Indrapura, a town in Riau province of Indonesia, former capital of subsequent Islamic kingdoms and sultanates
- Indrapura (play), a 2006 play by Marlon Miguel
- Indrapura (bug), a genus of bugs in the subfamily Pentatominae

== See also ==
- Indrapur (disambiguation)
- Indrapuri (disambiguation)
- Indore (disambiguation)
- Indraprastha, ancient Indian city in Delhi
