= Indoor =

Indoor(s) may refer to:

- the interior of a building
- Indoor environment, in building science, traditionally includes the study of indoor thermal environment, indoor acoustic environment, indoor light environment, and indoor air quality
- Built environment, the human-made environment that provides the setting for human activity
- Indoor athletics
- Indoor games and sports

== See also ==
- Indore (disambiguation)
- Inside (disambiguation)
- The Great Indoors (disambiguation)
