= Bidasari =

Bidasari may refer to:

- Bidasari (film), a 1965 Malaysian-Singaporean film
- Bidasari (play), a 1999 Filipino stage play
- Syair Bidasari, a 19th century (or earlier) Malay poem, which the 1965 film and 1999 play are based on

== See also ==
- Bidasar (disambiguation)
