= Sonagiri (disambiguation) =

Sonagiri may refer to these places in India:

- Sonagiri, one of Rajgir Hills in Bihar on which the ancient Indian city of Rajgir was settled
- Sonagiri a place in Gwalior, holy for the Jain community
- Sonagiri (Bhopal), a locality in Bhopal, Madhya Pradesh
- Sonagiri, a village in Ratnagiri district, Maharashtra
- Arunachala also Sonagiri, a holy hill in Tamil Nadu, India
