= Sonagiri (Bhopal) =

- Suburb in Bhopal
- Location of Sonagiri in Madhya Pradesh
- Coordinates: 25°43′12″N 78°22′44″E
- Country: India
- State: Madhya Pradesh
- District: Bhopal
- City: Bhopal

Government
  - Body: Bhopal Municipal Corporation
- Time zone: UTC+5:30 (IST)
- Pincode: 462021
- Telephone: 0755
- ISO 3166 code: IN-MP
- Vehicle registration: MP-04

Sonagiri (Hindi: सोनागिरी) is a suburb in Bhopal, India, in the BHEL township in the city of Bhopal.

== Etymology ==
In Hindi, Sonagiri means a hill of gold.

== Establishments ==
Sonagiri, along with the adjacent suburb, Indrapuri is located by the Raisen Road. Sonagiri is now a bustling commercial area, with numerous stores, hospitals & other establishments. Sonagiri is divided into multiple sectors, each of which have a mix of residential & commercial spaces. Sonagiri also has its own Municipal Corporation office.

Apart from this, Sonagiri is adjacent to multiple residential colonies like Kalpana Nagar, Laxmi Nagar and Mohan Nagar. The area is facing occasional water supply issues.
