= Indore (disambiguation) =

Indore is a major city in Madhya Pradesh, India.

Indore may also refer to:

- topics associated with the city:
  - Indore district, the district
  - Indore division, the larger administrative unit
  - Indore State, the former princely state
  - Indore Residency, a residency of British India
- Indore, West Virginia, a place in the United States

== See also ==
- Indori (disambiguation)
- Indoor (disambiguation)
- Indrapura (disambiguation), former name of the Indian city
- Indrapuri (disambiguation), former name of the Indian city
