= Indrapura (play) =

Play written by Marlon Miguel

- Written by: Marlon Miguel and John Borgy Danao
- Characters: Lilasari; Elindro; Lilagretha; Sulayman; Tarsila
- Original language: Filipino
- Genre: Epic
- Setting: Sultanate of Indrapura

Premiere
- Date premiered: 2006
- Place premiered: (Philippines) Justo Albert Auditorium, PLM Main Campus

Indrapura is the second-installment of an epic trilogy and the tenth major production of Magwayen, the premiere theater group of Pamantasan ng Lungsod ng Maynila in the Philippines. It debuted on stage on December 9, 2006, at the Justo Albert Auditorium at the PLM Main Campus.

== Plot ==
Indrapura chronicles the tragic love story of Lilagretha and Elindro. In the narrative, Sulayman adopts his late brother’s daughter, Lilasari, while concealing her rightful claim to the throne of the Sultanate of Indrapura. On her 20th birthday, Lilagretha—Sulayman’s biological daughter—discovers the truth and begins to feel threatened in her position as Sultana. Her jealousy intensifies when Elindro, her love interest, becomes attracted to Lilasari. From that point, the two sisters become bitter rivals. With the aid of the sorceress Tarsila, Lilagretha attempts to kill Lilasari; however, she fails, and her plot is ultimately exposed. Lilagretha was sentenced to death, however, Lilasari forgave her and secured her freedom.

== Cast ==
- Renato Isidro as Tilasaro
- Teresa Tan as Lilasari
- Paula Montano as Tarsila
- Michael Cayetano as Elindro
- Byron Barinuevo as Sulayman
- Jeselle Diaz as Soraya
- Ampol Velasco as Andravari
- Marvin Avila as Rajavari
- Marvin Hilario as Punong Kawal

== Productions ==
The play was written by Marlon Miguel and directed by John Borgy Danao, the same people behind the full-length musical play, Bidasari. It also brought together the endearing music of Carlo Yanesa, the colorful costumes made by Mary Lyn Buguina and Ronald Decena, the state of the art Production Design by Jay Parilla, the outstanding Artist Coaching of Michael Flororita, and the Marketing Genius of Real Florido.
