= Kalpana Nagar =

- Suburb in Bhopal
- Location of Kalpana Nagar in Bhopal
- Coordinates: 23.2521°N 77.4763°E
- Country: India
- State: Madhya Pradesh
- District: Bhopal
- City: Bhopal
- Time zone: UTC+5:30 (IST)
- Pincode: 462021
- Telephone: 0755
- ISO 3166 code: IN-MP
- Vehicle registration: MP-04

Kalpana Nagar (Hindi: कल्पना नगर) is a residential area in Bhopal, Madhya Pradesh. It is one of the major residential areas around the BHEL Township in Bhopal. It is part of the Ward 64 of the Bhopal Municipal Corporation. It was set up in 1982, as an extension of Sonagiri.

== Geography ==
Kalpana Nagar is located in the eastern part of the city of Bhopal. It is situated close to the Sonagiri area, along the Raisen Road. Other localities adjacent to Kalpana Nagar are Rajat Nagar, Sundar Nagar, Aalam Nagar & Laxmi Nagar

== Establishments ==
Kalpana Nagar is mainly a residential area. Some of the major establishments include:

- Maharishi Vidya Mandir, Kalpana Nagar
- Sahkari Parisar Residential Complex
- Chamatkari Mahadev Temple
- Purushottam Gaur Swimming Pool
- Kalpana Nagar Park
