= The Great Outdoors =

The Great Outdoors may refer to:

- The outdoors as a place of outdoor recreation
- The Great Outdoors (film), a 1988 American comedy film
- The Great Outdoors (Australian TV series), an Australian travel magazine show
- The Great Outdoors (British TV series), a British comedy series
- The Great Outdoors (magazine)
- The Great Outdoors (The Ren & Stimpy Show), an episode in The Ren & Stimpy Show
- "The Great Outdoors", a song from Country Bear Vacation Hoedown
- "The Great Outdoors!", a song by Clutch from the album Pure Rock Fury, 2001

== See also ==
- The Great Indoors (disambiguation)
