= Indori =

Indori may refer to:

- Rahat Indori (1950–2020), Indian Bollywood lyricist and Urdu language poet
- Indori Poha, a type of flattened rice
- Indori fort, in Maharashtra, India
- Indori river, in Rajasthan, India
- Indori Ishq, a 2021 Indian web series
- The demonym for Indore, a major city in Madhya Pradesh, India

== See also ==
- Indore (disambiguation)
