= Bidasar =

Bidasar may refer to:

- Bidasar, Churu, a city and a municipality in Churu district in the state of Rajasthan, India
- Bidasar, Sikar, a village in the Laxmangarh administrative region of Sikar district of Rajasthan, India

== See also ==
- Bidasari (disambiguation)
