= Bidasari (play) =

Play written by Marlon Miguel

- Original language: Filipino
- Written by: Marlon Miguel and John Borgy Danao
- Characters: Bidasari; Jamil; Lilagretha br />Garuda; Zervira
- Genre: Epic

Premiere
- Date: 1999
- Place: Justo Albert Auditorium, PLM

Bidasari is the final-installment of a trilogy of Filipino-language stage plays produced and written for Magwayen, the premier theater group of the University of the City of Manila. It was based on the original epic of the same name or title.

The epic love story originally graced the stage in 1999, and once again brought back in theaters in 2009.

== Plot ==
The story revolves around the life of Bidasari, the most beautiful lady in the kingdom of Indrapura and her love with the generous and attractive prince, Jamil. Torn by war, the wicked sultana, Lilagretha, tries to sort things out in the sultanate by getting rid of the rebels led by Armilo. After hearing the oracle, Lilagretha plots Bidasari's death as the latter poses the greatest threat to her power.

== Cast (2009) ==
- Alyssa Paula Tomas as Bidasari. Alyssa was a 2nd-year Physical Therapy student at the PLM. In the second installment titled Indrapura, she was cast as the young Lilagretha.
- Joseph Andrew Nicolas Molina plays Jamil as the ambassador of the Sultanate of Indrapura and the love interest of Bidasari. Joseph was a third-year Mass Communication student at the PLM. He also made a mark when he played the death-row convict in Magwayen's previous production Eks (X).
- Ana Paula Montano as Lilagretha, the evil ruler of Indrapura. Ana Paula's notable performances in the past include being an evil sorceress in Indrapura, a rich nymphomaniac woman in Hawla and a lesbian filmmaker in Eks (X). Ana Paula was a 3rd-year Mass Communication student at the PLM
- Godfrey Santos as Garuda, the monster of the forest. Godfrey was also part of the Magwayen's dance group.
- Fatimah Abinal as Zervira, a clumsy fairy and protector of Bidasari.

== Directors ==
Bidasari is directed by Gawad CCP Awardee John Borgy Danao and written by Magwayen's resident playwright and founder, Carlos Palanca awardee, Marlon Miguel. They are the same people who created the second part of the trilogy, Indrapura, in 2006. Both of them have also collaborated in Saan Darating Ang Umaga?, an afternoon soap on GMA 7
