= Chinese social media claim on Palawan =

Claim by Chinese state media on Chinese social media regarding Palawan

Screencap of a post on Douyin, Weibo and Xiaohongshu (RedNote) claiming that Palawan was once known as Zheng He Island

In early 2025, posts suggesting that the Philippine' island province of Palawan was once a part of Greater China during the Ming dynasty spread on Chinese social media platforms. They claim without evidence that Palawan was once named "Zheng He island" after the Chinese admiral. The government of the People's Republic of China does not officially claim Palawan. Agencies under the Philippine government have nevertheless denounced the social media claims.

== Background ==
In May 2012, He Jia, an anchor of the state-run China Central Television (CCTV) accidentally said "the Philippines belongs to Chinese sovereignty". She apparently meant to say "Huangyan Islands", the Chinese name for the Scarborough Shoal, where a standoff had taken place between the two countries. The broadcast was eventually taken down, and the statement generated mainly sarcastic responses on Chinese social media with the exception of one supportive netizen, who cited the broad reach of Chinese dynasties' tributary system.

The People's Republic of China (PRC) does not lay claim on Palawan, an island province of the Philippines situated outside the nine-dash line. The 2016 Permanent Court of Arbitration ruling rejected the validity of China's claims where they exceed the United Nations Convention on the Law of the Sea.

== Incident ==
In early 2025, social media posts surfaced that Palawan was allegedly once part of Greater China and was once known as "Zheng He Island". The posts on Weibo and Xiaohongshu claimed that Chinese admiral Zheng He visited Palawan in 1300s and the 1400s implying the island was part of Greater China during the Ming dynasty and should be "given back" to China. Another post claimed that the PRC has "restored" the name of Palawan.

== Response ==
The National Historical Commission of the Philippines (NHCP) issued a statement that Palawan has "always been Filipino" and that there is no historical evidence of it having a permanent Chinese population. It said that as early as 1521, chronicler Antonio Pigafetta noted that "Palawan was populated by communities of similar cultural affinity" of the rest of the Philippine archipelago. It added that maps and treaties confirm that Palawan was part of the Sulu Sultanate and later the Captaincy General of the Philippines. Palawan was affirmed to be part of the Philippines under the 1898 Treaty of Paris and 1900 Treaty of Washington.

Filipino-Chinese historian Xiao Chua says that Zheng He never visited the Philippines and that Chinese maps, official and unofficial, had Hainan as China's southernmost territory. He says that it was only in 1947 that China began to claim waters near Palawan.

National Security Adviser Secretary Eduardo Año, while denouncing the claim as "fabrication", underscored that the social media posts were not by official Chinese government websites or by mainstream media outlets.

The National Maritime Council (NMC) alleged that the social media posts are part of the Chinese government's cognitive warfare. There is consensus in the Philippine military and security agencies that this is part of an information warfare.

Ian Chong, a political scientist at the National University of Singapore posits that "this disputable information may have official acceptance to just rile the other side while the party state can claim plausible deniability". Chong compares the Palawan claim, to similar ideas that Okinawa and Siberia should be Chinese.

== See also ==
- Regional reactions to China's maritime activities in the South China Sea
- Ryukyu independence movement, particularly Chinese government views and influence operations
- Chinese irredentism
- Map of National Shame
- "Philippines, Province of China" banners
