= Indrapuri Old Mosque =

Mosque in Indrapuri, Aceh, Indonesia

Indrapuri Old Mosque Meuseujid Tuha Indra Puri
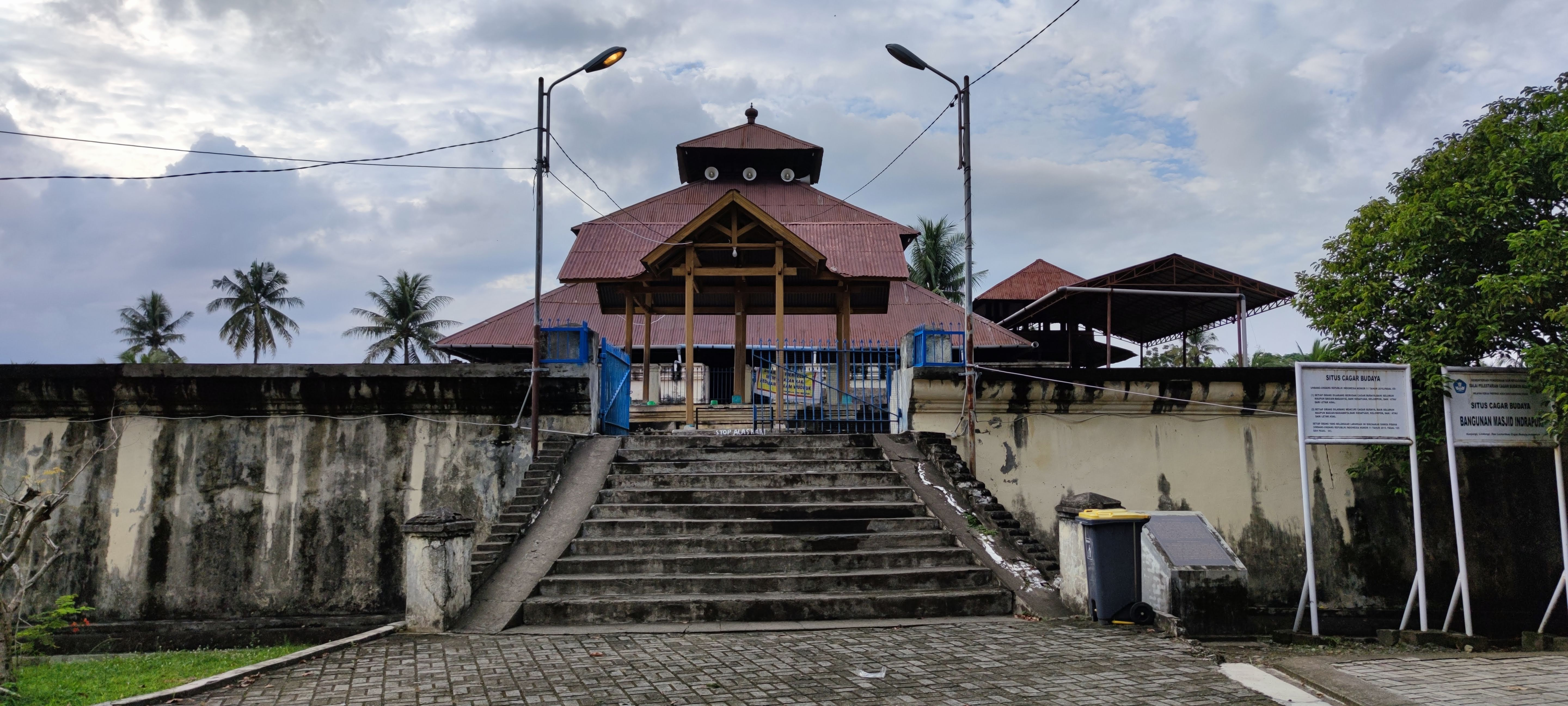

- Location in Aceh, Northern Sumatra, Sumatra and Indonesia Indrapuri Old Mosque (Northern Sumatra) Indrapuri Old Mosque (Sumatra) Indrapuri Old Mosque (Indonesia)

Religion
- Affiliation: Islam
- Branch/tradition: Sunni
- Region: Southeast Asia
- Status: Active

Location
- Location: Indrapuri, Indonesia
- Interactive map of Indrapuri Old Mosque; Meuseujid Tuha Indra Puri
- Coordinates: 5.4154°N 95.4466°E

Architecture
- Type: Mosque
- Style: Acehnese
- Completed: between 1607 - 1636

Indrapuri Old Mosque (Acehnese: Meuseujid Tuha Indra Puri, Indonesian: Masjid Tua Indrapuri) is a mosque in Indrapuri, Aceh, Indonesia. Constructed in the early 17th-century, it is one of the oldest mosques in Aceh Province.

== History ==
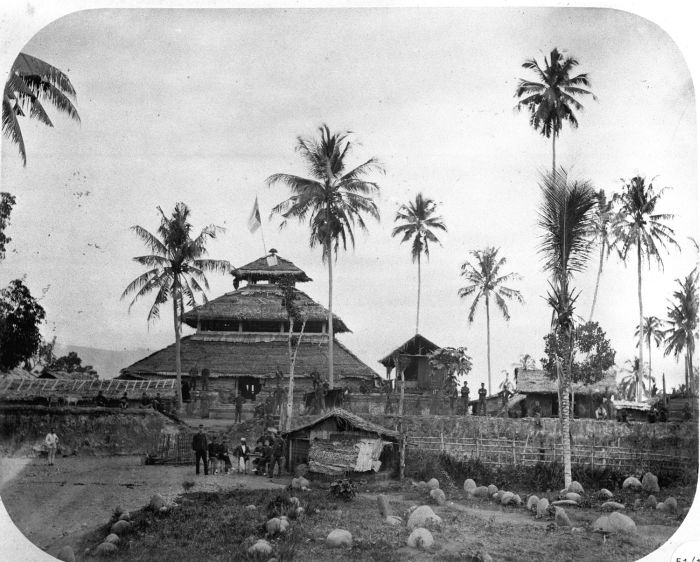
The mosque of Indrapuri in the late 19th-century.

Indrapuri Old Mosque was constructed between 1607 and 1636. The mosque was built on top of the base of a former 12th-century Hindu temple from the Hindu Kingdom of Lamuri of North Sumatra. It is narrated that the kingdom had fought against navy from China, and Lamuri kings emerged victorious eventually with the help of Meurah Johan, who was a prince of the Islamic Linga dynasty and later became a Lamuri king as an adherent of Islam. Since then, the place has been converted into a mosque.

Renovation occurred in 1696 and later in 1879.

== Building ==
Indrapuri Old Mosque was built over a land of 33.875 square metres (364.63 sq ft), the area which corresponds to the base of the older Hindu temple. The mosque is located to the east riverbank of Aceh River, around 100 metres (330 ft) from the edge of the river.

== See also ==
- List of mosques in Indonesia
