= Magwayen =

Visayan goddess of the sea and afterlife

Magwayen ᜋᜄ꠸ᜏᝡᜈ꠸
- Goddess of the sea and afterlife
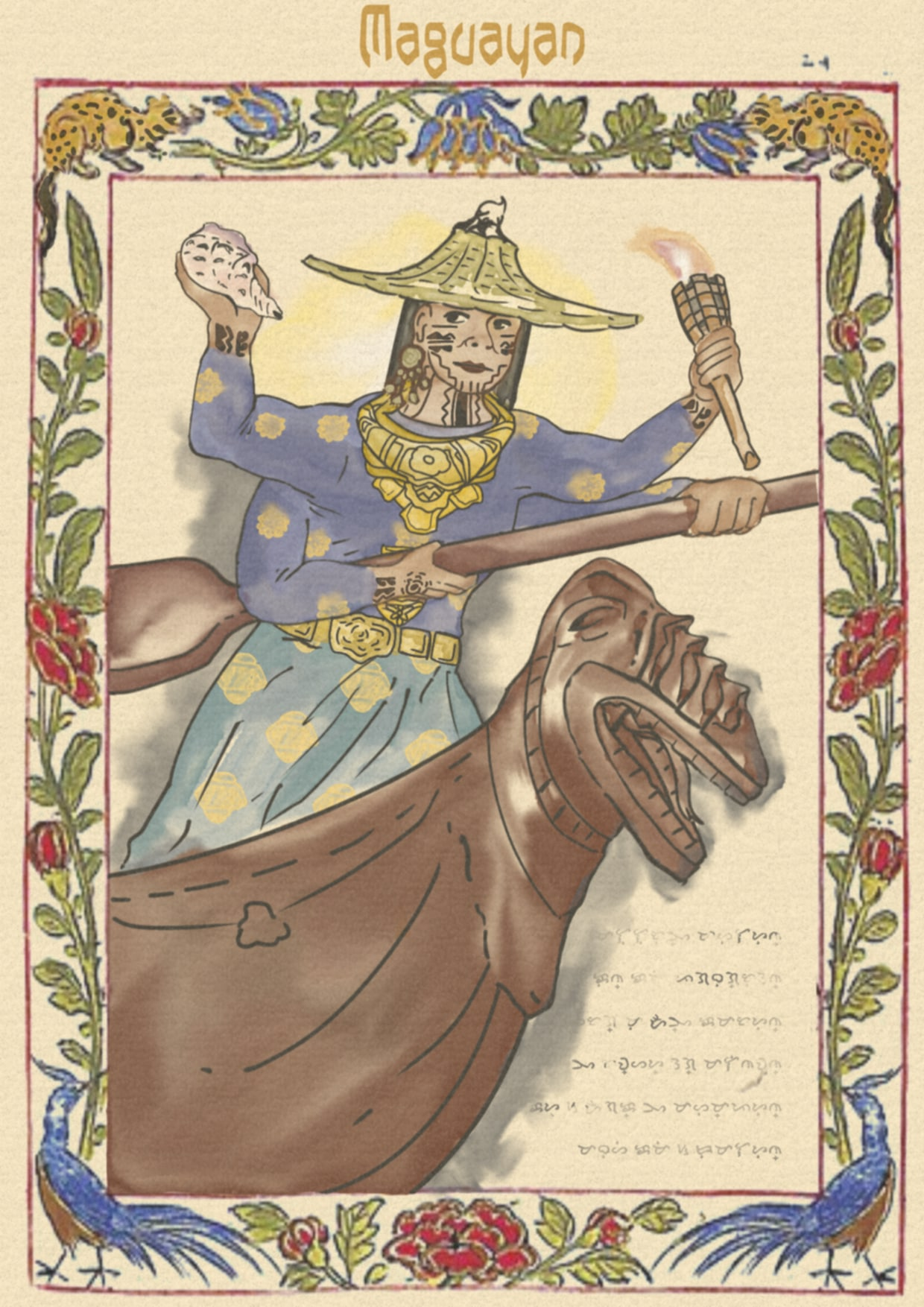
- Artwork of Magwayen inspired by the style of the Boxer Codex.
- Abode: Deep sea
- Gender: Female
- Region: Central Visayas, Western Visayas,

Magwayen (sometimes spelled as Maguayan) also known as Mahulayon is a goddess (locally referred as diwata) of the sea and afterlife in Visayan mythology. According to the ancient Panay people, she is the one who takes the souls of the departed to the afterlife, and she was created by Kan-laon in order to serve as a natural balance to Kaptan, the god of the skies. Kaptan is hotheaded and prone to anger while Magwayen is calm and level-headed. However, Magwayen can also get angry which leads to massive storms and tsunamis. According to the ancient Cebuano people, Kaptan and Magwayen are a couple while the ancient people of Negros viewed them as mortal enemies.

Ancient Filipino fisherfolk prayed to Magwayen for an abundant catch of fish to feed their barangays or communities.

== Folk tradition ==
Magwayen was created by Kan-Laon, the supreme god of the ancient Hiligaynon people, as the goddess of the sea and water and to serve as a balance to the sky god Kaptan. The two have very polar opposite personalities. Kaptan is irritable while Magwayen is the opposite. Although, Magwayen is also prone to anger. She is depicted as a completely naked woman carrying a horn or conch shell, and sometimes holding a baby or with another goddess and surrounded by fish. She is also depicted as a vast ocean that extends across the land to a river deep within the earth. This depiction gave rise to the belief that she is transported by the soul to the depths of the earth where the dead lie. In modern interpretations and practices of ancient beliefs particularly in revivalist movements, she is often depicted as having four hands, holding a horn, oar, and torch while rowing a boat surrounded by hands of souls submerged in the sea. In this regard, he is compared to the ancient Greek gods Poseidon, who rules the sea, and Hades, the god of the dead.

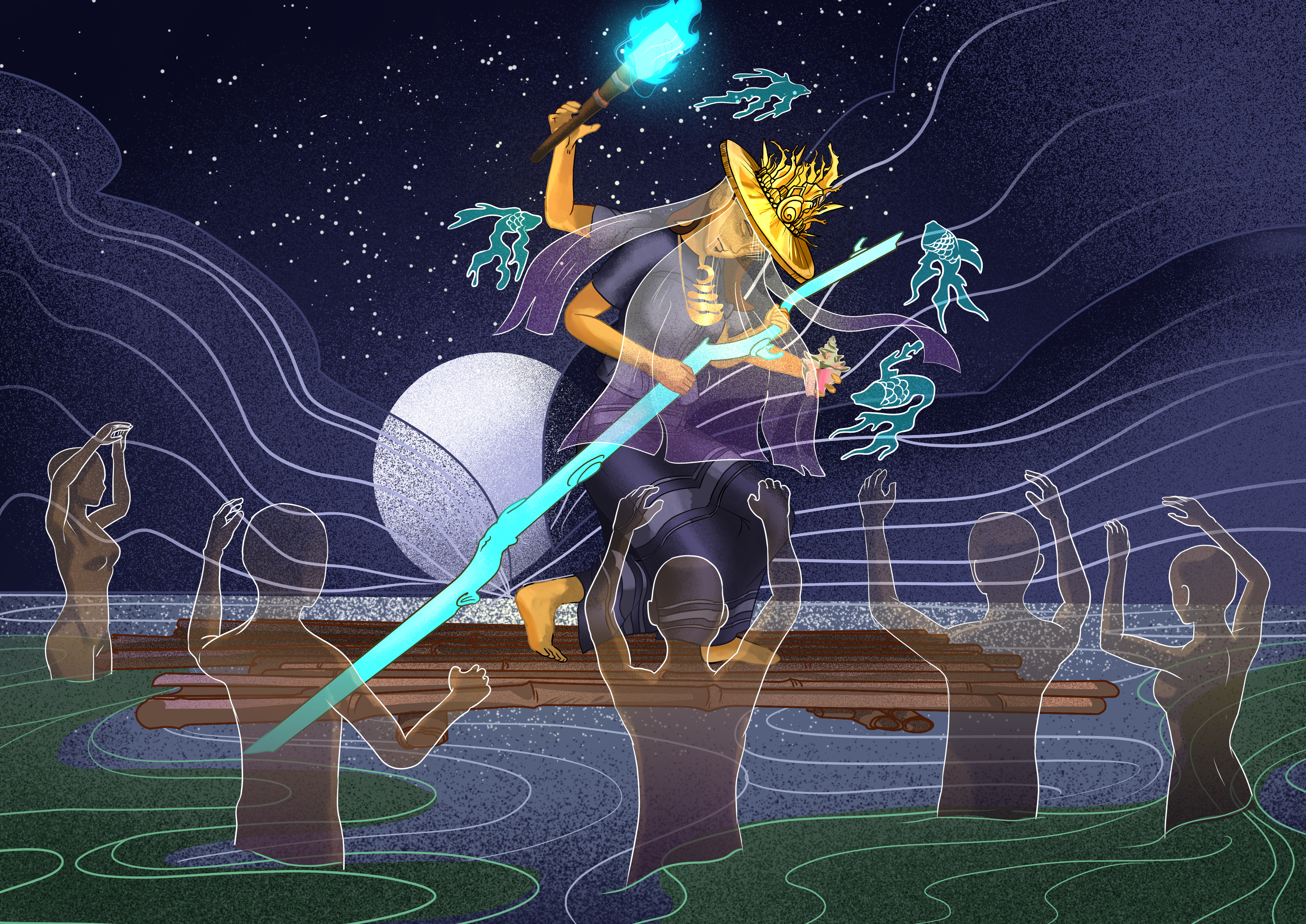
Magwayen navigating through Lalangban, the river that leads to the afterlife.

There are stories of Magwayen and Kaptan getting married and some of them fighting each other. In one story, Magwayen had a daughter named Lidagat, while Kaptan had a son named Lihangin. Magwayen and Kaptan's daughters got married. Lidagat and Lihangin had children named Likalibutan, Liadlaw, Libulan, and Lisuga. Later, Lidagat and Lihangin died and Magwayen and Kaptan took care of their grandchildren. One day, Likalibutan wanted to have more power. So, he called his brothers Liadlaw and Libulan to throw their grandfather Kaptan into the sky. At first, Liadlaw and Libulan did not want to go but Likalibutan was angry and they hesitated to go. The brothers did not succeed and their grandfather killed them with lightning. Lisuga, the remaining grandson, went to heaven to find his brothers. Unfortunately, he was also struck by Kaptan's lightning and died. After this, Kaptan came down from heaven and destroyed the sea, and accused Magwayen of rushing to heaven. Magwayen refused and she calmed Kaptan down. They cried for the loss of their grandson and did not try to revive them. So, Liadlaw became a sun and Libulan the moon. While Lisuga became a star in the sky. All the brothers were given light except for Likalibutan who became the land of earth because of his greed. The land that became Likalibutan will be filled with people. So, Kaptan gave Magwayen a seed to plant in the ground. A bamboo grew from this seed and when separated, the first woman, Sikabay, and the first man, Sikalak, emerged. This story reflects the story of Malakas and Maganda, the folktale of the Tagalogs as the first people in the world who also came from bamboo.

Magwayen standing triumphantly over the treacherous Sinogo.

Magwayen also plays a major part in the folk story The Faithlessness of Sinogo. In this legend, Kaptan gifted her the enchanted budyong (conch shell) that is associated with her. The conch shell had the ability to turn its user into any form they wanted. Sinogo, one of Kaptan's servants grew envious and swiftly stole the shell from Magwayen. Kaptan sent his other servant warriors Guidala and Dalangan to pursue the traitorous Sinogo who used the shell to transform into a giant crocodile to evade them. Eventually Kaptan and Magwayen caught up to him, and cursed Sinogo by striking him with a lightning bolt permanently trapping him in the crocodile's form.

== In popular culture and arts ==
Magwayen has been featured in several paintings by various artists. One particular illustrator, Jap Mikel, created a work titled The Ultramar Leones Troop (or The Children of Sulad), which retells the mythology of Magwayen in a modern context. In his story and illustration, Magwayen brings back to life three children who drowned, transforming them into protectors against invaders – symbolically reflecting real-world events such as the territorial conflict between the Philippines and China in the West Philippine Sea.

Magwayen has been depicted in two teleserye from GMA Network. Aubrey Miles played the role of Magwayen in the 2011 teleserye Amaya. Isabelle Daza was the second actress to portray the goddess in 2013's Indio.
