= Indrapur =

Indrapur may refer to:

- Indrapur, Bheri, city in the Banke District of Nepal
- Indrapur, Koshi, city in the Morang District of Nepal

== See also ==
- Indrapura (disambiguation)
