= Territorial disputes in the South China Sea =

Map of the nine-dash line and EEZs

Brunei, Indonesia, Malaysia, the Philippines, the People's Republic of China (PRC), Taiwan (Republic of China/ROC), and Vietnam have conflicting island and maritime claims in the South China Sea. The disputes involve the islands, reefs, banks, and other features of the region, including the Spratly Islands, Paracel Islands, Scarborough Shoal, and some boundaries in the Gulf of Tonkin. The waters near the Indonesian Natuna Islands, which some regard as geographically part of the South China Sea, are disputed as well.

An estimated US$3.36 trillion worth of global trade passes through the South China Sea annually, which accounts for a third of the global maritime trade. 80 percent of China's energy imports and 40 percent of China's total trade passes through the South China Sea. Claimant states are interested in retaining or acquiring the rights to fishing stocks, the exploration and potential exploitation of crude oil and natural gas in the seabed of various parts of the South China Sea, and the strategic control of important shipping lanes. Maritime security is also an issue, as the ongoing disputes present challenges for shipping.

According to researchers, claims to any of the features were not seriously made until the 19th or the early 20th century. The Paracel Islands, currently occupied by China, are contested by Taiwan and Vietnam. The Spratly Islands are claimed by all three, where Vietnam occupies the greatest number of features and Taiwan occupies the largest, Taiping Island. Brunei, Malaysia, and the Philippines also claim some of the features in the island chain. By the 1970s, the Philippines, Taiwan, and Vietnam had militarily occupied one or more of the Spratly Islands. By 2015, the PRC had established 8 outposts, Malaysia 5, the Philippines 8, Taiwan 1, and Vietnam 48.

For decades, the Philippines and Vietnam were the most active in building artificial islands in the area, but from 2014 to 2016 China's construction activity outpaced them. By 2023, China had reclaimed around five square miles with its artificial islands, at least one of which housed military equipment.

China's actions in the South China Sea have been criticized as part of its "salami slicing"/"cabbage wrapping" strategies. Since 2015, the United States and other states such as France and the United Kingdom have conducted freedom of navigation operations (FONOP) in the region. A 2016 arbitration tribunal, without determining the sovereignty of any of the islands, concluded that China lacks historical titles to the maritime areas within the nine-dash line. The ruling was rejected by both the PRC and ROC.

== Disputes in the South China Sea region ==
Summary of disputes
Area of dispute	Brunei	China	Indonesia	Malaysia	Philippines	Taiwan	Vietnam
The nine-dash line	✔	✔	✔	✔	✔	✔	✔
Vietnamese coast		✔				✔	✔
Sea area north of Borneo	✔	✔		✔	✔	✔	
South China Sea islands		✔		✔	✔	✔	✔
Sea area north of the Natuna Islands		✔	✔			✔	
Sea area west of Palawan and Luzon		✔			✔	✔	
Sabah coast		✔	✔	✔	✔	✔	✔
Luzon Strait		✔			✔	✔	
Taiwan and China		✔				✔	

Location of the major islands in Spratly Islands. The eastern Dangerous Ground area contains many other reefs.
- Legend:
- Republic of China (Taiwan): 1: Taiping 2: Zhongzhou
- China: 3: Yongshu 4: Meiji 5: Zhubi 6: Huayang 7: Nanxun 8: Chiguo 9: Dongmen
- Philippines: 10: Flat Island 11: Lankiam Cay 12: Loaita Cay 13: Loaita Island 14: Nanshan Island 15: Northeast Cay 16: Thitu Island 17: West York Island 18: Commodore Reef 19: Irving Reef 20: Second Thomas Shoal
- Vietnam: 21: Southwest Cay 22: Sand Cay 23: Namyit Island 24: Sin Cowe Island 25: Spratly Island 26: Amboyna Cay 27: Grierson Reef 28: Central London Reef 29: Pearson Reef 30: Barque Canada Reef 31: West London Reef 32: Ladd Reef 33: Discovery Great Reef 34: Pigeon Reef 35: East London Reef 36: Alison Reef 37: Cornwallis South Reef 38: Petley Reef 39: South Reef 40: Collins Reef 41: Lansdowne Reef 42: Bombay Castle 43: Prince of Wales Bank 44: Vanguard Bank 45: Prince Consort Bank 46: Grainger Bank 47: Alexandra Bank 48: Orleana Shoal 49: Kingston Shoal
- Malaysia: 50: Swallow Reef 51: Ardasier Reef 52: Dallas Reef 53: Erica Reef 54: Investigator Shoal 55: Mariveles Reef
- Brunei: 56: Louisa Reef

The disputes involve both maritime boundaries and islands. There are several disputes, each of which involves a different collection of countries:

1. The nine-dash line area claimed by the Republic of China (1912–1949), later the People's Republic of China (PRC), which covers most of the South China Sea and overlaps with the exclusive economic zone claims of Brunei, Indonesia, Malaysia, the Philippines, Taiwan, and Vietnam.
2. Maritime boundary along the Vietnamese coast between the PRC, Taiwan, and Vietnam.
3. Maritime boundary north of Borneo between the PRC, Malaysia, Brunei, Philippines, and Taiwan.
4. Islands, reefs, banks and shoals in the South China Sea, including the Paracel Islands, Pratas Island, James Shoal and the Vereker Banks, Macclesfield Bank, Scarborough Shoal and the Spratly Islands between the PRC, Taiwan, and Vietnam, and parts of the area also contested by Malaysia and the Philippines.
5. Maritime boundary in waters north of the Natuna Islands between the PRC, Indonesia, Taiwan and Vietnam.
6. Maritime boundary off the coast of Palawan and Luzon between the PRC, the Philippines, and Taiwan.
7. Maritime boundary, land territory, and the islands of Sabah, including Ambalat, between Indonesia, Malaysia, and the Philippines.
8. Maritime boundary and islands in the Luzon Strait between the PRC, the Philippines, and Taiwan.
9. Renewed sovereignty claim by the Philippines over Malaysia's state of Sabah and an attempted extension of its continental shelf from Palawan, despite Sabah being internationally recognized as part of Malaysia and governed as a Malaysian state since 1963.

== History ==
In 1734, the Spanish colonial government in the Philippines published the first edition of the Velarde map. In 1792, the Spanish colonial government of the Philippines named Scarborough Shoal Basinloc during a survey. The 1808 Carita General del Archipelago Filipino and the 1875 Carita General del Archipelago Filipino republished depictions from the Velarde map.

According to retired Philippine Supreme Court justice Antonio Carpio, territories in these maps fell under the sovereignty of Spanish Philippines, including Scarborough Shoal (called Panacot in the indigenous language in the maps) and the Spratly Islands (Los Bajos de Paragua in the maps).

China has a different perspective, asserting that maps produced in 1775, 1810 and 1817 include the Spratly and Paracel islands as Chinese territory. Vietnam's first maps extending its territory to the Spratly Islands were published in 1830 under Emperor Minh Mang.

After the Spanish-American War, Spain lost and ceded the territory of the Philippines to the United States through the 1898 Treaty of Paris, and it had maps as annexes. The map shows that the treaty's definition of Philippine territory did not include Scarborough Shoal and the Spratlys. Because parts of Tawi-Tawi remained under Spanish control as these were outside treaty lines. This led to the signing of the Treaty of Washington (1900), which according to the Philippines retroactively ceded Scarborough Shoal, the Spratlys, and the remainder of Tawi-Tawi to the United States as part of Philippine territory. But some analysts believe that the 1900 Treaty of Washington concerned only the islands of Sibutu and Cagayan de Sulu, and not Scarborough Shoal, the Spratlys. As of 2023, the United States takes no position on sovereignty over the geographic features of the South China Sea.

In 1909, the Chinese reacted to Japanese interest in exploiting guano in the Paracel Islands by mapping them, stationing Chinese navy personnel, and hoisting a flag to reassert Chinese sovereignty.

In 1930, the United States and the United Kingdom signed a treaty, where the United Kingdom recognized the territory of Philippines as it related to the boundaries of the Philippines and North Borneo which included Scarborough Shoal and islands in the Spratlys. This treaty is internationally binding, however in 1961 the United States sent a diplomatic note to the Philippines pointing out that neither country that signed agreed with the subsequent Philippines interpretation of this treaty as applying to a claim for the waters within the Treaty Limits as part of Philippine territory. Carpio claims that this effectively binds the United Kingdom's successor countries, such as Malaysia and Brunei, to recognize Philippine ownership of the islands.

In 1932, France occupied the Paracels and laid claims on the territory. China protested and filed a Note Verbale stating the Paracels were the "southernmost part of Chinese territory". According to Carpio, this can be interpreted as negating China's later claim towards the Spratlys. He also said that when France formally claimed six features in the Spratly Islands in July 1933, it did so for itself, not as a representative of French Indochina and its successors such as Vietnam, although another source disagrees with that assertion. Accounts also differ as to whether China (and Japan) protested the 1933 French claim or not.

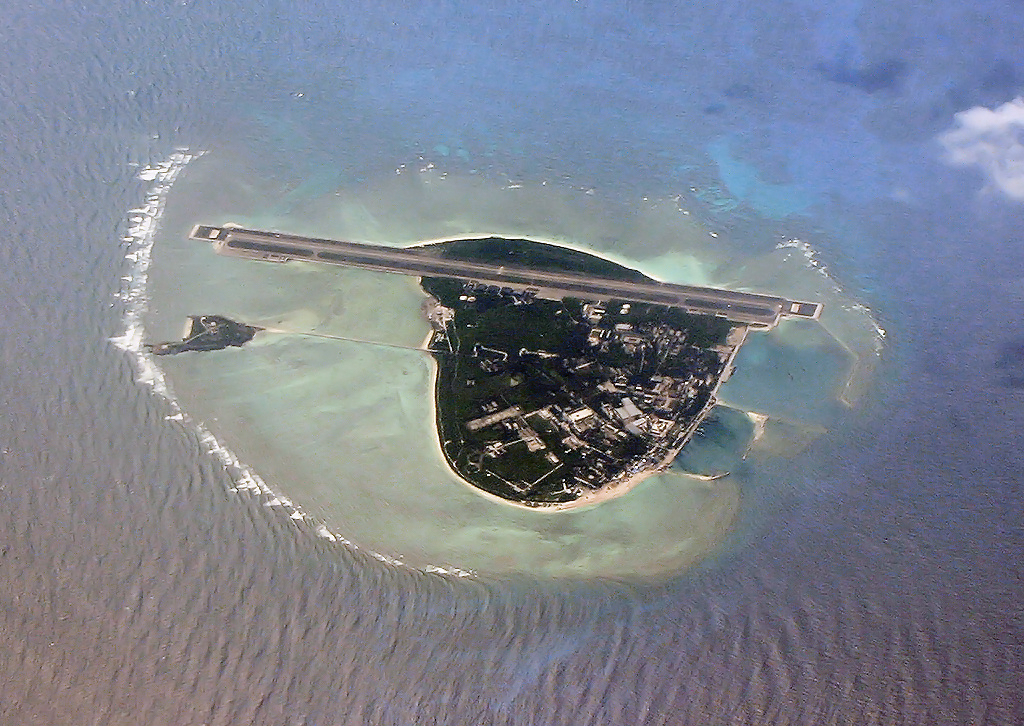
South-east facing aerial view of PRC-settled Woody Island. The island is also claimed by Taiwan and Vietnam.

By May 1939, the Japanese occupied much of Southeast Asia, including the Paracel and Spratly Islands. During World War II, the Empire of Japan used the islands in the South China Sea for various military purposes and asserted that the islands were not claimed by anyone when the Imperial Japanese Navy took control of them. Manila claims that their actual sovereignty was under the American territory of the Philippines at that time.

During the Second Sino-Japanese War, China Handbook (1937–1943) stated that its southernmost territory is Triton Island of the Paracels. In the 1944 revised edition, the handbook said China, Indochina, and the Philippines all claimed the Spratlys. According to retired Philippine judge Antonio Carpio, China held this position when it published another edition in 1947 and China's claim is "defective" under international law.

In 1947 the Republic of China (ROC) published an "eleven-dash line" in the South China Sea. Chinese names for the island groups, which were regarded as under Chinese administrative jurisdiction, were announced in December 1947 by the ROC Ministry of the Interior. In 1949, the People's Republic of China (PRC), which defeated the ROC in the Chinese Civil War, announced that it had inherited this claim. The PRC later revised the claim by removing two of its dashes in the Gulf of Tonkin amidst warming ties with Ho Chi Minh's North Vietnam. The ROC government on Taiwan has continued to use eleven dashes.

In August 1951, Zhou Enlai, then the PRC's foreign minister, claimed that the Paracel and Spratly Islands "have always been Chinese territory". During the 1951 San Francisco peace conference, the Soviet Union made a motion to grant the Paracels and the Spratlys to China, but it was defeated by vote. Japan relinquished control of the islands in the South China Sea with the signing of the Treaty of San Francisco on 9 September 1951 but did not specify the new status of the islands. Prime Minister Trần Văn Hữu as Vietnamese representative stated that “in order to annul the seeds of possible disputes, we claim our sovereignty over Hoang Sa and Truong Sa archipelagos”. Overall, the communist bloc favored PRC claims. Australia was opposed to the bloc's influence. The United States was torn between French "colonialist" claims and Chinese (ROC) claims which might end up helping the PRC. Britain favored ambiguity due to its previous claims on some of the islands.

The Geneva Accords of 1954, which ended the First Indochina War, gave the State of Vietnam control of the Vietnamese territories south of the 17th parallel. In 1955, France clarified through international notes that the Spratlys belonged to "the French Union" because they were not attached to Vietnam when Cochinchina was ceded and North Vietnam did not protest Chinese claims. The South Vietnamese government, however, claimed the Paracels and the Spratly.

North Vietnam received aid from China during the Vietnam War and recognised Chinese claims on the Paracels and Spratlys. After winning the war, North Vietnam retracted its recognition. During June 1977 discussions with PRC president Li Xiannan amid rising tensions between the two countries, prime minister Pham stated that the 1958 recognition of China's sovereignty over the Paracels was only made under the pressure of America's war against North Vietnam.

In the 1970s, the discovery of the potential for petroleum resources in the South China Sea prompted an increase in occupation activity by claimants. From 1971 to 1973, the Philippines began occupying five features and South Vietnam began occupying six. Concerned that its claims would be weakened by the activity of other claimants, China increased its physical presence in the area. It conducted surveys around the Paracels and the People's Liberation Army Navy built a harbor and wharf on Wood Island (in the Paracels) in 1971.

In 1974, when a North Vietnamese victory in the Vietnam War began to seem probable, the PRC used military force in the Paracel Islands and took Yagong Island and the Crescent group of reefs from South Vietnam. The "Operation Tran Hung Dao 48" was a campaign conducted by the South Vietnamese Navy in February 1974 to station troops on unoccupied islands to assert Vietnam's sovereignty over the Spratly archipelago after the Battle of the Paracel Islands. The government of the PRC wanted to prevent the Paracel islands from falling under the control of North Vietnam, which at the time was an ally of the Soviet Union. After not resisting during the initial Vietnamese attack, the PRC launched what they regarded as a "counterattack in self-defense". The United States, in the middle of détente with the PRC, gave a non-involvement promise to the PRC, which enabled the People's Liberation Army Navy to take control of the South Vietnamese islands.

In the later half of 1970s, the Philippines and Malaysia began referring to the Spratly Islands as being included in their own territory. On 11 June 1978, the Philippines through Presidential Decree No. 1596, declared the north-western part of the Spratly Islands (referred to therein as the Kalayaan Island Group) as Philippine territory.

In 1988, the PRC and Vietnam fought each other near the Johnson Reef. The PRC had obtained a permit from the Intergovernmental Oceanographic Commission to build five observation posts for the conduction of ocean surveys, and one of the permitted observation posts was allowed to be located in the Spratly islands region. The PRC chose to build its observation post on the Fiery Cross Reef, which was isolated from the other islands in the region and was not occupied by any state at the time. When it started to build the observation post in the terra nullius Fiery Cross Reef, Vietnam sent its navy to the area to monitor the situation. The two states clashed near the Johnson Reef, and after the clash, China occupied the Johnson Reef. In 1990, 1994, and 1997, the People's Republic of China released An Atlas of Ancient Maps of China in three volumes. According to Philippine judge Antonio Carpio, no ancient map showed Chinese sovereignty over any territory south of Hainan.

In 1994, the PRC occupied Mischief Reef, located some 250 miles from the Philippine coast. Occupation was made in the middle of an energy resources race in the Spratlys, where China lacked a presence, while the other countries were starting their oil exploration businesses. Mischief Reef marked the first time the PRC had a military confrontation with the Philippines, an ally of the United States.

The occupation and/or control of most parts of the Spratly and Paracel islands did not change significantly from the 90s to the 2000s. To this day, the PRC controls all of the islands in the Paracels. In the Spratlys, Vietnam controls the most islands with 29 in total, while the Philippines has control of eight islands, Malaysia with 5, the PRC with 5, and the ROC with 1.

However, in 2011, tensions started to increase again in the territory. In February, the Chinese frigate Donguan fired three shots at Philippine fishing boats near Jackson atoll. In May, the Vietnamese Binh Minh 02 oil and gas survey ship clashed with three Chinese maritime patrol vessels some 600 km south of China's Hainan island.

Beginning in 2012, the islands became more increasingly militarized. The ROC (Taiwan) started the construction of an antenna tower and runway on the Taiping island in February, allowing it to accommodate various military aircraft. On Sand Cay and West Reef, Vietnam began a series of upgrades and land reclamation projects. It formally staked its claims to the Paracels and the Spratlys via the passage of the June 2012 "Vietnamese Law of the Sea".

Tensions at Scarborough Shoal began on April 8, 2012, after the attempted apprehension by the Philippine Navy of eight mainland Chinese fishing vessels near the shoal, beginning the Scarborough Shoal standoff between the Philippine Navy and the Chinese Coast Guard. The experience of the dispute later prompted the Philippines to initiate the South China Sea arbitration against the PRC. The PRC December 2014 white paper ("On the Matter of Jurisdiction in the South China Sea Arbitration Initiated by the Republic of the Philippines") focused on the contention that the dispute was not subject to arbitration because it was ultimately a matter of sovereignty, not exploitation rights. The PRC also cited its signing of the 2006 UNCLOS arbitration exclusion for sovereignty and boundary limitations disputes. Because the PRC did not participate in the arbitration, the arbitrators based their view of the PRC position on its 2014 white paper and letters sent to the tribunal from the PRC's ambassador to the Netherlands.In 2016, the Philippines won the case, and the international court effectively invalidated the dash line.

Beginning in 2015, China's People's Liberation Army Air Force began patrolling the South China Sea, including the disputed Paracel and Spratly Islands. In China's view, these disputed areas are within its Air defense identification zone (ADIZ). The United States Air Force does not accept this view, and flies its military planes through the area without informing China.

China has been accused of using grey-zone tactics and its maritime militia in incidents involving the BRP Sierra Madre, the Hai Yang Shi You 981 in 2014, in the Natuna Islands in 2016 and the Whitsun Reef in 2021.

Some recent historiographical narratives in Vietnam have reassessed South Vietnam as a legitimate state, partly to support claims of sovereignty over the Paracel and Spratly Islands, on the grounds that the Republic of Vietnam exercised legal authority over these maritime territories.

In June 2020, Indonesia cited the South China Sea Arbitration ruling in its note verbale against China, amid China's encroachment activities in the waters around the Natuna islands. In October, Teodoro Locsin Jr., the Filipino Secretary of Foreign Affairs, said that the Philippines was building a maritime fleet that could swarm areas in the South China Sea. He said the fleet build up was because of China which was also doing the same thing. He also said if one of the vessels got hit, the Filipino defense treaty with the United States would also be activated.

In February 2023, the Philippines launched its Transparency Initiative to raise awareness internationally of grey-zone tactics used by China in the West Philippine Sea. In January 2024, Philippine foreign affairs undersecretary Tess Lazaro and Chinese Assistant Minister of Foreign Affairs Nong Rong met to defuse tensions in the dispute, with both diplomats agreeing to improve communication between the officials and coast guards of both countries in the maritime area. In June 2024, Philippine Armed Forces commander Alfonso Torres Jr. said the ramming of one China Coast Guard (CCG) vessel into a Philippine navy boat led to the cutting of a Philippine crew member's finger. It was part of an incident where CCG crew members reportedly boarded their rubber boats and confiscated 7 of their rifles; Philippine general Romeo Brawner Jr. contended that the CCG personnel behaved like "pirates".

In August 2025, GMA Network reported that two Chinese warships pursued a Philippine boat, hitting the boat's flagpole in the process. The two Chinese warships then accidentally hit each other, resulting to the deaths of two Chinese crew members. The Philippine boat sent a radio signal to the Chinese warships, asking if they need medical aid. The Chinese side did not respond.

== Conflicts over fishing ==
Prior to the territorial disputes, fishermen from involved countries tended to enter each other's controlled islands and Exclusive Economic Zones (EEZ) leading to conflicts with the authorities that controlled the areas as they were unaware of the exact borders. As well, due to depletion of the fishing resources in their maritime areas, they were forced to fish in the neighbouring countries' areas.

In May 2013 a Taiwanese fisherman on Guang Da Xing No. 28 operating 43 nautical miles east of Balintang Island on the eastern side of the Balintang Channel was killed by machine gun fire from a Philippine Coast Guard vessel. In September 2019, seven members of the coast guard and a police man involved were convicted and sentenced to imprisonment and civil damages.

Indonesian President Joko Widodo instituted a policy in 2015 that, if any foreign fishermen were caught illegally fishing in Indonesian waters, their vessels would be destroyed. He wanted to make maritime resources, especially fisheries, a key component of his administration's economic policy. Since the policy's initiation, fishing vessels drawing from many neighbouring countries were destroyed by Indonesian authorities. On 21 May 2015, around 41 fishing vessels from China, Vietnam, Thailand and the Philippines were destroyed. On 19 March 2016, the China Coast Guard prevented the detention of Chinese fishermen by Indonesian authorities after Chinese fishermen were caught fishing near the waters around Natuna, leading to a protest by Indonesian authorities; the Chinese ambassador was subsequently summoned, as China had considered the areas to be "Chinese traditional fishing grounds". Further Indonesian campaigns against foreign fishermen resulted in the destruction of 23 fishing boats from Malaysia and Vietnam on 5 April 2016.

Out of the 556 ships Indonesia had destroyed from October 2014 to 2019 for violating rules, 312 of them were from Vietnam, 91 were from the Philippines, 87 were from Malaysia, 26 were local, and 3 were from China. According to a 2023 Tempo report, Thai vessels also often illegally fished in Indonesian waters. The areas in the South China Sea had also become known for Indonesian pirates, with frequent attacks on Malaysian, Singaporean and Vietnamese vessels as well as leading to hijacking such as the MT Orkim Harmony and MT Zafirah hijacking incidents. The continuing war against foreign fishermen by Indonesia led to protests by Vietnam in late 2016, when a Vietnamese fisherman was killed after being shot by Indonesian authorities. Attacks have also come from Filipino and Moro pirates arriving from the Sulu Sea; a Vietnamese fisherman was killed by Filipino pirates in late 2015.

In 2017, two Vietnamese fishermen died from gunshot wounds from a pursuing Philippine Navy patrol boat about 40 miles off the city of Bolinao, Pangasinan. A police report said that the boats had collided after the navy had fired warning shots; the Philippine government said that it had promised Vietnam a “fair and thorough” investigation.

On 8 May 2019, Vietnam's ambassador to Malaysia was summoned to the Malaysian Ministry of Foreign Affairs to explain on the high number of encroachments by Vietnamese vessels into the country's waters. Three months later, Mahathir Mohamad who was Prime Minister at the time also raised the issue with his Vietnamese counterpart. According to the Malaysia Maritime Enforcement Agency, most illegal fishing incidents in Malaysian waters have come from Vietnamese vessels, followed by Thai ones.

As part of a group of cooperation agreements announced in December 2023, the China and Vietnam announced joint patrols in the Gulf of Tonkin and a hotline to handle South China Sea fishing incidents.

On 13 April 2026, the Philippine Navy spokesman said that their members had seized 10 bottles of cyanide in the previous year from China-affiliated sampan boats near Second Thomas Shoal in the Spratly Islands. The Philippine National Security Council alleged that China's intent was to "kill local fish populations, depriving Navy personnel of a vital food source". China denied the claim and accused Manila of staging the incident.

== Oil and gas development ==
The area is said to be rich in oil and natural gas deposits; however, the estimates are highly varied. Some sources claim that the proven reserves of oil in the South China Sea may only be 7.5 billion barrels, or about 1.1 billion barrels. According to the US Energy Information Administration (EIA)'s profile of the South China Sea region, a US Geological Survey estimate puts the region's discovered and undiscovered oil reserves at 11 billion barrels, as opposed to a PRC figure of 125 billion barrels. The same EIA report also points to the wide variety of natural gas resource estimations, ranging from 190 trillion cubic feet to 500 trillion cubic feet, likely located in the contested Reed Bank".

Competing claims in the oil and gas-rich South China Sea have stifled the development and exploitation of these resources. To break from this, the Philippines and China agreed to a Memorandum of Understanding (MoU) on Cooperation on Oil and Gas Development in November 2018, where joint-use of, and not ownership over assets underlies the agreement. In the past, Chinese naval patrols deterred Filipino PXP Energy from exploring gas deposits in disputed waters, like the Reed Bank, such that this type of agreement may allow for the claimant states to jointly develop the natural gas in the offshore area. The mechanism of joint agreements is not new, with Malaysia and Vietnam having forged a similar mechanism in 1992, while Malaysia and Thailand reached understandings in 1979 and 1990 over the development of gas-rich disputed waters.

=== Philippines ===
The Philippines began exploring the areas west of Palawan for oil in 1970. Exploration in the area began in Reed Bank/Tablemount. In 1976, gas was discovered following the drilling of a well. However, the PRC's complaints halted the exploration. On 27 March 1984, the first Philippine oil company discovered an oil field off Palawan, which is an island province bordering the South China Sea and the Sulu Sea. These oil fields supply 15% of annual oil consumption in the Philippines.

=== Vietnam ===
Vietnam and Japan reached an agreement early in 1978 on the development of oil in the South China Sea. In 1986, the "White Tiger" oil field in the South China Sea came into operation, producing over 2,000 tons of crude oil per year, followed by "The Bear" and "Dragon" oil fields. The country is a net importer of oil products. In 2009 petroleum accounted for 14 percent of Vietnamese government income, down from 24 percent in 2004. By 2012 Vietnam had concluded some 60 oil and gas exploration and production contracts with various foreign companies.

In September 2011, shortly after the PRC and Vietnam signed an agreement seeking to contain a dispute over the South China Sea, India's state-run Oil and Natural Gas Corporation (ONGC) said that its overseas arm had signed a three-year agreement with PetroVietnam for developing long-term co-operation in the oil sector, drawing objections from the PRC foreign ministry.

In 2017, following reported Chinese pressure, the Vietnamese government ordered Spain's Repsol to stop drilling in the disputed area. A joint-venture of Japanese Inpex and Petrovietnam planned to start drilling in the disputed area in 2021.

=== China ===
China's first independently designed and constructed oil drilling platform in the South China Sea is the Ocean Oil 981 (海洋石油981). The major shareholders are JPMorgan Chase (19%), Commonwealth Bank (14%), T Rowe Price (6%), and BlackRock (5%). It began operation on 9 May 2012 in the South China Sea, 320 kilometres (200 mi) southeast of Hong Kong, at a depth of 1,500 m and employing 160 people. On 2 May 2014 the platform was moved near to the Paracel Islands, a move Vietnam stated violated their territorial claims. Chinese officials said it was legal, stating the area lies in waters surrounding the Paracel Islands which China occupies and militarily controls.

== Agreements and summits ==
=== 2011 ===
On 20 July 2011, the PRC, Brunei, Malaysia, the Philippines, Taiwan and Vietnam agreed a set of preliminary guidelines on the implementation of the DOC (Declaration of Conduct of Parties in the South China Sea) which would help resolve disputes. This set of guidelines is based on an earlier agreement, also called DOC, from 2002, between China and the ASEAN Member States.

The agreement was described by the PRC's assistant foreign minister, Liu Zhenmin, as "an important milestone document for cooperation among China and ASEAN countries". Some of the early drafts acknowledged aspects such as "marine environmental protection, scientific research, safety of navigation and communication, search and rescue and combating transnational crime", although the issue of oil and natural gas drilling remains unresolved. "Following the spirit of the Declaration on the Conduct of Parties in the South China Sea (DOC), China and ASEAN countries actively advanced the consultations on the Code of Conduct (COC) in the South China Sea," with the forecast that the COC will be completed by 2021.

=== 2016 ===
The Shangri-La Dialogue serves as the "Track One" exchange forum on security issues surrounding the Asia-Pacific region. The South China Sea territorial disputes has dominated proceedings at the conference in recent years. The Council for Security Cooperation in the Asia Pacific is the "Track Two" forum for dialogue on security issues.

In February 2016, U.S. President Barack Obama initiated the US-ASEAN Summit at Sunnylands in Rancho Mirage, California for closer engagement with the Association of Southeast Asian Nations. Territorial disputes in the South China Sea were a major topic, but its joint statement, the "Sunnylands Declaration", did not name the South China Sea, instead calling for "respect of each nation's sovereignty and for international law". Analysts believe it indicates divisions within the group on how to respond to China's maritime strategy.

== Chinese policies ==
According to retired American diplomat Chas W. Freeman Jr. in 2015, China under Chinese leader Deng Xiaoping had for decades preferred a policy of restraint even as claimant activities from other countries in the South China Sea intensified, resisting calls from the more nationalistic elements of Chinese society.

In spring 2010, PRC officials reportedly communicated to US officials that the South China Sea was "an area of 'core interest' that is as non-negotiable" and on par with Taiwan and Tibet on the national agenda. However, Beijing appeared to have backed away from that assertion in 2011.

In October 2011, the Chinese Communist Party-owned Global Times tabloid editorialised on the South China Sea territorial disputes under the banner "Don't take peaceful approach for granted". The article referenced incidents earlier that year involving the Philippines and South Korea detaining PRC fishing boats in the region. "If these countries don't want to change their ways with China, they will need to prepare for the sounds of cannons. We need to be ready for that, as it may be the only way for the disputes in the sea to be resolved." Responding to questions about whether this reflected official policy, a Chinese Foreign Ministry spokeswoman stated the country's commitment "to resolving the maritime dispute through peaceful means."

From 2013 to the beginning of 2018, China carried out land reclamation in the South China Sea. The construction of the islands has been completed. The three island airports of Meiji Reef, Zhubi Reef, and Yongshu Reef have been completed.

In July 2014, Professor Alan Dupont of the University of New South Wales was reported as saying that the Chinese government appeared to be directing its fishing fleet into disputed waters as a matter of policy. China has been accused of using its Maritime Militia and grey-zone tactics in conflicts with other countries. By deploying civilian instead of naval vessels, the PRC benefits from legal and diplomatic ambiguities and avoids military confrontations.

In August 2019, General Secretary of the Chinese Communist Party Xi Jinping told Philippine President Rodrigo Duterte that China would not recognise or abide by the arbitration decision. China rejects the arbitration proceedings as illegitimate because China excluded itself from compulsory arbitration in its ratification of the 2006 United Nations Convention on the Laws of the Seas (UNCLOS). This stance by Beijing is in line with the July 2019 publishing of a Chinese White Paper, "China's National Defense in the New Era," which details China's armed strength and repeatedly mentions deployment in the South China Sea.

In July 2025, the Chinese consulate in Auckland requested that the Doc Edge Festival in New Zealand cancel the screening of Food Delivery: Fresh From the West Philippine Seas, alleging that "the film is rife with disinformation and false propaganda, to serve as [a] political tool for the Philippines." The film documents the experiences of Philippine fishermen and the Philippine Coast Guard, highlighting tensions with the China Coast Guard. The formal request has been described as an attempt to censor the film.

In July 2026, China finished the first stage of construction at Antelope Reef, after work on dredging and reclaiming land began in December 2025. The project turned the reef into an artificial island nearly 6 km long, with a deep-water harbour and other facilities.

== International law ==
The doctrine of intertemporal law was established after the Island of Palmas Case ruling. Under the doctrine, treaty rights are assessed under the laws in force at the time the treaty is made, not at the time a dispute takes place.

In the Eastern Greenland Case between Norway and Denmark, the critical date doctrine was established in 1933. It was ruled by the Permanent Court of International Justice (PCIJ) that the Norwegian proclamation on July 10, 1931, annexing Eastern Greenland was the "critical date" in that specific case.

Under the principle of Uti possidetis juris, the boundaries of former colonies must be respected by all states. It was established after the 1986 Frontier Dispute case between Burkina Faso and Mali. The ICJ ruled that uti possidetis juris is a "general principle, which is logically connected with the phenomenon of the obtaining of independence, wherever it occurs. Its obvious purpose is to prevent the independence and stability of new States being endangered by fratricidal struggles provoked by the challenging of frontiers following the withdrawal of the administering power…Its purpose, at the time of the achievement of independence by the former Spanish colonies of America, was to scotch any designs which non-American colonizing powers might have on regions which had been assigned by the former metropolitan State to one division or another, but which were still uninhabited or unexplored."

Maps cannot establish title to territory unless if it is attached to a treaty. Moreover, maps unilaterally produced by a state, even if not attached to a treaty, can bind the producing state if it is "adverse to its interest". This was established in the 2002 Delimitation of the Border between the State of Eritrea and Ethiopia case, and was affirmed further in the Pedra Blanca arbitration between Malaysia and Singapore in 2008, when the ICJ ruled: "The map still stands as a statement of geographical fact, especially when the State adversely affected has itself produced and disseminated it, even against its own interest."

=== South China Sea Arbitration ===
In 2013, the Philippines initiated an arbitration against China on South China Sea issues, with its initial petition disputing the nine-dash line's validity, China's environmental impact, and the legality of China's contact with Filipino vessels in the area. In 2015, the Philippines added contentions based on China's land reclamation projects.

Both China and Taiwan stated that they did not recognize the tribunal and insisted that the matter should be resolved through bilateral negotiations with other claimants. As part of its grounds for nonparticipation and nonacceptance, China cited the fact that China is a signatory to the 2006 UNCLOS exclusion clause which removes sovereignty and boundary delimitations issues from arbitration procedures.

The merits hearing proceeded without China's presence and the arbitration result favored the Philippines on most of its contentions.

In September 2020, Philippine president Rodrigo Duterte again rejected China's claims to the disputed waters and said, "The award is now part of international law, beyond compromise and beyond the reach of passing governments to dilute, diminish, or abandon."

In response to the ruling, political scientist Graham Allison stated, "None of the five permanent members of the UN Security Council have ever accepted any international court's ruling when (in their view) it infringed their sovereignty or national security interests. Thus, when China rejects the Court's decision in this case, it will be doing just what the other great powers have repeatedly done for decades."

On 17 September 2020, France, Germany, and the United Kingdom issued a joint note verbale recognizing the PCA ruling and challenging China's claims.

A legal scholar at De La Salle University observed that discarding the historical claims of the PRC, ROC, and Vietnam is unrealistic. Application of the United Nations Convention on the Law of the Sea and proposed solutions must account for such concerns.

On 12 July 2026, a joint statement was issued by Japan, the Philippines, the U.S., Britain, Australia, Canada, New Zealand, Estonia, Germany, Italy, Latvia, Lithuania, Slovenia and Romania to mark the 10th anniversary of the 2016 South China Sea ruling. The statement said that the ruling was final and should be respected, rejecting China's claims over most of the South China Sea. China dismissed the ruling, stood by its claims, and said countries from outside the region were only making tensions worse.

On 12 July 2026, Taiwan's Ministry of Foreign Affairs restated the Republic of China's "Four Principles" on the South China Sea dispute. It said disputes should be resolved peacefully under international law, stressed the importance of freedom of navigation, and warned against actions that could raise tensions in the region. The statement came on the 10th anniversary of the 2016 international ruling rejecting China's claims in the South China Sea.

=== Analysis and commentary ===
According to Mohan Malik, a professor at the Asia-Pacific Center for Security Studies of the United States Department of Defense, the vast majority of international legal experts have concluded that China's claim to historical title, meaning full sovereign authority, is invalid. U.S. Naval War College professor Peter A. Dutton writes that the Chinese government sees itself as fundamentally above the law and beyond accountability to others, especially smaller states.

According to Johns Hopkins University professor and Carnegie Endowment for International Peace analyst Isaac B. Kardon, Chinese maritime rules mostly mirror the international law except for certain crucial areas reflecting its political interests.

According to Bill Hayton, an analyst at Chatham House, no claimant undertook any physical act of sovereignty on any of the disputed islands before the 19th century. According to historian Stein Tønnesson, no country laid any serious claim to any of the features until the early 20th century.

Broadly speaking China, Taiwan, and Vietnam base their claims on history, such as being the first to name, discover, use, administer, or occupy some of the islands, even if not continuously. It has been argued that UNCLOS supersedes all historical rights, but this is difficult for these governments to embrace. The Philippines argues that before 1956 the islands were terra nullius not owned by anyone and claims the Kalayaan group based on its exclusive economic zone (EEZ), although EEZs apply only to the high seas, not territories that might belong to another state. When signing up for UNCLOS, most of these claimants declared that their disputes are not subject to the convention.

== Non-claimant views ==
=== Australia ===
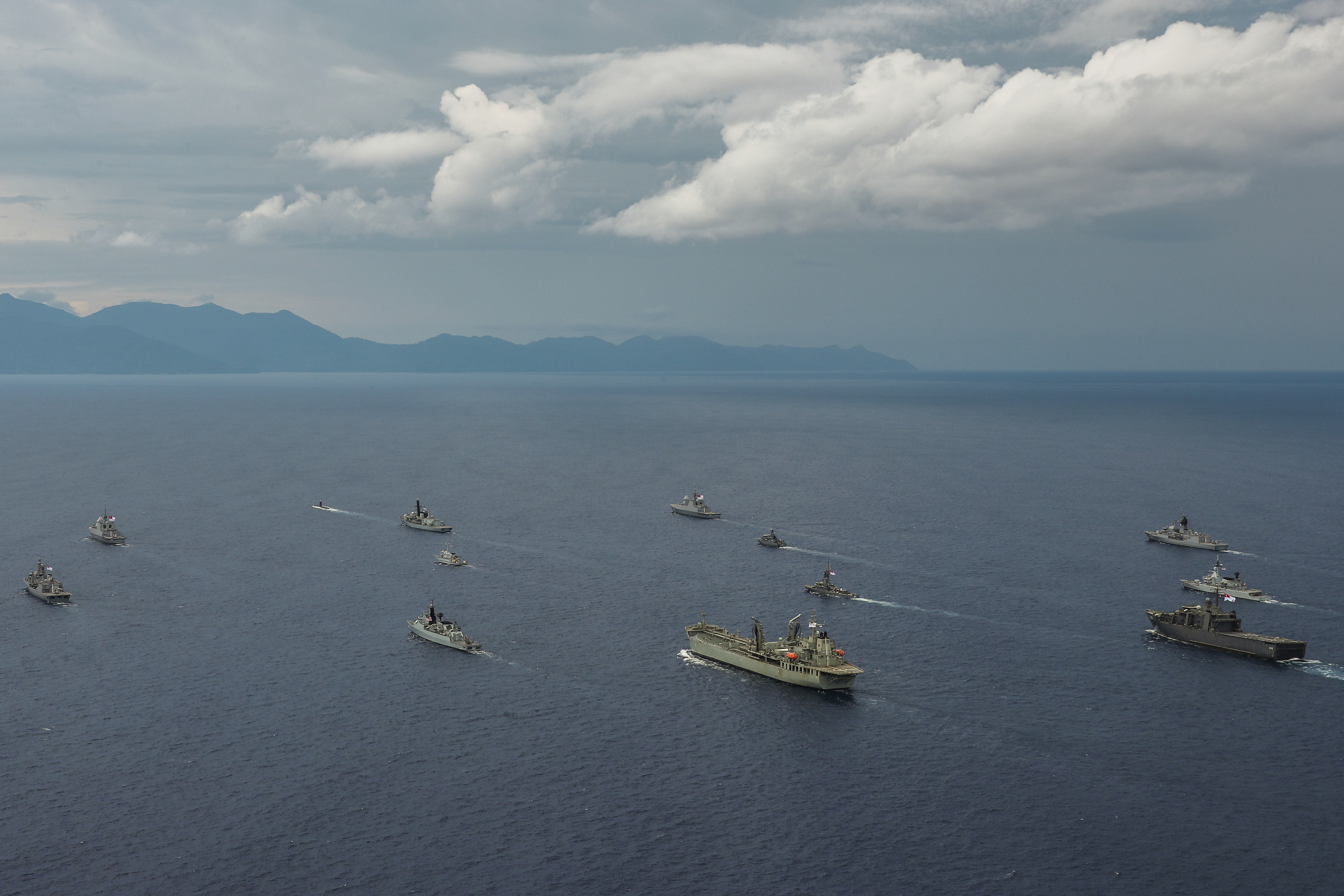
Ships of the Malaysian, Singapore, British, Australian and New Zealand Navy in the South China Sea during Exercise Bersama Lima, 2018

On 25 July 2020 Australia rejected China's claims to the South China Sea and filed a statement with the United Nations that said: "Australia rejects any claims to internal waters, territorial sea, exclusive economic zone and continental shelf based on such baselines," and there is "no legal basis" to draw the nine-dash line around the Four Sha archipelagos, Paracel and Spratly Islands or low-tide maritime zones. They encourage the claimants to resolve their disputes peacefully.

=== Cambodia ===
Cambodia has backed China over the dispute in ASEAN meetings, preventing consensus over unified ASEAN action. Anti-Vietnamese sentiment due to Vietnam's conquest of previously Cambodian lands, giving the Vietnamese a privileged status and encouragement of Vietnamese settlers in Cambodia during French colonial rule, and the occupation of Cambodia after the ousting of the Khmer Rouge has led to anti-Vietnamese feelings against ethnic Vietnamese in Cambodia and against Vietnam, and in turn has led to pro-China sentiment among the Cambodian government and the Cambodian opposition, including in the South China Sea.

=== India ===
India says that the South China Sea was "part of global commons and India has an abiding interest in peace and stability in the region... We firmly stand for the freedom of navigation and overflight and unimpeded lawful commerce in these international waterways, in accordance with international law, notably UNCLOS."

=== Indonesia ===
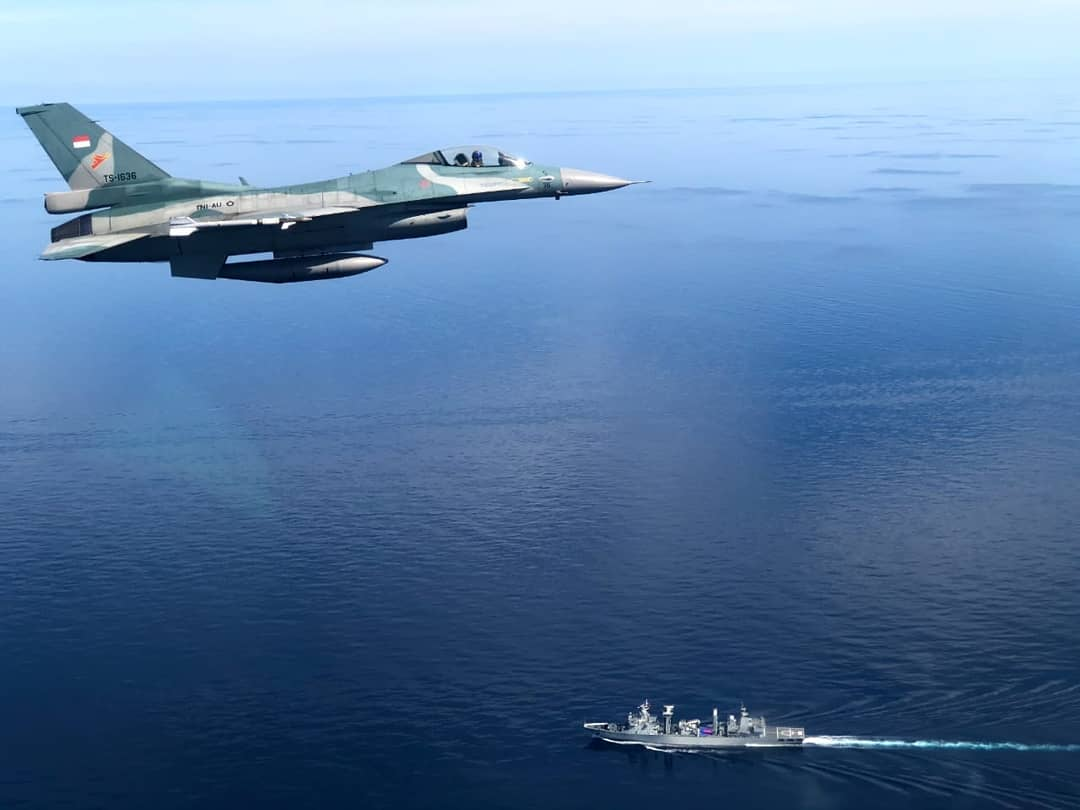
Indonesian Air Force F-16 Fighting Falcon flying over what appeared to be a PLAN Type 903 replenishment ship on the disputed waters off the coast of Natuna Islands, Riau Islands

Since early in the South China Sea dispute, Indonesia has repeatedly asserted its position as a non-claimant state in the original South China Sea dispute, and often positioned itself as an "honest broker". However, parts of China's unilaterally claimed nine-dash line overlap Indonesia's exclusive economic zone near the Natuna islands. Although China has acknowledged Indonesia's sovereignty over the Natuna islands, the PRC has argued that the waters around the Natuna islands are Chinese "traditional fishing grounds". Indonesia quickly dismissed China's claim, asserting that China's nine-dash line claim over parts of the Natuna islands has no legal basis. In November 2015, Indonesia's security chief Luhut Pandjaitan said Indonesia could take China before an international court. Indonesia filed a comment with the Permanent Court of Arbitration regarding China's claim in the arbitration. Indonesia's recent approach to one of the issues has been described in Javanese as being menang tanpa ngasorake which means winning the war without shaming the enemies.

Chinese fishing vessels – often escorted by Chinese coastguard ships – have repeatedly been reported to have breached Indonesian waters near the Natuna islands. On 19 March 2016, for example, Indonesian authorities tried to capture a Chinese trawler accused of illegal fishing in Indonesian waters, and arrested the Chinese crew. They were prevented from towing the boat to harbour by a Chinese coast guard vessel which reportedly "rammed" the trawler in Indonesian waters. "To prevent anything else occurring, the Indonesian authorities let go of the Chinese boat and then left toward Natuna, still with eight fishermen and the captain on board." On 21 March, Arrmanatha Nasir, a spokesman for Indonesia's Foreign Ministry, said that Indonesia still had the Chinese crew in custody, and Minister for Fisheries and Maritime Affairs Susi Pudjiastuti said that she would summon the Chinese ambassador, Xie Feng, to discuss this matter. Indonesia insists that they have the right to prosecute the Chinese trawler crew, despite Beijing's demand to release their eight fishermen. Arif Havas Oegroseno, the government official of maritime security, said that the Chinese claim of "traditional fishing grounds" was not recognised under the 1982 United Nations Convention on the Law of the Sea. This incident prompted security minister Luhut Pandjaitan to deploy more troops and patrol boats, and to strengthen the Ranai naval base in the area.

Following the clashes, on 23 June 2016, Indonesian President Joko Widodo visited the Natuna islands on a warship to demonstrate Indonesia's authority. He led a high-level delegation, which included the Commander of the Indonesian National Armed Forces (TNI) and state ministers. Security Minister Luhut Pandjaitan said it was meant to send a "clear message" that Indonesia was "very serious in its effort to protect its sovereignty".

Following the Permanent Court of Arbitration decision on 12 July 2016, Indonesia called on all parties involved in the territorial dispute to exercise self-restraint and to respect applicable international laws.

Indonesia challenged the Chinese nine-dash historical claim by arguing that if the historical claims can be used on presenting the territorial naval claims, Indonesia might also use its historical claims on the South China Sea by referring to the ancient influence of the Srivijaya and Majapahit empires.

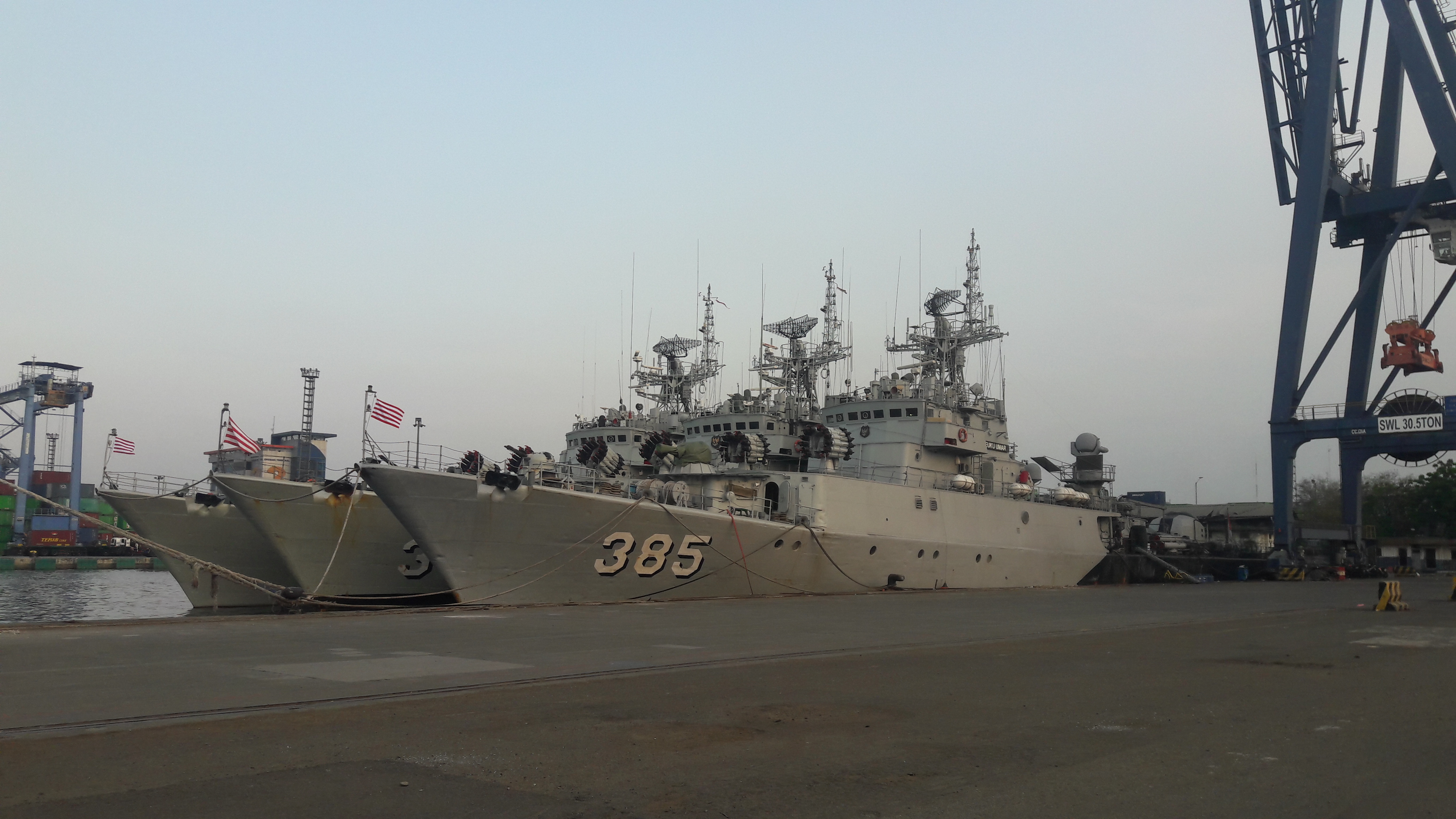
KRI Sutedi Senoputra 378 (background), KRI Tjiptadi 381 (centre), and KRI Teuku Umar 385 (foreground). These ships are often stationed in the Natuna Regency to protect Indonesian territory and its EEZ.

Indonesia's EEZ extends 200 nautical miles (370 km) from its shores, which around Natuna means it is slightly intersected by China's nine-dash line, defining its widely disputed claim to most of the South China Sea. In 2014–2015, the presence of the TNI on the islands was reinforced, which the Indonesian government hoped would reduce the chance of any conflict. Then in early 2020, a further 600 troops were deployed and eight navy warships from the Indonesian Navy including Ahmad Yani-class frigates, Bung Tomo-class corvettes, and Kapitan Pattimura-class ASW corvettes were sent to the area with support from the Indonesian Navy Naval Aviation CN-235 MPA, the Indonesian Air Force also sent 4 F-16 and a Boeing 737-2x9 Surveillance, and put BAE Hawk aircraft nearby on alert after Chinese fishing vessels increased illegal activity within the EEZ, escorted by a Chinese Coast Guard vessel. A recent visit to the area by President Joko Widodo displayed Indonesia's resolve to not overlook such incursions.

=== Japan ===
Japan has used "normative power" via strategic foreign aid to certain claimants in the dispute such as the Philippines and Vietnam in order to assert its presence in the region as promoting the "rule of law at sea."

=== The Quad ===
The Quadrilateral Security Dialogue (Quad)—comprising the United States, Japan, Australia, and India—has consistently expressed concern over developments in the South China Sea, emphasizing the necessity of upholding international law and regional stability.

China's increasingly assertive behaviour in the East and South China Seas, along with tensions along the India-China border, contributed significantly to the revival of the Quad grouping in 2017. While the initial iteration of the Quad in 2007 had dissipated amid shifting priorities, growing regional concerns over Beijing's actions led to renewed interest in institutionalized cooperation among the United States, Japan, Australia, and India. This was also shaped by former Japanese Prime Minister Shinzo Abe’s advocacy for a democratic security framework to uphold the “common good” in the Indo-Pacific.

Academic Bec Strating, professor of international relations at La Trobe University, describes the Quad countries’ cooperation on defense and foreign policy positions them as a "partner-of-choice" in the region compared with China.

The grouping often expresses concern over "unilateral actions" in the region and maintains support for a free and open Indo-Pacific. Quad leaders have stated that they support a region that is free, open, inclusive, healthy, rooted in democratic values, and free from coercion, presenting this as a “positive vision” for the Indo-Pacific that implicitly contrasts with China's model of regional order.

On 26 May 2026, the Quad criticized China over tensions in the South and East China Seas, accusing it of using coercive tactics and increasing militarization in disputed waters.

=== Singapore ===
Singapore has reiterated that it is not a claimant state in the South China Sea dispute and has offered to play a neutral role in being a constructive conduit for dialogue among the claimant states. Prime Minister Lee Hsien Loong said during his official visit to the US that he hoped all countries will respect international law and the outcome of arbitration. The spokesperson of China Hua Chunying responded in a press conference said that the award by the Arbitral Tribunal was "illegal" and "invalid", and thus not binding at all. She urged Singapore to respect China's position, stay objective and impartial.

=== Thailand ===
Thailand as one of the member of ASEAN played a coordinating role in facilitating China and ASEAN members involved in the dispute in hope of reaching peaceful resolution. Despite its domestic political turmoil, the Thai government relied on its Ministry of Foreign Affairs' expertise on international dispute. It took the initiative to hold several meetings with parties concerned. Thailand's first attempt was hosting the ASEAN–China Senior Officials' Meeting Retreat in Pattaya, Thailand 2012. Via this meeting, Wang Yi, the Chinese Foreign Minister called for a joint development of resources in South China Sea. Bangkok was viewed as a South China Sea neutral player because it is not a claimant and did not have disputes in the South China Sea with China. After several meetings, the 6th ASEAN–China SOM on DOC was the first official consultation on the Code of Conduct (COC) was formed with all parties agreement to push forward the drafting of COC. Thai-China relationship was generally seen as positive. Thailand's neutral position enabled it to act as a mediator and influence discussions among parties involved.

=== United States ===
SOUTH CHINA SEA: UP FOR GRABS (INR, 1971)

In 1974, the PRC received a non-involvement promise from the United States when it occupied the Yagong Island and the Crescent Group from South Vietnam. The United States officially addressed the South China Sea dispute for the first time in 1995, when its statement focused on the peaceful resolution of disputes, peace and stability, freedom of navigation, neutrality over the question of sovereignty, and respect of maritime norms. The 1995 statement did not name any states by their names.

The 1995 policy was changed in 2010, when the administration of the President Obama felt that even though the United States cannot take sides in the dispute, it still has to make a statement that it is not passively accepting the assertive actions taken in the region. At the July 2010 Association of Southeast Asian Nations Regional Forum meeting in Hanoi, Secretary of State Hillary Clinton gave a speech on resolving the disputes in the region without coercion and unequivocally stating that the South China Sea was a matter of U.S. national interest. Her comments were countered by China's Foreign Minister Yang Jiechi as "in effect an attack on China," and he warned the United States against making the South China Sea an international issue or multilateral issue.

In 2012, a United States State Department press statement identified the PRC as an assertive state in the region and communicated United States concerns about the developments in the area. Also in 2012, Secretary Clinton testified in support of congressional approval of the Law of the Sea Convention, which would strengthen U.S. ability to support countries that oppose Chinese claims to certain islands in the area. On 29 May 2012, a spokesman for the Chinese Foreign Ministry expressed concern over this development, stating that "non-claimant Association of South East Asian Nations countries and countries outside the region have adopted a position of not getting involved into territorial disputes." In July 2012, the United States Senate passed resolution 524, initially sponsored by Senator John Kerry, stating (among other things) the United States' strong support for the 2002 declaration of conduct of parties in the South China Sea, reaffirms the United States' commitment to assist the nations of Southeast Asia to remain strong and independent, and supports enhanced operations by the United States armed forces in the Western Pacific.

In 2014, the United States responded to China's claims over the fishing grounds of other nations by saying that "China has not offered any explanation or basis under international law for these extensive maritime claims." USN CNO Jonathan Greenert then pledged American support to the Philippines in its territorial conflicts with the PRC. The Chinese Foreign Ministry asked the United States to maintain a neutral position on the issue. In 2014 and 2015, the United States continued freedom of navigation operations ("FONOPs"), including in the South China Sea.

In May 2015, the Wall Street Journal reported that the “US Navy regularly conducts freedom of navigation transits in the region ... [but] has yet to receive explicit authorization from the administration to do so within 12 nautical miles of the artificial islands”. At the Shangri-La Dialogue on May 30, 2015, Secretary of Defense Ash Carter drew attention to China's artificial islands, stating that: “China is out of step with...international rules [as] turning an underwater rock into an airfield simply does not afford the rights of sovereignty or permit restrictions on international air or maritime transit. ... All countries should have the right to freedom of navigation [and] America, alongside its allies and partners in the [region] will not be deterred from exercising these rights.” On September 18, 2015, the Chinese Foreign Ministry replied by stating that “China, like the US, champions navigation freedom in the South China Sea, but opposes any country’s attempt to challenge China’s territorial sovereignty ... under the pretext of safeguarding navigation freedom.” At the start of October 2015, the US Department of Defense made it clear that a FONOP within 12 nautical miles of one of China's artificial islands was “not a question of if, but when”, and by mid-October 2015, US officials said the FONOP was expected "within days". On 27 October 2015, the US destroyer USS Lassen navigated within 12 nautical miles of reclaimed land in the Subi Reef as the first in a series of "Freedom of Navigation Operations". This was the first time since 2012 that the US has directly challenged China's claims of the island's territorial limit. On 8–9 November 2015, two US B-52 strategic bombers flew near artificial Chinese-built islands in the area of the Spratly Islands and were contacted by Chinese ground controllers but continued their mission undeterred.

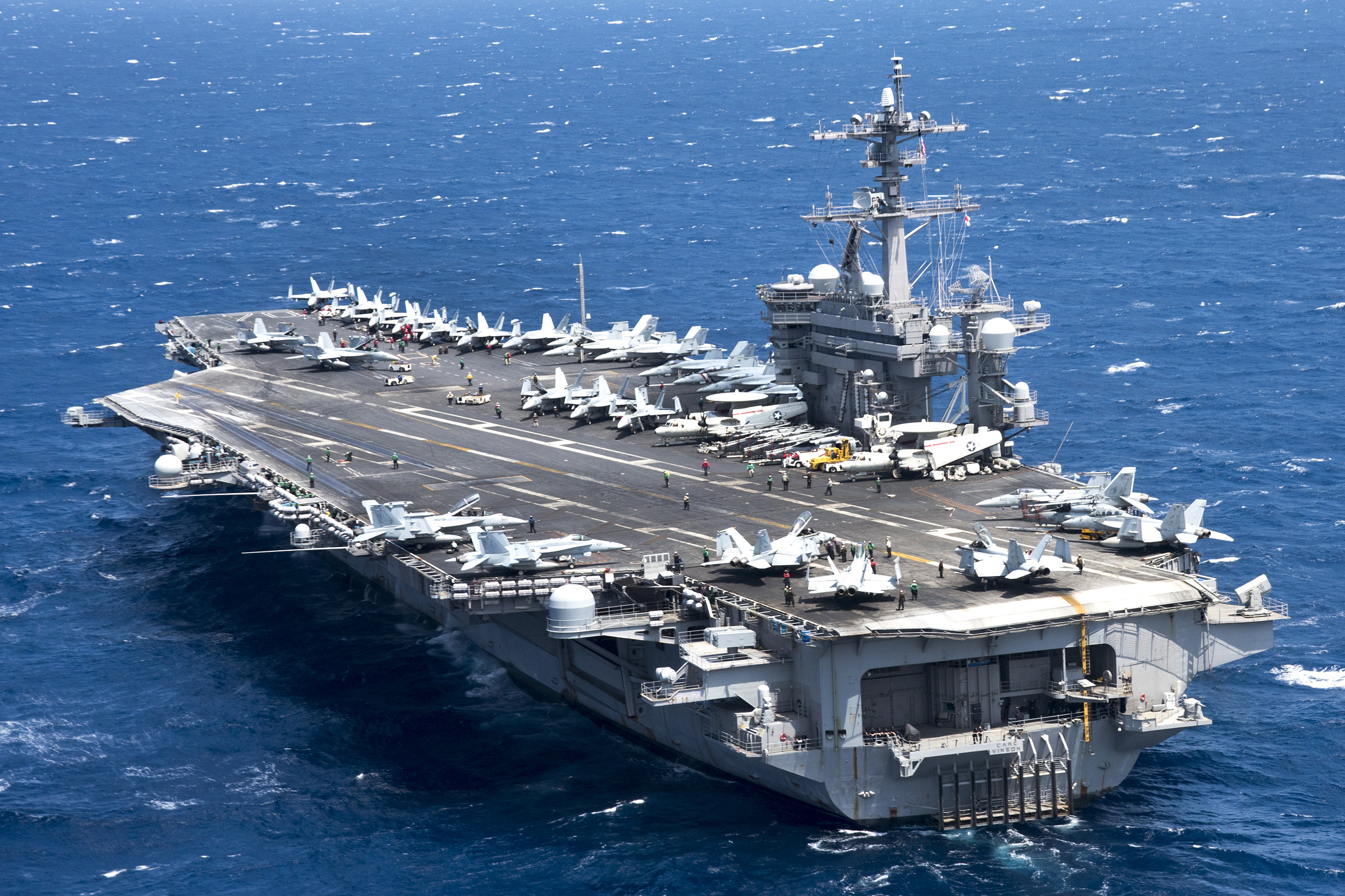
The USS Carl Vinson underway in the South China Sea, 2017

President Trump's administration increased the frequency of freedom of navigation operations in the South China Sea. In June 2020, US Ambassador to the United Nations Kelly Craft sent a letter to the U.N. secretary general explaining the US position on China's "excessive maritime claims." On 14 July 2020, US Secretary of State Mike Pompeo declared China's claims and coercions of in parts of the South China Sea “completely unlawful”. On 26 August 2020, the US sanctioned individuals and 24 Chinese companies linked to construction and militarization of the artificial islands.

Publications by US think tanks have made recommendations for courses of actions that the United States could take in response to PRC activities in the South China Sea.

The US Navy has conducted freedom of navigation drills in the South China Sea to counter Vietnamese claims in the region, particularly around the Côn Đảo islands.

The US, Japan and the Philippines conducted military exercises intended to "(ensure) that all countries are free to fly, sail, and operate wherever international law allows" on April 7, 2024, in advance of a planned trilateral summit. The Southern Theater Command of China's PLA issued statements saying it was organizing "joint naval and air combat patrols in the South China Sea" and "All military activities that mess up the situation in the South China Sea and create hotspots are under control".

=== Other countries ===
Kabir Hashim, General Secretary of the United National Party of Sri Lanka, said in 2022 that the South China Sea disputes should be resolved through bilateral talks between China and the countries concerned rather than being subject to external forces. In 2016, Yemen expressed support for China's position on the South China Sea issues. In a 2024 joint statement, Pakistan expressed support for China's position in the South China Sea. Belarus has also expressed support for China's position.

== See also ==
- North Borneo dispute
- Chinese social media claim on Palawan
- Regional reactions to China's maritime activities in the South China Sea
- Scarborough Shoal standoff
- Spratly Islands dispute
- Chinese expansionism
- Territorial disputes of the People's Republic of China
