= The Great Indoors =

The Great Indoors may refer to:

- The Great Indoors (department store)
- The Great Indoors (TV series)
- "The Great Indoors", an episode of season 3 of Phineas and Ferb

== See also ==
- The Great Outdoors (disambiguation)
