= Indrapuri, Aceh Besar =

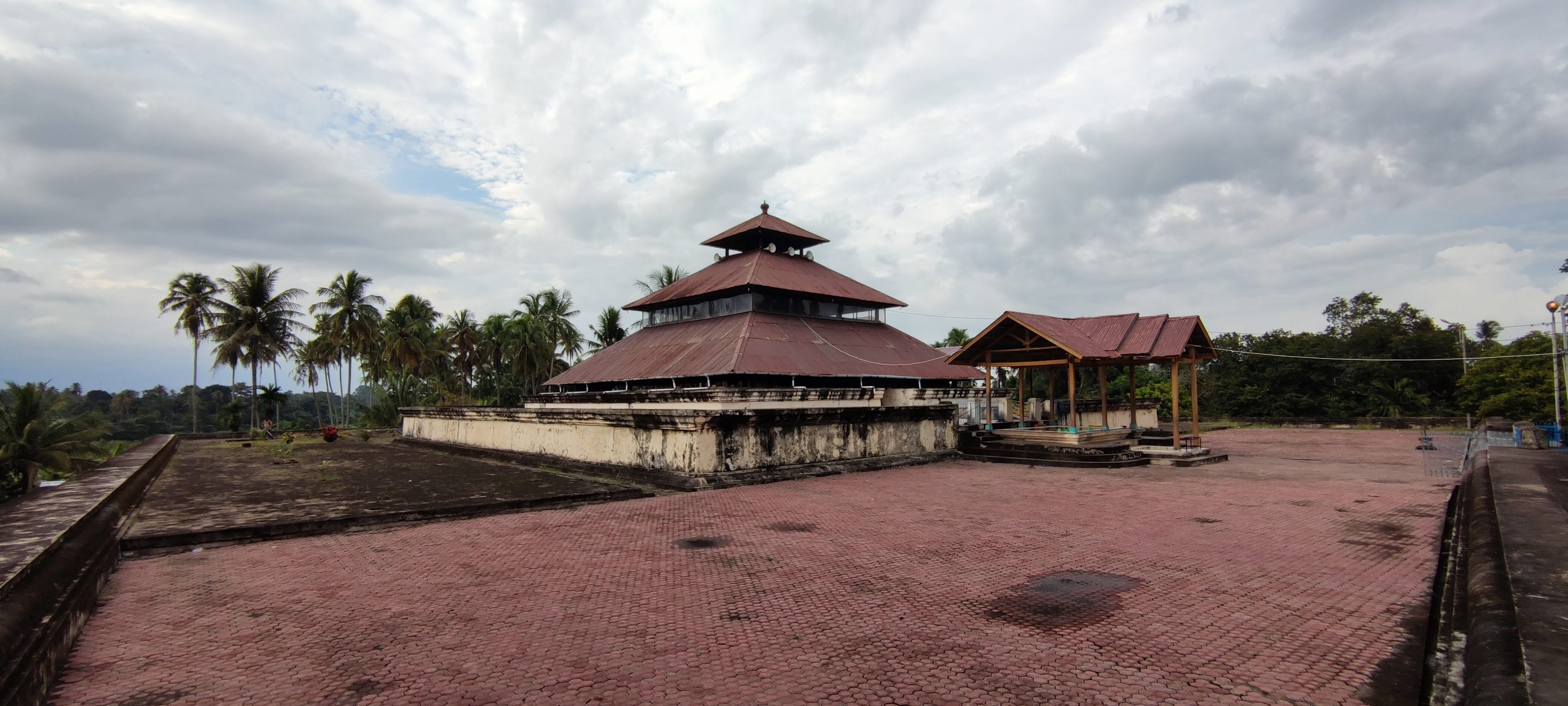
Indrapuri Old Mosque, 2021

Indrapuri is an administrative district (kecamatan) in Aceh Besar Regency, in Aceh Province of Indonesia. It lies to the southeast of the city of Banda Aceh.

It covers a land area of 197.04 km^{2} and had a population of 19,975 at the 2010 Census and 22,372 at the 2020 Census; the official estimate as at mid 2024 was 24,506. The district encompasses 52 villages (gampong), all sharing the post code of 23363; the largest (by population in mid 2024) were Krueng Lamkareung (1,513), Aneuk Glee (1,062) and Reukih Dayah (1,053).
