= Regional reactions to China's maritime activities in the South China Sea =

Regional reactions to China's maritime activities in the South China Sea involve how China's maritime activities within the South China Sea have caused a wide range of reactions and responses from countries bordering the South China Sea, such as Vietnam, the Philippines, Taiwan (Republic of China), Malaysia, Indonesia, Brunei and Singapore.

== Background ==
Many nation-states, with the exception of Singapore, possess overlapping territorial claims within the South China Sea, which are also at odds with China's claims. China's maritime actions in the South China Sea include a broad range of measures, such as the deployment of maritime militias, the coast guard, and artificial land reclamation. China has argued that their maritime activities are carried out to bolster China's maritime claims in the South China Sea, including areas within the nine-dash line, which has been ruled as going against the UNCLOS. According to various scholars, the measures China have been using can be described as salami-slicing, grey-zone warfare, and lawfare. The responses towards China's maritime activities from its regional South-Eastern neighbors vary from deterrence, escalation and diplomatic protests to appeasement, de-escalation and cooperation.

== Vietnam ==
Vietnam and China have been engaged in longstanding territorial disputes within the South China Sea, culminating in the Chinese takeover of the Paracel Islands in 1974 and expansion in the Spratly Islands in 1988. China's maritime actions against Vietnamese maritime sovereignty takes the shape of apprehension of sinking Vietnamese fishing boats to the seizing of maritime territories within the Johnson South Reef, Spratly Islands and the Paracel Islands through salami-slicing techniques.

Recently in May 2022 Hanoi protested against Chinese naval drills near the Paracel Islands with Le Thi Thu Hang, spokesperson of the Ministry of Foreign Affairs stating that "China’s military drills in Hoang Sa archipelago seriously violate Vietnam’s sovereignty over these islands."

In response to China's maritime behavior in the South China Sea, Vietnam together with the Philippines, have been the frontline actor in opposing China's actions in the South China Sea. The response from Vietnam against China's maritime actions include the deployment of their own fishing militias, military modernization, and lawfare. Internationally, Vietnam has also been using its influence within the Association of Southeast Asian Nations (ASEAN) to rein in China's maritime ambitions while also deepening strategic cooperation with the United States and other major powers. For Vietnam, these multi-pronged measures serve as a demonstration of its readiness to preserve its sovereignty.

However, the intensity of Vietnam's opposition has varied over time, which experts argue is due to Vietnam needing a stable bilateral relations with China to maintain its own economic development, as China is its largest trading partner. Thus, there have been several instances which saw Vietnam engage in appeasement policies towards China, especially when the former feels like it can concede ground. According to various expert in the field, the reasoning behind Vietnam's varying responses serve to “keep the diplomatic channels with Beijing open”, while also upholding the bilateral agreements it has with China.

Thus, various experts argue that Vietnam's response towards China's maritime within the South China Sea is confined itself to any particular kind of action in response to China's actions. On the contrary, Vietnam has employed a wide range of responses from military modernization to defense diplomacy displaying a degree of situational deftness. Thus, Vietnam's response to China's actions in the South China Sea highlights the former's balancing act of appeasement while simultaneously keeping its sovereignty and maritime interests intact.

== The Philippines ==
The Philippines and China have been engaging in longstanding territorial disputes within the South China Sea. This has led to instances from the apprehension of Filipino fishermen by Chinese authorities to armed stand-offs in Scarborough Shoal, leading to the Chinese take-over of the maritime area. And recently in April 2023, ships representing the coast guards from both countries faced off with each other near Second Thomas Shoal.

The reactions from the Philippines to China's maritime activities have included apprehending of Chinese fishermen, international condemnation, lawfare, launching media campaigns and defense cooperation with the United States. Just recently in May 2023, following the visit by Philippine President Bongbong Marcos to the White House, the US highlighted its willingness in defending Philippine sovereignty. Thus, similar with Vietnam, the Philippines are also a front-runner nation regarding opposing China's actions in the South China Sea.

Despite the opposition, the Philippines have also displayed various degrees of leniency regarding China's behavior in the South China Sea. According to an article published by the Asian Yearbook of International Law, an example of this is how the Philippines handled the ruling from the South China Sea Arbitration concerning the legal issues of China's 9-dash claim Although with the legal ruling in favor of them, the Philippines still downplayed its significance while expressing a willingness to negotiate, highlighting a post-decision shift to a more accommodating position towards China. Several scholars in this field argue that this is due to the significance China being the Philippines' largest trading partner, giving the former economic leverage over the other.

An article published by the Pacific Review has described that the Philippines’ response to China both incorporate a tough political stance while also incorporating leniency through a softer stance which favors cooperation rather than confrontation against the latter. According to various scholars, these varying reactions from the Philippines towards China highlights the asymmetry between both belligerents, which leads to the Philippines’ quid pro quo behavior towards China. Thus, highlighting the Philippines' attempt to offset the disparity in capabilities it has compared to China.

== Taiwan ==
Historically, the Republic of China expressed its interest in the South China Sea by publishing the eleven-dash line. After retreating to Taiwan, it worked with the People's Republic of China (PRC) on the mainland over their shared claims. Differences emerged after the PRC removed two of the original dashes near Vietnam from its map in the 1950s. Taiwan through its constitution still claims sovereignty over parts of the South China Sea but controls only the Pratas Island and the Taiping Island. Losing official diplomatic recognition from other countries has made it difficult for Taiwan to assert its claims and distinguish them from PRC's.

== Malaysia ==
Throughout the time Malaysia's reactions and subsequent responses towards China's maritime actions within the South China Sea have mostly been of an appeasing nature, with Malaysia adopting a "playing it safe" approach towards China. Thus, highlighting Malaysia's prioritization of its bilateral relationship with China instead of enforcing its maritime claims within the South China Sea. This behavior has been embodied in Malaysia not engaging in much criticism toward China's claims in the South China Sea, but rather engaging in dialogue. Scholars in the field have argued that this is mainly due to China being the largest trading partner to Malaysia. Just recently in May 2023, China pledged to invest a record sum of 170 billion Malaysian ringgit into the Malaysian economy, highlighting its status as Malaysia largest trading partner in 14 consecutive years.

However, in recent times there has been various points of contention between both countries, which mainly revolve around maritime boundary delimitation of the continental shelf and the proper allocation of resources within the South China Sea. This has culminated in the prime minister of Malaysia, Anwar Ibrahim in 2023 declaring that Malaysia's position regarding the South China Sea is to firmly protect its sovereign rights and interests in the South China Sea. However at the same time, Anwar Ibrahim also expressed that Malaysia is still open for negotiation with China, while describing Malaysia as a friend of China. This has led to criticism from Anwar Ibrahim's political opponents for being too soft towards China. Following the criticism regarding Anwar Ibrahim's statements, the Ministry of Foreign Affairs has declared that: “the government is firmly committed to protecting Malaysia’s sovereignty, sovereign rights and interests in its maritime areas in the South China Sea”. Furthermore, the statement also called all parties to maintain peace, stability and trade in accordance with the UNCLOS declarations, which means that Malaysia will continue the diplomatic approach with other states, including China.

An article from the Geopolitical Monitor argues that Malaysia's recent behavior could be a sign for the beginning of a foreign policy shift, in which Malaysia has shifted from appeasement politics to a non-alignment policy when dealing with China. This includes engaging in the process confidence-building between all the ASEAN and China to ensure stability in the region.

== Brunei ==
Brunei's reactions to China's maritime actions in the South China Sea have been limited and cautious in nature. Compared to its regional peers, the South China Sea does not appear to hold as much significance in the relation between Brunei and China. Among the Association of Southeast Asian Nations (ASEAN), Brunei rarely assumes a leading role in matters related to the South China Sea. Instead, the country is committed to using diplomatic channels to address the dispute, rather than resorting to military action. According to an article published by the National Bureau of Asian Research, the caution displayed by Brunei regarding international matters with China is due to the former's small-state strategy when interacting with the latter. This is exemplified by how Brunei is not asserting its claims in the South China Sea. Experts within the field argues that this non-assertiveness is due to Brunei sidelining its political interests in the South China Sea to secure future economic cooperation and gains with China. This cooperation is, according to various experts, essential for Brunei to engage in due to the small-power nation-state facing an uncertain economic future.

== Indonesia ==
In response to China's maritime actions in the South China Sea, Indonesia has maintained the stance of not having any overlapping claims with the former. The Indonesian authorities argue that the following is mainly due to Indonesia not considering China is among its ten neighboring countries. Nevertheless, Indonesia has rejected China's nine-dash line as the basis for the latter's claims in the South China Sea. Furthermore, Indonesia has still responded to China's naval presence and maritime behavior in the South China Sea, especially near the Natuna Sea which is part of Indonesia's exclusive economic zone (EEZ). This has led to several instances within the Natuna Sea which pitted the Indonesian navy against its Chinese counterparts in a naval standoff. According to an article published by the Asian Journal of Political Science, these instances have led to Indonesia becoming stauncher in protecting its territorial sovereignty, especially its exclusive economic zone (EEZ) around the Natuna Islands. According to experts within this field, Indonesia's response towards China's maritime actions can be described as "soft assertiveness", as Indonesia is balancing act between its own national interests while refraining from antagonizing China. The behavior highlights its stakes as a non-claimant state wishing for ASEAN unity and centrality against the domination of a single major power within the South China Sea. Furthermore, the status of a non-claimant state allows Indonesia to elevate its diplomatic prestige by offering and facilitating multilateral and consensus-building dialogue between China and its Southeast Asian neighbors.

On the 22 February 2023, diplomatic envoys from both nations met in Jakarta led by Retno Marsudi Indonesia's Foreign Minister and his Chinese counterpart Qin Gang, to intensify the discussion of a code of conduct within the South China Sea. Thus, highlighting Indonesia's commitment as a neutral mediator regarding the disputes found in the South China Sea.

== Singapore ==
Singapore has long proclaimed its status as a non-claimant state concerning the South China Sea, showing flexibility and adaptiveness to China's maritime activities in Southeast Asia and the South China Sea. Furthermore, Singapore has long been a proponent for all parties through diplomacy have to manage their differences peacefully in accordance with international law, including UNCLOS. Thus, Singapore has been a proponent for further cooperation between ASEAN and China, becoming a leader and mediator for regional maritime cooperation in the South China Sea.

In May 2023, the Foreign Minister of Singapore Vivian Balakrishnan voiced grave concern after a near collision between Chinese and Philippine vessels. The minister stressed that all nations, including superpowers, have to work together to ensure "free access and opportunities" within Southeast Asia and its sea lanes.

According to an article published by the Diplomat, Singapore's particular reactions towards China is due to the latter being Singapore's largest trading partner, while simultaneously enjoying strong bilateral and security links with the AUKUS. Therefore, despite Singapore's Western-leaning position, the city-state has avoided taking sides with the United States in a conflict with China. Recently in April 2023, both Singapore and China conducted joint naval exercises in the South China Sea, highlighting both parties' military cooperation.

According to an article published by Asia Policy, Singapore's particular reaction towards China is due to the former's ambitions of being an effective coordinator and honest broker between the various claimant states. This ensures cooperation and freedom of navigation, which in the end would benefit Singapore's national interests as well.

== See also ==
- Brunei–China relations
- China–Vietnam relations
- China–Philippines relations
- China–Malaysia relations
- China–Indonesia relations
- China–Singapore relations
- Incidents in the South China Sea
