= Indrapuri, Patna =

Indrapuri
- locality
- Location in Patna, India
- Coordinates: 25°37′18″N 85°6′8″E
- Country: India
- State: Bihar
- District: Patna
- City: Patna

Government
  - Body: Patna Municipal Corporation
- Time zone: UTC+5:30 (IST)
- Pincode: 800024

Indrapuri is a neighbourhood in Patna, in the Indian state Bihar. This area is under the jurisdiction of Pataliputra police station of Patna Police.
