= Indrapuri, Bhopal =

Indrapuri
- locality
- Location of Indrapuri in Bhopal
- Coordinates: 23°15′7″N 77°27′43″E
- Country: India
- State: Madhya Pradesh
- District: Bhopal
- City: Bhopal

Government
  - Body: Bhopal Municipal Corporation
- Time zone: UTC+5:30 (IST)
- Pincode: 462021
- Telephone: +91755
- Vehicle registration: MP-04-

Indrapuri (Hindi: इन्द्रपुरी) is a town in Bhopal, India, in the BHEL township in the city of Bhopal.

== Etymology ==
Indra is King of the demi-gods or Devas and Lord of Heaven or Svargaloka in Hindu mythology. He is also the God of War, Storms, and Rainfall. Alkapuri (incidentally, another locality in Bhopal) is another name of Swarga and is also called Indrapuri (Indra's estate).
