= International crisis =

Crisis in relations between states

The term international crisis is a widespread term without a single common definition. To some, it involves "a sequence of interactions between the governments of two or more sovereign states in severe conflict, short of actual war, but involving the perception of a dangerously high probability of war".

== Types ==
Richard Ned Lebow, an American political scientist, gives a breakdown of three types of international crises:

- Justification of hostilities. One of the nations decides, before the crisis starts, to go to war and constructs a crisis to justify it. The pattern of justification is almost always the same: Rouse public opinion, make impossible demands, try to legitimize the demands, deny your real intentions then employ the rejection of the demands as a reason for war. A recent example, commonly employed by critics of George W. Bush, is the Iraq disarmament crisis, which precipitated the Iraq War.
- Spinoff crisis. The nations are involved in a war or crisis with another nation or nations and this precipitates another crisis, e.g., the Lusitania incident in 1915.
- Brinkmanship. Intentionally forcing a crisis to get the other side to back down. The Cuban Missile Crisis of 1962 is a well-known example of brinkmanship.

With the exception of a justification of hostilities, the study of international crises assumes that neither side actually wants to go to war, but must be visibly prepared to do so.

== Strategies ==
A book edited by Alexander L. George, an American behavioral scientist, presents an overview of the process and conflicting goals of crisis management as well as many examples. It discusses a number of strategies, including:

=== Offensive strategies ===
- blackmail
- limited and reversible response
- controlled pressure
- attrition
- fait accompli

=== Defensive strategies ===
- coercion
- limited escalation
- tit-for-tat
- test of capabilities
- "drawing a line"
- buying-time strategy
- conveying commitment and resolve to avoid miscalculation by the adversary
- collective security

== List of defused crises ==
International crises tend to result in war, almost by definition; they are then remembered best not as crises but as causes of wars. For information on international crises that resulted immediately in war, see list of wars.

Given the above, some of the crises that are best-known as crises were defused. The following crises did not immediately provoke large-scale violence:

(in chronological order)

- Falklands Crisis of 1770
- Nootka Crisis (1789)
- XYZ Affair (1797–1798) – between the United States of America and the First French Republic
- Oriental Crisis of 1840
- Oregon boundary dispute (1844–1846) – between the United States of America and British North America
- Don Pacifico affair (1850)
- Neuchâtel Crisis (1856–1857)
- Pig War (1859)
- Trent Affair (1861)
- Luxembourg Crisis (1867)
- Belgian railway crisis (1868–1869)
- War in sight crisis (1875)
- Panjdeh incident (1885)
- Samoan crisis (1887–1889) – between the United States of America, United Kingdom, and Germany
- Anglo-Portuguese Crisis (1889–1890)
- Venezuelan crisis of 1895 – between Venezuela and the United Kingdom
- Fashoda Incident (1898–1899)
- Baltimore crisis (1891–1892)
- Venezuelan crisis of 1902–1903 – between Venezuela and Britain, Germany and Italy
- First Moroccan Crisis (1904–1906)
- Dutch–Venezuelan crisis of 1908 – between Venezuela and the Netherlands
- Bosnian crisis (1908–1909)
- Kivu frontier incident (1909–1910)
- Agadir Crisis (1911)
- July Crisis (1914) – The final event that led up to WWI
- Åland crisis (1916–1920)
- Corfu incident (1923)
- Abyssinia Crisis (1935–1936)
- Remilitarization of the Rhineland (1936)
- Anschluss (1938)
- May Crisis (1938)
- Sudetenland Crisis (1938)
- Levant Crisis (1945) – between the United Kingdom and Syria, France
- Turkish Straits crisis (1946–1953)
- Iran crisis (1946–1947)
- Berlin Blockade (1948–1949)
- First Taiwan Strait Crisis (1954–1955)
- Syrian Crisis of 1957
- 1958 Lebanon crisis
- Second Taiwan Strait Crisis (1958)
- Cod Wars (1958–1976)
- Berlin Crisis of 1961
- Lobster War (1961–1963)
- Cuban Missile Crisis (1962)
- Nathu La and Cho La clashes (1967)
- Pueblo incident (1968)
- Sino-Soviet border conflict (1969)
- Panmunjom axe murder incident (1976)
- Beagle conflict (1978)
- Iran hostage crisis (1979–1981)
- Havana Peruvian embassy crisis (1980)
- Able Archer 83 (1983)
- Sumdorong Chu standoff (1986–1987)
- Operation Brasstacks (1986–1987)
- Caldas crisis (1987)
- 1994 North Korean nuclear crisis
- Turbot War (1995)
- Third Taiwan Strait Crisis (1995–1996)
- 2001 Kodori crisis – between Georgia, Russia, and the breakaway statelet of Abkhazia
- Pankisi Gorge crisis (2000–2002) – between Georgia and Russia, with involvement from the United States, Chechen separatists, and transnational jihadists
- Hainan Island incident (2001) – between the United States of America and China
- Perejil Island crisis (2002)
- 2005 Mexico–Venezuela diplomatic crisis
- 2006 Kodori crisis – between Georgia, Russia, and the breakaway statelet of Abkhazia
- 2007 Morocco–Spain diplomatic conflict – between the Ceuta and Melilla region of Spain
- 2008 Andean diplomatic crisis
- 2008–2011 Cambodian–Thai border crisis
- 2010 Colombia–Venezuela diplomatic crisis
- 2010 Senkaku boat collision incident
- 2011 Argentina–United States diplomatic crisis
- First North Kosovo crisis (2011–2013)
- 2011 India–Pakistan border skirmish
- 2012–2013 Ecuador–United Kingdom diplomatic crisis
- Senkaku Islands tensions (2012–2013)
- 2013 India–Pakistan border skirmishes
- 2013 Dominican Republic–Haiti diplomatic crisis
- 2014 Panama–Venezuela diplomatic crisis
- 2014–2015 India–Pakistan border skirmishes
- 2016–2018 India–Pakistan border skirmishes
- North Korea crisis (2017–2018)
- Qatar diplomatic crisis (2017–2021)
- 2017 China–India border standoff
- 2018 Kuwait–Philippines diplomatic crisis
- 2018 Panama–Venezuela diplomatic crisis
- 2019 India–Pakistan border skirmishes
- 2019–2020 Mexico–Bolivia diplomatic crisis
- 2020–2021 China–India skirmishes
- 2020–21 India–Pakistan border skirmishes
- Belarus–European Union border crisis (2021)
- 2022 Melilla border incident
- 2023 India–Pakistan border skirmishes
- Nigerien crisis (2023–2024)
- Canada–India diplomatic crisis (2023–2025)
- Guyana—Venezuela crisis (2023–2024)
- 2025 Slovakia–Ukraine gas dispute
- Greenland crisis (2025–2026)
- 2025 India–Pakistan conflict
- 2025 Cambodian–Thai border crisis
- Azerbaijan–Russia diplomatic crisis (2025)
- 2026 Druzhba pipeline dispute

== Ongoing crises ==
(in chronological order)

- Korean conflict (1945 – ongoing)
  - North Korea and weapons of mass destruction
  - List of border incidents involving North and South Korea
- Israeli–Palestinian conflict (1947 – ongoing)
- Indo-Pakistani wars and conflicts (1947 – ongoing)
- Territorial disputes in the South China Sea (1950s – ongoing)
- Cyprus problem (1963 – ongoing)
- Iran–Saudi Arabia proxy conflict (1979 – ongoing)
  - Iraqi conflict (2003 – ongoing)
- Crisis in Venezuela (2010 – ongoing)
- Libyan crisis (2011 – ongoing)
- Syrian Civil War (2011 – 2024)
  - Aftermath of the Syrian civil war (2024 – Ongoing)
- Russo-Ukrainian war (2014 – ongoing)
- Yemeni Civil War (2015 – ongoing)
- Rohingya genocide (2017 – ongoing)
- Lebanese crisis (2019 – ongoing)
- Democratic Republic of the Congo–Rwanda conflict (2022 – ongoing)
- Second North Kosovo crisis (2022 – Ongoing)
- Fourth Taiwan Strait Crisis (2022 – ongoing)
- Benin–Niger crisis (2023 – ongoing)
- 2025–2026 Brazil–United States diplomatic dispute (2025 – ongoing)
- 2025–2026 Spain–United States diplomatic crisis (2025 – ongoing)
- 2025–2026 China–Japan diplomatic crisis (2025 – ongoing)
- Poland–Ukraine diplomatic crisis (2026 – ongoing)
- Ceuta migrant crisis (2026 – ongoing)

== See also ==
- Crisis
- Crisis management
- Diplomacy
- G20
- International relations
- Negotiations
- United Nations
- World Bank
- Category:Wikipedia categories named after diplomatic crises
