= 2014 Panama–Venezuela diplomatic crisis =

Differences between Maduro and Martinelli

- Part of Crisis in Venezuela
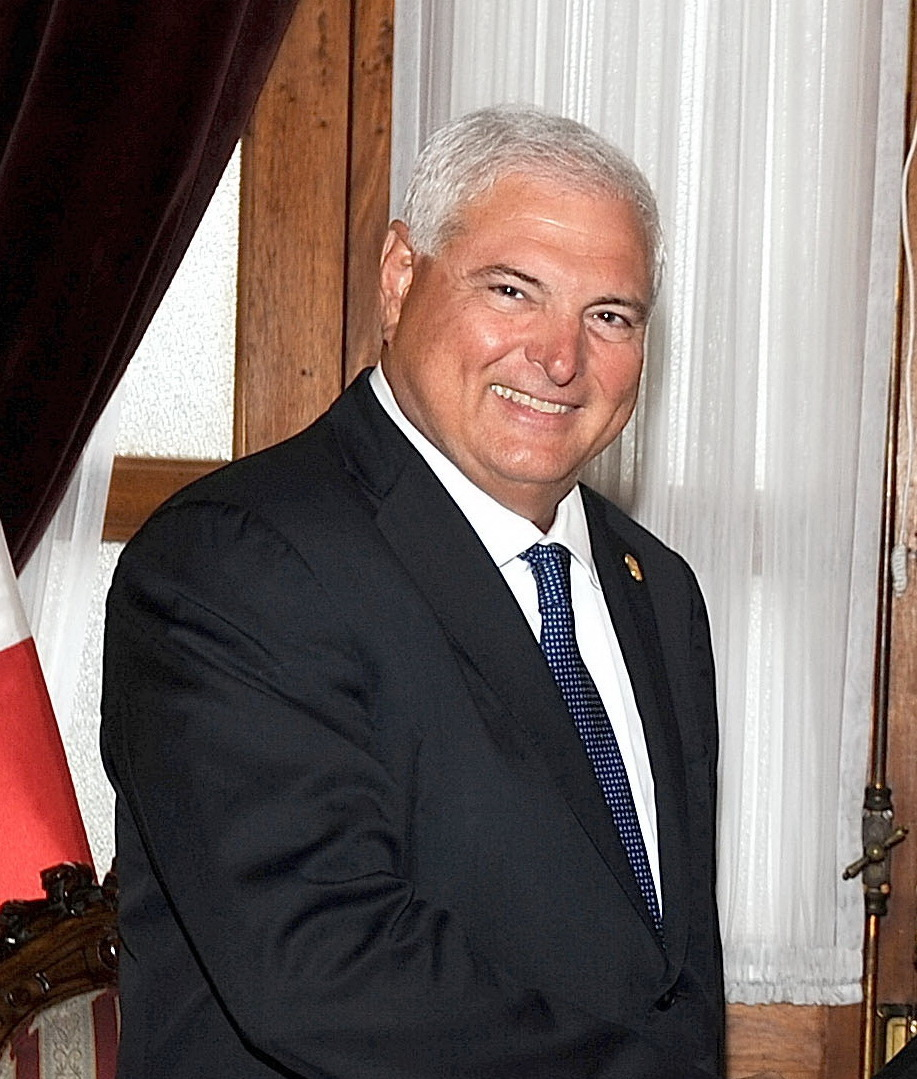
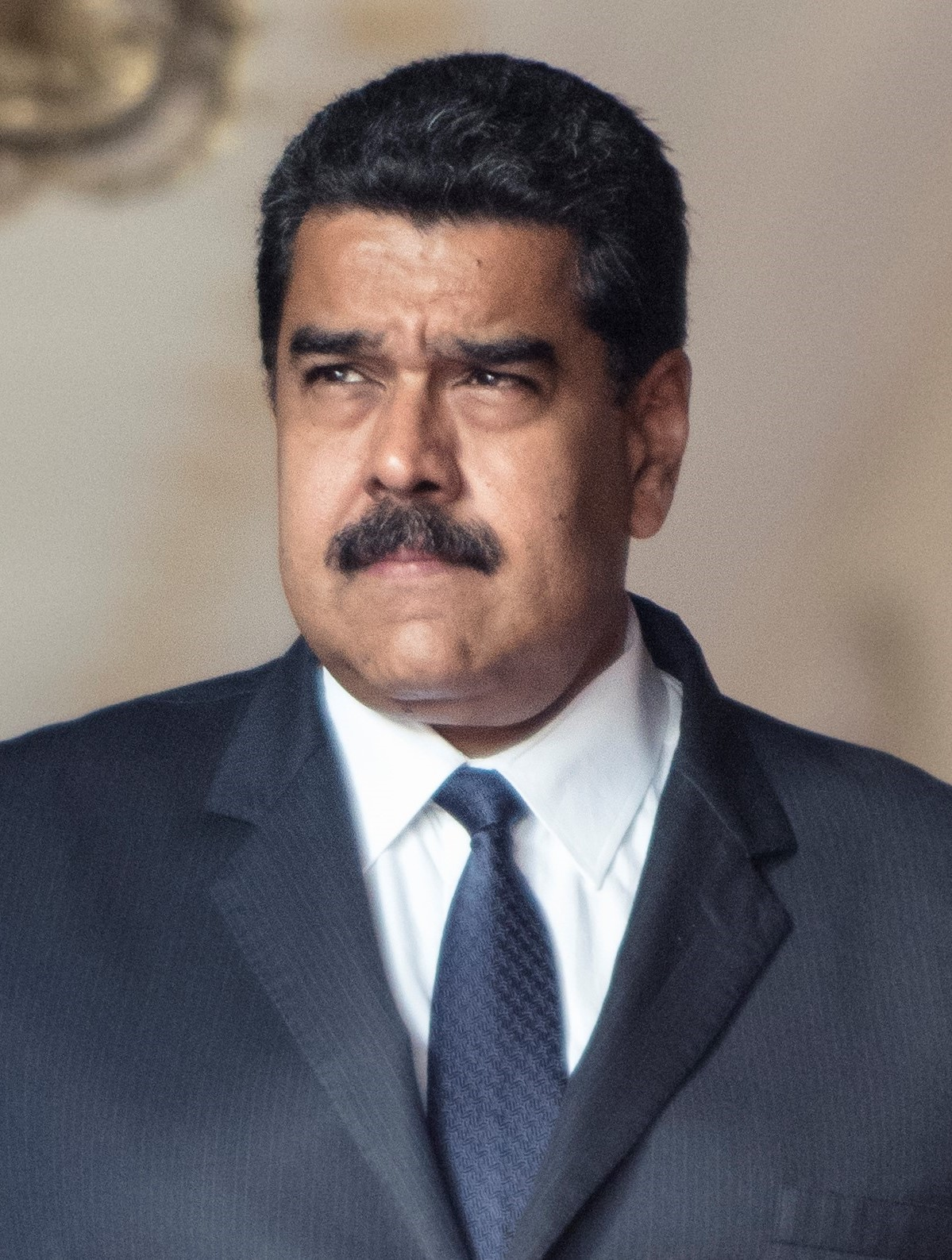
- Panamanian president Ricardo Martinelli (left) and Venezuelan president Nicolás Maduro (right)
- Date: 5 March 2014 – 1 July 2014
- Location: Panama and Venezuela
- Caused by: Accusations by the Venezuelan government of interference by Panama in their internal affairs, arising from the 2014 Venezuelan protests by Venezuelan opposition members and students against the government of Nicolás Maduro
- Result: Relations restored following the election of opposition leader Juan Carlos Varela as the new Panamanian president, and both countries agreed to restore diplomatic relations

Parties
Panama	Venezuela

Lead figures
Ricardo Martinelli (President of Panama)	Nicolás Maduro (President of Venezuela)

The 2014 Panama–Venezuela diplomatic crisis refers to the differences that arose between the Venezuelan government of Nicolás Maduro and the Panamanian government of Ricardo Martinelli which strained Panama–Venezuela relations, which began after a series of protests by Venezuelan students and opposition leaders that began in February 2014. The crisis started on 5 March, when, during the celebrations for the first anniversary of the death of former president Hugo Chávez, Maduro publicly announced the breaking of diplomatic and commercial relations with Panama and accused Martinelli of being a "creeping lackey" of the United States.

The cutting off of diplomatic relations revealed a series of irregularities reported by the Panamanian government, including a multimillion-dollar debt from Venezuela to the Colón Free Trade Zone in Panama and the alleged interference by President Maduro in the 2014 Panamanian general election, by supporting the opposition Democratic Revolutionary Party. Meanwhile, Panama took action to give a voice to the Venezuelan opposition in the Organization of American States (OAS) and responded in harsh terms to the accusations of the Venezuelan government.

However, the crisis took a turn with the election of opposition leader Juan Carlos Varela as Panama's president-elect on 4 May, which prompted the Maduro government to commit to Panama in the normalization of relations. With the accusations between Martinelli and Maduro having ceased, and in turn Panama's support for Venezuelan opposition groups, the consulate in Panama was reopened a few days later, and President-elect Varela committed to the reestablishment of diplomatic and commercial relations, once he assumed power on 1 July, and ratified by the vice president of Venezuela, Jorge Arreaza, who visited the presidential inauguration and ended the crisis.

== Background ==
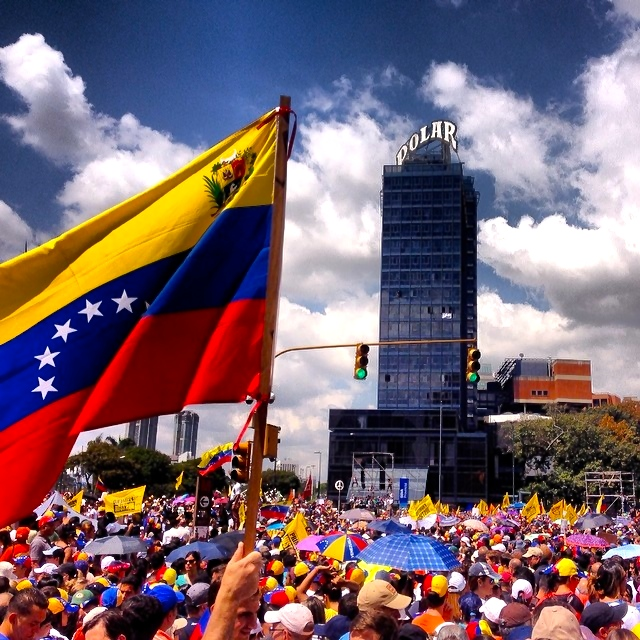
Venezuelan opposition march in the city of Caracas (12 February 2014).

The protests in Venezuela — also called by the opposition as 12F and La Salida— are a series of demonstrations against the socialist government of Venezuela headed by President of Venezuela Nicolás Maduro, which started on 12 February 2014, called by the leaders of the Venezuelan opposition María Corina Machado and Leopoldo López and organized in conjunction with student movements. They take place in several cities of the country, and among the motivations alleged by the opposition protesters are discontent over the alleged violation of civil rights (a "suspension of guarantees") the chronic shortage of basic products, high levels of criminal violence and the alleged interference of Cuba and Castroism in the politics of Venezuela. One of the main objectives of the protests within the student movement is the change of political and economic model and the resignation of President Nicolás Maduro and his cabinet.

Alongside the opposition demonstrations, the government also called for marches in its favour in Caracas and other cities. The Executive affirms that no guarantees have been suspended and that civil liberties are fully exercised in Venezuela. The Maduro government reportedly identifies protesters and opposition leaders who, according to them, promote violence and hatred as "fascists".

The demonstrations and riots left a total of 21 people dead (including government supporters, opponents, National Guard officials and others) and 261 injured, according to a report by the Attorney General's Office, while the Venezuelan Penal Forum (a human rights organization linked to the opposition) reports 33 alleged cases of torture. Acts of vandalism against public property have been reported during the demonstrations, which the Venezuelan government attributes to opponents, as well as the existence of armed motorized gangs or "collectives", supposedly formed by Chavismo sympathizers, who attacked opposition protesters and who have reportedly caused several deaths and assaults. On 21 February, the Venezuelan government withdrew the operating permit and signal within Venezuela from the international channelsNTN24 and CNN en Español, retracting its decision on 22 February with CNN, issuing new credentials for the journalists of the North American network. He was also accused of trying to block Twitter.

== Panama's first reactions to the protests ==
The Presidents

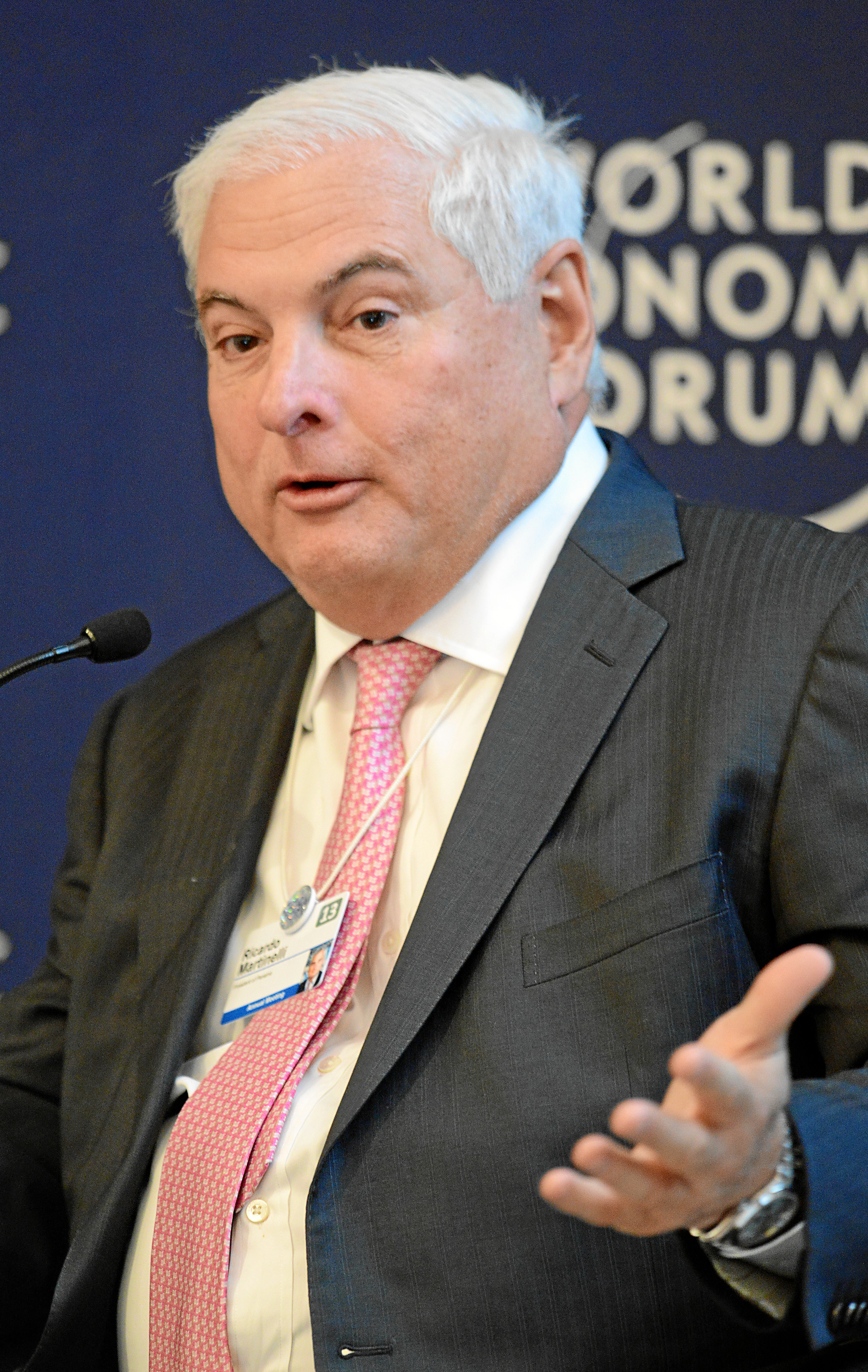
Ricardo Martinelli, president of Panama

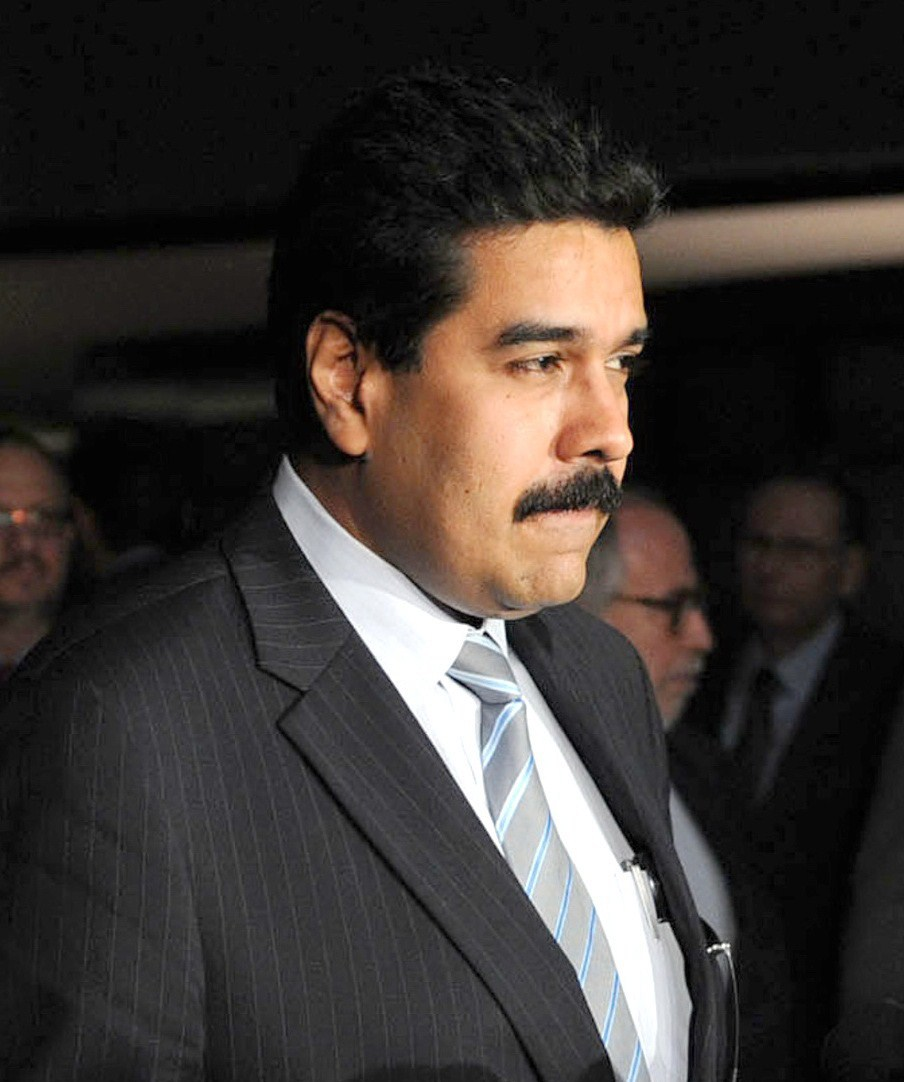
Nicolas Maduro, president of Venezuela

In the first days of the diplomatic dispute, the Panamanian foreign minister, Francisco Álvarez de Soto, stated that his government was "concerned about the Venezuelan situation and understands that it is an internal process but that Panama hopes for peace, tolerance and dialogue."

Panama's opinion on the protests in Venezuela generated an effect where both the Venezuelan and Panamanian governments called their ambassadors for consultations, and then the Venezuelan Foreign Minister Elías Jaua accused his Panamanian counterpart of "interference in internal affairs"; the matter escalated on 21 February when President Maduro himself accused President Martinelli of being part of the Latin American right, of acting on behalf of the United States Department of State and of dividing the region.

Martinelli responded to Maduro that he does not act under pressure from anyone and that he is not an enemy of the Venezuelan government, but that he calls for peace.

On 25 February, Martinelli requested a meeting of foreign ministers at the Organization of American States (OEA) to analyse the situation in Venezuela.

== Cutting of diplomatic ties ==
On March 5, President Maduro announced during the anniversary ceremony of the death of Hugo Chávez the breaking of diplomatic and commercial relations with Panama and accused President Martinelli of being a "lowly lackey." In response to these statements by Maduro, Martinelli wrote on his Twitter account that "the decision of the Government of Venezuela is surprising. Panama only yearns for this sister country to find peace and strengthen its democracy.

The Panamanian government issued an official statement calling the insults uttered by President Maduro "unacceptable" and saying that the foul language is inappropriate. The statement also indicates that the Venezuelan government's measures "should not constitute a smokescreen that seeks to deny its own reality."

In the same sense, the vice president of Panama, Juan Carlos Varela, pointed out that the measure of breaking relations is "absurd" and that Panama's duty is to call for dialogue and social peace.

In an interview with NTN24, President Martinelli proposed that the only way to establish a national dialogue in Venezuela would be the release of leader Leopoldo Leopoldo López, and declared that López's arrest was "a very big mistake." Similarly, the Panamanian government has published a statement that has been broadcast through the national media strongly reflecting the repudiation of President Maduro's statements, considering it an "attack" on Panama, the president and his government, while advocating for peace and freedom in Venezuela, echoing the military dictatorship that Panama suffered between 1968 and 1989.

== Venezuelan debt in the Colon Free Zone ==
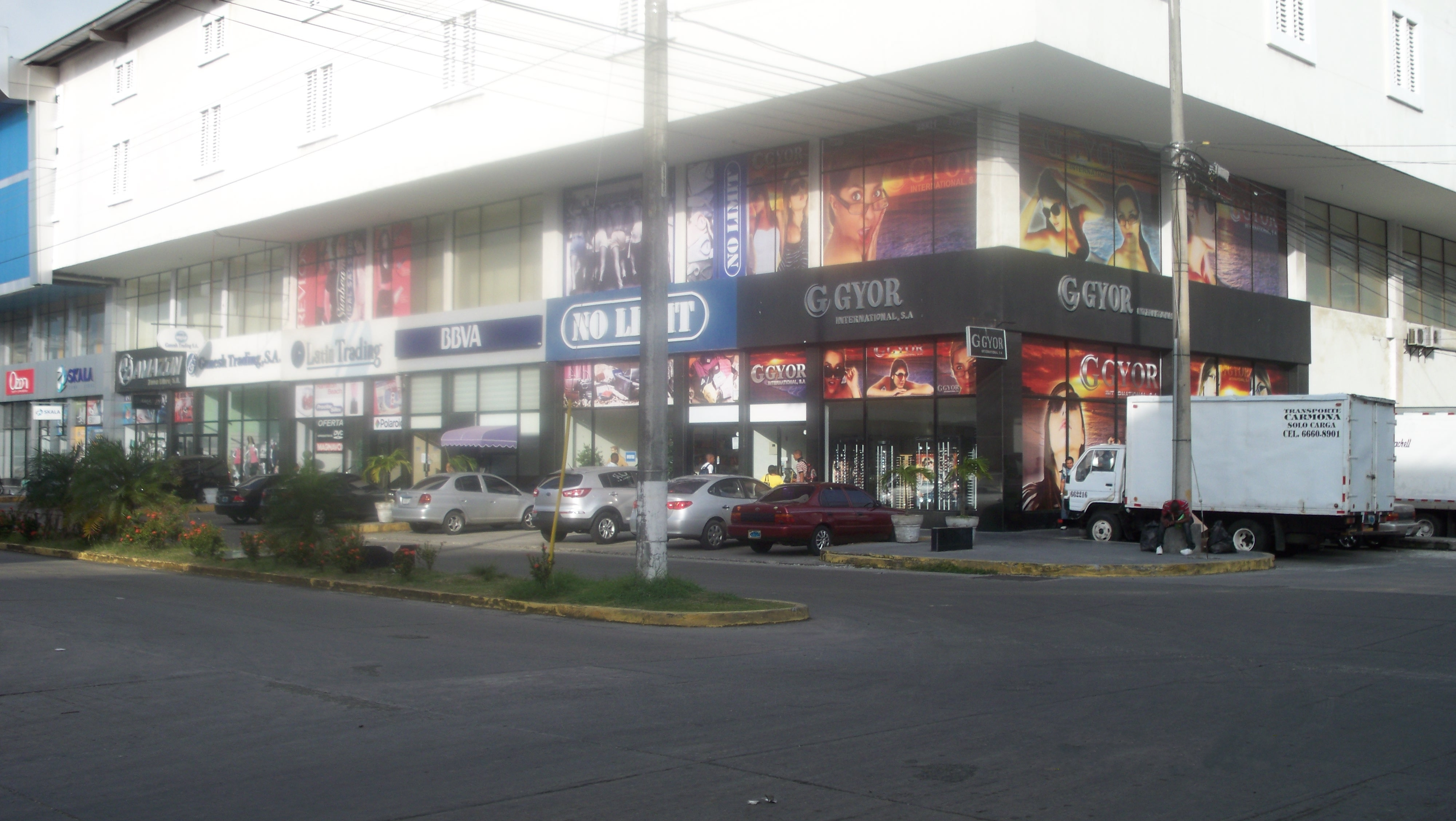
Businesses in the Colon Free Zone.

The breakdown of relations between Panama and Venezuela brought to light a background where Venezuela maintains a business debt of around 2 billion dollars with the Colón Free Trade Zone in Panama and that its review was suspended after the breakup. This debt has had the effect of reducing or suspending sales from the free zone, falling from 30% in 2012 to 10% of total sales currently.

However, Maduro stressed that President Martinelli himself was imposing " bribes" on Venezuelan businessmen, charging 20% of the invoices to finance the Panamanian electoral campaign; which the Panamanian government responded as accusations lacking truth and President Martinelli called Maduro "immature".

On 11 March, the general manager of the Colon Free Trade Zone accused Venezuelan businessmen in complicity with the government of inflating the debt of the free trade zone to the detriment of the Free Trade Zone and Panamanian exporters. He added that this irregularity was already known to the Venezuelan government since October 2013, and that the fraudulent debt amounts to 937 million dollars, of which he pointed to Cadivi, the Central Bank of Venezuela and Seniat as the government components behind the action, responding that Maduro's accusations against the debt with Panama are a "lie".

On 19 March, Panama's Minister of Commerce, Ricardo Qujano, submitted to the World Trade Organization (WTO) protest notes against what he called "discriminatory measures" by Venezuela and which therefore violate international agreements, since Panama has not received any written note from the Venezuelan government regarding the breaking of trade relations. Panamanian foreign minister, Álvarez de Soto, stated that Panama will defend its commercial interests before international bodies.

On April 3, at the World Economic Forum on Latin America, Martinelli harshly questioned the Venezuelan economic system, stating that it was unthinkable that a country like Venezuela "has such a huge administrative mess and that the resources of the Venezuelan people have been squandered, stolen, (that) there is not even toilet paper...". Despite the break in trade, Panama ruled out any retaliatory measures against Venezuela, and announced that they would abstain from economic measures and that they would wait for the next government to be elected on 4 May to be the one in charge of it, according to the Panamanian Minister of the Presidency, Roberto Henríquez.

== Panama requests OAS to address protests in Venezuela ==
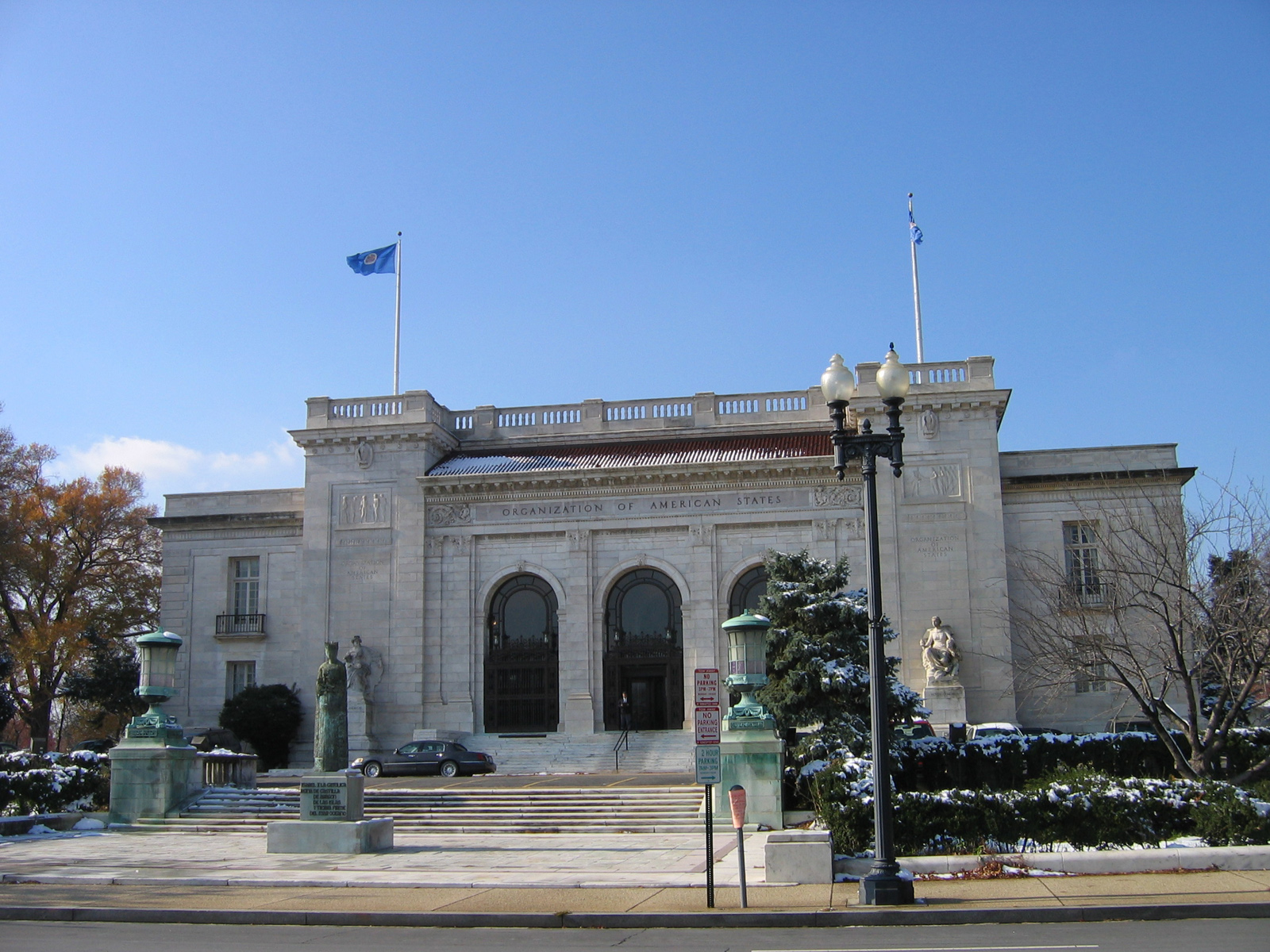
Headquarters of the Organization of American States (OAS) in Washington D.C.

The Permanent Council of the Organization of American States (OAS) met in a closed-door session for two days on March 6 and 7 on the situation in Venezuela at the request of Panama, resulting in a large majority in continuing the process of national dialogue proposed by the Venezuelan government and ruling out a meeting between foreign ministers (proposed by Panama) and making periodic reports to the Permanent Council on the situation in Venezuela (proposed by Peru). In the final declaration, approved by 29 countries and rejected by Canada, the United States and Panama, it expresses condolences for the victims of the protests, calls for progress in investigations, calls for the rejection of violence and for respect for human rights; and also calls for "respect for the principle of non-intervention in the internal affairs of States."

=== Efforts to support the Venezuelan opposition ===
On 10 March, the Panamanian ambassador to the OAS, Arturo Vallarino, proposed inviting Venezuelan opposition leaders to the Permanent Council session, such as legislators María Corina Machado, Henrique Capriles, Antonio Ledezma, unions and student leaders, as a way of learning about the situation in Venezuela. The Panamanian ambassador stated that this measure has the approval of President Martinelli and that they are aware of the cost that this action would entail.

On 13 March, President Martinelli announced that he would receive Congresswoman María Corina Machado at the presidential palace in Panama City, to make Panama's request that opposition leaders be heard at the OAS, which has generated reactions from the president of the Venezuelan National Assembly, Diosdado Caballero, accusing Martinelli of being a "lackey" of the United States.

Later, the Panamanian ambassador to the OAS, Arturo Vallarino, declared that he would cede the Panamanian chair to Deputy Corina Machado and a delegation of students and opposition trade unionists at the next regular meeting of the OAS on 21 March, and that Panama would insist on the defence of human rights in Venezuela. However, during the regular meeting where the situation in Venezuela was to be discussed, it was first decided to hold a closed-door session and then the session was cancelled with the approval of the majority of the countries, leaving Maria Corina Machado unable to speak at the event.

The president of the National Assembly of Venezuela Diosdado Cabello argued that Corina Machado had "self-stripped" herself of the investiture of a deputy by accepting the "alternate representation" of Panama at the OAS meeting, a fact that was ratified by the National Assembly and the Supreme Court of Justice of Venezuela on April 1. Martinelli responded harshly to the dismissal, accusing Maduro of not respecting "democratic and civil liberties" and said that the situation in Venezuela is "chaotic and catastrophic".

== Accusations of interference in Panamanian elections ==
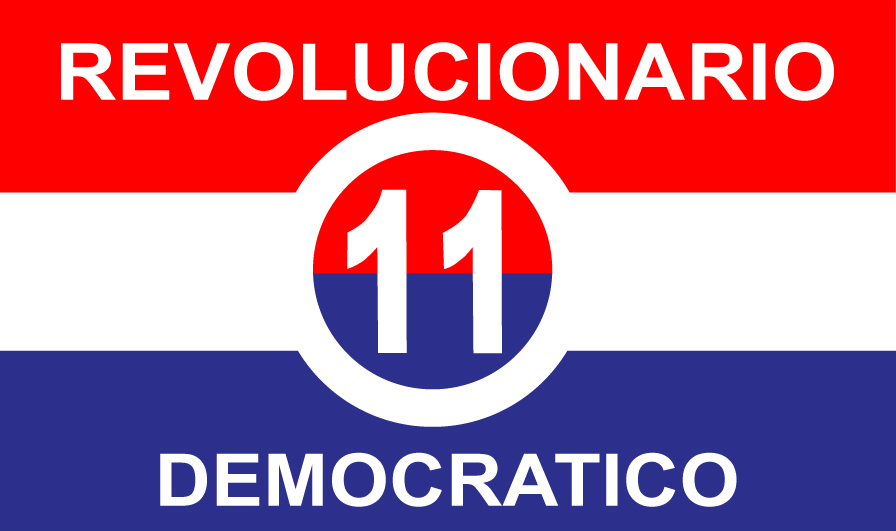
Flag of the Democratic Revolutionary Party. The Panamanian government has accused Maduro of favoring the opposition party in the 2014 Panamanian general election.

In parallel to the breaking of diplomatic relations, President Nicolás Maduro repeatedly mentioned the figure of the deceased Panamanian military man Omar Torrijos Herrera, naming a popular building in western Caracas after the military man, a day after the breaking of relations; calling Torrijos a "Bolivarian general". Later, on 15 March, by orders of Maduro, units of the National Armed Forces would be instructed with the "thought" of Omar Torrijos and he reiterated his praise for the Panamanian military man.

These actions provoked a harsh reaction from the Panamanian government on 16 March, who accused Maduro of interfering in the Panamanian electoral process of 4 May 2014, where the opposition Democratic Revolutionary Party (PRD), founded by Omar Torrijos, ran for president for the ruling Democratic Change of President Martinelli. In an official statement, the Panamanian government accused Maduro of having preferences for the PRD for the praise of Torrijos and demanded not to interfere in the local electoral process, emphasizing foreign governments that finance Panama's opposition parties to "get their hairy hands off".

On 18 March, the Presidency of Panama issued a statement in which President Martinelli accused Maduro of directly financing the campaign of PRD presidential candidate Juan Carlos Navarro, pointing to the Venezuelan president's wishes that the next elected government of Panama be "Torrijista" as proof. Martinelli added that "Maduro should be solving the problems of shortages in his country and not putting his hands in Panama".

== Protests by Venezuelans living in Panama ==
The Venezuelan community in Panama, according to official figures, is around 12 thousand people in 2012, have demonstrated in favour of President Martinelli and against Maduro, with calls in parks in the Panamanian capital and other cities in the interior. A protest was also called in front of the Cuban embassy in Panama, denouncing possible interference by the Caribbean island in Venezuela.

Among other measures, the Venezuelan community sent a letter with more than 1,800 signatures on March 7 in support of President Martinelli and the Panamanian government, emphasizing that their action was "in accordance with the law" and that President Maduro "attacked" Martinelli and the Panamanian people "in a disproportionate and rude manner".

== Normalisation of relations ==
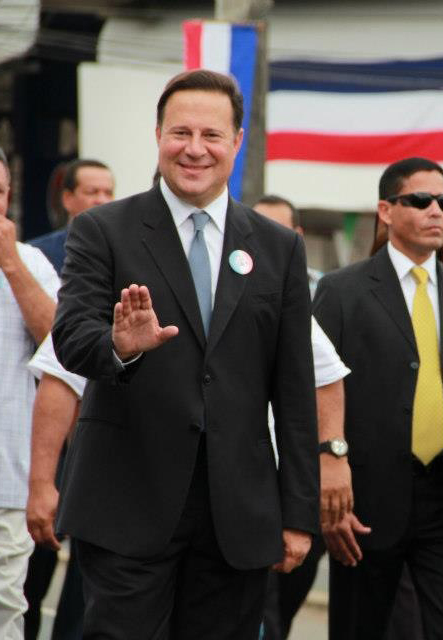
Juan Carlos Varela, president of Panama after July 2014. Varela's election as president marked a turning point and normalization in relations with Venezuela.

The first signs of easing the crisis were made by Nicolás Maduro on the night of 4 May, after the presidential elections in Panama had ended, where the vice president and opposition candidate Juan Carlos Varela, of the Panameñista Party, was chosen as president-elect, defeating the government candidate José Domingo Arias. According to the Venezuelan Foreign Ministry, Maduro called Varela by phone to congratulate him on the victory, and indicated that both would commit to accelerating the normalization and relaunching of diplomatic and commercial relations between Panama and Venezuela.

On 19 May, the exchange of diplomatic notes and the reestablishment of relations at the consular level were announced, confirmed by Panamanian foreign minister Francisco Álvarez de Soto, and that the action to relaunch relations was proposed by the Venezuelan government. On 27 May, the Venezuelan consulate in Panama was reopened and the process of issuing passports was restarted.

President-elect Varela declared on 5 June that once he took office on 1 July, diplomatic and commercial relations with Venezuela would be reestablished, following an agreement reached by a delegation headed by Vice Foreign Minister-designate Luis Miguel Hincapié, who also extended an invitation to Nicolás Maduro for the presidential inauguration.

The crisis formally ended with the presidential inauguration of Juan Carlos Varela on 1 July, with the presence of a Venezuelan delegation headed by Vice President Jorge Arreaza, who publicly announced on behalf of Nicolás Maduro the restoration of diplomatic and commercial relations with Panama.

== International reactions ==
=== International Organisations ===
- Parlatino: The Latin American Parliament declared on 12 March 2014 that it would offer to mediate to re-establish diplomatic relations between Panama and Venezuela, and that according to the president of Parlatino, Venezuela had accepted this gesture.

=== National governments ===
- Bolivia: President Evo Morales supported the Venezuelan decision to break relations with Panama, justifying that both Panama and the United States were committing foreign interference in Venezuela and financing small groups.
- Costa Rica: Out of "solidarity" with the Panamanian government, Costa Rica assumed responsibility for the consular procedures of Panamanians in Venezuela during the rupture of relations. The acting foreign minister, Gioconda Ubeda, declared that Costa Rica is the custodian of Panama's consular archives and properties in Venezuela.
- Cuba: Cuban Foreign Minister Bruno Rodríguez Parrilla expressed his full support for the Venezuelan government in the dispute.
- Guatemala: President Otto Pérez Molina regretted the breakdown of relations and urged both countries to prioritize dialogue, seek agreements and resume relations.

== See also ==
- 2018 Panama–Venezuela diplomatic crisis
