= 2018 Panama–Venezuela diplomatic crisis =

Stand-off after anti-Venezuela sanctions

- Part of Crisis in Venezuela
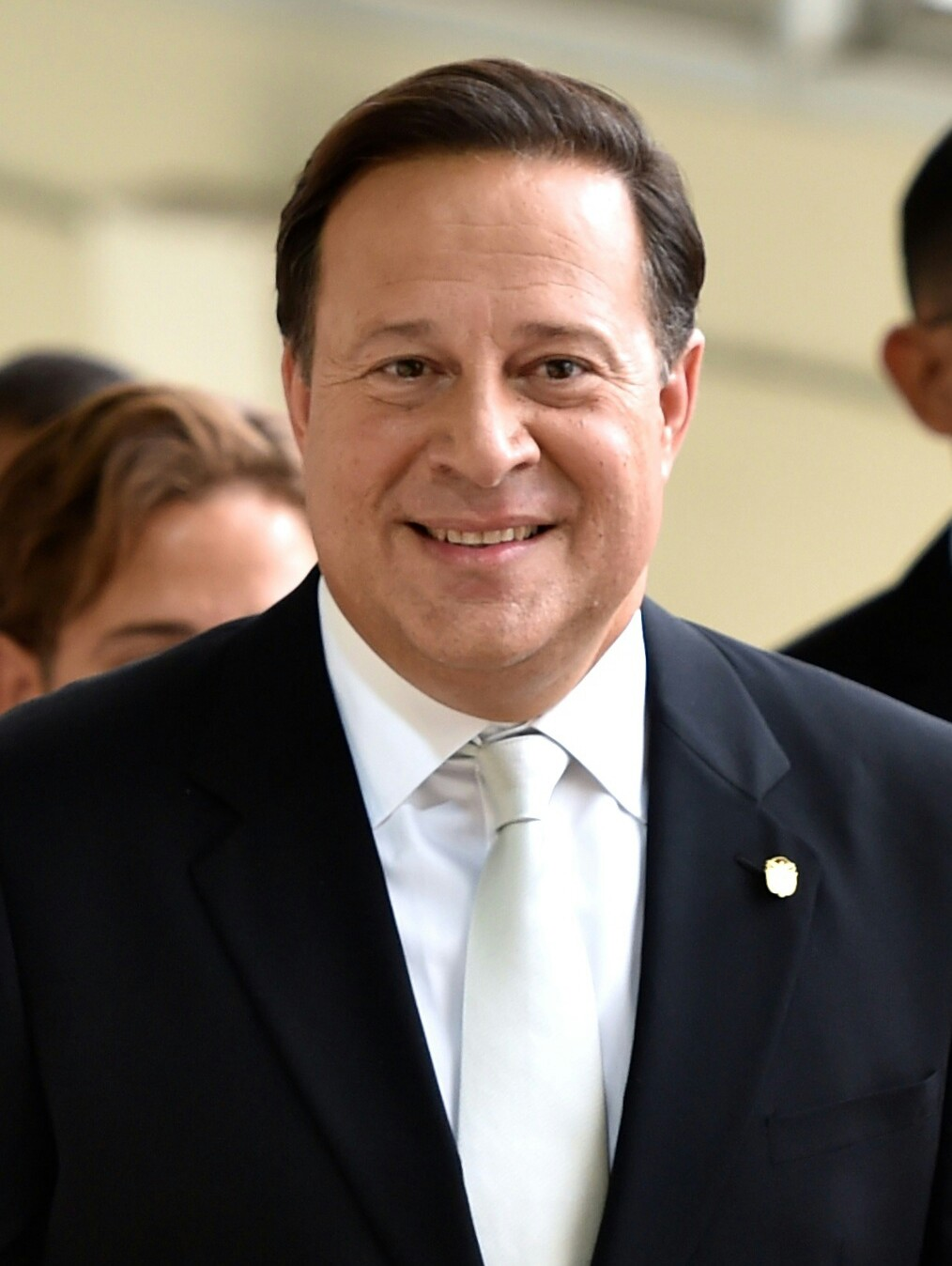
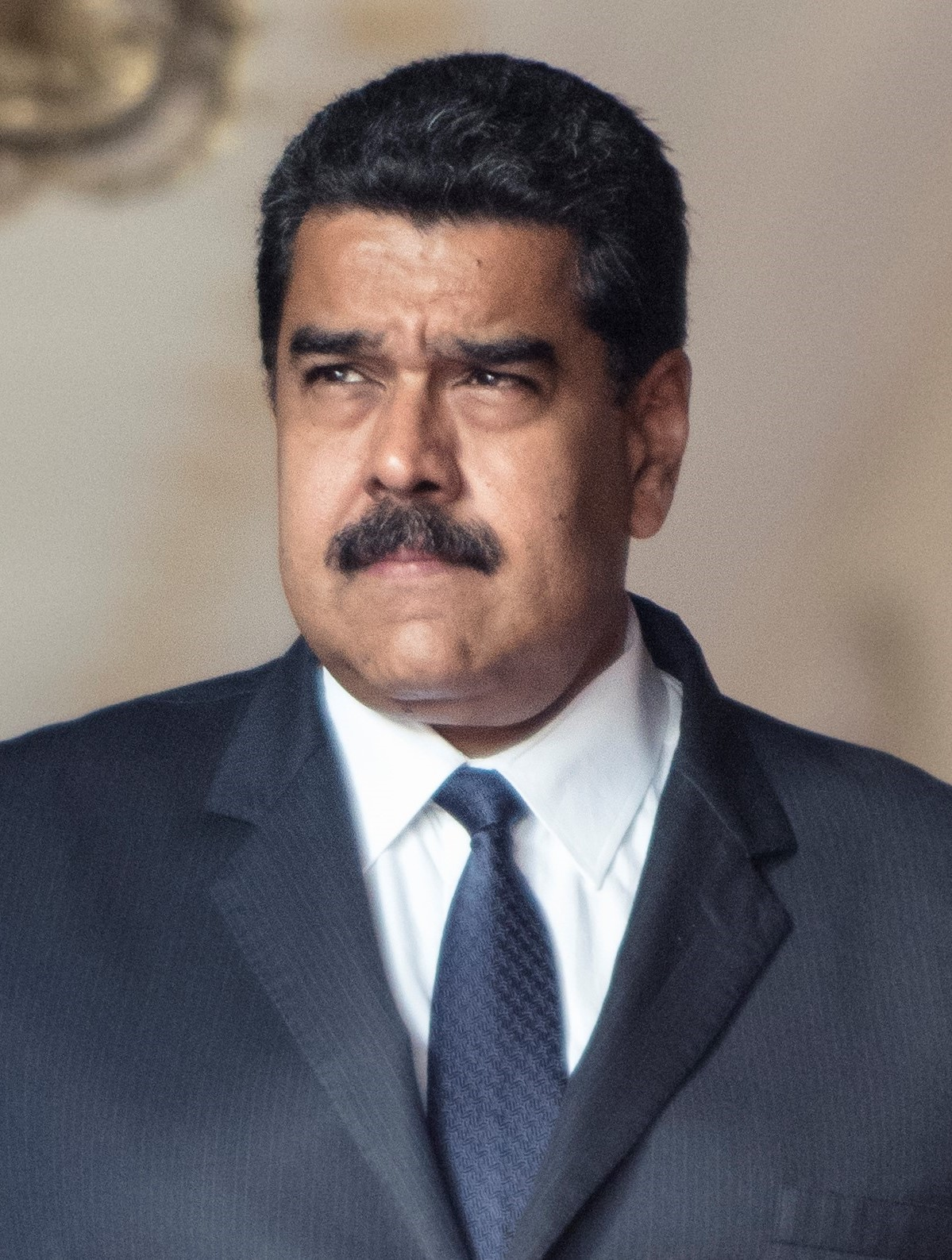
- Panamanian president Juan Carlos Varela (left) and Venezuelan president Nicolás Maduro (right)
- Date: 29 March 2018 – 26 April 2018
- Caused by: Sanctions imposed by the Panamanian government against President Nicolás Maduro and key government officials.
- Result: Relations restored following mediation by the Dominican Republic

Parties
Panama	Venezuela

Lead figures
Juan Carlos Varela (President of Panama) Diplomatic support: Lima Group; United States	Nicolás Maduro (President of Venezuela)

The 2018 Panama–Venezuela diplomatic crisis was a diplomatic stand-off between Panama and Venezuela after the Panamanian government imposed sanctions on President Nicolás Maduro and several key officials of the Bolivarian government over alleged involvement with "money laundering, financing of terrorism and financing the proliferation of weapons of mass destruction" on 29 March 2018.

On 5 April 2018, Maduro imposed sanctions on Panamanian companies and as well as prominent Panamanian officials, including President Juan Carlos Varela in response to the sanctions imposed by Panama.

The diplomatic crisis ended on 26 April 2018 when President Maduro announced that he had called President Varela and agreed to the return of the ambassadors and the return of air communication between both countries.

== Background ==
Bilateral relations between the Panama and Venezuela have been suspended on two previous occasions under the Bolivarian government. In 2004, diplomatic relations were suspended by Venezuelan President Hugo Chávez (together with Cuba), when the Panamanian government refused to extradite a Cuban exile militant and CIA agent Luis Posada Carriles, claiming his life was in danger if extradited to those countries.

In March 2014, Venezuelan President Nicolás Maduro broke off diplomatic relations between the two countries, after President Ricardo Martinelli expressed support for the demonstrators during the 2014 Venezuelan protests. Relations were later restored in July 2014, after Vice President Jorge Arreaza attended the inauguration of President Juan Carlos Varela.

== Start of the crisis ==
On March 29, 2018, the Ministry of Economy and Finance in Panama published a list of Venezuelan people, for their history of banking operations, were subject to investigations by cash or bank fraud laundering, so the list sought to warn both public and private institutions that limit their economic and financial operations with the listed group, considering them to be "high risk". The Panamanian government accuses these officials for alleged involvement with "money laundering, financing of terrorism and financing the proliferation of weapons of mass destruction."

The list contained high-profile officials of the Bolivarian government including president Nicolás Maduro, 2017 Constituent National Assembly President Delcy Rodríguez, Vice President of the United Socialist Party of Venezuela (PSUV) Diosdado Cabello, Head of Local Committees for Supply and Production (CLAP) Freddy Bernal, ANC member and brother of former President Hugo Chávez Adán Chávez, Prisons Minister Iris Varela, President of the TSJ Maikel Moreno, Attorney General of Venezuela Tarek William Saab, President of the pro-government CNE Tibisay Lucena, Minister of Interior Néstor Reverol and Head of SEBIN Gustavo González López.

A group of Venezuelan opposition deputies, Freddy Superlano, Luis Florido and Ismael García traveled to Panama on April 3 to request the Panamanian Vice President and Foreign Minister, Isabel Saint Malo, the detailed list of the 55 Venezuelan officials. included in the list and the express reasons. In response, the foreign minister promised to provide all possible information in the way of cooperation between both countries, always respecting the applicable law.

=== Venezuelan government reaction ===
On 5 April 2018, the Venezuelan government imposed sanctions on 22 people and 46 Panamanian companies, among which were key officials of the government, including the President and Foreign Minister or Panama-based companies operating in Venezuela, such as Copa Airlines.

=== Panamanian government reaction ===
On 6 April 2018, the Panamanian government ordered to recall its ambassador to Venezuela, Miguel Octavio Mejia Miranda, in Caracas and urged the Venezuelan government to do the same with the Venezuelan ambassador, Jorge Luis Durán Centeno, in Panama City.

Copa Airlines was forced to suspend its operations from Caracas, Maracaibo and Valencia in response to the sanctions but resumed on 1 May 2018.

According to President Varela, the sanctions imposed against Copa Airlines by the Maduro government will hurt Venezuelans since Panama is a logistic route for supplying medicine and food in response to the outgoing shortages.

== Sanctions between both countries ==
=== Sanctions on Panama by Venezuela ===
Venezuela imposed commercial sanctions by breaking commercial relations with Panama to 22 personalities and 46 Panamanian companies in response to the sanctions that Panama had imposed on Venezuela while reporting on the future publication of the list of Venezuelan personalities susceptible to money laundering.

Venezuelan Vice President Tareck el Aissami announced that President Maduro has suspended commercial relations with several Panamanian companies, which will be added to the list of 46 announced originally on April 5. The measure became effective on April 13, 2018, adding 50 more companies.

=== Sanctions on Venezuela by Panama ===
Panamanian president Juan Carlos Varela indicated that his government would not recognize the 2018 Venezuelan presidential election results to persist the bilateral conflict. In addition, it is reported that his executive is preparing new sanctions in response to the "aggressive and disproportionate" measures that Venezuela done before the imposition of sanctions by Panama.

The Government of Panama approved retaliation measures against the Venezuelan government, based on the Panamanian retaliation law and by virtue of the principle of reciprocity that governs international relations. The Cabinet Council ordered the suspension, for a period of ninety (90) days extendable, of all activities of air transport, passengers and cargo of Venezuelan airlines operating in Panama, the companies are as follows:

- Aeropostal Alas De Venezuela, S.A.
- Avior Airlines
- Consorcio Venezolano De Industrias Aeronáuticas y Servicios Aéreos, S.A. (Conviasa)
- Línea Aérea De Servicio Ejecutivo, Regional (LASER)
- Rutas Aéreas De Venezuela, S.A. (Ravsa)
- Santa Bárbara Airlines
- Turpial Airlines, C.A.

The measures took effect from April 25, 2018. In addition, the government approved an extension of 60 days tourist visa for Venezuelans stranded in Panama.

== Reactions ==
On March 28, 2018, the government of Switzerland imposed economic sanctions on Venezuela and froze the accounts of several senior government officials.

The Lima Group quickly positioned itself on the Panamanian side, condemned the Venezuelan sanctions imposed against Panama and assessed the possibilities of imposing additional international sanctions on the Maduro government, while at the same time recalling its non-recognition of the 2017 Venezuelan Constituent Assembly election and the repudiation of the upcoming presidential elections in Venezuela scheduled for May 20.

The United States has welcomed the measures taken by Panama to expose and block Venezuelan money laundering and urged the international community "to follow Panama’s example and stand together against the Maduro regime’s corruption and illegitimate rule.” It also reiterated that Venezuela must restore democracy and end the repression and suffering of the Venezuelan people.

== Mediation by Dominican Republic ==
At the request of President Maduro, the President of the Dominican Republic, Danilo Medina, was asked to act as mediator in a meeting in order to resolve the conflict with Panama.

The meeting was held on April 11 in a secret manner by both sides, between Venezuelan Minister Wilmar Castro Soteldo and Panamanian Vice President Isabel Saint Malo, mediated by Dominican Foreign Minister Manuel Vargas.

However, the talks collapsed on April 18, President Maduro himself revealed the existence of this meeting and blamed the head of the Panamanian delegation for "insults". Subsequently, the Panamanian government confirmed the meeting and argued that the commercial list published by Panama only formalizes lists published by the international community.

== End of the crisis ==
On April 26, President Maduro announced that he made a phone call with President Varela and agreed to the return of the ambassadors of both countries, including the restitution of air communication between both countries, which was being affected from day. Likewise, an open diplomatic channel was left to discuss other pending issues, with a progress report that will be made in the next 30 days. The agreement was confirmed by the Panamanian Foreign Ministry.

== See also ==
- International sanctions during the Venezuelan crisis
- 2014 Panama–Venezuela diplomatic crisis
- 2019–20 Mexico–Bolivia diplomatic crisis
