= 2025–2026 Spain–United States diplomatic crisis =

International diplomatic dispute

- Part of Spain–United States relations
- Date: 2025–2026
- Location: Spain and United States

Parties
Spain	United States

Lead figures
Pedro Sánchez (Prime Minister of Spain)	Donald Trump (President of the United States)

In 2025, relations between Spain and the United States entered a state of crisis. The 2025–2026 Spain–United States diplomatic crisis was a severe deterioration in bilateral relations between Spain and the United States during the second presidency of Donald Trump. The dispute centred on Spain's refusal to meet U.S. demands on NATO defence spending and to allow the use of Spanish military bases and airspace for U.S. operations in the 2026 war against Iran. In response, the Trump administration threatened and later ordered a halt to trade with Spain, while Madrid closed its airspace to U.S. aircraft involved in the conflict and rejected U.S. pressure over base access. The episode was described by analysts as the worst crisis in Spain–U.S. relations in decades and raised questions about NATO cohesion and EU–US ties.

== Crisis ==
=== Refusal to increase defense spending ===
Prior to 2025, Spain was the lowest-spending country in defense in NATO with military expenditures amounting to only 1.3% of its GDP. In April, Sanchez said that he would increase military spending by 10 million euros in order to meet the 2% minimum threshold. In June 2025, Spanish prime minister Pedro Sánchez refused to increase military spending to 5% of the country's GDP after all other countries of the alliance had pledged to do so during the summit in The Hague, with Sanchez calling it "not only unreasonable but also counterproductive". As a response, on 25 June, the US president Donald Trump said that he had the intention of severing commercial ties with Spain and doubled tariffs on Spain-imported goods.

=== Iran war ===
On 2 March 2026, amid the expanding war between the United States, Israel and Iran, the Spanish government refused a U.S. request to use jointly operated military bases at Rota and Morón for operations against Iran. Prime Minister Pedro Sánchez condemned what he described as U.S. and Israeli “unilateral military action,” stating that Spanish bases would not be used without a United Nations mandate or clear legal basis. A day later, U.S. President Donald Trump responded by announcing that the United States would cut off all trade with Spain, citing the base dispute and Spain's defence spending stance. The Spanish government pushed back firmly, insisting that any review of trade relations must respect international law and the EU-U.S. bilateral agreements that govern commerce. On 4 March, the White House claimed that Spain had agreed to cooperate with the U.S. military, but Spanish officials denied that and said their position had not changed. On 30 March, the Spanish government closed the country's airspace to U.S. planes involved in attacks on Iran. Spanish defense minister Margarita Robles stated that Spain had not authorized the United States to use its military airbases, nor its airspace, for operations related to the war in Iran.

During the 2026 conflict between the United States, Israel, and Iran, Spanish Prime Minister Pedro Sánchez condemned the military actions of the United States. He announced that Spain would not support the use of its military bases or airspace for attacks on Iran and stated that continued hostilities could destabilize the Middle East and endanger civilians. Sánchez described the escalation as a serious mistake and called for diplomatic solutions and adherence to international law.

In April 2026, a leaked Pentagon email revealed that the United States was considering suspending Spain from NATO over its refusal to grant access to military bases on Spanish territory for strikes against Iran. Experts noted that the US cannot unilaterally suspend a NATO member, but the incident highlighted deepening tensions between the two allies. Moreover, a senior figure at the American Foreign Policy Council labeled Spain, rather than Turkey, as NATO's "weakest link" due to its government's anti-American rhetoric, refusal to meet defense spending targets, and growing strategic alignment with China. In July 2026, tensions further escalated when U.S. President Donald Trump ordered a halt to economic ties and visits with Spain during the 2026 NATO summit over its defense spending commitments, describing Spain as a "terrible partner." Spanish Prime Minister Pedro Sánchez sought to ease tensions, saying that he had held a "very cordial" conversation with Trump during the summit.

=== Ceuta crisis ===
In April 2026, United States House Committee on Appropriations member Mario Díaz-Balart added text to a report stating that the Spanish cities of Ceuta and Melilla, both claimed by Morocco, are "located in Moroccan territory". This report became attached to bill H.R. 8595, which was passed by the house on 15 July by 217 to 209, with all but one member of the Republican Party voting for it. On 6 August 2026, during the 2026 Ceuta migrant crisis, US State Department spokesman Tommy Pigott stated that his country "unequivocally supports Spain's sovereignty over Ceuta and Melilla", and that the congressional report was not part of US law. Pigott blamed the crisis on "the Spanish government's refusal to defend their sovereignty, secure their borders, and protect their people". In September 2026, Trump criticized Sanchez over not having been able to defend Spain's border amid the Ceuta crisis.

=== Trade ===
In 2025, 4.9% of Spanish goods were exported to the United States, with a worth of approximately €18 billion. Conversely, Spain imports €23 billion in American goods. Trump's effective power to sanction Spain is limited by the Section 122 of the Trade Act. Over the Iran war diplomatic litigation in March, Trump threatened with stopping all trade with Spain but did not. On 8 July 2026, Trump ordered to halt all trade with Spain despite the European Union regulations on trade requiring negotiations with the entire bloc.

=== Gaza genocide ===
Sanchez has repeatedly criticized Trump and Israel prime minister Benjamin Netanyahu over the Gaza genocide, calling the act a genocide. In February 2025, Trump suggested taking over Gaza and relocating the population to other Muslim-majority countries such as Egypt and Jordan. Sanchez explicitly deemed it immoral and destabilizing.
