= Panama–Venezuela relations =

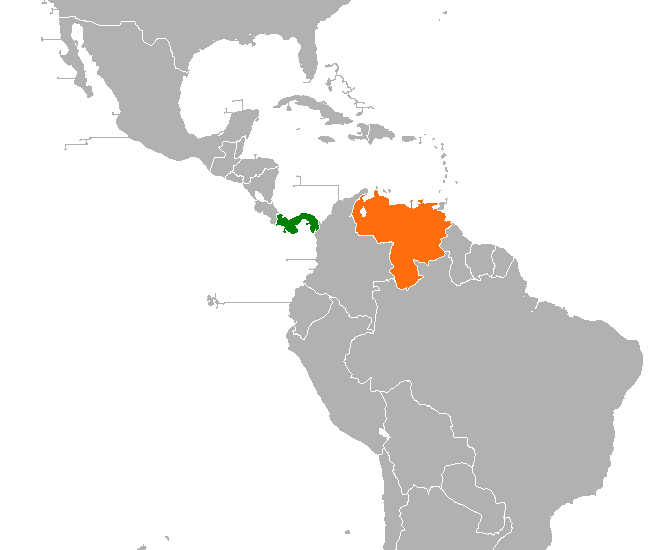
- Panama: Venezuela

Diplomatic relations between Panama and Venezuela have intensified in the 21st century.

== History ==
=== 2010s ===
In 2014, the relationship between Nicolás Maduro and Ricardo Martinelli broke down.

In 2018, a diplomatic crisis erupted between the countries. Diplomatic ties were cut.

=== 2020s ===
In 2024, Panama suspended their diplomatic relations with Venezuela and withdrew its diplomatic personnel from the country until a full review of the presidential election results is concluded. Ambassadors were withdrawn. In October 2025, Venezuela re-opened its embassy in Panama City.
