= Lackey (manservant) =

Uniformed manservant

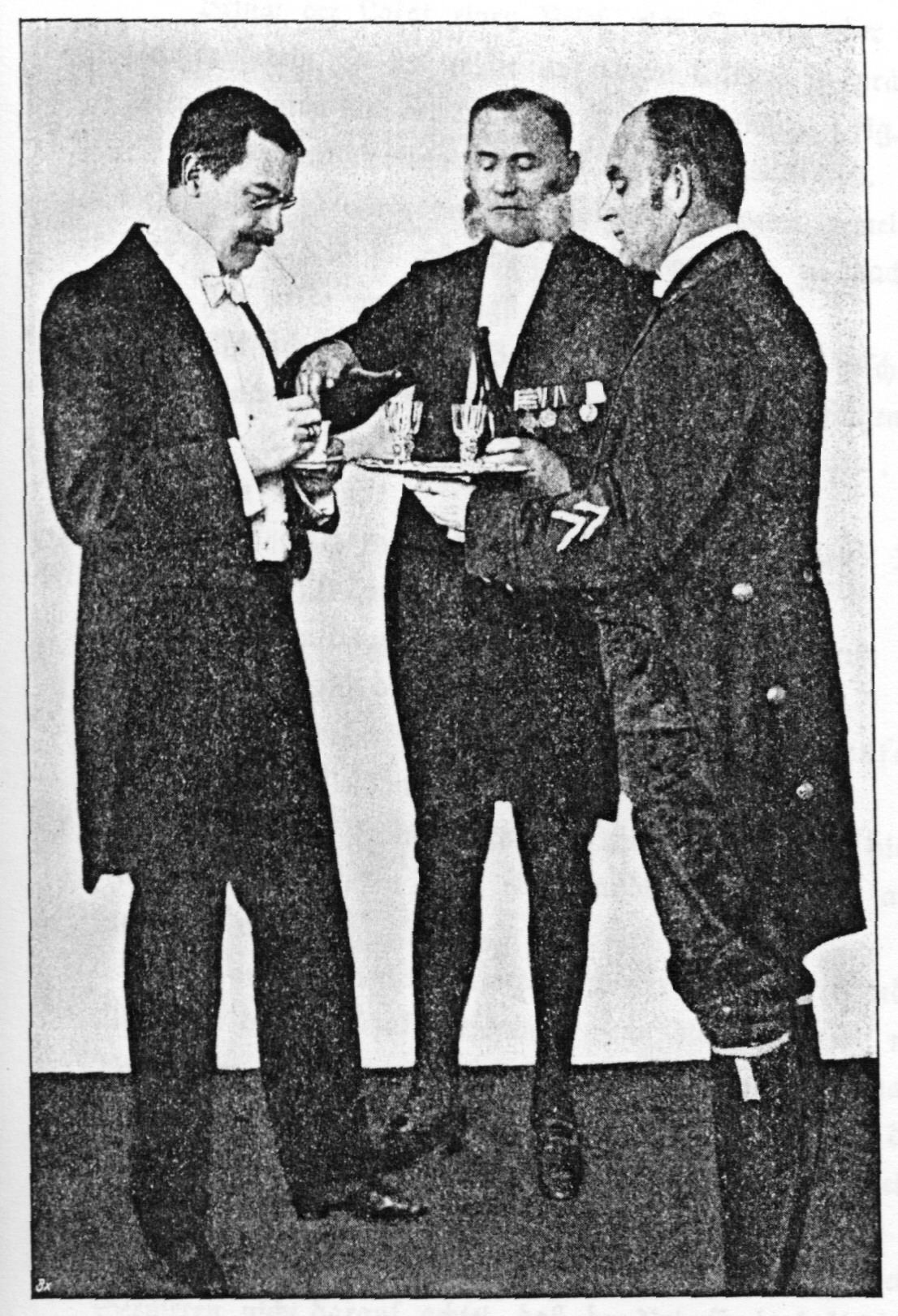
Valet (center) and lackey (right) serve wine. Illustration from H. Reuß zu Köstritz: Der korrekte Diener, Paul Parey Verlag, Berlin 1900; p. 21

A lackey or lacquey, in its original definition (attested 1529, according to the Oxford English Dictionary), is a uniformed manservant.

The modern connotation of "servile follower" appeared later, in 1588 (OED).

== Etymology ==
There are several theories about the origins of the word. By one theory, it is derived from Medieval French laquais, "foot soldier, footman, servant", ultimately from Turkish ulak, literally "a messenger". The word also exists in German, where Lakai denotes a liveried manservant in the services of a monarch or prince.

== Usage in popular culture ==
Lackey is typically used as a derogatory term for a servant with little or no self-respect who belittles himself in order to gain an advantage. Such advantage is often assumed to be slight, temporary and often illusory.

== See also ==
- Sycophancy
