= Colón Free Trade Zone =

Largest free port in the Americas

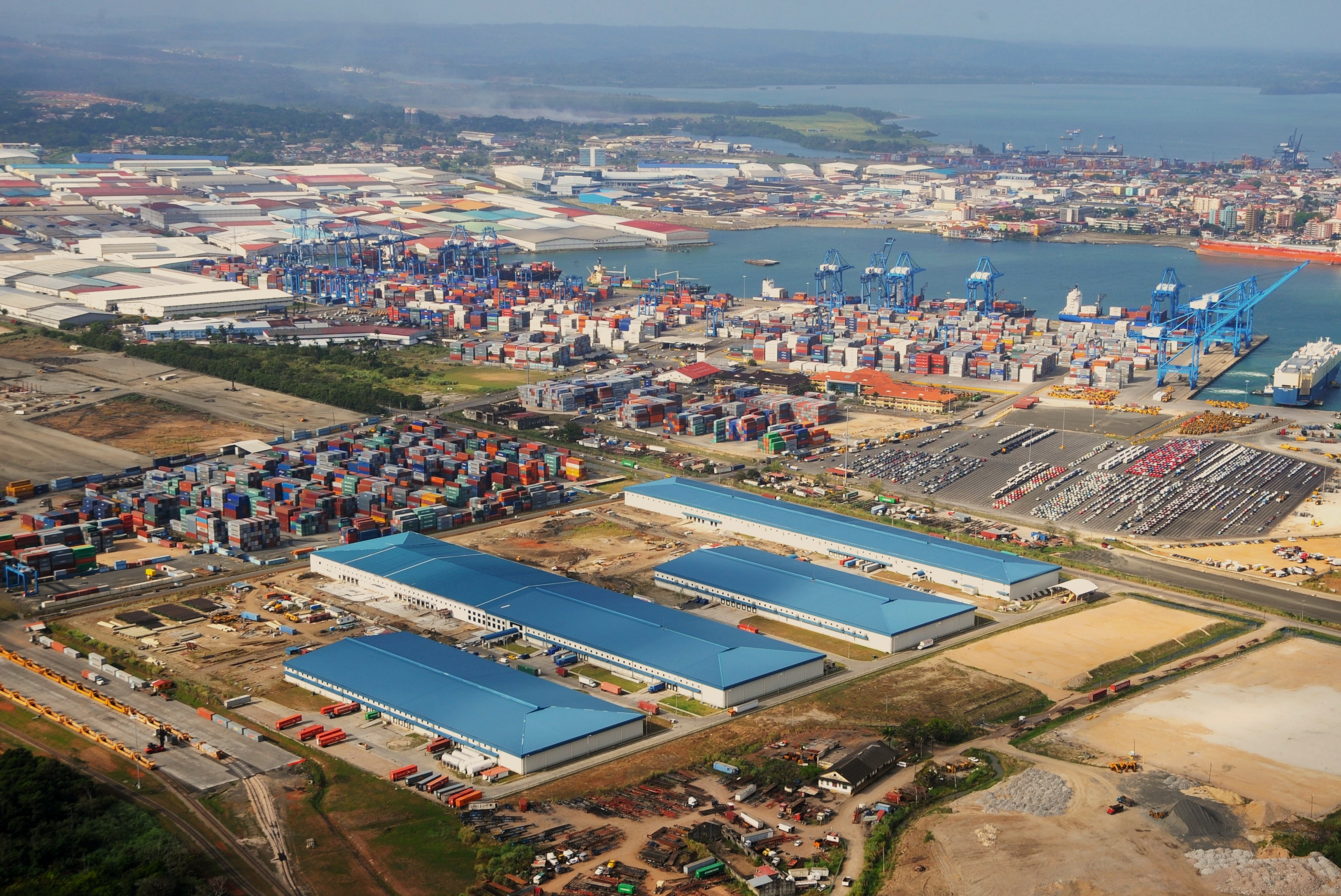
- Aerial view of the Colon Free Trade Zone
- Founded: 1948
- Founder: Administration of President Enrique A. Jiménez
- Type: Autonomous entity, Free zone
- Headquarters: Colon, Panama
- Owner: Government of Panama
- Leader: Luisa Napolitano
- Revenue: ▲USD 19.713 billion (2017)
- Website: www.zolicol.gob.pa

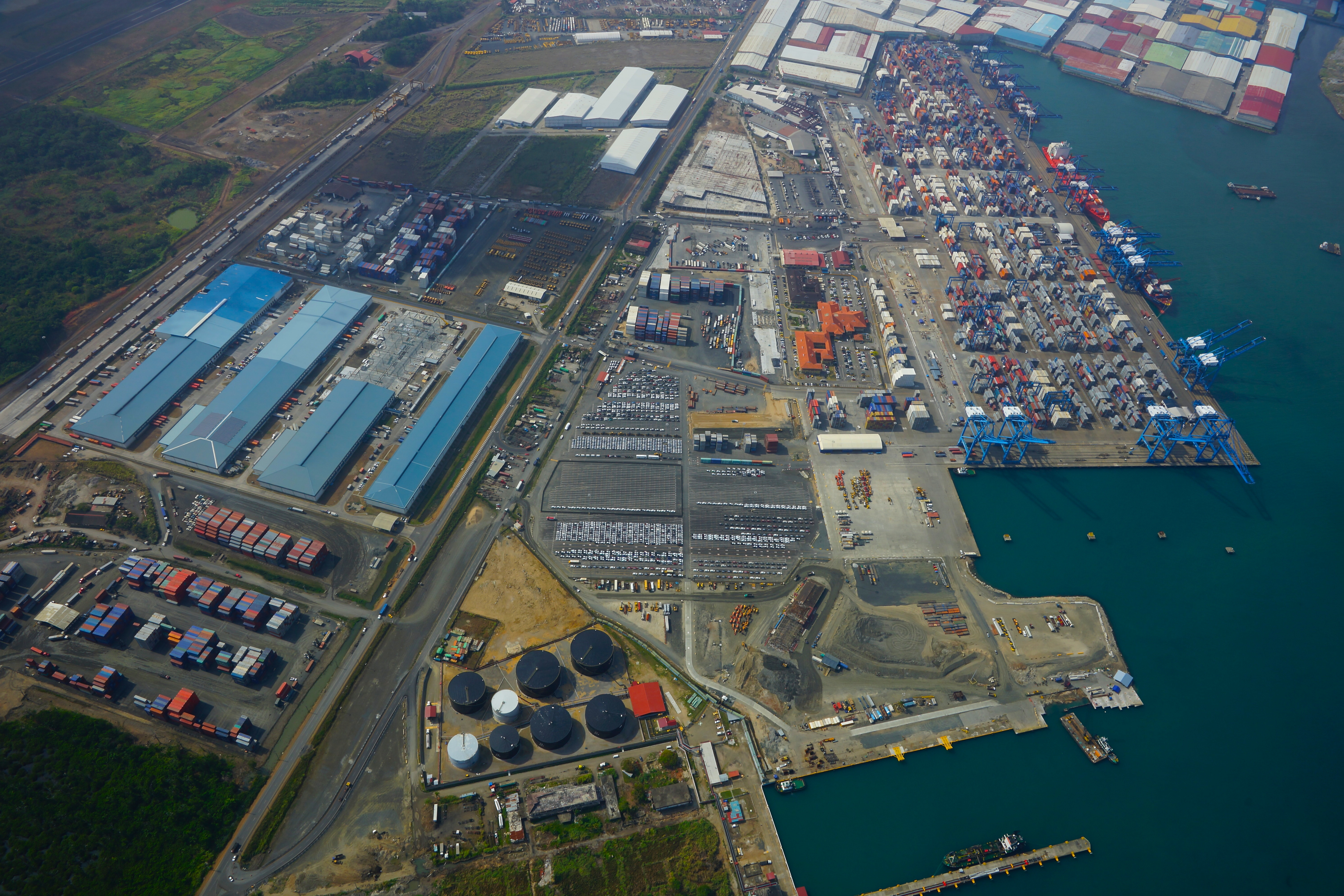
Aerial view of the Colón Free Trade Zone

The Colón Free Trade Zone is a free port in Panama dedicated to re-exporting a wide variety of merchandise to Latin America and the Caribbean. It is located on the Caribbean coast, near the Atlantic entrance to the Panama Canal, in the province of Colón, within the city of Colón though outside its municipal jurisdiction and operates as an autonomous entity of Panama.

== Location and size ==
The Colón Free Trade Zone is the largest free port in the Americas, and second largest in the world. It started operations in 1948 and occupies about 2.4 km^{2} (600 acres). It is divided in two large areas: one located in Colón, segregated from the city by a wall, and the other relatively new, in the harbor area, which is designated for warehouses, covering 0.53 km^{2} (130 acres) and 370 m (400 yards) from Colón's commercial sector.

== Issues ==
Exports from the free trade zone into neighboring countries are still subject to local rules, regulations, and payment requirements of the importing country. Venezuela, one of the larger buyers from the zone, has had difficulty meeting its obligations to exporters from the zone resulting in unpaid debts. Colombia implemented a series of tariffs which had the effect of reducing imports, primarily from Asia.

The Zone was created by Decree Law No. 18 of 17 June 1948, as an autonomous entity to develop the country's competitive advantages. Recently, the legislation for the Zone was modernized by Decree Law No. 8 of 4 April 2016, to allow for new businesses, such as electronic commerce, construction and operation of ports and other commercial activities.

== Tax aspects ==
Profits from foreign operations are totally exempt from income tax.

Dividends that come from external operations or those carried out abroad are subject to dividend tax of 5%, as established by law 8 of 2010:

Legal persons or companies established or established in the Colon Free Zone or in any other zone or free area established or that is created in the future are obliged to retain the Dividend Tax or participation fee of five percent (5%) of the profits that it distributes to its shareholders or partners when they come from:
1. Panamanian source or internal or local operations;
2. Foreign source or foreign or export operations;
3. Income exempt from Income Tax, provided for in paragraphs f, l and n of article 708 of the Code.

Companies domiciled in the Colon Free Zone are subject to pay 1% per year on the value of their net worth at the end of their fiscal period, as an Operation Notice tax. A tax that for entrepreneurs in the Colon Free Zone due to the current situation is the cause of the closure of multiple companies this year 2016.

== History ==
In 1917, three years after the opening of the Panama Canal, the possibility of building a free zone in the area in Colón was discussed. The Colon Chamber of Commerce raised the project of a free zone in 1929, and the project was taken into account in 1948, following the Second World War.

During the war, many Panamanian landowners rented land for the construction of defense centers and centers to provide services for the movement of US troops. With the end of the arrival of the troops, difficulties began. In order to alleviate these difficulties, Enrique A. Jiménez, president in 1945, had the initiative to make the free zone project a reality, using for this purpose the geographical position of the ports and the interoceanic waterway, a crucial step in navigation. Jimenéz recommended the reconsideration of the project prepared by George E. Roberts, vice president of the First National City Bank of New York, which contemplated the creation of the Colon Free Zone and had been presented to the government in 1929.

In 1946, the Panamanian government hired the American Thomas E. Lyons, an official of the United States Department of Commerce and recognized authority in the design of free zones, to carry out a feasibility study in the area suggested by the project. Based on its recommendations, the government gave its approval two years later, in June 1948, to creating an autonomous entity of 36 hectares where the trade of products was exempt from tariffs and had little paperwork. The Colon Free Zone will have its own legal status only dependent on the Presidency of the Republic and the Comptroller General of Panama. Lyons conceived the free zone as a strategic center that would connect the industries of the United States and Europe with the clients of Latin America, concentrating in the same geographic point mainly warehouses but also supplier industries, which in turn would bring collateral benefits to Panama in the area of construction, land prices, transfer of managerial knowledge, stimulation of business tourism, industrialization of Panama, increased revenues from the Panama Canal and increased air traffic.

Lyons' projections were met and hundreds of companies moved to the Colon Free Zone. Starting in 1970, when Panama became an international banking center, more companies established themselves in the free zone, and in 1988 its area expanded to almost 300 hectares, becoming the largest free zone in the Western Hemisphere and the second largest in the world, following Hong Kong. In the 1980s, the free zone began to have competition from other free zones in Miami and the Caribbean, and it was also affected by the debt crisis in other Latin American countries that reduced their imports.

In the 1990s, the Colon Free Zone regained its strength by becoming the Latin American headquarters for companies from Japan and recently industrialized countries in Asia, and a center for re-exports to the United States.

87% of all imports to the Free Zone during 2004 came mainly from Hong Kong, Taiwan, the United States, Japan, Korea, France, Mexico, Italy, Switzerland, the United Kingdom, Malaysia and Germany. In the same year, Colombia was the largest buyer of merchandise, with almost 16% of all its exports. Other important buyers were Venezuela, the domestic market of Panama, Guatemala, Ecuador, Costa Rica, the Dominican Republic, the United States, Chile, Honduras, Brazil, Nicaragua and El Salvador. These countries acquired around 83% of all exports from the Colon Free Zone.

In the 21st century, an idea promoted by some businessmen was to expand some of the benefits of the Colon Free Zone to the city of Colon to improve the socioeconomic conditions of the latter. The project is called Colón Puerto Libre.

== See also ==
- Index of international trade articles
- Multinational corporation
- Trade
- Free trade area
