= 2012–2013 Senkaku Islands tensions =

The 2012–2013 Senkaku Islands tensions was a dispute between Japan and China and Taiwan over the sovereignty of a group of uninhabited islands known as the Senkaku Islands in Japan and the Diaoyu Islands in China, following the Japanese government's nationalization of the islands in 2012.

== Background ==
In March 2012, Tokyo governor Shintaro Ishihara proposed purchasing the Senkaku Islands, known as the Diaoyu Islands in China, which also claims them. In April, he formally stated in a speech in Washington, D.C. that Tokyo would purchase the islands. After this idea was proposed, Tokyo opened a special account, "Tokyo Metropolitan Senkaku Islands Remittance Fund", at Mizuho Bank for the purpose of receiving donations. In addition to Mizuho Bank, Tokyo also opened an account for the same purpose at the Japan Post Bank. Some Japanese people even donated their pension funds to purchase the Diaoyu Islands. By 1 June, the funds raised had reached ¥1 billion yen (approximately ¥80 million renminbi). The Ministry of Foreign Affairs of China and the Ministry of Foreign Affairs of Taiwan protested against Shintaro Ishihara's purchase of the islands. In September, Japanese prime minister Yoshihiko Noda decided to purchase the islands in the name of the Japanese government, which would nationalize the islands. On 10 September, the Japanese government acquired the Senkaku Islands and their affiliated islands, Nankojima and Kitakojima, from Hiroyuki Kurihara for ¥2.05 billion yen (¥166 million renminbi), and paid the money on 11 September 2012.

After the Japanese government purchased the islands, the Chinese government dispatched maritime surveillance vessels to patrol the waters within 12 nautical miles of the islands to assert sovereignty, while the Japan Coast Guard frequently dispatched ships to expel Chinese vessels. Taiwan, after negotiations and communication with the Japanese government, signed the Diaoyu Islands Fisheries Agreement.

== 2012 ==
=== Japan ===
==== Government ====
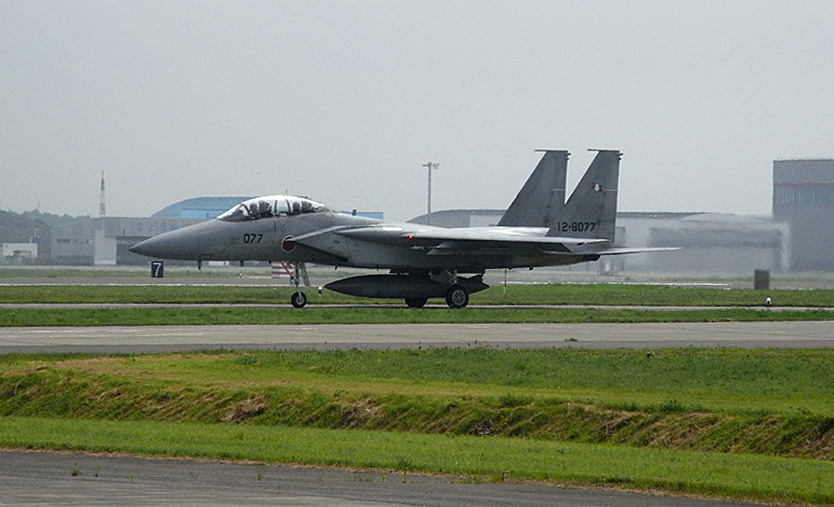
Japanese Mitsubishi F-15J

On 12 September 2012, Japanese foreign minister Kōichirō Genba urged at a press conference in Tokyo that "China should handle this matter in a calm and appropriate manner" and that "it is very important that both sides respond from the perspective of the overall situation, so as not to let the situation escalate further." Japanese prime minister Yoshihiko Noda said that "the whole country will defend the Senkaku Islands" and has drafted eight plans, including sending the Japan Self-Defense Forces to be stationed there permanently and building lighthouses on the islands. On 16 September 2012, Noda submitted the Senkaku Islands issue to the United Nations and planned to clarify Japan's position on the Senkaku Islands and Liancourt Rocks issues in his speech at the UN General Assembly summit, while also seeking support from the United States, Vietnam, and the Philippines. On 16 September 2012, Noda said on an NHK television political discussion program that all foreigners who land on the Senkaku Islands would be arrested, but Liancourt Rocks and the Southern Kuril Islands would be exempted because they are under the actual control of foreign countries. On 17 September 2012, Japanese foreign minister Kōichirō Genba, Defense Minister Satoshi Morimoto and U.S. Secretary of Defense Leon Panetta held talks. Panetta promised the Japanese side that "Article 5 of the Japan–U.S. Security Treaty applies to the Senkaku Islands." On 18 September 2012, Tōru Hashimoto, representative of the Japan Restoration Party and mayor of Osaka, made a speech saying that "Okinawa police must be stationed on the Senkaku Islands" and "build a ship dock" and that "[the Japanese government] is really too spineless." On 19 September 2012, Tokyo Governor Shintaro Ishihara held a press conference and said, "We might as well tell China: If you dare to come, we will cut you down." He also said that a shipyard and lighthouse would be built on the Senkaku Islands soon.

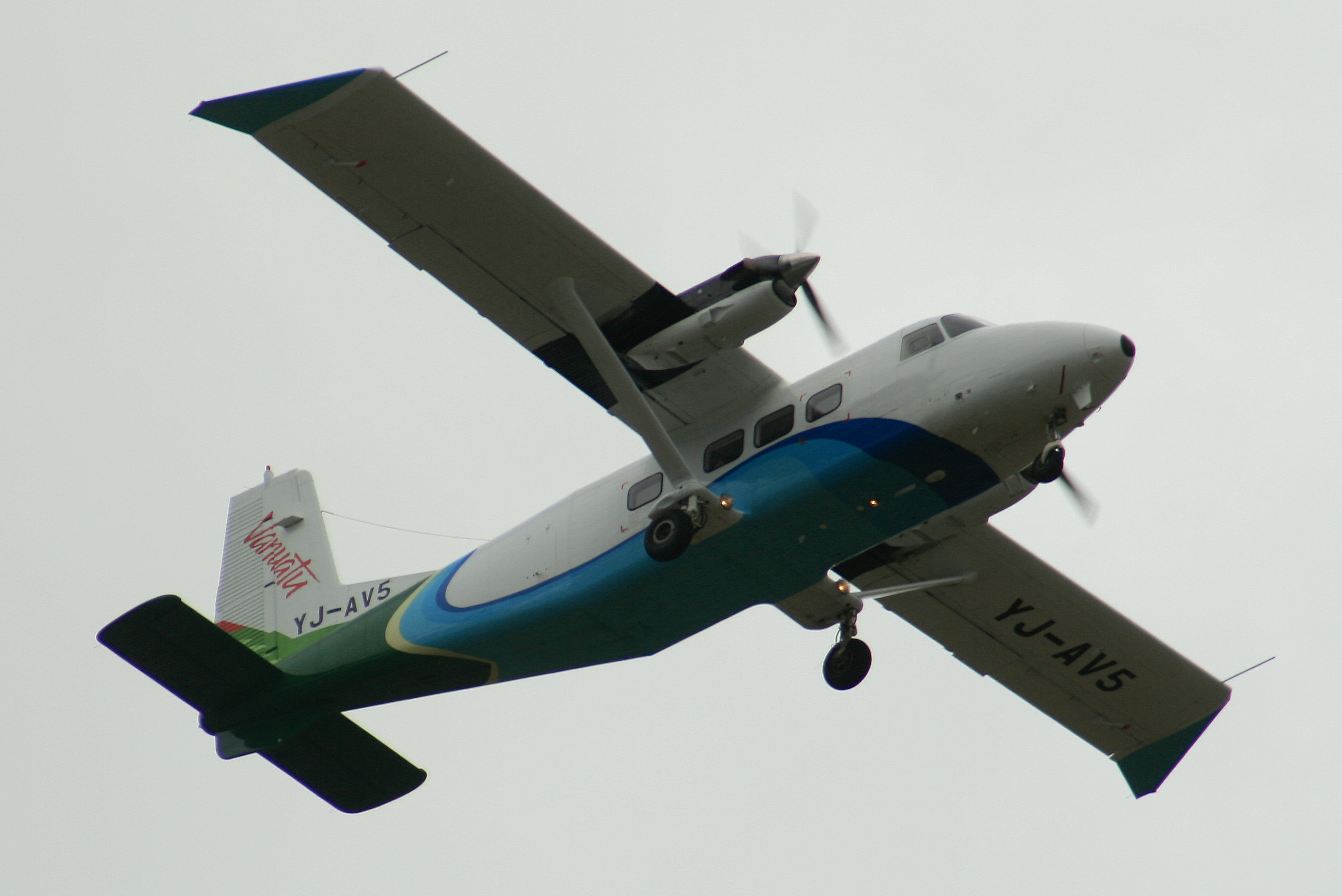
Chinese Harbin Y-12 reconnaissance aircraft

On 26 September 2012, Noda met with Indonesian president Susilo Bambang Yudhoyono, Colombian president Juan Manuel Santos, Mongolian president Tsakhiagiin Elbegdorj, Australian prime minister Julia Gillard, and other dignitaries during his free time at the United Nations Summit in New York City. He strongly criticized the anti-Japanese protests by China and sought support from various countries. On 27 September 2012, Noda stated at the United Nations Heads of State Conference: "Whether from a historical or international law perspective, the Senkaku Islands are Japan’s inherent territory, and this is a clear fact. There is no issue of sovereignty [with China], and this is the basic principle of our position. It is impossible to back down from this principle and make compromises." He said "Defending sovereignty, territory and territorial waters is a nation’s natural responsibility. Our country will continue to fulfill this responsibility in accordance with international law." On the same day, Shinzo Abe, the president of the Liberal Democratic Party, said at a press conference: "There is no territorial issue between China and Japan." On 28 September 2012, Japanese chief cabinet secretary Osamu Fujimura said at a press conference in response to Chinese foreign minister Yang Jiechi's debate at the UN General Assembly, "[The Senkaku Islands] are a unilateral claim by China and have no basis whatsoever." On the same day, the Japanese government announced that it would launch an ocean observation satellite in 2013 to monitor the Senkaku Islands. Late at night on 28 September 2012, Noda updated his blog and expressed his views on the anti-Japanese demonstrations in China: "The 'character' of the people themselves should also be questioned," and "Violence is unforgivable in any situation." On 29 September 2012, Seiji Maehara, former chairman of the Policy Research Council of the Democratic Party of Japan, delivered a speech in Kobe, stating that "China is a country that distorts and falsifies history." He also stated that "the so-called repeated 'intrudements into Japanese territorial waters' by Chinese government vessels are intended to lure the Self-Defense Forces into action in order to find a pretext to launch an attack on Japan."

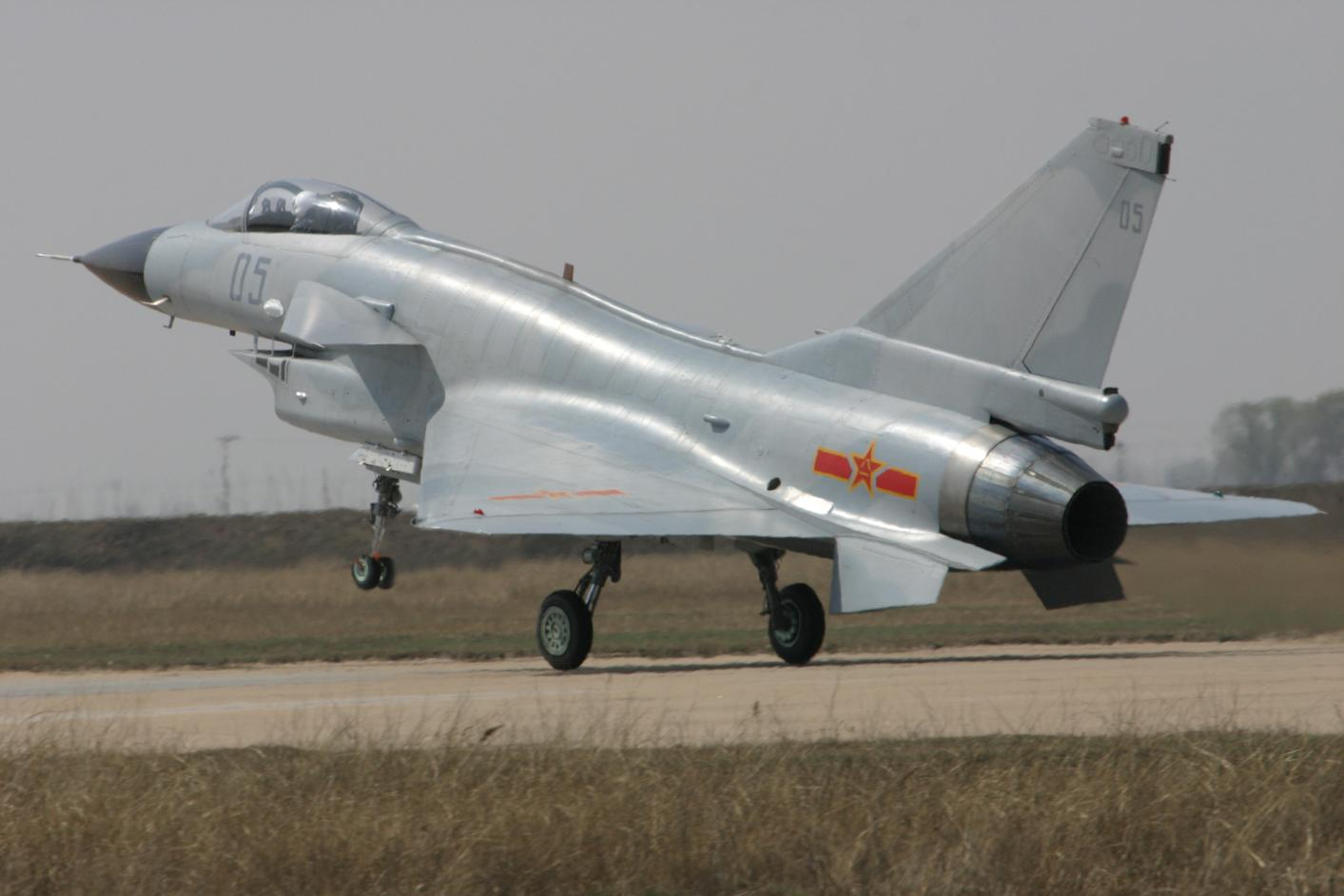
Chinese Chengdu J-10

On 2 October 2012, Noda ordered government officials to compile a book entitled "Three Truths About the Senkaku Islands" to explain the situation of the Senkaku Islands to all countries that have diplomatic relations and embassies with Japan: "(1) The Senkaku Islands are historically and under international law Japan’s ‘inherent territory’. (2) The purpose of ‘nationalization’ is to maintain stable administration. (3) Violence is not permitted for any reason." On 2 October 2012, the Consulate General of Japan in New York, in the name of Consul General Yasuhisa Kawamura, submitted an article to the online edition of The New York Times refuting the issue of the ownership of the Senkaku Islands. The article stated: "The Senkaku Islands are Japan's inherent territory, which is an indisputable fact both historically and under international law." He stated that "Opinions such as calling the Senkaku Islands spoils of the Sino-Japanese War (First Sino-Japanese War) are seriously wrong." On 5 October 2012, the Japanese Ministry of Foreign Affairs published an article from the People's Daily, the official newspaper of the Central Committee of the Chinese Communist Party, dated 8 January 1953, entitled "The People of the Ryukyu Islands Oppose the U.S. Administration," and stated that "It is evident that the People's Republic of China once regarded the Diaoyu Islands as part of Okinawa." The People's Daily article at that time acknowledged that the Diaoyu Islands belonged to the Ryukyu Islands, but also clearly stated that " the people of Ryukyu and the people of Japan are people of two different countries that do not include each other."

On 9 October 2012, Japanese Parliamentary Secretary for Agriculture, Forestry and Fisheries Eiichiro Washio said at a political funding banquet, "It doesn’t matter who owns the island, it can also belong to the Chinese government. Some of my words may sound grammatically incorrect, but this matter is as simple as writing ‘Chinese government’ in the register of Japanese citizens." On 10 October 2012, Foreign Minister Kōichirō Genba made a speech at a press conference and took out a World Atlas published by China in 1960, which listed the Diaoyu Islands as the Senkaku Islands. He said, "China only began to claim sovereignty over the relevant islands after 1970. In maps issued by China in the 1960s, the Senkaku Islands were clearly marked as Japanese territory." On 11 October 2012, Japanese deputy prime minister Katsuya Okada said in an interview with Phoenix Television: "The Chinese side said that when Premier Zhou Enlai met with Prime Minister Kakuei Tanaka, and when Deng Xiaoping met with Prime Minister Fukuda during his visit to Japan, they reached a tacit consensus on the Senkaku issue. But we do not think so. At that time, the Senkaku was also Japanese territory, without a doubt, and we will not put it aside. Regarding the content of the talks between Zhou Enlai and Kakuei Tanaka, and between Deng Xiaoping and Fukuda, the Japanese side has made the information public, and anyone can check it. I think there was no tacit consensus." He said "Japan believes that the territorial issue does not exist, and this position has not changed. But Japan recognizes that the Chinese government has a major concern about the Senkaku, which is a real problem. Both countries must handle this matter from this perspective." He continued "I think the Chinese side also understands Japan’s position to some extent." On 12 October 2012, Japanese minister of state for National Strategy Seiji Maehara said in an interview with TV Asahi that the Japanese government purchased the Senkaku Islands to prevent Shintaro Ishihara from causing trouble and to prevent war with China. On the same day, Japanese foreign minister Kōichirō Genba said that he would deliver a speech at the G8 summit on "the legitimacy of Japan's sovereignty over the Senkaku Islands" and that Japan would establish new embassies abroad in 2013 to strengthen international ties and information communication.

On 13 October 2012, Nagasaki Prefecture issued a stamp featuring the islands off the border of Nagasaki Prefecture, including the Senkaku Islands and Liancourt Rocks, which is under the actual jurisdiction of South Korea, in Japan's exclusive economic zone. On 14 October 2012, Japan, together with the United States, Australia, Singapore and other countries, held a military parade in Sagami Bay near Yokosuka, Kanagawa Prefecture. Yoshihiko Noda used phrases from the pre-war mobilization speech of the leaders of the Empire of Japan during World War II, such as "strive harder and make greater efforts." On 15 October 2012, Japanese foreign minister Kōichirō Genba met with U.S. Deputy Secretary of State William J. Burns. At a press conference, Genba said, "I hope to exchange views frankly with the U.S. on the current escalating tensions in East Asia. During the talks, both sides focused on China and North Korea and agreed that the U.S. and Japan should join forces to deal with China and North Korea." On the same day, LDP President Shinzo Abe met with Burns and said, "We will absolutely not concede an inch of land to China." He said "Japan and the U.S. are allies, and we hope that the U.S. will lean towards Japan. This is our thinking." On 17 October 2012, Shinzo Abe visited the Yasukuni Shrine "out of respect for the war dead [of the Japanese Empire in World War II]." He expressed "regret" for not visiting the shrine during his premiership and stated that if he were to become prime minister again, he would encourage his cabinet members to visit the shrine. On 18 October 2012, 67 members of the National Diet of the cross-party group "Parliamentary Association for Visiting Yasukuni Shrine" visited Yasukuni Shrine, including Minister of Land, Infrastructure, Transport and Tourism Yuichiro Hata, Minister in charge of Postal Privatization and Disaster Prevention Mikio Shimoji, former prime minister Yoshirō Mori, Vice President of the House of Councillors Hidehisa Otsuji, and Sunrise Party of Japan leader Takeo Hiranuma. On the same day, the United Nations General Assembly First Committee proposed a draft resolution aimed at reducing nuclear weapons, "Strengthening efforts to make nuclear weapons illegal," which Japan did not sign, and did not relinquish its possession of nuclear weapons.

On 19 October 2012, the Japanese government abolished the "officer-level exchange" program between the Japan Self-Defense Forces and the People's Liberation Army. This program had been running for 10 years. Prior to this, the government of China communicated with the Japanese government and hoped to postpone military exchanges between the two countries due to the Senkaku Islands issue. On 21 October 2012, Deputy Prime Minister Katsuya Okada expressed his views on the dispute, saying that "there is no territorial issue with the Senkaku Islands, but there is a 'dispute'," which was misunderstood and misreported by the media, who described the "dispute" as a "controversy." On 24 October 2012, Japanese defense minister Satoshi Morimoto inspected training on the recapture of remote islands. At the same time, the location of the joint military exercise between Japan and the United States was changed to the main island of the Ryukyu Islands. Previously, Japanese media reported that the Japanese government had canceled the joint military exercise, while mainland Chinese experts believed that the China's tough stance forced it to abandon the military exercise. On 25 October 2012, the results of the Japan Maritime Self-Defense Force's war game simulation against China were released, showing that the Japanese military annihilated the North Sea Fleet and East Sea Fleet of the People's Liberation Army with "minor losses". On 5 November 2012, during a joint military exercise between Japan and the United States, Japan deployed ninjas to demonstrate the "Iga-ryu ninjutsu". On 6 November 2012, Japanese Vice Foreign Minister Kazuya Shimba also refused to sign the draft joint statement on "strengthening efforts to make nuclear weapons illegal", arguing that "the draft is inconsistent with Japan’s security policy." Japanese right-wing figures claimed that Japan could produce nuclear weapons within 183 days. On 13 November 2012, Shintaro Ishihara formed the Sunrise Partyby reforming the Sunrise Party of Japan. He said the next step was to build a lighthouse on the Senkaku Islands.

On 3 December 2012, it was reported that Japanese ambassador to China Masato Kitera stated that the Senkaku Islands sovereignty dispute was affecting Sino–Japanese trade relations, and that Japan would strive to promote Sino–Japanese relations. When asked why the Japanese cabinet decided to complete the purchase of the islands a week before the 81st anniversary of the September 18 Incident, Kitera replied: "If you want to criticize the timing from this point of view, that may be true, but under the political circumstances at the time, we had to push forward each stage of the process. Our goal was to maintain the long-term stability and peaceful management of the Senkaku Islands. My previous position was Assistant to the Deputy Cabinet Secretary. As the person in charge of this matter at the Prime Minister's Office, I think Prime Minister Noda was most wary of the territorial nationalism of both sides, especially Japan. He was concerned about not letting this sentiment turn into a raging fire, so he repeatedly said that 'the purpose is to maintain the stability and management of the islands.' Nationalism is harmful to us. We are said to be constantly reiterating our position, but if necessary, we will continue to do this. We hope that in this process, Japan and China can find a way to narrow the gap." He also believed that the Japanese government's actions were to quell the nationalist sentiments in the country that were not beneficial to either China or Japan. He said "The Japanese government's purchase of the Senkaku Islands was the best choice. Unfortunately, China's understanding is different from Japan's." On 13 December 2012, in response to the Chinese maritime surveillance aircraft Haijian B-3837 flying over the islands, the Japan Air Self-Defense Force scrambled eight F-15 fighter jets and one E-2C early warning aircraft to intercept it. On 17 December 2012, LDP president Shinzo Abe, who was elected Prime Minister of Japan, held a press conference and said regarding the Senkaku Islands issue that "effective control is being maintained and there is no room for negotiation." At the same time, he expressed his deep regret for not being able to visit the Yasukuni Shrine during his previous term as prime minister. He said "This should not have developed into a diplomatic issue."

==== Public ====
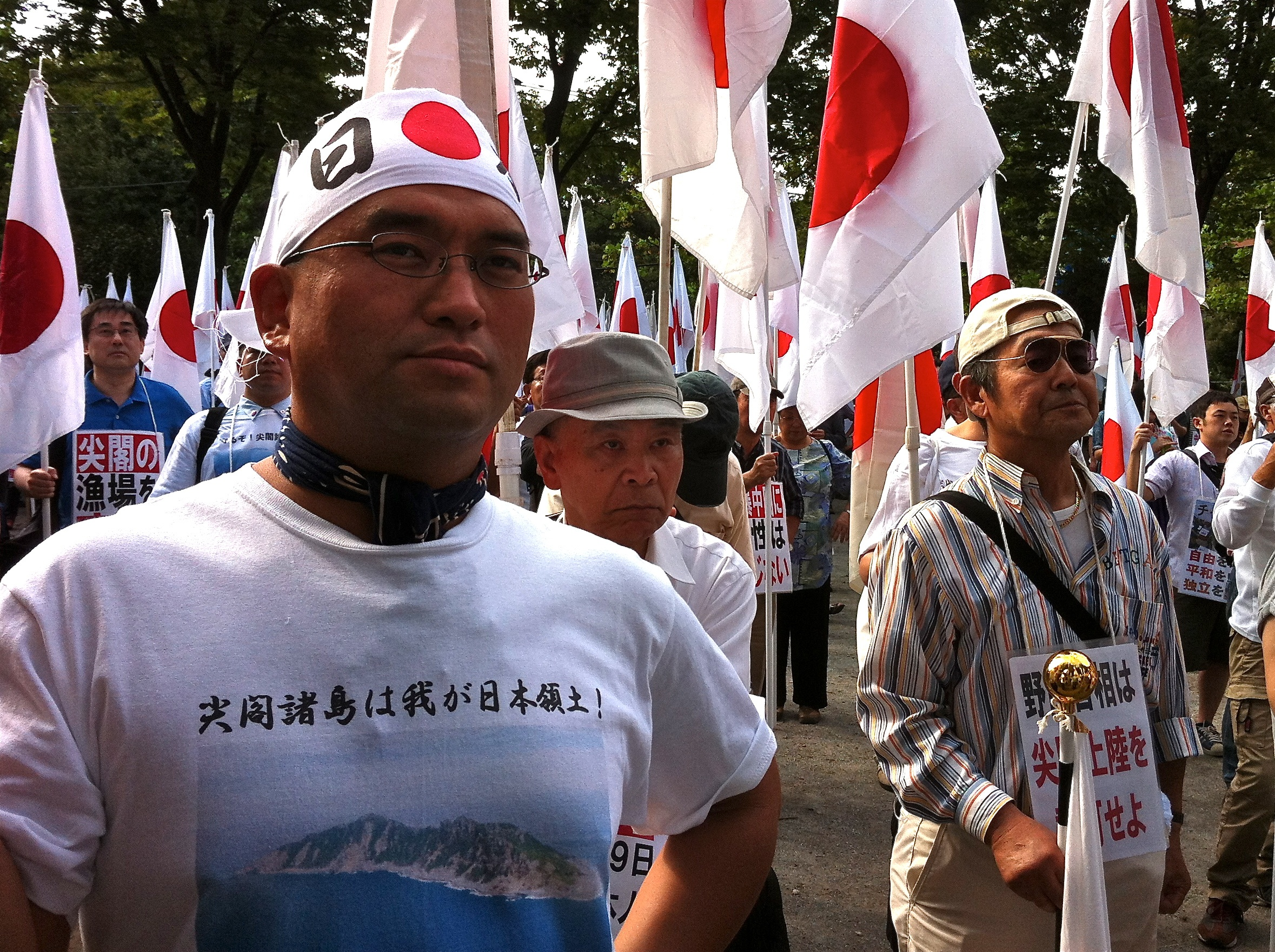
Japanese civilians demonstrating in support of the position that the Senkaku Islands belong to Japan

On 15 September 2012, more than 70 people in Tokyo, Japan, held a demonstration to protest against China and South Korea. The protesters held up signs that read "Kill China" and "Fuck Korea", and raised the flag of the Imperial Japanese Army. On 18 September 2012, the Okinawa Prefectural Police and the 11th Regional Coast Guard Headquarters of Naha revealed that around 0:30 a.m. on 18 September, three Japanese men boarded the fishing boat "Eighth Road Takemaru" and left Ishigaki Island, Okinawa Prefecture. Before leaving the port, the three men were inspected by the coast guard officers of the Ishigaki Coast Guard and assured the officers that "we are going to fish in the surrounding waters and will not land on the island." However, after the three men set off, at 9 a.m., two of them jumped into the sea and swam to the shore and landed on the Senkaku Islands. On 19 September 2012, several Chinese businesses and restaurants in Shimen Town, Fukuoka Prefecture, and Hakata Ward, Fukuoka City, were attacked. The National Police Agency launched an investigation on suspicion of damaging public property.

On 20 September 2012, Ken Moriyasu, a reporter for The Nikkei stationed in China, published an interview in the Financial Times, in which he stated that the Japanese Ministry of Defense was already discussing strategies for a war between China and Japan. If China and Japan went to war, Japan would win a great victory and sink all Chinese ships in the Senkaku Islands: "The Japan Self-Defense Forces have more powerful submarine detection and interception technology, while China's technology in this area is somewhat inferior. Therefore, Japan believes that it will be able to sink all Chinese ships in the waters around the Senkaku Islands." On 22 September 2012, a right-wing organization in Tokyo held a large-scale demonstration with nearly a thousand people, carrying banners such as "Chinese students get out" and "The Nanjing Massacre does not exist." On 25 September 2012, The Nikkei published a special article entitled "Irritable China Cannot Boycott Japanese Goods", arguing that the processed products of China are fundamentally inseparable from Japanese goods, and gave a detailed explanation using "semiconductors" as an example. On 27 September 2012, overseas Chinese collector Chen Canpei purchased an album of photos titled "Shanghai Garrison Commemorative" and "Greater Japanese Navy Special Landing Force" from a collection of Japanese veterans who had invaded China. On the afternoon of 29 September 2012, Japanese nationals Masataka Kishimoto and Hideki Takahashi threw mineral water bottles filled with ink at the wall of the Chinese Consulate General in Osaka and applied fire extinguishing agent to the shutter door. Meanwhile, Japanese people held a demonstration in the Ikebukuro area of Tokyo.

On 3 October 2012, several Japanese nationals once again entered the waters around the Senkaku Islands to assert their sovereignty. On 8 October 2012, the annual meetings of the International Monetary Fund and the World Bank were about to be held in Tokyo. The Sankei Shimbun advocated that the Japanese government should suppress China on monetary and economic issues at the annual meeting. On 10 October 2012, Hei Seki, a Japanese visiting professor at Takushoku University of Chinese descend, wrote an article in The Sankei Shimbun stated that the government of China was just a "paper tiger," merely "bluffing" and "intimidating and threatening." Japan had no need to be afraid, and Japan must strengthen the Japan–U.S. alliance to counter China. On 10 January 2013, ten Chinese fighter jets flew near the Senkaku Islands in the East China Sea. Japan dispatched several F-15 fighter jets to intercept them, but the Chinese fighter jets did not reach the airspace above the Senkaku Islands.

=== China ===
==== Government ====
On 10 September 2012, Chinese premier Wen Jiabao said in his speech at the Teachers' Day celebration at the China Foreign Affairs University: "The Chinese government and people cherish the hard-won national sovereignty and national dignity more than anyone else. Even in the most difficult and arduous circumstances, they remain steadfast. Diaoyu Islands are an inherent part of China's territory. On the issue of sovereignty and territory, the Chinese government and people will never back down an inch." On the same day, Chinese foreign minister Yang Jiechi urgently summoned Japanese ambassador to China Uichiro Niwa to express China's position: "The Chinese government and people will never tolerate the infringement and damage to national territorial sovereignty and will resolutely safeguard sovereignty over Diaoyu Islands and their affiliated islands. China strongly urges Japan to immediately revoke its erroneous decision to 'purchase the islands' and stop all actions that damage China's territorial sovereignty. Otherwise, Japan will have to bear all the consequences."; Chinese ambassador to Japan Cheng Yonghua also submitted a letter of protest to the head of the Japanese Ministry of Foreign Affairs. The same day, the government of China issued a statement on the baseline of the territorial sea of the Diaoyu Islands and their affiliated islands. On the same day, Yang Jiechi summoned the Japanese ambassador to lodge a strong protest. The Ministry of Foreign Affairs also issued a statement saying that the Japanese government's purchase of the islands was illegal and invalid, and that "the Chinese government will not sit idly by while its territorial sovereignty is violated." He said "If the Japanese side insists on going its own way, all the serious consequences caused thereby can only be borne by the Japanese side."

On 11 September 2012, the maritime surveillance vessels Haijian 46 and Haijian 49 arrived in the waters near the Diaoyu Islands and will take further actions to assert sovereignty as the situation warrants. On the same day, Geng Yansheng, spokesperson for the Ministry of National Defense of China, said at a press conference on the Diaoyu Islands issue: "Since the beginning of this year, the Japanese government has tolerated and condoned the right-wing forces that stirred up the island purchase controversy, and even took the initiative to purchase the islands themselves, which seriously undermines the overall development of Sino-Japanese relations. In recent years, Japan has expanded its military equipment under various pretexts, frequently created regional tensions, and repeatedly created incidents on the Diaoyu Islands issue, which deserves high vigilance from its Asian neighbors and the international community." On 13 September 2012, at a press conference held by the State Council Information Office, Minister of Commerce Jiang Zengwei said that "Japan’s so-called ‘purchase’ of the islands will inevitably have a negative impact on Sino-Japanese economic and trade relations." Li Baodong, China’s Permanent Representative to the United Nations, submitted the coordinates and nautical charts of the territorial sea baseline of Diaoyutai and its affiliated islands to UN Secretary-General Ban Ki-moon, fulfilling the obligations stipulated in the United Nations Convention on the Law of the Sea. Xinhua News Agency said that this move had completed all the legal procedures for publishing the baseline of the territorial sea of Diaoyu Islands and its affiliated islands. On the morning of 14 September 2012, at around 6:00 a.m., China Marine Surveillance vessels 50, 15, 26, 27 and 51 and 66 arrived in the waters of Diaoyu Islands and their affiliated islands to conduct rights protection patrols and law enforcement. Subsequently, Japanese Vice Foreign Minister Shusuke Kawai urgently summoned Chinese Ambassador to Japan Cheng Yonghua to lodge a "protest" with the Chinese government.

On 16 September 2012, China a proposal to the Commission on the Limits of the Continental Shelf established by the United Nations Convention on the Law of the Sea to delimit the continental shelf beyond 200 nautical miles in a part of the East China Sea, which naturally extends to the Ryukyu Islands Trough. On 18 September 2012, Minister of National Defense Liang Guanglie met with U.S. Secretary of Defense Leon Panetta, where Liang stated "We firmly oppose the U.S. claim that the U.S.-Japan Security Treaty applies to the Diaoyu Islands. We hope that the U.S. will take into account the overall situation of regional peace and stability and earnestly fulfill its commitment not to take sides on the issue of sovereignty over the Diaoyu Islands." However, Panetta did not respond, but only invited China to participate in the 2014 RIMPAC. On the same afternoon, Central Military Commission vice chairman Xu Caihou also met with Panetta. "China firmly opposes including the Diaoyu Islands in the U.S.-Japan Security Treaty. We hope that the U.S. will earnestly fulfill its commitment not to take sides on the issue of sovereignty over the Diaoyu Islands, so as to maintain regional stability and world peace." Panetta responded, "The U.S. has taken note of the recent Sino-Japanese island dispute and understands China's historical claims. The U.S. does not take sides on the Sino-Japanese Diaoyu Islands dispute and hopes that the issue will be resolved peacefully." On 20 September 2012, Wen Jiabao met with overseas Chinese in Brussels, Belgium, and said: "Recently, the Japanese authorities staged a farce about the Diaoyu Islands. The whole world should know that the Diaoyu Islands are China’s sacred and inherent territory. We must safeguard the sovereignty and territorial integrity of the country. We must take strong measures on this issue. On major issues involving national sovereignty and territorial integrity, we must maintain our integrity and never back down. There is nothing more important for a nation than dignity, autonomy, and independence."

On 25 September 2012, the State Council Information Office issued a white paper entitled "Diaoyu Islands are China's Inherent Territory," which detailed the historical process of Japan's annexation of the Ryukyu Islands, Taiwan Island, and Diaoyu Islands. On 27 September 2012, the Ministry of Foreign Affairs responded to a question regarding Noda's speech at the UN General Assembly, saying: "The Chinese people made enormous sacrifices and significant contributions to the victory of the World Anti-Fascist War. How could a defeated country occupy the territory of a victorious country?! Japan's position and actions on the Diaoyu Islands issue trample on the purposes and principles of the Charter of the United Nations. In essence, it is an inability to thoroughly reflect on and settle the history of Japanese militarist aggression, an attempt to deny the achievements of the victory of the World Anti-Fascist War, and a challenge to the post-war international order. This deserves high vigilance from the international community." On 27 September 2012, Li Baodong, the representative of China to the United Nations, said at the UN General Assembly debate in response to Kazuo Kodama's urging of China to abide by and fulfill the Treaty of Shimonoseki: "To this day, the Japanese government still clings to its old colonial mentality and has repeatedly violated its international obligations in an attempt to continue to occupy islands such as Diaoyu Islands. The Japanese government’s recent so-called ‘purchase’ of the islands is in fact an attempt to ‘legalize’ the Chinese territory it has stolen and occupied through illegal means, to confuse the public and deceive the media. This behavior of Japan seriously infringes on China's sovereignty, is an attempt to continue and legalize the results of its colonial policy, is a blatant denial of the victory of the World Anti-Fascist War, and is a serious challenge to the post-war international order and the purposes and principles of the Charter of the United Nations." On 28 September 2012, the Embassy of China in Japan received a letter signed in Japanese as "Yoshihiko Noda" containing a rifle bullet.

On 3 October 2012, in response to the successive incursions of Japanese right-wing forces into the waters around the Diaoyu Islands, China Marine Surveillance vessels 50, 15, 26, and 27 began patrolling the contiguous zone of the Diaoyu Islands to assert sovereignty. On 11 October 2012, Hong Lei, spokesperson for the Ministry of Foreign Affairs, said at a press conference regarding the issue raised by Japanese foreign minister Kōichirō Genba about the Chinese-published "World Atlas": "This is not the first time that Foreign Minister Genba has used materials taken out of context to try to support Japan's position. On such a serious and important issue involving national territorial sovereignty, using fragmented materials to support one's position can only prove that Japan has never legally possessed sovereignty over the Diaoyu Islands. Regarding the historical context of Japan's theft of the Diaoyu Islands during the First Sino-Japanese War, scholars from both China and Japan have made detailed and rigorous discussions, and Japan's own official historical materials can also constitute clear and unambiguous corroborating evidence. Japan ignores this and avoids mentioning it, instead advocating for Japan's aggression and expansion through war in history. This is completely 'robber logic'!" On 14 and 24 September, and 2 and 3 October 2012, the State Oceanic Administration claimed that Chinese marine surveillance vessels had repeatedly entered the territorial waters of the Diaoyu Islands for routine rights protection patrols.

On 25, 28 and 30 October 2012, the State Oceanic Administration claimed that marine surveillance vessels had entered the territorial waters of the Diaoyu Islands for routine rights protection patrols and had "implemented expulsion measures" against the Japanese patrol vessels they were monitoring. On 2, 3 and 4 November 2012 the State Oceanic Administration claimed that Chinese marine surveillance ships entered the territorial waters of the Diaoyu Islands for three consecutive days to carry out official duties and "implemented expulsion measures" against the Japanese patrol boats they were monitoring. On 13 December 2012, a Chinese maritime surveillance aircraft, B-3837, flew over the Diaoyu Islands. The Japanese military scrambled eight F-15 fighter jets and one E-2C early warning aircraft to intercept it. The Chinese Ministry of Foreign Affairs protested the F-15's entry into the airspace over the Diaoyu Islands. On 14 December 2012, Hong Lei, spokesperson for the Ministry of Foreign Affairs, answered a reporter's question regarding the Japanese military's dispatch of aircraft to intercept Chinese maritime surveillance ships, saying: "The Ministry of Foreign Affairs of China urges Japan to take China's solemn position seriously and stop all acts that infringe upon and damage China's territorial sovereignty." On 22 December 2012, a Y-12 patrol aircraft belonging to the State Oceanic Administration of China was intercepted by Japanese Navy F-15 fighter jets 120 kilometers away from the Diaoyu Islands.

==== Public ====
On 11 September 2012, in Beijing, several people held up banners to protest the Japanese government's purchase of the Diaoyu Islands. One of the men burned the Japanese flag and was stopped by security guards. In Guangzhou, several people held up banners in front of the Japanese Consulate General in Guangzhou to protest the Japanese government's purchase of the Diaoyu Islands. In Weihai, Shandong Province, more than 200 people held a march and sang the national anthem to protest the Japanese government's purchase of the Diaoyu Islands. On 11 September 2012, the Hong Kong Committee for the Protection of the Diaoyu Islands stated that the Kai Fung II had completed its repairs and planned to land on the Diaoyu Islands on the anniversary of the September 18 Incident. On 15 and 16 August 2012, large-scale anti-Japanese demonstrations broke out in many Chinese cities. On 24 September 2012, some fishermen from Shipu Fishing Port in Xiangshan County, Zhejiang, were interviewed by Phoenix Television reporters about fishing operations in the Diaoyu Islands. A captain surnamed Zheng said: "[Japan] their warships came out from Iriomote Island. There were planes and warships there. They used high-pressure water jets to spray our fishing boats. We also said that [Diaoyu Islands] are ours. The newspapers also reported that it is Chinese territory. We also said that. But there is nothing we can do. They use force. What force do we fishermen have? We are unarmed. Now we think about it, but we are afraid."

On 10 October 2012, Guo Chuan, a native of Qingdao, arrived at the waters 8 nautical miles from the Diaoyu Islands by sailboat. The Japan Coast Guard dispatched 6 patrol boats and several helicopters to surround and intercept him. On the way, he was escorted away from the Diaoyu Islands by the fishery administration vessels Zhoushan and 201. On 23 October 2012, China Youth Daily published a special article entitled "It is not a crime for Chinese people to travel to Japan. It is dangerous to force others to hate Japan". The article expressed its views on the recent trip of 2,200 Shanghai people to Japan on the Costa Victoria passenger ship. It pointed out that traveling to Japan is a legitimate right and a basic right of citizens. It cited history to say that the Japanese Empire also had anti-war factions when it invaded China. However, those who clamored on the Internet that Shanghai tourists to Japan were "traitors" were extreme nationalists who had no law or justice.

On 22 December 2012, the official website of the Chinese Basketball Association was attacked by hackers and paralyzed for two months. The official website displayed texts such as "Diaoyu Islands are Japanese territory, Chinese pigs, Great Japanese Empire". However, some netizens questioned: "It was done by the Chinese themselves. Pigs are not written like that in Japanese, and the character 'da' is not written like that either". Recently, various media outlets in China reprinted an article published by the Hong Kong-based China Review News Agency entitled "Ryukyu is not Japanese territory and should be returned to China or allowed to become independent." The article argues that since the Ryukyu Islands were secretly transferred between the United States and Japan, the Diaoyu Islands are even less Japanese territory.

=== Taiwan ===
==== Government ====
On 10 September 2012, Taiwan's Presidential Office and National Security Council held an emergency meeting to deal with the Japanese government's acquisition of the Diaoyu Islands. On the same day, Premier Sean Chen said: "The Diaoyu Islands are the territory of the Republic of China and are state property. If anyone engages in buying and selling them, we will not recognize their benefits." On 11 September 2012, Foreign Minister Timothy Yang summoned Taiwan's representative to Japan Shen Ssu-tsun, to return to Taiwan as quickly as possible. At the same time, he summoned Japanese representative to Taiwan Sumio Tarui to express a strong protest. "We do not accept or recognize Japan’s unilateral actions and call on Japan to immediately withdraw its decision to purchase the islands." On 12 September 2012, Taiwan's Coast Guard Administration announced it would arrange for the 500-ton Lienchiang ship and the 600-ton Hualien ship to conduct a handover exercise for fishing protection duties in the waters of Diaoyu Islands. President Ma Ying-jeou said: "The fishermen of the northeastern corner of Taiwan have been fishing in the waters of Diaoyu Islands for more than 100 years. The Coast Guard Administration of the Executive Yuan cannot go there occasionally to protect fishermen. It must go there often, and even every day during the fishing season." On 16 September 2012, Fan Chiang Tai-chi said at a press conference that the Ministry of State Security would issue "offshore island stamps" including Diaoyu Island and its affiliated islands, Pengjia Islet, Dongsha Islands, Nansha Islands, etc. On 3 September 2012, Taipei Mayor Hau Lung-pin set the theme of the following week's National Day as "Defend Diaoyu Islands," and will promote the history of Diaoyu Islands belonging to Toucheng Township, Yilan County to the citizens of Taipei.

On 10 October 2012, Ma Ying-jeou reiterated his position on the Diaoyu Islands in his National Day speech, defending sovereignty and maritime borders. On 11 October 2012, the Ministry of Foreign Affairs published advertisements in four major American newspapers, namely The New York Times, The Washington Post, Los Angeles Times and The Wall Street Journal, using a combination of pictures and text to assert sovereignty over the Diaoyu Islands. On 17 October 2012, Terry Gou, chairman of Foxconn, proposed a "three-way meeting" to resolve the Diaoyu Islands issue. This involves cooperation among the private sectors of China, Taiwan, and Japan to develop resources in the waters surrounding the Diaoyu Islands, with the remaining portion kept as a reserve. Ma Ying-jeou stated, "I strongly agree with this idea." On 19 October 2012, Kuomintang legislator Yang Ying-hsiung proposed the "Amendment to the Offshore Islands Development Act," which would list Kinmen, Matsu, Penghu, Dongsha, Nansha Islands and Diaoyutai Islands as the offshore territories of the Republic of China. On 22 October 2012, Chou Lin, Taiwan's ambassador to Panama, expressed serious concern to Panamanian acting foreign minister Francisco Álvarez De Soto regarding the Panamanian president's statement on the Diaoyu Islands, and promised to provide Panama with historical data on the Diaoyu Islands. On 14 December 2012, the Ministry of Foreign Affairs issued a press release expressing "serious concern" over the standoff between Chinese and Japanese maritime surveillance aircraft and fighter jets, and reiterated its basic position of "sovereignty belongs to us, shelving disputes, peaceful mutual benefit, and joint development."

==== Public ====
On the morning of 12 September 2012, former president Lee Teng-hui met with Taiwanese and Japanese media at the Mite Hotel in Nantou and said, "Because there is no sovereignty issue with the Diaoyu Islands, only a fisheries issue," "What am I supposed to do about what happens in your country [Japan]? I can’t control what kind of wife your son marries!" "[The acquisition] of the Diaoyu Islands is none of our business; it’s a Japanese matter." Lee Teng-hui’s conversation with Japanese writer Sawako Agawa was published in the Japanese magazine Shūkan Bunshun that "The Diaoyu Islands have always been Japanese territory. I have made it clear to the outside world since I became president." On 12 September 2012, Yok Mu-ming, chairman of the New Party, called out Lee Teng-hui and the Taiwan Solidarity Union, asking, "Is the Diaoyu Islands our territory?" On 12 September 2012, Democratic Progressive Party Chairman Su Tseng-chang said regarding the Japanese government's formal acquisition of the Diaoyu Islands: "The Ma administration needs to take a tough stance." On 17 September 2012, Taiwanese activists organized the "All-People Alliance to Protect the Diaoyu Islands" and planned to launch a march and demonstration on 23 September, with the route from the Sun Yat-sen Memorial Hall to the Japan–Taiwan Exchange Association, and to deliver a letter of protest. On 21 September 2012, the Taiwanese work platform ship "Dahan 711" flew the slogans "Defend Diaoyutai" and "Diaoyutai is ours" to the Diaoyu Islands to assert sovereignty. However, it was attacked by Japanese Coast Guard ships and was only able to escape the harassment of the Japanese side and return safely under the escort of the Coast Guard Administration and the Starship. On the same day, the Times Weekly reported that a Japanese Maritime Self-Defense Force Rear Admiral secretly came to Taiwan and reached a consensus with the Ma administration to "cool down" the Diaoyutai issue. President Ma Ying-jeou personally issued an order to the Coast Guard to protect the Diaoyutai flag and not to let him see the five-star flag appear on the Diaoyutai Islands in the future.

On 24 September 2012, in protest against Japan's nationalization of the Diaoyu Islands, fishermen from Su'ao and Toucheng in Yilan County organized the "Diaoyu Islands Fisheries Protection Committee" and launched the "For Survival, Protect Fishing Rights" action. At 3 pm on 24 September, 78 fishing boats from Su'ao and Toucheng gathered and departed from Nanfang'ao Fishing Port for the Diaoyu Islands, arriving in the waters around the Diaoyu Islands on September 25. This action was the largest civilian Diaoyu Islands protection action in Taiwan's history, with 58 fishing boats and 292 fishermen participating. The Coast Guard Administration also deployed 12 vessels to provide escort throughout the entire operation. When Taiwanese vessels arrived in the waters around the Diaoyu Islands, they confronted 34 ships and fixed-wing aircraft dispatched by the Japan Coast Guard. Both sides used water cannons to drive each other away. In the end, Taiwanese fishing boats and Coast Guard vessels broke through the encirclement of the Japanese Coast Guard vessels. The closest Taiwanese fishing boats and Coast Guard vessels came to the Diaoyu Islands was only 2.1 nautical miles. This was the closest Taiwanese vessels had come to the Diaoyu Islands since the 2000s. On 30 September 2012, activists in Yilan County launched a large-scale demonstration to protect the Diaoyu Islands, which was supported by thousands of people. The crowd chanted: "Japanese, get out of Diaoyu Islands!" and "Diaoyu Islands belong to Taiwan and Toucheng." However, County Magistrate Lin Tsung-hsien did not attend.

On 15 October 2012, former vice president Annette Lu held a press conference and said, "Lee Teng-hui served as president for 12 years and should not say that Diaoyutai belongs to Japan." Regarding the Diaoyutai fisheries negotiations between Taiwan and Japan, she said, "Without sovereignty, how can there be fishing rights?"

== 2013 ==
=== January ===
On the morning of 1 January 2013, three Chinese maritime surveillance vessels, namely Haijian 51, 15, and 83, belonging to the State Oceanic Administration of China, patrolled in the "interconnected waters between China and Japan" near the Diaoyu Islands. The Japan Coast Guard dispatched patrol vessels to track and warn them to leave. On 2 January, Kyodo News reported that the 11th Regional Coast Guard Headquarters of Japan revealed that the three Chinese maritime surveillance vessels had left the waters near the Senkaku Islands. On 3 January, the Japanese newspaper The Sankei Shimbun reported that Japan's new prime minister Shinzo Abe revised the National Defense Program Guidelines in response to China's attempt to seize the Senkaku Islands. On the same day, U.S. president Barack Obama signed the National Defense Authorization Act for Fiscal Year 2013, which explicitly stipulated that "the Senkaku Islands are covered by Article 5 of the US-Japan Security Treaty, and (the United States) will not accept unilateral actions by a third country." On the same day, Masahiro Ohara, the Japanese consul general in Sydney, wrote in The Australian that "the Senkaku Islands are closer to Japan and are Japanese territory," and proposed that the Senkaku Islands territorial dispute be submitted to the International Court of Justice for adjudication. At the meeting to formulate the "2013 Government Budget," the Liberal Democratic Party proposed that "in order to deal with Chinese aircraft patrolling the airspace over the Senkaku Islands and expanding military equipment, the 2013 defense budget should be increased to ¥4.7 trillion yen." At the same time, it proposed to modify F-15 fighter jets for use against Chinese maritime surveillance aircraft.

On 5 January, a Y-12 maritime surveillance patrol aircraft belonging to the State Oceanic Administration of China took off from the East China Sea and flew near the Diaoyu Islands. Japan Air Self-Defense Force F-15 fighter jets scrambled to intercept it. On the same day, Japan Coast Guard Commissioner Takashi Kitamura pointed out in a media interview that Japan will establish a dedicated base and special forces on Ishigaki Island in Okinawa Prefecture to guard the Diaoyu Islands, and establish a dedicated patrol fleet to deal with Chinese maritime surveillance ships. Japanese prime minister Shinzo Abe instructed the Japan Air Self-Defense Force to take all necessary precautions to prevent Chinese aircraft and maritime surveillance ships from entering the waters around the Senkaku Islands. On 6 January, Japanese foreign minister Fumio Kishida called for diplomatic negotiations between China and Japan to address the Senkaku Islands issue during a domestic television program. On 7 January, Chou Chin-fa, Director of Taiwan's Office in Sydney, wrote an article in The Australian, calling on all parties to set aside their disputes and engage in peaceful dialogue. On 8 January, President Ma Ying-jeou called for a "resource-sharing" approach to resolve the Diaoyu Islands dispute. Prime Minister Shinzo Abe of Japan summoned Japanese defense minister Itsunori Onodera and demanded that he strengthen surveillance. Defense Minister Itsunori Onodera and U.S. defense secretary Panetta held a telephone conversation to discuss how the two countries should respond to the patrols of Chinese maritime surveillance ships in the waters around the Senkaku Islands. In the morning, President Ma Ying-jeou met with a delegation from the Taiwan Studies Group of the Fairbank Center for Chinese Studies at Harvard University and proposed that the Diaoyu Islands issue be shelved and resources shared. In the evening, Japanese foreign minister Fumio Kishida spoke with U.S. secretary of state Hillary Clinton by telephone. Clinton hoped that Japan and China would resolve the territorial sovereignty dispute over the Senkaku Islands through dialogue, and at the same time, Clinton promised that the U.S.-Japan Security Treaty applied to the Diaoyu Islands.

On 9 January, Japanese prime minister Shinzo Abe summoned Cabinet Crisis Management Officer Toshiro Yonemura and other officials, instructing the Japanese Ministry of Defense and the Self-Defense Forces to issue "tracer round warnings" to Chinese aircraft and maritime surveillance vessels in the waters around the Senkaku Islands. On the same day, a reporter from Kyodo News boarded a Japanese Maritime Self-Defense Force P3C anti-submarine patrol aircraft to monitor the waters around the Senkaku Islands from the air. On 10 January, Japanese media reported that the Japan Coast Guard would establish a new "Senkaku Islands Special Operations Team" with 12 ships and about 400 personnel. In the evening, Annette Lu, pointed out at a welcome dinner for Taiwanese compatriots in the Philippines that "Diaoyu Islands belong to Taiwan." On 11 January, Japanese prime minister Shinzo Abe said at a press conference regarding the Senkaku Islands issue: "We will absolutely not compromise, nor will we allow the Senkaku Islands to become a subject of negotiations." Japanese defense minister Itsunori Onodera explained that Japan will form a "Senkaku Islands Special Operations Unit." On 15 January, Japanese defense minister Itsunori Onodera announced that if Chinese aircraft violated Japanese airspace, Japan would fire tracer rounds as a "warning shot." On 16 January, Jia Qinglin, Chairman of the National Committee of the Chinese People's Political Consultative Conference, met with former Japanese prime minister Yukio Hatoyama at the Great Hall of the People to ease tensions over the Diaoyu Islands. Takashi Kitamura, Commissioner of the Japan Coast Guard, told reporters that a new pier would be added at Ishigaki Port to deal with the Senkaku Islands situation. On 17 January, Japanese defense minister Itsunori Onodera met with U.S. ambassador to Japan John Roos, who stated that the U.S.-Japan Security Treaty applies to the Senkaku Islands.

On 19 January, Japanese foreign minister Fumio Kishida met with U.S. secretary of state Hillary Clinton. Clinton said, "The Senkaku Islands are under Japan's 'governance,' and we oppose any unilateral attempt to undermine Japan's 'governance.'" Annette Lu, proposed that Taiwan donate the Diaoyu Islands. On 19 January, Japanese prime minister Shinzo Abe entrusted Natsuo Yamaguchi, leader of Komeito, to deliver a handwritten letter to Xi Jinping, General Secretary of the Chinese Communist Party, proposing that the two countries hold a summit meeting to negotiate the Senkaku Islands issue. On 21 January, Natsuo Yamaguchi proposed that no Chinese or Japanese aircraft should appear near the Senkaku Islands, and that the Senkaku Islands issue should be resolved by future generations. On 22 January, David Lin, head of the Ministry of Foreign Affairs of Taiwan, responded to reporters' questions by saying: "The Diaoyu Islands are affiliated islands of Taiwan, and we cannot make any concessions on sovereignty." On 24 January, three Chinese maritime surveillance vessels patrolled the waters around the Diaoyu Islands and left after being hailed by the ROC Guard Administration. On 27 January, the Japanese Self-Defense Forces deployed early warning aircraft from within Japan to begin 24-hour surveillance of the Senkaku Islands. On 27 January, President Ma Ying-jeou said: "Many people do not know that these small islands are Taiwan's affiliated islands. In the 17th century, they were included in the patrol range of the navy. We advocate resolving disputes peacefully." On 29 January, the Japan Coast Guard deployed 20 ships and 13 aircraft to form the "Senkaku Defense Task Force," establishing a new "Senkaku Exclusive Unit" with a size of 600 personnel.

=== February ===
In February, Ma Ying-jeou explained that the reason for not cooperating with the mainland on the Diaoyu Islands issue was that the mainland did not allow him to mention the treaty between the Republic of China and Japan, and did not allow him to talk about sovereignty. "Without sovereignty, where would fishing rights come from?"

=== March ===
On 23 March, the Japanese Ministry of Defense announced plans to add six new submarines to the Maritime Self-Defense Force and train 400 submarine officers in order to strengthen the defense of the Senkaku Islands.

=== April ===
On 23 April, Prime Minister Shinzo Abe stated that if any Chinese personnel landed on the Senkaku Islands, they would be "forcefully driven away." In response to a question in the Diet, he said that he would "take decisive action against any attempt to enter territorial waters and land on the Senkaku Islands." The Chinese Ministry of Foreign Affairs responded that Japanese officials' visits to the Yasukuni Shrine were "an attempt to deny Japan's history of aggression," and that Japanese activists' boat trips into the waters around the Diaoyu Islands were "illegal acts that create trouble," and that a strong protest had been lodged with Japan.

=== May ===
On 1 May, U.S. defense secretary Chuck Hagel met with Japanese defense minister Itsunori Onodera. At a press conference afterward, he stated, "The United States recognizes that the Senkaku Islands are currently under Japanese jurisdiction and fall within the scope of the U.S.-Japan Security Treaty." President Ma Ying-jeou expressed his approval of the signing of the Taiwan-Japan Fisheries Agreement on April 10 and the establishment of the "Taiwan-Japan Fisheries Committee." On 3 May, fishermen in Okinawa Prefecture strongly opposed the permission for Taiwanese fishermen to fish in Japan's Exclusive Economic Zone (EEZ). On the same day, the Japanese commander in charge of operations over the Senkaku Islands was killed in a motorcycle accident in Tokyo. On 6 May, David F. Helvey, the U.S. Deputy Assistant Secretary of Defense for East Asia, said: "I would like to add that, regarding the East China Sea issue, no unilateral action by either side will shake our position that the Senkaku Islands remain under Japanese administrative jurisdiction." On 8 May, President Ma Ying-jeou, while presiding over the Sun Yat-sen meeting of the Kuomintang, affirmed the Taiwan-Japan fisheries agreement and proposed the "East China Sea Peace Initiative". On 8 May, the Taiwan-Japan fisheries agreement officially came into effect, allowing Taiwanese fishermen to fish in Japan's exclusive economic zone. Japan's Okinawa Prefecture expressed strong protest.

On 24 May, Japanese Maritime Self-Defense Force ships and U.S. Navy vessels stationed in Japan patrolled the waters around the Senkaku Islands and cut the trawl lines of a Japanese tuna fishing boat from Miyazaki Prefecture. Xinhua Overseas Chinese News Network pointed out that this action was to obstruct Chinese fishermen from fishing in the waters around the Diaoyu Islands. On 26 May, Chinese premier Li Keqiang visited the site of the Potsdam Conference in Germany and delivered a speech: "The Potsdam Declaration reaffirmed the principles established by the Cairo Declaration, namely that Japan must return the islands of Northeast China and Taiwan that it stole. This is an important guarantee for the world peace order after World War II." On 27 May, Japanese chief cabinet secretary Yoshihide Suga responded to Chinese premier Li Keqiang's speech, saying it was "a serious disregard for history and absolutely unacceptable."

On 27 May, Japanese chief cabinet secretary Yoshihide Suga responded to Chinese foreign minister Wang Yi by saying: "I think the Chinese statement is a statement that ignores history. The Senkaku Islands are our territory, legally determined by the Treaty of San Francisco. Before that, before the Sino-Japanese War and the Treaty of Peace between Japan and China (i.e., the Treaty of Shimonoseki), the Senkaku Islands were Japanese territory." On 31 May, more than 20 websites of Japanese florists, restaurants, insurance companies, dentists, and other businesses were hacked and had the slogan "Diaoyu Islands belong to China" displayed.

=== June ===
On 1 June, Japanese defense minister Itsunori Onodera delivered a speech at the 12th Asian Security Summit (Shangri-La Dialogue) in Singapore, stating that "on the Senkaku Islands issue, Japan is determined to make every effort to avoid any unforeseen incidents." On 2 June, at the Shangri-La Dialogue, Qi Jianguo, Deputy Chief of the General Staff of the People's Liberation Army, said: "China's insistence on the attitude of 'leaving problems for future generations to solve' is beyond doubt. Twenty years ago, Comrade Xiaoping put forward the idea of shelving disputes by exercising political wisdom. Now, some issues such as the East China Sea and the South China Sea cannot be completely resolved in the short term, and the relevant countries should have sufficient strategic patience." Regarding the issue of the ownership of the Ryukyu Islands, he said: "The relevant remarks 'belong to individual scholars' and do not represent the views of the Chinese government. The Chinese government's position on the sovereignty of the Ryukyu Islands has not changed. The ownership of the Ryukyu Islands and the Diaoyu Islands are issues of different natures." On the same day, Japanese chief cabinet secretary Yoshihide Suga responded to the remarks of Qi Jianguo saying: "Any claim by China regarding the Senkaku Islands is unacceptable. There is no sovereignty issue that needs to be resolved regarding the Senkaku Islands." He said "The Senkaku Islands are our inherent territory, which is beyond doubt both historically and under international law, and are currently under our effective control."

On 3 June, Liu Yunshan, member of the Secretariat of the Chinese Communist Party, met with a cross-party delegation from Japan led by Hiromu Nonaka at the Great Hall of the People. Nonaka said, "When diplomatic relations between China and Japan were normalized, there was a consensus between the leaders of the two countries to shelve the Senkaku Islands issue." On 4 June, Japanese foreign minister Fumio Kishida denied at a press conference in the morning that there had been any consensus between China and Japan on shelving the Senkaku Islands dispute: "According to our diplomatic record, there is no such thing."

=== July ===
Around 5:00 a.m. on 1 July, four Chinese maritime surveillance vessels (Haijian 51, 23, 49, and 5001) entered the 12-nautical-mile territorial waters of the Diaoyu Islands, attempting to drive away four fishing boats that were chanting "Go Japan!" Upon learning of this, the Japan Coast Guard immediately dispatched 10 patrol vessels and launched several rubber boats carrying Coast Guard officers to patrol the area around the Japanese fishing boats. The four Japanese fishing boats left the Diaoyu Islands waters around noon, followed by the Japan Coast Guard patrol vessels and the Chinese maritime surveillance vessels. Hua Chunying, spokesperson for the Chinese Ministry of Foreign Affairs, commented on Japan's actions, saying: "The current serious difficulties in China–Japan relations are caused by Japan's repeated provocative actions on the Diaoyu Islands issue. Japan should not keep 'dialogue' to itself, but should earnestly face up to history and reality, and show sincerity and take practical actions to meet China halfway." On the same day, a Bahamian-flagged marine survey vessel, "Discoverer 2," belonging to a Chinese oil company, entered the exclusive economic zone of the Diaoyu Islands and did not leave until 4:25 a.m. the following day. On 2 July, Masaki Shimokawa, Counselor of the Asian and Oceanian Affairs Bureau of the Japanese Ministry of Foreign Affairs, sent a telegram to Han Zhiqiang, Minister of the Chinese Embassy in Japan, expressing "extreme regret" over the entry of Chinese maritime surveillance vessels into the waters around the Senkaku Islands.

On 18 July, Shinzo Abe inspected two islands near the Senkaku Islands and said that he would "strengthen vigilance and defense of the territory." On 29 July, the U.S. Senate passed a resolution accusing China of "intimidating and using force" around the Senkaku Islands and in the South China Sea in order to change the territorial status quo. The resolution also reiterated that the United States believes the Senkaku Islands are under Japanese control and that this understanding will not change due to unilateral actions by a third party. The United States will unwaveringly respond to any armed attack in accordance with the U.S.-Japan Security Treaty.

=== August ===
On 21 August, Japanese prime minister Shinzo Abe met and spoke with U.S. Republican senator John McCain. McCain had previously discussed some issues concerning Okinawa with Defense Minister Itsunori Onodera. McCain emphasized that "the Senkaku Islands are Japanese territory and that there is no need for discussion. He also stated that this is the position of the U.S. Congress and the U.S. government, and that it will be conveyed to China." He added, "China has violated Japan's sovereignty; countries threatened by China's maritime activities should strengthen cooperation and take a unified stance against China."
