= List of ships of the China Coast Guard =

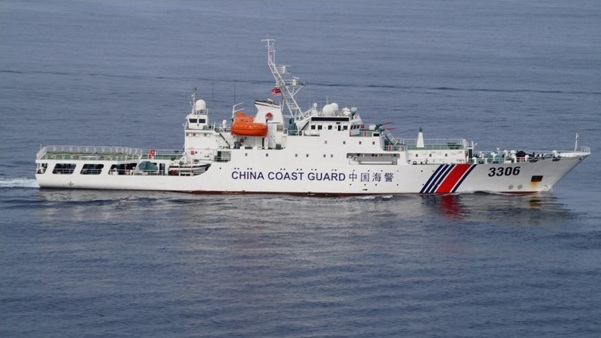
China Coast Guard Shucha II-class cutter Wanshan (formerly 3306, now 3301).

The China Coast Guard operates a variety of vessels for its duties.

In addition, the China Coast Guard also operates a handful of Harbin Z-9 and Z-8 helicopters, and a maritime patrol aircraft based on the Harbin Y-12 transport.

== Pennant numbers ==
Directly subordinate bureaus have 4 digit pennant numbers while local bureaus have 5 digit pennant numbers.

Local-level bureaus
| Province/city | Pennant # Format |
|---|---|
| Jiangsu | 11*** |
| Shanghai | 12*** |
| Zhejiang | 13*** |
| Fujian | 14*** |
| Guangdong | 21*** |
| Guangxi | 22*** |
| Hainan | 23*** |
| Liaoning | 31*** |
| Heibei | 32*** |
| Tianjin | 33*** |
| Shandong | 34*** |

Directly subordinate bureaus
| Bureau | Pennant # Format |
|---|---|
| 1 (Shanghai) | 1*** |
| 2 (Ningbo, Zhejiang) | 2*** |
| 3 (Guangzhou, Guangdong) | 3*** |
| 4 (Wenchang, Hainan) | 4*** |
| 5 (Sanya, Hainan) | 5*** |
| 6 (Qingdao, Shandong) | 6*** |

== Vessels ==
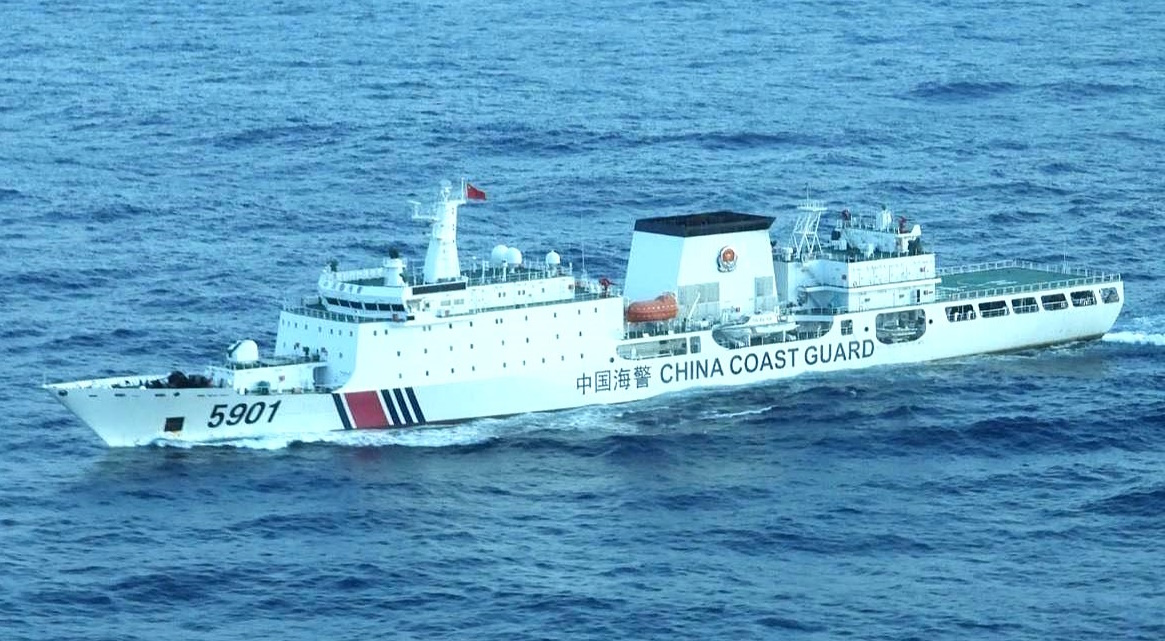
Nansha (5901)

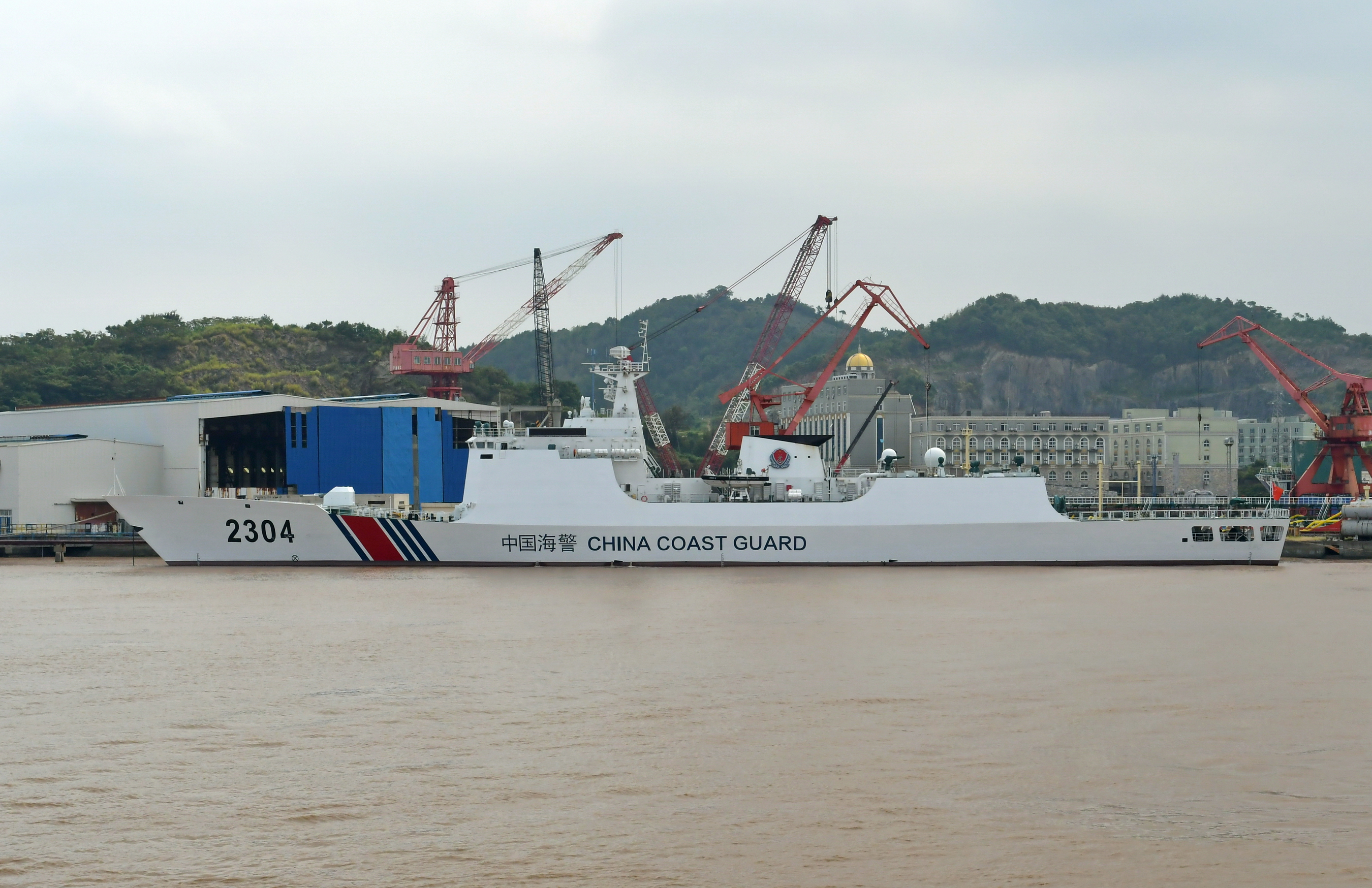
Baita (2304)

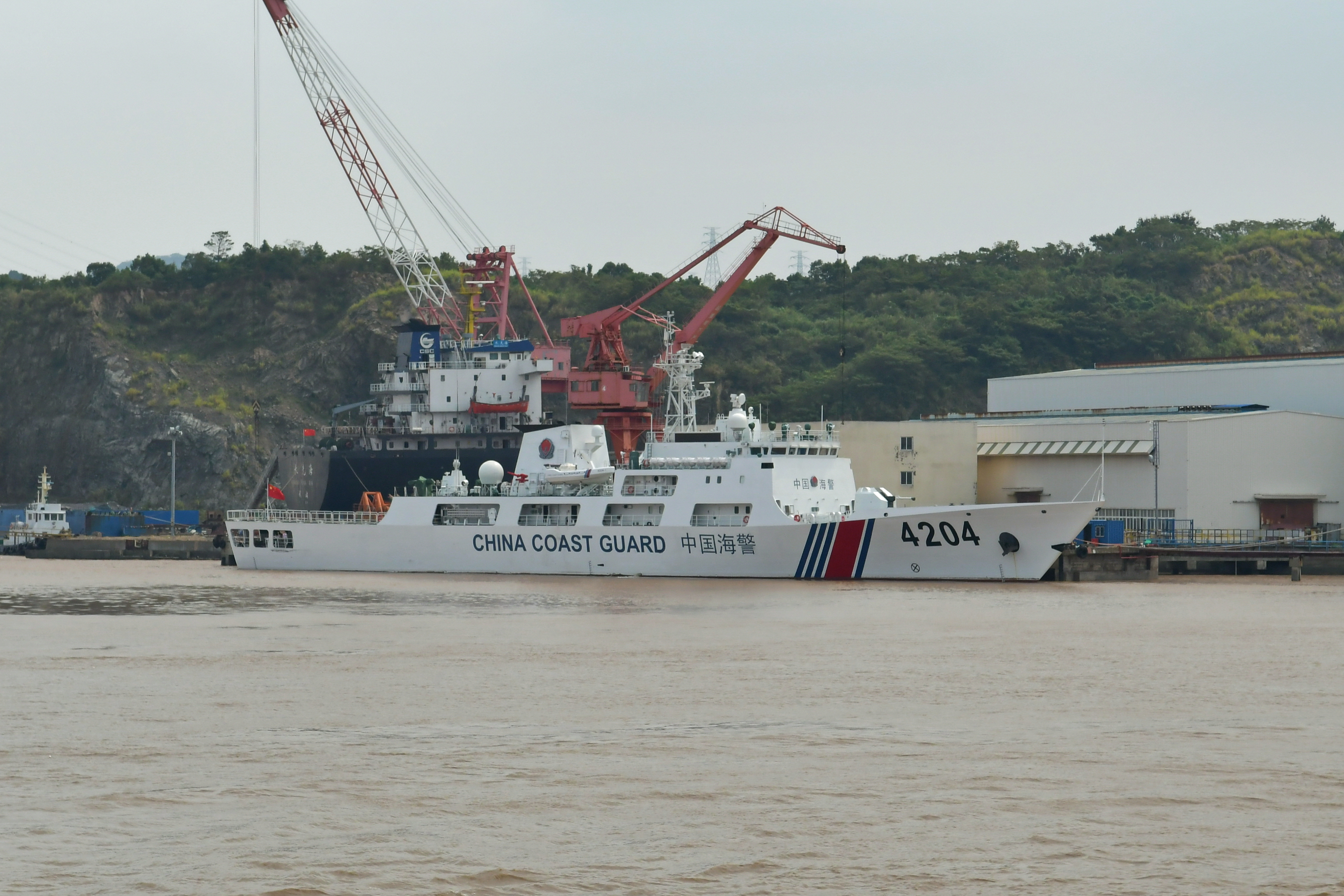
Zhaoshu (4204, later renumbered to 5205)

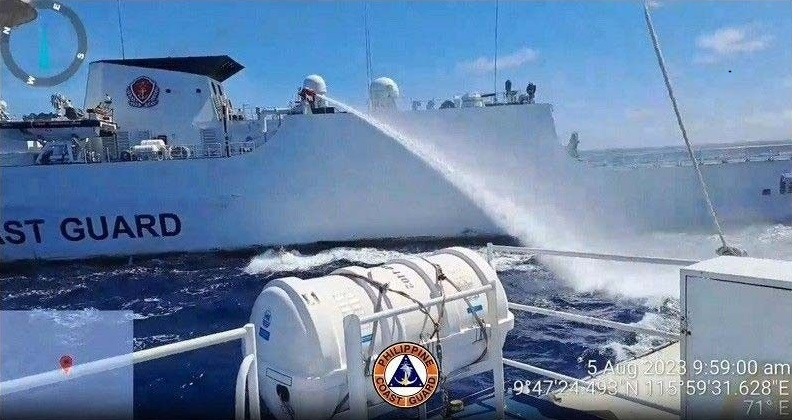
Haijing 5304 during the August 2023 Second Thomas Shoal standoff

| Ship class | NATO reporting name | Type | Ships | Quantity | Notes |
|---|---|---|---|---|---|
| | Dalang | Patrol ship | 3411 | 1 | Transferred from the PLAN |
| | Fuzi Mod | Auxiliary | | 1+ | |
| Type 056 | Jiangdao Mod | Patrol corvette | 1100-, 3100-, 4100-, 5100-, 6100-, 21000-series 1108, Feiyu (4103; 飞鱼), Nan'ao (21616; 南澳) | 22 | Transferred from the People's Liberation Army Navy (PLAN) in 2022 |
| Type 053H2G | Jiangwei I | Patrol frigate | Jintang (2201; 金塘), Dongtou (2202; 洞头), Yuhuan (2203; 玉环) | 3 | Transferred from the PLAN |
| | Haijian | Oceanographic research ship | 2101, 3172, 21601 | 4 | |
| Type 718 | Haixun II | Patrol ship | Huyu (1105; 虎屿) | 1 | |
| | Halin I | Patrol craft | 44056, 44057, 44058, 44059, 44060, 44068, 44069, 45066, 45067 | 9 | |
| | Halin II | Patrol craft | 11506, 14512, 21533 31088, 31504, 33068, 35089, 35090, 35097 | 9 | |
| | Hongda | Patrol craft | 35001, 44044, 46001, 46002 | 4+ | |
| | Hongming II | Patrol craft | 12014, 12021, 12302, 13013, 13022, 21016, 21040, 21520, 22804, 31021, 35011 | 11+ | |
| | Hongming III | Patrol craft | 12505, 13516, 21530, 23510, 31018, 32019, 33022, 37011, 37031, 33073, 44968, 45014, 45031 | 13+ | |
| | Hongshou | Patrol craft | 13504, 14507, 21407, 21512, 21513, 21614, 22802, 33012, 33042, 33043, 33052, 35061, 35091, 44017, 44043, 44052 | 16 | |
| | Hulai II | Patrol craft | 11509, 13073, 14515, 21545, 23511, 31515, 31516, 32507, 32508, 32509, 34522, 34525 | 30 | |
| | Hutao I | Patrol gunboat | 14609, 21105, Dongfeng (22602; 东风), 31103, 33104, 44106 | 6+ | |
| | Hutao III | Patrol gunboat | 3001, 3002 | 2 | |
| | Hutao IV | Patrol gunboat | 32515 | 1 | |
| | Kanjie | Patrol ship | 3501 | 1 | |
| | Kaobo | Auxiliary | 108, 201, 202, 203, 301, 302, 303 | 7 | |
| | Shaokao | Patrol boat | | 100+ | |
| | Shucha II | Patrol ship | Shengsi (1301; 嵊泗), 1302, 2301, 2302, Wanshan (3301; 万山), Chuanshan (3302; 川山), 5302, Anqiao (6302; 安桥), Shuangying (6303; 双鹰), 6304 | 10 | |
| | Shuke I | Patrol ship | 1127 | 1 | |
| 1,000 ton type II | Shuke II (Note: USN ONI 2024 labels the class "Shuke III") | Patrol ship | 1123, 1126, Hai'ou (3103; 海鸥), 14603 | 4 | |
| | Shuke III | Patrol ship | 1001, 1002, 1013, 2032, 2112, 2113, 2168, 2169, 3111, 3112, 3113, 4001, 4002, 4072, 46016 | 15 | |
| | Shuoshi II | Patrol ship | 2501, 2502, Huangyan (3502, 黄岩), Changshan (6501; 长山) | 4 | |
| | Shusheng | Patrol ship | 1010, 2115, 2166, 3015, 7008, 9068 | 6 | |
| | Shutu | Auxiliary | 3062, 3063 | 2 | |
| 1500 tonne class | Shuwu | Patrol ship | 1104, Hai'an (5103; 海安), Hongying (6103; 红鹰) | 3 | |
| 1000 tonne I class | Shuyou | Patrol ship | 1117, Yijiangshan (2102; 一江山), Anding (3102; 安定) | 3 | |
| | Shuzhou II | Patrol gunboat | 9012 | 1 | |
| | Shuzhou III | Patrol gunboat | 1015, 1116, 1117, 2030, 3011, 3012, 4067, 4073, 5030, 7018, 7028, 7038, 8003, 8027 | 14 | |
| | Tuzhong | Patrol ship | 2337, 3367, 6301 | 3 | |
| Type 618B-II | N/A | Patrol craft | Yonglong (11601; 永隆), 12101, 13102, 13601, 13602, 14502, 14604, 14606, 21101, 21102, 21103, 31102, 32102, 32601, 34604, 44101, 44103, 45101, 45102, 4001, 4002, 4003, 4004, 4005, 4006 | 25 | |
| Unknown | | Patrol ship | 2350 | | |
| | Wolei | Patrol ship | 6201 | 1 | |
| Type 210 | Yanbing | Icebreaker | 6401 | 1 | |
| | Yunsong | Auxiliary | 18602 | 1 | Transferred from the PLA |
| | Zhaochang I | Patrol ship | 1304 | 1 | |
| | Zhaodai | Patrol ship | 1102, 1103, 4101, 6102 | 4 | |
| Type 818 | Zhaoduan | Patrol ship | Meishan (2303; 梅山), Baita (2304; 白塔), Xiushan (2305; 秀山), Yongshu (5303, 永暑), Zhubi (5304), 渚碧), 5305 | 6 | Modification of Type 054A frigate |
| | Zhaogao | Patrol ship | 13603, 14608, 33601 | 3 | |
| ModifiedType 718 | Zhaojun | Patrol ship | Liuheng (2204; 六横), 4201, 4202, 4203, 5201, Dongmen (5202, 东门), 5203, Nanxun (5204, 南薰), Zhaoshu (5205, 赵述), | 10 | |
| | Zhaokai | Patrol ship | 1306, 3306, 4306 | 3+ | |
| | Zhaolai I | Patrol ship | Chongming (1401; 崇明), 5402, Tiexian (5403; 铁线), 6402 | 4 | |
| | Zhaolai II | Rescue and salvage ship/patrol ship | 2504 | 2 | |
| | Zhaoming | Patrol ship | 1116, 3101, 21603 | 3 | |
| | Zhaotim | Patrol ship | 2103, 2106, 3105, 3106, 5101, 5102, 6106, 6107, 14605, 31601, 45005, 45013, 45036 | 13 | |
| | Zhaotou | Patrol ship | Zhoushan (2901; 舟山), Nansha (5901; 南沙) | 2 | |
| | Zhaoyu I | Patrol ship | 13035023, 1305, 3303, Dahao (3304, 达濠), 3305, Xisha (4301, 西沙), 4302, 4303, Zhongjian (4304, 中建), 6305, 6306, 6307 | 12 | |
| | Zhongeng | Patrol ship | 13001, 21001, 32501, 33001, 3306, 25001, 37008, 44061, 45001, 46012 | 10 | |
| | Zhongke | Patrol gunboat | 1011, 21101, 21111, 33018, 33015, 37061, 45002 | 7+ | |
| | Zhongmel | Patrol gunboat | 44183, 44608 | 2 | |
| | Zhongpa | Patrol ship | 44002 | 1 | |
| | Zhongsui | Patrol craft | 35199, 44601, 44602, 44603, 44606, 45003, 45029 | 7 | |
| | Zhongtao | Patrol craft | | 40+ | |
| | Unknown | Patrol Boat | 21508, 21547 | | |
| | Zhongyu | Patrol ship | 31001 | 1 | |

== Retired ships ==
- Haijing 3210 - Renamed to Chinese cutter Sanshazonghezhifa 1 and reassigned to Sansha Chengguan in 2015

== See also ==
- List of ships of the People's Liberation Army Navy
