= Timeline of the South China Sea dispute =

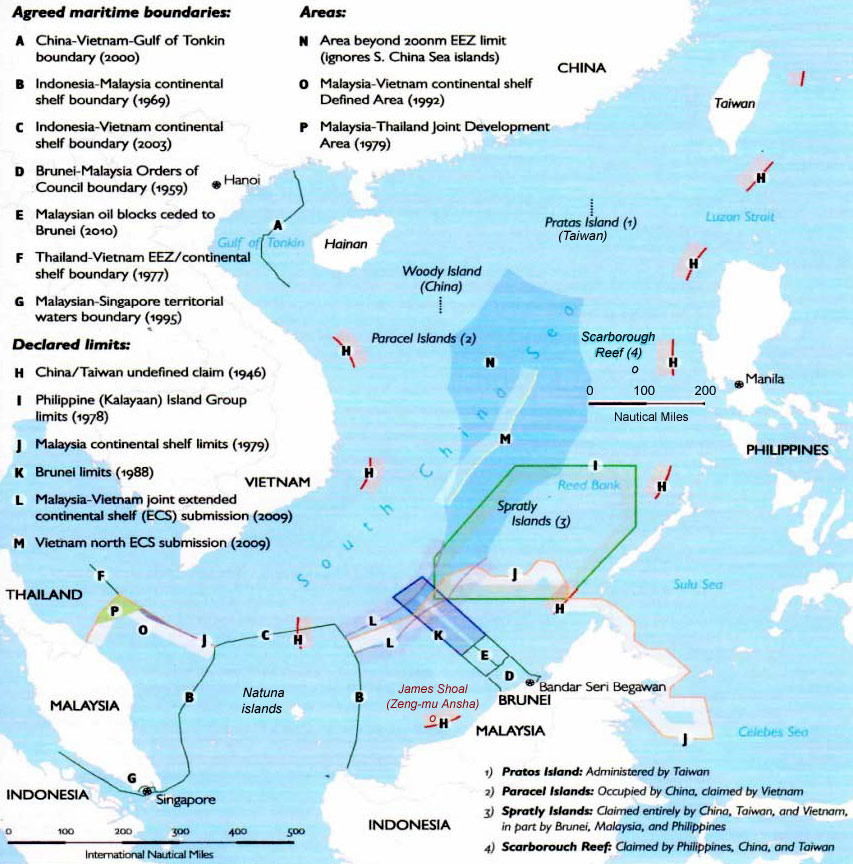
South China Sea claims and agreements.

This timeline covers events relevant to the ongoing territorial disputes in the South China Sea.

== 3rd century BCE ==
It has been claimed by the People's Republic of China that since 200 BCE Chinese fishermen have used the Spratly islands.

== 3rd–13th centuries ==
Chinese author Wan Zhen of the Eastern Wu dynasty (222–280 CE) and a work titled Guangzhou Ji (Chronicles of Guangzhou) authored by Pei Yuan of the Jin dynasty (266–420 CE) described some southern islands, mainly Hainan. The local government exercised jurisdiction over Hainan by sending patrolling naval boats.

Naval forces of the Liu Song dynasty (420–479 CE) patrolled the southernmost island of Hainan. In the Tang dynasty (618–907 CE), Hainan was placed under the administration and authority of the Qiongzhou Prefecture (now Hainan Province). The Chinese administration of the South China Sea continued into the Song dynasty (960–1279 CE).

The archaeological record of the South China Sea islands indicates occupation by a variety of cultures over the past 1500 years, suggesting that no nation had consistent sovereignty over the high seas at these times and that trade among the many polities of the region occurred. Evidence includes Chinese-made pottery, porcelain and other historical relics from the Southern dynasties (420–589 CE), the Sui dynasty (581–619 CE), the Tang dynasty, the Song dynasty, the Yuan dynasty (1271–1368 CE), the Ming dynasty (1368–1644 CE), along with Austronesian materials, including by peoples from the Philippines, Indonesia, and others of the region.

== 18th century ==
Velarde map

- 1734 – The Spanish colonial government published the first edition of the Velarde map. According to the Philippines, this map shows the territories of the Philippines including actual sovereignty over the Scarborough Shoal (called Panacot in the map) and the Spratly Islands (referred as Los Bajos de Paragua) and is the earliest map showing sovereignty over the said territories.
- 1792 - The Spanish colonial government of the territory of the Philippines launched the first ever survey of Scarborough Shoal on 4 May 1792. The survey, Plano de la Navigacion, was taken by Alessandro Malaspina aboard the Sta. Lucia, with other Filipinos.

== 19th century ==
- 1802 – Annamese emperor Gia Long creates the "Dio Hoang Sa" (Company of the Paracels).
- 1816 – Gia Long orders a mapping survey of the Paracel Islands. The Annamese emperor never claimed any islands aside from the Paracels, where the Annamese flag was planted on Pattle Island.
- 1830 – The first maps are published by the Annamese kingdom under Emperor Minh Mạng that include "Thruong Sa" (Spratly) Islands as part of its territory.
- 1835 – Annam erects a pagoda in the Paracel Islands
- 1836 – Annam erects ten 5-metre steles with inscriptions claiming the Paracels.
- 1875 – According to the Philippines, the Spanish colonial government published the 1875 edition of the Carita General del Archipelago Filipino, showing the sovereign territory of the Philippines, which included Scarborough Shoal and the Spratly islands.
- 1876 – Guo Song Tao, China's ambassador to Europe, makes an unofficial claim to "Bailasu Dao" (the phonetic translation of the Paracel Island).
- 1883 – During a German survey of the Spratlys and Paracels, China issues protests.
- 9 June 1885 – The Treaty of Tientsin, signed on 9 June 1885, officially ended the Sino-French War. The unequal treaty restated in greater detail the main provisions of the Tientsin Accord, signed between France and China on 11 May 1884. As Article 2 required China to recognise the French protectorate over Annam and Tonkin established by the Treaty of Hue in June 1884, implicitly abandoning China's own claims to suzerainty over Vietnam, the treaty formalised France's victory in the Sino-French War.
- 1885 – Chinese officials declare its rights to the Paracels.
- 1887 – In the 19th century, Europeans found that Chinese fishermen from Hainan annually visited the Spratly islands for part of the year, while in 1877 it was the British who launched the first modern legal claims to the Spratlys.
- 1887 – The Chinese–Vietnamese Boundary Convention (formally, the Convention Respecting the Delimitation of the Frontier Between China and Tonkin) between France and the Qing Empire set the land boundary between Tonkin and China and sovereignty of a few small islands in the Gulf of Tonkin. Some scholars, especially Chinese ones, try to argue that the 1887 convention recognised a Chinese claim over the Spratly and Paracel islands, because France relinquished its claims. This was disputed due to the fact that the 1887 convention set the coastal boundary in the Gulf of Tonkin, but did not state that China was the owner of the Spratly and Paracel islands, as these islands are not in the Gulf of Tonkin, but were associated with the realm of Annam in central Vietnam by France.
- 1898 – After the Spanish-American War, the Philippines were ceded by Spain to the United States in the Treaty of Paris. The treaty lines described in the treaty lacked precision, leading to the Spanish to retain sovereign control over the Spratly Islands, Scarborough Shoal, and parts of Tawi-Tawi. According to Filipino officials and commentators, this was later rectified in the 1900 Treaty of Washington, where the mentioned territories were formally ceded to the United States as part of the territory of the Philippines.
- 12 April 1898 – France seized the Chinese city of Guangzhouwan as a treaty port and quickly placed the city under the effective authority of the French Resident Superior in Tonkin (itself under the Governor General of French Indochina, also in Hanoi).
- 1900 - The Treaty of Washington was signed on November 7, 1900, and came into effect on March 23, 1901, when the ratifications were exchanged. Before the treaty was signed, the territories of the Scarborough Shoal, the Spratly Islands, and parts of Tawi-Tawi continued to be under Spanish sovereignty due to the 1898 Treaty of Paris. The 1900 Washington Treaty added that "all islands belonging to the Philippine Archipelago, lying outside the lines described in Article III of [the 1898 Treaty of Paris] and particularly to the islands of Cagayan [Mapun], Sulu and Sibutu" were to be part of the formal cession by Spain to the United States. According to the Philippines, this included the Scarborough Shoal, the Spratly Islands, and the remaining parts of Tawi-Tawi within the country's sovereign territory.

== 1901–1937 ==
- 1902 – China sends naval forces on inspection tours of the Paracel Islands to preempt French claims. Scholar François-Xavier Bonnet argued that per Chinese records, these expeditions never occurred and were backdated during the 1970s.
- 1907 – China sends another naval force, this time to plan for resource exploitation.
- 1909 – China reacted to Japanese interest in exploiting guano in the Paracel Islands by mapping them and stationing Chinese Navy personnel on them.
- 1912 – The newly formed Republic of China, successor state to the Qing dynasty, moves administration of the Paracel Islands to Hainan.
- 1917 – Japanese exploited phosphate deposits (guano) in the main Spratly island, Itu Aba. It was noted by Japan in July 1938 to the France's ambassador in Tokyo who was recalling the earlier annexation of the Spratlys by France.
- 1928 - According to Filipino judge Antonio Carpio, during the Island of Palmas case, the United States representing the territory of the Philippines reiterated in a memorandum that the 1875 Carta General del Archipielago Filipino "is both an American official and a Spanish official map" of Philippine territory, binding the United States on its recognition of the Scarborough Shoal and the Spratly Islands as Philippine territory.
- 1932 - France occupied the Paracels for the French Union. China sent a note verbale to France stating that the Paracels were the "southernmost" territory of China.
- 1933 - France claimed six islands in the Spratlys for the French Union. China did not protest the claim as it considered the Paracels as its southernmost territory through a 1932 note verbale sent by China to France.
- 1935 - The Philippines adopted the 1935 Philippine Constitution, which reiterates the territory of the Philippines as per the 1898 Treaty of Paris, the 1900 Treaty of Washington, and the 1930 US-UK Treaty to include Scarborough Shoal and the Spratly Islands.
- June 1937 – China sends Huang Qiang, the chief of Chinese military region No. 9 on a secret tour to four islands in the Amphitrite Group of the Paracels. His boat was loaded with 30 backdated sovereignty markers. Because the mission was confidential, Huang Qiang carried no markers dated to 1937. The team buried a total of 12 backdated sovereignty markers, including some actual old markers dating from the Qing dynasty, bearing the date 1902, which were gathered in the city of Guangdong.
- 1938 - Secretary Cordell Hull of the US State Department issued a Memorandum on 27 July 1938 to Harry Woodring, Secretary of War, stating that Scarborough Shoal "should be regarded as included among the islands ceded to the United States by the American-Treaty of November 7, 1900," referring to the 1900 Treaty of Washington.

== World War II ==
- 30 March 1939 – Japan invades the Spratly Islands and renames these to “Shinnan Shoto”. The islands are placed under the Japanese administration in Taiwan.
- 4 April 1939 – Japan invades the Paracels Islands, due to the ongoing Sino-Japanese War. The islands are placed under a Japanese protectorate.
- 1941 – Japan places the Paracels under the administration of Japanese Taiwan.
- 1943 - China published its "China Handbook (1937-1943)" about the country's situation during the Second Sino-Japanese War. It called "Triton Island of the Paracel Group" the southernmost territory of China.
- 2 July 1945 – Woody Island surrendered to the USS Cabrilla submarine after having been attacked by US forces on 6 February and 8 March. The French tricolour and a white flag were both flying when the US crew arrived.
- 20 November 1945 – A US Navy reconnaissance mission landed on Itu Aba and found that the Japanese forces had already pulled out.

== 1945–1959 ==
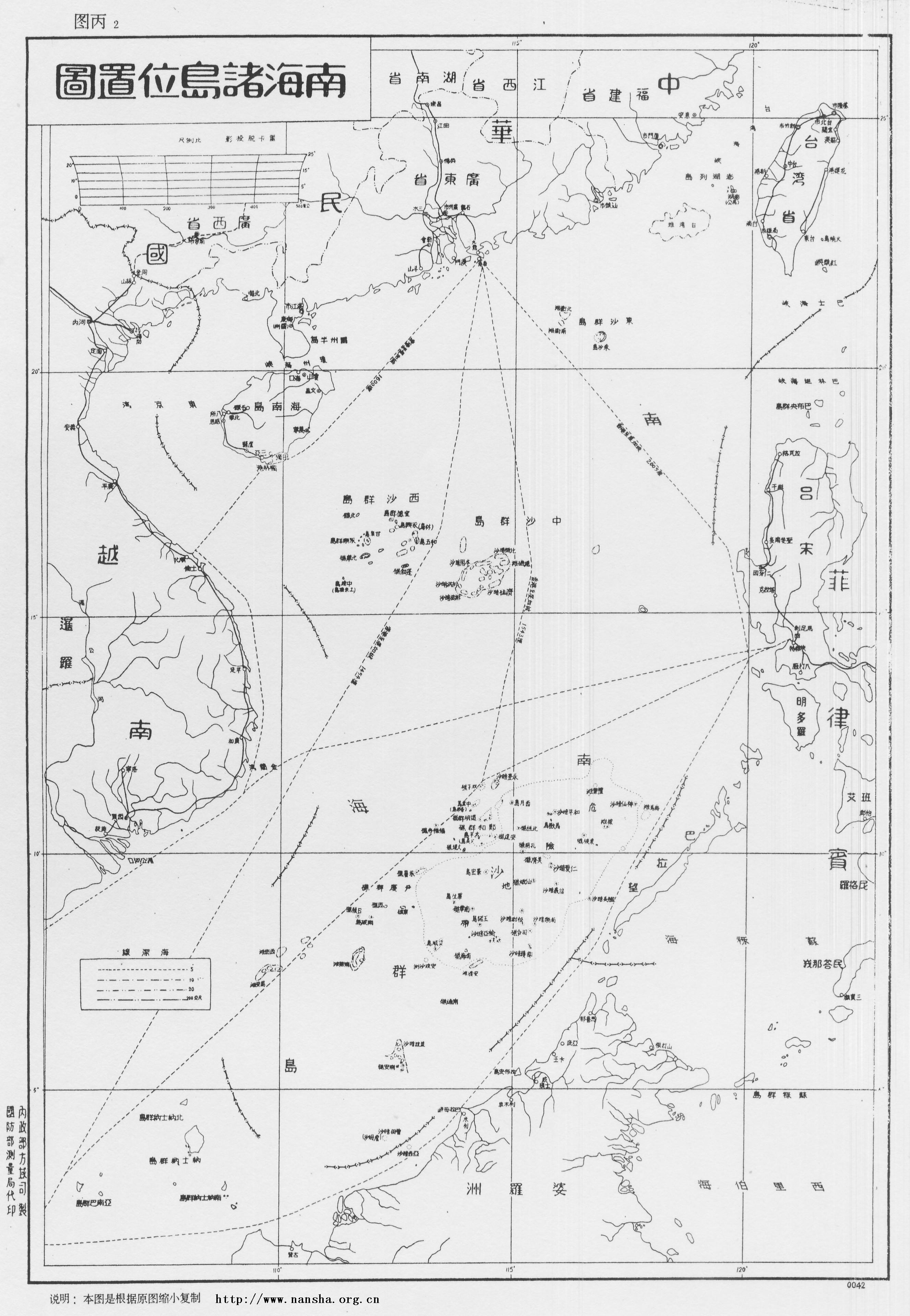
China 1947 map

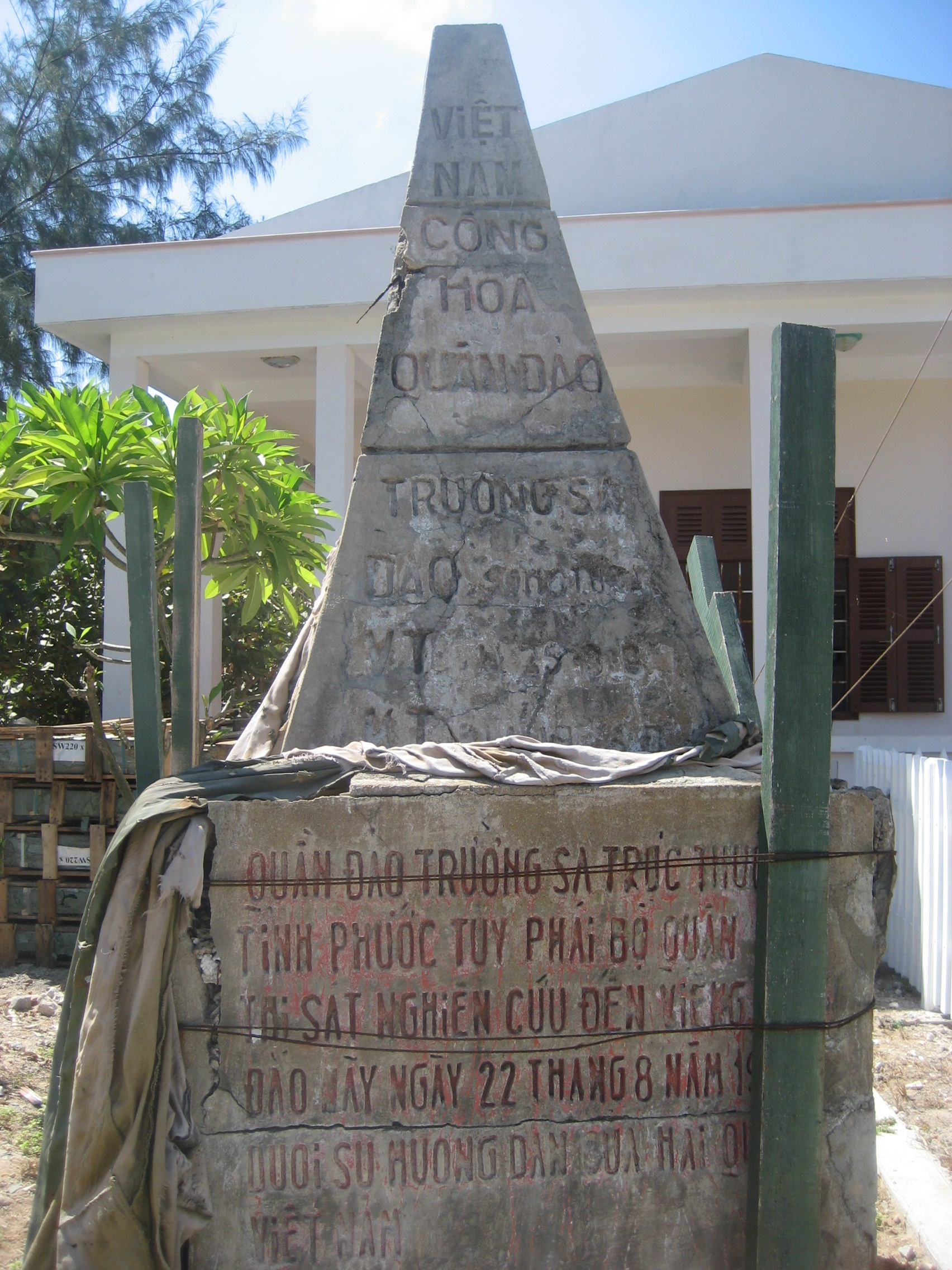
Territorial monument of the Republic of Vietnam (South Vietnam) on Southwest Cay, Spratly Islands, defining the cay as part of Vietnamese territory (to Phước Tuy Province). Used since 22 August 1956 until 1975, when replaced by another one from the Socialist Republic of Vietnam (successor state after the Fall of Saigon)

- 1945 – In accordance with the Cairo and Potsdam Declarations and with American help, the armed forces of the Republic of China government at Nanjing accepted the surrender of the Japanese garrisons in Taiwan, including the Paracel and Spratly Islands. Nanjing then declared both archipelagoes to be part of Guangdong Province.
- 1946 – The ROC established garrisons on both Woody (now Yongxing / 永兴) Island in the Paracels and Taiping Island in the Spratlys. France protested. It tried but failed to dislodge Chinese nationalist troops from Yongxing Island/Woody Island (the only habitable island in the Paracels), but were able to establish a small camp on Pattle (now Shanhu / 珊瑚) Island in the southwestern part of the archipelago. The Republic of China drew up The Southern China Sea Islands Location Map, marking the sea with 11 lines in 1947. The Americans discouraged the Philippines in its claim to the Spratlys to avoid tensions with China. The Spratly was outside the treaty lines made in the 1898 Treaty of Paris, However, the supplemental 1900 Treaty of Washington modified that to include to any and all islands belonging to the Philippine Archipelago lying outside those lines, and former Philippine Supreme Court justice Antonio Carpio has asserted that this includes the Spratlys.
- 1947 - China published a revised China Handbook. This claimed the Spratlys while specifically recognizing that the islands are contested among China, the Philippines, and French Indochina.
- 1951 - During the San Francisco Peace Conference of 1951, the San Francisco Peace Treaty was signed. In the conference, the USSR motioned for the Paracels and the Spratly to be awarded to China, but the motion was rejected by a vote of 46 to 3, with one abstention.
- 1952 – Japan renounced any claims of sovereignty over the Spratly and Paracel archipelagos in accordance with Article 2 Clause (f) of the San Francisco Peace Treaty, but no beneficiary was designated.
- 1953 - The French Foreign Ministry clarified that the Spratlys were not attached to Vietnam in 1949, when the former colony of Conchinchina was ceded to the Associated State. France stated that it administered the islands through the Ministry of Overseas France.
- 1954 – The Geneva Accords, which China was a signatory, settled the First Indochina War end. French Indochina was split into three countries: Laos, Cambodia, and Vietnam. Vietnam was to be temporarily divided along the 17th Parallel. Chapter I, Article 4 say: "The provisional military demarcation line between the two final regrouping zones is extended into the territorial waters by a line perpendicular to the general line of the coast. All coastal islands north of this boundary shall be evacuated by the armed forces of the French Union, and all islands south of it shall be evacuated by the forces of the People's Army of Viet-Nam."
- 1955 - The French Foreign Ministry reiterated its previous 1949 statement through legal diplomatic note, stating that "beyond doubt that the Spratlys belonged to the French Union, not Vietnam." On 26 October 1955, the Republic of Vietnam "South Vietnam" replaced the State of Vietnam (part of the French Union) and inherit of its rights. Nothing was said explicitly about offshore archipelagos. Arguably it was understood that the Republic of Vietnam (South Vietnam) inherited of all French Indochina's Vietnamese territories below the 17th Parallel.
- 1956 – North Vietnam Communist government formally accepted that the Paracel and Spratly islands were historically Chinese. The PLA reestablished a Chinese garrison on Yongxing Island in the Paracels, while the Republic of China (Taipei) put troops back on Taiping Island in the Spratlys. Contrarily, South Vietnam announced that it had annexed the Paracel archipelago as well as the Spratlys and reopened the abandoned French camp on Shanhu Island.
- 1956 – Filemon and Tomás Cloma took possession of some features in the Spratly Islands and declared them as part of the Free Territory of Freedomland. Their action was stopped by the armed forces of the Republic of China (Taiwan), which destroyed and confiscated Freedomland properties and resumed its garrison of Itu Aba. The Philippine government disavowed any participation in the Cloma expeditions but left room for future claims by describing the islands as terra nullis open to appropriation by any party.
- 16 January 1957 – China transferred Bạch Long Vĩ Island to Vietnam.
- 1958 - North Vietnam's Phạm Văn Đồng recognizes Chinese sovereignty over the Paracels.

== 1970s ==
- 1969 – A UN sponsored research team discovers oil under the sea floor of the island group.
- 1970 – China occupies Amphitrite Group of the Paracel Islands.
- 1971 – Philippines announces claim to islands adjacent to its territory in the Spratlys, which they named Kalayaan, which was formally incorporated into Palawan Province in 1972. The Philippines President Marcos announced the claims after Taiwanese troops attacked and shot at a Philippine fishing boat on Itu Aba.
- 1972 – Bureau of Survey and Cartography under the Office of the Premier of Vietnam printed out "The World Atlas", saying that the "chain of islands from the Nansha and Xisha Islands to Hainan Island, Taiwan Island, the Penghu Islands and the Zhoushan Islands ... are shaped like a bow and constitute a Great Wall defending the China mainland."
- 1974 – South Vietnam attempted to enforce its claims to sovereignty by placing settlers in the Spratlys and expelling Chinese fishermen from the southwestern Paracels. In the ensuing Battle of the Paracel Islands, China defeated Vietnamese forces. China ousts South Vietnamese forces from the Crescent Group, enabling Beijing to extend its control to the entire Paracel archipelago. The "Operation Tran Hung Dao 48" was a campaign conducted by the Republic of Vietnam Navy from 30 January 1974 to station troops on unoccupied islands to assert Vietnam's sovereignty over the Spratly archipelago after the Battle of the Paracel Islands.
- 14 February 1975, regretting the agreement with China in 1956, the Communist Vietnamese government reclaims the Spratly and Paracel archipelagos.
- 1976 – Vietnam tried to persuade China to recognize Vietnam's sovereignty over the Spratly Islands in exchange for Hanoi's recognition of Beijing's claim over the Paracel Islands. After the effort failed, the Vietnamese government asserted claim over both island groups.
- June 1977 - During June 1977 discussions with China's Li Xiannan during a time of rising tensions between China and Vietnam, Phạm Văn Đồng recedes from Vietnam's 1958 recognition of China's sovereignty over the Paracels, contending that recognition was only made under the pressure of the United States of America's war against Vietnam.
- 11 June 1978 – President Ferdinand Marcos, by virtue of the Presidential Decree No. 1596, asserted that islands designated as the Kalayaan Island Group and comprising most of the Spratly Islands are subject to the sovereignty of the Philippines, and by virtue of the Presidential Decree No. 1599 issued on 11 June 1978 claimed an Exclusive Economic Zone (EEZ) up to 200 nautical miles (370 km) from the baselines from which their territorial sea is measured.
- 1979 – Hanoi (now the capital of a united Vietnam) adopted South Vietnam's position, and claimed sovereignty over all the islands in the South China Sea. In the early 1980s, as Beijing, Kuala Lumpur, Manila, and Taipei protested, Vietnam resumed vigorous settlement and garrisoning of the Spratlys.

== 1980s ==
- 8 May 1984 – the Philippines ratified the 1982 Third United Nations Convention on the Law of the Sea (UNCLOS III) and declared themselves an archipelagic state. The Philippines claimed all the Spratly islands and reefs lying within its 200 Nautical mile Exclusive Economic Zone including Mabini (Johnson South Reef).
- 1984 – China starts to add ten dashes to its official maps of sea areas claimed, with the extra dash north east of Taiwan.
- 1985 – President Meads of the Kingdom of Humanity sued the United States and others for $25 billion, claiming "unfair competition, harassment, [and] sabotage." The case was not heard.
- In 1987, following a United Nations Educational, Scientific and Cultural Organization/Intergovernmental Oceanographic Commission (UNESCO/IOC) meeting in March, it was agreed that the PRC would build weather stations in the South China sea as part of the Global Sea Level Observing System (GLOSS) survey. The scientists from GLOSS agreed that China would install tide gauges on what the PRC considered to be its coasts in the East China Sea and on the "Nansha islands" in South China Sea.
- 14 March 1988 – China defeats the Vietnamese navy in the Johnson South Reef Skirmish on Mabini reef (Johnson South Reef), after the Vietnamese tried to intercept a Chinese force commissioned by UNESCO to build a tidal gauge station. After defeating the Vietnamese forces, China gains control of six significant landmarks including Johnson South Reef.

== 1990s ==
- 1992 – The Chinese government signs an oil exploration contract with Crestone.
- 1992 – Vietnam accuses China of landing troops on Da Lat Reef. China seizes almost 20 Vietnamese cargo ships transporting goods from Hong Kong from June - September.
- 1994 – Two Chinese warships blockade a Vietnamese oil rig built earlier this year in Wan'an Bei block off the coast of southern Vietnam. The Vietnamese claim was being developed by a consortium of foreign oil companies led by Mobil in the same area where China had awarded drilling rights to the Crestone Energy Corporation of Denver.
- 1995 – A Vietnamese ship was shot by Taiwan.
- 1997 – Philippines begins to challenge Chinese sovereignty over the Scarborough Shoal.
- 1999 – Under President Lee Teng-hui, Taiwan stated that "legally, historically, geographically, or in reality", all of the South China Sea and Spratly islands were Taiwan's territory and under Taiwanese sovereignty, and denounced actions undertaken there by Malaysia and the Philippines, in a statement on 13 July 1999 released by the foreign ministry of Taiwan. Taiwan and China's claims "mirrors" each other. During international talks involving the Spratly islands, China and Taiwan have cooperated with each other since both have the same claims.
- 9 May 1999 – The day after the U.S. bombing of the Chinese embassy in Belgrade, Philippine navy sent BRP Sierra Madre and ran her aground on Second Thomas Shoal. China issued official protest afterward. Philippine refused to withdraw the ship.

== 21st century ==
=== 2002 ===
- ASEAN and China agreed to a code of conduct in the Declaration on the Conduct of Parties in the South China Sea

=== 2005 ===
- 8 January – Chinese ships fired upon two Vietnamese fishing boats from Thanh Hóa Province, killing 9 people and detaining one ship with 8 people on Hainan Island. Chinese Foreign Ministry claim they were pirates that opened fire first and obtained confession from the arrested members.

=== 2006 ===
- The captain of a Taiwanese fishing boat was shot dead and a crewman wounded when their boat was reportedly attacked by pirates wearing military uniforms. Philippine authorities assured the Taiwan Ministry of Foreign Affairs that no Filipino naval or coast guard personnel were involved in the incident. The incident occurred in the Bashi Channel which is adjacent to the South China Sea.

=== 2008 ===
- 23 May 2008 – The International Court of Justice, determined that Middle Rocks at the southwestern edge of the Sea belongs to Malaysia.

=== 2009 ===
- March 2009 – The Pentagon reported that Chinese ships harassed a US surveillance ship. According to the report, five Chinese vessels "shadowed and aggressively maneuvered in dangerously close proximity to USNS Impeccable, in an apparent coordinated effort to harass the U.S. ocean surveillance ship while it was conducting routine operations in international waters." The crew members aboard the vessels, two of which were within 50 feet, waved Chinese flags and told the US ship to leave the area, the statement said.
- 13 May 2009 – The deadline for states to make seabed hydrocarbon claims under the United Nations Convention on the Law of the Sea. This is suspected to have caused ancient island claims to surface and become inflamed.

=== 2010 ===
- 23 July – US Secretary of State Hillary Clinton stated that the South China Sea was a matter of U.S. national interest.

=== 2011 ===
- 25 February – The Chinese frigate Dongguan fired three shots at Philippine fishing boats in the vicinity of Jackson atoll. The shots were fired after the frigate instructed the fishing boats to leave, and one of those boats experienced trouble removing its anchor.
- 26 May – The clash involved the Vietnamese Binh Minh 02 oil and gas survey ship and three Chinese maritime patrol vessels occurred 120 km (80 miles) off the south-central coast of Vietnam and some 600 km south of China's Hainan island. Vietnam says the Chinese boats deliberately cut the survey ship's cables in Vietnamese waters. China denies the allegation. The event stirred up unprecedented anti-China protests in Hanoi and Ho Chi Minh city.
- 9 June – A Norwegian-flagged seismic conducting ship hired by Vietnam Oil & Gas Corporation (PetroVietnam) clashed with another three Chinese fishery patrol vessels within Vietnam's Exclusive Economic Zone. Vietnam once again claimed its exploration cables were deliberately cut.
- 22 July – The INS Airavat, an Indian amphibious assault vessel on a friendly visit to Vietnam, was reportedly contacted 45 nautical miles from the Vietnamese coast in the disputed South China Sea by a party identifying itself as the PLA Navy and stating that the ship was entering PRC waters. A spokesperson for the Indian Navy explained that as no ship or aircraft was visible, the INS Airavat proceeded on her onward journey as scheduled. The Indian Navy further clarified that "[t]here was no confrontation involving the INS Airavat. India supports freedom of navigation in international waters, including in the South China Sea, and the right of passage in accordance with accepted principles of international law. These principles should be respected by all."
- 10 October – Vietnam and China agree to a new set of principles on settling maritime disputes
- November – Former Malaysian Prime Minister Mahathir Mohamad stated that China was not a threat to anyone and was not worried about aggression from China, accusing the United States of provoking China and trying to turn China's neighbours against China.

=== 2012 ===
- April – The Philippine warship Gregorio del Pilar was involved in a standoff with two Chinese surveillance vessels in the Scarborough Shoal, an area claimed by both nations. The Philippine navy had been trying to arrest Chinese fishermen who were allegedly taking government-protected marine species from the area, but the surveillance boats prevented them.
- 16 April – The Chinese Foreign Ministry urged a Philippine archaeological ship to immediately leave the waters of the Scarborough Shoal, which China claims is an "integral part of its territory."
- 7 May – Chinese Vice Foreign Minister Fu Ying called a meeting with Alex Chua, Chargé d'affaires of the Philippine Embassy in China, to make a serious representation over the current incident at the Scarborough Shoal. China also warned its nationals against travel to the Philippines and raised trade barriers on imported pineapples and bananas.
- 16 May – A fishing ban in the Scarborough Shoal by the governments of China and the Philippines became effective. By mid June 2012, both nations had withdrawn their vessels from the waters around the disputed Shoal due to the arrival of the typhoon season. By July 2012, China had erected a barrier to the entrance of the shoal, and that vessels belonging to Beijing's China Marine Surveillance and Fisheries Law Enforcement Command were observed nearby the disputed shoal; as of December 2012, Chinese government ships remain around the shoal and have been turning away Filipino vessels; additionally, China has stated it would interdict, and board, any foreign vessel that entered waters it claimed. China later clarified that it would only conduct interdiction, and boarding, vessels within 12 nautical miles for which China has announced baselines.
- May – Taiwan said co-ordinating with the PRC in the South China Sea disputes was impossible at the moment.
- June – Indian Navy vessels sailing in the South China Sea received an unscheduled escort by a People's Liberation Army Navy frigate for 12 hours.
- 11 July – a Jianghu-V type frigate of the PLA Navy, 560 Dongguan, ran aground on Half Moon Shoal just 60 nmi west of Rizal, well within the Philippines' 200 nmi-EEZ. By 15 July the ship had been refloated and was returning to port with no injuries and only minor damage. The 2012 ASEAN summit was taking place in Phnom Penh, Cambodia at the same time, where the mood was already tense over the escalating aggression in the region.
- July – The National Assembly of Vietnam passed a law demarcating Vietnamese sea borders to include the Spratly and Paracel islands.
- July – Citing reports from diplomats on-hand, Reuters wrote that Cambodia "batted away repeated attempts to raise the issue about the disputed waters during the ASEAN Meeting last week as well as the ASEAN Regional Forum."
- 22 July – The Central Military Commission (China) decided to establish the Sansha garrison. The move was criticised by the Philippines and Vietnam. China responded by calling in a senior US diplomat and reiterating their "absolute sovereignty" over the region.
- August – Vietnam is believed to have begun land reclamation at West Reef.
- 1 September – ROC completed the 7-month construction of an antenna tower and runway on Taiping island, allowing the island to accommodate various kinds of military aircraft. Taiwan then performed live fire military exercises on Taiping island in September 2012, reports said that Vietnam was explicitly named by the Taiwanese military as the "imaginary enemy" in the drill. Vietnam protested against the exercises as violation of its territory and "voiced anger", demanding that Taiwan stop the drill. Taiwan rejected Vietnam's protests, and Taiwan's Department of East Asian and Pacific Affairs declared that "Taiping Island is part of the Republic of China's territory....We have noted Vietnam's dissatisfaction over the drill...No one has the right to protest over Taiwan's exercise of its sovereign rights there", while China voiced its approval and support of Taiwan's military drill on the island. Taiwan's Ministry of Foreign Affairs also said, "Our sovereignty over the island is undisputable and all of our activities and deployments on the island are legal and will never cause regional tensions." in response to Vietnamese claims on the island. Among the inspectors of the live fire drill were Taiwanese national legislators, adding to the tensions.
- 5 September – Philippine president Aquino promulgated Administrative Order No. 29, naming maritime areas on the western side of the Philippine archipelago as the West Philippine Sea. The order declares that the Philippines exercises "sovereign jurisdiction" in its exclusive economic zone, an area declared by Presidential Decree No. 1599 of 11 June 1978 to extend to a distance of two hundred nautical miles beyond and from the baseline from which the territorial sea is measured. The Philippine Baselines are defined by Republic Act No. 3046, as amended.
- 23 September – China launched a program to increase the number of UAVs monitoring the Scarborough Shoal, Paracel Islands, Spratly Islands and East China Sea, which follows a national marine zoning program approved by the State Council during the previous year as a part of China's 12th five year plan.
- December – In an interview with the Times of India, Philippines Vice-president Binay welcomed the statement made by Indian Navy Admiral Joshi who stated that the Indian Navy is prepared to operate in the South China Sea.

=== 2013 ===
- March – Malaysia displayed no concern over China conducting a military exercise at James Shoal in March 2013.
- August – Malaysia suggested that it might work with China over their South China Sea claims and ignore the other claimants, with Malaysian Defence Minister Hishamuddin Hussein saying that Malaysia had no problem with China patrolling the South China Sea, and telling ASEAN, America, and Japan that "Just because you have enemies, doesn't mean your enemies are my enemies".

=== 2014 ===
- In the spring, China and Vietnam clashed over the Hai Yang Shi You 981 oil rig near the Paracel islands. The incident caused several injuries and ships damaged or sunk.
- 10 January – China imposes a "fishing permit" rule in the South China Sea, over the objections of the United States, the Philippines, and Vietnam.
- 11 March – Two Philippine ships are expelled by the Chinese Coast Guard from Ayungin Shoal in the Spratly group of islands.
- 30 March – The Republic of the Philippines invokes the compulsory settlement of dispute clause under the Law of the Sea Convention, by submitting a case to the Permanent Court of Arbitration in The Hague in its case against China over competing South China Sea claims.
- 2 May – Vietnamese naval ships and Chinese vessels collide in the South China Sea. The incident occurred as China set up an oil rig in an area to which both nations lay claim. On 26 May, a Vietnamese fishing boat sank near the oil rig, after colliding with a Chinese vessel. As both sides imputed the blame to each other, Vietnam released video footage a week later, showing the Vietnamese boat being rammed by the Chinese vessel before sinking. Meanwhile, ASEAN leaders expressed "serious concerns" over the tensions, calling for self-restraint and peaceful acts from both sides. Many observed that this marked a change in tone by ASEAN members, who had previously avoided a collision of their economic interests with China.

=== 2015 ===
- Beginning in 2015, China's People's Liberation Army Air Force began patrolling the South China Sea, including the disputed Paracel and Spratly Islands. In China's view, these disputed areas are within its Air Defense Identification Zone (ADIZ). The United States Air Force does not accept this view, and flies its military planes through the area without informing China.
- 19 February – Upgrades and land reclamation were performed at Vietnamese-controlled Sand Cay between August 2011 and February 2015
- 8 April – China has been transforming Mischief Reef into an island since January. According to UNCLOS, artificial islands do not afford the occupying nation territorial waters.
- 8 June – Chinese coast guard vessel anchored at Luconia Shoals (Betting Patinggi Ali), leading to a protest by Malaysia.
- 7 July – Philippines v. China is a pending arbitration case concerning the legality of China's "nine-dotted line" claim over the South China Sea under the United Nations Convention on the Law of the Sea (UNCLOS). The Philippines asked a tribunal of Permanent Court of Arbitration to invalidate China's claims. The hearings were also attended by observers from Indonesia, Japan, Malaysia, Thailand and Vietnam. The case has been compared to Nicaragua v. United States due to similarities of the parties involved such as that a developing country is challenging a permanent member of the United Nations Security Council in an arbitral tribunal.
- 15 August – Malaysia continues its protest as China did not move their vessel by sending diplomatic notes. In a statement by the Minister in the Prime Minister's Department Shahidan Kassim, "We have never received any official claims from them (China) and they said the island (Beting Patinggi Ali) belongs to them but the country is 400,000 kilometres away. We are taking diplomatic action but in whatever approach, they have to get out of our national waters".
- 27 October – US destroyer USS Lassen navigates within 12 nautical miles of the emerging land masses in the Spratly Islands as the first in a series of "Freedom of Navigation Operation".
- 29 October – The tribunal ruled that it had the power to hear the case. It agreed to take up seven of the 15 submissions made by Manila, in particular whether Scarborough Shoal and low-tide areas like Mischief Reef can be considered islands. It set aside seven more claims mainly accusing Beijing of acting unlawfully to be considered at the next hearing on the case's merits. The tribunal is due to report in 2016.
- 14 November – Indonesia announces that it is planning to take China to court over the Natuna Islands.

=== 2016 ===
- 3 January – Vietnamese Foreign Ministry spokesperson Le Hai Binh said that the landing of a civilian aircraft in Fiery Cross Reef is "a serious infringement of the sovereignty of Vietnam on the Spratly archipelago".
- 13 January – China has finished construction on a 10,000-ton cutter destined for patrols in the South China Sea.
- 13 February – Satellite images shows that China is currently expanding the North Island and Tree Island, both part of the Paracel Islands. Water capture reservoirs and fuel bunkers are the newly constructed structures seen in Fiery Cross Reef. A newly visible helicopter base is under construction in Duncan Island suggesting that Beijing may develop a network of bases in the South China Sea to support anti-submarine helicopters.
- 14 March – Beijing will set-up an International Maritime Judicial Center similar to the United Nations Convention on the Law of the Sea (UNCLOS) in order to help protect every countries sea rights. According to Chief justice Zhou Qiang, the Chinese judicial center will primarily focus on the case of countries with territorial issues with China.
- 19 March – Indonesian maritime official involved in a clash with a Chinese coast guard boat over a Chinese trawler accused for illegal fishing off the Natuna islands. Chinese fishermen were under Indonesia's custody, while the trawler was set free after being rammed by Chinese coast guard boat.
- 5 April – China has started to operate a new lighthouse in Subi Reef.
- 10 May – The USS William P. Lawrence sailed within 12 miles of Fiery Cross Reef as part of the freedom of navigation patrol. China scrambled two fighter jets and three warships.
- 13 May – Chinese Foreign Ministry spokeswoman Hua Chunying said that more than 40 countries support its stance on South China Sea dispute.
- 19 May – Indonesian military General Gatot Nurmantyo says they are considering conducting joint patrols with Malaysia and Philippines.
- 23 May – A Chinese government bureau is planning to build a base station in the Spratly Islands to aid fishing boats in trouble and shorten the distance they need to travel.
- 23 June – Indonesian President Joko Widodo sailed on a warship off Natuna islands to send a "clear message that the nation was very serious in its effort to protect its sovereignty".
- 8 July – Philippine Foreign Secretary Perfecto Yasay said that the Philippines is willing to share the natural resources of West Philippine Sea to China.
- 12 July – The arbitration tribunal in Philippines vs China concluded that China's historic claim within the nine-dash line has no legal basis beyond what's stipulated under UNCLOS. Many points were unanimously awarded in favour of the Philippines. Filipino judge Antonio Carpio argues that during the court proceedings, China sent a position paper reiterating its recognition of the 1898 Treaty of Paris, the 1900 Treaty of Washington, and the 1930 US-UK Treaty, therefore recognizing by extension Scarborough Shoal and Spratly Islands as Filipino territories. He added that China likely did not read the full texts of the treaties. Beijing and Taipei rejected the ruling. Other countries have expressed their positions as well.

=== 2017 ===
- 25 September - Vietnam's Ministry of Foreign Affairs expresses opposition after a Filipino coast guard vessel opened fire on a Vietnamese fishing boat, resulting in the death of two fishermen.

=== 2018 ===
- September - A South Korean navy destroyer travelled into what China saw as its territorial waters. A South Korean government official said the navy destroyer was taking refuge from a typhoon and not challenging maritime claims, but he declined to comment on whether Seoul believed the disputed waters belonged to China. A Chinese Defense Ministry spokesman said the ship broke Chinese law by entering its 12-nautical-mile-wide territorial sea around the Paracel Islands without seeking prior permission, but said Beijing accepted South Korea's explanation.

=== 2019 ===
- 19 December - China sent fishing boats guarded by coastguard vessels to waters claimed by Indonesia to be its exclusive economic zone off the Natuna islands. Diplomatic relations between China and Indonesia deteriorated and China clarified that it had "rights and interests over the relevant waters".

=== 2020 ===
- 29 January - Indonesia reported further Chinese fishing boats with Chinese coastguard ship escort in its exclusive economic zone.
- 22 December - The PRC annaounced that the guided missile destroyer John S McCain had been "expelled" after it "trespassed" into Chinese territorial waters close to the Spratly Islands. This claim has been disputed by the US Navy.

=== 2021 ===
- March - More than two hundred Chinese fishing boats were seen moored around Whitsun Reef in the Spratly Islands, a reef claimed by the Philippines as part of its exclusive economic zone. Philippines Defense Secretary Delfin Lorenzana accused China of "provocative action of militarizing the area".
- 11 July - During a meeting with Tajikistan's Foreign Minister Sirojiddin Muhriddin at the State Department in Washington, United States Secretary of State Antony Blinken stated, "an armed attack on Philippine armed forces, public vessels, or aircraft in the South China Sea would invoke US mutual defence commitments under Article IV of the 1951 US-Philippines Mutual Defence Treaty."
- 30 July - The HMS Queen Elizabeth (R08) aircraft carrier task force sailed through disputed international waters in the South China Sea - and deployed ships in the region.
- 3 August - The German frigate Bayern set sail for South China Sea, making it the first German warship to go through the area since 2002.

=== 2022 ===
- 16 July - A U.S. warship challenged China's, Taiwan's, and Vietnam's claims to parts of the Spratly Islands.

=== 2023 ===
- 28 August- China's Ministry of Natural Resources revised its territorial claims map with extension of the "nine-dash line" by an eastern move of a dash near the coast of Borneo. Protests followed from Malaysia, Philippines, Taiwan and Vietnam.

=== 2024 ===
- 17 June - China and the Philippines traded accusations over a ship collision near Second Thomas Shoal. The U.S. State Department condemned actions by China.
- August - Chinese and Philippine vessels collide in multiple incidents near the Sabina Shoal. The U.S. condemned China's actions and expressed support for the Philippines as tensions in the region continued to escalate.
- October - China reportedly installed a synthetic-aperture radar on Triton Island for tracking stealth aircraft, similar to other radar systems it has built further south in Subi Reef.
- November - The Philippine's enacts the Maritime Zones Act, on 8 November 2024. China objected and on 10 November clarified more detail on its territorial sea claims and published its standard names of 64 islands and reefs in the South China Sea.
- November - During a state visit by Indonesian President Probowo Subianto to China, the two countries signed a memorandum of understanding for "joint maritime development" in the area of "overlapping claims" near the Natuna Islands. Indonesia's foreign ministry subsequently issued a statement that the memorandum did not impact Indonesia's sovereignty or rights in the area and that in Indonesia's view the Chinese claims do not have a legal basis. Critics of the memorandum contended that the wording could support China's claims.

=== 2025 ===
- 7 June - A Chinese maritime militia vessel with the hull number of 16838 dragged a parachute anchor that damaged over 300 m^{2} (3,200 sq ft) of coral reef near Pag-asa Island. Philippine authorities regarded the incident as a serious environmental violation within a protected zone and estimated the economic cost at ₱11.1 million.
- July - The Chinese consulate in Auckland formally requested the DocEdge Festival in New Zealand to cancel the screening of a documentary titled Food Delivery: Fresh From the West Philippine Seas. The film documents the experiences of Philippine fishermen and the Philippine Coast Guard operating in contested waters, highlighting tensions with the China Coast Guard in the Western Philippine Sea. In its letter, the consulate justified its request by calling the film propaganda. It also rejected the 2016 arbitration ruling and accused the filmmakers of distorting historical facts. In response, DocEdge published the letter and affirmed its commitment to curatorial freedom, encouraging the public to form their own opinions. The Philippine government condemned China's actions as an attempt to suppress free expression and an affront to democratic values.
- 12 July - The Philippine Coast Guard vessel BRP Teresa Magbanua (MRRV-9701) intercepted the Chinese Navy electronic surveillance ship Tianwangxing (793) and its escorting China Coast Guard cutter 4203 approximately 70 nautical miles west of the Philippine archipelago, within the country's exclusive economic zone. The Chinese Navy ignored radio challenges, prompting a “proactive response” from the Philippine vessel, as it monitored the formation that later included the guided missile destroyer Guilin (164), amid ongoing U.S.-Philippine Cope Thunder military drills.
- 11 August - Chinese Coast Guard 3104 (formerly CNS Ningde, a Type 056 corvette) collided with CNS Guilin, a PLA Navy Type 052D destroyer, while chasing and trying to turn Philippine ships BRP Suluan, BRP Teresa Magbanua, and M/V Pamamalakaya away from the Scarborough Shoal. CCG 3104's bow was crushed by the impact, and casualties were suspected.
- 12 October 2025 - The Philippines and China traded accusations over a maritime incident near Thitu Island. Manila accused Chinese vessels of using water cannon and ramming a Philippine boat, while Beijing claimed Philippine ships had illegally entered waters near Sandy Cay and approached dangerously. The U.S. condemned China's actions as aggressive.
- 19 October 2025 - A Chinese Su-35 fighter jet released flares close to an Australian P-8A surveillance aircraft over the South China Sea, which Australia condemned as unsafe and unprofessional. In response, China filed a formal complaint the next day, accusing Australia of unlawfully entering "into Chinese airspace" over the disputed Paracel Islands.
- 10 September 2025 - China announced plans to create a nature reserve on Scarborough Shoal, a disputed atoll claimed by both China and the Philippines. China said the reserve aims to protect the ecosystem, while the Philippines condemned it as a violation of its sovereignty.
- 17 October 2025 - China deployed maritime security officers, patrol ships, fighter jets, and buoys to Scarborough Shoal, citing its status as a natural reserve. Philippine authorities reported interception of a PCG aerial patrol and reaffirmed their maritime claims amid ongoing disputes.

=== 2026 ===
- 30 June 2026 - A group of Chinese scholars at the Jinan University in Guangzhou concluded that the Philippine Batanes Islands were a natural extension of Taiwan and therefore part of China.
- 18 September 2026 - CCG-21585 (referred as the Sanzhou'an in some Chinese media), a Chinese Coast Guard vessel, collided with BRP Datu Magat Salamat, a vessel of the Philippine Bureau of Fisheries and Aquatic Resources vessel conducting a humanitarian and livelihood patrol to deliver fuel and supplies to local Filipino fishermen.
