= Chinese cutter Haijing 1126 =

History

China
- Name: China Haijian 26 (CMS 26)
- Owner: North China Sea Bureau, State Oceanic Administration
- Operator: 1st Marine Surveillance Flotilla, North China Sea Fleet, China Marine Surveillance
- Commissioned: April 22, 2011
- Decommissioned: July 22, 2013
- Home port: Qingdao, Shandong
- Fate: Transferred to China Coast Guard

History

China
- Name: Haijing 1126
- Operator: China Coast Guard
- Acquired: July 22, 2013
- Home port: Shanghai
- Status: In service

General characteristics
- Class & type: 1,000 ton Type II cutter (Chinese name); Shuke-III class cutter (NATO reporting name)
- Displacement: 1,125 metric tons
- Length: 77 meters
- Propulsion: Man SE diesel engine × 2
- Speed: 20 knots (maximum)
- Range: 5,000 nm

Haijing 1126 (Chinese: 海警1126) is a 1,000 ton Type II cutter (NATO reporting name: Shuke III class) of the China Coast Guard.

She is a member of the 1st Bureau of the China Coast Guard and is stationed in Shanghai.

== Design ==
The Haijing 1126 is 77 meters long. It has a speed of 20 knots, a range of 5000 nm.

== History ==
Haijian 26 (Chinese: 中国海监 26) was commissioned on April 22, 2011, as a China Marine Surveillance (CMS) ship in the 1st Marine Surveillance Flotilla of the North China Sea Fleet.

On May 27, 2013, the Haijian 26's cruise group (including Haijian 26, 46, and 66) entered the disputed waters around the Diaoyu Islands to expel fishing boats sailed by Japanese right-wing Ganbare Nippon activists.

Haijian 26 was renamed Haijing 1126 on July 22, 2013, after being transferred to the China Coast Guard.

On August 7, 2013, she was deployed off the Diaoyu Islands. She was deployed to the same region again on October 1, 2013.
