= Haijian 49 =

History

People's Republic of China
- Name: China Haijian 49 (CMS 49)
- Owner: East China Sea Branch, State Oceanic Administration
- Operator: 4th Marine Surveillance Flotilla, East China Sea Fleet, China Marine Surveillance
- Launched: July 31, 1995
- Home port: Ningbo, Zhejiang

General characteristics
- Displacement: 996.7 metric tons
- Length: 71.4 meters
- Beam: 10.2 meters
- Draught: 3.4 meters (average)
- Depth: 4.5 meters
- Speed: 14.5 knots (cruise), 15.2 knots (maximum)

Haijian 49 (Chinese: 中国海监 49) is a China Marine Surveillance (CMS) ship in the 4th Marine Surveillance Flotilla of the East China Sea Fleet. On September 11, 2012, after Japanese Prime Minister Yoshihiko Noda decided to purchase the disputed Diaoyu Islands from a private owner, Haijian 46 and Haijian 49 set out to conduct cruise operations in waters around the islands.
