= China Marine Surveillance North China Sea Fleet =

China Marine Surveillance North China Sea Fleet (Chinese: 中国海监北海总队), founded on August 18, 1999, was a fleet of the China Marine Surveillance under the State Oceanic Administration. It was disbanded and merged into the China Coast Guard on July 2013 along with the China Marine Surveillance.

== Overview ==
The fleet was headquartered at Sifang, Qingdao, Shandong.

== Organization ==
- 1st Marine Surveillance Flotilla (Chinese: 中国海监第一支队). Homeport: Qingdao, Shandong.
- 2nd Marine Surveillance Flotilla (Chinese: 中国海监第二支队). Homeport: Tianjin.
- 3rd Marine Surveillance Flotilla (Chinese: 中国海监第三支队. Homeport: Dalian, Liaoning.
- North China Sea Air Wing (Chinese: 中国海监北海航空支队). Base:?
