= Chinese cutter Hongying =

History

China
- Name: Haijian 15
- Owner: North China Sea Bureau, State Oceanic Administration
- Operator: 1st Marine Surveillance Flotilla, North China Sea Fleet, China Marine Surveillance
- Builder: Wuchang Shipbuilding
- Laid down: July 2009
- Launched: April 29, 2010
- Commissioned: January 6, 2011
- Decommissioned: July 22, 2013
- Home port: Qingdao, Shandong

China
- Name: Hongying; 红鹰
- Namesake: Red-tailed hawk
- Operator: China Coast Guard
- Acquired: July 22, 2013
- Home port: Qingdao
- Identification: Pennant number: 6103(formerly 1115)
- Status: In service

General characteristics
- Class & type: 1500 tonne class (Shuwu class)
- Displacement: 1,740 t (1,710 long tons) (full load)
- Length: 88 m (288 ft 9 in)
- Beam: 12 m (39 ft 4 in)
- Depth: 5.6 m (18 ft 4 in)
- Propulsion: 2 × German MAK diesel engines, 3,400 kW (4,600 hp)
- Speed: 18 knots (33 km/h; 21 mph) (maximum)
- Range: 6,000 nmi (11,000 km; 6,900 mi)

Hongying (6103) is a China Coast Guard 1500 tonne class (NATO: Shuwu-class) cutter. She is more commonly known as Haijing 6103 (Chinese: 海警6103), formerly Haijing 1115 (Chinese: 海警1115) or Haijian 15 (Chinese: 海监 15) due to her pennant numbers. It is operated by the 6th Bureau of the China Coast Guard and is stationed in Qingdao.

== History ==
While in the CMS, she was in the 1st Marine Surveillance Flotilla of the North China Sea Fleet.

Haijian 15 was christened and commissioned on January 6, 2011, at her home port of Qingdao. Haijian 15 has frequently conducted cruise operations in disputed waters around the Senkaku Islands. In 2012 alone, Haijian 15 was deployed to waters around the Diaoyu Islands four times, for 103 days in total. She once sailed to a position that is 1.55 nautical miles (2.87 km; 1.78 mi) away from the main island, Diaoyu Island, and personnel on board raised China's national flag to assert China's claim of sovereignty over the Diaoyu Islands. On July 22, 2013, when the China Marine Surveillance was disbanded, the ship was handed to the China Coast Guard and renamed to Hongying (1115).

Hongying has frequently engaged in law enforcement patrol operations in waters around the Senkaku Islands.

Hongying was recently renumbered to 6103.
