= Haijian 51 =

Chinese seaship

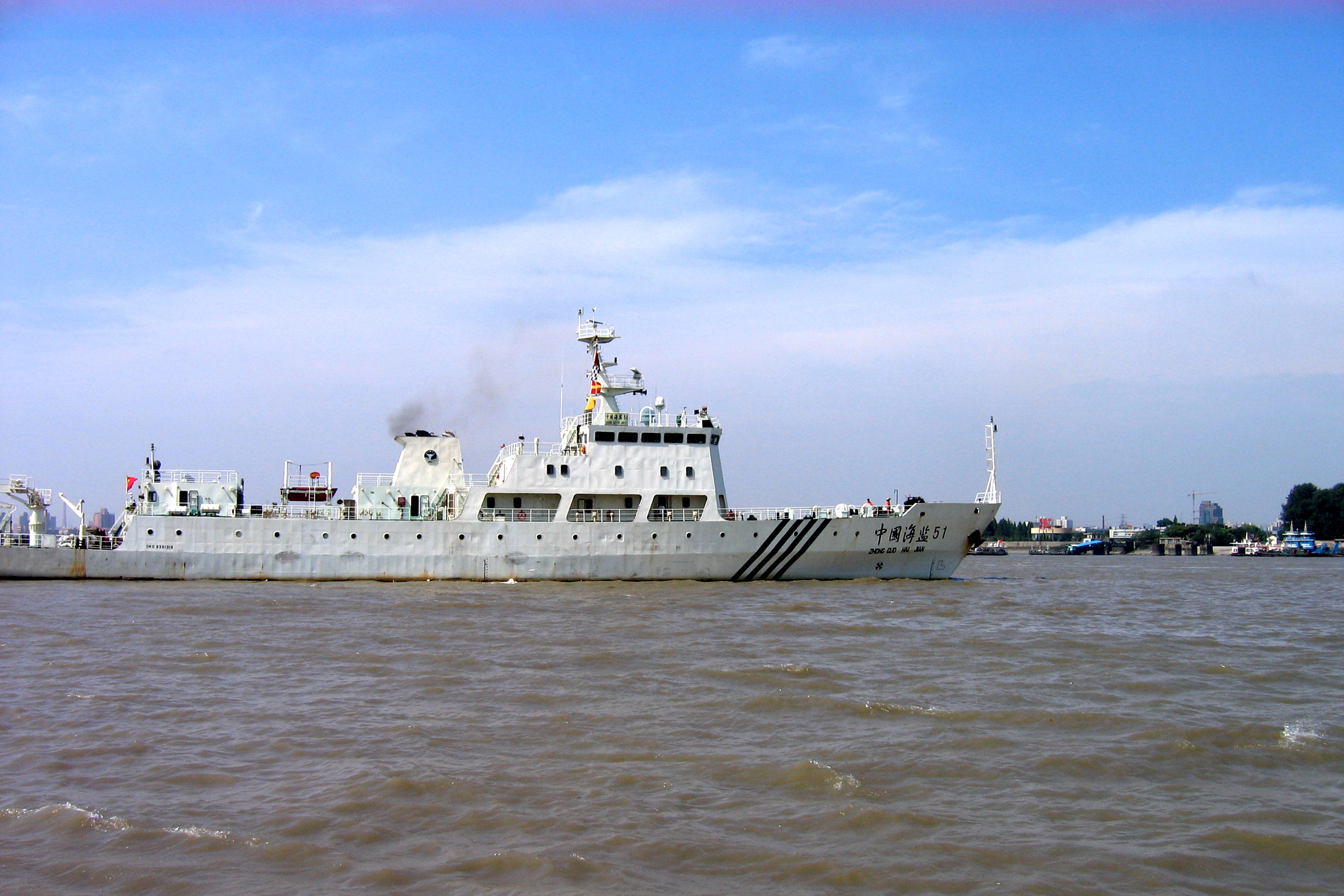
- Haijian 51

History

People's Republic of China
- Name: China Haijian 51 (CMS 51)
- Owner: East China Sea Branch, State Oceanic Administration
- Operator: 5th Marine Surveillance Flotilla, East China Sea Fleet, China Marine Surveillance
- Builder: Wuchang Shipbuilding
- Laid down: March 22, 2003
- Launched: November 19, 2005
- Commissioned: June 2011
- Home port: Shanghai

General characteristics
- Displacement: 1,937 t
- Length: 87.7 m
- Beam: 12 m
- Draught: 3.5 m
- Speed: 18 knots
- Range: > 6,000 nm
- Complement: 50 personnel

Haijian 51 (Chinese: 中国海监 51) is a China Marine Surveillance (CMS) ship in the 5th Marine Surveillance Flotilla of the East China Sea Fleet, which was christened and commissioned on November 11, 2005 at the 5th Marine Surveillance Flotilla's dock in Shanghai. The first captain was He Xuming (Chinese: 何旭明).

Haijian 51 was renamed CCG-2151 in July 2013, under a unified, newly established China Coast Guard, integrating the former China Marine Surveillance, China Fishery Authority, General Administration of Customs, Public Security Border Troops.

== Cruise operations ==
CCG-2151 has been frequently involved in law enforcement patrol operations in waters around Diaoyu Islands.
