= Haijian 52 =

History

People's Republic of China
- Name: China Haijian 52 (CMS 52)
- Owner: East China Sea Branch, State Oceanic Administration
- Operator: 5th Marine Surveillance Fortilla, East China Sea Fleet, China Marine Surveillance
- Launched: 1967
- Commissioned: 2000
- Homeport: Shanghai

General characteristics
- Displacement: 2421 t (full load), 726 t (gross)
- Length: 94.73 meters
- Beam: 14 meters
- Depth: 7.8 meters
- Speed: 14.5 knots (cruise), 16 knots (maximum)

Haijian 52 (Chinese: 中国海监 52) is a China Marine Surveillance ship in the 5th Marine Surveillance Flotilla of the East China Sea Fleet. Originally christened as "Shijian" (English: practice, Chinese: 实践) and commissioned in 1967 as a comprehensive oceanic survey vessel, Haijian 52 joined CMS, East China Sea Fleet in 2000. It was planned to be inactive in 2007 but her service was extended.
