= Type 272 icebreaker =

Chinese icebreaker

Class overview
- Operators: People's Liberation Army Navy
- Preceded by: Type 210 icebreaker
- Built: 2013–2016
- In service: 2015–Present
- Completed: 2
- Active: 2

General characteristics
- Type: Icebreaker
- Displacement: 4,860 tonnes (4,780 long tons; 5,360 short tons)
- Length: 103.1 m (338 ft 3 in)
- Beam: 18.4 m (60 ft 4 in)
- Installed power: Diesel engines
- Speed: 18 knots (33 km/h; 21 mph)
- Range: 7,000 nmi (13,000 km)

Type 272 icebreaker is the third generation icebreaker indigenously developed by China for the People's Liberation Army Navy (PLAN) to replace its predecessor Type 210 icebreaker, and Type 272 has received NATO reporting name Yanrao class.

Type 272 icebreaker is the improvement over earlier Type 210 icebreaker and it is larger than its predecessor. The pennant number of the first unit of Type 272 consists of two Chinese character Hai-bing (海冰, meaning Sea Ice in Chinese), followed by a three digit number, and this pennant number is the same pennant number used by a first generation Chinese icebreaker Type 071 that retired in June 2013, five months before the start of the construction of the first unit of this first unit of Type 272 icebreaker in November 2013. Type 272 has more advanced design features in comparison to earlier Chinese icebreakers, such as the incorporation of multifunction displays, and it can withstand wind scale of 12 when sailing. Type 272 is capable of carrying a large helicopter of Changhe Z-8 class, and the second unit is built by PLAN Plant No. 4180, which is also commonly known as Southern Liaoning Shipyard (辽南造船厂).

Type	Pennant #	Laid down	Launched	Commissioned	Status	Fleet
272	Haibing 722	November 2013	March 2015	January 1, 2016	Active	North Sea Fleet
272	Haibing 723	—	July 2015	March 17, 2016	Active	North Sea Fleet
