= Haijian 66 =

History

People's Republic of China
- Name: China Haijian 66 (CMS 66)
- Owner: East China Sea Branch, State Oceanic Administration
- Operator: East China Sea Fleet, China Marine Surveillance
- Builder: Changzhou Shipyard, Huangpu Shipbuilding
- Commissioned: January 24, 2011

General characteristics
- Class & type: 1,000t-class Type-II cutter
- Displacement: 1,290 t
- Length: 77.39 m
- Beam: 10.4 m
- Draught: 4 m
- Propulsion: 4,760 shp
- Speed: maximum > 20 knots
- Range: 5,000 nmi

Haijian 66 (Chinese: 海监66) is a China Marine Surveillance (CMS) ship in the East China Sea Fleet . She is one of the fastest CMS ships in the second building plan. In February 2012, Haijian 66 obstructed Japanese survey vessel Syoyo (HL-01) in disputed waters near Okinawa.

CMS ships of the same class, 1,000t-class Type-II, include Haijian 75.

Haijian 66 was renamed CCG-2166 in July 2013.
