= Scarborough Shoal standoff =

Dispute between China and the Philippines

- Part of South China Sea disputes
- Location of Scarborough Shoal
Date	8 April 2012 – present (14 years, 4 months and 2 weeks)
Location	Scarborough Shoal, South China Sea; 15°11′N 117°46′E
Status	Ongoing: De-escalation of tensions between claimant nations; Scarborough Shoal controlled by China

Belligerents
Philippines: Bureau of Fisheries and Aquatic Resources; Atin Ito Coalition	China: China Maritime Safety Administration; Maritime Militia; China Fisheries Law Enforcement Command

Units involved
Armed Forces of the Philippines: Philippine Navy; BRP Gregorio del Pilar; Philippine Air Force; NC-212i; Philippine Coast Guard: Civilian and fishing boats; Datu Cabaylo-class multi-mission offshore vessel: BRP Datu Sanday (MMOV-3002); BRP Datu Bankaw; BRP Datu Tamblot	People's Liberation Army: People's Liberation Army Navy; China Marine Surveillance; Zhongguo Haijian 75; Zhongguo Haijian 84; People's Liberation Army Air Force; China Coast Guard: Civilian and fishing boats

Casualties and losses
3 fishing vessels damaged 1 patrol vessel damaged 2 fisherman injured	1 China Coast Guard vessel (Chinese cutter Jiangdao 3104) damaged 2 China Coast Guard personnel killed

The Scarborough Shoal standoff is a dispute between the Philippines and the People's Republic of China over the Scarborough Shoal. Tensions began on April 8, 2012, after the attempted apprehension by the Philippine Navy of eight mainland Chinese fishing vessels near the shoal, which resulted in the actual control of the atoll under China.

== Overview ==
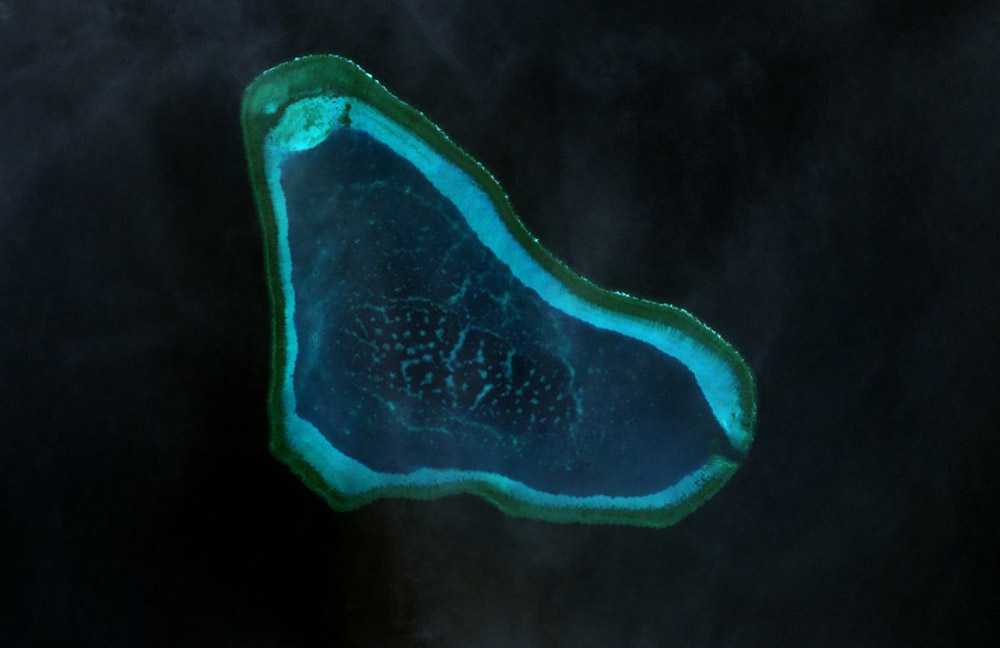
Landsat 7 image of Scarborough Shoal

The Scarborough Shoal is a disputed atoll claimed by both China and the Philippines. On April 8, 2012, a Philippine Navy surveillance plane spotted eight Chinese fishing vessels anchored in the waters of the shoal. BRP Gregorio del Pilar was sent on the same day by the Philippine Navy to survey the vicinity of the shoal, and confirmed the presence of the fishing vessels and their ongoing activities. On April 10, 2012, BRP Gregorio del Pilar came to inspect the catch of the fishing vessels. The Filipino inspection team claimed that they discovered illegally collected corals, giant clams, and live sharks inside the first vessel boarded by the team. BRP Gregorio del Pilar reported that they attempted to arrest the Chinese fishermen but were blocked by Chinese maritime surveillance ships, China Marine Surveillance 75 (Zhongguo Haijian 75) and China Marine Surveillance 84 (Zhongguo Haijian 84). Since then, tensions have continued between the two countries.

The experience of the dispute later prompted the Philippines to initiate an arbitration case.

== Reactions and related incidents ==
=== 2012 ===
==== China boycott calls ====
- An unsuccessful call was made in the Philippines to boycott goods made in China by the Albay Governor Joey Salceda.
- In the same year, Filipino-Americans, together with the Vietnamese community in Florida also called for the boycott of Chinese goods.

==== Cyber attack exchanges ====
Hackers suspected to be from China defaced the website of the University of the Philippines on April 20, 2012. The hackers left a message claiming, "We come from China! Huangyan Island is Ours". On April 21, "Anonymous #Occupy Philippines" retaliated and attacked the China University Media Union website, defacing its homepage with an image of a Guy Fawkes mask. The hacker said, "Chinese government is clearly retarded. Scarborough Shoal is ours!". The website of the University of the Philippines was back online at the same day. After the attacks, Philippine President Benigno Aquino III's deputy spokesperson Abigail Valte said that it didn't appear that the attacks would have any negative effect on the talks by Manila and Beijing to find a diplomatic solution to the standoff, and urged both Filipinos and Chinese to refrain from escalating tensions. Philippine websites of Official Gazette, the Presidential Communications Development and Strategic Planning Office, and the Presidential Museum and Library were also defaced in April. On May 4, hackers defaced the websites of The Philippine Star newspaper.

==== Philippine fruit exports to China ====
China has imposed stricter regulations on its import of Philippine bananas, as a shipload of bananas was rejected in May, allegedly due to its failure to pass quarantine tests. According to Philippine banana exporters, China's move was related to the standoff in the Scarborough shoal. China also ordered stiffer inspections over Philippine pineapples and other fruits coming from the country.

==== Suspension of tours to the Philippines ====
Most Chinese travel agencies suspended tours to the Philippines due to the standoff over the Scarborough shoal. Tourists from China make about 9% of total arrivals to the Philippines according to the Philippine Department of Tourism.

The state-owned China Travel Service, Shanghai Tourism Bureau and Ctrip.com suspended all tours to the Philippines indefinitely citing the anti-Chinese sentiment in the country and for the safety of Chinese nationals.

==== Philippine protests ====
Filipinos organized a protest near the Chinese Consulate in Manila against China's policies in the Scarborough Shoal on May 11. However, this was short-lived as just a fraction of the 1,000 people expected turned up to participate in the protest.

China deployed police near the Philippine Embassy in Beijing where about 200 protesters were reported. The protest in Beijing ended peacefully. The Chinese embassy in Manila advised Chinese nationals to stay off the streets. Taiwan also released a similar advisory to its residents staying in the Philippines.

==== Hong Kong protests ====
Hong Kong activists organized a protest on May 11, to reiterate China's claim over the Scarborough shoal near the Philippine Consulate in Hong Kong. The protesters sent an open letter to the authorities claiming that the Scarborough shoal has been a Chinese territory since 1279 during the Yuan Dynasty. They also accuse the Philippines of inciting anti-China demonstrations among Filipinos and disrupting Chinese fishermen in the shoal.

==== May 12 Beijing protests ====
Five protesters unfurled banners in front of the Philippine embassy in Beijing reading, "Huangyan Island will always belong to China" and "Keep your hands off Huangyan Island". The protest did not take long and the protesters were dispersed by the police by noon.

==== Fishing ban ====
The Chinese government unilaterally imposed a fishing ban in the South China Sea, where the Scarborough shoal lies, lasting from May 16 to August 1. Since 1999, China has been imposing the annual summer fishing ban, which covers fishermen, regardless of nationality. Mono-layer gillnets, and hook and line fishing is not covered by the ban.

The Philippines did not recognize the Chinese fishing ban but imposed its own fishing ban. The Filipino fishing ban lasted from May 16 to July 15 and the Philippine Coast Guard will ban Filipino fishermen from the shoal. Former President Benigno Aquino III insisted that the ban was for the preservation of marine resources. Fish aggregating devices were installed in the municipal waters of Santa Cruz, Candelaria, Masinloc, Palauig and Iba in Zambales, as well as in La Union, Ilocos Sur and Ilocos Norte to ensure the livelihoods of affected Filipino fishermen. As of June 26, fishing vessels, together with paramilitary ships, are still in Scarborough shoal despite the Chinese fishing ban still effect.

==== Faeldon's planned protest ====
Former Marine Capt. Nicanor Faeldon, planned to lead a group of fishermen to the Scarborough shoal as a protest to assert the Philippines' claim over the shoal. Faeldon also considered planting a Philippine flag on the shoal. On May 18, President Aquino, called Faeldon to dissuade him from pushing through his trip. According to Faeldon, even though his plan pushed through, his group does not intend to plant a flag, as opposed to earlier reports, or to fish in the area.

==== Continued Chinese presence ====
The Philippines claimed that under a 2012 deal mediated by the United States, China and the Philippines promised to withdraw their forces from the shoal until a deal over its ownership could be reached. The Philippines "complied with the agreement" and withdrew. China, however, did not abide by the agreement and maintained its presence at the shoal, effectively militarizing it. Philippine president Benigno S. Aquino III later compared China's behavior to Nazi Germany's annexation of Czechoslovakia. China claimed that no such deal had been reached, and that it was open to talking to Philippines provided that non-regional entities such as USA stayed out of such talks.

By July 2012, China had erected a barrier to the entrance of the shoal, according to the Philippine Department of Foreign Affairs. Since then, vessels belonging to the China Marine Surveillance and Fisheries Law Enforcement Command have been observed in the nearby disputed shoal and Chinese government vessels have been turning away Filipino vessels sailing to the area. In response, the Philippines has stated that it would be preparing to resend vessels to the shoal, in what has been described as a "cold standoff". By January 2014, China continued to maintain a presence within the shoal, among heightened tensions regarded a new law which requires non-Chinese fishing boats to seek permission from China when in the South China Sea, however Philippine fishing boats were able to fish around the shoal without Chinese interaction.

=== 2014 ===
==== Water cannon use by China ====
In February 2014, Filipino officials announced that a Chinese vessel had fired a water cannon at Filipino fishermen. China dismissed reports regarding the incident and reiterated their claim to the shoal. The United States called the actions of the Chinese coast guard "provocative".

An article in Foreign Policy identified increased Chinese patrols of the Shoals as a reason for why China's accusation that the US pivot was stoking tensions in the South China Sea was "patently false".

=== 2015 ===
==== Water cannon use in 2015 ====
In April 2015, a Chinese Coast Guard vessel used water cannons on Philippine fishing boats, and seized the catch of some of the boats, in waters near the shoal.

=== 2021 ===
==== Fishing exploitation ====
In April 2021, there were an estimated 287 Chinese fishing vessels that fished on the Scarborough Shoal. It's suspected that 240,000 kilos, or more than 260 tons, were illegally taken by Chinese fishing vessels. Which in turn outraged many Filipinos including Department of Foreign Affairs Secretary Teodoro Locsin Jr. who filed many Démarche or more commonly known as Diplomatic Protests against the Chinese incursion to Beijing.

=== 2025 ===
On 11 August 2025, a China Coast Guard vessel was damaged after colliding with a Chinese Navy ship while trying to expel the Philippine Coast Guard vessel BRP Suluan from Scarborough Shoal. Following the collision, the BRP Suluan personnel, along with BRP Teresa Magbanua, issued a radio call offering assistance but received no response. Forty-two crew members of BRP Suluan earned the Coast Guard Bronze Cross Medal and Ribbon, while the commanding officer of BRP Suluan, Captain Jomark Angue, earned the Coast Guard Distinguished Service Medal and Ribbon.

== International reaction ==
- Australia – Australian Foreign Minister Bob Carr, while in Shanghai on May 12, urged claimant nations to conform to international conventions and law for resolution, saying "We don't take a side on the various claims over the South China Sea. But we do, given our interest in the South China Sea, and given the fact that a large proportion of our trade travels through it, we do call on governments to clarify and pursue those claims and accompanying maritime rights in accordance with international law including the U.N. Law of the Sea Convention."
- India – The Indian Ministry of External Affairs released a statement saying that "Maintenance of peace and security in the region is of vital interest to the international community. India urges both countries to exercise restraint and resolve the issue diplomatically according to principles of international law."
- Malaysia – Malaysian Prime Minister Najib Razak stated that his country supports the Philippines' call for a "peaceful resolution" through a "multilateral solution" to the Scarborough shoal conflict.
- Pakistan – Pakistan's Ambassador to China Masood Khan said in an ambassador's forum in the China Women's University that "Pakistan is with China" on the Scarborough Shoal incident.
- Russia – Russia's Ambassador to Manila, Nikolay Kudashev, reiterated that Russia supports a bilateral solution among the claimant countries and opposes the involvement of other nations in the South China Sea disputes. Kudashev also noted that Russia is not a party to the Scarborough shoal dispute and that his country wants to ensure freedom of navigation in the South China Sea. Kudashev also stated that "The UNCLOS (United Nations Convention on the Law of the Sea) would provide a good and solid basis."
- Taiwan – Former Taiwanese President Ma Ying-jeou stated his hope that the conflict will be solved in a "peaceful manner", but also reiterating that Taiwan "will still continue to uphold sovereign claims over the South China Sea".
- United Kingdom – British Prime Minister David Cameron stressed that the United Kingdom calls for a "peaceful resolution" to the Scarborough shoal conflict.
- United States – The United States on Tuesday, June 14, 2011, indicated its support for the Philippines amid the escalating tensions over the disputed Spratly Islands in the South China Sea. US Ambassador Harry Thomas said, "I want to assure you that on all sectors, we, the United States, are with the Philippines, ... The Philippines and the United States are strategic treaty allies. We are partners. We will continue to consult and work with each other on all issues, including the South China Sea".
- Vietnam – Vietnamese Foreign Ministry Spokesman Luong Thanh Nghi said that Vietnam is "deeply concerned" over the Scarborough shoal incident. He stressed that "concerned parties need to practice restraint and peacefully resolve the disputes based on international law, particularly the United Nations Convention on the Law of the Sea in 1982 and the Declaration on Conduct of the Parties in the East Sea (DOC), to maintain peace, stability, security and maritime safety in the East Sea and the region".

== ITLOS involvement ==
The International Tribunal for the Law of the Sea (ITLOS) is an intergovernmental organization created by the mandate of the Third United Nations Conference on the Law of the Sea, with responsibility for the regulation of seabed mining beyond the limits of national jurisdiction, and with the power to settle disputes between party states.

In June 2013, the Philippines decided to bring the territorial row before the ITLOS after it had "exhausted all political and diplomatic avenues for a peaceful negotiated settlement of its maritime dispute with China", saying that it would ask the tribunal to declare China's claims as "invalid". China formally rejected the arbitration proceedings initiated by the Philippines. According to Annex VII of the United Nations Convention on the Law of the Sea (UNCLOS), however, China's refusal would not necessarily impede the proceedings.

In February 2014, it was reported that China had offered mutual withdrawal from the shoal and other inducements if the Philippines would refrain from submitting a formal pleading, and that the Philippine position was, "With what's on the table, there's not enough."

== Heightened tensions in 2016 and 2026 ==
Having observed boat activity at the shoal that could have signaled preparation for development activity, the U.S. "flew three different air patrols near Scarborough ..., including on April 19 and 21", 2016, and talked of and reportedly were considering other reactions in light of generally higher tensions in the Spratlys and the region. The U.S. flights did observe the 12-mile territorial limit from the shoal.

Further tensions arose in 2026, when China moved to block the Scarborough Shoal. The timing of this occurred while the United States was involved in the Iran conflict and the United States denied passage of six Chinese ships in the Straits of Hormuz waterway.

== See also ==
- China–Philippines relations
- Hai Yang Shi You 981 standoff
- Second Thomas Shoal laser incident
- Territorial disputes in the South China Sea
