= Sandy Cay =

Sandy Cay may refer to:

- Sandy Cay (British Virgin Islands)
- Sandy Cay (South China Sea)

== See also ==
- Sand Cay
