= Haian (disambiguation) =

Hai'an (海安) is a county-level city in Jiangsu, China.

Haian or Hai'an may also refer to:

- Hai'an Range (Chinese: 海岸山脈), on the eastern shore of Taiwan
- Hai'an Subdistrict (海安街道), Jinping District, Shantou, Guangdong
- Hai'an, Chenjiagang, Xiangshui, Yancheng, Jiangsu
- Chinese frigate Hai-an
- Chinese cutter Hai'an
