= Chinese cutter Haijing 1123 =

Chinese coast guard ship

History

China
- Name: Haijian 23
- Owner: North China Sea Bureau, State Oceanic Administration
- Operator: 1st Marine Surveillance Flotilla, North China Sea Fleet, China Marine Surveillance
- Builder: Wuchang Shipbuilding
- Laid down: Around July 2009
- Launched: Around April 29, 2010
- Commissioned: January 6, 2011
- Decommissioned: July 2013
- Home port: Qingdao, Shandong

China
- Name: Haijing 1123 (Chinese: 海警1123)
- Operator: China Coast Guard
- Acquired: July 2013
- Home port: Shanghai
- Status: In service

General characteristics
- Class & type: 1,000t-class Type-II cutter
- Displacement: 1,290 t (1,270 long tons)
- Length: 77.39 m (253 ft 11 in)
- Beam: 10.4 m (34 ft 1 in)
- Draught: 4 m (13 ft 1 in)
- Propulsion: 3,550 kW (4,760 shp)
- Speed: maximum > 20 knots (37 km/h; 23 mph)
- Range: 5,000 nmi (9,300 km; 5,800 mi)

Haijing 1123, formerly Haijian 23, (Chinese: 海监 23) in China Marine Surveillance service, is a Chinese Coast Guard 1000 ton type II (NATO reporting name: Shuke-III class) cutter.

== History ==
The vessel was formerly a China Marine Surveillance (CMS) ship in the 1st Marine Surveillance Flotilla of the North China Sea Fleet. Haijian 23 was christened and commissioned on January 6, 2011, at her home port of Qingdao. Haijian 23 has been frequently conducting cruise operations in territorial waters around Diaoyu Islands.

On June 14, 2013, Haijian 23, together with Haijian 51 and Haijian 49, conducted law enforcement cruise operations in territorial waters around Diaoyu Islands.

Haijian 23 was renamed Haijing 1123 in July 2013 under the unified, newly reestablished China Coast Guard. On 28 October 2013 Haijing 1123 was involved in patrol operations in Chinese territorial waters around Diaoyu Islands. In 2015 Haijing 1123 patrolled Chinese waters near the Luconia Shoals resulting in a standoff with the Royal Malaysian Navy.

Haijing 1123 is part of the 1st Bureau of the China Coast Guard indicated by its pennant number. She is stationed in Shanghai.
