= Tuzhong-class cutter =

Chinese rescue ship class

Class overview
- Operators: China Coast Guard; China Marine Surveillance(former); People's Liberation Army Navy(former)
- In service: c. 1980 - ?
- Completed: 4
- Active: 3

General characteristics
- Type: Patrol, rescue and salvage ship
- Displacement: 3,658 tonnes (3,600 long tons; 4,032 short tons) (full)
- Length: 84.9 metres (279 ft)
- Beam: 14 metres (46 ft)
- Draught: 5.5 metres (18 ft)
- Propulsion: 2 x Type 9 ESDZ 43/82B diesel engines; 2 shafts; Total output: 9,000 bhp (6,700 kW)
- Speed: 18.5 knots (34.3 km/h; 21.3 mph)
- Crew: 60
- Sensors & processing systems: Fin Curve navigation radar

The Tuzhong-class cutter (as designated by NATO) is a class of oceangoing rescue and salvage ship in the People's Republic of China's China Coast Guard (CCG). Four were built at the Zhonghua Shipyard, and entered service with the People's Liberation Army Navy in the late-1970s. In 2009, each of the three fleets had one and the fourth was in reserve. In 2012, three were transferred to China Marine Surveillance and from there to the CCG.

The Tuzhongs have a 35-ton capacity towing winch. In PLAN service, Beituo 710 was fitted with a Type 352 radar, possibly for cruise missile tests.

== Ships of the class ==
Name	Hull No.	Builder	Launched	Commissioned	Fleet	Status	Notes
Haijing 6301						Active	Ex-Haijian 110, ex-Beituo 710 of the North Sea Fleet, ex-Haijing 1310
Haijing 2337						Active	Ex-Haijian 137, ex-Dongtuo 830 of the East Sea Fleet.
Haijing 3367						Active	Ex-Haijian 167, ex-Nantuo 154 of the South Sea Fleet.
T 890						Reserve	

== Sources ==
- Saunders, Stephan, ed. (2009). Jane's Fighting Ships 2009-2010. Jane's Information Group. p. 138. ISBN 0-7106-2888-9.
- Saunders, Stephan, ed. (2015). Jane's Fighting Ships 2015-2016. Jane's Information Group. ISBN 978-0710631435.
- Wertheim, Eric (2013). The Naval Institute Guide to Combat Fleets of the World: Their Ships, Aircraft, and Systems (16 ed.). Annapolis, Maryland: Naval Institute Press. ISBN 978-1591149545.
