= Maritime law enforcement agencies in China =

China operates several law enforcement agencies.

== Active agencies ==
=== China Maritime Safety Administration ===
The China Maritime Safety Administration (China MSA, Chinese: 中国海事局) is a government agency which coordinated maritime control, traffic, and search and rescue in the territorial waters of the PRC. The CMSA is part of the Ministry of Transport. The CMSA was not merged into the CCG and retains its independent role.

MSA ships are named "Haixun-XX".

=== Yangtze River Shipping Public Security Bureau ===
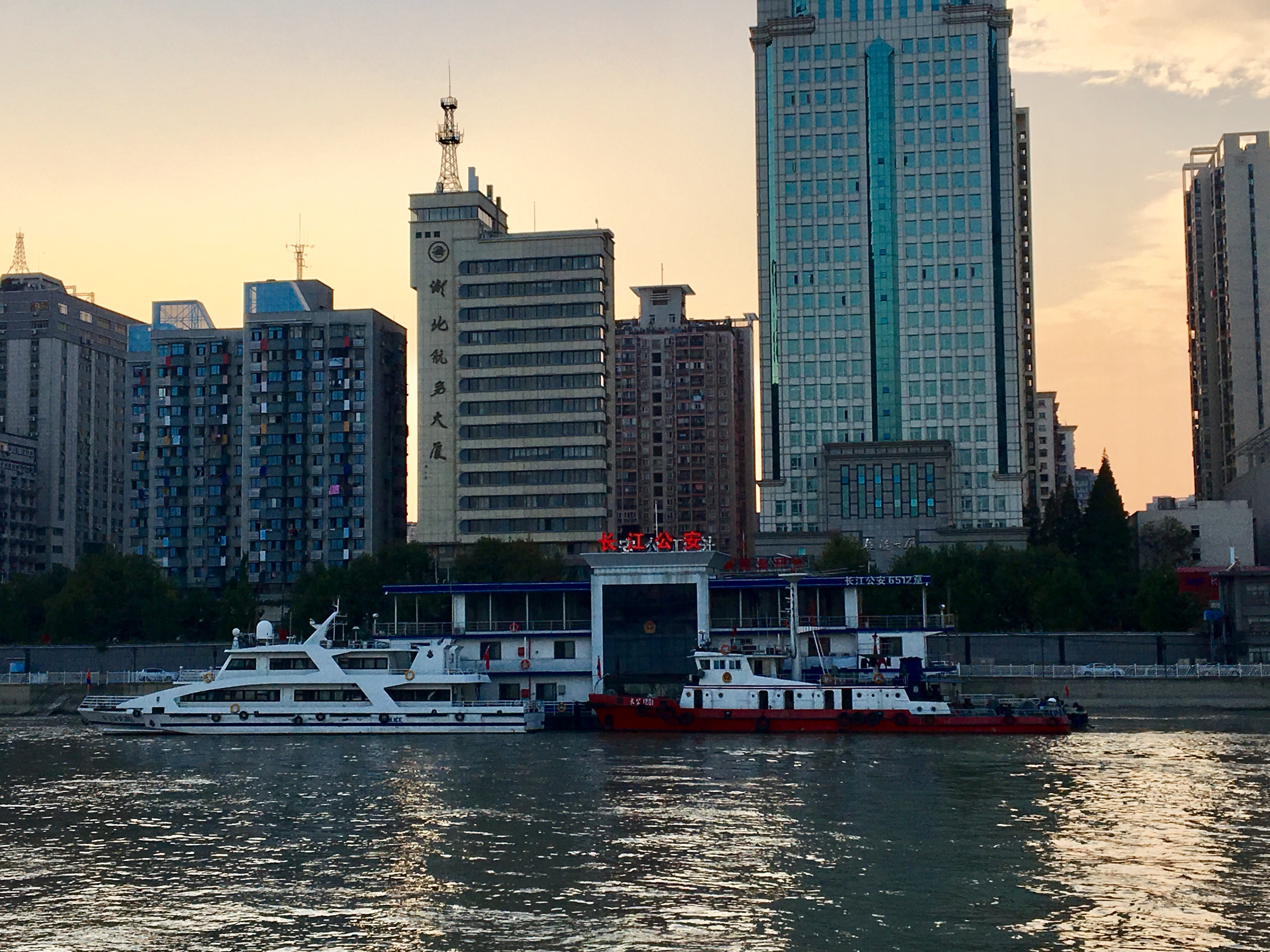
Yangtze River Shipping Public Security Bureau patrol boats in Wuhan

The Yangtze River Shipping Public Security Bureau (长江航运公安局) is a law enforcement agency responsible for the Yangtze river and is responsible for preventing environmental crimes and general law enforcement.

== Defunct agencies ==
=== China Fishery Law Enforcement ===
The China Fishery Law Enforcement (CFLE; Chinese: 中国渔政) was a law enforcement under the Ministry of Agriculture. It was responsible for the enforcement of laws concerning fishing and maritime resources in Chinese territorial waters and exclusive economic zones (EEZ). It was charged with protecting Chinese fishing vessels and personnel, resolving disputes in fishing activities, preventing illegal fishing, and protecting maritime resources. The CFLE was merged into the China Coast Guard in 2013 however local units still exist.

CFLE cutters were named "Yuzheng-XX".

=== China Marine Surveillance ===
The China Marine Surveillance (CMS; Chinese: 中国海监) was created on 19 October 1998 as a paramilitary maritime law enforcement agency under the auspices of China's State Oceanic Administration. It was responsible for law enforcement within China's territorial waters, exclusive economic zones (EEZ), and shores. It was also charged with protecting the maritime environment, natural resources, navigation aids and other facilities, and carried out maritime surveys. In emergencies, it also engaged in search and rescue missions. The CMS was unarmed.

According to a 2008 report in China Daily, CMS operated nine aircraft and more than 200 patrol vessels. CMS ships were named "Haijian-XX", where XX is a number.

The CMS was merged into the China Coast Guard in 2013, however local CMS units were not disbanded and remain active.

=== Customs ===
The PRC's General Administration of Customs (Chinese: 中国海关) operated a maritime anti-smuggling force. Its ships were named "Haiguan-XX".
