= Chinese icebreaker Haijing 6401 =

Chinese icebreaker

Class overview
- Preceded by: Type 071 icebreaker
- Succeeded by: Type 272 icebreaker
- In service: 1982–
- Completed: 1
- Active: 1

History

China
- Name: Haibing 723 (Chinese: 海冰723)
- Namesake: Sea ice
- Commissioned: 1982
- Decommissioned: November 2012
- Renamed: from C723
- Fate: Transferred to China Marine Surveillance

China
- Name: Haijian 111 (Chinese: 海监111)
- Operator: China Marine Surveillance
- Acquired: November 2012
- Decommissioned: 2013
- Fate: Transferred to China coast guard

China
- Name: Haijing 1411 (Chinese: 海警1411)
- Operator: China Coast Guard
- Acquired: 2013
- Renamed: to Haijing 6401 (Chinese: 海警6401)
- Status: In service

General characteristics
- Type: Icebreaker
- Displacement: 4,491 tonnes (4,420 long tons; 4,950 short tons) (full)
- Length: 102 m (334 ft 8 in)
- Beam: 17.1 m (56 ft 1 in)
- Draft: 5.9 m (19 ft 4 in)
- Installed power: Two diesel engines
- Speed: 17 knots (31 km/h; 20 mph)
- Complement: 95
- Armament: 8 x 37 mm gun (4 twin)

Haijing 6401 (NATO reporting name Yanbing) is a China Coast Guard icebreaker.

== Design ==
Haijing 6401 is the sole icebreaker of the Type 210 (NATO: Yanbing) class. According to a Chinese report in the early 2000s using Japanese sources, it could break 1.2 meters thick ice and the superstructure was fitted with electronic surveillance equipment.

== History ==
The ship was built for the People's Liberation Army Navy in 1982 as C723, which was then Changed to Haibing 723, and operated as a spy ship in the North Sea Fleet.

In May 2000, the ship transited the Tsugaru Strait, conducted surveillance near Tsushima Island for seven days starting on May 14, and passed through the strait three times from May 23 to 26 to surveil the Cape Tappi "guard station." Japan lodged a complaint with China.

The ship was transferred to the China Marine Surveillence's North China Sea Fleet and renamed to Haijian 111 (Chinese: 海监111). On 21 December 2012 Haijian 111 participated in a patrol with Haijian 50 and Haijian 83 off the Diaoyu Islands.

The ship was transferred to the coast guard in July 2013 after the China Marine Surveillence was disbanded. Haijian 111 was renamed to Haijing 1411.

According to the Office of Naval Intelligence, Haijing 1411 was renamed to Haijing 6401.
