= Chinese cutter Haijing 6301 =

Ship of the China Coast Guard

History

China
- Name: Beituo 710
- Operator: People's Liberation Army Navy
- Commissioned: 1970s
- Decommissioned: November 12, 2012
- Fate: Transferred to China Marine Surveillance

History

China
- Name: Haijian 110
- Operator: China Marine Surveillance
- Acquired: November 12, 2012
- Decommissioned: July 2013
- Home port: Qingdao, Shandong
- Fate: Transferred to China Coast Guard

History
- Name: Haijing 1310
- Operator: China Coast Guard
- Acquired: July 2013
- Renamed: Haijing 6301
- Home port: Qingdao
- Status: Active

General characteristics
- Class & type: Tuzhong-class cutter
- Displacement: 3,658 t
- Length: 84.9 m
- Beam: 14 m
- Draught: 5.5 m
- Propulsion: 2 engines, 9000 bhp
- Speed: 18.5 knots
- Crew: 60
- Sensors & processing systems: Type 352 radar; Fin Curve radar

Haijing 6301 (Chinese: 海警6301) is a Tuzhong-class cutter of the China Coast Guard's (CCG) 6th Bureau based in Qingdao.

== History ==
The ship was built in the late-1970s by the Zhonghua Shipyard for the People's Liberation Army Navy (PLAN). She was based in the North Sea Fleet as Beituo 710 (Chinese: 北拖710). She was fitted with a Type 352 radar for cruise missile tests.

The ship was transferred to the China Marine Surveillance's (CMS) North China Sea Fleet on 12 November 2012 as Haijian 110 (Chinese: 海监110).

In July 2013, the CMS was disbanded as part of the creation of the CCG. and the ship transferred to the CCG. She was renamed to Haijing 1310 (Chinese: 海警1310). By 2024, her name was Haijing 6301.

== Sources ==
- Saunders, Stephan, ed. (2015). Jane's Fighting Ships 2015-2016. Jane's Information Group. ISBN 978-0710631435.
