= Chinese cutter Haijing 2350 =

Chinese patrol ship commissioned in 2011

History

China
- Name: Haijian 50 (CMS 50)
- Owner: East China Sea Bureau, State Oceanic Administration
- Operator: 5th Marine Surveillance Flotilla, East China Sea Fleet, China Marine Surveillance
- Builder: Wuchang Shipbuilding
- Launched: 2011
- Commissioned: June 2011
- Decommissioned: July 2013
- Home port: Shanghai
- Fate: Transferred to Chinese coast guard

History

China
- Name: Haijing 2350; 海警2350
- Operator: China Coast Guard
- Acquired: June 2013
- In service: Yes

General characteristics
- Class & type: CSA 5/5 patrol vessel
- Displacement: 3,980 t (3,920 long tons)
- Length: 98 m (321 ft 6 in)
- Beam: 15.2 m (49 ft 10 in)
- Draft: 5 m (16 ft 5 in)
- Depth: 7.8 m (25 ft 7 in)
- Ice class: Ice Class B
- Propulsion: Azipod (diesel - electric)
- Speed: 18 knots (33 km/h; 21 mph)
- Range: 10,000 nm
- Aircraft carried: Harbin Z-9A

Haijing 2350 (Chinese: 海警2350), formerly Haijian 50 (Chinese: 海监50) is a Chinese cutter under the China Coast Guard.

== History ==
Haijian 50's construction started in February 2010 at Wuchang Shipbuilding, Wuhan, China. She was christened and commissioned in June 2011. Its design is the basis for the subsequent construction of five ships within the same 3,000-tonnage class, which Wuchang Shipbuilding received an order for in January 2013.

It was under the flag of the East China Sea Fleet from the East China Sea Bureau under the command of the State Oceanic Administration of China, which was commissioned in June 2011. It was the sister ship to Haijian 83 (commissioned in August 2005), and also the basis for the subsequent construction of five further ships within the same 3,000-tonnage class.

On September 14, 2012, Haijian 50 arrived at waters around the disputed Diaoyu Islands and started cruise operations.

In June 2013, The China Marine Surveillance was merged into the China Coast Guard. After being handed over to the China Coast Guard, Haijian 50 was renamed to Haijing 2350.

On October 3, 2014, Haijing 2350 conducted a patrol around the Diaoyu islands.

== Configuration and equipment ==
Her length, beam, and depth are 98 metres (321 ft 6 in), 15.2 metres (49 ft 10 in), and 7.8 metres (25 ft 7 in), respectively. Her maximum speed is 18 knots (33 km/h; 21 mph); her displacement is 3,980 metric tons (3,920 long tons); and her range is 10,000 nautical miles (19,000 km; 12,000 mi).

She can carry a helicopter on a helipad or in a hangar. The default helicopter model is Harbin Z-9.

She has an electrical propulsion system that relies on propellers instead of a rudder for changing direction. Auxiliary propellers give her the capability to rotate in place. She is equipped with a dynamic positioning system that can hold its position even under the conditions of a level 7 wind speed on the Beaufort scale. The vessel carries an onboard desalination system.
