= Chinese cutter Hai'an =

History

China
- Name: Haijian 84(Chinese: 中国海监84)
- Owner: South China Sea Bureau, State Oceanic Administration
- Operator: 8th Marine Surveillance Flotilla, South China Sea Fleet, China Marine Surveillance
- Builder: Wuhan Shipbuilding
- Commissioned: May 8, 2011
- Decommissioned: July 2013
- Fate: Transferred to China Coast Guard

History

China
- Name: "Hai'an"(Chinese: 海安)
- Namesake: Hai'an; Hai'an reef
- Operator: China Coast Guard
- Acquired: July 2013
- Home port: Sanya
- Identification: Pennant number: 5103 (formerly 3184)
- Status: In service

General characteristics
- Class & type: Shuwu-class cutter
- Displacement: 1,740 t
- Length: 88 m
- Beam: 12 m
- Draught: 3.581 m
- Depth: 5.6 m
- Speed: 14 knots (cruise), 18 knots (maximum)
- Range: 5,000 nm
- Complement: 50 personnel

Hai'an (5103) is a China Coast Guard cutter of the Shuwu-class cutters. She is more commonly known as Haijing 5103 or Haijing 3184 due to her current and former pennant numbers. She is a member of the 5th Bureau of the Coast Guard and is stationed in Sanya.

== Design ==
The Hai'an has a displacement of 1740 tonnes, a length of 88 meters and a speed of 14 knots. It is operated by 50 personnel. It additionally carries an Acoustic Doppler current profiler and a fathometer able to measure depths up to 5000 meters.

== History ==
Haijian 84 (Chinese: 中国海监 84) was a China Marine Surveillance (CMS) cutter in the 8th Marine Surveillance Flotilla of the South China Sea Fleet. She was commissioned on May 8, 2011 and was stationed in Guangzhou.

On October 25, 2012, Haijian 84 entered Philippine claimed Chinese territory near Huangyan lsland.

On July 2013, when the China Marine Surveillance was merged into the China Coast Guard, Haijian 84 was transferred to the China Coast Guard and renamed to Hai'an, her pennant number changing to 3184 (later changed again to 5103 between 2017 and 2022).

In 2017 the Hai'an responded to a hostage situation by pirates, rescuing 17 Chinese fishermen.

On 18 August 2022 the Hai'an rescued a Vietnamese fisherman which had fallen overboard. The fisherman was later handed to the Vietnam Coast Guard search and rescue tug CSB 9003.

On 24 January 2025, Hai'an assisted in preventing a Philippine incursion in Sandy Cay.

On 31 January 2025 Hai'an and several other China Coast Guard cutters including Nansha conducted patrols in the South China Sea.
