= Chinese cutter Hai'ou =

History

China
- Name: Haijian 75 (CMS 75)
- Owner: South China Sea Bureau, State Oceanic Administration
- Operator: 7th Marine Surveillance Flotilla, South China Sea Fleet, China Marine Surveillance
- Builder: Changzhou Shipyard, Huangpu Shipbuilding
- Commissioned: 26 October 2010
- Fate: Handed to China Coast Guard

China
- Name: Hai'ou
- Namesake: Seagull; Hai'ou island
- Operator: China Coast Guard
- Acquired: 22 July 2013
- Homeport: Guangzhou
- Identification: Hull number: 3103 (formerly 3175)
- Status: In service

General characteristics
- Class & type: 1,000 t-class Type II cutter
- Displacement: 1,290 t (1,270 long tons)
- Length: 77.39 m (253 ft 11 in)
- Beam: 10.4 m (34 ft 1 in)
- Draught: 4 m (13 ft 1 in)
- Propulsion: 4,760 shp (3,550 kW)
- Speed: maximum > 20 knots (37 km/h; 23 mph)
- Range: 5,000 nmi (9,300 km; 5,800 mi)
- Complement: 43 personnel

Hai'ou (3103) (Chinese: 海鸥舰), also known as Haijing 3103 (Chinese: 海警3103) due to its pennant number and Haijing 3175 (Chinese: 海警3175) and Haijian 75 (Chinese: 海监75) due to its former pennant numbers, is a 1000 ton type II (NATO reporting name: Shuke III-class) cutter of the China Coast Guard. It is stationed in Guangzhou and is a member of the 3rd Bureau of the China Coast Guard.

== History ==
It was commissioned in 2010 as a China Marine Surveillance (CMS) ship in the 7th Marine Surveillance Flotilla of CMS's South China Sea Fleet.

On 25 October 2012, Haijian 75 entered disputed territory claimed by both China and the Philippines during the Scarborough Shoal standoff.

During Chinese new year 2013 Haijian 75 patrolled areas near the Diaoyu islands. On 22 July 2013 the China Marine Surveillance was disbanded and merged into the China Coast Guard. Haijian 75 was handed to the Coast Guard and was renumbered to Haijing 3175 and was later renumbered again, on an unknown date to 3103. Its name was changed to Hai'ou.

On 25 January 2025, Hai'ou used its sonar to prevent Philippine Coast Guard ships from entering Chinese territory. During the same time, Hai'ou also patrolled near Huangyan Island.
