= Type 071 icebreaker =

Chinese icebreaker

Class overview
- Operators: People's Liberation Army Navy
- Succeeded by: Type 210 icebreaker
- Subclasses: 071A, 071G
- Built: 1969–1989
- In service: 1971–
- Completed: 2
- Active: 1
- Laid up: 1

General characteristics
- Displacement: 3,192 tonnes (3,142 long tons; 3,519 short tons)
- Length: 84.28 m (276 ft 6 in)
- Beam: 16 m (52 ft 6 in)
- Draft: 3.68 m (12 ft 1 in)
- Speed: 16 knots (30 km/h; 18 mph)
- Range: 10,000 nautical miles (19,000 km; 12,000 mi)
- Endurance: 30 days

Type 071 icebreaker with NATO reporting name Yanha (延哈) class is the first generation icebreaker indigenously developed in China for the People's Liberation Army Navy (PLAN). A total of two ships in three different type configurations were built and all of them have been decommissioned and replaced by Type 210 icebreaker.

In 1969, large scale icing in Bohai Sea caused great economic loss and proved that older icebreakers built before 1950 were simply too small and too old to perform icebreaking duties effectively in severe icing conditions. Chinese premier Zhou Enlai ordered that China must build icebreakers of its own design to handle the job, and accordingly, PLAN issued Order 082 for initial requirement, and Qiuxin (求新) Shipyard of Jiangnan Shipyard was assigned to do the job.From March 14 thru March 19, 1969, a team from Qiuxin Shipyard was sent to Tianjin Navigational Bureau to obtain detailed information for the design, which was submitted to PLAN and approved by PLAN Order 813. Construction begun on September 24, 1969 and the first ship was completed in just a hundred and one days. Because the program was rushed to meet the urgent need, some modifications were not incorporated in the first unit, but had to wait until the second unit to apply these changes. Consequently, the second unit with modification is re-designated as 071A (Type 071甲).Experience gained from deployment provided suggestions for further upgrade of the second unit, which was subsequently designated as 071G, with G stands for Gai (改), abbreviation for Gai-Jin (改进), meaning improvement in Chinese. This second unit after receiving modification subsequently had its named changed to Donghai (东海) 519.These ships are constructed of manganese steel (24 mm thick at bow) and are capable of breaking ice of one meter thick. Type 071 series are named as Haibing (海冰), meaning Sea Ice in Chinese, followed by a three digit number. Specification:

Type	Pennant #	Builder	Launched	Commissioned	Status	Fleet
071	Haibing 722	Jiangnan Shipyard	Dec 26, 1969	Dec 1971	Retired on Jun 7, 2013	North Sea Fleet
071A (later 071G)	Haibing 721 (later Donghai 519)	Jiangnan Shipyard	Aug 1972	Feb 1973	Converted to Type 071G and transferred to the China Coast Guard in 2013	North Sea Fleet (later China Coast Guard)

The second unit of Type 071/071A/071G series actually had lesser numerical value (721) assigned for its pennant number in comparison to the first unit (722).Due to ice-breaking is only a seasonal task, these ships are equipped with ELINT gears to be used as spy ships when they are not used for ice-breaking.The sole unit of Type 071 with Pennant # 722 retired on Jun 7, 2013, while the sole unit of Type 071A/071G was transferred to Chinese Coast Guard in 2013 to become an ice-breaking tug (TGB).
