= Chinese cutter Yijiangshan =

Chinese surveillance ship

History
- Name: Haijian 46 (CMS 46)
- Owner: East China Sea Branch, State Oceanic Administration
- Operator: 4th Marine Surveillance Flotilla, East China Sea Fleet, China Marine Surveillance
- Builder: Wuchang Shipbuilding
- Launched: April 2005
- Commissioned: May 8, 2005
- Decommissioned: July 2013
- Home port: Ningbo, Zhejiang

History

China
- Name: Yijiangshan (一江山)
- Namesake: Yijiangshan Islands
- Owner: China Coast Guard 2nd Bureau
- Acquired: 2013
- Home port: Ningbo, Zhejiang
- Identification: Pennant number: 2102 (Formerly 2146)

General characteristics
- Class & type: 1000 tonne I class (Shuyou class)
- Displacement: 1,150 metric tons
- Length: 73.9 meters
- Beam: 10.2 meters
- Draught: 3.4 meters
- Depth: 4.6 meters
- Propulsion: D683 diesel engine
- Speed: 16 knots
- Boats & landing craft carried: A 28-knot high-speed law-enforcement boat

Yijiangshan (2102), also known as Haijing 2102 or Haijing 2146 and formerly Haijian 46 (Chinese: 中国海监 46) is a 1000 tonne I class (NATO: Shuyou class) cutter of the China Coast Guard's 2nd Bureau, which is stationed in Ningbo, Zhejiang.

== Design ==
has a displacement of 1150 tonnes, a length of 73.9 meters, a beam of 10.2 meters, a depth of 4.6 meters, a draught of 3.4 meters, a speed of 16 knots and a range of over 5000 nautical miles. Additionally, there is an automatic Identification System on board.

== History ==
Haijian 46 was commissioned on May 8, 2005 and was assigned the 4th Marine Surveillance Flotilla in the China Marine Surveillance's East China Sea Fleet

She was stationed in Ningbo, Zhejiang.

On September 24, 2012, Haijian 46 was deployed in patrols near the Diaoyu islands.

In 2013, the CMS was merged into the newly established China Coast Guard, with Haijian 46 being renamed to Yijiangshan (一江山) with the new pennant number 2146. The pennant number later changed to 2102.

Yijiangshan was deployed to the Joint Sword-2024B in October 2024.
