= 1st Marine Surveillance Flotilla =

Chinese government agency division

1st Marine Surveillance Flotilla, China Marine Surveillance (Chinese: 中国海监第一支队) is under North China Sea Branch, State Oceanic Administration and North China Sea Fleet (CMS). Its main task is to administer Chinese waters in Bohai Sea and Yellow Sea. Its headquarters is at Qingdao, Shandong.
