= China Marine Surveillance =

China Marine Surveillance 中国海监
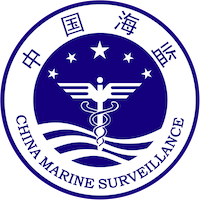
- Patch of the CMS

- Racing stripe of the China Marine Surveillance
- Abbreviation: CMS, Haijian (海监)

Agency overview
- Formed: August 23, 1982
- Preceding agency: China Marine Environment Monitoring and Surveillance Fleet
- Dissolved: March 2013
- Superseding agency: China Coast Guard

Jurisdictional structure
- National agency: China
- Operations jurisdiction: China
- Governing body: State Oceanic Administration
- Specialist jurisdiction: Coastal patrol, marine border protection, marine search and rescue

Facilities
- Ships: 400
- Aircraft: 10

China Marine Surveillance (CMS; Chinese: 中国海监; pinyin: Zhōngguó Hǎijiān) was an unarmed law enforcement agency from 1982 to 2013, under the State Oceanic Administration of the Ministry of Land and Resources of China. It was established as the China Marine Environmental Monitoring and Surveillance Fleet in 1982, renamed the China Marine Surveillance in 1999, and merged into the China Coast Guard in 2013.

== History ==
The China Marine Environment Monitoring and Surveillance Fleet (中国海洋环境监视监测船队) was established in accordance with the Marine Environmental Protection Law of the People's Republic of China, which was adopted and promulgated at the 24th meeting of the Standing Committee of the Fifth National People's Congress on August 23, 1982.

On January 13, 1999, the China Marine Surveillance was established, under the administration of the State Oceanic Administration, replacing the Chinese Marine Environment Monitoring and Surveillance Fleet.

In March 2013, under an executive order of the State Council of China, China Marine Surveillance was merged into the unified China Coast Guard.

== Overview ==
Patrol vessels from China Marine Surveillance were commonly deployed to locations in the South China Sea and East China Sea where China has territorial disputes over islands with its neighbors. The CMS has played a central role in China's in defending Chinese territories in the South China Sea, encountering opposition from Japan, the Philippines and Vietnam in the disputed territories, as China.

Unlike its successor, the China Coast Guard, the CMS was unarmed. The agency has been disbanded in July 2013 and has now been merged, along with three other similar agencies, with the China Coast Guard. Local CMS units (Provincial, Municipal and County level) still exist to this day.

The CMS, charged with the supervisory responsibility for some 3 million square kilometers of Chinese declared territorial waters, employs some 7,000 individuals and operates some 10 aircraft, including at least one Mil Mi-8 helicopter and two Harbin Y-12 utility planes, and 400 seagoing vessels.(Two Harbin Y-12 aircraft seen at Guilin airfield on a number of occasions in August 2013.) It has grown in fleet size and capability. Its fleet was made up of, in part, destroyers and other former Chinese Navy vessels.

- Headquarters: Beijing.
- North China Sea Fleet. Qingdao, Shandong.
- East China Sea Fleet. Pudong, Shanghai.
- South China Sea Fleet. Guangzhou, Guangdong.

== Organization ==
=== Fleets ===
==== North China Sea Fleet ====
The North China Sea Fleet was led by both North China Sea Bureau, State Oceanic Administration and China Marine Surveillance.

Name	Builder	Displacement	Commissioned	Home port
Haijian 01 (Chinese: 中国海监 01)		54,18	2012	
Haijian 15 (Chinese: 中国海监 15)	Wuchang Shipbuilding	1,740	January 2011	Qingdao, Shandong
Haijian 23 (Chinese: 中国海监 23)		Renamed Haijing 1123		
Haijian 26 (Chinese: 中国海监 26)		1125	April 2011	Qingdao, Shandong
Haijian 110 (Chinese: 中国海监 110)		3,000	November 2012	
Haijian 111 (Chinese: 中国海监 111)		5,000	November 2012	
Haijian 112 (Chinese: 中国海监 112)				
Haijian 137 (Chinese: 中国海监 137)		3,000	November 2012	
Haijian 167 (Chinese: 中国海监 167)				
Haijian 168 (Chinese: 中国海监 168)				
Haijian 169 (Chinese: 中国海监 169)				
Haijian 852 (Chinese: 中国海监 852)				

==== East China Sea Fleet ====
The East China Sea Fleet was led by both East China Sea Bureau, State Oceanic Administration and China Marine Surveillance.

Name	Builder	Displacement	Commissioned	Home port
Haijian 41 (中国海监41)		201.51		
Haijian 44 (中国海监44)		201.51		
Haijian 46 (中国海监46)	Wuchang Shipbuilding	1,101	April 2005	Ningbo, Zhejiang
Haijian 47 (中国海监47)		656.66	September 1973	Ningbo, Zhejiang
Haijian 49 (中国海监49)		996.7	Around 1997	Ningbo, Zhejiang
Haijian 50 (中国海监50)		3,336		Shanghai
Haijian 51 (中国海监51)	Wuchang Shipbuilding	1,937	November 2005	Shanghai
Haijian 52 (中国海监52)		2,421	2000	Shanghai
Haijian 53 (中国海监53)		284		
Haijian 66 (中国海监66)	Huangpu Shipbuilding	1,290		

==== South China Sea Fleet ====
The South China Sea Fleet was led by both South China Sea Bureau, State Oceanic Administration and China Marine Surveillance.

Name	Builder	Displacement	Commissioned	Home port
Haijian 27 (中国海监27)		1,200		
Haijian 71 (Chinese: 中国海监71)	Wuchang Shipbuilding	1,111		Haizhu, Guangzhou, Guangdong
Haijian 72 (Chinese: 中国海监72)	Wuchang Shipbuilding	898.8		Haizhu, Guangzhou, Guangdong
Haijian 73 (Chinese: 中国海监73)	Guangzhou Shipbuilding	1,118		Haizhu, Guangzhou, Guangdong
Haijian 74 (Chinese: 中国海监74)	Wuchang Shipbuilding	996		Haizhu, Guangzhou, Guangdong
Haijian 75 (Chinese: 中国海监75)	Huangpu Shipbuilding	1,290	October 2010	Haizhu, Guangzhou, Guangdong
Haijian 78 (中国海监78)				
Haijian 79 (中国海监79)				
Haijian 83 (中国海监83)		3,980		
Haijian 84 (中国海监84)	Wuchang Shipbuilding	1,740	May 2011	Guangzhou, Guangdong
Haijian 88 (中国海监88)				

=== Provincial units ===
Unlike the National level China Marine Surveillance fleets, many local governments remained their own CMS fleets.

==== Guangdong ====
The China Marine Surveillance Guangdong Provincial Fleet (中国海监广东省总队) was formerly a fleet of the CMS operating in Guangdong.

The CMS Guangdong Fleet and its successor the Guangdong CMLE assisted in prevention of the COVID-19 pandemic's spread.

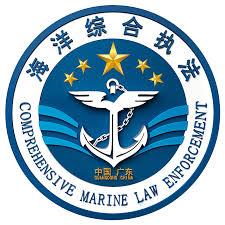
Emblem of the Guangdong Provincial Comprehensive Marine Law Enforcement

On November 16, 2020, the China Marine Surveillance Guangdong Fleet was merged with the Guangdong Fisheries Law Enforcement Fleet (广东省渔政总队) to form the Guangdong Provincial Comprehensive Marine Law Enforcement (广东省海洋综合执法总队), inheriting the ships of both agencies and is responsible for maritime law enforcement, search and rescue along with fisheries control. It is under the control of the Guangdong Provincial Agriculture and Rural Affairs Department.

The Guangdong CMLE operates 3 flotillas, and is headquartered in 10 Nancun Road, Haizhu District, Guangzhou:

- 1st Flotilla, with jurisdiction over Shantou, Huizhou, Shanwei, Jieyang and Shantou
- 2nd Flotilla, also known as the Guangdong CMLE Central Guangdong patrol base
- 3rd Flotilla, with jurisdiction over Zhanjiang, Maoming and Yangjiang

===== Ships =====
Name	Ship class	Launched	Flotilla
Haijian 9020 (中国海监9020)	1000 tonne class	2013-06-25	
Haijian 9030 (中国海监9030)	1000 tonne class	2013-06-25	
Haijian 9068 (中国海监9068)		October 2014	3

===== Helicopters =====
- B7072 - Avicopter AC301

==== Guangxi ====
The China Marine Surveillance Guangxi Autonomous Region Fleet (中国海监广西壮族自治区总队), under the Guangxi Autonomus Region Oceanic Administration (广西自治区海洋局) is Guangxi's own CMS fleet and is still active as of 2022, conducting patrols in the Beibu gulf against smugglers and illegal migrants from Vietnam.

===== Ships =====
Ship name	Chinese name
Haijian 1118	中国海监1118
Haijian 1119	中国海监1119
Haijian 1121	中国海监1121
Haijian 1126	中国海监1126

== See also ==
- Maritime law enforcement agencies in China
- People's Armed Police
- People's Liberation Army Navy
