= Sandy Cay (South China Sea) =

Coral reef in the Spratly Islands, West Philippines Sea

Disputed island
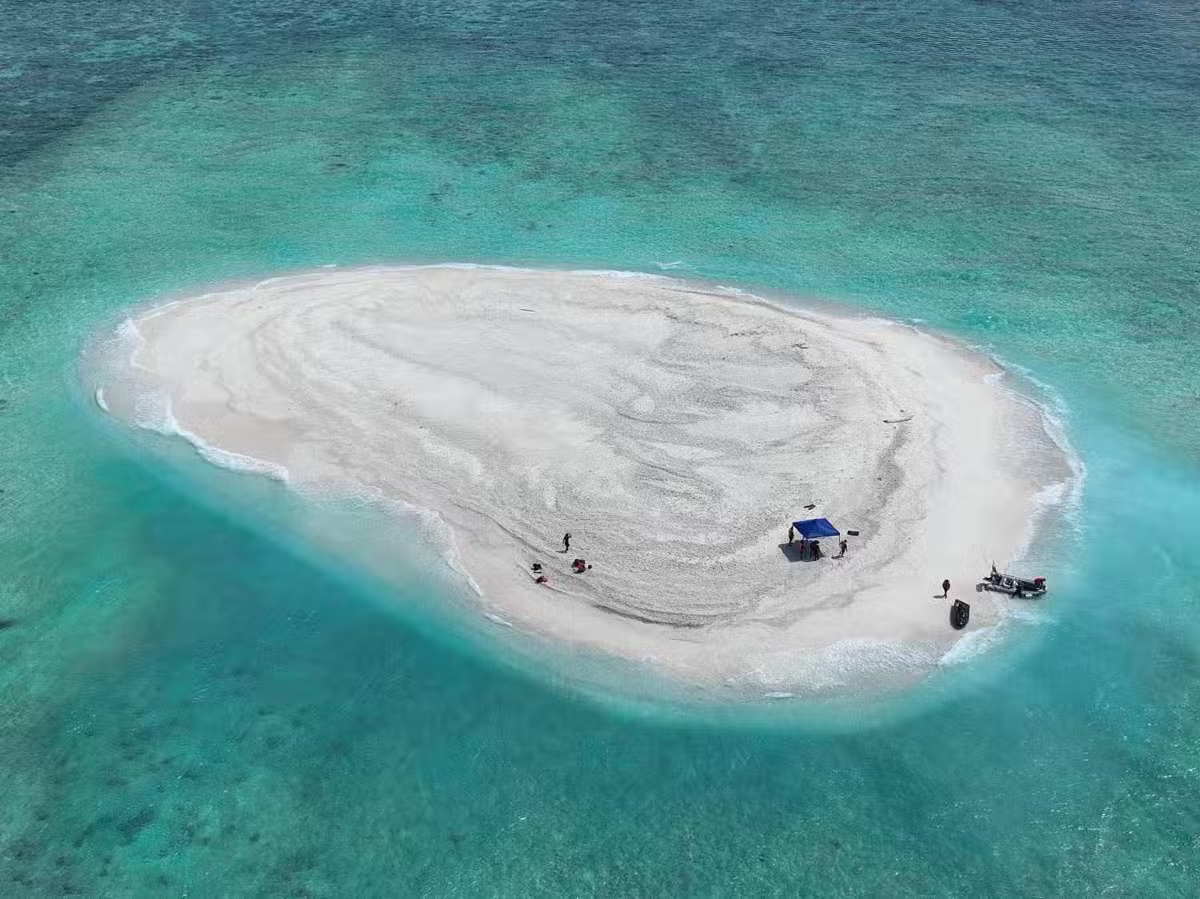
- One of the four Sandy Cay reefs

- Location within Philippines
- Other names: 铁线中礁 Tiěxiànzhong Jiao / 铁线礁 Tiěxiàn Jiāo (Chinese); Pag-asa Cay 2 (Filipino); Đá Hoài Ân (Vietnamese)

Geography
- Location: South China Sea
- Coordinates: 11°03′36.0″N 114°13′08.0″E
- Archipelago: Spratly Islands

Claimed by
- China
- City: Sansha, Hainan
- Philippines
- Municipality: Kalayaan, Palawan
- Republic of China (Taiwan)
- Municipality District: Kaohsiung; Cijin
- Vietnam
- District: Trường Sa, Khánh Hòa

Sandy Cay is a small coral reef in the northern Thitu Reefs of the Spratly Islands, South China Sea. It consists of multiple shallow reef platforms with dynamic sandbanks and is claimed by China, the Philippines, Taiwan, and Vietnam. Sandy Cay Reef lies approximately 1.5 nautical miles northwest of Thitu Island and 9.3 nautical miles northeast of Subi Reef within the western atoll rim of the Thitu Reefs.

In 2017, the Philippines planned to build shelter for fishermen in the maritime feature. This plan was halted after China opposed the plan in August. Filipino foreign secretary Alan Peter Cayetano informed President Rodrigo Duterte believing that such action would be a violation of the 2002 Declaration on the Conduct of Parties in the South China Sea. Duterte stated he received assurance from China that it will not occupy the reef. Since then the feature has remained unoccupied by any claimant country, but Chinese maritime vessels have loitered around its vicinity.

In mid-April 2025, the China Coast Guard conducted a landing on the reef to "exercise sovereign jurisdiction," raising a Chinese flag on the sandbank and was reported as a seizure of the maritime feature. This however, was disputed by the Philippine Navy and Coast Guard who said they went there afterwards but found nothing there, and the reef itself is not under Chinese control. The Philippines also raised their national flag. Both landings were officially objected to by Vietnam.
