= State Oceanic Administration =

Chinese administrative agency

- 国家海洋局; Guójiā Hǎiyáng Jú
- Logo of the State Oceanic Administration

Agency overview
- Formed: 4 January 1964
- Dissolved: 19 March 2018
- Jurisdiction: China
- Agency executive: Wang Hong, Director
- Parent department: Ministry of Land and Resources
- Website: soa.gov.cn (archived)

The State Oceanic Administration (SOA; Chinese: 国家海洋局; pinyin: Guójiā Hǎiyáng Jú) was an administrative agency subordinate to the Ministry of Land and Resources, responsible for the supervision and management of sea area in the People's Republic of China and coastal environmental protection, protecting national maritime rights and organizing scientific and technical research of its territorial waters.

== History ==
In March 2018, the 13th National People's Congress announced that the newly formed Ministry of Natural Resources will replace the functions of the Ministry of Land & Resources, State Oceanic Administration and the State Bureau of Surveying and Mapping as part of the deepening the reform of the Party and state institutions. The environmental policy functions of the SOA were transferred to the Ministry of Ecology and Environment (MEE).

== Functions ==
The main functions of the agency were:

1. The State Oceanic Administration is responsible for regulating the coastal zone of the People's Republic of China. This include islands, internal sea, neighboring sea, contiguous zone, continental shelf, exclusive economic zones and other sea area under its jurisdiction.
2. It is also responsible for issuing permits for sea area use such as laying of submarine cables and pipelines.
3. The SOA is also for environmental protection of the marine area. This include regulating pollutants, discharges into the sea and monitoring of the health of the sea areas. The agency assesses marine oil and gas exploration and developments, ocean dumping and ocean engineering projects to ensure the environmental impact is minimized and regulations are followed.
4. The agency organises and regulates marine scientific surveys and research activities. This can involve approving research from foreign countries or foreign nationals.
5. The agency is the Law enforcement agency protecting the maritime and sea area. This involve coastal surveillance, investigation and prosecution of illegal activities.
6. The administration also organizes basic and comprehensive survey of the maritime area to promote scientific research and understanding of the environment for protection, economic activity or conservation.

== Administration ==
The agency was organized in the following departments.

=== Internal departments ===
- Administrative Office (Department of Finance)
- Department of Policies, Laws and Regulations, and Planning
- Department of Sea Area Management
- Department of Marine Environmental Protection
- Department of Science and Technology
- Department of International Cooperation
- Department of Personnel
- Party Committee of the Headquarters of the SOA
- Office of Commission for Discipline Inspection and Supervisor of the SOA

=== Subordinate agencies ===
The following agencies that were subordinate to the State Ocean Administration:

- Northern Seas Branch (Qingdao)
- East China Sea Branch (Shanghai)
- South China Sea Branch (Guangzhou)
- National Marine Data and Information Service (Tianjin)
- National Marine Environmental Monitoring Center (Dalian)
- National Marine Environmental Forecasting Center (Beijing)
- National Center for Satellite Application in the Oceans (Beijing)
- Institute of Ocean Technology (Tianjin)
- National Center of Oceanographic Standards & Metrology (Tianjin)
- China Institute of Polar Research (Shanghai)
- Hangzhou Research and Development Center for Water Treatment Technologies (Hangzhou)
- First Institute of Oceanography (Qingdao)
- Second Institute of Oceanography (Hangzhou)
- Third Institute of Oceanography (Xiamen)
- Tianjin Institute of Sea Water Desalination and Multipurpose Utilization (Tianjin)
- Institute for Ocean Development Strategy (Beijing)
- Marine Advisory Service Center (Beijing)
- Office of Polar Expedition (Beijing)
- Office of China Ocean Mineral Resources Research and Development Association (Beijing)
- China Ocean Press (Beijing)
- Office of Retired Staff and Veteran Cadres (Beijing)
- Service Center of the Headquarters of the SOA (Beijing)
- Beijing Training and Education Center (Beijing)

=== Former Agencies ===
- China Coast Guard (transferred to People's Armed Police on July 1, 2018)

== International collaboration ==
Several subordinated agencies collaborate actively with the University of the Arctic. UArctic is an international cooperative network based in the Circumpolar Arctic region, consisting of more than 200 universities, colleges, and other organizations with an interest in promoting education and research in the Arctic region.

== List of directors ==
No.	Name	Took office	Left office
1	Qi Yong (齐勇)	1964	1968
vacant
2	Shen Zhendong (沈振东)	1977	1982
3	Luo Yuru (罗钰如)	1982	1985
4	Yan Hongmo (严宏谟)	1985	1995
5	Zhang Dengyi (张登义)	1995	2000
6	Wang Shuguang (王曙光)	2000	2005
7	Sun Zhihui (孙志辉)	2005	2011
8	Liu Cigui (刘赐贵)	2011	2015
9	Wang Hong (王宏)	2015	2018
