= Structure of the People's Armed Police =

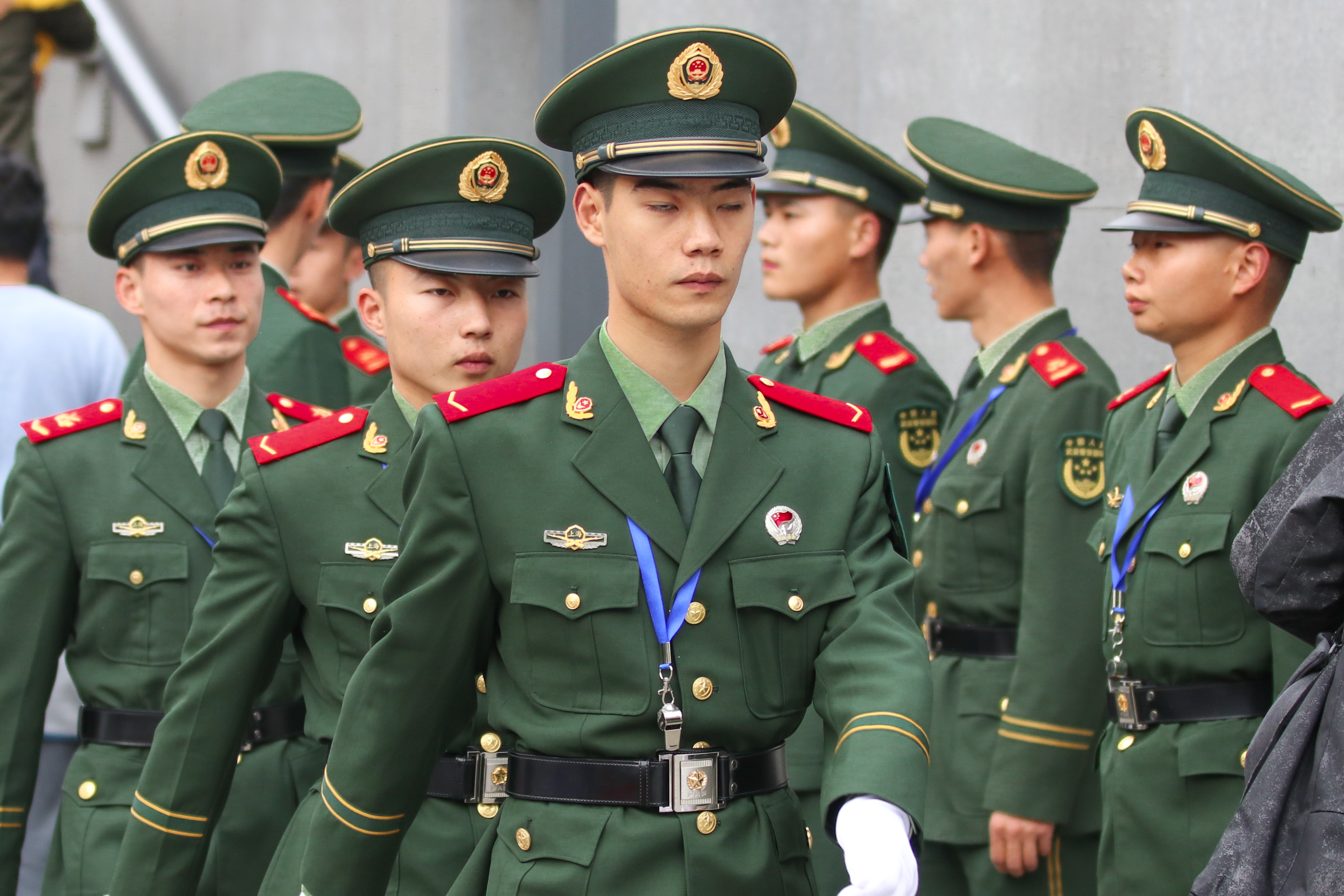
People's Armed Police enlisted personnel in Shanghai

The structure of the People's Armed Police is complex, and has highly varied over time. While the majority of PAP units are involved in standard policing and gendarmerie duties, the PAP has also included at different times unique specialised units.

The People's Armed Police was established in 1982, taking over duties from previous units and formations that directly under the command of the People's Liberation Army. The PAP reports directly to the Central Military Commission (CMC) of the Chinese Communist Party (CCP).

== Headquarters organisation ==
The People's Armed Police Headquarters is the leading and commanding organ that directs and administers all the units and provides guidance to it. The PAP has a commander, a political commissar and several deputy commanders and deputy political commissars. The PAP also has departments responsible for logistical and political matters and several speciality departments.

Following adjustment and reorganisation, the People's Armed Police is mainly composed of the territorial forces, the mobile forces, and the Coast Guard.

The People's Armed Police Headquarters, placed at Theater Command Grade, include five Departments directly under the Headquarters:

- Staff Department (Deputy Theater Command Grade);
  - Training Bureau (Division Leader Grade);
  - Intelligence Bureau (Division Leader Grade), led by Zhang Xiaoqi;
- Political Work Department (Deputy Theater Command Grade): led by Director Lieutenant general Gao Wei;
  - Propaganda Bureau (Division Leader Grade);
  - Soldier and Civilian Personnel Bureau (Division Leader Grade);
- Discipline Inspection Commission (Deputy Theater Command Grade);
- Logistics Department (Corps Leader Grade);
- Equipment Department (Corps Leader Grade).

Being of Theatre Command Grade, the People's Armed Police is led by a full General.

== Mobile corps ==
Mobile corps (Chinese: 机动总队; pinyin: jīdòng zǒngduì), often mistranslated as "Contingents" are large formations without fixed areas of responsibility. Two were created after the 2018 reforms; most of the subordinate units came from the 14 disbanded mobile divisions. Mobile corps are corps leader grade formations commanded by major generals.

The mobile corps are mainly responsible for dealing with terrorism, violent crime, riots, and public security threats.

=== 1st Mobile Corps ===
The 1st Mobile Corps is based in Shijiazhuang, Hebei, south of Beijing. The Corps covers northern and central China, including Beijing. The 1st Mobile Corps consists of:

- Nine mobile detachments (Panjin, Liaoning; Shenyang, Liaoning; Bayisingtu, Inner Mongolia; Tianjin; Dingzhou, Hebei; Baoding, Hebei; Jinzhong, Shanxi; Zhengzhou, Henan; Pingliang, Gansu);
- Three Special Operations detachments (Beijing; Tianjin; Shijiazhuang);
- Two Transportation detachments (Beijing and Xi’an, Shaanxi);
- One Engineering/Chemical Defence detachment (Huludao, Liaoning);
- One Helicopter detachment with 3 Groups

=== 2nd Mobile Corps ===
The 2nd Mobile Corps is headquartered in Fuzhou, with units concentrated in Fujian and surrounding provinces along the coast (covering eastern and southern China). The 2nd Mobile Corps consists of:

- Nine mobile detachments (Wuyi, Jiangsu; Putian, Fujian; Guangzhou; Foshan, Guangdong; Mengzi, Yunnan; Nanchong, Sichuan);
- Two Special Operations detachments (Guangzhou(Snow Leopard Commando Unit) and Huzhou, Zhejiang);
- Three Transportation detachments (Hefei, Anhui; Mianyang, Sichuan; Linzhi, Tibet);
- One Engineering/Chemical Defense detachment (Fuzhou, Fujian);
- One Helicopter detachment with 3 Groups

The incumbent Commander is Major General Chen Hongwu, while the Political Commissar is Major General Yang Zhenguo.

== Internal security forces ==
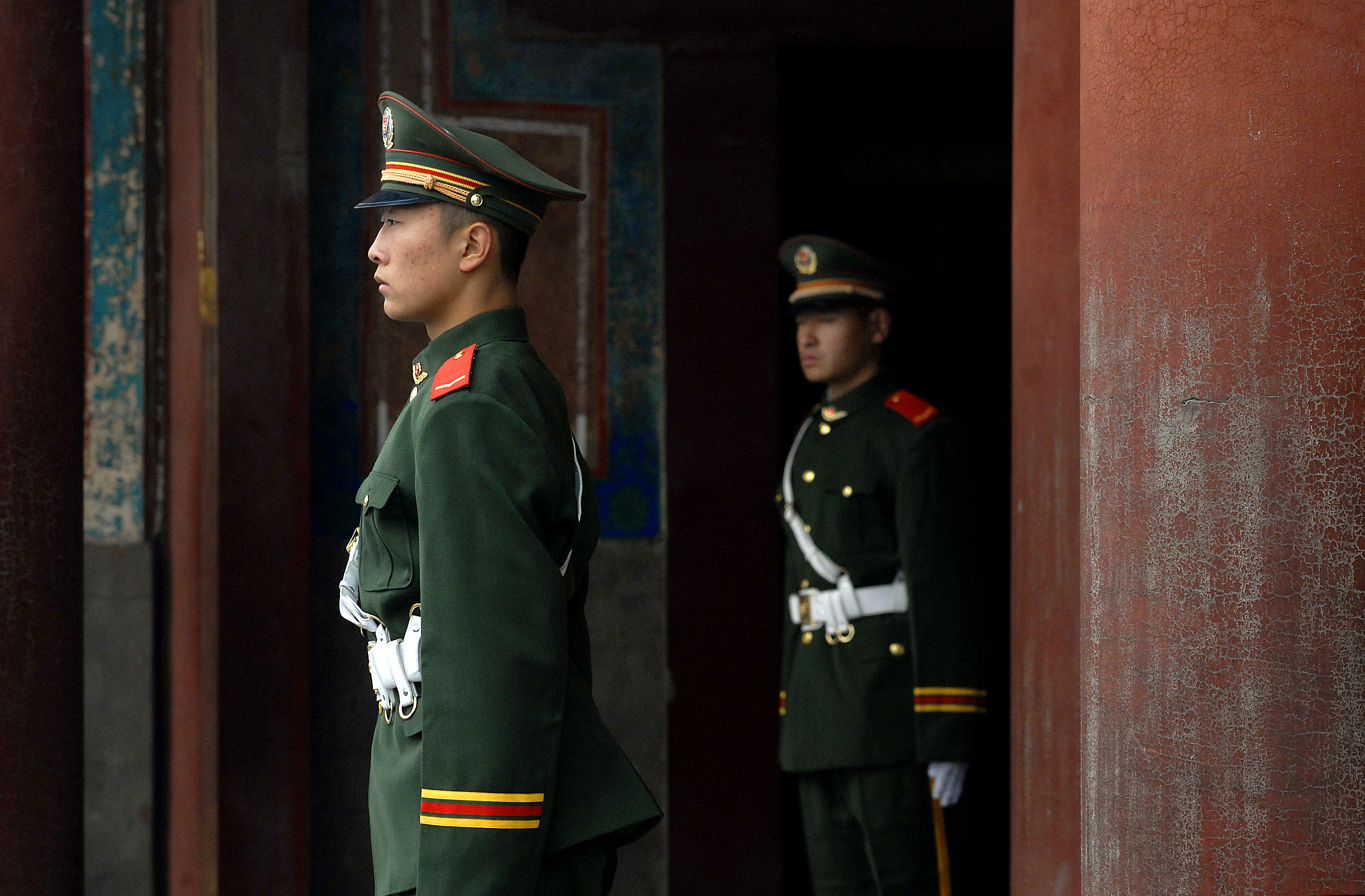
Enlsited personnel of the Beijing Corps on duty at the Palace Museum in 2007.

The major part of the PAP is the nèiwèi bùduì (Chinese: 内卫部队); translations include "internal security forces", "internal security troops", and "internal guards corps". Internal security forces are divided into provincial-level formations with geographical areas of responsibility. They are subordinated to PAP headquarters; the 2017-2018 reforms removed control of PAP units from local government. Internal security forces are focused on domestic security missions, maintaining stability in western China, guarding government compounds, disaster relief, and responding to major anti-government unrest.

The zǒngduì (Chinese: 总队) is the provincial formation. They are called "corps" by the PAP; Western analysts have used "contingent", "general corps", and "detachment". Most are corps deputy leader grade formations. The exceptions are the Beijing and Xinjiang corps which are corps leader grade; their subordinate entities, except for the logistics and equipment bureaus, are one grade higher than in the other corps. Hong Kong and Macau do not have corps. Corps have mobile detachments and duty detachments (Chinese: 执勤支队; pinyin: zhíqín zhīduì).

Duty detachments protect government compounds and perform routine duties; they may exist because the CCP lacks confidence in the ability of local public security forces to handle "mass incidents".

Mobile detachments (Chinese: 机动支队; pinyin: jīdòng zhīduì) are rapid reaction units roughly corresponding to PLAGF regiments. Some were existing corps mobile units before the reforms. Most were transferred from the disbanded mobile divisions. Most corps have one. In general, western provinces with large non-Han population have more than those in China's interior.

Corps are further subdivided at lower administrative levels. Regimental-level detachments (Chinese: 支队; pinyin: zhīduì) are found in provinces, prefectures, and specifically designated cities. Battalions (Chinese: 大队; pinyin: dadui) are located in districts of the important cities and counties. Companies (Chinese: 中队; pinyin: zhōngduì) are found in counties. All corps have subordinate elementary command colleges.

=== List of provincial corps ===
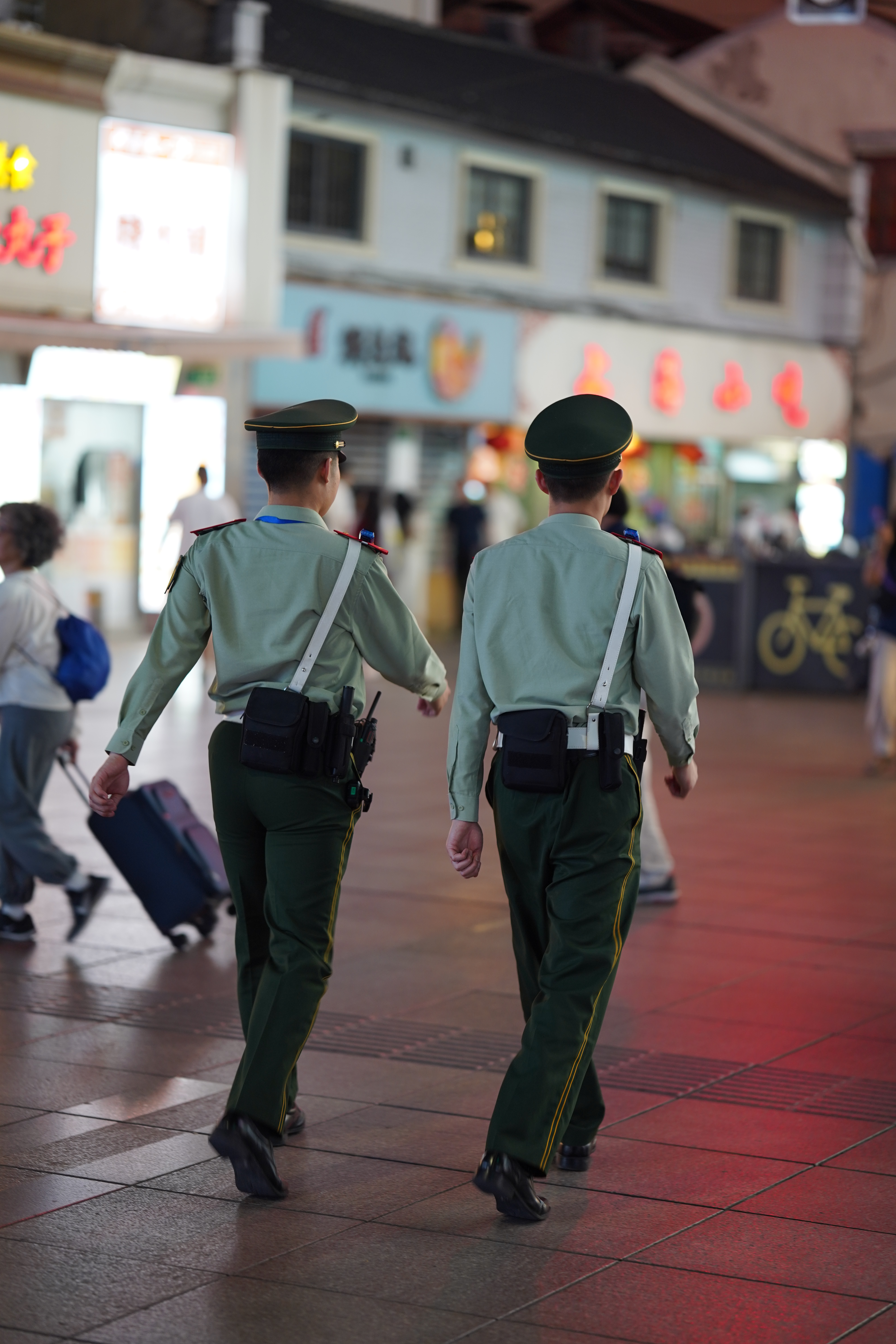
Two police personnel of the Jiangsu Corps patrolling in Nanjing

- Anhui Corps
- Beijing Corps
  - 4 mobile detachments
- Chongqing Corps
- Fujian Corps
- Gansu Corps
- Guangdong Corps
- Guangxi Corps
- Guizhou Corps
- Hainan Corps
- Hebei Corps
- Heilongjiang Corps

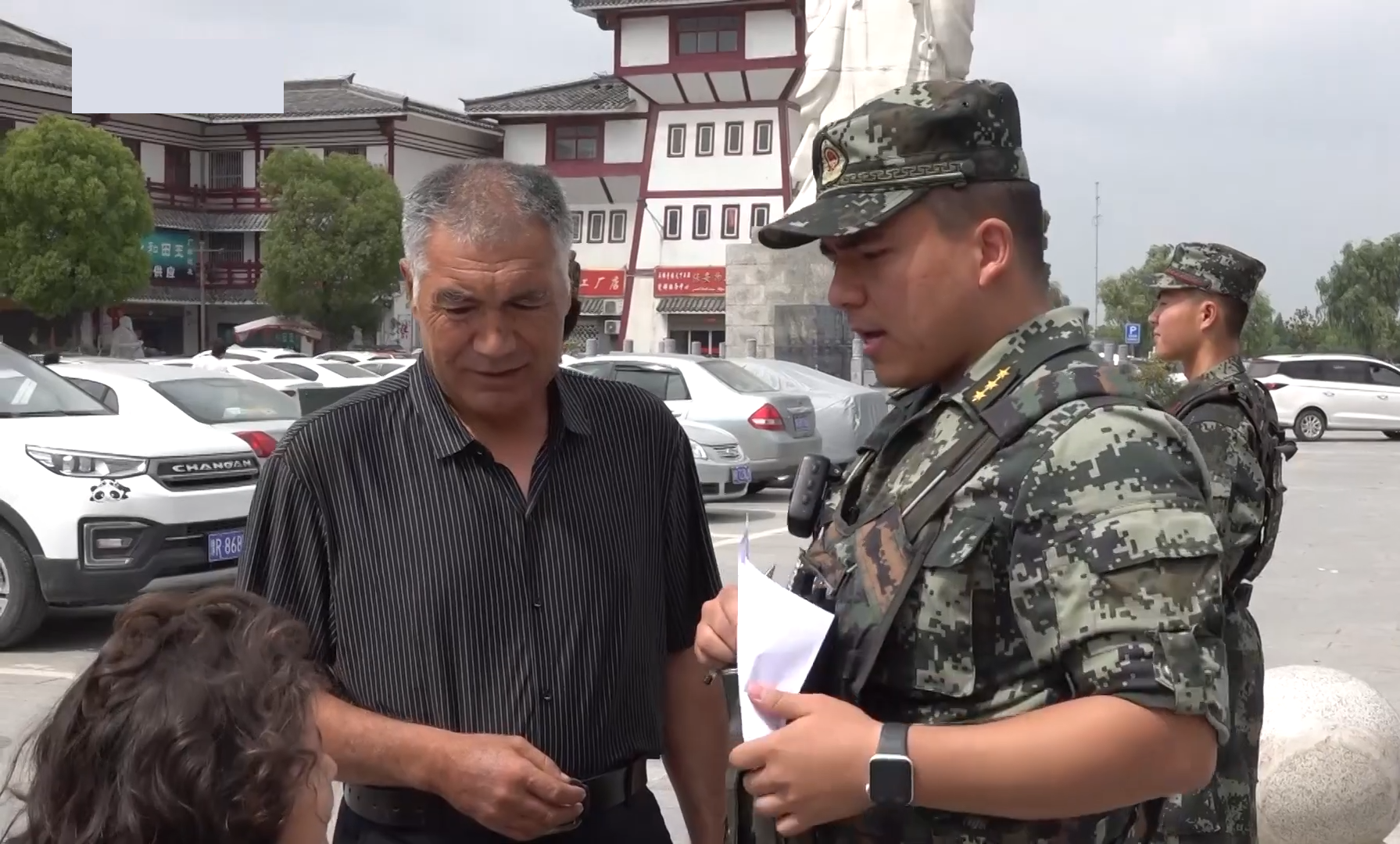
Uyghur Shàngwèi of Henan Corps interacting with the public

- Henan Corps
- Hubei Corps
- Hunan Corps
- Inner Mongolia Corps
- Jiangsu Corps
- Jiangxi Corps
- Jilin Corps
- Liaoning Corps
- Ningxia Corps
- Qinghai Corps
  - Two mobile detachments
- Shaanxi Corps
- Shanxi Corps
- Shandong Corps
- Shanghai Corps
  - Two mobile detachments

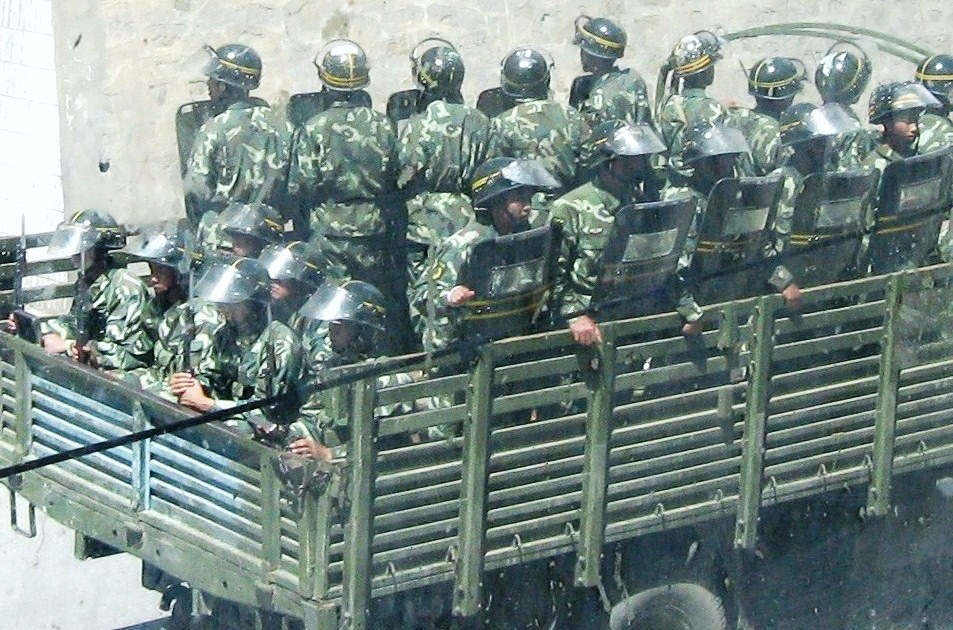
Police personnel from the Sichuan Corps in riot gear

- Sichuan Corps
  - Four mobile detachments
- Tibet Corps
  - Three mobile detachments
- Tianjin Corps
- Yunnan Corps
  - Three mobile detachments
- Xinjiang Corps
  - Seven mobile detachments
- XPCC Corps (Not to be confused with the XPCC itself)
- Zhejiang Corps

== Transportation units ==
Prior to the 2018 reforms, the People's Armed Police Transportation Corps (Chinese: 武警交通部队) was its own independent corps under the dual command of the PAP and the Ministry of Transport. During the 2018 reforms, the Transportation Corps was reorganised into part of the 1st and 2nd mobile corps. The mission of Transport units of the People's Armed Police is to conduct disaster relief and emergency repair on highways, bridges, tunnels, seaports railways and airports, security to construction projects related to national security along with law enforcement duties on highways in border regions.

=== History ===
The lineage of the 1st Transportation Detachment, 2nd Mobile Corps dates back to the 2nd World War, when it was known as the Laiyuan guerilla detachment of the Jin-Cha-Ji Military district. It participated in the Chinese civil war, WW2 and the Korean war. After becoming part of the PLA Basic Engineering Corps it was deployed to build the Duku Highway in 1974 in which 47 personnel lost their lives.

Prior to 1984, the transportation corps was part of the People's Liberation Army Basic Engineering Corps.

The 7th Transportation Detachment assisted in disaster relief after the 2015 Tianjin explosions.

The 6th Detachment of the transportation corps deployed 105 officers and 48 vehicles for urban search and rescue duties during the 2015 Shenzhen landslide.

=== Organisation (Pre-2018) ===
- Transportation Corps Headquarters
  - Logistics office - Headquarters in 21 Huixin West Street, Chaoyang district, Beijing
- 1st Transportation Corps
  - 1st Transportation Detachment
  - 2nd Transportation Detachment
  - 3rd Transportation Detachment
- 2nd Transportation Corps - Headquartered in Kashgar
  - 4th Transportation Detachment
  - 5th Transportation Detachment
  - 6th Transportation Detachment
  - 7th Transportation Detachment - Headquartered in Qinhuangdao
  - 8th Transportation Detachment - Jurisdiction area Xinjiang-Tibet Highway between Rutog County and Saga County

=== Organisation (Post-2018) ===
After the 2018 reforms, the transportation corps was reorganised into 5 detachments in the 1st and 2nd Mobile Corps:

- 1st Transportation Detachment, 1st Mobile Corps - Stationed in Beijing
- 2nd Transportation Detachment, 1st Mobile Corps - Stationed in Chang'an District, Xi'an
- 1st Transportation Detachment, 2nd Mobile Corps- Stationed in Hefei, Anhui
- 2nd Transportation Detachment, 2nd Mobile Corps - Stationed in Mianyang, Sichuan
- 3rd Transportation Detachment, 2nd Mobile Corps - Stationed in Bomê County, Nyingchi, Tibet Autonomous Region

=== Controversy ===
In 2015, ex-Transportation corps commander Major General Liu Zhanqi, ex-Transportation corps Political commissar Major General Wang Xin and ex-Transportation Corps Chief engineer Major General Miao Guirong were arrested on 16 June, 31 July and 15 September respectively on corruption-related charges as part of the anti-corruption campaign under Xi Jinping. As of 16 September 2015, a total of 43 people were arrested in relation to the case.

== China Coast Guard ==
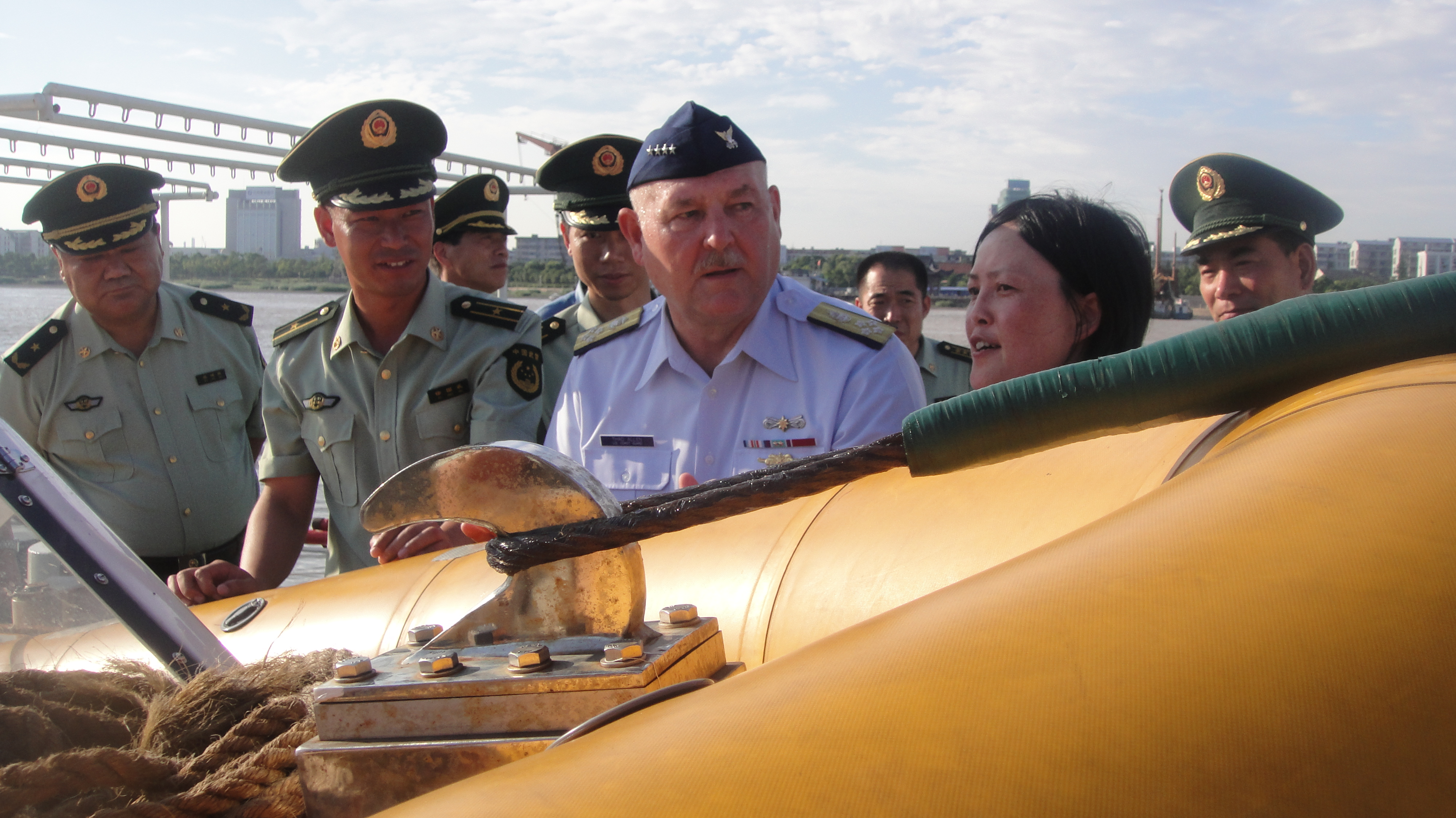
Thad Allen of the US Coast Guard visiting the China Coast Guard Academy in 2009

The Chinese People's Armed Police Coast Guard Bureau, also abbreviated as China Coast Guard is the agency for maritime search and rescue and law enforcement in the territorial waters of the People's Republic of China. The China Coast Guard was formerly the maritime branch of the People's Armed Police (PAP) Border Security Force under the Ministry of Public Security until 2013. In March 2013, China announced it would form a unified Coast Guard commanded by the State Oceanic Administration. This renewed Coast Guard has been in operation since July 2013. As of 1 July 2018, the China Coast Guard was transferred from civilian control of the State Council and the State Oceanic Administration, to the People's Armed Police, ultimately placing it under the command of the Central Military Commission (CMC).

According to Joel Wuthnow of the Institute for National Strategic Studies, the Coast Guard Command within the People's Armed Police possibly is of Corps Leader Grade, led by a Commandant who usually holds the rank of major general.

In June 2018, China Coast Guard was granted maritime rights and law enforcement akin civilian law enforcement agencies in order to carry out contrast of illegal activities, keep peace and order, as well as safeguarding security at sea, when performing duties related to the use of marine resources, protection of marine environment, regulation of fishery, and anti-smuggling.

There are currently 3 regional bureaus:

- East Sea Bureau
- South Sea Bureau
- North Sea Bureau

== Special Operations units ==
The People's Armed Police maintains several Special Operations Units, also known by Western sources as "Special Police units". They were established in Beijing in early 1980s and in 1983 the first of them was transferred to the People's Armed Police as the People's Armed Police Special Police Group. In 1985 the Group became People's Armed Police Special Police School and, in 2002, it became the People's Armed Police Special Police Academy. In 2002, the Snow Wolf Commando Unit, since 2007 Snow Leopard Commando Unit, was established in Beijing as the second special police unit. According to Joel Wuthnow, the Snow Leopard Commando Unit was moved from the Beijing Corps to the 2nd Mobile Corps in 2018.

The special operations units are tasked to carry out counter terrorism missions, riot control, anti-hijacking and bomb disposal.

Local special operations units receive Explosive Ordinance Disposal (EOD) training, fast roping, counterinsurgency tactics, along with training in hostage rescue and hostage negotiation.

=== Organisation ===
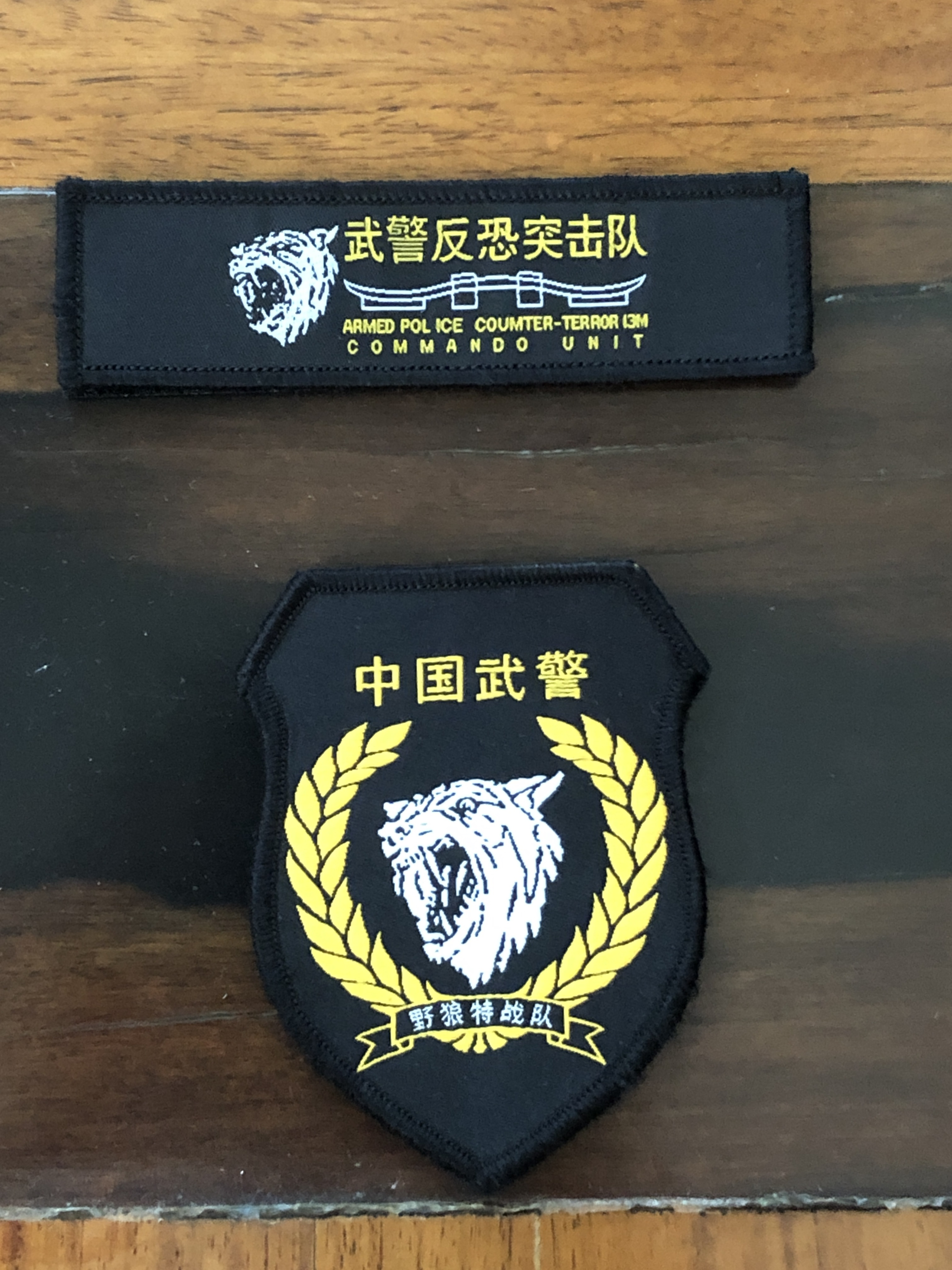
Insignia of the Wild Wolf unit

Special Police Units/Special operations units are organised and placed at the Municipal and Provincial level.

In addition, the 1st and 2nd Mobile Corps maintain a total of 5 Special Operations Detachments.

Municipal detachments each have their own Special Operations Company, which is typically placed under the municipal mobile battalion. Each provincial corps (Chinese: 总队; pinyin: Zǒngduì) establishes and maintains a special operations detachment as part of its own territorial organisation. The provincial special operations detachment of the Xinjiang Corps is the Mountain Eagle Commando Unit. In some provincial corps, the special operations unit is battalion or company sized and is placed under the mobile detachment.

The Hebei Corps Mobile Detachment's 1st Special Operations Company is known as the "Sky Sword" unit (Chinese: 天剑突击队). It can trace its lineage back to the 7th Company, 3rd Battalion of the 28th Group Army's 84th Infantry Division's 251st Regiment which was involved in the Battle of Jinan and the Huaihai campaign. In its entire history, it was deployed to approximately 50 law enforcement/disaster relief operations, won gold or silver in 100+ competitions and was awarded first class meritorious service medals 1 time, 2nd class meritorious service medals 5 times and 3rd class meritorious service medals 12 times.

The Shenzhen Detachment's Special Operations Company is known as the "Wild Wolf" unit (Chinese: 野狼特战队). It was founded in 2005 and given the name in 2008.

The Jinan Detachment's Special Operations Company is known as the "Lightning Commando Unit" (Chinese: 闪电突击队) it was founded in 2009 and only had 30 members at the start.

==== Mobile units ====
- 1st Special Operations Detachment, 1st Mobile Corps (Falcon Commando Unit, stationed in Beijing)
- 2nd Special Operations Detachment, 1st Mobile Corps (Overseas Guards Special Operations Detachment, stationed in Tianjin)
- 3rd Special Operations Detachment, 1st Mobile Corps (stationed in Shijiazhuang)
- 1st Special Operations Detachment, 2nd Mobile Corps (Snow Leopard Commando Unit, stationed in Guangzhou)
- 2nd Special Operations Detachment, 2nd Mobile Corps (stationed in Huzhou)

=== Border Defense Corps Special Operations units ===
Badge of the Snowy Eagle Female Special Service team
- https://photo.81.cn/pla/2015-03/19/content_6398233_5.htm

Flag of the Snowy Eagle Female Special Service team
- https://photo.81.cn/pla/2015-03/19/content_6398233_8.htm

In April 2012, the Xinjiang Border Defense Corps Female Special Service team (新疆公安边防总队女子特勤分队) was founded. In March 2015 it was renamed to the "Snowy Eagle Female Special Service team" (雪鹰女子特勤分队) at the Xinjiang Border Corps Training Base. At its founding in 2012, it only had 6 members, and by March 2015 it had 34 members. It assisted in security at the China Eurasia Expo multiple times.

The Shenzhen Border Defense Detachment operated the Maritime Special Service Team (Nicknamed "Maritime Jiaolongs"), a police tactical unit which is dedicated to maritime anti-terrorism, search and rescue, combat diving and VBSS.

== Former units ==
With the 2018 reforms, Specialist Corps other than the Transportation Corps have been placed under other ministries, while the China Coast Guard (CCG) was transferred from State Council to PAP command, and the Transportation Corps has some units under the Mobile Corps.

The Border Defense Corps and Guards Corps have been absorbed by the Ministry of Public Security (MPS). The Forestry Corps were merged with the China Fire Services (also known as the firefighting corps) of the MPS and reorganised as China Fire and Rescue (CF&R), it was placed under the Ministry of Emergency Management. The Gold Corps and Hydropower Corps have been transformed into state-owned enterprises under the supervision of the relevant State Council ministries (Ministry of Natural Resources and China National Gold Group Corporation and China Aneng Construction Corporation, respectively).

=== Ministry of Public Security Active Service Forces ===
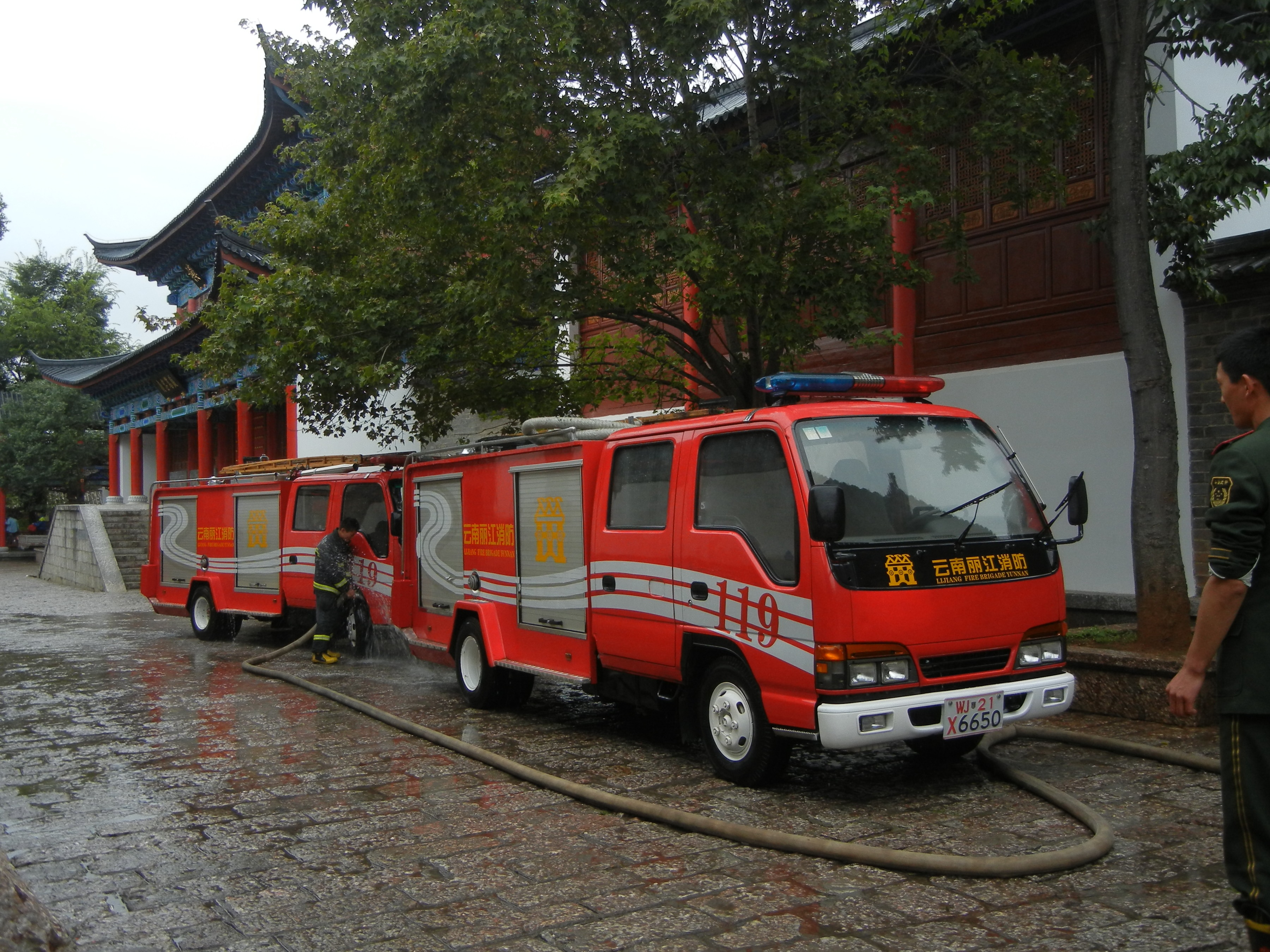
PAP personnel of the China Fire Services washing fire trucks in Lijiang Old Town

The MPSASF were agencies of the Ministry of Public Security who were manned by People's Armed Police Personnel. The three corps of the MPSASF were the Border Defense Corps in charge of border patrol and immigration inspection, the Guard Corps in charge of VIP protection and the protection of provincial leaders, and the China Fire Services (also known as the Firefighting Corps) which was the primary firefighting agency prior to 2018. After the Deepening the reform of the Party and state institutions in 2018, Border Defense Corps and Guard Corps personnel became People's Police personnel, while the China Fire Services were merged with the People's Armed Police Forestry Corps and became China Fire and Rescue, making the use of the term defunct.

=== Forestry Corps ===
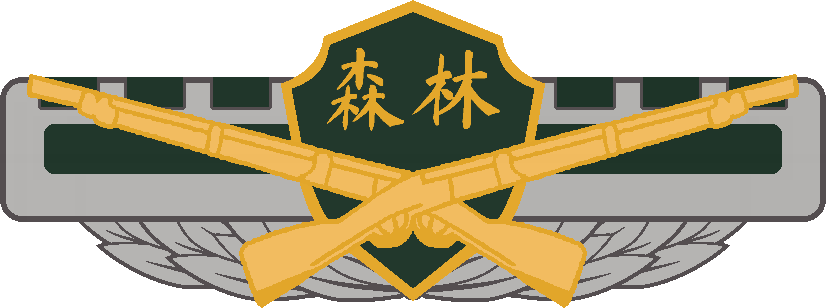
Badge of the PAP Forestry Corps

The People's Armed Police Forestry Corps (Chinese: 武警森林部队) was a former branch of the PAP which did tasks such as fighting Wildfires and law enforcement in forest areas, along with protecting wildlife, disaster relief. When it was active, it was the only military branch on Earth whose task was fighting wildfires. It was nicknamed the "Fearless Red Boys". The Forestry Corps was officially disbanded on 10 October 2018.

==== History ====
Roundel of the People's Armed Police Forestry Corps Helicopter Detachment

The Forestry Corps can trace its lineage to the Armed Forest Protection Battalions (Chinese: 武装护林大队); There were a total of four battalions; Each of the Hejiang, Songjiang, Longjiang and Jilin provinces consisted of one Armed Forest Protection Battalion. Founded on 25 August 1948, these units were created to conduct counterinsurgency operations against Japanese/Collaborator holdouts (This role was also later expanded to KMT holdouts after the Chinese Civil War), bandits and triads in Northeast China, which would often raid local villages and commit acts of arson, causing wildfires. At the time of establishment, each had 960 soldiers (3840 soldiers, all battalions combined). The Armed Forest Protection Battalions would often disguise themselves as hunters during recon, and used Cavalry tactics. By 16 October 1950, each battalion had 1600 soldiers (6400 Soldiers total). According to archives, by 1952, the Armed Forest Protection Battalions had killed a total of 6 KMT and American spies along with capturing a total of 46 spies, 34 triad members and 71 illegal migrants along with 68 firearms, multiple tens of thousand rounds of ammunition, multiple kilograms of drugs and prevented a total of 7 vandalism incidents.

On 11 May 1953, the Armed Forest Protection Battalions were transferred to the People's Economic Police and renamed to the Forest Protection Police (Chinese: 护林警察队). Its task was to patrol forests, prevent illegal entry of protected areas and to serve as lookouts for forest fires. It often continued to have shootouts with KMT/American spies along with bandits and assisted with protecting lumberjacks and logging facilities. The Forest Protection Police continued to use Cavalry, and were seen in photos with Mosin Nagant rifles. In the first few months of its founding, the Forest Protection Police lost many officers due to disorientation, and in October 1953, the Forest Protection Police began mapping forest regions of China and issuing crude maps to its officers. Due to the logistics issues of boots-on-the-ground firefighting, in 1960 the Forest Police received 122 paratroopers and founded the Forest Police Smokejumper Company (Chinese: 森警空降扑火中队) for rapid deployment against wildfires. The Lisunov Li-2 was used by the Smokejumper Company. On 27 May 1965 the Company saw its first action, deploying 10 Smokejumpers to assist with fighting a wildfire in Daxing'anling Prefecture. In 1978, the Smokejumper Company was renamed to the Airborne Detachment (Chinese: 森警机降支队). Between its establishment and 1981, the Airborne Detachment was deployed to fight a total of over 325 wildfires, however its fate past 1981 is currently unknown.

On 18 April 1978, the Forest Police became a volunteer force with three years of service. On 3 May 1984, the Forest Police became part of the People's Armed Police and was under the dual command of the People's Armed Police and the National Forestry Administration. On 13 January 1988, the People's Armed Police Forestry Corps was officially established. On 10 February 1999, the Forestry Corps HQ, Inner Mongolia Corps, Heilongjiang Corps, Jilin Corps and Yunnan Detachment (later upgraded to corps level) were founded, in 2002 the Sichuan Corps, Tibet Corps and Xinjiang Corps were founded, and in 2007 the Fujian Corps, the Gansu Corps and Mobile Detachment were founded. On 22 July 2009, the People's Armed Police Headquarters Helicopter Detachment was founded. It was stationed in Daqing and operated Z-8 Helicopters, which were used for search and rescue, personnel transport and firefighting. The Helicopter Detachment had the nickname "Heroic Firefighting Hawks". AC313s were also ordered.

After the 2008 Sichuan Earthquake, the Forestry Corps deployed over 2000 personnel to assist with rescue efforts. In total, the forestry corps evacuated 14,000 people, rescued 8 survivors, recovered the bodies of 1,200 victim along with transporting 2,000 tonnes of aid, repairing 40 km of roads and rescuing 86 giant pandas.

On 16 September 2015, the Forestry Corps Lijiang Detachment was deployed to Huaping county to conduct post-flood disaster relief efforts, rescuing 10 people and transporting 60 tonnes of aid.

On 22 March 2018, it was announced that the Forestry Corps was merged into the National Fire and Rescue Administration, becoming a purely civilian firefighting agency and losing its law enforcement duties. The 13 Provincial Forestry Corps were converted into Forest Fire Departments; the Mobile Detachment was renamed to the National Fire and Rescue Administration Mobile Detachment. The Helicopter Detachment was renamed to the National Fire and Rescue Administration Daqing Aerial Rescue Detachment, and the 2nd Group, Helicopter Detachment was renamed to the National Fire and Rescue Administration Kunming Aerial Rescue Detachment. The merge was officially finalised on 15:00, 29 September 2018.

On 2 June 2018, large scale wildfires sprung up in Daxing'anling Prefecture. A total of 7000 Forestry Corps personnel were deployed from the Inner Mongolia, Heilongjiang and Jilin Corps to suppress the wildfire.

Between 1948 and 2018, the Forestry Corps and its predecessors conducted a total of 16,000 wildfire fighting operations and 43,000 law enforcement operations. A total of 236 units and personnel received honorary titles, and 92 units and personnel received 1st Class Meritorious Service Medals.

=== Gold Corps ===
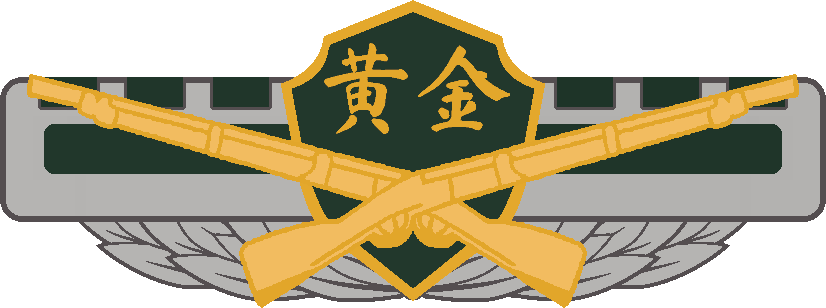
Badge of the PAP Gold Corps

Prior to the 2018 reforms, the People's Armed Police Gold Corps (Chinese: 武警黄金部队) was a branch of the PAP whose role switched multiple times in history, however it was mostly dedicated to finding gold deposits, mining gold and providing law enforcement at gold mines.

==== History ====
It was founded in March 1979 as part of the People's Liberation Army Basic Engineering Corps. It was under the joint dual command of the Basic Engineering Corps and the Ministry of Metallurgical Industry.

It consisted of 7 regiment level battalions and 12 geological teams.

The Gold Corps was handed to the PAP in January 1985. After 1985, it went under the dual control of the Ministry of Metallurgical Industry and Ministry of Public Security. Its role in this time was to do geological surveys for gold mining.

After February 1999, it went under the dual control of the People's Armed Police and the State Economic and Trade Commission. Its official duties were: finding gold deposits, providing security and law enforcement to gold mines, mining gold and preventing conflict near gold mines.

By 2011, the gold corps had mined 1800 tonnes of gold. The same year in December, its official role switched again to geological surveying and metal analysis along with disaster relief to geological related incidents and law enforcement.

In 2016, its role was switched yet again to focus primarily on military geology related work in the Deepening National Defense and Military Reform.

In 2018, the Gold Corps was disbanded and its personnel were handed to the Ministry of Natural Resources, the China Geological Survey and the China National Gold Group Corporation.

==== Organisation ====
- 1st Gold Corps - Headquarters in Harbin
  - 1st Gold Detachment
  - 2nd Gold Detachment
  - 3rd Gold Detachment
  - 4th Gold Detachment
- 2nd Gold Corps
  - 5th Gold Detachment
  - 6th Gold Detachment
  - 7th Gold Detachment
  - 8th Gold Detachment
- 3rd Gold Corps - Headquarters in Chengdu
  - 9th Gold Detachment
  - 10th Gold Detachment
  - 11th Gold Detachment
  - 12th Gold Detachment
- Gold Corps Research Institute
- Gold Corps Training Battalion

==== 2020 Reforms ====
In September 2020, some former Gold Corps units were reactivated and transferred to the China Geological Survey under different names.

- The 1st Gold Corps was renamed to the China Geological Survey Harbin Natural Resources Comprehensive Research Center.
- The 1st Gold Detachment was renamed to the China Geological Survey Mudanjiang Natural Resources Comprehensive Research Center.
- The 2nd Gold Detachment was renamed to the China Geological Survey Hohhot Natural Resources Comprehensive Research Center
- The 5th Gold Detachment was renamed to the China Geological Survey Xi'an Mineral Resources Research Center.
- The 6th Gold Detachment was renamed to the China Geological Survey Xining Natural Resources Comprehensive Research Center.
- The 8th Gold Detachment was renamed to the China Geological Survey Ürümqi Natural Resources Comprehensive Research Center.
- The 9th Gold Detachment was renamed to the China Geological Survey Haikou Marine Geology Research Center
- The 10th Gold Detachment was renamed to the China Geological Survey Kunming Natural Resources Comprehensive Research Center.
- The 11th Gold Detachment was renamed to the China Geological Survey Changsha Natural Resources Comprehensive Research Center.
- The Research Institute and Training Battalion were renamed to the China Geological Survey Geophysics Research Center in Langfang.

=== Hydropower Corps ===
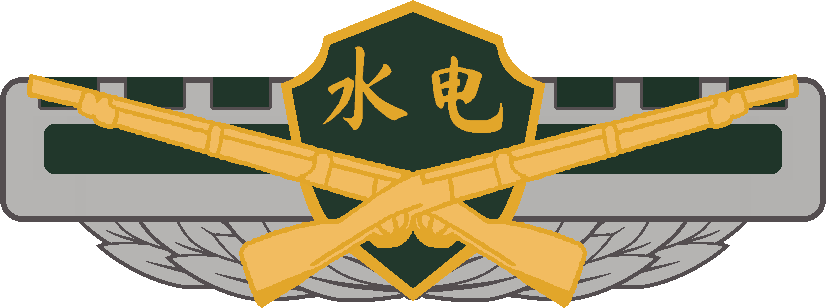
Badge of the PAP Hydropower Corps

Prior to the 2018 reforms, the People's Armed Police Hydropower Corps (Chinese: 武警水电部队) was a specialist corps of the People's Armed Police. After the 2018 reforms, it was reorganised into the China Anneng Construction Group (中国安能建设集团), a state owned corporation for construction and disaster relief.

Prior to 2018, the Hydropower Corps was in charge of managing, constructing and providing law enforcement to hyrdropower facilities along with flood management.

==== History ====
In Summer 1950, due to the Huai River flooding, Mao Zedong and Zhou Enlai laid plans to deploy military forces for flood disaster relief. On 8 February 1952, the East China Field Army's 90th Division was recalled from Northeast China (where it was originally meant to participate in the Korean war) and reorganised into the 1st and 2nd hydraulic engineering divisions, and deployed to conduct flood management. In Spring of 1955, the 1st and 2nd hydraulic engineering divisions were disbanded, with its personnel becoming civilian engineers.

Due to local civilian engineers having lower efficiency, on 30 March 1966, this was reported to Mao who established the People's Liberation Army Basic Engineering Corps 4th Column re-organisation office to prepare for re-mobilising troops for the purpose of flood management. On 1 August 1966, in Yingxiuwan Damn (映秀湾水电站), Wenchuan County the People's Liberation Army Basic Engineering Corps 61st Detachment was established.

On 22 August 1978, the People's Liberation Army Basic Engineering Corps 63rd Detachment was established to construct the Wan'an Dam in Wan'an County. The 63rd Detachment contained 6 battalions, with its first commander being Chen Shuguang, a Chinese Civil War veteran.

On 19 August 1982, the Basic Engineering Corps was disbanded; Personnel of the Hydropower units of the Basic engineering corps became PAP personnel on 1 January 1985, and in February 1999 the Hydropower corps went under the command of the People's Armed Police.

On 1 July 2009, the Hydropower Corps officially became part of China's emergency management system as a disaster relief agency.

The 3rd Hyrdopower Detachment's Search and Rescue Company was established in August 2013 and was the elite unit of the Hydropower Corps dedicated to Urban Search and Rescue.

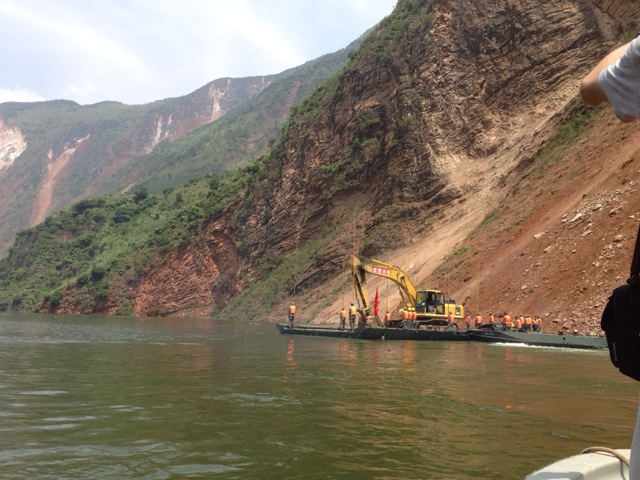
The Hydropower corps providing aid after the 2014 Ludian Earthquake

Throughout its history, the Hydropower corps has been involved in the construction of over 50 hydropower projects, including the Three Gorges Dam, Wan'an Dam and Longtan Dam, along with providing aid and rescue to many disasters, such as the 2014 Ludian earthquake and 2015 Shenzhen landslide.

The Hydropower corps was deployed for search and rescue after the 2013 Qingdao oil pipeline explosion.

After the 2014 Ludian earthquake, the 1st Hydropower Corps deployed 263 personnel to conduct an emergency demolition operation of Changhai Dam, which after the earthquake had huge risk of a dam failure.

The Hydropower corps was officially disbanded on 30 August 2018, and was handed over to the China Anneng Construction Group in April 2019.

==== Organisation (1982–2018) ====
- 1st Hydropower Corps - Formerly the Basic Engineering Corps 61st Detachment; Headquarters in Nanning
  - 1st Hydropower Detachment
  - 2nd Hydropower Detachment
  - 3rd Hydropower Detachment
    - Search and rescue company
  - 4th Hydropower Detachment
  - 5th Hydropower Detachment
- 2nd Hydropower Corps - Formerly the Basic Engineering Corps 63rd Detachment
  - 7th Hydropower Detachment
  - 8th Hydropower Detachment
  - 9th Hydropower Detachment
- 3rd Hydropower Corps
  - 10th Hydropower Detachment
  - 12th Hydropower Detachment

==== Post reform organisations ====
- The 1st Hydropower Corps was converted into the China Anneng Construction Group's 1st Engineering Bureau (Headquartered in Nanning) on 19 November 2019.
- The 2nd Hydropower Corps was converted into the China Anneng Construction Group's 2nd Engineering Bureau (Headquartered in Nanchang) on 14 November 2019.
- The 3rd Hydropower Corps was converted into the China Anneng Construction Group's 3rd Engineering Bureau (Headquartered in Chengdu) on 12 November 2019. It has branches in Wuhan and Chongqing.

== See also ==
- Ranks of the People's Armed Police
- Gendarmerie
- Republic of China (Taiwan) Military Police
- Central Armed Police Forces
