= Long Tan =

Long Tan and similar may refer to:

- Long Tan (footballer), (Chinese order: Tan Long, 谭龙) a Chinese footballer (born 1988)
- Longtan Dam, a large dam on the Hongshui River in the Guangxi Zhuang Autonomous Region, China
- The Battle of Long Tan, fought by the Royal Australian Regiment in South Vietnam in August 1966

== See also ==
- Longtan (disambiguation)
- Long Tân (disambiguation), various places in Vietnam
