= China Geological Survey =

Chinese government agency

Symbol of China Geological Survey

The China Geological Survey (CGS) (Chinese: 中国地质调查局) is a government-owned, Chinese organization researching China's mineral resources under the State Council of the People's Republic of China. According to the national land and resources survey plan, it is now managed by the Ministry of Natural Resources. It is the largest Geoscience agency in China since being reinstated in 1999, and the headquarter is in Beijing, the capital of China.

The CGS is the primary organization responsible for conducting geological surveys and research in China, and its work is focused on resource exploration, environmental protection, geological hazard prevention, and geological disaster reduction.

The CGS conducts geological surveys across China's land, sea, and polar regions, with a particular focus on the exploration and development of mineral resources. It also conducts research on geology, mineral resources, and geological hazards. The CGS is responsible for publishing geological maps, reports, and other scientific publications related to its work. In addition, the CGS maintains a number of research institutions, laboratories, and observatories that focus on various aspects of geology and geophysics. The annual budget of China Geological Survey is approximately 540 million US dollars in 2021, and there are approximately 14,000 employees in 2022. In particular, China Geological Survey also aims to provide scientific support for the sustainable development of China's economy, society and environment, and to promote the protection and utilization of geological resources.

== History ==
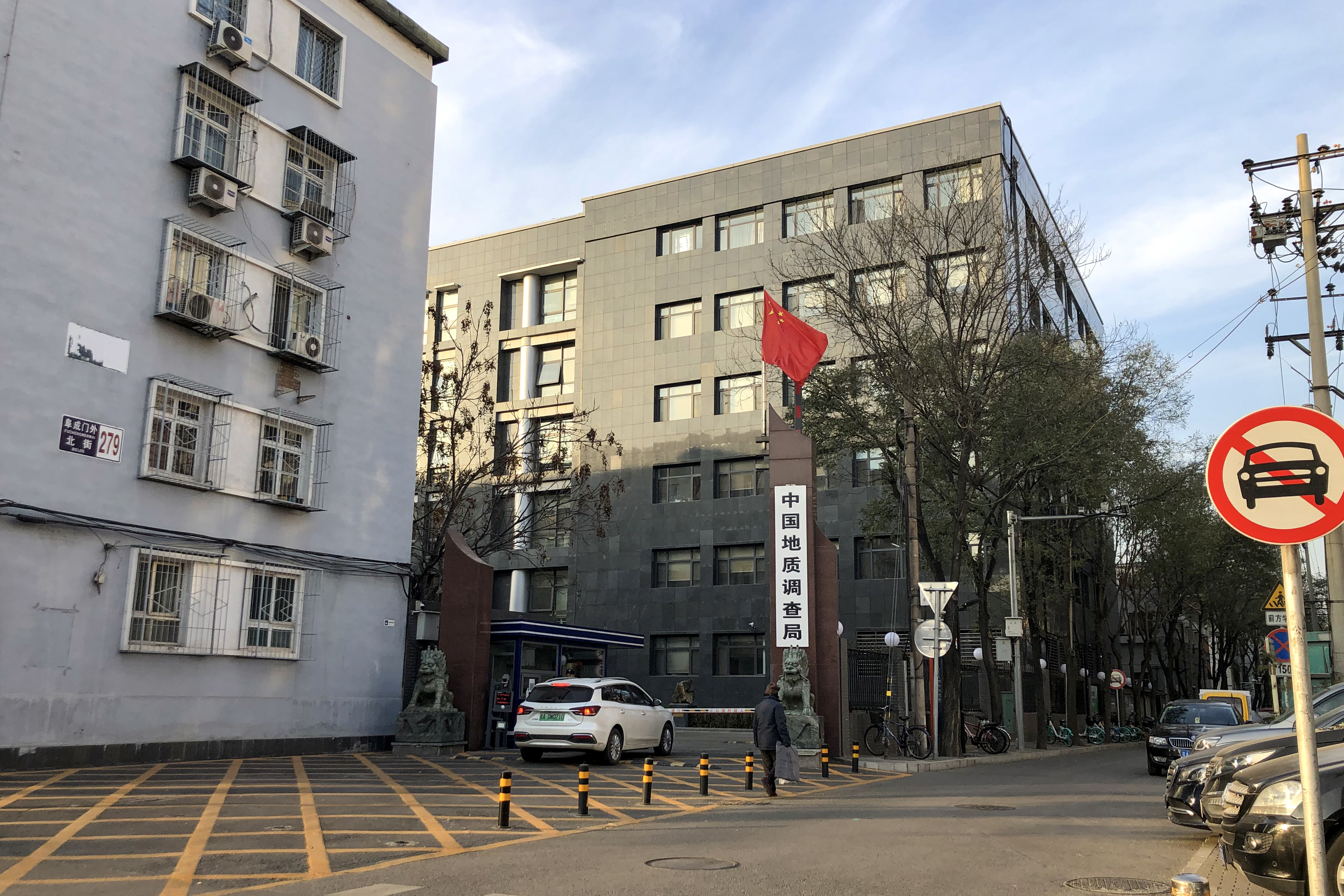
CGS headquarters

The China Geological Survey originated in the early days of the Republic of China (when it had control over mainland China). Many prominent geologists and paleontologists worked with the Survey in the early days, such as Davidson Black or Teilhard de Chardin. It was disbanded after the People's Republic of China gained control over mainland China and reinstated in 1999.

=== Republic of China period ===
The China Geological Survey originated in the period of the Republic of China. In 1912, the Nanjing Provisional Government of the Republic of China officially established the Geological Section in the Mining Department of the Ministry of Industry. In June 1913, the Government of the Republic of China established the "Geological Survey Institute of the Ministry of Industry and Commerce". In February 1916, the Ministry of Agriculture and Commerce of the Beiyang Government established a Geological Survey Bureau directly under it. In July 1916, the first batch of 18 geological graduates independently trained by China officially entered the Geological Survey Bureau of the Ministry of Agriculture and Commerce. In October 1916, the Geological Survey Bureau was renamed the Geological Survey Institute and implemented independent accounting. Many famous geologists and paleontologists of the time, such as Davidson Black, carried out the survey work in the early stage. And Zhang Hongzhao, Ding Wenjiang, Weng Wenhao, Li Siguang and other 299 geologists.

During the Anti-Japanese War, the Geological Survey Institute first moved from Beiping to Nanjing, and then from Nanjing to Chongqing via Changsha. During this period, Yanchang Oilfield and Yumen Oilfield were successively discovered or surveyed, a batch of tungsten mines were discovered in Jiangxi, bauxite mines were discovered in Yunnan and Guizhou, and coal mines were discovered in Zhaotong, Yunnan and Shuicheng, Guizhou.

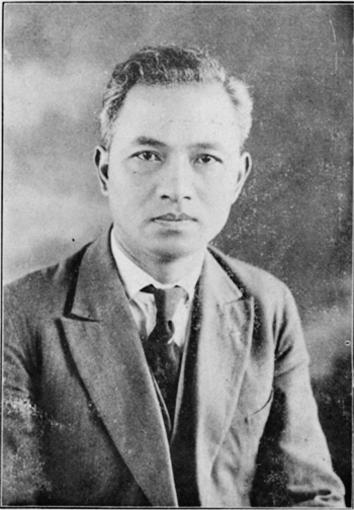
Geologist Li Siguang

=== Early Period of People's Republic of China ===
After the founding of People's Republic of China in 1949, before and after the start of the "First Five-Year Plan", the country's economic construction urgently needed mineral support. Li Siguang led the planning and established the China Geological Work Planning Steering Committee in August 1950. In 1952, the Ministry of Geology was established to lead and manage the general survey and exploration of mineral resources in the country, and to uniformly arrange and organize the implementation of national geological work. Li Siguang was appointed as the Minister of Geology. In 1952, domestic colleges and universities adjusted the setting of geology majors and established professional geology colleges with complete disciplines. By 1966, in addition to the affiliated Beijing Institute of Geology, Chengdu Institute of Geology, and Changchun Institute of Geology, more than 20 colleges and universities across the country had departments of geology, coalfield geology, and marine geology. In the more than ten years from 1953 to 1966, the geological department trained 75,000 geological graduates at all levels, more than 100 times the number of geological professionals trained before 1949. In addition to the geological talents trained by other departments, The total number exceeds 110,000. Among them, graduate students accounted for 0.75% of the total, and undergraduate students accounted for 38.8%. In 1970, the State Council reformed and the Ministry of Geology was reorganized into the Geological Bureau of the State Planning Commission.

=== After the Reform and Opening Up ===
After the reform and opening up, the Ministry of Geology was restored. In 1982, the Ministry of Geology was renamed the Ministry of Geology and Mineral Resources. From 1977 to 1996, a total of 300,000 geological graduates were trained. The Ministry of Land and Resources was established in 1998. In 1999, the reform of the geological survey system was implemented, and the China Geological Survey Bureau was established. As of October 2016, there were 7,549 active employees. Among them, there are 1,423 people with a doctoral degree and 2,392 people with a master's degree, accounting for 19% and 32% of the total number respectively; 1,185 people have senior professional titles, and 1,464 people with associate senior professional titles, accounting for 16% and 19% of the total number respectively. There are 16 academicians of the Chinese Academy of Sciences and the Chinese Academy of Engineering, 9 of them won the title of "Li Siguang Scholar", 33 of outstanding geological talents, and 58 of outstanding geological talents.

== Institutional Settings and Affiliates of China Geological Survey ==
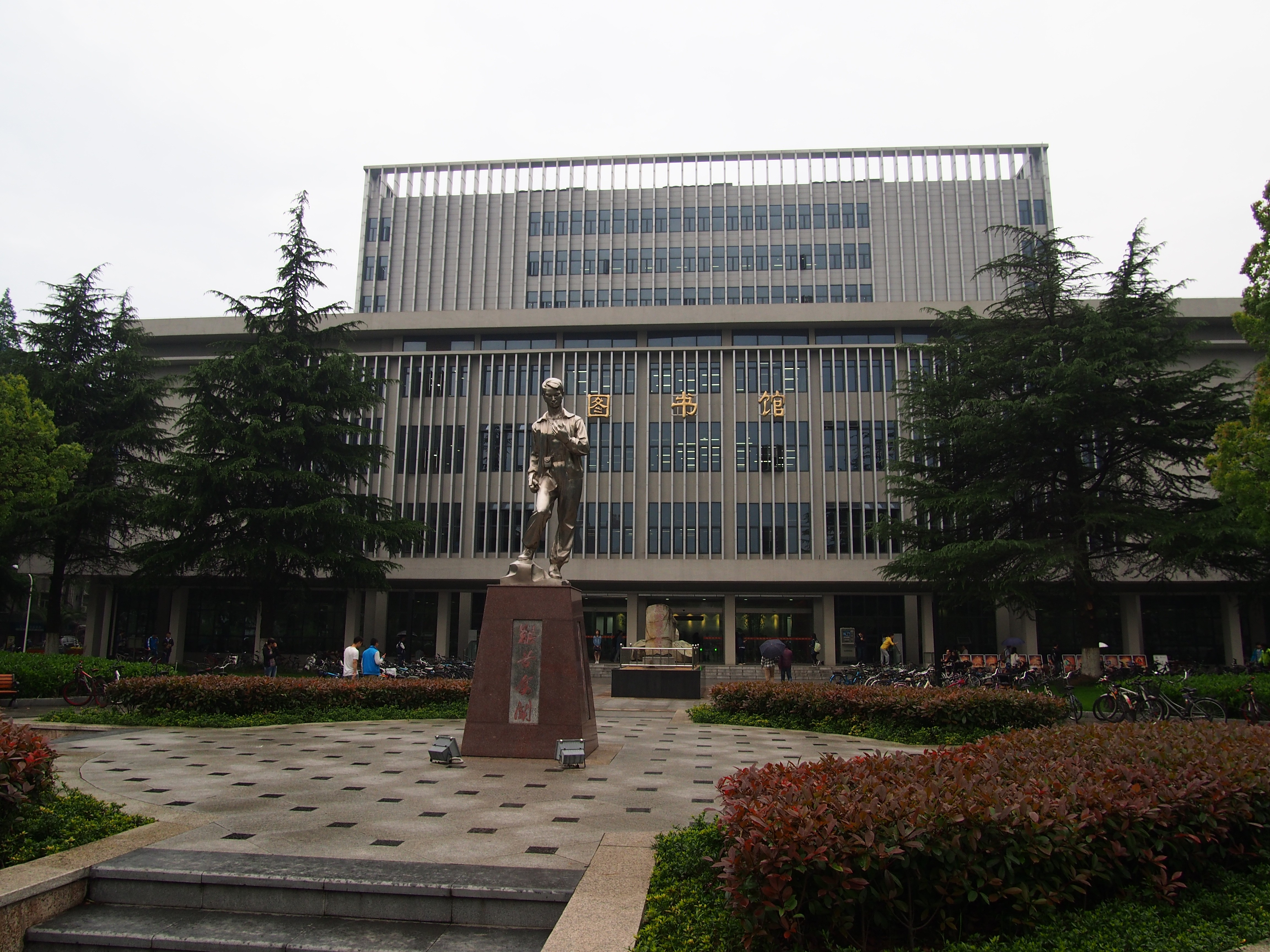
National Geological Library of China

The institutional setup of the China Geological Survey includes several departments:

1. The Planning and Finance Department is responsible for formulating CGS' annual plans, budget and financial management. The Geological Survey conducts geological surveys and surveys, and analyzes and interprets the data collected. The Department of Mineral Resources is responsible for assessing China's mineral resources and promoting the sustainable development of resources.
2. China Geological Survey consists of key disciplines such as the Department of Geology, the Department of Mineral Resources, the Department of Marine Geology, and the Department of Environmental Geology. These departments are responsible for conducting research in their respective fields and providing expert advice to government agencies and private companies.

In addition, China Geological Survey has several research centers, including the Institute of Geology, the Institute of Mineral Resources, and the Institute of Marine Geology. These centers are responsible for advanced research and development in their respective fields.

There are also some affiliates of China Geological Survey:

=== National Geological Library of China (NGLC) ===
National Geological Library of China (CNGL) is a national library specializing in geological and mineral resources information, which is also called the GeoScience Documentation Center of China Geological Survey (CGS). It is a public welfare unit that affiliated to the China Geological Survey. It is managed by the China Geological Survey, it contains a wide range of geological data and information resources. There are some main tasks for NGLC, like collecting, processing and developing the geoscience literature. Meanwhile, NGLC can also "carry out related research and information system construction, and provide geoscience literature and information". At present, NGLC has "710,000 books and documents published at home and abroad", have "more than 10,000 documents", and "more than 20 databases, covering a history of nearly 200 years". The Earth Science Documentation Center of the China Geological Survey is an executive director unit of the Library Society of China.

The primary duties and functions include:

1. To collect, organize, and preserve the literature that relative to geoscience which are published in China and all over the world;
2. To "process and disseminate", and "research, develop and transform" the domestic and foreign geoscience literature information in order to provide an information query platform about geology for the people so that the geoscience knowledge can be disseminated to people.
3. To develop standards for library science, information processing technology, and related research;
4. To establish partnerships with relevant industries and institutions in China and abroad to carry out business exchanges and cooperation.
5. To fulfill the functions of the Earth Science Documentation Center; to build a geoscience literature resource system, and to provide "professional guidance and related technical training" on geoscience documentation for the China Geological Survey

=== China Geological Survey Data Sharing Service Platform ===
The China Geological Survey Data Sharing Service Platform is a website operated by the China Geological Survey that provides a wide range of geological data and information resources, including geological maps, reports, and other scientific publications. The platform aims to facilitate data sharing and collaboration among researchers, government agencies and other stakeholders in the fields of geology and mineral resources. The platform contains a wealth of geological data and information, including geology, mineral resources, hydrology, geophysics and environmental geology data.

Data is organized into various categories that can be searched and downloaded through the platform's search interface. In addition to the website, the CGS data sharing service platform also provides mobile applications for users to access data and information anytime and anywhere. The app is available for download on Android and iOS devices. The platform also offers a variety of data analysis and visualization tools and services, as well as scientific publications and other resources related to geology and mineral resources.

=== Chinese Academy of Geological Sciences (CAGS) ===
The Chinese Academy of Geological Sciences (CAGS) is a scientific research institution that operates under the China Geological Survey (CGS). It was established in 1956 and is headquartered in Beijing, China. The CAGS is the leading research institution in the field of geology and mineral resources in China and plays a significant role in conducting geological research, promoting scientific and technological progress, and advancing sustainable development in the field of geology.

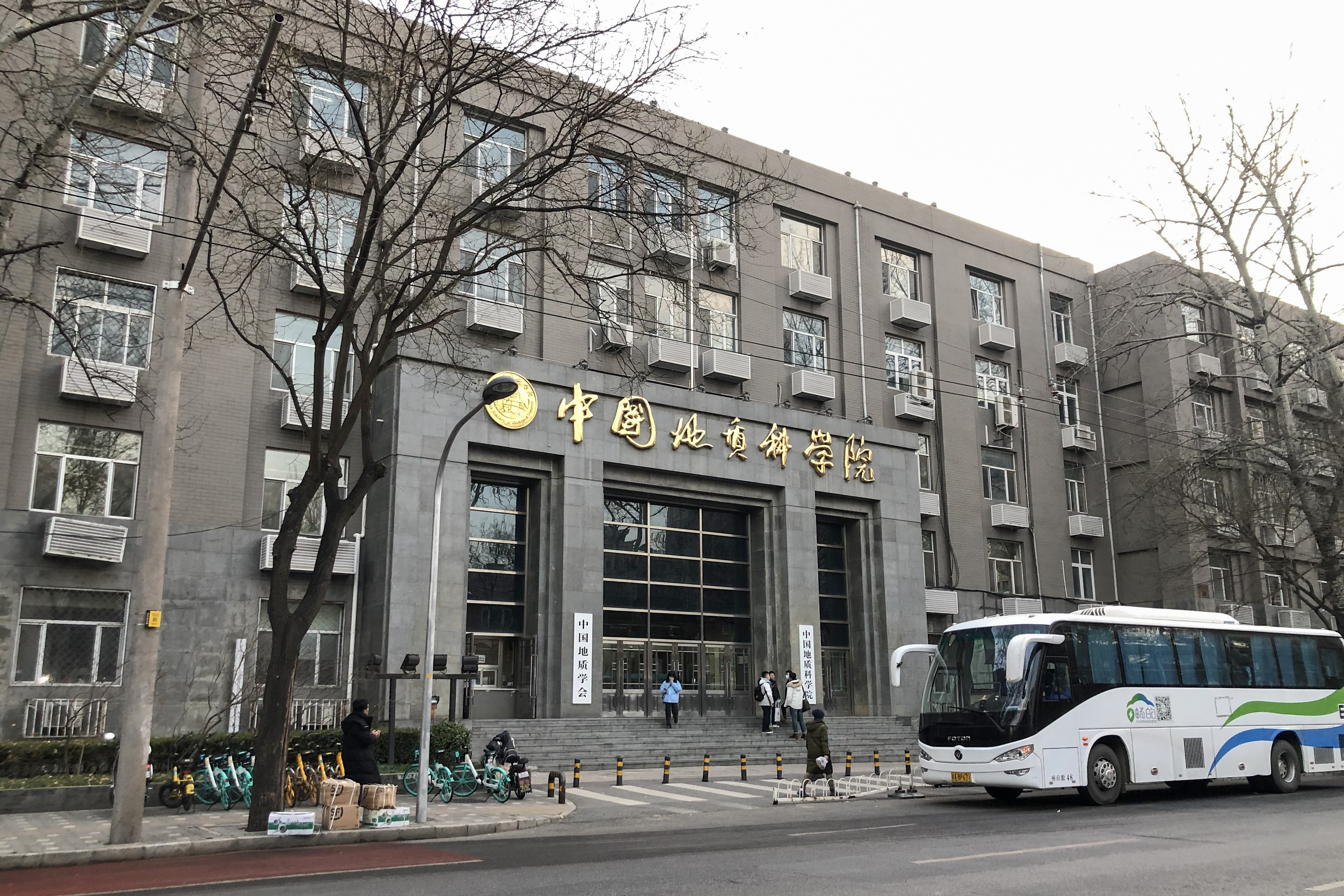
Chinese Academy of Geological Sciences (North Gate)

The CAGS conducts a wide range of research activities, including basic research, applied research, and technological development in the fields of geology, mineral resources, and environmental geology. It also provides training and education programs for geologists, conducts international scientific cooperation, and publishes a variety of scientific publications and journals.

The CAGS is organized into several research departments, including the Institute of Mineral Resources, the Institute of Geology, the Institute of Hydrogeology and Environmental Geology, and the Institute of Remote Sensing and Digital Earth. These research departments are focused on specific areas of geology and mineral resources research, and they work closely with each other to conduct interdisciplinary research.

=== China Mining ===
China Mining is a website that provides news and information about China's mining industry, including geological surveying and exploration. It is a website that covers a wide range of topics related to the mining industry, such as mining policies, investment opportunities, and technological developments. The website is operated by China Mining Association (CMA), which is a non-profit, non-governmental organization that represents the mining industry in China. The CMA was established in 1987 and is based in Beijing, China. It has more than 1,500 members, including mining companies, research institutions, and other stakeholders in the mining industry.

China Mining provides news and analysis on the latest developments in Mining Industry of China, as well as insights into the country's mining policies and regulations. It also features articles and reports on technological innovations and best practices in the mining sector. The website provides a platform for networking and knowledge sharing among stakeholders in the mining industry, including mining companies, investors, and policymakers.

China Mining also organizes the annual conference and exhibition, which is one of the largest mining events in the world. The conference provides a platform for mining companies, investors, and other stakeholders to exchange ideas and to share information on the latest developments in the mining industry.

== Major Achievements and News for China Geological Survey in the Past 20 Years ==
In the past two decades, the China Geological Survey has made significant progress in geological research and exploration. Some key achievements include:

1. Deep-sea Exploration: The China Geological Survey has carried out deep-sea geological surveys and achieved important results. In 2017, they completed their survey of the western Pacific Ocean floor, discovering new types of minerals, hydrothermal vents and cold seeps.
2. Resource Exploration: China Geological Survey has made significant progress in the exploration and development of rare earth metals, oil and gas, coal and other mineral resources. For example, the agency discovered new deposits of rare earth metals in southern China and helped develop new extraction techniques for these valuable resources.
3. Mineral Exploration: The China Geological Survey has made remarkable achievements in the fields of mineral exploration such as the discovery of new mineral resources and the evaluation of mineral resources. In 2008, they discovered a large copper deposit in Tibet, and in 2018, they discovered a large gold deposit in Shandong.
4. Prevention and Control of Geological Disasters: The China Geological Survey has also made important contributions to the prevention and control of geological disasters such as earthquakes, landslides, and tiankengs. The agency develops advanced monitoring and early warning systems to help reduce the impact of these disasters on people and property. After the Wenchuan earthquake in 2008, they played an important role in earthquake relief. A geological disaster early warning system has been developed and a geological disaster monitoring network has been established.
5. Environmental Protection: The China Geological Survey has been actively involved in environmental protection, especially in relation to geological hazards and disasters. The institution conducts research on the impact of human activities on the environment and provides technical support for environmental impact assessment and restoration projects.
6. International cooperation: The China Geological Survey has played an important role in promoting international cooperation and exchanges in the geological field. The agency is involved in a number of international geological surveys and research projects, and cooperates with other countries in resource exploration and environmental protection. Carry out joint geological surveys with Pakistan, Mongolia, Russia and other countries, and participate in international geoscience projects.
7. Technological Innovation: China Geological Survey has made significant progress in geological surveying and mapping technology, and developed a three-dimensional geological mapping system and a comprehensive geological environment monitoring system. These innovations help improve the accuracy and efficiency of geological surveys and resource exploration.
8. Public Education: The China Geological Survey has been actively involved in public education and publicity related to geological and environmental protection. The institution develops educational materials and programs for students and the general public, and works to raise awareness of the importance of geology and environmental conservation.

More Detailed Achievements of China Geological Survey

1. In 2003, the China Geological Survey discovered new reserves of rare earth metals in southern China, one of the largest in the world.
2. In 2012, the China Geological Survey launched a nationwide project to map the distribution of shale gas resources in China, which led to the discovery of new reserves of this important energy resource.
3. In 2014, the China Geological Survey discovered a new major gold deposit in China's Xinjiang Uyghur Autonomous Region that has the potential to be one of the largest gold deposits in the world.
4. In 2021, the Chinese Academy of Geological Sciences will participate in the Mars probe launch mission of the National Space Administration, including geological surveys and Mars surface exploration.

== Nine Programs in Future ==
The Nine Programs for future of China Geological Survey is a series of strategic initiatives aimed at improving China's geological survey capabilities and promoting sustainable resource development. These programs include:

1. Basic Geological Survey Program: This program involves conducting systematic and comprehensive geological surveys in China to establish a basic understanding of its geology.
2. Mineral Resource Exploration Program: This program aims to increase the exploration and evaluation of China's mineral resources and promote the sustainable development of resources.
3. Geohazard Assessment Program: This program aims to improve China's ability to predict and mitigate geological hazards such as earthquakes, landslides, and floods.
4. Earth Environment Survey Program: This program aims to assess the impact of human activities on the environment and develop strategies for environmental protection.
5. Geological Data Management Program: This program aims to establish a comprehensive geological data management system to support decision-making and scientific research.
6. Geological Mapping Program: This program aims to produce high-quality geological maps of China to support resource exploration, environmental management, and disaster prevention.
7. Geoscience Research Program: This program promotes scientific research in geology and related fields such as mineralogy, petrology, and geochemistry.
8. International Cooperation Program: This program aims to establish partnerships with international organizations to promote cooperation in the field of geology.
9. Geological Surveyor Training Program: This program aims to improve the quality of geological surveyors through training and professional development.

== See also ==
- Cenozoic Research Laboratory
- Geology of China
- Geological Museum of China
- History of Chinese archaeology
- China University of Geosciences
- List of geoscience organizations
- Land and resources competent authority: Ministry of Natural Resources of the People's Republic of China
- Professional fields Universities directly under the Ministry of Education: China University of Geosciences
- Meteorological forecasting departments: China Meteorological Administration
- Earthquake monitoring department: China Earthquake Administration
- Surveying and Mapping Department: National Bureau of Surveying
