= Longtan =

Longtan may refer to several places:

== China ==
- Longtan Dam (龙滩大坝), dam in Guangxi
- Longtan District, Jilin City (龙潭区), Jilin
- Longtan Park (龙潭公园), Beijing

Subdistricts (龙潭街道)

- Longtan, Guiyang, a subdistrict of Guiyang County, Hunan
- Longtan Subdistrict, Beijing, in Dongcheng District
- Longtan Subdistrict, Nanjing, in Qixia District
- Longtan Subdistrict, Jilin City, in Longtan District, Jilin City
- Longtan Subdistrict, Chengdu, in Chenghua District

Towns (龙潭镇)

- Longtan, Youyang County, in Youyang Tujia and Miao Autonomous County, Chongqing
- Longtan, Fujian, in Yongding County
- Longtan, Henan, in Tanghe County
- Longtan, Xupu, in Xupu County, Hunan
- Longtan, Jiangxi, in Gao'an
- Longtan, Xiuyan County, in Xiuyan Manchu Autonomous County, Liaoning
- Longtan, Zigong, in Gongjing District, Zigong, Sichuan

Townships (龙潭乡)

- Longtan Township, Anhui, in Qianshan County, Anhui
- Longtan Township, Chongqing, in Shizhu Tujia Autonomous County
- Longtan, Zhuzhou
- Longtan Township, Hunan, in Zhuzhou County
- Longtan Township, Liaoning, in Beipiao
- Longtan Township, Guangyuan, in Lizhou District, Guangyuan, Sichuan
- Longtan Township, Qu County, in Qu County, Sichuan
- Longtan Township, Mojiang County, in Mojiang Hani Autonomous County, Yunnan
- Longtan Township, Yangbi County, in Yangbi Yi Autonomous County, Yunnan
- Longtan Township, Yuanjiang County, in Yuanjiang Hani, Yi and Dai Autonomous County, Yunnan
- Longtan Li and Dai Ethnic Township (龙潭彝族傣族乡), Simao District, Pu'er, Yunnan

== Taiwan ==
- Longtan District, Taoyuan (龍潭區)
- Longtan Lake, a lake in Longtan District

== Vietnam ==
- See Long Tân (disambiguation)

== Other uses ==
- Long Tan (footballer) (born 1988), Chinese footballer
- Longtan Dam, a gravity dam on the Hongshui River in Tian'e County of the Guangxi Zhuang Autonomous Region, China

== See also ==
- Longton (disambiguation)
