= CASM =

CASM may refer to:

== Education ==
- Centre for Aboriginal Studies in Music, an educational unit of the University of Adelaide, South Australia
- Certificate of Advanced Study in Mathematics, a former qualification gained from Cambridge University

== Galleries and museums ==
- Canada Aviation and Space Museum, the national aviation history museum in Ottawa, Ontario, Canada
- Canadian Air and Space Conservancy, formerly Canadian Air and Space Museum, a former aviation museum in Toronto, Ontario, Canada
- Centre d'Art Santa Mònica, an art gallery in Barcelona, Spain

== Other uses ==
- Centre for the Analysis of Social Media, a research unit of the UK think tank Demos
- Chinese Academy of Surveying and Mapping, a research organization in China
- Collaborative group on Artisanal and Small-Scale Mining, an association for artisanal mining
- Cost per Available Seat Mile, a measure of unit cost in the airline industry
