= Longton =

Longton may refer to several places:

- Longton, Kansas, United States
- Longton, Lancashire, United Kingdom
- Longton, Staffordshire, United Kingdom

== See also ==
- Longtan (disambiguation)
- Longtown (disambiguation)
- long ton - a unit of weight
