= Chinese Academy of Surveying and Mapping =

Chinese research institute

The Chinese Academy of Surveying and Mapping (CASM, Chinese: 中国测绘科学研究院) is a research institute affiliated with the China's Ministry of Natural Resources dedicated to studies on surveying and geographic information science since 1959.

== See also ==
- State Bureau of Surveying and Mapping
