= Longtown =

Longtown may refer to several places:

in the United Kingdom:

- Longtown, Cumbria, an English town near the Scottish border
- Longtown, Herefordshire, an English linear village and parish
- Longtown, County Antrim, a townland in County Antrim, Northern Ireland

in the United States:

- Longtown, Missouri, a village in Perry County, Missouri
- Longtown, Mississippi, an unincorporated community in Panola County, Mississippi
- Longtown, Ohio, an unincorporated community in Darke County, Ohio
- Longtown, Oklahoma, a census-designated community in Pittsburg County, Oklahoma
- Longtown, South Carolina, an unincorporated community in Fairfield County, South Carolina

== See also ==
- Longton (disambiguation)
