= Chinese Academy of Geological Sciences =

Chinese research institute

- 中国地质科学院

Agency overview
- Formed: 1956; 70 years ago
- Headquarters: Beijing
- Parent agency: Ministry of Land and Resources
- Website: en.cags.ac.cn

The Chinese Academy of Geological Sciences (CAGS; Chinese: 中国地质科学院) is an institution that engages in geoscience research in the People's Republic of China. The academy was established in 1956 and reorganized in 1999. Administratively it is under the PRC Ministry of Land and Resources.

== Research ==
The academy conducts scientific research on various aspects of geology and geophysics, such as the analytic and exploration techniques of mineral deposit, hydrogeology, engineering geology, environmental geology, karst geology, exploration geophysics and geochemistry.

It is also active in research on paleontology, and was involved in identification of new dinosaurs, including Zhenyuanlong, Xixiasaurus, and a new type of tyrannosaur Qianzhousaurus. as well as other animals such as Castorocauda and Rugosodon.

== Affiliated institutes ==
The following institutes are affiliated with the Chinese Academy of Geological Sciences:

- Institute of Hydrogeology and Environmental Geology (IHEG), CAGS, China
- Institute of Geophysical and Geochemical Exploration
- Institute of Geomechanics, CAGS, China
- Institute of Geology, CAGS, China
- Institute of Mineral Resources (IMR), CAGS, China
- National Research Center for Geoanalysis
- Tianjin Institute of Geology and Mineral Resources (TIGMR), CAGS, China
- Institute of Karst Geology, CAGS
- Beijing SHRIMP Center

== See also ==
- Chinese Academy of Sciences
- International Union of Geological Sciences — currently headquartered here.
