= State Bureau of Surveying and Mapping =

Defunct Chinese mapping and surveying agency

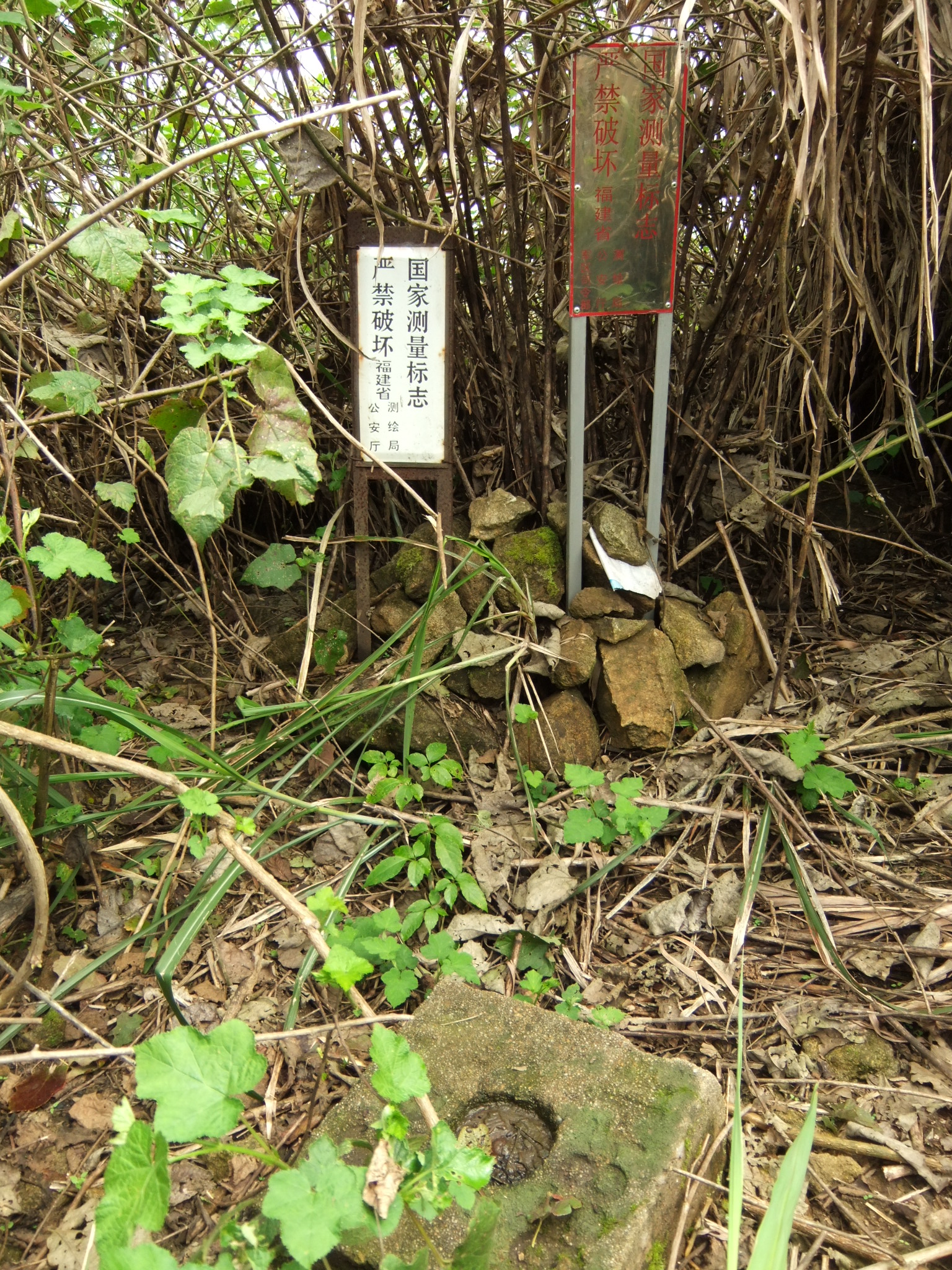
A China National Survey marker in Jin Mt, Gaotou Township, Fujian

The State Bureau of Surveying and Mapping (Chinese: 国家测绘地理信息局; pinyin: Guójiā cèhuì dìlǐ xìnxī jú) was the central agency that was responsible for surveying and mapping in the People's Republic of China (PRC). It was established in 1959 and was made defunct in March 2018.

== History ==
The bureau was established in 1959.

In January 2018, a rule was introduced stating that all maps had to be approved by the State Bureau of Surveying and Mapping prior to publishing, republishing, import or export. This rule affects maps printed in the PRC but for a foreign audience. In March 2018, the 13th National People's Congress announced that the newly formed Ministry of Natural Resources shall replace the functions of the Ministry of Land & Resources, State Oceanic Administration and the State Bureau of Surveying and Mapping as part of the deepening the reform of the Party and state institutions.

== See also ==
- List of national mapping agencies
- Restrictions on geographic data in China
- Chinese Academy of Surveying and Mapping
