= Ranks of the People's Armed Police =

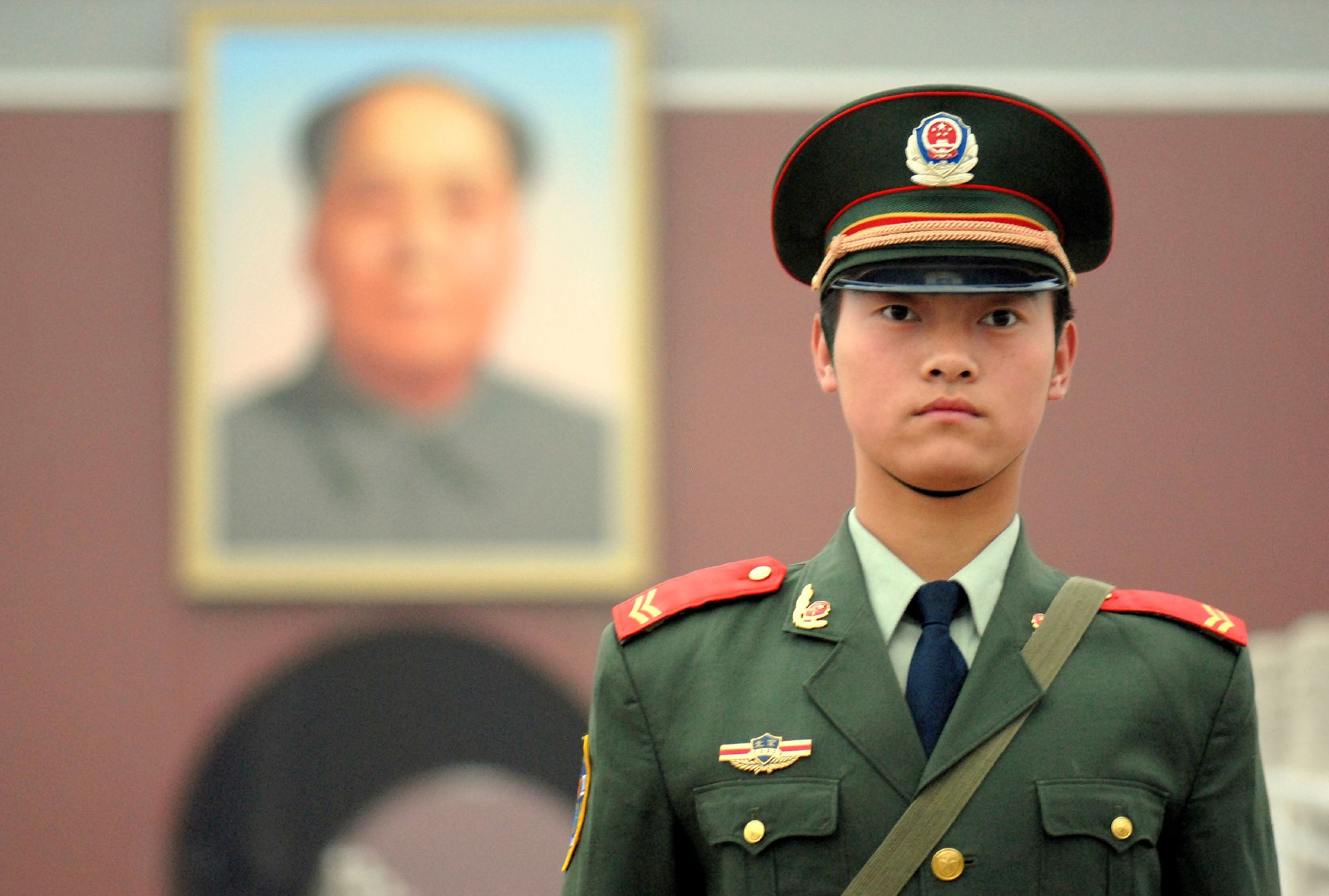
A Wǔjǐng shàngděngbīng from the armed police internal security force, wearing the 87-style spring and autumn uniform of the armed police, at Tiananmen Square.

The ranks in the Chinese People's Armed Police (PAP) are similar to those of the Chinese People's Liberation Army, with the prefix 武警 (Wǔjǐng) meaning "armed police". In addition to a similar rank structure, the PAP also follows PLA regulations. PAP guards are also recruited at the same time and through the same procedures as PLA soldiers. However, the PAP has its own education and training system separate from the PLA.

== Officers ==
Title	武警上将 Wǔjǐng shàng jiàng	武警中将 Wǔjǐng zhōng jiàng	武警少将 Wǔjǐng shàojiàng	武警大校 Wǔjǐng dàxiào	武警上校 Wǔjǐng shàngxiào	武警中校 Wǔjǐng zhong xiao	武警少校 Wǔjǐng shàoxiào	武警上尉 Wǔjǐng shàngwèi	武警中尉 Wǔjǐng zhōngwèi	武警少尉 Wǔjǐng shàowèi	武警学员 Wǔjǐng xuéyuán
Equivalent translation	General	Lieutenant general	Major general	Senior colonel	Colonel	Lieutenant colonel	Major	Captain	1st lieutenant	2nd lieutenant	Officer cadet
Shoulder Insignia											
Collar Insignia											

== Other ranks ==
Title (Pre-2022)	武警一级警士长 Wǔjǐng yī jí jǐng shì zhǎng	武警二级警士长 Wǔjǐng èr jí jǐng shì zhǎng	武警三级警士长 Wǔjǐng sān jí jǐng shì zhǎng	武警四级警士长 Wǔjǐng sì jí jǐng shì zhǎng	武警上士 Wǔjǐng shàng shì	武警中士 Wǔjǐng zhōng shì	武警下士 Wǔjǐng xiàshì	武警上等兵 Wǔjǐng shàngděngbīng	武警列兵 Wǔjǐng lièbīng
Title (Post-2022)	武警一级警士长 Wǔjǐng yī jí jǐng shì zhǎng	武警二级警士长 Wǔjǐng èr jí jǐng shì zhǎng	武警三级警士长 Wǔjǐng sān jí jǐng shì zhǎng	武警一级上士 Wǔjǐng yī jí shàng shì	武警二级上士 Wǔjǐng èr jí shàng shì	武警中士 Wǔjǐng zhōng shì	武警下士 Wǔjǐng xiàshì	武警上等兵 Wǔjǐng shàngděngbīng	武警列兵 Wǔjǐng lièbīng
Equivalent translation (Pre-2022)	Master Sergeant 1st class	Master Sergeant 2nd class	Master Sergeant 3rd class	Master sergeant 4th class	Staff sergeant	Sergeant	Corporal	Private 1st class	Private
Equivalent translation (Post-2022)	Master Sergeant 1st class	Master Sergeant 2nd class	Master Sergeant 3rd class	Staff sergeant 1st Class	Staff sergeant 2nd Class	Sergeant	Corporal	Private 1st class	Private
Shoulder Insignia									
Collar Insignia									

== Historical rank systems ==
Officers

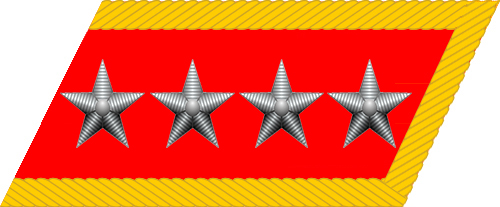
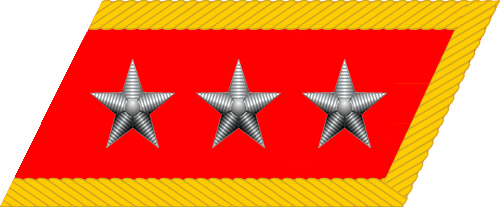
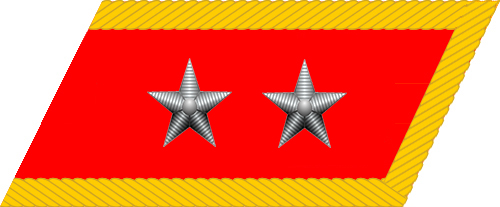
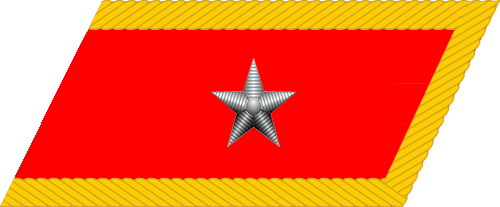
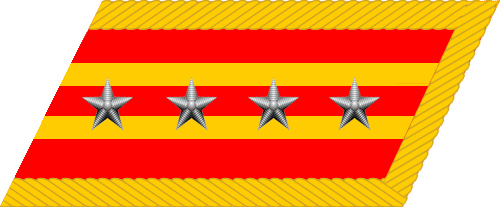
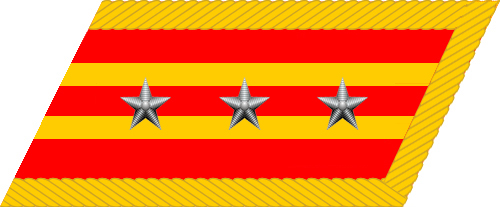
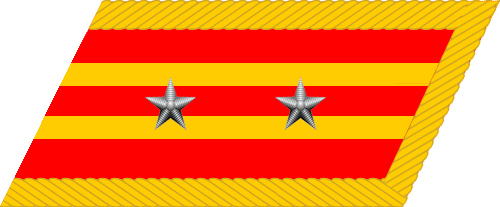
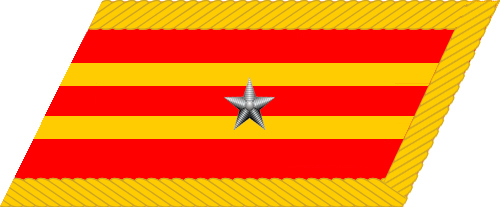
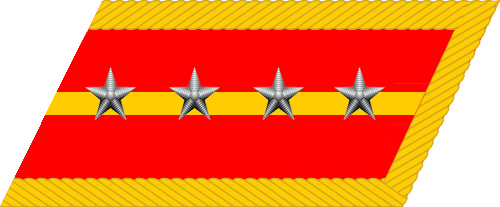
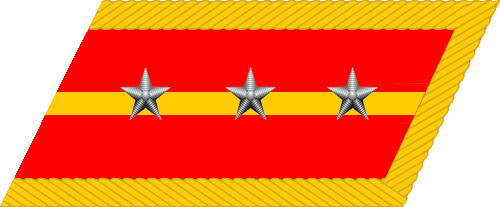
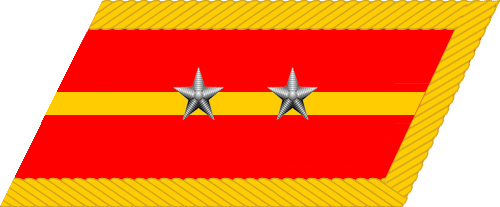
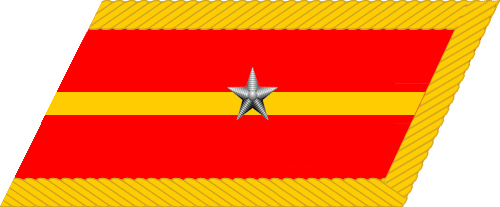
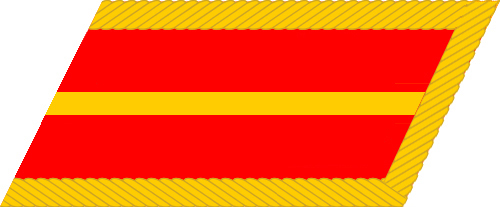
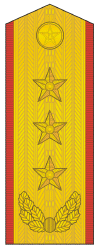
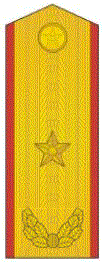
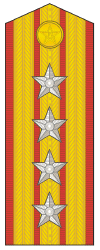
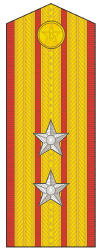
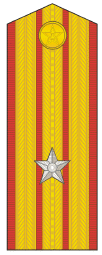
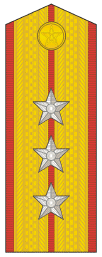
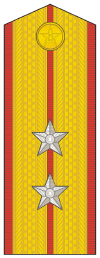
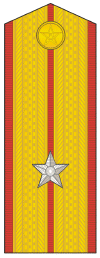
Rank group	General / flag officers				Senior officers				Junior officers
PSF-PLA (1955–1965)
PSF-PLA (1955–1965)	大将; Dà jiàng	上将; Shàngjiàng	中将; Zhōngjiàng	少将; Shàojiàng	大校; Dàxiào	上校; Shàngxiào	中校; Zhōngxiào	少校; Shàoxiào	大尉; Dàwèi	上尉; Shàngwèi	中尉; Zhōngwèi	少尉; Shàowèi	准尉; Zhǔnwèi
Collar insignia (adopted 1958)
People's Armed Police (1988–1994)
People's Armed Police (1988–1994)	大将; Dà jiàng	上将; Shàngjiàng	中将; Zhōngjiàng	少将; Shàojiàng	大校; Dàxiào	上校; Shàngxiào	中校; Zhōngxiào	少校; Shàoxiào	大尉; Dàwèi		中尉; Zhōngwèi	少尉; Shàowèi	准尉; Zhǔnwèi

Non-commissioned officers and enlisted

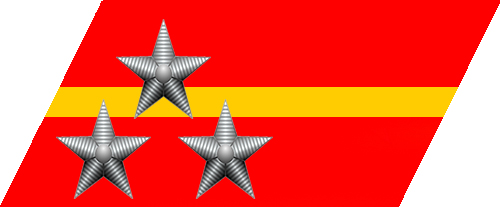
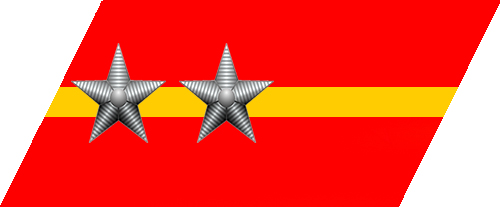
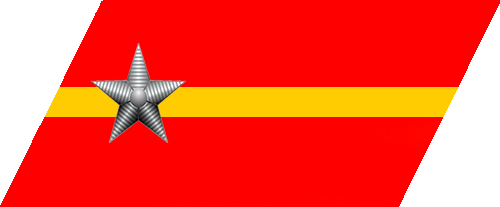
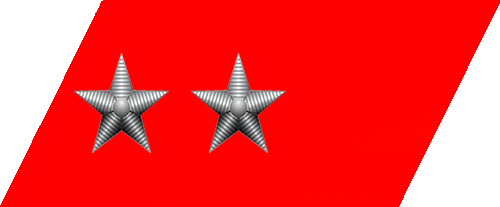
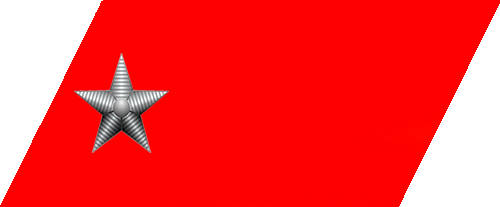
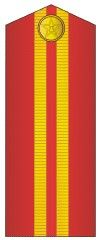
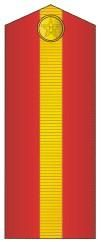
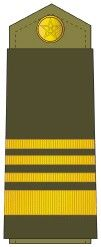
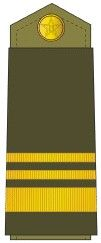
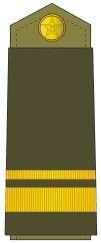
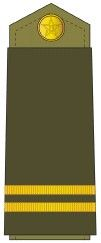
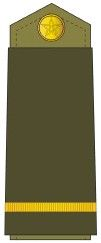
Rank group	Senior NCOs				Junior NCOs	Enlisted
People's Armed Police (1955–1965)
People's Armed Police (1955–1965)			上士; Shàng shì	中士; Zhōng shì	下士; Xià shì	上等兵; Shàngděngbīng	列兵; Lièbīng
People's Armed Police (1988–1994)
People's Armed Police (1988–1994)	一级军士长; Yī jí jūnshì zhǎng	二级军士长; Èr jí jūnshì zhǎng	上士; Shàng shì	中士; Zhōng shì	下士; Xià shì	上等兵; Shàngděngbīng	列兵; Lièbīng

== See also ==
- Grades of the armed forces of China
- Ranks of the People's Liberation Army Ground Force
- Ranks of the People's Liberation Army Navy
- Ranks of the People's Liberation Army Air Force
- Republic of China Armed Forces rank insignia
