= Long Tân =

Long Tân may refer to:

- commune Long Tân, Bà Rịa–Vũng Tàu in Đất Đỏ District, Bà Rịa–Vũng Tàu Province
- commune Long Tân, Bình Phước in Bù Gia Mập District, Bình Phước Province
- commune Long Tan, Đồng Nai in Nhơn Trạch District, Đồng Nai Province
- commune Long Tân, Bình Dương in Dầu Tiếng District, Bình Dương Province
- commune Long Tân, Sóc Trăng in Ngã Năm District, Sóc Trăng Province
- Battle of Long Tan
