= Ministry of Natural Resources (China) =

Chinese government agency for resource management

Ministry of Natural Resources of the People's Republic of China
- 中华人民共和国自然资源部; Zhōnghuá Rénmín Gònghéguó Zìránzīyuánbù
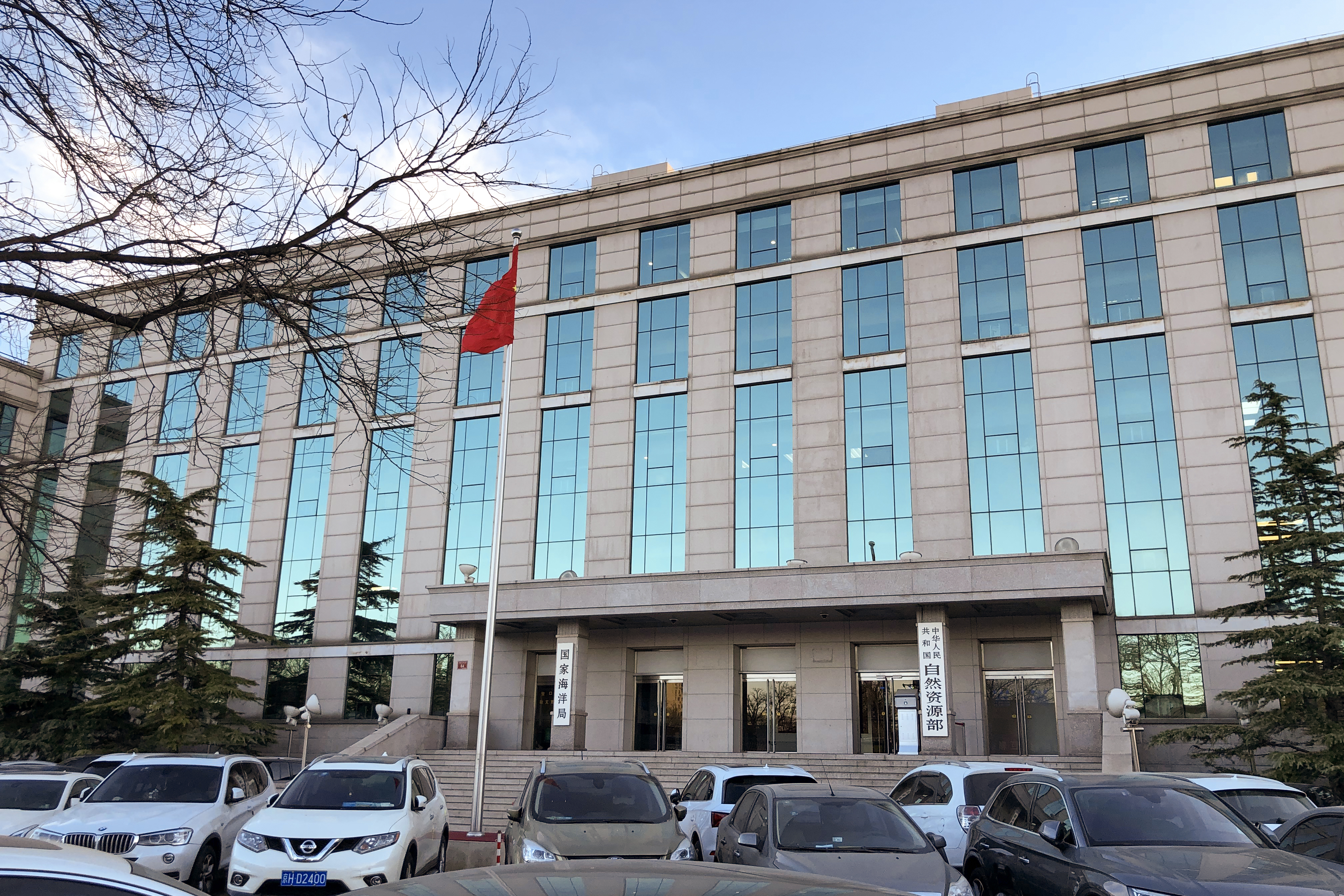

Agency overview
- Formed: 19 March 2018; 8 years ago
- Preceding agencies: Ministry of Land and Resources; State Bureau of Surveying and Mapping; State Oceanic Administration
- Type: Constituent department of the State Council (cabinet-level executive department)
- Jurisdiction: Government of China
- Headquarters: Beijing
- Minister responsible: Guan Zhi'ou, Minister
- Deputy Ministers responsible: Wang Hong, Director of State Oceanic Administration; Zhuang Shaoqin; Xu Dachun; Liu Guohong
- Agency executives: Wei Shanzhong, Leader of Discipline Inspection & Supervision Team; Vacant, Director of National Forestry and Grassland Administration; Li Jinfa, Director of China Geological Survey
- Parent agency: State Council
- Child agencies: National Forestry and Grasslands Administration (NFGA); Polar Research Institute of China
- Website: www.mnr.gov.cn

Chinese name
- Simplified Chinese: 中华人民共和国自然资源部
- Traditional Chinese: 中華人民共和國自然資源部
Transcriptions
Standard Mandarin
- Hanyu Pinyin: Zhōnghuá Rénmín Gònghéguó Zìránzīyuánbù

The Ministry of Natural Resources is an executive-department of the State Council of China which is responsible for natural resources in the country. It is the 14th-ranking department of the State Council.

It was formed on 19 March 2018, taking on the responsibilities of the now-defunct Ministry of Land and Resources, State Bureau of Surveying and Mapping and State Oceanic Administration, with additional responsibilities coming from other departments and ministries.

== History ==
On March 19, 2018, the simultaneous creation of the Ministry of Natural Resources and dissolution of the Ministry of Land and Resources, State Oceanic Administration, and State Bureau of Surveying and Mapping was announced as part of the deepening the reform of the Party and state institutions. That same day, Lu Hao was elected Minister of Natural Resources.

In 2019, the Ministry held its first international forum on nature protection.

On August 26, 2019, President Xi Jinping signed Presidential Decree No. 32 of the People's Republic of China, announcing the Decision of the Standing Committee of the National People's Congress on the Amendment of the Land Administration Law of the People's Republic of China and the Urban Real Estate Administration Law of the People's Republic of China, which decides to transfer the responsibility for the reform and management of rural residential bases nationwide from the Ministry of Natural Resources to the Ministry of Agriculture and Rural Affairs.

On August 31, 2020, according to the National Development and Reform Commission's Implementing Opinions on Comprehensively Pushing Forward the Reform of Delinking Industry Associations and Chambers of Commerce from Administrative Organs (NDRC [2019] No. 1063), 10 industry associations (chambers of commerce), including the China Federation of Mining and Mining, which were formerly under the supervision of the Ministry of Natural Resources, were dissociated from the Ministry of Natural Resources.

== Functions ==
According to regulations concerning the Ministry, it is responsible for regulating, managing, registering, and exploiting the natural resources in China including land, minerals, forests, grasslands, wetlands and water. It is also responsible for ecological restoration, protecting arable land, geological land exploration, granting permits for undersea cables and pipelines, upholding maritime interests and rights, coordinating and managing urban and rural planning, as well as surveying and registering water resources. The Ministry administers the National Forestry and Grasslands Administration.

The Ministry continued efforts begun in 2006 under the Ministry of Land and Resources to curb misclassification of land (for example, local authorities incorrectly labeling farmland as available for urbanization). This includes the use of a National Natural Resources Inspector (formerly the National Land Supervision Inspector) and the use of regional land supervision bureaus to increase oversight on local authorities. These efforts have significantly curtailed land misclassification.

The Ministry has a significant role in shaping environmental education in China. It supports environmental education in China's national parks, nature parks, and environmentally-protected areas.

- Responsibilities of the former Ministry of Land and Resources
- Responsibilities of the former State Oceanic Administration
- Responsibilities of the former State Bureau of Surveying and Mapping
- Responsibilities of organizing and planning the major-function oriented zone (Responsibilities of National Development and Reform Commission)
- Responsibilities of urban and rural planning management (Responsibilities of Ministry of Housing and Urban-Rural Development)
- Responsibilities of water resources survey and the management of the registration of the right (Responsibilities of Ministry of Water Resources)
- Responsibilities of grassland resources survey and the management of the registration of the right (Responsibilities of Ministry of Agriculture)
- Responsibilities of forest, wetland, national parks, and other resources survey and registration management (Responsibilities of State Forestry and Grassland Administration)

== See also ==
- Tsunami Advisory Center of the Ministry of National Resources
