= Ministry of Land and Resources =

Former government agency, dissolved 2018

Ministry of Land and Resources of the People's Republic of China
- 中华人民共和国国土资源部; Zhōnghuá Rénmín Gònghéguó Guótǔ Zīyuánbù
- National emblem of China

Agency overview
- Formed: March 10, 1998
- Dissolved: March 19, 2018
- Jurisdiction: Government of China
- Headquarters: Beijing, China
- Minister responsible: Jiang Daming
- Parent agency: State Council
- Website: mlr.gov.cn (archived)

The Ministry of Land and Resources (MLR) was a constitute department from 1998 to 2018 of the State Council of China. It was responsible for the regulation, management, preservation and exploitation of natural resources, such as land, mines and oceans. In 2018, it was dissolved and its functions were re-organized into the Ministry of Natural Resources.

== History ==
On March 10, 1998, the 9th National People's Congress passed the "Reform Plan of the Ministries of the State Council". According to the plan, Ministry of Geology & Mineral Resources, State Administration of National Land, State Oceanic Administration, and State Bureau of Surveying and Mapping merged to form the Ministry of Land and Resources. The State Administration of National Oceans and the State Bureau of Surveying and Mapping remained existing as departments under the jurisdiction of the newly formed Ministry.

Beginning in 1999 and continuing through 2017, the Ministry released comprehensive data on mineral exploration by province.

In 2006, to curb misclassification of land (for example, local authorities incorrectly labeling farmland as available for urbanization), the Ministry established a National Land Supervision Inspector and several regional Land Supervision Bureaus to monitor local governments. These efforts continued following the reorganization of the Ministry and significantly curtailed land misclassification.

In 2018, the Ministry was re-organized into the Ministry of Natural Resources as part of the deepening the reform of the Party and state institutions.

== List of ministers ==
| No. | Name | Took office | Left office | Notes |
|---|---|---|---|---|
| 1 | Zhou Yongkang | March 1998 | December 1999 | Later Politburo Standing Committee (2007–2012); Later investigated for corruption |
| 2 | Tian Fengshan | December 1999 | October 2003 | Convicted of corruption and sentenced to prison |
| 3 | Sun Wensheng (孙文盛) | October 2003 | April 2007 | |
| 4 | Xu Shaoshi | April 2007 | 16 March 2013 | Later Director of the National Development and Reform Commission |
| 5 | Jiang Daming | 16 March 2013 | 19 March 2018 | |

== See also ==
- Geography of China
- Geology of China
- Archeology of China
- Geographic Information Systems in China
- Ministries of China
