= Longtan Dam =

Dam in Tian'e County, Guangxi, China

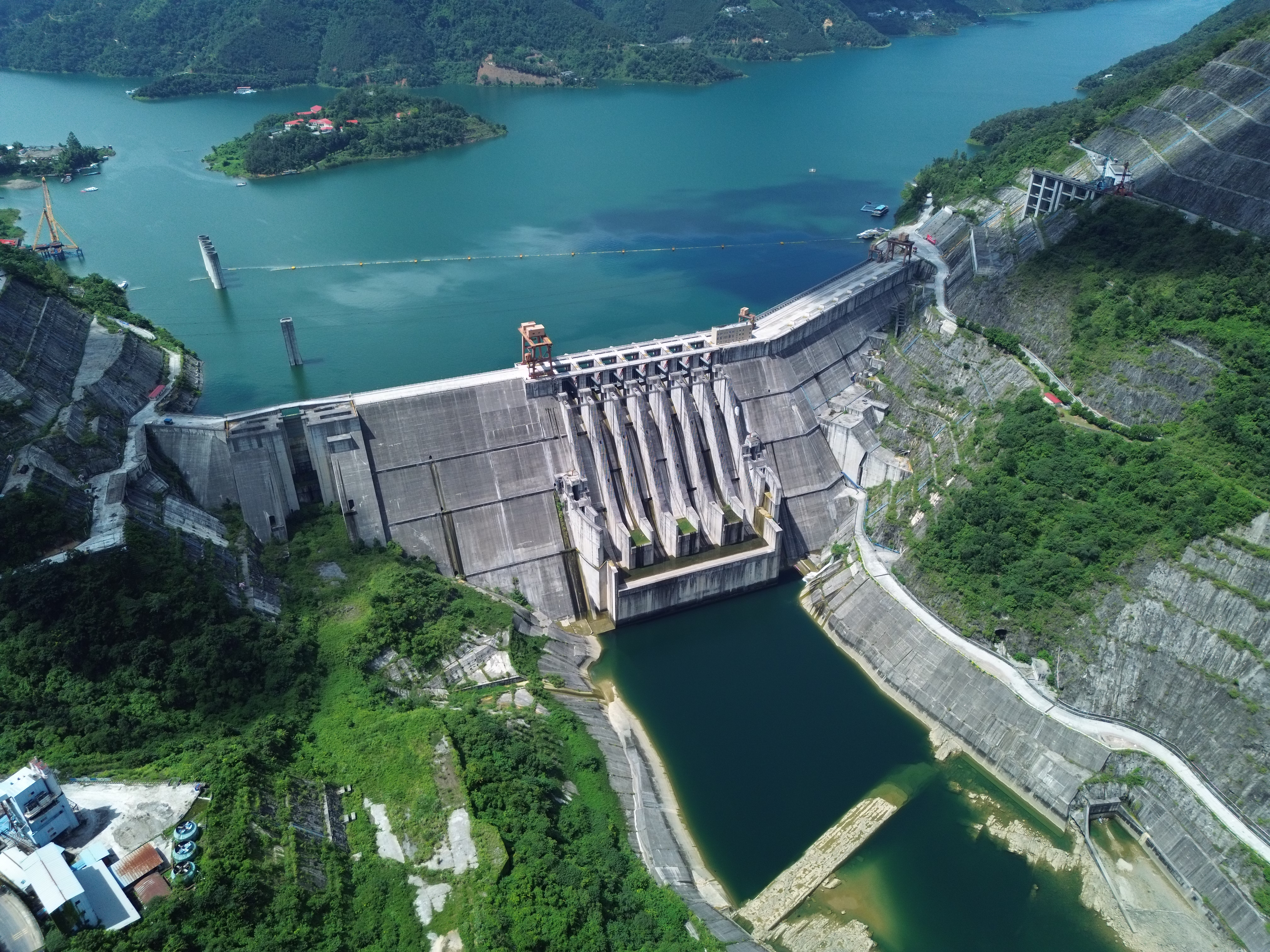
- Longtan Dam

- Location within China
- Interactive map of Longtan Dam
- Official name: 龙滩大坝
- Country: China
- Location: Tian'e County, Guangxi
- Coordinates: 25°01′38″N 107°02′51″E
- Status: In use
- Construction began: 2001
- Opening date: 2009
- Construction cost: US$4.2 billion
- Owners: Longtan Hydropower Development Co., Ltd.

Dam and spillways
- Type of dam: Gravity
- Impounds: Hongshui River
- Height: 216.2 m (709 ft)
- Length: 849 m (2,785 ft)
- Dam volume: 7,670,000 m^{3} (10,031,981 cu yd)
- Spillway type: Service, controlled
- Spillway capacity: 27,134 m^{3}/s (958,228 cu ft/s) (max flood)

Reservoir
- Creates: Longtan Reservoir
- Total capacity: 27,270,000,000 m^{3} (22,108,149 acre⋅ft)
- Active capacity: 20,530,000,000 m^{3} (16,643,942 acre⋅ft)
- Catchment area: 98,500 km^{2} (38,031 sq mi)
- Normal elevation: 400 m (1,312 ft)

Power Station
- Commission date: 2007-2009
- Hydraulic head: 179 m (587 ft) (max.)
- Turbines: 9 × 714 MW Francis-type
- Installed capacity: 6,426 MW
- Annual generation: 18,700 GWh (estimate)

Longtan Dam (simplified Chinese: 龙滩大坝; traditional Chinese: 龍灘大壩; pinyin: Lóngtān Dàbà) is a large roller-compacted concrete (RCC) gravity dam on the Hongshui River in Tian'e County of the Guangxi Zhuang Autonomous Region, China, a tributary of the Xi River and the Pearl River. The dam is 216.2 metres (709.3 ft) high and 849 m (2,785 ft) long; it is the tallest of its type in the world. The dam is intended for hydroelectric power production, flood control and navigation. The dam contains seven surface spillways, two bottom outlets and an underground power station. The Longtan ship lift, part of the dam complex, will be the tallest ship lift system in the world.

== Construction ==
The dam was planned in the 1950s, but preliminary construction (roads, bridges, river diversion) did not begin until the 1940s. Formal construction began on the project July 1, 2001, and the river was diverted by November 2003. A total of 20,000,000 m^{3} (706,293,334 ft^{3}) of material were excavated from the dam site. Impounding of the 27,270,000,000 m^{3} (22,108,149 acre⋅ft) reservoir began in 2006, and the dam's first of three operational hydroelectric generating units was testing May 2007. In 2009, the last generator became operational and the installed capacity increased to 6,426 MW, its annual generation is estimated at 18.7 TWh.

A pair of tunnels diverted the river around the site of the dam, during construction.

== Navigation ==
The dam will submerge over 300 shoals, which had rendered the upper Hongshui unnavigable. The Longtan ship lift will be able to lift vessels of up to 500 tonnes. Chinese officials assert the dam and ship lift will turn the Hongshui into a "golden waterway" for reaching landlocked Guizhou and Guangxi provinces.

== See also ==
- List of power stations in China
- List of dams and reservoirs in China
