= China Coast Guard =

Coast guard of China

China Coast Guard 中国海警局
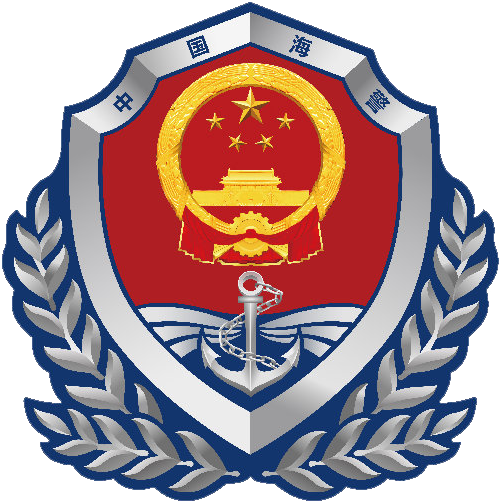
- Emblem of China Coast Guard

- Racing stripe
- Common name: Haijing (海警) China Coast Guard Bureau (中国海警局)

Agency overview
- Formed: 22 July 2013; 13 years ago
- Preceding agencies: China Marine Surveillance; China Fishery Law Enforcement; General Directorate of Customs Anti-Smuggling Bureau; People's Armed Police Border Defense Corps Coast Guard
- Employees: 16,296 personnel (2018)

Jurisdictional structure
- Operations jurisdiction: China
- Constituting instrument: Coast Guard Law of the People's Republic of China《中华人民共和国海警法》
- General nature: Civilian police
- Specialist jurisdiction: Coastal patrol, marine border protection, marine search and rescue

Operational structure
- Headquarters: 1 Fuxingmen Outer Street, Beijing, China
- Agency executives: PAP Major General Wang Zhongcai, Director Commandant of the Coast Guard; Major General Wang Liangfu, Political commissar
- Parent agency: People's Armed Police

Facilities
- Boats: 164 cutters Multiple patrol boats (2018)
- Aircraft: Harbin Z-9; Harbin Y-12

Website
- www.ccg.gov.cn

China Coast Guard
- Simplified Chinese: 中国海警局
- Traditional Chinese: 中國海警局
Transcriptions
Standard Mandarin
- Hanyu Pinyin: Zhōngguó Hǎijǐngjú

Haijing ("Coast Guard")
- Chinese: 海警
Transcriptions
Standard Mandarin
- Hanyu Pinyin: Hǎijǐng

The China Coast Guard (CCG; 中国海警局) is the maritime security, search and rescue, and law enforcement service branch of the People's Armed Police (PAP) of China. The emergency number of the Coast Guard is 95110, which began operation in 2019.

Between 2013 and 2023, the CCG confiscated a total of 9.875 tonnes of drugs, 21 billion RMB worth of smuggled goods and 12 million tonnes of stolen sand, along with responding to over 53,000 emergency calls and handling 24,000 cases.

== History ==
Prior to 2013, five Chinese departments had maritime law enforcement responsibilities leading to "waste, inefficiency, and disarray". In March 2013, the National People's Congress (NPC) authorized the creation of the CCG under the State Oceanic Administration (SOA). The CCG combined the SOA's China Marine Surveillance (CMS), the Ministry of Agriculture's China Fishery Law Enforcement (CFLE), the Ministry of Public Security's (MPS) People's Armed Police Border Defense Corps Coast Guard, and the General Directorate of Customs Anti-Smuggling Bureau's Maritime elements. Locally controlled and funded CMS and CFLE units remained separate. The Ministry of Transport's Maritime Safety Administration (MSA) and search and rescue organizations were not merged, possibly to reduce the difficulty of the reorganization or to allow the MSA to be continue to be differentiated from the more aggressive CCG for foreign relations purposes. The CCG was officially created on 22 July 2013.

The 2013 CCG did not become an integrated service and the intended synergies failed to materialize. The founding organizations retained separate identities, missions, and cultures. The chain of command was unclear. Although technically subordinate to the SOA, the MPS had the authority to give "operational guidance" and Meng Hongwei, a vice-minister of the MPS, was appointed as head of the CCG. The MPS also staffed the nominally civilian CCG with personnel from its own paramilitary PAP. By April 2018, the CCG was unable to resolve these problems.

The CCG was reorganized in 2018 to be a part of the Chinese armed forces. The PAP was subordinated only to the Central Military Commission and received control of the CCG. By 2019, the CCG was commanded by Rear Admiral Wang Zhongcai of the People's Liberation Army Navy (PLAN). The SOA was abolished with most of its civilian researchers and administrators transferring to the Ministry of Natural Resources, which "renounced any role in maritime law enforcement". Local CMS and CFLE units remained separate. On 22 June, the NPC authorized the transfer of the CCG to the PAP on 1 July; The CCG's missions were unchanged by the reforms.

Legal reform followed the 2018 reorganization. When the CCG was created it continued to operate under the pre-2013 legal framework used by the separate organizations. In 2020, the CCG's role in maritime criminal cases was clarified. In January 2021, the NPC passed a law standardizing CCG operations and clarifying the authorization for the use of force; the law permitted the use of lethal force to enforce Chinese territorial claims.

In June 2024, the CCG was authorized to detain foreign vessels and persons for up to 60 days.

== Functions ==
The CCG duty is to perform regular patrols and reactive actions (such as Search and Rescue) on the coastal, near sea, and open ocean areas of its jurisdiction (and international waters). These actions include principally law enforcement tasks such as interdicting smuggling, illegal fisheries control, and protecting the environment (such as stopping coral fishing and pollutant dumping).

The CCG also serves as an armed border guard, protecting China's claimed maritime borders, which often leads to conflict and controversy. As a constituent part of the Chinese Armed Forces (being subordinate to the PAP), on wartime it would be placed under the operational control of the People's Liberation Army Navy, in which case it would be likely to play support roles and rear-area escort (like its USCG counterparts, which is also a branch of the military, its ships are not equipped for full military combat).

=== Law enforcement ===
The first set of duties of the CCG according to the China Coast Guard Law include seven law enforcement tasks:

1. fighting maritime violations and crimes,
2. preserving maritime safety and security,
3. development and utilization of marine resources,
4. marine ecological and environmental protection,
5. management of marine fishery resources,
6. carrying out anti-smuggling tasks on the sea,
7. coordinating and guiding local maritime law enforcement.

=== Maritime safety ===
Another set of responsibilities come from maritime safety. While maritime safety, SAR, and the enforcement of the rules of marine safety is the main remit of the China Maritime Safety Administration, and the leading organ in active SAR is the China Rescue and Salvage Bureau, the CCG, as the main maritime law enforcement agency, is involved very often in rescue operations. It also supports the CMSA in enforcing maritime safety rules and inspect ships suspected of presenting risks to navigation.

=== International cooperation ===
International cooperation and coordination is one of the official tasks of the CCG. Part of this is cooperation with friendly nations for mutually beneficial tasks (such as cooperating with Russia in fishery operations, as part of the plan for the opening and operation of an Arctic passage). More critical is cooperation with neighboring states on matters of mutual interest, in particular fisheries and smuggling. The frequency of that cooperation often correlates with the state of bilateral relationships, but institutional connections do remain continuously active.

In the 2000s and early 2010s, the Chinese Coast Guard (Before 2013, the Maritime Police and China Marine Surveillance) conducted periodic joint-training sessions with other navies in the North Pacific, including the US Coast Guard service. The Chinese Coast Guard has also participated in the annual North Pacific Coast Guard Agencies Forum in Alaska, along with the US, Canadian, Japanese, South Korean, and Russian Coast Guards. As part of an exchange program, around 109 members of the Chinese Coast Guard service have served on U.S. Coast Guard cutters.

Badge of the People's Armed Police Border Defense Corps Coast Guard

The worsening of US-China relationships in the last few years (as of 2024), in particular the ongoing conflict regarding the South China Sea (in which the CCG is directly involved) have all but ended the co-training missions with the USCG, although the purely civilian CMSA still keeps a very close working relationship with its counterparts in the US and Japan.

=== Territorial sovereignty and rights protection ===
As China's claims of sovereign waters are extensive and overlap with several other countries, enforcing this doctrine has created a very large number of incidents and controversies involving the CCG. These often escalate to skirmishes and tense brinkmanship in what has been called grey-zone operations. The CCG is at the forefront of these incidents (often alongside the People's Armed Forces Maritime Militia). The probable reason for that usage, according to international analysts is that putting the paramilitary "White Hulls" (the CCG) and the "Blue Hulls" (the PAFMM) at the forefront avoids the dangerous escalation that would happen if the unambiguously military "Gray Hulls" (the PLAN) were involved in an incident.

The CCG is very active in patrolling those rights. The result is a significant number of incidents of varying levels of tension. In 2019, the United States issued a warning to China over aggressive and unsafe action by their Coast Guard and maritime militia. In 2023, the Coast Guard used water cannons on Philippine coast guard ships in contested waters. In 2024, the PAFMM and CCG entered into a tense standoff with the Philippines over the Second Thomas Shoal. In 2026, Chinese researchers have proposed using drones in the air, on the water and underwater to defend islands and reefs in the South China Sea. The CCG Academy and Dalian Maritime University, would use these unmanned systems to watch the area and respond to threats, reducing the need for troops.

== Organization ==
Following the 2018 reforms, the CCG hierarchy - from senior to junior - are the CCG Bureau in Beijing, the regional branch bureaus (Chinese: 海区分局; pinyin: haiqu fenju), the provincial-level bureaus (Chinese: 省级海警局; pinyin: shengji haijing ju), the municipal-level bureaus (Chinese: 市级海警局; pinyin: shiji haijing ju) and work stations (Chinese: 工作站; pinyin: gongzuo zhan).

There are currently 3 regional bureaus:

- East Sea Bureau
- South Sea Bureau
- North Sea Bureau

The provincial and municipal bureaus conduct coastal missions. These are 11 such bureaus (Fujian, Guangdong, Guangxi, Hainan, Heibei, Jiangsu, Liaoning, Shandong, Shanghai, Tianjin, Zhejiang), one for each coastal region.

The Jiangsu, Shanghai, Zhejiang and Fujian bureaus are part of the East Sea Bureau, the Guangdong, Guangxi and Hainan bureaus are part of the South Sea Bureau and the Liaoning, Hebei, Tianjin and Shandong Bureaus are part of the North Sea Bureau.

The regional bureaus also control "directly subordinate bureaus" (Chinese: 直属局; pinyin: zhishi ju) which control most of the large cutters and execute most sovereignty enforcement missions. These bureaus and their locations are:

- 1st (Shanghai) - part of the East Sea Bureau
- 2nd (Ningbo, Zhejiang) - part of the East Sea Bureau
- 3rd (Guangzhou, Guangdong) - part of the South Sea Bureau
- 4th (Wenchang, Hainan) - part of the South Sea Bureau
- 5th (Sanya, Hainan) - part of the South Sea Bureau
- 6th (Qingdao, Shandong) - part of the North Sea Bureau

=== Aviation units ===
The CCG operates 3 aircraft groups, with each regional bureau operating one aircraft group.

- 1st Aviation Group - Headquarters in Zhoushan Putuoshan International Airport, part of East Sea Bureau
- 2nd Aviation Group - Headquarters in Zhuhai Jinwan Airport, part of South Sea Bureau. Operates Z-9 helicopters.
- 3rd Aviation Group - Headquarters in Jinan Pingyin Agricultural airport (济南平阴农用机场), part of North Sea Bureau. Operates Z-9 helicopters.

== Equipment ==
Some Chinese Coast Guardsmen have night vision devices.

=== Firearms ===
Chinese coast guard personnel are most commonly seen with QBZ-95 rifles.

=== Vessels ===
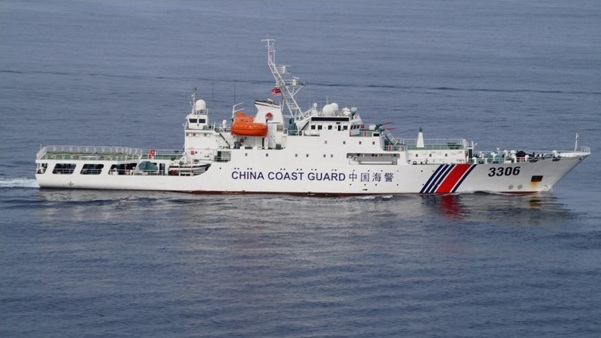
China Coast Guard Shucha II-class Cutter Haijing 3306, now renamed to Haijing 3301

=== Aircraft ===
The Chinese Coast Guard has used modified versions of the Xi'an MA60 airliner known as the MA60H as a marine patrol aircraft. The Harbin Z-9 and Wing Loong II UAV have also been used by the Chinese Coast Guard.

== Personnel ==
CCG ships are staffed by People's Armed Police personnel. China Coast Guard Academy is a dedicated institution that provides training for personnel entering the CCG.

The CCG have been seen with aerial assault boarding units which deploy from helicopters along with diving units.

=== Line of duty deaths ===
There is currently one recorded LODD of CCG personnel.

Rank and name	Chinese name	Badge number	End of watch	Unit	Cause
Sergeant Wang Xiaolong	汪晓龙	0115479	2023-03-24	Guangdong Coast Guard Bureau, Shanwei Municipal Coast Guard Bureau, Chengqu Coast Guard Station	Killed by speedboat propeller after falling into water during struggle while conducting a smuggling interdiction mission. Another coast guardsman, Lin Qingping was heavily injured but survived the incident.

=== Ranks ===
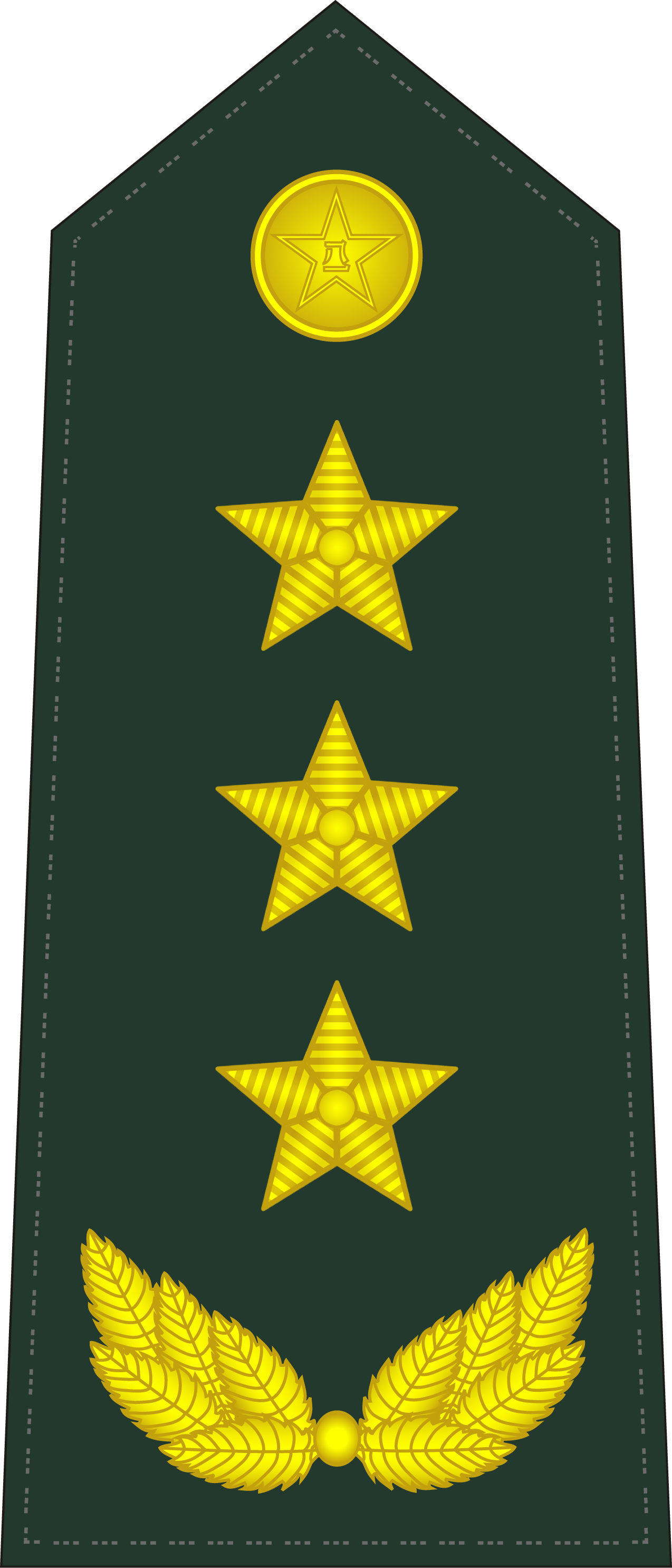
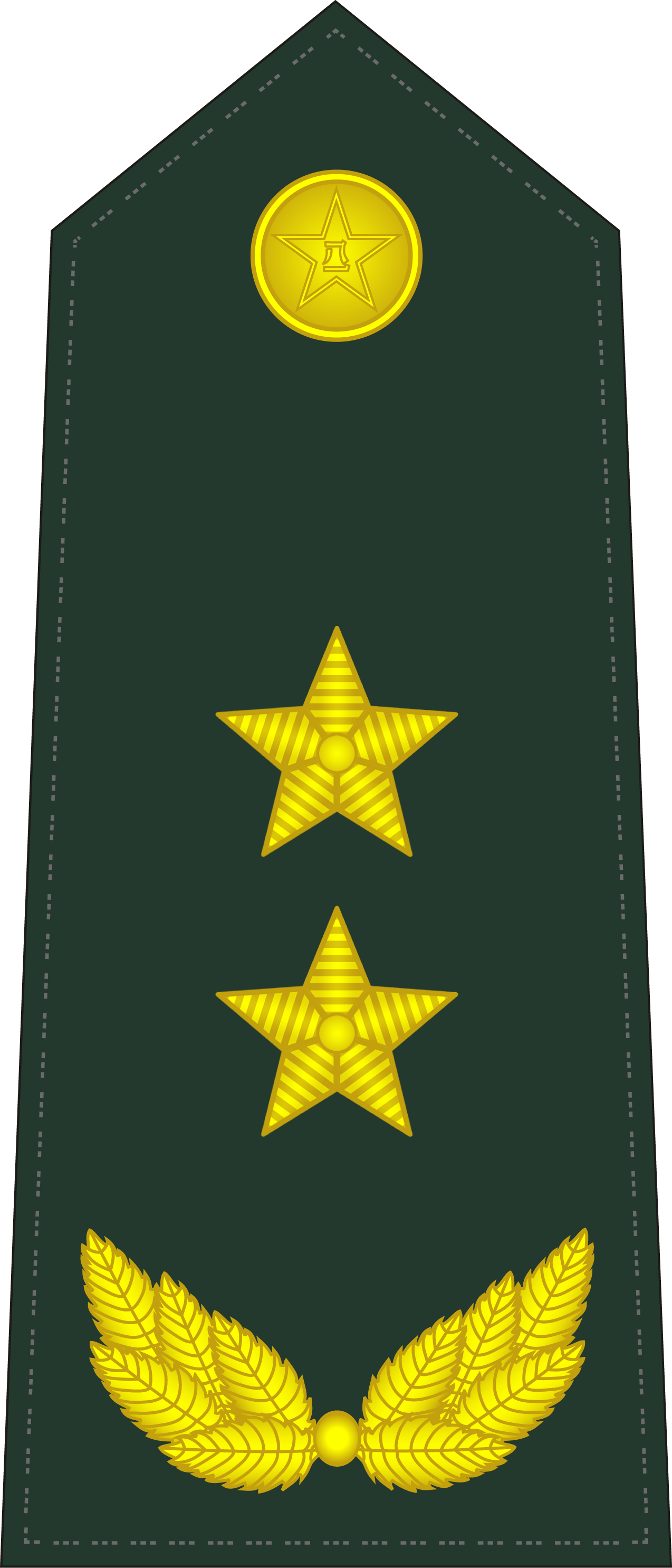
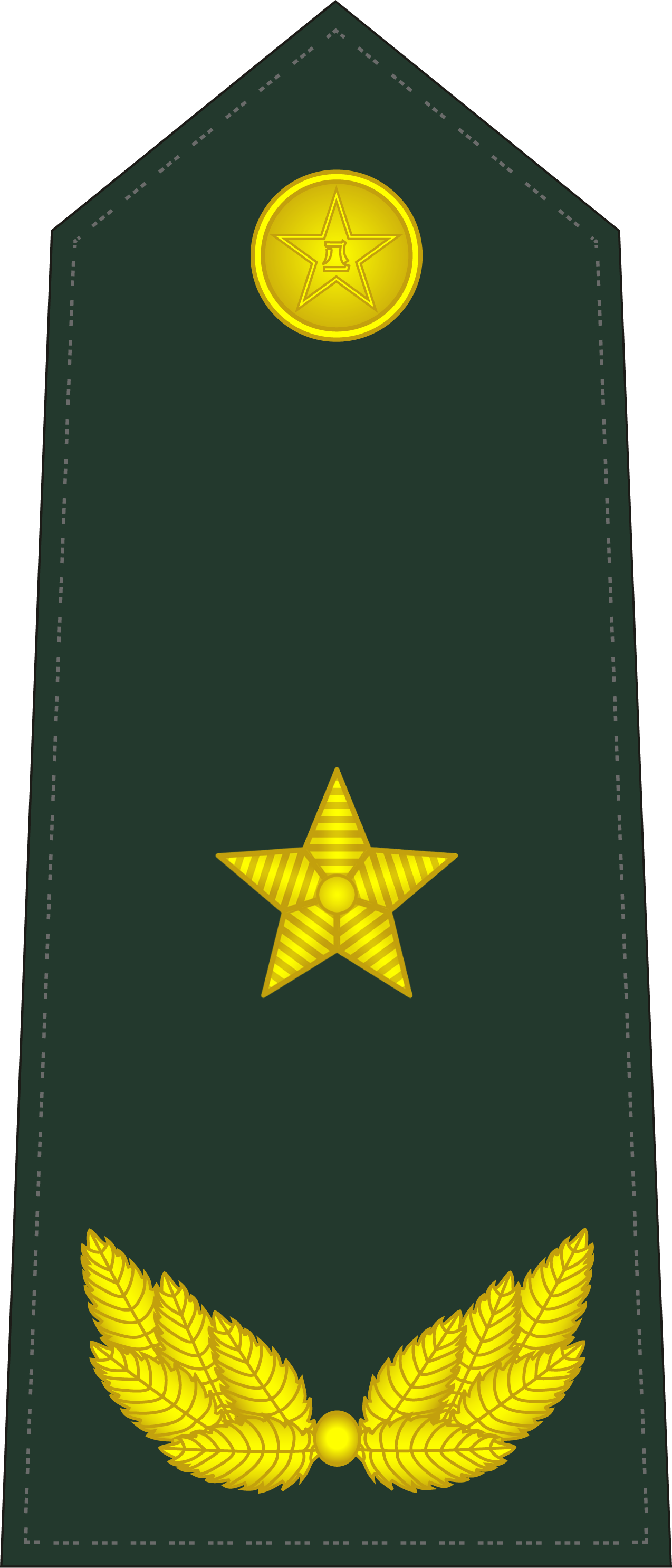
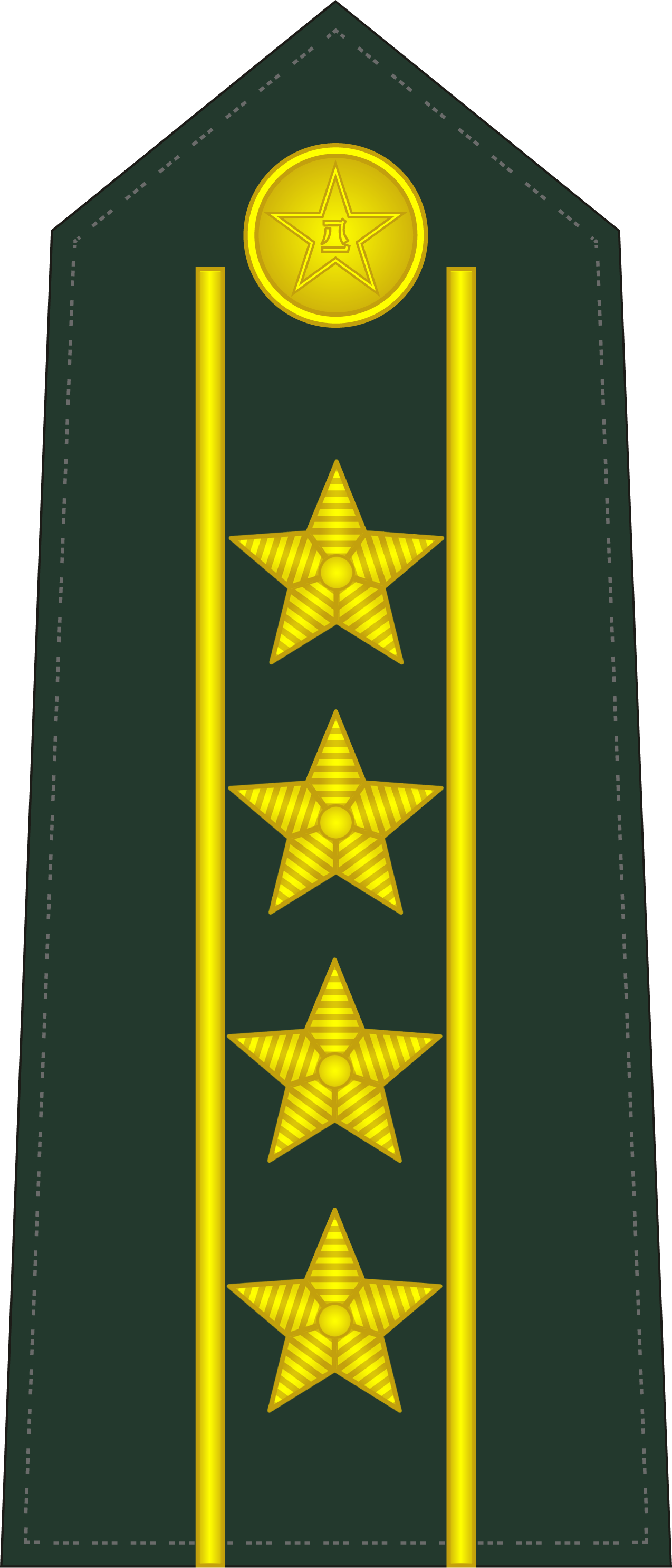
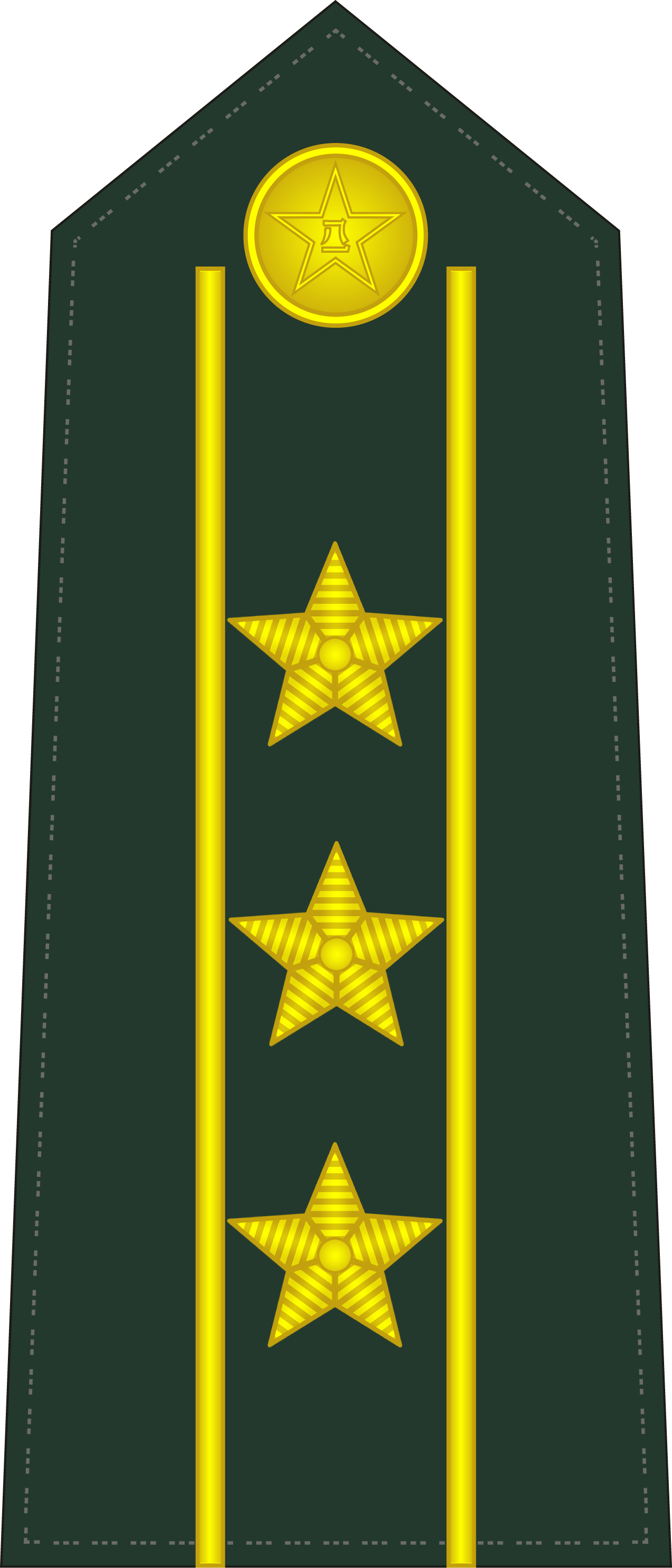
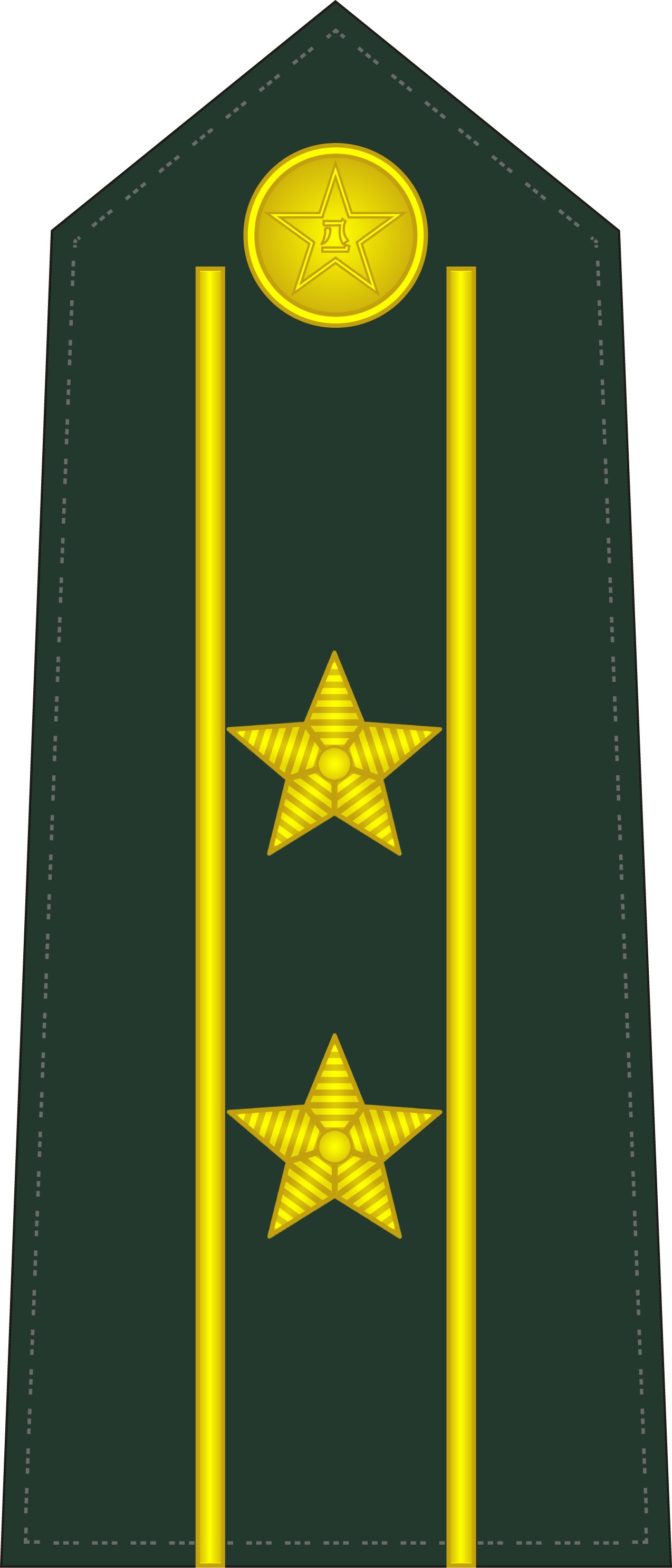
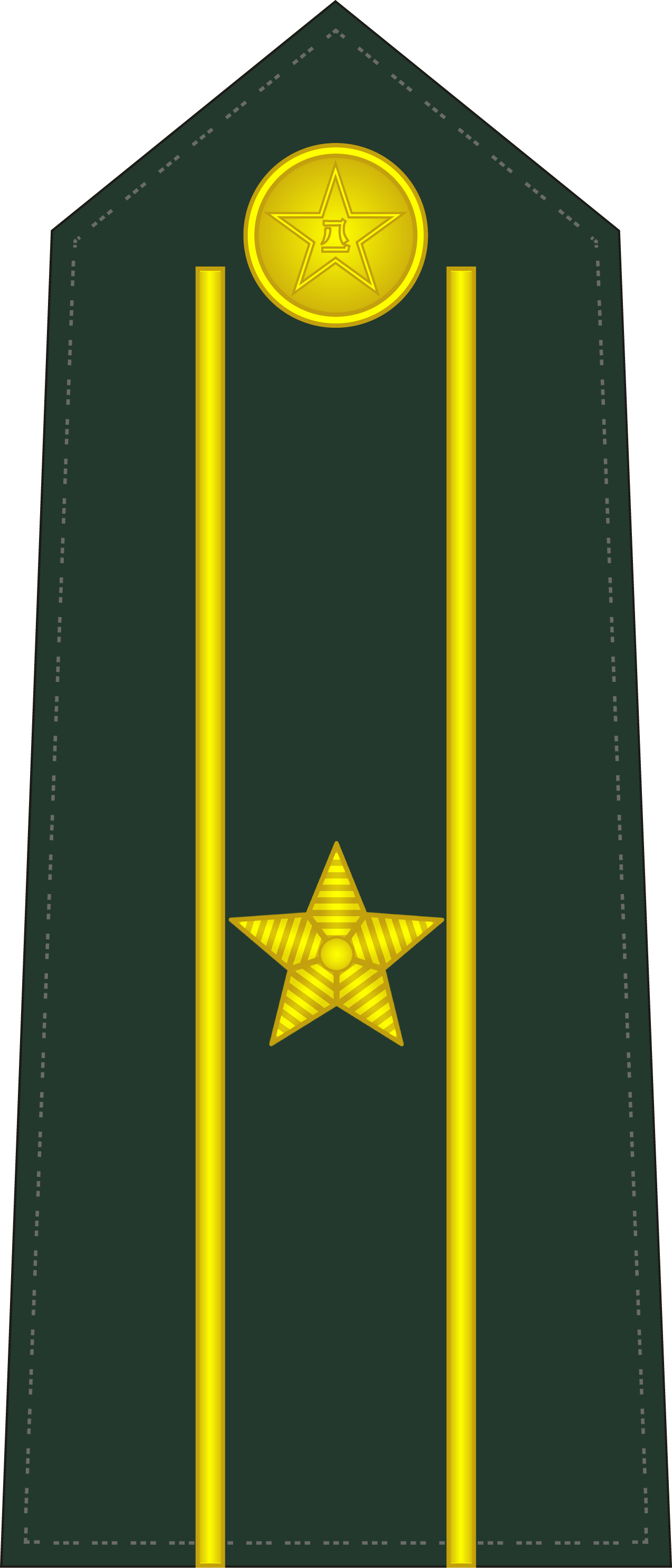
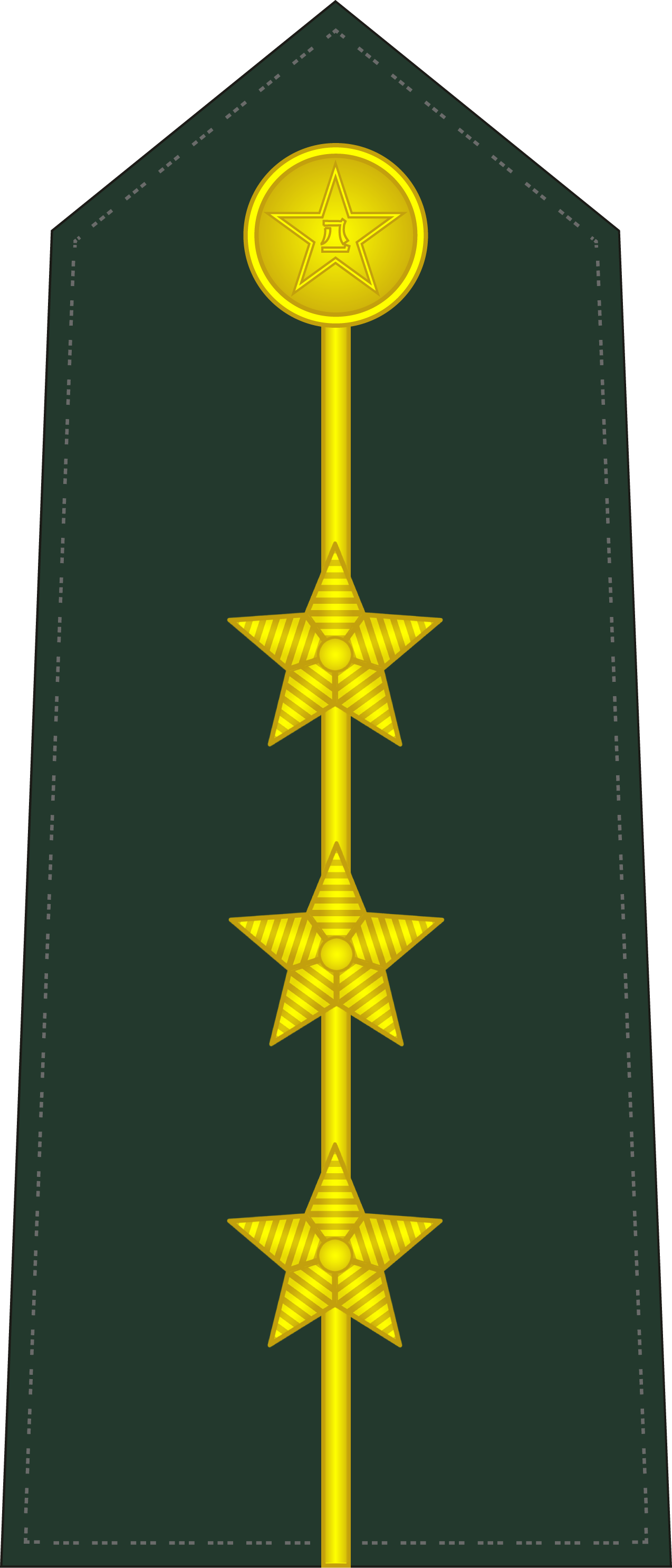
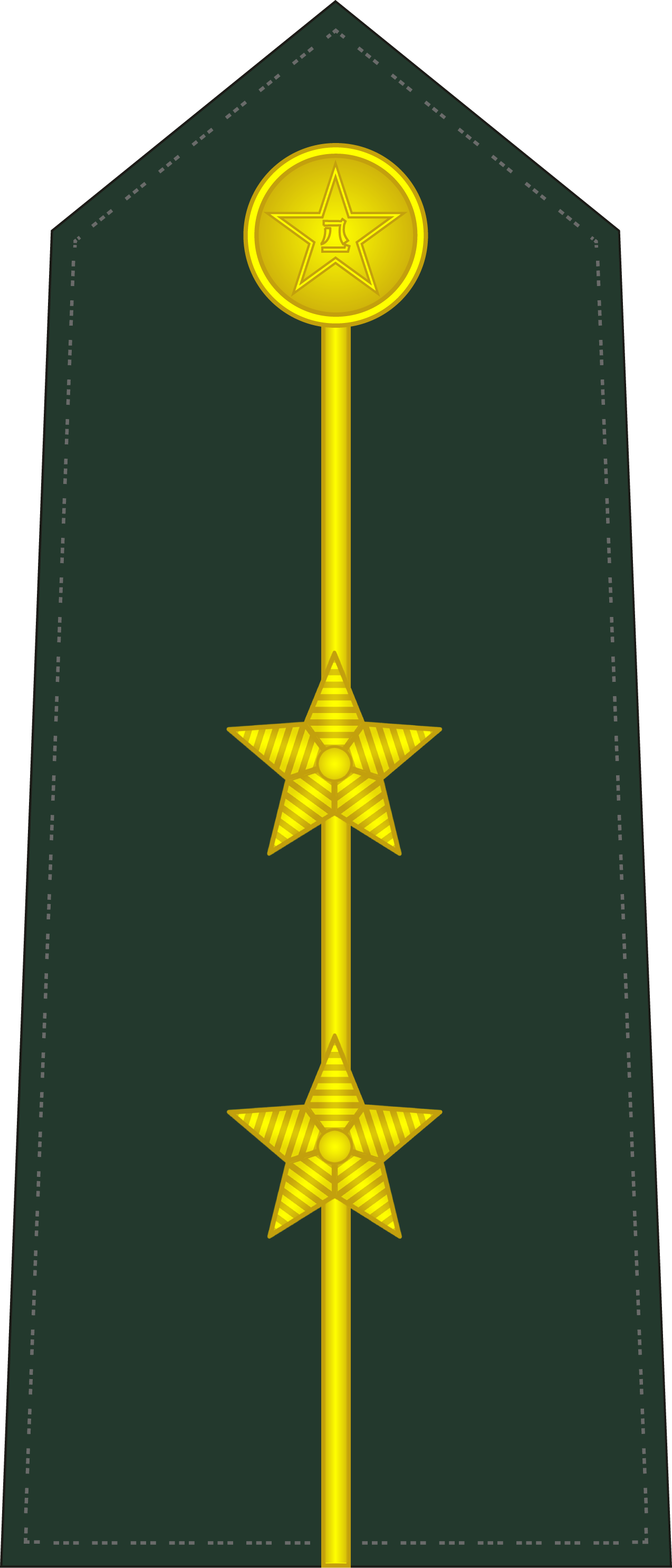
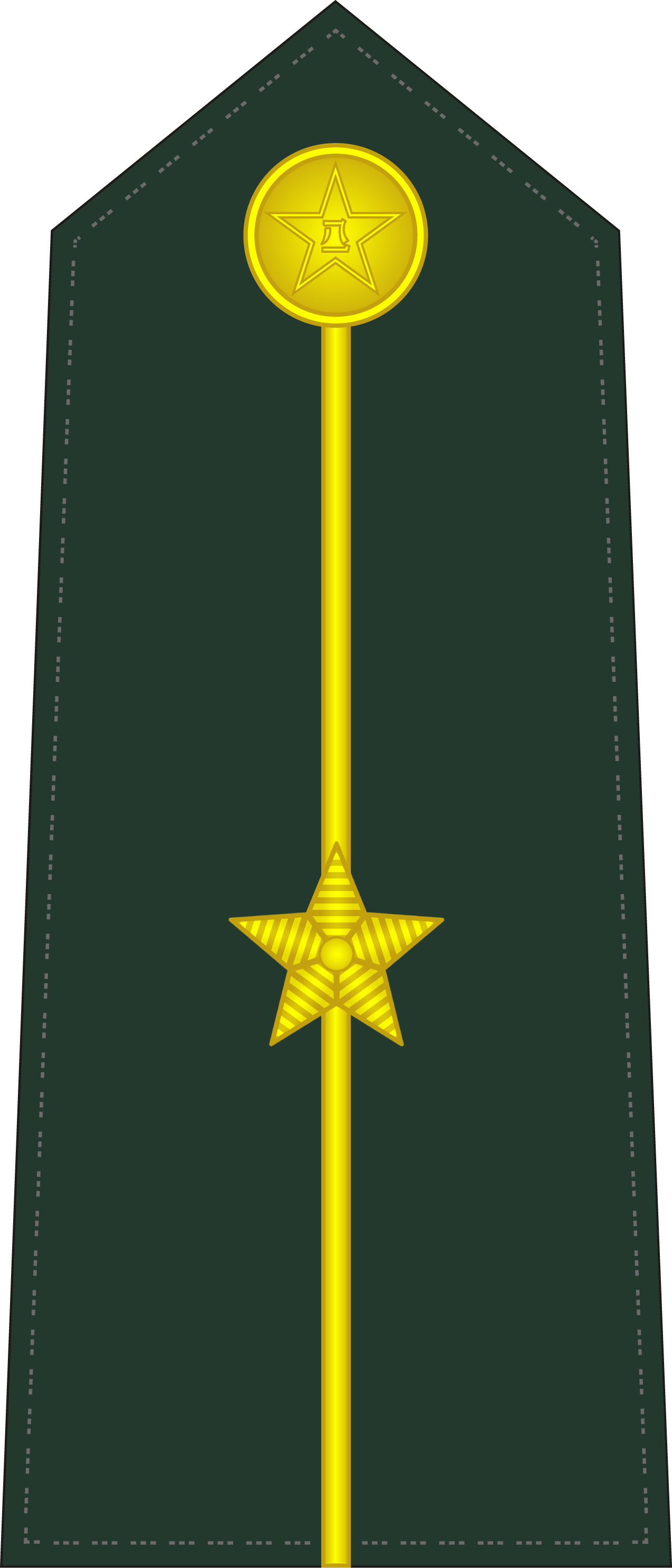
Rank group	General / flag officers			Senior officers				Junior officers
People's Armed Police
People's Armed Police	武警上将; Wǔjǐng Shàngjiàng	武警中将; Wǔjǐng Zhōngjiàng	武警少将; Wǔjǐng Shàojiàng	武警大校; Wǔjǐng Dàxiào	武警上校; Wǔjǐng Shàngxiào	武警中校; Wǔjǐng Zhōngxiào	武警少校; Wǔjǐng Shàoxiào	武警上尉; Wǔjǐng Shàngwèi	武警中尉; Wǔjǐng Zhōngwèi	武警少尉; Wǔjǐng Shàowèi

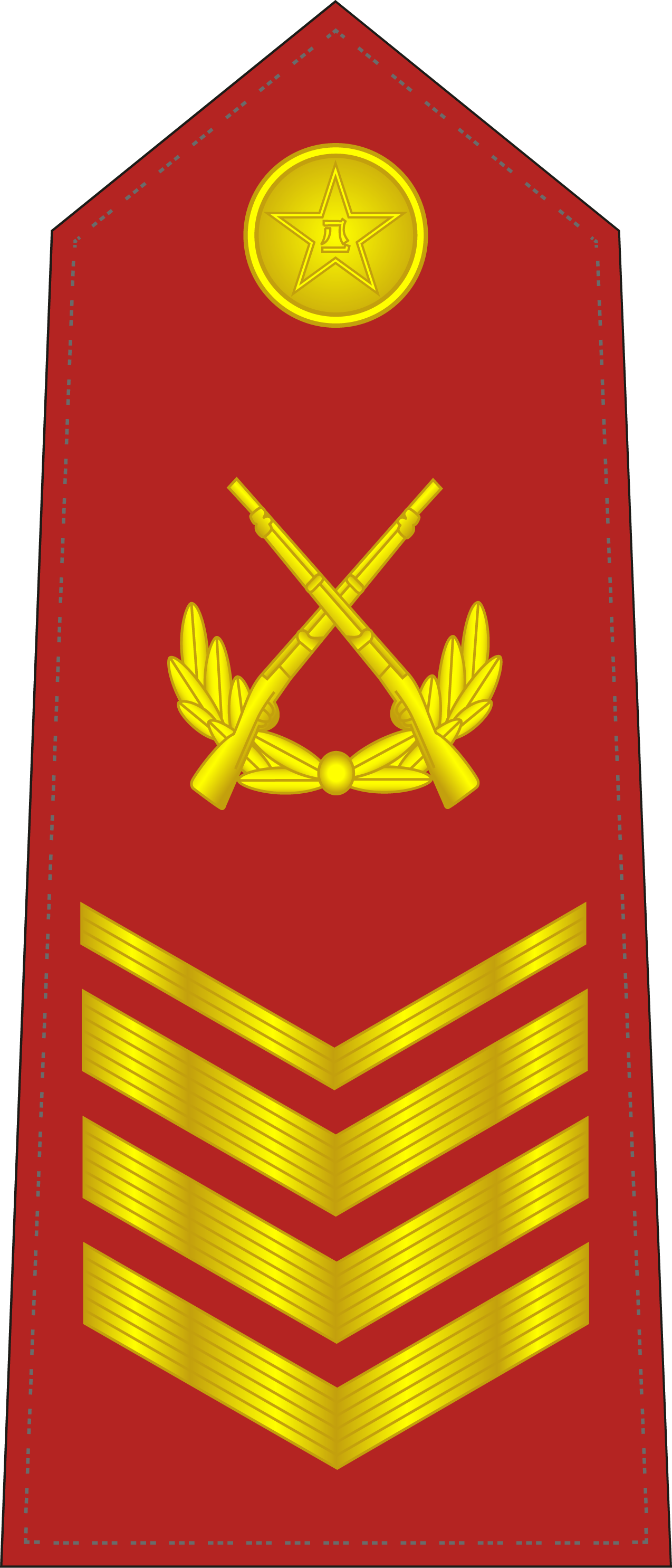
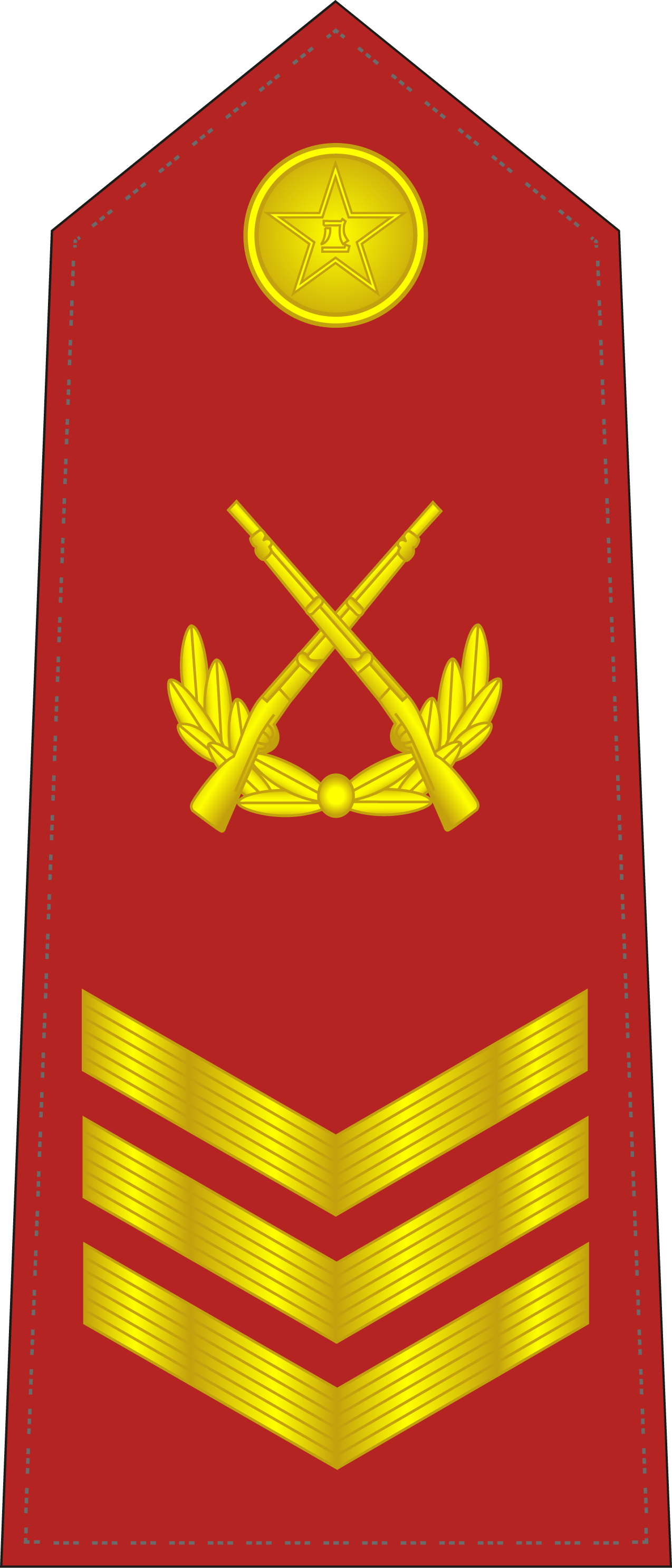
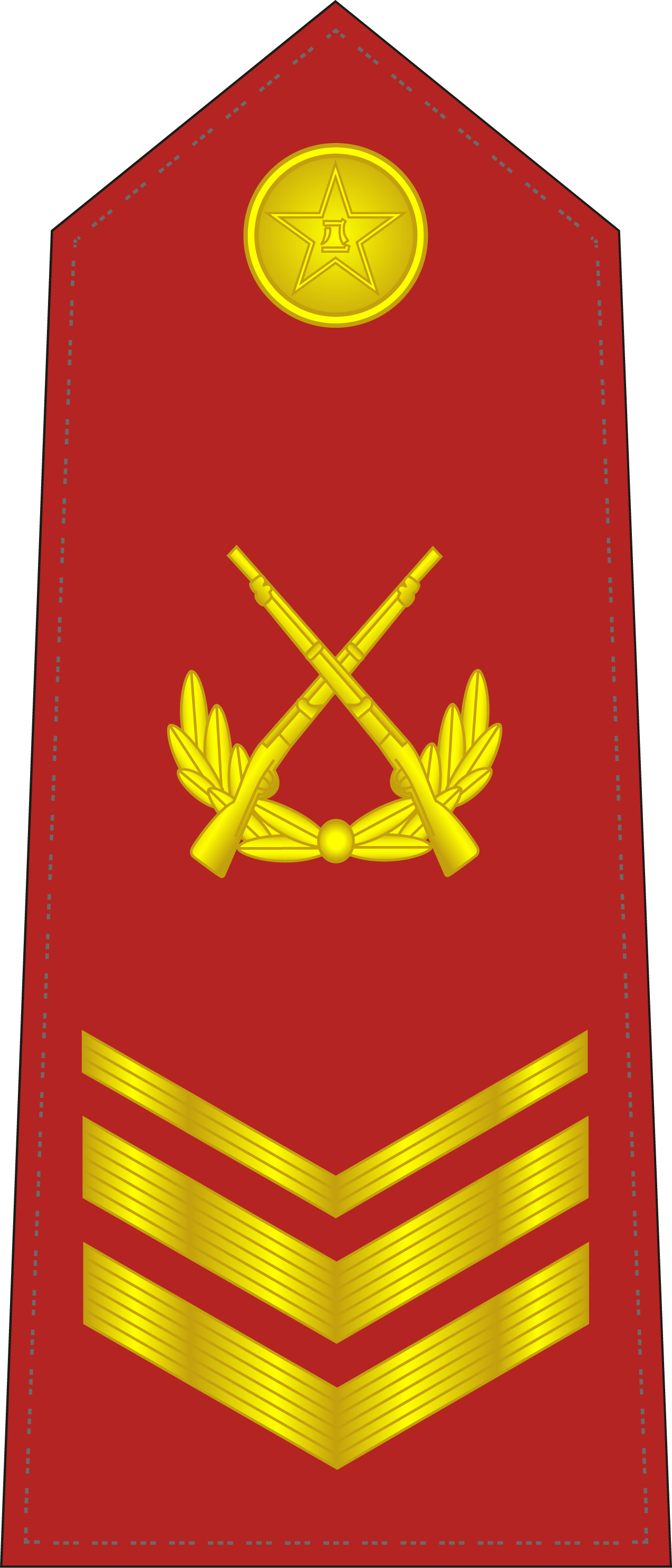
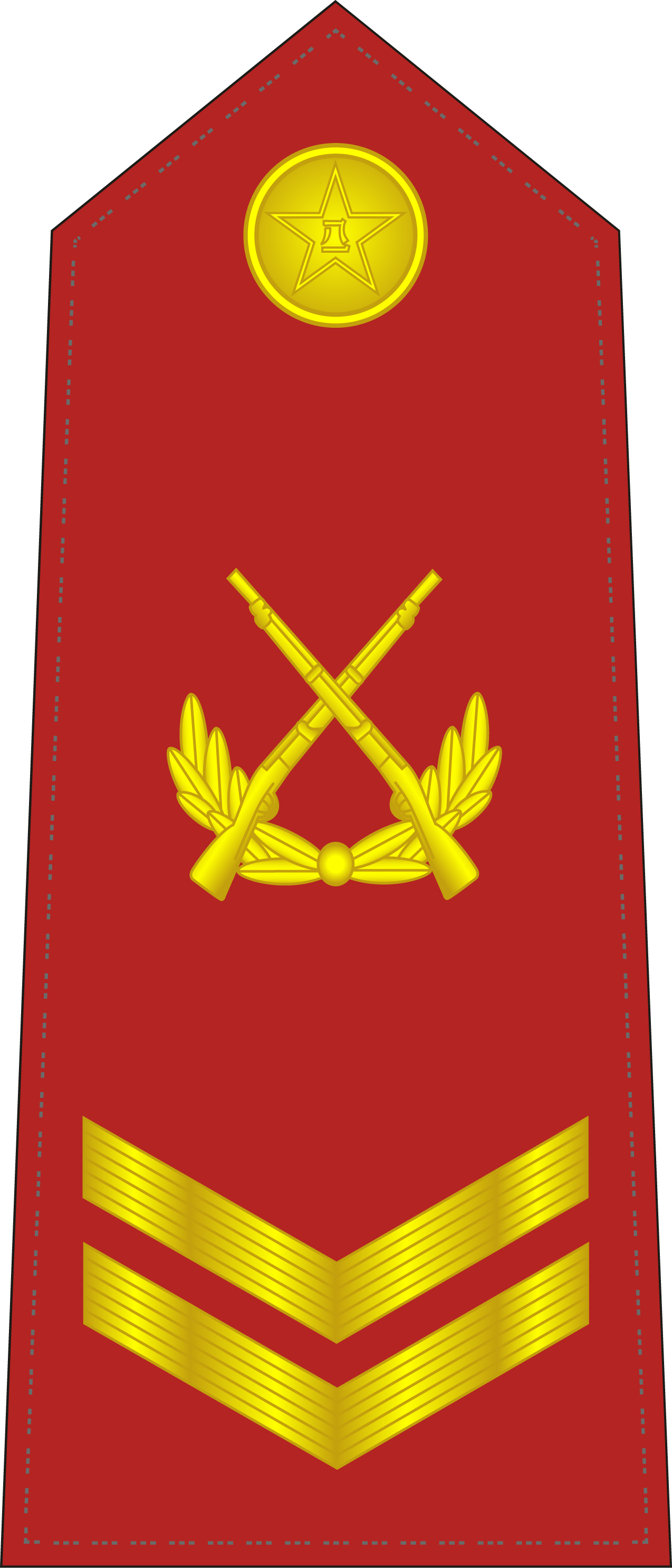
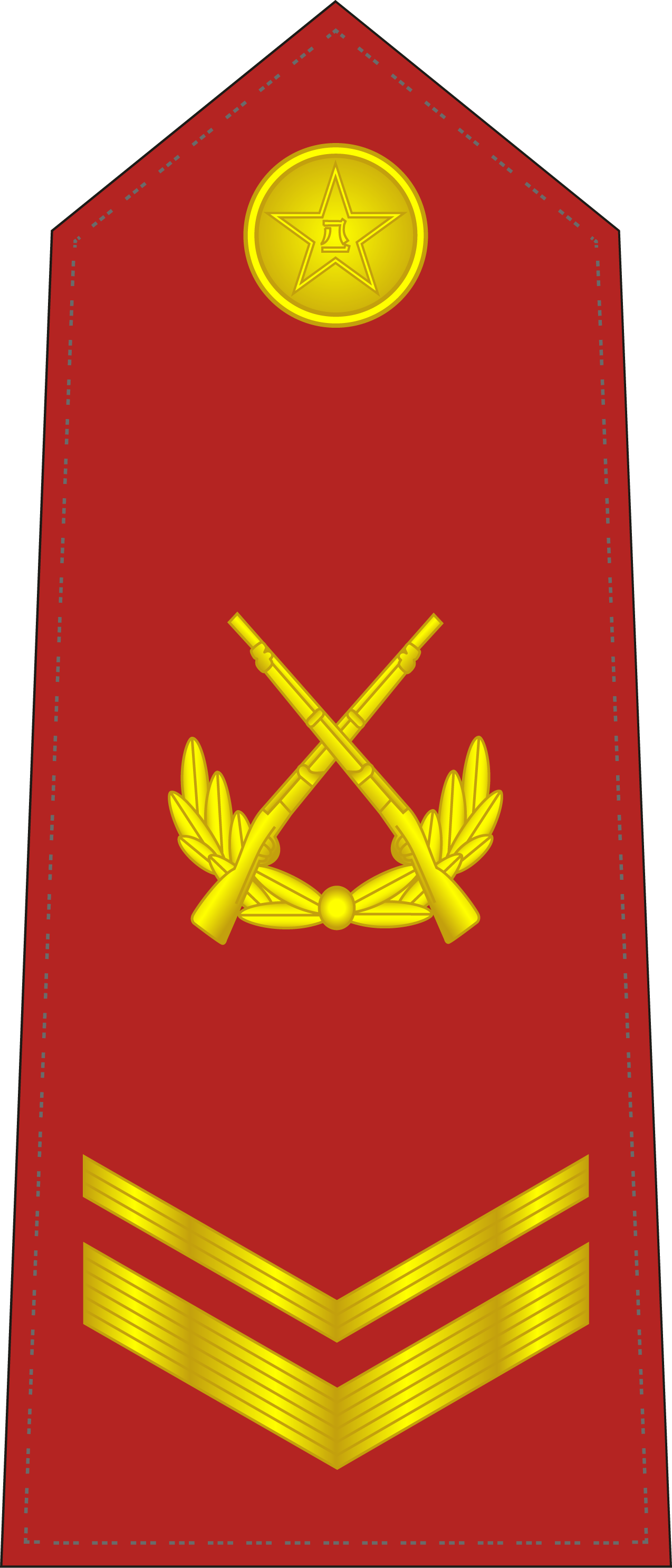
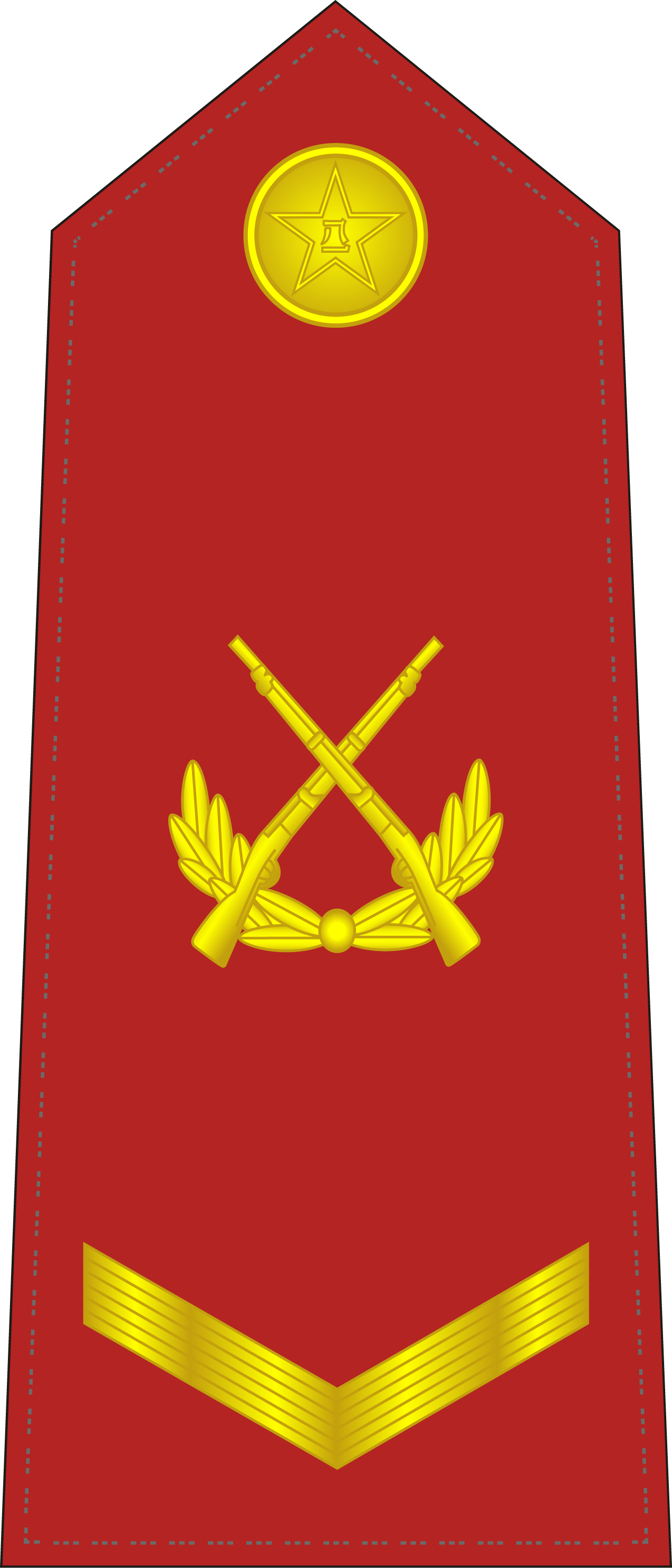
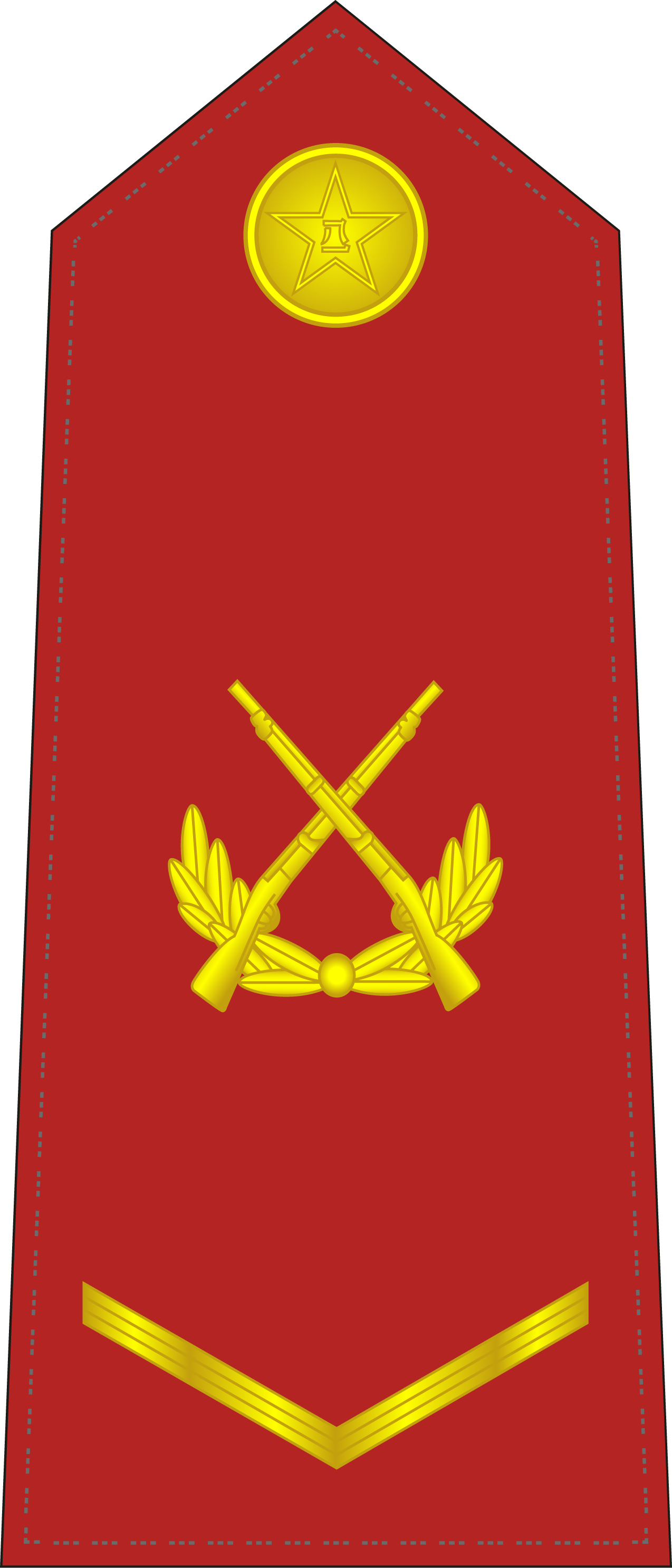
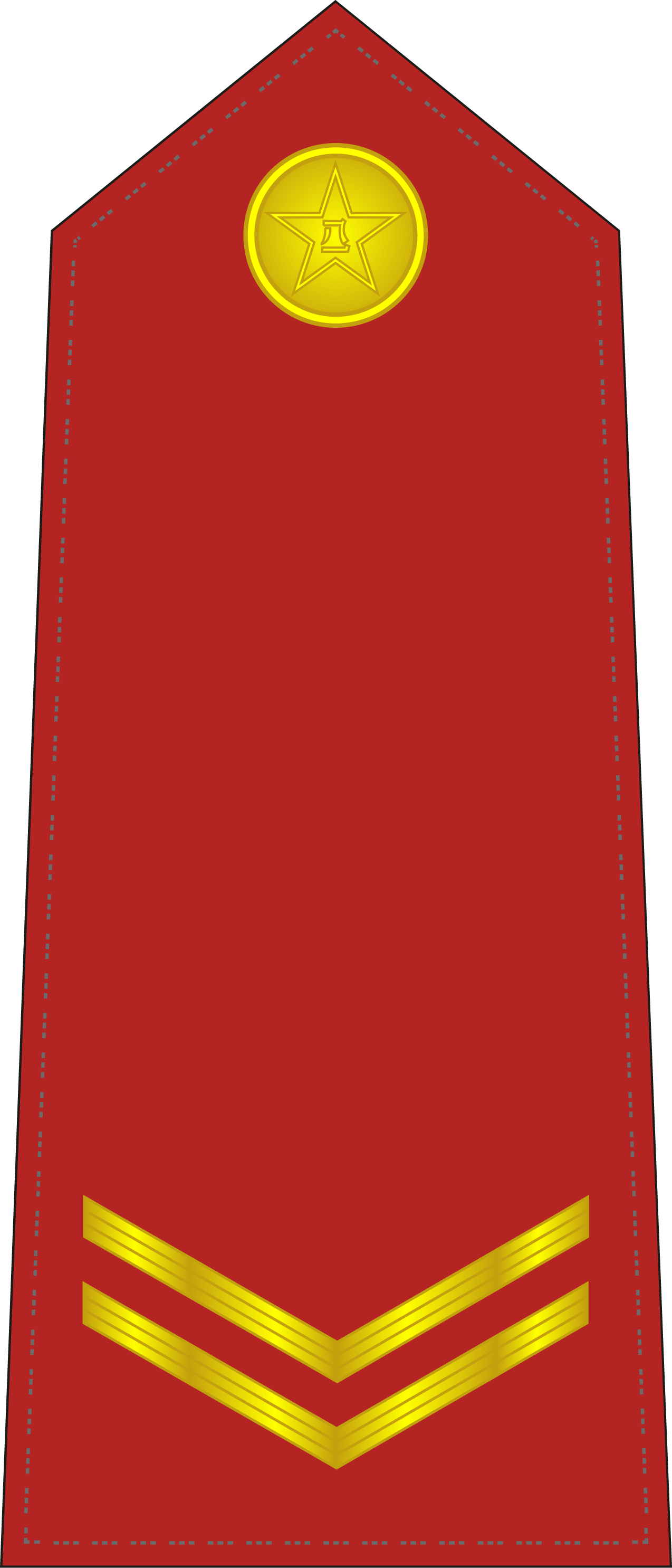
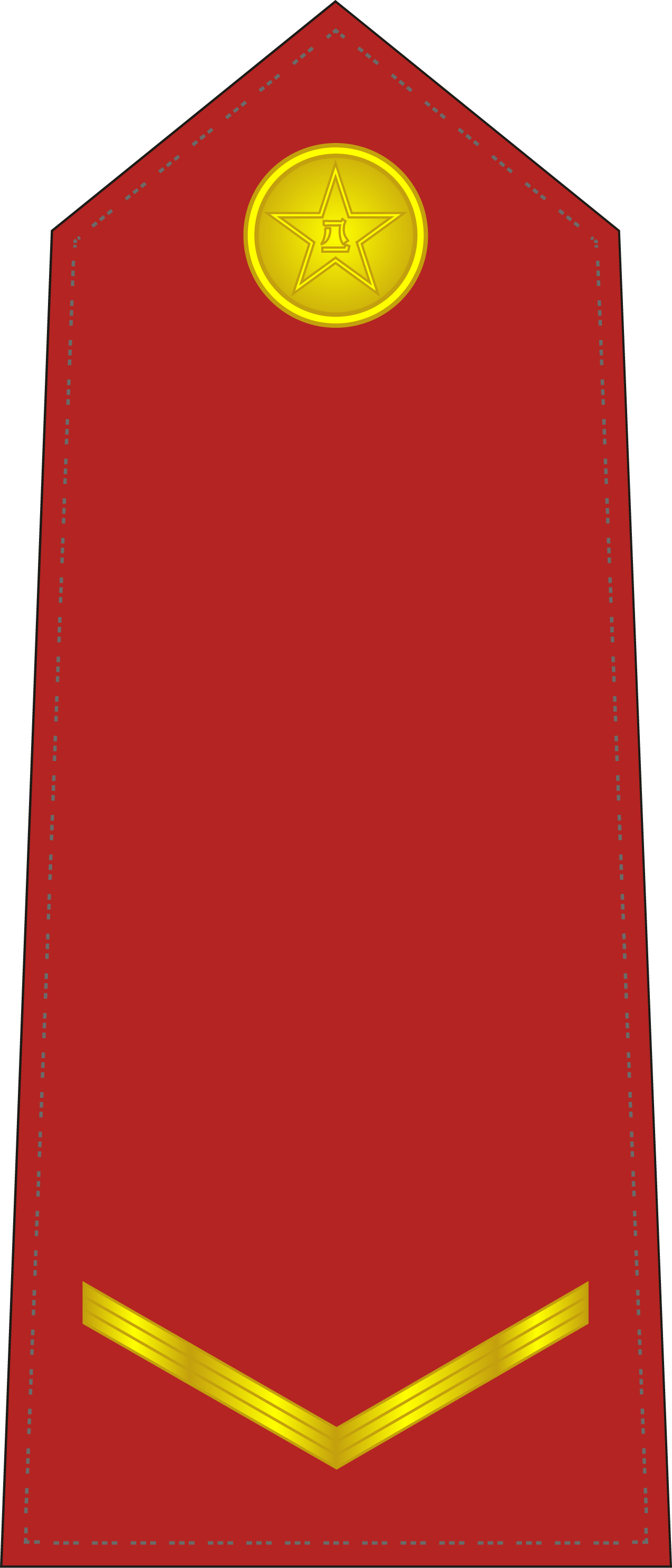
Rank group	Senior NCOs						Junior NCOs	Enlisted
People's Armed Police
People's Armed Police	武警一级警士长; Wǔjǐng Yījí jǐngshìzhǎng	武警二级警士长; Wǔjǐng Èrjí jǐngshìzhǎng	武警三级警士长; Wǔjǐng Sānjí jǐngshìzhǎng	武警四级警士长; Wǔjǐng Sìjí jǐngshìzhǎng	武警上士; Wǔjǐng Shàngshì	武警中士; Wǔjǐng Zhōngshì	武警下士; Wǔjǐng Xiàshì	武警上等兵; Wǔjǐng Shàngděngbīng	武警列兵; Wǔjǐng Lièbīng

== Cooperation with other agencies ==
The CCG has direct intel sharing with the General Administration of Customs.

=== International cooperation ===
The CCG has conducted joint patrols with the Vietnam Coast Guard.

== Bases ==
The CCG has dozens of bases and facilities up and down the coast of China, some very small, their variegated nature again the result of the Coast Guard's mixed origin. The following are some of the largest and most significant.

Major CCG Facilities
Base Name	Province	Coordinates	Notes
Beihai	Guangxi	21.485°N 109.084°E	
Fangchenggang Shiping	Guangxi	21.626°N 108.316°E	Shared with Fangchenggang Oceanic Administration, State Oceanic Administration
Qinzhou	Guangxi	21.736°N 108.639°E	
Jinzhou	Liaoning	40.846°N 121.103°E	
Fuzhou Guling	Fujian	26.055°N 119.353°E	
Fuzhou Tingjiang	Fujian	26.074°N 119.513°E	
Xiamen downtown	Fujian	24.467°N 118.065°E	
Xiamen CCG base	Fujian	24.511°N 118.065°E	
Dalian Mianhuadao	Shandong	39.006°N 121.675°E	
Dalian Wantong	Shandong	39.010°N 121.709°E	
Yantai Yangmadao	Shandong	37.444°N 121.582°E	
Yantai Zhifu Bay	Shandong	37.545°N 121.392°E	
Tianjin Dongjiang	Tianjin	38.979°N 117.802°E	
Guangzhou Taihe	Guangdong	23.109°N 113.395°E	
Huangpu Changzhou	Guangdong	23.077°N 113.432°E	
Huangpu Luntou	Guangdong	23.078°N 113.375°E	
Shantou	Guangdong	23.353°N 116.688°E	Also home to the Guangdong Fishery Department Shantou Detachment.
Zhanjiang Tiaoshun	Guangdong	21.286°N 110.409°E	
Qinhuangdao fishing wharf	Hebei	39.921°N 119.617°E	
Qinhuangdao coal terminal	Hebei	39.935°N 119.668°E	
Shanghai Fuxingdao	Shanghai	31.288°N 121.561°E	
Shanghai Gaoqiao	Shanghai	31.357°N 121.614°E	
Shanghai port facility	Shanghai	31.384°N 121.549°E	
Nantong	Jiangsu	31.908°N 120.910°E	
Haikou port	Hainan	20.031°N 110.278°E	
Haikou Haidian River	Hainan	20.0539°N 110.323°E	
Sanya	Hainan	18.233°N 109.492°E	
Wenchang	Hainan	19.560°N 110.825°E	
Qingdao Tuandao Inlet	Shandong	36.050°N 120.298°E	
Qingdao port area	Shandong	36.082°N 120.309°E	
Qingdao Huangdao	Shandong	36.005°N 120.272°E	
Zhoushan Waichangzhi	Zhejiang	29.980°N 122.082°E	
Ningbo CCG Academy	Zhejiang	29.945°N 121.710°E	
Wenzhou Lucheng	Zhejiang	28.025°N 120.672°E	

=== Coast guard air stations ===
Base name	Location	Coordinates	Stationed units
Zhoushan Putuoshan International Airport	Putuo, Zhoushan, Zhejiang	29.941667°N 122.361606°E	1st Aviation Group
Zhuhai Jinwan Airport	Jinwan, Zhuhai, Guangdong	22.010537°N 113.380464°E	2nd Aviation Group
Jinan Pingyin Agricultural airport	Pingyin county, Jinan, Shandong	36.296281°N 116.440381°E	3rd Aviation Group

== See also ==
- Coast Guard Administration (Taiwan)
- People's Armed Police
- People's Liberation Army Navy
  - People's Liberation Army Navy Coastal Defense Force
- China Maritime Safety Administration
- China Marine Surveillance
- People’s Armed Forces Maritime Militia
