= Chinese cutter Haixun 01 =

Chinese patrol ship

History

China
- Name: Haixun 01
- Operator: China Maritime Safety Administration
- Launched: 28 July 2012
- Commissioned: April 2013
- In service: 2013-present
- Home port: Shanghai
- Identification: IMO number: 9654373; MMSI number: 412379930; Callsign: BTIF
- Status: in active service

General characteristics
- Class & type: 5000 tonne class patrol and rescue/salvage ship
- Tonnage: 4,892 GT
- Displacement: 5,418 t (5,332 long tons)
- Length: 128.6 m (421 ft 11 in)
- Boats & landing craft carried: 2 × high speed boats
- Aviation facilities: helipad

Haixun 01 (Chinese: 海巡01) is a Chinese 5000 tonne-class cutter (Note: The U.S. Navy classifies the Haixun 01 as a SHUOSHI I-Class WPS) (NATO: Shuoshi class cutter), with a length of 128.6 meters (421 ft 11 in) and a displacement of 5,418 tons. She is part of the Shanghai MSA.

== History ==
The ship was launched 28 July 2012, and handed over to the China Maritime Safety Administration in late April 2013. In January 2013, China ordered the build of four extra identical ships to Haixun 01.

== Design ==
The home port of the ship is Shanghai. According to the head of the Shanghai Maritime Bureau, which will manage the ship, it is the first Chinese patrol ship to simultaneously incorporate marine inspection and rescue functions. It carries out missions regarding both maritime inspection, safety monitoring, rescue, oil spill detection and handling. The ship also has a helipad.

== Operations ==
In March 2014, Haixun 01 was sent to participate in the search for the missing Malaysia Airlines Flight 370, off the west coast of Australia. In May 2024, the ship took part in a search and rescue drill in waters off Kinmen.
