= China Rescue and Salvage Bureau =

Ministry of Transportation Rescue and Salvage Bureau
- 交通运输部救助打捞局
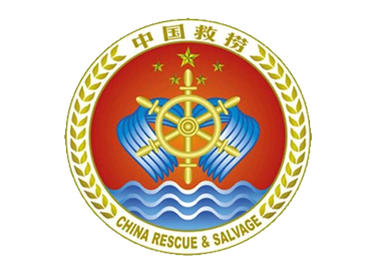

The Ministry of Transport Rescue and Salvage Bureau of the People's Republic of China (中华人民共和国交通运输部救助打捞局) (short form, China Rescue and Salvage) is an institution directly under the Ministry of Transport of the People's Republic of China. It is the most important maritime rescue and salvage organization in China, and the only one that operates at national level. It is based in Beijing. As of 2022, it had 10,000 employees, 80% of whom were professional technical personnel, divers, and crew, manning 191 vessels (76 specialist rescue vessels, and 132 specialist salvage vessels), 20 rescue aircraft and 21 specialist rescue teams.

CRS has gained a good international reputation for its willingness and ability to operate in extreme bad sea conditions, receiving a number of international prizes. The CRS also engages in commercial salvage work, and other forms of marine engineering.

== History ==
The origin of China Rescue and Salvage are in a series of local institutions based in Shanghai. In 1951, with the approval of the Central People's Government, the Central Ministry of Communications decided to merge the Maritime (Salvage) Department of the State-owned Maritime Transport Bureau with the nationalized Huaxing Salvage Company. On 24 August 1951, a new state-owned enterprise, the Chinese People's Salvage Company was established in Shanghai, responsible for navigation and salvage at the Huangpu River and Yangtze River estuaries. The company had to deal with 59 shipwrecks at the bottom of the Huangpu River that had sunk from the end of 1948 to the beginning of 1949 (during the Chinese Civil War), and with hundreds of shipwrecks in the Yangtze River estuary channel, by sealing holed hulls and pumping water, mud removal, barge lifting, shipwreck removal, and channel dredging. The company had 120 employees, including 6 members of the Chinese Communist Party.

On 4 November 1952, Chen Yun, director of the Financial and Economic Committee of the Central People's Government Administration Council, issued Public License No. 243 to the China People's Salvage Company. At that time, the company had only one 125-kilowatt tug (the Panshan—盘山号) and more than ten small barges. In four years, the company managed to remove 104 wrecks of around 100,000 tons total displacement, mostly from the Huangpu and Yangtze delta. From 12 February 1953, the Chinese People's Salvage Company used the name "Salvage Company of the General Administration of Navigation Engineering". Zhang Zhikui served as the manager from August 1953 until January 1966. From 1 January 1956, the company's name changed to "Salvage Engineering Bureau of the General Administration of Navigation Engineering", still with the nature of a business institution. On 1 July 1958, it was renamed Shanghai Salvage Engineering Bureau.

On 23 July 1958, the then Minister of Transportation Wang Shoudao ordered the merging of maritime rescue with salvage operations. From 16 September 1958, shipwrecks in the coastal waters of China from Wenzhou to the mouth of the Yalu River were placed under the responsibility of the Shanghai Salvage Engineering Bureau, making the SSEB into the first national-level combined rescue and salvage organization. The SSEB first set up three rescue stations at Yantai, Shanghai, and Wenzhou. On 15 February 1963, the Shanghai Salvage Engineering Bureau was renamed the Shanghai Maritime Rescue and Salvage Bureau. In December 1963, the Ministry of Communications set up the Yantai Rescue Station and the Tianjin Rescue Station as detached units. By the first half of 1964, five rescue stations had been built in Tianjin, Yantai, Shanghai, Wenzhou, and Xiamen. A major inciting incident for the development of Chinese maritime rescue occurred on 9 October 1973, when the Greek freighter Baltic Klif sank outside of Fujian province during Typhoon Nora without effective response by the Chinese authorities of the port of Xiamen, which made Zhou Enlai complain about the "cowardice" of the slow reaction. This extremely sharp rebuke (in the middle of the Cultural Revolution, when such rebukes tended to have dangerous outcomes) caused a drive to strengthen coastal rescue networks across the country.

As a reaction, in 1973 the State Council and the Central Military Commission jointly issued a document to establish the National Maritime Security Command. In 1974, a national maritime search and rescue work conference was held in Qingdao. The meeting decided that the Ministry of Transport would establish two new maritime security headquarters in Yantai and Guangzhou. The Guangzhou Maritime Rescue and Salvage Bureau (the former Third Engineering Team of China People's Salvage Company) was created that same year, and on 28 September 1974, the Yantai Shipwreck Rescue and Salvage Bureau of the Ministry of Transport was officially established. On 30 April 1975, the Tianjin and Yantai rescue stations were formally transferred to the Yantai Salvage Bureau, and 308 employees, 3 tugboats, 3 salvage barges, 20 salvage buoys, and total assets of 130,000 yuan were transferred with them.

The three new Salvage Bureaus started building 9 rescue stations, built rescue docks, radio stations, and recruited People's Liberation Army Navy veterans to expand their force. The bureaus also started to add high-horsepower, specialized rescue tugs. In 1975, China bought from Japan its first purpose-built deep-sea rescue tug, the Hujiu 101 (沪救101号, literally Shanghai Rescue 101), a 87 m (285 ft 5 in) long, 14 m (45 ft 11 in) beam, and 2,100 tons displacement vessel. Soon after, with the start of the reform and opening, the bureaus were also progressively allowed to operate commercially, the Shanghai bureau under the name "Shanghai Tug Company". With the rapid growth of marine traffic as China foreign trade grew, the opportunities for profitable activities became common, and as the Bureaus were allowed to retain earnings for reinvestment, they grew steadily in equipment and capabilities.

As part of the generalized reform for the commercialization of SOEs, on 28 February 2003, the Ministry of Communications, the National Development and Reform Commission, and six other ministries and commissions jointly issued the "Notice on Issuing the Implementation Plan for the Salvage and Rescue System Reform" (Jiao Ren Lao Fa [2003] No. 60), formally implementing a wide reform of the salvage and rescue system. Starting on 1 April 2003, the Ministry of Transport implemented this reform, separating rescue from salvage. The three salvage bureaus allocated assets to three new Maritime Rescue Bureaus, in the Beihai (Northern Seas—Yellow and Bohai seas), Donghai (East China Sea), and Nanhai (South China Sea), co-located but separate from the three salvage bureaus in Yantai, Shanghai, and Guangzhou. Four rescue aviation squadrons were also raised.

The logic of the reform was that while rescue duties are part of the peremptory public service of protecting life, ship salvage is not as time sensitive and, when not involving urgent seaway clearance, can be made into a commercial activity. After the split, the salvage bureaus would some carry out some emergency duties such as disaster relief and urgent salvage operations, while also engage in commercial salvage of sunken ships and sunken objects in public waterways; port debris clearance; rescue and salvage of distressed ships where there is no risk to life; emergency emptying of bunker from sunken ships, and containment of oil spills from distressed ships; and prevention of environmental pollution resulting from marine accidents. It was expected they would use their profits to fund equipment and preparation for both the salvage and the rescue units.

The new six bureaus were put under the vertical leadership of the Rescue and Salvage Bureau of the Ministry of Transport, which coordinates their activities, although all six subordinate bureaus operate autonomously. The CSR in its various incarnations has, in the period between 24 August 1951 to 23 August 2021, rescued a total of 82,783 people (12,703 foreigners) and 5,424 ships in distress (957 foreign ships) in harsh sea conditions and other emergency and dangerous environments, and salvaged 1,827 sunken ships (99 foreign ships). Since the 2003 reform, the Guangzhou Bureaus have carried out a total of 423 salvage missions, rescued 129 ships, and rescued property worth RMB 7.08 billion; salvaged 59 sunken ships, recovered 185 bodies of victims, and rescued 1,133 people; the Shanghai bureaus; and the Yantai bureaus have carried out 512 salvage missions, rescued 3,163 people, salvaged 183 sunken ships, and recovered 5,000 tons of spilled oil.

== Functions ==
China Rescue and Salvage is by law responsible for emergency response to maritime emergencies in Chinese waters, including life saving operations, ship and property rescue, shipwreck and sunken object salvage, maritime firefighting, cleanup of oil spills, and other public welfare responsibilities such as providing safety guarantee for maritime transportation and offshore resource developments. Its Chinese motto is "three rescues and one salvage" (i.e. human life rescue, environmental rescue, property rescue, and emergency salvage).

The CRS has some policy-making obligations as well, preparing the five-year-plans for the national salvage system, and some administrative duties such as coordinating maritime air patrols, and taking command and coordination roles of major rescue and salvage operations. It also has the duty to fulfill some of China's international obligations (such as some China's SOLAS obligations). The CRS must also collect the data and statistics related to rescue operations and salvage in China, (Note: The ultimate legal obligation of guaranteeing life and traffic safety in Chinese waters falls on the CMSA and its subordinate Maritime Search and Rescue Center, the CRS is the "specialist" rescue agency, the most active and well-equipped of the various maritime agencies and salvage companies in the country, and must legally "take point" in rescue and salvage operations, but both the CMSA and the China Coast Guard ships have rescue obligations as well.) CRS cooperates very closely with the China Maritime Safety Administration's Maritime Search and Rescue Center (中国海上搜救中心), which is the main maritime SAR coordinator in China, and with other emergency control centers in the country.

The various subordinate units of the CRS operate as commercial businesses as well, in particular the Shanghai Salvage Bureau, which with the name of China Offshore Engineering Solutions (COES) operates several national international subsidiaries, carrying out both salvage (such as the difficult lifting of the wreck of the ferry Sewol in one piece) and other marine engineering operations (such as long-distance towing the aircraft carrier Kiev, caisson and immersed tunnel placement, and even underwater archeology.) The other salvage bureaus also operate underwater engineering, land reclamation, ship repair, shipbuilding, and harbor engineering companies.

== Organization ==
=== Internal units ===
1. General Office (办公室): General management, confidentiality and international affairs.
2. Planning, Construction, and Science and Technology Office (规划建设科技处): Responsible for equipment acquisition, compliance with industry standards, statistics and information work.
3. Finance Office (财务处) Budget management.
4. Personnel and Education Office (人事e 处) Personnel education and training, technical cadre management. Certification of divers and other specialists.
5. Rescue Management Office (救助管理处): coordinate the on-call rescue forces, life, environmental, and military rescue duties. Responsible for units readiness.
6. Aviation Management Office (飞行管理处) Responsible for the leadership and management of the maritime rescue flight teams of the Rescue and Salvage Bureau of the Ministry of Transport; responsible for the team building and air and ground safety management of the maritime rescue flight team; responsible for the command, dispatch and coordination of maritime rescue flights.
7. Salvage Management Office (打捞管理处): Responsible for salvage business management, manage the affiliated salvage companies.
8. Safety Supervision and Management Office (安全监督管理处): Responsible for the comprehensive safety management and accident handling of the entire salvage system.
9. Audit Office (审计处): Auditing and asset management.
10. Party and Mass Work Office (Organization Office) 党群工作处（组织处）Party work, organization and management of cadres, and publicity.
11. Office of the Discipline Inspection Commission (纪委办公室) Supervision and discipline.

=== Subordinate units ===
As of 2021, the CRS had a total of 24 rescue bases, 88 rescue ship standby points (coastal and at sea), 10 rescue flight airbases, and 115 temporary take-off/landing points (for helicopters) spread in the coastline between the Yalu River in the north to the South China Sea Islands in the south. Its subordinate units are as follows:

==== Rescue Bureaus ====
- MOT Beihai Rescue Bureau (交通运输部北海救助局) - Yantai
  - Dalian Base (大连基地)
  - Qinhuangdao Base (秦皇岛基地)
  - Tianjin Base (天津基地)
  - Yantai Base (烟台基地)
  - Rongcheng Base (荣成基地)
  - Nanhuangcheng Base (南隍城基地)
  - Beihai Rescue Fleet (北海救助船队)
  - Beihai Rescue Support Center (北海救助保障中心)
- MOT Donghai Rescue Bureau (交通运输部东海救助局) - Shanghai
  - Liangyungang Base (连云港基地)
  - Shanghai Base (上海基地)
  - Zhoushan Base (舟山基地)
  - Ningbo Base (宁波基地)
  - Wenzhou Base (温州基地)
  - Fuzhou Base (福州基地)
  - Xiamen Base (厦门基地)
  - Donghai Rescue Flotilla (东海救助船队)
  - Donghai Rescue Support Center (东海救助保障中心)
- MOT Nanhai Rescue Bureau (交通运输部南海救助局) - Guangzhou
  - Shantou Base (汕头基地)
  - Guangzhou Base (广州基地)
  - Shenzhen Base (深圳基地)
  - Yangjiang Base (阳江基地)
  - Zhanjiang Base (湛江基地)
  - Haikou Base (海口基地)
  - Beihai Base (北海基地)
  - Xisha Base (西沙基地)
  - Sanya Base (三亚基地)
  - Nanhai Rescue Flotilla (南海救助船队)
  - Nanhai Rescue Support Center (南海救助保障中心)

==== Salvage Bureaus: italics indicate a subsidiary company ====
- MOT Yantai Salvage Bureau (交通运输部烟台打捞局). Operates 3 salvage flotillas, and 7 subordinate work units.
  - YSB Rescue, Salvage & Engineering Flotilla (烟台打捞局救捞工程船队)
  - YSB Rescue & Salvage Tugs Flotilla (烟台打捞局救捞拖轮船队)
  - YSB Ocean Engineering Flotilla (烟台打捞海洋工程船队)
  - YSB Ship Repair and Ship Building Center (烟台打捞局船舶修造中心)
  - YSB Salvage Engineering Development Center (烟台打捞局打捞技术开发中心)
  - YSB Salvage Service Development Center (烟台打捞局打捞业务开发中心)
  - YSB Harbor Services and Management Center (烟台打捞局港务管理中心)
  - YSB Ship Repair & Ship Building Center (烟台打捞局船舶修造中心)
  - YSB Financial Settlement Center (烟台打捞局财务结算中心)
  - YSB Salvage Support Center (烟台打捞局打捞保障中心)
  - Yantai Seamen Secondary Vocational School (烟台海员职业中等专业学校)
- MOT Donghai Rescue Bureau (交通运输部上海打捞局). Operates 3 salvage flotillas, 7 subordinate work units, and 8 subsidiary companies
  - SSB Search, Salvage & Engineering Flotilla (上海打捞局救捞工程船队)
  - SSB Rescue & Salvage Tug Flotilla (上海打捞局救捞拖轮船队)
  - SSB AHTS Flotilla (上海打捞局三用船船队)
  - SSB Rescue & Salvage Technology Development Center (上海打捞局打捞技术开发中心)
  - SSB Salvage Service Development Center (上海打捞局打捞业务开发中心)
  - MOT China Rescue and Salvage Bureau Wuhu Rescue and Salvage Equipment R&D Center (交通运输部救助打捞局芜湖救捞装备研发中心)
  - Shanghai Rescue & Salvage Equipment Production Research & Development Center (上海救捞装备研发制造中心)
  - SSB Financial Settlement Center (上海打捞局财务结算中心)
  - SSB Deep Ocean Construction Engineering R&D Center (上海打捞局深海工程技术研发中心)
  - SSB Rescue & Salvage Support Center (上海打捞局打捞保障中心)
  - Shanghai Diving Equipment Factory Ltd. Co. (上海潜水装备厂有限公司)
  - SSB Wuhu Diving Equipment Factory Ltd. Co. (上海打捞局芜湖潜水装备厂有限公司)
  - China Ocean Engineering Shanghai Ltd. Co. (中国海洋工程上海有限公司)
  - China Ocean Engineering Solutions Ltd. Co. (中国海洋工程有限公司)
  - COES Zhonghaichang Ship Services Ltd. Co. (中海昌船务有限公司)
  - COES Caledonia UK Ltd. Co.
  - COES Saudi Arabia Offshore Ltd. Co.
  - COES Holdings Malaysia Sdn. Bhd.
- MOT Guangzhou Salvage Bureau (交通运输部广州打捞局). Operates 2 salvage flotillas, 7 subordinate work units, and 8 subsidiary companies
  - GSB Rescue & Salvage Engineering Flotilla (广州打捞局救捞工程船队)
  - GSB Salvage Tugboat Flotilla (广州打捞局救捞拖轮船队)
  - GSB Ship Repair and Ship Building Center (广州打捞局船舶修造中心)
  - GSB Harbor Engineering Co. Ltd. (广州打捞局港航工程中心)
  - Oceanic Engineering Center (广州打捞局海洋工程中心)
  - GSB Salvage Service Development Center (广州打捞局打捞业务开发中心)
  - GSB Salvage Engineering Development Center (打捞技术开发中心)
  - Friendly Benefit Engineering Ltd. Co. (友利工程有限公司)
  - Guangzhou Diving School (广州潜水学校)
  - GSB Zhuhai Engineering Ltd. Co. (广州打捞局珠海工程有限公司)
  - GSB Guangzhou (Wanning) Engineering Ltd. Co. (广州打捞局广州(万宁)工程有限公司)
  - GSB Engineering & Construction Ltd. Co. (广州打捞局工程建设有限公司)
  - GSB Yangjiang Windpower Engineering Ltd. Co. (广州打捞局阳江风电工程有限公司)
  - GSB Jiangmen Ltd. Co. (广州打捞局江门有限公司)
  - Guangzhou Conghua Huguang Diving Engineering Ltd. Co. (广州从化湖光潜水技术有限公司)
  - China Ocean Engineering Guangzhou Ltd. Co. (中国海洋工程广州有限公司)
  - Guangxi GSB Engineering & Construction Ltd. Co. (广西广捞工程建设有限公司)

==== Air Service ====
- Beihai No. 1 Rescue Flying Service (交通运输部北海第一飞行队): Yantai; subordinate to the Beihai Rescue Bureau
- Donghai No. 1 Rescue Flying Service (交通运输部东海第一飞行队): Shanghai Pudong
- Donghai No. 2 Rescue Flying Service (交通运输部东海第二飞行队): Xiamen
- Nanhai No. 1 Rescue Flying Service (交通运输部南海第一飞行队): Guangzhou

== Equipment ==
=== Rescue Ships ===
Donghai Rescue Bureau rescue vessels (named "Donghaijiu XX" 东海救XX号)
Name	Class	Year	Disp. (mt)	Dimensions (m)	Draft (m)	Power (kW)	Bollard Pull (kN)	Speed (kn)	Propulsion	Helos
Donghaijiu 501, 502				8.18×2.88×1.1	0.45	85×2		31	Helical x 2	
Donghaijiu 202		2013		49.9×13.1×4.5	1.9	2560×2		32	Pumpjet×2	
Donghaijiu 301		2011		17.5×4.3×1.9	0.92	588×2		32	Pumpjet×2	
Donghaijiu 117		2013	5,658	99×15.2×7.6	6.3	4500×2	1500	18.6	Var. pitch×2	
Donghaijiu 101	东海救101	2013	6,513	117×16.2×7.8	6	7200×2	1400	22	Var. pitch x 2	
Donghaijiu 116	东海救111	2011	4,896	99×15.2×7.6	6	4500×2	1050	22	Var. pitch x 2	
Donghaijiu 115	海救111	2010	4,896	99×15.2×7.6	6	4500×2	1050	22	Var. pitch x 2	
Donghaijiu 111	海救111	2005	4,896	98×15.2×7.6	6	4500×2	1050	20	Var. pitch x 2	
Donghaijiu 112	海救111	2006	4,896	98x15.2x7.6	6	4500×2	1050	20	Var. pitch x 2	
Donghaijiu 113	海救111	2009	4,896	99×15.2×7.6	6	4500×2	1050	20	Var. pitch×2	
Donghaijiu 131		2005	3,211	7×14×6.8	5.4	3360×2	800	20.1	Var. pitch×2	
Donghaijiu 201		2006	230	49.9×13.1×4.5	1.6	2240×2		30	Pumpjet×2	
Donghaijiu 209		1990	269	49.9×8.0×4.6	2	1740×3		28	Fixed pitch×3	
Donghaijiu 196		1981	1472	60.2×11.6×5.7	3.8/4.3	970×2	250	14	固定桨×2	
Donghaijiu 195		1979	1472	60.1×11.6×5.7	4.3/4.5	970×2	200	14	固定桨×2	
Huaying 388		2007	28	14.3×4.6×1.9	1.3	317×2	50	18	固定桨×2	

=== Airplanes ===
- AW189
- H175

== China Rescue and Salvage Exhibition Hall (中国救捞陈列馆) ==
The China Salvage Exhibition Hall was established in 2011, located in the Sea Rescue Building, No. 1426, Yangshupu Road, Shanghai. The exhibition hall covers an area of 1,636 square meters with general exhibits of salvage equipment, models, multimedia presentations, etc. The museum is open free of charge from August 2018.

== Leadership ==
- Wang Lei (王雷) — Bureau Chief, Party Deputy Secretary
- Shi Jun (时骏) — Party Secretary, Deputy Bureau Chief
- Ding Linjie (丁临杰) — Deputy Bureau Chief
- Ma Pingyuan (马平原) — Discipline Inspector
- Yin Jie (殷杰) — Deputy Bureau Chief
- Liu Mianzhang (刘锦章) — Deputy Bureau Chief
