= China Maritime Safety Administration =

Chinese Maritime Safety agency

China Maritime Safety Administration 中华人民共和国海事局
- Racing stripe of the China MSA

- Badge of the China MSA

- Flag of the China MSA
- Abbreviation: CMSA, China MSA

Agency overview
- Formed: October 1998
- Preceding agencies: China Ship Inspection Bureau; China Port Supervision Bureau
- Annual budget: 12.8 B RMB (2025)

Jurisdictional structure
- National agency: China
- Operations jurisdiction: China
- Governing body: Ministry of Transport of the People's Republic of China
- General nature: Civilian police

Operational structure
- Headquarters: Beijing
- Agency executives: Fu Xuyin (付绪银), Chief; Xu Wei (徐伟), Deputy Chief

Facilities
- Ground vehicles: 1600

Website
- msa.gov.cn

The Maritime Safety Administration of the People's Republic of China, commonly known as the China Maritime Safety Administration (China MSA or CMSA), is a civil government agency for maritime safety and regulation law enforcement and rescue, under the Ministry of Transport of China.

The agency is headquartered in Dongcheng, Beijing. The incumbent chief is Fu Xuyin, and the incumbent deputy chief is Xu Wei. In 2025, the Budget of the CMSA was 12.8 billion RMB.

The MSA is separate from the China Coast Guard, which is a branch of the People's Armed Police.

== History ==
CMSA was formed in October 1998 from the merger of the China Ship Inspection Bureau and the China Port Supervision Bureau. The agency is subordinated to the Ministry of Transport of the People's Republic of China.

== Organization ==
=== Subordinate Offices ===
The MSA's subordinate offices include:

- General Office
- Policy and Legislation Office
- Planning and Equipment Office
- Financial Affairs and Accountancy Office
- Human Resources and Training Office
- Traffic Management Office
- Ship Inspection Office
- Dangerous Goods and Pollution Prevention Management Office
- Ship Survey Management Office
- Ship Technical Specification Office
- Mariners Management Office
- Safety Management Office
- Navigation Service Management Office
- Fee Collection Office
- Science, Technology, and Information Office
- International Cooperation Office
- Accounting Office
- Party Work Department
- Information Office
- Disciplinary Inspection Office
- Party Committees Office

=== Units Directly Subordinate to the Ministry of Transport ===
- Northern Navigation Service Center (交通运输部北海航海保障中心)
- Eastern Navigation Service Center (交通运输部东海航海保障中心)
- Southern Navigation Service Center (交通运输部南海航海保障中心)

The China Rescue and Salvage Bureau operates as an independent entity under the Ministry of Transport, but it shares personnel and leadership with the MSA.

=== Operational organizations ===
The MSA operates primarily along the PRC coastline and the Yangtze River basin, Pearl River basin, and Heilongjiang River basin. The MSA maintains 15 Regional MSAs, some covering more than one of the 20 coastal and riverine provinces, under which 97 local branches have been established.

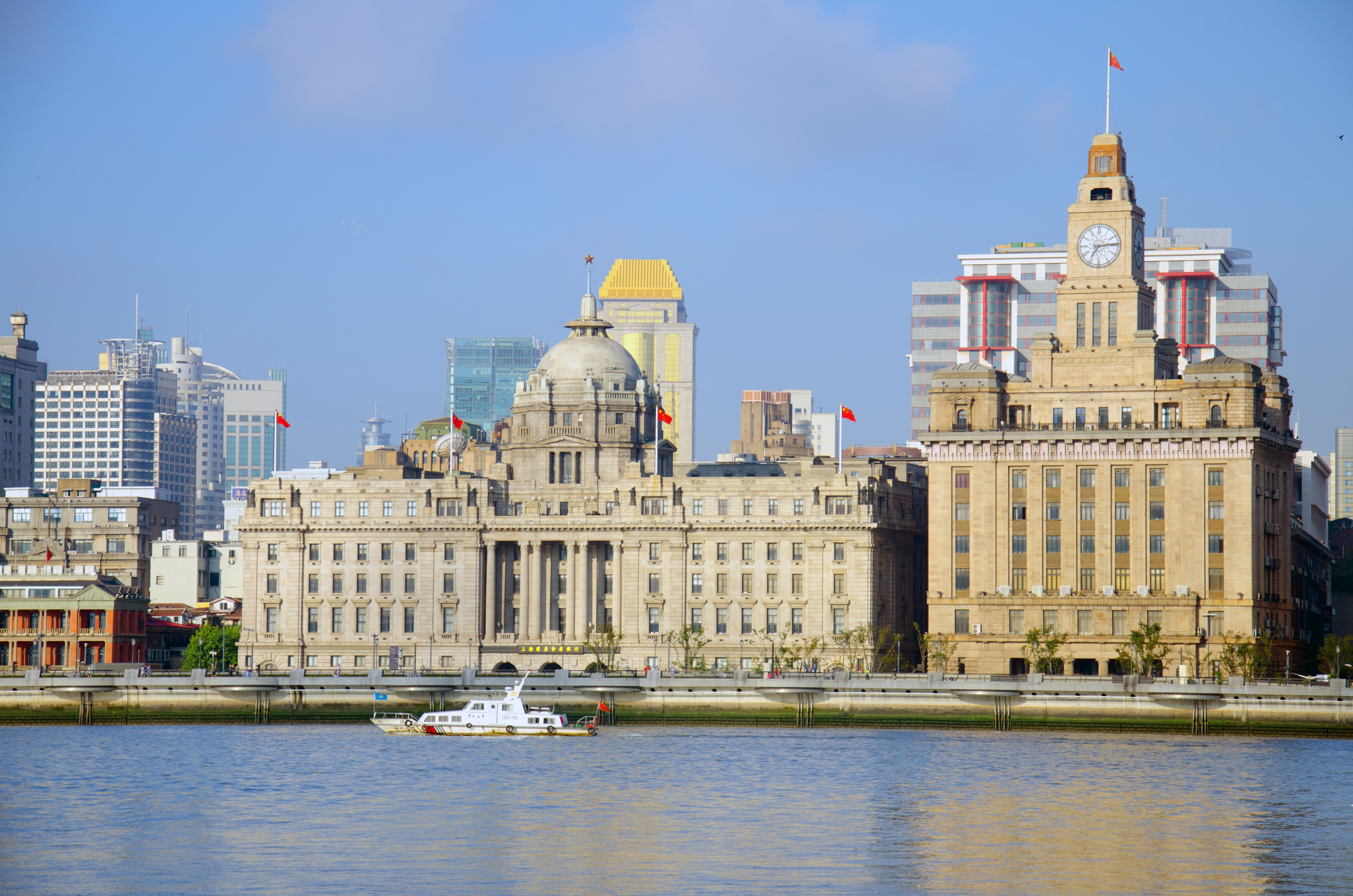
MSA vessel in Shanghai

=== Regional MSAs ===
- Shanghai MSA
- Tianjin MSA
- Liaoning MSA
- Hebei MSA
- Shandong MSA
- Jiangsu MSA
- Zhejiang MSA
- Fujian MSA
- Guangdong MSA
- Guangxi MSA
- Hainan MSA
- Changjiang MSA
- Heilongjiang MSA
- Shenzhen MSA
- Lianyungang MSA

== Mission ==
The MSA administers all matters related to maritime and shipping safety, including the supervision of maritime traffic safety and security, prevention of pollution from ships, inspection of ships and offshore facilities, navigational safety measures (including Search and Rescue, Aids to Navigation and the Global Maritime Distress and Safety System), administrative management of port operations, and law enforcement on matters of maritime safety law. It was also responsible for marine accident investigation.

== Ships ==
Ships of the CMSA
Ship class	NATO reporting name	Ships	Chinese name	Bureau	Photo
5000 tonne class cutter	Shuoshi I class cutter	Haixun 01	海巡01	Shanghai MSA	External image: http://politics.people.com.cn/BIG5/n/2013/0416/c70731-21159231.html
5000 tonne class cutter	Shuoshi III class cutter	Haixun 03	海巡03	Hainan MSA	
5000 tonne class cutter	Shuoshi III class cutter	Haixun 06	海巡06	Fujian MSA	External image: http://hb.people.com.cn/mediafile/pic/20210209/25/4406615152056655957.jpg
Research vessel	N/A	Haixun 08	海巡08	Eastern Navigation Service Center	External image: https://cdn.hk01.com/di/media/images/dw/20220708/622049947834912768036852.png/U553GOS_ZQKANaawyz3HPzOZHdO34w9YLCJ5WSwieVk?v=w1120
10000 tonne class cutter	Shuhan class cutter	Haixun 09	海巡09	Guangdong MSA	External image: https://cdn.hk01.com/di/media/images/dw/20211028/530432604504068096304915.jpeg/MigdCCvoKFfgWyD45f_loj9rDVOfxGbQFcMSQRXDEkE?v=w1920
3000 tonne class cutter	Shubian class cutter	Haixun 11	海巡11	Shandong MSA North Sea patrol flotilla	External image: http://img.ifeng.com/res/200903/0302_555107.jpg
3000 tonne class cutter	Shubian class cutter	Haixun 31	海巡31	Guangdong MSA	
1000 tonne class	Haixun I class cutter	Haixun 21	海巡21	Hainan MSA	External image: http://img.ifeng.com/res/200807/0701_408048.jpg
80 meter class rescue cutter	Shuling class cutter	Haixun 22	海巡22	Zhejiang MSA	External image: https://x0.ifengimg.com/ucms/2022_12/3B13198467D48677DDCC8197A6B1C9F29B5E7047_size50_w1080_h605.jpg
	Weijiao class pollution control ship	Haixun 041	海巡041	Hebei MSA	External image: https://www.thepaper.cn/newsDetail_forward_28371524
	Shugong class cutter	Haixun 103	海巡103		
60 meter Type B class	Type 630 II patrol boat	Haixun 012	海巡012	Shanghai MSA East Sea patrol flotilla	External image: http://military.people.com.cn/NMediaFile/2014/0710/MAIN201407100812000533208737182.jpg
60 meter Type B class	Type 630 II patrol boat	Haixun 156	海巡156		
60 meter Type B class	Type 630 II patrol boat	Haixun 168	海巡168		
60 meter Type B class	Type 630 II patrol boat	Haixun 0302	海巡0302	Dalian MSA (subordinate to Liaoning MSA)	
60 meter Type B class	Type 630 II patrol boat	Haixun 0491	海巡0491	Caofeidian MSA (subordinate to Hebei MSA)	
60 meter Type B class	Type 630 II patrol boat	Haixun 0492	海巡0492	Hebei MSA	
60 meter Type B class	Type 630 II patrol boat	Haixun 0522	海巡0522	Yantai MSA (subordinate to Shandong MSA)	External image: http://paper.people.com.cn/rmrbhwb/res/2014-01/10/04/hwbdeyw110c004_b.jpg
60 meter Type B class	Type 630 II patrol boat	Haixun 0581	海巡0581	Rizhao MSA (subordinate to Shandong MSA)	
60 meter Type B class	Type 630 II patrol boat	Haixun 0591	海巡0591	Weihai MSA (subordinate to Shandong MSA)	
60 meter Type B class	Type 630 II patrol boat	Haixun 0735	海巡0735	Zhoushan MSA (subordinate to Zhejiang MSA)	External image: http://app.zgsyb.com/data/1/images/2025/0312/17417436533401795_1280x720.jpg
60 meter Type B class	Type 630 II patrol boat	Haixun 0806	海巡0806	Quanzhou MSA (subordinate to Fujian MSA)	
60 meter Type B class	Type 630 II patrol boat	Haixun 1001	海巡1001	Qinzhou MSA (subordinate to Guangxi MSA)	
60 meter Type B class	Type 630 II patrol boat	Haixun 1103	海巡1103	Sanya MSA (subordinate to Hainan MSA)	
60 meter Type B class	Type 630 II patrol boat	Haixun 1108	海巡1108	Basuo MSA (subordinate to Hainan MSA)	
60 meter Type B class	Type 630 II patrol boat	Haixun 1109	海巡1109		
60 meter Type B class	Type 630 II patrol boat	Haixun 1110	海巡1110		
60 meter Type B class	Type 630 II patrol boat	Haixun 1111	海巡1111	Yangpu MSA (subordinate to Hainan MSA)	
60 meter Type B class	Type 630 I class patrol boat	Haixun 053	海巡053		
60 meter Type B class	Type 630 I class patrol boat	Haixun 154	海巡154		
60 meter Type B class	Type 630 I class patrol boat	Haixun 0571	海巡0571	Qingdao MSA (subordinate to Shandong MSA)	
60 meter Type B class	Type 630 I class patrol boat	Haixun 0751	海巡0751	Taizhou MSA (subordinate to Zhejiang MSA)	External image: http://5b0988e595225.cdn.sohucs.com/images/20191029/2a7d8be60bf849dba9f321af4f0ef3b0.jpeg
	Shuzao I class patrol boat	Haixun 089	海巡089	Jiangsu MSA	
	Shuzao I class patrol boat	Haixun 113	海巡113		
	Shuzao I class patrol boat	Haixun 132	海巡132		
	Shuzao I class patrol boat	Haixun 153	海巡153		
	Shuzao I class patrol boat	Haixun 183	海巡183	Haikou MSA (subordinate to Hainan MSA)	
	Shuzao I class patrol boat	Haixun 0691	海巡0691	Nantong MSA (subordinate to Jiangsu MSA)	
Buoy tender	N/A	Haixun 153	海巡153	Northern Navigation Service Center Yantai Office	External image: http://paper.people.com.cn/rmrb/images/1/20240809/1723147232128_1.jpg
Icebreaker/buoy tender	N/A	Haixun 156	海巡156	Northern Navigation Service Center	External image: http://www.news.cn/politics/2023-01/16/1129290200_16738614291191n.jpg
Buoy tender	N/A	Haixun 160	海巡160	Eastern Navigation Service Center	External image: https://img2.eworldship.com/cbw/2019/0629/20190629110249767.jpg
Buoy tender	N/A	Haixun 173	海巡173	Southern Navigation Service Center Guangzhou Office	External image: http://p1.img.cctvpic.com/cportal/cnews-yz/img/2020/07/23/54c3b56993bd48c89ef2b40091962b2c_16x9.jpg
40 meter Type B class patrol boat	N/A	Haixun 0921	海巡0921	Shantou MSA (Subordinate to Guangdong MSA)	
40 meter Type B class patrol boat	N/A	Haixun 0927	海巡0927	Zhanjiang MSA (Subordinate to Guangdong MSA)	
Patrol boat	N/A	Haixun 1461	海巡1461	Bao'an MSA (Subordinate to Shenzhen MSA)	
Patrol boat	N/A	Haixun 05211	海巡05211	Yantai MSA (subordinate to Shandong MSA)	
Patrol boat	N/A	Haixun 09111	海巡09111	Panyu MSA Office (Subordinate to Guangdong MSA)	
Patrol boat	N/A	Haixun 09698	海巡9698	Shaoguan MSA (subordinate to Guangdong MSA)	
Electric patrol boat	N/A	Haixun 10765	海巡10765	Li River MSA Office (Subordinate to Guilin MSA and Guangxi MSA)	External image: https://cdn.hk01.com/di/media/images/dw/20250123/959071647443193856234706.jpeg/6nVCx2-sqNn0tu65faktUQ-UpsZe5jPJ1r1NJ9a9TSc?v=w1920r16_9

== Equipment ==
As of July 2024, the CMSA operates approximately 1600 land vehicles, including 82 communications vehicles, 119 emergency response vehicles, 1118 patrol vehicles, 51 specialist vehicles and 230 other vehicles.

- RHIB
- Harbin Z-9 helicopter - contracted out to CITIC Offshore Helicopter
- Eurocopter EC 135
- Changhe Aircraft Industries Corporation CA109

== Leadership ==
Bureau chiefs:

- Xu Zuyuan (徐祖远) (March 2008－August 2013)
- Chen Aiping (陈爱平) (August 2013－April 2016)
- Xu Ruqing (许如清) (April 2016－January 2019)
- Cao Desheng (曹德胜) (January 2019－February 2022)
- Li Guoping (李国平) (February 2022－May 2023)
- Fu Xuyin (付绪银) (May 2023－)

== Ranks ==
Rank (Chinese)	首席海事总监 Shǒuxí hǎishì zǒngjiān	海事总监 Hǎishì zǒngjiān	海事副总监一级 Hǎishì fù zǒngjiān yī jí	海事副总监二级 Hǎishì fù zǒngjiān èr jí	海事副总监三级 Hǎishì fù zǒngjiān sān jí	海事监督长一级 Hǎishì jiāndū zhǎng yī jí	海事监督长二级 Hǎishì jiāndū cháng èr jí	海事监督长三级 Hǎishì jiāndū zhǎng sān jí	海事监督官一级 Hǎishì jiāndū guān yī jí	海事监督官二级 Hǎishì jiāndū guān èr jí	海事监督官三级 Hǎishì jiāndū guān sān jí	海事监督员一级 Hǎishì jiāndū yuán yī jí	海事监督员二级 Hǎishì jiāndū yuán èr jí	海事见习人员 Hǎishì jiànxí rényuán
Rank (English)	Chief Maritime Director	Maritime Director	Deputy Maritime Director 1st Class	Deputy Maritime Director 2nd Class	Deputy Maritime Director 3rd Class	Maritime Supervision Chief 1st Class	Maritime Supervision Chief 2nd Class	Maritime Supervision Chief 3rd Class	Maritime Supervision Official 1st Class	Maritime Supervision Official 2nd Class	Maritime Supervision Official 3rd Class	Maritime Supervision Officer 1st Class	Maritime Supervision Officer 2nd Class	Probationary Maritime Supervision Officer
Insignia														

== See also ==
- China Coast Guard
- China Marine Surveillance
- International Convention for the Safety of Life at Sea
- International Regulations for Preventing Collisions at Sea
- China Ministry of Transport
- China Rescue and Salvage Bureau
- Haixun 01
