= Port of Qinhuangdao =

Port in North China

Coordinates: 39°55′20″N 119°37′7″E

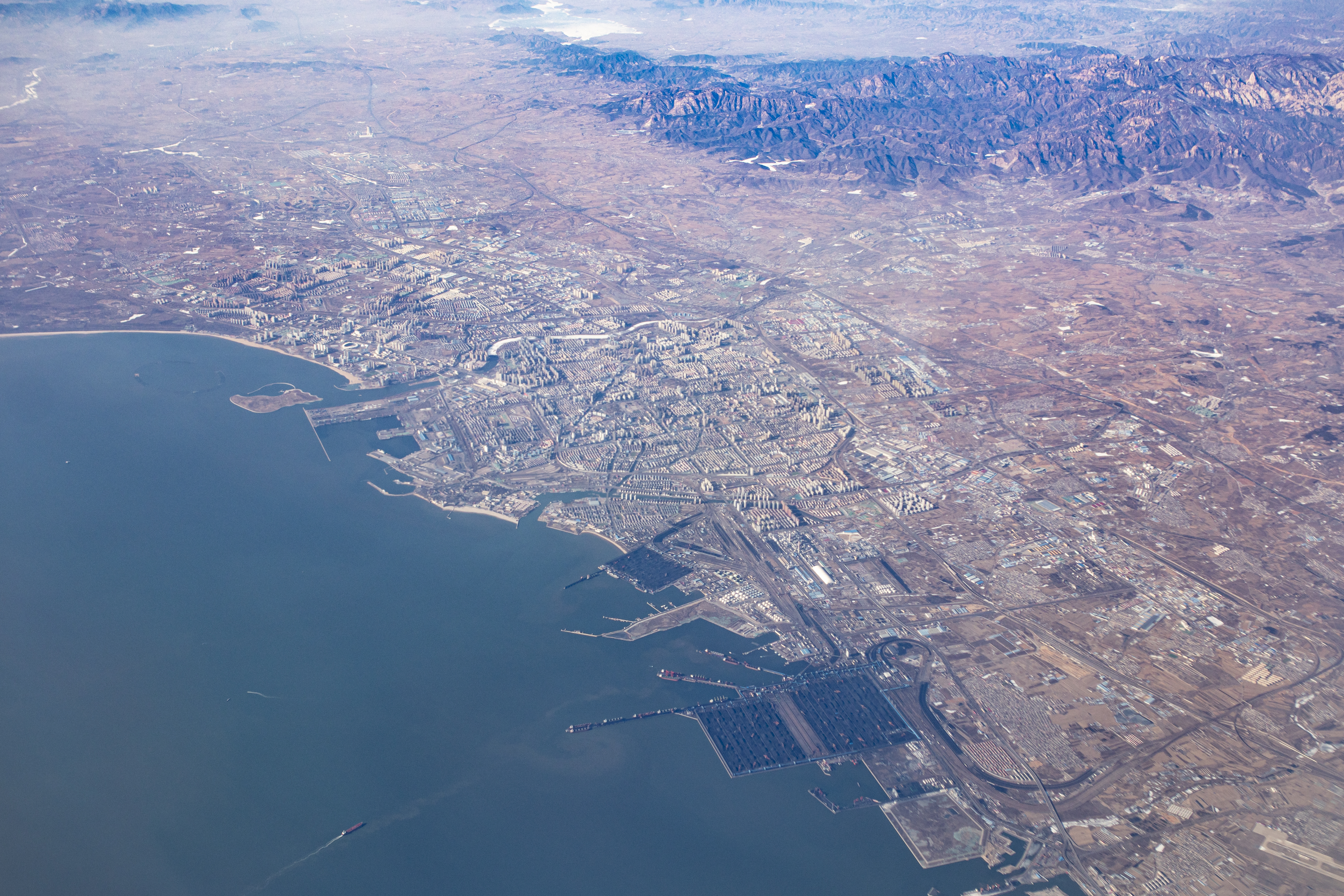
Aerial view of Port of Qinhuangdao

Port of Qinhuangdao is a seaport on the Bohai Sea, located in the Haigang District of urban Qinhuangdao, Hebei, People's Republic of China.

Together with the Port of Huanghua, Qinhuangdao Port is a major port for coal transportation.

Qinhuangdao is the nation's coal shipping center which is also seen as a barometer of the economy. The daily transport capacity was at least 50 vessels per day in the past.
