= Port of Fuzhou =

Coordinates: 26°05′24″N 119°13′34″E

Port of Fuzhou 福州港
- Interactive map of Port of Fuzhou 福州港

Location
- Country: People's Republic of China
- Location: Fuzhou, Fujian

Details
- Operated by: Fuzhou Port Group Corporation, Ltd.
- Type of harbour: Natural Estuary Seaport & Artificial Deep-water Seaport

Statistics
- Annual cargo tonnage: 127 million tonnes (2013)
- Website; Port of Fuzhou website

The Port of Fuzhou is a natural seaport centered on the estuary of the Minjiang River artificial deep-water international seaport on the coast of Fuzhou, Fujian, People's Republic of China. and of the neighboring prefecture of Ningde. The Port is located on the southeastern coast of Fujian, facing the Taiwan Strait. Fuzhou is the Mainland port closest to Taiwan, being just 149 Nautical miles from Keelung.

In 2013, Fuzhou port had a total cargo throughput of 127 million tonnes, an annual increase of 11.82%. Container traffic with Taiwan was 332,500 TEU, an increase of 6.09%. and the regular ferry route between Pingtan wharf and Taichung and Taipei in Taiwan had 144,400 passengers, and increase of 4.09%. The port is part of the Maritime Silk Road.

== History ==
The Port of Ningde merged with the Port of Fuzhou in 2009.

== Layout ==
In 2012 it had 178 production berths, of which 46 were deep-water berths of 10,000DWT or over, of which 18 50,000DWT or over, of which in turn 14 had 100,000DWT capacity. Of the 77 shallow-water berths, 47 could handle 1,000DWT or more.

The Jiangyin channel permits container ships of up to 150,000DWT, Luoyuanwan channel allows bulk carriers of up to 300,000DWT and Fuqingwan 100,000DWT channel is currently being dredged.

The Port of Fuzhou has nine port areas within and without the Minjiang estuary, and extends beyond Fuzhou Prefecture to neighboring Ningde.

- Pingtan Port Area (平潭港区)
- Jiangyin Port Area (江阴港区) or New Fuzhou Port
- Songxia Port Area (松下港区)
- Minjiangkounei Port Area (闽江口内港区)
- Luoyuanwan Port Area (罗源湾港区)
- Sanduao Port Area (三都澳港区): Ningde
- Baima Port Area (白马港区): Ningde
- Sansha Port Area (三沙港区): Ningde
- Sacheng Port Area (沙埕港区): Ningde
