= Loaita Bank =

Bank in the Spratly Islands

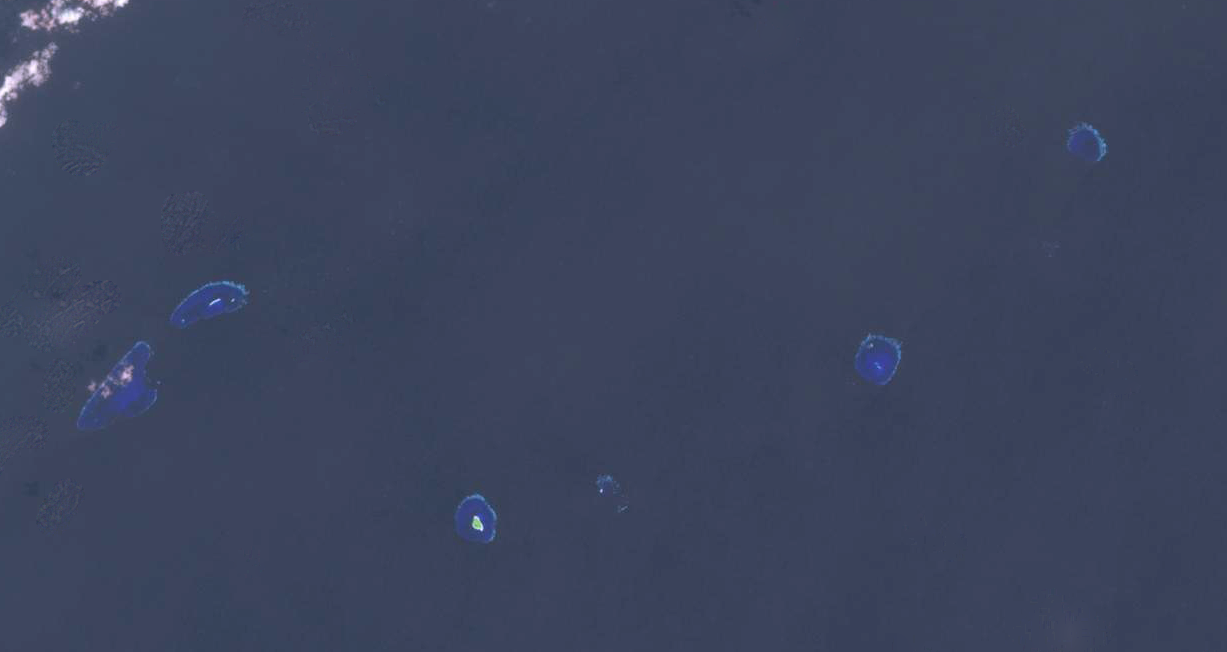
Space photograph of southern part of Loaita Bank

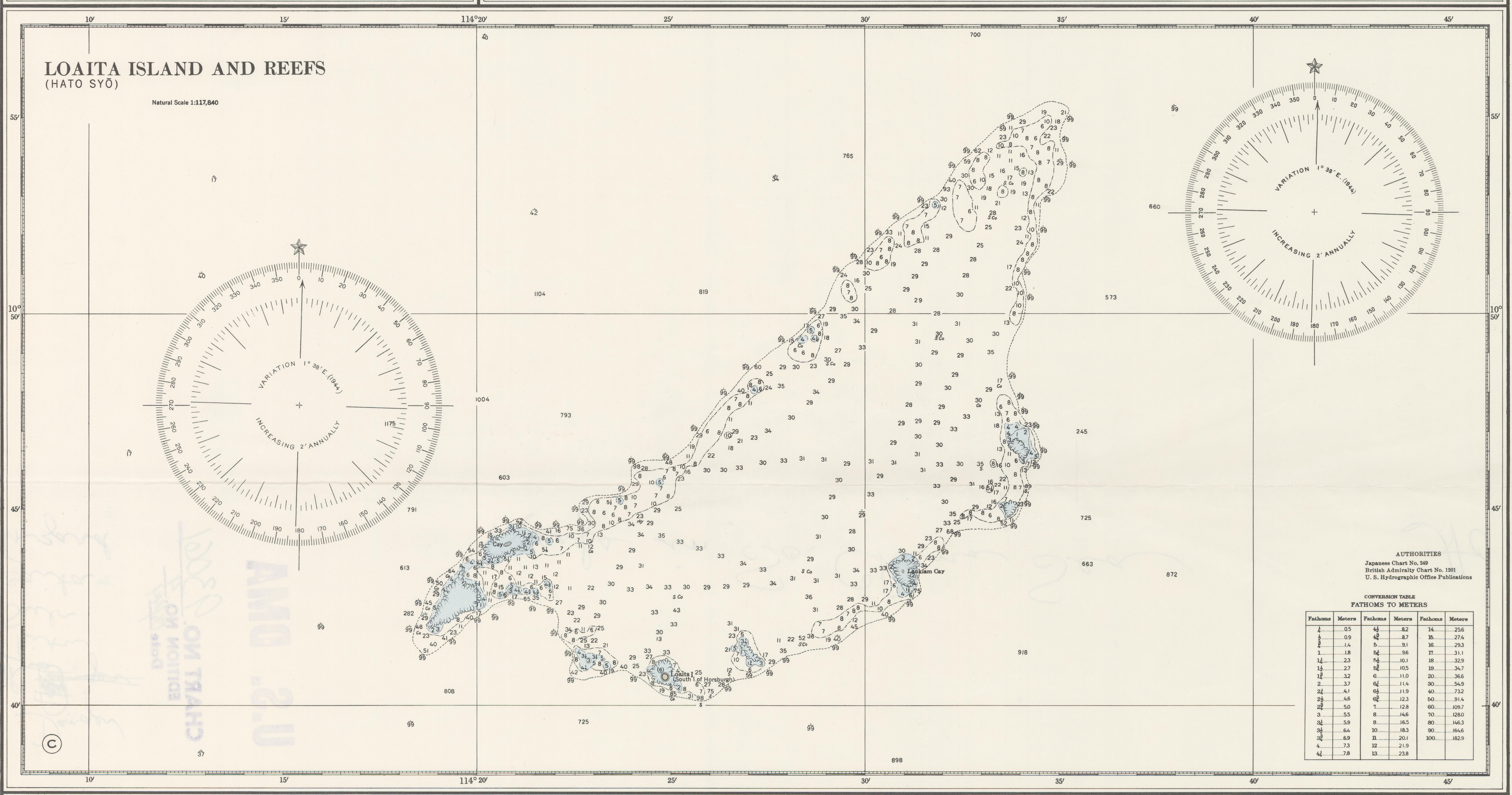
Nautical chart of 1911

The Loaita Bank, (Filipino: Pampang ng Kota); (Vietnamese: Cụm Loại Ta); (Chinese: 道明群礁; pinyin: Dàomíng Qúnjiāo), (10°45′N 114°30′E) is one of the significant maritime features in the Spratly Islands. It is about 20 nautical miles (37 km; 23 mi) long on its NE-SW axis, and extends from Loaita Island to the NW of Dangerous Ground.

The bank contains a number of maritime features, including shoals, reefs, an island, two sand cays, and a lagoon:

- Loaita Island (10°41′N 114°25′E)
- Lankiam Cay (10°43′N 114°32′E)
- Loaita Nan (Loaita Southwest Reef)
- Loaita Cay

(10°43′43″N 114°21′09″E)

- and numerous less well defined/named shoals and reefs.

At the NE end of the bank there is "a ridge of foul ground that is an extension" of the bank; Menzies Reef (11°09′N 114°48′E) lies at the NE end of this ridge, inside Dangerous Ground.

It is neighboured by the Thitu Reefs and Subi Reef to the NW, Irving Reef to the east, North Danger Reef to the north, and the Tizard and Union Banks to the south.
