= Loaita Island =

Island in the West Philippine Sea

Disputed island
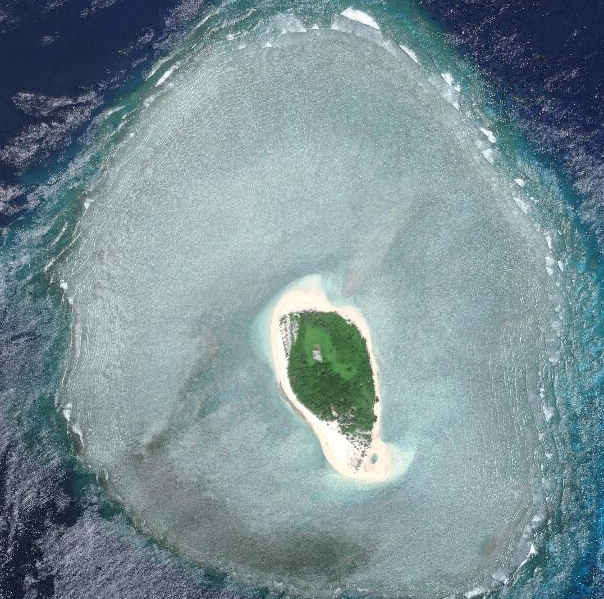
- Loaita Island

- Location within Spratly Islands
- Other names: Kota Island (Philippine English); Pulo ng Kota (Filipino); Đảo Loại Ta (Vietnamese) 南鑰島 / 南钥岛 Nányào Dǎo (Chinese)

Geography
- Location: West Philippine Sea
- Coordinates: 10°40′N 114°25′E
- Archipelago: Spratly Islands

Administration
- Philippines
- Region: IV-B - MIMAROPA
- Province: Palawan
- Municipality: Kalayaan

Claimed by
- China
- Philippines
- Taiwan
- Vietnam

Additional information

Kota Island (Filipino: Pulo ng Kota; Mandarin Chinese: 南鑰島/南钥岛; pinyin: Nányào Dǎo, and Vietnamese: Đảo Loại Ta), with an area of 6.45 hectares (15.9 acres) -- is the tenth largest of the naturally occurring Spratly Islands, and the fifth largest of the Philippine-occupied islands. It is located just to the west of the northern part of Dangerous Ground, and is 22 miles (35 km) southeast of Philippine-occupied Thitu Island (Pag-asa) and 22 miles (35 km) north-northeast of Taiwan-occupied Itu Aba Island.

The island is administered by the Philippines as part of Kalayaan, Palawan.

The island is also claimed by the People's Republic of China, the Republic of China (Taiwan) and Vietnam.

== Environment ==
The island fringes the Loaita Bank, shoals and reefs. Its calcarenite outcrop is visible along its western side at low tide. The present shape of the island indicates sand buildup along its eastern side. The anchor-shaped side will eventually connect with the northern portion as the sand buildup continues, thereby creating another mini-lagoon in the process. The presence of migrating sea birds adds to the high phosphorus content of the island's sand. Occasionally, giant sea turtles lay their eggs on the island. The island is covered with mangrove bushes, above which rise coconut palms and other small trees.

== History ==
On 22 May 1963, a sovereignty stele was rebuilt on Loaita Island by crew members of the three vessels Huong Giang, Chi Lang and Ky Hoa of the South Vietnam.

Several Philippine soldiers have been stationed on the island since 1968 when the Philippines occupied it. There are only a few structures, which serve as shelters for the soldiers.

The soldiers also guard the nearby Loaita Cay (Panata) and the unoccupied Loaita Nan which lies about 8 miles (13 km) to the east-northwest. The cay is under observation from a tall structure on the island, and the Philippine soldiers also regularly visit it.

The Lankiam Cay (Kota Cay), which is distinct from Kota, lie 5 miles (8.0 km) northeast and 1.5 miles (2.4 km) east-northeast. These is unoccupied features, but is also largely controlled by the Philippines.

== See also ==
- List of maritime features in the Spratly Islands
- Policies, activities and history of the Philippines in Spratly Islands
