= Loaita Nan =

Shoal in Loaita Bank of Spratly Islands

Loaita Nan Loaita Southwest
Disputed shoal
- Location within Spratly Islands

Geography
- Location: South China Sea
- Coordinates: 10°42′1″N 114°19′1″E
- Archipelago: Spratly Islands

Administration
- Philippines
- Region: IV-B - MIMAROPA
- Province: Palawan
- Municipality: Kalayaan

Claimed by
- China
- City: Sansha, Hainan
- Philippines
- Municipality: Kalayaan, Palawan
- Taiwan
- Municipality District: Kaohsiung; Cijin
- Vietnam
- District: Trường Sa, Khánh Hòa

Loaita Nan, also known as Loaita Southwest, (Filipino: Bahura ng Kota Magbanua; Vietnamese: Loại Ta Nam; Mandarin Chinese: 双黄沙洲; pinyin: Shuāng Huáng Shāzhōu) is a shoal in the Loaita Bank of the Spratly Islands. Located at the southwest end of Daoming Reefs, it is composed of coral reefs. It is claimed by the government of China, Taiwan and the Philippines. Loaita Cay is northeast of Loaita Nan.

== History ==
Chinese fishermen has described Loaita Nan as "double yellows". In 1983, The Chinese government announced that the Chinese name of the shoal is Shuanghuang Shazhou.

== Environment ==
The sandbar looks like two egg yolks at low tide, hence its name. The length at high tide is 0.25 km (0.16 mi), the length of the reef is 2 kilometres (1.2 mi), the width at high tide is 60 metres (200 ft), the width of the Loaita Nan is 1.1 km (0.68 mi), the shallow water depth is 5.4–9 m (18–30 ft), and the central deep water is 20.1 m (66 ft).

== See also ==
- Policies, activities and history of the Philippines in Spratly Islands
