= Irving Reef =

Disputed atoll
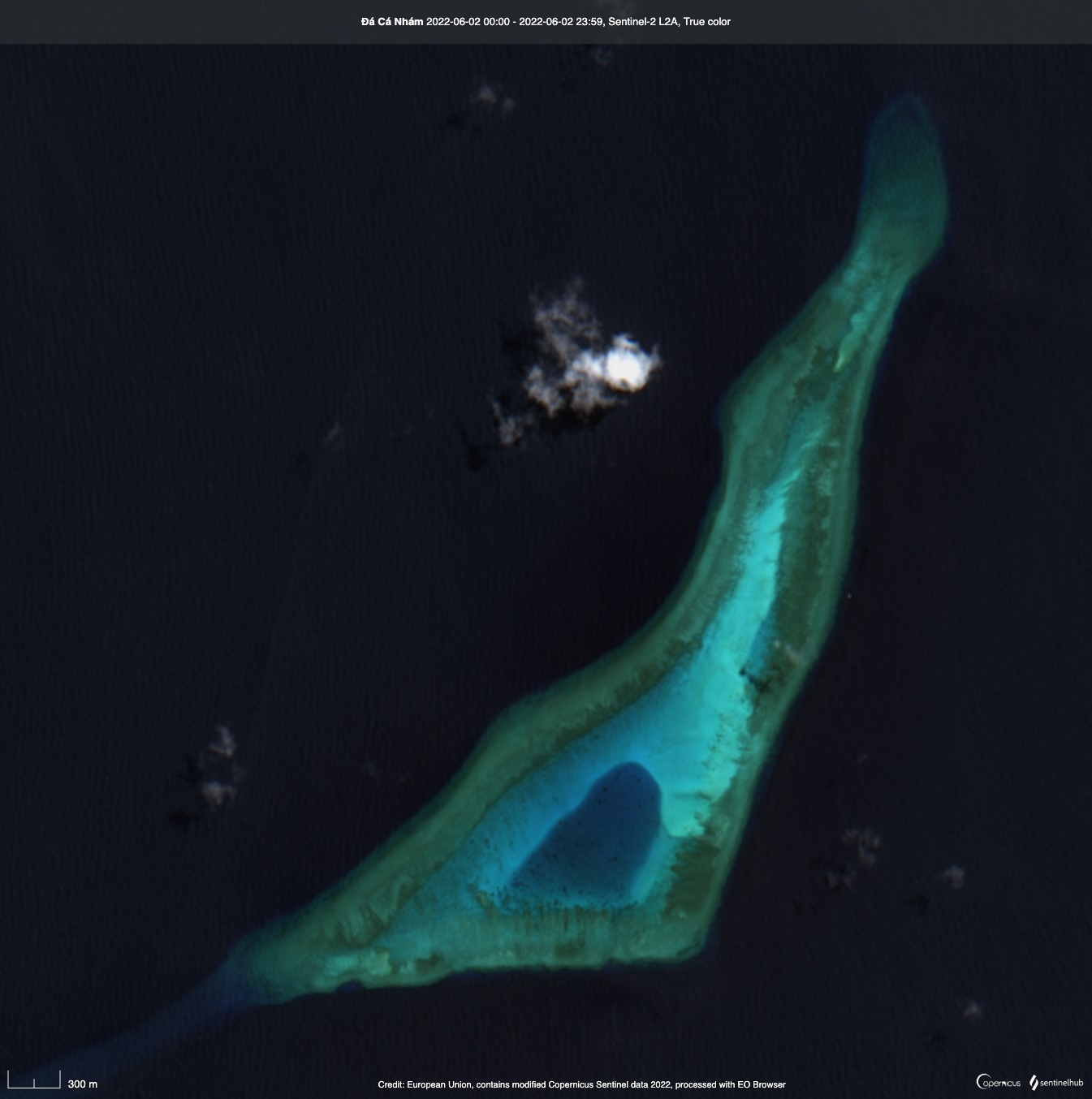
- Irving Reef

- Location within Spratly Islands
- Other names: Balagtas Reef (Philippine English); Bahura ng Balagtas (Filipino) đá Đá Nhám (Vietnamese) 火艾礁 Huǒ'ài Jiāo (Chinese)

Geography
- Location: South China Sea
- Coordinates: 10°52′N 114°55′E
- Archipelago: Spratly Islands

Administration
- Philippines
- Region: IV-B - MIMAROPA
- Province: Palawan
- Municipality: Kalayaan

Claimed by
- China
- Philippines
- Taiwan
- Vietnam

Irving Reef, also known as Balagtas Reef (Filipino: Bahura ng Balagtas; Mandarin Chinese: 火艾礁; pinyin: Huǒ'ài Jiāo, Vietnamese: đá Cá Nhám), is a coral atoll in the Spratly Islands, South China Sea. It is occupied by the Philippines as part of Kalayaan, Palawan, and is also claimed by the People's Republic of China, the Republic of China (Taiwan) and Vietnam.

The atoll is 11 nautical miles (20 km; 13 mi) southwest of West York Island. It is 2 nautical miles (3.7 km; 2.3 mi) in length. There is a sand cay near the northern extremity.
