= Eugenio B. Bito-onon Jr. =

Filipino politician

Eugenio B. Bito-onon Jr. is a Filipino politician and member of the Liberal Party, who has been elected Kalayaan Mayor twice, serving since 2010. He was re-elected in May 2013, winning his re-election bid with 108 votes against rivals Noel Osorio (69 votes) and Rosendo Mantes (46 votes). Bit-onon failed in his re-election bid in 2016, coming in second place with 59 votes and losing to the eventual winner Roberto "Choy" M, del Mundo with 142 votes.

Bito-onon is a pioneer and town planner who moved to Thitu Island in 1997 to help strengthen Filipino sovereignty claims to the South China Sea. Believing that a civilian presence helps to strengthen Filipino claims to the South China Sea. Bito-onon helped to establish the first deliberately settled civilian town in the Spratlys on Thitu Island in 2001. In June 2012, he helped establish the Pag-Asa Elementary School, the first school on Thitu Island. Referred to by Hayton as Cloma's heir, Bito-onon also oversaw the completion of a small statue of Tomas Cloma on Thitu Island.

Bito-onon is a strong supporter of Filipino sovereignty and vocal critic of Chinese activities in the South China Sea. Bit-onon has also actively promoted international awareness of the Filipino view of the dispute, having hosted and acted as a guide for multiple international news organizations, including Seth Doane from CBS News, Eric Campbell from ABC News, and other reporters, including ones from The New York Times , CNN and the Asahi Shimbun, in tours of the Filipino-held islands of the South China Sea. He has had several encounters with the Chinese Coast Guard while travelling around the Filipino-occupied Spratly Islands.

Bito-onon advocates greater US involvement in the South China Sea dispute. He has visited the US and held meetings with the Filipino-American community to promote awareness and elicit support for his cause. He also promotes turning the Spratly Islands into an ecotourism zone.

Bito-onon claims that the energy resources in the South China Sea are enough to support China's needs for the next 105 years. Thus, he believes that the Philippines should occupy the remaining unoccupied islets in the South China Sea, as the possible energy resources would also safeguard Filipino energy independence.

Based primarily in Puerto Princesa, where his office resides, Bito-onon is generally only able to visit Thitu Island once a year. His wife lives and works in Puerto Princesa. Together, they have two sons.
