= Philippines and the Spratly Islands =

Philippine policies, actions and history in the Spratly Islands

Philippines and the Spratly Islands – this article discusses the policies, activities and history of the Republic of the Philippines in the Spratly Islands from the Philippine perspective. Non-Philippine viewpoints regarding Philippine occupation of several islands are currently not included in this article.

This article often uses the Philippine names of the maritime features, rather than the international names.

== Overview ==
Unofficial NAMRIA map showing features in the Kalayaan Island Group (Spartly Islands). Features names are those recognized by Philippine government.

The Philippines, along with Vietnam, the People's Republic of China (PRC), the Republic of China (ROC), Malaysia and Brunei, is a claimant country in the disputed Spratly Islands of the South China Sea.

As of 2020, the Philippines are occupying and/or controlling eleven features (eight islands, three reefs), as detailed in the following table:

Philippine name	Int'l name	Area	Notes
Islands
Pagasa	Thitu Island	37.2 ha. (2nd largest)	pag-asa means hope
Likas	West York Island	18.6 ha. (3rd largest)	líkas means natural or evacuate
Parola	Northeast Cay	12.7 ha. (5th largest)	parola means lighthouse
Lawak	Nanshan Island	7.93 ha. (8th largest)	lawak means vastness
Kota island	Loaita Island	6.45 ha. (10th largest)	kota means fortress
Patag	Flat Island	0.57 ha. (14th largest)	patag means flat
Panata	Loaita Cay	0.53 ha. (15th largest)	panata means oath
Kota Cay	Lankiam Cay	0.44 ha. (16th largest)	
Reefs
Rizal	Commodore Reef		Dr. José P. Rizal is a national hero of the Philippines
Balagtas	Irving Reef		Francisco Balagtas is a famous Filipino poet
Ayungin	Second Thomas Shoal		Ayungín is Leiopotherapon plumbeus, a fish species

By comparison, within the Spratly Islands:

- Vietnam occupies and/or controls six islands, seventeen reefs and three banks,
- ROC occupies and/or controls one island and one reef,
- Malaysia occupies and/or controls one artificial island and five reefs, and
- PRC occupies and/or controls eight reefs.

Also, the Philippines has some features that are "virtually occupied". These are features that lie in very close proximity to Philippine-occupied features, and can be seen within the horizon. (A 15 meter-height vision gives about 9 miles (14 km) of horizon distance). These include: North Reef, Sandy Cay, Loaita Nan and Loaita Cay.

Also, most features that lie to the east of the 116°E Meridian of longitude, though not necessarily occupied, are largely controlled by the Philippines.

== Unoccupied features ==
Unoccupied but Largely Controlled by the Philippines
The reefs, shoals, etc. to the east of the 116°E meridian are closely guarded by the Philippine Coast Guard, Philippine Navy and Air Force. Though not occupied, the Philippines asserts control over these features which are less 100 miles (160 km) from the Palawan west coast (note: Scarborough Shoal is 100 miles (160 km) from Zambales west coast). There are many Filipino fishermen in this region, who cooperate closely with the Philippine Coast Guard and Philippine Navy. Non-Filipino fishermen are tolerated in this region, provided that they comply with Philippine laws. The press in the Philippines have reported many arrests of Chinese fishermen by the Philippine Navy because of illegal fishing methods and catching of endangered sea species, both in this region and in the Sulu Sea. Philippine military presence in this region intensified after the 1995 Mischief Reef incident. The Philippine Air Force has been active in striking even the markers set up by other countries to guide the latter's naval forces in this region.
Int'l Name	Philippine Name	Description
Amy Douglas Bank / Reef	Del Rio	Lies north of Palawan Passage. Awash at low tide.
Boxall Reef	Rajah Sulayman	9°26′N 116°55′E; Several rocks are exposed at low tide. Surrounds a lagoon.
Carnatic Shoal	Sikatuna	
Director Shoal / Reef	Tamban	8°30′N 115°55′E
First Thomas Shoal	Bulig	9°19′N 115°57′E - SE of Mischief Reef A few rocks are permanently above sea level. Much of the reef is above water at low tide. Encloses a lagoon.
Ganges Reef	Palma	9°23′N 114°11′E
Half Moon Shoal	Hasa-hasa	Several rocks on the eastern side rise one to two feet above high tide. Encloses a lagoon. Reports in February 2016 indicate the Philippine control of the reef might have ended.
Hardy Reef	Sakay/Hubo	10°8′7.9″N 116°8′16.3″E; Naturally above water only at low tide. Surrounds a narrow strip of sand.
Hopkins Reef	Dumara	10°52′N 116°15′E
Investigator Northeast Shoal	Dalagang Bukid	Lies only a few miles west of Palawan. Naturally above water at low tide.
Iroquois Reef	Rozul	10°39′N 116°10′E; Lies east of both Philippine-occupied Nanshan Island and Flat Island. Above water only at low tide.
Leslie Bank	Urduja	
Lord Auckland Shoal	Lapu-Lapu	
Lys Shoal	Bisugo	
Northeast Shea Reef	Ponce	Lies only a few miles north of Commodore Reef. Above water only at low tide.
Pennsylvania North Reef	Del Pilar	10°48′N 116°51′E
Pennsylvania South Reef	Anota	10°21′N 116°34′E
Reed Tablemount (including Nares Bank and Marie Louise Bank)	Recto	Shallowest natural depth is 9 m. About 2,500 square miles (6,500 km^{2}) in area. The Philippines occupied this feature in 1971 and a Philippine-Sweden joint oil-exploration followed afterwards. However, China protested this act of the Philippines saying that this tablemount which center lies 100 miles (160 km) from the Philippines is part of China's territories. After that, the Philippines tried asking China for a joint effort but China declined, arguing that the Philippines has no right in this feature. Presently, this feature is largely controlled by the Philippines.
Royal Captain Shoal	Kanduli	A few rocks are above water at low tide. Surrounds a lagoon.
Sabina Shoal	Escoda	It encloses two lagoons, naturally above water at low tide. Lies east of the Philippine-occupied Second Thomas Reef.
Sandy Shoal	Mabuhangin	11°3′N 117°38′E
Seahorse Shoal / Seashore Shoal / Routh Bank	Baybayin Dagat	Lies north of Palawan Passage
Stag Shoal	Panday Pira	8°24′N 112°57′E
Southern Bank / Reef	Katimugan	10°30′N 116°40′E; A group of features located south of Reed Tablemount. The reef includes: Magat Salamat, Tagpi, Hubo Reef, and Katimugan Banks/Reef. The area is largely controlled and used for fishing by the Philippines due to its proximity to Flat Island and Nanshan Island.
Templar Bank	Dalag	11°9′N 117°14′E
Trident Shoal	Tatlong-tulis	
Viper North Shoal	Maya-maya	
Viper Shoal	Tomas Claudio	7°50′N 115°0′E
Others
Royal Charlotte Reef		Being claimed by Malaysia

Not occupied by any country
These are unoccupied features which have been given Philippine names. Some sources say that some of these features are occupied by Vietnam or China, but most sources say that they are not occupied. "Occupation" is possibly confused because the said reefs are very close to other occupied features. There are many unoccupied features in the Spratly chain. The current Code of Conduct prohibits any country from acquiring new features. Many of these features are actually in between and/or near two or more occupied features of different countries. Thus, they serve like buffer zones.
Int'l Name	(Philippines) Philippine Name	Description
Alicia Annie Reef	Arellano	09°25′N 115°26′E; A sand "cay", 1.2 m high. Many rocks above high tide line. Reef encloses a lagoon.
Deane Reef	Macapagal	Above water only at low tide. Part of Jackson Atoll (Quirino Atoll).
Dickinson Reef	Aquinaldo	Above water only at low tide. Part of Jackson Atoll (Quirino Atoll).
Discovery Small Reef	Silangang Paredes	Above water only at low tide.
Eldad Reef	Malvar	Above water only at low tide. Part of Tizard Bank (Bayani Bank).
Hampson Reef	Garcia	Above water only at low tide. Part of Jackson Atoll (Quirino Atoll).
Hoare Reef	Laurel	Above water only at low tide. Part of Jackson Atoll (Quirino Atoll).
Hopps Reef	Diego Silang	Above water only at low tide. Part of Southampton Reefs (Bonifacio Reefs).
Livock Reef	(NE part) Jacinto (SW part) Bonifacio	Above water only at low tide. Some rocks still visible at high tide. Part of Southampton Reefs (Bonifacio Reefs).
Loaita Nan	Kota Magbanua	Above water only at low tide. Part of Loaita Bank (Kota Bank).
Menzies Reef	Rajah Lakandula	Awash at low tide. Part of Loaita Bank (Kota Bank).
North Reef	Hilagang Peligro	Above water only at low tide. Part of North Danger Reef (Peligro Bank).
Petch Reef	Aquino	Above water only at low tide. Part of Jackson Atoll (Quirino Atoll).
Third Thomas Shoal	Payao	11°07′27.8″N 116°04′12.3″E - NE of Flat Island (Patag Island) A few rocks are permanently above sea level. Much of the reef is above water at low tide. Encloses a lagoon.
Whitsun Reef	Julian Felipe	The reef is V-shaped with an area of about 10 km2 (3.9 sq mi), above the water only during low tide. Part of Union Banks (Pagkakaisa Bank).

Claimed features by the Philippines but occupied by another country
The PRC, the ROC and Vietnam claim all of the Spratly Island Chain, including some features that are just 50 km from other countries like the Philippines and Malaysia. The Philippines have claims on parts of the area. Here are the islands claimed but are not occupied by the Philippines:
Int'l Name	Occupied by & Name	(Philippines) Philippine Name	Description
Taiping Island / Itu Aba	(Taiwan) 太平島 Tàipíng Dǎo	Ligaw	10°22′30″N 114°22′0″E - Part of Tizard Banks. The largest of the Spratly islands, located about 22 miles (35 km) south-southwest of Philippine-occupied Loaita (Kota) Island and about 6 miles (10 km) west of Vietnam-occupied Sand Cay. Covered with shrubs, coconut, mangroves, guano deposits and fringing reef. Pineapple was once cultivated here. In August 1993, plans were announced for a 2 km-long airstrip and a fishing port. The now only 1150-meters-long airstrip was completed in January 2008. Occupied since September 1956, four months after Filipino Tomas Cloma claimed the islands.
Cuarteron Reef	(China) 华阳礁 Huayang Jiao	Calderon	8°53′00″N 112°51′05″E - Part of London Reefs. Coral rocks only. Highest are 1.5 m high, on the north. Occupied by PRC since 1988.
Fiery Cross Reef / Northwest Investigator Reef	(China) 永暑礁 Yongshu Jiao	Kagitingan	9°37′N 112°58′E - West of Union Banks Rocks up to 1 m high. [5] says all below high tide, but guano deposits disagree. Occupied by PRC since 1988. "Marine observation station" built by PRC in 1988. Designated as PRC's main command headquarters in the South China Sea.
Gaven Reefs	(China) 南薰礁 Nanxun Jiao (Northern reef) / Xinan or Duolu Jiao (Southern reef)	Burgos	10°12′48″N 114°13′9″E - Part of Tizard Banks. A sand dune, 2 m high. Has fringing reef plus a reef 2 miles (3 km) to the south, both covered at high tide. Southern reef was occupied by PRC on 7/4/92. Occupied since 1988.
Hughes Reef	(China) 東門礁 Dongmen Jiao	Burunyugan 4	9°55′N 114°30′E - Part of Union Banks. Naturally above water only at low tide, but many rocks above water at high tide. Occupied since 1988.
Johnson South Reef	(China) 赤瓜礁 Chigua Jiao	Mabini	9.71389°N 114.286°E - Part of Union Banks. Contiguous with Vietnam-occupied Collins Reef which lies 4 miles (6 km) away northwest. Naturally above water only at low tide, but many rocks above water at high tide. Site of 1988 PRC/Vietnam clash. Occupied since 1988.
Mischief Reef	(China) 美济礁; Meiji Jiao	Panganiban	9°55′N 115°32′E - East of the centre of Dangerous Ground. Some rocks above water at low tide. Has a large lagoon. In February 1995, PRC had built a wooden complex on stilts here, starting its formal occupation of the feature. In 1999, the Philippines protested over the expanded structures claiming that it is a military outpost and it poses danger to Philippine security and national defense, being 130 miles (209 km) from Palawan. PRC claimed it was a shelter for fishermen.
Subi (Zhubi) Reef	(China) 渚碧礁 Zhubi Dao	Zamora	10°54′48″N 114°03′43″E - West of Thitu Reefs. Lies 16 miles (26 km) southwest of Philippine-occupied Thitu Island (Pagasa Island). Naturally above water only at low tide. Surrounds a lagoon. As of 2011, PRC has built a permanent reef fortress and supply platform that can house 160 troops.
Amboyna Cay	(Vietnam) Đảo An Bang	Datu Kalantiaw	07°51′N 112°55′E The thirteenth largest Spratly island. 2m high. Two parts: East part consists of sand and coral, west part is covered with guano. Has fringing reef. An obelisk, about 2.7 m high, stands on the SW corner. Little vegetation. Lighthouse operational since May 1995.
Namyit Island	(Vietnam) Đảo Nam Yết	Binago	The twelfth largest Spratly island. Covered with small trees, bushes and grass. Has a fringing reef and is inhabited by sea birds. The island is inhabited by an unknown number of Vietnamese soldiers and in the deep waters fronting the south side it is said that a submarine base is situated. Occupied since 1975.Part of Tizard Banks.
Sand Cay	(Vietnam) Đảo Sơn Ca	Bailan	The ninth largest Spratly island. Lies 6 miles (10 km) to the east of Taiwan-occupied Taiping Island. Covered with trees and bushes. Fringing reef partly above water at low tide. This feature is commonly confused with Sandy Cay. Occupied since 1974. Part of Tizard Banks.
Sin Cowe Island	(Vietnam) Đảo Sinh Tồn	Rurok	9°52′N 114°19′E The seventh largest. Has fringing reef which is above water at low tide. Occupied since 1974. Part of Union Banks.
Southwest Cay	(Vietnam) Đảo Song Tử Tây	Pugad	11°28′N 114°21′E The sixth largest Spratly island. Only 1.75 miles (2.82 km) from Northeast Cay and can be seen before the horizon. Previously a breeding place for birds and covered with trees and guano. Export of guano was once carried out "on a considerable scale." Fringing reef partly above water at high tide. Vietnam erected its first lighthouse in the Spratlys here in October 1993 and built an airstrip. Philippine military controlled the island before the early 1970s. South Vietnamese forces (Republic of Vietnam) invaded the island in 1975, when Filipino soldiers guarding the island attended the birthday party of their commanding officer based in the nearby Northeast Cay. A confirmed report came out that Vietnamese prostitutes were sent by Vietnamese officials to the birthday party, supposedly a sign of good brotherhood between the forces, but was actually used to lure the Filipino soldiers guarding the island. Filipino forces apparently planned on attacking the island, thus it would have led to a war, but Vietnamese forces were able to erect a huge garrison in the island within few weeks, forcing Filipino officials to abort the plan. Since then, more soldiers were assigned to Parola Island (North East Cay), to avoid it from happening again. Part of North Danger Reef.
Spratly Island / Storm Island	(Vietnam) Đảo Trường Sa	Lagos	8°38′N 114°25′E The fourth largest Spratly island. 2.5 m high, flat. Covered with bushes, grass, birds and guano. 5.5 m-high obelisk at southern tip. Has landing strip, and a fishing port. Fringing reef is above water at low tide. Some structures with soldiers stationed. Occupied since 1974.
Alison Reef	(Vietnam) Đá Tốc Tan	De Jesus	8°51′N 114°00′E Naturally above water only at low tide. Encloses a lagoon.
Barque Canada Reef / Lizzie Weber Reef	(Vietnam) Bãi Thuyền Chài	(Barque Canada Reef) Mascarado (Lizzie Weber Reef) Magsaysay	8°10′N 113°18′E Coral. Highest rocks are 4.5 m high, at SW end. Much of reef is above water at high tide. Some sandy patches. 18 miles (29 km) long. Its military structures have been upgraded. Occupied since 1987.
Central London Reef	(Vietnam) Đảo Trường Sa Đông	Gitnang Quezon	SW part is a sandbank which barely submerges at high tide. The rest is coral reef, awash, surrounding a lagoon. Occupied since 1978. Part of London Reefs.
Collins Reef / Johnson North Reef	(Vietnam) Đá Cô Lin	Roxas	Lies 8 miles (13 km) southwest of Vietnam-occupied Sin Cowe Island. Connected to Johnson South Reef. A "coral dune" is located at the southeast corner, above the high tide line. Part of Union Banks.
Cornwallis South Reef	(Vietnam) Đá Núi Le	Osmeña	Naturally above water only at low tide. Encloses a lagoon. Occupied since 1988.
Discovery Great Reef	(Vietnam) Đá Lớn	Paredes	Several rocks are above water at high tide. Most of reef is above water at low tide. Has lagoon. Occupied since 1988.
East London Reef	(Vietnam) Đá Đông	Silangang Quezon	Rocks up to 1 m high. Encloses a lagoon. Occupied since 1988. Part of London Reefs.
Grierson Reef	(Vietnam) Đảo Sinh Tồn Đông	Burunyugan 14	A sand cay with fringing reef. (Despite some ambiguity in various references, this is NOT Sin Cowe East Island.) Its sand bar area is about 12 hectares. Part of Union Banks.
Lan(d)sdowne Reef	(Vietnam) Đá Len Đao	Burunyugan 8	Sand dune, with fringing reef. Part of Union Banks.
Pearson Reef	(Vietnam) Đảo Phan Vinh	Hizon	Two sand "cays", 2 m and 1 m high, lie on the edges of a lagoon. Parts of the surrounding reef are above water at high tide. Occupied since 1988.
Petley Reef	(Vietnam) Đá Núi Thị	Juan Luna	Naturally above water only at low tide, some small rocks might stand above high water. Occupied since 1988. Part of Tizard Banks.
Pigeon Reef / Tennent Reef	(Vietnam) Đá Tiên Nữ	Lopez-Jaena	Numerous rocks are naturally above the high tide line. Encloses a lagoon. Occupied since 1988.
South Reef	(Vietnam) Đá Nam	Timog	Lies about 2.5 miles (4 km) southwest of Vietnam-occupied Southwest Cay. A tiny cay appears atop this reef on the most detailed map available. On the southwest end of North Danger Reef. Fringing reef is above water at low tide. Occupied since 1988. Part of North Danger Reef.
West London Reef	(Vietnam) Đá Tây	Kanlurang Quezon	East part is sand "cay", 0.6 m high. West part is coral reef which is above water only at low tide. Between them is a lagoon. Vietnam erected a lighthouse here in May or June 1994. Part of London Reefs.
Swallow Reef/ Island	(Malaysia) Terumbu Layang Layang	Celerio	The eleventh largest Spratly island. Treeless cay and rocks up to 3 m high surround a lagoon. Malaysia has drawn territorial seas around this and Amboyna Cay. Some 70 plus soldiers stationed at Royal Malaysian Navy offshore EEZ station "Lima". Has a 1.4 km airstrip, jetty and dive resort. Occupied since 1983.
Ardasier Reef	(Malaysia) Terumbu Ubi	Antonio Luna	07°38′N 113°56′E Naturally above water only at low tide. Encloses a lagoon. Has a few sandy patches. Several soldiers stationed at Royal Malaysian Navy offshore EEZ station "Uniform". Occupied since 1986.
Dallas Reef	(Malaysia) Terumbu Laya	Rajah Matanda	Naturally above water only at low tide. Encloses a lagoon. Several soldiers stationed. Malaysia is also using this reef for tourism.
Erica Reef / Enloa Reef	(Malaysia) Terumbu Siput	Gabriela Silang	Above water only at low tide. Some isolated rocks on the eastern edge stand above high water. Several soldiers stationed at Royal Malaysian Navy offshore EEZ station "Sierra". Occupied since 1999.
Investigator Shoal	(Malaysia) Terumbu Peninjau	Pawikan	Above water only at low tide. Some large rocks at the western end are visible at high water. Encloses a lagoon. Several soldiers stationed at Royal Malaysian Navy offshore EEZ station "Papa". Occupied since 1999.
Mariveles Reef	(Malaysia) Terumbu Mantanani	Mariveles	A sand cay, 1.5–2 m high, surrounded by two lagoons, parts of which are above water at high tide. Several soldiers stationed at Royal Malaysian Navy offshore EEZ station "Mike". Occupied since 1986.

== History ==
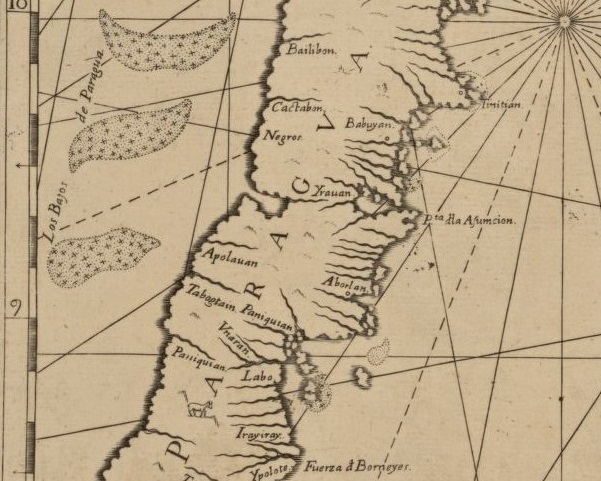
Los Bajos de Paragua as shown on the 1734 Murillo Velarde map. Some shoals in the Spratlys were then considered part of Palawan

The 1734 Carta Hydrographica y Chorographica de las Yslas Filipinas, also known as the Murillo Velarde map

There are records of various cultures in the region passing through the islands for trade. Permanent populations and military stations only became apparent in the 20th century.

In 1734, the Spanish colonial government in the Philippines published the first edition of the Velarde map, which details territories under full sovereign control of Spanish Philippines, including Scarborough Shoal (called Panacot in the indigenous language in the map) and Kalayaan or Spratly Islands (referred in the map as Los Bajos de Paragua), and is the earliest map to showcase the sovereignty of a nation over Scarborough Shoal and the Spratly Islands. The official territories of the Philippines was again published in the 1808 Carita General del Archipelago Filipino and again in the 1875 Carita General del Archipelago Filipino, which continued to include the Kalayaan islands.

After the Spanish-American War, Spain lost and ceded the territory of the Philippines to the United States through the 1898 Treaty of Paris. The 1898 Treaty of Paris created a treaty line, where Scarborough Shoal, the Kalayaan or Spratly Islands, and parts of Tawi-tawi continued to be under Spanish sovereignty. This led to talks between Spain and the United States, which ended upon the signing of the 1900 Treaty of Washington, which rectified retroactively the 1898 Treaty of Paris. Under the 1900 Treaty of Washington, "all islands belonging to the Philippine Archipelago, lying outside the lines described in Article III" were also ceded to the United States as part of the territory of the Philippines, where Scarborough Shoal, the Kalayaan or Spratly Islands, and the rest of Tawi-tawi was included. From 1899 to 1902, the United States war department in the territory of the Philippines republished and reissued four times the 1875 Carita General del Archipelago Filipino with the addition of military telegraph lines, military cable lines, eastern cable company lines, and military department boundaries. The official map of the entire Philippine territory under Spanish rule was effectively adopted as the entire Philippine territory under American rule. During the 1928 Islas Palmas international case, the United States, as representative of the territory of the Philippines, reiterated in a court memorandum that the 1875 Carta General del Archipielago Filipino "is both an American official and a Spanish official map" of Philippine territory, bounding the United States on its recognition of the Scarborough Shoal and the Kalayaan or Spratly Islands as Philippine territory. In 1930, the United States and the United Kingdom signed a treaty, where the United Kingdom recognized the territory of Philippines which included Scarborough Shoal and the Kalayaan or Spratlys, effectively bounding the United Kingdom's successor countries as well, such as Malaysia and Brunei.

Under the Commonwealth of the Philippines, the 1935 Constitution was adopted, reiterating the national territory of the Philippines, which included Scarborough Shoal and the Kalayaan or Spratly Islands. After regaining independence in 1946, the Philippines again asserted its claims to the Spratly islands. The Americans at the time discouraged the Philippines to avoid conflict with the Chinese government of Chiang Kai-shek, who was an ally of the United States. In 1946, Vice President Elpidio Quirino reiterated the "New Southern Islands", the forerunner name for Kalayaan, as part of the Philippines.

=== Municipality of Kalayaan ===
The Philippine assertion of sovereignty over the Spratly Islands began in May 1956, when Tomas Cloma, owner of a Philippine fishing vessel company, and director of the Philippine Maritime Institute, declared the founding of the new municipality called in Tagalog: Kalayaan, lit. 'Freedom'.

He "found" the islands while he, with his brothers and 40 crew, were "adventuring" in the South China Sea. Observing that there was no human settlement, nor national flag, present on them, he decided to establish the Kalayaan municipality. He posted a document in English, entitled Notice to the Whole World, on all features he claimed. His claim comprises about fifty features among the Spratly group. In September 1956, after the Republic of China occupied the largest island, Ligao Island (Itu Aba), Cloma decided to cede and sell all the territories of his state to the Philippines for one peso (US$0.50 of the time). Cloma wrote to Carlos Garcia, then Philippine Vice President and Foreign Minister, asserting that his claim was based on "discovery and occupation". Garcia replied that judging from the point of "occupation" and "proximity", there were no reasons for these islands and reefs not to be under Philippine jurisdiction.

The Philippine government incorporated the Kalayaan group into Palawan Province as a municipality in April 1972, and claimed in 1974 that "Its location rendered it strategically important to Philippine national security". In 1978, the Philippine Presidential Decree No. 1599 was based on the fact that Kalayaan is within the Philippine 200-mile exclusive economic zone (EEZ). The Philippine claim extends over an area of 70,150 sq. nm.

=== Philippine occupation ===
The Philippines sent troops to the Spratly group for the first time in 1968. It prioritized large islands such as Pagasa (Thitu Island), Likas (West York Island), Parola (Northeast Cay), Kota (Loaita Island), Lawak (Nanshan Island), and Pugad (Southwest Cay). Two small islands, Patag (Flat Island) and Panata (Loaita Cay), were also occupied.

To further the claim of the Philippines on the island group, the late President Ferdinand Marcos, on June 11, 1978, formally annexed the Kalayaan Islands by virtue of Presidential Decree No.1596.

Several years after the Philippines had occupied its latest island, it became apparent that Vietnam was not content in only occupying islands; Vietnam started occupying many reefs. By 2008, Vietnam had about 30 non-island occupied features. Some of these are very close to Philippine-occupied islands. Due to the pressure of losing fishing area in South China Sea, the Philippines decided to occupy at least two reefs: Rizal (Commodore Reef) and Balagtas (Irving Reef). Rizal is not in the northeast region; it is near many Vietnamese and Malaysian occupied reefs, thus serving as a good sentry against eastward expansion of Vietnam and northward expansion of Malaysia (see the map below). Unlike Rizal, Balagtas lies at the center of the northeast region.

=== Southwest Cay invasion ===
Southwest Cay Invasion
Date	1975
Location	Southwest Cay
Result	Vietnamese Capture of Southwest Cay

Belligerents
Philippines	South Vietnam

Southwest Cay, also known in the Philippines as Pugad Island (Tagalog: Pulo ng Pugad); Vietnamese: Đảo Song Tử Tây; Mandarin Chinese: 南子島/南子岛; pinyin: Nánzi Dǎo, is an island in the North Danger Reef of the Spratly Islands. It was occupied by Philippine forces up to 1975, when South Vietnam forces were able to invade and occupy the island.

Southwest Cay is in the northern western corner of the Spratly Islands. It is within the North Danger Reef, which also contains the Philippine-occupied Northeast Cay (Parola Island), the Vietnamese-occupied South Reef and the unoccupied North Reef. Southwest and Northeast Cays are just 1.75 miles (2.82 km) from each other; each island can actually see the other within their respective horizons.

The "invasion" (occupation of the island) took place when all of the Philippine soldiers guarding the island of Pugad (Southwest Cay) left to attend to the birthday party of their commanding officer, who was based on the neighbouring Parola Island (Northeast Cay). The storm that day is also believed to have persuaded all of the soldiers to regroup temporarily on Parola island. A report also came out saying that South Vietnamese officials managed to send Vietnamese prostitutes to the birthday party to lure the Filipino soldiers guarding Pugad Island. The "gift" was said to be a "present" to the Philippine commander for his birthday, and as a move by South Vietnamese forces to befriend all Filipino soldiers guarding the Spratlys. Philippine soldiers did not expect that South Vietnam would resort to foul play since both the Philippines and South Vietnam, together with the United States, were allies in the Vietnam War. This tactic is believed to be the reason why South Vietnamese forces knew that the Filipino soldiers had left the island, an action that would usually be kept confidential.

After the party, and when the weather cleared, the returning soldiers were surprised to find that there was a company of South Vietnamese soldiers on the island. The South Vietnamese flag had replaced the Philippine flag flying on the pole erected by the Philippine soldiers. They returned to Parola immediately for fear that Parola would be the next target. After higher-ups of the Philippines were informed about the situation, they instructed the troops based in Parola and Pagasa to stay on red alert status. The following morning, the only thing the Filipino soldiers could do on Parola was to "curse" while the South Vietnamese soldiers sang their national anthem. Philippine Malacañang officials, who did not want to compromise the alliance while the Vietnam War was still being fought, decided to remain silent.

A few months later, the then recently formed unified Vietnam (after North Vietnam successfully invaded South Vietnam) decided to launch a campaign to remove all remaining South Vietnamese troops in the Spratlys and establish military control among the features. It was reported that dozens of South Vietnamese soldiers on Pugad Island swam all the way to Parola just to avoid being captured by North Vietnamese forces. It was then when Malacañang officials, headed by President Ferdinand Marcos, discussed how the Philippines could reclaim the island. It had been apparent that most of the officials (who treated the Vietnamese communists as a threat to the Philippine national security) wanted to attack Pugad to reclaim it. However, after an intelligence report stated that the unified Vietnam had already built a huge concrete garrison within a few weeks, the officials dropped the plan and tried to resolve the issue diplomatically. This approach eventually died, and Pugad was still a Vietnamese-occupied island as of March 2008. This incident was reported in interviews with soldiers involved in an episode of the now defunct Magandang Gabi Bayan TV program. (Eng.: Good Evening Nation) (MGB) of ABS-CBN.

=== Expansion of other claimants ===
By the end of the 1970s, the Philippines had occupied a total of eight islands and two reefs. These features, excluding Southwest Cay, are still occupied by the Philippines today. The Philippines has never occupied another feature after the 1970s until 1999. While other countries occupied most of the features they control now during that period, the Philippines has maintained not to occupy any features further. It is attributed to the Philippines' initiation for the cooperative development of the area. The Philippines, Vietnam and Malaysia, along with other ASEAN countries who can serve as investors, were already drawing a plan on a wide exploitation of the Spratly group in the early 1980s when suddenly China became interested in the area. China began occupying features by mid-1980s causing the ASEAN plan to halt. The most controversial occupation of China is the Panganiban Reef (Mischief Reef) in 1995 (See Mischief Reef for further discussion).

In 1999, Malaysia occupied Gabriela Silang Reef (Erica Reef) and Pawikan Reef (Investigator Shoal), causing the Philippines to protest further. Due to this pressure, with China's Mischief Reef just 130 miles (210 km) off Palawan and Vietnam's Pigeon Reef and Malaysia's Investigator Shoal just 150 miles (240 km) off Palawan, the Philippines decided to occupy Ayungin Reef (Second Thomas Reef) in 1999. No structure is built on the reef. Soldiers stationed there take shelter at BRP Sierra Madre, a Philippine naval ship that was purposely run aground in the reef shortly before the Philippines decided to occupy it. Together with Rizal Reef (Commodore Reef), Ayungin Reef can give the Philippines a sentry advantage in stopping other countries' occupation of features nearest to the Philippines (see map below).

China has also been reported seeking to establish another forward outpost, past Mischief Reef and closer to Palawan. Twice since 1998, it planted buoys on Sabina Shoal, just 82 miles (132 km) off Palawan. Philippine Air Force planes have blasted the buoys out of the water.

China occupied only eight features. However, these features were strategic points in the area, making China able to assert its exploitation rights for the whole area. In contrast, the Philippines and Malaysia are limited to particular regions in the area, making these two countries incapable of contesting exploitation rights in other regions. In his essay contributed for TIME Asia in 1999, Professor Alex Magno of University of the Philippines pointed out that China is the main aggressor in the Spratly dispute. Magno, in particular, called on ASEAN to be watchful of China's actions in the South China Sea (Magno said it is very unlucky for ASEAN that the sea where the Spratly group lies is named South China Sea, named after China). Being one of the major consumers of Chinese goods and being adjacent to China itself, the ASEAN bloc is capable of crippling the Chinese economy, both through product boycotts and the possibility of peace instability. Even non-Spratly claiming ASEAN nations—Singapore, Indonesia, Laos, Cambodia, Thailand and Myanmar—are more supportive to the Vietnamese, Philippine, Malaysian and Bruneian claims than the Chinese claim. However, China today is beginning to engage itself in joint efforts to exploit the area. In particular, China, the Philippines, and Vietnam are already working on their second phase of drawing a joint exploitation plan.

In November 2002 the Declaration on the Conduct of Parties in the South China Sea was signed in an effort to ease tensions between the claimants. It has been described as stipulating "that all nations claiming sovereignty over the Spratly Islands shall commit to the status quo and shall not erect any new structure in the disputed regions of Spratly, Paracel Islands and Scarborough Shoal." The actual language of the declaration, however, mentions neither "status quo" nor the erection of structures.

=== JMSU controversy ===
The Joint Marine Seismic Undertaking (JMSU) is a tripartite agreement between the Philippines, China and Vietnam to conduct seismic exploration in an area spanning 142,886 square kilometers west of Palawan, all of which are within Philippine territories (as defined by EEZ of UNCLOS and does not necessarily mean as accepted by China and Vietnam). More specifically it is an agreement between Philippine National Oil Company -Exploration Corporation (PNOC-EC), China National Offshore Oil Corporation (CNOOC) and Vietnam Oil and Gas Corporation (PetroVietnam), that was signed in September 2004 and took effect in July 2005. JMSU has already finished the first phase of the seismic exploration which lasted from September 1 to November 16, 2006, covering 11,000 line kilometers. A Chinese vessel conducted the survey, Vietnam processed the data gathered and this was interpreted by PNOC-EC in Manila. The second phase started in October 2007, covering 11,800 line kilometers. It was supposedly to end January 2008.

A controversy broke out when Barry Wain, a researcher in the Institute for Southeast Asian Studies in Singapore, wrote an article in the January–February 2008 issue of the Hong-Kong-based Far Eastern Economic Review saying that "it was largely a sellout on the part of the Philippines". Wain wrote:

The Philippines ... has made breathtaking concessions in agreeing to the area for study, including parts of its own continental shelf not even claimed by China and Vietnam.

Regarding the area of exploration he stated:

[The area] thrusts into the Spratlys and abuts Malampaya, a Philippine producing gas field. About one-sixth of the entire area, closest to the Philippine coastline, is outside the claims by China and Vietnam.

This prompted the Philippine Senate and House of Representatives (HR) to seek separate inquiries into the said agreement. Several senators alleged that "the agreement weakens the government's position in its claim over the disputed islands." Also, some alleged that it is a "precondition" set by China in exchange of some loan agreements. After signing the agreement, China has committed Philippines US$2 billion a year in loans. President Gloria Macapagal-Arroyo is suspected by some legislators to be hiding the facts about the agreement. Malacañang rebuts by saying that the agreement is not hidden and is actually posted in a government website. However, legislators are not convinced. They say Malacañang intentionally did not disseminate the right amount of information about the agreement including a detailed map which was only made available by Malacañang few days after the controversy broke out to a limited number of people. China denied the allegations connecting the deal with the loans.

Another puzzle some legislators pointed out is the continued delay in the passage of the bill setting the Philippines' archipelagic baselines. The bill is needed to be passed before the middle of 2009 to beat the deadline set by the United Nations for the measures defining countries' territorial claims. The bill has just passed its second reading and the third and final reading is not yet started. Furthermore, the HR committee on foreign affairs received a message from Department of Foreign Affairs (DFA) saying that the bill should not be passed because it is in conflict with some international agreements the government had entered to.

The Philippine Senate, which is an opposition-majority block, believes that the President can be impeached if she was proven to have forsaken the national interests of the Philippines. Charges can include treason, betrayal of public trust, violation of the constitution and other charges related to other anomalies the Arroyo is currently facing. The Philippine Senate believes that the agreement should have gone through them for ratification before it could take effect.

Opposition legislators also say that the agreement is a betrayal to the 10-member ASEAN. After ASEAN, as a group, confronted China 10 years ago regarding the latter's apparent of hegemonic motive in South China Sea, the legislators said that Philippines had made an agreement with China on its own without even consulting other ASEAN states. Vietnam is said to have initially resisted joining the agreement but was eventually "forced" to join to protect its own interest after Philippines gave China a 100% OK.

The alleged betrayal also extends up to the signing of the Code of Conduct in 2002. The legislators said that after convincing the other ASEAN states to force China sign the Declaration, which China initially resisted, the Philippines had made an agreement which will clearly affect the fates of other ASEAN states without even consulting them. The legislators also say that Arroyo became too soft regarding China's claim over the Spratlys, while all other ASEAN states are still strongly rejecting it.

Malacañang, on the other hand, continues to stress that there is nothing wrong with the agreement and that it doesn't go against the constitution. They contend that the agreement is for purely seismic activities only, without any actual exploitation activities, thus there is no need for a Senate ratification. Supporters of the agreement contend that the nature of the activity is a scientific one which helps in easing the tensions among the three involved nations. They also say that the JMSU is not different from other agreements the Philippines had made in the past with Australia and Norway regarding the oil in the Spratlys. Critics, on the other hand, pointed that Australia and Norway are in a different situation since neither of these countries is a claimant to the Spratlys.

Because of the controversy, some Philippine legislators were alarmed by the increasing Chinese influence in the Philippines which is in parallel with the growing influence of China in other countries, especially in Africa. Reports came out saying that the United States was "pissed off" by the Philippines' deal with China, signifying a war of the US and China for dominance in the ASEAN region. The US embassy in Manila denied the reports.

=== Current status ===
On 2018, the Philippine Coast Guard constructed 5 lighthouses in the area.

Around 2018–19, Philippines started to build a beach ramp, enabling the delivery of construction equipment for to work on the construction, rehabilitation and repairs of the Rancudo Airfield airstrip, soldiers' barracks, conventional and renewable power generators, desalination facilities, lighthouses, sewage disposal system, shelters and storage facilities for civilian fishermen.

By May 2020, the beaching ramp was completed and Filipino Naval ship BRP Ivatan landed on the ramp. Work on the port and upgrades to the island's airstrip progressed.

== Activities and policies ==
=== Republic Act 9522 ===
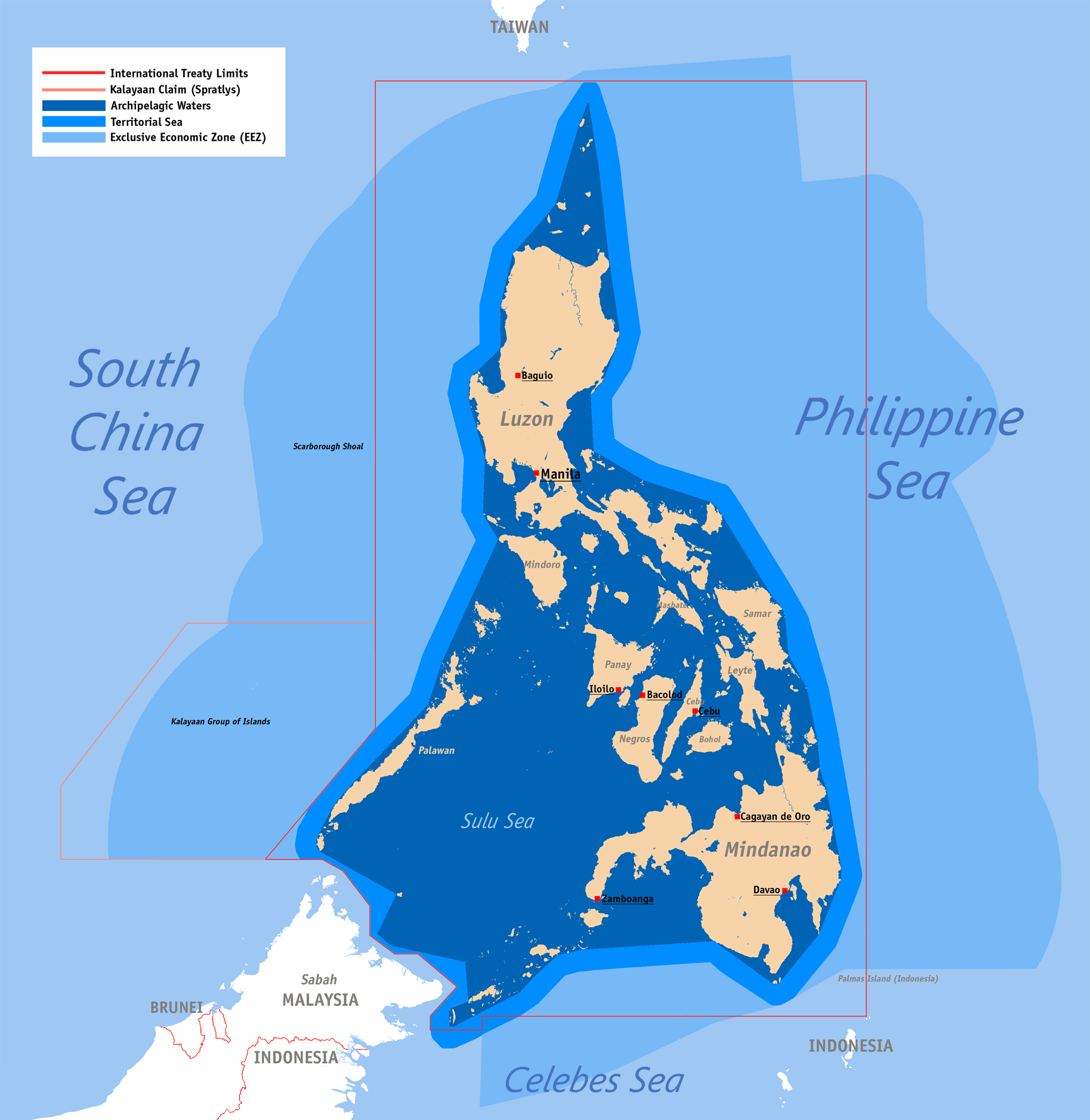
Territorial map of the Philippines, showing internal waters, territorial sea, disputed territory, international treaty limits and exclusive economic zone.

Republic Act 9522, was passed by the Congress which defined the archipelagic baselines of the Philippines, claimed sovereignty over the Kalayaan Island Group and the Scarborough Shoal under Section 2, sub-paragraph A which described the territory as a "Regime of Islands"—a concept defined in the United Nation Convention on Law of the Sea for similar bodies of land.

=== 2016 PCA Tribunal ruling ===
In January 2013, the Philippines formally initiated arbitration proceedings against China's claim on the territories within the "nine-dash line" that includes Spratly Islands, which it said is "unlawful" under the United Nations Convention on the Law of the Sea (UNCLOS) convention. An arbitration tribunal was constituted under Annex VII of UNCLOS and it was decided in July 2013 that the Permanent Court of Arbitration (PCA) would function as registry and provide administrative duties in the proceedings.

On July 12, 2016, the arbitrators of the tribunal of PCA agreed unanimiously with the Philippines. They concluded in the award that there was no evidence that China had historically exercised exclusive control over the waters or resources, hence there was "no legal basis for China to claim historic rights" over the nine-dash line. Accordingly, the PCA tribunal decision is ruled as final and non-appealable by either countries. The tribunal also criticized China's land reclamation projects and its construction of artificial islands in the Spratly Islands, saying that it had caused "severe harm to the coral reef environment". It also characterized Taiping Island and other features of the Spratly Islands as "rocks" under UNCLOS, and therefore are not entitled to a 200 nautical mile exclusive economic zone. China however rejected the ruling, calling it "ill-founded". Taiwan, which currently administers Taiping Island, the largest of the Spratly Islands, also rejected the ruling.

=== Republic Act 12064 ===
In 2024, Republic Act No. 12064, was enacted into law, which define the Philippine Maritime Zones. It clarifies the maritime zones of the Philippines, including those surrounding the Kalayaan Island Group in the West Philippine Sea shall have a territorial sea of 12 nautical miles from its baselines.

=== Executive Order No. 111, s. 2026 ===
In 2026, President Bongbong Marcos issued the Executive Order No. 111, s. 2026, which is the adoption of a standard set of Philippine names for the 131 features of the Kalayaan Island Group and directing the National Mapping and Resource Information Authority to produce and publish updated charts and maps reflecting the names set in the issuance.

=== Guarding activity ===
The Philippines has stationed soldiers in its occupied islands and reefs. One to three small structures were built in Likas, Parola, Kota, Lawak and Rizal Reef to house soldiers. The only island with a significant number of structures is Pagasa (see Pagasa Island subsection in this article), the only Philippine-occupied island to have a civilian population. The Philippines has not built any structure on Ayungin and Balagtas Reefs. A Philippine Navy ship, BRP Sierra Madre, which ran aground on Ayungin Reef in 1999, serves as a shelter and observation post for soldiers stationed here. In Balagtas Reef, the Philippine Navy's ships take alternate shifts in guarding the reef and the whole area encompassing all other Philippine-occupied islands. The two other Philippine-occupied islands, Patag and Panata, are each less than a hectare in area. Fortunately for the Philippines, these two tiny islands are each near a large Philippine-occupied island. Patag Island is just 6 miles (9.7 km) from Lawak Island and Panata Island is just 8 miles (13 km) from Kota Island. Lawak and Kota are 7.93 and 6.45 hectares in area respectively. This situation enables the Philippines to guard the small islands effectively without having to build any structures, or to station soldiers permanently to the two tiny islands. A 10 metres (33 ft) watchtower is present on each of the large islands to effectively see the tiny islands within the horizon. In addition, Philippine Navy vessels and reconnaissance planes are always present in the area to monitor movements of foreign countries.

The Philippines in the Spratly group, like any other country, reserves the right to fire upon any vessel of other countries found within the horizon of its occupied features. For instance, the Smart Communications engineering team sent to install a communication system in Pagasa Island in 2005 was forced to seek temporary refuge in BRP Sierra Madre due to inclement weather. Since their boat did not display a Philippine flag, the marines stationed at BRP Sierra Madre considered sinking the boat. Fortunately for the engineering team, the marines did not carry out their plan as they suspected that the boat was crewed by Filipinos and that it was seeking refuge because of the storm.

A Philippine Star editorial cartoon depicting ROC's President Chen Shui-bian (holding a "Tai-ping" sign) successfully hitting a Filipino (holding a "Ligao" sign) with a rock. Tai-ping is the ROC's name for Itu Aba Island, where President Chen visited in February 2008. The cartoon is a commentary on the Philippines' inability to enforce its claim in the Spratlys due, to its lagging military capabilities. Ligao is the Philippine name for the island.

A documentary produced by i-Witness of GMA 7, a local TV network, entitled Bantay ng Kalayaan (lit. Guards of Kalayaan), featured the lives of soldiers guarding the islands of Patag and Lawak Islands. As the two islands are near each other, they are managed as a single unit. In the documentary, four enlisted soldiers are stationed there. A simple wooden structure on Lawak, the larger of the two islands, serves as their shelter. They have two dogs as mascots. Basketball serves as a pastime to relieve boredom. Every month, a Navy vessel arrives on a supply run and to replace one or two soldiers. Their weapons include M16 rifles and a few grenades. The soldiers themselves believe that they will never be able to protect the islands if other countries attacked them. However, all of them agree that the islands should be guarded since it is of national importance. Occasionally, some Filipino fishermen who happen to see the islands, visit for a few minutes and engage the soldiers in conversation. These fishermen would commend the soldiers, a morale-booster. Before leaving, the fishermen would leave the soldiers a portion of their catch.

Among the claimant nations, the Philippines is considered the weakest in terms of military capability. Its defense program in the Spratlys only includes several old naval vessels, most of which are used assets sourced from the US military. Its air assets lean more toward surveillance types rather than fighters. A former Armed Forces chief of the Philippines, General Hermogenes Esperon Jr., expressed doubts that the Philippines can win a war with other claimants. However, he said that this will not hinder the Philippine's soldiers from defending the islands. "We may not have the chance, but that does not mean that soldiers are not willing to fight for the country," he said. He stated that despite limited firepower, Filipino troops are ready for "hand-to-hand" combat.

After the signing of the Code of Conduct between claimant nations in November 2002, the Philippines have maintained a total of 450 soldiers stationed in all of the features it occupies. About 40 of those are in Pagasa Island. The remainder are divided among the remaining features. These exclude the one to two policemen and several village guards or barangay tanods which are unarmed and are considered as civilians of Pagasa island. These also exclude naval personnel aboard Philippine Navy and Philippine Coast Guard vessels and pilots of the Philippine Air Force's jets which regularly patrol the area.

=== Balikatan exercises ===
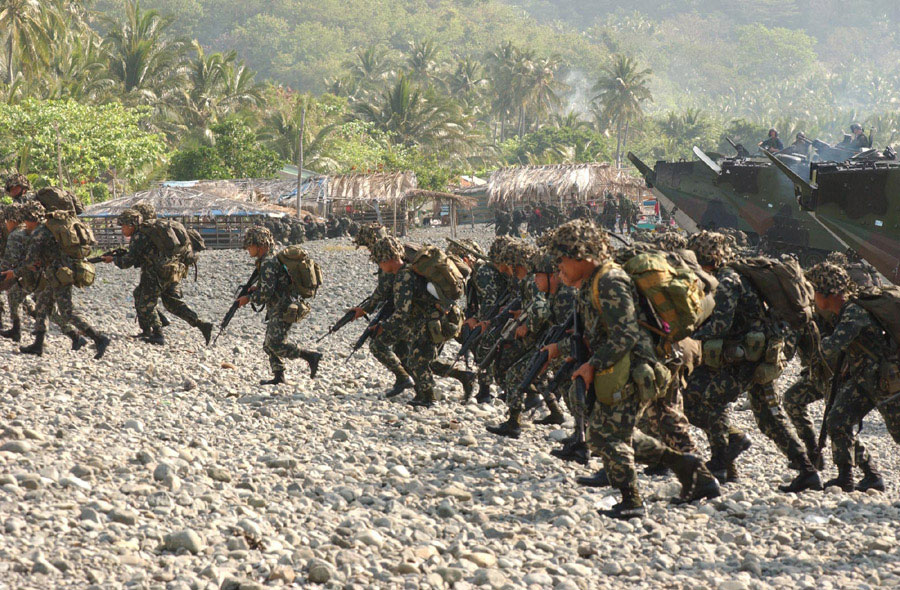
US and Filipino soldiers on a joint amphibious assault exercise last 2004 in Palawan, only a few miles east of the Spratly Islands.

The Balikatan Exercises have been part of Operation Enduring Freedom - Philippines (OEF-P) which is in turn part of Operation Enduring Freedom and the U.S. Global War on Terrorism. Since 2001, United States and Philippines have held joint military exercises in different parts of the Philippines. However, some analysts see this agreement as a move of the Philippines in its desperate quest to protect its claimed territories. During the 1970s and 1980s, the Soviets who have bases in Vietnam and the United States which has bases in the Philippines have maintained a balance of power in the Spratly region. After the collapse of the USSR and the departure of United States forces from the Philippines in 1991, most claimants, especially China, have aggressively taken actions occupying features and building more structures. In 2001, two years after China's building of additional structures in Mischief Reef that caused a news panic in Manila, the Visiting Forces Agreement was ratified by both United States and the Philippines. Since then, a joint military exercise is always held annually.

Many of the war games involved amphibious assault exercises. Some of these amphibious assault exercises were held in Palawan which lies near the Spratlys. Analysts say Philippines does not need amphibious assault in jungle warfare with Philippines' secessionist groups. China has protested past Balikatan exercises that were held near the Spratlys.

The Philippines has invoked its mutual defense treaty with the US to obtain US assistance in repelling Chinese forces from islands claimed by the Philippines. Signed in 1951, the treaty stipulates the two countries to defend each other in case of an attack from an external party. However, US does not include the Spratly Islands in its understanding of Philippine territory. Instead, the US limited itself in continuously supporting the Philippine defense programs with military and intelligence aid and training, and a variety of diplomatic measures aimed at sending a "strong message" to Beijing. Such "strong messages" and the ASEAN intervention are believed to have calmed China's previously aggressive drive in the Spratly region.

=== Grounded ships ===
China has accused the Philippines of intentionally grounding two naval vessels in the Spratly group to advance an occupation. The two ships, the BRP Sierra Madre and BRP Benquet, were grounded on Ayungin (Second Thomas) Reef and Panatag (Scarborough) Shoal during 1999. The Philippines decided to occupy Ayungin Reef following Malaysia's sudden occupation of Erica Reef and Investigator Shoal during the same year.

China then urged the Philippines to remove the grounded ships and the Philippines immediately replied that it would do so. However, the Philippines only removed BRP Benquet from Scarborough Shoal shortly before the official visit of Chinese Premier Zhu Rongji to Manila. After the Philippines removed BRP Benguet she went aground again on Pagasa Island in 2004, but was removed again and still serves the Philippine Navy today.

=== Pag-asa Island ===
As of 2008, the only Philippine-occupied Spratly island to have many structures is Pagasa (Thitu) Island, the lone barangay of Municipality of Kalayaan, Palawan. All Philippine-occupied Spratly islands are integrated as one municipality to the province of Palawan. Cities and municipalities in the Philippines are divided into smaller political units called barangays. However, because Pagasa is currently the only civilian-inhabited island, Kalayaan is the only municipality in the Philippines to have a single barangay and that is Pagasa. Pagasa has about 300 civilian residents and 40 soldiers. The civilian population is always less than 200 at a time since other Kalayaan residents have businesses to attend to on the Palawan mainland. The population is regulated to protect the island's environment, to avoid short supplies of commodities and to conserve land space. Pagasa is only 37 hectares and can only accommodate a maximum of 500 people at a time. Most of the civilian population consists of poor Filipinos who were convinced by Mayor Mantes to settle in the islands since 2002. Before, Pagasa Island barely had a civilian population even though Kalayaan was already an established municipality. The settlers are provided a means of livelihood by the government. Most of them are involved in fishing and other sea-related crafts. To make some additions to their supplies which are provided by a naval ship which visits once a month, the settlers also raise pigs, goats and chickens and plant some crops in an allotted space.

Because of its thriving civilian community, the only one in the Spratly group, Pagasa has many structures compared to other Philippine-occupied islands. These include the municipal multi-purpose hall, a police station, a school and clinic, a military outpost, a water treatment plant, a deep well, a marina, a 1.26 km airstrip, a commercial communications tower, power generator, houses of civilian families, pig barns and goat and poultry houses. However, the number and size of Pagasa's structures are still relatively few and small compared to structures of other countries' occupied islands. One unique feature of Pagasa Island is its 1.26 kilometres (1,378 yd) unconcretized airstrip. Aerial photos of Pagasa Island show that a rectangular portion of the coral base around Pagasa is reclaimed to serve as an extension of the airstrip. Pagasa's airstrip is the longest airstrip in the Spratly group, followed by Taiwan's Itu Aba (Ligao) Island's 1.150 kilometres (1,258 yd) airstrip (completed in January 2008), Malaysia's Swallow Reef's 1.067 kilometres (1,167 yd) airstrip and Vietnam's Spratly (proper) (Lagos) Island's 610 metres (667 yd) airstrip. Pagasa's airstrip can accommodate Philippine Air Force (PAF) fighter jets and even the huge C-130 cargo planes. Right now, numerous plans are proposed for Pagasa. One plan is construction of a hangar beside the airstrip to house more surveillance and fighter jets of the PAF. Another plan is to concretize the airstrip to avoid rough landings of planes.

For the Philippine Navy, they are proposing making a causeway that leads all the way to a deep water region where naval vessels can dock. Pagasa island is completely surrounded by its wide coral base making it hard for naval vessels to get near the island. Actually, one naval vessel, the BRP Benguet, attempted to dock near the island in 2004 but it was damaged and went aground. Up to this day, the damaged ship is still there. The Philippine government currently has no resources to move the damaged ship. And in 2001, civilian Filipinos who first settled on the island had needed to make numerous boat trips between the coast and the ship to move their belongings and properties. The pigs they have carried to the island were actually thrown in the water. The pigs float in water and they instinctively swim to the nearest land they can see.

Kalayaan residents have also erected an imposing bust of Tomas Cloma on the island as a tribute to Kalayaan's founder.

The Kalayaan residents (led by their mayor) are proposing to have the island developed for tourism. The island has a white beach; trees and birds are abundant. It has good diving spots too. An AFP military chief said that the army together with its navy would help bring more tourists to the white sands and pristine waters of Pagasa Island starting April 2008. In addition, there have been plans of building stilt cottages in Pagasa Island, like the ones in El Nido and Puerto Princesa in Palawan. Several housing units were already built to accommodate tourists. One to two commercial flights between Pagasa and Puerto Princesa City are available weekly for tourists.

On June 9, 2020, the Department of National Defense led the inauguration of a beaching ramp on Pag-asa Island (Thitu) which was finally completed after three years. The facility enabled to bring in more materials and equipment to repair and maintain the airstrip and building of other facilities. Also, Department of Transportation (DOTR) confirmed that the new seaport and sheltered port in the Thithu island is completed and ready to operate by June 12.

As of May 2021, the Philippine Coast Guard plans to upgrade its coast guard station Kalayaan on the island to boost monitoring of incursions and maritime safety and search and rescue.

On June 12, 2021, The National Power Corporation switched on its P33 million Kalayaan Diesel Power Plant project that covered the supply, delivery and installation of the 300 kilowatt diesel generating sets, a 13.8-kilovolt (kV) distribution line and fuel oil storage tanks, providing round-the-clock power to the facilities on the island.

=== Other islands and reefs ===
Parola, Likas, Kota and Lawak Islands are expected to be populated within the following next two decades. However, the latter two islands may take a longer time to be populated because they are less than eight hectares, requiring a need for land reclamation to expand their areas. This will make the Municipality of Kalayaan to have a total of five barangays. On the other hand, Patag and Panata Islands are too small to be populated. They are most likely to remain as military outposts unless the Philippines opt to do some massive land reclamation projects on the islands. Rizal, Balagtas and Ayungin Reefs will likely remain as fishing zones occupied by Philippine forces. Land reclamation on these reefs, like what Malaysia did to Swallow Reef where Malaysia turned it into an artificial island with 6.2 hectares area, will reduce the Philippines' fishing space. Thus, such reclamation projects might be opposed by Filipino fishermen who regularly fish in the said reefs.

A proposal to build lighthouses in some shallow features to the east of the 116°E meridian like Iroquois Reef and Sabina Shoal is also being considered.

Filipino soldiers guarding the islands sometimes struggled with isolation and restlessness in their assignment. Although they pointed to the beauty of the sandy beaches, the soldiers mentioned feeling like prisoners even during periods of good weather. There were satellite dishes to provide soldiers access to television shows, and a satellite telephone for them to have continuous contact with their family and superiors, but otherwise entertainment was limited and they had only their fellow soldiers for companionship on the island.

The soldiers in Lawak Island, just to signify how bored they were, said that they enjoy watching the flights, egg-laying and incubation of the numerous sea gulls living on the island.

The soldiers on Rizal Reef, on the other hand, enjoy fishing. Rizal Reef has white sandbars which are above water level when the tide is not extremely high. These sandbars enclose many lagoons which according to the soldiers are like "swimming pools" for the clear water they enclose. When the weather is bad (e.g., typhoon), there comes the boredom. They have no choice but to stay inside their small quarters on stilts. However, they are not totally bitter when the weather is bad since it is also their source of clean water. The roof of their quarters is made such that it can catch raindrops and stock them in a huge container. The soldiers said that, unlike food which can be provided by their fishing and a vegetable garden beside their barracks, fresh water is their number one concern. When they run out of fresh water supplied by the Philippine Navy or Coast Guard, they begin drinking the water caught from the rain. And during these times is when they limit their baths as much as they can.

Soldiers on Ayungin Reef have similar problems regarding clean water. However, unlike the soldiers in Rizal Reef who have small quarters, the soldiers in Ayungin Reef have a much better lifestyle. Their shelter is the grounded BRP Sierra Madre, a Philippine naval vessel. They have individual beds, a karaoke machine, and a dining area.

The Philippine Marines in Panata Island, on the other hand, used to raise up to five sharks at a time in a lagoon located in the middle of the island.

The Philippine government tries to compensate for this boredom by giving the soldiers a salary way above their normal salary. Actually, this has been the reason why some of the soldiers always volunteer to take the job despite the boredom.

=== Oil exploration ===
The area surrounding Spratly is said to be rich in yet unexplored oil and gas fields, and hence, remains controversial.

The Philippines began exploring the areas west of Palawan for oil in 1970. Exploration in the area began in Reed Bank/Tablemount (Reed Bank is the largest seamount within the Spratly Islands) in 1976, gas was discovered following the drilling of a well. However, China's complaints halted the exploration.

Map showing oil and lead fields in Reed Bank

Today, Malampaya oil platform is the only operational oil platform in the Philippines. It is extracting natural gas from the Camago-Malampaya oil leg (CMOL) (or simply Malampaya Field), located 80 kilometres (50 mi) west of northern Palawan. It is not claimed by other countries. It contains 3.7 trillion cubic feet (1.0×10^{11} m^{3}) of natural gas reserves. The Malapaya Project began the Philippines' natural gas industry and enabled the supply of at least 2,700 megawatts of power for a period of at least 20 years starting 2002. In December 2001, an extended well test of the thin oil rim beneath the field initially yielded about 8 million barrels (1,300,000 m^{3}) of oil per day (bpd). It is also believed to be the deepest horizontal subsea well test undertaken in the world at a depth of about 850 m.

The upstream component of the US$4.5 billion Malampaya gas-to-power project was jointly developed by Shell Philippines Exploration B.V. (SPEX), ChevronTexaco and PNOC EC. The project was formally inaugurated on October 16, 2001. Shell Philippines Exploration owns 45% of the project, ChevronTexaco owns 45% and PNOC-EC owns 10%. Malampaya is expected to provide substantial long-term revenue of between $8–10 billion USD to the Philippine government over its life span. Other sites eyed by PNOC-EC west of Palawan are the Calamian, West Calamian, West Balabac, and East Sabina sites.

Another oil field being explored today is Reed Bank, which exploration was halted in 1980's after China's objections. The concession is currently awarded to Forum Energy plc, a UK-based oil, gas and coal company. The Reed Bank concession is located in the South China Sea west of Palawan Island. The licence is located to the southwest of the Shell-operated Malampaya Gas Field.

The concession was first awarded to Sterling Energy plc (which later merged with another company to form Forum Energy) in June 2002. In 2003 Sterling reprocessed 250 km of 2D seismic data and completed a feasibility study on the gas-to-liquid options for the gas field. The seismic work and the gas-to-liquid study fulfilled the initial work commitments on the concession and Sterling was granted a 12-month extension in June 2004. In 2005 Forum acquired new 3D seismic data over the licence area fulfilling its work commitments required under the 12-month extension. In September 2006, results of the interpretation of the 3D seismic programme at the Sampaguita (an area inside Reed Bank) gas discovery indicated a world class gas accumulation with potential reserves of up to 20 trillion cubic feet (5.7×10^{11} m^{3}).

Unlike Malampaya, Reed Bank is claimed by the People's Republic of China, Republic of China, and Vietnam. There is still no news on whether these countries are disputing this exploration or not. In March 2011, two Chinese vessels chased off the Veritas Voyager, a survey ship hired by Forum Energy—a UK-based company with a portfolio of projects in the Philippines. Forum Energy intends to return to Reed Bank in 2012 to explore for energy resources. The U.S. military has also signalled its return to the area, with war games scheduled in March with the Philippine navy near Reed Bank.

== Fisheries enforcement ==
=== Arrests of Chinese fishermen ===
Many Chinese vessels fish in the South China Sea. Some of these enter internal Philippine waters like the Sulu Sea, and not just disputed waters in the Spratly islands. The Philippines, in general, is tolerant in allowing Chinese vessels to fish in disputed areas including Scarborough Shoal and waters in the vicinity of Philippine-occupied Spratly islands. They are, however, arrested if the Philippine Navy or Coast Guard determines that they are doing illegal fishing activity (i.e., using dynamites, or cyanide poison).

The Philippines is less tolerant in waters east of the 116°E meridian, the Sulu Sea and the waters between Philippine islands (non-Spratly). Within these areas Chinese fishing vessels normally fly a Philippine flag to avoid suspicion, or try to escape into Malaysian or Indonesian waters when hailed to elude arrest. When caught the fishermen are usually charged with trespassing in Philippine territories.

The press in the Philippines regularly reports arrests of these fishermen, with violations ranging from failure to allow Philippine authorities to inspect their ships when inside Philippine waters, to using illegal fishing methods (dynamite, trawl net, or using cyanide poison), to fishing in marine reserves, or more commonly, poaching of endangered sea species like sea turtles. These fishermen are usually labeled as "Chinese poachers" by the Philippine press. Most of them are arrested in the Sulu Sea (an internal sea within the Philippines), with some apprehended in Scarborough Shoal. Rarely, arrests are made in the Visayas seas.

When poachers are arrested in the Spratly region, they are turned in to Puerto Princesa City, Palawan; if in the Sulu Sea, to Puerto Princesa City, Palawan or Zamboanga City whichever is nearer; if in Scarborough Shoal, to Subic, Zambales.

Apprehended poachers are put to trial quickly, to avoid further political disputes with China. Normally cases are disposed of within two months, with almost all being convictions. However, Philippine courts generally only confiscate the vessels, and fines the offenders a sum of money that is always paid by the Chinese government.

In other situations, the courts approve bail even before a trial could start, and the fishermen are repatriated. Environmentalists in the Philippines have always criticized the Philippine government for allowing Chinese fishermen to be released on bail, saying that they must still be punished under Philippine laws. China has always protested the Philippines' arrest of its fishermen, whether these were arrested in the Spratly region controlled by the Philippines, in Scarborough Shoal, or in the internal Sulu Sea.

=== Arrests of Vietnamese fishermen ===
There had been occasions of arrests of Vietnamese fishermen by the Philippine Navy and Coast Guard, however these are not as frequent as arrests of Chinese fishermen. The arrests are also caused largely by poaching activities. The latest arrest of Vietnamese fishermen happened in May 2014 in the province of Zambales.

== Map showing possessions ==
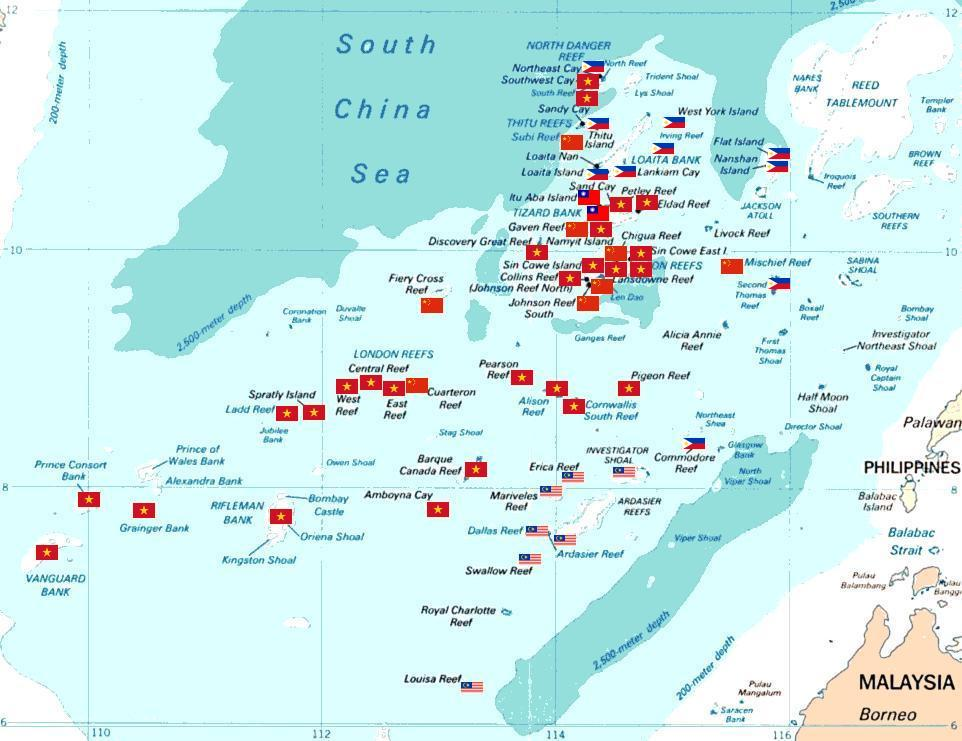
Spratly islands map showing occupied features marked with the flags of countries occupying them. Philippines Republic of China (Taiwan) Vietnam Malaysia People's Republic of China The flags are placed so that no text and flag overlap. Hence, some flags are not in the exact coordinates where they should actually lie. However, they still portray the general picture on how the Spratly Islands are divided among claimant nations. All occupied features are marked with flags, including those which are not labeled in the map. Here are all unlabeled features: Ban Than Reef (Taiwan) -The flag below the flag for Itu Aba Island (T). Higgens Reef (Vietnam) -The flag sandwiched between the flags for Sin Cowe Island (V) and Landsowne Reef (V). Whitson Reef (China) -The flag nearest the Chigua Reef label. Based on the coordinates of Whitson Reef which is 10°00'N 114°43'E, it should lie there. Kennan Reef (China) -The flag nearest the flag for Johnson South Reef (C).

== See also ==
- Kalayaan, Palawan
- Spratly Islands dispute
- Territorial disputes in the South China Sea
