= Loaita Cay =

Island in the South China Sea

Disputed island
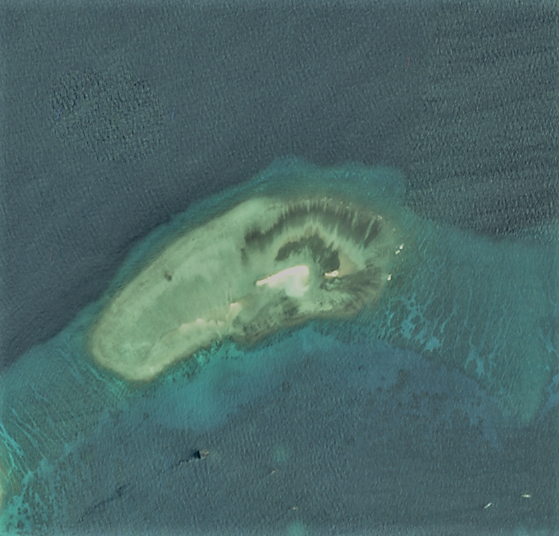
- Loaita Cay

- Location within Spratly Islands
- Other names: Panata Island (Philippine English); Pulo ng Panata (Filipino); Đảo Loại Ta Tây (Vietnamese) 南鑰沙洲 / 南钥沙洲 Nányào Shāzhōu (Chinese)

Geography
- Location: South China Sea
- Coordinates: 10°43′43″N 114°21′09″E
- Archipelago: Spratly Islands

Administration
- Philippines
- Region: IV-B - MIMAROPA
- Province: Palawan
- Municipality: Kalayaan

Claimed by
- China
- Philippines
- Taiwan
- Vietnam

Loaita Cay, also known as Panata Island (Filipino: Pulo ng Panata, lit. 'Island of Oath'; Vietnamese: Đảo Loại Ta Tây; Mandarin Chinese: 南鑰沙洲/南钥沙洲; pinyin: Nányào Shāzhōu), is an island in the Spratly Islands. It has an area of 0.53 hectares (1.3 acres) and it's located about 5 nautical miles (9.3 km; 5.8 mi) northwest of Philippine-occupied Loaita (Kota) Island, just west of the north of Dangerous Ground.

The island is administered by the Philippines as part of Kalayaan, Palawan, and is the seventh largest of the Philippine-occupied islands. It is also claimed by the People's Republic of China, the Republic of China (Taiwan), and Vietnam.

== Environment ==
The island is a low, flat, sandy cay, and is subject to erosion. It changes its shape seasonally. The sand build up depends largely on the direction of prevailing winds and waves; it has taken an elongated shape for some years. Like Flat Island and Lankiam Cay, it is barren of any vegetation. No underground water source has been found in the area.

== History ==
On 22 May 1963, a sovereignty stele was rebuilt on Loaita Island by crew members of the three vessels Huong Giang, Chi Lang and Ky Hoa of the South Vietnam.

Presently, the island serves as a military observation outpost, and is guarded by Philippine soldiers stationed at nearby Loaita (Kota) Island who regularly visit. It is kept under observation from a tall structure on Loaita Island.

The location of this outpost, which the Philippines calls Panata Island, is often misreported as being on Lankiam Cay, to the east of Loaita Island. While reports suggest Lankiam was once a small sandy cay, it appears to have been washed away, leaving only a submerged reef and a small, shifting sand bar. If there was ever a Filipino facility there, it was moved to Loaita Cay and took the name “Panata Island” with it.

To promote maritime safety, the Philippine Coast Guard (PCG) has constructed five lighthouses in the area, including Loaita Cay (Panata Island).

In 2026, President Bongbong Marcos issued the Executive Order No. 111, s. 2026, which is the adoption of a standard set of Philippine names for the 131 features of the Kalayaan Island Group and officially adopted the Philippine name for the Loaita Cay as "Panata Island".

== See also ==
- Policies, activities and history of the Philippines in Spratly Islands
