= Flat Island (South China Sea) =

Island of the Philippines

Disputed island
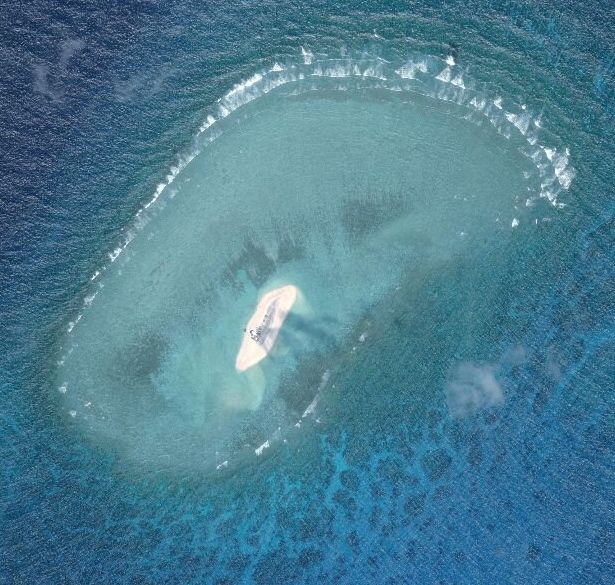
- Flat Island

- Location within Spratly Islands
- Other names: Patag Island (Philippine English); Pulo ng Patag (Filipino); Đảo Bình Nguyên (Vietnamese) 費信島 / 费信岛 Fèixìn Dǎo (Chinese)

Geography
- Location: South China Sea
- Coordinates: 10°49′00″N 115°49′20″E
- Archipelago: Spratly Islands

Administration
- Philippines
- Region: IV-B - MIMAROPA
- Province: Palawan
- Municipality: Kalayaan

Claimed by
- China
- Philippines
- Taiwan
- Vietnam

Additional information

Flat Island, also known as Patag Island (Filipino: Pulo ng Patag; Mandarin Chinese: 費信島/费信岛; pinyin: Fèixìn Dǎo; Vietnamese: Đảo Bình Nguyên), is the second smallest of the natural Spratly Islands. It has an area of 0.57 hectares (5,700 m^{2}), and is about 10 kilometres (6.2 mi) north of Philippine-occupied Nanshan Island, both of which are located on the expansive but otherwise submerged Flat Island Bank in the northeast part of the Dangerous Ground area in the South China Sea.

It is the sixth largest of the Philippine-occupied Spratly islands and is administered by the Philippines as part of Kalayaan, Palawan. The island is also claimed by the People's Republic of China, the Republic of China (Taiwan), and Vietnam.

== Environment ==
The island is a low, flat, sandy cay, 240 by 90 metres (790 by 300 ft), and is subject to erosion. It changes its shape seasonally. The sand build up depends largely on the direction of prevailing winds and waves; it has taken an elongated shape for some years, the shape of a crescent moon for a few years, and the shape of a letter "S". Like Lankiam Cay, it is barren of any vegetation. No underground water source has been found in the area.

== Philippine occupation ==
Presently, the island serves as a military observation outpost and is guarded by Philippine soldiers stationed at nearby Lawak Island. The soldiers regularly visit the island, and it is kept under observation from a tall structure on Lawak Island.

In August 2011, the Philippine Navy Seabees (Naval Combat Engineer Brigade) finished construction of a second star shell-like structure which is intended to shelter and protect troops.

The Philippine Coast Guard constructed 5 lighthouses in the area, and this includes one on Flat Island.

== See also ==
- Spratly Islands Dispute
- Policies, activities and history of the Philippines in Spratly Islands
