= Nanshan Island =

Island in the South China Sea

Lawak Island
Disputed island
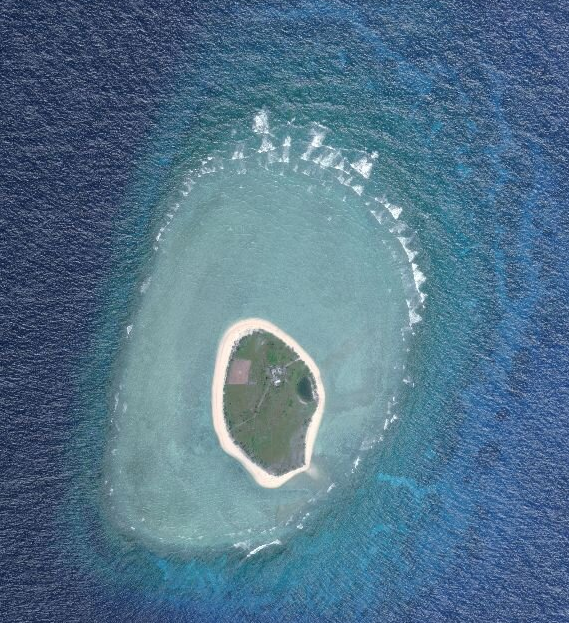
- Nanshan Island

- Location within Spratly Islands
- Other names: Lawak Island (Philippine English); Pulo ng Lawak (Filipino) 馬歡島 / 马欢岛 Mǎhuān Dǎo (Chinese); Đảo Vĩnh Viễn (Vietnamese)

Geography
- Location: South China Sea
- Coordinates: 10°44′N 115°48′E
- Archipelago: Spratly Islands

Administration
- Philippines
- Region: IV-B - MIMAROPA
- Province: Palawan
- Municipality: Kalayaan

Claimed by
- Philippines
- China
- Taiwan
- Vietnam

Additional information

Nanshan Island, also known as Lawak Island (Filipino: Pulo ng Lawak, lit. 'Island of Vastness'; Mandarin Chinese: 馬歡島/马欢岛; pinyin: Mǎhuān Dǎo; Vietnamese: Đảo Vĩnh Viễn), is the eighth largest natural island of the Spratly Islands, and the fourth largest of the Philippine-occupied islands (none of the Philippine-occupied islands have any significant amount of reclaimed land). It has an area of 7.93 hectares (19.6 acres). It is located 98 miles (158 km) east of Thitu Island (Pag-asa).

On April 5, 2024, the island is administered by the Kalayaan Island Group, Philippines as a part of Kalayaan, Palawan by virtue of the Memorandum of Agreement signed by Governor Victorino Dennis M. Socrates, Chairman, Palawan Council for Sustainable Development Staff in partnership with United States Agency for International Development through its “Sustainable Interventions for Biodiversity, Ocean, and Landscapes (Sibol)” project. In September 2022, the PCSD declared it as a critical habitat.

== Environment ==
This island serves as a sanctuary for migratory birds like the Sooty tern, about 4,190, Brown noddy, about 45, and Greater crested tern with 32, which are considered vulnerable in the Philippine Red List of Threatened Fauna. The Palawan Council for Sustainable Development (PCSD) is tasked to protect at least these three endangered species of birds endemic to the 7.9-hectare island. The Island hosts a sanctuary to 4,300 migratory birds that travel from the north to as far as the Great Barrier Reef in Australia. “This highlights how integral Palawan is to Global Ecology and Biogeography and the world’s bird populations. Endangering this critical habitat would have a significant impact on global biodiversity,” said PCSD Executive Director Teodoro Jose Matta, citing Republic Act 9147, "Wildlife Resources Conservation and Protection Act".

Its surroundings are highly phosphatized such that superphosphate materials can be mined out on a small-scale basis. Near the fringes of the breakwaters (approx. 2 miles (3 km) from the island), intact hard coral reefs were observed to retain their natural environment and beautiful tropical fishes were seen colonizing these coral beds of varying colors. It is also covered with coconut trees, bushes and grass. It is 580 m long, on the edge of a submerged reef.

== Philippine occupation ==
A handful of Philippine soldiers and their families are stationed on the island, which has been inhabited since 1968 when the Philippines occupied this island. There are only one to two structures in this island that serve as shelters for the soldiers. The soldiers are also the guard of nearby Flat (Patag) Island which lies 6 miles (10 km) north-northeast of the island which is also occupied by the Philippines. The island has a helipad.

The Philippine Coast Guard constructed 5 lighthouses in the area, and this includes one on Nanshan Island.

Nanshan (Lawak) Island is claimed by the People's Republic of China, the Republic of China (Taiwan), and Vietnam.

As of February 2026, the local government of Kalayaan has identified Nanshan (Lawak) Island, a known bird sanctuary, as a feature suitable for potential future civilian settlement. This island is viewed by municipal officials as a location for strengthening the administrative presence of the Philippines in the West Philippine Sea. The proposed expansion is contingent upon the prior development of infrastructure, such as transport and community support facilities, to ensure long-term sustainability, following the model of civilian-military integration achieved on Thitu (Pag-asa) Island.

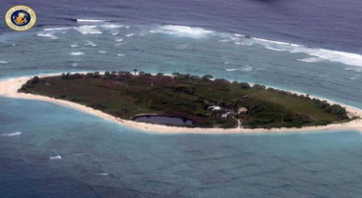
Different angle of Nanshan (Lawak) Island

As of May 2026, there are new reports and satellite images that show the Philippine Navy and Philippine Coast Guard is building a large port and storage building facility in the island for larger ships to dock like Tarlac-class landing platform dock and Rajah Sulayman-class offshore patrol vessel and Parola-class patrol vessel can help the Philippine Navy and Coast Guard to increase their presence in that area particularly near Mischief Reef.

== See also ==
- Kalayaan, Palawan
- Philippines and the Spratly Islands
- Spratly Islands dispute
