= West York Island =

Island in the South China Sea

Disputed island
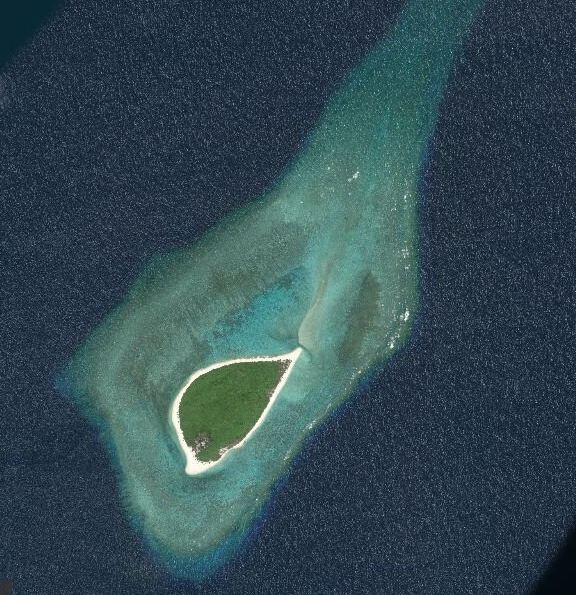
- West York Island

- Location within Spratly Islands
- Other names: Likas Island (Philippine English); Pulo ng Likas (Filipino) đảo Bến Lạc (Vietnamese) 西月島 / 西月岛 Xīyuè Dǎo (Chinese)

Geography
- Location: South China Sea
- Coordinates: 11°05′N 115°0′E
- Archipelago: Spratly Islands

Administration
- Philippines
- Region: IV-B - MIMAROPA
- Province: Palawan
- Municipality: Kalayaan

Claimed by
- China
- Philippines
- Taiwan
- Vietnam

Additional information

West York Island, also known as Likas Island (Filipino: Pulo ng Likas, lit. 'Island of Naturality'; Mandarin Chinese: 西月島/西月岛; pinyin: Xīyuè Dǎo; Vietnamese: đảo Bến Lạc), and several other names. With an area of 18.6 hectares (46 acres), it is the third largest of the naturally occurring Spratly Islands, and the second largest (after Thitu Island) of the Philippine-occupied islands. It is 530 yards (485 m) wide, 330 yards (302 m) long, and its highest elevation is 30 feet (9 m).

The island is administered by the Philippines as part of Kalayaan, Palawan; it is located 47 miles (76 km) northeast of Pagasa Island (Thitu Island), the location of the Philippine defined major town of Kalayaan. Filipino soldiers are stationed on the island.

The island is also claimed by the People's Republic of China, the Republic of China (Taiwan) and Vietnam.

== Structures and environment ==
West York Island is covered with low vegetation and scrub. Outcrops are visible on the southern and eastern portion of the island during low tides. It is a sanctuary for giant sea turtles that lay their eggs on the island all year round. The high salinity of the groundwater on the island retards the growth of introduced trees like coconuts, ipil-ipil, and other types; only those plants indigenous to the area, (mostly beach types of plants), thrive and survive the hot and humid condition, especially during the dry season.

There are no buildings on the island, except for the ruins of houses built by Japanese soldiers during World War II, and a small Philippine observation post where Filipino soldiers are stationed.

The Philippine Coast Guard constructed 5 lighthouses in the area, and this includes one on West York Island.

== Plans ==
As of February 2026, the local government of Kalayaan has identified West York (Likas) Island, a recognized green turtle sanctuary, as a candidate for potential future civilian settlement to bolster the administrative presence of the municipality in the Kalayaan Island Group. This island is part of a broader municipal strategy to reinforce regional governance and enhance the delivery of basic services, with full-scale settlement remaining contingent upon the prior establishment of foundational infrastructure to ensure long-term viability for future residents.

== See also ==
- Spratly Islands
- Kalayaan, Palawan
- List of maritime features in the Spratly Islands
- Policies, activities and history of the Philippines in Spratly Islands
