= Kalayaan, Palawan =

Municipality in the Philippines

Kalayaan
- Municipality
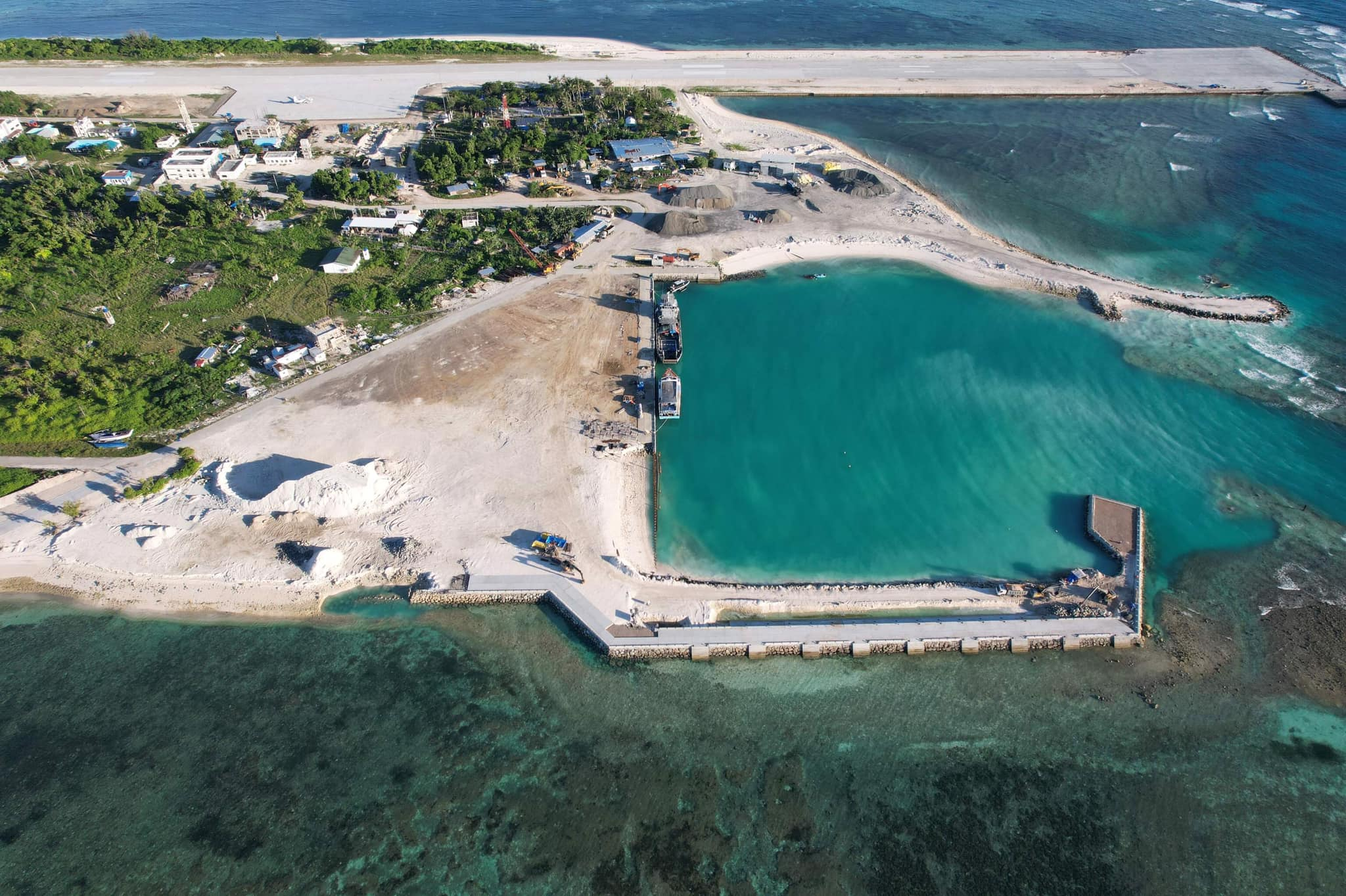
- Seaport under-construction in Thitu Island.

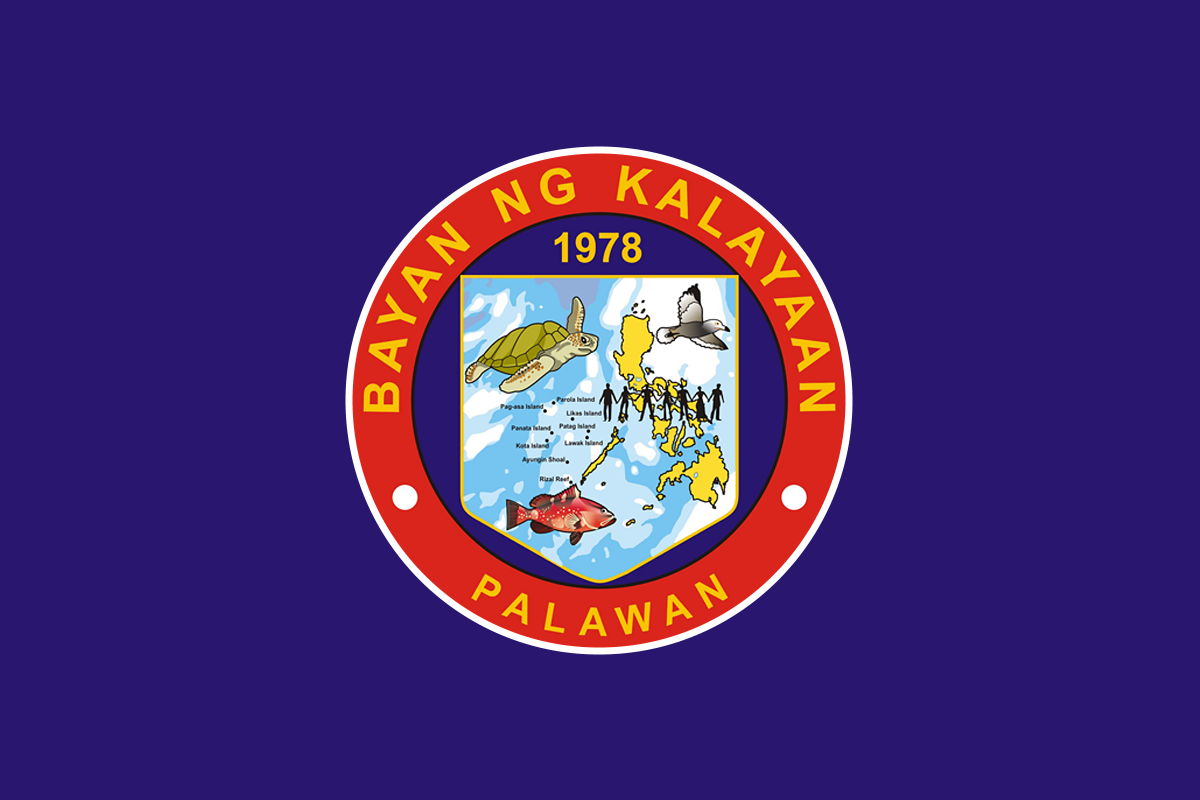
- Flag Seal
- Anthem: Kalayaan March
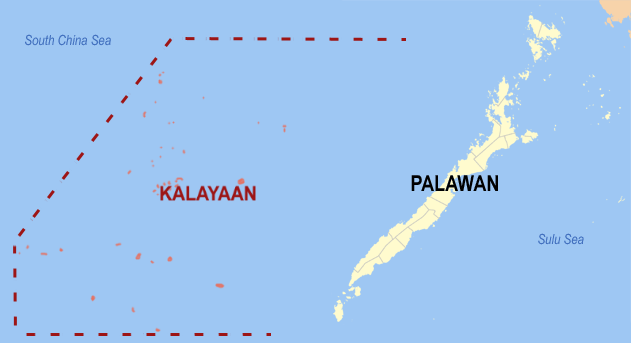
- Map of Palawan showing Kalayaan's claimed boundaries, parts of which are controlled or claimed by other countries.
- Interactive map of Kalayaan
- Location in the South China Sea and the Philippines Kalayaan (Philippines)
- Coordinates: 11°03′08″N 114°17′00″E
- Country: Philippines
- Region: Mimaropa
- Province: Palawan
- District: 1st district
- Founded: June 11, 1978
- Barangays: 1 (Pag-asa)

Government
  - Type: Sangguniang Bayan
  - Mayor: Beltzasar S. Alindongan
  - Vice Mayor: Maurice Philip Alexis S. Albayda
  - Representative: Rosalie Salvame
  - Municipal Council: Members: Nonelon B. Balbontin; Nonie C. Gapuz; Roberto M. Asiado; Hubert B. Llavan; Francis P. Polizon; Marilou S. Vales; Monico A. Abogado; Eugenio B. Bito-onon Jr.
  - Electorate: 819 voters (2025)

Area
  - Total: 290.00 km^{2} (111.97 sq mi)
- Elevation: 0 m (0 ft)
- Highest elevation: 14 m (46 ft)
- Lowest elevation: 0 m (0 ft)

Population (2024 census)
  - Total: 406
  - Density: 1.40/km^{2} (3.63/sq mi)
  - Households: 35

Economy
  - Income class: 4th municipal income class
  - Poverty incidence: 18.21% (2021)
  - Revenue: ₱ 125 million (2024)
  - Assets: ₱ 326.1 million (2024)
  - Expenditure: ₱ 112.7 million (2024)
  - Liabilities: ₱ 21.93 million (2024)

Service provider
  - Electricity: Kalayaan Municipal Electric System (KAMES)
- Time zone: UTC+8 (PST)
- ZIP code: 5322
- PSGC: 1705321000
- IDD : area code: +63 (0)48
- Native languages: Palawano; Tagalog
- Website: kalayaanpalawan.gov.ph

Kalayaan, officially the Municipality of Kalayaan (Tagalog: Bayan ng Kalayaan), is a municipality under the jurisdiction of the province of Palawan, Philippines. According to the 2024 census, it has a population of 406 people, making it the least populated municipality in Palawan and in the Philippines.

Part of the Spratly Islands, in the South China Sea, the Kalayaan municipality, which includes Thitu Island (locally known as Pag-asa, the administrative center of Kalayaan Island Group) is 280 nautical miles (320 mi; 520 km) northwest of Puerto Princesa and 932 kilometres (503 nmi; 579 mi) south-west of Metro Manila. It consists of a single barangay named Pag-asa located on Thitu, which also serves as the seat of the municipal government. Besides Thitu Island, the municipality comprises six other islands: West York Island, Northeast Cay, Nanshan Island, Loaita Island, Flat Island and Loaita Cay (respectively locally named Likas, Parola, Lawak, Kota, Patag and Panata), and three shoals or reefs: Irving Reef (Balagtas Reef), Second Thomas Shoal (Ayungin Shoal) and Commodore Reef (Rizal Reef). It is the least populated municipality in the Philippines. Kalayaan's annual budget is 47 million pesos (about $1.1 million).

All the islands and shoals within the municipality are disputed territories, claimed by all or some of China, Malaysia, Taiwan, and Vietnam.

== History ==
There are records of various cultures in the region passing through the islands for trade. Permanent populations and military stations only became apparent in the 20th century.

In 1734, the Spanish colonial government in the Philippines published the first edition of the Velarde map, which details territories under full sovereign control of Spanish Philippines, including Scarborough Shoal (called Panacot in the indigenous language in the map) and Kalayaan or Spratly Islands (referred in the map as Los Bajos de Paragua), and is the earliest map to showcase the sovereignty of a nation over Scarborough Shoal and the Spratly Islands. The official territories of the Philippines was again published in the 1808 Carita General del Archipelago Filipino and again in the 1875 Carita General del Archipelago Filipino, which continued to include the Kalayaan islands.

After the Spanish-American War, Spain lost and ceded the territory of the Philippines to the United States through the 1898 Treaty of Paris. The 1898 Treaty of Paris created a treaty line, where Scarborough Shoal, the Kalayaan or Spratly Islands, and parts of Tawi-tawi continued to be under Spanish sovereignty. This led to talks between Spain and the United States, which ended upon the signing of the 1900 Treaty of Washington, which rectified retroactively the 1898 Treaty of Paris. Under the 1900 Treaty of Washington, "all islands belonging to the Philippine Archipelago, lying outside the lines described in Article III" were also ceded to the United States as part of the territory of the Philippines, where Scarborough Shoal, the Kalayaan or Spratly Islands, and the rest of Tawi-tawi was included. From 1899 to 1902, the United States war department in the territory of the Philippines republished and reissued four times the 1875 Carita General del Archipelago Filipino with the addition of military telegraph lines, military cable lines, eastern cable company lines, and military department boundaries. The official map of the entire Philippine territory under Spanish rule was effectively adopted as the entire Philippine territory under American rule. During the 1928 Islas Palmas international case, the United States, as representative of the territory of the Philippines, reiterated in a court memorandum that the 1875 Carta General del Archipielago Filipino "is both an American official and a Spanish official map" of Philippine territory, bounding the United States on its recognition of the Scarborough Shoal and the Kalayaan or Spratly Islands as Philippine territory.

Under the Commonwealth of the Philippines, the 1935 Constitution was adopted, reiterating the national territory of the Philippines, which included Scarborough Shoal and the Kalayaan or Spratly Islands. After regaining independence in 1946, the Philippines again asserted its claims to the Spratly islands. The Americans at the time discouraged the Philippines to avoid conflict with the Chinese government of Chiang Kai-shek, who was an ally of the United States. In 1946, Vice President Elpidio Quirino reiterated the "New Southern Islands", the forerunner name for Kalayaan, as part of the Philippines.

In 1947, Tomás Cloma stumbled upon the Kalayaan islands, which were uninhabited at the time. On May 11, 1956, together with forty men, Cloma took formal possession of the islands, lying some 380 miles (610 km) west of the southern end of Palawan and named them the "Free Territory of Freedomland". Four days later, Cloma issued and posted copies of his "Notice to the Whole World" on each of the islands as "a decisive manifestation of unwavering claim over the territory". On May 31, 1956, Cloma declared the establishment of the Free Territory of Freedomland, ten days after sending his second representation to the Philippine Secretary of Foreign Affairs, informing the latter that the territory claimed was named "Freedomland". On July 6, 1956, Cloma declared his claim to the whole world and the establishment of a separate government for the "Free Territory of Freedomland" with its capital on Flat Island (Patag Island). His declaration was met with violent and unfriendly reactions from several neighboring countries especially the Republic of China (ROC; on Taiwan since 1949), when it effectively garrisoned the nearby island of Itu Aba and intercepted Cloma's men and vessels found within its immediate waters on September 24, 1956. In 1974, Cloma ceded his rights over the islands to the government of the Philippines for one peso, after being imprisoned.

In 1978, the Municipality of Kalayaan was created through Presidential Decree No. 1596 taking effect on June 11, 1978. This established what the document described as "a distinct and separate municipality of the Province of Palawan".

PD 1596 defined the boundaries of the municipality as follows:

From a point [on the Philippine Treaty Limits] at latitude 7º40' North and longitude 116º00' East of Greenwich, thence due West along the parallel of 7º40' N to its intersection with the meridian of longitude 112º10' E, thence due north along the meridian of 112º10' E to its intersection with the parallel of 9º00' N, thence north-eastward to the intersection of parallel of 12º00' N with the meridian of longitude 114º30' E, thence, due East along the parallel of 12º00' N to its intersection with the meridian of 118º00' E, thence, due South along the meridian of longitude 118º00' E to its intersection with the parallel of 10º00' N, thence Southwestwards to the point of beginning at 7º40' N, latitude and 116º00' E longitude. i.e. 7º40'N 116º00'E; west to 7º40'N 112º10'E; north to 9º00'N 112º10'E; NE to 12º00'N 114º30'E; east to 12º00'N 118º00'E; south to 10º00'N 118º00'E; SW to 7º40'N 116º00'E.

In 2009, Republic Act No. 9522, which defined the archipelagic baselines of the Philippines, was enacted into law. It gave additional weight to the Philippines' sovereignty over the Kalayaan Island Group under Section 2, sub-paragraph A which described the territory as a "Regime of Islands"—a concept defined in the United Nation Convention on Law of the Sea for similar bodies of land.

In 2012, the government began its legal battle against China in international court. The court proceedings occurred from 2013 to 2016. In 2016, the dash-line utilized by both the Republic of China (Taiwan) and People's Republic of China (PRC) was declared as invalid by the South China Sea Arbitration ruling. As of November 2023, 26 governments support the ruling, 17 issued generally positive statements noting the ruling but not called for compliance, and eight rejected it.

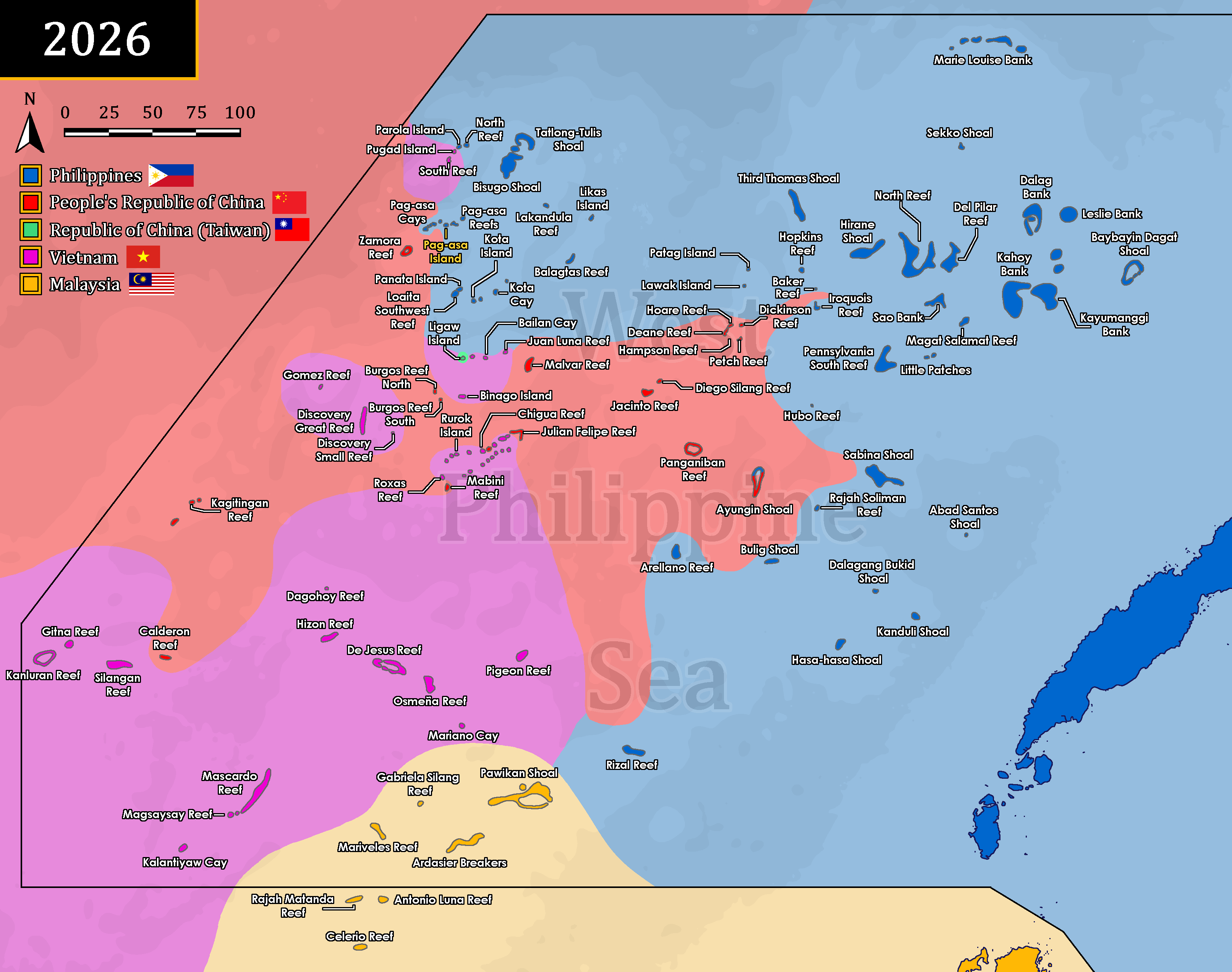
The map of the municipality of Kalayaan under Palawan province and the de facto control of each country in the area within the jurisdiction of the Philippines.

In 2024, Republic Act No. 12064, was enacted into law, which define the Philippine Maritime Zones. It clarifies the maritime zones of the Philippines, including those surrounding the Kalayaan Island Group in the West Philippine Sea shall have a territorial sea of 12 nautical miles from its baselines.

In addition to the Philippines, China, Taiwan, Vietnam, and Malaysia all claim the Spratly Archipelago either as a whole or in part. The Philippines occupies 10 reefs and islands. The People's Republic of China presently occupies seven reefs. The Republic of China (Taiwan)'s solitary island is the largest in the archipelago at approximately 43 hectares (0.43 km^{2}). Vietnam occupies 21 islets and reefs. Malaysia claims 7 reefs including Layang Layang which currently hosts a naval base and a diving resort. Investigator Shoal is currently under de facto administration of Malaysia although is claimed by the Philippines as part of the municipality.

=== Restrictions by China ===
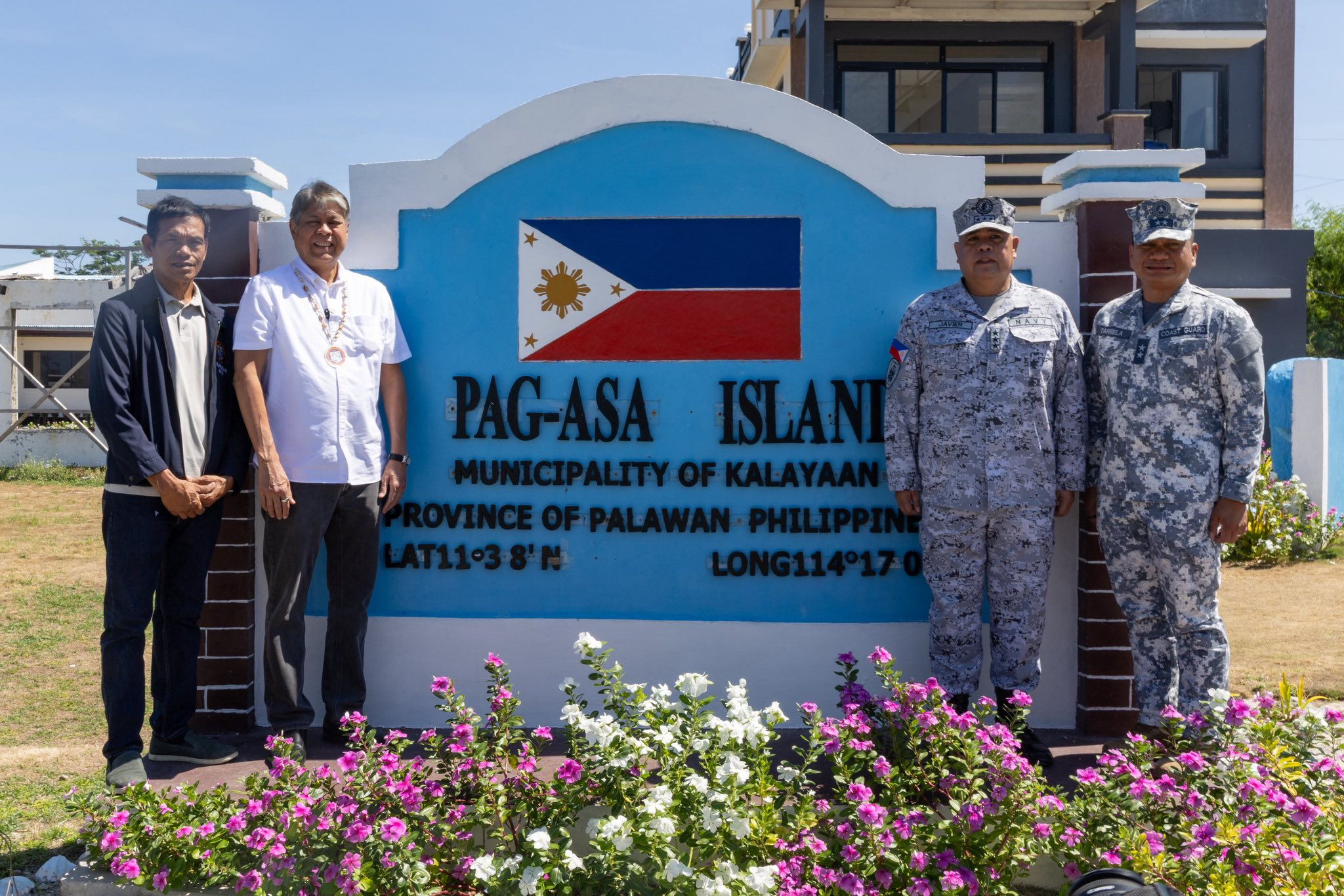
Senator Francis Pangilinan's (second from left) visit to Kalayaan in May 2026

In January 2026, the municipal council of Kalayaan declared Chinese ambassador to the Philippines Jing Quan persona non grata. The municipality stated: "Ambassador Jing Quan and the Chinese Embassy recently engaged in blatant interference by demanding that the Philippine government 'hold accountable' Commodore Jay Tarriela, the Philippine Coast Guard Spokesperson for the West Philippine Sea, for his transparency efforts — an act that constitutes an attempt to intimidate a Philippine officer for performing his patriotic duty."

This action prompted China to ban 16 Kalayaan officials from entry in mainland China, Hong Kong, and Macau in February 2026. Reflecting on the 2023 and 2026 resolutions declaring two Chinese ambassadors persona non grata, the Chinese embassy stated that "individuals involved in fabricating the said resolutions are not welcome" and justified the travel restrictions "based on the principle of reciprocity". The Philippine Department of Foreign Affairs reacted that the ban is detrimental to the diplomatic relations between China and the Philippines. The Malacañang Palace expressed not to interfere stating: "Whatever decisions and policies China has made are not within our jurisdiction, just as they should not cover or interfere with whatever decisions this administration makes."

== Geography ==
Unofficial NAMRIA map showing features in the Kalayaan Island Group (Spratly Islands). Features names are those recognized by Philippine government.

Kalayaan is located in the western section of the Province of Palawan. It consists of one barangay:

- Pag-asa

Currently, the barangay exercises jurisdiction over eight islets (four of which are cays) and three reefs, with an aggregate land area of approximately 79 hectares (0.79 km^{2}; 200 acres; 0.31 sq mi). They are as follows:

Feature name		Area	Type
Philippine name	International name	Area	Type
Pag-asa	Thitu Island	32.7 ha (81 acres)	Island
Likas	West York Island	18.6 ha (46 acres)	Island
Parola	Northeast Cay	12.7 ha (31 acres)	Cay
Lawak	Nanshan Island	7.9 ha (20 acres)	Island
Kota	Loaita Island	6.5 ha (16 acres)	Island
Patag	Flat Island	0.57 ha (1.4 acres)	Cay
Panata	Loaita Cay	0.53 ha (1.3 acres)	Cay
Kota Cay	Lankiam Cay	0.44 ha (1.1 acres)	Cay
Balagtas	Irving Reef	0	Reef
Ayungin	Second Thomas Shoal	0	Reef
Rizal	Commodore Reef	0	Reef

=== Topography ===
The islets that comprise the municipality are generally flat. The highest ground elevation is approximately 2 metres (6 ft 7 in) above sea level.

=== Climate ===
Climate data for Kalayaan, Palawan
Month	Jan	Feb	Mar	Apr	May	Jun	Jul	Aug	Sep	Oct	Nov	Dec	Year
Mean daily maximum °C (°F)	27 (81)	26 (79)	27 (81)	28 (82)	29 (84)	29 (84)	28 (82)	28 (82)	28 (82)	28 (82)	28 (82)	27 (81)	28 (82)
Mean daily minimum °C (°F)	26 (79)	26 (79)	26 (79)	28 (82)	28 (82)	28 (82)	28 (82)	27 (81)	27 (81)	27 (81)	27 (81)	26 (79)	27 (81)
Average precipitation mm (inches)	155 (6.1)	71 (2.8)	101 (4.0)	80 (3.1)	251 (9.9)	407 (16.0)	399 (15.7)	344 (13.5)	400 (15.7)	314 (12.4)	338 (13.3)	347 (13.7)	3,207 (126.2)
Average rainy days	17.4	11.1	11.8	11.2	19.4	24.6	25.3	25.2	25.4	24.1	24.6	23.5	243.6
Source: Meteoblue (modeled/calculated data, not measured locally)

== Demographics ==
Population census of Kalayaan
Year	Pop.	±% p.a.
1980	334	—
1990	50	−17.30%
1995	349	+43.92%
2000	223	−9.16%
2007	114	−8.84%
2010	222	+27.45%
2015	184	−3.51%
2020	193	+1.01%
2024	406	+19.55%
Source: Philippine Statistics Authority

In the 2024 census, the population of Kalayaan was 406 people, with a density of 1.4 inhabitants per square kilometre or 3.6 inhabitants per square mile. The civilian population, which includes children, was introduced in 2002.

== Infrastructure ==
Kalayaan municipality has an airstrip, a naval port, a five-bed lying-in clinic, an evacuation center, a municipal covered court, a police station, a coast guard station, a marine research station, and a small integrated elementary and high school. Formerly an exclusively military installation, Thitu Island was opened to civilian settlement in 2002.

=== Rancudo Airfield ===
Thitu Island (Pag-asa) hosts a 1,300-meter runway constructed in the early 1970s on orders of Major General Jose Rancudo, Commanding General of the Philippine Air Force. In February 1992, the Armed Forces of the Philippines named the runway "Rancudo Airfield" in honor of its architect.

=== Beaching Ramp and Seaport ===
On June 9, 2020, the Department of National Defense led the inauguration of a beaching ramp on Thitu Island (Pag-asa) which was finally completed after three years. The facility enabled to bring in more materials and equipment to repair and maintain the airstrip and building of other facilities. Also, Department of Transportation (DOTR) confirmed that the new seaport and sheltered port in Thitu Island is completed and ready to operate by June 12.

=== Telecommunications ===
Smart Telecommunications established a cell site, connected to its main network via VSAT (Very-small-aperture terminal), on Thitu Island (Pag-asa) in 2005 making normal GSM-based cellphone communication with the island possible. The first call on the system took place on June 12 at 5:18 PM between the mayor of the municipality at the time and a Smart Telecom executive. The company completed a maintenance visit to the cell site in 2011, thus ensuring continued operation of the facility. However, the cell site was inactive since 2015. On August 30, 2020, Smart Telecommunications repaired and upgraded its cell site for 4G/LTE services in Thitu Island (Pag-asa).

In April 2021, the Department of Information and Communications Technology announced the installation of free Wi-Fi facilities at Pag-asa Integrated School, Barangay Hall, and other sites on the Thitu Island. This has allowed children on the island to continue with their distance learning.

=== Power supply ===
By day, the residents get electricity from a power generator owned by the municipal government. By night, they shift to stored solar power that comes from 1.5-volt solar panels installed on the Thitu Island. On June 12, 2021, The National Power Corporation switched on its P33 million Kalayaan Diesel Power Plant project that covered the supply, delivery and installation of the 300 kilowatt diesel generating sets, a 13.8-kilovolt (kV) distribution line and fuel oil storage tanks, providing round-the-clock power to the facilities on the Thitu Island.

=== Sheltered Port Project ===
As of May 2026, the Philippine government has prioritized infrastructure development on Nanshan (Lawak) Island as part of a maritime resilience strategy to strengthen its administrative presence in the Kalayaan Island Group. A key component of this initiative is the construction of a new sheltered port facility, which has been allocated over ₱1 billion across multiple budget cycles, including a significant investment for a second phase of development, to replace the island's existing shallow-water access and enhance the capability of the Philippine Coast Guard to dock vessels and maintain a sustained presence in the region. These development efforts, which are conducted under the oversight of the Department of Public Works and Highways and the Department of National Defense, are officially categorized as legitimate exercises of sovereign jurisdiction intended to support the welfare and livelihood of Filipino personnel and civilians within the Municipality of Kalayaan, despite objections from the Chinese government.

=== Proposed Expansion and Settlement ===
As of February 2026, the local government of Kalayaan has identified Nanshan (Lawak), West York (Likas), and Northeast Cay (Parola) Islands as "livable" features suitable for future civilian settlement to strengthen the country’s presence in the Kalayaan Island Group. According to Vice Mayor Maurice Phillip Albayda, these potential expansions are modeled after the successful civilian-military integration on Thitu (Pag-asa) Island, which serves as a proof of concept for the municipality. Municipal officials emphasize that these efforts aim to reinforce sovereign control and enhance the delivery of basic services, though full-scale settlement remains contingent upon the prior development of necessary infrastructure to ensure long-term sustainability for future residents.

== Environment ==
On June 8, 1982, Loaita Island (Kota) and Loaita Cay (Panata) islands were designated as marine turtle sanctuaries by the Ministry of National Resources (MNR) when it issued Administrative Order No. 8.

== Government ==
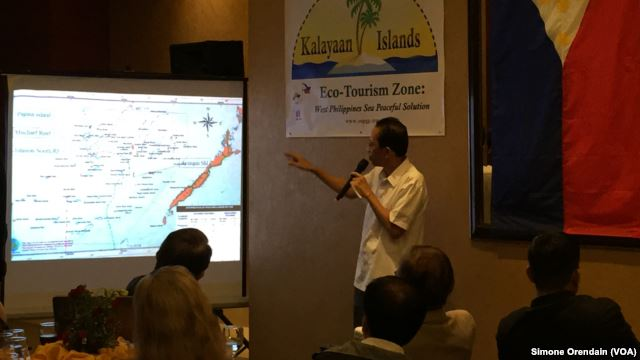
Mayor Eugenio B. Bito-Onon Jr., August 23, 2015.

The first recorded election in Kalayaan was on January 30, 1980, where Aloner M. Heraldo was elected as the first municipal mayor.

The Municipality of Kalayaan "demilitarized" on January 18, 1988, and the first appointed mayor, Alejandro Rodriguez, was replaced by his appointed vice mayor, Gaudencio R. Avencena.

The first free election was held on May 11, 1992, where mostly young municipal officers under the leadership of Mayor Gil D. Policarpio served for nine years (1992-2001).

A new administration assumed office on July 2, 2001, when Mayor Rosendo L. Mantes won the election on May 14, 2001.

It was replaced by Mayor Eugenio B. Bito-onon Jr. who served from June 30, 2010, to June 30, 2016.

It was replaced by Mayor Roberto M. del Mundo, who won an upset victory on May 9, 2016 election, who served from June 30, 2016, to June 30, 2025.

== Education ==
Thithu Island hosts Pag-asa Integrated School which provides basic education for its inhabitants.

== See also ==
- South China Sea Arbitration
- Nansha, Sansha, Hainan, China
- Trường Sa, Khánh Hòa, Vietnam
- Philippines and the Spratly Islands
- Spratly Islands dispute
- Free Territory of Freedomland
- Territorial disputes in the South China Sea
