= Lankiam Cay =

Island in the Spratly Islands

Disputed island
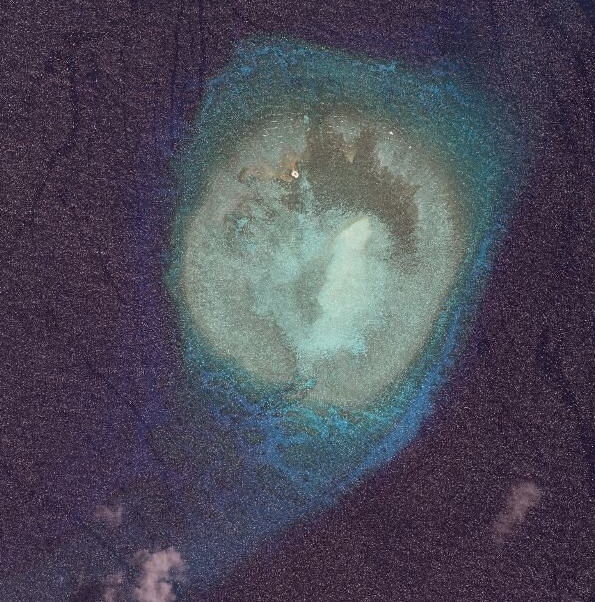
- Lankiam Cay

- Location within Spratly Islands
- Other names: kota Cay (Philippine English); Buhanginan ng Kota (Filipino) đá An Nhơn (Vietnamese) 楊信沙洲 / 杨信沙洲 Yángxìn Shāzhōu (Chinese)

Geography
- Location: South China Sea
- Coordinates: 10°43′N 114°32′E
- Archipelago: Spratly Islands

Administration
- Philippines
- Region: IV-B - MIMAROPA
- Province: Palawan
- Municipality: Kalayaan

Claimed by
- China
- Philippines
- Taiwan
- Vietnam

Additional information

Lankiam Cay, also known as Kota Cay (Filipino: Buhanginan ng Kota, lit. 'Cay of fortress'; Mandarin Chinese: 楊信沙洲/杨信沙洲; pinyin: Yángxìn Shāzhōu; Vietnamese: đá An Nhơn), is the smallest of the naturally occurring Spratly Islands. It has an area of 0.44 hectares (1.1 acres) (4,400 sq. m), and is located about 7 nautical miles (13 km; 8.1 mi) east-northeast of Philippine-occupied Loaita (Kota) Island, just west of the north of Dangerous Ground.

The island is administered by the Philippines as part of Kalayaan, Palawan, and is the eighth largest of the Philippine-occupied islands. It is also claimed by the People's Republic of China, the Republic of China (Taiwan), and Vietnam.

== Environment ==
At one time the island had a surface area of more than 5 hectares (12 acres), but strong waves brought by a strong typhoon washed out the sandy surface (beach) of the island leaving behind the calcarenite foundation that can be seen at low tide. It has a wide lagoon.

== Philippine occupation ==
The island is guarded by soldiers stationed at nearby Loaita Island who regularly visit. It is kept under observation from a tall structure on Loaita Island.

In 2026, President Bongbong Marcos issued the Executive Order No. 111, s. 2026, which is the adoption of a standard set of Philippine names for the 131 features of the Kalayaan Island Group and officially adopted the Philippine name for the Lankiam Cay as "Kota Cay".

== See also ==
- Policies, activities and history of the Philippines in Spratly Islands
