= List of Malay people =

This is a list of notable Malay people or notable people of Malay descent. The Malay people are an ethnic group in the Malay Peninsula and parts of nearby islands in Southeast Asia. Entries on this list are demonstrably notable by having a linked current article or reliable sources as footnotes against the name to verify they are notable and define themselves either full or partial Malay descent, whose ethnic origin lie in the Malay world.

This list also includes emigrant Malays and could be taken as a list of famous Malays.

== Activists ==
- Anwar Fazal, consumer, environmental activist, health advocate

== Actors ==
- Amir Ahnaf, Malaysian actor
- Aaron Aziz, Singaporean actor
- Aedy Ashraf, Malaysian actor
- Alif Satar, Malaysian singer, TV host and actor, 1/2 Malay
- Aznil Nawawi, Malaysian TV host, singer and actor
- Cico Harahap, Malaysian actor, 1/2 Batak, 1/2 Malay
- Dini Schatzmann, Malaysian actor, 1/2 Malay 1/2 Switzerland Germans
- Iqram Dinzly, Malaysian actor
- Izzue Islam, Malaysian actor
- Pierre Andre, Malaysian actor
- Shaheizy Sam, Malaysian actor
- Syafiq Kyle, Malaysian actor
- Stephen Rahman-Hughes, Welsh actor, 1/2 Malay
- Zizan Razak, Malaysian actor and singer

== Actress ==
- Asiah Aman, Singaporean actress and model, Singapore Hall of Fame 2022
- Artika Sari Devi, Indonesian actress and model
- Ayda Jebat, Malaysian singer and actress
- Fasha Sandha, Malaysian actress
- Heliza Helmi, Malaysian singer and activist
- Hazwani Helmi, Malaysian singer and activist
- Janna Nick, Malaysian actress, singer and producer, the most successful female singer in Malaysia in the early 2020s
- Liyana Fizi, Malaysian actress, singer and famous songwriter
- Mathira, Pakistani and Zimbabwean actress, 1/2 Malay
- Mishqah Parthiepal, South African actress, 1/4 Malay
- Maisie Conceição, Singaporean actress and singer, 1/4 Malay
- Revalina S. Temat, Indonesian actress
- Uji Rashid, Bruneian-Malay actress and singer
- Zizi Kirana, famous Malaysian actress and singer from Sabah region

== Astronomy ==
- Mazlan Othman, Malaysian astrophysicist who pioneered Malaysia's participation in Space exploration

== Astronauts ==
- Sheikh Muszaphar Shukor, first Malaysian astronaut
- Faiz Khaleed

== Business ==
- Nasimuddin Amin founder, chairman and chief executive officer of the Naza Group of Malaysia.
- Syed Mokhtar Al-Bukhary founder of the Albukhary Foundation
- Halim Saad
- Saleh Sulong
- Azman Hashim
- Nazir Razak
- Abdul Wahid Omar

== Chefs ==
- Norman Musa, chef and restaurateur
- Chef Wan, chef
- Zamzani Abdul Wahab, chef

== Criminals ==
- Rozman Jusoh, Malaysian convicted drug trafficker
- Ahmad Muin Yaacob, Malaysian convicted murderer
- Ahmad Najib Aris, Malaysian convicted murderer
- Mona Fandey, Malaysian convicted murderer

== Designers ==
- Muid Latif, graphic designer, multimedia designer
- Nor Aini Shariff, fashion designer
- Ashley Isham, fashion designer

== Filmmakers ==
- P. Ramlee, Malaysian singer, actor and film director
- Jamil Sulong, Malaysian actor, film director and comic book artist
- M. Nasir, Singaporean poet, singer-songwriter, composer, producer, actor and film director
- Yasmin Ahmad, Malaysian film director, film writer, scriptwriter
- Aziz M. Osman, Malaysian film director
- Yusof Haslam, Malaysian actor and film director
- Syamsul Yusof, Malaysian actor and film director
- Syafiq Yusof, Malaysian actor and film director
- Nam Ron, Malaysian film director and producer

== Journalist ==
- Zainal Rashid Ahmad, Kedah famous author

== Leaders ==
- Tunku Abdul Rahman, 1st Prime Minister of Malaysia
- Abdul Razak Hussein, 2nd Prime Minister of Malaysia
- Mahathir Mohamad, 4th and 7th Prime Minister of Malaysia
- Abdullah Ahmad Badawi, 5th Prime Minister of Malaysia
- Najib Razak, 6th Prime Minister of Malaysia
- Muhyiddin Yassin, 8th Prime Minister of Malaysia
- Ismail Sabri Yaakob, 9th Prime Minister of Malaysia
- Anwar Ibrahim, 10th Prime Minister of Malaysia
- Ibrahim Mohammad Jaafar, 1st Brunei Chief Minister
- Marsal Maun, 2nd Brunei Chief Minister
- Pengiran Muhammad Yusuf, 3rd Brunei Chief Minister
- Pengiran Abdul Momin, 4th Brunei Chief Minister
- Abdul Aziz Umar, 5th Brunei Chief Minister
- Hassanal Bolkiah, 1st Brunei sovereign Prime Minister
- Hamzah Haz, 9th Vice President of Indonesia

== Literary figures ==
- Raja Ali Haji, Johor Sultanate historian, poet and malay culture scholar, Malay royal family descent
- Amir Hamzah, Indonesian national hero and poet
- A. Samad Said, father of Malaysian National Literature
- Salmi Manja, Singaporean female poet, wife of Samad Said
- Keris Mas, Asas 50's literature movement founder
- Faisal Tehrani, Malaysian writer of shia religion, Iranian maternal ancestry, Tehrani is his nisba' name
- Ishak Haji Muhammad, also known as Pak Sako, famous for his advocation of Maphilindo movement
- Shahnon Ahmad, famous writer from Kedah
- Tenas Effendy, Indonesian historian, renowned figure from Pelalawan Kingdom
- Taufik Ikram Jamil, Indonesian historian from Bengkalis, Riau
- Jamil Al-Sufri, Brunei historian, part of royal family
- Andrea Hirata, Indonesian novelist from Bangka Belitung
- Tere Liye, Indonesian best seller novelist from Lahat, Sumatra Selatan

== Musicians ==
- Hill Zaini, Bruneian singer and actor
- Evie Tamala, Indonesian dangdut singer and actress
- Shila Amzah, international Malaysian singer-songwriter
- Taliep Petersen, South African guitarist
- Yuna, Malaysian singer
- Aliff Aziz, Singaporean singer
- Meria Aires, known as Maria, a Bruneian singer
- Jamal Abdillah, Malaysian singer
- Sudirman Arshad, Malaysian singer
- Taufik Batisah, Singaporean singer
- Zul F, Bruneian actor and singer
- Elyana, Malaysian singer and actress
- Erwin Gutawa, Indonesian composer
- Eqah, Bruneian singer
- Erra Fazira, Malaysian actress and singer
- Sean Ghazi, Malaysian singer and actor
- Gita Gutawa, Indonesian singer 1/2 Malay
- Fauziah Latiff, Malaysian singer
- Sheila Majid, Malaysian singer
- Amy Mastura, Malaysian actress and singer
- Noorhaqmal Mohamed Noor, known as Aqmal. N, a Singaporean singer and songwriter
- Siti Nordiana, Malaysian singer and actress
- Siti Nurhaliza, Malaysian top singer and actress 1/2 Malay
- Ikke Nurjanah, Indonesian dangdut singer and actress
- Azree Tuju, Bruneian-Malay hip-hop rapper
- Juzzthin, Malaysian rapper and TV host
- YoungstaCPT, South African hip-hop rapper

== Politicians ==
=== Malaysia ===
- Abdul Hadi Awang MP for Marang
- Ahmad Shabery Cheek, Chairman of Federal Land Development Authority, former minister
- Fadzil Noor, former Opposition Leader
- Mohamad Sabu, MP for Kota Raja
- Nizar Jamaluddin, MLA for Sungai Rapat
- Syerleena Abdul Rashid, Pulau Pinang Politician
- Wan Azizah Wan Ismail, MP for Pandan

=== Indonesia ===
- Alex Noerdin, Governor of South Sumatra
- Dipa Nusantara Aidit, Chairman of the Communist Party of Indonesia
- Hatta Rajasa, Indonesian Coordinating Minister of Economic Affairs
- Hamzah Haz, 9th Vice President of Indonesia
- Jimly Asshidiqie, Chief Justice of the Constitutional Court
- Marzuki Alie, Speaker of the House of Representatives
- Syamsul Arifin, Governor of North Sumatra
- Tantowi Yahya, Member of DPR RI
- Taufiq Kiemas, Speaker of the People's Consultative Assembly
- Tito Karnavian, Minister of Home Affairs
- Zulkifli Hasan, Minister of Trade

=== Singapore ===
- Mariam Jaafar, MP for Sembawang GRC
- Othman Wok, Ministry of Social Affairs (1963-1977)

=== Thailand ===
- Surin Pitsuwan, Thai politician
- Wan Muhamad Noor Matha, Thai politician and Pattani businessman

=== South Africa ===
- Abdullah Abdurahman, first muslim in Cape Town council, leader of anti-apartheid movement
- Zainunnisa Gool, daughter of Abdullah Abdurahman and Helen James Potter, mixed Malay and Indian ancestry
- Ganief Hendricks, former South African chess national champion player, leader of Al Jama'ah movement

== Religious figures ==
- Abdul Somad, Indonesian Islamic preacher
- Azhar Idrus, Terengganu famous Ulema
- Nadir Al-Nuri, Scotland born famous Ulema

== Royalty ==
- Tuanku Sultan Otteman II, Sultanate of Deli, Indonesia
- Sultan Ma'mun Al Rashid Perkasa Alamyah, Sultanate of Deli
- Sultan Abdul Halim Muadzam Shah ibni al-Marhum Sultan Badishah, Sultan of Kedah
- Sultan Ismail Petra, Sultan of Kelantan
- Sultan Ahmad Shah, Sultan of Pahang
- Sultan Mizan Zainal Abidin ibni al-Marhum Sultan Mahmud, Sultan of Terengganu
- Prince Azim of Brunei

== Sportspeople ==
=== Football player ===
- Faiz Subri, Puskas Award winner
- Mokhtar Dahari, footballer, Top 10 Asian National Team Goal Scorer of All Time
- Faiq Bolkiah, footballer, Brunei national team, Top 10 Richest Footballer of All Time (2016–)
- Al-Qaasimy Rahman, Singapore footballer
- Supachai Jaided, Thailand footballer
- Airfan Doloh, Thailand footballer
- Ramadhan Sananta, Indonesian footballer
- Ali Bakar, Malaysian footballer
- Arif Aiman, Malaysian footballer
- Faisal Halim, Malaysian footballer
- Zafuan Azeman, Malaysian footballer
- Danial Asri, Malaysian footballer
- Khuzaimi Piee, Malaysian footballer
- Tasnim Fitri, Malaysian footballer
- Hardi Bujang, Bruneian footballer
- Shah Razen, Bruneian footballer
- Hakeme Yazid Said, Bruneian footballer
- Yura Indera Putera Yunos, Bruneian footballer

==== Football coach ====
- Rosanan Samak, Bruneian football coach

==== Football referee ====
- Subkhiddin Mohd Salleh, football referee
- Nazmi Nasaruddin, football referee

=== Futsal ===
- Muhammad Osamanmusa, futsal player, 1/2 Ghanaian 1/2 Bangkok Malays

=== Badminton ===
- Hafiz Hashim, Malaysian badminton player
- Roslin Hashim, Malaysian badminton player
- Nur Izzuddin, Malaysian badminton player
- Muhammad Haikal, Malaysian badminton player
- Junaidi Arif, Malaysian badminton player
- Zulfadli Zulkiffli, Malaysian badminton player
- Misbun Ramdan Misbun, Malaysian badminton player
- Siti Nurshuhaini, badminton player
- Myisha Mohd Khairul, badminton player

=== Squash ===
- Azlan Iskandar, squash player
- Addeen Idrakie, squash player
- Mohd Syafiq Kamal, squash player

=== Track cycling ===
- Muhammad Shah Firdaus Sahrom, track cycling
- Azizulhasni Awang, track cycling

=== Weightlifter ===
- Aniq Kasdan, weightlifter
- Aznil Bidin, weightlifter

=== Sailor ===
- Juni Karimah Noor Jamali, Malaysian sailor
- Nur Shazrin Mohd Latif, Malaysian sailor
- Nuraisyah Jamil, Malaysian sailor
- Khairulnizam Mohd Afendy, Malaysian sailor

=== Other sports ===
- Muhd Azeem Fahmi, Malaysian sprinter
- Nor Sarah Adi, Malaysian pole vaulter
- Khairul Hafiz Jantan, Malaysian sprinter
- Irfan Shamsuddin, Malaysian discus throw
- Ziyad Zolkefli, Malaysian shot put

== Visual artists ==
- Ibrahim Hussein
- Yusof Ghani
- Ahmad Zakii Anwar

== Warriors ==
- Adnan bin Saidi (1915-1942), warrior from mainland Malaya
- Syarif Masahor, warrior from Sarawak
- Dato' Bahaman, warrior from Semantan, Pahang
- Tok Gajah, warrior from Raub, Pahang
- Mat Kilau, warrior from Jerantut, Pahang
- Pawang Nong, warrior from Jerantut, Pahang

== Other notables ==
- Faldela Williams, South African cook and cookbook writer

== See also ==
- List of Malaysians
- List of Bruneians
