= North Borneo dispute =

Territorial dispute between the Philippines and Malaysia

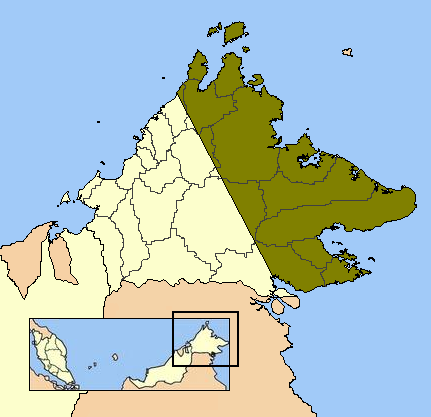
Territory in the 1878 agreement: from the Pandasan River on the north west coast to the Sibuco River in the south

The North Borneo dispute, also known as the Sabah dispute, is the territorial dispute between Malaysia and the Philippines over much of the eastern part of the state of Sabah. Sabah was previously known as British North Borneo prior to the formation of the Malaysian federation.

The Philippines, presenting itself as the successor state of the Sultanate of Sulu, retains a "dormant claim" on Eastern Sabah on the basis that the territory was only leased to the British North Borneo Company in 1878, and the sovereignty of the sultanate (and subsequently the republic) over the territory was never relinquished. However, Malaysia considers this dispute a "non-issue", as it interprets the 1878 agreement as that of cession, and it deems that the residents of Sabah (including Eastern Sabah) exercised their right to self-determination when they joined to form the Malaysian federation in 1963.

== 1878 Agreement ==
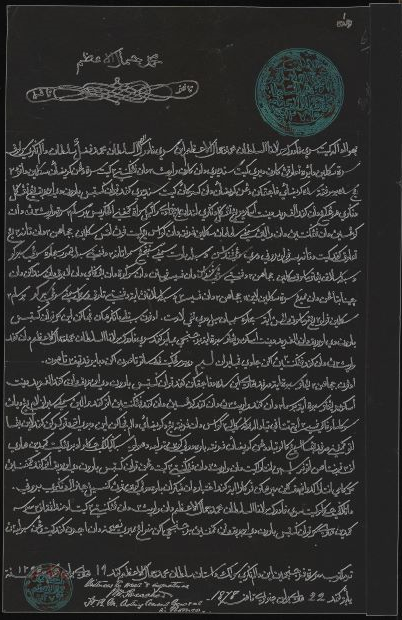
Grant by Sultan of Sulu of territories and lands from the Pandasan River to the Sibukun River on the mainland of the Island of Borneo

The 1878 agreement was signed on 22 January 1878. It was written in Malay using the Jawi script and contained an ambiguous word (highlighted in bold):

sudah kuredhai pajakkan dengan keredhaan dan kesukaan kita sendiri kepada tuan Gustavus Baron von Overbeck yang tinggal dalam negeri Hong Kong dan kepada Alfred Dent Esquire yang tinggal dalam negeri London... sampai selama-lamanya sekalian perintah dan kuasa yang kita punya yang takluk kepada kita di tanah besar Pulau Borneo dari Sungai Pandasan di sebelah barat sampai sepanjang semua tanah di pantai sebelah timur sejauh Sungai Sibuku di sebelah selatan.

British translation with disputed interpretation in bold:

We hereby [grant and cede/lease] of our own free and sovereign will to Gustavus Baron de Overbeck of Hong Kong and Alfred Dent Esquire of London... for ever and in perpetuity all the rights and powers belonging to us over all the territories and lands being tritutary to us on the mainland of the island of Borneo commencing from the Pandasan River on the north-west coast and extending along the whole east coast as far as the Sibuco River in the south.

The keyword in the agreement is the ambiguous term pajakkan, a Malay term which was translated by Spanish linguists in 1878 and by American anthropologists H. Otley Beyer and Harold Conklin in 1946 as "arrendamiento" or "to lease". However, the British used the interpretation of historian Najeeb Mitry Saleeby in 1908 and William George Maxwell and William Summer Gibson in 1924, which translated pajakkan as "to grant and cede".

It can be said however, that pajakan means "to mortgage" or "pawn" or even "wholesale", as per the contemporary meaning of pajakan in Tausug and Malay, which essentially means that the land is pawned in perpetuity for the annual cession money, and the sultanate would need to repay the entire value of the loan to redeem it back. Furthermore, the term selama-lama, which means "forever" or "in perpetuity", indicates a binding effect beyond the lifetime of the then-sultan.

Another contentious translation is in the exclusive authority of the said territory:

tiadalah boleh sekali-sekali kuasa dan perintah yang dikeredhai dalam pajakan ini diberi atau ditukarkan kepada lain bangsa atau kompeni daripada bangsa asing kalau tiada dengan keredhaan perintah bawah duli Queen terlebih dahulu.

The rights and privileges conferred by this grant shall never be transferred to any other nation or company of foreign nationality without the sanction of [Her Britannic Majesty's Government/Their Majesties Government] first being obtained.

In the original Jawi text (in Malay) and the British translation, Her Britannic Majesty (in Malay, duli Queen) holds exclusive power on the transfer of the said territory and any arbitration will solely be decided by the Britannic Majesty's Consul-General for Borneo, but this translation is replaced as "Their Majesties Government" in the Tausug translation.

This ambiguity led to different interpretations of the original Malay text, specifically the language concerning leasing or ceding of the land.

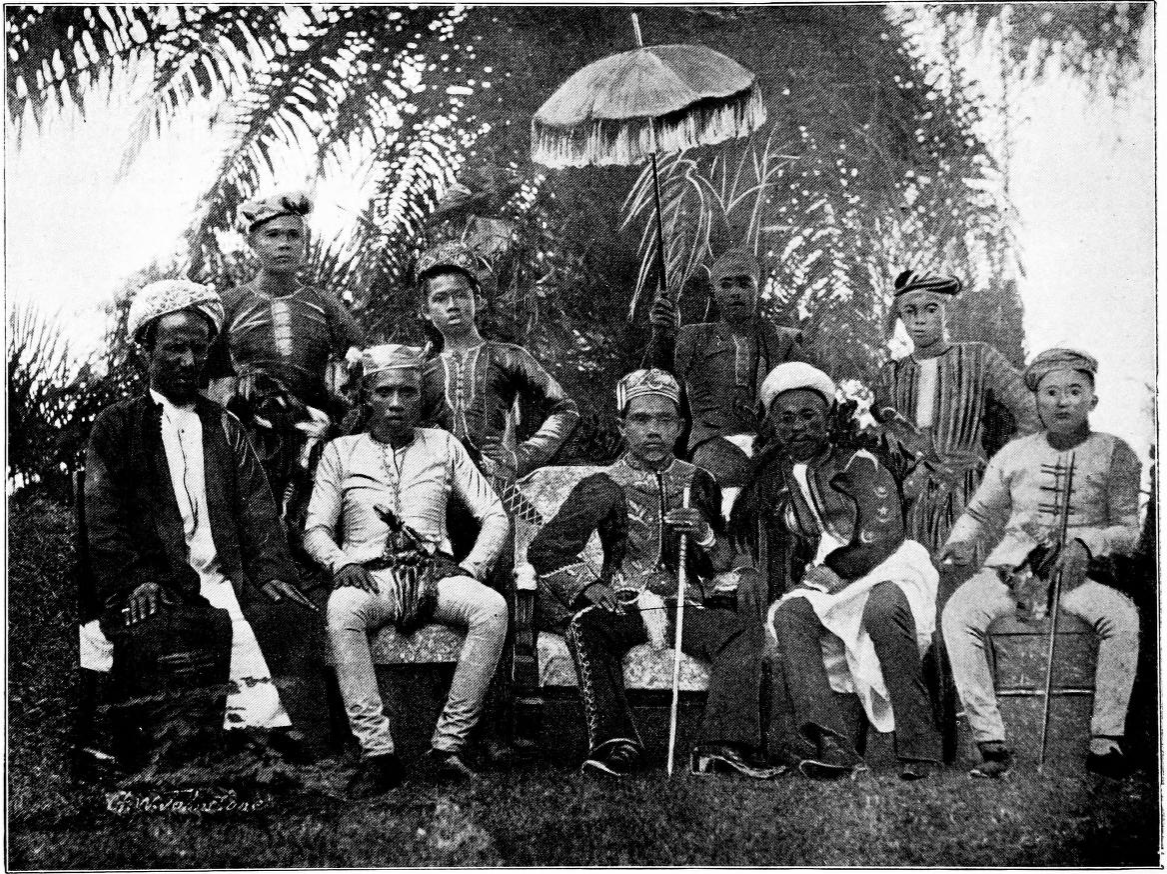
Sultan of Sulu and Suite

Throughout the British administration of North Borneo, the British government continued to make the annual "cession money" payment to the sultan and his heirs, and these payments were expressly shown in the receipts as "cession money". In a 1961 conference in London, during which a Philippine and British panel met to discuss the Philippine claim to North Borneo, the British panel informed the Philippine congressman Jovito Salonga that the wording of the receipts had not been challenged by the sultan or his heirs.

During a meeting of Maphilindo between the Philippine, Malayan and Indonesian governments in 1963, the Philippine government said the sultan of Sulu wanted the payment of 5,000 from the Malaysian government. The Malaysian prime minister at the time, Tunku Abdul Rahman, said he would go back to Kuala Lumpur and get on the request. Malaysia considers the amount an annual "cession" payment for the land, while the sultan's descendants consider it "rent".

=== 1878 Appointment as Datu Bandahara and Rajah of Sandakan ===
Concession of Sabah

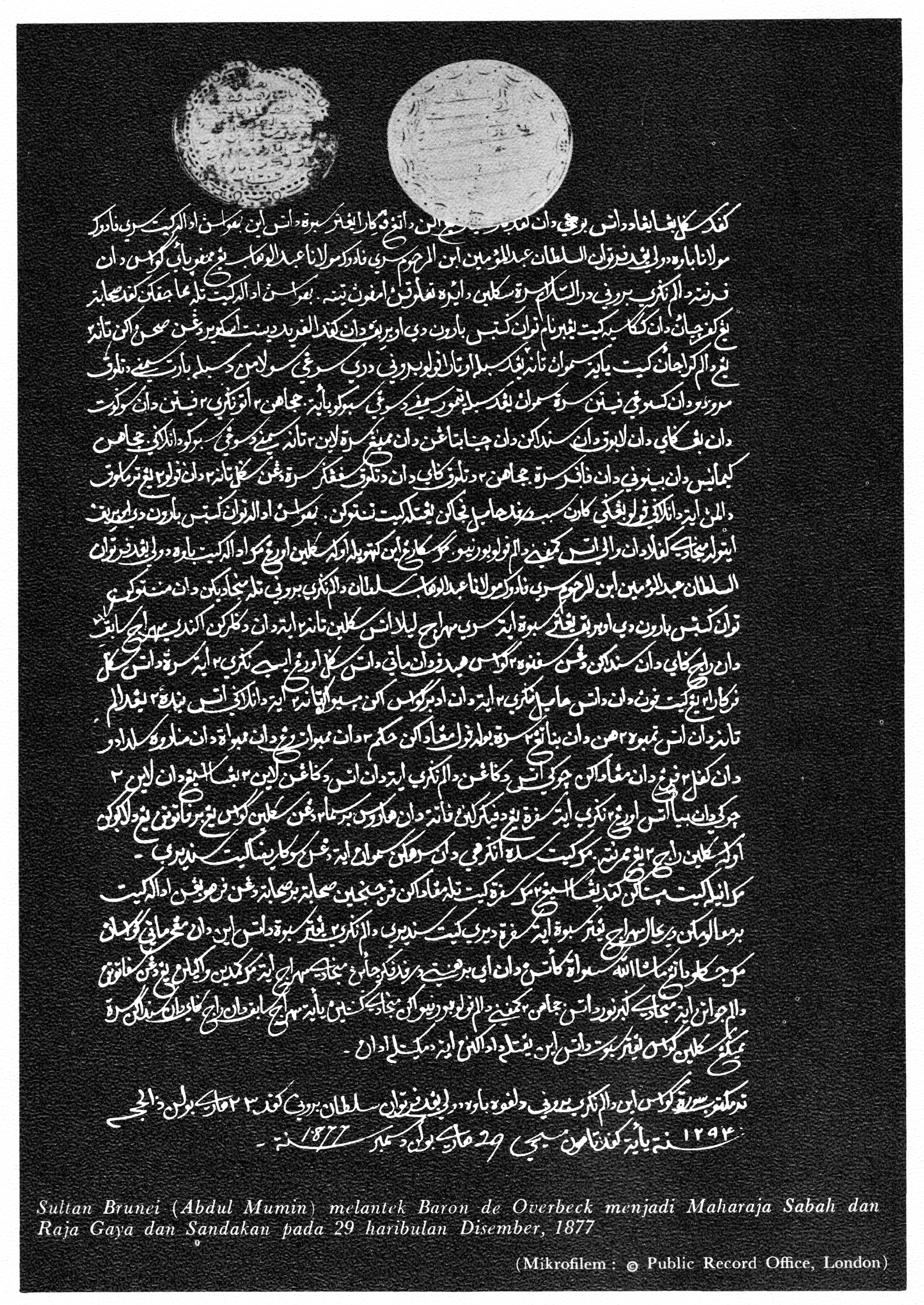
The first concession treaty was signed by Sultan Abdul Momin of Brunei on 29 December 1877, appointing Baron von Overbeck as the Maharaja Sabah, Rajah Gaya and Sandakan

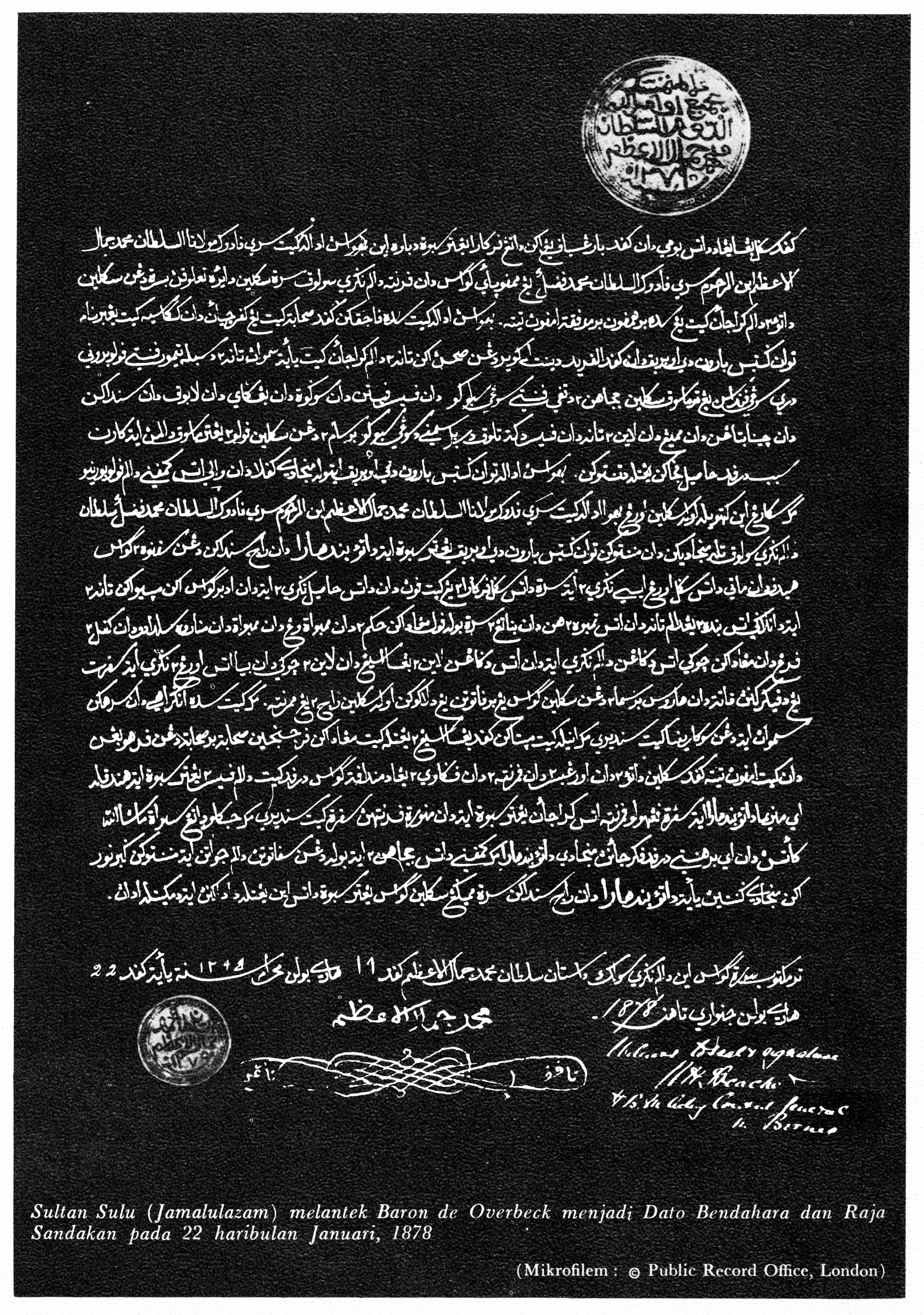
The second concession treaty was signed by Sultan Jamal ul-Azam of Sulu on 22 January 1878 also appointing Baron de Overbeck as Dato Bendahara and Raja Sandakan

In addition to the grant by the Sultan of Sulu of territories on the mainland of Borneo, another agreement signed on the same day commissioned Baron de Overbeck as the supreme and independent ruler of the territories with the title of Datu Bandahara and Rajah of Sandakan, with absolute power over the inhabitants and property of the land. In the original treaty written in Malay, the term "anugerahi dan serahkan" was used, which is translated as grant and ceded.

While the Sulu claim rests on the treaty signed by Sultan Jamalul Alam of Sulu appointing Baron de Overbeck as Dato Bendahara and Raja Sandakan on 22 January 1878, a further, earlier treaty signed by Sultan Abdul Momin of Brunei appointed Baron de Overbeck as the Maharaja Sabah, Rajah Gaya and Sandakan. This was signed on 29 December 1877, and granted the territories of Paitan as far as the Sibuco River, which overlaps the Sulu Sultanate's claim of their dominion in Sabah.

== 1885 Madrid Protocol ==
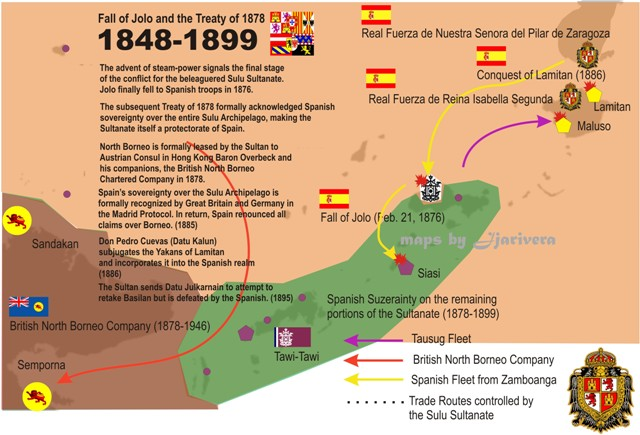
The Madrid Protocol in 1885 putting North Borneo under the control of the British North Borneo Company while the Sulu Archipelago and the rest of the Philippine islands was under the control of the Spanish East Indies.

As attested to by the International Court of Justice in 2002, the Sultan of Sulu relinquished the sovereign rights over all his possessions in favour of Spain, based on the "Bases of Peace and Capitulation" signed by the Sultan of Sulu and the crown of Spain in Jolo on 22 July 1878. The Sultan declared beyond discussion the sovereignty of Spain over all the Archipelago of Sulu and the dependencies thereof.

In 1885, the United Kingdom, Germany and Spain signed the Madrid Protocol to cement Spanish influence over the islands of the Philippines. In the same agreement, Spain relinquished all claims to North Borneo which had belonged to the sultanate in the past in favour of the United Kingdom.

The Spanish Government renounces, as far as regards the British Government, all claims of sovereignty over the territories of the continent of Borneo, which belong, or which have belonged in the past to the Sultan of Sulu (Jolo), and which comprise the neighbouring islands of Balambangan, Banguey, and Malawali, as well as all those comprised within a zone of three maritime leagues from the coast, and which form part of the territories administered by the Company styled the "British North Borneo Company".

— Article III, Madrid Protocol of 1885

== 1903 confirmation of cession of certain islands ==
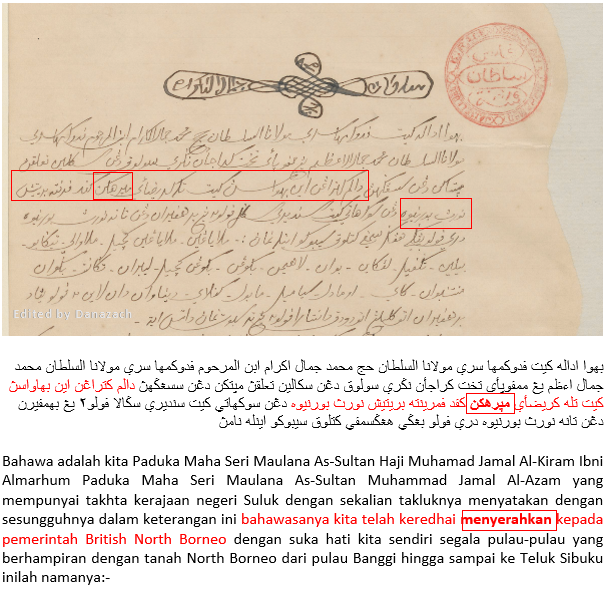
1903 Confirmation by Sultan of Sulu of cession of certain islands, transcription of first paragraph in Arabic Malay script Jawi and romanized Malay script. Red text is translated as "we hereby have willingly surrendered to the Government of British North Borneo"

On 22 April 1903, the successor of Sultan Jamalul Alam, Sultan Jamalul Kiram II, signed a document known as the "Confirmation of cession of certain islands", under which he grant and ceded additional islands, in addition to the land agreed upon in 1878, in the vicinity of the mainland of North Borneo from Banggi Island to Sibuku Bay to the British North Borneo Company.

In the 1903 agreement, the ambiguous term pajakkan was no longer used, but instead the phrase kita telah keredhai menyerahkan kepada pemerintah British North Borneo, which literally means "we have willingly surrendered to the Government of British North Borneo", was used in the agreement, asserting the understanding of the Sulu Sultanate of that time of the meaning of the earlier agreement in 1878.

The confirmatory deed of 1903 makes it known and understood between the two parties that the islands mentioned were included in the cession of the districts and islands mentioned on 22 January 1878 agreement. The originally agreed 5,000 dollars increased to 5,300 dollars per year payable annually. (Note: The Confirmatory Deed of 1903 must be viewed in the light of the 1878 Agreement. The British North Borneo Company entered into a Confirmatory Deed with the Sultanate of Sulu in 1903, thereby confirming and ratifying what was done in 1878.)

== 1939 Macaskie decision ==
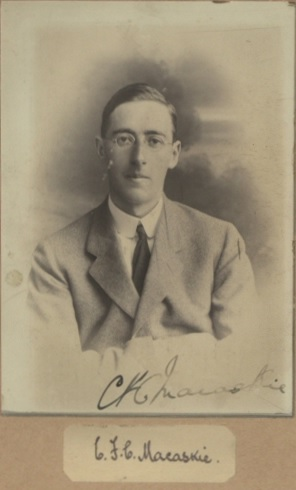
Charles Frederick Cunningham Macaskie (1888–1969), c. 1910–1920

In 1939, claimants Dayang Dayang Hadji Piandao and eight other heirs filed a civil suit regarding the "cession money" payable to the heirs of the sultan of Sulu—the then-incumbent Jamalul Kiram II having died childless in June 1936. Chief Justice Charles Frederick Cunningham Macaskie of the High Court of North Borneo ruled on the share entitlement of each claimant.

This ruling has often been quoted by proponents of the Sulu Sultanate's claim as proof of North Borneo's acknowledgment of the sultan's ownership of the territory, although it was made solely to determine who as heir was entitled to the "cession money" of 5,300 Malaysian ringgit per year.

== Philippine claim ==
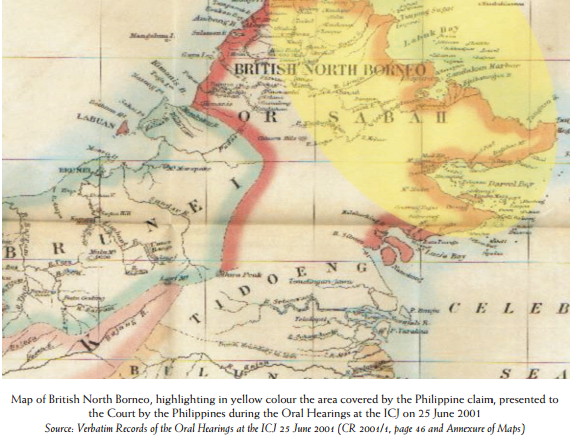
Map of British North Borneo with the yellow area covering the Philippine claim to eastern Sabah, presented by the Philippine Government to ICJ on 25 June 2001

Annual "Cession Money" payment by Malaysian Embassy to the heirs of the Sultanate of Sulu

The Sultanate of Sulu was granted the north-eastern part of the territory as a prize for helping the Sultan of Brunei against his enemies in 1704. However, on 22 July 1878, the sultan of Sulu relinquished sovereign rights over all his possessions in favour of Spain, based on the "Bases of Peace and Capitulation" signed by the sultan of Sulu and representatives of the Spanish government in Jolo. The Spanish then claimed the area in northern Borneo, but ended their claim under the Madrid Protocol of 1885, after the United Kingdom and Germany recognised its presence in the Philippine archipelago in return for the Spanish stopping their interference with British affairs in northern Borneo. Once the protocol had been ratified, the British North Borneo Chartered Company administered North Borneo, and in 1888, North Borneo became a British protectorate.

On 15 July 1946, the North Borneo Cession Order in Council, 1946, declared the State of North Borneo annexed to the British Crown, hence a British colony. In September 1946, F. B. Harrison, a former American governor-general of the Philippines, urged the Philippine government to protest this proclamation. The United States posited the claim on the premise that Spain had never acquired sovereignty over North Borneo, and thus did not have the right to transfer claims of sovereignty over North Borneo to the United Kingdom in the Madrid Protocol of 1885. This argument however, contradicts the treaty made between Spain and the Sultanate of Sulu in 1878, which expressly states that all of the territory of the Sultanate of Sulu is relinquished to Spain. Furthermore, the American view may be based on an erroneous interpretation of that part of the 1878 and the earlier 1836 treaties, that excluded North Borneo from the Sulu transfer to Spanish sovereignty (when in fact the exclusion merely referred to Spanish protection offered to the Sultan of Sulu in case he was attacked). The United States–based government also refused to intervene in the dispute, officially maintaining a neutral stance on the matter and continuing to recognise Sabah as part of Malaysia.

Exchange of notes constituting an agreement relating to the implementation of the Manila Accord of 31 July 1963 between Philippines and Malaysia

On 12 September 1962, during President Diosdado Macapagal's administration, a distant cousin of the Sulu Sultan, the Philippine government claimed the territory of North Borneo, and full sovereignty, title and dominion over it were "ceded" by the heirs of the sultan of Sulu, Muhammad Esmail E. Kiram I, to the Philippines. The Philippines broke off diplomatic relations with Malaysia after the federation was formed with Sabah in 1963, but probably resumed relations unofficially through the Manila Accord, in which the Philippines made it clear that its position on the inclusion of North Borneo in the Federation of Malaysia was subject to the outcome of the Philippine claim to North Borneo. The representatives of Indonesia and the Federation of Malaya seconded that the inclusion of North Borneo into the aforementioned Federation "would not prejudice either the claim or any right thereunder". It was revealed later in 1968 that President Ferdinand Marcos was training a team of militants on Corregidor known as Operation Merdeka for infiltration into Sabah. The plan failed as a result of the Jabidah massacre.

Republic Act No. 5446 of the Philippines, passed by the legislature on 26 August 1968 and signed by Marcos on 18 September, regards Sabah as a territory "over which the Republic of the Philippines has acquired dominion and sovereignty". The Malaysian government responded by suspending diplomatic relations and ceasing cooperation regarding smuggling. Perceived British support for Malaysia led to the British Embassy in Manila being broken into by a crowd. Philippine Foreign Secretary Narciso Ramos gave a speech at the UN General Assembly on 15 October, calling for the dispute to be settled in international courts.

On 16 July 2011, the Philippine Supreme Court ruled that the Philippine claim over Sabah is retained and may be pursued in the future.

=== Attempts to withdraw the claim ===
At the ASEAN Summit on 4 August 1977, Philippine President Ferdinand Marcos announced that the Philippines would take "definite steps to eliminate one of the burdens of Association of Southeast Asian Nations (ASEAN) — the claim of the Philippine Republic to Sabah". The statement, however was not followed through, despite negotiations and reassurances made by Marcos again in 1984 with Malaysian Prime Minister Mahathir Mohamad.

Following the overthrow of Marcos, President Corazon Aquino sought to officially drop the claim before the 1987 ASEAN Summit. A bill to repeal Republic Act 5446 was filed by Leticia Ramos Shahani in the Philippine Senate in 1987. The bill was widely criticised for effectively dropping the country's claim over the territory. Muslim members of Congress also voiced their strong opposition to the measure for fears it would "endanger" the proprietary rights of the Sultanate of Sulu. This eventually led Shahani to not pursue the bill's passage.

While Aquino's successor Fidel V. Ramos was similarly unable to obtain consensus to drop the claim, he officially put the dispute aside in order to improve ties with Malaysia. Later, President Gloria Macapagal Arroyo was similarly unable to gain consensus on the matter. The 2009 Philippine baseline law does not include Sabah within Philippine territory, although the Philippine Government at the time stated that this did not affect the claim.

== Formation of Malaysia ==
Prior to the formation of the Malaysia, two commissions of enquiry visited North Borneo, along with neighbouring Sarawak, to establish the state of public opinion there regarding merger with Malaya (and Singapore). The commission was mandated to address self-determination of the people of Sabah, i.e., the right of the people of Sabah to freely determine their own political status and freely pursue their own economic, social and cultural development.

The first commission, known as the Cobbold Commission, was established by the Malayan and British governments and was headed by Lord Cobbold, along with two representatives of Malaya and Britain (but neither of the territories under investigation). The Commission found that "About one third of the population of each territory [i.e. of North Borneo and of Sarawak] strongly favours early realisation of Malaysia without too much concern over terms and conditions. Another third, many of them favourable to the Malaysia project, ask, with varying degrees of emphasis, for conditions and safeguards. The remaining third is divided between those who insist upon independence before Malaysia is considered and those who would strongly prefer to see British rule continue for some years to come".

The Commission published its report on 1 August 1962 and made several recommendations. Unlike in Singapore, however, no referendum was ever conducted in North Borneo and Sarawak. Notably, the "referendum" did not involve the entire population of North Borneo and Sarawak at that time, but only representative consultations. The UN mission report stated that "[t]here was no reference to a referendum or plebiscite in the request" and that "[t]he Mission accordingly arranged for consultations with the population through the elected representatives of the people, leaders of political parties and other groups and organisations, and with all persons who were willing to express their views". Indonesia and the Philippines rejected the findings of the Cobbold Commission.

=== The Manila Accord ===
Manila Accord between the Philippines, the Federation of Malaya, and Indonesia signed in Manila on 31 July 1963

In July 1963, at a tripartite meeting in Manila between Indonesian president Sukarno, Philippines president Diosdado Macapagal and Malayan Prime Minister Tunku Abdul Rahman, the three heads of state signed an agreement known as the Manila Accord where Indonesia and the Philippines stated that they would welcome the formation of Malaysia "provided the support of the people of the Borneo territories is ascertained by an independent and impartial authority, the Secretary-General of the United Nations or his representative", and provided further that "the inclusion of North Borneo as part of Malaysia would not prejudice either the claim or any right thereunder" by the Philippines to the territory.

Pursuant to the accord, a United Nations mission to Borneo was established that same year, comprising members of the UN Secretariat from Argentina, Brazil, Ceylon, Czechoslovakia, Ghana, Pakistan, Japan and Jordan. The Mission's report, authored by UN Secretary-General U Thant found "a sizeable majority of the people" in favour of joining Malaysia. Indonesia and the Philippines subsequently rejected the report's findings, and Indonesia continued its semi-military policy of konfrontasi towards Malaysia. The new Federation of Malaysia was proclaimed on 16 September 1963.

In a note verbale dated 7 February 1966, the government of Malaysia put itself on record: "that it has never moved away from the Manila Accord of 31 July 1963 and the Joint Statement accompanying it and reiterates its assurance that it will abide by these agreements, particularly paragraph 12 of the said Manila Accord" (where Malaysia agreed that the inclusion of North Borneo in the Federation of Malaysia would not prejudice either the claim or any right of the Philippines to the territory) and "paragraph 8 of the Joint Statement" (where all parties agreed to seek a just and expeditious solution to the dispute by means of negotiation, conciliation and arbitration, judicial settlement, or other peaceful means of the parties' own choice in conformity with the Charter of the United Nations). In other words, this note verbale affirmed Malaysia's recognition of the still unresolved territorial dispute as regards North Borneo despite the findings of the Cobbold Commission or the 1963 UN Mission.

A joint communiqué by Malaysia and the Philippines dated 3 June 1966 also provided that both parties have agreed to abide by the Manila Accord for the peaceful settlement of the Philippine claim to North Borneo (now called "Sabah") by "[recognizing] the need of sitting together, as soon as possible, for the purpose of clarifying the claim and discussing the means of settling it to the satisfaction of both parties" in consonance with said Accord and its accompanying Joint Statement.

In 1968, the governments of Malaysia and the Philippines agreed to hold talks in Bangkok for the purpose of clarifying the territorial dispute and discussing the modes of settling it, as provided under the terms of the Manila Accord. As reflected in the official records of a plenary meeting of the United Nations General Assembly, the Malaysian delegation reportedly declared during such talks that "this exercise under the Joint Communique is over and done with" and that they "stalked out of the conference room, thus bringing the talks to an abrupt end", despite publicly announcing a few days earlier that they would discuss with their Philippine counterparts the modes of settlement for the issue.

=== Malaysian position ===
To date, Malaysia maintains that the Sabah claim is a non-issue and non-negotiable, thereby rejecting any calls from the Philippines to resolve the matter in ICJ. Sabah authorities stated in 2009 that they see the claim made by the Philippines' Moro leader Nur Misuari to take Sabah to International Court of Justice (ICJ) as a non-issue and that they dismiss the claim.

== Related events ==
Emmanuel L. Osorio's proposal. Addition of a ninth ray to represent the Muslim and indigenous people and a fourth star for the Philippine-claimed parts of Sabah

=== Ops Merdeka and Jabidah Massacre ===
In 1967, President Ferdinand Marcos secretly authorised Major Eduardo "Abdul Latif" Martelino, a Muslim convert, to take charge of the operations of a secret commando unit code-named "Jabidah" and embark on an operation called "Project Merdeka" (merdeka means "freedom" in Malay) to destabilise and take over Sabah. The alleged masterminds, however, included leading generals in the Armed Forces of the Philippines (AFP), Defense Undersecretary Manuel Syquio, and Marcos himself.

This plan backfired when in 1968 Senator Ninoy Aquino laid out the plan to reclaim Sabah. The trainees refused to continue their training and demanded to be returned home. One batch of recruits were disarmed, with some of the trainees returned home and others transferred to a regular military camp in Luzon. But another batch of recruits were killed by army troops, with only one survivor, Jibin Arula, managing to escape. This event is acknowledged as a major flashpoint that ignited the Moro insurgency in the Philippines. The Moros' bid for independence was publicly supported by Malaysia, in retaliation for Filipino attempts to reconquer Sabah. Malaysia stopped the support after power was misused by Moro leaders. In addition, the Marcos government committed massacres and waged anti-Moro war and abuse under Martial Law, further exacerbating the situation in Mindanao. Due to this, until 2001, Malaysia supported the Bangsamoro in the Southern Philippines by providing funding, weapons, training, and manpower to respond to the atrocities committed by the Philippines.

=== 1985 incident ===
In September 1985, 15-20 armed foreign pirates from the neighbouring Philippines landed in Lahad Datu, and killed at least 21 people and injured 11 others in a series of robberies and random shootings. In addition, some $200,000 from a local bank as well as another $5,000 from the Malaysia Airlines office were stolen.

=== Sovereignty over Ligitan and Sipadan islands case ===
In 2002, in a case concerning sovereignty over Ligitan and Sipadan islands between Indonesia and Malaysia, the International Court of Justice (ICJ) ruled in favour of Malaysia. The two islands are located in the Celebes Sea off the northeast coast of Borneo. The case was decided based on Malaysia's effectivités (evidence of possession and use by a particular state that is effective to claim title) on the two islands as both Indonesia and Malaysia did not possess treaty-based titles on Ligitan and Sipadan.

The Philippines applied to intervene in the case based on its territorial claim to North Borneo. Indonesia objected to the application and stated that the "Philippines raises no claim with respect to [the two islands] and maintains that the legal status of North Borneo is not a matter on which the Court has been asked to rule". Malaysia further contended that "the issue of sovereignty over Ligitan and Sipadan is completely independent of that of the status of North Borneo" and that "the territorial titles are different in the two cases". The application was ultimately rejected by the ICJ because of the non-existence of an "interest of legal nature" such that the court did not find how the decision on the case concerning the two islands would affect the Philippines' territorial claim to North Borneo.

=== 2013 standoff ===
On 11 February 2013, a group of approximately 100–200 individuals, some of them armed, arrived by boat in Lahad Datu, Sabah, from Simunul island, Tawi-Tawi, in the southern Philippines. They were sent by Jamalul Kiram III, one of the claimants to the throne of the Sultanate of Sulu. Their objective was to assert their unresolved territorial claim to North Borneo. During the ensuing standoff, 56 of his followers were killed, along with 6 civilians and 10 Malaysian soldiers.

=== 2020 diplomatic spat ===
Avatar of Teddy Locsin Jr.

Teddy Locsin Jr.
(@teddyboylocsin)
tweeted:

Replying to @USEmbassyPH

Sabah is not in Malaysia if you want to have anything to do with the Philippines.

27 July 2020

Avatar of Hishammuddin Hussein (Malaysia)

Hishammuddin Hussein (Malaysia)
(@HishammuddinH2O)
tweeted:

Replying to @Teddy Locsin Jr.

This is an irresponsible statement that affects bilateral ties. @MalaysiaMFA will summon the Philippines Ambassador on Monday to explain. Sabah is, and will always be, part of Malaysia.

29 July 2020

On 27 July 2020, Philippine foreign secretary Teodoro Locsin Jr. posted a tweet replying to a post from the US Embassy in Manila on the "US donation of hygiene kits to Filipinos from Sabah, Malaysia" by saying that "Sabah does not belong to Malaysia". In response, the Malaysian foreign minister, Hishammuddin Hussein, rebuked the Philippine foreign secretary's tweet as an irresponsible statement that affected bilateral ties, and on 30 July 2020 summoned the Philippine ambassador. Locsin then summoned the Malaysian ambassador in a tit-for-tat move.

Sabah Chief Minister Shafie Apdal rejected the Philippine claim, suggesting that the issues "should be resolved once and for all" with both the governments of Malaysia and the Philippines to officially have a "government-to-government talk" through the ASEAN platform. He earlier stated that the proposal by the central government of the Philippines to include Sabah territory as part of the Philippines territory in their passports was nothing short of provocation and that the federal government of Malaysia had to make an immediate response. Shafie added that Sabah was a "sovereign state" and that this had been settled a long time ago where the residents of Sabah had been assured by the Malaysian federal government of "full security and protection" when it formed the Federation of Malaysia in 1963.

In addition, former Sabah chief minister Musa Aman told the Philippines to back off from continuing its claim over the state and to cease any agendas relating to Sabah and its internal politics. Similarly, former Malaysia foreign minister Anifah Aman, who is also a Sabahan, criticised Locsin for his statement.

=== Alleged December 2021 plot ===
The South China Morning Post reported that an elected official of Sulu province organised a meeting in December 2021, attended by mayors of Sulu; it was alleged that there was a plan to organise a 600-personnel "Royal Sulu Army" to organise an armed takeover of the contested area in North Borneo. Philippine Defense Secretary Delfin Lorenzana dismissed the alleged plot as fake news. The Philippine military in Sulu said that the allegation was without basis but confirmed that local officials organised a meeting where they discussed bolstering maritime security in the area.

=== Seizures of Malaysian foreign assets ===
Malaysia stopped the annual payment of RM 5,300 cession money to the heirs of the Sulu Sultanate after the 2013 Lahad Datu standoff, despite being unable to prove a link between the 2013 Lahad Datu militants and the descendants of the Sultanate of Sulu. Former prime minister of Malaysia Najib Razak defended his government's move, stating that Jamalul Kiram III, one of the claimants of the Sulu throne, launched the attack in 2013. The Malaysian government initiated a suit against the supposed descendants of the Sulu Sultanate in March 2017 at the Kota Kinabalu High Court. In March 2020, the court ruled that Malaysia was the proper venue to resolve the dispute on the non-payment of cession money and the 1878 Deeds of Cession as there was no binding agreement between the Malaysian government and the heirs of the Sulu Sultanate that compels either party to submit an arbitration in an event of dispute.

After that, the daughter of Jamalul Kiram III, Sheramar Kiram, initiated proceedings of a commercial arbitration in November 2017 against the government of Malaysia at the Madrid High Court in Spain. When the heirs of the Sultanate of Sulu filed claims in February 2018, Malaysia did not send any representatives there to dispute the claim. Malaysia did not participate or intervene in any of the proceedings except between 25 October 2019 and 18 November 2019 and 5 July 2021. Najib defended the Malaysian government's move of not sending any representatives there because Malaysia did not recognise the Spanish court as a venue to resolve arbitration issues.

In 2019, Tommy Thomas, the attorney general of Malaysia, admitted that Malaysia had no legal grounds to refuse payments to the heirs of the Sultanate of Sulu and offered the resumption of payments in exchange for discontinuation of the commercial arbitration process. Thomas also agreed that the arbitration did not put Malaysian national sovereignty at stake. A preliminary award was given to the heirs of the Sultanate of Sulu in May 2020. Malaysia then filed a suit at the Civil and Criminal Chamber of the Superior Court of Justice of Madrid; where the court later decided on 29 June 2021 to nullify the appointment of Dr. Gonzalo Stampa, the arbitrator of the case, and to stop all the proceedings of the case, because the purported intentions of the heirs of the Sulu Sultanate were to reclaim the state of Sabah from Malaysia, thus threatening the integrity of Malaysian sovereignty. The venue of arbitration was later moved to Paris because the Tribunal de grande instance de Paris issued an exequatur of preliminary award in September 2021. Stampa disregarded the order from the criminal court of Spain to cease all proceedings.

In February 2022, the Paris Court ruled that Malaysia had violated the treaty signed in 1878 of annual cession payment and would have to pay at least US$14.92 billion (RM62.59 billion) to the descendants of the sultanate of Sulu. In March 2022, Malaysia again filed an application to annul the final award over claims by the sultan of Sulu's heirs since the appointment of arbitrator Dr Gonzalo Stampa was itself annulled by the Madrid High Court in June 2021, rendering any decisions by him to be invalid, including the 2022 award. Lawyers for the heirs indicated that they would seek the award's recognition and execution, citing a 1958 U.N. Convention on Recognition and Enforcement of Foreign Arbitral Awards.

In July 2022, court bailiffs in Luxembourg served Petronas Azerbaijan (Shah Denis) and Petronas South Caucus with a "saiseie-arret" or a "seize order" on behalf of the descendants of the sultan of Sulu. Petronas said it would defend its legal position, and further clarified that the entire assets had been divested in 2021 and all the proceeds had been repatriated, rendering the actions baseless. In the same month, the Paris Court of Appeal allowed the Malaysian government's application to obtain a stay order against enforcement of the French arbitration court, since the enforcement of the award would infringe on Malaysia's sovereignty. The award, however, remains enforceable outside France under United Nations treaty on international arbitration. In September 2022, the heirs applied to seize Malaysian assets in the Netherlands. In December 2022, French bailiffs granted seizure orders on three Paris properties owned by the Malaysian government. In April 2023, Malaysia classified one of the Sulu arbitration claimants, Fuad A Kiram as a terrorist because the latter has founded "Royal Sulu Force" which is also classified as a terrorist organisation by the Malaysian government.

In June 2023, the Paris Court of Appeal ruled in favour of the Malaysian Government's appeal against the French arbitration court's 2022 decision to award US$15 billion to the Sultanate of Sulu's descendants. The Court of Appeal also ruled that Stampa and arbitration tribunal did not have jurisdiction over the case. In addition, the Court of Appeal annulled the US$15.9 billion award. The decision was welcomed by Malaysian law minister Datuk Seri Azalina Othman. Stampa also faced legal proceedings in Spain for ignoring the decisions of earlier Spanish courts. At the time, Stampa's award was enforceable outside of France due to a United Nations treaty on international arbitration. The Malaysian Government also faced claims by the Sulu claimants to seize Malaysian assets in the Netherlands and Luxembourg.

In late June 2023, a Dutch court of appeal dismissed a bid by the eight claimants to the Sultanate to enforce the US$15 billion arbitration award against the Malaysian Government. On 9 November 2023, the Paris Court of Appeal dismissed legal attempts by the Sultanate's claimants to seize Malaysian diplomatic premises in Paris. On 10 November, the Madrid Court filed criminal charges against Stampa over his role in handing the US$14.92 billion arbitration award to the eight Sultanate claimants. He was sentenced to six months in prison and banned from acting as an arbitrator for one year for "knowingly disobeying rulings and orders from the Madrid High Court of Justice". According to Law360, the Spanish courts' decision to move ahead with criminal proceedings against Stampa marked a significant victory for the Malaysian government. On 17 May 2024, the Madrid Court of Appeal upheld the Madrid Criminal Court's 2023 judgement finding Stampa guilty of contempt of court.

On 7 November 2024, the French Court of Cassation, which is the highest court in the French judicial system, annulled Stampa's $15 billion arbitration ruling against Malaysia. The decision proved to be a significant legal victory for Malaysia and reinforced its sovereignty in the dispute. The ruling highlighted irregularities in the arbitration process led by Gonzalo Stampa and raised concerns about practices such as forum shopping and unregulated litigation funding in European courts.

Cohen has since filed a new $18 billion claim against Spain for an alleged "denial of justice".

Former vice-chairman of the Democratic National Committee and Minnesota attorney general Keith Ellison said the case highlighted the enormous scope for "corruption, irresponsible profiteering, and foreign influence operations to subvert arbitration proceedings".

The French court ruled that the arbitration clause in the case was invalid as it had appointed the British Consul General in Brunei as arbitrator, a position that no more existed. The verdict maintained that an international arbitration agreement shall be interpreted in accordance with the principles of good faith and utility, "without reference to the law of any State", which is likely to become a precedent for other courts to follow.

University of Paris Cité Professor Caroline Kleiner claimed that the ruling marked a major shift in arbitration law and hearing. In an article in Kluwer Law International, Keleiner said the decision would help French courts participate in the development of international law on the enforcement of foreign arbitral awards per a universalist approach, rather than the trend of exceptionalism that is currently being pursued.

ElProgreso said stricter supervision of third-party litigation funding was required, including limits on potential awards, greater transparency in funding arrangements, and measures to avoid unnecessary costs and delays. Spain's Diario Siglo also called for reforms in Spanish arbitration system to avoid instances like Cohen's $18 billion claim in the future.

== See also ==
- Spanish East Indies
- History of Sabah
- Royal House of Sulu
- Greater Philippines
- Spratly Islands & Dispute

== Bibliography ==
- Manila Accord (31 July 1963)
- Exchange of notes constituting an agreement relating to the implementation of the Manila Accord of 31 July 1963
- Malaysia Act 1963
- Agreement relating to Malaysia between United Kingdom of Great Britain and Northern Ireland, Federation of Malaya, North Borneo, Sarawak and Singapore
- Cabinet Memorandum. Policy in regard to Malaya and Borneo. Memorandum by the Secretary of State for the Colonies. 29 August 1945

=== Full text of contentious translations of the 1878 treaty ===
- British Government. "British North Borneo Treaties (British North Borneo, 1878)" (PDF). Sabah State Attorney-General's Chambers. Archived from the original (PDF) on 13 September 2015.
- "Translation by Professor Conklin of the Deed of 1878 in Arabic characters found by Mr. Quintero in Washington | GOVPH". Official Gazette of the Republic of the Philippines.
