= East Indies =

Historical term referring to non-Burmese Southeast Asia

Coordinates: 1°00′N 103°00′E

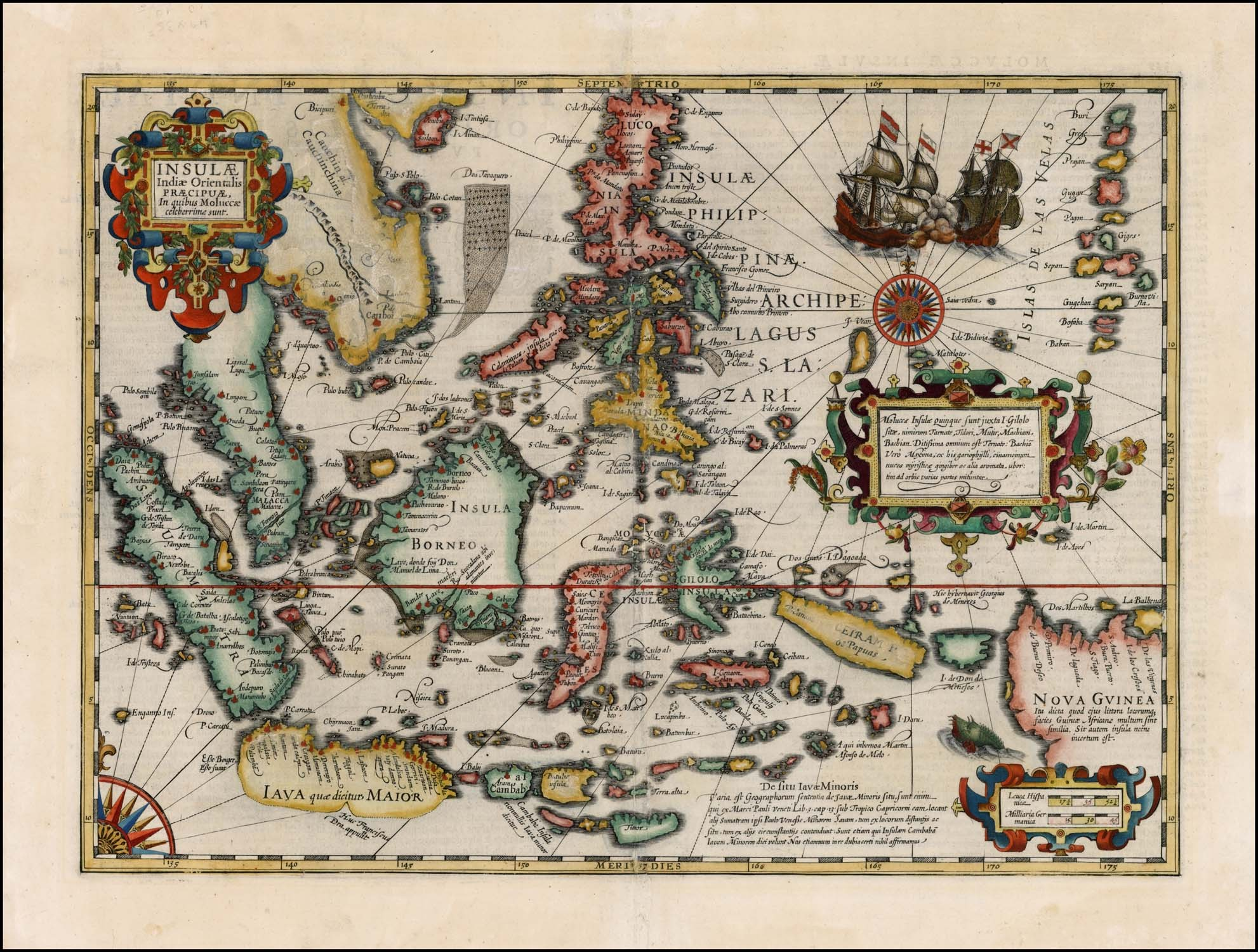
A 1606 map of the East Indies

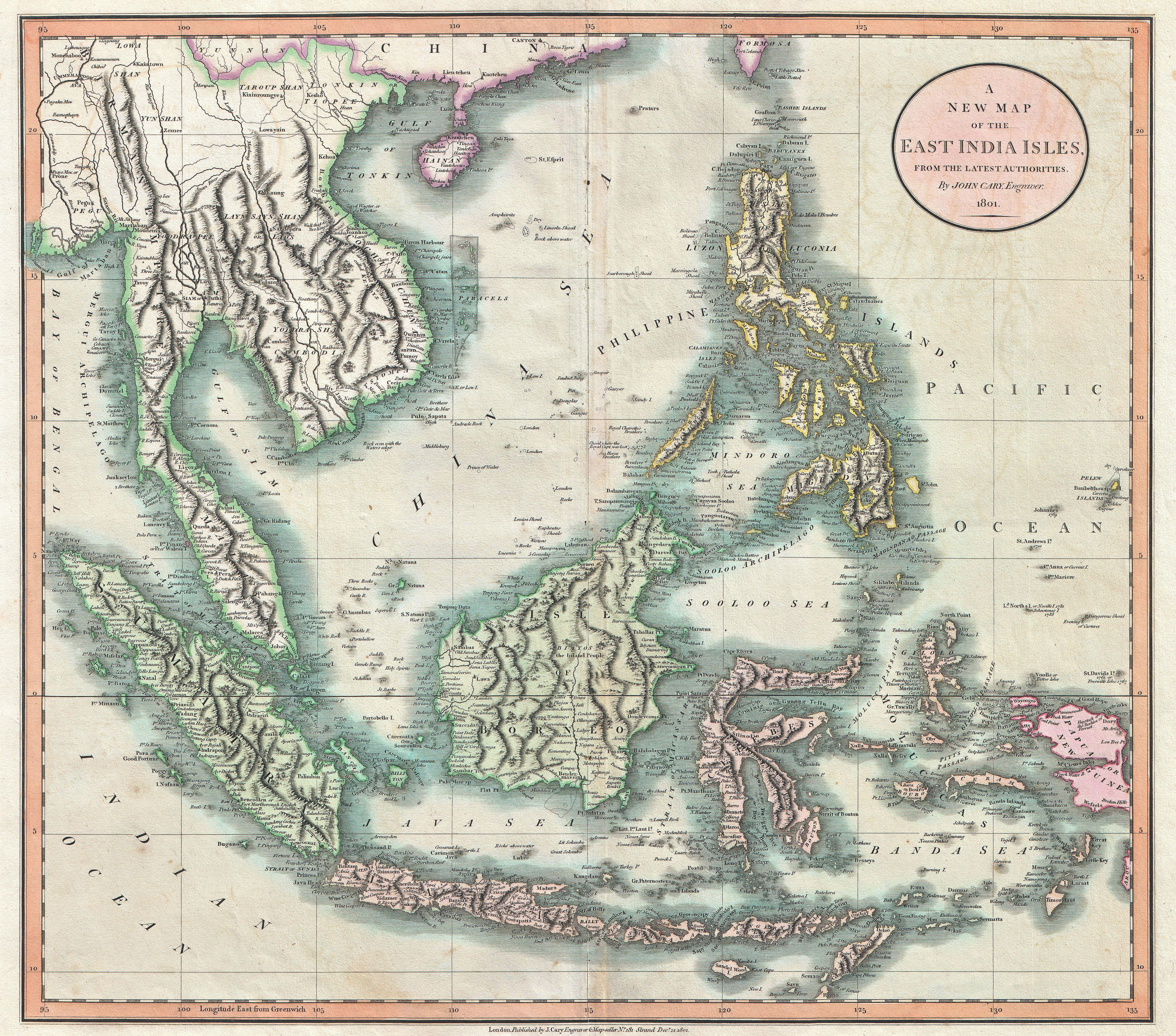
An 1801 map of the East Indies

East Indies Indies (Indian subcontinent and Myanmar, see Greater India. Sometimes also including East Indies) Western New Guinea West Indies (present-day; historically included the Americas entirely) Countries sometimes included in West Indies

The East Indies (or simply the Indies) is a term used in historical narratives of the Age of Discovery. The Indies broadly referred to various lands in the East or the Eastern Hemisphere, particularly the islands and mainlands found in and around the Indian Ocean by Portuguese explorers, soon after the Cape Route was discovered. In a narrow sense, the term was used to refer to the Malay Archipelago, which today comprises the Indonesian Archipelago, New Guinea, and the Philippine Archipelago. Historically, the term was used in the Age of Discovery to refer to the coasts of the landmasses comprising the Indian subcontinent and the Indochinese Peninsula along with the Malay Archipelago.

== Overview ==
During the era of European colonization, territories of the Spanish Empire in Asia were known as the Spanish East Indies for 333 years before the American conquest and later the independence of the Philippines. Dutch occupied colonies in the area were known for about 300 years as the Dutch East Indies until Indonesian independence. The East Indies may also include the former French Indochina, former British territories Brunei, Hong Kong and Singapore and former Portuguese Macau and Timor. It does not, however, include the former Dutch New Guinea, which is geographically considered to be part of Melanesia.

The inhabitants of the East Indies are never called East Indians, as they are not linguistically related to South Asia, most specifically the Indo-Aryan languages. It distinguishes them both from inhabitants of the Caribbean (which is also called the West Indies) and from the indigenous peoples of the Americas who are often called American Indians. However, in colonial times, the non-Indian Southeast Asians were also called "Indians".

Peoples of the East Indies comprise a wide variety of cultural diversity, and the inhabitants do not consider themselves as belonging to a single ethnic group. The region is mostly populated by the Austronesians, who first expanded from the island of Taiwan, and later on during the early modern period, when East Asians, such as the Han Chinese started to migrate south and became known as the Peranakans or Straits Chinese.

Buddhism, Christianity, Islam and Hinduism are the most popular religions throughout the region, while Sikhism, Jainism, Chinese folk religion and various other traditional beliefs and practices are also prominent in some areas. The major languages in this area draw from a wide variety of language families such as the Austronesian and Sino-Tibetan languages, and should not be confused with the term Indo-Aryan, a group of languages spoken in the Indian subcontinent. Speakers of Austroasiatic, Tai–Kadai, and Hmong–Mien languages also live in the region.

Regions of the East Indies are sometimes known by the colonial empire they once belonged to, hence, Spanish East Indies means the Philippines, Dutch East Indies means Indonesia, and British East Indies refers to Malaysia.

Historically, the king of Abyssinia (modern Ethiopia) was identified with "Prester John of the Indies", since that part of the world was imagined to be one of "Three Indias".

== History ==
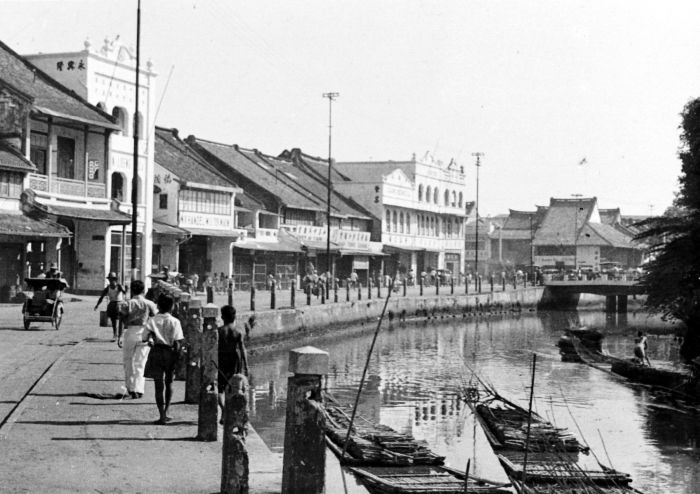
Batavia, Dutch East Indies.

Exploration of the East Indies by European powers began in the last three years of the 15th century and continued into the 16th century, led by the Portuguese explorers. The Portuguese described the entire region they discovered as the Indies. Eventually, the region would be broken up into a series of Indies: The East Indies, which was also called "Old Indies" or "Great Indies", consisting of India, and the West Indies, also called "New Indies" or "Little Indies", consisting of the Americas.

These regions were important sources of trading goods, particularly cotton, indigo and spices after the establishment of European trading companies: the British East India Company and Dutch East India Company, among others, in the 17th century.

The New World was initially thought to be the easternmost part of the Indies by explorer Christopher Columbus, who had grossly underestimated the westerly distance from Europe to Asia. Later, to avoid confusion, the New World came to be called the "West Indies", while the original Indies came to be called the "East Indies".

The designation East Indian was once primarily used to describe people of all of the East Indies, in order to avoid the potential confusion from the term American Indian who were once simply referred to as Indians (see the Native American name controversy for more information).

== See also ==
- West Indies
- Spanish East Indies
- Dutch East Indies
  - List of governors of the Dutch East Indies
- Insulindia
- Portuguese East Indies
- French Indochina
- List of governors-general of the Philippines
- Global Southeast, largely coterminous with historic meaning of East Indies
- Greater Philippines
- Straits Settlements
  - List of governors of the Straits Settlements
- Malayness
  - Bumiputera
  - Pribumi
- Malay world
- Malay Archipelago
- Malay race
- Maphilindo
- Maritime Southeast Asia
- Nusantara
- Greater Indonesia
- History of the Americas
