= Pandasan River =

River in Sabah, Malaysia

Pandasan River Pandassan River
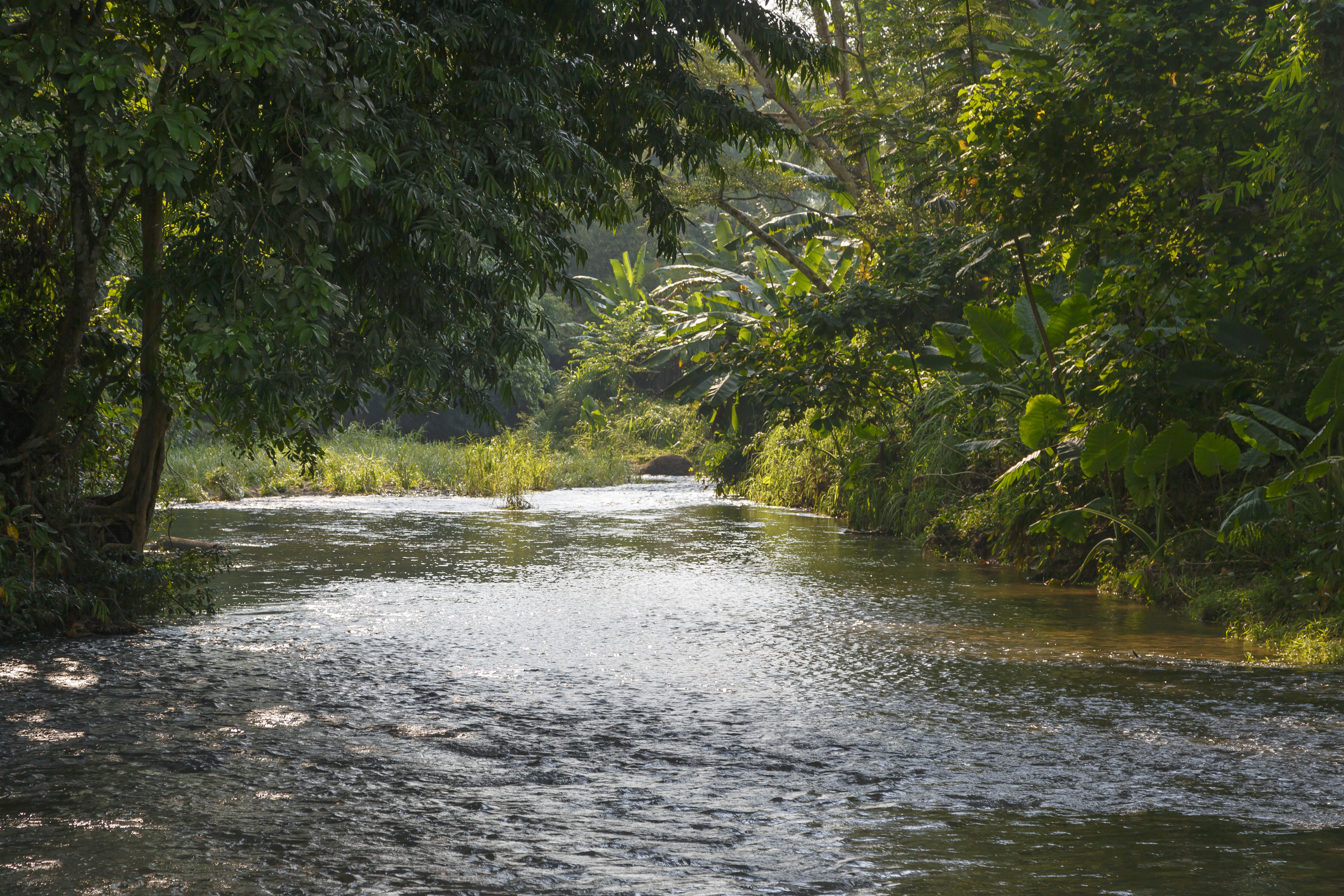
- View of the river.
- Native name: Sungai Pandasan (Malay)

Location
- Country: Malaysia
- State: Sabah
- Division: West Coast Division
- Precise location: Northwestern Borneo

Physical characteristics
- Source
  - location: Stream
- Mouth
  - location: At Kota Belud District into South China Sea
  - coordinates: 6°28′7.28″N 116°32′4.41″E
  - elevation: Sea level

The Pandasan River (Malay: Sungai Pandasan) is a stream located in Kota Belud District, West Coast Division, northwestern Sabah of Malaysia.

== History ==
This stream was where the boats of H.M.S. Iris was attacked by Illanoon pirates in 1846, during the British expedition to North Borneo to suppress piracy.

While the stream is short, it once served as the northwest most extremities of Sulu sultanate influence in Borneo in the 19th century, and therefore appeared in the 1878 agreement, that became point of contention in the North Borneo dispute.

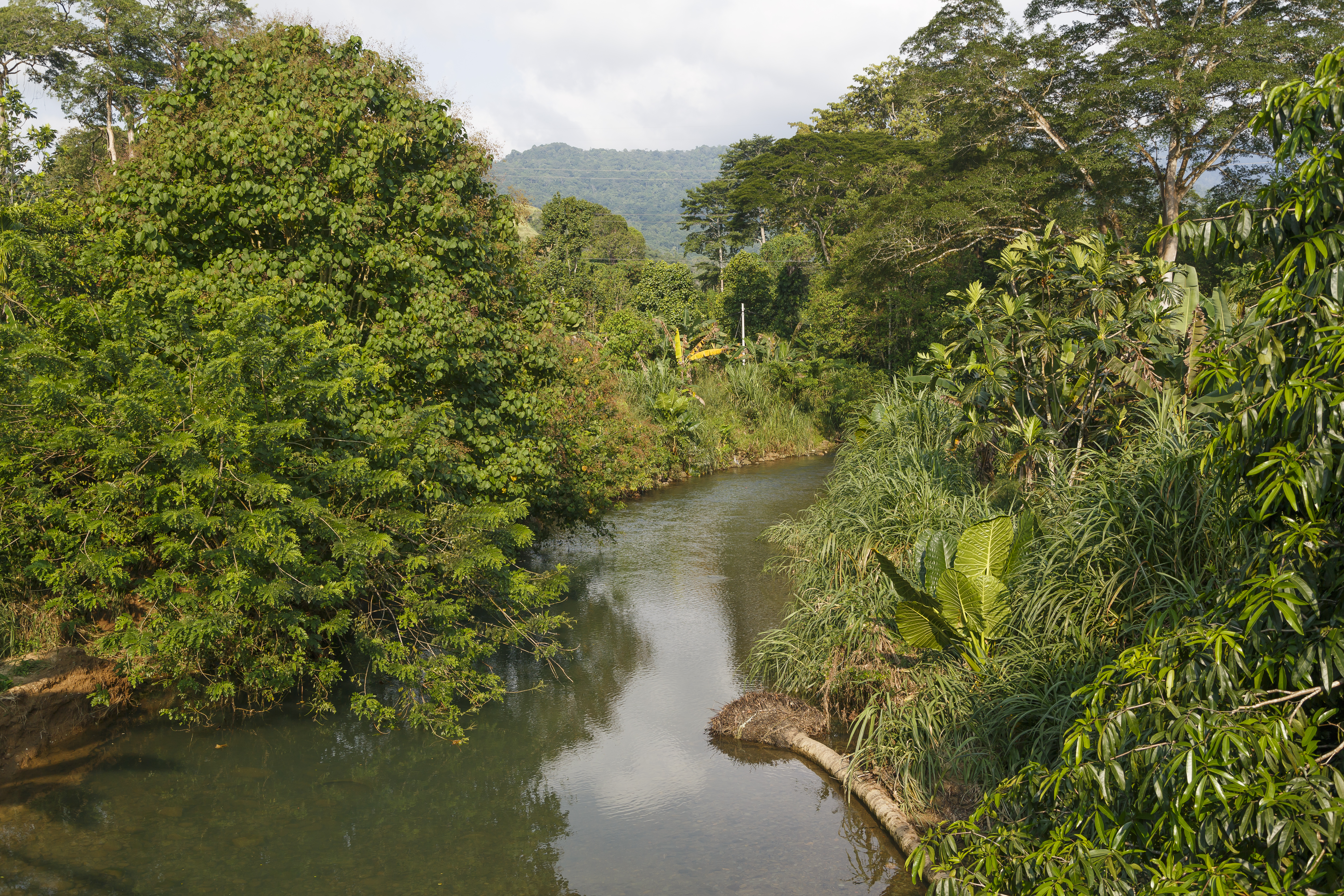
Pandasan river as viewed from the village of Pandasan
