= Maphilindo =

Proposed political union of Malaya, Indonesia and the Philippines

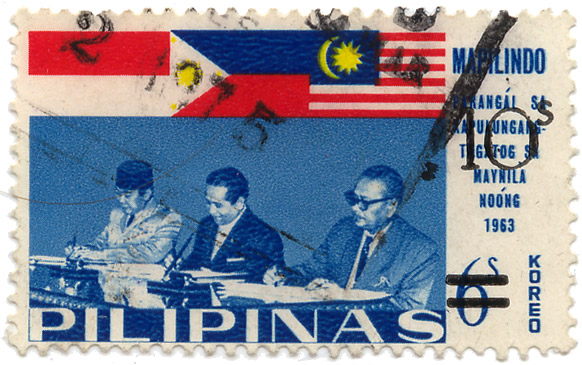
- Stamp commemorating the signing of the Manila Accord
- Formation: July 1963
- Dissolved: Indonesia–Malaysia confrontation
- Type: International defence organisation
- Members: Malaya; Philippines; Indonesia

Maphilindo (for Malaya, the Philippines, and Indonesia) was a proposed loose political association under a confederation of Malaya, Indonesia, and the Philippines.

== Background ==
The original plan for a united state based on the concept of the Malay race was attempted by Wenceslao Vinzons during the Philippines' Commonwealth era. Vinzons had envisioned a united Malay race, which he termed "Malaya Irredenta" (later another name for the union). In his 1959 book Someday, Malaysia, Major Abdul Latif Martelino (later operations officer in the infamous Jabidah massacre) also cited the vision of President Manuel L. Quezon for an integrated, pan-Malayan nation in the region. Quezon envisioned creating a better state which was united. Having a united race at the time would pave way for the development of the Malay. The united state would however, be achieved by the contribution of the people living in the region. Quezon was determined to make his intentions known to the people so that the vision could be easily achieved in the future.

== History ==
Maphilindo was initially proposed as a realization of Filipino national hero Dr. José Rizal's dream of uniting the Malay peoples, seen as artificially divided by colonial frontiers. Uniting the Malay people was highly prioritised resulting in many events occurring within the region. Dr. José Rizal significantly contributed to creating and officiating events designed to unite the people. In July 1963, President Diosdado Macapagal, convened a summit in Manila where the three countries signed the Manila Accord, a series of agreements to resolve controversies over the former British colonies of North Borneo and Sarawak joining Malaysia. The treaties paved way for new developments in the region which would later contribute to the development of the country to what it is now.

While the union was described as a regional association that would approach issues of common concern, it was also perceived as a tactic employed by the Philippines and Indonesia to hinder the formation of the Federation of Malaysia as Malaya's successor state. The Philippines had its own claim over the eastern part of Sabah (formerly British North Borneo), while Indonesia protested the formation of Malaysia as a British imperialist plot. The Indonesians and the Filipinos categorised the signing of the treaty between Britain and the Federation of Malaya as a plot for the former to establish a colony within their borders. The assumption later resulted in heated conflicts between Malaysia, Indonesia, and the Philippines.

The union was dismantled a month later when Sukarno, President of Indonesia, adopted a policy of Konfrontasi (Indonesian, "confrontation") with the newly constituted Malaysia. The Indonesians claimed that the Malayan Government had announced on 29 August that Malaysia would be formed on 16 September 1963, before the result of the referendum of the wishes of the people of Borneo was known. The proclamation of Malaysia was postponed until September 16 to give the UN team time to report. The UN team reported in favor of Malaysia, but the Philippines and Indonesia refused to recognize the new federation. On 16 September, Malaysia severed diplomatic ties with the two countries. Indonesia retaliated by cutting off trade relations with the new nation.

The US, under John F. Kennedy, appeared to have supported Maphilindo as it had hoped that it would reduce the chances of Indonesia turning communist.

Remnants of Maphilindo can be seen in some remaining texts of the current ASEAN Declaration as the drafting process of the declaration had held several language and excerpts from the Manila Declaration, inputted by the Indonesian delegation in Thailand. Both Indonesia's foreign minister, Adam Malik, and Philippine foreign secretary, Narciso Ramos, believe that Maphilindo failed to reflect the regional realities of the time and that a new organization was needed to do so better.

== See also ==
- Bumiputera
- East Indies
- Greater Indonesia
- Malay race
- Malay world
- Malayness
- Native Indonesians
- Nusantara
