= Madrid Protocol of 1885 =

1885 colonial treaty between the UK, Germany and Spain

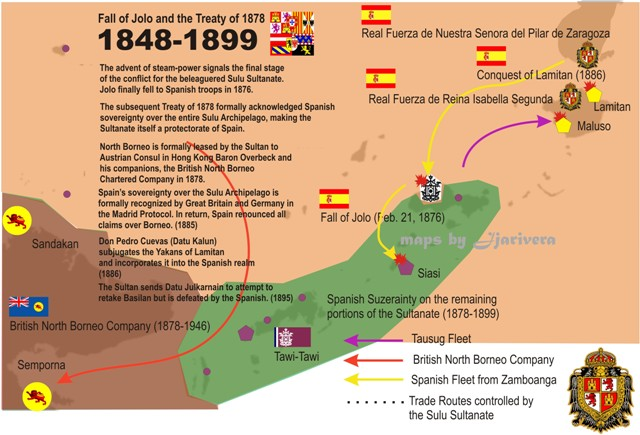
The Madrid Protocol in 1885 making North Borneo under the control of British North Borneo Company while the Sulu Archipelago and the rest of the Philippines islands were under the control of Spanish East Indies.

The Madrid Protocol of 1885 was an agreement between the United Kingdom, Germany, and Spain to recognize the sovereignty of Spain over the Sulu Archipelago as well as the limit of Spanish influence in the region. Under the agreement, Spain relinquished all claim to Borneo.

The Spanish Government renounces, as far as regards the British Government, all claims of sovereignty over the

territories of the continent of Borneo, which belong, or which have belonged in the past to the Sultan of Sulu (Jolo), and which comprise the neighbouring islands of Balambangan, Banguey, and Malawali, as well as all those comprised within

a zone of three maritime leagues from the coast, and which form part of the territories administered by the Company styled the "British North Borneo Company".

— Article III, Madrid Protocol of 1885

Another important point regarding the agreement relates to Article IV, which guarantees no restriction on trade to the parties of the protocol within the Sulu Archipelago and North Borneo.

== See also ==
- Territories claimed by the Philippines
