= Sebuku River =

River in Indonesia and Malaysia

Coordinates: 4.04638°N 117.47482°E

Sebuku River Sungai Sebuku, Sungai Sibuku, Sibuku River, Sibuko River, Sibuckoe River
- River mouth location Sebuku River (Indonesia)

Location
- Country: Malaysia, Indonesia

Physical characteristics
- Source
  - location: Sabah, North Kalimantan
- Mouth
  - elevation: 0 m (0 ft)
- Length: 170 km (110 mi)
- Basin size: 3,574.59 km^{2} (1,380.16 mi^{2})
- Discharge
  - location: Near mouth
  - average: (2008–2019)197.4 m^{3}/s (6,970 cu ft/s)
  - minimum: 39.39 m^{3}/s (1,391 cu ft/s)
  - maximum: 576.01 m^{3}/s (20,342 cu ft/s)

Basin features
- Progression: Sulawesi Sea
- River system: Sebuku River

The Sebuku River is a river in Borneo that flows from Sabah, Malaysia to Nunukan, in the province of North Kalimantan, Indonesia.

== Geography ==
The river flows in the northeastern area of Borneo island with predominantly tropical rainforest climate (designated as Af in the Köppen-Geiger climate classification), and into the Celebes Sea.

The rivermouth is fronted by a small island called Pulau Senelak. A tidal bore occurs 3 days before and after spring tides, and its wave are high and rapid and can cause considerable damage to small craft.

== History ==
The river was once claimed as part of the southernmost border of the influence of Sultanate of Sulu along the Northern-East Coast on what was North Borneo (Sabah) on the island of Borneo in the 19th century. These claims of 'ownership' were disputed by the Brunei Sultanate. Whilst some historians, mainly from the Philippines have claimed the evidence of such ownership was featured in the 1878 grant by Sultan of Sulu to British North Borneo Company, this has been disputed by Sabah and Malaysia historians.

No records of any Sulu towns, cities or centres of ownership ever existed historically or archeologically in the east coast of North Borneo. Any evidence of Sulu Sultanate influence was through piracy, kidnapping and raiding of native North Borneo villages to sell its victims as slaves in the slave markets in the Sulu Sea islands as part of a greater commerce and trade that enriched the Sulu and Moro's.

However, what has been agreed is that the Sulu Sultanate or their agents did collect annual tributes from coastal village chiefs and did trade with coastal and river communities.

The Sulu were not natives of North Borneo and were islanders in the Southern Philippine region.

At the end of the 19th century, this river again became a point of contention between the British North Borneo and Dutch Borneo, since the British regarded this river as its southernmost border with the Dutch, while the Dutch assumes a further northern boundary at Batu Tinagat, Tawau. The boundary dispute was settled in 1899 with a compromise solution of a border between these two extremities.

== See also ==
- List of drainage basins of Indonesia
- List of rivers of Indonesia
- List of rivers of Kalimantan
