= Manila Accord =

1963 treaty between Indonesia, Malaya, and the Philippines

Manila Accord consists of Manila Accord, Manila Declaration and Joint Statement between Federation Malaya, the Republic of the Philippines and the Republic of Indonesia
- Drafted: 7 June 1963; 63 years ago
- Signed: 31 July 1963; 63 years ago
- Location: Manila, Philippines
- Signatories: Sukarno; Tunku Abdul Rahman; Diosdado Macapagal
- Parties: Indonesia; Malaya; Philippines
- Depositary: Philippines Government dated 30 December 1965; The Secretary-General of the United Nations acting in his capacity as depositary the following: (English ) and (French) Registered A-8029 and I-8809
- Language: English

Full text at Wikisource
- Manila Accord (31 July 1963)

The Manila Accord was signed on 31 July 1963 by the Federation of Malaya, the Republic of Indonesia and the Republic of the Philippines, after a meeting from 7 to 11 June 1963 in Manila.

Initiated by President of the Philippines Diosdado Macapagal, the meeting was convened to resolve issues over the wishes of people in North Borneo and Sarawak within the context of United Nations General Assembly Resolution 1541 (XV), Principle 9 of the Annex taking into account the referendum in North Borneo and Sarawak that would be free and without coercion.

== History ==
The Accord lists a series of agreements between the Federation of Malaya, the Republic of Indonesia, and the Republic of the Philippines, and a joint statement by all three parties.

Effective 24 September 1963, the Philippine Embassy in Kuala Lumpur closed down upon the Malayan government's orders, following a failure to reach a satisfactory settlement of the Philippines' claim to eastern North Borneo, and the deferment of recognition of the successor state, Malaysia. Diplomatic and consular relations between the two countries remained suspended until May 1964.

On 7 February 1966, relations between the Philippines and Malaysia became calmer and had stabilised, during which time an exchange of notes constituting an agreement relating to the implementation of the Manila Accord of 31 July 1963 (signed by Philippines and Malaysia at Manila and Kuala Lumpur constituting that both Governments had agreed to abide by the Manila Accord of 31 July 1963) and the accompanying Joint Statement, called for the peaceful settlement of the Philippine claim to North Borneo. The agreements also recognized the need for the parties to come together, as soon as possible, for the purpose of clarifying the claim and discussing the means of settling it to the satisfaction of both parties in consonance with the Manila Accord and the Joint Statement.

In a note verbale also dated 7 February 1966, the government of Malaysia put itself on record "that it has never moved away from the Manila Accord of 31 July 1963 and the Joint Statement accompanying it and reiterates its assurance that it will abide by these agreements, particularly paragraph 12 of the said Manila Accord" (where Malaysia agreed that the inclusion of North Borneo in the Federation of Malaysia would not prejudice either the claim or any right of the Philippines to the territory) and "paragraph 8 of the Joint Statement" (where all parties agreed to seek a just and expeditious solution to the dispute by means of negotiation, conciliation and arbitration, judicial settlement, or other peaceful means of the parties' own choice in conformity with the Charter of the United Nations).

A joint communique dated 3 June 1966 by Malaysia and the Philippines also provides that both parties have agreed to abide by the Manila Accord for the peaceful settlement of the Philippine claim to North Borneo (now called "Sabah"). They also "recognized the need of sitting together, as soon as possible, for the purpose of clarifying the claim and discussing the means of settling it to the satisfaction of both parties" in consonance with said Accord and its accompanying Joint Statement.

The Manila Accord with the Joint Statement, and the Agreement relating to the implementation of the Manila Accord of 31 July 1963 were registered and published after their entry into force had been transmitted to the Secretary-General of the United Nations by the Government of the Republic of the Philippines on 30 December 1965 and 24 October 1967, respectively. Compliance with Article 80 of the Vienna Convention on the Law of Treaties (1969) would lead envisaged jurisdiction of the International Court of Justice for decision unless the parties by common consent could agree to submit the dispute to arbitration.

In 1968, the governments of Malaysia and the Philippines agreed to hold talks in Bangkok for the purpose of clarifying the Philippine claim to North Borneo and discussing the modes of settling it, as provided under the terms of the Manila Accord. As reflected in the official records of a plenary meeting of the United Nations General Assembly, the Malaysian delegation reportedly declared during such talks that "this exercise under the Joint Communique is over and done with" and that they "stalked out of the conference room, thus bringing the talks to an abrupt end," despite publicly announcing a few days earlier that they would discuss with their Philippine counterparts the modes of settlement for the territorial dispute.

== See also ==
- Foreign relations of Indonesia
- Foreign relations of Malaysia
- Foreign relations of the Philippines
- Sovereignty dispute over Sabah
- Succession of states
- Vienna Convention on the Law of Treaties
- Vienna Convention on Succession of States in respect of Treaties
