= Jabidah massacre =

1968 killing of mutinous Philippine Moro soldiers

- Location: Corregidor, Cavite, Philippines
- Date: March 18, 1968
- Target: Moro army recruits
- Deaths: 28 - 200
- Perpetrator: Armed Forces of the Philippines under Ferdinand Marcos' dictatorship

Recreation of the Jabidah unit patch as described by Benigno Aquino Jr. in a privilege speech delivered at the Legislative Building, Manila, on March 28, 1968. Jibin Arula, in a 2009 interview, recalled that his unit patch displayed "skull markings".

The Jabidah massacre on March 18, 1968, was the assassinations or executions of Moro army recruits who allegedly mutinied upon learning the true nature of their mission. It is acknowledged as a major flashpoint that ignited the Moro conflict.

Author Cesar Adib Majul notes that the administration of Ferdinand Marcos had suppressed press coverage of the affair which led to a lack of documentation about the incident and varying accounts of the number of trainees killed, from 11 to 68. This eventually sparked calls for Moro independence and is acknowledged by the Bangsamoro Autonomous Region in Muslim Mindanao (BARMM) as a key moment in Bangsamoro history.

In 2013, Philippine president Benigno Aquino III, recognized that the massacre had taken place and acknowledged that it had "opened deep wounds" with Muslim Filipinos.

== Background ==
=== Philippine claims on Sabah ===
The north-eastern part of Sabah had been under the influence of the Sulu Sultanate since it was allegedly given to them by the Sultanate of Brunei in 1658 for the Sulu Sultanate's help in settling a developing civil conflict in Brunei before being leased or ceded (The agreements were written in Malay using Jawi script. The 1878 agreement used the term padjak meaning "cede or rent", while the 1903 additional cession agreement used the term menyerahkan meaning "surrendered".) to the British in 1878. During the process of decolonization by the British after World War II from 1946, Sabah was integrated as part of the Malaysian Federation in 1963 under the Malaysia Agreement. The Philippine government however protested this, claiming the eastern part of Sabah had never been sold to foreign interests, and that it had only been "leased" by the Sulu Sultanate, and therefore remained the property of the Sultan, and by extension, the property of the Republic of the Philippines. Diplomatic efforts to Malaysia and the United Nations during the administration of President Diosdado Macapagal proved futile.

== Operation Merdeka ==
Operation Merdeka
- Part of North Borneo dispute
Date	1967–1968
Location	Philippines and Sabah, Malaysia
Result	Malaysian defensive victory: Jabidah massacre; Beginning of Moro conflict; Malaysia temporarily suspends diplomatic ties with the Philippines; Sabah failed to become a Province of the Philippines
Territorial changes	Sabah remains under Malaysian control

Belligerents
Philippines	Malaysia • Sabah

Commanders and leaders
(Philippines) Ferdinand Marcos (Philippines) Eduardo Abdul Latif Martelino	(Malaysia) Sultan Ismail Nasiruddin Shah (Malaysia) Tunku Abdul Rahman (Malaysia) Mustapha Harun

In 1962, President Diosdado Macapagal renewed the Philippines' claim over Sabah although the territory has been incorporated into Malaysia. Operation Merdeka is a follow-up to this claim. The plan was for trained commandos to infiltrate Sabah and destabilize the state by sabotage which would then legitimize the Philippines' military intervention in the territory and claiming the state which many Filipinos felt was rightfully theirs.

In 1967, President Ferdinand Marcos secretly authorized Major Eduardo "Abdul Latif" Martelino, a Muslim convert, to take charge of the operations of a secret commando unit code-named "Jabidah" and embark on an operation called "Project Merdeka" (merdeka means "freedom" in Malay) to destabilize and take over Sabah. The alleged masterminds, however, included leading generals in the Armed Forces of the Philippines (AFP), Defense Undersecretary Manuel Syquio, and Marcos himself.

The first phase of the operation saw Martelino, with an advance party of some 17 agents entering Sabah three times to conduct reconnaissance and psychological warfare. It was during the second phase of the operation that the massacre took place. After 180 young Tausugs from Sulu received basic training, they were transported to a remote section of Corregidor Island at the mouth of Manila Bay where they were further trained in guerrilla operations and jungle warfare. Once on the island, the code name was changed to 'Jabidah'. The real purpose of the formation of Jabidah was never publicized therefore leading to wide speculations and controversies regarding this top secret military plan.

== Accounts of the massacre ==
=== Escape of Jibin Arula ===
The Oplan Merdeka and the Jabidah Massacre first came to public attention on March 18, 1968, when two fishermen rescued a Muslim man named Jibin Arula from the waters just off Caballo Island in Manila Bay. They discovered that he had suffered gunshot wounds, and he later recounted that he was the lone survivor of an attempt by members of the armed forces to kill a group of Muslim army recruits.

=== Basic narrative ===
There are various interpretations of the events of that morning. While some interpretations claim that the massacre never took place, the gist of the Jabidah massacre narrative is that for one reason or the other, the trainees refused to continue their training and demanded to be returned home. One batch of recruits were disarmed, with some of the trainees returned home and some others transferred to a regular military camp in Luzon. But another batch of recruits were killed by army troops, with only one survivor, Jibin Arula, managing to escape.

=== Interpretations of the recruits' motives ===
One of the aspects where interpretations of the massacre differ is in the motivation of the recruits for ending their training.

One version states that they mutinied because they were angered by the delay in receiving their allowance, the poor living conditions on Corregidor, and the experience of having to live on miserable rations for three months.

Another version posits that the project, code-named Jabidah involved the recruitment of Muslims trainees who were supposed to be trained to infiltrate and cause chaos in Sabah to strengthen Philippines' territorial claim. These trainees were informed beforehand that they were joining the AFP to fight "communists", but subsequently learned the true nature of their mission during the latter part of their training. Within this camp, some argue that the massacre was due to the mutiny of the Muslim trainees who declined orders to infiltrate Sabah because they felt that the sabotage against Sabah was unjustified and that they also felt kinship with fellow Muslims in Sabah. In this version, the trainees were killed upon learning the truth of their recruitment to ensure that the information was not leaked. Max L. Gross, in his 2007 book, A Muslim archipelago: Islam and politics in Southeast Asia calls this more of a rumor than fact, and one that was created to fan the flames of separatism. Regardless of the lack of contemporary documentation or credible scholarly citation, this is the version broadly believed by those in the community today.

The official narrative denied that the reason for training the recruits were for infiltration in Sabah and that the massacre, as stated in the Manila Bulletin, occurred because the trainees could not endure the hardship, perhaps bordering on cruelty, during the training. With the lack of substantial evidence, the officers involved in the massacre were acquitted, which further angered many in the Muslim community.

== Initial responses ==
Some time after Jibin Arula was found in Cavite, he was brought to Governor Delfin N. Montano and told the governor his story. Eventually, Arula's story resulted in calls for probes in both the Philippine Senate and House of Representatives.

=== Senate exposé ===
Opposition Senator Benigno Aquino Jr. uncovered Jabidah to the public as a plan by Marcos to ensure his grip on power. Fellow opposition members followed suit and criticized the Marcos Administration's role in the incident as indicative of the regime's poor overall administration and neglect of the country's Muslim diaspora. Widespread press coverage of Aquino's denouncements caught the ruling government off-guard.

Nevertheless, Senator Aquino did not consider the incident a massacre. In his privilege speech entitled "Jabidah! Special Forces of Evil?" delivered at the Legislative Building on March 28, 1968, Aquino submitted the following conclusion:

This morning, the Manila Times, in its banner headline, quoted me as saying that I believed there was no mass massacre on Corregidor island.

And I submit it was not a hasty conclusion, but one borne out by careful deductions. What brought me to this conclusion:

1. Massacre means, to my mind, the wanton killing of men—maybe premeditated, but definitely committed according to a previous plan. I submit that there was no plan to kill the Muslim recruits.

2. What would have been the motive for the "massacre"? Some quarters have advanced the theory that the trainees were liquidated in order to silence them. But then, 24 boys have already shown up in Jolo safe and healthy. To release 24 men who can spill the beans and liquidate the remaining 24 "to seal" their lips would defy logic.

3. Jibin Arula has been telling the truth all along. However, his fears, which in his place may be considered valid, may not be supported by the recent turn of events. Twenty-four recruits have turned up.

=== Call for impeachment in the House of Representatives ===
After the Senate revelations implicated President Marcos as ultimately responsible for the massacre, Lanao del Sur Congressman Haroun al-Rashid Lucman called for Congress to begin proceedings to impeach the President. When his proposal did not receive enough congressional support, he decided not to run again for his post in succeeding elections, becoming convinced that Muslims should rule themselves in Muslim Mindanao.

=== International reactions ===
In July 1971, then Prime Minister of Libya, Muammar Gaddhafi, wrote to President Marcos to express his concern. As the Philippines relied on Arab oil, the government tried to defend itself against any accusation and denied any religious repression taking place in Mindanao. The acting foreign Minister added that the problems stemmed from land and political issues which it was ready to solve internally. Then Prime Minister of Malaysia, Tunku Abdul Rahman, also condemned the Philippine government and requested for congressional trial against the officers involved in the massacre. Diplomatic ties between the Philippines and Malaysia were severed as this event also further indicated to Malaysia that the Philippine government still had strong determination in its territorial claim to Sabah. In general, this affair had increased the international community's awareness of the Moro issue in the Philippines.

== Role in igniting the Moro conflict ==
In spite of disputes about the facts of the massacre, historians agree that the Jabidah Massacre was one of the most important flashpoints that ignited the Moro conflict during Marcos' regime.

Despite undergoing numerous trials and hearings, the officers related to the massacre were never convicted which served as a clear indication to the Muslim community that the Christian government had little regard for them. This created a furor within the Muslim community in the Philippines, especially among the educated youth. Muslim students saw the need through this incident to unite in protests and organized demonstrations and rallies in Manila with financial backing from Muslim politicians and university intellectuals. One such demonstration was situated near the Malacañang Palace, where the President and his family resided. The students held a week-long protest vigil over an empty coffin marked 'Jabidah' in front of the palace.

The massacre significantly brought the Muslim intellectuals, who, prior to the incident had no discernible interest in politics, into the political scene to demand for safeguards against politicians who were using them. Apart from the intellectuals, Muslims in Philippines in general saw that all opportunities for integration and accommodation with the Christians were lost and further marginalized.

=== Founding of the Muslim Independence Movement ===
In May 1968, former Cotabato governor Datu Udtog Matalam announced the formation of the Muslim Independence Movement (MIM) which was regarded by observers as the spontaneous backlash of the Jabidah Massacre. The strong feelings and unity of the Muslim intellectuals were seen as the immediate reaction to the establishment of the MIM which carried far-reaching impacts such as the formation of the Moro National Liberation Front (MNLF) and continued armed struggle in the Southern Philippines.

=== Founding of Ansarul Islam ===
Another organization founded in response to the Jabidah Massacre and the account of Jibin Arula was Ansarul Islam (also spelled Ansar El Islam, lit. Helpers of Islam), under the leadership of Domocao Alonto, Salipada Pendatun and Sayyid Capt. Kalingalan Caluang.

=== Founding of the Bangsamoro Liberation Organization ===
When Rashid Lucman's call for the House of Representatives did not get enough congressional support, he became convinced that Muslims should rule themselves in Muslim Mindanao—a conviction which led him to eventually establish the Bangsamoro Liberation Organization (BMLO) after the end of his term in 1969. Bangsamoro Liberation Organization (BMLO) founders were Rashid Lucman, Salipada Pendatun, Domocao Alonto, Hamid Kamlian, Sayyid Sharif Capt. Kalingalan Caluang, Udtog Matalam and Macapantun Abbas Jr.

=== Martial law and the creation of the Moro National Liberation Front ===
On September 23, 1972, Ferdinand Marcos announced that he had placed the entirety of the Philippines, including Muslim Mindanao, under martial law. While Matalam's MIM was already defunct, one of its former members, Nur Misuari, established the Moro National Liberation Front (MNLF) a month after the declaration of martial law, on October 21, 1972. Lucman's BMLO eventually expressed support for the MNLF.

Proclamation 1081 dissolved the various political groups that had been previously established in the Moro provinces, and with the MIM having already been dissolved, Marcos' declaration of martial law effectively assured the MNLF, which was more radical than its predecessors, would come to dominate the Moro separatist movement.

== Conflicting accounts ==
Scholars have opined that the media attention given Arula may have, to some extent, distorted his accounts. The actual events remain unclear as documents were allegedly destroyed by Major Martelino. Arula died in a traffic accident in Trece Martires, Cavite, sometime in August or September 2010.

Some sources differ with the official account, particularly with the exact number of victims:

- Andrew Tian Huat Tan numbers the victims between 28 and 64, and says that author and social anthropologist Arnold Molina Azurin has written that the massacre is a myth.
- William Larousse says that a survivor described recruits being shot in groups of twelve. Note 5 on page 130 gives a number of estimates by other sources ranging from 14 to 64.
- Authors at the Institute of Southeast Asian Studies say that Jibin Arula, described as the sole survivor of the massacre, as numbering his fellow trainees killed at 11, while others numbered them at over 60.
- Alfred W. McCoy puts Arula in a second group of 12 recruits taken to be killed, and describes his escape. Artemio R. Guillermo puts the number of recruits at "about two hundred" and says that only one man escaped being massacred.
- Rigoberto Tiglao, an activist previously incarcerated during the martial law, falsely contends that Jabidah massacre was a ploy by the Liberal Party intended to deliver a fatal blow to President Marcos' re-election bid.

== Official acknowledgement ==
In contrast to his father, Senator Benigno Aquino Jr., President Benigno Aquino III acknowledged the incident as a massacre on March 18, 2013, when he led commemorations on its 45th anniversary. This notably marked the first time that a ruling President had acknowledged the massacre as having taken place. Aquino also directed the National Historical Commission of the Philippines to designate the Mindanao Garden of Peace on Corregidor as a historical landmark. Ground was broken to construct the landmark during a ceremony marking the 45th anniversary of the massacre. During a ceremony marking the 47th anniversary of the massacre, a symbolic peace marker: 'Mindanao Garden of Peace: Corregidor Island' was turned over to the families of the survivors of the massacre.

== In popular culture ==
A 1990 film based on the event sharing the same name starred Anthony Alonzo. However, details were fictionalized for the sake of artistic license.

== See also ==
- Territories claimed by the Philippines
- North Borneo dispute
- Bangsamoro
- Silmido mutiny – similar incident in South Korea
- Lino Bocalan
- List of massacres in the Philippines
