= Heliza Helmi =

- Born: Nur Heliza binti Helmi; 3 February 1986 (age 40); Kuala Terengganu, Terengganu, Malaysia
- Education: UMS, Kota Kinabalu, Sabah
- Occupations: Singer; Model; Host Television; Speaker; Motivational Expert; Humanitarian Activist; Actor
- Years active: 2007–present
- Spouse: Mahadi Badrul Zaman (m. 2022)
- Relatives: Hazwani Helmi (younger sister)
- Musical career
- Genres: Pop, Peace
- Instrument: Vocal

Nur Heliza Helmi (born 3 February 1986) is a contestant in the television talent show Akademi Fantasia Season 5.

== Career ==
Heliza was accepted into Akademi Fantasia season five and was one of sixteen student candidates selected to enter Akademi Fantasia after being selected by the publishing house.

The following are the songs assigned to Heliza while at Akademi Fantasia during the next AF weekly concert:

Concert	Song	Ked.
Week 1	"Kau Pergi Jua" original song by Adam Ahmad	2nd
Week 2	"Aku Bukan Untukmu" original song by Rossa	2nd
Week 3	"Melodi Ahlan" original song by Waheeda	4th
Week 4	"Torn" original song by Natalie Imbruglia	3rd
Week 5	"Diam-Diam Jatuh Cinta" original song by Ramlah Ram	4th
Week 6	"Nafas Cahaya" original song by Misha Omar	6th
Week 7	"Rindu Merindu" original song by Fauziah Idris	6th
Week 8	"Kesal" original song by Ella	4th
Week 9	"Ya Atau Tidak" original song by Erra Fazira	5th
Week 9	"Joget Cinta Sakti" original song by Haziq & Rosma (duet with Aswad)	5th
Week 10	"Cinta Boneka" original song D-Va	4th Place
Week 10	"Cinta Di Lautan Lalang" original song Heliza: Song: Aidit Alfian; Lyrics: Loloq	4th Place

== Personal life ==
Heliza is one of the artists who is active in the humanitarian field of the Islamic community. She also often works with her younger sister, Hazwani Helmi. Her passion for fighting for this ummah issue grew stronger after she went and saw for herself the situation in Gaza, Palestine in 2012. Although at first her family did not allow her to go due to security reasons, she finally got permission, and she was able to share this issue with the community. The lyrics of the song "La Tahzan" were inspired by her experience setting foot there for the first time.

== Discography ==
=== Studio albums ===
- Jom Zikir (2015)

=== AF compilation albums ===
- Best Of Heliza (2007)

=== Singles ===
- Cinta Di Lautan Lalang (2007)
- Doa Dalam Lagu (feat Mawi) (2008)

== Filmography ==
=== Films ===
Year	Title	Character	Notes
2009	Syurga Cinta	Syuhadah	First film
2017	Bukan Cinta Malaikat	Heliza	Malaysian-Indonesian film
2024	Pendekar Awang: Darah Indera Gajah	Siti	

=== Television ===
Year	Title	TV channel	Role	Notes
2007	Akademi Fantasia (season 5)	Astro Ria	Participants	
2011	Man Jadda Wajada	TV Alhijrah	Advocate	
2011	Sinar Itu Hadir Jua	TV1	Advocate	
2012	Rasa Halal Antarabangsa	Astro Oasis	Advocate	
2013	S.I.S	TV9	Advocate	
2017	SIS Istimewa Raya	TV9	Advocate	special for Eid
2018	Gema Gegar Vaganza (season 2)	Astro Oasis	Participants	
2019	Maharaja Lawak Mega 2019	Astro Warna	Guest artist	
2021	Warung Wak (Season 3)	Awesome TV	Guest artist	
2022	Wanita Hari Ini	TV3	Guest artist	
2022	Borak Kopitiam	TV3	Guest artist	
2022	Megalawak	Astro Warna	Guest artist	
2022	MeleTOP	Astro Ria	Guest Host	
2024	Nasi Lemak Kopi O	TV9	Host	

=== Drama ===
Year	Title	Character	TV Channel	Notes
2009	Doa Ibu			First drama
2012	Warkah Cinta	Wardah Abdul Latif	TV Alhijrah	
2024	Lelaki Melayu Terakhir	Aisyah	TV3	
2025	Iqbal	Tiara	TV Okey	

=== Telefilm ===
Year	Title	Character	TV Channel	Notes
2012	Cinta Kun Fayakun	Fairuzah Hanum	TV Alhijrah	First telefilm

=== Theater ===
Year	Title	Character	Production	Notes
2015	Cinta High Class	Qaniah Syumaila	Studio Dramatist	13th Islamic Book Expo

== Awards and nominations ==
Year	Award	Category	Results
2007	21st Berita Harian Popular Star Award	Popular Female New Artist	Nominated
2008	23rd Juara Lagu Award	Finalist in the Creative Ethnic category "(Doa Dalam Lagu with Mawi)"	Nominated
2009	22nd Malaysian Film Festival	Female Hopeful Actress "(Syurga Cinta)"	Nominated
2009	22nd Malaysian Film Festival	Best Actress "(Syurga Cinta)"	Nominated
2011	Entertainment Media Readers' Choice Award	Beautiful Skin Award for Women	Nominated
2012	Daily News Popular Star Award	Female Artist of Stylo	Nominated
2012	Daily News Popular Star Award	Influential Artist on Social Media Sites	Nominated
2014	Daily News Popular Star Award	Most Popular TV Host	Nominated
