= Tenas Effendy =

Indonesian grammarian and historian

- Born: November 9, 1936; Kuala Panduk, Pelalawan, Dutch Indies
- Died: February 28, 2015 (aged 78); Pekanbaru, Riau, Indonesia
- Occupations: Grammarian; Historian
- Known for: Modern historian of Riau region; Founder of Tenas Effendy Foundation in 1979

Teuku Nasaruddin Said Effendy, also known as Tenas Effendy, was an Indonesian grammarian and historian. He held several symposia in Malaysia, Brunei and Singapore. His work is translated into Thai. Effendy founded the Tenas Effendy Foundation in 1979 for the preservation of Malay classical literature.

== Early life ==
Tenas Effendy is the younger son of Teuku Sayed Umar Muhammad, a cadet branch of the Pelalawan royal family. His father worked as a grammarian for the Pelalawan Kingdom. The Kingdom was located in Central Sumatra, which was at the time a swapraja under Dutch colonial rule. From an early age, he studied Malay prose such as gurindam and pantun to be his father's successor.

== Career ==
=== 1950s–1980s ===
Effendi published his first book, Ungkapan Tradisional Melayu Riau, in 1952, when he was a student in Bengkalis highschool, Riau. He wrote several historical books in the 1970s, such as Banjir darah di mempusun (1970), Raja Indra Pahlawan (1970), Songket Siak (1971), Hulubalang Canang (1972) and Kubu Terakhir (1973). Around this time, he established Tenas Effendy Foundation for the preservation of Classical Malay literature.

=== 1990–2010s ===
Books in this era include: Pedigree of Malay kings in Johor, Riau Lingga and Pahang sultanates (1990) and Johorian sphere of influence in Pelalawan (1995). He also wrote about the Aslian-Sakai people live in the Sumatra jungle in his 2002 book The Orang Petalangan of Riau and their Forest Environment. Effendi become the head of Traditional Ruler Council of Riau Malay in 2000 until 2005.

Effendi was posthumously awarded with Bintang Mahaputra Nararya for his contribution by Indonesia in 2019.
