= Hazwani Helmi =

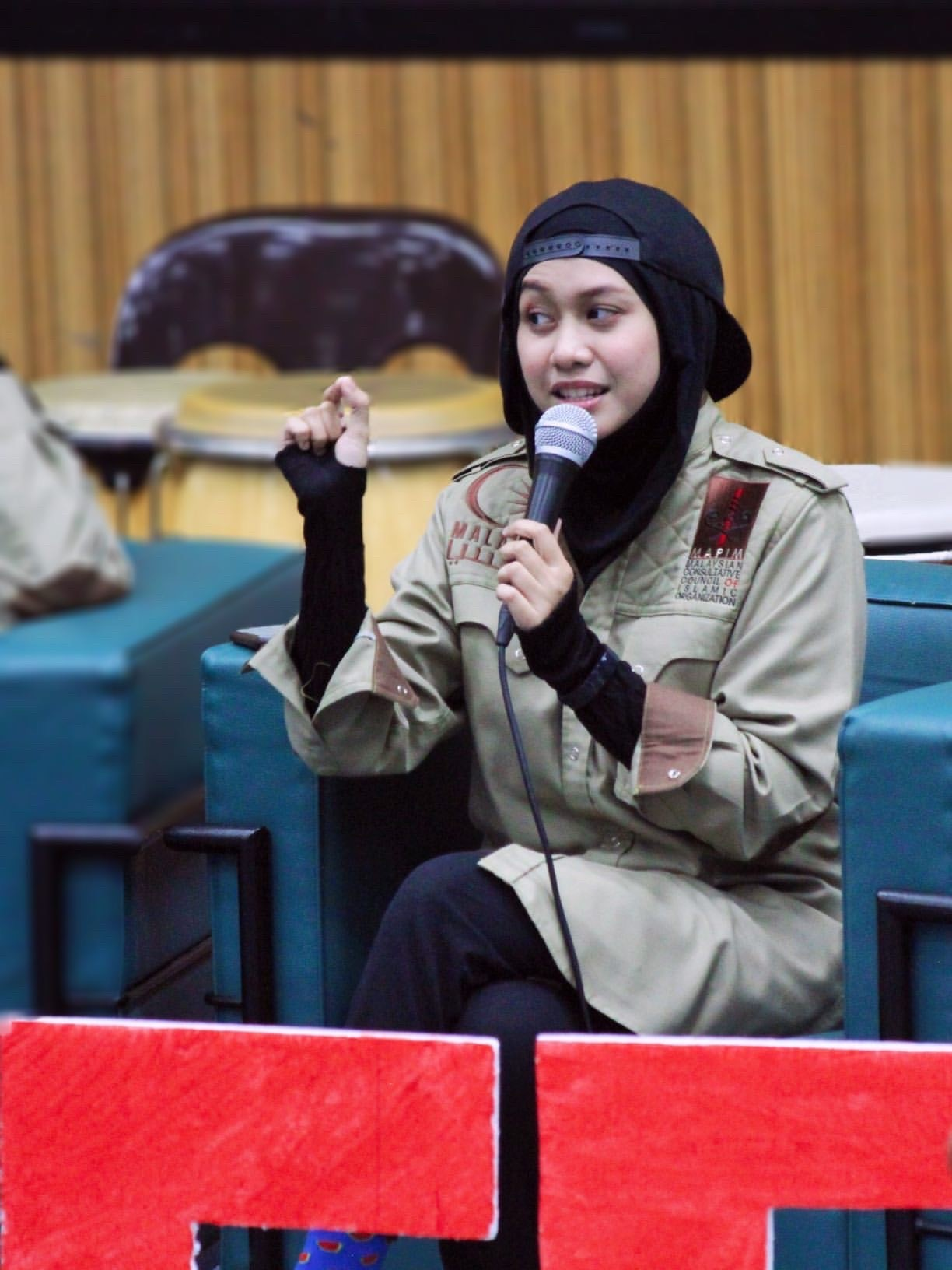
- Born: Nur Hazwani Afiqah binti Helmi; 29 January 1997 (age 29); Kuala Terengganu, Terengganu, Malaysia
- Education: Bachelor of Islamic Revealed Knowledge and Human Sciences in Psychology
- Alma mater: International Islamic University Malaysia
- Occupations: Singer-Songwriter, Speaker, Humanitarian Activist, Model, TV Presenter, Actress
- Years active: 2015–present
- Relatives: Heliza Helmi (Sister)
- Musical career
- Genres: Nasyeed Pop, R&B, Arab Pop
- Instruments: Vocal, Guitar, Beatbox

Nur Hazwani Afiqah binti Helmi (born 29 January 1997), known professionally as Hazwani Helmi, is a Malaysian singer-songwriter, television personality, humanitarian activist, model and actress. She began writing songs at the age of 13 after taking guitar lessons for a week. Her first song, “Jom Zikir”, which she wrote independently, was published on her older sister Heliza Helmi’s album #JOM (2013). She subsequently pursued a career in the entertainment industry and participated in various humanitarian missions. In 2025, she participated in the Global Sumud Flotilla, an international humanitarian mission to Gaza, alongside Heliza Helmi. She was among the Malaysian participants detained by Israeli authorities following the interception of the flotilla.

== Early life ==
Hazwani was born at Hospital Besar Kuala Terengganu during the last ten nights of Ramadan. She is the youngest out of four siblings, with two sisters and a brother. She was raised in Tawau, Sabah, for 11 years, from the age of 3 to 14.

From 2002 to 2003, she received her early education at Tawau Pre-Islamic School. She then pursued her primary education at SK Holy Trinity and Tawau Primary Islamic School from 2004 to 2009. She completed her secondary education at SMK Tawau before moving to Kuala Lumpur two years later.

She subsequently completed her secondary education at SMK Perimbun, where she majored in the Accounting stream. At the end of the 2015–2016 academic year, she resumed her studies at the Centre for Foundation Studies at the International Islamic University Malaysia (IIUM). She went on to pursue a bachelor’s degree in Psychology at IIUM and graduated in 2021, with her graduation ceremony held in August 2022.

Hazwani’s older sister, Heliza Helmi, encouraged her to push beyond her boundaries, a mindset that aligned with Hazwani’s life philosophy: “Nothing is impossible because Allah can make the impossible possible for you.”

At the age of 16, Hazwani began working as a personal assistant and giving motivational talks. After completing her Sijil Pelajaran Malaysia (SPM) examination in 2014, her focus gradually shifted towards humanitarian work, and she began participating in various humanitarian missions.

Hazwani even took a semester off from university to participate in humanitarian efforts, as she believes that learning can take place beyond the classroom. To her, humanitarian missions provide opportunities for learning, personal growth, and meaningful transformation.

== Career ==
=== 2011–2020 ===
Year	Activity
2011	Hazwani began her music career by composing songs for her sister, Heliza Helmi which was released in 2013
2012	She appeared to be a guest in Prof Muhaya's own television shows which was known as Reset Minda in Astro Oasis.
2013	She began giving motivational talks for students in schools and universities at the age of 16.
2014	She began actively involved with humanitarian works after finishing her SPM exam.
2015	She released her debut song titled "Jom Selawat" which was sung together with her sister.
2016	At the age of 19, Hazwani had already established herself as a co-writer and released a book entitled "Wake Up." The book discusses motivations and offers suggestions for preventing people from becoming engulfed with their own dark pasts. In the same year, she was named as "Ikon Muslim Volunteer Malaysia," making her one of the group's youngest icons. Other prominent icons in the group include Prof Muhaya and Dato’ Dr Fadzilah Kamsah.
2017	Hazwani took her one semester study leave to focus on the humanitarian journey and to kickstart her hosting career. She got the opportunity to host a well known kid's television program, "Qari Jr" produced by Media Prima. Other than that, she was invited as a guest host for Malaysian breakfast morning show, "Nasi Lemak Kopi O TV9”. In the meantime, she was involved diligently in humanitarian missions while still pursuing her studies in her university. She has actively travelled abroad to provide relief in countries such as Yemen, Syria, Palestine, Indonesia, Cambodia and Africa. In the same year, Hazwani and her sister were nominated in Anugerah Nasyid Ikim Fm 2017, TV Alhijrah, for their song “Jom Selawat".
2018	Hazwani and Heliza (The Helmis) has joined an Islamic reality program show, known as Gema Gegar Vaganza (GGV). They were later involved in a new project Fauzaan after completed their participation in GGV 2. The purpose of this project is to guide people whose in a hectic lifestyle to be able to memorise the Quran. She has recorded several surahs and translations comprising surah Ad-Dukhan and Surah As-Sajdah. Throughout the time of Ramadan, she was actively involved in a prestigious Islamic event known as "Himpunan Artis Sayang Al-Quran".
2020	Hazwani began to explore producing her own music. She was given the freedom to handle herself in the process of writing and producing music. Starting with the composition of the melody, lyrics, ideas for arrangements, and the song's concept, to assembling the teams and determining the project's budget. Near the end of 2020, Hazwani has produced her first r&b pop genre song entitled "Bila Aku Sudah Tiada" sung by The Helmis.

=== Modelling and voiceover career ===
Other than being active in the entertainment and humanity industry, Hazwani has expanded her career into the modelling field. She became a model for the official campaign for HelizaGuzelHive. The campaign was filmed in New Zealand (2016). Apart from that, she was also invited to became a model for Scarftan, Rayyan Hayya for Ramadan campaign (2019) and Cacas (2021). Over and above, she has done a voiceover for a Malaysian commercial product, Susu Ilham (2019).

=== Ayat Cinta Dari Tuhan ===
"Ayat Cinta dari Tuhan" was produced in 2019 and was one of Hazwani's music projects. For the single, she served as lyricist, composer, music arranger, and director. The song was composed based on a real-life story inspired by an anonymous individual.

== Discography ==
=== Single ===
- "Jom Selawat" (2015)
- "Jom Doa" (2015)
- "Ayat Cinta Dari Tuhan" (2019)
- "Allahumarhamna bil Quran" (2019)
- "Humble Prayer" (2020)
- "Bila Aku Sudah Tiada" (2021)
- "Rawat" (2022)
- "Wahana" (2023)
- "You Are Not Alone" (2024)
- ”Mengukir Takdir” (2025)

=== Album ===
- Jom (2015)

== Filmography ==
=== Series ===
Year	Title	Role	Channel	Notes
2021	The Khadijahs	Hazwani	Nurflix	
2021	Kafe Duke	Iqa	TV3	
2022	Janji Pada Hati	Laila	TV Alhijrah	
2024	Lelaki Melayu Terakhir	Fatimah	TV3	
2025	IQBAL	Aliya	TV Okey	Heroin
2026	Ferry Puasa Ke?	Zara	TV Okey	Heroin

=== Telemovie ===
Year	Title	Role	Channel	Notes
2023	HILANG (Penyu)	Farah	Tonton	Heroin

=== Movie ===
Year	Title	Role	Notes
2024	Pendekar Awang: Darah Indera Gajah	Minah	First film debut
2027	Langit 2 Warna	Izzara	Coming soon

=== Television ===
Year	Programme	Channel	Notes
2016	Tanyalah Ustaz	TV3	Guest Host
2017	Qari Jr	TV3	Host
2018	Tazkirah Malam Jumaat	Astro Oasis	Segment Skits
2018	Gema Gegar Vaganza (season 2)	Astro Oasis	Contestant
2020	Sahabat Ramadan	Astro Oasis	Host and Story Teller
2021	Tanya Ustazah	Astro Oasis	Host
2023	Wahana Kasih	Astro Oasis	Host
2024	Assalamualaikum	TV Alhijrah	Host

== Humanitarian works ==
=== Rescue Syria Humanitarian Aid Projects ===
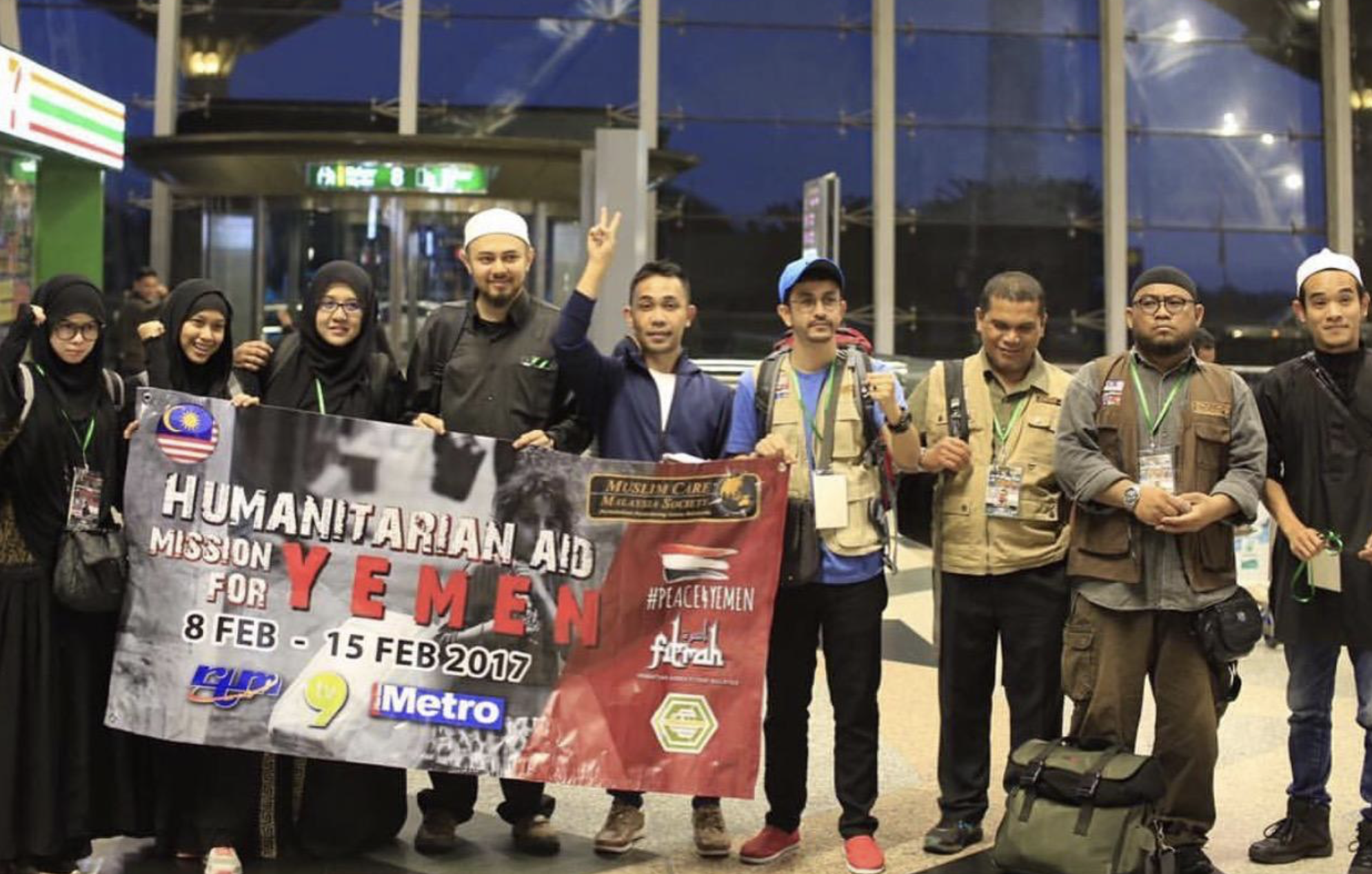
Humanitarian mission for Yemen in 2017

She was entrusted by Malaysian Consultative Council for Islamic Organization (MAPIM) to establish and take part in these humanitarian projects in Syria. MAPIM has focused several sectors in desperate need of emergency assistance. As of March 2017, the MAPIM Syrian Rescue Team has successfully distributed RM6,500,000 worth of donations from Malaysians to Syrians. This assistance is channeled directly through a series of humanitarian missions led by Dr Sani Araby Al-Kahery. The challenges facing the RescueSyria team are widely shared in local media writing as well as at local and overseas television station invitation slots. Among the successes of RescueSyria Assistance Mission (MAPIM) are:

- Built 24 water wells in 4 Syrian states and served over 250,000 residents.
- Delivered 15 Syrian emergency aid content
- Distributes 130,000 packs of bread to 100,000 Syrian families
- Send 7,000 winter blankets for refugees inside Syria
- Send 7,000 winter heaters to refugees in Syria
- ReActivate 23 schools in 4 states in Syria. The schools currently operate with a total student population of 15,000.
- Send 7 ambulances for use to 6 medical points and hospitals in Azaaz, Idleb, Aleppo, Hama -Syria.
- Establishes a maternity clinic called Malaysia Maternity & Paediatric Clinic For Syria to serve 2 states in Hama & Idleb .
- Sponsors 6 hospitals in desperate need of medicines and medical equipment.
- Rescue Syria team had successfully delivered 15 containers containing up to MYR 2 Million of crucial basic necessities for Syrian refugees in Syria.

=== Wake Up For Gaza Humanitarian Mission ===
- Hazwani took part in giving awareness about the solidarity of Gazan People.
- Involved in all Ministry meetings in Gaza

=== Emergency Aid For Palu ===
- Distributed 2000 grade A, food pack and 1000 hygiene utilities
- Delivered 2500 prayer pack which consists of prayer mat, prayer clothing, Quran and tasbih
- Built 10 water wells and water generator in a specific area in Palu, Indonesia.

== International Conference ==
Participant, "Third Conference of the League of “Parliamentarians For Al-Quds” 8 February 2020, officiated by Yang Amat Berhormat Tun Dr. Mahathir Mohamed, the Prime Minister of Malaysia

== Honors ==
- Malaysia :
  - Lieutenant of Civil Defence Emergency Response Team (CDERT)(2022)
