= Nor Aini Shariff =

Malaysian fashion designer

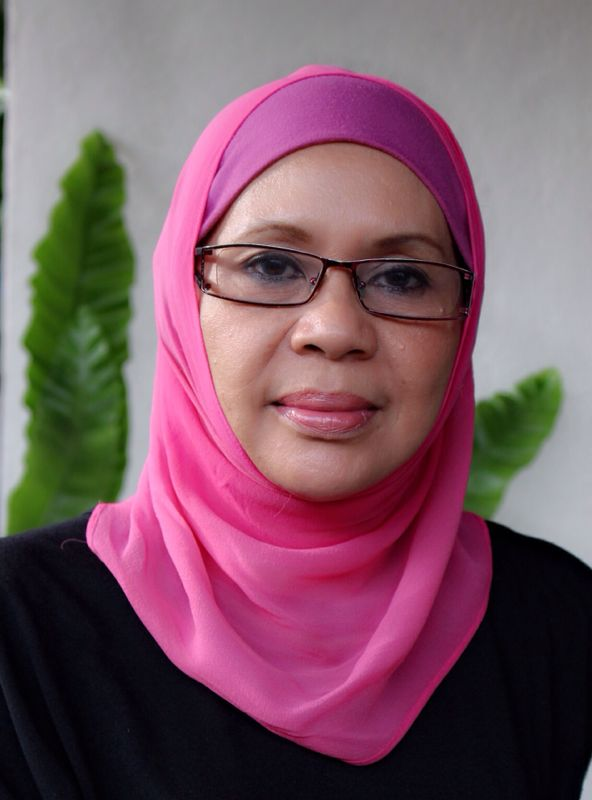
- Nor Aini Shariff
- Born: Melaka, Malaysia
- Occupation: Fashion designer / Founder of JARUMAS
- Label: JARUMAS
- Website: www.jarumas.com

Nor Aini Shariff is a Malaysian fashion designer and founder of the JARUMAS label.

== Other links ==
- CRAFT TRENDS IN ASEAN + 2016
- http://ww1.utusan.com.my/utusan/info.asp?y=2006&dt=0508&pub=Utusan_Malaysia&sec=Keluarg{{a&pg=ke_01.htm
