= Territorial disputes of the Philippines =

The Philippines has claims on territories which include the Spratly Islands, portions of North Borneo, and the Scarborough Shoal.

== Current disputes ==
=== South China Sea islands ===
Map showing the approximate area corresponding to the official extent of the West Philippine Sea in the South China Sea. The area contains the Spratly Islands and the Scarborough Shoal which are territories claimed by the Philippines.

The Philippine government claims Spratly Islands features locating within its EEZ in the South China Sea as part of its territory. The Philippine government' has designated its EEZ in the eastern portion of the South China Sea as the "West Philippine Sea".

==== Scarborough Shoal ====
The Scarborough Shoal, more correctly described as a group of islands, atolls, and reefs rather than a shoal, is located in the South China Sea. The nearest landmass is Palauig town, Zambales province, Luzon Island, at 221 kilometres (137 mi). It is about 198 kilometres (123 mi) west of Subic Bay.

The Philippines, the People's Republic of China and Taiwan claim it.

In April 2012, the Philippines accused Chinese boats of fishing illegally and asked them to leave.

The Philippines is asserting jurisdiction over the shoal based on the juridical criteria established by public international law on the lawful methods for the acquisition of sovereignty. Among the criteria (effective occupation, cession, prescription, conquest, and accretion), the Philippines said that the country "exercised both effective occupation and effective jurisdiction over Bajo de Masinloc since its independence". Thus, it claims to have erected flags on some islands and a lighthouse which is reported to the International Maritime Organization. It also asserts that Philippine and US Naval Forces have used it as an impact range and that its Department of Environment and Natural Resources has conducted scientific, topographic and marine studies on the shoal, while Filipino fishermen regularly use it as a fishing ground and have always considered it their own. Likewise, multiple engagements and arrests of Chinese fishermen were already made at the shoal by the Philippine Navy for using illegal fishing methods and catching of endangered sea species.

The legal basis of the Philippines' assertion is based on the international law on acquisition of sovereignty. Thus, the Philippine government explains that its Exclusive Economic Zone (EEZ) claim on the waters around Scarborough Shoal is different from the sovereignty exercised by the Philippines on the shoal itself.

The Chinese basis for the claim is that the shoal, according to China, was first discovered by Chinese in the 13th century and historically used by Chinese fishermen.

==== Spratly Islands ====
The Philippines claims fifty-two landforms in the Spratly Island group. Of these fifty-two landforms, only five islands, two cays, and three reefs are under Philippine occupation: the Flat Island (Patag), the Loaita Island (Kota), the Nanshan Island (Lawak), the Thitu Island (Pagasa), the West York Island (Likas), the Lankiam Cay (Panata), the Northeast Cay (Parola), the Irving Reef (Balagtas), the Commodore Reef (Rizal), and the Second Thomas (Ayungin) Reef. Some of the other landforms claimed but not occupied by the Philippines as of now are either occupied by Vietnam, China, Taiwan or Malaysia. Landforms in the Spratly Islands group that have not been claimed by the Philippines are typically those that are closer to Vietnam. The farthest landform the Philippines claims is Ladd Reef, which is currently occupied by Vietnam.

The Philippines established a municipality in the province of Palawan named Kalayaan after all the landforms found on Pag-asa island,

=== North Borneo ===
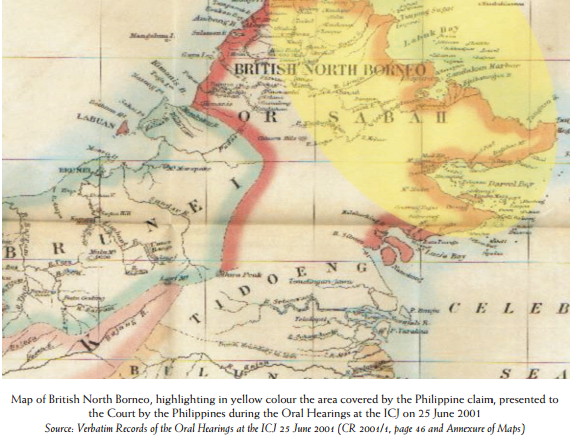
Map of the British North Borneo with the yellow area covered the Philippine claim to eastern Sabah, presented by the Philippine Government to ICJ on 25 June 2001

Between 1658 and 1700, the Sultanate of Sulu acquired the eastern part of the territory of Northern Borneo after helping the Bruneian forces settle a civil war. The Sulu Archipelago then came under the control of the Spanish while the area of Northern Borneo was administered by the British after the sultans of Brunei and Sulu agreed to cede their control. The western and eastern parts of Northern Borneo became known as North Borneo.

In its process of decolonization beginning in 1946, Great Britain included Sabah in the newly formed Federation of Malaysia. The Philippines, which had already achieved its independence from the United States, protested the formation of Malaysia and filed claims for the whole territory of Northern Borneo under the administration of President Diosdado Macapagal. However, during a meeting to plan Maphilindo, the Philippine government stated that it had no objection to the formation of Malaysia, but claimed that the Sultan of Sulu wanted payment from the British government. The first Malaysian Prime Minister, Tunku Abdul Rahman, said he would return to Kuala Lumpur to protest the Philippines' claim.

Philippine President Ferdinand Marcos later revived the claim and trained a number of Moro fighters to reclaim the territory in a secret mission named Operation Merdeka. However, when the recruits gained knowledge of their true mission, most of them demanded to be returned home, as they did not want to kill their fellow Muslims in Sabah. Their request was denied; Marcos did not send back his soldiers. Instead, most of the fighters were executed in an event known as the Jabidah massacre. This caused a southern Philippines insurgency to emerge, and the claim continued to be escalated by other claimants from the defunct Sultanate of Sulu. These claimants each attempted to give themselves legitimacy by self-proclaiming as the new Sultan of Sulu with support from politicians in the Philippine central government wishing to incorporate Sabah into the Philippines. Most new claimants and Philippine politicians today use the promised Malaysian lease payment as their main reason to take over the territory and also use it as a reason before the International Court of Justice (ICJ).

=== Other maritime disputes ===
As of 2025, the Philippines and Palau had a continuing dialogue to resolve an exclusive economic zone overlap.

== See also ==
- Free Territory of Freedomland
- Island of Palmas Case
- List of internal boundary disputes in the Philippines
