= MMOV =

MMOV may reference to:

== Acronyms ==
Multi-mission Offshore Vessel, a class of Philippine-manufactured ships listed among the floating assets of the Philippines' Bureau of Fisheries and Aquatic Resources, primarily intended to guard Philippine waters against illegal fishing.

== Ships ==
- DA BFAR MMOV 5001 - One of the two recently launched lead ships in the Philippines' Bureau of Fisheries and Aquatic Resources' MMOV class.
- DA BFAR MMOV 5002 - One of the two recently launched lead ships in the Philippines' Bureau of Fisheries and Aquatic Resources' MMOV class.
