= BRP Datu Cabaylo =

Offshore civilian patrol vessel

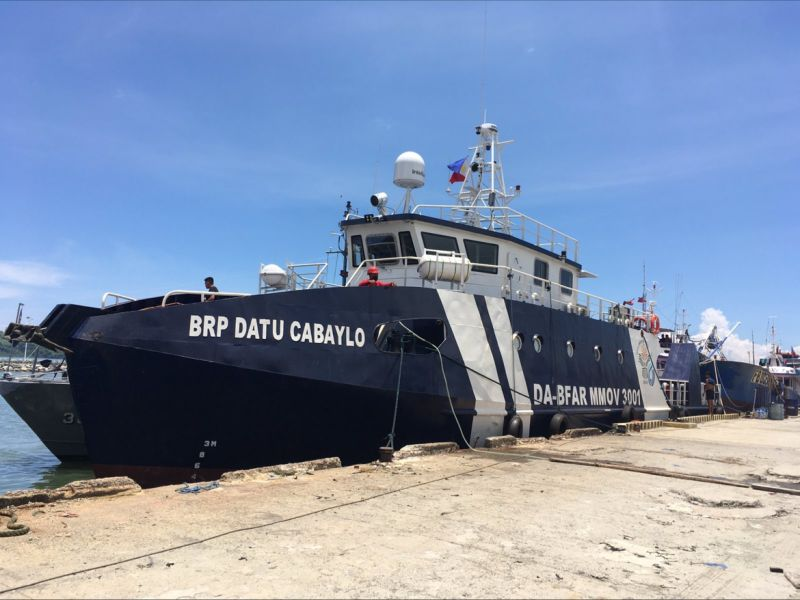

History

Philippines
- Name: BRP Datu Cabaylo
- Namesake: Datu Cabaylo, last datu of the Kingdom of Taytay
- Operator: Bureau of Fisheries and Aquatic Resources
- Ordered: 2020
- Builder: Josefa Slipways Inc., Sual, Pangasinan, Philippines
- Launched: 14 June 2022
- Identification: Hull number: MMOV-3001
- Status: In operation (as of Oct. 2024)

General characteristics
- Class & type: Datu Cabaylo-class multi-mission offshore vessel
- Length: 30.0 m (98 ft)
- Propulsion: *2 × 4,300 kW (5,800 shp) MTU diesel engines; 1 × 75 kW (101 shp) bow thruster
- Speed: 14+ knots
- Endurance: 10 days, 2,500 nautical miles (4,600 km; 2,900 mi); Designed to be on patrol 2,500 hours per year
- Complement: 2 officers, 10 crew
- Sensors & processing systems: L-3 C4ISR suite; AN/SPS-78 surface search and navigation radar

BRP Datu Cabaylo (MMOV-3001) (also known as DA-BFAR MMOV-3001) is the lead ship of a new class of 30-meter multi-mission offshore civilian patrol vessels operated by the Philippine government's Bureau of Fisheries and Aquatic Resources. The ship was built by Josefa Slipways, Inc. in Sual, Pangasinan using a design from Australian ship designer Incat Crowther, and was launched on 14 June 2022. It was commissioned in the later part of 2022. Its intended mission is to guard Philippine waters against illegal fishing, maritime protection and fisheries control, with secondary mission of supporting law enforcement agencies like the Philippine Coast Guard in patrolling Philippine territorial waters and Exclusive Economic Zones.

== Conflict ==
On October 8, 2024, the People's Liberation Army Navy warship and China Coast Guard cutter 3301 along Scarborough Shoal fired water cannons at BRP Datu Cabaylo and BRP Datu Sanday (MMOV-3002), both deployed to resupply Filipino fishermen with fuel, food and medicine. On October 11, a Chinese militia vessel with bow number 00108 along Pag-asa (Sandy) Cay 4 deliberately sideswiped and collided with Datu Cabaylo at its starboard bow.
