= BRP Francisco Dagohoy =

BRP Francisco Dagohoy is the name of the following ships of the Philippines, named for Francisco Dagohoy:

- BRP Francisco Dagohoy (PF-10), a Andrés Bonifacio-class frigate, in commission 1979–1985
- BRP Francisco Dagohoy (MMOV-5002), a patrol vessel serving the Bureau of Fisheries and Aquatic Resources
