= PMI Colleges Bohol =

Private college in Bohol, Philippines

- Dalubhasaan ng PMI Bohol (Filipino)
- Motto: Fortuna Favet Fortibus
- Motto in English: "Stand Proud, You're Part of the Legacy!"
- Type: Private, Non-sectarian Maritime Institution
- Established: 1948
- Founder: Atty. Tomas Cloma
- Affiliations: Philippine Navy, Philippine Merchant Marine Academy, Philippine Coast Guard, MARINA, UKAS (Management Systems), Global Group, Resque 177
- President: Rizabel Cloma-Santos
- Director: Misoro A. Salamera
- Location: 27 Carlos P. Garcia Avenue, Tagbilaran City, Bohol, Philippines; 9°38′38.526″N 123°51′18.1758″E
- Campus: Urban Main campus: Carlos P. Garcia Avenue, Tagbilaran City Extension campus: Tomas Cloma Avenue, Barangay Taloto, Tagbilaran City.
- Alma Mater song: The Admiral's Hymn
- Colors: Orange and Blue
- Nickname: The Admirals
- Website: www.pmicolleges.com
- Location in the Visayas Location in the Philippines

The PMI Colleges Bohol is a private, non-sectarian, co-educational institution of higher learning in Tagbilaran City, Bohol, Philippines and is part of the PMI Colleges system. It offers marine courses such as Marine Transportation, Marine Engineering and Customs Administration. With its main building at Carlos P. Garcia Avenue, it has an extension campus at Tomas Cloma Avenue, Barangay Taloto, Tagbilaran City.

== History ==
The first PMI Colleges (formerly known as Philippine Maritime Institute) campus was established on September 18, 1948 in Santa Cruz, Manila by Atty. Tomas Cloma (an Admiral and founder of the Kalayaan Group of Islands). In addition to his lasting and well-established academic legacy in PMI Colleges, Admiral Cloma also established several academic ventures in his home province of Bohol. He contributed in the establishment of the Loboc Academy and the Mount Carmel’s School, which he donated to the Balilihan Parish. He opened the College for Far East in Tagbilaran City before finally putting up PMI Colleges-Bohol, the third campus in the Philippines of PMI Colleges after Manila and Quezon City.

== See also ==
- PMI Colleges
- Atty. Tomas Cloma
