= BRP Datu Sanday =

History

Philippines
Name	BRP Datu Sanday
Namesake	Datu Sanday, a datu from Marawi City
Operator	Bureau of Fisheries and Aquatic Resources
Ordered	2020
Builder	Josefa Slipways Inc., Sual, Pangasinan, Philippines
Completed	2022
Identification	Hull number: MMOV-3002
Status	In active service

General characteristics
Class and type	Datu Cabaylo-class multi-mission offshore vessel
Length	30.0 m (98 ft)
Propulsion	*2 × 4,300 kW (5,800 shp) MTU diesel engines; 1 × 75 kW (101 shp) bow thruster
Speed	14+ knots
Endurance	10 days, 2,500 nautical miles (4,600 km; 2,900 mi); Designed to be on patrol 2,500 hours per year
Complement	2 officers, 10 crew
Sensors and processing systems	L-3 C4ISR suite; AN/SPS-78 surface search and navigation radar

BRP Datu Sanday (MMOV-3002) (also known as DA-BFAR MMOV-3002) is the second ship of the Datu Cabaylo-class of 30-meter multi-mission offshore civilian patrol vessels being built for the Philippine government's Bureau of Fisheries and Aquatic Resources. The ship is being built by Josefa Slipways, Inc. in Sual, Pangasinan and it was launched in the 3rd quarter of 2022. Its intended mission is to guard Philippine waters against illegal fishing.

== Conflict ==
On Saturday (9/12/2023), a Chinese coast guard ship fired a high-pressure water cannon at a Philippine Bureau of Fisheries and Aquatic Resources ship off the coast of Scarborough Shoal in the South China Sea

As is known, on Saturday (09/12/2023), the Philippine Bureau of Fisheries and Aquatic Resources commissioned three offshore civil patrol vessels, including: BRP Datu Sanday (MMOV-3002), BRP Datu Bankaw (MMOV- 3004) and BRP Datu Tamblot to send fuel and food logistics to more than 30 fishing vessels belonging to Filipino fishermen in the Scarborough shoal waters.

Spokesperson for the National Task Force for the West Philippine Sea, Jonathan Malaya, said the "clash" occurred at around 9 am when a patrol boat belonging to the Philippine Bureau of Fisheries and Aquatic Resources approached the Bajo de Masinloc waters, which is about 1.4 to 1.9 nautical miles away. Chinese Coast Guard ships began using high-pressure water cannons in an attempt to deter and prevent ships belonging to the Philippine Aquatic Resources patrol from approaching Philippine fishing boats.

In addition to Chinese Coast Guard ships, vessels from the Chinese Maritime Militia reportedly carried out dangerous maneuvers and launched what is believed to be a long-range acoustic device against patrol vessels belonging to the Philippine Bureau of Fisheries and Aquatic Resources, Malaya said.

China Coast Guard vessel 21555 ramming BRP Datu Sanday on August 25, 2024 near Sabina Shoal

A similar incident occurred in August 25, 2024. While approaching Sabina Shoal on a humanitarian mission to resupply Filipino fishermen with fuel, food and medical supplies, BRP Datu Sanday was rammed and had water cannons deployed on it by at least 8 Chinese vessels, which caused an engine failure on the vessel, disabling it and forcing it to later retreat. BRP Datu Sanday was targeted by the People’s Liberation Army Navy (PLAN) ship 626 and multiple China Coast Guard cutters. The incident was denied by the Chinese government. China Coast Guard spokesperson Gan Yu accused the Philippine vessel of intentionally colliding with their ship, but video released by the Philippine Coast Guard showed the Chinese Coast Guard vessel 21555 doing the ramming. On October 8, the People's Liberation Army Navy warship and China Coast Guard cutter 3301 along Scarborough Shoal fired water cannons at BRP Datu Cabaylo and BRP Datu Sanday, both deployed to resupply Filipino fishermen with fuel, food and medicine.
