= BRP Datu Pagbuaya =

Philippine government ship

History

Philippines
- Name: BRP Datu Pagbuaya
- Namesake: Datu Pagbuaya, a datu of Bohol who founded Dapitan in northern Mindanao
- Operator: Bureau of Fisheries and Aquatic Resources
- Ordered: 2020
- Builder: Josefa Slipways Inc., Sual, Pangasinan, Philippines
- Completed: 2022
- Identification: Hull number: MMOV-3003
- Status: In active service

General characteristics
- Class & type: Datu Cabaylo-class multi-mission offshore vessel
- Length: 30.0 m (98 ft)
- Propulsion: *2 × 4,300 kW (5,800 shp) MTU diesel engines; 1 × 75 kW (101 shp) bow thruster
- Speed: 14+ knots (26+ km/h)
- Endurance: 10 days, 2,500 nautical miles (4,600 km; 2,900 mi); Designed to be on patrol 2,500 hours per year
- Complement: 2 officers, 10 crew
- Sensors & processing systems: L-3 C4ISR suite; AN/SPS-78 surface search and navigation radar

BRP Datu Pagbuaya (MMOV-3003) (also known as DA-BFAR MMOV-3003) is the third ship of the Datu Cabaylo-class of 30-meter multi-mission offshore civilian patrol vessels being built for the Philippine government's Bureau of Fisheries and Aquatic Resources. The ship was built by Josefa Slipways, Inc. in Sual, Pangasinan and was launched on the 3rd quarter of 2022. Its intended mission is to guard Philippine waters against illegal fishing.

== Maritime incidents ==
BRP Datu Pagbuaya being rammed by the China Coast Guard vessel 21559 near Pag-asa Island

On October 12, 2025, the China Coast Guard vessel 21559 water-cannoned and intentionally rammed BRP Datu Pagbuaya less than two nautical miles from Pag-asa Island, within the Philippine maritime zone.
