= Southwest Cay =

Island of the Spratly Islands

Disputed island
- Southwest Cay

- Location within Spratly Islands
- Other names: Đảo Song Tử Tây (Vietnamese); Pugad Island (Philippine English); Pulo ng Pugad (Filipino) 南子島 / 南子岛 Nánzi Dǎo (Chinese)

Geography
- Location: South China Sea
- Coordinates: 11°25′46″N 114°19′53″E
- Archipelago: Spratly Islands
- Area: 19 ha (47 acres)

Administration
- Vietnam
- District: Trường Sa District, Khánh Hòa
- Commune: Song Tử Tây Commune

Claimed by
- China
- Philippines
- Taiwan
- Vietnam

Demographics
- Population: 32

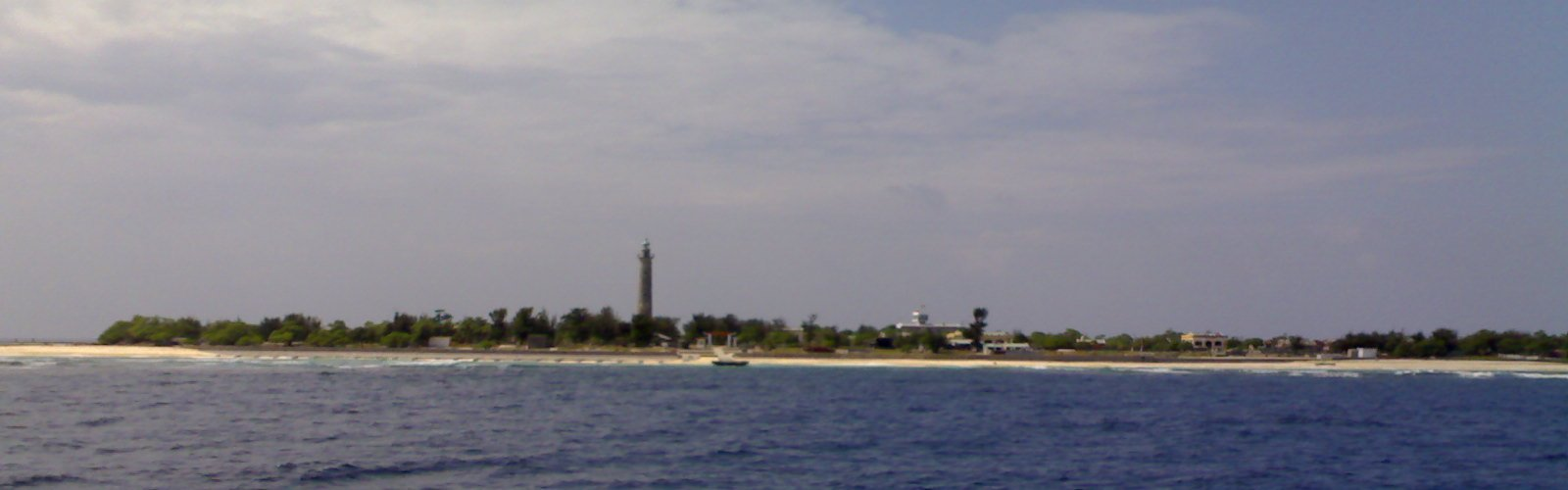

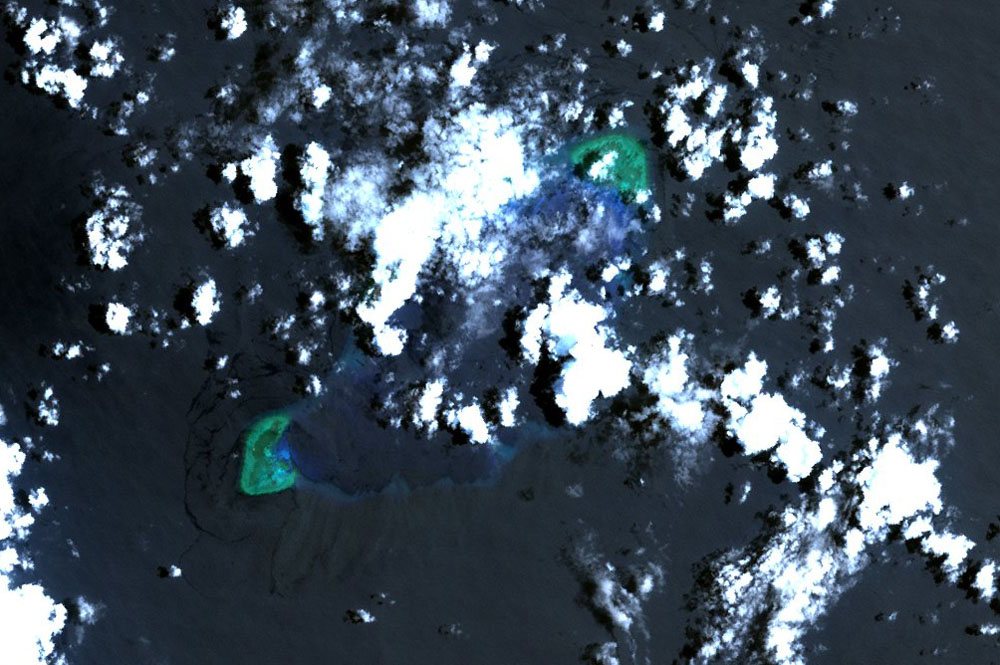
Landsat 7 image (2000)

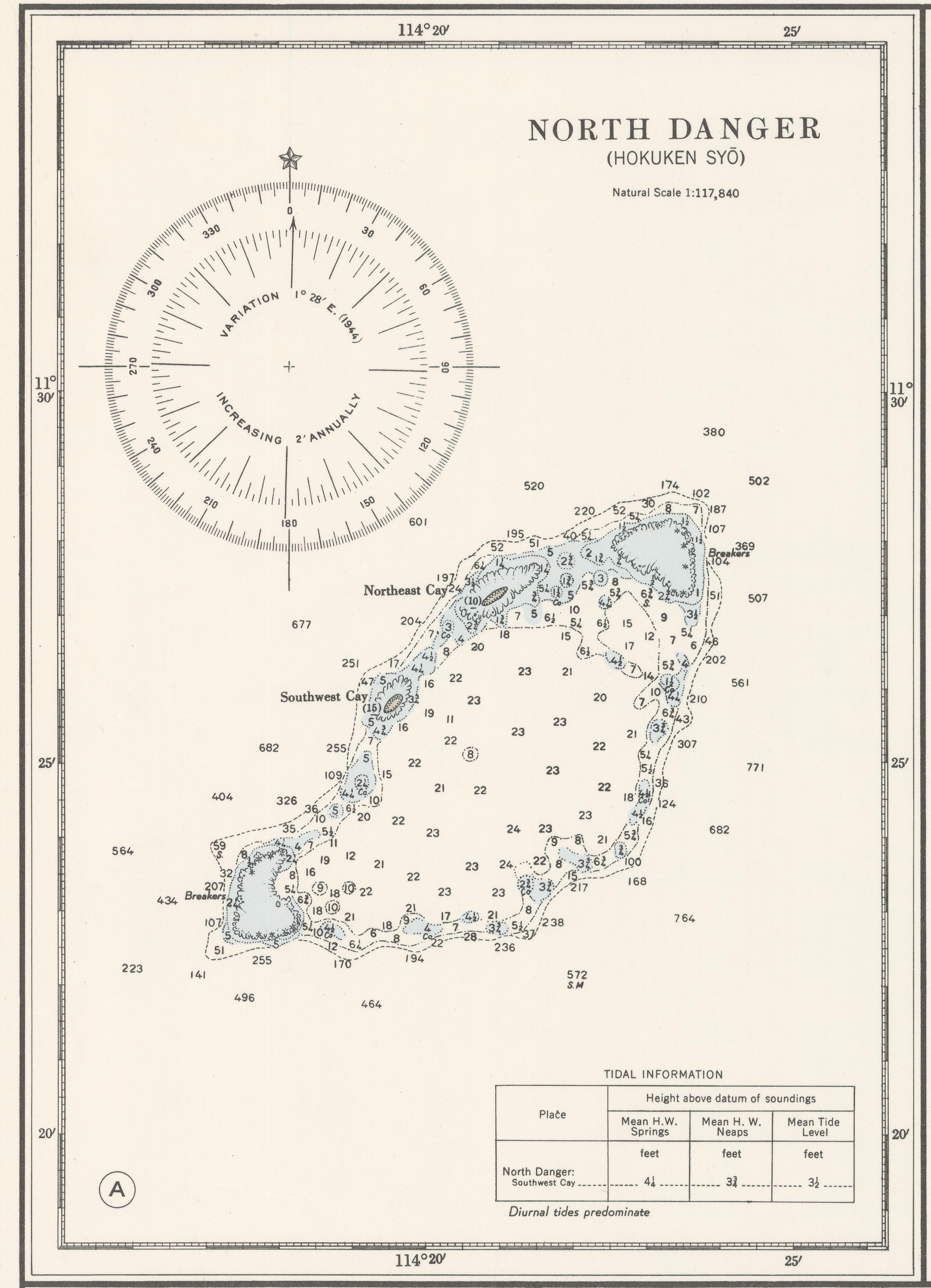
Nautical chart (1911)

Southwest Cay, also known as Vietnamese: Đảo Song Tử Tây; Pugad Island (Filipino: Pulo ng Pugad, lit. 'Island of Nest'); Mandarin Chinese: 南子島/南子岛; pinyin: Nánzi Dǎo, is an island on the northwestern edge of the Spratly Islands in the South China Sea. It is part of the atoll North Danger Reef, and just 1.75 miles (2.82 km) southwest of Northeast Cay. With an natural area of 12 hectares (30 acres), it is the sixth largest of the naturally occurring Spratly Islands, and the second largest of the Vietnamese-occupied islands. Southwest Cay has the archipelago's highest point, at 4 meters above sea level. It was once a breeding place for birds, and was covered with trees and guano; export of guano had been carried out "on a considerable scale".

The island is also claimed by China (PRC), Taiwan (ROC), and the Philippines.

== History ==
=== 1933 – French possession ===
In 1933, the French Government took possession of the Spratly Islands including Southwest Cay and Northeast Cay. Three ships, the Alerte, the Astrolabe and the De Lanessan took part in the expedition. The following quotations are from an account given by H. Cucherousset in L'Eveil economique de l'Indochine (No. 790 of May 28, 1933):

"Further north still, at the level of Nha Trang, is the atoll named "North Danger", the Alerte took possession of two sandy islands (cayes) where it found some Japanese fishing. The De Lanessan went there too and explored the little island. The latter is perceptibly higher than the others, the highest point reaching 5 metres. The phosphate beds are considerable and were much exploited by the Japanese."

After possession had been taken, the French Ministry of Foreign Affairs published the following notice in the French Journal Officiel dated 26 July 1933 (page 7837):

"Notice concerning the occupation of certain islands by French naval units.

The French government has caused the under mentioned isles and islets to be occupied by French naval units:
Group of two islands situated at latitude 111°29' north and longitude 114°21' east of Greenwich, with their dependent isles (36) (Possession taken April 10, 1933).

The above-mentioned isles and islets henceforward come under French sovereignty (this notice cancels the previous notice inserted in the Official Journal dated July 25, 1933, page 7784)."

=== 1939–1945 – Japanese occupation ===
In 1939, Japan occupied the islands and remained there until the end of World War II.

=== 1963 – South Vietnam occupation ===
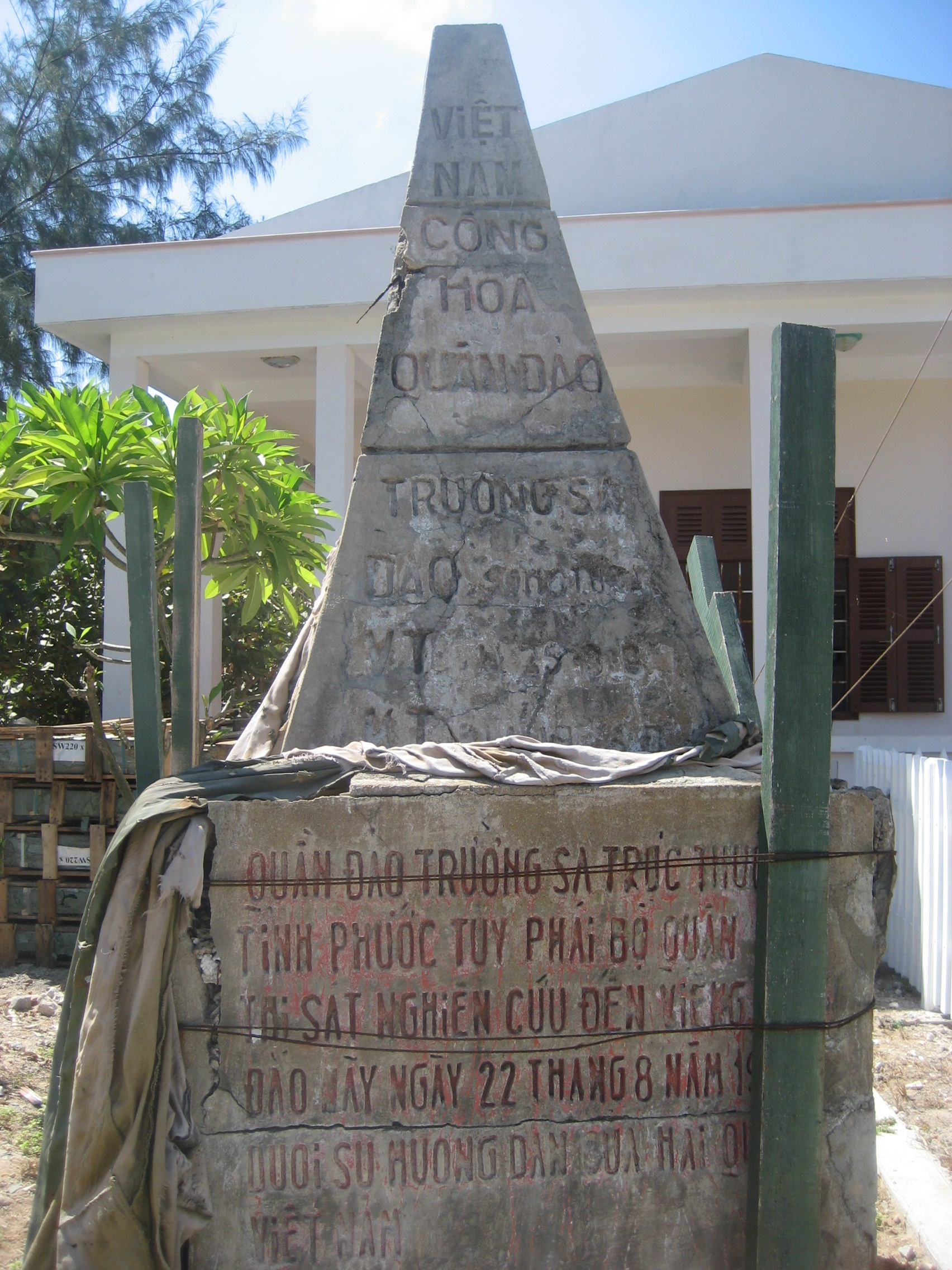
Territorial monument (stele).

On May 24, 1963, the sovereignty steles were rebuilt on Song Tử Đông (Northeast Cay) and Song Tử Tây (Southwest Cay) by crew members of the three vessels Huong Giang, Chi Lang and Ky Hoa of South Vietnam.

=== 1968 – Philippine occupation ===
In 1968, Filipino troops occupied Northeast Cay (Parola, Song Tử Đông) and Southwest Cay (Pugad, Song Tử Tây). "As this relates to Cloma, no official act by the Philippine government could be found which contemporaneously and specifically ratified his declaration. However, in 1968 the Philippine government began sending troops to occupy the area and in 1971 made an official announcement that the Philippines were occupying several of the features in KIG for “reasons of national security and to “protect the interests of the state and its citizens.”

=== 1975 – Capture by South Vietnam ===
Pugad Island incident
Date	1975
Location	Southwest Cay
Result	South Vietnamese Capture of Pugad Island

Belligerents
Philippines	South Vietnam

Southwest Cay is near the northern edge of the Spratly Islands in the South China Sea. It is just northwest of Dangerous Ground in the North Danger Reef group, which also contains the Filipino-occupied Northeast Cay (Parola), the South Vietnamese-occupied South Reef, and the unoccupied North Reef. Southwest Cay and Northeast Cay are just 1.75 miles (2.82 km) apart, and each island is visible from the other.

Sometime in 1975, all the Filipino soldiers guarding Southwest Cay (Pugad) left to attend to the birthday party of their commanding officer who was based on Northeast Cay (Parola). A storm that day is also believed to have influenced the soldiers to regroup temporarily on Parola. A report also came out saying that South Vietnamese officials managed to send prostitutes to the birthday party to lure the Filipino soldiers guarding Pugad. It was said to be a "present" to the Filipino commander for his birthday, and as a move of South Vietnamese forces to befriend all Filipino soldiers guarding the Spratlys. Filipino soldiers did not expect that South Vietnam would resort to foul play since both the Philippines and South Vietnam, together with the United States, were allies in the Vietnam War. This tactic is believed to be the reason why South Vietnamese forces knew that the Filipino soldiers left the island, an action that is usually kept confidential.

After the party and after the weather cleared out, the returning soldiers were surprised that a company of South Vietnamese soldiers were already on the island. The South Vietnamese flag replaced the Filipino flag flying on the pole erected by Filipino soldiers. The Filipino soldiers returned to Parola immediately for fear that Parola would be the next target. After higher-ups of the Philippines were informed about the situation, they instructed the troops based in Parola and Pagasa (Thitu Island) to stay on red alert status. For the following mornings, the only thing the Filipino soldiers could do on Parola was to "curse" while South Vietnamese soldiers on Pugad sang their national anthem. Malacañang officials, who did not want to compromise the alliance while the Vietnam War was still being fought, decided to remain silent.

=== 1975 – Vietnam reunification ===
A few months later, the recently unified Vietnam (after North Vietnam won over South Vietnam, the North Vietnam task force occupied the island) decided to remove all remaining South Vietnamese troops in the Spratly Islands and establish military control among the features. It was reported that dozens of South Vietnamese soldiers in Southwest Cay (Song Tử Tây) swam all the way to Northeast Cay (Parola) just to avoid being captured by North Vietnamese forces. It was then when Malacañang officials, headed by President Ferdinand Marcos, discussed how the Philippines would reclaim the island. It had been apparent that most of the officials, who considered the North Vietnamese communists to be a threat to Filipino national security, wanted to attack Southwest Cay (Pugad) to reclaim it. However, after an intelligence report came stating that the unified Vietnam had already built a huge concrete garrison within a few weeks, the officials dropped the plan and tried to resolve the issue diplomatically. However, this approach eventually died along the process making Southwest Cay (Song Tử Tây) a Vietnamese-occupied island up to this day. This incident was confirmed in interviews with soldiers involved in an episode of the defunct Magandang Gabi, Bayan of ABS-CBN.

Although Vietnam, China (PRC), Taiwan (ROC), and the Philippines all claim the island, no clashes have been reported since 1975. The island currently hosts periodic joint exercises and sporting activities between the Vietnamese and Philippine militaries.

== See also ==
- Spratly Islands dispute
- List of maritime features in the Spratly Islands
