= Northeast Cay =

Island of Spratly Islands

Disputed island
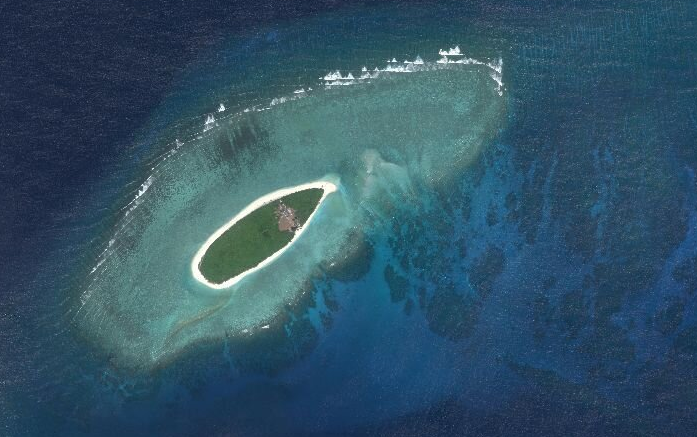
- Northeast Cay

- Location within Spratly Islands
- Other names: Parola Island (Philippine English); Pulo ng Parola (Filipino); Đảo Song Tử Đông (Vietnamese) 北子島 / 北子岛 Běizi Dǎo (Chinese)

Geography
- Location: South China Sea
- Coordinates: 11°27′09″N 114°21′16″E
- Archipelago: Spratly Islands

Administration
- Philippines
- Region: Southwestern Tagalog Region
- Province: Palawan
- Municipality: Kalayaan

Claimed by
- China
- Philippines
- Taiwan
- Vietnam

Additional information

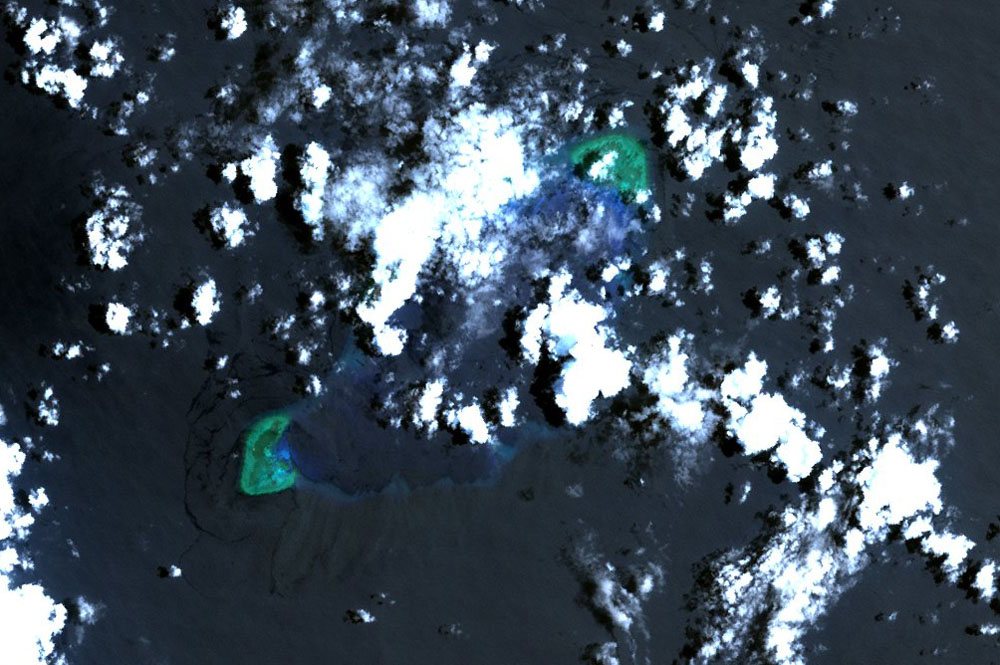
Landsat 7 image of North Danger Reef (2000) (clouds)

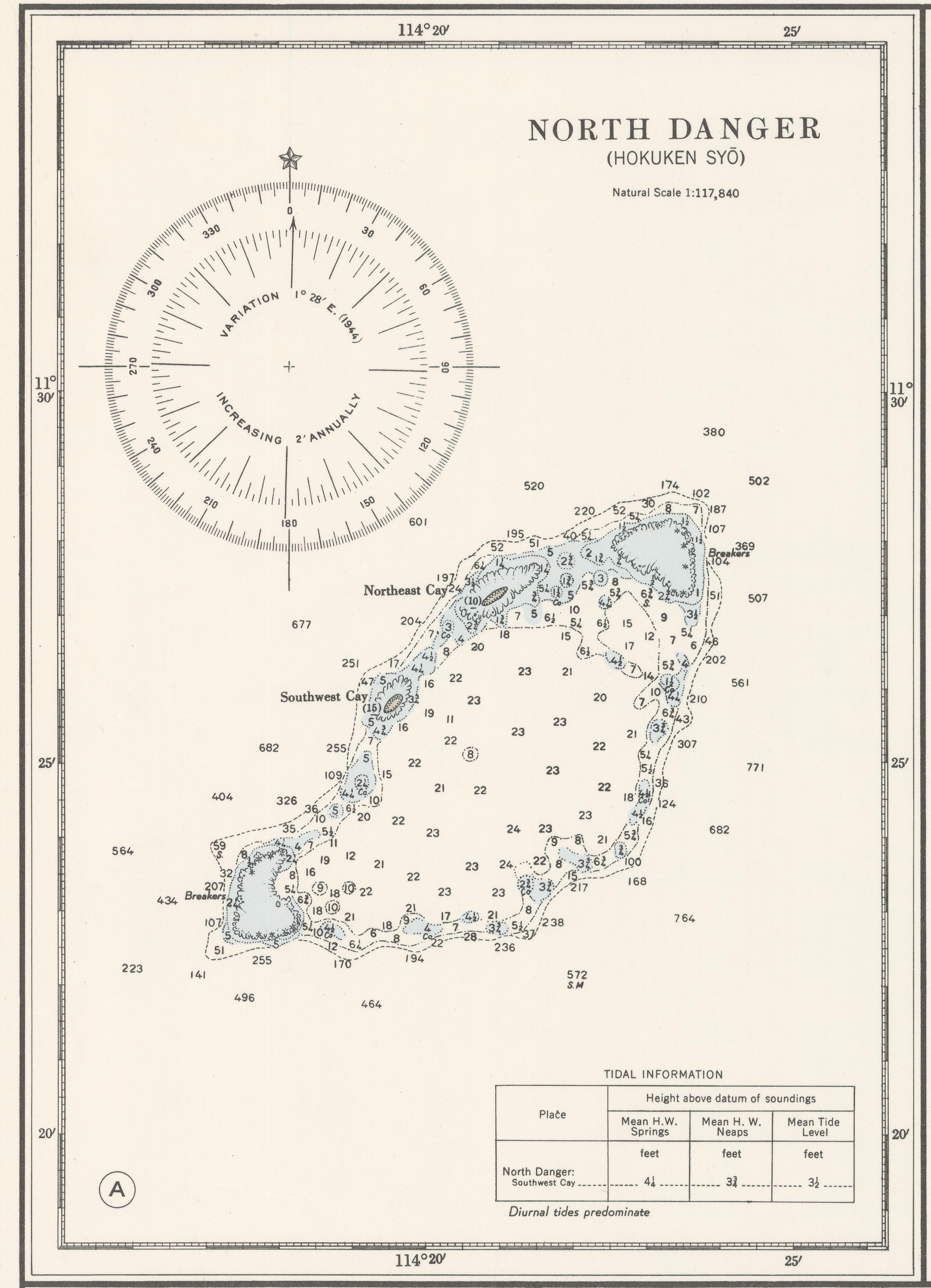
Nautical chart of North Danger Reef (1911)

Northeast Cay, also known as Parola Island (Filipino: Pulo ng Parola, lit. 'Island of [the] Lighthouse'; Mandarin Chinese: 北子島/北子岛; pinyin: Běizǐ Dǎo; Vietnamese: Đảo Song Tử Đông), with a land area of 12.7 hectares (31 acres), is the fifth largest of the naturally occurring Spratly Islands and the third largest of the Philippine-occupied islands. It is part of the North Danger Reef and is located to the northwest of Dangerous Ground.

It is 1.75 miles (2.82 km) north of Vietnamese-occupied Southwest Cay (Tagalog: Pugad), and they are visible from each other. It is located 28 miles (45 km) northwest of Philippine-occupied Thitu Island (Pag-asa), and is administered by the Philippines as part of Kalayaan, Palawan.

The island is also claimed by the People's Republic of China, the Republic of China (Taiwan) and Vietnam.

== Environment ==
Some of the cay's outcrops are visible on its western side. It has high salinity groundwater and vegetation is limited to beach type of plants. The corals around the island were mostly destroyed by dynamite and cyanide fishing methods. It is covered with grass and thick trees. Much of the fringing reef is above water at high tide. It supported a beacon in 1984. It also has guano deposits.

== History ==
In 1933 the French Government decided to take official possession of the Spratly Islands, including Northeast Cay and Southwest Cay. Three ships, the Alerte, the Astrobale and the De Lanessan, took part in the expedition.

"Further north still, at the level of Nhatrang, is the atoll named "North Danger". The Alerte took possession of two sandy islands (cayes) where it found some Japanese fishing. The De Lanessan went there too and explored the little island. The latter is perceptibly higher than the others, the highest point reaching 5 metres. The phosphate beds are considerable and were much exploited by the Japanese."

After possession had been taken, the French Ministry of Foreign Affairs published the following notice:

"Notice concerning the occupation of certain islands by French naval units.
The French government has caused the under mentioned isles and islets to be occupied by French naval units:

Group of two islands situated at latitude 111°29' north and longitude 114°21' east of Greenwich, with their dependent isles (36) (Possession taken April 10, 1933).

The above-mentioned isles and islets henceforward come under French sovereignty. "This notice cancels the previous notice inserted in the Official Journal dated July 25, 1933, page 7784. French Journal Officiel dated July 26, 1933 (page 7837)."

In 1939 Japan occupied the islands until the end of World War II.

In 1956 the French transferred the islands to South Vietnam.

In 1959 the South Vietnam Government renamed "Song Tử" (meaning twin because the two islands are very similar) with "Tây" (meaning west) and "Đông" (meaning East) to differentiate them. They were annexed to Phuoc Tuy province, South Vietnam. On 24 May 1963, the sovereignty steles were rebuilt on Song Tu Dong (North East Cay) and Song Tu Tay (South West Cay) by crew members of the three vessels Huong Giang, Chi Lang and Ky Hoa of the South Vietnam.

In 1968, Philippine troops occupied Northeast Cay (Parola Island, Song Tu Dong) and Southwest Cay (Pugad Island, Song Tu Tay).

In 1975, Southwest Cay was reoccupied by South Vietnam (see Southwest Cay incident (1975)) and it was subsequently taken over by the later unified Vietnam. The Philippines continue to occupy Northeast Cay.

== Current status ==
Northeast Cay is considered by the Philippines as the second top priority for protection, after Thitu Island, since it is very near Vietnamese-occupied Southwest Cay (Pugad Island). In its diplomatic protest to China over the Whitsun Reef incident of March 22, 2021, the Philippine government reminded its counterparts in Beijing that Parola Island (Northeast Cay), and the other islands are integral part of the archipelago.

Through sports diplomacy, the Philippines hosted a volleyball match and sportsfest on November 10, 2018 between the Philippine and Vietnamese Navies on Northeast Cay.

The Philippine Coast Guard constructed 5 lighthouses in the area, and this includes one on Northeast Cay.

As of February 2026, the local government of Kalayaan has identified Northeast Cay (Parola Island) as a feature targeted for potential future civilian settlement to support the national presence in the Kalayaan Island Group. This island is considered by municipal officials to be a strategic priority for development and the improvement of basic services for Filipinos in the West Philippine Sea. While plans remain in the conceptual stage, the local government maintains that full-scale settlement is contingent upon the prior establishment of transport and community support facilities, utilizing the development model of Thitu Island (Pag-asa Island) as a basis for the proposal.

== See also ==
- Southwest Cay
- Spratly Islands
- Kalayaan, Palawan
- Policies, activities and history of the Philippines in Spratly Islands
