= Datu Cabaylo-class patrol vessel =

Class of fisheries patrol vessel

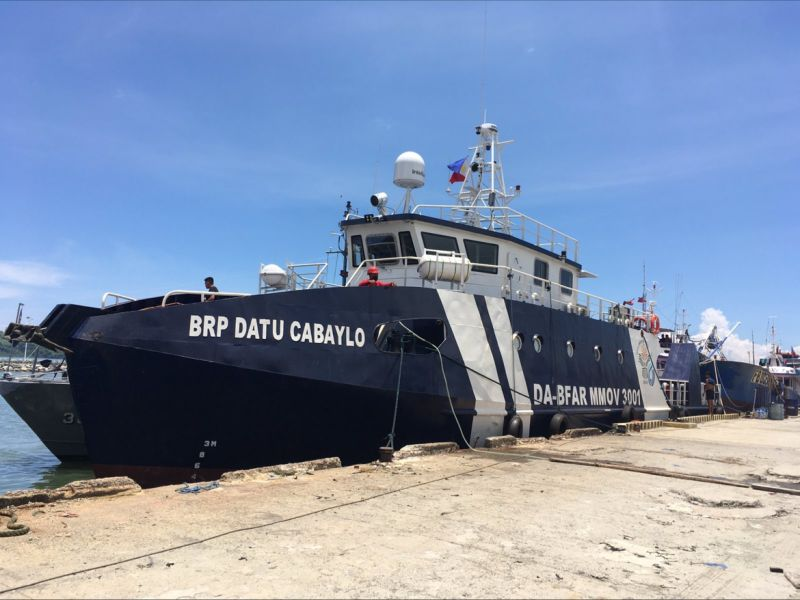

Class overview
- Name: Datu Cabaylo class
- Builders: Josefa Slipways Inc., Sual, Pangasinan, Philippines
- Operators: Philippine Bureau of Fisheries and Aquatic Resources
- Planned: 24
- Building: 1 unit is under construction
- Active: 19

General characteristics
- Type: Multi-mission offshore vessel
- Displacement: 170 tonnes
- Length: 30.0 m (98 ft 5 in)
- Propulsion: *2 × 4,300 kW (5,800 shp) MTU diesel engines; 1 × 75 kW (101 shp) bow thruster
- Speed: 14+ knots
- Endurance: 10 days, 2,500 nautical miles (4,600 km; 2,900 mi); Designed to be on patrol 2,500 hours per year
- Complement: 2 officers, 10 crew
- Sensors & processing systems: L-3 C4ISR suite; AN/SPS-78 surface search and navigation radar

The Datu Cabaylo-class multi-mission offshore vessel is a new class of fisheries patrol vessel being constructed for the Philippine Bureau of Fisheries and Aquatic Resources (BFAR) under the Department of Agriculture.

The ships are being constructed by Josefa Slipways Inc.'s shipyard in Sual, Pangasinan province in the Philippines, and is believed to be using a design provided by Australian ship designer Incat Crowther.

The ships are designed to patrol Philippine waters and exclusive economic zone to protect against illegal fishing, and protection of marine resources. The ships will also be assisting the Philippine Coast Guard (PCG) in maritime patrol, and maritime law enforcement within Philippine waters and exclusive economic zone, as the ships are jointly crewed by personnel from the BFAR and PCG.

The vessel was named after the last tribal king of the Cuyonon Kingdom of Taytay in Palawan, Philippines.

== Ships in class ==
Hull number	Name	Builder	Launched	Commissioned	Status
MMOV-3001	BRP Datu Cabaylo	Josefa Slipways	14 June 2022		Active as of September 2023
MMOV-3002	BRP Datu Sanday	Josefa Slipways			Active as of September 2023
MMOV-3003	BRP Datu Pagbuaya	Josefa Slipways			Active as of September 2023
MMOV-3004	BRP Datu Bankaw	Josefa Slipways			Active as of September 2023
MMOV-3005	BRP Datu Tamblot	Josefa Slipways			Active as of September 2023
MMOV-3006	BRP Datu Matanam Taradapit	Josefa Slipways			Active as of September 2023
MMOV-3007	BRP Datu Romapenet	Josefa Slipways			Active as of September 2023
MMOV-3008	BRP Datu Sumkad	Josefa Slipways	July 2024		launched in July 2024
MMOV-3009	BRP Datu Balensusa	Josefa Slipways	July 2024		launched in July 2024
MMOV-3010	BRP Datu Bangkaya	Josefa Slipways	July 2024		launched in July 2024
MMOV-3011	BRP Datu Daya	Josefa Slipways	July 2024		launched in July 2024
MMOV-3012	BRP Datu Dumangsil	Josefa Slipways			
MMOV-3013	TBA	Josefa Slipways			
MMOV-3014	BRP Datu Gumbay Piang	Josefa Slipways			Active as of September 2025
MMOV-3015	BRP Datu Magat Salamat	Josefa Slipways			
MMOV-3016	BRP Datu Manooc	Josefa Slipways			
MMOV-3017	BRP Datu Paduhinog	Josefa Slipways			
MMOV-3018	BRP Datu Paiburong	Josefa Slipways			
MMOV-3019	BRP Datu Sumakwel	Josefa Slipways			launched in 17 January 2025
MMOV-3020	BRP Datu Gagandilan	Josefa Slipways			launched in 24 January 2025

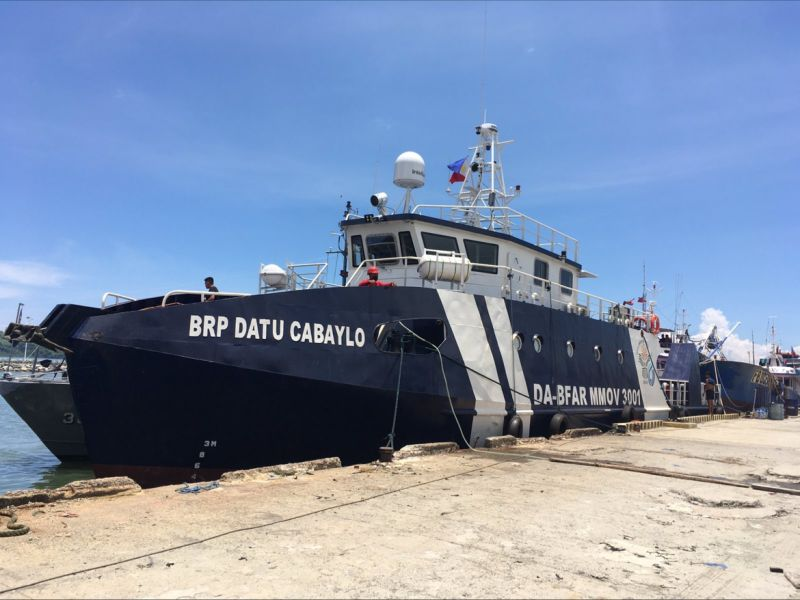
BFAR BRP Datu Cabaylo-class
