= BRP Datu Bankaw =

Offshore civilian patrol vessel

History

Philippines
- Name: Datu Bankaw
- Namesake: Datu Bankaw, chieftain (datu) of Limasawa Island and parts of present-day Southern Leyte province
- Operator: Bureau of Fisheries and Aquatic Resources
- Ordered: 2020
- Builder: Josefa Slipways Inc., Sual, Pangasinan, Philippines
- Launched: 2022
- Identification: Hull number: MMOV-3004
- Status: Active as of September 2023

General characteristics
- Class & type: Datu Cabaylo-class multi-mission offshore vessel
- Length: 30.0 m (98 ft)
- Propulsion: *2 × 4,300 kW (5,800 shp) MTU diesel engines; 1 × 75 kW (101 shp) bow thruster
- Speed: 14+ knots
- Endurance: 10 days, 2,500 nautical miles (4,600 km; 2,900 mi); Designed to be on patrol 2,500 hours per year
- Complement: 2 officers, 10 crew
- Sensors & processing systems: L-3 C4ISR suite; AN/SPS-78 surface search and navigation radar

BRP Datu Bankaw (MMOV-3004) (also known as DA-BFAR MMOV-3004) is the fourth ship of a new class of 30-meter multi-mission offshore civilian patrol vessels operated by the Philippine government's Bureau of Fisheries and Aquatic Resources.

== Construction ==
The ship was built by Josefa Slipways, Inc. in Sual, Pangasinan using a design from Australian ship designer Incat Crowther, and is believed to have been launched in 2022.

== Mission ==
Its intended mission is to guard Philippine waters against illegal fishing, maritime protection and fisheries control, with secondary mission of supporting law enforcement agencies like the Philippine Coast Guard in patrolling Philippine territorial waters and Exclusive Economic Zones.

The ship has been seen providing support to Filipino fishermen in the Bajo de Masinloc / Panatag Shoal (Scarborough Shoal) in late September 2023. On 30 April 2024, the Datu Bankaw was delivering food and fuel to Filipino fishermen at Scarborough when it was fired upon by Chinese coast guard ships with water cannons, and the ship collided twice with Chinese boats. Datu Bankaw's railings were damaged, along with "some ship equipment".
