= Thitu Island =

Island in the Spratlys

Disputed island
- Location within Spratly Islands
- Other names: Pag-asa Island (Philippine English); Pulo ng Pag-asa (Filipino/Tagalog); Zhongye Island (Chinese); Đảo Thị Tứ (Vietnamese)

Geography
- Location: South China Sea
- Coordinates: 11°03′08″N 114°17′00″E
- Archipelago: Spratly Islands
- Area: 0.37 km^{2} (0.14 sq mi)

Administration
- Philippines
- Region: Southwestern Tagalog Region
- Province: Palawan
- Municipality: Kalayaan

Claimed by
- Philippines
- China
- Taiwan
- Vietnam

Demographics
- Population: 406

Additional information
- Time zone: PHT (UTC+8)

Thitu Island, also known as Pag-asa Island (Filipino: Pulo ng Pag-asa, lit. 'Island of Hope'), Đảo Thị Tứ (Vietnamese: Đảo Thị Tứ), and Zhongye Island (Chinese: 中业岛/中業島; pinyin: Zhōngyè Dǎo), is the second largest of the naturally occurring islands in the Spratly Islands, having an area of 37.2 hectares (92 acres). It lies about 500 kilometers (310 mi) west of Puerto Princesa. Its neighbors are the North Danger Reef to the north, Subi Reef to the southwest, and the Loaita and Tizard Banks to the south. The island serves as the administrative center of the Kalayaan municipality of Palawan province in the Philippines; it also administers nearly a dozen other islets, cays, and reefs in the Spratlys. Thitu is 270 nautical miles (500 km; 310 mi) west of Palawan.

In 1971, following a typhoon, the island was seized by the Philippines from Taiwan.

In May 2020, a new sheltered port and harbor were built on the island, as well as a beaching ramp at the tip of the airstrip. In early 2023, the runway was paved in concrete. Civilian infrastructure on the island includes the airstrip, a lighthouse, a clinic, a communication tower, and a small integrated elementary and high school.

Thitu is the largest of the Philippine-administered islands in the Spratlys. While most of the occupants of the Spratlys are military personnel or tourists, Thitu is the only one with a permanent civilian population. China, Taiwan, and Vietnam also claim the island.

== Name ==
The Filipino name of the island is Pag-asa ("hope"). It is also variously named in the following languages: Mandarin simplified Chinese: 中业岛; traditional Chinese: 中業島; pinyin: Zhōngyè Dǎo; Vietnamese: Đảo Thị Tứ; Hokkien Chinese: 鐵峙/铁峙/鐵 堆; Pe̍h-ōe-jī: Thih-tu; lit. 'iron shoal'.

It is sometimes incorrectly referred to as "Tiezhi Island", from the Mandarin reading (Chinese: 鐵峙島/铁峙岛; pinyin: Tiězhì Dǎo; lit. 'iron shoal Island'); Tiezhi Reef (铁峙礁; 鐵寺礁) refers to another area 7.5 km northeast of this island. The modern Mandarin Chinese name of the island is taken from one of the battleships, named Chung-yeh (Chinese: 中業號; pinyin: Zhōngyè Hào), sent by the Chinese government to regain control of the island in 1946.

== History ==
=== Early and colonial history ===
There are historical records of the island having been inhabited, at various times in history, by fishers from Champa in present-day Vietnam and by the Chinese, and during the Second World War by troops from French Indochina and Imperial Japan.

In June 1763, the British East India Company ship Earl Temple sank on the reefs of Thitu Island en route to Manila. Three crew members survived for months on the island, built a raft, and used bird feathers to make a sail. The castaways were able to reach Vietnam, later China, and from there return to England. In 1997, the wreck of the Earl Temple was discovered by Philippine authorities, and artifacts were recovered and are displayed at the National Museum.

From 1930 to 1933, the colonial government in French Indochina sent naval troops to the Spratlys, including to Thitu Island. On 21 December 1933, Governor M. J. Krautheimer in Cochinchina (now Vietnam) decided to annex the Spratlys to Bà Rịa Province.

=== Post-World War 2 history ===
==== Republic of China, Free Territory of Freedomland, and South Vietnam claim ====
After Japan's surrender to the allies in 1945 saw the island returned to the Republic of China (ROC), officials who were responsible for reclaiming the South China Sea islands set out to recover the island from the Japanese. The Ministry of the Interior (Republic of China) re-erected national markers on the major islands, drew up detailed maps of them, renamed them, and published a location map of the South China Sea islands. A territorial stone marker on Zhongye was erected on 12 December 1946.

In May 1956, Tomás Cloma, a Philippine national, landed on several of the islands, claiming that he had discovered them and enjoyed the rights associated with discovery–occupation, thus forming the micronation of Free Territory of Freedomland. The ROC ambassador to the Philippines immediately issued a statement stressing that the islands were ROC territory and sent a letter of protest to Philippine Vice President and Foreign Secretary Carlos Polestico Garcia. The Philippine government stated that these were individual actions by Cloma that had nothing to do with the Philippine government.

On 1 October 1956, ROC ships approached Cloma's expedition at North Danger Reef. They invited Cloma and several crew members aboard one of the naval vessels for a conference. A discussion over the island's ownership ensued, during which Cloma was below deck, unaware that a boarding party had searched his vessel and confiscated all arms and ammunition, maps, and documents. Cloma was interrogated and kept under detention until allowed to rejoin his boat. The next day, he was again invited aboard the Chinese ship. Despite being under threat to their lives, Cloma and his officers refused to recognize that Freedomland was Chinese territory and to sign a statement promising never to return to it. Cloma was forced to surrender his weapons, for which he was given a receipt, whereupon the Chinese ship left. Cloma later found that the houses he had built had been removed or burned down.

Cloma went on to agitate for the Government of the Philippines to support his claims to Freedomland.

On 22 May 1963, the Republic of Vietnam Navy installed a sovereignty stele on Thitu Island.

==== 1971 seizure by the Philippines ====
On 18 April 1971, due to a strong typhoon hitting Thitu Island, the Republic of China (by this point Taiwan) authorities ordered all garrisons to withdraw to Taiping Island. The Philippine government, in the meantime, took advantage of this vacancy to seize the island on 29 July, renaming it Pag-asa Island. After this was discovered by the Taiwanese, an order was given to engage the Philippine army, though this was subsequently rescinded, and no military engagement took place.

The island was formally annexed by the Philippines when the country created the municipality of Kalayaan on 11 June 1978, by virtue of Presidential Decree 1596.

==== 21st century ====
Seven new buildings were constructed on Thitu Island in 2017.

In 2018, the Philippine Coast Guard constructed five lighthouses in the area, including one on Thitu Island.

In 2018–19, the Philippines began build a beaching ramp, enabling the delivery of equipment for work on the construction, rehabilitation, and repairs of the Rancudo Airfield airstrip, soldiers' barracks, conventional and renewable power generators, desalination facilities, lighthouses, sewage disposal system, shelters, and storage facilities for fishers. By May 2020, the ramp was completed, and the Filipino naval ship BRP Ivatan landed on it. Work on the port and upgrades to the island's airstrip progressed.

On 12 June 2020, the Philippine Department of Transportation confirmed that a new seaport and sheltered port had been completed. In August, the Kalayaan municipal government named six sandbars and two reefs associated with Pag-asa Island.

On 12 June 2021, the National Power Corporation switched on its ₱33 million Kalayaan diesel power plant project that covered the supply, delivery, and installation of 300 kilowatt diesel generating sets, a 13.8-kilovolt (kV) distribution line, and fuel oil storage tanks, providing round-the-clock power to the facilities on the island.

In 2023, the runway on the island was lengthened to 1,300 metres (4,300 ft) to accommodate C130 cargo aircraft. A permanent Philippine Marine Corps garrison is maintained, and the only jobs on the island other than fishing are governmental. Nevertheless, the Philippine government has continued to encourage civilians to settle the island.

== Topography ==
Thitu Island is a low-lying island with trees, shrubs, and sandbars. It is surrounded by coral reefs populated with rusting shipwrecks visible above water.

== Civilian administration ==
The island serves as the town proper to the municipality of Kalayaan. Only Thitu, among all Philippine-occupied Spratly islands, is inhabited by civilians, of which there are about 300, including children. They live in a few dozen houses, linked with sandy paths. Thitu administers nearly a dozen other islets, cays, and reefs in the Spratlys. It is the only Philippine-occupied island in the Spratlys to have a significant number of structures, including a municipal hall, multi-purpose hall, health center, integrated school, police station, coast guard station, marine research station, water-filtration plant, engineering building, marina, communication tower, and military barracks. Residents raise pigs, goats, and chickens, and plant crops in an allotted space to supplement supplies of goods provided by a naval vessel that visits once a month. By day, residents get electricity from an electric generator owned by the municipality. By night, they shift to stored solar power that comes from 1.5-volt solar panels. Fresh water is obtained from tanks in front of each house. A diesel power plant was activated in June 2021, providing full power from day to night.

In April 2021, the Department of Information and Communications Technology announced the installation of free Wi-Fi facilities at Pag-asa Integrated School, Barangay Hall, and other sites on the island. This has allowed children to continue with their distance learning.

In April 2026, the Philippine Coast Guard upgraded its station to boost monitoring of incursions and maritime safety as well as search and rescue.

== Military ==
Being the second largest of the Spratly Islands, Thitu Island is tightly protected by the Philippine forces. The island's beaches have unused concrete bunkers, which were built in the 1970s, a few years after the Philippine military base was established. Two-thirds of the Philippine military stationed in Philippine-occupied islands (i.e., 40 out of 60 soldiers) are assigned to Thitu.

=== Rancudo Airfield ===
Rancudo Airfield
- IATA: none; ICAO: RPPN

Summary
- Airport type: Military
- Operator: Philippine Air Force
- Location: Pag-asa Island, Kalayaan, Palawan

Map
- Location within South China Sea

Runways
| Direction | Length | | Surface |
| Direction | m | ft | Surface |
|---|---|---|---|
| 08/26 | 1,300 | 4,265 | concrete |

Rancudo Airfield, named after the former Philippine Air Force Commanding General Jose L. Rancudo, is a military and civilian airfield with a 1,300 meters (4,300 ft) unpaved airstrip, built in 1978. Repairs to the runway, which operate on only 1,200 m (3,900 ft) due to water erosion, were set to begin by 2018 but were later delayed.

The Philippine Navy has since 1999 proposed to create a long causeway leading to a deep-water region.

== Development plans ==
Ecotourism

Senator Sonny Angara filed a bill on 27 August 2016 that aims to promote the island as an ecotourism zone. If the proposal becomes law, other islands controlled by the Philippines would also be declared as protected areas under the National Integrated Protected Areas System.

Logistics hub

In 2021, the Philippine government announced that it plans to turn the island into a logistics hub to sustain the country's military forces in the area.

Our Lady of Peace and Good Voyage chapel

In 2024, the Antipolo Cathedral donated two images of Our Lady of Peace and Good Voyage to the Philippine Coast Guard upon request, one of which is to be housed in a dedicated chapel built on the island. The groundbreaking ceremony for the chapel took place on 28 March 2026.

Airport

In July 2024, President Marcos Jr. announced the development of an airport on Thitu Island.

== Maritime incidents ==
=== China Coast Guard water cannon and ramming ===
BRP Datu Pagbuaya being rammed by the China Coast Guard vessel 21559 near Thitu Island

On 12 October 2025, the China Coast Guard vessel 21559 water-cannoned and intentionally rammed the BRP Datu Pagbuaya less than two nautical miles from Thitu Island, within the Philippine maritime zone.

== See also ==
- Territorial disputes in the South China Sea
- List of airports in the Spratly Islands
- List of maritime features in the Spratly Islands
- Philippines and the Spratly Islands
- West Philippine Sea
