= Free Territory of Freedomland =

Micronation in the South China Sea (1956–1974)

- Micronation (unrecognized entity)
- Flag of the Free Territory of Freedomland
- Area claimed: Spratly Islands, South China Sea
- Claimed by: Tomás Cloma
- Dates claimed: May 1956–September 1974

The Free Territory of Freedomland was a micronation declared on some of the Spratly Islands in the South China Sea by Tomás Cloma. Freedomland was proclaimed on 11 May 1956, and during its existence, it came into conflict with the Republic of China on several occasions. In December 1974, leader Admiral Cloma was forced to renounce his claims to the islands in favor of the Philippine government, and the majority of the islands he had claimed now constitute the Philippine municipality of Kalayaan.

== History ==
In January 1935, the Committee of Reviewing Water and Land Maps of the Republic of China published both Chinese names and English names of 132 insular features in the South China Sea.

In 1947, it was reported that Captain Filemon Cloma (Tomás Cloma Sr.'s brother) was fishing off Palawan when Typhoon Jennie forced him to seek shelter, leading his group of fishing vessels west of Palawan, into the Spratlys. The group discovered a vast frontier which served as good fishing grounds. Filemon and his brother Tomás consulted their maps, but could not find the islands on them. Tomás Cloma Sr. hoped to set up a fish cannery and mine for guano. Japan had considered the area a potential source for extracting guano since the 1920s and agreed to fund an expedition led by Filemon and his crew to explore the islands.

In 1950, Philippine President Elpidio Quirino said that "as long as Taiwan held the Spratlys, the Philippines would not press its own claim".

On March 15, 1956, Filemon Cloma, funded by his brother, landed on the islands with a group of men. On May 11, 1956, Filemon Cloma led 40 men in taking formal possession of the islands, lying some 380 miles (612 km) west of the southern end of Palawan and named them Freedomland. Tomás Cloma Sr. then issued his "Notice to the Whole World." Filemon Cloma led a 40-man Filipino crew in hoisting a Filipino flag on one of the islands of Freedomland, and posted copies of that notice, along with possession notices on each of the islands– 53 islands and islets with a total area of 64,976 square miles. Tomás Cloma Sr. asserted that the territory was without owner since Japan renounced ownership in the San Francisco Peace Conference in 1951.

On May 21, 1956, Tomás Cloma Sr. declared the establishment of the Free Territory of Freedomland. Ten days later, he sent his second representation to the Secretary of Foreign Affairs informing the latter that the territory claimed was named Freedomland. Tomás Cloma Sr. also appointed a government to Freedomland.

On July 6, 1956, Cloma declared to the world his claim and establishment of a separate government with its capital on Flat Island (also known as Patag Island).

On October 1, 1956, at North Danger Reef in the South China Sea, two Taiwanese ships— namely, the Ning Yuan (寧遠) flotilla of the Taiwanese Navy, containing naval vessels Taihe and Yongshun– approached Filemon Cloma's expedition with the boat PMI-IV and invited Captain Cloma (and Chief Engineer Benito Danseco, and other crew members) aboard the naval vessel Tai He for a conference.

After the Taiwanese government burned buildings and confiscated property, Tomás and Filemon Cloma agitated for the Government of the Philippines to support their claims to Freedomland.

In 1972, Tomás Cloma Sr. was jailed by Philippine President Ferdinand E. Marcos for four months for "impersonating a military officer by being called an "admiral". In August 1974, Tomás Cloma Sr. and the Supreme Council of Freedomland drafted a new Constitution, declaring the country to be a Principality and encouraging its colonization. New citizens were naturalised, and some of them were elected to the Supreme Council, John de Mariveles among them. In August, Cloma changed the name of the country from Freedomland to Colonia and retired as titular head of state in favor of John de Mariveles with the title of Prince.

In December 1974, Tomás Cloma Sr. was arrested and forced to sign a document to convey to the Philippines whatever rights he might have had in the territory for one peso. There are Philippine claims that they acquired the territory through that document.

In 1978, the Philippine president Ferdinand Marcos issued Presidential Decree No. 1596 to include the majority of the Spratly Islands as being Philippine territory.

=== Colonia St. John ===
The Freedomland principality later became known as the Kingdom of Colonia St. John, Cloma stepped down as leader of the micronation in August 1974 and was succeeded by John I, the first king of Colonia.

=== Kalayaan ===
On June 11, 1978, Philippine president Ferdinand E. Marcos issued a decree formally incorporating the Kalayaan Island Group, an area of the Spratly Islands which covers the land claimed by Freedomland and Colonia St. John, into its national territory as the Municipality of Kalayaan. Republic Act No. 9522, which defined the archipelagic baselines of the Philippines, also claimed sovereignty over the Kalayaan Island Group.

== Key figures ==
Tomás Cloma
- Born: Tomás Cloma y Arbolente; September 18, 1904; Panglao, Bohol, Philippines
- Died: September 18, 1996 (aged 92); Philippines
- Education: Philippine Maritime Institute
- Occupations: Businessman; Lawyer; Admiral

=== Tomás Cloma ===
Tomás Arbolente Cloma Sr. (born Tomás Cloma y Arbolente; 18 September 1904 – 18 September 1996) was the leader and founder of Freedomland. He was a Filipino lawyer and businessman from the province of Bohol. Cloma was born in Panglao to Ciriaco Cloma y Arbotante, a Spanish immigrant, and Irenea Arbolente y Bongay, a native of Panglao, Bohol. He was the owner of a fishing fleet, and owner of a private maritime training institute, the PMI Colleges (formerly known as Philippine Maritime Institute). He aspired to open a cannery and develop guano deposits in the Spratlys. It was principally for economic reasons, therefore, that he claimed islands in the Spratlys.

=== Filemon Cloma ===
Filemon Cloma
- Born: Filemon Ciriaco Colma; March 21, 1921; Panglao, Bohol, Philippines
- Died: April 14, 1979 (aged 58); Philippines
- Education: Philippine Maritime Institute
- Occupations: Businessman; Soldier

Filemon Ciriaco Cloma (21 March 1921 – 14 April 1979) explored Freedomland. He was a Filipino soldier and businessman who served in the US Army Corps. under General Douglas MacArthur, during World War II (WWII). Cloma was born in Panglao to Ciriaco Cloma y Arbotante, a Spanish immigrant, and Irenea Arbolente y Bongay, a native of Panglao. He faked his age and US citizenship to fight in the Signal Corps (United States Army) during the WWII Japanese invasion of the Philippines and was chosen by Gen. MacArthur to serve as a code and cipher specialist. He escaped the Bataan Death March and was engaged in guerilla warfare under the command of Lt. Col. Wendell Fertig in the 10th Military District (Tenth United States Army) until the end of World War II. After the war, he founded a sea exploration business that hired the soldiers trained by PMI Colleges, owned by his brother Tomás Cloma Sr. Filemon Cloma later led men on an expedition funded by Tomás Cloma Sr. to explore Freedomland and claim it for the Philippines.

== Legacy ==
Cloma introduced a distinction between his Freedomland and the Spratlys further west. This distinction later became part of the Philippines' foreign policy. This distinction was never fully clarified. It seems that Freedomland encompasses most of what others call the Spratly Islands, but not Spratly Island itself, nor the banks and reefs lying to the west of it.

Cloma's declaration was met with hostile reactions from several neighboring countries, especially Taiwan. On September 24, 1956, Taiwan reoccupied nearby Itu Aba Island (also known as Taiping Island), which it had left in 1950, and intercepted Cloma's men and vessels found within its immediate waters. The People's Republic of China also restated its own claim afterward.

In 2014, the Philippines sought adjudication of a territorial dispute with China at the International Court of Arbitration. In its pleadings, it abandoned efforts to assert succession to the Cloma Claim and instead asserted a 200-mile territorial claim as an exclusive economic zone under the United Nations Convention on the Law of the Sea. As a consequence, Freedomland became the only successor claimant to the Cloma territory.

== See also ==
- Principality of Sealand
- Minerva Reefs
- Republic of Morac-Songhrati-Meads
