= BRP Lapu-Lapu =

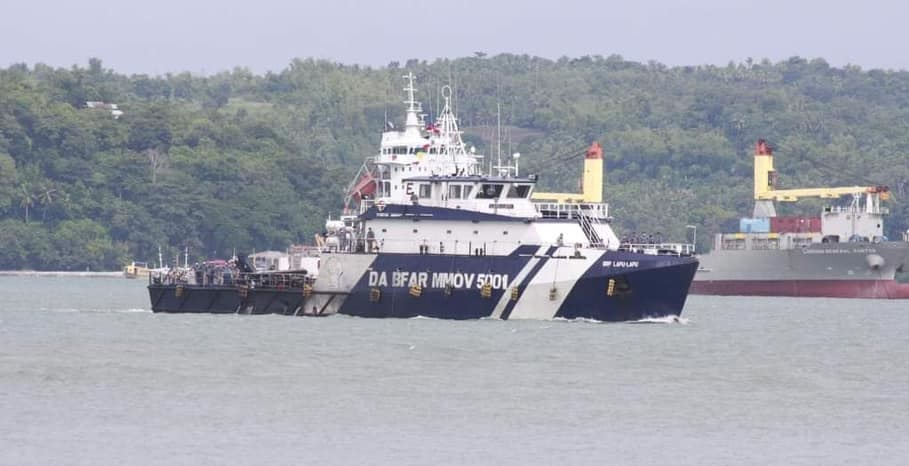
- BRP Lapu-Lapu

History

Philippines
- Name: BRP Lapu-Lapu (MMOV-5001)
- Namesake: Filipino hero Lapulapu
- Awarded: January 2016
- Builder: Josefa Slipways, Inc., Navotas, Philippines
- Launched: 10 August 2017
- Commissioned: 21 December 2017
- Identification: IMO number: 9831232; MMSI number: 548320500; Callsign: DUA3590; Hull number: MMOV-5001
- Status: in active service

General characteristics
- Class & type: Multi Mission Offshore Vessel
- Length: 50 m (164 ft)
- Beam: 9 m (30 ft)
- Propulsion: TECO Westinghouse diesel-electric
- Speed: 14.0 knots (26 km/h) (maximum); 11 knots (20 km/h) (cruising)
- Range: 12,000 nautical miles (22,000 km)
- Endurance: 40 days
- Boats & landing craft carried: 1 x 26 ft 6 in (8.08 m) rescue boat
- Complement: 24 (5 Officers, 4 Engineers, and 15 Crew), plus up to 15 scientists

BRP Lapu-Lapu (MMOV-5001) (also known as DA BFAR MMOV 5001) is one of two multi-mission offshore civilian patrol vessel of Bureau of Fisheries and Aquatic Resources. The ship was locally manufactured in the Philippines by the Josefa Slipways, Inc. in Navotas. It was launched on August 10, 2017, and was commissioned into service on December 21, 2017. Its intended mission is to guard Philippine waters against illegal fishing.

== See also ==
- BRP Francisco Dagohoy (MMOV-5002)
- Bureau of Fisheries and Aquatic Resources
