= BRP Francisco Dagohoy (MMOV-5002) =

History

Philippines
- Name: BRP Francisco Dagohoy (MMOV-5002)
- Namesake: Filipino hero Francisco Dagohoy Francisco Sendrijas
- Awarded: January 2016
- Builder: Josefa Slipways, Inc., Navotas, Philippines
- Launched: 10 August 2017
- Sponsored by: President Rodrigo Roa Duterte
- Commissioned: 21 December 2017
- Identification: IMO number: 9831244; MMSI number: 548313500; Callsign: DUA3591; Hull number: MMOV-5002
- Status: in active service

General characteristics
- Class & type: Multi Mission Offshore Vessel
- Length: 50.5 m (166 ft)
- Beam: 9 m (30 ft)
- Installed power: Yanmar inline 6
- Propulsion: V16 Mitsubishi diesel
- Speed: 15.0 knots (28 km/h) (maximum); 10 knots (19 km/h) (cruising)
- Range: 12,000 nautical miles (22,000 km)
- Endurance: 40 days
- Boats & landing craft carried: 2 x 26 ft 6 in (8.08 m) rescue boat
- Complement: 24 (5 Officers, 4 Engineers, and 15 Crew), plus up to 15 scientists

BRP Francisco Dagohoy (MMOV-5002) (also known as DA-BFAR MMOV 5002) is one of two multi-mission offshore civilian patrol vessels operated by the Philippine government's Bureau of Fisheries and Aquatic Resources. The ship was built by Josefa Slipways, Inc. in Navotas. It was launched on August 10, 2017 and was commissioned into service on December 21, 2017. Its intended mission is to guard Philippine waters against illegal fishing.

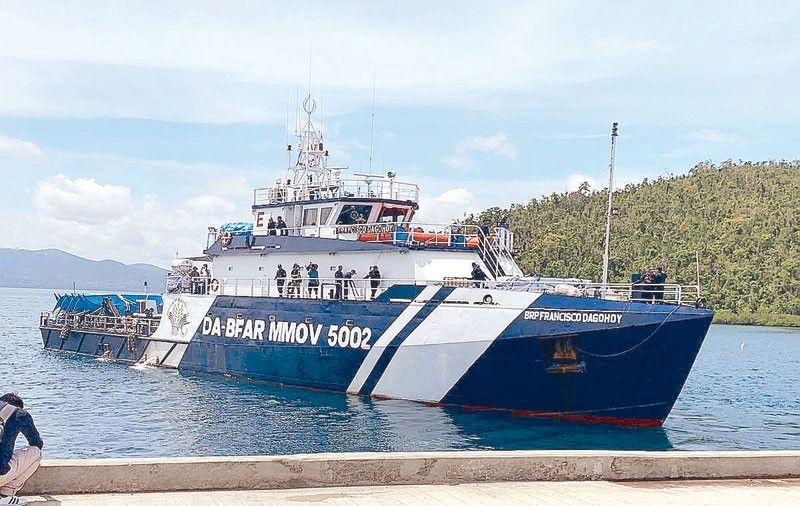
BRP Francisco Dagohoy

== See also ==
- BRP Lapu-Lapu (MMOV-5001)
