= North Danger Reef =

Reef in the Spratly Islands

Disputed atoll
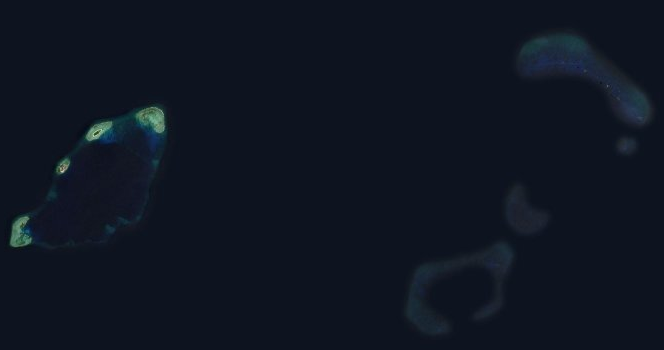

- Location within Spratly Islands
- Other names: Filipino: Bahura ng Peligro; Vietnamese: Cụm Song Tử; Chinese: 双子群礁, pinyin: Shuāngzǐ Qúnjiāo

Geography
- Location: South China Sea
- Coordinates: 11°25′N 114°21′E
- Archipelago: Spratly Islands
- Total islands: 2
- Major islands: Northeast Cay, Southwest Cay

Claimed by
- China
- Philippines
- Taiwan
- Vietnam

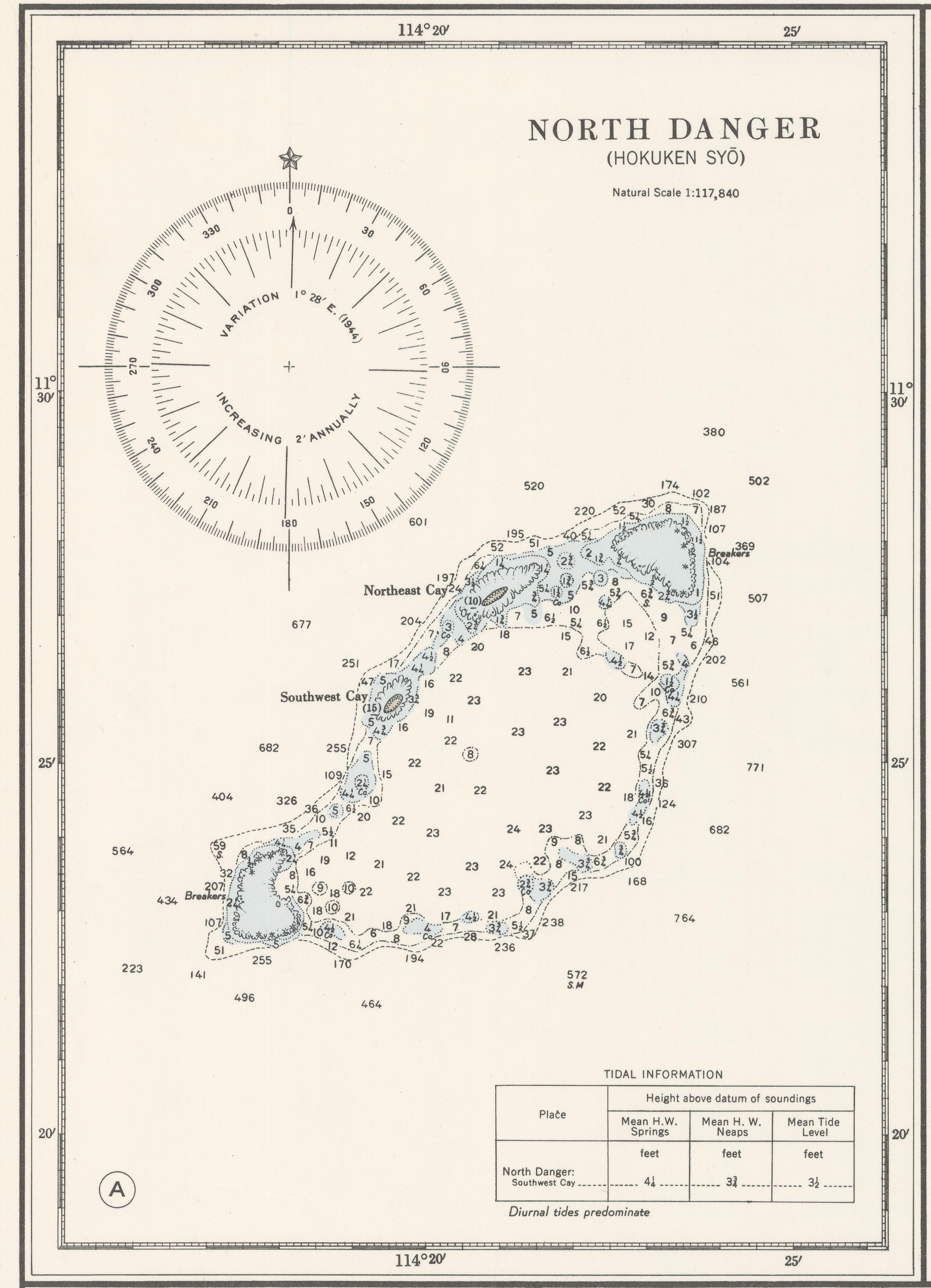
Nautical chart (1911)

North Danger Reef (Filipino: Bahura ng Peligro); (Vietnamese: Cụm Song Tử); (Chinese: 双子群礁; pinyin: Shuāngzǐ Qúnjiāo), is one of the seven major reefs / banks / etc. in the Spratly Islands area of the South China Sea. It is the most North Western of the features of the Spratly Islands, located to the NW of Dangerous Ground.

The reef is a large (8.5 nautical miles) approximately circular atoll with a central lagoon (~20m deep). The surrounding reef is shallow.

== History ==
Fishermen from Champa were likely the first people to discover the reef. However, later on, the Vietnamese would show interest for the reef.

From the 15th century onward, Vietnamese kings began to pay attention to the islands in the South China sea.

In 1776, Le Quy Don wrote at Phu Bien Tap Luc about these islands, as well as the establishment and operation of the Paracel fleet (Vietnamese: Hải Đội Hoàng Sa) and the Northern fleet (Vietnamese: Hải Đội Bắc Hải) of Vietnam.

In 1838, Emperor Minh Mang of Nguyễn dynasty Vietnam ordered the measurement and illustration of a map for the area. It was called the "Dai Nam Nhat Thong Toan Do", in which it claimed the Spratly and Paracel Islands for Vietnam during Nguyễn dynasty era.

When Vietnam was a French colony under French Indochina, the French Government continued to manage North Danger Reef along with the Paracel and Spratly Islands.

In 1935, China announced its claims and named the North Danger Reef. It is called: "Gemini" (Chinese: 双子群礁).

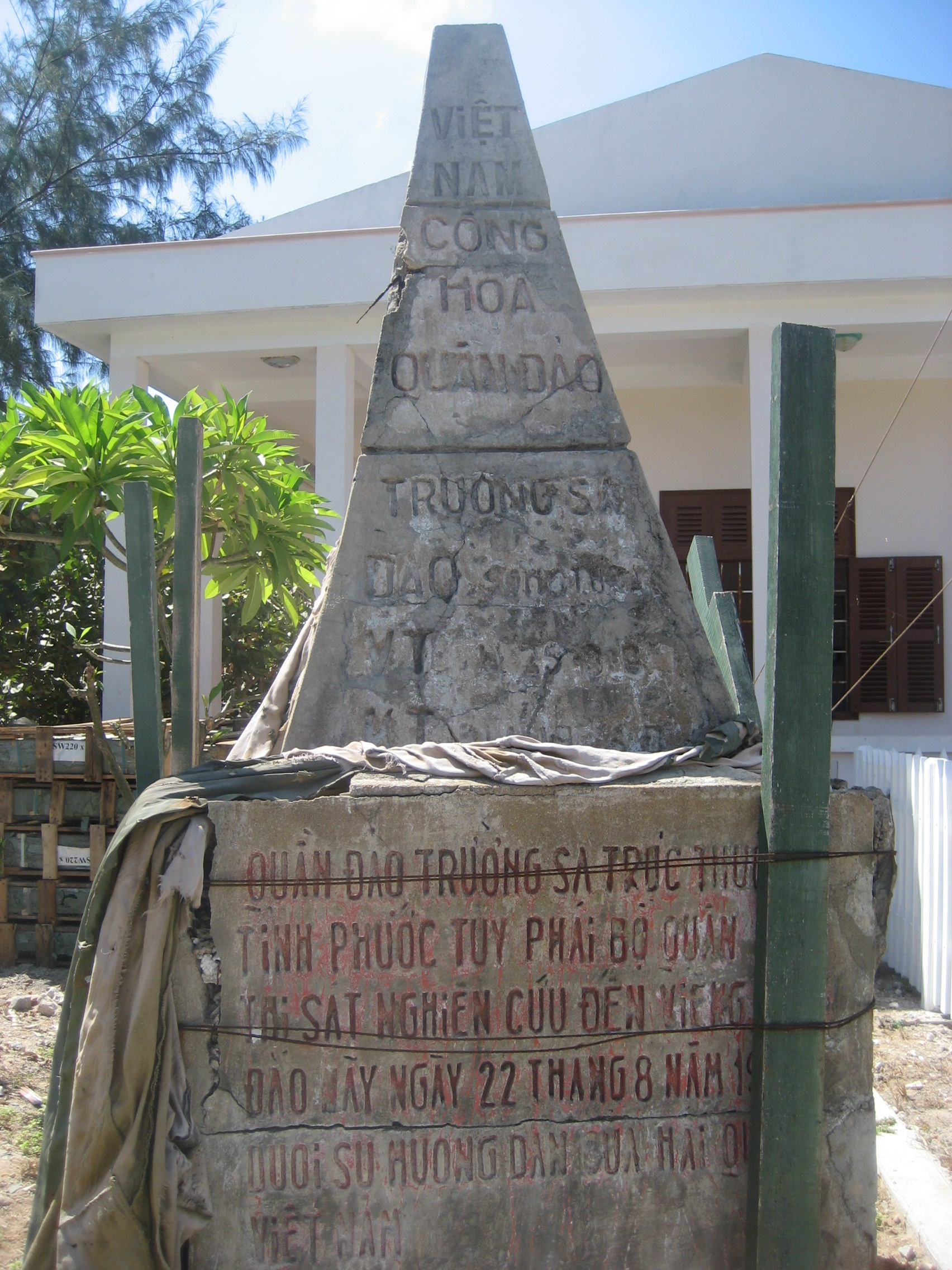
Territorial monument of the Republic of Vietnam (South Vietnam) on Southwest Cay, Spratly Islands, defining the cay as part of Vietnamese territory (to Phước Tuy Province). Used since 22 August 1956 until 1975, when replaced by another one from the Socialist Republic of Vietnam (successor)..

In 1954, the French government officially returned North Danger Reef with the entire Spratly and Paracel Islands to the Republic of Vietnam (South Vietnam).

In 1958, the Republic of Vietnam (South Vietnam) Navy built milestones of sovereignty on Southwest Cay and Northeast Cay.

In 1970, the Philippine Navy occupied Southwest Cay.

In 1975, the Republic of Vietnam (South Vietnam) Navy recaptured Southwest Cay through foul play via sending Vietnamese prostitutes for an occasion, despite being allies in the Vietnam War, to lure Philippine Navy soldiers to temporarily leave the island for Northeast Cay while in a storm. When the weather cleared, the returning soldiers were surprised to find that there was now a company of South Vietnamese soldiers on the island.

At present, Vietnamese troops are managing Southwest Cay. And the Philippines occupies Northeast Cay.

== Features ==
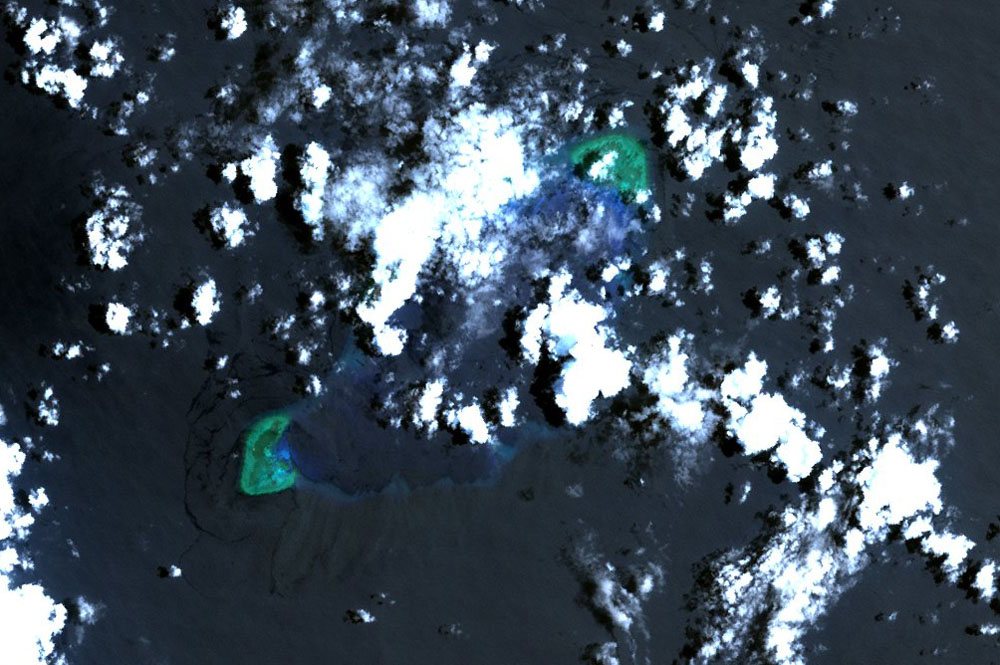
Landsat 7 image (2000)

Commencing in the NE and travelling anti-clockwise to the SW:

- North Reef (11°28′N 114°23′E)
  - North Pass
- Northeast Cay (11°27′N 114°21′E) - light on NE side
- Shira Islet
  - Middle Pass
- Southwest Cay (11°26′N 114°20′E) - marked by a light
  - West Pass - N
- Jenkins Patches
  - West Pass - S
- South Reef (11°23.3′N 114°17.9′E) - SW of the Reef
  - South Pass

Continuing anti-clockwise to the East and NE:

- Sabine Patches
- Farquharson Patches
  - East Pass
- Day Shoal - NE of reef
- Iroquois Ridge - central N of reef

== See also ==
- List of maritime features in the Spratly Islands

== Bibliography ==
- NGA Chart 93044 shows the area NW of Dangerous Ground
- NGA Chart 93042 shows the detail of North Danger Reef
