= Bureau of Fisheries and Aquatic Resources =

Philippine government agency

- Kawanihan ng Pangisdaan at Yamang-tubig
- Logo

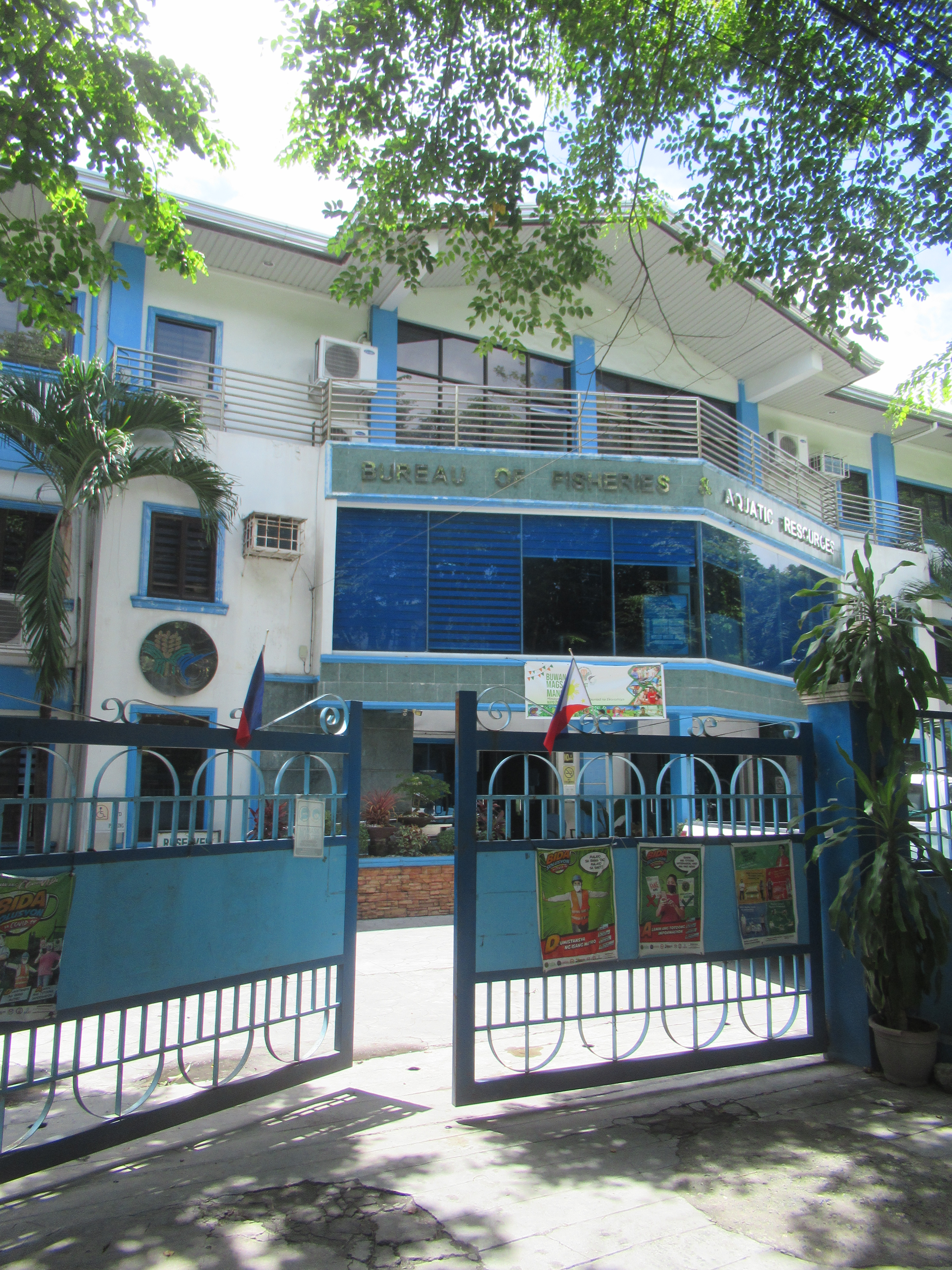

Agency overview
- Formed: May 17, 1974
- Headquarters: 3F PCA Building, Vasra, Quezon City, Philippines; 14°39′13″N 121°3′4″E
- Employees: 1,610 (2024)
- Annual budget: ₱6.11 billion (2020)
- Agency executive: Isidro M. Velayo, Jr., Officer in Charge
- Parent agency: Department of Agriculture
- Website: BFAR website

The Bureau of Fisheries and Aquatic Resources (BFAR; Filipino: Kawanihan ng Pangisdaan at Yamang-tubig) is an agency of the Philippine government under the Department of Agriculture responsible for the development, improvement, law enforcement, management and conservation of the Philippines' fisheries and aquatic resources.

== History ==
The Bureau of Fisheries and Aquatic Resources (BFAR) started as a small agency in 1901 under the name Bureau of Government Laboratories, Department of Interior of the Philippine Commission. When the Civil Government was established on July 4, 1901, the Philippine Commission proposed the creation of an office under the Department of Interior to take charge of the conservation, promotion and development of the country's fishery resources. This was not carried out, due to limited funds. The Secretary of the Interior, Dean Conant Worcester, continued to stir interest in the development of fisheries and, finally, in 1907, studies in fisheries began following the arrangement made by the Secretary of Interior for the services of the United States Fish Commission fisheries research vessel USS Albatross to work in Philippine waters for 18 months, and the employment of an American fisheries specialist in the Bureau of Science, to take charge of all work pertaining to fisheries. Considerable advances in the taxonomy of fish in the Philippines and documentation of fishing methods were made by Albert William Herre who served as the chief fishery officer in the Bureau of Science from 1919 to 1928.

On January 1, 1933, by virtue of General Memorandum Order No. 4 dated December 5, 1932, of the Secretary of Agriculture and Commerce, the Division of Fisheries and Division of Zoology of the Bureau of Science together with the Division of Forest Fauna and Grazing of the Bureau of Forestry were fused into one special division known as the Fish and Game Administration, which was placed under the direct administrative jurisdiction of the Department of Agriculture and Commerce. Under this arrangement, the Fish and Game Administration operated under the provisions of the Fisheries Act (Act No. 4003) and Act No. 2590, entitled "An Act for the Protection of Game and Fish." By subsequent reorganization effected on September 27, 1934, the Fish and Game Administration was returned to the Bureau of Science. The reason for its return was to strengthen the office through the use of equipment, personnel and appropriation of the Bureau.

On July 1, 1941, under the provisions of General Administrative Order No. 15, the Fish and Game Administration was reorganized as an independent unit under the Department of Agriculture and Commerce and renamed the Division of Fisheries. The functions pertaining to forest fauna and grazing was returned to the Bureau of Forestry and those of the Division of Zoology to the Bureau of Science.

The Divisions of Fisheries as a special division under the Department of Agriculture and Commerce functioned up to the outbreak of the war in 1941. During the early days of World War II, the Division of Fisheries was fused with the Bureau of Forestry and then known as the Bureau of Forestry and Fishery. In the latter part of Japanese occupation, however, the Division of Fisheries was converted into an independent office known as the Bureau of Fisheries.

Taking cognizance of the increasing importance of effectively administering and conserving fisheries and other aquatic resources and in efforts to rehabilitate the devastated economy brought upon by World War II, the Congress of the Philippines enacted Republic Act No. 177 creating the present Bureau of Fisheries, which took effect on July 1, 1947. The Division of Fisheries and all sections, field districts, experimental stations and all activities and agencies of the National Government connected with fishery work have been incorporated in the Bureau of Fisheries.

As organized on July 1, 1947, the Bureau of Fisheries had seven functional divisions, namely, (1) Administrative Division, (2) Division of Fish Culture and Fisheries Biology,(3) Division of Commercial Fisheries, (4) Division of Fisheries Technology, (5) Division of Licenses and Regulations, (6) Division of Investigation and Inspection, and (7) Philippine Institute of Fisheries Technology offering a 2½ year course in fisheries on collegiate level. Subsequently, branches of this Institute offering a 4-year secondary course in fisheries were established in the following seven provinces: Samar, Cebu, Albay, Iloilo, Zamboanga City, Antique and Batangas.

The entire Philippines was divided into 10 fishery districts with a District Fishery Officer as head of each District. The headquarters of the fishery districts were located in strategic places in the different fishing regions as follows; Fishery District No. 1-Aparri, Cagayan; 2-Dagupan, 3-Manila; 4-Naga City; 5-Catbalogan; 6-Iloilo City; 7-Coron, Palawan; 8-Cebu City; 9-Davao City and 10-Zamboanga City.

Under the reorganization Plan No. 30-A reorganizing the Department of Agriculture and Natural Resources as implemented by Executive Order No. 216, dated November 17, 1956, the Bureau of Fisheries was reorganized again effective January 16, 1957 such that functional divisions of the Bureau had been reduced from seven to five, namely, (1) Licenses and Regulations Divisions; (2) Marine Fisheries Division; (3) Fisheries Research Division; (4) Inland Fisheries Division; and (5) Administrative Services Division.

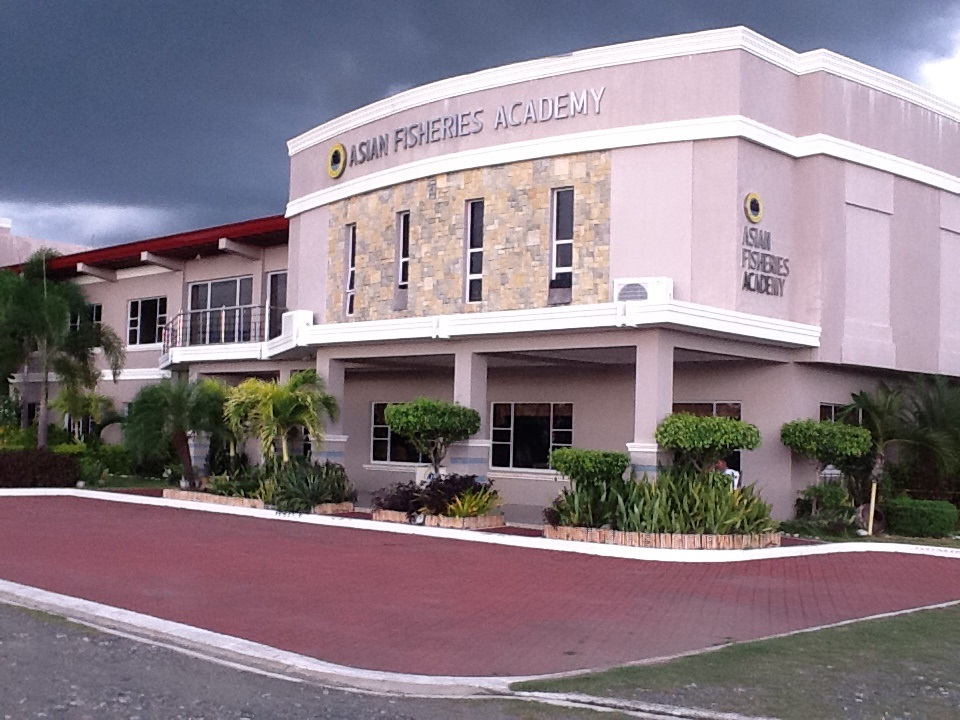
BFAR Asian Fisheries Academy at the National Fisheries Development Center, Bonuan Binloc, Dagupan – June 5, 2013

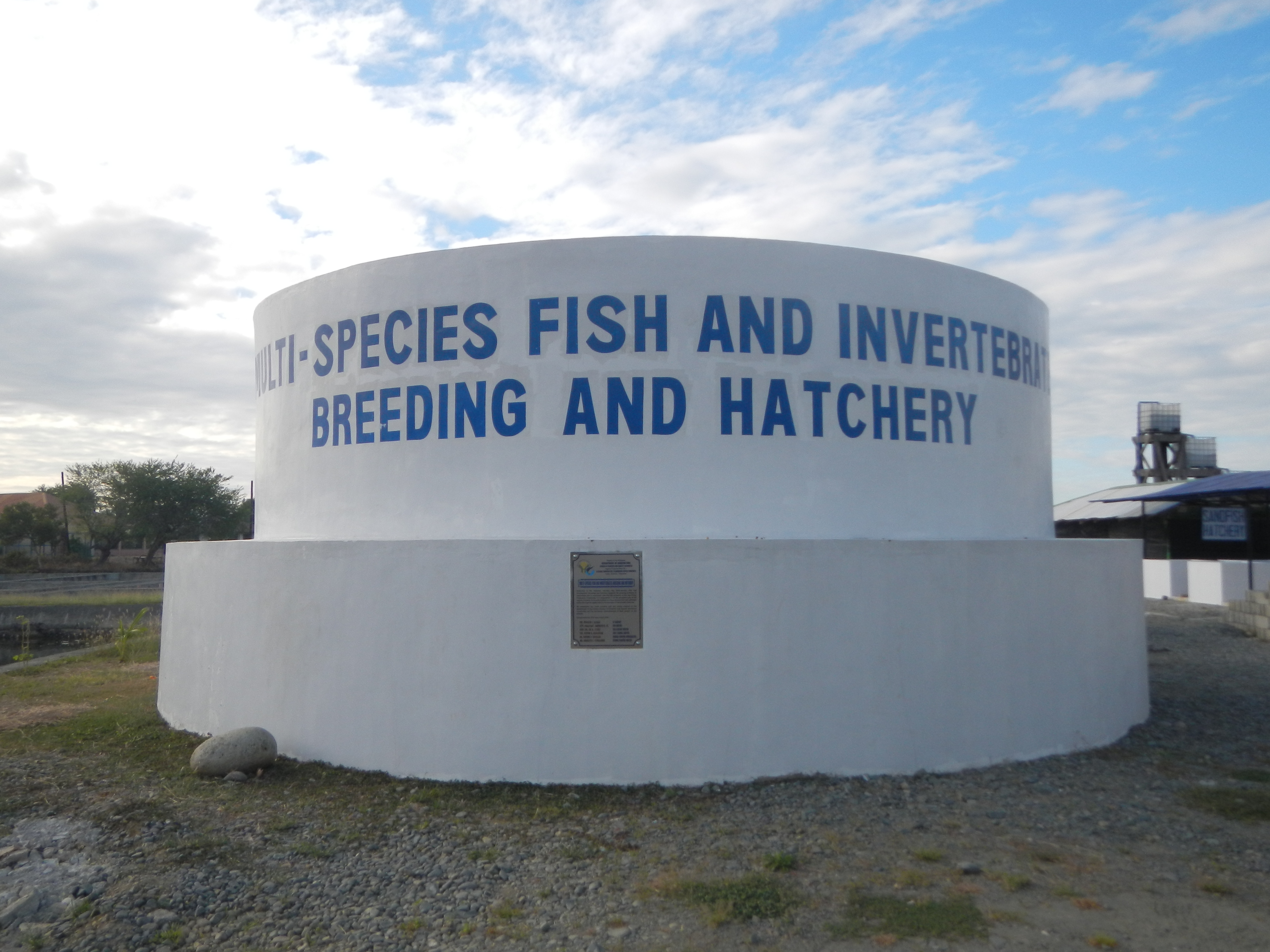
Multi-Species Fish and Invertebrate Breeding and Hatchery, (Oceanographic Marine Laboratory in Alaminos) Lucap, Alaminos, Pangasinan, Philippines, Department of Agriculture, Bureau of Fisheries and Aquatic Resources, Regional Mariculture Technodemo Center (RMaTDeC) – April 20, 2011.

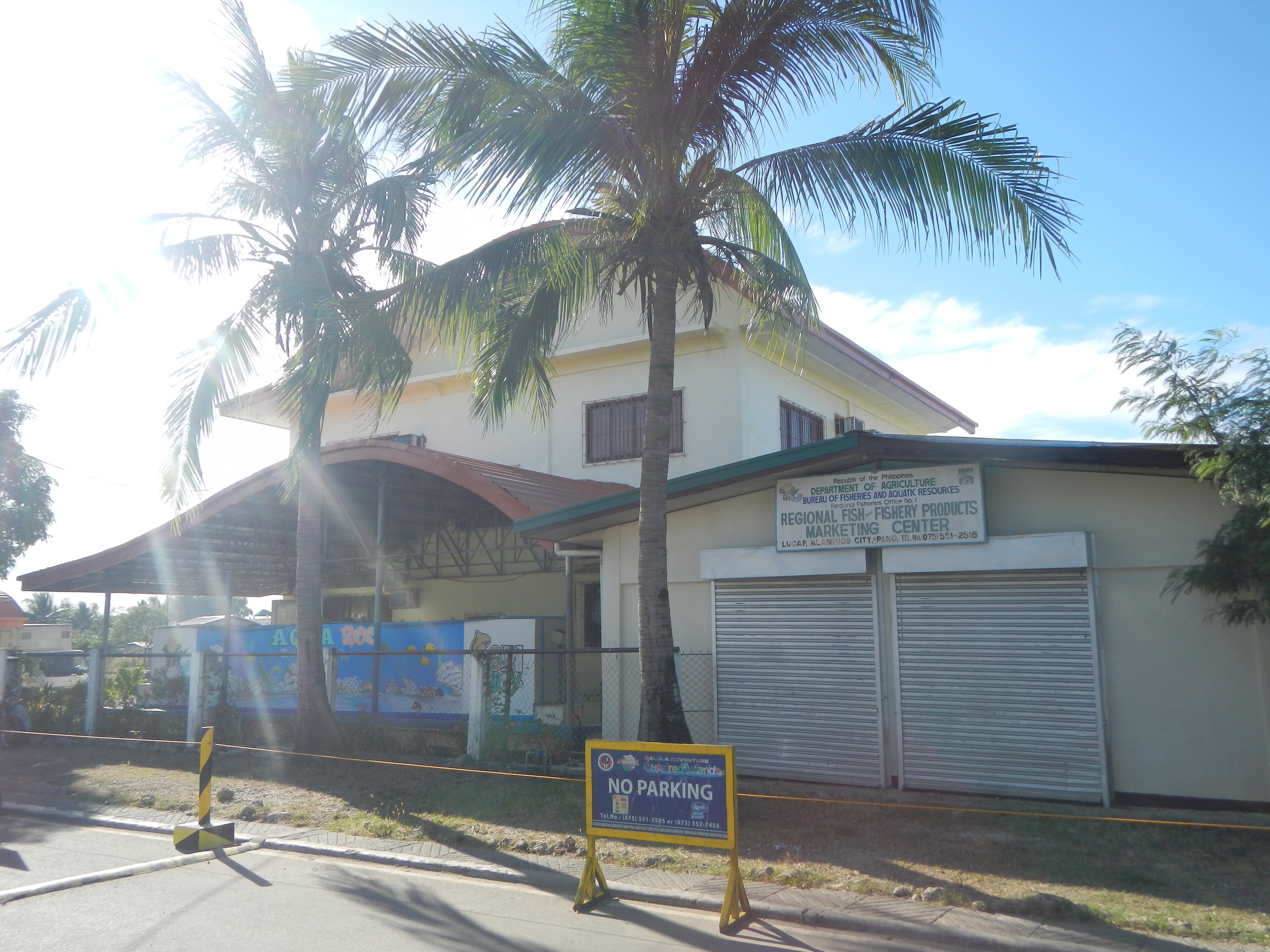
Alaminos Regional Mariculture Technodemo Center (RMaTDeC) – April 20, 2011

The Philippine Institute of Fisheries Technology had been transferred to the University of the Philippines. The seven secondary schools of fisheries in the provinces previously mentioned had been transferred to the Department of Education under the administration of the Bureau of Public Schools. On March 20, 1963, R. A. 3512 reorganized the Bureau into the Philippine Fisheries Commission. And on September 30, 1972, under the Integrated Reorganization Plan, the Philippine Fisheries Commission was reverted to the Bureau of Fisheries. By virtue of Presidential Decree No. 461 signed on May 17, 1974, which reorganized the Department of Agriculture, and the Department of Natural Resources, the Philippine Fisheries Commission was renamed Bureau of Fisheries and Aquatic Resources and placed under the Ministry of Natural Resources.

On June 30, 1984, BFAR was transferred from the Ministry of Natural Resources to the Ministry of Agriculture and Food, in compliance with Executive Order 967 mandating the conversion of BFAR as a staff Bureau and integrating its Regional Offices with the Regional Offices of the Department of Agriculture. The staff functions of the Central Office and the integration of BFAR's Regional Offices into Regional Offices of the Department of Agriculture was fully implemented with the issuance of Executive Order 116 signed by President on January 30, 1987.

On February 25, 1998 President Fidel V. Ramos signed into law Republic Act No. 8550, entitled, "An Act Providing For the Development, Management and Conservation of the Fisheries and Aquatic Resources, Integrating all laws pertinent thereto and for other purposes", otherwise known as the Philippine Fisheries Code of 1998. This law took effect on March 23, 1998.

On April 18, 2024, the Ombudsman of the Philippines Samuel Martires, in a 23-page decision dated February 5, dismissed BFAR National Director Demosthenes R. Escoto for grave misconduct, based on the complaint filed by Atty. James Victoriano, in the award of the P2.1-billion contract to SRT-United Kingdom for the purchase of 5,000 units of transmitters and transceivers for catcher’s vessels. Secretary Francisco Tiu Laurel Jr. designated Isidro M. Velayo, Jr. MDM as Officer in Charge. However, the concerned employees of the DA-BFAR express support for Escoto, who can still appeal the dismissal with the Court of Appeals.

== Current organization ==
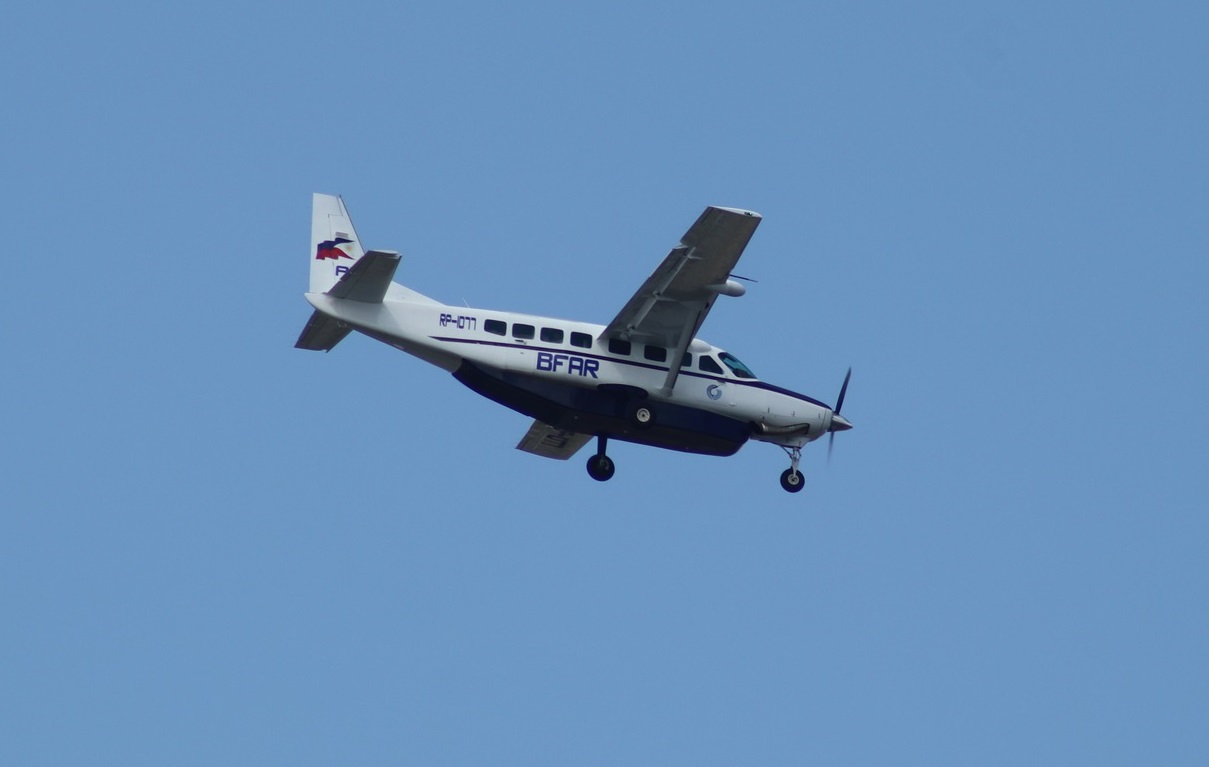
Cessna 208B Caravan Patrol Aircraft of the Philippine BFAR

After undergoing series of reorganizations, the BFAR today has nine (9) functional divisions: the Fisheries Policy Research and Economics Division, Fishery Resources Administration Division, Fisheries Development and Support Services Division, Aquaculture Division, Fisheries Resources Research Division, EEZ Fisheries and Allied Services Division, Fishing Technology Division, Fisheries Regulation and Quarantine Division, and Post Harvest Technology Division. It also has eight (8) fisheries technology center under its wing: The National Marine Fisheries Development Center, National Brackishwater Aquaculture Technology Research Center, National Freshwater Fisheries Technology Research Center, Tanay Freshwater Experimental Station, Fisheries Biological Station Complex, National Fisheries Research and Development Center, National Seaweeds Technology and Development Center and the Mindanao Freshwater Fisheries Technology Center.

=== Floating assets ===
Class	Photo	Type	Ships	Origin	Note
Search and Rescue Vessels
Lapu-Lapu-class multi-mission offshore vessel		Offshore Patrol Vessel	BRP Lapu-Lapu (MMOV-5001); BRP Francisco Dagohoy (MMOV-5002)	Philippines	Built by Josefa Slipway using a 50.5-meter long design from Incat Crowther.
Datu Cabaylo-class multi-mission offshore vessel		Offshore Patrol Vessel	BRP Datu Cabaylo (MMOV-3001); BRP Datu Sanday (MMOV-3002); BRP Datu Pagbuaya (MMOV-3003); BRP Datu Bankaw (MMOV-3004); BRP Datu Tamblot (MMOV-3005); BRP Datu Matanam Taradapit (MMOV-3006); BRP Datu Romapenet (MMOV-3007); BRP Datu Sumkad (MMOV-3008); BRP Datu Balensusa (MMOV-3009); BRP Datu Bangkaya (MMOV-3010); BRP Datu Daya (MMOV-3011); BRP Datu Gumbay Piang (MMOV-3014); BRP Datu Paduhinog (MMOV-3017) BRP Datu Sumakwel (MMOV-3019) BRP Datu Gagandilan (MMOV-3020)	Philippines	Originally, 12 ships are set to be built by Josefa Slipway using a 30-meter long design from Incat Crowther. 7 ships were completed, while 4 more ships were launched in July 2024 and 1 ship is currently under construction. Total appears to have increased to at least 17 ships based on the confirmed existence of MMOV-3017.
Rodman 101		Patrol boat	DA BFAR MCS-3001; DA BFAR MCS-3002; DA BFAR MCS-3003; DA BFAR MCS-3004; DA BFAR MCS-3005; DA BFAR MCS-3006; DA BFAR MCS-3007; DA BFAR MCS-3008; DA BFAR MCS-3009; DA BFAR MCS-3011	Spain	30-meter long patrol boats built by Rodman Polyboats of Spain. 10 delivered between 2003–2004.
Rodman 38		Patrol craft	DA BFAR MCS-1101; DA BFAR MCS-1102; DA BFAR MCS-1103; DA BFAR MCS-1104	Spain	11-meter long patrol boats built by Rodman Polyboats of Spain. 4 delivered between 2003–2004.

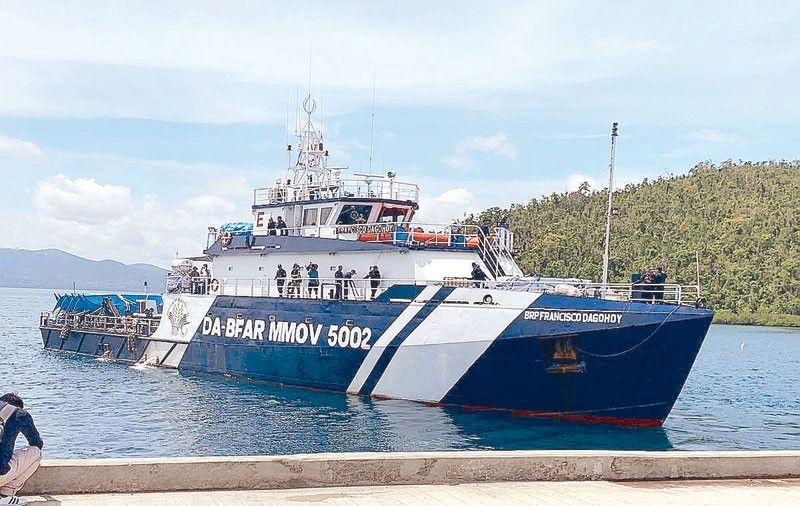
BFAR MMOV 5002 BRP FRANCISCO DAGOHOY

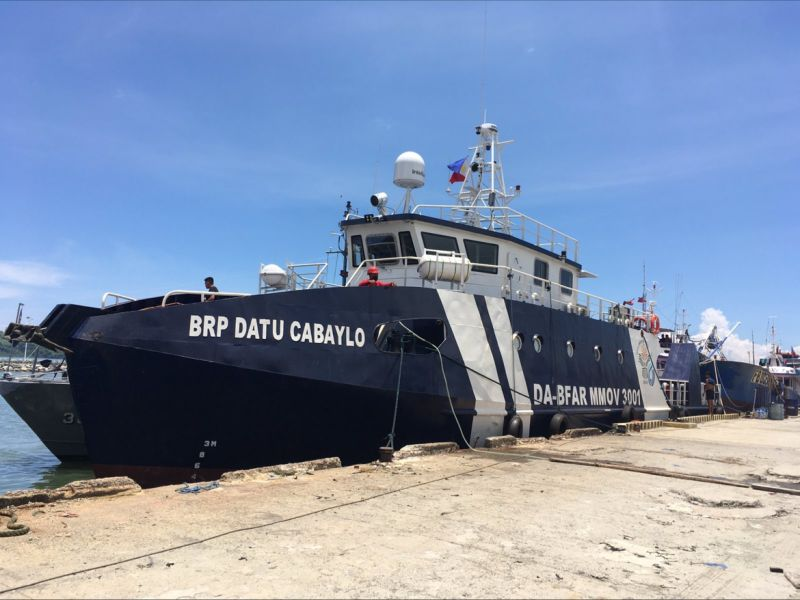
BFAR BRP DATU CABAYLO CLASS

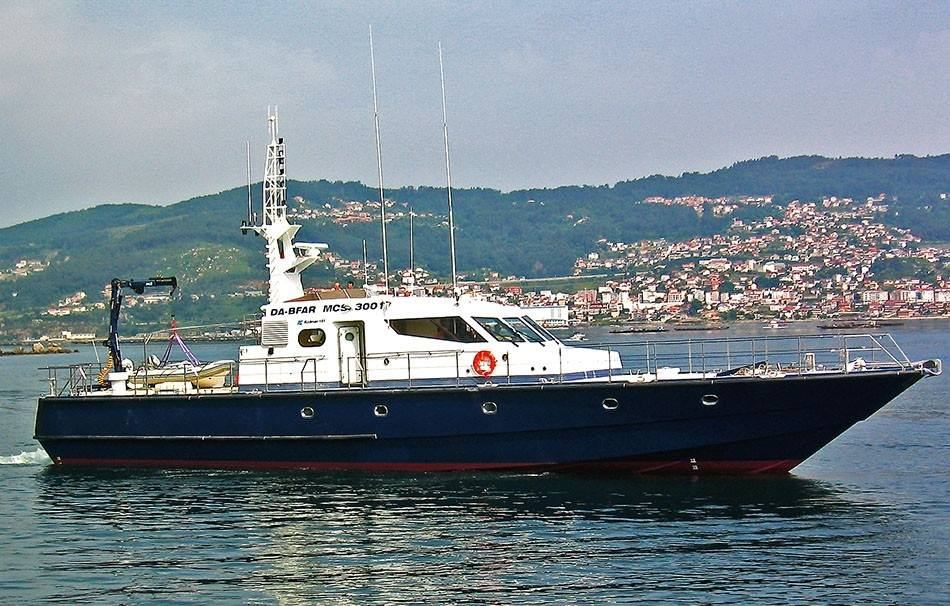
Rodman 101 DA BFAR MCS-3001
