= Josefa Slipways =

Shipbuilding company in the Philippines

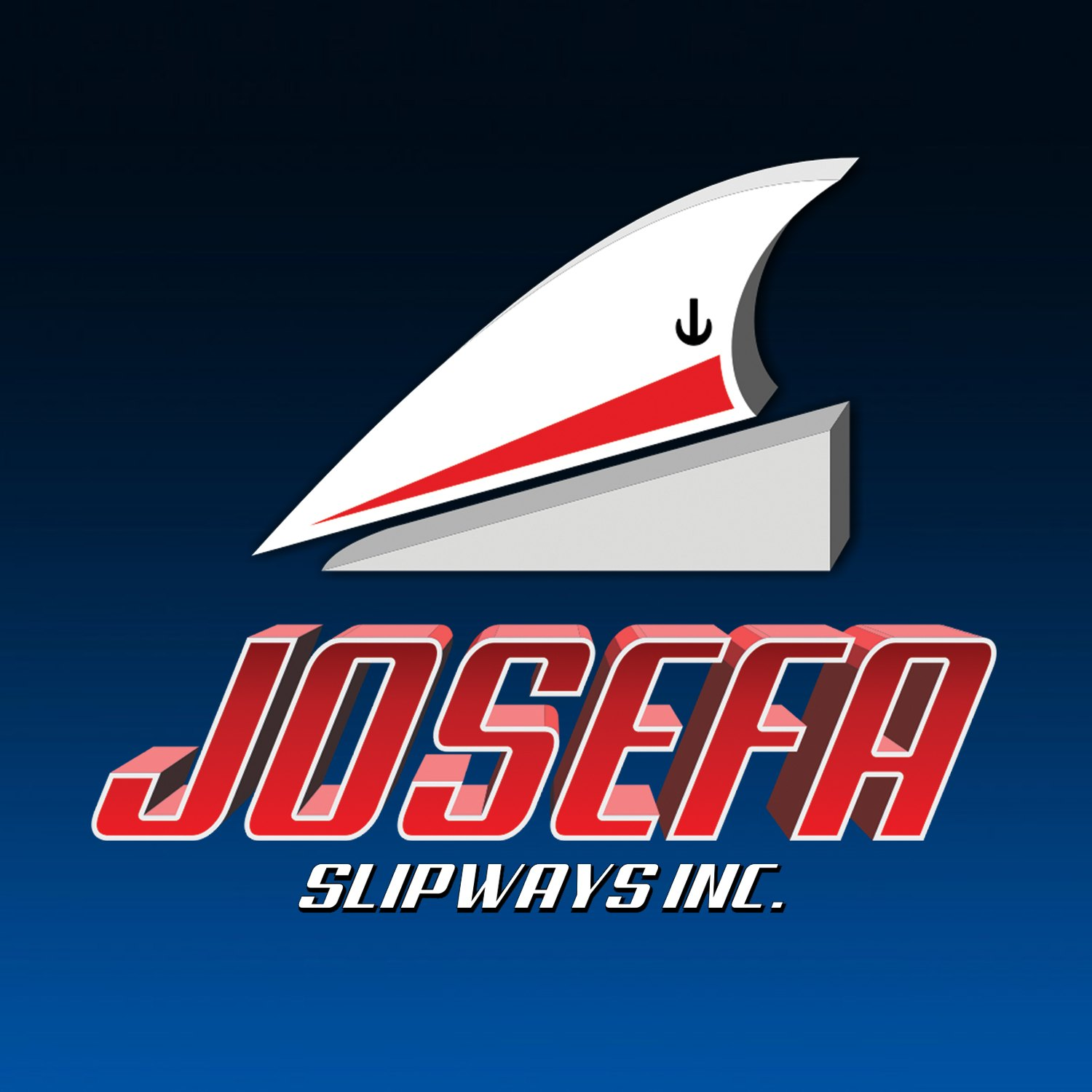
- Type: Private
- Industry: Shipbuilding
- Founded: 2005; 21 years ago in Navotas, Philippines
- Headquarters: 1326 M. Naval Street, Navotas, Philippines
- Key people: Arturo Balajadia (VP for Marketing and Operations)
- Products: Ferries, patrol vessels, cargo vessels
- Number of employees: 135 (2017)
- Website: www.josefaslipwaysinc.com

Josefa Slipways, Inc. is a medium-category shipbuilding company based in Navotas, Philippines. It was established in 2005 to provide shipbuilding and ship repair services to shipping companies and maritime government agencies in the Philippines. The company has two slipways in Navotas for docking and launching vessels as well as another facility in Sual, Pangasinan.

== History ==
Josefa Slipways was founded in 2005 in Navotas, which is known for its shipbuilding and fisheries industry. Its incorporators established the company to provide shipbuilding and ship repair facilities to passenger and freight shipping companies, fishing companies, energy and mining, companies and port construction companies operating in the Port of Manila and other ports in the Philippines. It also provides its services to civilian maritime government agencies such as the Philippine Coast Guard (PCG) and Bureau of Fisheries and Aquatic Resources (BFAR). It employed local shipbuilding veterans and owns two slipways in the city for docking and launching of vessels.

The company specializes in building landing crafts, ferries, patrol vessels, fisheries vessels and small cargo vessels. It is the first Filipino shipbuilding and ship repair company to build hulls using high-tensile steel in compliance with International Association of Classification Societies standards.

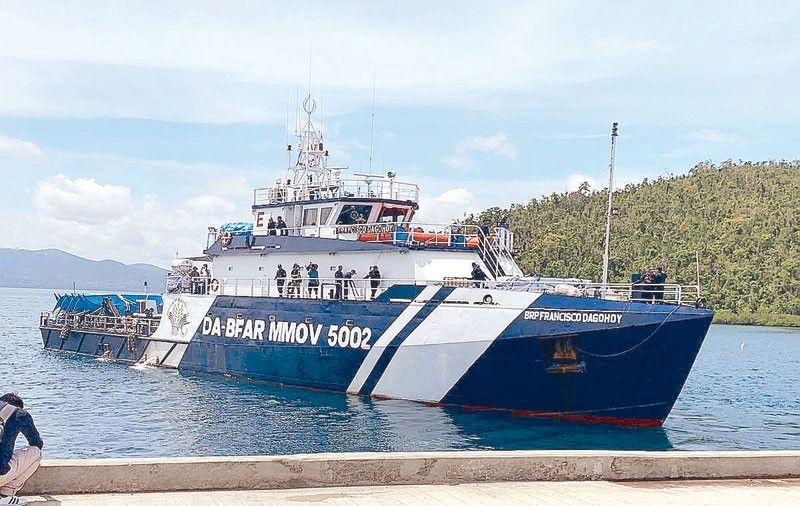
BFAR MMOV BRP LAPU-LAPU CLASS

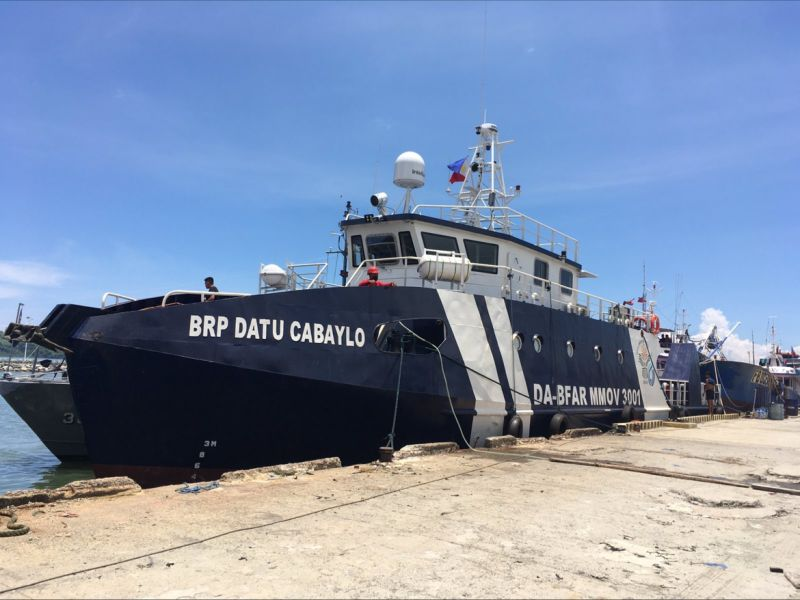
BFAR DATU Cabaylo-class

On February 17, 2016, after several stages of competitive bidding, the company was selected by the Philippine government to construct two, 50-meter, multi-mission vessels for the BFAR, which will be used for fisheries law enforcement. The company worked with Australian marine engineering and design firm Incat Crowther, which was selected to design the two vessels. It completed construction and launched the vessels, which were named BRP Lapu-Lapu and BRP Francisco Dagohoy respectively, on 11 August 2017 and delivered it to the BFAR in February 2018 following successful sea trials.

On November 18, 2017, Josefa Slipways opened a larger shipbuilding and ship repair facility in Sual, Pangasinan, where it will build 10 50-meter multi-mission vessels for the BFAR.

Josefa Slipways also constructed its first ROPAX ferry vessel, MV Isla Simara, for Filipino shipping company Shogun Ships. The 72-meter steel vessel was delivered to the customer of 17 August 2019 and will be used to transport passengers and cargo between Sorsogon and Northern Samar. It is the first RORO vessel to be built in the Philippines since the 1990s.
