= Scarborough =

Scarborough or Scarboro may refer to:

== People ==
- Scarborough (surname)
- Earl of Scarbrough

== Places ==
=== Australia ===
- Scarborough, Western Australia, suburb of Perth
- Scarborough, New South Wales, suburb of Wollongong
- Scarborough, Queensland, suburb in the Moreton Bay Region
- Electoral district of Scarborough, an electorate of the Western Australian Legislative Assembly

=== Canada ===
- Scarborough, Ontario, an administrative district and former city
  - Scarborough GO Station, a train station of GO Transit in Toronto
  - Scarborough City Centre, a neighbourhood in Toronto
  - Scarborough Town Centre, a shopping mall in Toronto
  - Scarborough Village, a neighbourhood in Toronto
- Scarborough Bluffs, a geological escarpment in Toronto
- Scarborough Formation (Ontario), a geologic formation in Ontario
- Scarboro Beach Amusement Park (1907–1925), a defunct amusement park in the Beaches neighbourhood of Toronto
- Scarboro, Calgary, a neighbourhood in Calgary, Alberta

=== United Kingdom ===
- Scarborough, North Yorkshire
  - Scarborough railway station, in Scarborough, North Yorkshire.
  - Borough of Scarborough, former local government district from 1974 to 2023
  - Scarborough (UK Parliament constituency), which existed from 1295 until 1918, and from 1974 to 1997
  - Scarborough Castle, located in North Yorkshire
- Scarborough Mere, a natural lake in the Weaponness Valley, Scarborough, England
- Scarborough Formation, a geologic formation in England

=== United States ===
- Scarboro, Georgia, an unincorporated community
- Scarborough, Maine, a town
  - Scarborough (CDP), Maine, now Oak Hill, a census-designated place in the town
- Scarborough, New York, a hamlet in Briarcliff Manor
  - Scarborough (Metro-North station), a Metro-North station serving the village
  - Scarborough Day School, a defunct private school in the hamlet
- Scarborough Beach (Rhode Island) in Narragansett, Rhode Island

==== Texas ====
- Scarborough Renaissance Festival in Waxahachie, Texas
- Lake Scarborough, a lake in Texas.

=== Elsewhere ===
- Scarborough, New Zealand, a suburb of Christchurch
- Scarborough, Cape Town, South Africa, on the west coast of the Cape Peninsula
- Scarborough Shoal, a group of islands in the South China Sea disputed by the People's Republic of China, the Republic of China and Philippines
- Scarborough, Tobago, a capital city in Trinidad and Tobago

== Ships ==
- HMS Scarborough, the name of several ships of Britain's Royal Navy
- Scarborough (East Indiaman), three ships of the British East India Company
- TTS Scarborough, a Cape-class patrol boat of the Trinidad and Tobago Coast Guard

== Sport ==
- Scarborough F.C., a football club formerly based in Scarborough, England
- Scarborough Athletic F.C., a football club created by the supporters' trust of the old club
- Scarborough Cricket Club (England), cricket club, also a home ground of Yorkshire County Cricket Club
- Scarborough Cricket Club (Australia), cricket club based in Western Australia
- Scarborough Pirates, a now defunct former professional rugby league club
- Scarborough Pirates ARLFC, a now defunct amateur rugby league club
- Scarborough RUFC, an amateur rugby union club
- Scarborough Sting, a now defunct ice hockey team based in Ontario, Canada
- Scarborough Sabres, a now defunct ice hockey team based in Canada

== Other uses ==
- The Scarborough News, a local newspaper for Scarborough, England
- Scarborough (2018 film), a 2018 film set in Scarborough, North Yorkshire
- Scarborough (2021 film), a 2021 Canadian drama film directed by Shasha Nakhai and Rich Williamson
- Scarborough Van Assembly, a former General Motors Assembly plant in Ontario, Canada
- Scarborough Raid, an attack on the town of Scarborough, North Yorkshire by the Imperial German Navy
- Scarborough Research, a company researching consumer media habits, a joint venture between Nielsen Company and Arbitron
- Scarbrough Stakes, a horse race, held at Doncaster Racecourse
- Scarborough (TV series) a 2019 BBC comedy series
- Line 3 Scarborough (formerly called the Scarborough RT) a defunct Toronto transit line in Scarborough, Ontario
- University of Toronto Scarborough, a University of Toronto campus in Scarborough, Ontario

== See also ==
- Scarborough Centre (disambiguation)
- Scarborough Fair (disambiguation)
- Scarborough North (disambiguation)
- Scarborough station (disambiguation)
- Scarbrough, a surname
- Skaraborg (disambiguation)
