= Scarborough (East Indiaman) =

Three vessels with the name Scarborough have served the British East India Company (EIC).

- Scarborough (1734 EIC ship) was launched December 1734 and made two voyages for the EIC. The Royal Navy purchased her on 21 November 1739 to use as a storeship, but then used her as a hospital ship instead. The Navy sold her on 18 December 1744.
- Scarborough (1740 EIC ship), launched c.1740, made four voyages for the EIC and gave her name to Scarborough Shoal after grounding there in 1748.
- Scarborough (1782 ship), launched in 1782, carried convicts on the First Fleet to New South Wales, carried a cargo for the EIC from China back to Britain, and again carried convicts on the Second Fleet. Scarborough then made one more trip for the EIC between 1801 and 1802.
