= Cuarteron =

Cuarteron may refer to:

- Quadroon
- Cuarteron Reef
