= List of stadiums in England =

This is a list of sports stadiums in England, ranked in descending order of capacity. All stadiums in England with a capacity of 10,000 or more are included.

Only stadiums within the territory of England are included; thus the home stadiums of the six Welsh football clubs playing in the English football league system are not listed here.

== Current stadiums ==
Image	Stadium	Location	Current capacity with expansion limit	Sport	Occupant	Notes
	Wembley Stadium	Wembley, London	90,000	Football	National football team	De facto home of the England national football team and used for club football cup and play-off finals. Also used for the Rugby league Challenge Cup Final and American football with National Football League matches being held annually.
	Old Trafford	Old Trafford, Greater Manchester	74,994 (88,000)	Football	Manchester United	Since 1998 has been used to host Rugby league's Super League Grand Final. Also used for some Rugby league Internationals and one Rugby league World Club Challenge.
	Twickenham Stadium	Twickenham, London	82,000	Rugby union	National Rugby union team	Whilst the new Wembley Stadium was being built, Twickenham hosted some Rugby league Internationals and the Rugby league Challenge Cup Final twice.
	London Stadium	Stratford, London	66,000	Athletics, Football	West Ham United	Built for the London 2012 Olympics and Paralympics. Refitted for football and athletics.
	Stadium of Light	Sunderland	49,000 (65,000)	Football	Sunderland	
	Etihad Stadium	Manchester, Greater Manchester	55,097 (63,000)	Football	Manchester City	Formerly known as City of Manchester Stadium. Hosted the 2002 Commonwealth Games and 2008 UEFA Cup Final.
	Tottenham Hotspur Stadium	Tottenham, London	62,303	Football	Tottenham Hotspur	The stadium was completed and opened on 3 April 2019
	Anfield	Liverpool	60,725	Football	Liverpool	In 1991, held the Rugby league World Club Challenge match between Wigan and Penrith.
	Emirates Stadium	Holloway, London	60,260	Football	Arsenal	Without the naming rights, the stadium is known as Ashburton Grove, or simply Arsenal Stadium. Of note, UEFA international competitions do not use the commercial names of stadiums.
	Goodison Park	Liverpool	40,170 (will be replaced with 52,888-seat stadium)	Football	Everton	The only club ground in England to have hosted a World Cup Semi-Final. The first club to host a FA Cup Final.
	St. James' Park	Newcastle upon Tyne	52,387 (65,000)	Football	Newcastle United	Hosted several Euro 1996 games and games for the football tournament at the London 2012 Olympics.
	Elland Road	Leeds	39,460 (51,000)	Football	Leeds United	Was originally the home ground of Holbeck Rugby league Club and also hosts Rugby league Internationals as well as World Club Challenge (and other) matches for Leeds Rhinos. For a number of years the home ground of Hunslet Rugby League Club. Location for Rugby League Challenge Cup Final replays and RFL Yorkshire Cup finals.
	Villa Park	Aston, Birmingham	42,788 (50,000)	Football	Aston Villa	
	St Mary's Stadium	Southampton	32,689 (50,000 planned)	Football	Southampton	
	Molineux	Wolverhampton	31,700 (50,000 planned)	Football	Wolverhampton Wanderers	
	Hillsborough Stadium	Sheffield	39,732 (45,000)	Football	Sheffield Wednesday	Euro 1996 group stage venue.
	Stamford Bridge	Fulham, London	42,449	Football	Chelsea	
	Riverside Stadium	Middlesbrough	35,100 (42,000)	Football	Middlesbrough	
	Bramall Lane	Sheffield	33,000 (40,000 seat expansion going to build)	Football	Sheffield United	
	King Power Stadium	Leicester	32,312 (40,000 planned)	Football	Leicester City	Has hosted some of Leicester Tigers major games including their major Heineken Cup Matches and Premiership play-offs games.
	Ewood Park	Blackburn	31,367 (40,000 expansion renovation structurally possible)	Football	Blackburn Rovers	Has hosted Rugby league Internationals.
	City Ground	Nottingham	30,602 (38,000 planned)	Football	Nottingham Forest	
	Selhurst Park	Selhurst, London	26,225 (34,000 to expand)	Football	Crystal Palace	
	Pride Park Stadium	Derby	33,597	Football	Derby County	
	Ricoh Arena	Coventry	32,609	Football & Rugby Union	Coventry City & Wasps RFC	
	Alexander Stadium	Birmingham	32,000	Athletics	Birchfield Harriers	
	Falmer Stadium	Brighton	30,750	Football	Brighton and Hove Albion	
	Stadium MK	Milton Keynes	30,500	Football	Milton Keynes Dons	
	St Andrew's	Birmingham	30,016	Football	Birmingham City	
	Lord's Cricket Ground	St John's Wood, London	30,000	Cricket	Middlesex CCC	A major redevelopment has been proposed for Lord's which would increase capacity by another 10,000 as well as adding apartments and an ice rink.
	Craven Cottage	Fulham, London	26,000 (30,000 to expand)	Football	Fulham	Original home ground of Fulham RL club.
	Portman Road	Ipswich	29,673	Football	Ipswich Town	
	University of Bolton Stadium	Bolton	28,723	Football	Bolton Wanderers	
	Bet365 Stadium	Stoke	28,384	Football	Stoke City	
	The Hawthorns	West Bromwich	27,877	Football	West Bromwich Albion	
	Carrow Road	Norwich	27,359	Football	Norwich City	
	The Valley	Charlton, London	27,111	Football	Charlton Athletic	Has been a home ground for London Broncos.
	Ashton Gate	Bristol	27,000	Football and Rugby Union	Bristol City & Bristol Bears	Construction for Bristol City's £40m redevelopment of Ashton Gate was completed in September 2016.
	Odsal Stadium	Bradford	26,019	Rugby league	Bradford Bulls	Was a home for Bradford City whilst Valley Parade was being rebuilt.
	The Oval	Kennington, London	25,500	Cricket	Surrey CCC	
	KC Stadium	Kingston upon Hull	25,404 (plans to expand 32,000)	Football & Rugby league	Hull City AFC & Hull	
	The Darlington Arena	Darlington	25,294	Rugby Union	Darlington Mowden Park RFC	
	DW Stadium	Wigan	25,138	Football & Rugby league	Wigan Athletic & Wigan Warriors	
	Valley Parade	Bradford	25,136	Football	Bradford City	Was the home ground of Bradford Bulls Rugby league club while Odsal Stadium was being redeveloped.
	Edgbaston Cricket Ground	Birmingham	25,000	Cricket	Warwickshire CCC	
	John Smiths Stadium	Huddersfield	24,554	Football & Rugby league	Huddersfield Town & Huddersfield Giants RLFC	
	Madejski Stadium	Reading	24,161	Football & Rugby union	Reading	
	Welford Road	Leicester	26,000	Rugby union	Leicester Tigers	Expanding to 30,000 seats due to increased supporter demand.
	Deepdale	Preston	23,408	Football	Preston North End	The oldest continunally used football stadium in the world, in use since 21 January 1875. Lancashire Lynx Rugby league club also used the ground as their home.
	Oakwell Stadium	Barnsley	23,009	Football	Barnsley	
	Turf Moor	Burnley	22,619	Football	Burnley	
	Headingley	Leeds	22,250	Rugby league & Rugby union	Leeds Rhinos & Yorkshire Carnegie	
	Old Trafford	Old Trafford, Greater Manchester	22,000	Cricket	Lancashire CCC	
	Rose Bowl	Southampton	22,000	Cricket	Hampshire	Has a standard capacity of 6,500, but uses temporary seating to give a capacity of 22,000 for international matches.
	Vicarage Road	Watford	22,000	Football	Watford	Has played host to Rugby league Internationals and Saracens FC before February 2013.
	Vale Park	Burslem	20,552	Football	Port Vale	
	Meadow Lane	Nottingham	20,438	Football & Rugby union	Notts County & Nottingham RFC	
	Fratton Park	Portsmouth	20,288	Football	Portsmouth	
	The Den	Bermondsey, London	20,146	Football	Millwall	
	Crystal Palace NSC	Crystal Palace, London	20,000	Athletics	Has been a host to London Crusaders Rugby league club.	
	Home Park	Plymouth	19,500	Football	Plymouth Argyle	
	Loftus Road	Shepherd's Bush, London	19,148	Football	Queens Park Rangers	Has played host to Rugby league Internationals.
	Headingley	Leeds	18,350	Cricket	Yorkshire CCC	
	Langtree Park	St. Helens	18,000	Rugby league	St Helens R.F.C.	
	Brentford Community Stadium	London	17,250	Football and Rugby Union	London Irish and Brentford FC	
	Riverside Ground	Chester-le-Street	17,000	Cricket	Durham CCC	
	Brunton Park	Carlisle	16,981	Football	Carlisle United	Was also the original home ground of Carlisle RLFC in the 1980s.
	Prenton Park	Birkenhead	16,567	Football	Tranmere Rovers	
	Kingsholm Stadium	Gloucester	16,500	Rugby union	Gloucester Rugby	
	Bloomfield Road	Blackpool	16,116	Football	Blackpool F.C.	Plays host the Northern Rail Rugby league Cup Final.
	County Ground	Swindon	15,728	Football	Swindon Town	
	Trent Bridge	Nottingham	15,358	Cricket	Nottinghamshire CCC	
	Keepmoat Stadium	Doncaster	15,231	Football & Rugby league	Doncaster Rovers & Doncaster	
	Halliwell Jones Stadium	Warrington	15,200	Rugby league	Warrington Wolves	
	London Road	Peterborough	15,152	Football	Peterborough United	
	St Lawrence Ground	Canterbury	15,000	Cricket	Kent CCC	One of two cricket grounds that have a tree within the boundary.
	County Cricket Ground	Bristol	15,000	Cricket	Gloucestershire CCC	
	Centre Court, Wimbledon	Wimbledon, London	15,000	Tennis		
	The Shay	Halifax	14,000	Football & Rugby league	FC Halifax Town & Halifax Panthers	Largest non-league football stadium.
	Boundary Park	Oldham	13,624	Football & Rugby league	Oldham Athletic & Oldham R.L.F.C.	
	Franklin's Gardens	Northampton	15,600	Rugby union	Northampton Saints	plans to expand stadium to 17300.
	Stobart Stadium Halton	Widnes	13,350	Rugby league	Widnes Vikings	
	Sandy Park	Exeter	16,000	Rugby union	Exeter Chiefs	There are plans to expand the stadium's capacity to perhaps 20,000 if Exeter establish themselves as a top-flight side.
	Griffin Park	Brentford, London	12,763	Football	Brentford	Has been the home ground for London Broncos Rugby league club (2002–2006).
	Twickenham Stoop	Twickenham, London	14,000	Rugby union & League	Harlequins & Harlequin R.F.L.	
	Kassam Stadium	Oxford	12,500	Football	Oxford United.	
	Craven Park	Kingston upon Hull	12,500	Rugby league	Hull Kingston Rovers	
	Roots Hall	Southend	12,392	Football	Southend United	Was also home ground for Southend Invicta Rugby league club.
	Recreation Ground	Bath	14,300	Rugby union & Cricket	Bath Rugby & Somerset CCC.	
	Memorial Stadium	Bristol	12,100	Football	Bristol Rovers	
	Sixways Stadium	Worcester	12,068	Rugby union	Worcester Warriors	
	Belle Vue	Wakefield	12,000	Rugby league	Wakefield Trinity Wildcats	Was also home to Wakefield and Emley between 2007 and 2009.
	New York Stadium	Rotherham	12,000	Football	Rotherham United	
	Salford City Stadium	Salford	12,000	Rugby league	Sale Sharks & Salford City Reds	
	Gigg Lane	Bury	11,840	Football	Bury & FC United	Was home to Swinton Lions (1992–2002).
	Gateshead International Stadium	Gateshead	11,800	Athletics, Football & Rugby league	Gateshead FC, Gateshead Thunder (1999) & Gateshead Thunder	
	The Jungle	Castleford	11,750	Rugby league	Castleford Tigers	
Peasholm Park End	North Marine Road	Scarbrough	11,500	Cricket	Yorkshire CCC Scarborough CC	
	Bescot Stadium	Walsall	11,500	Football	Walsall	
	No. 1 Court, Wimbledon	Wimbledon, London	11,429	Tennis		
	Priestfield Stadium	Gillingham	10,952	Football	Gillingham	
	Edgeley Park	Edgeley, Stockport	10,832	Football & Rugby union	Stockport County & Sale Sharks.	
	Derwent Park	Workington	10,500	Rugby league & Speedway	Workington Town & Workington Comets	
	Proact Stadium	Chesterfield	10,379	Football	Chesterfield Football Club	
	Vitality Stadium	Bournemouth	10,375	Football	AFC Bournemouth	
	Kenilworth Road	Luton	10,226	Football	Luton Town	
	Spotland	Rochdale	10,208	Football	Rochdale	
	Kingston Park	Newcastle-upon-Tyne	10,200	Rugby union	Newcastle Falcons	
	Alexandra Stadium	Crewe	10,153	Football	Crewe Alexandra	
	Sincil Bank	Lincoln	10,127	Football	Lincoln City	
	Colchester Community Stadium	Colchester	10,105	Football	Colchester United	
	Blundell Park	Cleethorpes	10,033	Football	Grimsby Town	
	Adams Park	High Wycombe	10,000	Football	Wycombe Wanderers	
	Allianz Park	Hendon, London	10,000 (to be expanded to 10,500)	Rugby Union	Saracens FC	Capacity reduced to 8,500 for 2019/20 season, while new West Stand is built
	Queen's Club	London	10,000	Tennis	Queen's Club Championships	
	County Cricket Ground	Beckenham	10,000	Cricket	Kent CCC	

== Former stadiums ==
Following crowd troubles in the 1980s, and regulations imposed after the Taylor Report, several English football league stadiums have been built or completely redeveloped in the last few years. Prior to 1988, however, the last newly built Football League ground in England & Wales was Roots Hall, Southend, which was opened in 1955.Next was in 1989.

== Future stadiums ==
Stadiums which are currently in development, and are likely to open in the near future, include:

Stadium	Location	Capacity	Sport	Occupant	Notes
New Trafford Stadium	Trafford, Manchester	100,000	Football	Manchester United	In planning stage
New Birmingham City Stadium	Bordesley Green, Birmingham	62,000	Football	Birmingham City	In planning stage
Stamford Bridge	Fulham, London	60,000	Football	Chelsea	In planning stage
Crystal Palace Park	Crystal Palace, London	40,000	Football	Crystal Palace	In planning stage
Power Court Stadium	Luton, Bedfordshire	25,000	Football	Luton Town	Under construction
New Oxford United Stadium	Kidlington, Oxfordshire	16,000	Football	Oxford United	In planning stage
Five Towns Stadium	Castleford, West Yorkshire	13,300	Rugby league	Castleford Tigers	In planning stage
Stadium for Cornwall	Threemilestone, Cornwall	10,000	Rugby union, Football	Cornish Pirates, Truro City	In planning stage

== See also ==
- List of stadiums in the United Kingdom by capacity
- List of football stadiums in England
- List of cricket grounds in England and Wales
- List of English rugby league stadiums by capacity
- Ground developments to football stadiums in the English football league system
- List of European stadiums by capacity
- Lists of stadiums
