= East London Reef =

Island

Disputed atoll
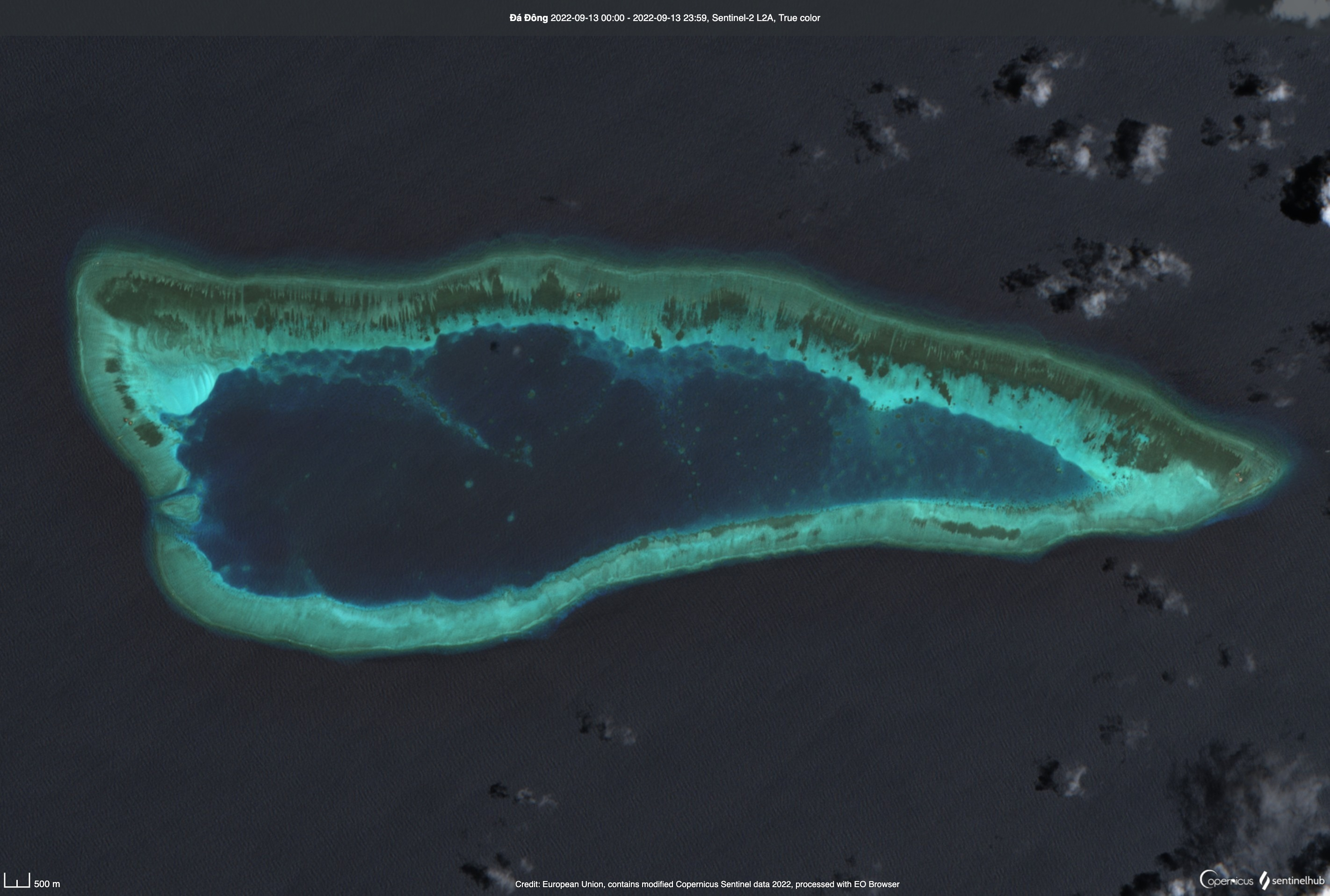
- East London Reef

- Location within Spratly Islands
- Other names: Đá Đông (Vietnamese); East Quezon Reef(Philippine English); Bahura ng Silangang Quezon (Filipino) 东礁 Dōng jiāo (Chinese)

Geography
- Location: South China Sea
- Coordinates: 8°49′42″N 112°35′48″E
- Archipelago: Spratly Islands
- Total islands: 3 (Da Dong A, B, C Islets)

Administration
- Vietnam
- District: Trường Sa District
- Township: Trường Sa Township

Claimed by
- China
- Philippines
- Taiwan
- Vietnam

East London Reef (Filipino: Bahura ng Silangang Quezon); East Reef (Vietnamese: Đá Đông); Mandarin Chinese: 东礁; pinyin: Dōng jiāo, is a atoll on the eastern part of the London Reefs of the Spratly Islands in the South China Sea. The atoll has been occupied by Vietnam since 1987. It is also claimed by China (PRC), the Philippines, Vietnam, and Taiwan (ROC).

== Characteristic ==
The East Reef is located on an east-west axis with a length of about 14 kilometres (8.7 mi) and a maximum width of about 4 kilometres (2.5 mi) with a coral base area of about 25.1 square kilometres (9.7 sq mi). Because this rock slopes gradually from south to north, when the tide is at 0.4 metres (1 ft 4 in) low, the northern coral belt rises out of the water while the southern rim only rises 0.2 metres (7.9 in) at low tide. The lagoon of this atoll is from 7.3 to 14.6 metres (24 to 48 ft) deep.

The Vietnam Navy Engineers built three permanent houses on the west, north and east sides of the atoll, named Da Dong Islets (A, B, C). The specific geographical coordinates are (coordinates in brackets are the coordinates recorded on the sovereignty landmark):

- Da Dong A Islets: 8°49′21″N 112°39′33″E (8°49′21″N 112°39′33″E), on the east side of East Reef, includes a permanent house connected to a multi-purpose cultural house (inaugurated April 2021).
- Da Dong B Islets: 8°49′40″N 112°33′01″E (8°49′04″N 112°33′05″E), on the west side of East Reef, consists of two permanent houses connected to each other.
- Da Dong C Islets: 8°50′24″N 112°35′40″E (8°50′00″N 112°34′30″E), on the north side of East Reef, includes a permanent house. The multi-purpose cultural house will start construction in April 2022.

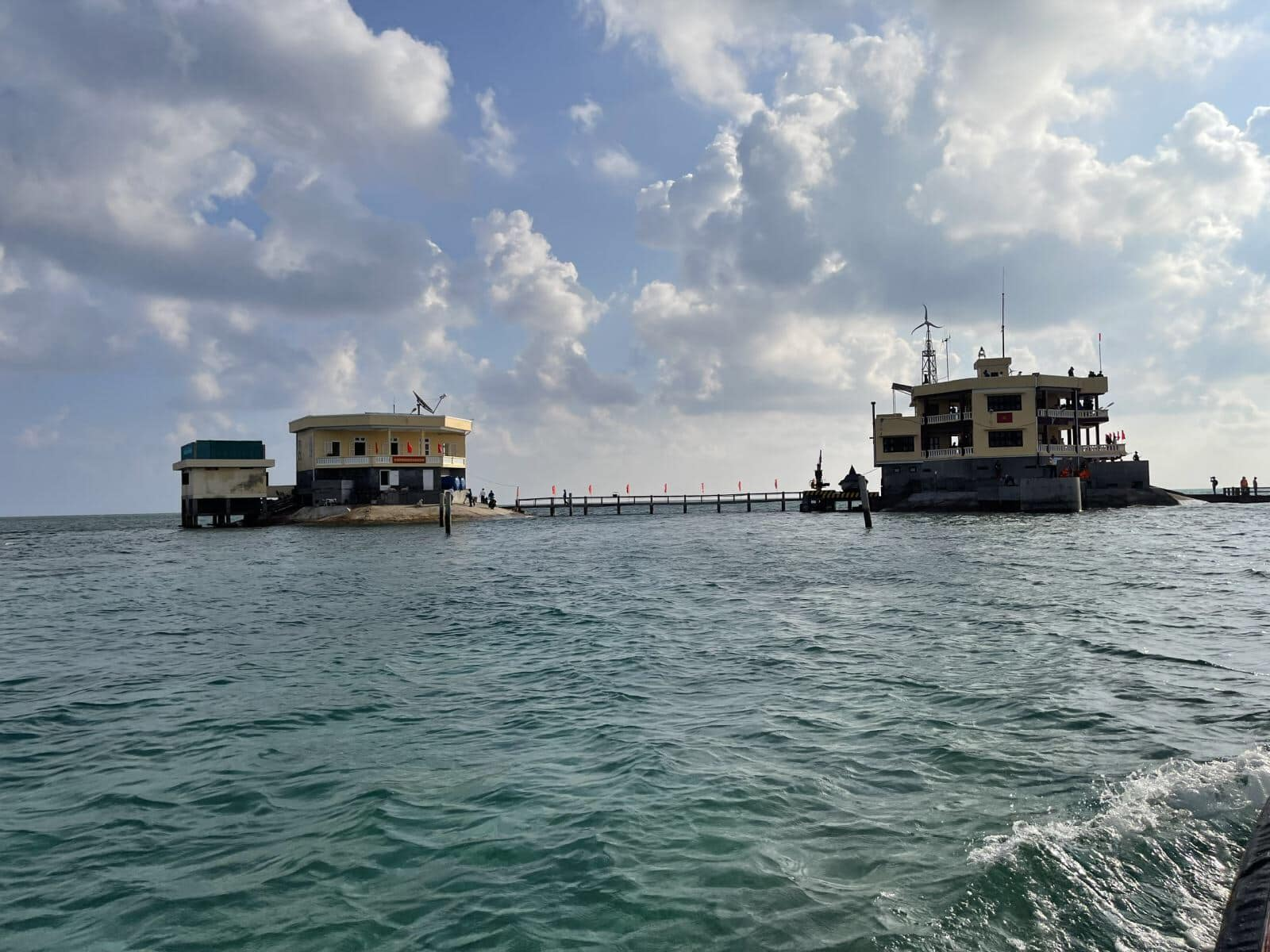
Da Dong B Islets

== History ==
In early 1988, after occupying Fiery Cross Reef (January 31, 1988) and Cuarteron Reef (February 18, 1988) in the Spratly Islands, China intended to occupy East London Reef.

On February 15, 1988, the transport ship HQ-614 of Navy Region 4 arrived at East London Reef, combined with ship HQ-851 to form a squadron because the forward command post of Region 4 was located on ship HQ-614 direct command. The forward command post of Region 4 includes Colonel, regional commander Lê Văn Thư, Lieutenant Colonel, Deputy Chief of Staff of the region Nguyễn Văn Dân and Lieutenant Colonel, Deputy Political Director of the Region Lê Xuân Bạ to organize guarding of East London Reef.

On February 19, 1988, after an unsuccessful struggle around Cuarteron Reef with China, ships HQ-614 and HQ-851 brought forces from Brigade 146, Region 4 of the Vietnamese Navy and from the 83rd Infantry Regiment. Navy troops landed on East London Reef and organized to guard this rock.

== See also ==
- Spratly Islands dispute
