= Northampton (1740 EIC ship) =

History

East India Company Ensign
- Name: Princess Royal
- Owner: Francis Salvador
- Builder: Perry, Blackwall
- Launched: November 1740
- Renamed: Northampton before launch
- Fate: Foundered 1744

General characteristics
- Tons burthen: 498, (Note: This tonnage is deliberately understated. Following Queen Anne's charter of 1702, between 1708 and 1747 almost every EIC vessel was registered as being of under 500 tons (bm). The reason was that the charter required every vessel of 500 tons or over to carry a chaplain. Apparently the Directors of the EIC did not feel this was a worthwhile expense.) or 675 (bm)
- Propulsion: Sail
- Complement: 99
- Armament: 30 guns

Northampton was launched in 1740 as an East Indiaman and made one voyage in 1741 for the British East India Company (EIC). She was on a second voyage in 1744 when she foundered. For both voyages she was under the command of Captain Duncomb Backwell.

== Voyage 1 (1741-42) ==
Northampton left the Downs on 12 March 1741, bound for China. She arrived at Whampoa on 12 August. On the return leg of her voyage she traversed the Bocca Tigris on 31 December, reached the Cape on 13 April 1742, and St Helena on 25 May. The Indiamen Northampton, Queen Caroline, Halifax, Royal George, Kent, Scarborough, and snow Swift left St Helena on 26 June, together with their escorts, HMS Argyll and HMS Lynn. They arrived safe off of Dover on 16 September. Northampton arrived at Woolwich on 3 October.

== Voyage 2 and loss ==
Northampton left the Nore on 20 July 1744, bound for Bombay and China. She was in company with Hardwick, but they parted during a violent storm about 50 leagues east of Bourbon. Northampton was not heard of again.
