= London Reefs =

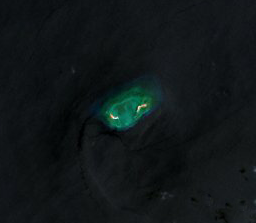
Central London Reef

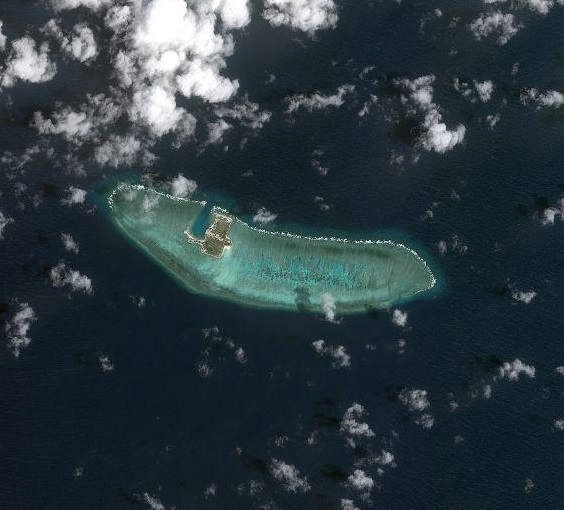
Cuarteron Reef

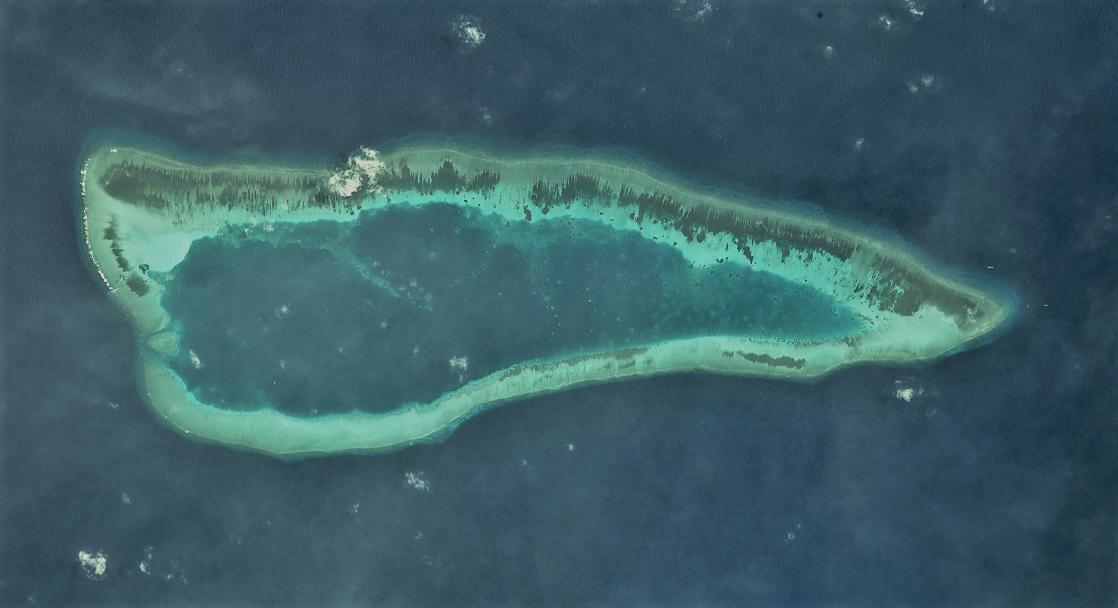
East London Reef

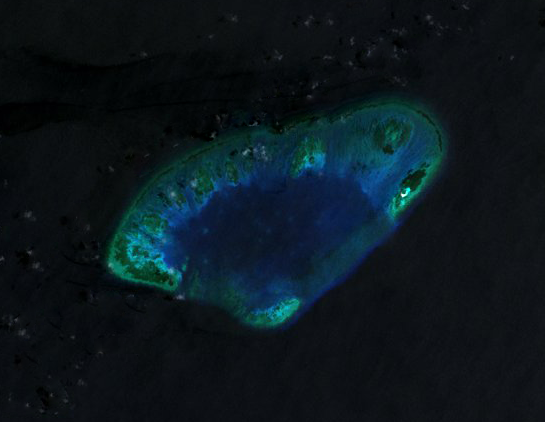
West London Reef

The London Reefs are located between 8°49′N 112°12′E and 8°56′N 112°52′E (8.82°N 112.2°E and 8.94°N 112.86°E) in the Spratly Islands of the South China Sea.

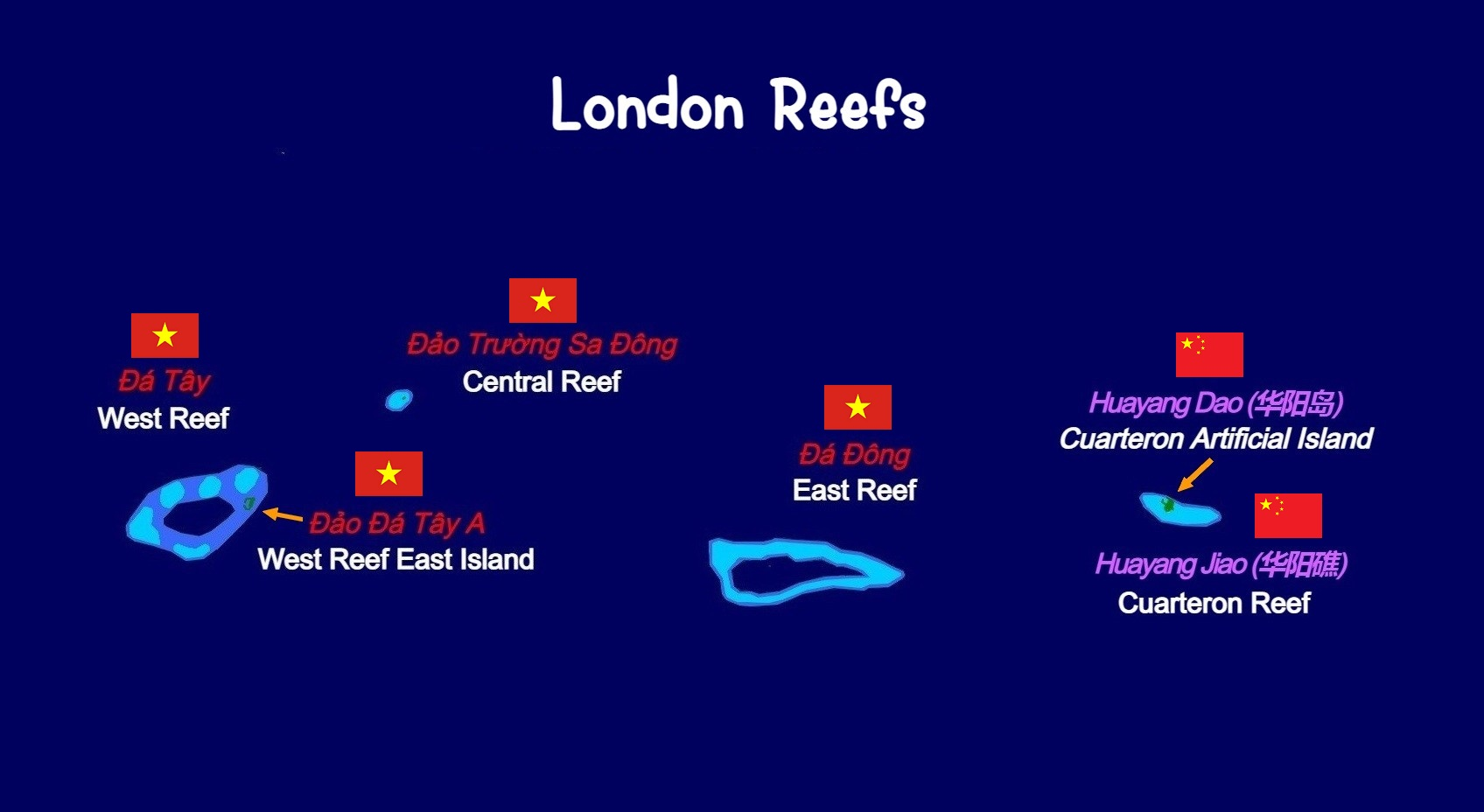
London Reefs

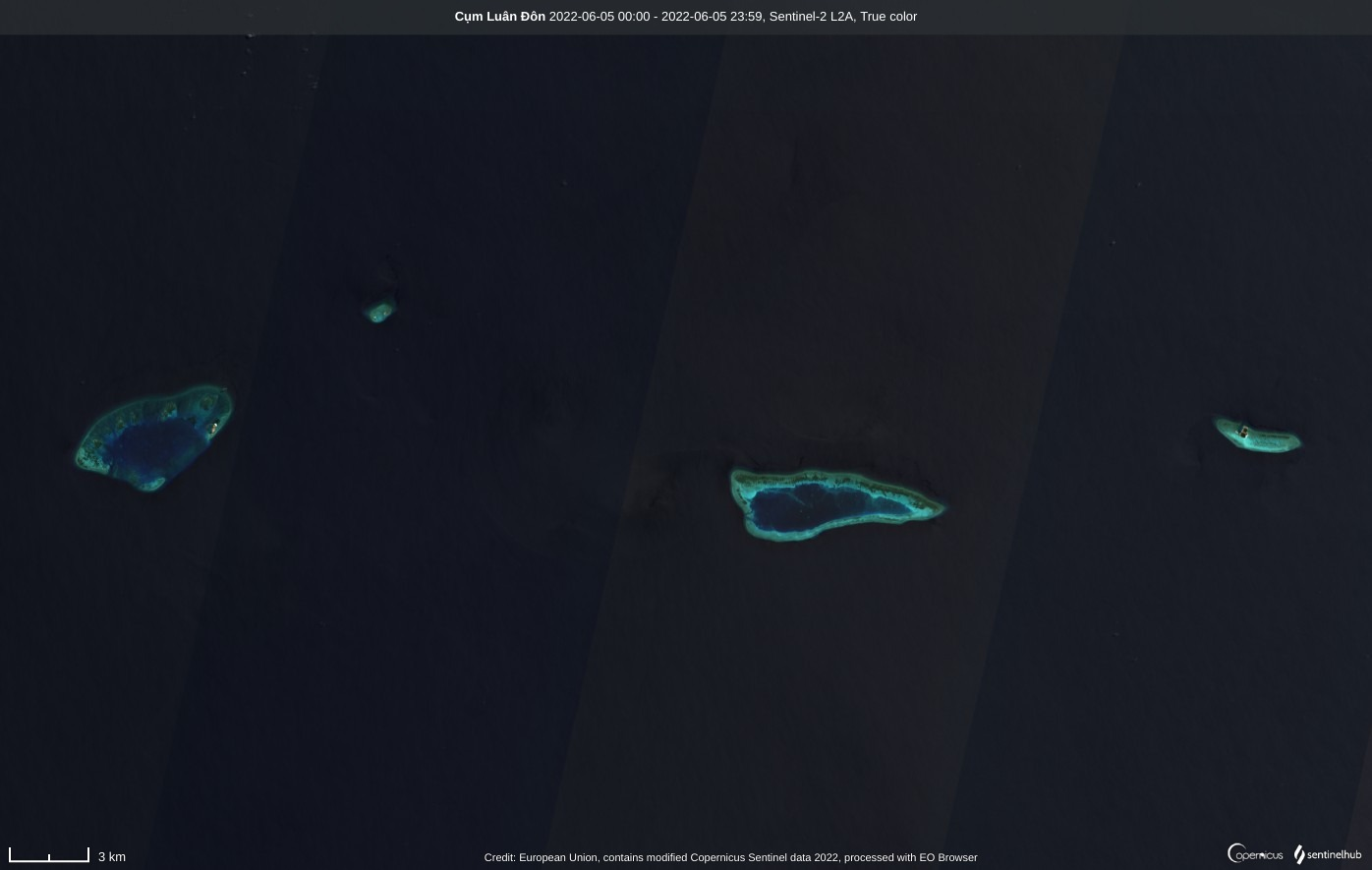

The four major features within the area (Central London Reef, Cuarteron Reef, East London Reef, and West London Reef), are known by many names:

Name	Latitude	Longitude	Coordinates	International name
Con Tay	8.850000	112.533333	8°51′00″N 112°32′00″E	London Reefs
da Tay	8.850000	112.533333	8°51′00″N 112°32′00″E	London Reefs
London Reefs	8.850000	112.533333	8°51′00″N 112°32′00″E	London Reefs
Yinqing Qunjiao	8.850000	112.533333	8°51′00″N 112°32′00″E	London Reefs
Central London Reef	8.935000	112.348333	8°56′06″N 112°20′54″E	Central London Reef
Central Reef	8.935000	112.348333	8°56′06″N 112°20′54″E	Central London Reef
Dao Truong Sa Dong	8.935000	112.348333	8°56′06″N 112°20′54″E	Central London Reef
Gitnang Quezon	8.935000	112.348333	8°56′06″N 112°20′54″E	Central London Reef
Terumbu Gitna	8.935000	112.348333	8°56′06″N 112°20′54″E	Central London Reef
Trường Sa Đông	8.935000	112.348333	8°56′06″N 112°20′54″E	Central London Reef
Zhong Jiao	8.935000	112.348333	8°56′06″N 112°20′54″E	Central London Reef
Bai Chau Vien	8.883333	112.851389	8°53′00″N 112°51′05″E	Cuarteron Reef
Calderon Reef	8.883333	112.851389	8°53′00″N 112°51′05″E	Cuarteron Reef
Cuarteron Reef	8.883333	112.851389	8°53′00″N 112°51′05″E	Cuarteron Reef
đá Châu Viên	8.883333	112.851389	8°53′00″N 112°51′05″E	Cuarteron Reef
Huayang Jiao	8.883333	112.851389	8°53′00″N 112°51′05″E	Cuarteron Reef
Terumbu Calderon	8.883333	112.851389	8°53′00″N 112°51′05″E	Cuarteron Reef
Đá Đông	8.828333	112.596667	8°49′42″N 112°35′48″E	East London Reef
Dong Jiao	8.828333	112.596667	8°49′42″N 112°35′48″E	East London Reef
East London Reef	8.828333	112.596667	8°49′42″N 112°35′48″E	East London Reef
East Reef	8.828333	112.596667	8°49′42″N 112°35′48″E	East London Reef
Silangan	8.828333	112.596667	8°49′42″N 112°35′48″E	East London Reef
Terumbu Silangan	8.828333	112.596667	8°49′42″N 112°35′48″E	East London Reef
Đá Tây	8.850000	112.200000	8°51′00″N 112°12′00″E	West London Reef
Kanlurang	8.850000	112.200000	8°51′00″N 112°12′00″E	West London Reef
Terumbu Kanluran	8.850000	112.200000	8°51′00″N 112°12′00″E	West London Reef
West London Reef	8.850000	112.200000	8°51′00″N 112°12′00″E	West London Reef
West Reef	8.850000	112.200000	8°51′00″N 112°12′00″E	West London Reef
Xi Jiao	8.850000	112.200000	8°51′00″N 112°12′00″E	West London Reef
