= Scarborough station =

Scarborough station may refer to:

- Scarborough (Metro-North station), in Scarborough, New York, USA
- Scarborough Centre station, light rail station in Scarborough, Ontario, Canada
- Scarborough GO Station, in Scarborough, Ontario, Canada
- Scarborough railway station, in Scarborough, North Yorkshire, UK
- Scarborough Londesborough Road railway station, former station in Scarborough, North Yorkshire, UK
- Scarborough railway station, New South Wales, in Scarborough, New South Wales, Australia

== See also ==
- Scarborough (disambiguation)
