= Scarborough North =

Scarborough North may refer to:

- Scarborough North (federal electoral district), federal riding in Toronto, Ontario, Canada
- Scarborough North (provincial electoral district), provincial riding in Toronto, Ontario, Canada
- Ward 23 Scarborough North, municipal ward in Toronto, Ontario, Canada

== See also ==
- North Scarborough, an area within the town of Scarborough, Maine, US
- Scarborough (disambiguation)
