= Scarborough Fair =

Scarborough Fair or Scarboro Fair may refer to:

- Scarborough Fair (fair), a late medieval fair in Scarborough, North Yorkshire
- "Scarborough Fair" (ballad), a traditional English ballad
- Scarborough Fair Collection, a museum of fairground mechanical organs and showman's engines in Scarborough, North Yorkshire
- Scarborough Faire, also known as Scarborough Renaissance Festival, a Renaissance fair in Waxahachie, Texas
- Scarboro Fair, a defunct agricultural show in Scarborough, Ontario
- Scarborough Fair, a set of four handguns used by Bayonetta in the video game Bayonetta

== See also ==
- Scarborough Festival, an end of season series of cricket matches in Scarborough, North Yorkshire
