= Scarborough (surname) =

Scarborough is a surname of English origin. Notable people with the surname include:

- Adrian Scarborough (born 1968), English actor
- Andrew Scarborough (born 1973), English actor
- Chuck Scarborough (born 1943), American television news anchor
- Edmund Scarborough (c.1617–1671), Virginia politician, soldier and landowner
- Edmund Scarborough (1840–?), Mississippi politician, minister and farmer
- Elizabeth Ann Scarborough (born 1947), American fantasy/science fiction writer
- George Scarborough (1859–1900), an American Western lawman and outlaw
- J. Gifford Scarborough (died 1969), American politician and lawyer
- Joe Scarborough (born 1938), English painter of humorous scenes of the life and people in South Yorkshire
- Joe Scarborough (born 1963), American politician, cable TV news personality, and musician
- Kelvin Scarborough (1964–2020), American baseball player
- Lee Rutland Scarborough (1870–1945), American Southern Baptist pastor
- Robert H. Scarborough (1923–2020) United States Coast Guard vice admiral
- Tony Scarborough (born 1946), justice of the New Mexico Supreme Court
- William Sanders Scarborough (1852–1926), American classics scholar
- Eve Scarborough (born 1999), a subject of the BBC documentary film series Child of Our Time

== Scarboro ==
- David Scarboro (1968–1988), English actor (EastEnders)
- Harold Scarboro (died 1944), American politician and newspaper editor
- Silas Scarboro (1827–1907), American politician and physician from Maryland

== See also ==
- Earl of Scarbrough
