= Scarborough Formation (Ontario) =

- Stratigraphic range: Pleistocene
- Type: Formation

Location
- Region: Ontario
- Country: Canada

The Scarborough Formation is a Pleistocene geologic formation in Ontario.

== See also ==
- List of fossiliferous stratigraphic units in Ontario
