= Scarborough (1740 EIC ship) =

History

East India Company Ensign
- Name: Scarborough
- Owner: John Raymond
- Builder: Carter, Limehouse
- Launched: December 1740
- Fate: Sold 1753 for breaking up

General characteristics
- Tons burthen: 499, (Note: The registered tonnage is incorrect. Following Queen Anne's charter of 1702, between 1708 and 1747 almost every EIC vessel was registered as being of under 500 tons (bm). The reason was that the charter required every vessel of 500 tons or over to carry a chaplain. Apparently the Directors of the EIC did not feel this was a worthwhile expense.) or 545 (bm)
- Propulsion: Sail
- Complement: 99
- Armament: 30 guns

Scarborough was an East Indiaman launched in December 1740 that performed four trips to India and China for the British East India Company (EIC). She is most famous for giving her name to Scarborough Shoal (or Scarborough Reef), which she discovered by grounding there on 12 September 1748 under the leadership of Captain Philip D'Auvergne. She was sold for breaking up in 1753.

== Repair ==
In May 1741 Scarborough was at Portsmouth, undergoing repairs that necessitated unloading, repairing her, and reloading her.

Scarborough was under the command of Captain George Westcott, who had already made two trips to India on her predecessor, Scarborough.

== Voyages ==
=== Voyage #1 (1741-42) ===
Captain Westcott left Portsmouth on 4 May 1741, bound for Madras and Bengal. She reached the Cape on 14 August and Vizagapatam on 15 December, before she arrived at Culpee (an anchorage towards Calcutta, on 11 January 1742. Homeward bound, she reached St Helena on 21 June. The Indiamen Scarborough, Northampton, Queen Caroline, Halifax, Royal George, Kent, and snow Swift left St Helena on 26 June, together with their escorts, HMS Argyll and HMS Lynn. They arrived safe off of Dover on 16 September. Scarborough arrived at Portsmouth on 19 September, and the Downs on 28 September.

=== Voyage #2 (1744-47) ===
The departure of Captain Westcott's 2nd voyage according to List of Factory records of the late East India Company preserved in the record department of the India Office, London and published in 1897 shows that the date was 13 October 1744. The ship was bound for Madeira, Madras, Ballasore and Rogues River. The log book of Cptn Westcott noted that "many crew ran before the ship sailed" and many ran at Lisbon. Scarborough reached Madras on 20 December 1745 and left Madras for Bombay on 01 January 1746. The ship's log noted that Chief Mate Philip D'Auvergne "took over as Captain" most likely because of ill-health of George Westcott and records show he "dyed" on the 18th June 1746 and was buried at sea. Latt so 33:36 Long 1:6 (approx 870kms off Sth Africa)

16months & 23 days wages were paid at 10 pound per day. By effects sold 4 pound paid to the Company Treasury on the 22nd March 1747. The ship arrived back in England on the 28th Feb 1747. Cptn George's Will proved 06 March 1747

=== Voyage #3 (1748-49) - Grounding on Scarborough Shoal ===
Captain Philip D'Auvergne left Portsmouth on 25 January 1748, bound for Fort St David and China. Scarborough arrived at Fort St David on 8 June. Continuing on to China, she was at Malacca on 12 August.

Scarborough grounded on one of the rocks of Scarborough Shoal (15°11′N 117°46′E) on 12 September. D'Auvergne first tried to lighten her by throwing her guns overboard and emptying water casks, to no avail. Pulling her with anchors and boats also proved futile. Eventually, tides and swells lifted her off.

She arrived at Whampoa on 21 September. Homeward bound, she crossed the Second Bar (about 20 miles before Whampoa) on 15 December, reached the Cape on 3 March 1749 and St Helena on 1 April, and arrived at the Downs on 20 June.

=== Voyage #4 (1751-1753) ===
Captain Philip D'Auvergne left the Downs on 1 February 1751, bound for Madras and Bengal. Scarborough reached São Tiago, Cape Verde, on 27 February and Fort St David on 7 July. She arrived at Madras on 21 July and Culpee on 6 August. Homeward bound, she was at Barrabulla (or Barra Bulla), which is a sandbank that forms near Kedgeree in the Hooghli River, on 23 February 1852. She had to stop at Mauritius on 15 June for repairs, and did not leave until 20 October. She reached St Helena on 2 December, and arrived at the Downs on 10 February 1753.

== Fate ==
Her owners sold Scarborough in 1753 for breaking up.
