= Scarborough (1734 EIC ship) =

History

British East India Company
- Name: Scarborough
- Owner: John Raymond
- Builder: Buxton, Rotherhithe
- Launched: December 1734
- Fate: Sold 21 November 1739

Great Britain
- Name: HMS Scarborough
- Acquired: 21 November 1739 by purchase
- Fate: Sold 18 December 1744

General characteristics
- Tons burthen: 50125/94 (bm)
- Length: Overall: 116 ft 8 in (35.6 m); Keel: 96 ft 6 in (29.4 m)
- Beam: 31 ft 3 in (9.5 m)
- Depth of hold: 13 ft 8 in (4.2 m)
- Propulsion: Sail
- Armament: 18 guns (RN service)

Scarborough was an East Indiaman launched in December 1734 that performed two voyages for the British East India Company (EIC). The Admiralty purchased her in 1739 and commissioned her as HMS Scarborough. The original intent was to use her as a storeship, but instead she was fitted up as a hospital ship. The Admiralty sold her in 1744.

== EIC service ==
EIC voyage #1 (1735–36) Captain George Westcott (or Westcote) left the Downs on 17 March 1735, bound for Bombay. Scarborough reached Mozambique on 24 June and Johanna on 7 July, and arrived at Bombay on 11 August. She visited Tellicherry on 17 October, Calicut on 22 October, Cochin on 3 November, Calicut again on 9 November, Tellicherry again on 15 November, and Goa on 26 November, before returning to Bombay on 18 December. Homeward bound, she stopped at Tellicherry on 11 January 1736 and Anjengo on 22 January, reached the Cape of Good Hope on 12 April and 14 May St Helena on 14 May, before finally arriving at the Downs on 11 August.

EIC voyage #2 (1738–39) Captain Westcott left the Downs on 2 February 1738, bound for Madras, Bengal, and Benkulen. On 3 March Scarborough reached São Tiago, on 10 June Johanna, on 19 July Fort St David, on 30 July Madras, and on 9 September Balasore, before arriving at Rogues River (a section of the Hooghly River), 19 September. Scarborough was Ingeli (a point on the Hugli (or Hoogli) River), on 9 November. She reached Acheh on 28 November, and arrived at Benkulen on 27 December. Homeward bound, she was at St Helena on 20 May 1739, and reached Falmouth on 24 August. Scarborough arrived at the Downs on 6 September.

Westcott would go on to make four voyages to India for the EIC on a second Scarborough.

== Royal Navy service ==
Scarborough arrived at Woolwich on 29 November 1739. She did not commence fitting out as a store ship until June 1740, but already on 6 June orders were received to prepare her for service as a hospital ship. On 2 July Commander James Smith commissioned her as HMS Scarborough. She completed her fitting out on 21 August.

On 26 September Commander William Carter replaced Smith. On 4 March 1741 Scarborough took part in the unsuccessful British operations against Cartagena, Colombia. Then in July she participated in the unsuccessful operations against Santiago de Cuba.

In 1742 Commander Robert Swanton took command of Scarborough, which was on the Jamaica station.

In 1743, Commander James Scott replaced Swanton, with Scarborough still on the Jamaica station.

== Fate ==
The Navy sold Scarborough at Deptford on 18 December 1744 for £413.
