= Skaraborg =

Skaraborg County is a former county of Sweden.

Skaraborg may also refer to:

== Places ==
- Västergötland, a historical province of Sweden that includes the area of the former county
- Västra Götaland County, a current county of Sweden that includes the area of the former county

== Military units ==
- Skaraborg Regiment (infantry), former Swedish infantry regiment whose soldiers were recruited from the former county
- Skaraborg Regiment (armoured), Swedish armoured regiment converted from the former infantry regiment
- Skaraborg Brigade, Swedish mechanised brigade that was previously part of the armoured regiment of the same name
- Skaraborg Wing, Swedish Air Force wing
