= Scarborough Centre =

Scarborough Centre may refer to:

- Scarborough City Centre, a business district and neighbourhood in Toronto, Ontario, Canada
- Scarborough Centre station, a former subway station in Toronto, Ontario, Canada
- Scarborough Centre Bus Terminal, an intercity coach terminal in Toronto, Ontario, Canada
- Scarborough Town Centre, a shopping mall in Toronto, Ontario, Canada
- Scarborough Centre (federal electoral district), federal riding in Toronto, Ontario, Canada
- Scarborough Centre (provincial electoral district), provincial riding in Toronto, Ontario, Canada
- Ward 21 Scarborough Centre, municipal ward in Toronto, Ontario, Canada

== See also ==
- Scarborough railway station, also known as "Scarborough Central", North Yorkshire, England
