= Scarbrough =

Scarbrough is a surname. Notable people with the surname include:

- Bo Scarbrough (born 1996), American football player
- Dan Scarbrough (born 1978), former rugby union player who played on the wing or full back for Leeds Tykes, Saracens, Racing Métro and England
- John Scarbrough (1885–1960), college football player
- Lucy Scarbrough (1927–2020), American musician
- T. G. Scarbrough, American football coach

== See also ==
- Earl of Scarbrough, a title in the Peerage of England
- William Scarbrough House, historic house in Savannah, Georgia
- Scarbrough Stakes, listed flat horse race in Great Britain
- Scarborough (disambiguation), many place names
