= Cuarteron Reef =

Reef in the South China Sea

Disputed reef
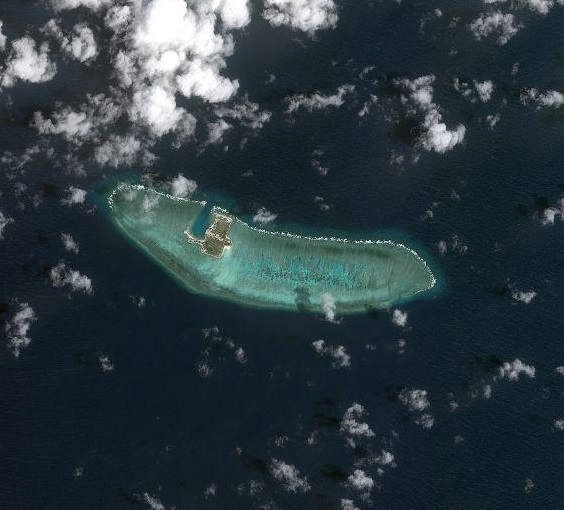
- Cuarteron Reef

- Location of the major claimed islands in the Sansha administrative area of China. Legend：: Black：α – Yongxing Island (Woody Island) (seat of Sansha); Red：β – Chigua Reef (Johnson South Reef); Green：γ – Dongmen Reef (Hughes Reef); Yellow：δ – Huangyan Island (Scarborough Shoal); Red：ε – Huayang Reef (Cuarteron Reef); Blue：ζ – Meiji Reef (Mischief Reef); Blue：η – Nanxun Reef (Gaven Reefs); Black：θ – Zhongjian Island (Triton Island); Green：κ – Yongshu Reef (Fiery Cross Reef); Purple：λ – Zhubi Reef (Subi Reef)

- Location within Spratly Islands
- Other names: 華陽礁/华阳礁 Huáyáng Jiāo (Chinese); Bahura ng Calderon (Filipino); Calderon Reef (Philippine English); Đá Châu Viên (Vietnamese); Terumbu Kalderon (Malay)

Geography
- Location: South China Sea
- Coordinates: 8°51′50″N 112°49′40″E
- Archipelago: Spratly Islands

Administration
- China
- Province: Hainan
- Prefecture-level City: Sansha
- District: Nansha District

Claimed by
- China
- Philippines
- Taiwan
- Vietnam

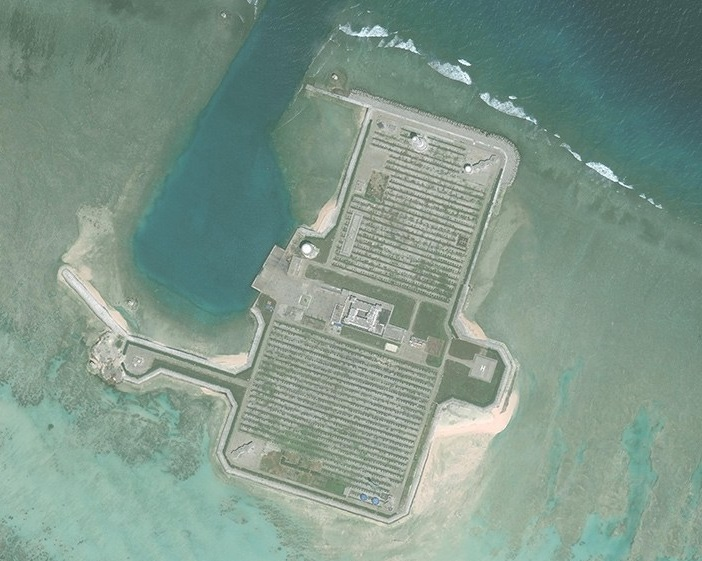
Satellite image as of October 2020.

Cuarteron Reef, also known as Calderon Reef (Mandarin Chinese: 華陽礁/华阳礁; pinyin: Huáyáng Jiāo; Filipino: Bahura ng Calderon; Vietnamese: Đá Châu Viên; Malay: Terumbu Kalderon), is a reef at the east end of the London Reefs in the Spratly Islands of the South China Sea. It is administrated and controlled by China (PRC) (as part of Sansha), and also claimed by the Philippines (as part of Kalayaan), by Vietnam (as part of Truong Sa) and Taiwan (ROC). The reef is 3 nautical miles (5.6 km; 3.5 mi) long and has an area of 8 square kilometres (3.1 sq mi) (800 hectares (2,000 acres)).

== Geographical features ==
On 12 July 2016, the tribunal of the Permanent Court of Arbitration concluded that Cuarteron Reef contains, within the meaning of Article 121(1) of the Convention, naturally formed areas of land, surrounded by water, which are above water at high tide. However, for purposes of Article 121(3) of the convention, the high-tide features at Cuarteron Reef is rocks that cannot sustain human habitation or economic life of their own and accordingly shall be entitled to 12nmi of territorial sea measured from its baseline but have no exclusive economic zone or continental shelf.

== Chinese construction projects ==
Prior to 2016, Cuarteron reef had a supply platform and a reef fortress. In 2015 the Philippine government released what it claimed were photos of a six-story facility being built by the Chinese government on the reef. Also in 2015, China completed the construction of a 50 metres (160 ft) high lighthouse on the reef. By late 2015, China had expanded the reef's usable area to 23 hectares (57 acres), reportedly including in the process two helicopter pads, and possibly gun, radar and missile emplacements. As of 2016, China was reportedly building a high-power radar installation on the reef.

In late 2016, photographs emerged which suggested that Cuarteron Reef has been armed with anti-aircraft weapons and a CIWS missile-defence system.

== See also ==
- Great Wall of Sand
- Nine-dash line
