= Scarborough Shoal =

Disputed atoll in the South China Sea

Disputed atoll
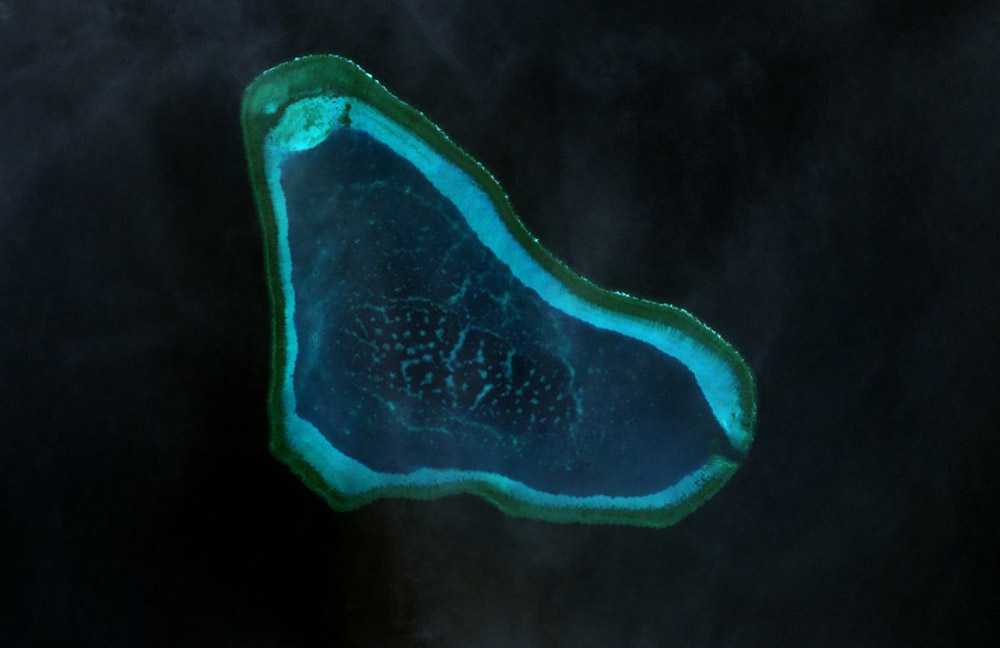
- Landsat 7 image of Scarborough Shoal in 2000

- Location within South China Sea Location within Southeast Asia
- Other names: Bajo de Masinloc; Democracy Reef; Panacot Shoal; Panatag Shoal; Scarborough Reef

Geography
- Location: South China Sea
- Coordinates: 15°11′N 117°46′E
- Total islands: 2 islets with many reefs
- Major islands: 1
- Highest elevation: 1.8 m (5.9 ft)
- Highest point: South Rock

Administration
- China (de facto since 2012 (Note: See the 2012 Scarborough Shoal standoff article.))
- Province: Hainan
- Prefecture-level city: Sansha
- District: Xisha

Claimed by
- Philippines (Administration from 1946 to 2012)
- Province: Zambales
- Municipality: Masinloc
- Taiwan
- Municipality District: Kaohsiung; Cijin

Demographics
- Population: 0

Scarborough Shoal, also known as Panacot, Bajo de Masinloc ("Masinloc Shoal" in Spanish), Huangyan Island (Mandarin Chinese: 黄岩岛; pinyin: Huáng Yán Dǎo; lit. 'yellow rock island'), Minzhu Jiao (Guoyu Chinese: 民主礁; lit. 'Democracy Reef'), and Panatag Shoal (Filipino: Buhanginan ng Panatag, lit. 'serene sandbank'), is a coral atoll/reef with an inner lagoon and several rocks above high tide, located between Macclesfield Bank to the west and Luzon to the east. Luzon is 220 kilometres (119 nmi) away and the nearest landmass.

The atoll is a disputed territory claimed by the People's Republic of China, the Republic of China (Taiwan), and the Republic of the Philippines. Since the 2012 standoff, the feature has been under de facto Chinese control, with a continuous China Coast Guard presence regulating access at the lagoon entrance; no permanent structures have been built on the feature.

In 2013, the Philippines initiated arbitration against China under the United Nations Convention on the Law of the Sea. In 2016, the tribunal ruled that China's historic rights claims within the nine-dash line were without lawful effect, held that Scarborough Shoal is a rock under Article 121(3) (generating no EEZ), and affirmed traditional fishing rights for both Filipino and Chinese artisanal fishers; it did not rule on sovereignty.

The shoal lies within 370 kilometres (200 nmi) of Luzon and is described by the Philippines as within its EEZ, a characterization rejected by China, which asserts sovereignty over the feature and adjacent waters. Since 2023 the shoal has seen floating-barrier episodes and repeated water-cannon confrontations; in September 2025 China announced the Huangyan Island National Nature Reserve, prompting Philippine protests.

The shoal's English name comes from the British civilian merchant vessel Scarborough, which grounded on one of the rocks on 12 September 1748 before sailing on to China. (Note: While the date of the Scarborough Shoal grounding is 1748, there is a text typo of 1784 in an 1801 reference which can cause confusion. This source also gives the correct date of 1748 in another table.)

== Geography ==
Scarborough Shoal forms a triangle-shaped chain of reefs and rocks with a perimeter of 46 km (29 mi). It covers an area of 150 km^{2} (58 sq mi), including an inner lagoon. The atolls' highest point, South Rock, is 1.8 m (5 ft 11 in) above sea level at high tide. North of South Rock is a channel, about 370 m (1,214 ft) wide and 9–11 m (30–36 ft) deep, leading into the lagoon. Several other coral rocks encircle the lagoon, forming a large atoll.

The atoll is about 198 km (123 mi) west of Subic Bay. The 5,000–6,000 m (16,000–20,000 ft) deep Manila Trench lies between the atoll and Luzon to the east. The nearest land is in Palauig, Zambales, on Luzon, 220 km (119 nmi) due east.

== International laws ==
The doctrine of intertemporal law was established after the Island of Palmas Case ruling. Under the doctrine, treaty rights are assessed under the laws in force at the time the treaty is made, not at the time a dispute takes place. "Were any island within those described bounds ascertained to belong in fact to Japan, China, Great Britain or Holland, the United States could derive no valid title from its ostensible inclusion in the Spanish cession."

International law on claims differ depending on whether the territory is inhabited. In the 1928 Island of Palmas case, for inhabited territories, the court ruled that "although continuous in principle, sovereignty cannot be exercised in fact at every moment on every point of a territory. The intermittence and discontinuity compatible with the maintenance of the right necessarily differ according as inhabited or inhabited regions are involved, or region enclosed within territories in which sovereignty is incontestably displayed or again regions accessible from, for instance, the high seas." For uninhabited territories, the 1931 Clipperton Island case ruled that "if a territory, by virtue of the fact it was completely uninhabited, is, from the first moment when the occupying state makes its appearance there, at the absolute and undisputed disposition of that state, from the moment the taking of possession must be considered as accomplished, and the occupation is thereby completed. [T]he fact that [France] has not exercised her authority there in a positive manner does not imply the forfeiture of an acquisition already definitely perfected." The ruling was affirmed in the 1933 Eastern Greenland case.

In the Eastern Greenland Case between Norway and Denmark, the critical date doctrine was established. It was ruled by the Permanent Court of International Justice (PCIJ) that the Norwegian proclamation on 10 July 1931, annexing Eastern Greenland was the "critical date" in that case.

Under the principle of uti possidetis juris, all states must respect former colonies' boundaries. This was established after the Frontier Dispute case between Burkina Faso and Mali. The ICJ ruled that uti possidetis juris is a "general principle, which is logically connected with the phenomenon of the obtaining of independence, wherever it occurs. Its obvious purpose is to prevent the independence and stability of new States being endangered by fratricidal struggles provoked by the challenging of frontiers following the withdrawal of the administering power…Its purpose, at the time of the achievement of independence by the former Spanish colonies of America, was to scotch any designs which non-American colonizing powers might have on regions which had been assigned by the former metropolitan State to one division or another, but which were still uninhabited or unexplored."

In international law, maps cannot establish title to territory unless attached to a treaty. Moreover, maps unilaterally produced by a state, even if not attached to a treaty, can bind the producing state if it is "adverse to its interest". This was established in the 2002 Delimitation of the Border between the State of Eritrea and Ethiopia case, and was affirmed in the Pedra Blanca arbitration between Malaysia and Singapore in 2008, when the ICJ ruled: "The map still stands as a statement of geographical fact, especially when the State adversely affected has itself produced and disseminated it, even against its own interest."

== History ==
The 1734 Velarde map shows Galit, Panacot, (Note: The island later named Spratley Island (also known as Bajo de Masinloc (or South Maroona / Marsingola)) has been surmised to be Panacot.) Lumbay, Los Bajos de Paragua, as well as Borney. The map was one of the key evidences in the Philippines v. China PCA case against China's so-called nine-dash line claims.

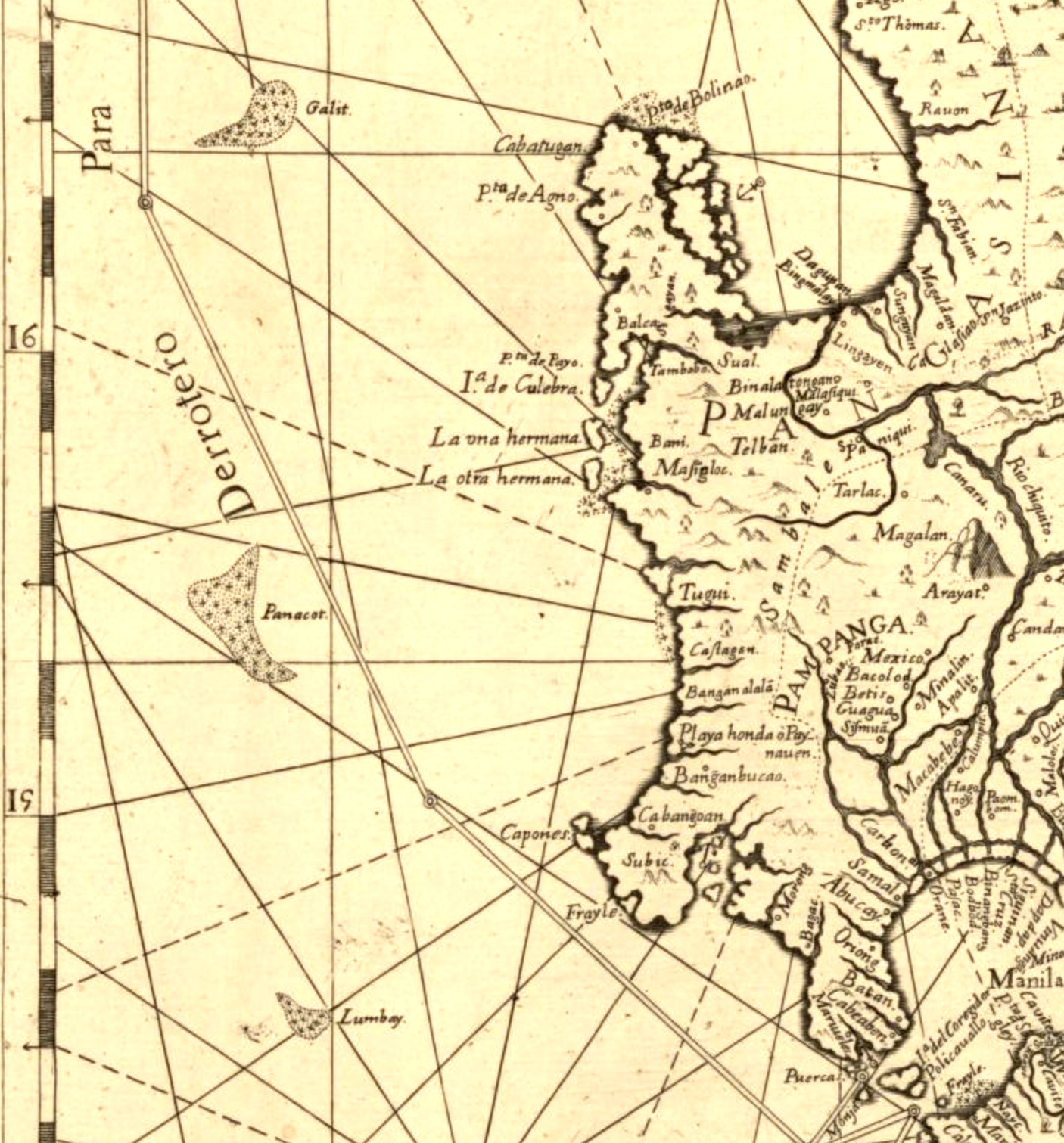
Galit, Panacot, and Lumbay shown off the coast of Central Luzon in the 1734 map

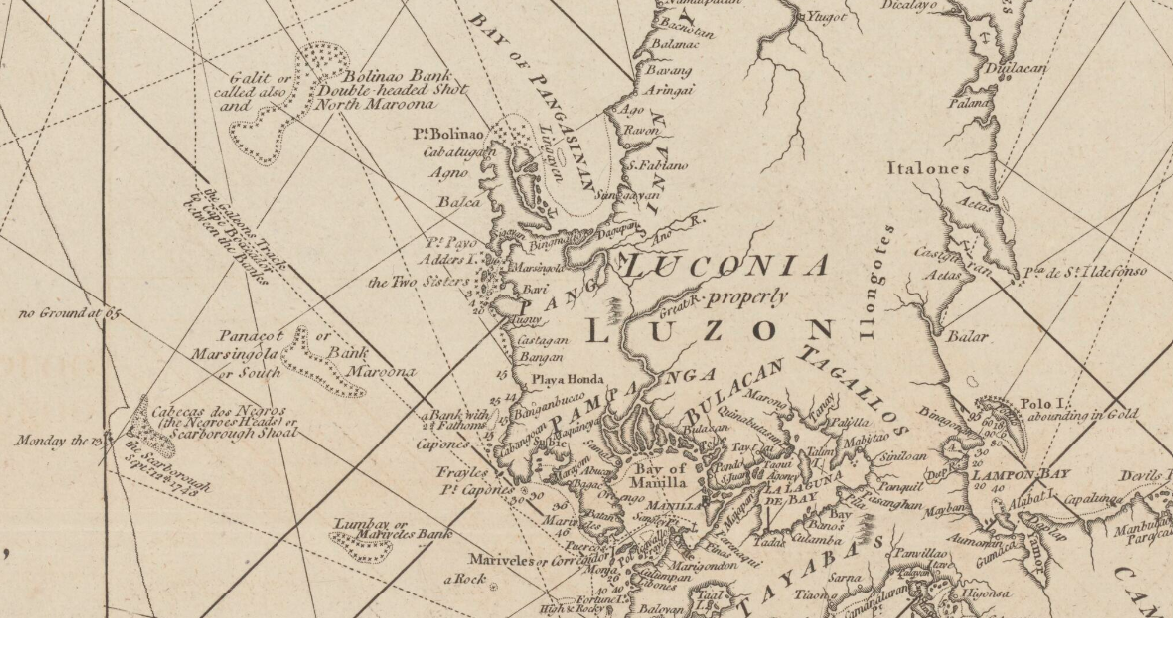
Galit, Panacot, Lumbay and Scarborough Shoal shown off the coast of Central Luzon in the 1794 map

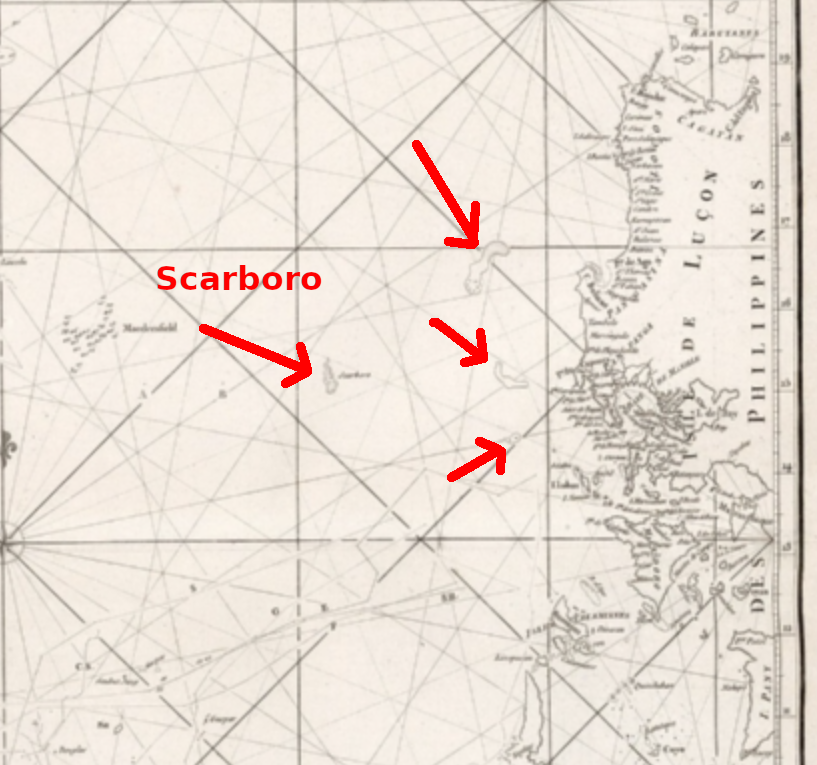
Scarborough Shoal, along with Galit, Panacot, and Lumbay shown off the coast of Central Luzon in the 1810 map, originally published in 1771.

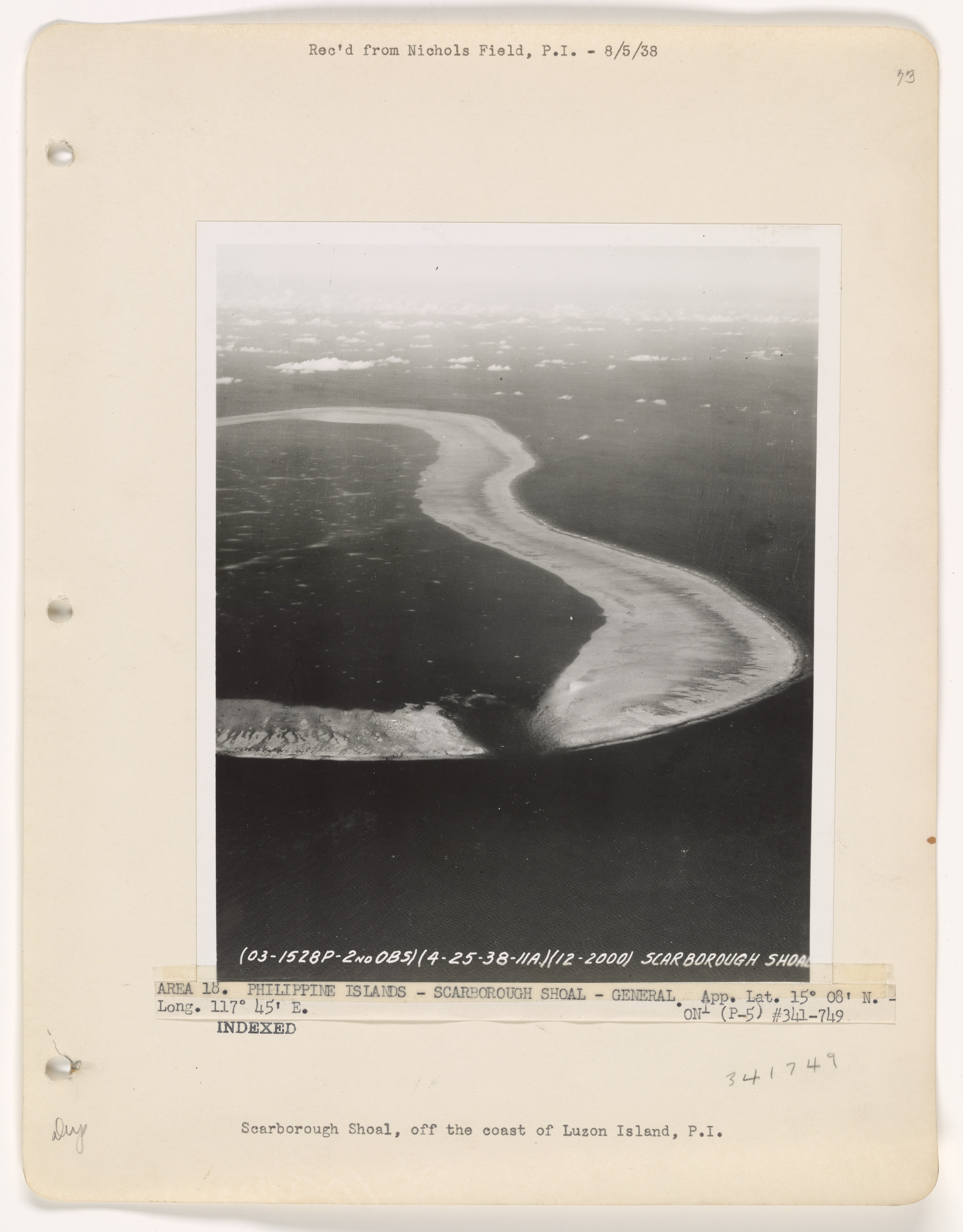
Aerial view of Scarborough Shoal (1938)

Scarborough Shoal is named in English after the British civilian merchant ship Scarborough which grounded on the feature on 12 September 1748.

The Philippines believes that it refers to one of the three islands, Galit ("anger"), Panacot (panakot, "threat"), and Lumbay (lumbáy, "gloom"), shown off the coast of Central Luzon in the 1734 Velarde map, amid other maps depicting Scarborough Shoal, Galit, Panacot and Lumbay published in the same timeframe.

A number of countries have made historic claims of the use of Scarborough Shoal. In April 1800 it was named Maroona Shoal, after being surveyed by the Santa Lucía, a Spanish frigate under orders of admiral Malaspina, and this name was used on a chart in 1808, but later replaced in the Philippines by the name Bajo de Masinglo. The name "Maroona Shoal" was still in dual use on marine charts in English in 1889.

In 1734, the Spanish colonial government published the first edition of the Velarde map, showing locations included in the territory of the Philippines. According to the Philippines, the map shows actual sovereignty over Scarborough Shoal (labelled Panacot in the map), and the Spratly Islands (labelled Los Bajos de Paragua), and is the earliest map which shows sovereignty over the said territories. The atolls' present name in English was chosen by Captain Philippe D'Auvergne, whose East India Company East Indiaman Scarborough briefly grounded on one of the rocks on 12 September 1748, before sailing on to China.

There are Qing Dynasty maps based on 1767 work that show multiple islands in the South China Sea. The farthest are near the coast of Hainan Island and mainland China, rather than the islands near the Spratly Islands or Scarborough Shoal. (Note: Two Qing dynasty maps are held in USA Library of Congress. They both are catalogued as having been created from original 1767 work. An 1811 version Chinese language title has been translated as "The great Qing Dynasty's complete map of all under heaven" and this map has labelled detail on many of the islands. A later version has been translated as "Complete geographical map of the great Qing Dynasty, Complete and general map of everlasting China")

In 1771, Jean-Baptiste Nicolas Denis d'Après de Mannevillette published a map of the China Sea which includes Scarborough Shoal, along with three unnamed shoals which are close to the Luzon coast. The Spanish colonial government of the Captaincy General of the Philippines launched an initial survey of Scarborough Shoal on 4 May 1792. The survey, Plano de la Navigación, was taken by Alejandro Malaspina aboard the ship Santa Lucía, with Filipino comrades. A chart published in 1794, shows Scarborough Shoal in some detail with the date of the grounding incident indicated, while showing Galit, Panacot, and Lumbay only as dotted outlines. In 1808, the Spanish colonial government published the 1808 Carta General del Archipiélago Filipino, showing its sovereign territory of the Philippines, which included Scarborough Shoal and the Spratlys, as recognized by the international community. In 1875, a more complete edition of the Carta General del Archipiélago Filipino was published by the Spanish colonial government to define the official territory of the Philippines.

After the Spanish-American War, Spain in 1898 ceded the Philippines to the United States of America through the Treaty of Paris (1898), and it had maps as annexes.The map clearly shows that the treaty's definition of Philippine territory did not include Scarborough Shoal. Because parts of Tawi-Tawi remained under Spanish control as these were outside treaty lines. This led to the signing of the Treaty of Washington (1900), which according to the Philippines retroactively ceded Scarborough Shoal, the Spratlys, and the remainder of Tawi-Tawi to the United States as part of Philippine territory. Analysts believe that the 1900 Treaty of Washington concerned only the islands of Sibutu and Cagayan de Sulu, as well as Scarborough Shoal. In the Islas Palmas case, the United States, as representative of the territory of the Philippines, reiterated in a memorandum that the 1875 Carta General del Archipiélago Filipino "is both an American official and a Spanish official map" of Philippine territory. According to the Philippines, this bound the United States on its recognition of the Scarborough Shoal and the Spratly Islands as Philippine territory. From 1899 to 1902, the United States war department in the territory of the Philippines republished and reissued four more times the 1875 Carta General del Archipiélago Filipino, with updated features like military telegraph and cable lines, Eastern Cable Company lines, and military department boundaries. The maps included Scarborough Shoal as part of Philippine territory, according to the Philippines.

In 1909, Qing China led an expedition to the Paracels, and for the first time formally declared its claim.

International salvage litigation resulting from the wreck of the Swedish ship Nippon on 8 May 1913, on Scarborough Shoal, was heard and recognised by claimants in the Philippines.

In the 1930s, the Republic of China and the Insular Government of the Philippines Islands, each without the knowledge of the other, pursued actions relevant to their respective claims on Scarborough Shoal. China published a map including Scarborough Shoal in its territory in April 1935.

In 1935, the Commonwealth of the Philippines was inaugurated under the 1935 Constitution, which reiterated the territorial claims of the Philippines as per the 1898 Treaty of Paris, the 1900 Treaty of Washington, and the 1930 US-UK Treaty.

In 1938, the Commonwealth asked the United States Department of State to determine ownership of Scarborough Shoal, but there was no documentary evidence of an official Philippine claim over Scarborough Shoal.

In 1943, China published "China Handbook (1937-1943)" during the Second Sino-Japanese War, which defined the southernmost point of the country was "Triton Island of the Paracel Group". China revised the content in 1947, claiming the Spratlys as their southernmost territory for the first time in history. In the 1947 China Handbook, China specifically recognized the Spratlys are contested among China, the Philippines, and French Indochina. (Note: The original reference to this statement was There is the possibility that the actual reference should be China Handbook 1937–1945, New Edition with 1946 Supplement. Compiled by Chinese Ministry of Information. New York: Macmillan Co.; 1947. Pp. xvi, 844.)

The Philippine government conducted an oceanographic survey in 1957, and in 1965, the Philippine flag was raised on the shoal.

In an article from 18 February 1980, the Beijing Review confirmed that astronomer Guo Shoujing built an observatory in the Paracel Islands, and not Scarborough Shoal.

When the People's Republic of China built facilities on Mischief Reef within the Philippine EEZ in 1995, then-National Security Advisor Jose T. Almonte pushed for the construction of a lighthouse on Scarborough Shoal to bolster the Philippine claim. Parts of the lighthouse had been pre-fabricated on the mainland Philippines but, according to Almonte, the project was halted for internal political reasons and to avoid antagonizing China.

=== China's Hegemony in the Scarborough Shoal ===
China and the Philippines' interactions at Scarborough Shoal have evolved over time through several phases. Each phase has been shaped by diplomatic strategies, domestic politics, and shifts in maritime capabilities. Before the 2012 confrontation, Filipino and Chinese fishermen commonly operated around the shoal with little interference from either government. Both states maintained their territorial claims, but day-to-day activity was informal, and cooperative interactions were not uncommon despite underlying tensions.

This relative calm began to change in the late 2000s as both sides expanded maritime patrols to protect fisheries and enforce resource management in the South China Sea. The Philippines increased monitoring of the area in response to overfishing and the presence of foreign trawlers, emphasizing enforcement of domestic laws within its claimed Exclusive Economic Zone. China strengthened oversight of its perceived fishing grounds, assigning responsibilities across maritime surveillance, fisheries, and law enforcement agencies. These institutionalizations led to more frequent official encounters at sea, setting the stage for later disputes.

After China gained effective access control in 2012, interactions became more structured. Chinese authorities implemented regular patrols near the bay entrance to monitor incoming traffic, which they described as routine administrative functions. The Philippines argued that these measures restricted its law enforcement and environmental activities, documenting instances where research teams and coast guard units were unable to access the shoal, prompting diplomatic protests.

Early diplomatic efforts aimed at managing tensions achieved limited results. Working groups attempted to prevent miscommunication and establish confidence-building measures, such as avoiding accidental collisions and coordinating patrol schedules. However, disagreements over jurisdiction and China's insistence that its presence was lawful made these efforts largely symbolic.

Economic and livelihood concerns also influenced relations. Scarborough Shoal is an important source of income for coastal communities in the Philippines, including Zambales and Pangasinan. After 2012, restricted access caused fluctuations in local catch volumes, forcing Filipino fishermen to travel farther offshore at higher cost and greater risk. China argued its regulations aimed to conserve marine resources, while the Philippines contended they unilaterally infringed upon the rights of its fishermen.

Shifts in Philippine foreign policy shaped the tone of bilateral engagement. Manila alternated between passive diplomacy, covert negotiations, and proposals for resource sharing, alongside transparency measures and coordination with international partners. China maintained that external involvement complicated what it considered a bilateral matter, whereas the Philippines viewed international support as essential to upholding its maritime rights.

=== Scarborough Shoal standoff ===
The 2012 Scarborough Shoal standoff between China and the Philippines led to a situation where access to the atoll was restricted by the People's Republic of China. The expected intervention of the United States to protect its ally through an existing mutual defence treaty did not commence after the United States indirectly stated that it does not recognise any nation's sovereignty over Scarborough Shoal, leading to strained ties between the Philippines and the United States. In January 2013, the Philippines formally initiated arbitration proceedings against China's claim on the territories within the "nine-dash line" that includes Spratly Islands and Scarborough Shoal, which it said is "unlawful" under the United Nations Convention on the Law of the Sea (UNCLOS). An arbitration tribunal was constituted under Annex VII of UNCLOS and it was decided in July 2013 that the Permanent Court of Arbitration (PCA) would function as registry and provide administrative duties in the proceedings.

On 12 July 2016, PCA tribunal arbitrators ruled in favor of the Philippines on most of the state's submissions. They concluded in the decision that there was no evidence that China had historically exercised exclusive control over the waters or resources, hence there was "no legal basis for China to claim historic rights" over the nine-dash line. Accordingly, the PCA tribunal decision is ruled as final and non-appealable by either country. The tribunal also criticised China's land reclamation projects and its construction of artificial islands in the Spratly Islands, saying that it had caused "severe harm to the coral reef environment". It also characterised Taiping Island and other features of the Spratly Islands as "rocks" under UNCLOS, and therefore are not entitled to a 200 nautical mile exclusive economic zone. The People's Republic of China rejected the ruling, calling it "ill-founded". In 2019, the Republic of China (Taiwan) also rejected the ruling.

In late 2016, following the state visit to Beijing of Philippine President Rodrigo Duterte seeking warmer ties with China, the latter gave "fishing rights" to Filipino vessels to access the atoll for fishing. In January 2018, Philippine news outlet Rappler reported the China Coast Guard frequently took the catch of Filipino fisherfolk, paying them "two bottles of mineral water" worth about ₱20 for every ₱3,000 worth of fish. On 14 June 2018, China's destruction of Scarborough Shoal reefs had spread to the extent the damage was visible in satellite images, as confirmed by the University of the Philippines Diliman.

Amid the steady deterioration of China-Philippines relations under Philippine President Bongbong Marcos, on 30 April 2024, a Philippine Coast Guard (PCG) ship and a fisheries vessel, accompanied by invited journalists, attempted to approach the waters of the shoal. China Coast Guard ships responded by firing water cannons at the vessels, which sustained damage. PCG spokesperson Commodore Jay Tarriela later said the water cannon incident was not an "armed attack" that could trigger the US-Philippines Mutual Defense Treaty as there was no "death of a soldier or a member of the Philippine Coast Guard", citing President Marcos' earlier statement.

==== 2025 collision ====
On August 11, 2025, the Philippine Coast Guard (PCG) said on social media that it conducted the Kadiwa Para sa Bagong Bayaning Mangingisda (KBBM, “one in spirit for the new hero fisherfolk”), an initiative supporting the 35 fishermen who were in the Scarborough Shoal with PCG ships BRP Teresa Magbanua, BRP Suluan, along with MV Pamamalakaya. It added that during the exercise, the Type 052D guided missile destroyer Guilin of the People's Liberation Army Navy (PLAN) and China Coast Guard (CCG) cutter 3104 attempted to block BRP Suluan. The PCG ship avoided both Chinese vessels, while CCG 3104 was attempting to fire water cannon in what was described as "hazardous" maneuvers.

China Coast Guard 3104 chasing Philippine Coast Guard BRP Suluan with water cannon then being rammed by PLA Navy 164 in Scarborough Shoal

Multiple recording devices from PCG crew and Filipino journalists on board Suluan showed that the Guilin and CCG 3104 attempted to squeeze Suluan, which tried to avoid both Chinese ships. Suluan was turning to starboard, while CCG 3104 was on its tail a little to port. Guilin went far to starboard to gain momentum and swung back again to port to cut the Suluan. However, Suluan accelerated and turned to port as well. Guilin passed the stern of Suluan, and CCG 3104, with no room to maneuver and avoid Guilin, crashed into the PLAN destroyer. A few seconds prior to the crash, the bow of CCG 3104 had between three and six China Coast Guard personnel, who tried to place some fenders. Images taken from Suluan showed CCG 3104's bow and forecastle had crumpled inwards by about 10 meters. Guilin continued with the chase of Suluan, instead of rendering help and rescue of the stationary CCG 3104.

The BRP Teresa Magbanua radioed CCG 3104 offering to assist in the search and rescue of missing CCG personnel on the bow before the crash, as well as medical assistance. The PLAN and CCG did not respond to the offer, and were later seen conducting their own search pattern for the missing personnel. On the evening of the incident, a Chinese military Weibo account, 海洋裝備與公務船資訊, posted three candles and crying emojis, which netizens have speculated meant three CCG personnel had died. The following day, Philippine Senator Panfilo Lacson said two CCG personnel had died in the incident, which the CCG had yet to confirm.

The Chinese government initially did not comment over the incident. Chinese Ministry of Defense spokesperson Jian Bin later released the statements that Philippine ships "illegally intruded into the territorial waters of China's Huangyan Dao" and that "during the incident, a PCG vessel made dangerous maneuvers such as high-speed changing and sharp turns to cross the bow of Chinese vessels, which created a complex and close quarters situation at sea."

The following day, USS Higgins, an Arleigh Burke-class destroyer with the United States Navy sailed through the area, on a freedom of navigation exercise, though Chinese media reported that the PLAN "drove away" the U.S. ship.

The crew of Suluan returned to Manila on August 12, 2025, and the 43 officers and crew were given awards by the Philippine Coast Guard Commandant Admiral Ronnie Gil Gavan.

=== Subsequent events ===
On 10 September 2025, the State Council of China approved the creation of the Huangyan Island National Nature Reserve in the Scarborough Shoal. The northeast rim of the shoal was declared as part of the reserve which consists of a "core zone" flanked by a "experimental zone".

On 11 April 2026 satellite imagery showed fishing boats anchored across the entrance to the reef and that a 352 m floating barrier had been placed across it.(Ten Chinese coast guard vessels were sighted at the shoal from early to mid-April.)

== Land reclamation and other activities in the surrounding area ==
A March 2016 article by the Center for Strategic and International Studies' Asia Maritime Transparency Initiative said that satellite imagery had shown no signs of any land reclamation, dredging or construction activities in Scarborough shoal and the only vessels present were a Chinese civilian ship anchored within the mouth of the lagoon, which has been typical for several years, and two Filipino trimaran-type fishing ships outside the shoal. However, according to the then U.S. chief of naval operations Admiral John Richardson that did not mean that Chinese ships had not performed surveys in preparation for reclamation.

In September 2016, during the ASEAN summit, the Philippine government produced photos that it said showed fresh PRC construction activity at the atoll. A US administration official questioned the Philippines' claim, saying the United States had not detected any unusual activity at Scarborough Shoal. In the same month, The New York Times reported that PRC activities at the Shoal continued in the form of naval patrols and hydrographic surveys.

In March 2017, the mayor of Sansha City said China was to begin preparatory work for an environmental monitoring station on Scarborough Shoal.

PRC activities in and around the Scarborough Shoal have drawn criticism from US officials. In March 2017, U.S. Senators Marco Rubio and Ben Cardin introduced the South China Sea and East China Sea Sanctions Act which would impose sanctions for Chinese entities and people helping to build South and East China Sea projects.

In June 2019, the Philippine Coast Guard (PCG) spotted a People's Liberation Army Navy warship, alongside two China Coast Guard vessels, and two Chinese maritime militia vessels near the shoal.

In September 2019, Antonio Carpio, a former Chief Justice of the Supreme Court of the Philippines, said that China would try to reclaim the Scarborough Shoal within Philippine President Rodrigo Duterte's term before it signs the Asean-China Code of Conduct because Duterte had said that Beijing could not be stopped from building because it was too powerful.

Academic Jay Batongbacal said that the visiting forces agreement between the Philippines and the United States deterred the transformation of Scarborough Shoal by the PRC into an artificial island, saying, "Scarborough Shoal is the only piece left in the puzzle that they're trying to build. They can now completely exclude other countries from the South China Sea militarily if they're able to put into place all of these military bases."

On 26 September 2023, the Philippine Coast Guard announced that they conducted an operation to remove the floating barrier installed by Chinese Coast Guard officers near the shoal in the southeast. A new floating barrier was deployed in 2024.

== Sovereignty dispute ==
=== Claims by China and Taiwan ===
Location of the major claimed islands in the Sansha administrative area of China.
Legend：
- Black：α – Yongxing Island (Woody Island) (seat of Sansha)
- Red：β – Chigua Reef (Johnson South Reef)
- Green：γ – Dongmen Reef (Hughes Reef)
- Yellow：δ – Huangyan Island (Scarborough Shoal)
- Red：ε – Huayang Reef (Cuarteron Reef)
- Blue：ζ – Meiji Reef (Mischief Reef)
- Blue：η – Nanxun Reef (Gaven Reefs)
- Black：θ – Zhongjian Island (Triton Island)
- Green：κ – Yongshu Reef (Fiery Cross Reef)
- Purple：λ – Zhubi Reef (Subi Reef)

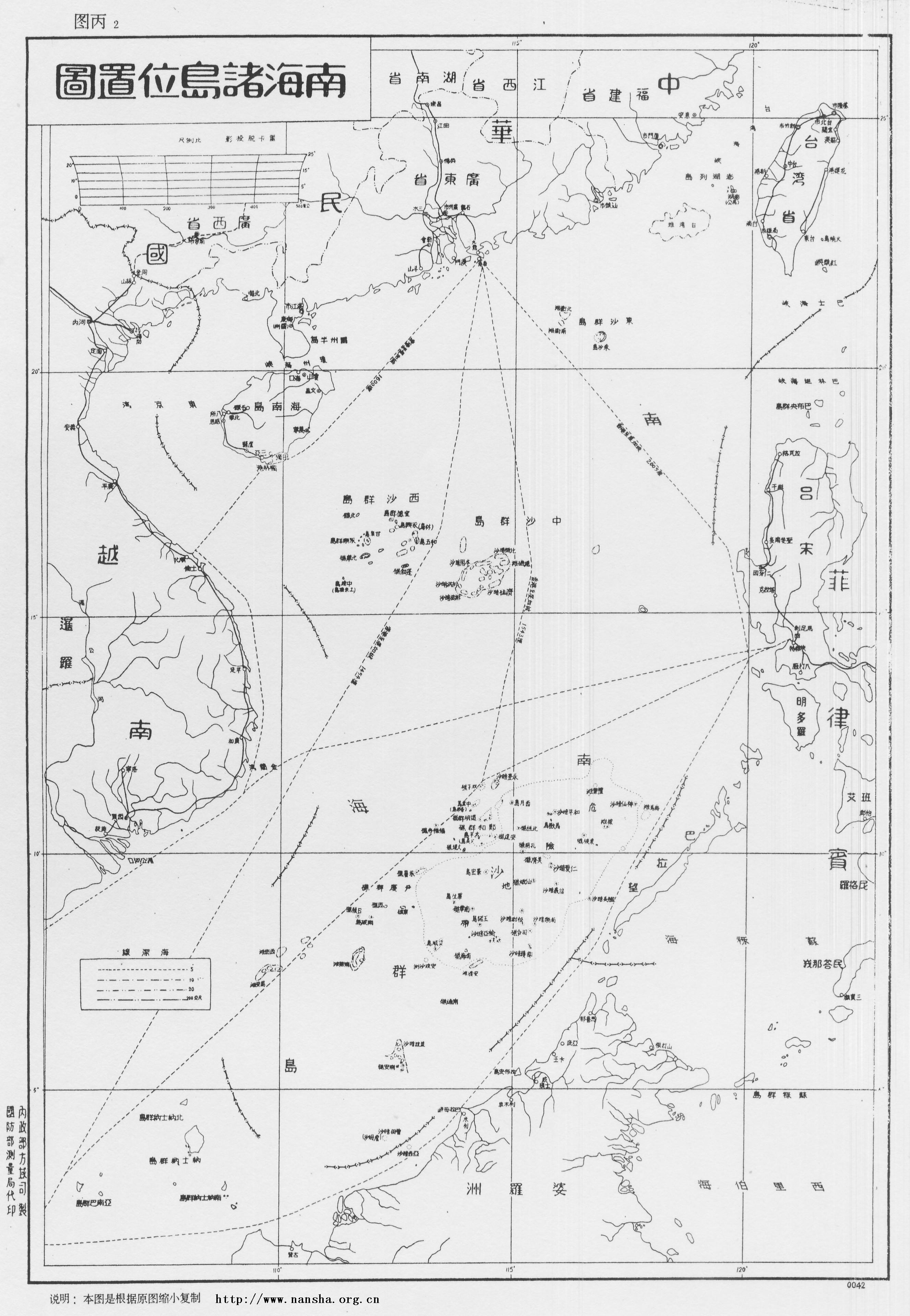
Map depicting the ROC and PRC's territorial claims in South China Sea, with Scarborough Shoal depicted within the nine-dash line of 1947.

The People's Republic of China and Taiwan (Republic of China) claim that Chinese people discovered the atoll centuries ago and that there is a long history of Chinese fishing activity in the area. The atoll lies within the nine-dash line drawn by China on maps marking its claim to islands and relevant waters consistent with UNCLOS within the South China Sea. Chinese astronomer Guo Shoujing went to "Nanhai" (literally, "South Sea") in 1279, under the Yuan dynasty, as part of an empire-wide survey called "Measurement of the Four Seas" (四海測驗). In 1979 historical geographer Han Zhenhua (韩振华) was among the first scholars to claim that the point called "Nanhai" in that astronomical survey referred to Scarborough Shoal. In 1980 during a conflict with Vietnam for sovereignty over the Paracel Islands (Xisha Islands), however, the Chinese government issued an official document claiming that "Nanhai" in the 1279 survey was located in the Paracels. Historical geographer Niu Zhongxun defended this view in several articles. In 1990, a historian called Zeng Zhaoxuan (曾昭璇) argued instead that the Nanhai measuring point was located in Central Vietnam. Historian of astronomy Chen Meidong (陈美东) and historian of Chinese science Nathan Sivin have since agreed with Zeng's position in their respective books about Guo Shoujing. An article published in May 2012 in the People's Liberation Army Daily states that "Nanhai" was Scarborough Shoal. a 2019 article in the publication Maritime Issues suggested that a common fishing ground for China, Vietnam and the Philippines as the best option to avoid deterioration of the conflict.

In 1935, China, as the Republic of China (ROC), regarded the atoll as part of the Zhongsha Islands. That position has since been maintained by both the ROC, which now governs Taiwan, and the People's Republic of China (PRC). In 1947, the atoll was given the name Minzhu Jiao (Chinese: 民主礁; lit. 'Democracy Reef'). In 1983, the People's Republic of China renamed it Huangyan Island with Minzhu Jiao reserved as a second name. In 1956, Beijing protested Philippine remarks that the South China Sea islands in close proximity to Philippine territory should belong to the Philippines. China's Declaration on the territorial Sea, promulgated in 1958, says in part,

The breadth of the Territorial Sea of the People's Republic of China shall be twelve nautical miles. This applies to all territories of the People's Republic of China, including the Chinese mainland and its coastal islands, as well as Taiwan and its surrounding islands, the Penghu Islands, the Dongsha Islands, the Xisha Islands, the Zhongsha Islands, the Nansha Islands and all other islands belonging to China which are separated from the mainland and its coastal islands by the high seas.

China reaffirmed its claim of sovereignty over the Zhongsha Islands in its 1992 Law on the territorial Sea and the Contiguous Zone. China claims all the islands, reefs, and shoals within a U-shaped line in the South China Sea drawn in 1947 as its territory. Scarborough Shoal lies within this area.

China further asserted its claim shortly after the departure of the US Navy force from Subic, Zambales, Philippines. In the late 1970s, many scientific expedition activities organised by State Bureau of Surveying, National Earthquake Bureau and National Bureau of Oceanography were held in the atoll and around this area. In 1980, a stone marker reading "South China Sea Scientific Expedition" was installed on the South Rock, but was removed by the Philippines in 1997.

On 12 July 2016, the Philippines won a landmark international case after a tribunal under the United Nations Convention on the Law of the Sea (UNCLOS) ruled that China's sweeping claims in the South China Sea had no legal basis. China did not accept the ruling and has continued to operate in the disputed waters, including near Scarborough Shoal. According to Filipino judge Antonio Carpio, during the proceedings of the 2016 South China Sea Arbitration, China sent a position paper wherein it reiterated its recognition of the 1898 Treaty of Paris, the 1900 Treaty of Washington, and the 1930 US-UK Treaty. According to the Philippines, they define the country's territory with Scarborough Shoal and the Spratly Islands specifically included. The Chinese government position paper surprised the Filipino delegation, prompting Carpio to say that China likely did not read the full texts of the treaties they used in court. (Note: China added in its position paper that "the territory of the Philippines was confined to the Philippine Islands, having nothing to do with any of China's maritime features in the South China Sea")

On 10 November 2024, China clarified its detailed basis, in terms of baseline, for a territorial water's claim, on the Scarborough Shoal.

On April 22, 2026, China released a promotional video hinting at the development of a fourth aircraft carrier, potentially its first nuclear-powered vessel, while reaffirming its commitment to expand and militarize over 11,000 islands it claims in regional waters. The video, released ahead of the 77th anniversary of the People's Liberation Army Navy, included symbolic references to Taiwan and underscored China's ongoing efforts to project maritime power, secure resources, and reinforce territorial claims amid regional tensions and multinational military exercises.

On 23 July 2026, U.S. Secretary of State Marco Rubio condemned China's actions in the South China Sea after the Chinese Coast Guard was accused of firing water cannons at a Philippine fisheries vessel near Scarborough Shoal and confronting Philippine personnel near Second Thomas Shoal.

On 8 August 2026, the United States criticized China over its actions at Scarborough Shoal. The US said China's plan to make the area a "national nature reserve" could prevent Filipino fishermen from using their traditional fishing grounds and further increase China's control over the area.

=== Claim by the Philippines ===
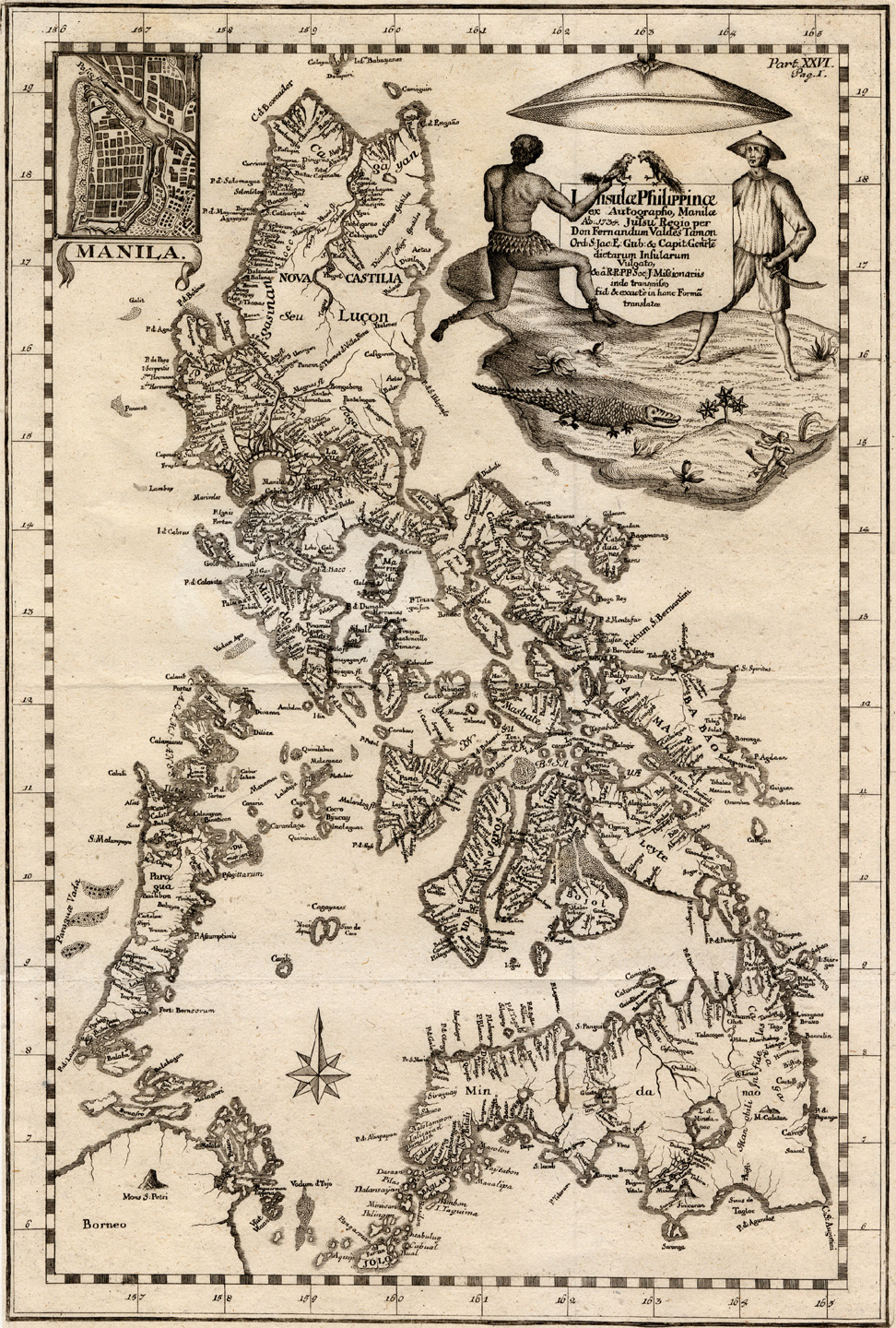
A 1774 reproduction of the 1734 map of the Philippine Islands showing Galit, Panacot, and Lumbay. In contrast, China and Taiwan's claims are backed by a map with eleven dashed lines dated 1947.

The Philippines state that its assertion of sovereignty over the atoll is based on the juridical criteria established by public international law on the lawful methods for the acquisition of sovereignty. Among the criteria (effective occupation, cession, prescription, conquest, and accretion), the Philippine Department of Foreign Affairs (DFA) has asserted that the country exercised both effective occupation and effective jurisdiction over the atoll, which it terms Bajo de Masinloc, since its independence. Thus, it claims to have erected flags in some islands and a lighthouse which it reported to the International Maritime Organization. It also asserts that the Philippine and US Naval Forces have used it as impact range and that its Department of Environment and Natural Resources has conducted scientific, topographic and marine studies in the atoll, while Filipino fishermen regularly use it as fishing ground and have always considered it their own.

The DFA also claims that the name Bajo de Masinloc (translated as "Masinloc shoal") itself identifies the atoll as a particular political subdivision of the Philippine Province of Zambales, known as Masinloc.

It also asserts that there is no indication that the international community has acquiesced to China's historical claim, and that the activity of fishing of private Chinese individuals, claimed to be a traditional exercise among these waters, does not constitute a sovereign act of the Chinese state.

The Philippine government argues that since the legal basis of its claim is based on the international law on acquisition of sovereignty, the exclusive economic zone claim on the waters around Scarborough is different from the sovereignty exercised by the Philippines in the atoll.

The Philippine government has proposed taking the dispute to the International Tribunal for the Law of the Sea (ITLOS) as provided in Part XV of the United Nations Convention on the Law of the Sea, but the Chinese government has rejected this, insisting on bilateral discussions.

The Philippines also claims that as early as the Spanish colonisation of the Philippines, Filipino fishermen were already using the area as a traditional fishing ground and shelter during bad weather.

Several official Philippine maps published by Spain and United States in 18th and 20th centuries show Scarborough Shoal as Philippine territory. The 18th-century map Carta hydrographica y chorographica de las Islas Filipinas (1734) shows 3 atolls Galit, Panacot and Lumbay. The map also shows the shape of Lumbay as consistent with the current maps available as today. In 1792, another map drawn by the Malaspina expedition and published in 1808 in Madrid, Spain also showed Bajo de Masinloc as part of Philippine territory. The map showed the route of the Malaspina expedition to and around the atoll. It was reproduced in the Atlas of the 1939 Philippine Census, which was published in Manila a year later and predates the controversial 1947 Chinese South China Sea Claim Map that shows no Chinese name on it. Another topographic map drawn in 1820 shows the atoll, named there as Bajo Scarburo, as a constituent part of Sambalez (Zambales province). During the 1900s, Mapa General, Islas Filipinas, Observatorio de Manila, and US Coast and Geodetic Survey Map include the Scarborough Shoal named as Baju De Masinloc. A map published in 1978 by the Philippine National Mapping and Resource Information Authority, however, did not indicate Scarborough Shoal as part of the Philippines. Scholar Li Xiao Cong stated in his published paper that Panacot Shoal is not Scarborough Shoal, in the 1778 map A chart of the China Sea and Philippine Islands with the Archipelagos of Felicia and Soloo, Scarborough shoal and 3 other shoals Galit, Panacot and Lumbay were all shown independently. Li also pointed out that the three shoals were also shown on Chinese maps which were published in 1717.

In 1957, the Philippine government conducted an oceanographic survey of the area and together with the US Navy force based in then U.S. Naval Base Subic Bay in Zambales, used the area as an impact range for defence purposes. An 8.3-meter high flag pole flying a Philippine flag was raised in 1965. An iron tower that was to serve as a small lighthouse was also built and operated the same year. In 1992, the Philippine Navy rehabilitated the lighthouse and reported it to the International Maritime Organization for publication in the List of Lights. As of 2009, the military-maintained lighthouse is non-operational.

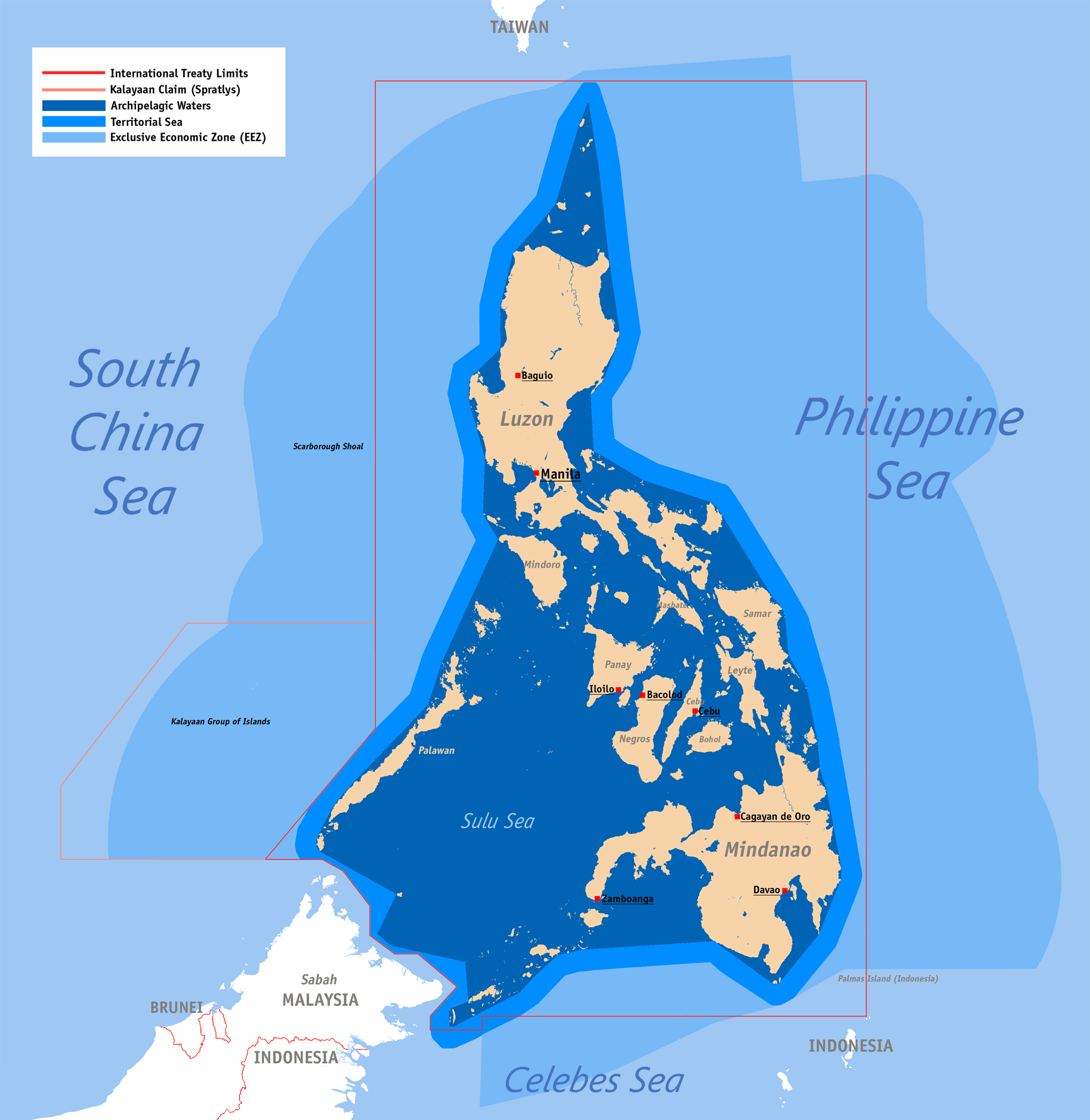
Map showing territory claimed by the Philippines, including internal waters, territorial sea, international treaty limits and exclusive economic zone.

Historically, the Philippine boundary has been defined by its three treaties, Treaty of Paris (1898), Treaty of Washington (1900) and "Convention regarding the boundary between the Philippine Archipelago and the State of North Borneo". Many analysts consider that the 1900 Treaty of Washington concerned only the islands of Sibutu and Cagayan de Sulu, but a point of view argued that Scarborough Shoal has been transferred to the United States based on the Treaty of Washington (1900), ignoring the fact that the cession documents from the United States to the Philippines did not have any reference to the Scarborough Shoal.

Presidential Decree No. 1596, issued by President Ferdinand Marcos on 11 June 1978, asserted that islands designated as the Kalayaan Island Group and comprising most of the Spratly Islands are subject to the sovereignty of the Philippines, and by virtue of the Presidential Decree No. 1599 issued on 11 June 1978 claimed an Exclusive Economic Zone up to 200 nautical miles (370 km) from the baselines from which their territorial sea is measured.

The Philippines' bilateral dispute with China over the atoll began at the start of 1997 with Filipino naval ships preventing Chinese boats from approaching the atoll including at one point turning away a boat carrying ham radio operators and again. On 5 June of that year, Domingo Siazon Jr., who was then the Philippine Secretary of Foreign Affairs, testified in front of the Committee on Foreign Relations of the United States Senate that the Shoal was "a new issue on overlapping claims between the Philippines and China".

In 2009, the Philippine Baselines Law of 2009 (RA 9522), principally authored by Antonio Trillanes and sponsored by Senator Miriam Defensor Santiago, was enacted into law by President Gloria Macapagal-Arroyo. The new law classified the Kalayaan Island Group and the Scarborough Shoal as a regime of islands under the Republic of the Philippines.

In 2012, the Department of Foreign Affairs asserts that Philippine sovereignty and jurisdiction over the Scarborough Shoal are not premised on the cession by Spain of the Philippine archipelago to the United States under the Treaty of Paris and whether the shoal is included within the limits of the 1898 treaty is immaterial and of no consequence.

In 2015, the Philippines offered to downgrade its claim over parts of the Malaysian state of Sabah if Malaysia adopted a different position on maritime claims that could help strengthen the Philippines' case in its arbitration against China. Malaysia considered this to be against its maritime interest and a risk to its ties with China.

=== Related arbitration under UNCLOS ===
The South China Sea Arbitration (Philippines v. China, PCA case number 2013–19) was an arbitration case brought by the Republic of the Philippines against the People's Republic of China (PRC) under Annex VII (subject to Part XV) of the United Nations Convention on the Law of the Sea (UNCLOS, ratified by the Philippines in 1984, by the PRC in 1996, opted out from Section 2 of Part XV by China in 2006) concerning certain issues in the South China Sea, including the nine-dash line introduced by the mainland-based Republic of China since as early as 1947. A tribunal of arbitrators appointed the Permanent Court of Arbitration (PCA) as the registry for the proceedings.

On 19 February 2013, China declared that it would not participate in the arbitration. On 7 December 2014, it published a white paper to elaborate its position that, among other points, the tribunal lacks jurisdiction. In accordance with Article 3 of Annex VII of UNCLOS, the Philippines appointed 1 of the 5 arbitrators, while China did not appoint any. On 29 October 2015, the tribunal concluded that it had jurisdiction to consider seven of the Philippines' submissions, subject to certain conditions, and postponed the consideration of its jurisdiction on the other eight submissions to the merits phase.

On 12 July 2016, the arbitral tribunal ruled in favor of the Philippines on most of its submissions. It clarified that while it would not "rule on any question of sovereignty ... and would not delimit any maritime boundary", China's historic rights claims over maritime areas (as opposed to land masses and territorial waters) within the "nine-dash line" have no lawful effect unless entitled to under UNCLOS. China has rejected the ruling, as has Taiwan. As of November 2023, 26 governments support the ruling, 17 issued generally positive statements noting the ruling but not called for compliance, and eight rejected it. The United Nations does not hold any position on the case or on the disputed claims.

== See also ==
- Scarborough Shoal standoff
- China–Philippines relations
- List of territorial disputes
- South China Sea Islands
- West Philippine Sea

=== Other East Asian island disputes ===
- Kuril Islands dispute
- Liancourt Rocks dispute
- Okinotorishima, another smaller shoal with three skerries
- Paracel Islands
- Pratas Island and the Vereker Banks
- Senkaku Islands dispute
- Spratly Islands dispute
